= List of Columbus Crew records and statistics =

The Columbus Crew are an American professional soccer team based in Columbus, Ohio, that competes in Major League Soccer (MLS).

This is a list of club records for Columbus, which dates from their inaugural season in 1996 to present.

== Honors ==
National
Competition	Titles	Wins	Runners-up
MLS Cup	3	2008, 2020, 2023	2015
Supporters' Shield	3	2004, 2008, 2009	2024
U.S. Open Cup	1	2002	1998, 2010, 2026
Continental
Competition	Titles	Wins	Runners-up
Campeones Cup	1	2021	2024
Leagues Cup	1	2024	

Individual Club Awards

- MLS Fair Play Award (6): 1997, 1999, 2004, 2007, 2016, 2021
- CONCACAF Champions Cup Fair Play Award: 2024

== Player records ==
=== Appearances ===
As of October 31, 2026

Rank	Player	Years	Signed from	MLS	Playoffs	Open Cup	Continental	Total
1	(United States) Chad Marshall	2004–2013	Stanford Cardinal	253	11	8	5	277
2	(United States) Mike Clark	1996–2003	Richmond Kickers	221	22	18	4	265
3	(United States) Jeff Cunningham	1998–2004; 2011	South Florida Bulls; FC Dallas	203	17	17	6	243
4	(United States) Eddie Gaven	2006–2013	MetroStars	209	9	10	13	241
5	(Iraq) Justin Meram	2011–2017; 2018–2019	Michigan Wolverines; Orlando City	206	15	11	2	234
6	(United States) Darlington Nagbe	2020–2025	Atlanta United	175	15	1	25	216
7	(Argentina) Federico Higuaín	2012–2019	Colón	193	14	3	0	210
8	(United States) Brian Maisonneuve	1996–2004	Indiana Hoosiers	172	17	13	6	208
9	(United States) Josh Williams	2010–2014; 2017–2023	Cleveland Internationals; Toronto FC	183	12	4	7	206
10	(United States) Wil Trapp	2013–2019	Akron Zips	185	15	5	0	205

Bold denotes players still playing for the club.

=== Goals ===
As of October 31, 2026

Rank	Player	Years	Signed from	MLS	Playoffs†	Open Cup	Continental	Total
1	(United States) Brian McBride	1996–2003	VfL Wolfsburg	62	9	8	0	79
2	(United States) Jeff Cunningham	1998–2004; 2011	South Florida Bulls; FC Dallas	64	3	6	1	74
3	(United States) Gyasi Zardes	2018–2022	LA Galaxy	54	4	1	2	61
4	(Argentina) Federico Higuaín	2012–2019	Colón	55	4	0	0	59
5	(Colombia) Cucho Hernández	2022–2025	Watford	44	5	0	9	58
6	(Trinidad and Tobago) Stern John	1998–1999	New Orleans Riverboat Gamblers	44	8	3	0	55
7	(United States) Edson Buddle	2001–2005	Long Island Rough Riders	42	2	4	4	52
8	(Uruguay) Diego Rossi	2023–2026	Fenerbahçe	37	2	0	12	51
9	(Iraq) Justin Meram	2011–2017; 2018–2019	Michigan Wolverines; Orlando City	38	3	2	0	43
10	(Armenia) Lucas Zelarayán	2020–2023	UANL	38	2	0	2	42

Bold denotes players still playing for the club.

† Includes MLS is Back Tournament knockout round.

=== Assists ===
As of October 31, 2026

Rank	Player	Years	Signed from	MLS	Playoffs	Open Cup	Continental	Total
1	(Poland) Robert Warzycha	1996–2002	Honvéd	61	5	4	1	71
2	(Argentina) Federico Higuaín	2012–2019	Colón	63	5	1	0	69
3	(United States) Jeff Cunningham	1998–2004; 2011	South Florida Bulls; FC Dallas	44	5	7	0	56
4	(United States) Brian McBride	1996–2003	VfL Wolfsburg	45	3	1	2	51
5	(Argentina) Guillermo Barros Schelotto	2007–2010	Boca Juniors	41	7	0	0	48
6	(United States) Brian Maisonneuve	1996–2004	Indiana Hoosiers	37	3	1	0	41
7	(Colombia) Cucho Hernández	2022-2025	Watford	28	3	0	7	38
8	(Armenia) Lucas Zelarayán	2020–2023	UANL	30	5	0	2	37
9	(Iraq) Justin Meram	2011–2017; 2018–2019	Michigan Wolverines; Orlando City	33	2	1	0	36
10	(Portugal) Pedro Santos	2017–2022	Braga	34	0	1	0	35
10	(United States) Brian West	1998–2003	Virginia Cavaliers	29	2	4	0	35

Bold denotes players still playing for the club.

=== Shutouts ===
As of October 31, 2026

Rank	Player	Years	Signed from	MLS	Playoffs	Open Cup	Continental	Total
1	(United States) William Hesmer	2007–2012	Kansas City Wizards	41	1	0	3	45
2	(United States) **Patrick Schulte**	2022–present	Saint Louis Billikens	28	3	0	2	33
3	(United States) Jon Busch	2002–2006	Hershey Wildcats	25	1	2	1	29
4	(Curaçao) Eloy Room	2019–2023	PSV Eindhoven	25	1	0	2	28
5	(United States) Zack Steffen	2016–2019	SC Freiburg	23	3	0	0	26
6	(United States) Steve Clark	2014–2016	Hønefoss BK	22	1	0	0	23
6	(United States) Andy Gruenebaum	2006–2013	Kentucky Wildcats	18	0	2	3	23
8	(United States) Mark Dougherty	1998–2001	Tampa Bay Mutiny	10	2	2	0	14
9	(United States) Brad Friedel	1996–1997	Galatasaray	11	1	0	0	12
10	(United States) Tom Presthus	2000–2003	D.C. United	9	0	0	1	10

Bold denotes players still playing for the club.

== Coaching records ==
Coach	Nationality	Tenure
Timo Liekoski	Finland	December 5, 1995 – August 2, 1996
Tom Fitzgerald	United States	August 2, 1996 – May 17, 2001
Greg Andrulis	United States	May 17, 2001 – July 16, 2005
Robert Warzycha (interim)	Poland	July 16, 2005 – October 20, 2005
Sigi Schmid	Germany	October 20, 2005 – December 16, 2008
Robert Warzycha	Poland	December 23, 2008 – September 2, 2013
Brian Bliss (interim)	United States	September 2, 2013 – November 6, 2013
Gregg Berhalter	United States	November 6, 2013 – December 2, 2018
Caleb Porter	United States	January 4, 2019 – October 10, 2022
Wilfried Nancy	France	December 6, 2022 – December 3, 2025
Henrik Rydström	Sweden	December 31, 2025 – present

=== Trophies ===
Rank	Coach	MLS	SS	USOC	LC	CC	Total
1	(United States) Greg Andrulis	–	1	1	–	–	2
1	(France) Wilfried Nancy	1	–	–	1	–	2
1	(United States) Caleb Porter	1	–	–	–	1	2
1	(Germany) Sigi Schmid	1	1	–	–	–	2
5	(Poland) Robert Warzycha	–	1	–	–	–	1

== International results ==
=== By competition ===
As of March 11, 2024

Competition	Pld	W	D	L	GF	GA	GD	W%
CONCACAF Champions Cup	33	14	8	11	44	47	–3	42.42
CONCACAF Giants Cup	2	0	1	1	1	3	−2	00.00
Campeones Cup	2	1	1	0	3	1	2	50.00
Leagues Cup	8	6	2	0	23	10	13	75.00
Total	45	21	12	12	71	61	+20	46.67

=== By club ===
As of March 17, 2026 (Includes: CONCACAF Giants Cup, CONCACAF Champions Cup, Campeones Cup, and Leagues Cup)

Club	Pld	W	D	L	GF	GA	GD
(Panama) Árabe Unido	2	0	1	1	1	3	–1
(Mexico) América	2	1	1	0	5	2	+3
(Mexico) Cruz Azul	3	1	0	2	2	7	–5
(United States) Houston Dynamo FC	2	1	1	0	2	1	+1
(United States) Inter Miami CF	1	1	0	0	3	2	+1
(Trinidad and Tobago) Joe Public	2	2	0	0	7	1	+6
(Mexico) León	1	1	0	0	1	0	+1
(United States) Los Angeles FC	5	3	0	2	7	9	–2
(United States) Minnesota United FC	1	0	1	0	3	3	0
(Mexico) Monterrey	4	2	1	1	7	7	0
(Mexico) Morelia	2	1	0	1	2	6	–4
(Guatemala) Municipal	2	1	0	1	2	2	0
(United States) New York City FC	1	0	1	0	1	1	0
(Mexico) Pachuca	1	0	0	1	0	3	–3
(United States) Philadelphia Union	1	1	0	0	3	1	+2
(Mexico) Puebla	1	1	0	0	3	1	+2
Puerto Rico Islanders	2	1	1	0	3	1	+2
(United States) Real Salt Lake	2	0	1	1	1	4	–3
(Nicaragua) Real Estelí	2	2	0	0	5	0	+5
(Mexico) Santos Laguna	2	1	0	1	1	1	0
(Costa Rica) Saprissa	4	2	1	1	6	3	+3
(United States) Sporting Kansas City	1	1	0	0	4	0	+4
(United States) St. Louis City SC	1	1	0	0	2	1	+1
(Mexico) Toluca	3	0	2	1	6	7	–1
(Mexico) UANL	2	0	2	0	2	2	0

=== By nation ===
As of March 11, 2024 (Includes: CONCACAF Giants Cup, CONCACAF Champions Cup, Campeones Cup, and Leagues Cup)

Nation	Pld	W	D	L	GF	GA	GD
Costa Rica	4	1	2	1	3	4	–1
Panama	2	1	1	0	4	2	+2
Mexico	21	8	6	7	29	36	–7
Puerto Rico	2	1	1	0	3	1	+2
Guatemala	2	1	0	1	2	2	0
Nicaragua	2	2	0	0	5	0	+5
Trinidad and Tobago	2	2	0	0	7	1	+6
United States	14	8	4	3	26	22	+4

=== By season ===
Columbus Crew in international tournaments
Season	Competition	Round	Opponent	Home	Away	Aggregate
2001	CONCACAF Giants Cup	Quarterfinals	(Costa Rica) Saprissa	1–1	0–2	1–3
2003	CONCACAF Champions' Cup	First round	(Panama) Árabe Unido	3–0	1–2	4–2
2003	CONCACAF Champions' Cup	Quarterfinals	(Mexico) Morelia	2–0	0–6	2–6
2009–10	CONCACAF Champions League	Group C	Puerto Rico Islanders	2–0	1–1	2nd
2009–10	CONCACAF Champions League	Group C	(Mexico) Cruz Azul	0–2	0–5	2nd
2009–10	CONCACAF Champions League	Group C	(Costa Rica) Saprissa	1–1	1–0	2nd
2009–10	CONCACAF Champions League	Quarterfinals	(Mexico) Toluca	2–2	2–3	4–5
2010–11	CONCACAF Champions League	Group B	(Guatemala) Municipal	1–0	1–2	2nd
2010–11	CONCACAF Champions League	Group B	(Mexico) Santos Laguna	1–0	0–1	2nd
2010–11	CONCACAF Champions League	Group B	(Trinidad and Tobago) Joe Public	3–0	4–1	2nd
2010–11	CONCACAF Champions League	Quarterfinals	(United States) Real Salt Lake	0–0	1–4	1–4
2021	CONCACAF Champions League	Round of 16	(Nicaragua) Real Estelí	1–0	4–0	5–0
2021	CONCACAF Champions League	Quarterfinals	(Mexico) Monterrey	2–2	0–3	2–5
2021	Campeones Cup	Final	(Mexico) Cruz Azul	2–0	—N/a	2–0
2023	Leagues Cup	Central 1	(United States) St. Louis City SC	2–1	—N/a	1st
2023	Leagues Cup	Central 1	(Mexico) América	4–1	—N/a	1st
2023	Leagues Cup	Round of 32	(United States) Minnesota United FC	3–3	—N/a	3–3 (3–4 p)
2024	CONCACAF Champions Cup	Round of 16	(United States) Houston Dynamo FC	1–1	1–0	2–1
2024	CONCACAF Champions Cup	Quarterfinals	(Mexico) UANL	1–1	1–1	2–2 (4–3 p)
2024	CONCACAF Champions Cup	Semifinals	(Mexico) Monterrey	2–1	3–1	5–2
2024	CONCACAF Champions Cup	Final	(Mexico) Pachuca	—N/a	0–3	0–3
2024	Leagues Cup	Round of 32	(United States) Sporting Kansas City	4–0	—N/a	4–0
2024	Leagues Cup	Round of 16	(United States) Inter Miami CF	3–2	—N/a	3–2
2024	Leagues Cup	Quarterfinal	(United States) New York City FC	1–1	—N/a	1–1 (4–3 p)
2024	Leagues Cup	Semifinal	(United States) Philadelphia Union	3–1	—N/a	3–1
2024	Leagues Cup	Final	(United States) Los Angeles FC	3–1	—N/a	3–1
2024	Campeones Cup	Final	(Mexico) América	1–1	—N/a	1–1 (4–5 p)
2025	CONCACAF Champions Cup	Round of 16	(United States) Los Angeles FC	2–1	0–3	2–4
2025	Leagues Cup	League stage	(Mexico) Toluca	2–2 (2–4 p)	—N/a	6th
2025	Leagues Cup	League stage	(Mexico) Puebla	3–1	—N/a	6th
2025	Leagues Cup	League stage	(Mexico) León	1–0	—N/a	6th
