= 2002 Columbus Crew season =

Columbus Crew
2002 season
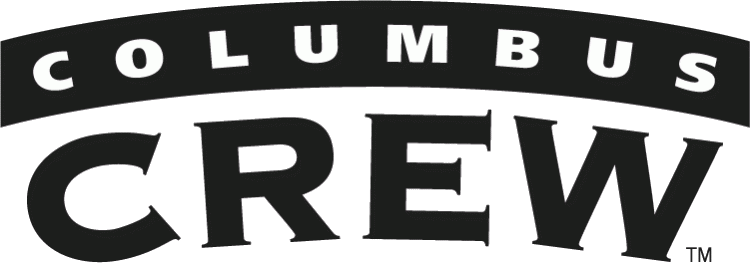
- Investor-operators: Lamar Hunt; Clark Hunt; Dan Hunt; Lamar Hunt Jr. Sharron Hunt Munson; Ron Pizzuti and a group of local investors
- Head Coach: Greg Andrulis
- Stadium: Columbus Crew Stadium
- Major League Soccer: Conference: 2nd Overall: 6th
- MLS Cup playoffs: Semifinals
- U.S. Open Cup: Winners
- Top goalscorer: League: Jeff Cunningham (16); All: Jeff Cunningham (16)
- Highest home attendance: 24,422 (8/31 v. NE)
- Lowest home attendance: 2,103 (9/10 v. KC)
- Average home league attendance: 16,703 (74.1%)
- Biggest win: KC 0–4 CLB (6/2)
- Biggest defeat: NE 4-1 CLB (7/4)
Home colors	Away colors

The 2002 Columbus Crew season was the club's seventh season of existence and their seventh consecutive season in Major League Soccer, the top flight of soccer in the United States. The first match of the season was on March 23 against Chicago Fire. It was the second season under head coach Greg Andrulis. The Crew's USL A-League affiliates this season were Cincinnati Riverhawks, Indiana Blast, Pittsburgh Riverhounds, Rochester Raging Rhinos, Western Massachusetts Pioneers, and Reading Rage.

The Crew would win their first trophy as a club, the 2002 U.S. Open Cup, during this season. In the MLS playoffs, they would fall to the New England Revolution, the eventual MLS Cup runner-up.

== Roster ==
As of August 15, 2002

Note: Flags indicate national team as defined under FIFA eligibility rules; some limited exceptions apply. Players may hold more than one non-FIFA nationality.

No.	Pos.	Nation	Player
1	GK	USA	Jon Busch
3	DF	USA	Mike Clark
4	DF	CRC	Daniel Torres
5	DF	USA	Chad McCarty
7	MF	USA	John Harkes
8	DF	NZL	Duncan Oughton
9	FW	USA	Dante Washington
10	MF	USA	Brian Maisonneuve (captain)
11	FW	USA	Jeff Cunningham
12	FW	USA	Edson Buddle
13	DF	USA	Brian Dunseth

No.	Pos.	Nation	Player
14	MF	COL	John Wilmar Pérez
15	MF	GUA	Freddy Garcia
16	DF	USA	Eric Denton
17	FW	USA	Brian West
19	MF	POL	Robert Warzycha
20	FW	USA	Brian McBride (captain)
21	MF	USA	Kyle Martino
22	GK	USA	Tom Presthus (captain)
23	DF	USA	Chris Leitch
24	MF	USA	Jeff Matteo

== Technical Staff ==
Position	Staff
President/General Manager	(United States) Jim Smith
Head Coach	(United States) Greg Andrulis
Assistant Coach	(Argentina) Oscar Pisano
Assistant Coach	(Poland) Robert Warzycha
Head Trainer	(United States) Craig Devine
Team Manager	(United States) Tucker Walther

== Non-competitive ==
=== Preseason ===
The Crew brought in Antonio Otero, Jason Moore and Chris Houser into camp as non-rostered invitees while they were in Florida.

January 25 Friendly	Cincinnati Riverhawks	1-2	Columbus Crew	Mason, OH
7:00 PM EST	Lowey	Report	Goal	Stadium: Wall2Wall Soccer Facility; Attendance: 300

February 11 Friendly	Columbus Crew	3-1	U.S. Amateur National Team	Bradenton, FL
	Cunningham 8'; Washington, 67'	Report	Goal	Stadium: IMG Academy

February 13 Friendly	Columbus Crew	1-1	Kansas City Wizards	Bradenton, FL
	Cunningham	Report	Goal	Stadium: IMG Academy

February 15 Friendly	UCF Golden Knights	0-2	Columbus Crew	Orlando, FL
		Report	West,	Stadium: UCF Soccer and Track Complex

February 18 Friendly	Columbus Crew	2-2	NY/NJ MetroStars	Bradenton, FL
	Cunningham 60', 70' (pen.)	Report	Mathis 38'; Alvarez 90'	Stadium: IMG Academy; Referee: Gus St. Silva; Assistant referees: Kermit Quisenberry; Steve Davidson

February 18 Friendly	Columbus Crew	2-0	NY/NJ MetroStars	Bradenton, FL
	Buddle; Nusum	Report		Stadium: IMG Academy

February 20 Friendly	Columbus Crew	4-0	U.S. U-17 National Team	Tampa, FL
6:00 PM EST	Cunningham; West; Warzycha; Maisonneuve	Report		Stadium: Pepin-Rood Stadium

February 23 Friendly	Columbus Crew	1-1	San Jose Earthquakes	Bradenton, FL
	De Rosario 25'	Report	Washington	Stadium: IMG Academy

Friendly	Atlas F.C.	v	Columbus Crew	Mexico
		Report

Friendly	Tecos F.C.	v	Columbus Crew	Mexico
		Report

March 13 Friendly	C.D. Guadalajara	1-3	Columbus Crew	Mexico
		Report

March 19 Keith Evans Memorial Match	Columbus Crew	v	Dayton Flyers	Obetz, OH
		Report		Stadium: Crew Training Center

=== Midseason ===
April 30 Connor Senn Memorial Game	Ohio State Buckeyes	0-3	Columbus Crew	Columbus, OH
	Buddle 10'; Pérez 54'; Yeagley 70'	Report		Stadium: Jesse Owens Memorial Stadium; Attendance: 3,000

May 15 Friendly	Columbus Crew	7-2	1. FC Nürnberg	Columbus, OH
7:30 PM EDT	Cunningham 1', 34', 38'; Oughton (yellow card) 16'; Pérez 23'; Buddle 33', 45'; Washington 75'	Report	Cacau 13', (yellow card) 51'; Gomis 60'	Stadium: Columbus Crew Stadium; Attendance: 8,259; Referee: Alex Prus; Assistant referees: Hilario Grajeda; Mikael Linquist; Fourth official: Rizal Milliken

June 25 Friendly	Columbus Crew	1-2	Tigres UANL	Columbus, OH
	Buddle 44'	Report	Irênio 5'; Enílton 25'	Stadium: Columbus Crew Stadium

August 25 Friendly	Cincinnati Riverhawks	0-2	Columbus Crew	Wilder, KY
	Wolf (yellow card) 69'	Report	Denton (yellow card) 27'; García 59'; Washington 80'	Stadium: Town and Country Sports Complex

== Competitive ==
=== Overview ===
Competition	First match	Last match	Starting round	Final position	Record							
Competition	First match	Last match	Starting round	Final position	Pld	W	D	L	GF	GA	GD	Win %
Major League Soccer	March 23, 2002	September 22, 2002	Matchday 1	6th	28	11	5	12	44	43	+1	39.29
MLS Cup Playoffs	September 25, 2002	October 12, 2002	Quarterfinals	Semifinals	5	2	2	1	6	5	+1	40.00
U.S. Open Cup	July 17, 2002	October 24, 2002	Third Round	Winners	4	4	0	0	9	3	+6	100.00
Total					37	17	7	13	59	51	+8	45.95

Source: Competitions

=== MLS ===
==== Standings ====
===== Eastern Conference =====
Pos	Team	Pld	W	L	T	GF	GA	GD	Pts	Qualification
1	New England Revolution	28	12	14	2	49	49	0	38	MLS Cup Playoffs
2	Columbus Crew	28	11	12	5	44	43	+1	38	MLS Cup Playoffs
3	Chicago Fire	28	11	13	4	43	38	+5	37	MLS Cup Playoffs
4	MetroStars	28	11	15	2	41	47	−6	35	
5	D.C. United	28	9	14	5	31	40	−9	32	

Source: MLS

===== Overall table =====
Pos	Team	Pld	W	L	T	GF	GA	GD	Pts	Qualification
4	Colorado Rapids	28	13	11	4	43	48	−5	43	
5	New England Revolution	28	12	14	2	49	49	0	38	CONCACAF Champions' Cup
6	Columbus Crew	28	11	12	5	44	43	+1	38	CONCACAF Champions' Cup
7	Chicago Fire	28	11	13	4	43	38	+5	37	
8	Kansas City Wizards	28	9	10	9	37	45	−8	36	

Source: MLS
Rules for classification: 1) points; 2) head-to-head record; 3) goal difference; 4) number of goals scored

==== Results summary ====
Overall								Home						Away					
Pld	Pts	W	L	T	GF	GA	GD	W	L	T	GF	GA	GD	W	L	T	GF	GA	GD
28	38	11	12	5	44	43	+1	6	4	4	17	15	+2	5	8	1	27	28	−1

Source: MLS standings
Pld = Matches played; Pts = Points; W = Matches won; T = Matches tied; L = Matches lost; GF = Goals for; GA = Goals against; GD = Goal difference

==== Results by round ====
Round	1	2	3	4	5	6	7	8	9	10	11	12	13	14	15	16	17	18	19	20	21	22	23	24	25	26	27	28
Stadium	H	A	H	H	H	A	A	H	H	A	A	H	H	A	A	H	A	H	H	A	A	A	H	A	H	A	H	A
Result	L	W	L	L	W	L	T	W	T	L	W	W	T	L	L	L	W	T	W	L	W	L	W	W	T	L	W	L

Source: schedule
A = Away; H = Home; W = Win; L = Loss; T = Tie

==== Match results ====
March 23 1	Columbus Crew	0-2	Chicago Fire	Columbus, OH
4:00 PM EST	Torres (yellow card) 28'; Maisonneuve (yellow card) 61'	Report	McCarty 18' (o.g.); Whitfield (yellow card) 31'; Wolff 70'; Bocanegra (red card) 73'	Stadium: Columbus Crew Stadium; Attendance: 18,450; Referee: Kevin Stott; Assistant referees: Craig Lowry; Nate Clement; Fourth official: Gus St. Silva

March 27 2	NY/NJ MetroStars	0-1	Columbus Crew	East Rutherford, NJ
7:30 PM EST	Hernández (yellow card) 23'; Forko (yellow card) 61'	Report	Cunningham 6'; McCarty (yellow card) 27' (yellow-red card) 71'; Denton (yellow card) 60'; Oughton (yellow card) 80'	Stadium: Giants Stadium; Attendance: 45,411; Referee: Gus St. Silva; Assistant referees: Craig Lowry; Steve Taylor; Fourth official: Erich Simmons
Note: Originally scheduled for March 30.

April 6 3	Columbus Crew	1-2 (a.e.t.)	NY/NJ MetroStars	Columbus, OH
7:30 PM EST	Oughton (yellow card) 25'; Washington 58'; Dunseth (yellow card) 70'; Torres (red card) 73'	Report	Addo (yellow card) 11'; Howard (yellow card) 59'; Faria 69'; Davis (yellow card) 82', (goal) 97'; Hernández (yellow card) 89'	Stadium: Columbus Crew Stadium; Attendance: 11,103; Referee: Ricardo Valenzuela; Assistant referees: Steven Davidson; Thomas Supple; Fourth official: Richard Heron

April 20 4	Columbus Crew	0-2	New England Revolution	Columbus, OH
4:00 PM EDT	Clark (yellow card) 35'; Maisonneuve (yellow card) 50'	Report	Twellman 10'; Rooney 28'; Cullen (yellow card) 76'; Heaps (yellow card) 84'	Stadium: Columbus Crew Stadium; Attendance: 13,493; Referee: Gerry Corrie; Assistant referees: Craig Lowry; Chip Reed; Fourth official: Terry Vaughn

April 27 5	Columbus Crew	1-0	D.C. United	Columbus, OH
7:30 PM EDT	Maisonneuve 15'; Harkes (yellow card) 45'; West (yellow card) 60'; Martino (yellow card) 63'; Oughton (yellow card) 70'	Report	Convey (yellow card) 25'; McKinley (yellow card) 33' (yellow-red card) 40'; Etcheverry (yellow card) 42'; Reyes (yellow card) 75'	Stadium: Columbus Crew Stadium; Attendance: 14,997; Referee: Michael Kennedy; Assistant referees: Richard Huber; Kermit Quisenberry; Fourth official: Peter Kokolski

May 4 6	San Jose Earthquakes	3-2	Columbus Crew	San Jose, CA
4:00 PM EDT	Conrad (yellow card) 37'; Barrett 44'; Ekelund 47'; Corrales 90'	Report	Washington 23'; Maisonneuve (yellow card) 36'; Cunningham 43' (pen.)	Stadium: Spartan Stadium; Attendance: 6,317; Referee: Kevin Stott; Assistant referees: David Bragg; Fabio Tovar; Fourth official: Jesse Johnson

May 12 7	D.C. United	1-1 (a.e.t.)	Columbus Crew	Washington, D.C.
4:30 PM EDT	Quaranta 47', (yellow card) 79'	Report	Washington 67'	Stadium: Robert F. Kennedy Memorial Stadium; Attendance: 30,413; Referee: Ali Saheli; Assistant referees: Nate Clement; Steve Taylor; Fourth official: Richard Heron
Note: Originally scheduled for May 11

May 18 8	Columbus Crew	2-0	San Jose Earthquakes	Columbus, OH
7:30 PM EDT	Martino (yellow card) 43'; Buddle 49'; Cunningham 76'; Daniel Torres (yellow card) 90'	Report	Robinson (yellow card) 63'	Stadium: Columbus Crew Stadium; Attendance: 15,712; Referee: Elias Bazakos; Assistant referees: Rob Fereday; Richard Eddy; Fourth official: Michael Kennedy

May 25 9	Columbus Crew	1-1 (a.e.t.)	Dallas Burn	Columbus, OH
7:30 PM EDT	Clark (yellow card) 39'; Cunningham 66'; West (yellow card) 82'; McCarty (yellow card) 90'; Oughton (yellow card) 97'	Report	Pareja (yellow card) 45+2'; Deering (yellow card) 61', (goal) 90+9'; Vaca (yellow card) 90+11'	Stadium: Columbus Crew Stadium; Attendance: 13,773; Referee: Michael Kennedy; Assistant referees: Craig Lowry; Mikael Lundqvist; Fourth official: Terry Vaughn

June 2 10	Chicago Fire	5-4	Columbus Crew	Naperville, IL
7:00 PM EDT	Magee 2', 44'; Razov 31' (pen.), 63'; Bocanegra 80'	Report	Cunningham 25', 28'; Buddle 41'; West (yellow card) 58'; Martino 66'	Stadium: Cardinal Stadium; Attendance: 10,241; Referee: Jair Marrufo; Assistant referees: Richard Huber; David Bragg; Fourth official: Marcel Yonan
Note: Originally scheduled for June 1

June 12 11	New England Revolution	1-2 (a.e.t.)	Columbus Crew	Foxborough, MA
7:00 PM EDT	Ralston 11', (yellow card) 100+1'; Semedo (yellow card) 20'; Heaps (yellow card) 45'; Rooney (yellow card) 72'; Downing (yellow card) 100+1'	Report	Torres (yellow card) 9'; McCarty (yellow card) 16', (goal) 20'; Leitch (yellow card) 90+2'; Buddle 100+1'	Stadium: Gillette Stadium; Attendance: 7,701; Referee: Ricardo Salazar; Assistant referees: Thomas Supple; Bill Dittmar; Fourth official: Erich Simmons

June 15 12	Columbus Crew	2-1	San Jose Earthquakes	Columbus, OH
7:30 PM EDT	Cunningham 31'; Buddle (yellow card) 58'; Washington 83'; Harkes (yellow card) 88'	Report	Barrett (yellow card) 28'; De Rosario 39'	Stadium: Columbus Crew Stadium; Attendance: 19,085; Referee: Jasen Anno; Assistant referees: Jon Wilson; George Gansner; Fourth official: Terry Vaughn

June 19 13	Columbus Crew	1-1 (a.e.t.)	Kansas City Wizards	Columbus, OH
7:30 PM EDT	McCarty (yellow card) 34'; Cunningham 45'	Report	Preki 52'	Stadium: Columbus Crew Stadium; Attendance: 14,089; Referee: Reggie Rutty; Assistant referees: Craig Lowry; Robbie Mann; Fourth official: Elias Bazakos

June 29 14	Dallas Burn	1-0 (a.e.t.)	Columbus Crew	Dallas, TX
8:30 PM EDT	Deering (yellow card) 26'; Kreis (yellow card) 73', (goal) 98'; Rodríguez (yellow card) 81'; Pareja (yellow card) 81'	Report	McCarty (yellow card) 73'	Stadium: Cotton Bowl; Attendance: 16,186; Referee: Elias Bazakos; Assistant referees: Craig Lowry; Chip Reed; Fourth official: Kevin Terry

July 4 15	New England Revolution	4-1	Columbus Crew	Foxborough, MA
7:30 PM EDT	Twellman 11'; Llamosa (yellow card) 22'; Ralston 31', 65'; Cullen 39'; Rooney (yellow card) 68'	Report	Dunseth (yellow card) 13'; McCarty (yellow card) 18'; McBride 82'	Stadium: Gillette Stadium; Attendance: 10,903; Referee: Alex Prus; Assistant referees: Richard Eddy; Bahij Salman; Fourth official: Thomas Supple

July 6 16	Columbus Crew	2-3	NY/NJ MetroStars	Columbus, OH
4:00 PM EDT	Harkes (yellow card) 23'; McBride 29'; Clark (yellow card) 37'; Torres (yellow card) 58'; Cunningham 60'	Report	Faria 5'; Paule 59' (pen.); Jolley 64'	Stadium: Columbus Crew Stadium; Attendance: 19,756; Referee: Jair Marrufo; Assistant referees: Richard Huber; Steven Davidson; Fourth official: Ricardo Salazar

July 13 17	D.C. United	1-3	Columbus Crew	Washington, D.C.
7:30 PM EDT	Convey 39'; Curtis (yellow card) 63'	Report	McBride 27', 40'; Clark (yellow card) 38'; Pérez 50'; Maisonneuve (yellow card) 58'	Stadium: Robert F. Kennedy Memorial Stadium; Attendance: 13,665; Referee: Alex Prus; Assistant referees: Rob Fereday; Jorge De La Bandera; Fourth official: Daniel Stead

July 20 18	Columbus Crew	1-1 (a.e.t.)	Colorado Rapids	Columbus, OH
7:30 PM EDT	Clark (yellow card) 8'; Washington 28'; Dunseth (yellow card) 30'	Report	Mastroeni (yellow card) 78'; Hart (yellow card) 83'; Carrieri 88'	Stadium: Columbus Crew Stadium; Attendance: 21,432; Referee: Ricardo Salazar; Assistant referees: Craig Lowry; Bill Dittmar; Fourth official: Mikael Lundqvist

July 24 19	Columbus Crew	1-0	D.C. United	Columbus, OH
7:30 PM EDT	Maisonneuve (yellow card) 23'; Washington 52'; Leitch (yellow card) 67'; Cunningham (yellow card) 84'	Report	Villegas (yellow card) 25'; Williams (yellow card) 36'	Stadium: Columbus Crew Stadium; Attendance: 17,368; Referee: Erich Simmons; Assistant referees: Chip Reed; Mikael Lundqvist; Fourth official: Hilario Grajeda

July 27 20	Los Angeles Galaxy	2-1	Columbus Crew	Pasadena, CA
10:00 PM EDT	Ruíz 9', 75'; Lalas (yellow card) 90+3'	Report	Clark 41'; Torres (yellow card) 86'; Martino (yellow card) 89'; Dunseth (yellow card) 90'	Stadium: Rose Bowl; Attendance: 14,177; Referee: Gerry Corrie; Assistant referees: Richard Huber; Emiliano Monje; Fourth official: Miguel Chicas

July 31 21	NY/NJ MetroStars	2-3	Columbus Crew	East Rutherford, NJ
7:30 PM EDT	Faria 3'; Jolley (yellow card) 43'; Addo (red card) 45'; Diallo 55'	Report	McBride 19' (pen.); Cunningham 27'; Oughton (yellow card) 30'; Torres (yellow card) 62'; West 70'; Leitch (yellow card) 86'	Stadium: Giants Stadium; Attendance: 10,602; Referee: Rich Grady; Assistant referees: Greg Barkey; Alex Schuster; Fourth official: Alex Prus

August 10 22	Colorado Rapids	2-1	Columbus Crew	Denver, CO
9:00 PM EDT	Palacios (yellow card) 25'; Carrieri 57', (yellow card) 60'; Henderson 64'	Report	McCarty (yellow card) 69'; Buddle 85'	Stadium: Invesco Field at Mile High; Attendance: 13,252; Referee: Gerry Corrie; Assistant referees: Greg Barkey; Jose Andrade; Fourth official: Jose Corro

August 14 23	Columbus Crew	3-2	Los Angeles Galaxy	Columbus, OH
7:30 PM EDT	Clark (yellow card) 64'; Martino 24'; Buddle 28'; Cunningham 78'; Martino (red card) 90+2'	Report	Jones 6'; Ruíz (yellow card) 64'; Elliott 66'; Hartman (red card) 90+2'	Stadium: Columbus Crew Stadium; Attendance: 17,860; Referee: Terry Vaughn; Assistant referees: Francisco Sanchez; Bahij Salman; Fourth official: Jasen Anno

August 18 24	Kansas City Wizards	0-4	Columbus Crew	Kansas City, MO
8:00 PM EDT	Simutenkov (yellow card) 13'; Brunt (yellow card) 21'; McKeon (yellow card) 40'; Zavagnin (yellow card) 89'	Report	Cunningham 11', 61'; Buddle 42', 58'; Torres (yellow card) 86'; García (yellow card) 87'	Stadium: Arrowhead Stadium; Attendance: 8,364; Referee: Ali Saheli; Assistant referees: George Vergara; Chris Strickland; Fourth official: Brian Poeschel

August 31 25	Columbus Crew	0-0 (a.e.t.)	New England Revolution	Columbus, OH
7:30 PM EDT	Oughton (yellow card) 81'	Report	Franchino (yellow card) 33'	Stadium: Columbus Crew Stadium; Attendance: 24,422; Referee: Kevin Terry; Assistant referees: Bill Dittmar; Jose Andrade; Fourth official: Rizal Milliken

September 7 26	San Jose Earthquakes	4-3 (a.e.t.)	Columbus Crew	San Jose, CA
10:00 PM EDT	Robinson 4'; Ekelund 22'; Barrett (yellow card) 24'; Robinson (yellow card) 32'; Ekelund (yellow card) 34'; Graziani 53'; Dunseth 97' (o.g.)	Report	McBride (yellow card) 15'; Cunningham 28'; Clark (yellow card) 45'; Buddle 59', 82'; McCarty (yellow card) 63' (yellow-red card) 94'	Stadium: Spartan Stadium; Attendance: 14,792; Referee: Gus St. Silva; Assistant referees: Jorge Reyes; Emiliano Monje; Fourth official: Brian Hall

September 14 27	Columbus Crew	2-0	Chicago Fire	Columbus, OH
7:30 PM EDT	Denton 15'; Cunningham 22'; Oughton (yellow card) 31'; Leitch (yellow card) 71'	Report	Bocanegra (yellow card) 28'; Nowak (yellow card) 57'; Walsh (yellow card) 78'	Stadium: Columbus Crew Stadium; Attendance: 22,459; Referee: Kevin Terry; Assistant referees: Richard Huber; Richard Eddy; Fourth official: Hilario Grajeda

September 22 28	Chicago Fire	2-1	Columbus Crew	Naperville, IL
4:00 PM EDT	Nowak 72'; Kovalenko (yellow card) 79'; Razov 81'	Report	Buddle (yellow card) 13'; García (yellow card) 40'; Cunningham (yellow card) 40', (goal) 90+3'; Dunseth (yellow card) 74'	Stadium: Cardinal Stadium; Attendance: 15,487; Referee: Richard Heron; Assistant referees: Richard Eddy; Steve Taylor; Fourth official: Ricardo Salazar

=== MLS Cup Playoffs ===
==== Quarterfinals ====
September 25 Game 1	San Jose Earthquakes	1-2	Columbus Crew	San Jose, CA
10:00 PM EDT	Corrales (yellow card) 21'; Donovan 54'; Russell (yellow card) 77'; Agoos (yellow card) 78'	Report	Buddle 38'; García 81'	Stadium: Spartan Stadium; Attendance: 8,069; Referee: Ricardo Salazar; Assistant referees: Paul Scott; Chip Reed; Fourth official: Ali Saheli

September 28 Game 2	Columbus Crew	2-1	San Jose Earthquakes	Columbus, OH
7:30 PM EDT	Clark (yellow card) 46'; García 50'; McBride 81'	Report	Graziani 58'; Robinson (yellow card) 76'	Stadium: Columbus Crew Stadium; Attendance: 13,004; Referee: Jair Marrufo; Assistant referees: Rob Fereday; Francisco Sanchez; Fourth official: Michael Kennedy
Note: Columbus Crew advances to the semifinals 6 points to 0

October 2 Game 3	San Jose Earthquakes	If Necessary	Columbus Crew	San Jose, CA
10:00 PM EDT		Report		Stadium: Spartan Stadium

==== Semifinals ====
October 6 Game 1	New England Revolution	0-0 (a.e.t.)	Columbus Crew	Foxborough, MA
4:00 PM EDT	Kanté (yellow card) 56' (red card) 82'; Hernández (yellow card) 83'	Report	Maisonneuve (yellow card) 13'; Cunningham (yellow card) 38'; Torres (yellow card) 52'; McBride (yellow card) 85'; Oughton (yellow card) 88'	Stadium: Gillette Stadium; Attendance: 11,387; Referee: Brian Hall; Assistant referees: George Vergara; Chip Reed; Fourth official: Gerry Corrie

October 9 Game 2	Columbus Crew	0-1	New England Revolution	Columbus, OH
7:30 PM EDT	García (yellow card) 40'; Dunseth (yellow card) 79'; Oughton (yellow card) 90+1'	Report	Heaps 3', (yellow card) 38' (red card) 39'	Stadium: Columbus Crew Stadium; Attendance: 10,245; Referee: Gerry Corrie; Assistant referees: Craig Lowry; Richard Eddy; Fourth official: Michael Kennedy

October 12 Game 3	New England Revolution	2-2 (a.e.t.)	Columbus Crew	Foxborough, MA
4:00 PM EDT	Ralston 17'; Harris 7'	Report	McBride 80'; Washington 85'	Stadium: Gillette Stadium; Attendance: 9,216; Referee: Kevin Stott; Assistant referees: Nate Clement; George Gansner; Fourth official: Terry Vaughn
Note: New England Revolution advances to MLS Cup 2002 5 points to 2

=== U.S. Open Cup ===
July 17 Third Round	Columbus Crew (MLS) (Ohio)	3-0	(Virginia) Richmond Kickers (A-L)	Columbus, OH
	Dunseth (yellow card) 1'; McBride 34' (pen.); Washington 68', 73'	Report	Jeffrey (yellow card) 31'; Fox (yellow card) 42'; Luzak (yellow card) 59'; Ukrop (red card) 87'	Stadium: Columbus Crew Stadium; Attendance: 7,887; Referee: Misail Tsapos; Assistant referees: Mikael Lundqvist; Hilario Grajedo; Fourth official: Rizal Millikaen

August 7 Quarterfinals	NY/NJ MetroStars (MLS) (New Jersey)	1-2	(Ohio) Columbus Crew (MLS)	Uniondale, NY
9:15 EDT	Jolley (yellow card) 28'; Moore (yellow card) 31'; Williams (yellow card) 42'; Faria 49'	Report	McBride 34'; Martino 46'; Oughton (yellow card) 60'	Stadium: Mitchel Athletic Complex; Attendance: 8,314; Referee: Brian Poeschel; Assistant referees: Greg Barkey; Chip Reed; Fourth official: Kevin Stott

September 10 Semifinals	Columbus Crew (MLS) (Ohio)	3-2 (a.e.t.)	(Missouri) Kansas City Wizards (MLS)	Columbus, OH
8:00 EDT	Buddle (yellow card) 10', (goal) 76'; Martino (yellow card) 42'; McCarty (yellow card) 55'; Pérez 90', 108'	Report	McCarty 2' (o.g.); Arnaud (yellow card) 16'; Talley (yellow card) 44'; Quill 62'; Preki (yellow card) 95'	Stadium: Columbus Crew Stadium; Attendance: 3,132; Referee: Kevin Stott

October 24 Final	Columbus Crew (MLS) (Ohio)	1-0	(California) Los Angeles Galaxy (MLS)	Columbus, OH
7:30 PM EDT	Ruiz (yellow card) 8'	Report	Clark (yellow card) 4'; McCarty (yellow card) 48' (yellow-red card) 83'; García 30'	Stadium: Columbus Crew Stadium; Attendance: 6,054; Referee: Brian Hall; Assistant referees: Craig Lowry; Steven Davidson; Fourth official: Ricardo Salazar

== Statistics ==
=== Appearances and goals ===
Under "Apps" for each section, the first number represents the number of starts, and the second number represents appearances as a substitute.

No.	Pos	Nat	Player	Total		MLS		MLS Cup Playoffs		U.S. Open Cup	
No.	Pos	Nat	Player	Apps	Goals	Apps	Goals	Apps	Goals	Apps	Goals
1	GK	(United States) USA	Jon Busch	23	0	13+1	0	5+0	0	4+0	0
3	DF	(United States) USA	Mike Clark	28	1	19+2	1	3+0	0	4+0	0
4	DF	(Costa Rica) CRC	Daniel Torres	32	0	23+2	0	2+2	0	2+1	0
5	DF	(United States) USA	Chad McCarty	27	1	13+5	1	5+0	0	2+2	0
7	MF	(United States) USA	John Harkes	11	0	7+4	0	0+0	0	0+0	0
8	DF	(New Zealand) NZL	Duncan Oughton	29	0	17+3	0	5+0	0	3+1	0
9	FW	(United States) USA	Dante Washington	27	9	12+9	6	0+2	1	1+3	2
10	MF	(United States) USA	Brian Maisonneuve	35	1	26+0	1	4+1	0	4+0	0
11	FW	(United States) USA	Jeff Cunningham	35	16	21+6	16	5+0	0	3+0	0
12	FW	(United States) USA	Edson Buddle	26	11	13+8	9	3+0	1	1+1	1
13	DF	(United States) USA	Brian Dunseth	36	0	26+1	0	5+0	0	4+0	0
14	MF	(Colombia) COL	John Wilmar Pérez	25	3	13+7	1	1+2	0	1+1	2
15	MF	(Guatemala) GUA	Freddy Garcia	13	3	1+4	0	5+0	2	1+2	1
16	DF	(United States) USA	Eric Denton	32	1	22+1	1	5+0	0	3+1	0
17	FW	(United States) USA	Brian West	33	1	22+2	1	1+4	0	3+1	0
19	MF	(Poland) POL	Robert Warzycha	15	0	3+12	0	0+0	0	0+0	0
20	FW	(United States) USA	Brian McBride	23	9	14+0	5	5+0	2	4+0	2
21	MF	(United States) USA	Kyle Martino	30	3	15+7	2	1+3	0	2+2	1
22	GK	(United States) USA	Tom Presthus	15	0	15+0	0	0+0	0	0+0	0
23	DF	(United States) USA	Chris Leitch	15	0	11+2	0	0+0	0	2+0	0
24	MF	(United States) USA	Jeff Matteo	1	0	0+1	0	0+0	0	0+0	0
			Own goal	0	0	-	0	-	0	-	0
Players who left Columbus during the season:
2	DF	(United States) USA	Mike Lapper	4	0	1+3	0	0+0	0	0+0	0
6	MF	(United States) USA	Todd Yeagley	3	0	1+2	0	0+0	0	0+0	0
25	MF	(United States) USA	Scott Powers	0	0	0+0	0	0+0	0	0+0	0
31	GK	(United States) USA	Chris Wanamaker	0	0	0+0	0	0+0	0	0+0	0

=== Disciplinary record ===
No.	Pos.	Name	MLS		MLS Cup Playoffs		U.S. Open Cup		Total	
No.	Pos.	Name	Booked	Sent off (straight red)	Booked	Sent off (straight red)	Booked	Sent off (straight red)	Booked	Sent off (straight red)
1	GK	(United States) Jon Busch	0	0	0	0	0	0	0	0
3	DF	(United States) Mike Clark	7	0	1	0	1	0	9	0
4	DF	(Costa Rica) Daniel Torres	7	1	1	0	0	0	8	1
5	DF	(United States) Chad McCarty	8	2	0	0	3	1	11	3
7	MF	(United States) John Harkes	3	0	0	0	0	0	3	0
8	DF	(New Zealand) Duncan Oughton	7	0	1	0	1	0	9	0
9	FW	(United States) Dante Washington	0	0	0	0	0	0	0	0
10	MF	(United States) Brian Maisonneuve	5	0	1	0	0	0	6	0
11	FW	(United States) Jeff Cunningham	2	0	1	0	0	0	3	0
12	FW	(United States) Edson Buddle	2	0	0	0	1	0	3	0
13	DF	(United States) Brian Dunseth	5	0	1	0	1	0	7	0
14	MF	(Colombia) John Wilmar Pérez	0	0	0	0	0	0	0	0
15	MF	(Guatemala) Freddy Garcia	2	0	1	0	0	0	3	0
16	DF	(United States) Eric Denton	1	0	1	0	0	0	2	0
17	FW	(United States) Brian West	3	0	0	0	0	0	3	0
19	MF	(Poland) Robert Warzycha	1	0	0	0	0	0	1	0
20	FW	(United States) Brian McBride	1	0	1	0	0	0	2	0
21	MF	(United States) Kyle Martino	3	1	0	0	1	0	4	1
22	GK	(United States) Tom Presthus	0	0	0	0	0	0	0	0
23	DF	(United States) Chris Leitch	3	0	0	0	0	0	3	0
24	MF	(United States) Jeff Matteo	0	0	0	0	0	0	0	0
Players who left Columbus during the season:
2	DF	(United States) Mike Lapper	0	0	0	0	0	0	0	0
6	MF	(United States) Todd Yeagley	0	0	0	0	0	0	0	0
25	MF	(United States) Scott Powers	0	0	0	0	0	0	0	0
31	GK	(United States) Chris Wanamaker	0	0	0	0	0	0	0	0

=== Clean sheets ===
No.	Name	MLS	MLS Cup Playoffs	U.S. Open Cup	Total	Games Played
1	(United States) Jon Busch	5	1	2	9	23
22	(United States) Tom Presthus	2	0	0	2	15
Players who left Columbus during the season:
31	(United States) Chris Wanamaker	0	0	0	0	0

== Transfers ==
=== In ===
Pos.	Player	Transferred from	Fee/notes	Date	Source
DF	(United States) Brian Dunseth	(United States) Miami Fusion F.C.	Drafted in round 1 of the 2002 MLS Dispersal Draft	January 11, 2002	
DF	(United States) Eric Denton	(United States) Tampa Bay Mutiny	Drafted in round 1 of the 2002 MLS Dispersal Draft	January 11, 2002	
DF	(United States) Chad McCarty	(United States) Tampa Bay Mutiny	Drafted in the 2002 MLS Waiver Draft	January 17, 2002	
MF	(United States) Kyle Martino	(United States) Virginia Cavaliers	Drafted in round 1 of the 2002 MLS SuperDraft	February 10, 2002	
GK	(United States) Jon Busch	(United States) Hershey Wildcats	Drafted in round 2 of the 2002 MLS SuperDraft	February 10, 2002	
MF	(United States) John Harkes	(United States) Columbus Crew	Free agent; signed to a one-year contract	March 13, 2002	
DF	(United States) Chris Leitch	(United States) North Carolina Tar Heels	Drafted in round 4 of the 2002 MLS SuperDraft. Signed to developmental contract. Signed a standard contract on August 16, 2002.	March 15, 2002	
MF	(Guatemala) Freddy García	(Guatemala) C.S.D. Municipal	Signed via discovery	July 15, 2002	
MF	(United States) Jeff Matteo	(United States) St. John's Red Storm	Drafted in round 2 of the 2002 MLS SuperDraft. Signed to developmental contract.	August 13, 2002	

=== Loan in ===
Pos.	Player	Parent club	Length/Notes	Beginning	End	Source
GK	(United States) Chris Wanamaker	(United States) Cincinnati Riverhawks	Short term agreement	April 26, 2002	April 28, 2002	

=== Out ===
Pos.	Player	Transferred to	Fee/notes	Date	Source
DF	(Uganda) Tenywa Bonseu	(United States) Dallas Burn	Traded with a fourth round draft pick in the 2002 MLS SuperDraft for a second round draft pick in the 2002 MLS SuperDraft	January 15, 2002	
DF	(Trinidad and Tobago) Ancil Elcock	(Trinidad and Tobago) San Juan Jabloteh F.C.	Placed on waivers	January 15, 2002	
MF	(United States) John Harkes	(United States) Columbus Crew	Contract expired	January 15, 2002	
GK	(United States) Mark Dougherty	Retired		February 18, 2002	
MF	(United States) Scott Powers	(United States) New England Revolution		May 17, 2002	
MF	(United States) Todd Yeagley	Retired	Took position of Assistant to the President/General Manager	June 25, 2002	
DF	(United States) Mike Lapper	Retired	Took position of Director of Soccer Business Development	July 11, 2002	
MF	(Poland) Robert Warzycha	Retired	Took position of Assistant Coach	December 16, 2002	
MF	(United States) John Harkes	Retired	Contract expired	December 31, 2002	
MF	(Colombia) John Wilmar Pérez	(Colombia) Independiente Medellín	Contract expired	December 31, 2002	

=== MLS Draft picks ===
Draft picks are not automatically signed to the team roster. Only those who are signed to a contract will be listed as transfers in. The picks for the Columbus Crew are listed below:

2002 Columbus Crew Dispersal Draft Picks
Round	Pick	Player	Position	Team
1	7	(United States) Brian Dunseth	DF	Miami Fusion F.C.
1	9	(United States) Eric Denton	DF	Tampa Bay Mutiny

January 2002 Columbus Crew Waiver Draft Picks
Round	Pick	Player	Position	Team
1	4	(United States) Chad McCarty	DF	Tampa Bay Mutiny

2002 Columbus Crew SuperDraft Picks
Round	Pick	Player	Position	College
1	8	(United States) Kyle Martino	MF	Virginia
2	20	(United States) Jeff Matteo	MF	St. John's
2	23	(United States) Jon Busch	GK	UNC Charlotte
3	35	(Bermuda) John Barry Nusum	FW	Furman
4	47	(United States) Chris Leitch	DF	North Carolina
5	51	(United States) Christof Lindenmayer	FW	Loyola University Maryland
6	67	(United States) Scott Leber	DF	Stanford

November 2002 Columbus Crew Waiver Draft Picks
Round	Pick	Player	Position	Team
1	7	(United States) Luchi Gonzalez	FW	San Jose Earthquakes

== Awards ==
=== MLS Player of the Week ===
Week	Player	Opponent(s)	Link
20	(United States) Jeff Cunningham	NY/NJ MetroStars	

=== MLS Player of the Month ===
Month	Player	Stats	Link
August	(United States) Edson Buddle	4 goals, 2 assists	

=== 2002 MLS All-Star Game ===
Starters

- MF Brian Maisonneuve
- FW Brian McBride

Reserves

- MF John Harkes

=== Postseason ===
MLS Rookie of the Year

- MF Kyle Martino

MLS Best XI

- FW Jeff Cunningham

=== Crew Team Awards ===
- Most Valuable Player – Jeff Cunningham
- Defensive Player of the Year – Jon Busch
- Scoring Champion – Jeff Cunningham
- Man of the Year – Brian McBride
- Coach's Award – Edson Buddle
- Goal of the Year – Edson Buddle
- Humanitarian of the Year – Brian Dunseth
- Hardest Working Man of the Year – Duncan Oughton
- Comeback Player of the Year – Brian McBride
