= List of Columbus Crew head coaches =

A memorial dedicated to Tom Fitzgerald at Historic Crew Stadium. Fitzgerald is the winningest head coach in Crew history.

The Columbus Crew is a professional soccer team in the United States. The team is a member of the Eastern Conference of Major League Soccer, the top professional soccer league of the United States and Canada. The Crew has had nine different head coaches since joining the league in 1996, one of whom served only in an interim capacity. Timo Liekoski, the only Finnish head coach in MLS history, was the first head coach in 1996, but started 6–16 with just 14 points in its first 22 games, lowest in the league by seven points, and was fired midseason to be replaced by Tom Fitzgerald, who would lead the Crew to the playoffs, amusing 7 wins, 2 draws, and a single loss after taking over for Timo Liekoski.

Tom Fitzgerald would take the Crew to the finals of the 1998 Lamar Hunt U.S. Open Cup. Fitzgerald is the club's leader in career wins (86) and playoff wins (nine), and is tied with Gregg Berhalter for first in playoff appearances (four). On May 17, 2001, it was announced that Fitzgerald would be let go by the team.

Greg Andrulis, who replaced Tom Fitzgerald as head coach on an interim basis after the firing of Fitzgerald, became the full-time head coach of the Crew on Oct. 25, 2001. He achieved a significant milestone by leading the Columbus Crew to their first major tournament victory in 2002, winning the Lamar Hunt U.S. Open Cup. In 2004, under Andrulis' guidance, the team won the Supporters' Shield for having the best regular-season record, while also winning an individual award; MLS Coach of the Year, the first time a Crew head coach won the honor. However, Andrulis, who had been with the team since 1997 as an assistant, was fired during the halfway point of the 2005 season, with assistant coach Robert Warzycha taking over for the remainder of the season on an interim basis.

When Sigi Schmid began the 2006 season, it was the first time since the team's founding that a new coach took over in the off-season. He coached the team from 2006 through 2008 and implemented an offense based on ball possession and flank speed, focusing on a cautious, strategic style rather than taking unnecessary risks, and centered on roaming playmaker Guillermo Barros Schelotto. Those tactics, along with solid defensive play, which was crucial for gaining possession and creating attacking opportunities, led Columbus to its first MLS Cup championship in 2008, a season in which he also won MLS Coach of the Year, the most recent Crew coach to have won the award. After that season, Schmid left to coach the newly formed Seattle Sounders FC, and former player and assistant coach Robert Warzycha replaced him.

Warzycha was the Crew's head coach from 2009 to 2013, and started his run as head coach 0–2–5 for five points. Columbus finished the 2009 season as Supporter's Shield winners, but bowed out in the 2009 Conference semifinals against Real Salt Lake, with Warzycha making the controversial decision to bench Guillermo Barros Schelotto in game one of the series. Discontent grew during the 2010 and 2011 seasons, with critics attributing the team's success to Schmid's roster while the Crew jettisoned well-known names to begin a rebuild, including Guillermo Barros Schelotto and captain Frankie Hejduk. Warzycha's vision for the team involved a more methodical buildup rather than the direct style they had played with Schelotto, as he believed that under Schelotto, the team relied too heavily on long balls and set pieces. Warzycha wanted more attacking opportunities for the wingers, which he found difficult with Schelotto playing as a withdrawn forward. Columbus would make the playoffs in 2010 and 2011, but exited in the first round both times. Things worsened in 2012, as the Crew missed the playoffs by one point—the first time during Warzycha's tenure that the team would miss the playoffs. However, 2012 was not a total loss, as Central Ohio welcomed its newest Designated Player, Federico Higuaín. The 2013 season was lackluster once again. In the summer fans demonstrated their discontent by throwing pink slips during Warzycha's pre-game introductions, signaling a lack of support. The U.S. Open Cup during Warzycha's time was largely unforgettable, as the 2009 edition saw Columbus lose in their opening round to the Rochester Rhinos of Division II USL-1, the 2010 U.S. Open Cup saw Columbus make it to the final, losing to a Seattle Sounders team led by Sigi Schmid. The next two editions of the U.S. Open Cup after 2010 were both home losses in the opening round suffered by Division III clubs Richmond Kickers in 2011 and the Dayton Dutch Lions in 2012. The 2013 tournament saw the Crew eliminated in the fourth round by the Chicago Fire. On September 2, 2013, he was let go by the Crew, with Brian Bliss becoming the interim. Warzycha's overall record of 70–59–41 leaves him tied with Tom Fitzgerald for the most regular-season wins as head coach of Columbus.

Gregg Berhalter was named as head coach as well as sporting director, overseeing all player personnel decisions on November 6, 2013. While with Columbus, Berhalter used a 4-2-3-1 formation and emphasized a style focused on ball possession and quick, offensive attacks aimed at breaking down defenses, stressing the importance of quick ball movement and positioning players effectively to achieve this. He also highlighted his desire for fullbacks to push forward and contribute to the attack frequently, while also applying pressure to quickly regain possession after losing the ball. The Berhalter-coached Columbus Crew teams reached the MLS Cup Playoffs in four out of five seasons, and despite working with a salary budget that ranked in the league's lower half each year, Berhalter led the team to the 2015 MLS Cup Final, losing to the Portland Timbers, coached by Caleb Porter.

On January 4, 2019, the aforementioned Caleb Porter was named as head coach, after Gregg Berhalter left to coach the United States men's national soccer team. Porter led the Crew to its second MLS Cup championship, beating Seattle Sounders FC 3–0, as well as winning the 2021 Campeones Cup. After not making the playoffs in either of the next two seasons after winning the championship, the Crew parted ways with Porter after the 2022 season.

On December 6, 2022, Wilfried Nancy was named as head coach, being hired away from CF Montréal. Columbus would conclude the 2023 regular season as the top-scoring team in MLS, marking the first instance in the franchise's history. Nancy would guide the Crew to an MLS Cup victory his first season in charge, beating the defending champions Los Angeles FC 2–1. With that victory, Nancy also became the first Black head coach in MLS history to win MLS Cup.

== Coaches ==
As of February 1, 2025

Coach	Tenure	MLS Regular Season			MLS Cup Playoffs				U.S. Open Cup		Honors
Coach	Tenure	W	L	D	Apps	W	L	D	W	L	Honors
(Finland) Timo Liekoski	December 5, 1995 – August 2, 1996	6	16	–	0	—			—		
(United States) Tom Fitzgerald	August 2, 1996 – May 17, 2001	70	67	7	4	9	8	0	7	3	
(United States) Greg Andrulis	May 17, 2001 – July 16, 2005	49	43	32	3	2	4	3	8	3	U.S. Open Cup – 2002; Supporters' Shield – 2004; MLS Coach of the Year – 2004
(Poland) Robert Warzycha (interim)	July 16, 2005 – October 20, 2005	7	6	3	0	—			0	1	
(Germany) Sigi Schmid	October 20, 2005 – December 16, 2008	34	33	25	1	3	0	1	2	3	MLS Cup Champion – 2008; Supporters' Shield – 2008; MLS Coach of the Year – 2008
(Poland) Robert Warzycha	December 23, 2008 – September 2, 2013	63	53	38	3	1	4	0	3	4	Supporters' Shield – 2009
(United States) Brian Bliss (interim)	September 2, 2013 – November 6, 2013	4	4	0	0	—			—		
(United States) Gregg Berhalter	November 6, 2013 – December 2, 2018	67	58	45	4	4	8	3	3	5	
(United States) Caleb Porter	January 4, 2019 – October 10, 2022	45	43	47	1	4	0	0	1	2	MLS Cup Champion - 2020; Campeones Cup - 2021
(France) Wilfried Nancy	December 6, 2022 – December 4, 2025	35	15	18	2	5	2	1	2	1	MLS Cup Champion - 2023; Leagues Cup - 2024; MLS Coach of the Year – 2024
(Sweden) Henrik Rydström	December 31, 2025 – May 17, 2026	5	4	7	0	0	0	0	0	0	
(France) Laurent Courtois (interim)	May 17, 2026 – present	0	0	0	0	0	0	0	0	0	
