= 2001 Major League Soccer season =

6th season of Major League Soccer

- Season: 2001
- Teams: 12
- MLS Cup: San Jose Earthquakes (1st title)
- Supporters' Shield: Miami Fusion (1st shield)
- 2002 CONCACAF Champions' Cup: San Jose Earthquakes
- Matches: 158
- Goals: 519 (3.28 per match)
- Top goalscorer: Alex Pineda Chacon; Miami Fusion F.C. Goals: 19
- Highest attendance: D.C. United; Season: 258,213; Game Avg.: 21,518
- Lowest attendance: San Jose Earthquakes; Season: 125,250; Game Avg.: 9,635
- Total attendance: 2,363,859
- Average attendance: 14,961

Locations of teams for the 2001 Major League Soccer season
Western Division Central Division Eastern Division

The 2001 Major League Soccer season was the sixth season of Major League Soccer. It was also the 89th season of FIFA-sanctioned soccer in the United States, and the 23rd with a national first-division league.

The season was shortened due to the September 11 attacks, with the final weeks' regular season matches being canceled. Due to the different number of games played, playoff ordering was determined by points per game, instead of total points.

The regular season began on April 7, and concluded prematurely on September 9. The 2001 MLS Cup Playoffs began on September 20, and concluded with MLS Cup 2001 on October 21. The Miami Fusion won their first Supporters' Shield and the San Jose Earthquakes defeated the Los Angeles Galaxy in the final to win their first MLS Cup.

== Overview ==
=== Season format ===
The season began on April 7 and concluded with MLS Cup on October 21. The 12 teams were split into three divisions. Each team was to play 28 games that were evenly divided between home and away. Each team would play every other team in their division four times, for a total of 12 games. The remaining schedule was to consist of two games against the remaining eight teams, for a total of 16 games.

The eight teams with the most points per game qualified for the MLS Cup Playoffs. The quarterfinals and semifinals were played as a best-of-three series, and the winners advanced to MLS Cup. In all rounds, draws were broken by penalty shootout if necessary. The away goals rule was not used in any round.

The team with the most points in the regular season was awarded the MLS Supporters' Shield. The winner of MLS Cup, and the runner-up, qualified for the CONCACAF Champions' Cup.

=== Stadiums and locations ===
Team	Stadium	Capacity
Chicago Fire	Soldier Field	66,944
Colorado Rapids	Mile High Stadium	76,273
Columbus Crew	Columbus Crew Stadium	22,555
D.C. United	RFK Stadium	46,000
Dallas Burn	Cotton Bowl	92,100
Kansas City Wizards	Arrowhead Stadium	81,425
Los Angeles Galaxy	Rose Bowl	92,542
Miami Fusion	Lockhart Stadium	20,450
New England Revolution	Foxboro Stadium	60,292
MetroStars	Giants Stadium	80,200
San Jose Earthquakes	Spartan Stadium	30,456
Tampa Bay Mutiny	Raymond James Stadium	69,218

=== Personnel and sponsorships ===
Team	Head coach	Captain	Shirt sponsor
Chicago Fire	(United States) Bob Bradley		—
Colorado Rapids	(United States) Tim Hankinson		
Columbus Crew	(United States) Greg Andrulis		—
D.C. United	(Netherlands) Thomas Rongen		MasterCard
Dallas Burn	(United States) Mike Jeffries		
Kansas City Wizards	(United States) Bob Gansler		—
Los Angeles Galaxy	(United States) Sigi Schmid		—
MetroStars	(Ecuador) Octavio Zambrano	(United States) Tab Ramos	New York Life
Miami Fusion	(England) Ray Hudson		—
New England Revolution	(United States) Fernando Clavijo		—
San Jose Earthquakes	(Canada) Frank Yallop	(United States) Jeff Agoos	Yahoo! Sports
Tampa Bay Mutiny	(United States) Perry Van der Beck		

=== Coaching changes ===
Team	Outgoing coach	Manner of departure	Date of vacancy	Incoming coach	Date of appointment
Columbus Crew	(United States) Tom Fitzgerald	Fired	May 17, 2001	(United States) Greg Andrulis	May 17, 2001
Tampa Bay Mutiny	(Spain) Alfonso Mondelo	Resigned	July 5, 2001	(United States) Perry Van der Beck	July 5, 2001

== Standings ==
=== Eastern Division ===
Pos	Team	Pld	W	L	T	GF	GA	GD	Pts	Qualification
1	Miami Fusion	26	16	5	5	57	36	+21	53	Qualification for the quarterfinals
2	MetroStars	26	13	10	3	38	35	+3	42	Qualification for the quarterfinals
3	New England Revolution	27	7	14	6	35	52	−17	27	
4	D.C. United	26	8	16	2	42	50	−8	26	

Source: MLS

=== Central Division ===
Pos	Team	Pld	W	L	T	GF	GA	GD	Pts	Qualification
1	Chicago Fire	27	16	6	5	50	30	+20	53	Qualification for the quarterfinals
2	Columbus Crew	26	13	7	6	49	36	+13	45	Qualification for the quarterfinals
3	Dallas Burn	26	10	11	5	48	47	+1	35	Qualification for the quarterfinals
4	Tampa Bay Mutiny	27	4	21	2	32	68	−36	14	

Source: MLS

=== Western Division ===
Pos	Team	Pld	W	L	T	GF	GA	GD	Pts	Qualification
1	Los Angeles Galaxy	26	14	7	5	52	36	+16	47	Qualification for the quarterfinals
2	San Jose Earthquakes	26	13	7	6	47	29	+18	45	Qualification for the quarterfinals
3	Kansas City Wizards	27	11	13	3	33	53	−20	36	Qualification for the quarterfinals
4	Colorado Rapids	26	5	13	8	36	47	−11	23	

Source: MLS

=== Overall standings ===
Pos	Team	Pld	W	L	T	GF	GA	GD	Pts	PPG	Qualification
1	Miami Fusion (S)	26	16	5	5	57	36	+21	53	2.04	Qualification for the CONCACAF Champions' Cup
2	Chicago Fire	27	16	6	5	50	30	+20	53	1.96	
3	Los Angeles Galaxy	26	14	7	5	52	36	+16	47	1.81	
4	Columbus Crew	26	13	7	6	49	36	+13	45	1.73	
5	San Jose Earthquakes (C)	26	13	7	6	47	29	+18	45	1.73	Qualification for the CONCACAF Champions' Cup
6	MetroStars	26	13	10	3	38	35	+3	42	1.62	
7	Dallas Burn	26	10	11	5	48	47	+1	35	1.35	
8	Kansas City Wizards	27	11	13	3	33	53	−20	36	1.33	
9	New England Revolution	27	7	14	6	35	52	−17	27	1.00	
10	D.C. United	26	8	16	2	42	50	−8	26	1.00	
11	Colorado Rapids	26	5	13	8	36	47	−11	23	0.88	
12	Tampa Bay Mutiny	27	4	21	2	32	68	−36	14	0.52	

Source: MLS
Rules for classification: 1) points per game; 2) total goal differential per match played; 3) total goals scored per match played; 4) away record; 5) away goal differential; 6) total goals scored in away matches; 7) home record; 8) home goal differential; 9) total goals scored in home matches; 10) fewest disciplinary points per match played; 6) away goal differential per away match played; 11) coin toss or drawing of lots.
(C) MLS Cup champions; (S) Supporters' Shield winners

== MLS Cup playoffs ==
=== Bracket ===
Quarterfinals
2	Chicago Fire (7 Points)	2	1	2
7	Dallas Burn (1 Points)	0	1	0
3	Los Angeles Galaxy (SDET)* (4 Points)	1	1	3*
6	MetroStars (4 Points)	1	4	2
1	Miami Fusion (6 Points)	2	0	2
8	Kansas City Wizards (3 Points)	0	3	1
4	Columbus Crew (0 Points)	1	0	x
5	San Jose Earthquakes (6 Points)	3	3	x

Semifinals
2	Chicago Fire (1 Points)	1	0	1
3	Los Angeles Galaxy (ASDET)* (7 Points)	1	1*	2*
1	Miami Fusion (3 Points)	1	0	0
5	San Jose Earthquakes (SDET)* (6 Points)	0	4	1*

MLS Cup
3	Los Angeles Galaxy	1
5	San Jose Earthquakes (ASDET)*	2

- Points system
  Win = 3 Pts.
  Loss = 0 Pts.
  Draw = 1 Pt.
- ASDET*=Added sudden death extra time (game tie breaker)
  SDET**=Sudden death extra time (series tie breaker)
  Teams will advance at 5 points.

=== Quarterfinals ===
September 20, 2001

Dallas Burn	0–2	Chicago Fire
		Bocanegra 40'; Whitfield 90'+

Soldier Field
Chicago, Illinois
Attendance: 8,314
September 23, 2001

Chicago Fire	1–1	Dallas Burn
J. Beasley 84'		Deering 27'

Cotton Bowl
Dallas, Texas
Attendance:: 17,149
September 29, 2001

Dallas Burn	0–2	Chicago Fire
		Kovalenko 17'; Armas 55'

Soldier Field
Chicago, Illinois
Attendance: 12,811

Chicago Fire advance 7–1 on points.

September 22, 2001

Kansas City Wizards	0–2	Miami Fusion
		Serna 28'; Pineda Chacón 53'

Lockhart Stadium
Fort Lauderdale, Florida
Attendance: 6,281
September 26, 2001

Miami Fusion	0–3	Kansas City Wizards
		Lowe 24'; McKeon 31' (pen.); Gomez 45'+

Arrowhead Stadium
Kansas City, Missouri
Attendance: 5,803
September 29, 2001

Kansas City Wizards	1–2	Miami Fusion
Lowe 13'		Preki 14'; Henderson 71'

Lockhart Stadium
Fort Lauderdale, Florida
Attendance: 8,119

Miami Fusion advance 6–3 on points.

September 23, 2001

MetroStars	1–1	Los Angeles Galaxy
Faria 29'		Caligiuri 63'

Rose Bowl
Pasadena, California
Attendance: 11,580
September 26, 2001

Los Angeles Galaxy	1–4	MetroStars
Victorine 4'		Faria 72', 80'; Chung 75'; Valencia 83'

Giants Stadium
East Rutherford, New Jersey
Attendance: 12,817
September 29, 2001

MetroStars	2–3	Los Angeles Galaxy
Villegas 49', 60'		Victorine 21', 33'; Frye 56'

Rose Bowl
Pasadena, California
Attendance: 6,154

0–1 series (SDET)
	Cienfuegos 8'

Los Angeles Galaxy advance 1-0 in series overtime (SDET) after 4-4 tie on points.

September 22, 2001

San Jose Earthquakes	3–1	Columbus Crew
Donovan 5' 45'+ Lagos 31'		Warzycha 54' (pen.)

Columbus Crew Stadium
Columbus, Ohio
Attendance: 20,883
September 26, 2001

Columbus Crew	0–3	San Jose Earthquakes
		Lagos 9'; Cerritos 68'; Donovan 76'

Spartan Stadium
San Jose, California
Attendance: 10,419

San Jose Earthquakes advance 6–0 on points.

=== Semifinals ===
October 10, 2001

Los Angeles Galaxy	1–1	Chicago Fire
Hernández 44'		Wynalda 32'

Soldier Field
Chicago, Illinois
Attendance: 10,388
October 13, 2001

Chicago Fire	0–1 (AET)	Los Angeles Galaxy
		Vagenas 94'

Rose Bowl
Pasadena, California
Attendance: 10,100
October 17, 2001

Los Angeles Galaxy	2–1 (AET)	Chicago Fire
Califf 44'; Cienfuegos 98'		D. Beasley 30'

Soldier Field
Chicago, Illinois
Attendance: 13,444

Los Angeles Galaxy advance 7–1 on points.

October 10, 2001

San Jose Earthquakes	0–1	Miami Fusion
		Preki 53'

Lockhart Stadium
Fort Lauderdale, Florida
Attendance: 9,236
October 14, 2001

Miami Fusion	0–4	San Jose Earthquakes
		Donovan 16'; Russell 57'; Lagos 69'; De Rosario 89'

Spartan Stadium
San Jose, California
Attendance: 16,119
October 17, 2001

San Jose Earthquakes	1–0 (AET)	Miami Fusion
Dayak 94'

Lockhart Stadium
Fort Lauderdale, Florida
Attendance: 11,242

San Jose Earthquakes advance 6–3 on points.

=== MLS Cup ===
October 21, 2001

Los Angeles Galaxy	1–2 (AET)	San Jose Earthquakes
Hernández 21'		Donovan 43'; De Rosario 96'

Columbus Crew Stadium
Columbus, Ohio
Attendance: 21,626

== Player statistics ==
=== Goals ===
Rank	Player	Club	Goals
1	(Honduras) Alex Pineda Chacón	Miami Fusion	19
2	(Colombia) Diego Serna	Miami Fusion	15
3	(Scotland) John Spencer	Colorado Rapids	14
3	(Sierra Leone) Abdul Thompson Conteh	D.C. United	14
5	(El Salvador) Ronald Cerritos	San Jose Earthquakes	11
5	(Ecuador) Ariel Graziani	Dallas Burn	11
7	(United States) Jeff Cunningham	Columbus Crew	10
7	(United States) Eric Wynalda	New England Revolution, Chicago Fire	10
9	(Senegal) Mamadou Diallo	Tampa Bay Mutiny	9
9	(Bolivia) Jaime Moreno	D.C. United	9

=== Hat-tricks ===
Player	Club	Against	Result	Date
(United States) Clint Mathis	MetroStars	Kansas City Wizards	4–1	May 2
(Sierra Leone) Abdul Thompson Conteh	D.C. United	New England Revolution	5–0	May 9
(Senegal) Mamadou Diallo^{4}	Tampa Bay Mutiny	Los Angeles Galaxy	4–1	May 9
(Colombia) Diego Serna	Miami Fusion	Dallas Burn	6–2	June 2
(United States) Dante Washington	Columbus Crew	Tampa Bay Mutiny	6–1	June 16
(Scotland) John Spencer	Colorado Rapids	D.C. United	3–1	July 4
(Honduras) Alex Pineda Chacón	Miami Fusion	D.C. United	3–1	September 8

=== Assists ===
Rank	Player	Club	Assists
1	(Colombia) Diego Serna	Miami Fusion	11
1	(Colombia) John Wilmar Pérez	Columbus Crew	11
3	(United States) Ross Paule	Colorado Rapids	10
3	(United States) Preki	Miami Fusion	10
5	(United States) Jeff Cunningham	Columbus Crew	8
5	(United States) Cobi Jones	Los Angeles Galaxy	8
5	(United States) Manny Lagos	San Jose Earthquakes	8
5	(Poland) Piotr Nowak	Chicago Fire	8
9	(United States) Landon Donovan	San Jose Earthquakes	7
9	(Bolivia) Marco Etcheverry	D.C. United	7
9	(Ecuador) Ariel Graziani	Dallas Burn	7
9	(United States) Eric Quill	Tampa Bay Mutiny	7

=== Clean sheets ===
Rank	Player	Club	Clean sheets
1	(United States) Matt Jordan	Dallas Burn	9
1	(United States) Zach Thornton	Chicago Fire	9
3	(United States) Joe Cannon	San Jose Earthquakes	7
4	(United States) Matt Reis	Los Angeles Galaxy	6
5	(United States) Tom Presthus	Columbus Crew	5
5	(United States) Nick Rimando	Miami Fusion	5
7	(United States) Kevin Hartman	Los Angeles Galaxy	4
7	(United States) Tim Howard	MetroStars	4
7	(United States) Tony Meola	Kansas City Wizards	4
10	(United States) Bo Oshoniyi	Kansas City Wizards	3

== Awards ==
=== Individual awards ===
Award	Player	Club
Most Valuable Player	(Honduras) Alex Pineda Chacón	Miami Fusion
Defender of the Year	(United States) Jeff Agoos	San Jose Earthquakes
Goalkeeper of the Year	(United States) Tim Howard	MetroStars
Coach of the Year	(Canada) Frank Yallop	San Jose Earthquakes
Rookie of the Year	(Brazil) Rodrigo Faria	MetroStars
Comeback Player of the Year	(United States) Troy Dayak	San Jose Earthquakes
Scoring Champion	(Honduras) Alex Pineda Chacón	Miami Fusion
Goal of the Year	(United States) Clint Mathis	MetroStars
Fair Play Award	(Honduras) Alex Pineda Chacón	Miami Fusion
Humanitarian of the Year	(United States) Tim Howard	MetroStars

=== Best XI ===
Goalkeeper	Defenders	Midfielders	Forwards
(United States) Tim Howard, MetroStars	(United States) Jeff Agoos, San Jose (United States) Carlos Llamosa, Miami (United States) Pablo Mastroeni, Miami (United States) Greg Vanney, LA Galaxy	(United States) Chris Armas, Chicago (Poland) Piotr Nowak, Chicago (United States) Preki, Miami	(Honduras) Alex Pineda Chacón, Miami (Colombia) Diego Serna, Miami (Scotland) John Spencer, Colorado

=== Player of the Month ===
Week	Player	Club
April	(Honduras) Alex Pineda Chacón	Miami Fusion
May	(United States) Clint Mathis	MetroStars
June	(Colombia) Diego Serna	Miami Fusion
July	(Bulgaria) Hristo Stoitchkov	Chicago Fire
August	(United States) Brian Maisonneuve	Columbus Crew

== Attendance ==
Team	Games	Total	Average
D.C. United	12	258,213	21,518
MetroStars	13	270,477	20,806
Columbus Crew	13	227,644	17,511
Los Angeles Galaxy	13	226,035	17,387
Colorado Rapids	13	214,249	16,481
Chicago Fire	14	229,438	16,388
New England Revolution	13	203,501	15,654
Dallas Burn	13	163,465	12,574
Miami Fusion	14	156,481	11,177
Kansas City Wizards	13	142,402	10,954
Tampa Bay Mutiny	14	146,704	10,479
San Jose Earthquakes	13	125,250	9,635
Totals	158	2,363,859	14,961

== International Competition ==
CONCACAF Champions' Cup

- Kansas City Wizards
  2001 edition canceled; Wizards advanced to CONCACAF Champions' Cup 2002.
- Chicago Fire
  2001 edition canceled; Fire advance to CONCACAF Champions' Cup 2002.

Copa Merconorte

- MetroStars
  Went 3-3-0 in group stage and did not advance.
  Defeated (Venezuela) Deportivo Italchacao, 2-0 at home.
  Awarded two forfeit wins against
  (Mexico) Club Deportivo Guadalajara, after the club refused to travel.
  Lost (Venezuela) Deportivo Italchacao, 2-1 away.
  Lost (Colombia) Millonarios, 2-1 away and 1-0 at home.
- Kansas City Wizards
  Went 1-4-1 in group stage and did not advance.
  Defeated (Ecuador) Barcelona, 3-2 away, Drew 1-1 at home.
  Lost (Mexico) Santos Laguna, 4-2 away and 1-0 at home.
  Lost (Peru) Sporting Cristal, 2-1 at home and 2-1 away.

CONCACAF Giants Cup

- D.C. United
  Defeated (Jamaica) Arnett Gardens, 5-1 on aggregate in quarterfinals.
  Defeated (Guatemala) Comunicaciones, 2-1 in semifinals.
  Lost (Mexico) Club América, 2-0 in final.
- Columbus Crew
  Lost (Costa Rica) Deportivo Saprissa, 3-1 on aggregate in quarterfinals.
