= 2005 Major League Soccer season =

10th season of Major League Soccer

- Season: 2005
- Teams: 12
- MLS Cup: Los Angeles Galaxy (2nd title)
- Supporters' Shield: S.J. Earthquakes (1st shield)
- 2006 CONCACAF Champions' Cup: Los Angeles Galaxy; New England Revolution
- Matches: 192
- Goals: 551 (2.87 per match)
- Top goalscorer: Taylor Twellman; N.E. Revolution; Goals: 17
- Biggest home win: CHV 5–1 RSL; DCU 5–1 RSL
- Biggest away win: CLB 0–4 KCW
- Highest scoring: NY 5–4 NE
- Longest winning run: N.E. Revolution; Games: 6 (04/09 – 05/14); S.J. Earthquakes; Games: 6 (08/20 – 09/21)
- Longest unbeaten run: S.J. Earthquakes; Games: 14 (07/20/2005)
- Longest losing run: Real Salt Lake; Games: 10 (08/10 – 10/05)
- Highest attendance: Los Angeles Galaxy; Season: 387,256; Game Avg.: 24,204
- Lowest attendance: Kansas City Wizards; Season: 155,060; Game Avg.: 9,691
- Total attendance: 2,900,716
- Average attendance: 15,108

Locations of teams for the 2005 Major League Soccer season
Western Conference Eastern Conference

The 2005 Major League Soccer season was the tenth season of Major League Soccer. It was also the 93rd season of FIFA-sanctioned soccer in the United States, and the 27th with a national first-division league.

At MLS Cup 2004, two new expansion teams were announced to start play in 2005, Real Salt Lake and Chivas USA. Since both teams were assigned to the Western Conference, the Kansas City Wizards moved to the Eastern Conference to maintain regional balance.

The Dallas Burn re-branded as FC Dallas and moved to the league's newest soccer-specific stadium when Pizza Hut Park opened on August 6, 2005.

The league returned to a 32-game schedule which marked the most games played since the 2000 season.

The regular season began on April 2, and concluded on October 16. The 2005 MLS Cup Playoffs began on October 22, and concluded with MLS Cup 2005 on November 13. For the second time in four years, the Los Angeles Galaxy beat the New England Revolution to win MLS Cup before a sell-out crowd at Pizza Hut Park.

== Overview ==
=== Season format ===
The season began on April 2 and concluded with MLS Cup on November 13. The 12 teams were split evenly into two conferences. Each team played 32 games that were evenly divided between home and away. Each team played every other team in their conference four times, and every team in the opposite conference twice.

The top four teams from each conference qualified for the MLS Cup Playoffs. In the first round, aggregate goals over two matches determined the winners. The conference finals were played as a single match, and the winners advanced to MLS Cup. In all rounds, draws were broken with two 15-minute periods of extra time, followed by penalty kicks if necessary. The away goals rule was not used in any round.

The team with the most points in the regular season was awarded the MLS Supporters' Shield. Additionally, the winner of MLS Cup and the runner-up qualified for the CONCACAF Champions' Cup.

=== Stadiums and locations ===
Team	Stadium	Capacity
Chicago Fire	Soldier Field	61,500
Chivas USA	Home Depot Center	27,000
Colorado Rapids	Invesco Field at Mile High	76,125
Columbus Crew	Columbus Crew Stadium	22,555
D.C. United	RFK Stadium	46,000
FC Dallas	Cotton Bowl; Pizza Hut Park	92,100; 21,193
Kansas City Wizards	Arrowhead Stadium	81,425
Los Angeles Galaxy	Home Depot Center	27,000
MetroStars	Giants Stadium	80,200
New England Revolution	Gillette Stadium	68,756
Real Salt Lake	Rice-Eccles Stadium	45,017
San Jose Earthquakes	Spartan Stadium	30,456

=== Personnel and sponsorships ===
Team	Head coach	Captain	Shirt sponsor
Chicago Fire	(United States) Dave Sarachan		Honda
Chivas USA	(Netherlands) Hans Westerhof		—
Colorado Rapids	(United States) Fernando Clavijo		—
Columbus Crew	(Poland) Robert Warzycha	(United States) Robin Fraser	—
D.C. United	(Poland) Piotr Nowak		Sierra Mist
FC Dallas	(Northern Ireland) Colin Clarke		RadioShack
Kansas City Wizards	(United States) Bob Gansler		U.S. Soccer Foundation
Los Angeles Galaxy	(United States) Steve Sampson		Budweiser
MetroStars	(Scotland) Mo Johnston	(France) Youri Djorkaeff	—
New England Revolution	(Scotland) Steve Nicol		—
Real Salt Lake	(United States) John Ellinger	(United States) Jason Kreis	—
San Jose Earthquakes	(United States) Dominic Kinnear	(United States) Wade Barrett	—

=== Coaching changes ===
Team	Outgoing coach	Manner of departure	Date of vacancy	Incoming coach	Date of appointment
Chivas USA	(Netherlands) Thomas Rongen	Reassigned	May 30, 2005	(Mexico) Javier Ledesma	May 30, 2005
Chivas USA	(Mexico) Javier Ledesma	End of interim period	June 3, 2005	(Netherlands) Hans Westerhof	June 3, 2005
Columbus Crew	(United States) Greg Andrulis	Fired	July 16, 2005	(Poland) Robert Warzycha	July 16, 2005
MetroStars	(United States) Bob Bradley	Fired	October 4, 2005	(Scotland) Mo Johnston	October 4, 2005

== Standings ==
=== Eastern Conference ===
Pos	Team	Pld	W	L	T	GF	GA	GD	Pts	Qualification
1	New England Revolution	32	17	7	8	55	37	+18	59	MLS Cup Playoffs
2	D.C. United	32	16	10	6	58	37	+21	54	MLS Cup Playoffs
3	Chicago Fire	32	15	13	4	49	50	−1	49	MLS Cup Playoffs
4	MetroStars	32	12	9	11	53	49	+4	47	MLS Cup Playoffs
5	Kansas City Wizards	32	11	9	12	52	44	+8	45	
6	Columbus Crew	32	11	16	5	34	45	−11	38	

Source: MLS

=== Western Conference ===
Pos	Team	Pld	W	L	T	GF	GA	GD	Pts	Qualification
1	San Jose Earthquakes	32	18	4	10	53	31	+22	64	MLS Cup Playoffs
2	FC Dallas	32	13	10	9	52	44	+8	48	MLS Cup Playoffs
3	Colorado Rapids	32	13	13	6	40	37	+3	45	MLS Cup Playoffs
4	Los Angeles Galaxy	32	13	13	6	44	45	−1	45	MLS Cup Playoffs
5	Real Salt Lake	32	5	22	5	30	65	−35	20	
6	Chivas USA	32	4	22	6	31	67	−36	18	

Source: MLS

=== Overall standings ===
Pos	Team	Pld	W	L	T	GF	GA	GD	Pts	Qualification
1	San Jose Earthquakes (S)	32	18	4	10	53	31	+22	64	
2	New England Revolution	32	17	7	8	55	37	+18	59	Qualification for the CONCACAF Champions' Cup
3	D.C. United	32	16	10	6	58	37	+21	54	
4	Chicago Fire	32	15	13	4	49	50	−1	49	
5	Dallas Burn	32	13	10	9	52	44	+8	48	
6	MetroStars	32	12	9	11	53	49	+4	47	
7	Colorado Rapids	32	13	13	6	40	37	+3	45	
8	Los Angeles Galaxy (C)	32	13	13	6	44	45	−1	45	Qualification for the CONCACAF Champions' Cup
9	Kansas City Wizards	32	11	9	12	52	44	+8	45	
10	Columbus Crew	32	11	16	5	34	45	−11	38	
11	Real Salt Lake	32	5	22	5	30	65	−35	20	
12	Chivas USA	32	4	22	6	31	67	−36	18	

Source: MLS
Rules for classification: 1) points; 2) head-to-head record; 3) goal difference; 4) number of goals scored
(C) MLS Cup champions; (S) Supporters' Shield winners

== MLS Cup playoffs ==
=== Bracket ===
Conference semifinals
E1	New England	0	3
E4	MetroStars	1	1
Eastern Conference
E3	Chicago	0	4
E2	D.C. United	0	0
W1	San Jose	1	1
W4	Los Angeles	3	1
Western Conference
W3	Colorado	0	2(5)
W2	Dallas	0	2(4)

Conference finals
E1	New England	1
E3	Chicago	0
W4	Los Angeles	2
W3	Colorado	0

MLS Cup
E1	New England	0
W4	Los Angeles	1

=== Conference semifinals ===
October 22, 2005

New England Revolution	0–1	MetroStars
	Report	Guevara 34'

Giants Stadium
East Rutherford, New Jersey
Attendance: 10,003
Referee: Ricardo Valenzuela
October 29, 2005

MetroStars	1–3	New England Revolution
Djorkaeff 59'	Report	Cancela 68'; Noonan 73'; Smith 83'

Gillette Stadium
Foxborough, Massachusetts
Attendance: 9,581
Referee: Brian Hall

New England Revolution advance 3-2 on aggregate.

October 21, 2005

D.C. United	0–0	Chicago Fire
	Report

Soldier Field
Chicago, Illinois
Attendance: 11,493
Referee: Brian Hall
October 30, 2005

Chicago Fire	4–0	D.C. United
Stewart 10'; Guerrero 37', 45+5'; Marsch 67'	Report	Gómez (red card) 55'

RFK Stadium
Washington, D.C.
Attendance: 20,089
Referee: Kevin Stott

Chicago Fire advance 4-0 on aggregate.

October 23, 2005

San Jose Earthquakes	1–3	Los Angeles Galaxy
Clark 68'	Report	Gomez 13'; Donovan 39', 87'

Home Depot Center
Carson, California
Attendance: 17,466
Referee: Abiodun Okulaja
October 29, 2005

Los Angeles Galaxy	1–1	San Jose Earthquakes
Grabavoy 67'	Report	Ching 42'

Spartan Stadium
San Jose, California
Attendance: 17,824
Referee: Alex Prus

Los Angeles Galaxy advance 4-2 on aggregate.

October 22, 2005

FC Dallas	0–0	Colorado Rapids
	Report

INVESCO Field at Mile High
Denver, Colorado
Attendance: 9,625
Referee: Michael Kennedy
October 29, 2005

Colorado Rapids	2–2	FC Dallas
Cunningham 19'; Nkong (red card) 58'; Kotschau 106'	Report	Ruiz 67', 105'
Penalties
Mastroeni (penalty scored); Kirovski (penalty scored); Cunningham (penalty scored); Cooke (penalty scored); Philippe (penalty scored)	5–4	(penalty scored) Ruiz; (penalty scored) Núñez; (penalty scored) Pareja; (penalty scored) Vanney; (penalty missed) Miña

Pizza Hut Park
Frisco, Texas
Attendance: 10,104
Referee: Terry Vaughn

Colorado Rapids advance 5-4 on penalties (2-2 on aggregate).

=== Conference finals ===
November 5, 2005

Los Angeles Galaxy	2–0	Colorado Rapids
Donovan 28', 88'	Report

INVESCO Field at Mile High
Denver, Colorado
Attendance: 12,789
Referee: Brian Hall

November 6, 2005

Chicago Fire	0–1	New England Revolution
Herron (red card) 90+2'	Report	Dempsey 4'

Gillette Stadium
Foxborough, Massachusetts
Attendance: 18,118
Referee: Terry Vaughn

=== MLS Cup ===
November 13, 2005

New England Revolution	0–1 (a.e.t.)	Los Angeles Galaxy
	Report	Ramírez 105+1'

Pizza Hut Park
Frisco, Texas
Attendance: 21,193
Referee: Kevin Stott

== Player statistics ==
=== Goals ===
Rank	Player	Club	Goals
1	(United States) Taylor Twellman	New England Revolution	17
2	(Bolivia) Jaime Moreno	D.C. United	16
3	(United States) Jeff Cunningham	Colorado Rapids	12
3	(United States) Landon Donovan	Los Angeles Galaxy	12
5	(Argentina) Christian Gómez	D.C. United	11
5	(United States) Herculez Gomez	Los Angeles Galaxy	11
5	(Honduras) Amado Guevara	MetroStars	11
5	(Guatemala) Carlos Ruiz	FC Dallas	11
9	(United States) Clint Dempsey	New England Revolution	10
9	(France) Youri Djorkaeff	MetroStars	10
9	(United States) Josh Wolff	Kansas City Wizards	10

=== Assists ===
Rank	Player	Club	Assists
1	(United States) Josh Wolff	Kansas City Wizards	10
2	(United States) Landon Donovan	FC Dallas	9
3	(Republic of Ireland) Ronnie O'Brien	Colorado Rapids	8
4	(Argentina) Christian Gómez	D.C. United	7
4	(Honduras) Amado Guevara	MetroStars	7
4	(Canada) Dwayne De Rosario	San Jose Earthquakes	7
4	(El Salvador) Ronald Cerritos	San Jose Earthquakes	7
4	(United States) Brad Davis	San Jose Earthquakes	7
9	(United States) Chris Rolfe	Chicago Fire	6
10	16 players		5

=== Clean sheets ===
Rank	Player	Club	Clean sheets
1	(Canada) Pat Onstad	San Jose Earthquakes	12
2	(United States) Nick Rimando	D.C. United	11
3	(United States) Matt Reis	New England Revolution	10
4	(United States) Joe Cannon	Colorado Rapids	8
5	(United States) Bo Oshoniyi	Kansas City Wizards	7
6	(United States) Scott Garlick	FC Dallas	6
6	(United States) Kevin Hartman	Los Angeles Galaxy	6
6	(United States) Zach Thornton	Chicago Fire	6
9	(United States) Jonny Walker	Columbus Crew	5
10	(United States) D.J. Countess	Real Salt Lake	4
10	(United States) Zach Wells	MetroStars	4

== Awards ==
=== Individual awards ===
Award	Player	Club
Most Valuable Player	(United States) Taylor Twellman	New England Revolution
Defender of the Year	(United States) Jimmy Conrad	Kansas City Wizards
Goalkeeper of the Year	(Canada) Pat Onstad	San Jose Earthquakes
Coach of the Year	(United States) Dominic Kinnear	San Jose Earthquakes
Rookie of the Year	(United States) Michael Parkhurst	New England Revolution
Comeback Player of the Year	(United States) Chris Klein	Kansas City Wizards
Golden Boot	(United States) Taylor Twellman	New England Revolution
Goal of the Year	(Canada) Dwayne De Rosario	San Jose Earthquakes
Fair Play Award	(El Salvador) Ronald Cerritos	San Jose Earthquakes
Humanitarian of the Year	(United States) Brian Kamler	Real Salt Lake

=== Best XI ===
Goalkeeper	Defenders	Midfielders	Forwards
(Canada) Pat Onstad, San Jose	(United States) Chris Albright, LA Galaxy (United States) Danny Califf, San Jose (United States) Jimmy Conrad, Kansas City	(United States) Clint Dempsey, New England (Canada) Dwayne De Rosario, San Jose (Argentina) Christian Gómez, D.C. United (Grenada) Shalrie Joseph, New England (Republic of Ireland) Ronnie O'Brien, Dallas	(Bolivia) Jaime Moreno, D.C. United (United States) Taylor Twellman, New England

== Attendance ==
Club	Games	Total	Average
Los Angeles Galaxy	16	387,256	24,204
Real Salt Lake	16	288,586	18,037
Chicago Fire	16	275,811	17,238
Chivas USA	16	273,284	17,080
D.C. United	16	266,617	16,664
MetroStars	16	241,230	15,077
Colorado Rapids	16	218,206	13,638
San Jose Earthquakes	16	208,594	13,037
Columbus Crew	16	206,654	12,916
New England Revolution	16	200,397	12,525
FC Dallas	16	179,021	11,189
Kansas City Wizards	16	155,060	9,691
Totals	192	2,900,716	15,108
