= MLS Fair Play Award =

The Fair Play Award in Major League Soccer was the award that was given to an individual player and a team who presented best overall sportsmanlike behavior in addition to receiving one of the lowest numbers of yellow and red cards, fouls and disciplinary violations.

== Individual winners ==
Season	Player	Team
1997	(United States) Mark Chung	Kansas City Wizards
1998	(United States) Thomas Dooley	Columbus Crew
1999	(United States) Steve Ralston	Tampa Bay Mutiny
2000	(United States) Steve Ralston (2)	Tampa Bay Mutiny
2001	(Honduras) Alex Pineda Chacón	Miami Fusion
2002	(United States) Mark Chung (2)	Colorado Rapids
2003	(United States) Brian McBride	Columbus Crew
2004	(United States) Eddie Pope	MetroStars
2005	(El Salvador) Ronald Cerritos	San Jose Earthquakes
2006	(United States) Chris Klein	Real Salt Lake
2007	(United States) Michael Parkhurst	New England Revolution
2008	(United States) Michael Parkhurst (2)	New England Revolution
2009	(United States) Steve Ralston (3)	New England Revolution
2010	(France) Sébastien Le Toux	Philadelphia Union
2011	(France) Sébastien Le Toux (2)	Philadelphia Union
2012	(United States) Logan Pause	Chicago Fire
2013	(United States) Darlington Nagbe	Portland Timbers
2014	(United States) Michael Parkhurst (3)	Columbus Crew
2015	(United States) Darlington Nagbe (2)	Portland Timbers
2016	(United States) Keegan Rosenberry	Philadelphia Union
2017	(United States) DaMarcus Beasley	Houston Dynamo
2018	(Georgia (country)) Valeri Qazaishvili	San Jose Earthquakes
2019	(United States) Darlington Nagbe (3)	Atlanta United FC
2020	Not awarded	
2021	(United States) Dave Romney	Nashville SC

== Team winners ==
Season	Team	Manager
1997	(United States) Columbus Crew	Tom Fitzgerald
1998	(United States) Kansas City Wizards	Ron Newman
1999	(United States) Columbus Crew (2)	Tom Fitzgerald
2000	(United States) Tampa Bay Mutiny	Tim Hankinson
2001	(United States) San Jose Earthquakes	Frank Yallop
2002	(United States) Kansas City Wizards (2)	Bob Gansler
2003	(United States) New England Revolution	Steve Nicol
2004	(United States) Columbus Crew (3)	Greg Andrulis
2005	(United States) Kansas City Wizards (3)	Bob Gansler
2006	(United States) Kansas City Wizards (4)	Curt Onalfo
2007	(United States) Columbus Crew (4)	Sigi Schmid
2008	(United States) New England Revolution (2)	Steve Nicol
2009	(United States) Chicago Fire	Denis Hamlett
2010	(United States) San Jose Earthquakes (2)	Frank Yallop
2011	(United States) Portland Timbers	John Spencer
2012	(United States) New England Revolution (3)	Jay Heaps
2013	(United States) LA Galaxy	Bruce Arena
2014	(United States) Philadelphia Union	Jim Curtin
2015	(United States) Philadelphia Union (2)	Jim Curtin
2016	(United States) Columbus Crew (5)	Gregg Berhalter
2017	(United States) Seattle Sounders FC	Brian Schmetzer
2018	(United States) Los Angeles FC	Bob Bradley
2019	(Canada) Toronto FC	Greg Vanney
2020	Not awarded	
2021	(United States) Columbus Crew (6)	Caleb Porter
2022	(United States) New England Revolution (4)	Bruce Arena
