= 2002 Major League Soccer season =

7th season of Major League Soccer

- Season: 2002
- Teams: 10
- MLS Cup: Los Angeles Galaxy (1st title)
- Supporters' Shield: Los Angeles Galaxy (2nd shield)
- 2003 CONCACAF Champions' Cup: Los Angeles Galaxy; New England Revolution; San Jose Earthquakes
- Matches: 140
- Goals: 421 (3.01 per match)
- Top goalscorer: Carlos Ruiz; Los Angeles Galaxy; Goals: 24
- Highest attendance: Colorado Rapids; Season: 289,663; Game Avg.: 20,690
- Lowest attendance: San Jose Earthquakes; Season: 156,104; Game Avg.: 11,150
- Total attendance: 2,215,019
- Average attendance: 15,822

Locations of teams for the 2002 Major League Soccer season
Western Conference Eastern Conference

The 2002 Major League Soccer season was the seventh season of Major League Soccer. It was also the 90th season of FIFA-sanctioned soccer in the United States, and the 24th with a national first-division league.

According to FC Dallas president Dan Hunt, the entire league nearly folded during the 2001 offseason. The owners agreed to shut down the league on a conference call in November 2001, but within two days Lamar Hunt convinced the other owners to give the league another year.

On January 8, 2002, the league folded two of its teams, both of which were in Florida. The Miami Fusion ceased operations after only four years of existence due to low attendance and an unfavorable stadium deal. The Tampa Bay Mutiny also ceased operations due to the lack of local ownership. With the league reduced to ten teams, the Central Division was eliminated and the league returned to the original two-conference alignment.

Two new stadiums opened this season. The Colorado Rapids moved into Invesco Field at Mile High and the New England Revolution moved into CMGI Field, which was renamed Gillette Stadium on August 5. Additionally, due to renovations at Soldier Field, the Chicago Fire played at Cardinal Stadium in the western suburb of Naperville.

In an effort to lower costs, the number of games was reduced from 32 to 28, marking the fewest games played in league history. The playoffs were also reformatted as the teams with the 8 highest point totals qualified regardless of conference affiliation.

The regular season began on March 23, and concluded on September 22. The 2002 MLS Cup Playoffs began on September 25, and concluded with MLS Cup 2002 on October 20. After three previous losses in the final, the Los Angeles Galaxy won their first MLS Cup with a victory over the New England Revolution.

== Overview ==
=== Season format ===
The season began on March 23 and concluded with MLS Cup on October 20. The 10 teams were split evenly into two conferences. Each team played 28 games that were evenly divided between home and away. Each team played every other team in their conference, and one designated opponent from the opposite conference, four times, and the remaining teams in the opposite conference twice.

The top eight teams regardless of conference qualified for the MLS Cup Playoffs. The first round and conference finals were played as a three game series, and the first team to 5 points advanced. The winners of the conference finals advanced to MLS Cup.

The team with the most points in the regular season was awarded the MLS Supporters' Shield. Additionally, the winner of MLS Cup and the runner-up qualified for the CONCACAF Champions' Cup.

=== Stadiums and locations ===
Team	Stadium	Capacity
Chicago Fire	Cardinal Stadium	15,000
Colorado Rapids	Invesco Field at Mile High	76,125
Columbus Crew	Columbus Crew Stadium	22,555
D.C. United	RFK Stadium	46,000
Dallas Burn	Cotton Bowl	92,100
Kansas City Wizards	Arrowhead Stadium	81,425
Los Angeles Galaxy	Rose Bowl	92,542
MetroStars	Giants Stadium	80,200
New England Revolution	CMGI Field	68,756
San Jose Earthquakes	Spartan Stadium	30,456

=== Personnel and sponsorships ===
Team	Head coach	Captain	Shirt sponsor
Chicago Fire	(United States) Bob Bradley		—
Colorado Rapids	(United States) Tim Hankinson		
Columbus Crew	(United States) Greg Andrulis		Pepsi
D.C. United	(England) Ray Hudson		—
Dallas Burn	(United States) Mike Jeffries		
Kansas City Wizards	(United States) Bob Gansler		—
Los Angeles Galaxy	(United States) Sigi Schmid		—
MetroStars	(Ecuador) Octavio Zambrano	(United States) Tab Ramos	—
New England Revolution	(Scotland) Steve Nicol		—
San Jose Earthquakes	(Canada) Frank Yallop	(United States) Jeff Agoos	Yahoo! Sports

=== Coaching changes ===
Team	Outgoing coach	Manner of departure	Date of vacancy	Incoming coach	Date of appointment
New England Revolution	(United States) Fernando Clavijo	Fired	May 23, 2002	(Scotland) Steve Nicol	May 23, 2002

== Standings ==
=== Eastern Conference ===
Pos	Team	Pld	W	L	T	GF	GA	GD	Pts	Qualification
1	New England Revolution	28	12	14	2	49	49	0	38	Qualification for the quarterfinals
2	Columbus Crew	28	11	12	5	44	43	+1	38	Qualification for the quarterfinals
3	Chicago Fire	28	11	13	4	43	38	+5	37	Qualification for the quarterfinals
4	MetroStars	28	11	15	2	41	47	−6	35	
5	D.C. United	28	9	14	5	31	40	−9	32	

Source: MLS

=== Western Conference ===
Pos	Team	Pld	W	L	T	GF	GA	GD	Pts	Qualification
1	Los Angeles Galaxy	28	16	9	3	44	33	+11	51	Qualification for the quarterfinals
2	San Jose Earthquakes	28	14	11	3	45	35	+10	45	Qualification for the quarterfinals
3	Dallas Burn	28	12	9	7	44	43	+1	43	Qualification for the quarterfinals
4	Colorado Rapids	28	13	11	4	43	48	−5	43	Qualification for the quarterfinals
5	Kansas City Wizards	28	9	10	9	37	45	−8	36	Qualification for the quarterfinals

Source: MLS

=== Overall standings ===
Pos	Team	Pld	W	L	T	GF	GA	GD	Pts	Qualification
1	Los Angeles Galaxy (C, S)	28	16	9	3	44	33	+11	51	Qualification for the CONCACAF Champions' Cup
2	San Jose Earthquakes	28	14	11	3	45	35	+10	45	Qualification for the CONCACAF Champions' Cup
3	Dallas Burn	28	12	9	7	44	43	+1	43	
4	Colorado Rapids	28	13	11	4	43	48	−5	43	
5	New England Revolution	28	12	14	2	49	49	0	38	Qualification for the CONCACAF Champions' Cup
6	Columbus Crew (U)	28	11	12	5	44	43	+1	38	Qualification for the CONCACAF Champions' Cup
7	Chicago Fire	28	11	13	4	43	38	+5	37	
8	Kansas City Wizards	28	9	10	9	37	45	−8	36	
9	MetroStars	28	11	15	2	41	47	−6	35	
10	D.C. United	28	9	14	5	31	40	−9	32	

Source: MLS
Rules for classification: 1) points; 2) head-to-head record; 3) goal difference; 4) number of goals scored
(C) MLS Cup champions; (S) Supporters' Shield winners; (U) U.S. Open Cup winners

== MLS Cup playoffs ==
=== Bracket ===
Quarterfinals
1	Los Angeles Galaxy (ASDET)* (6 Points)	3*	1	5
8	Kansas City Wizards (3 Points)	2	4	2
4	Dallas Burn (4 Points)	4	0	1
5	Colorado Rapids (SDET)** (4 Points)	2	1	1**
2	New England Revolution (6 Points)	2	1	2
7	Chicago Fire (3 Points)	0	2	0
3	San Jose Earthquakes (0 Points)	1	1	x
6	Columbus Crew (6 Points)	2	2	x

Semifinals
1	Los Angeles Galaxy (6 Points)	4	1	x
5	Colorado Rapids (0 Points)	0	0	x
2	New England Revolution (5 Points)	0	1	2
6	Columbus Crew (2 Points)	0	0	2

MLS Cup
1	Los Angeles Galaxy (ASDET)*	1
2	New England Revolution	0

- Points system
  Win = 3 Pts.
  Loss = 0 Pts.
  Draw = 1 Pt.
- ASDET*=Added sudden death extra time (game tie breaker)
  SDET**=Sudden death extra time (series tie breaker)
  Teams will advance at 5 points.

=== Quarterfinals ===
September 25, 2002

Kansas City Wizards	2–3 (a.e.t.)	Los Angeles Galaxy
Preki 25'; Brown 70'		Ruiz 62' (pen.) 99'; Jones 85'

Rose Bowl
Pasadena, California
Attendance: 14,585
September 28, 2002

Los Angeles Galaxy	1–4	Kansas City Wizards
Albright 71'		Simutenkov 19'; Quill 37'; Preki 70'; Fabbro 73'

Arrowhead Stadium
Kansas City, Missouri
Attendance: 9,484
October 2, 2002

Kansas City Wizards	2–5	Los Angeles Galaxy
Klein 47'; Preki 72'		Ruiz 34' 66'; Jones 45'+, 62'; Tennyson 90+3'

Rose Bowl
Pasadena, California
Attendance: 14,713
- Los Angeles Galaxy advance 6-3 on points.

September 26, 2002

Chicago Fire	0–2	New England Revolution
		Twellman 13'; Hernández 60'

Gillette Stadium
Foxborough, Massachusetts
Attendance: 6,306
September 29, 2002

New England Revolution	1–2	Chicago Fire
Kamler 28'		Razov 43' (pen.), 76'

Cardinal Stadium
Naperville, Illinois
Attendance: 9,434
October 2, 2002

Chicago Fire	0–2	New England Revolution
		Kamler 12'; Twellman 65'

Gillette Stadium
Foxborough, Massachusetts
Attendance: 6,954
- New England Revolution advance 6–3 on points.

September 26, 2002

Columbus Crew	2–1	San Jose Earthquakes
Buddle 38'; García 81'		Donovan 54'

Spartan Stadium
San Jose, California
Attendance: 8,069
September 28, 2002

San Jose Earthquakes	1–2	Columbus Crew
Graziani 58'		García 50'; McBride 81'

Columbus Crew Stadium
Columbus, Ohio
Attendance: 13,004
- Columbus Crew advance 6–0 on points.

September 25, 2002

Colorado Rapids	2–4	Dallas Burn
Valderrama 2'; Spencer (Pen) 75'		Morrow 26'; Kreis 49'; Deering 68'; Martínez 70'

Cotton Bowl
Dallas, Texas
Attendance: 6,360
September 28, 2002

Dallas Burn	0–1	Colorado Rapids
		Carrieri 78'

INVESCO Field at Mile High
Denver, Colorado
Attendance: 9,637
October 2, 2002

Colorado Rapids	1–1	Dallas Burn
Spencer 22'		Rhine 6'

Cotton Bowl
Dallas, Texas
Attendance: 8,008

	1–0 series OT (a.s.d.e.t.)
Chung 1'

- Colorado Rapids advance in series (sudden death) overtime, after 4–4 tie on points.

=== Semifinals ===
October 5, 2002

Colorado Rapids	0–4	Los Angeles Galaxy
		Califf 21'; Ruiz 24' 84'; Hendrickson 71'

Rose Bowl
Pasadena, California
Attendance: 24,742
October 9, 2002

Los Angeles Galaxy	1–0	Colorado Rapids
Ruiz 64'

INVESCO Field at Mile High
Denver, Colorado
Attendance: 12,367
- Los Angeles Galaxy advance 6–0 on points.

October 6, 2002

Columbus Crew	0–0	New England Revolution

Gillette Stadium
Foxborough, Massachusetts
Attendance: 11,387
October 9, 2002

New England Revolution	1–0	Columbus Crew
Heaps 3'

Columbus Crew Stadium
Columbus, Ohio
Attendance: 10,245
October 12, 2002

Columbus Crew	2–2	New England Revolution
McBride 80'; Washington 85'		Ralston 17'; Harris 47'

Gillette Stadium
Foxborough, Massachusetts
Attendance: 9,216
- New England Revolution advance 5–2 on points.

=== MLS Cup ===
October 20, 2002

Los Angeles Galaxy	1–0 (2OT)	New England Revolution
Ruiz 113'	Report

Gillette Stadium
Foxborough, Massachusetts
Attendance: 61,316
Referee: Kevin Terry

== Player statistics ==
=== Goals ===
Rank	Player	Club	Goals
1	(Guatemala) Carlos Ruiz	Los Angeles Galaxy	24
2	(United States) Taylor Twellman	New England Revolution	23
3	(United States) Jeff Cunningham	Columbus Crew	16
4	(United States) Ante Razov	Chicago Fire	14
4	(Ecuador) Ariel Graziani	San Jose Earthquakes	14
6	(United States) Jason Kreis	Dallas Burn	13
7	(Senegal) Mamadou Diallo	New England Revolution, MetroStars	12
7	(Brazil) Rodrigo Faria	MetroStars	12
9	(United States) Chris Carrieri	Colorado Rapids	11
9	(United States) Mark Chung	Colorado Rapids	11
9	(United States) Chris Henderson	Colorado Rapids	11

=== Hat-tricks ===
Player	Club	Against	Result	Date
(United States) Ante Razov	Chicago Fire	New England Revolution	3–1	May 19
(United States) Bobby Rhine	Dallas Burn	Colorado Rapids	4–1	June 8
(Senegal) Mamadou Diallo^{4}	MetroStars	Los Angeles Galaxy	5–0	June 15
(United States) Chris Carrieri	Colorado Rapids	Chicago Fire	3–2	July 4
(Guatemala) Carlos Ruiz	Los Angeles Galaxy	MetroStars	3–0	August 31
(United States) Taylor Twellman	New England Revolution	D.C. United	2–0	September 2

=== Assists ===
Rank	Player	Club	Assists
1	(Jamaica) Andy Williams	MetroStars	13
2	(United States) Steve Ralston	New England Revolution	12
3	(United States) Preki	Kansas City Wizards	8
4	(United States) Mark Chung	Colorado Rapids	7
4	(United States) Cobi Jones	Los Angeles Galaxy	7
4	(Mexico) Antonio Martínez	Dallas Burn	7
4	(Colombia) Carlos Valderrama	Colorado Rapids	7
8	(United States) Ramiro Corrales	San Jose Earthquakes	6
8	(Canada) Dwayne De Rosario	San Jose Earthquakes	6
8	(New Zealand) Simon Elliott	Los Angeles Galaxy	6
8	(United States) Bobby Rhine	Dallas Burn	6
8	(Bolivia) Joselito Vaca	Dallas Burn	6

=== Clean sheets ===
Rank	Player	Club	Clean sheets
1	(United States) Joe Cannon	San Jose Earthquakes	8
2	(United States) Nick Rimando	D.C. United	7
2	(United States) Zach Thornton	Chicago Fire	7
4	(United States) Adin Brown	New England Revolution	5
4	(United States) Jon Busch	Columbus Crew	5
4	(United States) Kevin Hartman	Los Angeles Galaxy	5
7	(United States) Scott Garlick	Colorado Rapids	4
7	(United States) Tim Howard	MetroStars	4
9	(United States) Matt Jordan	Dallas Burn	3
9	(United States) Tony Meola	Kansas City Wizards	3

== Awards ==
=== Individual awards ===
Award	Player	Club
Most Valuable Player	(Guatemala) Carlos Ruiz	Los Angeles Galaxy
Defender of the Year	(United States) Carlos Bocanegra	Chicago Fire
Goalkeeper of the Year	(United States) Joe Cannon	San Jose Earthquakes
Coach of the Year	(Scotland) Steve Nicol	New England Revolution
Rookie of the Year	(United States) Kyle Martino	Columbus Crew
Comeback Player of the Year	(United States) Chris Klein	Kansas City Wizards
Scoring Champion	(United States) Taylor Twellman	New England Revolution
Goal of the Year	(Guatemala) Carlos Ruiz	Los Angeles Galaxy
Fair Play Award	(United States) Mark Chung	Colorado Rapids
Humanitarian of the Year	(United States) Steve Jolley	MetroStars

=== Best XI ===
Goalkeeper	Defenders	Midfielders	Forwards
(United States) Tim Howard, MetroStars	(United States) Wade Barrett, San Jose (United States) Carlos Bocanegra, Chicago (United States) Alexi Lalas, LA Galaxy	(United States) Mark Chung, Colorado (Denmark) Ronnie Ekelund, San Jose (Colombia) Óscar Pareja, Dallas (United States) Steve Ralston, New England	(United States) Jeff Cunningham, Columbus (Guatemala) Carlos Ruiz, LA Galaxy (United States) Taylor Twellman, New England

== Attendance ==
Club	Games	Total	Average
Colorado Rapids	14	289,663	20,690
Los Angeles Galaxy	14	266,664	19,047
MetroStars	14	254,174	18,155
Columbus Crew	14	243,999	17,429
New England Revolution	14	236,973	16,927
D.C. United	14	231,264	16,519
Dallas Burn	14	183,702	13,122
Chicago Fire	14	180,908	12,922
Kansas City Wizards	14	171,568	12,255
San Jose Earthquakes	14	156,104	11,150
Totals	140	2,215,019	15,822
