= Brian Maisonneuve =

American soccer player (born 1973)

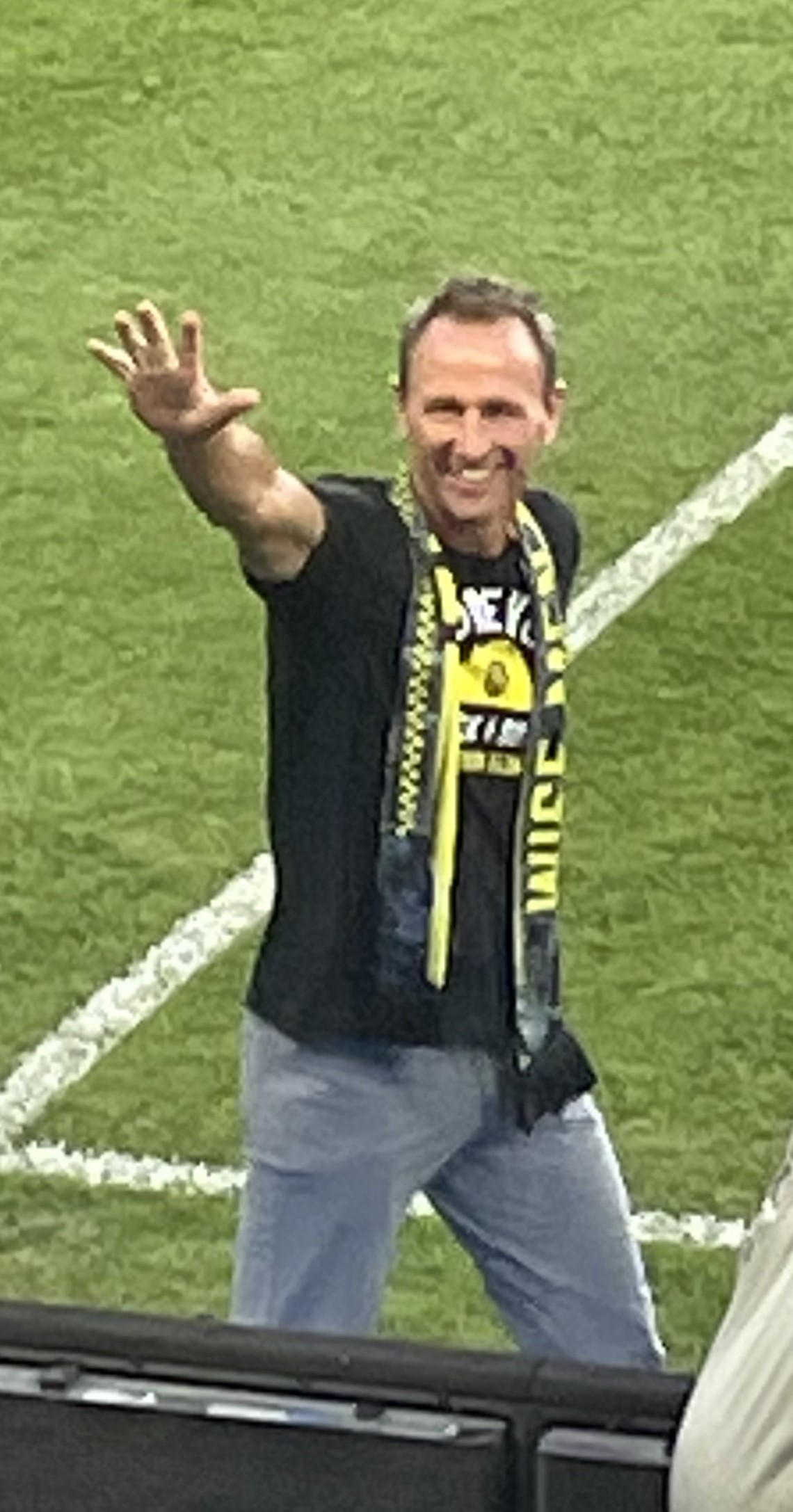
- Maisonneuve in 2022

Personal information
- Date of birth: June 28, 1973 (age 53)
- Place of birth: Warren, Michigan, United States
- Height: 5 ft 11 in (1.80 m)
- Position: Midfielder

Youth career
- 1983–1989: Carpathia Kickers

College career
| Years | Team | Apps | (Gls) |
| 1990–1994 | Indiana Hoosiers | | |

Senior career*
| Years | Team | Apps | (Gls) |
| 1996–2004 | Columbus Crew | 172 | (23) |

International career
| 1997–2002 | United States | 13 | (0) |

Managerial career
- 2005–2008: United States U-17 (assistant)
- 2008–2010: Louisville Cardinals (assistant)
- 2010–2017: Indiana Hoosiers (assistant)
- 2018–: Ohio State Buckeyes
Medal record
Representing United States
| Winner | CONCACAF Gold Cup | 2002 |
Men's Soccer
- * Club domestic league appearances and goals

Brian Maisonneuve (born June 28, 1973) is an American retired soccer player and current coach of the Ohio State Buckeyes. He spent his entire professional career as a defensive midfielder with the Columbus Crew of Major League Soccer. He was a member of the U.S. soccer teams at both the 1996 Summer Olympics and the 1998 FIFA World Cup, earning a total of thirteen caps with the U.S. national team.

== Youth and college ==
Maisonneuve was born in Warren, Michigan. He played for the Carpathia Kickers in Metro Detroit as a child and teen. He played his high school soccer at De La Salle Collegiate High School of Warren, Michigan. He played college soccer at Indiana University from 1991 to 1994, winning the Hermann Trophy his senior season, as well as finishing his career as the Big Ten's all-time top goalscorer with 44, and helping Indiana to the NCAA Championship game, losing 1–2 to Virginia.

== Club career ==
Maisonneuve was allocated to the Columbus Crew for the 1996 MLS season, becoming one of two players without any pro experience on the league's initial allocation list; the other was Damian Silvera. He scored the first hat-trick in Columbus Crew history in a match versus the Kansas City Wiz. Maisonneuve would quickly earn a starting spot with the Crew, and would hold on to it for the next 8 years. He started 83 games for the Crew between 1996 and 1999.

Before the 2000 season, he suffered a series of devastating ankle injuries, forcing him to sit out the season and threatening his career. Maisonneuve returned in 2001, however, and slotted right back into his starting role, scoring a career-high eight goals in that season. He would remain there for the next three years, before finally losing his spot when the Crew acquired Simon Elliott prior to the 2004 season; Maisonneuve would go on to play only nine games in 2004.

By Major League Soccer's ninth year, Maisonneuve was one of only two players to have played for a single club throughout that period, and when he retired after the season, he left Cobi Jones as the lone player with that distinction. Maisonneuve scored 25 goals and 41 assists across all competitions for the Columbus Crew.

== International career ==
After graduating from Indiana University, Maisonneuve spent 1995 training with the U.S. Olympic Team; he later played in the 1996 Summer Olympics. During his professional career, Maisonneuve was a fringe player for the United States national team, totaling just 13 caps with the team. Despite his limited playing time, Maisonneuve did play all three of the United States' games at the 1998 FIFA World Cup in France.

== Coaching career ==
Following his retirement in 2004, Maisonneuve joined the United States U-17 team as an assistant coach, spending four years there. In 2008, he joined the Louisville Cardinals men's soccer team coaching staff as an assistant coach. He would stay with the team for two years, during which time they had a 24–11–4 record. In 2010 Maisonneuve joined the Indiana Hoosiers men's soccer team coaching staff as an assistant coach. During his tenure, he helped the team to an NCAA Division I Championship in 2012, a regular season championship in 2010, a Big Ten Tournament Championship in 2013, and an overall record of 102–42–34. On April 23, 2018, Maisonneuve was announced as the head coach of the Ohio State Buckeyes men's soccer team.

== Style of play ==
Described as a "versatile midfielder," Maisonneuve has been noted for his passing, teamwork, and slide-tackling ability.

== Career statistics ==
Appearances and goals by club, season and competition
| Club | Season | League | | | Open Cup | | North America | | Total | |
| Club | Season | Division | Apps | Goals | Apps | Goals | Apps | Goals | Apps | Goals |
|---|---|---|---|---|---|---|---|---|---|---|
| Columbus Crew | 1996 | Major League Soccer | 15 | 5 | | | – | – | | |
| Columbus Crew | 1997 | Major League Soccer | 32 | 3 | | | – | – | | |
| Columbus Crew | 1998 | Major League Soccer | 13 | 3 | | | – | – | | |
| Columbus Crew | 1999 | Major League Soccer | 29 | 2 | | | – | – | | |
| Columbus Crew | 2000 | Major League Soccer | 0 | 0 | | | – | – | | |
| Columbus Crew | 2001 | Major League Soccer | 25 | 8 | | | – | – | | |
| Columbus Crew | 2002 | Major League Soccer | 26 | 1 | | | – | – | | |
| Columbus Crew | 2003 | Major League Soccer | 23 | 1 | | | | | | |
| Columbus Crew | 2004 | Major League Soccer | 9 | 5 | | | – | – | | |
| Career total | | | 172 | 23 | | | | | | |

== Honors ==
Columbus Crew

- Lamar Hunt U.S. Open Cup: 2002
- MLS Supporters' Shield: 2004

Ohio State

- Big Ten regular season champion: 2024
- Big Ten tournament champion: 2024

Individual

- Hermann Trophy: 1994
- MLS All-Star: 1999, 2002
- Big Ten Coach of the Year
- 2024 United Soccer Coaches College Coach of the Year
