= Chris Carrieri =

American soccer player (born 1980)

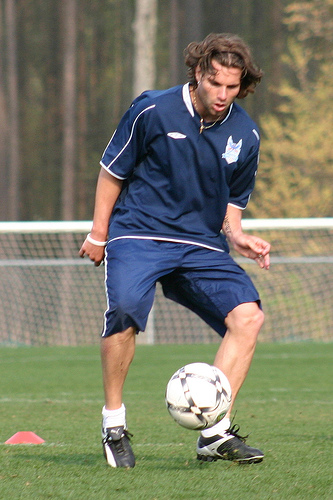

Personal information
- Full name: Christopher Michael Carrieri
- Date of birth: April 28, 1980 (age 46)
- Place of birth: San Antonio, Texas, United States
- Height: 5 ft 6 in (1.68 m)
- Position: Forward

College career
Years	Team	Apps	(Gls)
1998–2000	North Carolina Tar Heels	63	(50)

Senior career*
Years	Team	Apps	(Gls)
2000	New Brunswick Brigade	2	(3)
2001	San Jose Earthquakes	5	(0)
2001–2003	Colorado Rapids	84	(20)
2004	Rochester Raging Rhinos	27	(8)
2004	Chicago Fire	1	(0)
2005–2006	Richmond Kickers	52	(7)
2007	Carolina RailHawks	28	(0)
2009–2010	Richmond Kickers	7	(1)
- * Club domestic league appearances and goals

Chris Carrieri (born April 28, 1980) is an American former professional soccer player who played as a forward. He played college soccer for the North Carolina Tar Heels, where he was named ACC Rookie of the Year and earned All-America honors. As a junior, he led the nation with 25 goals. He was selected first overall by the San Jose Earthquakes in the 2001 MLS SuperDraft and was traded during his rookie season to the Colorado Rapids, where he played through 2003.

Carrieri later played for the Rochester Raging Rhinos, Richmond Kickers, and Carolina RailHawks. With Richmond, he won the USL Second Division championship in 2006, scoring the championship-winning goal, and returned to the club in 2009 to win a second league title.

== Career ==
=== College ===
Carrieri was born in San Antonio, Texas. After a successful high school career at North Stafford High School in Stafford, Virginia, Carrieri played college soccer at the University of North Carolina, where he was hugely successful. In his rookie year, he scored 13 goals and 3 assists, and was named the ACC Rookie of the Year. He did just as well his second year, finishing with 12 goals and 5 assists, and was named a third team NCAA All-American. In his junior season, he led the nation by scoring 25 goals, and added an astonishing 14 assists, and was named an NCAA first-team All-American. He also played club soccer for the Prince William Cardinals.

=== Professional ===
In 2000, Carrieri played two games, scoring three goals, with the New Brunswick Brigade in the Premier Development League. Following his junior season, Carrieri signed a Project-40 contract with MLS. He was drafted first overall in the 2001 MLS SuperDraft by the San Jose Earthquakes, and immediately vowed to lead the team to a championship. Although the Earthquakes won the MLS Cup that year, Carrieri was not there to see it - shortly into the season he was traded to the Colorado Rapids for Junior Agogo. Carrieri had a relatively impressive rookie campaign with the Rapids, registering 5 goals and 4 assists in only 14 games with the team. In his second year with the team, Carrieri established his reputation as a quality American forward in scoring 12 goals and 5 assists for the Rapids, including a remarkable 2nd half hat trick on July 4 (the second in club history) in front of 61,213 fans at Invesco Field at Mile High. In his third year, Carrieri's production slowed, partially because of a contested (and temporary) move to right midfield, and he finished the year with 3 goals and 8 assists. Following the season, Carrieri was not re-signed by the Rapids, apparently partially because of conflicts with the coach Tim Hankinson, and partially because of salary cap concerns.

Carrieri signed before the 2004 season with the Rochester Raging Rhinos of the A-League. He had a solid season with the team, finishing the year with 8 goals and 8 assists in 27 games. After the end of the season, he played one game with the Chicago Fire, after being called up as an injury replacement. Carrieri also briefly played indoor for the Chicago Storm of the MISL. In 2005, with coach Tim Hankinson no longer at the helm, the Rapids brought back Carrieri for tryouts, but did not offer him a contract after pre-season. He then signed with Richmond Kickers of the then A-League. In 2006, Richmond went down to USL-2. Still under contract with the Kickers, Carrieri stayed with the newly demoted club and helped lead them to the 2006 USL Second Division Championship, where he scored the championship winning goal for the Kickers. In 2007, he became one of the first players to sign with the expansion USL First Division club Carolina RailHawks. He played in twenty-eight games, most as a starter, before announcing his retirement from professional soccer on March 18, 2008.

After spending 2008 coaching with the Capital Area Soccer League in Raleigh, North Carolina, Carrieri was coaxed out of retirement in 2009 by the Richmond Kickers, and he subsequently played 5 games and scored 1 goal for the team on the way to winning the 2009 USL2 championship. On January 14, 2010, Richmond announced the re-signing of Carrieri for the 2010 season.
