= Jeff Cunningham =

American soccer player (born 1976)

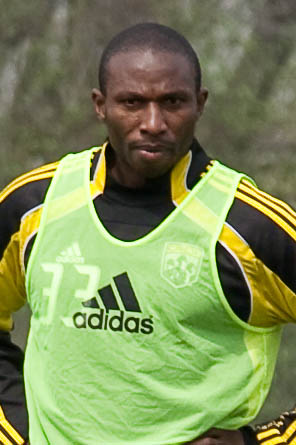
- Cunningham training with the Columbus Crew in 2011

Personal information
- Date of birth: August 21, 1976 (age 50)
- Place of birth: Montego Bay, Jamaica
- Height: 1.73 m (5 ft 8 in)
- Position: Forward

College career
Years	Team	Apps	(Gls)
1994–1997	South Florida Bulls	63	(41)

Senior career*
Years	Team	Apps	(Gls)
1998–2004	Columbus Crew	182	(62)
2005	Colorado Rapids	26	(12)
2006–2007	Real Salt Lake	38	(19)
2007–2008	Toronto FC	32	(6)
2008–2010	FC Dallas	66	(33)
2011	Columbus Crew	21	(2)
2012	Comunicaciones	12	(4)
2012	San Antonio Scorpions	8	(1)
Total		385	(139)

International career
1999	Jamaica	1	(0)
2001–2010	United States	14	(1)
- * Club domestic league appearances and goals

Jeff Cunningham (born August 21, 1976) is a former professional soccer player who played as a forward. He is Major League Soccer's third-all-time leader in regular-season goals scored with 134. Born in Jamaica, Cunningham initially played for the country of his birth before switching to the United States for which he played for the rest of his international career.

== Youth and college ==
Cunningham was born in Jamaica, but moved to Crystal River, Florida, at the age of fourteen. He played college soccer at the University of South Florida from 1994 to 1997. As a sophomore and a junior, Cunningham was named first-team All-Conference USA, and as a senior he was named Conference USA Player of the Year. He finished his career at USF with forty-one goals and thirty-six assists. Cunningham was inducted to the USF Athletics Hall of Fame in August 2024.

== Club career ==
Upon graduating, Cunningham was selected ninth overall in the 1998 MLS College Draft by the Columbus Crew. As a rookie, he played in twenty-five games, mostly as a substitute, and tied the rookie record for goals (since broken by Damani Ralph) with eight. Cunningham became a starter in 1999 and held that role for several years. In 182 games for Columbus, he scored sixty-two goals and notched forty-three assists. He was named to the MLS Best XI in 2002, after scoring sixteen goals and adding five assists. After a disappointing 2004 season Cunningham was traded to Colorado Rapids for a first-round 2006 MLS SuperDraft pick. He left the Crew tied with Brian McBride for the all-time team lead in goals.

Cunningham finished the 2005 season with twelve league goals for Colorado. He scored twice against Fulham F.C. of the Premier League in the 2005 MLS All-Star Game. His showing in an all-star game against Real Madrid also earned good reviews, despite MLS's 5–0 loss. However, after the year Colorado shipped him to Real Salt Lake for Clint Mathis. Cunningham was seventh on the all-time MLS goalscoring list entering the 2006 season.

During the 2006 season Cunningham led the league in scoring with sixteen goals, winning the MLS Golden Boot. He also tied for the second-most assists in the league with eleven. Both totals (16 goals and 11 assists) set single-season records for the RSL franchise.

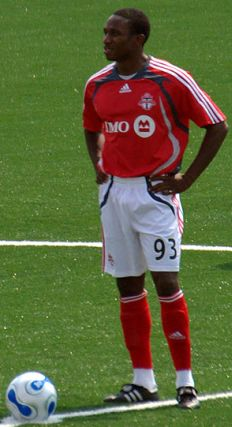
Cunningham with Toronto FC

On May 22, 2007, Cunningham was dealt to Toronto FC in exchange for Alecko Eskandarian and a first-round draft pick in the 2008 MLS SuperDraft. In Toronto, he wore the number 96 to represent the 96 MLS goals he had scored after the conclusion of his first season with Toronto FC.

Cunningham fell out of favor in his second season with Toronto FC, missing scoring a goal line ball that would have taken Toronto to the CONCACAF Champions League. After the match, TFC coach John Carver said "I am thinking, ‘How did he score 99 goals?’ That's what I thought.’"

On August 8, 2008, Cunningham was traded to FC Dallas in exchange for a third-round pick in the 2009 MLS SuperDraft. He scored in his first match with FC Dallas on August 16, 2008, in a 2–1 loss to the Columbus Crew. It was Cunningham's 100th goal in MLS. Jeff played in 11 games with FC Dallas during the 2008 season scoring 5 goals.

Cunningham scored 17 goals in 2009, including four goals on August 1 against the Kansas City Wizards. After Kenny Cooper left the club for 1860 Munich, Cunningham emerged as the team's go-to goal scorer. He netted seven goals in five games in September, winning MLS Player of the Month and went on to win the 2009 MLS Golden Boot. Cunningham ended the 2010 season as the #2 career regular season MLS goal scorer with 132 goals.

After the 2010 MLS season FC Dallas declined Cunningham's contract option and Cunningham elected to participate in the 2010 MLS Re-Entry Draft. On December 15, 2010, Cunningham was selected by Columbus Crew in Stage 2 of the Re-Entry draft. Prior to Columbus re-signing him on January 28, 2011, Cunningham trained with Norwegian Premier League club IK Start and was rumored to be in talks for a permanent move, however no trade came to pass. His return to Columbus Crew was on February 22, 2011, in the second half of the Crew's CONCACAF Champions League quarter final game against Real Salt Lake. On July 7, 2011, Cunningham scored his 133rd career MLS goal to tie the league's all-time scoring record. The goal came in the 90th minute on a header to win a game against the Vancouver Whitecaps FC by a score of 1–0. He scored his 134th goal—a penalty kick in a 6–2 loss to Seattle Sounders FC—to claim the record outright on August 27.

At season's end, Columbus declined his 2012 contract option and he entered the 2011 MLS Re-Entry Draft. Cunningham was not selected in the draft and became a free agent. In January 2012, Cunningham signed on with Comunicaciones of Guatemala for the 2012 Torneo Clausura.

After his release by Comunicaciones, Cunningham signed with NASL club San Antonio Scorpions FC on July 23, 2012.

As of November 29, 2013, Cunningham was on trial with Vicem Hai Phong F.C. of Vietnam's V.League 1.

== International career ==
In 1999, Cunningham played for Jamaica in a friendly international against Ghana.

Cunningham became a U.S. citizen in November 2001, and received his first cap for the United States national team less than a month later, on December 9, in a friendly against South Korea. He made his first start in a World Cup qualifier on September 7, 2005, against Guatemala. After a four-year absence from the national team, Cunningham was called up by Bob Bradley for friendlies against Slovakia and Denmark in November 2009. In a friendly against Denmark on November 18, 2009, he scored his first career international goal.

== Personal life ==
Jeff and his wife, Jocelyn have two children, Mikayla, born in 2008 and Eli born in 2014.

Cunningham became a naturalized U.S. citizen on November 13, 2001.

== Career statistics ==
=== Club ===
Appearances and goals by club, season and competition
Club	Season	League			National cup (Note: Includes Open Cup, Voyageurs Cup)		League cup		Continental		Total	
Club	Season	Division	Apps	Goals	Apps	Goals	Apps	Goals	Apps	Goals	Apps	Goals
Columbus Crew	1998	Major League Soccer	25	8	3	1	2	0	0	0	30	9
Columbus Crew	1999	Major League Soccer	28	12	2	0	5	3	0	0	35	15
Columbus Crew	2000	Major League Soccer	29	2	3	0	0	0	0	0	32	2
Columbus Crew	2001	Major League Soccer	22	10	3	4	2	0	0	0	27	14
Columbus Crew	2002	Major League Soccer	27	16	3	0	5	0	0	0	35	16
Columbus Crew	2003	Major League Soccer	21	5	1	0	0	0	0	0	22	5
Columbus Crew	2004	Major League Soccer	30	9	1	0	2	0	0	0	33	9
Columbus Crew	Total		182	62	16	5	16	3	0	0	214	70
Colorado Rapids	2005	Major League Soccer	26	12	1	0	3	1	0	0	30	13
Real Salt Lake	2006	Major League Soccer	31	16	2	1	0	0	0	0	33	17
Real Salt Lake	2007	Major League Soccer	7	3	0	0	0	0	0	0	7	3
Real Salt Lake	Total		38	19	2	1	0	0	0	0	40	20
Toronto FC	2007	Major League Soccer	16	3	0	0	0	0	0	0	16	3
Toronto FC	2008	Major League Soccer	16	3	4	0	0	0	0	0	20	3
Toronto FC	Total		32	6	4	0	0	0	0	0	36	6
FC Dallas	2008	Major League Soccer	11	5	0	0	0	0	0	0	11	5
FC Dallas	2009	Major League Soccer	28	17	0	0	0	0	0	0	28	17
FC Dallas	2010	Major League Soccer	27	11	0	0	3	1	0	0	30	12
FC Dallas	Total		66	33	0	0	3	1	0	0	69	34
Columbus Crew	2011	Major League Soccer	21	2	1	0	1	0	0	0	23	2
Comunicaciones	2011–12	Liga Nacional	12	4	0	0	0	0	0	0	12	4
San Antonio Scorpions	2012	NASL	8	1	0	0	0	0	0	0	8	1
Career total			385	139	24	6	23	5	0	0	432	150

=== International ===
Appearances and goals by national team and year
National team	Year	Apps	Goals
United States	2001	1	0
United States	2002	4	0
United States	2003	3	0
United States	2004	0	0
United States	2005	2	0
United States	2006	0	0
United States	2007	0	0
United States	2008	0	0
United States	2009	2	1
United States	2010	2	0
Total		14	1

Scores and results list the United States' goal tally first, score column indicates score after each Cunningham goal.

List of international goals scored by Jeff Cunningham
No.	Date	Venue	Opponent	Score	Result	Competition
1	November 18, 2009	NRGi Park, Aarhus, Denmark	Denmark	1–0	1–3	Friendly

== Honors ==
Columbus Crew

- Lamar Hunt U.S. Open Cup: 2002
- MLS Supporters' Shield: 2004

FC Dallas

- Major League Soccer Western Conference Championship: 2010

Individual

- MLS Golden Boot: 2006, 2009
- MLS Best XI: 2002, 2006, 2009
- MLS 100 goals club
- MLS 50/50 Club

== See also ==
- List of association footballers who have been capped for two senior national teams
