= Tom Presthus =

American soccer player

Personal information
- Full name: Thomas Presthus
- Date of birth: April 5, 1975 (age 51)
- Place of birth: Edina, Minnesota, United States
- Height: 6 ft 4 in (1.93 m)
- Position: Goalkeeper

Youth career
- 1993–1996: Southern Methodist University

Senior career*
Years	Team	Apps	(Gls)
1994	Minnesota Thunder		
1997–2000	D.C. United	59	(0)
1998	→ MLS Pro 40 (loan)	4	(0)
2000–2003	Columbus Crew	47	(0)

International career
1999	United States	1	(0)
- * Club domestic league appearances and goals

Thomas Presthus (born April 5, 1975, in Edina, Minnesota) is an American former soccer goalkeeper. He spent seven seasons in Major League Soccer and earned one cap with the U.S. national team in 1999.

== Youth ==
Presthus grew up in Minnesota playing football and hockey. When he was twelve, he broke his neck. As a result, he began playing soccer and basketball. He graduated from Edina High School. Presthus attended Southern Methodist University, playing on the men's soccer team from 1993 to 1996. He completed his bachelor's degree in finance in 1997. In May 1994, he signed with the Minnesota Thunder of USISL.

== Professional ==
In February 1997, D.C. United selected Presthus in the second round (20th overall) of the 1997 MLS College Draft. Presthus spent most of the 1997 as a backup to Scott Garlick. However, by the end of the 1998 season, Prestus had begun to emerge as United's top goalkeeper and the team traded Garlick during the off-season.

On February 5, 2001, United traded Presthus and a tenth round 2001 MLS SuperDraft pick to the Columbus Crew for third round pick in the 2001 MLS SuperDraft. Presthus became the Crew's starting goalkeeper, but on July 23, 2003, he tore the ulnar collateral ligament in his right elbow during a game. He underwent surgery on September 30, 2003, but the rehabilitation went much slower than he expected. As a result, he announced his retirement on January 14, 2004.

== National team ==
Presthus earned his lone cap with the U.S. national team in a 2–1 win over Chile on February 21, 1999. He replaced Zach Thornton at halftime with the score 0-0.

== Post soccer career ==
After retiring from playing, Presthus became a financial planner with The Financial Solutions Network. He is now a vice president with American Electric Power.

== Honors ==
Individual

- MLS All-Star: 1999
