= Tom Fitzgerald (soccer) =

American soccer coach (1951–2004)

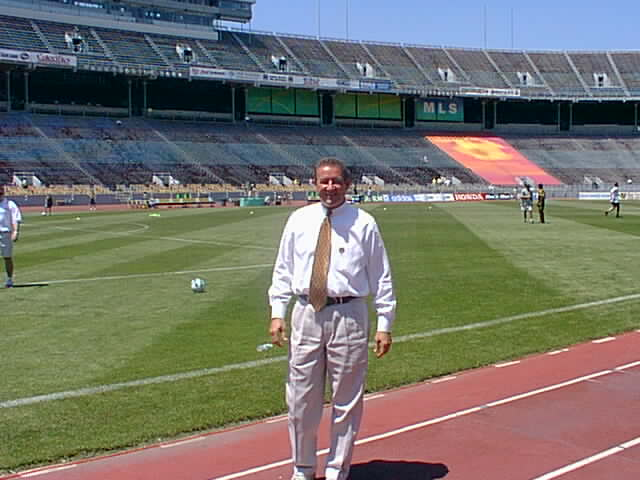
- Fitzgerald in 1998

Personal information
- Date of birth: March 14, 1951
- Place of birth: Lake Luzerne, New York, United States
- Date of death: December 4, 2004 (aged 53)
- Place of death: South Tampa, Florida, United States

College career
| Years | Team | Apps | (Gls) |
- Hudson Valley Community College
| 1973 | South Florida Bulls | | |

Managerial career
- 1978–1981: Jesuit High School
- 1990–1994: U.S. National B Team (assistant)
- 1981–1987: University of Tampa (assistant)
- 1987–1996: University of Tampa
- 1996: Columbus Crew (assistant)
- 1996–2001: Columbus Crew
- 2002–2003: UCLA Bruins
- 2004: University of Tampa

Tom Fitzgerald (March 14, 1951 – December 4, 2004) was an American soccer coach.

== Career ==
Fitzgerald played soccer at Hudson Valley Community College before transferring to the University of South Florida his junior season. He played soccer at USF and he graduated in 1974. In 1978, Jesuit High School in Tampa, Florida hired Fitzgerald as the school's head coach. From 1978 to 1981, he led the team to two district championships and a 35–11–6 record.

He was hired by the University of Tampa as an assistant coach in 1981 and became the team's head coach in 1987. He led the team to five Sunshine State Conference championships and the 1994 NCAA Men's Division II Soccer Championship over Oakland University. During Fitzgerald's nine years as head coach, he compiled a 132–32–11 (75% winning percentage) record.

In 1996, the Columbus Crew of Major League Soccer hired Fitzgerald as an assistant coach. When the Crew head coach Timo Liekoski resigned after a 6–16 start to the season, the team promoted Fitzgerald to head coach. He led the team to a 9–1 record over the last ten games of the season. In 1998, he took the Crew to the U.S. Open Cup where they lost to the Chicago Fire. When he was fired six games into the 2001 season, Fitzgerald had posted a 70–67–7 record.

In March 2002, Fitzgerald returned to the college ranks, this time with the Division I UCLA Bruins. In his first season at UCLA, Fitzgerald led the team to an NCAA Men's Division I Soccer Championship. He became the first NCAA Division I coach to win a title in his first year with a program. He was also just the third coach to win both Division I and II NCAA titles. He was named the 2002 NSCAA/adidas National Coach of the Year.

In 2004, Fitzgerald left UCLA to rejoin the University of Tampa where he began the season 6–9–1. Tom's main motivation for moving back to Tampa was to be closer to his family. On December 4, 2004, Fitzgerald was driving his motorcycle to scout players at a youth soccer festival in Bradenton, Florida when he was struck by an SUV. Fitzgerald initially seemed to be all right, calling his wife after the accident. He was taken to Tampa General Hospital, but hemorrhaging occurred and Fitzgerald died during surgery to repair his torn aorta. A memorial stone for Fitzgerald was unveiled at Columbus Crew Stadium on April 2, 2005.

Tom Fitzgerald memorial plaque
