= Robert Warzycha =

Polish footballer (born 1963)

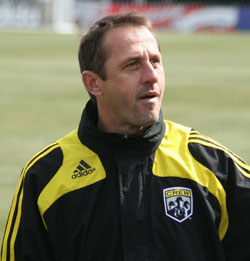
- Warzycha in 2008

Personal information
- Date of birth: 20 August 1963 (age 63)
- Place of birth: Siemkowice, Poland
- Height: 1.75 m (5 ft 9 in)
- Position: Right winger

Youth career
- 1983–1984: Budowlani Działoszyn
- 1984–1985: Warta Sieradz

Senior career*
Years	Team	Apps	(Gls)
1985–1987	Górnik Wałbrzych	31	(5)
1987–1991	Górnik Zabrze	91	(10)
1991–1994	Everton	72	(6)
1994–1995	Pécsi Mecsek	21	(7)
1995–1996	Budapest Honvéd	21	(6)
1996–2002	Columbus Crew	160	(19)
Total		396	(53)

International career
1987–1993	Poland	47	(7)

Managerial career
- 2005: Columbus Crew (interim)
- 2009–2013: Columbus Crew
- 2014: Górnik Zabrze
- 2015: Górnik Zabrze
- * Club domestic league appearances and goals

Robert Warzycha (Polish pronunciation: [ˈrɔbɛrd vaˈʐɨxa]; born 20 August 1963) is a Polish former professional football manager and player.

A right winger, Warzycha had a long career in Europe, playing for teams in Poland, Hungary and England with Everton in the Premier League. He won two Polish Ekstraklasa titles and a Polish Super Cup with Górnik Zabrze. Warzycha was also a regular member of the Poland national team throughout the late 1980s and early 1990s, amassing 47 caps.

He moved to the United States in 1996 and subsequently spent seven seasons in Major League Soccer with Columbus Crew. He later served as a coach for the team, serving as head coach for five seasons.

== Club career ==
After beginning his career in his native Poland, Warzycha moved to England in March 1991 when Howard Kendall signed him for Everton in a £500,000 deal. He started well, scoring twice in his first eight games for Everton, and missing just five league games in the 1991–92.

He was one of only thirteen players not from the British Isles to play on the opening weekend of the FA Premier League along with Jan Stejskal, Peter Schmeichel, Andrei Kanchelskis, Roland Nilsson, Eric Cantona, Hans Segers, John Jensen, Anders Limpar, Gunnar Halle, Craig Forrest, Michel Vonk and Ronnie Rosenthal and was also the first player from mainland Europe to score in the Premier League, finding the net in Everton's second Premier League game - a 3–0 away win over Manchester United. His goal was the only one scored by a Polish player in the competition until Marcin Wasilewski scored in January 2015, more than 22 years later.

His goal against Manchester United in a 3–0 win at Old Trafford proved to be his last goal for Everton. He fell out of favour later that season and played just seven times in the 1993–94 season, and was clearly not part of new manager Mike Walker's plans when he arrived at Goodison Park in January 1994 following the resignation of Howard Kendall. He went to Hungary at the end of the season to sign for Pécsi Mecsek. A year later, he was sold to Kispest Honvéd FC of Hungary.

In 1996, he joined Columbus Crew for the Major League Soccer's inaugural year. Warzycha became a staple in the lineup for five seasons, and then a bit player in his final two, as he battled injuries. He retired as the Crew's all-time assist leader with 61 and also scored 19 goals in MLS league play. During his playing days in Columbus, Warzycha was known as "The Polish Rifle," in part because of his accuracy from free kicks. On 25 March 2000, Warzycha scored the first-ever regular-season "Golden Goal" in Major League Soccer history to defeat the San Jose Earthquakes 2–1. He played two more years for Columbus Crew before retiring from playing in 2002 at the age of 39.

== International career ==
For Poland, Warzycha was capped 47 times, scoring seven goals between 1987 and 1993.

== Managerial career ==
After retiring as a player, he became an assistant coach with the Crew. After Greg Andrulis was fired in July 2005, Warzycha assumed interim head coaching duty. He went back to assisting after Sigi Schmid was hired for the full-time job.

After spending several years as Schmid's assistant, Warzycha was promoted to the head coach position at Columbus Crew for the 2009 MLS season, in which he coached the team to the Supporter Shield, awarded for the most points during the regular season. Warzycha signed a multi-year contract extension with Columbus on 1 September 2011 that kept him under contract through the 2013 season. He was released from his contract early, on 2 September 2013.

== Personal life ==
Robert is the father of professional soccer player Konrad Warzycha, who played for Columbus Crew under his father.

== Career statistics ==
Appearances and goals by national team and year
National team	Year	Apps	Goals
Poland	1987	1	0
Poland	1988	6	1
Poland	1989	6	1
Poland	1990	15	3
Poland	1991	7	1
Poland	1992	7	0
Poland	1993	5	1
Total		47	7

== Honours ==
=== Player ===
Górnik Zabrze

- Ekstraklasa: 1987–88
- Polish Super Cup: 1988

Everton

- Full Members' Cup runner-up: 1990–91

Budapest Honvéd

- Magyar Kupa: 1995–96

Columbus Crew

- U.S. Open Cup: 2002

Individual

- MLS All-Star: 1997, 1999

=== Manager ===
Columbus Crew

- Supporters' Shield: 2009
