= Greg Andrulis =

American soccer coach

Personal information
- Date of birth: February 15, 1958 (age 68)
- Place of birth: Waterbury, Connecticut, United States
- Position: Goalkeeper

College career
Years	Team	Apps	(Gls)
1976–1979	Eastern Connecticut State Warriors		

Managerial career
- 1980: Eastern Connecticut State Warriors (assistant)
- 1981–1982: Springfield Pride (assistant)
- 1983–1985: Clemson Tigers (assistant)
- 1985–1996: Wright State Raiders
- 1996–2001: Columbus Crew (assistant)
- 2001–2005: Columbus Crew
- 2005–2019: George Mason Patriots

Greg Andrulis (born February 15, 1958) is an American retired soccer coach.

Andrulis grew up in Litchfield, Connecticut where he graduated from Litchfield High School in 1976. He was an All-State high school soccer and basketball player and was inducted into the Litchfield High School Hall of Fame in 2007. He then attended Eastern Connecticut State University where he was a goalkeeper on the school's soccer team. He graduated in 1980 with a bachelor's degree in psychology. In 2005, ECSU inducted Andrulis into the school's Athletic Hall of Fame.

In 1980, he served as an assistant coach with the Eastern Connecticut State University men's soccer team. He then moved to Springfield College where he coached the junior varsity and freshmen teams while working on his master's degree in counseling. In 1983, he became an assistant coach at Clemson University. In 1985, he became the head coach at Wright State University. Over twelve seasons, he compiled a 134–72–28 record. On May 28, 2002, he was inducted into the WSU Athletics Hall of Fame. In 1996, the Columbus Crew of Major League Soccer hired Andrulis as the top assistant to head coach Tom Fitzgerald. Andrulis became the Crew's interim coach midway through the 2001 season, after Fitzgerald was fired. He was hired as permanent head coach after the season. In 2002, he led the Crew to its first title, the U.S. Open Cup. In 2004, Andrulis took the Crew on a league-record streak without a loss, and was named MLS Coach of the Year. Following up on a disappointing playoff appearance in 2004, in 2005, Columbus got off to a slow start at 4–10–2, and Andrulis was fired. His assistant, Robert Warzycha led the team for the remainder of the 2005 season in an interim role.

On August 17, 2005, George Mason University hired Andrulis as head coach of the men's soccer team. In 2006, he led George Mason to its first NCAA tournament bid in 20 years.
