= 1999 Dallas Burn season =

Dallas Burn
1999 season
- Owner: Major League Soccer
- Head coach: Dave Dir
- Stadium: Cotton Bowl
- MLS: Western Conference: 2nd Overall: 3rd
- MLS Cup: Lost Western Conference Finals vs. Los Angeles Galaxy (1–2)
- U.S. Open Cup: Lost Quarterfinal vs. Rochester Raging Rhinos (1–2, OT)
- Average home league attendance: 12,211
Home colors	Away colors

The 1999 Dallas Burn season was the fourth season of the Major League Soccer team. The team made the playoffs for the fourth consecutive year.

== Final standings ==
=== Western Conference ===
Pos	Team	Pld	W	SOW	L	GF	GA	GD	Pts	Qualification
1	Los Angeles Galaxy	32	17	3	12	49	29	+20	54	MLS Cup Playoffs
2	Dallas Burn	32	16	3	13	54	35	+19	51	MLS Cup Playoffs
3	Chicago Fire	32	15	3	14	51	36	+15	48	MLS Cup Playoffs
4	Colorado Rapids	32	14	6	12	38	39	−1	48	MLS Cup Playoffs
5	San Jose Clash	32	9	10	13	48	49	−1	37	
6	Kansas City Wizards	32	6	2	24	33	53	−20	20	

Source: MLS

=== Overall Table ===
Pos	Team	Pld	W	SOW	L	GF	GA	GD	Pts	Qualification
1	D.C. United (C, S)	32	17	6	9	65	43	+22	57	CONCACAF Champions' Cup
2	Los Angeles Galaxy	32	17	3	12	49	29	+20	54	CONCACAF Champions' Cup
3	Dallas Burn	32	16	3	13	54	35	+19	51	
4	Chicago Fire	32	15	3	14	51	36	+15	48	
5	Colorado Rapids	32	14	6	12	38	39	−1	48	

Source: MLS
Rules for classification: 1) points; 2) head-to-head record; 3) goal difference; 4) number of goals scored
(C) Champions; (S) Supporters' Shield

== Regular season ==
March 20, 1999 1	Kansas City Wizards	0–4	Dallas Burn	Dallas, Texas
7:30 PM CST	Okafor (yellow card) 89'	Report	Eck (yellow card) 26'; Trotman 53'; Kreis 55', 80', 84'	Stadium: Cotton Bowl; Attendance: 17,112; Referee: Tim Weyland; Assistant referees: Craig Lowry; Sandra Hunt

March 28, 1999 2	Dallas Burn	0–0 (2–3 SO)	Los Angeles Galaxy	Pasadena, California
5:00 PM PST		Report	Peña (yellow card) 1'	Stadium: Rose Bowl; Attendance: 27,034; Referee: Ali Saheli; Assistant referees: Scott Weyland; Reggie Rutty
	Shootout
	Haynes (penalty missed); Suarez (penalty missed); Farrer (penalty scored); Pareja (penalty missed); Eck (penalty scored)		Welton (penalty missed); Jones (penalty scored); Mathis (penalty scored); Hernandez (penalty missed); Vanney (penalty scored)

April 10, 1999 3	Dallas Burn	0–0 (3–1 SO)	Chicago Fire	Chicago, Illinois
7:00 PM CDT	Dade (yellow card) 16' (yellow-red card) 62'	Report		Stadium: Soldier Field; Attendance: 27,311; Referee: Noel Kenny; Assistant referees: Francisco Sanchez; Robert Fereday
	Shootout
	Haynes (penalty scored); Farrer (penalty scored); Rodríguez (penalty missed); Rhine (penalty missed); Eck (penalty scored)		Marsch (penalty scored); Razov (penalty missed); Soehn (penalty missed); Podbrożny (penalty missed)

April 15, 1999 4	Dallas Burn	1–1 (0–3 SO)	Miami Fusion	Fort Lauderdale, Florida
8:00 PM EDT	Kreis (yellow card) 36'; Farrer (red card) 43'; Washington 58'	Report	Heaps (yellow card) 18'; Parra (yellow card) 28' (yellow-red card) 89'; Serna 74' (yellow card) 79'	Stadium: Lockhart Stadium; Attendance: 7,013; Referee: Robert Sheker; Assistant referees: Roger Sill; Greg Watson
	Shootout
	Haynes (penalty missed); Suarez (penalty missed); Trotman (penalty missed)		Gutierrez (penalty scored); Heaps (penalty scored); Cullen (penalty scored)

April 18, 1999 5	Tampa Bay Mutiny	1–2	Dallas Burn	Dallas, Texas
4:00 PM CDT	Shannon 87'	Report	Kreis 39', 90'; Rodríguez (yellow card) 49'; Dade (yellow card) 66'	Stadium: Cotton Bowl; Attendance: 13,697; Referee: Sandra Hunt; Assistant referees: Jorge Reyes; Paul Scott

April 24, 1999 6	Columbus Crew	0–2	Dallas Burn	Dallas, Texas
7:30 PM CDT	Pareja 4'; Kreis 31'	Report		Stadium: Cotton Bowl; Attendance: 12,241; Referee: Richard Heron; Assistant referees: Chip Reed; Sergio Vega

April 30, 1999 7	Dallas Burn	1–1 (2–3 SO)	San Jose Clash	San Jose, California
7:30 PM PDT	Suarez 7' (yellow card) 12'; Jordan (red card) SO	Report	Doyle (red card) 7'; Wright (yellow card) 10'; Cerritos 14'; Conrad (yellow card) 81'; Baicher (yellow card) 89'	Stadium: Spartan Stadium; Attendance: 10,071; Referee: Reggie Rutty; Assistant referees: Greg Barkey; Terry Mashino
	Shootout
	Haynes (penalty missed); Santel (penalty missed); Farrer (penalty missed); Eck (penalty scored); Tréllez (penalty scored)		Cerritos (penalty scored); Baicher (penalty missed); Clark (penalty scored); Cloutier (penalty missed); Brose (penalty missed) (pen.)

May 8, 1999 8	Colorado Rapids	1–1 (2–1 SO)	Dallas Burn	Dallas, Texas
7:30 PM CDT	McKeon (yellow card) 42'; Bent (yellow card) 60'; Bravo 80'	Report	Kreis 88'	Stadium: Cotton Bowl; Attendance: 10,550; Referee: Marcel Yonan; Assistant referees: Scott Weyland; Misail Tsapos
	Shootout
	DiGiamarino (penalty missed); White (penalty scored); Vaudreuil (penalty missed); McKeon (penalty missed); Martinez (penalty scored)		Haynes (penalty missed); Álvarez (penalty scored); Farrer (penalty missed); Pareja (penalty missed); Deering (penalty missed)

May 15, 1999 9	San Jose Clash	1–2	Dallas Burn	Dallas, Texas
7:30 PM CDT	Barrett 32'; Martinez (yellow card) 42'	Report	Rhine 9', 65'; Eck (yellow card) 29'; Álvarez (yellow card) 33'	Stadium: Cotton Bowl; Attendance: 16,372; Referee: Michael Kennedy; Assistant referees: Roger Sill; Glenn Prechac

May 22, 1999 10	Dallas Burn	1–1 (1–3 SO)	San Jose Clash	San Jose, California
8:00 PM PDT	Broome (yellow card) 27'; Kreis 81'	Report	Cerritos 10'; Martinez (yellow card) 24'	Stadium: Spartan Stadium; Attendance: 12,133; Referee: Noel Kenny; Assistant referees: Cory Dean; Terry Mashino
	Shootout
	Tréllez (penalty missed); Álvarez (penalty missed); Santel (penalty scored); Farrer (penalty missed)		Cerritos (penalty scored); Lewis (penalty missed); Clark (penalty scored); Brose (penalty scored)

May 26, 1999 11	Miami Fusion	1–2	Dallas Burn	Dallas, Texas
7:30 PM CDT	Rooney (yellow card) 31' (yellow-red card) 79'; Serna 50'; Heaps (yellow card) 51'	Report	Dade (yellow card) 20'; Tréllez 34'; Rodríguez 85'	Stadium: Cotton Bowl; Attendance: 7,529; Referee: Ali Mohamed Bujsaim; Assistant referees: Paul Scott; Misail Tsapos

June 5, 1999 12	Dallas Burn	5–2	MetroStars	East Rutherford, New Jersey
7:00 PM EDT	Tréllez 31'; Santel 39'; Pollard (yellow card) 42'; Kreis 59', 66'; Haynes 78'	Report	Kelly 51'; Walsh 84'	Stadium: Giants Stadium; Attendance: 11,567; Referee: Paul Tamberino; Assistant referees: Greg Barkey; Matt Lawlor

June 12, 1999 13	Dallas Burn	0–1	Kansas City Wizards	Kansas City, Missouri
7:30 PM CDT	Haynes (yellow card) 70'	Report	Deering 61' (o.g.)	Stadium: Arrowhead Stadium; Attendance: 9,336; Referee: Andrew Barnes; Assistant referees: John Konstantinidis; Terry Vaughn

June 16, 1999 14	D.C. United	0–3	Dallas Burn	Dallas, Texas
7:30 PM CDT	Otero (yellow card) 28'; Etcheverry (red card) 77'	Report	Álvarez (yellow card) 29'; Eck (yellow card) 42'; Washington 69', 79'; Deering 75'	Stadium: Cotton Bowl; Attendance: 8,817; Referee: Noel Kenny; Assistant referees: Sergio Vega; Gibby Widner

June 19, 1999 15	Dallas Burn	1–2	Colorado Rapids	Denver, Colorado
7:00 PM MDT	Eck 24'; Pollard (yellow card) 30'; Suarez (yellow card) 66'	Report	Bravo 13'; Dely Valdés 78'	Stadium: Mile High Stadium; Attendance: 11,112; Referee: Reggie Rutty; Assistant referees: Scott Weyland; Todd Perry

June 26, 1999 16	New England Revolution	0–2	Dallas Burn	Dallas, Texas
7:30 PM CDT	Jair (yellow card) 23'; Dunseth (yellow card) 72'	Report	Deering (yellow card) 27'; Rodríguez 37'; Kreis 90'	Stadium: Cotton Bowl; Attendance: 12,561; Referee: Richard Heron; Assistant referees: Glenn Prechac; Paul Scott

July 2, 1999 17	Dallas Burn	1–1 (3–4 SO)	Chicago Fire	Chicago, Illinois
7:30 PM CDT	Pollard (yellow card) 26'; Pareja 35' (pen.) (yellow card) 57'; Dade (yellow card) 41'; Suarez (yellow card) 50'; Farrer (yellow card) 56'; Kreis (yellow card) 63'; Daniv (yellow card) 79'	Report	Brown (yellow card) 10'; Nowak (yellow card) 22'; Thornton (yellow card) 35'; Wolff 65'	Stadium: Soldier Field; Attendance: 12,185; Referee: Baojie Sun; Assistant referees: Andrew Barnes; Terry Vaughn
	Shootout
	Santel (penalty scored); Eck (penalty missed); Tréllez (penalty missed); Rhine (penalty scored); Álvarez (penalty missed); Deering (penalty missed); Farrer (penalty missed); Daniv (penalty scored); Dade (penalty missed); Pollard (penalty missed)		Wolff (penalty missed); Razov (penalty scored); Soehn (penalty scored); Podbrożny (penalty missed); Marsch (penalty missed); Kubík (penalty missed); Armas (penalty missed); Nowak (penalty scored); Kosecki (penalty missed); Gutiérrez (penalty scored)

July 4, 1999 18	Chicago Fire	2–1	Dallas Burn	Dallas, Texas
7:30 PM CDT	Razov 4', 35'; Armas (yellow card) 37'	Report	Kotschau 15' (o.g.)	Stadium: Cotton Bowl; Attendance: 17,621; Referee: Kevin Terry; Assistant referees: Paul Scott; Misail Tsapos

July 10, 1999 19	Kansas City Wizards	0–5	Dallas Burn	Dallas, Texas
8:00 PM CDT	Henderson (yellow card) 84'	Report	Kreis 8', 90'; Pareja (yellow card) 38'; Deering 80'; Broome 84'; Eck 89'	Stadium: Cotton Bowl; Attendance: 7,485; Referee: Tim Weyland; Assistant referees: Richard Heron; Misail Tsapos

July 24, 1999 20	Dallas Burn	1–4	Columbus Crew	Columbus, Ohio
7:30 PM EDT	Deering (yellow card) 31'; Álvarez (yellow card) 32' (yellow-red card) 82'; Eck 90'	Report	Elcock 28'; Cunningham 42'; John 50'; West 71'	Stadium: Crew Stadium; Attendance: 19,356; Referee: Noel Kenny; Assistant referees: Roger Sill; Richard Huber

July 31, 1999 21	Colorado Rapids	2–0	Dallas Burn	Dallas, Texas
7:00 PM CDT	Harris 8'; Dely Valdés (yellow card) 18'; Sawatzky (yellow card) 25'; Jakins (yellow card) 43'; Anderson 58'	Report	Jordan (yellow card) 61'; Broome (yellow card) 86'	Stadium: Cotton Bowl; Attendance: 13,712; Referee: Ted Covaciu-Woods; Assistant referees: George Vergara; Gibby Widner

August 4, 1999 22	MetroStars	0–2	Dallas Burn	Dallas, Texas
7:30 PM CDT	Corrales (yellow card) 47'; Lozzano (yellow card) 89'	Report	Kreis 71'; Tréllez 85'	Stadium: Cotton Bowl; Attendance: 7,622; Referee: Matsumura Kaziuhiko; Assistant referees: Paul Scott; Sergio Vega

August 14, 1999 23	Dallas Burn	0–2	Los Angeles Galaxy	Pasadena, California
7:30 PM PDT	Pollard (yellow card) 30'	Report	Hendrickson 7'; Caligiuri (yellow card) 55'; Jones (yellow card) 62'; Eck 58' (o.g.)	Stadium: Rose Bowl; Attendance: 14,635; Referee: Noel Kenny; Assistant referees: David Bragg; Juan Hernandez

August 18, 1999 24	Dallas Burn	3–0	Colorado Rapids	Denver, Colorado
7:00 PM MDT	Graziani 4'; Pareja 30'; Rodríguez 85'	Report	McKeon (yellow card) 59'	Stadium: Mile High Stadium; Attendance: 5,942; Referee: Nancy Lay; Assistant referees: Cory Dean; Scott McCaslin

August 22, 1999 25	Chicago Fire	3–3 (3–4 SO)	Dallas Burn	Dallas, Texas
12:00 PM CDT	Wolff 49', 90'; Kubík (yellow card) 50'; Kovalenko 53'; Soehn (yellow card) 62'	Report	Graziani 39'; Kreis (yellow card) 42'; Deering 43'; Farrer 55'; Rodríguez (yellow card) 66'; Pollard (yellow card) 73'; Daniv (yellow card) 75'; Haynes (red card) 83'	Stadium: Cotton Bowl; Attendance: 7,237; Referee: Ricardo Valenzuela; Assistant referees: Scott Weyland; Gibby Widner
	Shootout
	Dougherty (penalty scored); Razov (penalty scored); Soehn (penalty missed); Kovalenko (penalty scored); Kubík (penalty missed)		Santel (penalty scored); Farrer (penalty scored); Daniv (penalty scored); Rodríguez (penalty scored)

August 28, 1999 26	Los Angeles Galaxy	0–1	Dallas Burn	Dallas, Texas
8:00 PM CDT	Ibsen (yellow card) 22'; Myers (yellow card) 53'	Report	Graziani 53'	Stadium: Cotton Bowl; Attendance: 14,033; Referee: Brian Hall; Assistant referees: Alex Del Angel; Misail Tsapos

September 4, 1999 27	Dallas Burn	1–4	D.C. United	Washington, D.C.
7:30 PM EDT	Graziani 28' (yellow card) 90'; Pareja (yellow card) 71'; Suarez (yellow card) 84'	Report	Moreno 17'; Etcheverry 24', 47'; Agoos (yellow card) 71'; Maessner 76'; Lassiter (yellow card) 83'	Stadium: Robert F. Kennedy Memorial Stadium; Attendance: 12,093; Referee: Ricardo Valenzuela; Assistant referees: Roger Sill; Jon Wilson

September 11, 1999 28	San Jose Clash	0–1	Dallas Burn	Dallas, Texas
7:30 PM CDT	Cloutier (yellow card) 24'; Mulrooney (yellow card) 77'	Report	Kreis (yellow card) 35' (goal) 78'; Daniv (yellow card) 62'	Stadium: Cotton Bowl; Attendance: 15,584; Referee: Kevin Stott; Assistant referees: Paul Scott; Gibby Widner

September 18, 1999 29	Dallas Burn	1–1 (3–0 SO)	Kansas City Wizards	Kansas City, Missouri
7:30 PM CDT	Eck 75'	Report	Lalas 86'	Stadium: Arrowhead Stadium; Attendance: 6,096; Referee: Alex Prus; Assistant referees: Terry Mashino; Richard Huber
	Shootout
	Daniv (penalty missed); Farrer (penalty scored); Tréllez (penalty scored); Rodríguez (penalty scored)		Johnston (penalty missed); Brown (penalty missed); Klein (penalty missed)

September 24, 1999 30	Dallas Burn	1–0	New England Revolution	Foxborough, Massachusetts
7:30 PM EDT	Pareja 70'; Daniv (yellow card) 76'	Report	Gori (yellow card) 76'	Stadium: Foxboro Stadium; Attendance: 9,273; Referee: Gerry Corrie; Assistant referees: John Spicer-Escalante; Tarek Khan

October 3, 1999 31	Los Angeles Galaxy	3–4	Dallas Burn	Dallas, Texas
12:00 PM CDT	Jolley (yellow card) 11'; Jones (yellow card) 18'; Hermosillo 26', 44'; Pollard 30' (o.g.); Elliott (yellow card) 37'	Report	Kreis 7', 64' (pen.) (yellow card) 66'; Deering 73'; Farrer 77'	Stadium: Cotton Bowl; Attendance: 13,208; Referee: Noel Kenny; Assistant referees: Andrew Barnes; Misail Tsapos

October 10, 1999 32	Dallas Burn	2–1	Tampa Bay Mutiny	Tampa, Florida
8:00 PM EDT	Dade (yellow card) 13'; Washington 16'; Santel (yellow card) 49'; Kreis 82'	Report	Lagos 71'	Stadium: Raymond James Stadium; Attendance: 13,189; Referee: Brian Hall; Assistant referees: Peter Kokolski; Dax Unterreiner

== Playoffs ==
=== Western Conference semifinals ===
October 16, 1999 Game 1	Chicago Fire	1–2	Dallas Burn	Dallas, Texas
4:00 PM CDT	Ball 79'	Report	Daniv (yellow card) 50'; Graziani 52' (yellow card) 61'; Santel 75'; Deering (yellow card) 89'	Stadium: Cotton Bowl; Attendance: 10,980; Referee: Andrew Barnes; Assistant referees: Jorge Reyes; Roger Itaya

October 23, 1999 Game 2	Dallas Burn	0–4	Chicago Fire	Chicago, Illinois
7:00 PM CDT	Jordan (yellow card) 12'; Dade (yellow card) 61'; Pareja (yellow card) 89'	Report	Nowak 18'; Kosecki 36'; Razov 42'; Kovalenko 47' (yellow card) 75'; Armas (yellow card) 54'	Stadium: Soldier Field; Attendance: 13,197; Referee: Ali Saheli; Assistant referees: Tom Bobadilla; George Gansner

October 27, 1999 Game 3	Chicago Fire	2–3	Dallas Burn	Dallas, Texas
7:30 PM CDT	Razov 3'; Marsch 5' (yellow card) 11'; Kosecki (yellow card) 50'; Gutierrez (yellow card) 77'; Thornton (yellow card) 80'; Dougherty (yellow card) 85'; Klopas (yellow card) 88'	Report	Rodríguez (yellow card) 20' (goal) 84' (pen.); Kreis (yellow card) 24'; Graziani (yellow card) 29' (goal) 86'; Dade (yellow card) 43'; Deering 55'	Stadium: Cotton Bowl; Attendance: 9,795; Referee: Kevin Stott; Assistant referees: George Vergara; Scott Weyland

=== Western Conference finals ===
October 31, 1999 Game 1	Dallas Burn	1–2	Los Angeles Galaxy	Pasadena, California
2:30 PM PST	Daniv (yellow card) 30'; Graziani 75'; Broome (yellow card) 84'; Deering (yellow card) 88'	Report	Cienfuegos 39'; Peña (yellow card) 61'; Hendrickson 90'	Stadium: Rose Bowl; Attendance: 17,372; Referee: Noel Kenny; Assistant referees: Tom Bobadilla; Chip Reed

November 7, 1999 Game 2	Los Angeles Galaxy	2–2 (3–4 SO)	Dallas Burn	Dallas, Texas
2:00 PM CST	Hermosillo 12', 55'; Hendrickson (yellow card) 24'; Jones (yellow card) 44'; Cienfuegos (yellow card) 65'	Report	Graziani 33', 74'; Dade (yellow card) 44'; Rodríguez (yellow card) 63'; Daniv (yellow card) 75'	Stadium: Cotton Bowl; Attendance: 13,816; Referee: Ricardo Valenzuela; Assistant referees: Greg Barkey; Robert Fereday
	Shootout
	Jones (penalty scored); Cienfuegos (penalty missed); Vanney (penalty missed); Hendrickson (penalty missed); Hermosillo (penalty scored); Caligiuri (penalty scored); Peña (penalty missed)		Santel (penalty missed); Tréllez (penalty scored); Farrer (penalty missed); Daniv (penalty missed); Rodríguez (penalty scored); Pareja (penalty scored); Graziani (penalty scored)

November 11, 1999 Game 3	Dallas Burn	1–3	Los Angeles Galaxy	Pasadena, California
7:30 PM PST	Farrer (yellow card) 7'; Haynes (yellow card) 26'; Eck (yellow card) 40'; Graziani (yellow card) 72'; Rodríguez (yellow card) 84'; Kreis 89' (pen.)	Report	Vanney 3' (pen.); Hermosillo 20'; Cienfuegos (yellow card) 54' (goal) 68'; Caligiuri (yellow card) 55'; Peña (yellow card) 85'; Hendrickson (yellow card) 88'	Stadium: Rose Bowl; Attendance: 25,703; Referee: Brian Hall; Assistant referees: Roger Sill; Chip Reed

== U.S. Open Cup ==
July 13, 1999 Third Round	Jacksonville Cyclones (Florida)	0–3	(Texas) Dallas Burn	Duncanville, Texas
			Rhine 17', 35', 43'	Stadium: Old Panther Field; Attendance: 347

August 11, 1999 Quarterfinal	Dallas Burn (Texas)	1–2 (OT)	(New York (state)) Rochester Raging Rhinos	Rochester, New York
	Kreis 85'		Biello 71'; Kirmse 110'	Stadium: Frontier Field; Attendance: 10,730
