= 2001 Dallas Burn season =

Dallas Burn
2001 season
- Owner: Major League Soccer
- Head coach: Mike Jeffries
- Stadium: Cotton Bowl
- MLS: Central Division: 3rd Overall: 8th
- MLS Cup: Lost Quarterfinals vs. Chicago Fire (0–2–1)
- U.S. Open Cup: Lost Second Round vs. Seattle Sounders Select (2–3, OT)
- Brimstone Cup: Lost vs. Chicago Fire (1–3–2)
- Average home league attendance: 12,574
Home colors	Away colors

The 2001 Dallas Burn season was the sixth season of the Major League Soccer team. The team made the playoffs for the sixth consecutive year. Due to the September 11 attacks, the final two games of the season were cancelled. It was the first season under new head coach Mike Jeffries. The season was full of highs and lows. The team set the franchise record for highest attended playoff game on September 23, a record which still stands. The team also had their worst run in the U.S. Open Cup in franchise history, losing to the Seattle Sounders in overtime of the second round.

== Final standings ==
Pos	Team	Pld	W	L	T	GF	GA	GD	Pts	Qualification
1	Chicago Fire	27	16	6	5	50	30	+20	53	MLS Cup Playoffs
2	Columbus Crew	26	13	7	6	49	36	+13	45	MLS Cup Playoffs
3	Dallas Burn	26	10	11	5	48	47	+1	35	MLS Cup Playoffs
4	Tampa Bay Mutiny	27	4	21	2	32	68	−36	14	

Source: MLS

== Regular season ==
April 7, 2001 1	Tampa Bay Mutiny	4–2	Dallas Burn	Dallas, Texas
7:30 PM CDT	Ralston 14'; Addo 21'; Curtis 51'; Diallo 55' (pen.); Maessner (yellow card) 79'	Report at the Wayback Machine (archived December 14, 2001)	Rodríguez 16', 26'	Stadium: Cotton Bowl; Attendance: 15,124; Referee: Noel Kenny; Assistant referees: Robert Fereday; Misail Tsapos

April 14, 2001 2	Dallas Burn	1–0	San Jose Earthquakes	San Jose, California
7:00 PM PDT	Rhine 19'; Deering (yellow card) 40'; Dade (yellow card) 46'; Pareja (yellow card) 52'; Rodríguez (yellow card) 90'	Report at the Wayback Machine (archived August 21, 2001)	Agoos (yellow card) 49'	Stadium: Spartan Stadium; Attendance: 13,919; Referee: Ricardo Valenzuela; Assistant referees: Tom Bobadilla; Jon Wilson

April 21, 2001 3	Chicago Fire	2–3 (OT)	Dallas Burn	Dallas, Texas
2:00 PM CDT	Whitfield (yellow card) 32'; Bocanegra 42'; Wolyniec (yellow card) 49'; J. Beasley 81'	Report at the Wayback Machine (archived August 21, 2001)	Pareja (yellow card) 17'; Suarez (yellow card) 48'; Deering (yellow card) 51'; Rhine 82'; Kreis 91+'; Graziani (yellow card) 86' 96'	Stadium: Cotton Bowl; Attendance: 9,785; Referee: Brian Hall; Assistant referees: Tom Bobadilla; Paul Scott

April 28, 2001 4	Dallas Burn	2–3	MetroStars	East Rutherford, New Jersey
7:00 PM EDT	Joseph (yellow card) 23'; Farrer 71'; Vaca (yellow card) 75'; Rhine (yellow card) 88'; Rodríguez 93+' (pen.)	Report at the Wayback Machine (archived August 13, 2001)	Comas (yellow card) 13' (yellow-red card) 58'; Villegas 22'; Chung 32'; Mathis 60'; Jolley (yellow card) 93+'	Stadium: Giants Stadium; Attendance: 17,543; Referee: Terry Vaughn; Assistant referees: Craig Lowry; Nathan Clement

May 5, 2001 5	Colorado Rapids	1–0	Dallas Burn	Dallas, Texas
7:30 PM CDT	Vermillion (yellow card) 19'; Dawes (yellow card) 61'; Spencer (yellow card) 64'; Bravo 87'	Report at the Wayback Machine (archived August 13, 2001)	Graziani (yellow card) 8'; Eck (red card) 76'	Stadium: Cotton Bowl; Attendance: 14,504; Referee: Kevin Stott; Assistant referees: Tom Bobadilla; Jorge Reyes

May 12, 2001 6	Columbus Crew	0–4	Dallas Burn	Dallas, Texas
7:30 PM CDT	Elcock (yellow card) 41'; Clark (yellow card) 48'; Lapper (yellow card) 52'	Report at the Wayback Machine (archived May 19, 2001)	Pareja (yellow card) 32'; Rodríguez 45' (pen.); Kreis 58'; Rhine (yellow card) 64'; Farrer 77'; Graziani 83'	Stadium: Cotton Bowl; Attendance: 14,087; Referee: Brian Hall; Assistant referees: Jon Wilson; David Bragg

May 19, 2001 7	Dallas Burn	0–0 (OT)	Los Angeles Galaxy	Pasadena, California
7:00 PM PDT	Suarez (yellow card) 35'; Broome (yellow card) 43'; Rodríguez (yellow card) 81'	Report at the Wayback Machine (archived August 21, 2001)	Hernández (yellow card) 45'	Stadium: Rose Bowl; Attendance: 15,881; Referee: Roger Sill; Assistant referees: Paul Scott; Richard Huber

May 23, 2001 8	San Jose Earthquakes	2–0	Dallas Burn	Dallas, Texas
7:30 PM CDT	Cerritos 15'; De Rosario 92+'	Report at the Wayback Machine (archived June 22, 2001)	Joseph (yellow card) 40'; Farrer (yellow card) 93+'	Stadium: Cotton Bowl; Attendance: 7,505; Referee: Ricardo Salazar; Assistant referees: Tom Bobadilla; Misail Tsapos

June 2, 2001 9	Miami Fusion	6–2	Dallas Burn	Dallas, Texas
7:30 PM CDT	Marshall 2'; Serna 25', 84', 87'; Pineda Chacón 34'; Mastroeni (yellow card) 29' (goal) 52'; McKinley (yellow card) 44'	Report at the Wayback Machine (archived June 19, 2001)	Rhine 8'; Eck (yellow card) 51'; Graziani 80'	Stadium: Cotton Bowl; Attendance: 10,049; Referee: Marcel Yonan; Assistant referees: Jorge Reyes; Paul Scott

June 6, 2001 10	Dallas Burn	1–0	Tampa Bay Mutiny	Tampa, Florida
7:00 PM EDT	Kreis 15'	Report at the Wayback Machine (archived August 21, 2001)		Stadium: Raymond James Stadium; Attendance: 5,834; Referee: Gus St. Silva; Assistant referees: Craig Lowry; Jeffery Feulner

June 9, 2001 11	D.C. United	0–3	Dallas Burn	Dallas, Texas
12:00 PM CDT	Watson (yellow card) 8'; Alegria (yellow card) 32'; Convey (yellow card) 64'	Report at the Wayback Machine (archived June 29, 2001)	Suarez 17'; Rodríguez (yellow card) 18'; Rhine 29'; Farrer (yellow card) 60'; Martínez 73'	Stadium: Cotton Bowl; Attendance: 11,114; Referee: Alex Prus; Assistant referees: Richard Huber; Jose Andrade

June 16, 2001 12	Dallas Burn	6–3	Colorado Rapids	Denver, Colorado
7:00 PM MDT	Vermillion 5' (o.g.); Suarez 29'; Vaca 35'; Key 56' (o.g.); Pareja (yellow card) 68'; Broome 83'; Korol 90'	Report at the Wayback Machine (archived June 29, 2001)	Balboa 25'; Díaz Arce 28', 36'; Key (yellow card) 73'; Spencer (yellow card) 81'	Stadium: Mile High Stadium; Attendance: 12,652; Referee: Tim Weyland; Assistant referees: David Bragg; Cory Dean

June 23, 2001 13	Columbus Crew	2–1	Dallas Burn	Dallas, Texas
7:00 PM CDT	Lapper 29' (yellow card) 91+'; Cunningham (red card) 44'; West 54'	Report at the Wayback Machine (archived July 7, 2001)	Graziani 19'; Broome (yellow card) 88'	Stadium: Cotton Bowl; Attendance: 10,940; Referee: Michael Kennedy; Assistant referees: George Gansner; Richard Huber

June 30, 2001 14	Los Angeles Galaxy	0–0 (OT)	Dallas Burn	Dallas, Texas
3:00 PM CDT	Elliott (yellow card) 15'; Califf (yellow card) 35'; Caligiuri (yellow card) 47'	Report at the Wayback Machine (archived July 15, 2001)	Suarez (yellow card) 43'	Stadium: Cotton Bowl; Attendance: 16,104; Referee: Paul Tamberino; Assistant referees: Robert Fereday; Misail Tsapos

July 4, 2001 15	New England Revolution	1–1 (OT)	Dallas Burn	Dallas, Texas
7:30 PM CDT	Catê 29'; Franchino (yellow card) 56'; Asad (yellow card) 80'; Wright (yellow card) 91'	Report at the Wayback Machine (archived July 7, 2001)	Deering (yellow card) 68'; Dade (yellow card) 86'; Graziani (yellow card) 88'; Johnson 95+'	Stadium: Cotton Bowl; Attendance: 21,343; Referee: Rich Grady; Assistant referees: Misail Tsapos; Glenn Prechac

July 7, 2001 16	Dallas Burn	2–2 (OT)	Columbus Crew	Columbus, Ohio
4:00 PM EDT	Graziani (yellow card) 43'; Deering (yellow card) 61'; Pareja (yellow card) 71'; Rodríguez 75'; Kreis 83'	Report at the Wayback Machine (archived July 10, 2001)	Pérez (yellow card) 71' (goal) 81'; Cunningham (yellow card) 76'; Buddle 90'	Stadium: Columbus Crew Stadium; Attendance: 18,937; Referee: Brian Hall; Assistant referees: Glenn Prechac; Steven Davidson

July 14, 2001 17	Dallas Burn	2–3	Kansas City Wizards	Kansas City, Missouri
7:30 PM CDT	Pareja 21'; Evans (yellow card) 47'; Graziani 53'; Farrer (yellow card) 91+'	Report at the Wayback Machine (archived July 17, 2001)	Lassiter 73', 75'; Lowe 89' (yellow card) 92+'	Stadium: Arrowhead Stadium; Attendance: 8,031; Referee: Noel Kenny; Assistant referees: Richard Huber; George Gansner

July 18, 2001 18	Tampa Bay Mutiny	0–3	Dallas Burn	Dallas, Texas
7:30 PM CDT	Denton (yellow card) 7'	Report at the Wayback Machine (archived July 26, 2001)	Dade (yellow card) 26'; Kreis 36'; Graziani 49'; Rodríguez 54' (pen.)	Stadium: Cotton Bowl; Attendance: 7,119; Referee: Kevin Terry; Assistant referees: Misail Tsapos; Jasen Anno

July 21, 2001 19	Dallas Burn	1–2 (OT)	Chicago Fire	Chicago, Illinois
7:00 PM CDT	Graziani 11'; Farrer (yellow card) 36'; Jordan (yellow card) 74'; Kubík (red card) 74'	Report at the Wayback Machine (archived July 26, 2001)	Kovalenko (yellow card) 62'; Stoichkov 77' (pen.); Wynalda 99'	Stadium: Soldier Field; Attendance: 20,357; Referee: Richard Heron; Assistant referees: George Gansner; Richard Huber

August 4, 2001 20	Dallas Burn	1–5	New England Revolution	Foxboro, Massachusetts
7:30 PM EDT	Graziani (yellow card) 14'; Evans (yellow card) 38' (yellow-red card) 71'; Korol 86'	Report at the Wayback Machine (archived August 18, 2001)	Sunsing 9'; Pierce (yellow card) 15'; Franchino (yellow card) 25'; Chronopoulos 49+', 81'; Okoh (yellow card) 73' (goal) 76'; Catê 79'; Woods (yellow card) 89'	Stadium: Foxboro Stadium; Attendance: 10,326; Referee: Tim Weyland; Assistant referees: Steve Taylor; Bill Dittmar

August 11, 2001 21	MetroStars	0–3	Dallas Burn	Dallas, Texas
7:30 PM CDT	Petke (yellow card) 28' (yellow-red card) 39'; Faria (yellow card) 90'	Report at the Wayback Machine (archived August 22, 2001)	Kreis (yellow card) 22' (goal) 34'; Vaca 25'; Suarez (yellow card) 42'; Broome (yellow card) 44'; Johnson 74'	Stadium: Cotton Bowl; Attendance: 11,877; Referee: Rich Grady; Assistant referees: George Vergara; Greg Watson

August 15, 2001 22	Dallas Burn	3–0	Columbus Crew	Columbus, Ohio
7:30 PM EDT	Martínez (yellow card) 83'	Report at the Wayback Machine (archived August 18, 2001)	Maisonneuve 18'; Duhaney (yellow card) 54'; Washington 75'; Pérez 91+'	Stadium: Columbus Crew Stadium; Attendance: 19,008; Referee: Kevin Stott; Assistant referees: Steve Taylor; John Konstantinidis

August 18, 2001 23	Dallas Burn	2–4	Miami Fusion	Fort Lauderdale, Florida
7:30 PM EDT	Kreis 23'; Deering 56'; Dade (yellow card) 68'	Report at the Wayback Machine (archived August 22, 2001)	Pineda Chacón 36' 78'; Preki 51'; Henderson 90'	Stadium: Lockhart Stadium; Attendance: 9,750; Referee: Paul Tamberino; Assistant referees: Robert Fereday; Gibby Widner

August 25, 2001 24	Kansas City Wizards	0–3	Dallas Burn	Dallas, Texas
7:30 PM CDT	Vermes (yellow card) 36'; Gregor (yellow card) 60'; Zavagnin (yellow card) 77'	Report at the Wayback Machine (archived September 8, 2001)	Graziani 7', 57'; Rodríguez (yellow card) 22'; Kubík 37'; Korol (yellow card) 62'; Farrer (yellow card) 74'; Broome (yellow card) 80'	Stadium: Cotton Bowl; Attendance: 13,914; Referee: Gus St. Silva; Assistant referees: Thomas Supple; Paul Scott

August 29, 2001 25	Dallas Burn	3–2 (OT)	Tampa Bay Mutiny	Tampa, Florida
7:00 PM EDT	Pareja 25'; Graziani 67'; Rodríguez 97'	Report at the Wayback Machine (archived November 8, 2001)	Denton (yellow card) 1'; Ralston 8'; Peña (yellow card) 57'; Barclay 89'	Stadium: Raymond James Stadium; Attendance: 4,286; Referee: Reggie Rutty; Assistant referees: Greg Watson; Jeffery Feulner

September 8, 2001 26	Dallas Burn	2–2 (OT)	Chicago Fire	Chicago, Illinois
7:00 PM CDT	Dade (yellow card) 16'; Suarez (yellow card) 31'; Farrer (yellow card) 40'; Rhine 87'; Graziani 91+'	Report at the Wayback Machine (archived November 8, 2001)	Marsch (yellow card) 11'; Razov (yellow card) 31'; Gutiérrez 68'; Nowak 81'; Vaudreuil (yellow card) 83'	Stadium: Soldier Field; Attendance: 24,866; Referee: Noel Kenny; Assistant referees: Chip Reed; Francisco Sanchez

September 12, 2001 27	Dallas Burn	–	D.C. United	Washington, D.C.
7:30 PM EDT				Stadium: Robert F. Kennedy Memorial Stadium
Note: Cancelled due to September 11 attacks

September 15, 2001 28	Chicago Fire	–	Dallas Burn	Dallas, Texas
7:30 PM CDT				Stadium: Cotton Bowl
Note: Cancelled due to September 11 attacks

== Playoffs ==
=== Quarterfinals ===
September 20, 2001 Game 1	Dallas Burn	0–2	Chicago Fire	Chicago, Illinois
7:30 PM CDT	Pareja (yellow card) 15'; Rodríguez (yellow card) 30'; Kreis (yellow card) 69'; Graziani (yellow card) 79'; Martínez (yellow card) 89'; Jordan (yellow card) 91+'; Farrer (red card) 94+'	Report at the Wayback Machine (archived October 29, 2001)	Razov (yellow card) 14'; Bocanegra (yellow card) 28' (goal) 40'; Gutiérrez (yellow card) 55'; Daniv (yellow card) 97+'; Whitfield 98+'	Stadium: Soldier Field; Attendance: 8,314; Referee: Gus St. Silva; Assistant referees: Steven Davidson; Francisco Sanchez

September 23, 2001 Game 2	Chicago Fire	1–1 (OT)	Dallas Burn	Dallas, Texas
4:00 PM CDT	Kovalenko (yellow card) 26'; Gutiérrez (yellow card) 56'; Vaudreuil (yellow card) 72'; J. Beasley 84'	Report at the Wayback Machine (archived December 22, 2001)	Broome (yellow card) 5'; Deering 27'; Rhine (yellow card) 46'	Stadium: Cotton Bowl; Attendance: 17,149; Referee: Kevin Stott; Assistant referees: Paul Scott; Misail Tsapos

September 29, 2001 Game 3	Dallas Burn	0–2	Chicago Fire	Chicago, Illinois
7:00 PM CDT	Deering (yellow card) 30'; Graziani (yellow card) 34'; Broome (yellow card) 46+'; Suarez (yellow card) 68'; Korol (yellow card) 73'; Pareja (red card) 75'	Report at the Wayback Machine (archived October 29, 2001)	Armas (yellow card) 7'; Kovalenko 17'; Gutiérrez (yellow card) 25'; Armas 55'; Bocanegra (yellow card) 74'; Vaudreuil (yellow card) 90'	Stadium: Soldier Field; Attendance: 12,811; Referee: Tim Weyland; Assistant referees: George Gansner; Richard Huber

== U.S. Open Cup ==
June 27, 2001 Second Round	Seattle Sounders Select (Washington (state))	3–2 (OT)	(Texas) Dallas Burn	Duncanville, Texas
	Foisie 45'; Kingsley 69'; Ness 97'		Korol 65'; Graziani 78'	Stadium: Old Panther Field; Attendance: 554
