= 1999 Major League Soccer season =

4th season of Major League Soccer

- Season: 1999
- Teams: 12
- MLS Cup: D.C. United (3rd title)
- Supporters' Shield: D.C. United (2nd shield)
- CONCACAF Champions' Cup: D.C. United; Los Angeles Galaxy
- Matches: 192
- Goals: 549 (2.86 per match)
- Top goalscorer: Stern John; Roy Lassiter; Jason Kreis (18 goals)
- Highest attendance: 73,123; SJ 1–1 DC (July 4, 1999)
- Lowest attendance: 4,631; KC 1–2 COL (July 7, 1999)
- Total attendance: 2,742,108
- Average attendance: 14,282

Locations of teams for the 1999 Major League Soccer season
Western Conference Eastern Conference

The 1999 Major League Soccer season was the fourth season of Major League Soccer. It was also the 87th season of FIFA-sanctioned soccer in the United States, and the 21st with a national first-division league. This was the last season which used the 35 yard line shootout rule to resolve tied games, and that of the countdown timer, with MLS Cup 1999 adopting the IFAB-standard running clock thereafter.

The Columbus Crew moved into the first soccer-specific stadium when Columbus Crew Stadium opened on May 15, 1999.

The regular season began on March 20, and concluded on October 10. The 1999 MLS Cup Playoffs began on October 16, and concluded with MLS Cup 1999 on November 21. D.C. United won their second double by winning the Supporters' Shield and defeating the Los Angeles Galaxy in MLS Cup.

== Overview ==
=== Season format ===
The season began on March 20 and concluded with MLS Cup on November 21. The 12 teams were split evenly into two conferences. Each team played 32 games that were evenly divided between home and away. Each team played every other team in their conference four times, for a total of 20 games. The remaining schedule consisted of two games against each team from the opposite conference.

The top four teams from each conference qualified for the MLS Cup Playoffs. The conference semifinals and finals were played as a best-of-three series, and the winners advanced to MLS Cup. In all rounds, draws were broken by penalty shootout if necessary. The away goals rule was not used in any round.

The team with the most points in the regular season was awarded the MLS Supporters' Shield. The winner of MLS Cup, and the runner-up, qualified for the CONCACAF Champions' Cup.

=== Stadiums and locations ===
Team	Stadium	Capacity
Chicago Fire	Soldier Field	66,944
Colorado Rapids	Mile High Stadium	76,273
Columbus Crew	Columbus Crew Stadium	22,555
D.C. United	RFK Stadium	46,000
Dallas Burn	Cotton Bowl	92,100
Kansas City Wizards	Arrowhead Stadium	81,425
Los Angeles Galaxy	Rose Bowl	92,542
MetroStars	Giants Stadium	80,200
Miami Fusion	Lockhart Stadium	20,450
New England Revolution	Foxboro Stadium	60,292
San Jose Clash	Spartan Stadium	30,456
Tampa Bay Mutiny	Raymond James Stadium	69,218

=== Personnel and sponsorships ===
Team	Head coach	Captain	Shirt sponsor
Chicago Fire	(United States) Bob Bradley		—
Colorado Rapids	(United States) Glenn Myernick		
Columbus Crew	(United States) Tom Fitzgerald		Snickers
D.C. United	(Netherlands) Thomas Rongen		MasterCard
Dallas Burn	(United States) Dave Dir		
Kansas City Wizards	(England) Ron Newman		—
Los Angeles Galaxy	(Ecuador) Octavio Zambrano		—
MetroStars	(Federal Republic of Yugoslavia) Bora Milutinović	(United States) Tab Ramos	—
Miami Fusion	(Brazil) Ivo Wortmann		—
New England Revolution	(Italy) Walter Zenga		—
San Jose Clash	(England) Brian Quinn	(United States) John Doyle	Honda
Tampa Bay Mutiny	(United States) Tim Hankinson		

=== Coaching changes ===
Team	Outgoing coach	Manner of departure	Date of vacancy	Incoming coach	Date of appointment
Kansas City Wizards	(England) Ron Newman	Fired	April 14, 1999	(England) Ken Fogarty	April 14, 1999
Los Angeles Galaxy	(Ecuador) Octavio Zambrano	Fired	April 22, 1999	(United States) Sigi Schmid	April 22, 1999
Kansas City Wizards	(England) Ken Fogarty	End of interim period	April 28, 1999	(United States) Bob Gansler	April 28, 1999
San Jose Clash	(Republic of Ireland) Brian Quinn	Fired	September 16, 1999	(Chile) Jorge Espinoza	September 16, 1999
San Jose Clash	(Chile) Jorge Espinoza	End of interim period	September 22, 1999	(Germany) Lothar Osiander	September 22, 1999

== Standings ==
=== Eastern Conference ===
Pos	Team	Pld	W	SOW	L	GF	GA	GD	Pts	Qualification
1	D.C. United	32	17	6	9	65	43	+22	57	MLS Cup Playoffs
2	Columbus Crew	32	13	6	13	48	39	+9	45	MLS Cup Playoffs
3	Tampa Bay Mutiny	32	9	5	18	51	50	+1	32	MLS Cup Playoffs
4	Miami Fusion	32	8	5	19	42	59	−17	29	MLS Cup Playoffs
5	New England Revolution	32	7	5	20	38	53	−15	26	
6	MetroStars	32	4	3	25	32	64	−32	15	

Source: MLS

=== Western Conference ===
Pos	Team	Pld	W	SOW	L	GF	GA	GD	Pts	Qualification
1	Los Angeles Galaxy	32	17	3	12	49	29	+20	54	MLS Cup Playoffs
2	Dallas Burn	32	16	3	13	54	35	+19	51	MLS Cup Playoffs
3	Chicago Fire	32	15	3	14	51	36	+15	48	MLS Cup Playoffs
4	Colorado Rapids	32	14	6	12	38	39	−1	48	MLS Cup Playoffs
5	San Jose Clash	32	9	10	13	48	49	−1	37	
6	Kansas City Wizards	32	6	2	24	33	53	−20	20	

Source: MLS

=== Overall standings ===
Pos	Team	Pld	W	SOW	L	GF	GA	GD	Pts	
1	D.C. United (C, S)	32	17	6	9	65	43	+22	57	Qualification for the CONCACAF Champions' Cup
2	Los Angeles Galaxy	32	17	3	12	49	29	+20	54	Qualification for the CONCACAF Champions' Cup
3	Dallas Burn	32	16	3	13	54	35	+19	51	
4	Chicago Fire	32	15	3	14	51	36	+15	48	
5	Colorado Rapids	32	14	6	12	38	39	−1	48	
6	Columbus Crew	32	13	6	13	48	39	+9	45	
7	San Jose Clash	32	9	10	13	48	49	−1	37	
8	Tampa Bay Mutiny	32	9	5	18	51	50	+1	32	
9	Miami Fusion	32	8	5	19	42	59	−17	29	
10	New England Revolution	32	7	5	20	38	53	−15	26	
11	Kansas City Wizards	32	6	2	24	33	53	−20	20	
12	MetroStars	32	4	3	25	32	64	−32	15	

Source: MLS
Rules for classification: 1) points; 2) head-to-head record; 3) goal difference; 4) number of goals scored
(C) MLS Cup champions; (S) Supporters' Shield winners

== MLS Cup playoffs ==
=== Bracket ===
Conference semifinals
E1	D.C. United	2	0 (3)	x
E4	Miami	0	0 (2)	x
Eastern Conference
E2	Columbus	2	2	x
E3	Tampa Bay	0	0	x
W1	Los Angeles	3	2	x
W4	Colorado	0	0	x
Western Conference
W2	Dallas	2	0	3
W3	Chicago	1	4	2

Conference finals
E1	D.C. United	2	1	4
E2	Columbus	1	5	0
W1	Los Angeles	2	2 (3)	3
W2	Dallas	1	2 (4)	1

MLS Cup
E1	D.C. United	2
W1	Los Angeles	0

- Best of Three series winner will advance.

=== Conference semifinals ===
Eastern Conference

October 16, 1999
Game 1

D.C. United	2–0	Miami Fusion
Moreno 34', 88'	Report

RFK Stadium, Washington, D.C.
Attendance: 18,011
Referee: Tim Weyland
October 24, 1999
Game 2

Miami Fusion	0–0	D.C. United
	Report
Penalties
Mastroeni (penalty missed); Heaps (penalty missed); Rooney (penalty scored); Martínez (penalty scored); Vargas (penalty missed); Marshall (penalty missed)	2–3	(penalty scored) Etcheverry; (penalty missed) Wood; (penalty missed) Agoos; (penalty scored) Soñora; (penalty missed) Aunger; (penalty scored) Lassiter

Lockhart Stadium, Fort Lauderdale, Florida
Attendance: 8,446
Referee: Ricardo Valenzuela
- D.C. United advance 2–0, to the Conference Finals.

October 17, 1999
Game 1

Columbus Crew	2–0	Tampa Bay Mutiny
John 78', 84'	Report

Columbus Crew Stadium, Columbus, Ohio
Attendance: 9,188
Referee: Paul Tamberino
October 22, 1999
Game 2

Tampa Bay Mutiny	0–2	Columbus Crew
	Report	West 23'; Cunningham 88'

Raymond James Stadium, Tampa, Florida
Attendance: 14,392
Referee: Tim Weyland
- Columbus Crew advance 2–0, to the Conference Finals.

Western Conference

October 17, 1999
Game 1

Los Angeles Galaxy	3–0	Colorado Rapids
Hendrickson 8'; Vanney 52' (pen.); Jones 57'	Report

Rose Bowl, Pasadena, California
Attendance: 16,307
Referee: Marcel Yonan
October 24, 1999
Game 2

Colorado Rapids	0–2	Los Angeles Galaxy
	Report	Pena 74'; Franchino 84'

Mile High Stadium, Denver, Colorado
Attendance: 6,542
Referee: Rich Grady
- Los Angeles Galaxy advance 2–0, to the Conference Finals.

October 16, 1999
Game 1

Dallas Burn	2–1	Chicago Fire
Graziani 52'; Santel 75'	Report	Ball 79'

Cotton Bowl, Dallas, Texas
Attendance: 10,980
Referee: Andrew Barnes
October 23, 1999
Game 2

Chicago Fire	4–0	Dallas Burn
Nowak 18'; Kosecki 36'; Razov 43'; Kovalenko 46'	Report

Soldier Field, Chicago, Illinois
Attendance: 13,197
Referee: Ali Saheli
October 27, 1999
Game 3

Dallas Burn	3–2	Chicago Fire
Deering 55'; Rodríguez 84' (pen.); Graziani 86'	Report	Razov 3'; Marsch 5'

Cotton Bowl, Dallas, Texas
Attendance: 9,795
Referee: Kevin Stott
- Dallas Burn advance 2–1, to the Conference Finals.

=== Conference finals ===
October 31, 1999
Game 1

D.C. United	2–1	Columbus Crew
Moreno 15'; Olsen 72'	Report	Cunningham 82'

RFK Stadium, Washington, D.C.
Attendance: 14,529
Referee: Kevin Stott
November 7, 1999
Game 2

Columbus Crew	5–1	D.C. United
Elcock 20'; Cunningham 41'; Stern John 48', 61', 84'	Report	Lassiter 7'

Columbus Crew Stadium, Columbus, Ohio
Attendance: 12,778
Referee: Brian Hall
November 13, 1999
Game 3

D.C. United	4–0	Columbus Crew
Moreno 17'; Lassiter 34', 52'; Etcheverry 86'	Report

RFK Stadium, Washington, D.C.
Attendance: 21,451
Referee: Ricardo Valenzuela
- D.C. United advance 2–1, advance to MLS Cup '99.

October 31, 1999
Game 1

Los Angeles Galaxy	2–1	Dallas Burn
Cienfuegos 39'; Hendrickson 90'	Report	Graziani 75'

Rose Bowl, Pasadena, California
Attendance: 17,372
Referee: Noel Kenny
November 7, 1999
Game 2

Dallas Burn	2–2	Los Angeles Galaxy
Graziani 33', 73'	Report	Hermosillo 12', 54'
Penalties
Santel (penalty missed); Tréllez (penalty scored); Farrer (penalty missed); Daniv (penalty missed); Rodríguez (penalty scored); Pareja (penalty scored); Graziani (penalty scored)	4–3	(penalty scored) Jones; (penalty missed) Cienfuegos; (penalty missed) Vanney; (penalty missed) Hendrickson; (penalty scored) Hermosillo; (penalty scored) Caligiuri; (penalty missed) Pena

Cotton Bowl, Dallas, Texas
Attendance: 13,816
Referee: Ricardo Valenzuela
November 11, 1999
Game 3

Los Angeles Galaxy	3–1	Dallas Burn
Vanney 3' (pen.); Hermosillo 20'; Cienfuegos 68'	Report	Kreis 89' (pen.)

Rose Bowl, Pasadena, California
Attendance: 25,703
Referee: Brian Hall
- Los Angeles Galaxy advance 2–1. advance to MLS Cup '99.

=== MLS Cup ===
November 21, 1999

Los Angeles Galaxy	0–2	D.C. United
	Report	Moreno 19'; Olsen 45+3'

Foxboro Stadium, Foxborough, Massachusetts
Attendance: 44,910
Referee: Tim Weyland

== Player statistics ==
=== Goals ===
Rank	Player	Club	Goals
1	(Trinidad and Tobago) Stern John	Columbus Crew	18
1	(United States) Roy Lassiter	D.C. United	18
1	(United States) Jason Kreis	Dallas Burn	18
4	(United States) Joe-Max Moore	New England Revolution	15
4	(El Salvador) Ronald Cerritos	San Jose Clash	15
6	(United States) Ante Razov	Chicago Fire	14
7	(El Salvador) Raúl Díaz Arce	San Jose Clash, Tampa Bay Mutiny	13
8	(Liberia) Musa Shannon	Tampa Bay Mutiny	12
8	(United States) Jeff Cunningham	Columbus Crew	12
10	5 players		10

=== Hat-tricks ===
Player	Club	Against	Result	Date
(United States) Jason Kreis	Dallas Burn	New England Revolution	4–0	March 20
(Trinidad and Tobago) Stern John	Columbus Crew	Miami Fusion	4–0	August 1
(Trinidad and Tobago) Stern John	Columbus Crew	MetroStars	4–2	August 18

=== Assists ===
Rank	Player	Club	Assists
1	(Bolivia) Marco Etcheverry	D.C. United	13
1	(Colombia) Carlos Valderrama	Tampa Bay Mutiny	13
3	(United States) Steve Ralston	Tampa Bay Mutiny	12
4	(United States) Ben Olsen	D.C. United	11
5	(United States) Jeff Baicher	San Jose Clash	9
5	(El Salvador) Mauricio Cienfuegos	Los Angeles Galaxy	9
5	(Poland) Roman Kosecki	Chicago Fire	9
5	(United States) Eddie Lewis	San Jose Clash	9
9	(United States) Henry Gutierrez	Miami Fusion	8
9	(United States) Jason Kreis	Dallas Burn	8
9	(United States) Brian McBride	Columbus Crew	8

=== Clean sheets ===
Rank	Player	Club	Clean sheets
1	(United States) Kevin Hartman	Los Angeles Galaxy	11
1	(United States) Matt Jordan	Dallas Burn	11
3	(United States) Ian Feuer	Colorado Rapids	8
4	(United States) Zach Thornton	Chicago Fire	7
5	(United States) Mark Dougherty	Columbus Crew	6
6	(United States) Scott Garlick	Tampa Bay Mutiny	5
7	(United States) Joe Cannon	San Jose Clash	4
7	(United States) Marcus Hahnemann	Colorado Rapids	4
9	(United States) Jeff Cassar	Miami Fusion	3
9	(United States) Garth Lagerway	Miami Fusion	3
9	(United States) Tony Meola	Kansas City Wizards	3
9	(United States) Tom Presthus	D.C. United	3

== Awards ==
=== Individual awards ===
Award	Player	Team
Most Valuable Player	(United States) Jason Kreis	Dallas Burn
Defender of the Year	(United States) Robin Fraser	Los Angeles Galaxy
Goalkeeper of the Year	(United States) Kevin Hartman	Los Angeles Galaxy
Coach of the Year	(United States) Sigi Schmid	Los Angeles Galaxy
Rookie of the Year	(United States) Jay Heaps	Miami Fusion
Scoring Champion	(United States) Jason Kreis	Dallas Burn
Goal of the Year	(Bolivia) Marco Etcheverry	D.C. United
Fair Play Award	(United States) Steve Ralston	Tampa Bay Mutiny

=== Best XI ===
Goalkeeper	Defenders	Midfielders	Forwards
(United States) Kevin Hartman, LA Galaxy	(United States) Jeff Agoos, D.C. United (Czech Republic) Luboš Kubík, Chicago (United States) Robin Fraser, LA Galaxy	(United States) Chris Armas, Chicago (El Salvador) Mauricio Cienfuegos, LA Galaxy (Bolivia) Marco Etcheverry, D.C. United (United States) Eddie Lewis, San Jose (United States) Steve Ralston, Tampa Bay	(United States) Jason Kreis, Dallas (Bolivia) Jaime Moreno, D.C. United

=== Player of the Month ===
Week	Player	Club
March	(United States) Ante Razov	Chicago Fire
April	(Liberia) Musa Shannon	Tampa Bay Mutiny
May	(United States) Roy Lassiter	D.C. United
June	(United States) Jason Kreis	Dallas Burn
July	(El Salvador) Raúl Díaz Arce	Tampa Bay Mutiny
August	(United States) Matt Jordan	Dallas Burn
September	(El Salvador) Ronald Cerritos	San Jose Clash

=== Weekly awards ===
Player of the Week
Week	Player	Club
Week 1	(United States) Jason Kreis	Dallas Burn
Week 2	(United States) Ante Razov	Chicago Fire
Week 3	(United States) Ante Razov	Chicago Fire
Week 4	(United States) Matt Jordan	Dallas Burn
Week 5	(United States) Jason Kreis	Dallas Burn
Week 6	(South Africa) Ivan McKinley	New England Revolution
Week 7	(United States) Jeff Cunningham	Columbus Crew
Week 8	(United States) Mark Chung	MetroStars
Week 9	(United States) Roy Lassiter	D.C. United
Week 10	(Venezuela) Giovanni Savarese	New England Revolution
Week 11	(United States) Jason Kreis	Dallas Burn
Week 12	(Bolivia) Jaime Moreno	D.C. United
Week 13	(United States) Joe-Max Moore	New England Revolution
Week 14	(Panama) Jorge Dely Valdés	Colorado
Week 15	(Trinidad and Tobago) Stern John	Columbus Crew
Week 16	(United States) Jason Kreis	Dallas Burn
Week 17	(United States) Chris Klein	Kansas City Wizards
Week 18	(El Salvador) Raúl Díaz Arce	Tampa Bay Mutiny
Week 19	(Czech Republic) Luboš Kubík	Chicago Fire
Week 20	(Ecuador) Ariel Graziani	Dallas Burn
Week 21	(United States) Ben Olsen	D.C. United
Week 22	(United States) Manny Lagos	Tampa Bay Mutiny
Week 23	(Venezuela) Giovanni Savarese	New England Revolution
Week 24	(United States) Eddie Lewis	San Jose Clash
Week 25	(United States) Brian McBride	Columbus Crew
Week 26	(United States) Jason Kreis	Dallas Burn
Week 27	(United States) Jason Kreis	Dallas Burn

== Attendance ==
Rank	Team	GP	Cumulative	High	Low	Mean
1	Columbus Crew	16	283,129	24,741	13,891	17,696
2	Los Angeles Galaxy	16	282,113	60,433	4,825	17,632
3	D.C. United	16	278,711	35,167	10,846	17,419
4	New England Revolution	16	267,752	30,564	7,260	16,735
5	Chicago Fire	16	256,261	27,311	6,223	16,016
6	San Jose Clash	16	239,350	73,123	6,824	14,812
7	MetroStars	16	235,301	43,192	6,876	14,706
8	Colorado Rapids	16	224,459	51,025	4,746	14,029
9	Tampa Bay Mutiny	16	209,700	20,976	8,264	13,106
10	Dallas Burn	16	195,387	17,621	7,237	12,212
11	Miami Fusion	16	139,021	13,648	5,862	8,689
12	Kansas City Wizards	16	130,924	15,509	4,631	8,183
Total		192	2,742,108	73,123	4,631	14,282
