= Dade =

Dade may refer to:

- Dade (surname)
- Dade City, Florida
- Miami-Dade County, Florida
- Dade isometry
- Dade's conjecture

== Historical eras ==
- Dade (1135–1139), era name used by Emperor Chongzong of Western Xia
- Dade (1297–1307), era name used by Temür Khan, emperor of the Yuan dynasty

== See also ==
- Dade County (disambiguation)
