= 2002 Dallas Burn season =

Dallas Burn
2002 season
- Owner: Major League Soccer
- Head coach: Mike Jeffries
- Stadium: Cotton Bowl
- MLS: Conference: 3rd Overall: 3rd
- MLS Cup: Lost Western Conference Semifinals vs. Colorado Rapids (1–2)
- U.S. Open Cup: Lost Semifinal vs. Los Angeles Galaxy (1–4)
- Brimstone Cup: Won Championship vs. Chicago Fire (2–0)
- Average home league attendance: 13,122
Home colors	Away colors	Third colors

The 2002 Dallas Burn season was the seventh season of the Major League Soccer team. The team made the playoffs for the seventh consecutive year.

== Final standings ==
Pos	Team	Pld	W	L	T	GF	GA	GD	Pts	Qualification
1	Los Angeles Galaxy	28	16	9	3	44	33	+11	51	MLS Cup Playoffs
2	San Jose Earthquakes	28	14	11	3	45	35	+10	45	MLS Cup Playoffs
3	Dallas Burn	28	12	9	7	44	43	+1	43	MLS Cup Playoffs
4	Colorado Rapids	28	13	11	4	43	48	−5	43	MLS Cup Playoffs
5	Kansas City Wizards	28	9	10	9	37	45	−8	36	MLS Cup Playoffs

Source: MLS

== Regular season ==
March 23, 2002 1	San Jose Earthquakes	2–0	Dallas Burn	Dallas, Texas
				Stadium: Cotton Bowl

April 6, 2002 2	D.C. United	1–2	Dallas Burn	Dallas, Texas
				Stadium: Cotton Bowl

April 13, 2002 3	Dallas Burn	1–1 (OT)	Los Angeles Galaxy	Pasadena, California
				Stadium: Rose Bowl

April 20, 2002 4	Los Angeles Galaxy	1–1 (OT)	Dallas Burn	Dallas, Texas
				Stadium: Cotton Bowl

April 27, 2002 5	Kansas City Wizards	1–1 (OT)	Dallas Burn	Dallas, Texas
				Stadium: Cotton Bowl

May 4, 2002 6	Dallas Burn	2–1	MetroStars	East Rutherford, New Jersey
				Stadium: Giants Stadium

May 11, 2002 7	Dallas Burn	0–2	New England Revolution	Foxboro, Massachusetts
				Stadium: CMGI Field

May 18, 2002 8	Colorado Rapids	1–3	Dallas Burn	Dallas, Texas
				Stadium: Cotton Bowl

May 25, 2002 9	Dallas Burn	1–1 (OT)	Columbus Crew	Columbus, Ohio
				Stadium: Crew Stadium

June 1, 2002 10	Dallas Burn	2–2 (OT)	Kansas City Wizards	Kansas City, Missouri
				Stadium: Arrowhead Stadium

June 8, 2002 11	Colorado Rapids	1–4	Dallas Burn	Dallas, Texas
				Stadium: Cotton Bowl

June 15, 2002 12	Dallas Burn	3–1	Chicago Fire	Naperville, Illinois
				Stadium: Cardinal Stadium

June 22, 2002 13	Dallas Burn	0–3	Los Angeles Galaxy	Pasadena, California
				Stadium: Rose Bowl

June 29, 2002 14	Columbus Crew	0–1 (OT)	Dallas Burn	Dallas, Texas
				Stadium: Cotton Bowl

July 4, 2002 15	MetroStars	0–2	Dallas Burn	Dallas, Texas
				Stadium: Cotton Bowl

July 6, 2002 16	Dallas Burn	1–1 (OT)	Kansas City Wizards	Kansas City, Missouri
				Stadium: Arrowhead Stadium

July 13, 2002 17	San Jose Earthquakes	1–2	Dallas Burn	Dallas, Texas
				Stadium: Cotton Bowl

July 20, 2002 18	Dallas Burn	0–4	San Jose Earthquakes	San Jose, California
				Stadium: Spartan Stadium

July 27, 2002 19	Dallas Burn	2–2 (OT)	Colorado Rapids	Denver, Colorado
				Stadium: Invesco Field

July 31, 2002 20	Kansas City Wizards	1–0	Dallas Burn	Dallas, Texas
				Stadium: Cotton Bowl

August 10, 2002 21	Chicago Fire	1–3	Dallas Burn	Dallas, Texas
				Stadium: Cotton Bowl

August 17, 2002 22	Dallas Burn	3–1	MetroStars	East Rutherford, New Jersey
				Stadium: Giants Stadium

August 21, 2002 23	Dallas Burn	1–3	San Jose Earthquakes	San Jose, California
				Stadium: Spartan Stadium

August 24, 2002 24	Los Angeles Galaxy	0–1 (OT)	Dallas Burn	Dallas, Texas
				Stadium: Cotton Bowl

September 1, 2002 25	Dallas Burn	2–3	Colorado Rapids	Denver, Colorado
				Stadium: Invesco Field

September 5, 2002 26	MetroStars	3–1	Dallas Burn	Dallas, Texas
				Stadium: Cotton Bowl

September 14, 2002 27	New England Revolution	2–1	Dallas Burn	Dallas, Texas
				Stadium: Cotton Bowl

September 19, 2002 28	Dallas Burn	4–3 (OT)	D.C. United	Washington, D.C.
				Stadium: RFK Stadium

== Playoffs ==
=== Western Conference semifinals ===
September 25, 2002 Game 1	Colorado Rapids	2–4	Dallas Burn	Dallas, Texas
7:30 PM CDT	Valderrama 2'; Mastroeni (yellow card) 18'; Henderson (yellow card) 67'; Spencer 75' (pen.); Fraser (yellow card) 86'	Report at the Wayback Machine (archived October 4, 2002)	Morrow 26'; Suarez (yellow card) 36'; Kreis 49' (yellow card) 54'; Broome (yellow card) 54'; Deering 68'; Martínez 70'	Stadium: Cotton Bowl; Attendance: 6,360; Referee: Alex Prus; Assistant referees: Robert Fereday; Steven Davidson

September 28, 2002 Game 2	Dallas Burn	0–1	Colorado Rapids	Denver, Colorado
7:00 PM MDT	Broome (yellow card) 39'; Bonseu (yellow card) 41'	Report at the Wayback Machine (archived October 4, 2002)	Valderrama (yellow card) 19'; Fraser (yellow card) 32'; Carrieri 78'	Stadium: Invesco Field; Attendance: 9,637; Referee: Rich Grady; Assistant referees: Greg Barkey; Richard Eddy

October 2, 2002 Game 3	Colorado Rapids	1–1 (OT)	Dallas Burn	Dallas, Texas
7:30 PM CDT	Spencer 22' (yellow card) 57'; Carrieri (yellow card) 39'	Report at the Wayback Machine (archived December 18, 2002)	Rhine 6'; Kreis (yellow card) 7'; Deering (yellow card) 51'; Bonseu (yellow card) 65'	Stadium: Cotton Bowl; Attendance: 8,008; Referee: Terry Vaughn; Assistant referees: Jose Andrade; Kermit Quisenberry

October 2, 2002 Tiebreaker	Colorado Rapids	1–0	Dallas Burn	Dallas, Texas
	Chung 1'			Stadium: Cotton Bowl; Attendance: 8,008; Referee: Terry Vaughn

== U.S. Open Cup ==
July 17, 2002 Third Round	Dallas Burn (Texas)	2–1 (OT)	(Georgia (U.S. state)) Atlanta Silverbacks	Clarkston, Georgia
	Martinez 82' 102'		Iotov 18'	Stadium: DeKalb Memorial Stadium

August 7, 2002 Quarterfinal	Colorado Rapids	0–1 (OT)	(Texas) Dallas Burn	Dallas, Texas
			O’Brien 111'	Stadium: Cotton Bowl; Attendance: 1,301

September 3, 2002 Semifinal	Dallas Burn (Texas)	1–4	(California) Los Angeles Galaxy	Fullerton, California
	Cerritos 89'		Ruiz 11'; Cienfuegos 17'; Jones 34'; Elliot 81'	Stadium: Titan Stadium; Attendance: 3,132
