= 2002 MLS All-Star Game =

Soccer game played in Washington, D.C.

Pepsi MLS All-Star Game 2002
- Event: 2002 Major League Soccer season
MLS All-Stars	United States
(United States)	(United States)
3	2
- Date: August 3, 2002
- Venue: RFK Stadium, Washington, D.C.
- Man of the Match: Marco Etcheverry (D.C. United)
- Referee: Brian Hall
- Attendance: 31,096
- Weather: Showers

The 2002 Major League Soccer All-Star Game was the 7th edition of the Major League Soccer All-Star Game, played on August 3, 2002 at RFK Memorial Stadium in Washington, D.C. The match was contested by the MLS All-Stars team and the United States on the invitation of MLS, who looked to capitalize on their success at the 2002 FIFA World Cup. Bruce Arena assembled a roster of the national team's most prominent domestic players in the last decade in place of the European-based players from the 2002 World Cup roster to rest them; then-San Jose Earthquakes head coach Frank Yallop formed an All-Star team of the top talent among the league's remaining players.

== The match ==
=== Summary ===
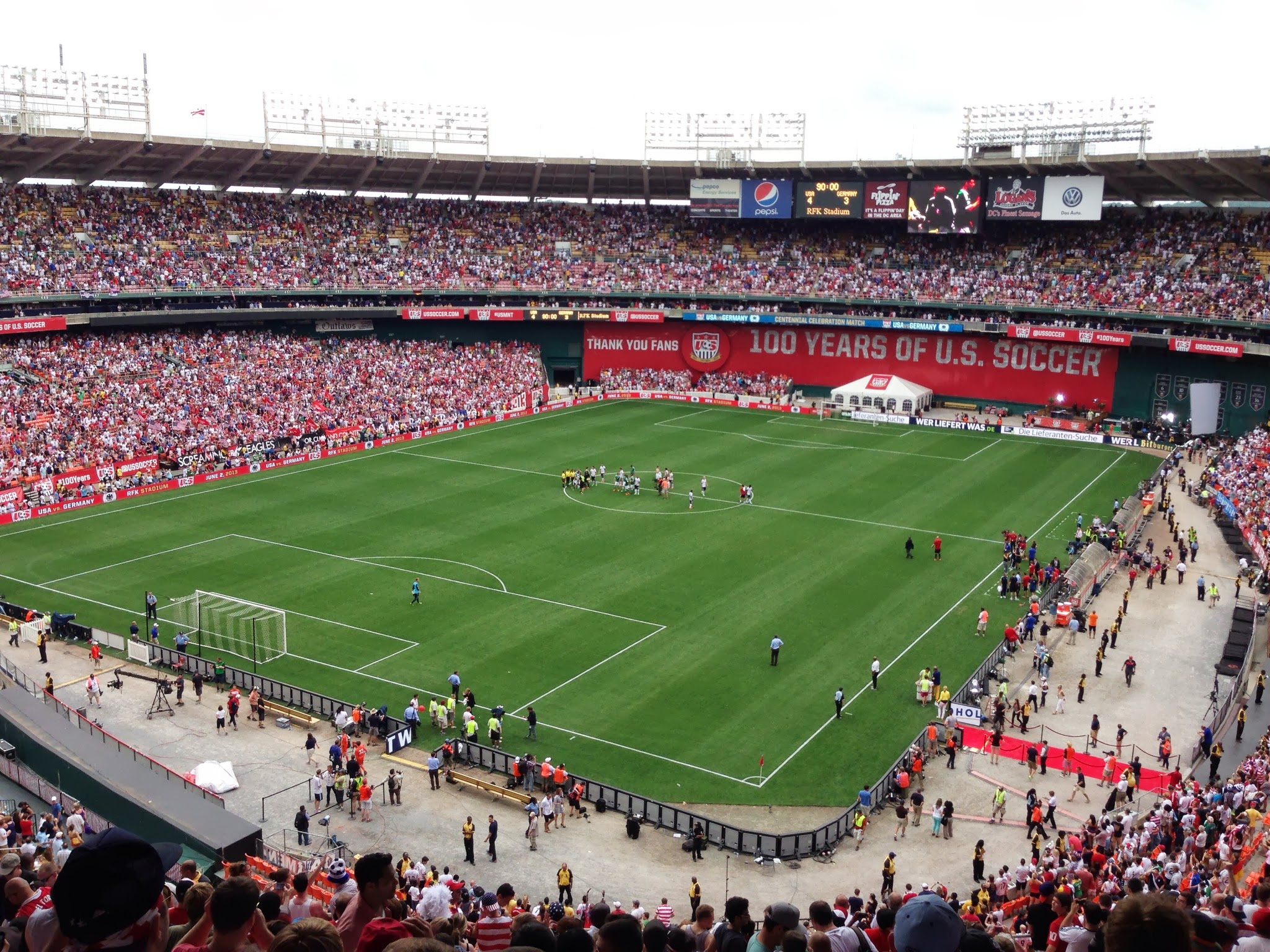
RFK Stadium hosted the match

Despite bad weather leading to a rain delay in the first half, the game saw a flurry of goals toward its conclusion. U.S. standout and San Jose Earthquakes' forward Landon Donovan opened the scoring for the national team, while the Dallas Burn's Jason Kreis responded with the equalizer in the following minute.

D.C. United midfielder and MVP Marco Etcheverry gave the All-Stars the lead with help from fellow Bolivian Joselito Vaca. The Los Angeles Galaxy's Cobi Jones tied the game on a Brian McBride cross, but the New England Revolution's Steve Ralston scored late in the second half to give MLS the All-Star Game win.

=== Details ===
2002 MLS All-Star Game
August 3, 2002

MLS All-Stars (United States)	3–2	United States
Kreis 59'; Etcheverry 72'; Ralston 81'	Report	Donovan 58'; Jones 76'

RFK Stadium, Washington, D.C.
Attendance: 31,096
Referee: Brian Hall

MLS All-Stars
United States

GK	18	(United States) Tim Howard	(substituted off) 46 '
DF	3	(United States) Ryan Suarez	(substituted off) 18 '
DF	12	(United States) Mike Petke	(substituted off) 46 '	(substituted in) 70 '
DF	4	(United States) Carlos Bocanegra			(substituted off) 78 '
MF	14	(United States) Steve Ralston	(substituted off) 46 '	(substituted in) 70 '
MF	8	(United States) Richard Mulrooney		(substituted off) 70 '	(substituted in) 78 '
MF	10	(Colombia) Carlos Valderrama(c)		(substituted off) 70 '
MF	21	(Ukraine) Dema Kovalenko	(substituted off) 46 '	(substituted in) 70 '
MF	20	(United States) Mark Chung		(substituted off) 70 '
FW	33	(United States) Taylor Twellman	(substituted off) 46 '
FW	15	(Guatemala) Carlos Ruiz	(substituted off) 46 '
Substitutes:
GK	1	(United States) Joe Cannon	(substituted in) 46 '
DF	24	(United States) Wade Barrett	(substituted in) 18 '
MF		(United States) Chris Klein	(substituted in) 46 '
MF		(Bolivia) Joselito Vaca	(substituted in) 46 '
MF	11	(Bolivia) Marco Etcheverry	(substituted in) 46 '
FW	7	(Ecuador) Ariel Graziani	(substituted in) 46 '
FW	9	(United States) Jason Kreis	(substituted in) 46 '
Manager:
(Canada) Frank Yallop

GK	1	(United States) Tony Meola	(substituted off) 46 '
DF	23	(United States) Eddie Pope	(substituted off) 46 '
DF	16	(United States) Carlos Llamosa	(substituted off) 46 '
DF	12	(United States) Jeff Agoos	(substituted off) 46 '
MF	13	(United States) Cobi Jones(c)
MF	10	(United States) Brian Maisonneuve
DF	25	(United States) Pablo Mastroeni
MF	9	(United States) Preki	(substituted off) 46 '
MF	7	(United States) DaMarcus Beasley
FW	21	(United States) Landon Donovan
FW	20	(United States) Brian McBride
Substitutes:
GK	18	(United States) Juergen Sommer	(substituted in) 46 '
DF	22	(United States) Alexi Lalas	(substituted in) 46 '
DF		(United States) Mike Burns	(substituted in) 46'
MF	19	(United States) Chris Henderson	(substituted in) 46 '
MF		(United States) Chad Deering	(substituted in) 46'
MF		(United States) John Harkes
FW		(United States) Josh Wolff
Manager:
(United States) Bruce Arena

MLS All-Star MVP:
(United States) Marco Etcheverry (MLS All-Stars)
Assistant referees:
Nathan Clement
Craig Lowry
Fourth official:

Match rules

- 90 minutes.
- Unlimited substitutions.
- No extra time.
- Penalty shoot-out if scores still level.
