= Special abelian subgroup =

In mathematical group theory, a subgroup of a group is termed a special abelian subgroup or SA-subgroup if the centralizer of any nonidentity element in the subgroup is precisely the subgroup(Curtis & Reiner 1981, p.354). Equivalently, an SA subgroup is a centrally closed abelian subgroup.

- Any SA subgroup is a maximal abelian subgroup, that is, it is not properly contained in another abelian subgroup.
- For a CA group, the SA subgroups are precisely the maximal abelian subgroups.

SA subgroups are known for certain characters associated with them termed exceptional characters.
