= Dade (surname) =

Dade is a surname. Notable people with the surname include:

- Alexander L. Dade (1863–1927), American military officer
- Eric Dade (born 1970), American soccer player and coach
- Everett C. Dade, mathematician
- Francis L. Dade (died 1835), Major in the United States Army during the Seminole Wars
- Harold Dade (1923–1962), American boxer
- OMB Peezy (born as LeParis Dade in 1997), American rapper
- Paul Dade (1951–2016), Major League Baseball player
- Stephen Dade (1909–1975), English cinematographer
