= Exceptional character =

In mathematical finite group theory, an exceptional character of a group is a character related in a certain way to a character of a subgroup. They were introduced by Suzuki (1955, p. 663), based on ideas due to Brauer in (Brauer & Nesbitt 1941).

== Definition ==
Suppose that H is a subgroup of a finite group G, and C_{1}, ..., C_{r} are some conjugacy classes of H, and φ_{1}, ..., φ_{s} are some irreducible characters of H. Suppose also that they satisfy the following conditions:

1. s ≥ 2
2. φ_{i} = φ_{j} outside the classes C_{1}, ..., C_{r}
3. φ_{i} vanishes on any element of H that is conjugate in G but not in H to an element of one of the classes C_{1}, ..., C_{r}
4. If elements of two classes are conjugate in G then they are conjugate in H
5. The centralizer in G of any element of one of the classes C_{1},...,C_{r} is contained in H

Then G has s irreducible characters s_{1},...,s_{s}, called exceptional characters, such that the induced characters φ_{i}* are given by

φ_{i}* = εs_{i} + a(s_{1} + ... + s_{s}) + Δ

where ε is 1 or −1, a is an integer with a ≥ 0, a + ε ≥ 0, and Δ is a character of G not containing any character s_{i}.

== Construction ==
The conditions on H and C_{1},...,C_{r} imply that induction is an isometry from generalized characters of H with support on C_{1},...,C_{r} to generalized characters of G. In particular if i≠j then (φ_{i} − φ_{j})* has norm 2, so is the difference of two characters of G, which are the exceptional characters corresponding to φ_{i} and φ_{j}.

== See also ==
- Dade isometry
- Coherent set of characters
