= Centrally closed subgroup =

In mathematics, in the realm of group theory, a subgroup of a group is said to be centrally closed (commonly abbreviated as CC-subgroup) if the centralizer of any non identity element of the subgroup lies inside the subgroup. Some facts about centrally closed subgroups:

- Every malnormal subgroup is centrally closed.
- Every Frobenius kernel is centrally closed.
- SA subgroups are precisely the centrally closed Abelian subgroups.
- The trivial subgroup and the whole group are centrally closed
