= Dade County =

Dade County can refer to the following places:

- Miami-Dade County, Florida, in the southeastern part of the state
- Dade County, Georgia, the state's northwesternmost, bordering Alabama and Tennessee
- Dade County, Missouri, in the southwestern part of the state
