= Jason Kreis =

American soccer player and coach

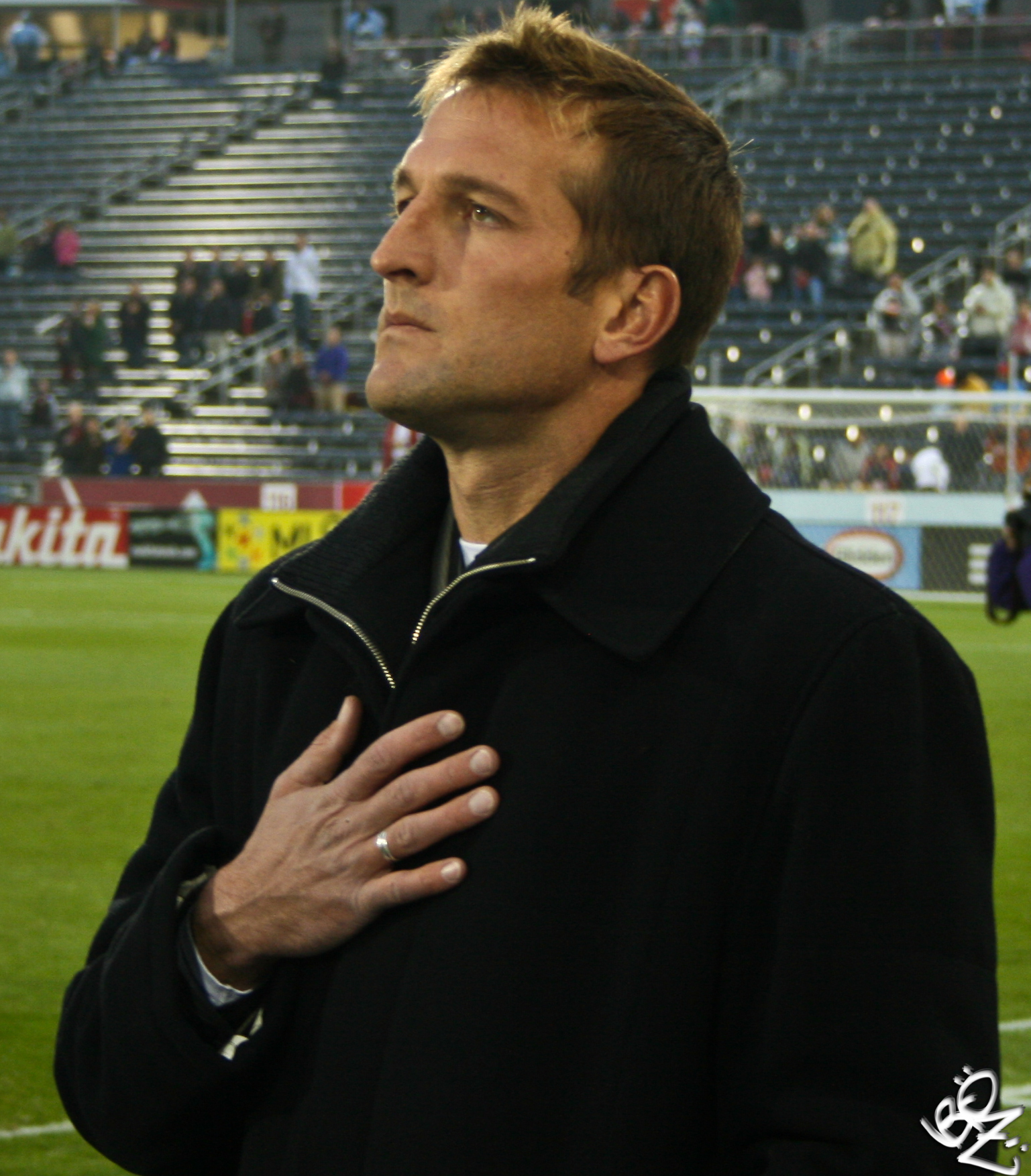
- Kreis as head coach of Real Salt Lake

Personal information
- Full name: Jason Clarence Kreis
- Date of birth: December 29, 1972 (age 53)
- Place of birth: Omaha, Nebraska, United States
- Height: 5 ft 8 in (1.73 m)
- Positions: Midfielder; forward

College career
Years	Team	Apps	(Gls)
1991–1994	Duke Blue Devils		

Senior career*
Years	Team	Apps	(Gls)
1993	Raleigh Flyers		
1994	New Orleans Storm		
1995	Raleigh Flyers		(10)
1996–2004	Dallas Burn	247	(91)
2005–2007	Real Salt Lake	58	(17)
Total		305	(108)

International career
1996–2000	United States	14	(1)

Managerial career
- 2007–2013: Real Salt Lake
- 2013–2015: New York City FC
- 2016–2018: Orlando City
- 2019–2021: United States U23
- 2020: Fort Lauderdale
- 2021–2023: Inter Miami (assistant)
- * Club domestic league appearances and goals

Jason Clarence Kreis (born December 29, 1972) is an American soccer coach and former player who is the director of operations and special projects for Major League Soccer side Real Salt Lake and the former head coach of the United States under-23 team. From 2021 to 2023, he also served as an assistant coach for MLS club Inter Miami. He coached Orlando City SC in Major League Soccer and was previously an assistant coach under Jürgen Klinsmann for the United States men's national soccer team. Prior to that he was the head coach of New York City FC and Real Salt Lake.

Kreis spent the majority of his playing career in Major League Soccer in the United States, initially with the Dallas Burn, and later with Real Salt Lake. In total he made over 300 professional appearances, was Major League Soccer MVP in 1999, and is currently tied for the fifth highest scorer in MLS regular season history, with 108 goals. He also earned fourteen international caps for the United States national team. At one point in his playing career, he was the all-time leading scorer in MLS history.

== Early life ==
Kreis played for the Gladiator Soccer Club in his hometown of Omaha, Nebraska, where his parents were among the pioneers who established this first premier/select club within the state. As a freshman at Burke High School in Omaha, Kreis was selected First Team All-State. He remains the only freshman selected to the first team. Following his freshman year, Kreis and his family moved to Mandeville, Louisiana, where he led Mandeville High School to several Class 5A state soccer tournaments, but never won a state title, losing to Lafayette High, led by stars Shammi Gupta and Wayne Shullaw, in the quarterfinals his senior year. While at Mandeville, he was also a standout performer for the Baton Rouge United Jags, a U-19 Select team that finished as national runner-up in 1991 and won the prestigious Capital Cup tournament in Washington, D.C.

He played collegiately at Duke University in Durham, North Carolina. A first team All-America pick in 1993 and 1994, Kreis finished his college career with 39 goals and 38 assists, ranking fifth all-time in scoring.

== Club career ==
=== Minor leagues ===
In 1993, Kreis played during the summer for the Raleigh Flyers of the USISL. In the summer of 1994, he returned to Louisiana to play for the New Orleans Riverboat Gamblers, also of the USISL. After finishing his collegiate eligibility in 1994, Kreis signed his first professional contract with the Raleigh Flyers in the spring of 1995.

=== Dallas Burn ===
On August 1, 1995, Kreis signed a contract with Major League Soccer as the league prepared for its inaugural season. Kreis was drafted forty-third overall by the Dallas Burn in the fifth round of the MLS Inaugural Draft. He scored the first goal in Burn history. In 1999, Kreis was the first American-born player to be named league MVP after he led the league in points and goals, and also registered the first 15-goal, 15-assist season in league history. The five-time all-star led his team in goals five times and in points four times.

On June 26, 2004, Kreis scored his eighty-ninth league goal against D.C. United, moving past Roy Lassiter to the top of the league's all-time goal-scoring chart. Kreis remained the MLS all time goalscoring leader for more than three years until Jaime Moreno surpassed his record on August 22, 2007. He ended his ninth MLS season with career totals of 91 goals and 65 assists for 247 points, plus added four goals and two assists in the playoffs. He remains Dallas' all-time leader in games played (247), goals (91), assists (65), and points (247).

=== Real Salt Lake ===
On November 17, 2004, Kreis was traded to expansion team Real Salt Lake, becoming the first player in the club's history. Kreis scored the first goal in Salt Lake's history in its second match, a 3–1 loss to the Los Angeles Galaxy. In doing so, he became the first player in league history to do so for two different teams, as he scored the inaugural goal for Dallas in 1996 as well.

On August 13, 2005, he became the first player in MLS history to score 100 career league goals, during a 4–2 loss to the Kansas City Wizards. The achievement was unexpected from observers, especially out of a 1996 class that included other candidates like Eric Wynalda, Brian McBride, or Joe-Max Moore; Kreis had never been considered a particularly dangerous goalscorer and had only lead the league in scoring once, in 1999.

Kreis was left unprotected in the 2006 MLS Expansion Draft by Real Salt Lake and subsequently chosen by Toronto FC. He was reacquired by Salt Lake on November 17, 2006, with the club sending partial allocation money to Toronto in exchange.

He retired as a player on May 3, 2007, to take over as head coach, finishing with 108 career goals. His number (9) was retired by Real Salt Lake in 2011 but was later restored for use by Kreis's request.

== International career ==
With only 14 international appearances, Kreis was never able to translate his club success into one with the U.S. national team. He received his first cap on August 30, 1996, against El Salvador at the Los Angeles Memorial Coliseum. Kreis scored his only international goal on September 8, 1999, in a 2–2 draw against Jamaica in Kingston.

=== International goals ===
No.	Date	Venue	Opponent	Score	Result	Competition	Ref.
1.	September 8, 1999	National Stadium, Kingston, Jamaica	Jamaica	1 – 0	2–2	Friendly	

== Coaching career ==
=== Real Salt Lake ===
On May 3, 2007, Kreis retired from professional competition and was announced as the new head coach of Real Salt Lake, retiring as a player and taking over the coaching reins from John Ellinger. At the time of his hire, Kreis became the youngest active head coach in MLS at 34 years and 127 days. He led Real Salt Lake to its first-post season playoff appearance in 2008 and in 2009 he coached the team to its first MLS Cup championship. Kreis is the youngest coach in MLS history to win the MLS Cup. Following the 2009 MLS Cup win, Kreis would lead Real Salt Lake to playoff appearances in every subsequent season through 2013, including an appearance in the 2013 MLS Cup, which RSL lost to Sporting Kansas City in dramatic fashion on penalty kicks. Kreis also guided Real Salt Lake to a very good CONCACAF Champions League campaign in 2011. Real Salt Lake won Group A and made it all the way to the 2011 CONCACAF Champions League Finals, only to lose to 3–2 on aggregate to C.F. Monterrey.

Real Salt Lake signed Kreis to a contract extension on March 24, 2011, that kept him at the RSL helm through the 2013 season, after which he left RSL to become head coach of New York City FC. Real Salt Lake originally retired Kreis' number 9 jersey from his playing days, but has since reinstated the number with his permission.

=== New York City ===
On December 11, 2013, Kreis was announced as the first head coach of New York City FC, having reached the end of his contract at Real Salt Lake and declining an extension offer from RSL so he could take the New York City FC position. The move came just four days after he missed out on lifting his second MLS Cup with the Utah team, losing on penalty kicks to Sporting Kansas City. It was revealed in the announcement that his contract, starting on January 1, 2014, would see him begin by traveling to Manchester in England to familiarize himself with the set-up of franchise-owners Manchester City.

Kreis' inaugural season with NYCFC ended in disappointment. The club finished with a 10–17–7 record in the regular season placing 8th in the Eastern Conference, failing to make the 2015 MLS Cup Playoffs. He and the club parted ways on November 2, 2015.

=== Orlando City ===
On July 19, 2016, Kreis was hired by Orlando City to replace outgoing inaugural coach Adrian Heath. At Orlando City, he reunited with two of his assistant coaches, Miles Joseph and C. J. Brown, and led the club to its first win in two months during his first game in charge.

On June 15, 2018, Kreis was released by Orlando City.

=== United States U-23 ===
On March 19, 2019, Kreis was named head coach of the United States men's national under-23 team.

=== Fort Lauderdale ===
On February 15, 2020, Kreis was hired by Inter Miami, to coach their USL League One affiliate Fort Lauderdale.

=== Inter Miami ===
On March 1, 2021, Inter Miami announced that Kreis was to become an assistant coach under Phil Neville. On June 1, 2023, the club announced that it had parted ways with Neville, with Kreis also relieved of his duties.

== Front office career ==
=== Real Salt Lake ===
Kreis's return to Real Salt Lake was announced on December 12, 2023. Kreis was appointed to a newly created position Director of Operations and Special Project reporting directly to John Kimball. In the hybrid role supporting both sporting and business aspects of the club, Kreis would support head coach, and sporting director, as well as improve club engagement with fans and corporate sponsors.

== Career statistics ==
=== Club ===
Club performance			League		Cup		Play-offs		Continental		Total		
Club	Season	League	Apps	Goals	Apps	Goals	Apps	Goals	Apps	Goals	Apps	Goals	
Dallas Burn	1996	MLS	31	13	0	0	2	1	–		33	14	
Dallas Burn	1997	MLS	32	8	2	0	4	1	–		38	9	
Dallas Burn	1998	MLS	30	9	2	0	2	1	–		34	10	
Dallas Burn	1999	MLS	32	18	1	1	6	1	–		39	20	
Dallas Burn	2000	MLS	27	11	3	1	2	0	–		32	12	
Dallas Burn	2001	MLS	25	7	1	0	3	0	–		29	7	
Dallas Burn	2002	MLS	27	13	3	0	3	1	–		33	14	
Dallas Burn	2003	MLS	18	7	1	0	–		–		19	7	
Dallas Burn	2004	MLS	25	5	1	0	–		–		26	5	
Dallas Burn	Total		247	91	14	2	22	5	–		283	98	
Real Salt Lake	2005	MLS	24	9	0	0	–		–		24	9	
Real Salt Lake	2006	MLS	30	8	0	0	–		–		30	8	
Real Salt Lake	2007	MLS	4	0	–		–		–		4	0	
Real Salt Lake	Total		58	17	0	0	0	–		–		58	17
Career total			305	108	14	2	22	5	–		341	115	

Source: MLS

== Coaching statistics ==
As of October 24, 2020

Coaching record by team and tenure
Team	Nat	From	To	Record								Ref
Team	Nat	From	To	G	W	D	L	GF	GA	GD	Win %	Ref
Real Salt Lake	(United States)	May 3, 2007	December 10, 2013	267	111	68	88	381	304	+77	41.57	
New York City FC	(United States)	December 11, 2013	November 2, 2015	35	10	8	17	51	60	−9	28.57	
Orlando City	(United States)	July 19, 2016	June 15, 2018	65	22	13	30	90	117	−27	33.85	
United States U23	(United States)	March 19, 2019	March 28, 2021	5	2	1	2	8	4	+4	40.00	
Fort Lauderdale	(United States)	February 15, 2020	February 28, 2021	16	4	3	9	19	28	−9	25.00	
Total				388	149	93	146	549	513	+36	38.40	—

== Honors ==
=== Player ===
Dallas Burn

- U.S. Open Cup: 1997

Individual

- MLS All-Star: 1996, 1999, 2000
- MLS MVP Award: 1999
- MLS Best XI: 1999

=== Coach ===
Real Salt Lake

- MLS Cup: 2009

== See also ==
- List of Major League Soccer coaches
