= Dade's conjecture =

In finite group theory, Dade's conjecture is a conjecture relating the numbers of characters of blocks of a finite group to the numbers of characters of blocks of local subgroups, introduced by Everett C. Dade.
