= Brandon Pollard =

American soccer player (born 1973)

Personal information
- Full name: Brandon Arlington Pollard
- Date of birth: October 9, 1973 (age 53)
- Place of birth: Richmond, Virginia, U.S.
- Height: 5 ft 11 in (1.80 m)
- Position: Defender

College career
Years	Team	Apps	(Gls)
1992–1995	Virginia Cavaliers		

Senior career*
Years	Team	Apps	(Gls)
1996–2000	Dallas Burn	114	(0)
2000	→ Tennessee Rhythm (loan)	1	(0)
2000	→ Texas Rattlers (loan)	3	(0)
- * Club domestic league appearances and goals

Brandon Pollard (born October 9, 1973) is an American retired soccer player who played as a defender. He is probably best known for having his career ended by a vicious tackle from Dema Kovalenko. Pollard was a standout player with the University of Virginia and was a member of the United States men's national soccer team at the 1996 Summer Olympics.

== Youth ==
Pollard grew up in Virginia where he attended J.R. Tucker High School. He was a four-time All Colonial District, and All State soccer player as well as a Parade Magazine All American as a senior.

After graduating from high school, Pollard attended the University of Virginia where he was a defender on the men's soccer team. While at Virginia, he was a member of the 1992, 1993, and 1994 NCAA championship teams. On an individual level, he was selected as second team All American in 1993 and a first team All American in 1994 and 1995, his junior and senior years.

== National teams ==
During Pollard's collegiate career, he also became a regular with various U.S. youth national teams. In 1993, he was of the World University Games soccer team. That year he also started all four games at the U-20 World Cup. In that tournament, the U.S. went 1-1-1 in the first round, making the second round only to fall eventual champions Brazil. In 1995, he was a member of the U.S. team at the Pan American Games.

== Professional ==
In 1996, the Dallas Burn selected Pollard in the first round (third overall) of the 1996 MLS College Draft. Pollard played only ten games with the Burn that season, largely because of time spent at the 1996 Summer Olympics. In 1997, Pollard worked himself into a regular player on the Burn back line and was protected in the 1997 MLS Expansion Draft. In 1998 and 1999, his career began to hit it stride as he played 29 games and 31 games (all starts) respectively. However, his career took a hit during the last few minutes of the Burn's playoff game with the Chicago Fire. In that game, Fire player Dema Kovalenko tackled Pollard, shattering his leg. Although Pollard came back for the 2000 season, even going on loan with the Tennessee Rhythm in the USL A-League for one game and the Texas Rattlers for three games, he never regained the form he had prior to the injury. He retired from playing professionally during the 2001 pre-season.
