= Everett C. Dade =

American mathematician

- Born: October 5, 1937; Dover, New Hampshire
- Died: April 8, 2026 (aged 88); Media, Pennsylvania
- Education: Harvard University, Princeton University
- Known for: Dade isometry, Dade conjecture
- Spouse: Catherine Doléans-Dade
- Scientific career
- Fields: Mathematics
- Workplaces: University of Illinois at Urbana–Champaign
- Thesis: Multiplicity and Monoidal Transformations (1960)
- Doctoral advisor: O. Timothy O'Meara

Everett Clarence Dade was a mathematician at University of Illinois at Urbana–Champaign working on finite groups and representation theory, who introduced the Dade isometry and Dade's conjecture. While an undergraduate at Harvard University, he became a Putnam Fellow twice, in 1955 and 1957.

== Work ==
The Dade isometry is an isometry from class functions on a subgroup H with support on a subset K of H to class functions on a group G (Collins 1990, 6.1). It was introduced by Dade (1964) as a generalization and simplification of an isometry used by Feit & Thompson (1963) in their proof of the odd order theorem, and was used by Peterfalvi (2000) in his revision of the character theory of the odd order theorem.

Dade's conjecture is a conjecture relating the numbers of characters of blocks of a finite group to the numbers of characters of blocks of local subgroups.
