= Ryan Suarez =

American soccer player (born 1977)

Personal information
- Date of birth: July 28, 1977 (age 49)
- Place of birth: Roseville, California, United States
- Height: 1.88 m (6 ft 2 in)
- Position: Defender

Youth career
- 1997–2000: San Jose State Spartans

Senior career*
Years	Team	Apps	(Gls)
2001–2003	Dallas Burn	56	(4)
2003–2004	Los Angeles Galaxy	29	(0)
2005	Chivas USA	15	(1)
2005	MetroStars	4	(0)
2006	Vancouver Whitecaps	11	(0)
2007	California Victory	6	(0)

International career^{‡}
2003	United States	1	(0)
- * Club domestic league appearances and goals as of 15:36, 11 January 2016 (UTC) ‡ National team caps and goals as of 15:36, 11 January 2016 (UTC)

Ryan Shepard Suarez (born July 28, 1977) is an American soccer former player, who last played in United Soccer Leagues for the California Victory.

== Early career ==
Born in Sacramento, Suarez graduated from Oakmont High School in nearby Roseville, California. Suarez played college soccer at San Jose State University from 1997 to 2000, and was named an NCAA All-American his senior season. He also played for the Silicon Valley Ambassadors in the Premier Development League.

== Professional career ==
Upon graduating, Suarez was drafted 7th overall by the Dallas Burn in the 2001 MLS SuperDraft. Suarez played very well in his debut season, starting 19 games while scoring 2 goals and 3 assists, and showing an attacking instinct and physicality that looked to make him very dangerous in Major League Soccer. Although Suarez played consistently in his second season, starting 24 games and recording a goal and 2 assists for the Burn, his lack of improvement troubled many. His third season brought a move to center back, which Suarez did not take happily to – in midseason, he was traded to the Los Angeles Galaxy with Paul Broome and Antonio Martínez in exchange for Ezra Hendrickson and Gavin Glinton. Suarez's time with the Galaxy was limited by injuries, playing only 3 games. In his fourth season, with Galaxy star defender Danny Califf out for much of the year, Suarez cemented a position in the Galaxy back line, registering 25 starts for the team, but not scoring a single point. Suarez's efforts earned him the respect of Galaxy supporters and even brought him the LA Riot Squad (LARS) Player of the Year Award. Chivas USA acquired Suarez before the 2005 season.

Chivas USA coach Hans Westerhof subbed Suarez out in the 28th minute during the team's June 25 loss to the Kansas City Wizards; Westerhof had wanted the defense to play forward, and Suarez was not complying. A heated exchange followed, and Suarez was waived by the club two days later. He was then claimed off waivers by the MetroStars. He was released in November 2005 after playing just 4 games for the team.

In 2006, Suarez signed with Vancouver, and helped the Caps win their first USL First Division Championship by beating the Rochester Raging Rhinos 3–0.

On May 17, 2007, Suarez signed with the California Victory.

== International ==
Upon his arrival in MLS, Suarez was touted as a prospect for the US national team's right back position. His lack of development and his move to center back, however, make it unlikely that he will see much time with the team. Although Suarez had the option of playing for Uruguay, he committed himself to the United States, playing his only cap on May 26, 2003, against Wales.

== Honors ==
- MLS All-Star (2002)
