= Dade isometry =

In mathematical finite group theory, the Dade isometry is an isometry from class function on a subgroup H with support on a subset K of H to class functions on a group G (Collins 1990, 6.1). It was introduced by Dade (1964) as a generalization and simplification of an isometry used by Feit & Thompson (1963) in their proof of the odd order theorem, and was used by Peterfalvi (2000) in his revision of the character theory of the odd order theorem.

== Definitions ==
Suppose that H is a subgroup of a finite group G, K is an invariant subset of H such that if two elements in K are conjugate in G, then they are conjugate in H, and π a set of primes containing all prime divisors of the orders of elements of K. The Dade lifting is a linear map f → f^{σ} from class functions f of H with support on K to class functions f^{σ} of G, which is defined as follows: f^{σ}(x) is f(k) if there is an element k ∈ K conjugate to the π-part of x, and 0 otherwise. The Dade lifting is an isometry if for each k ∈ K, the centralizer C_{G}(k) is the semidirect product of a normal Hall π' subgroup I(K) with C_{H}(k).

== Tamely embedded subsets in the Feit–Thompson proof ==
The Feit–Thompson proof of the odd-order theorem uses "tamely embedded subsets" and an isometry from class functions with support on a tamely embedded subset. If K_{1} is a tamely embedded subset, then the subset K consisting of K_{1} without the identity element 1 satisfies the conditions above, and in this case the isometry used by Feit and Thompson is the Dade isometry.
