= Mark Santel =

American soccer player and coach

Personal information
- Date of birth: July 5, 1968 (age 58)
- Place of birth: St. Louis, Missouri, United States
- Height: 5 ft 10 in (1.78 m)
- Position: Midfielder

Youth career
- Scott Gallagher
- 1987–1990: Saint Louis Billikens

Senior career*
Years	Team	Apps	(Gls)
1991–1992	St. Louis Storm (indoor)	38	(6)
1992–1995	Colorado Foxes		
1996–2000	Dallas Burn	148	(5)
2001	Kansas City Wizards	21	(1)

International career
	U.S. U-20	1987 Youth World Cup - Chile	
1988–1997	United States	13	(1)
- * Club domestic league appearances and goals

Mark Santel (born July 5, 1968, in St. Louis, Missouri) is a retired U.S. soccer midfielder who is currently an assistant coach for the Saint Louis Billikens. Santel played professionally in the Major Indoor Soccer League, American Professional Soccer League and Major Soccer League. He also earned eight caps with the U.S. national team between 1988 and 1997.

== Youth ==
Santel was born and raised in Saint Louis, Missouri. He played soccer from youth as a member of the renowned local club Scott Gallagher. He also attended Christian Brothers College High School where he played on the boys' soccer team, earning team MVP honors in 1985 as well as a NSCAA and Parade All- American. After graduating from high school, Santel attended Saint Louis University where he played on the men's soccer team. He was a 1989 Second Team and a 1988 and 1990 First Team All American.

== Professional ==
In 1991, the Wichita Wings of Major Indoor Soccer League (MISL) drafted Santel number 1 overall in the 1991 MSL Draft. However, he actually played the 1991–1992 season with the St. Louis Storm (MISL). In 1992, he began playing for the Colorado Foxes of the American Professional Soccer League (APSL) and would remain with the team through the 1995 season. He was a member of both the 1992 and 1993 APSL championship teams. As Major League Soccer (MLS) prepared for its first season, it signed dozens of players to league contracts. In order to ensure an initial equitable distribution of talent, the league allocated high-profile players to each team. As part of this process, MLS allocated Santel to the Dallas Burn. In both 1996 and 1997, Santel was elected to the MLS All Star team. On December 4, 2000, the Burn traded Santel to the Kansas City Wizards for a third round draft pick. He spent one season with the Wizards, playing twenty-one games before retiring at the end of the season.

== National team ==
In 1987, Santel was a member of the United States men's national under-20 soccer team at the 1987 FIFA World Youth Championship. Santel went on to earn thirteen caps, scoring one goal, with the senior U.S. national team between 1988 and 1997. His first game with the full national team came in a January 10, 1988 loss to Guatemala. He did not appear again with the national team until February 1, 1991. Then he played sporadically until his last game in 1997. His national team goal came in a November 14, 1993 shellacking of the Caymen Islands. Final score was 8–1.

== Post-playing career ==
In 2002, the Lou Fusz Soccer Club of St. Louis hired Santel as its girls' program director. He is the head coach of the boys' soccer team and the girls' soccer team at Barat Academy.

In December 2004, he was hired as the sales and marketing representative for Velocity Sports Performance, a sports training facility in Chesterfield, Missouri.

He is also the co-author of the children's book Soccer Dreamin'.

== Honors ==
Individual

- MLS All-Star: 1996, 1997
