= Ariel Graziani =

Ecuadorian footballer (born 1971)

Personal information
- Full name: Ariel José Graziani Lentini
- Birth name: Ariel José Graziani
- Date of birth: 7 June 1971 (age 55)
- Place of birth: Empalme Villa Constitución, Argentina
- Height: 1.82 m (5 ft 11 1/2 in)
- Position: Striker

Senior career*
| Years | Team | Apps | (Gls) |
| 1993 | Newell's Old Boys | 0 | (0) |
| 1993–1994 | Sport Boys | 33 | (9) |
| 1995 | Aucas | 30 | (19) |
| 1995 | Ciclista Lima | 10 | (5) |
| 1996–1997 | Emelec | 69 | (52) |
| 1997–1998 | Veracruz | 17 | (6) |
| 1998–1999 | Monarcas Morelia | 38 | (17) |
| 1998 | New England Revolution | 3 | (0) |
| 1999 | Dallas Burn | 8 | (4) |
| 1999 | Emelec | 5 | (0) |
| 2000–2001 | Dallas Burn | 48 | (26) |
| 2002 | San Jose Earthquakes | 28 | (14) |
| 2003 | Barcelona SC | 40 | (26) |
| 2004 | Lanús | 17 | (4) |
| 2005–2006 | LDU Quito | 49 | (27) |
| Total | | 395 | (209) |

International career
| 1997–2000 | Ecuador | 34 | (15) |

Managerial career
- 2010: Olmedo
- * Club domestic league appearances and goals

Ariel José Graziani Lentini (born 7 June 1971) is a former professional footballer who played as a striker. Born in Argentina, he played for the Ecuador national team. After retiring in Ecuador, he played amateur football, and he chose to play for Argentine fifth-level club Atlético Empalme.

== Club career ==
Graziani has been a top goalscorer for practically every team for which he has played. He made his professional debut in 1993 with Newell's Old Boys of Argentina, where he was a teammate with Diego Maradona until he transferred later that year to Sport Boys of the Peruvian First Division.

Graziani transferred to the Ecuadorian First Division to play for Aucas in 1995, and moved a year later to join Emelec. During his two years with the club, 1996 and 1997, he led the league in scoring (52 goals in 69 matches) while helping Emelec earn league titles. His standout play earned him a transfer to Morelia of the Mexican Primera División. Again, he was one of the top goalscorers for his club and the league.

=== Major League Soccer ===
In 1999, Ariel was acquired by Major League Soccer for a transfer fee of slightly less than $2 million, which at the time was the highest transfer fee ever paid by the league.

==== New England Revolution ====
On 26 July 1999, Graziani was allocated to New England Revolution. In New England, he would once again be playing with his former teammate Joe-Max Moore, with whom he had played at Emelec in 1997. The Revolution were able to add Graziani under their $1.7m salary budget due to the trade of midfielder Edwin Gorter to the Miami Fusion and the retirement of midfielder Richard Goulooze.

Graziani's arrival in New England was well-received by the media and Revolution front office. The Sun Chronicle referred to Grazini as the "highest paid and, perhaps, most prolific player to ever perform in Major League Soccer...". The Revolution had been targeting Graziani since 1998, looking for a high-profile allocation from the league who could help with marketing as well as on the field.

Revolution head coach Walter Zenga praised Graziani as a "great player", stating Graziani has "excelled as a goalscorer everywhere he has played. His addition gives us one of the most dangerous attacks in MLS.” Revolution General Manager Brian O'Donovan stated there was "absolutely no doubt in our minds as an organization that we want Ariel Graziani on this team" and added that Graziani "is a big-time player who will have a major impact on whatever team he goes to. We are celebrating the addition of a high-impact player in spite of our defensive weaknesses, which we can correct."

Graziani was immediately inserted into the lineup upon his arrival, making his Revolution debut (and first start) on July 31, 1999, a 4–1 loss to the Tampa Bay Mutiny. He made his home debut in a 2–1 loss to the San Jose Clash on August 12.

Graziani's home debut proved to be his final appearance in a Revolution jersey. Graziani played in only three matches for the club before he was traded to the Dallas Burn for Colombian international Leonel Álvarez on August 13. The trade was not well received, and was referred to as what may be the "most shortsighted move in MLS history."

==== Dallas Burn ====
Graziani immediately made an impact on the Burn, scoring his first goal in the 4th minute of his first appearance on August 18, in a 3–0 victory over the 1st-place Colorado Rapids. He would make eight total appearances (all starts) for the Burn in 1999, contributing four total goals and one assist, helping Dave Dir's side qualify for the playoffs for the fourth consecutive year.

Graziani continued his prolific play for the Burn in the following seasons, finishing as the Burn's leading scorer in both 2000 and 2001, with 15 goals and 11 goals respectively. He was named an All-Star in both seasons; representing the Western Conference in the 2000 MLS All-Star Game as a 46th-minute substitute, and scoring a 26th-minute goal for the West as a starter in the 2001 MLS All-Star Game.

==== San Jose Earthquakes ====
In the offseason, due to salary cap constraints, the Burn traded Graziani to the San Jose Earthquakes for Salvadoran international, and Quakes all-time leading goalscorer, Ronald Cerritos and a second-round pick in the 2002 MLS SuperDraft on February 8, 2002.

In the 2002 San Jose Earthquakes season, Graziani broke a record by scoring six game-winning goals on his way to leading the team with 14 goals and five assists. For the third consecutive year, Graziani received MLS All-Star honors, and represented MLS against the United States men's national soccer team in the 2002 MLS All-Star Game. while the team's leading goalscorer, Graziani failed to connect adequately with strike partner Landon Donovan. MLS loaned out the final year of his contract. A bidding war between Emelec and Barcelona SC ensued, where, in the end, Barcelona offered MLS more money.

=== Later career ===
In 2003, Graziani was the top scorer in Ecuador with Barcelona SC. He also scored what was voted the top goal in that year's Copa Libertadores against the eventual winners Boca Juniors. In 2004, he signed with Lanús in Argentina but only managed 4 goals in 17 games and eventually left the same year to return to Barcelona SC and scored 8 goals from 18 games. In 2005, Graziani signed for LDU Quito. He played there until December, 2006, when he officially retired. Nevertheless, in May 2007, he signed with Atlético Empalme, where he started his career. Empalme in 2007 played for Santa Fe Province in zone 9 of the Torneo del Interior C, a complex regional fifth-level tournament.

Nowadays, Graziani holds a political position in his country of birth, Argentina. He is the vice-mayor of a small town called Empalme Villa Constitución where he is trying to help the poorest people in his town.

== International career ==
Graziani was naturalized as an Ecuadorian citizen and represented the Ecuador national team on 34 occasions between 1997 and 2000.

== Career statistics ==
=== International ===
Appearances and goals by national team and year
| National team | Year | Apps | Goals |
|---|---|---|---|
| Ecuador | 1997 | 14 | 9 |
| Ecuador | 1998 | 1 | 0 |
| Ecuador | 1999 | 10 | 4 |
| Ecuador | 2000 | 9 | 2 |
| Total | | 34 | 15 |

Scores and results list Ecuador's goal tally first, score column indicates score after each Graziani goal.

List of international goals scored by Ariel Graziani
| No. | Date | Venue | Opponent | Score | Result | Competition | Ref. |
|---|---|---|---|---|---|---|---|
| 1 | 28 May 1997 | Estadio Cuscatlán, San Salvador, EL Salvador | El Salvador | 1–0 | 2–0 | Friendly | |
| 2 | 8 June 1997 | Estadio Olímpico Atahualpa, Quito, Ecuador | Chile | 1–0 | 1–1 | 1998 FIFA World Cup qualification | |
| 3 | 14 June 1997 | Estadio Félix Capriles, Cochabamba, Bolivia | Paraguay | 2–0 | 2–0 | 1997 Copa América | |
| 4 | 17 June 1997 | Estadio Félix Capriles, Cochabamba, Bolivia | Chile | 1–0 | 2–1 | 1997 Copa América | |
| 5 | 20 August 1997 | Estadio Olímpico Atahualpa, Quito, Ecuador | Paraguay | 2–1 | 2–1 | 1998 FIFA World Cup qualification | |
| 6 | 12 October 1997 | Estadio Monumental, Guayaquil, Ecuador | Bolivia | 1–0 | 1–0 | 1998 FIFA World Cup qualification | |
| 7 | 16 November 1997 | Estadio Domingo Burgueño, Maldonado, Uruguay | Uruguay | 1–0 | 3–5 | 1998 FIFA World Cup qualification | |
| 8 | 16 November 1997 | Estadio Domingo Burgueño, Maldonado, Uruguay | Uruguay | 2–4 | 3–5 | 1998 FIFA World Cup qualification | |
| 9 | 16 November 1997 | Estadio Domingo Burgueño, Maldonado, Uruguay | Uruguay | 3–5 | 3–5 | 1998 FIFA World Cup qualification | |
| 10 | 4 June 1999 | Commonwealth Stadium, Edmonton, Canada | Guatemala | 1–0 | 3–1 | 1999 Canada Cup | |
| 11 | 4 June 1999 | Commonwealth Stadium, Edmonton, Canada | Guatemala | 3–1 | 3–1 | 1999 Canada Cup | |
| 12 | 6 June 1999 | Commonwealth Stadium, Edmonton, Canada | Canada | 1–0 | 2–1 | 1999 Canada Cup | |
| 13 | 7 July 1999 | Estadio Feliciano Cáceres, Luqu, Paraguay | Colombia | 1–2 | 1–2 | 1999 Copa América | |
| 14 | 27 January 2000 | Estadio Olímpico Metropolitano, San Pedro Sula, Honduras | Honduras | 1–0 | 1–1 | Friendly | |
| 15 | 3 June 2000 | Estadio Defensores del Chaco, Asunción, Paraguay | Paraguay | 1–3 | 1–3 | 2002 FIFA World Cup qualification | |

== Honours ==
=== Club ===
- Club Sport Emelec
  - Serie A de Ecuador: 1996
- LDU Quito
  - Serie A de Ecuador: 2005

=== Nation ===
- Ecuador
  - Canada Cup: 1999

=== Individual ===
- MLS All-Star: 2000, 2001, 2002

== Achievements ==
Graziani has played in 33 games for the Ecuador national team during his career, scoring 15 goals for his adopted country. He became top scorer at the 1999 Canada Cup, scoring three goals in three matches.
