= Sergi Daniv =

Ukrainian soccer midfielder and coach

Personal information
- Date of birth: 2 October 1975 (age 51)
- Place of birth: Kalush, Ukrainian SSR, Soviet Union (now Ukraine)
- Height: 5 ft 7 in (1.70 m)
- Position: Midfielder

Youth career
- Karpaty Lviv

College career
Years	Team	Apps	(Gls)
1995–1998	Wake Forest Demon Deacons		

Senior career*
Years	Team	Apps	(Gls)
1991	Karpaty Kamianka-Buzka	1	(0)
1992–1993	Skala Stryi	31	(1)
1999–2000	Dallas Burn	31	(0)
2001–2002	Chicago Fire	22	(3)

Managerial career
- 2009–2010: UIC Flames (assistant)
- 2010–2012: Chicago United FC
- 2012–: Raiders FC
- * Club domestic league appearances and goals

Sergi Zenoviiovych Daniv (Note: Ukrainian: Сергій Зеновійович Данів, romanized: Serhii Zenoviiovych Daniv) (born October 2, 1975) is a soccer midfielder and coach. Daniv has spent most of his career in the United States.

Born in Kalush, Ukraine, Daniv spent his senior year of high school in Philadelphia where he completed his college admissions test. He attended Wake Forest University, where he was an All-American for the university's soccer team in 1995, 1996 and 1998. He was a U-14, U-15, and U-16 USSR National Soccer Team player before heading to Winston-Salem, N.C. to play for the Demon Deacons. In addition to his three All-America honors, Daniv was an All-ACC First Team pick in both 1996 and 1998 and an All-ACC Second Team selection as a freshman in 1995. He also garnered All-South Region accolades during those three seasons. He appeared in 45 matches for the Burn and the Fire from 1999 until 2004, making 37 starts along the way. Daniv helped the Burn advance to the 1999 MLS Western Conference Finals, a year in which he was a candidate for league Rookie of the Year honors, and had a 2001 campaign for the Fire in which he posted seven points in 14 matches.

Daniv joined John Trask's coaching staff at the UIC Flames men's soccer team in July 2009.
