= Richard Farrer =

South African soccer player

Rich Farrer
Personal information
- Date of birth: 9 April 1971 (age 55)
- Place of birth: Johannesburg, South Africa
- Height: 6 ft 0 in (1.83 m)
- Positions: Forward; defender

Youth career
- 1989: Colorado College
- 1990–1992: University of New Mexico

Senior career*
Years	Team	Apps	(Gls)
1990	Albuquerque Gunners		
1990–1991	→ New Mexico Roadrunners		
1991	→ New Mexico Chiles	?	(2)
1993	New Mexico Chiles		
1994	AmaZulu		
1995	New Mexico Chiles		
1996–2002	Dallas Burn	158	(6)
1997	→ New Orleans Riverboat Gamblers (loan)	3	(0)
- * Club domestic league appearances and goals

Richard Farrer (born 9 April 1971) is a South African former professional soccer player who spent five seasons in the USISL, half a season each in South Africa and England, and seven seasons with the Dallas Burn in Major League Soccer (MLS).

== Professional ==
During his college years, Farrer also played for the Albuquerque Gunners of the USISL. In the fall of 1990, the Gunners became the New Mexico Roadrunners before changing their name to the New Mexico Chiles in 1991. Farrer remained with the team through all these name changes. He returned to the Chiles in 1993. He played the first half of the 1994–1995 season with AmaZulu in the South Africa Premier Soccer League. He then tried out with Lincoln City F.C. of the English Third Division for the second half of the season but left England with an ankle injury without having signed a contract. After rehabilitating his injured ankle, he returned to the Chiles in 1995.

On 7 February 1996, the Dallas Burn selected Farrer in the 12th round (113th overall) in the 1996 MLS Inaugural Player Draft. In 1997, the Burn sent him on loan to the New Orleans Riverboat Gamblers for three games. He played seven seasons as a defender with the Burn, retiring from playing in the middle of the 2002 MLS season on 17 June 2002, to enter law school at the University of Texas at Austin. He graduated from law school in 2005.
