= Paul Broome =

American soccer player (born 1976)

Personal information
- Date of birth: June 6, 1976 (age 50)
- Place of birth: Dallas, Texas, U.S.
- Height: 5 ft 9 in (1.75 m)
- Position: Defender

College career
Years	Team	Apps	(Gls)
1995–1998	SMU Mustangs		

Senior career*
Years	Team	Apps	(Gls)
1999–2003	Dallas Burn	87	(2)
1999	→ Austin Lone Stars (loan)	1	(0)
1999	→ New Orleans Riverboat Gamblers (loan)	2	(0)
1999	→ MLS Pro 40 (loan)	3	(0)
2003–2005	Los Angeles Galaxy	29	(0)
2005–2006	Real Salt Lake	11	(0)
- * Club domestic league appearances and goals

Paul Broome (born June 6, 1976) is an American retired soccer defender who played eight seasons in Major League Soccer.

== Youth and college ==
Broome graduated from Lake Highlands High School in Dallas, Texas, where he was an All-State soccer and football player. He also played youth soccer with the Dallas Texans Soccer Club. He attended Southern Methodist University, playing as a midfielder and forward on the men's soccer team from 1995 to 1998. He graduated with a degree in business administration.

== Professional ==
Broome was drafted in the first round (12th overall) in the 1999 MLS College Draft by his hometown Dallas Burn. In 1999, Broome appeared in thirteen games, registering one goal and two assists. He saw an enlarged role in 2000, playing a utility role for the Burn in outside midfield and left back. He played in 20 games in 2000 and 22 games in 2001. During the 2000 MLS offseason, Broome trained with Tottenham Hotspur of the English Premier League.

In 2002, Broome started all twenty-five games he played as a left back, registering four assists. However, in 2003, Chris Gbandi returned from a long-term injury and replaced Broome at left back. Broome requested a trade. On July 23, 2003, the Burn traded Broome to the Los Angeles Galaxy along with Ryan Suarez and Antonio Martinez in exchange for Gavin Glinton and Ezra Hendrickson.

In 2003, Broome played as a left midfielder and back for the Galaxy. In 2004, he earned a starting position, starting twenty games. He was traded to Real Salt Lake in June 2005 and played eleven games that season. In 2006, Broome saw no games with the RSL first team and, due to nagging injuries, he retired at the end of the season.
