= Bobby Rhine =

American soccer player (1976–2011)

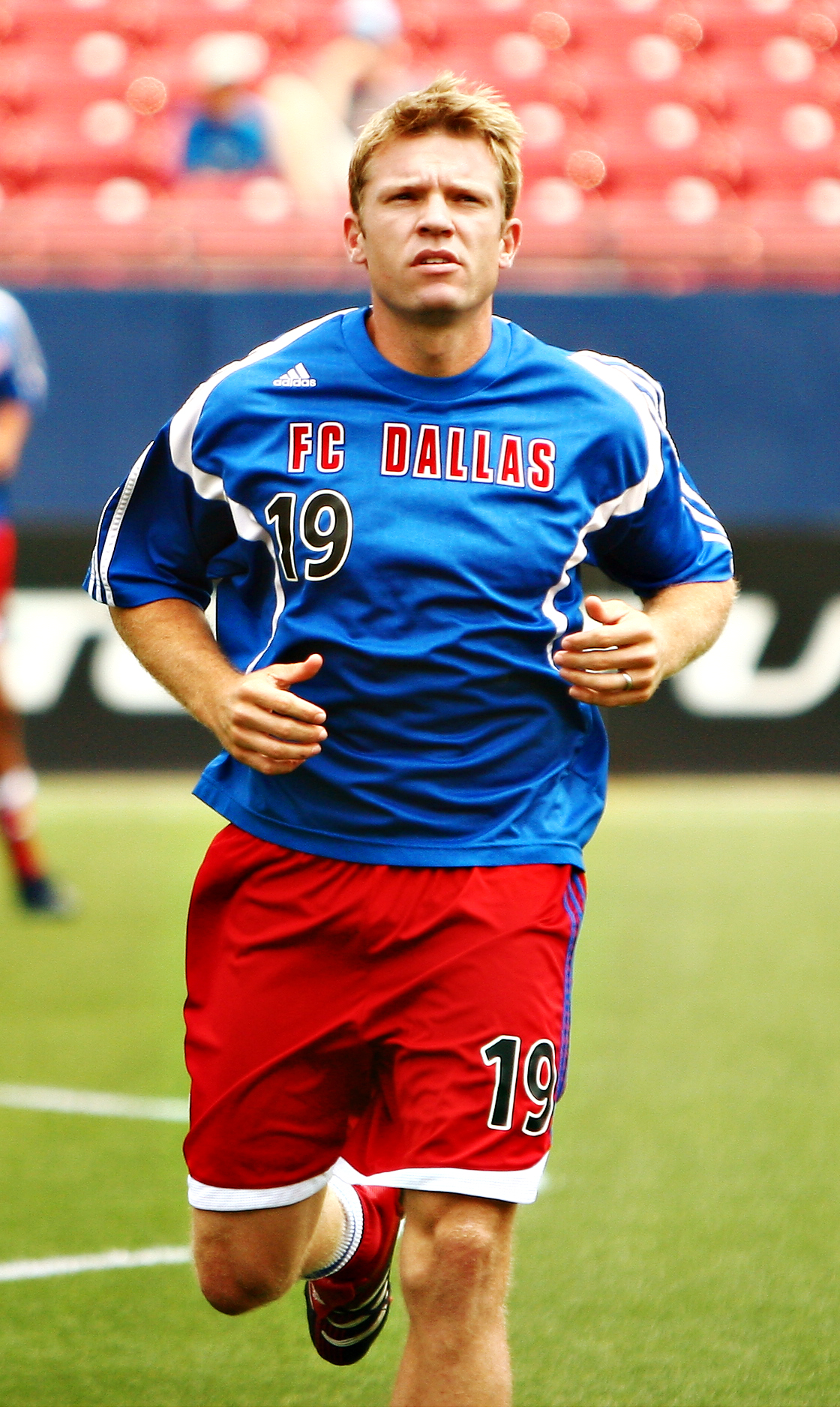

Personal information
- Full name: Bobby Rhine
- Date of birth: April 18, 1976
- Place of birth: Florissant, Missouri, United States
- Date of death: September 5, 2011 (aged 35)
- Place of death: Florida
- Height: 5 ft 10 in (1.78 m)
- Position: Midfielder

Youth career
- 1994–1998: Connecticut Huskies

Senior career*
| Years | Team | Apps | (Gls) |
| 1999–2008 | FC Dallas | 212 | (23) |
| 1999 | → Milwaukee Rampage (loan) | 2 | (0) |
| 1999 | → New Orleans Riverboat Gamblers (loan) | 2 | (1) |
| 2000 | → Tennessee Rhythm (loan) | 1 | (0) |
- * Club domestic league appearances and goals

Bobby Rhine (April 18, 1976 – September 5, 2011) was an American soccer player who last played for FC Dallas of Major League Soccer.

== Career ==
Rhine played college soccer at the University of Connecticut from 1994 to 1998. In 1997, he redshirted his senior season in order to complete his master's degree requirements. In 1998, he returned for his last season, earning second-team All-American recognition. In February 1999, the Dallas Burn selected Rhine in the first round (sixth overall) in the 1999 MLS College Draft. During his Dallas career, Rhine filled a variety of positions as an on-and-off starter, usually playing up front or in the midfield. His versatility even led to a switch to defense for the 2005 season. His best season came in 2002, when he scored seven goals and six assists and added another goal in the playoffs. In eight MLS seasons, Rhine's regular-season totals stand at 23 goals and 33 assists. In 1999, he went on loan to the Milwaukee Rampage of the USL A-League. In 2000, he played one game on loan with the Tennessee Rhythm. Rhine played his final career game against Los Angeles Galaxy on October 26, 2008, a game in which normal team captain Duilio Davino insisted Rhine take the captain's armband.

Rhine retired at the end of the 2008 season. Upon retiring, he accepted the position of Manager of Community Development with the FC Dallas front office. In addition, Rhine also worked as the color commentator for the team's television broadcasts.

== Death ==
On September 5, 2011, while vacationing with his family in Florida, Rhine died from a sudden heart attack at the age of 35.
