= Matt Jordan =

American soccer player (born 1975)

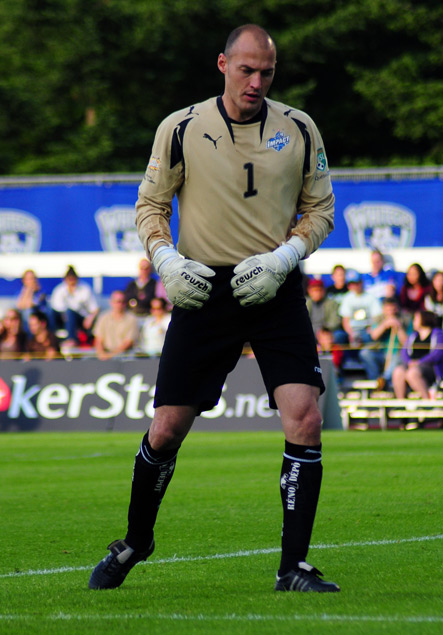
- Jordan with Montreal Impact in 2009

Personal information
- Full name: Matthew Michael Jordan
- Date of birth: October 13, 1975 (age 51)
- Place of birth: Aurora, Colorado, United States
- Height: 6 ft 2 in (1.88 m)
- Position: Goalkeeper

Youth career
- 1994–1997: Clemson Tigers

Senior career*
Years	Team	Apps	(Gls)
1998–2002	Dallas Burn	114	(0)
1998	→ MLS Pro 40 (loan)	12	(0)
2003–2004	Odense BK	2	(0)
2004–2005	Columbus Crew	3	(0)
2006	Colorado Rapids	0	(0)
2007–2010	Montreal Impact	80	(0)
Total		211	(0)
- * Club domestic league appearances and goals

Matt Jordan (born October 13, 1975, in Aurora, Colorado) is currently Vice President of Global Football for Trivela Group a PE sports investment firm, and a former professional goalkeeper.

== Youth and college ==
Jordan graduated from Overland High School in Aurora, and played college soccer at Clemson University from 1994 to 1997, for whom he started 80 total games, and was named a first-team All-American in 1997 while leading the Tigers to the NCAA quarterfinals, and a finalist for NCAA college player of the year.

He graduated from Clemson University with a bachelor's degree in marketing and a minor in Sports Marketing and holds a USSF National "B" Coaching License. Jordan was a product of Clemson University where he was a two-time First team All-American and Finalist for NCAA player of the year

== Playing career ==
Jordan was drafted 10th overall by the Dallas Burn in the first round of the 1998 MLS College Draft. He went on to play 117 games in eight seasons in Major League Soccer, compiling a record of 53-46-17 and 30 shutouts with Dallas, Columbus and Colorado.

=== Dallas Burn ===
With Dallas, Jordan was selected to the 1999 MLS All-Star Game and was a Finalist for MLS Goalkeeper of the Year, after finishing that season with a goal-against average of 1.08 and setting a new league record for shutouts with 11. He helped the team reach the playoffs in each of his five seasons with the club and was voted the club's defender of the year, and humanitarian of the year during that time.

=== Odense Boldklub ===
After five seasons with Dallas, he joined first division Danish Superliga club Odense Boldklub in 2003–2004, compiling a record of 15–3–3, including nine shutouts, with both the first and reserve teams helping the club to a fourth-place finish in league play while participating in the 2003 UEFA Cup.

=== Columbus Crew & Colorado Rapids ===
Jordan returned to MLS in the middle of the 2004 season, helping the Columbus Crew win the Eastern Conference Championship and MLS Supporters Shield, before being traded to his hometown club the Colorado Rapids in 2006, a team that advanced to the Conference Playoff Final later that year.

=== Montreal Impact ===
Jordan played four seasons with the Montreal Impact, playing a total of 115 matches, for a combined 10,238 minutes played; including 42 shutouts.

He played his first season with the Impact in 2007 and set two new club records, shutting out the opposition in six consecutive matches, while not allowing a goal during 622 minutes of play. He was named the Newcomer of the Year and was selected to the USL D1 All-League Team.

In 2008, he received the Giuseppe-Saputo Trophy, awarded to the club's Most Valuable Player. He was also a finalist for the USL First Division Goalkeeper of the Year award and was selected to the USL D1 All-League Team for the second year in a row, after finishing the season with a league-leading goal-against average of 0.760.

He was named Most Valuable Player in the Canadian Championship helping the club win the inaugural tournament, after conceding only two goals in four games. In the CONCACAF Champions League, Jordan helped the Impact become the first Canadian team to qualify for the quarterfinal round of the competition, posting five shutouts in nine matches highlighted by playing in the Impact's historic 2–0 victory over Mexican power Santos Laguna in front of 55,571 spectators at Olympic Stadium on February 25, 2009.

In 2009, he played a key role in helping the Impact capture the league championship, while setting a club record for six consecutive playoff wins. In 2010, in his last season with the Impact, he led the team to the playoff semi-final round.

With the Impact, Jordan has also faced several world-renowned clubs in international friendly games, including AC Milan, ACF Fiorentina, FC Girondins de Bordeaux and Club Atlético River Plate.

== International ==
Jordan was a member of the United States National Team pool from 2000 and 2002. He was a bronze medal winner with U.S. National B Team at the 1997 World University Games in Sicily, Italy, and represented his country on the U23, U21, U20 and U18 National Teams.

== Soccer management ==
Matt Jordan spent four years as the Montreal Impact's technical director after being appointed to the position, following a 13-year professional playing career. Jordan was named the Houston Dynamo's Technical Director/General Manager on November 4, 2014. On August 30, 2021, Houston Dynamo parted ways with Matt Jordan.

== Honors ==
=== Club ===
Montreal Impact

- USL First Division Championship (1): 2009
- Canadian Championship Voyageurs Cup (1): 2008
- Canadian Championship Voyageurs Cup (1): 2013

=== Individual ===
- George Gross Memorial Trophy: 2008
- MLS All-Star: 1999
