= Eric Dade =

American soccer player and coach

Personal information
- Date of birth: January 19, 1970 (age 56)
- Place of birth: Buffalo, New York, U.S.
- Height: 6 ft 1 in (1.85 m)
- Position: Defender

College career
Years	Team	Apps	(Gls)
1987–1991	VCU Rams		

Senior career*
Years	Team	Apps	(Gls)
1992	Dallas Rockets		
1992–1994	Baltimore Spirit (indoor)	80	(28)
1993–1996	Dallas Sidekicks (indoor)	100	(53)
1997–2001	Dallas Burn	111	(4)
2000–2004	Dallas Sidekicks (indoor)	83	(11)

Managerial career
- 2010: Jacksonville University (assistant)
- 2015: Jacksonville Armada
- * Club domestic league appearances and goals

Eric Dade (born January 19, 1970) is an American retired soccer defender who played professionally in the National Professional Soccer League, Continental Indoor Soccer League and Major League Soccer.

== Player ==
Dade attended Virginia Commonwealth University where he played on the men's soccer team from 1987 to 1991. He is a member of the VCU Athletic Hall of Fame.

On February 14, 1992, the Dallas Sidekicks drafted Dade in the fourth round of the Major Soccer League draft. However, the league collapsed that summer and the Sidekicks moved to the Continental Indoor Soccer League. Dade played the 1992 summer USISL season with the Dallas Rockets where he was named to the First Team All Star list. In September 1992, the Baltimore Spirit selected Dade in the National Professional Soccer League Amateur Draft. He became a regular that season, seeing time in forty games and was named to the NPSL All Rookie Team. In April 1993, the Sidekicks drafted Dade a second time. He signed with the Sidekicks and would go on to play four summer indoor seasons with them. In 1993, Dade scored the game-winning goal in the third, and deciding, game of the CISL championship series. He returned to the Spirit for the 1993-1994 NPSL season, then was back in Dallas for the 1994 CISL season. On September 1, 1994, Dade signed a one-year contract with the Baltimore Spirit. Three weeks later, the Spirit traded him to the Kansas City Attack for Jon Parry. Dade refused to join the Attack and spent the winter of 1994-1995 training with the Sidekicks. In 1997, Dade moved to the Dallas Burn of Major League Soccer. He played for the Burn through the 2001 season. On October 15, 2001, the Burn sent Dade on loan to the Sidekicks.

In July 2010, Jacksonville University hired Dade as a women's team assistant coach.

On 21 Sep 2015, Dade was named the Interim Head Coach for Jacksonville Armada FC replacing former head coach Guillermo Hoyos. Jacksonville Armada FC is a franchise in the North American Soccer League (NASL).
