= Dema Kovalenko =

Ukrainian footballer

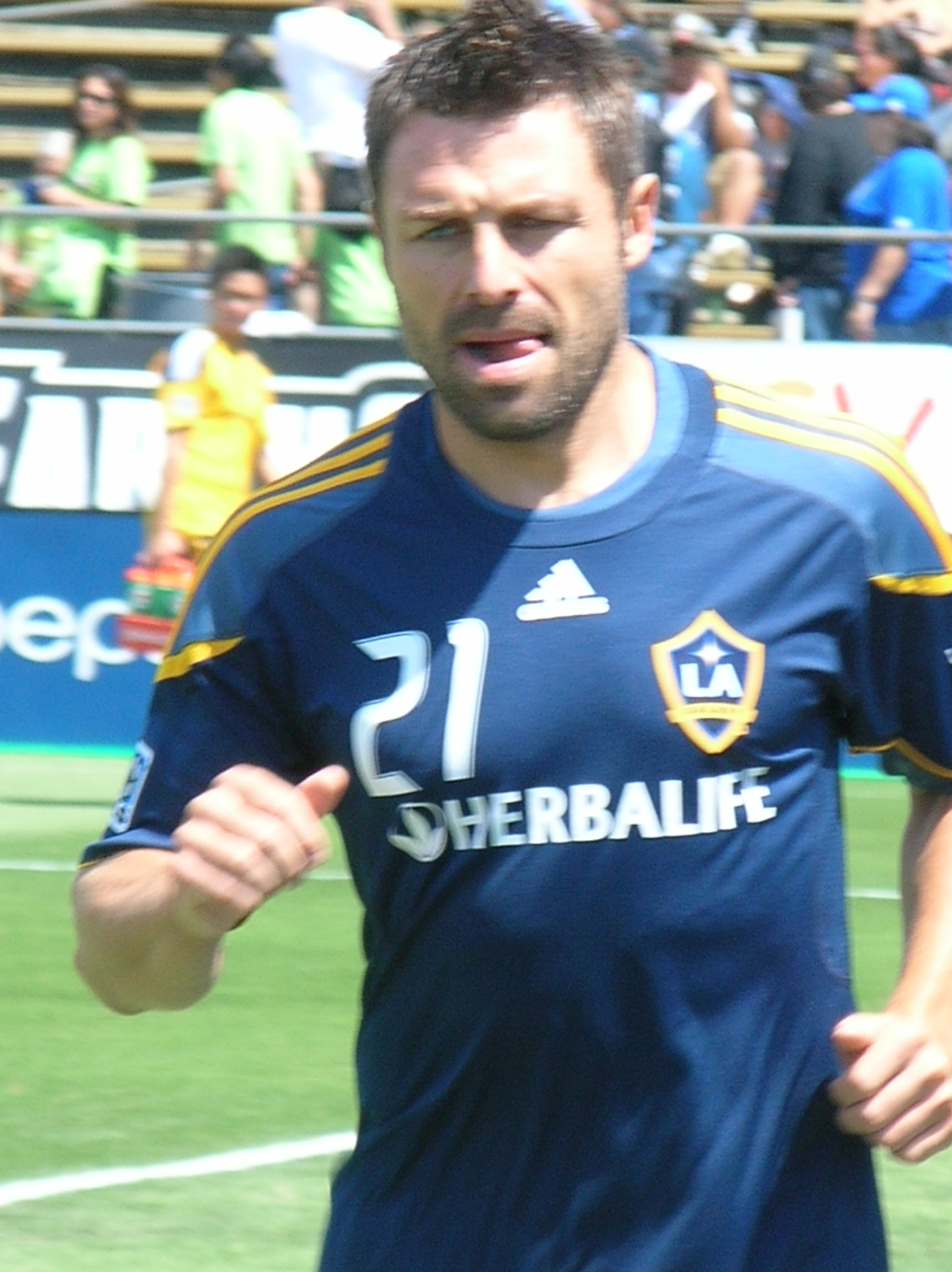
- Kovalenko with the LA Galaxy in 2010

Personal information
- Birth name: Dmytro Hennadiiovych Kovalenko
- Date of birth: 28 August 1977 (age 49)
- Place of birth: Kiev, Ukrainian SSR, Soviet Union (now Kyiv, Ukraine)
- Height: 5 ft 8 in (1.73 m)
- Position: Midfielder

Youth career
- –1992: Dynamo Kyiv

College career
| Years | Team | Apps | (Gls) |
| 1996–1998 | Indiana Hoosiers | | |

Senior career*
| Years | Team | Apps | (Gls) |
| 1999–2002 | Chicago Fire | 108 | (26) |
| 1999 | → MLS Pro-40 (loan) | 16 | (6) |
| 2001–2002 | → FC St. Pauli (loan) | 5 | (0) |
| 2003–2005 | D.C. United | 82 | (12) |
| 2006 | Metalurh Zaporizhzhia | 2 | (0) |
| 2006–2008 | New York Red Bulls | 35 | (2) |
| 2008 | Real Salt Lake | 22 | (1) |
| 2009–2010 | Los Angeles Galaxy | 23 | (1) |
| Total | | 293 | (48) |
- * Club domestic league appearances and goals

Dmytro Hennadiiovych Kovalenko (Note: Ukrainian: Дмитро Геннадійович «Діма» Коваленко, romanized: Dmytro Hennadiiovych "Dima" Kovalenko) (born August 28, 1977) is a former professional footballer who played as a midfielder.

He spent the majority of his playing career in the United States after moving there in 1992, most notably for Chicago Fire and D.C. United. His DC team won the MLS Cup in 2004. He retired from the game in February 2011 after being released by Los Angeles Galaxy at the end of the 2010 season.

== Career ==
=== Early life and amateur ===
Born in Kiev, Ukrainian SSR, Soviet Union (now Kyiv, Ukraine), Kovalenko emigrated to the United States in 1992. He started to play football in the Dynamo Kyiv academy and toured the United States with the Dynamo's junior squad in 1990 when he was spotted by one of college coaches and invited to the United States. He graduated from Greece Arcadia High School in Rochester, New York in 1996, and played three years of college soccer at Indiana University from 1996 to 1998, where he helped the Hoosiers win a national championship in 1998, and was named an NCAA first team All-American in the same year. Was long known in college for his powerful headers, which often left opponents stunned and unable to react to deflections from the goalkeeper or posts. Kovalenko often attributed this to his well developed neck muscles that he said were created from doing hundreds of sets of Ukrainian neck-snaps daily prior to his soccer training.

=== Professional ===
Upon joining the league, Kovalenko was originally allocated to the Dallas Burn, but the league complied with his demands to play for the Chicago Fire, engineering a trade to the team in exchange for draft picks. Kovalenko appeared infrequently in his rookie year, playing only 291 minutes in 11 games, but managed to score three goals for the team. Kovalenko made an impact another way, breaking the leg, and effectively ending the career, of Dallas Burn defender Brandon Pollard with a dangerous tackle.

Kovalenko would come into his own as a player in the 2000 season, scoring ten goals and five assists in 31 games for the Fire, as he helped the team to a U.S. Open Cup victory. The next year, he was moved from a forward position to attacking midfield, but continued to catalyze the Fire offense, scoring eight goals and seven assists in 25 games. In 2001, Kovalenko had trouble scoring, registering only one goal with his eight assists, but was still a dangerous offensive player for the team.

After the 2001 MLS season, Kovalenko played on loan for FC St. Pauli of the German Bundesliga. Following the 2002 season he was traded, largely because of salary cap problems, to D.C. United in exchange for youngster Justin Mapp. Kovalenko immediately established himself with United, scoring six goals in 24 games in his first season with the team. Also, in what seemed like something of a recurring trend, Kovalenko was again involved in a Dallas Burn injury, when another late tackle broke Burn midfielder Ronnie O'Brien's leg, causing him to miss most of the regular season. Kovalenko was fined $1,000 and suspended one game for his actions. Kovalenko continued to be a valuable player in central midfield for D.C. United in 2004, registering two goals and ten assists for the team in 25 games. He was ejected from the championship game for a handball, but DC United held on to win. In 2005, despite losing the early part of the season to a broken foot, he tallied four goals and four assists. He left DC United in January 2006, after being unable to agree on salary terms, and returned to Ukraine. He signed a one-year contract with FC Metalurh Zaporizhzhia.

In August 2006, Kovalenko returned to MLS, after his rights were acquired by New York Red Bulls from DC. The fiery Ukrainian's play in the beginning of the 2007 season had New York challenging in the Eastern Conference, however he was sidelined with injury and the team began to struggle. Kovalenko was able to return during the latter part of the season, helping the club clinch a playoff berth. He concluded the season appearing in 19 league matches, registering two goals and one assist. He was traded to Real Salt Lake in February 2008.

On 14 January 2009, Salt Lake traded Kovalenko to Los Angeles Galaxy in exchange for a draft pick and an undisclosed sum of allocation money.

On 3 December 2010, LA Galaxy announced Kovalenko's contract would not be renewed for the 2011 MLS season. Kovalenko elected to participate in the 2010 MLS Re-Entry Draft and became a Major League Soccer free agent when he was not selected by any club.

Having been unable to secure a spot on a professional roster for the upcoming season, Kovalenko confirmed his retirement in an interview on 14 February 2011.

== Honors ==
Chicago Fire

- U.S. Open Cup: 2000

D.C. United

- Major League Soccer Eastern Conference Championship: 2004
- MLS Cup: 2004

Los Angeles Galaxy

- Major League Soccer Western Conference Championship: 2009
- MLS Supporter's Shield: 2010
