= Chad Deering =

American soccer player (born 1970)

Personal information
- Date of birth: September 2, 1970 (age 56)
- Place of birth: Garland, Texas, United States
- Height: 6 ft 2 in (1.88 m)
- Position: Midfielder

Youth career
- –1988: Plano Senior High School
- 1988–1990: Indiana University

Senior career*
Years	Team	Apps	(Gls)
1990–1993	Werder Bremen	0	(0)
1990–1993	Werder Bremen II	65	(23)
1993–1994	Schalke 04	6	(0)
1994	Rosenborg		
1995–1996	Kickers Emden	58	(13)
1996–1998	VfL Wolfsburg	41	(5)
1998–2003	Dallas Burn	163	(16)
2004	Dallas Sidekicks (indoor)	9	(2)
2004	DFW Tornados	4	(0)
2005	Charleston Battery	0	(0)
2012–2013	Dallas Sidekicks (indoor)	4	(0)

International career
1993–2000	United States	18	(1)
- * Club domestic league appearances and goals

Chad Deering (born September 2, 1970) is an American former professional soccer player who played as a midfielder. Deering spent his professional career in Germany, Norway, Major League Soccer and Major Indoor Soccer League. He earned eighteen caps with the United States national team including one game in the 1998 FIFA World Cup.

== Club career ==
=== Youth and early career ===
Deering grew up in Plano, Texas, a suburb of Dallas, where he attended Plano Senior High School. He was twice selected as a Parade high school All-American and was the 1988 Texas high school player of the year his senior year. While in high school, he debuted with the U.S. U-16 national team for whom he played at the 1987 FIFA U-16 World Championship. During that tournament, Deering scored a goal in a 4–2 loss to South Korea.

Deering was highly recruited out of high school and elected to play with Indiana University which had just won the NCAA Men's Soccer Championship. However, he left Indiana after only two seasons in order to pursue a professional career in Germany, having scored twelve goals and assisted on twelve others. He earned NCAA First-Team All-American honors his second, and final season, with Indiana. That year he was also the NCAA's post-season tournament's points leader with three goals and one assist.

=== Germany ===
Deering began his professional career with the SV Werder Bremen reserve team. After three years and no chance of playing for the Bremen first team, Deering moved to FC Schalke 04 in 1993 where he continued to languish playing for Schalke's amateur squad. In 1994, Deering played a single season with Rosenborg of the Norwegian Premier League. He returned to Germany the next year, becoming the first of several Americans to sign with Regionalliga team Kickers Emden. In 1996, he moved from Emden to German Second Division club VfL Wolfsburg and finally found a top German team which would play him. That season, he helped Wolfsburg gain promotion to the Bundesliga. The next year, Deering played fifteen games for Wolfsburg in its first year in the German top division.

=== MLS ===
In 1998, Deering expressed an interest in returning to the U.S. to play in Major League Soccer (MLS). He subsequently signed with the league, and on July 2, 1998, MLS allocated Deering to the Dallas Burn where he became a regular for the next seven years.

=== MISL ===
On January 24, 2004, Deering signed with the Dallas Sidekicks of Major Indoor Soccer League. The 2003–2004 season was nearly over and Deering played only nine games with the Sidekicks.

=== U.S. Minor Leagues ===
In 2004, he played with the DFW Tornados of the minor league Premier Development League. On December 30, 2004, the Charleston Battery of the USL First Division signed Deering. On March 16, 2005, Deering announced his retirement from professional soccer and his intention to return to Plano, Texas, to pursue a coaching career. He never played a game with the Battery, as its season had ended in August 2004 and the 2005 season did not begin until April 2005.

== International career ==
Deering earned his first cap when he came on for Hugo Perez in a December 18, 1993 loss to Germany. Deering would go on to play eighteen games for the U.S. national team, scoring his only national team goal in a March 14, 1998, 2–2 tie with Paraguay. When U.S. coach Steve Sampson sacked John Harkes, the team's primary defensive midfielder prior to the 1998 FIFA World Cup, Sampson moved Deering into that position. However, Deering played only a single game, a 0–2 loss to Germany, in the World Cup.

== Post-playing career ==
Deering was the director of coaching for the Blackwatch Soccer Club in McKinney, Texas which merged with Solar Soccer Club in Dallas. He was the Director of coaching for Solar in McKinney and coached the Solar 98 and 96 Girls Gold teams. Currently (2014) he is the President and Director of Coaching for Dallas Rush FC in McKinney, TX.

Deering now coaches club at DKSC in Dallas, TX, which is a merger of D’Feeters and Kicks.
