= List of FC Dallas seasons =

This is a list of seasons played by FC Dallas in North American soccer competitions from 1996, when the club was formed as the Dallas Burn, to the most recent completed season. It details the club's achievements in all major competitions.

The club was formed as Dallas Burn as a founding member of Major League Soccer on June 6, 1995. On April 14, 1996, the Dallas Burn played their first ever game at the Cotton Bowl versus the San Jose Clash. The Burn were victorious in the game, winning the game in a penalty shoot-out following a 0–0 tie in regulation, in front of 27,779 fans. On August 12, 2004, the organization officially changed the club's name to FC Dallas. In its first 25 seasons of play, the team has made the playoffs 18 times (72% qualification record).

== Key ==
Key to competitions

- Major League Soccer (MLS) – The top-flight of soccer in the United States, established in 1996.
- U.S. Open Cup (USOC) – The premier knockout cup competition in U.S. soccer, first contested in 1914.
- CONCACAF Champions League (CCL) – The premier competition in North American soccer since 1962. It went by the name of Champions' Cup until 2008.
- Leagues Cup (LC) - The premier annual soccer competition established in 2019 between clubs from MLS and Liga MX, the main soccer league in Mexico.

Key to colors and symbols

1st or W	Winners
2nd or RU	Runners-up
3rd	Third place
Last	Wooden Spoon
♦	MLS Golden Boot
	Highest average attendance
Italics	Ongoing competition

Key to league record

- Season = The year and article of the season
- Div = Division/level on pyramid
- League = League name
- Pld = Games played
- W = Games won
- L = Games lost
- D = Games drawn
- GF = Goals for
- GA = Goals against
- GD = Goal difference
- Pts = Points
- PPG = Points per game
- Conf. = Conference position
- Overall = League position

Key to cup record

- DNE = Did not enter
- DNQ = Did not qualify
- NH = Competition not held or canceled
- QR = Qualifying round
- PR = Preliminary round
- GS = Group stage
- R1 = First round
- R2 = Second round
- R3 = Third round
- R4 = Fourth round
- R5 = Fifth round
- Ro32 = Round of 32
- Ro16 = Round of 16
- QF = Quarterfinals
- SF = Semifinals
- F = Final
- RU = Runners-up
- W = Winners

== Seasons ==
Season	League									Position		Playoffs	USOC	Continental			Average attendance	Top goalscorer(s)	
Season	Pld	W	L	D	GF	GA	GD	Pts	PPG	Conf.	Overall	Playoffs	USOC	CCL	LC	Other(s)	Average attendance	Name(s)	Goals
1996	32	17	15	0	50	48	+2	41	1.28	2nd	4th	QF	SF	DNE	NH		16,011	(United States) Jason Kreis	14
1997	32	16	16	0	55	49	+6	42	1.31	3rd	5th	SF	W	DNQ	NH	CONCACAF Cup Winners Cup (GS)	9,678	(United States) Dante Washington	14
1998	32	15	17	0	43	59	–16	37	1.16	4th	7th	QF	QF	DNQ	NH		10,947	(United States) Jason Kreis	10
1999	32	19	13	0	54	35	+19	51	1.59	2nd	3rd	SF	QF	DNQ	NH		12,211	(United States) Jason Kreis	20♦
2000	32	14	14	4	54	54	0	46	1.44	3rd	6th	QF	QF	DNQ	NH		13,102	(Ecuador) Ariel Graziani	15
2001	26	10	11	5	48	47	+1	35	1.35	3rd	8th	QF	R2	DNQ	NH		12,574	(Ecuador) Ariel Graziani	11
2002	28	12	9	7	44	43	+1	43	1.54	3rd	3rd	QF	SF	DNQ	NH		13,122	(United States) Jason Kreis	14
2003	30	6	19	5	35	64	–29	23	0.77	5th	10th	DNQ	Ro16	DNQ	NH		7,906	(United States) Jason Kreis	7
2004	30	10	14	6	34	45	–11	36	1.20	5th	8th	DNQ	QF	DNQ	NH		9,008	(United States) Eddie Johnson	14
2005	32	13	10	9	52	44	+8	48	1.50	2nd	5th	QF	RU	DNQ	NH		11,189	(Guatemala) Carlos Ruiz	13
2006	32	16	12	4	48	44	+4	52	1.63	1st	2nd	QF	QF	DNQ	NH		14,982	(Guatemala) Carlos Ruiz	15
2007	30	13	12	5	37	44	–7	44	1.47	3rd	5th	QF	RU	DNQ	NH	SuperLiga (GS)	15,154	(Guatemala) Carlos Ruiz	8
2008	30	8	10	12	45	41	+4	36	1.20	5th	11th	DNQ	QF	DNQ	NH		13,024	(United States) Kenny Cooper	19
2009	30	11	13	6	50	47	+3	39	1.30	7th	11th	DNQ	QR1	DNQ	NH		12,440	(United States) Jeff Cunningham	17♦
2010	30	12	4	14	42	28	+14	50	1.67	3rd	4th	RU	QR2	DNQ	NH		10,815	(United States) Jeff Cunningham	12
2011	34	15	12	7	42	39	+3	52	1.53	4th	4th	R1	SF	GS	NH		12,861	(United States) Brek Shea	11
2012	34	9	13	12	42	47	–5	39	1.15	6th	13th	DNQ	R3	DNQ	NH		14,199	(Panama) Blas Pérez	12
2013	34	11	12	11	48	52	–4	44	1.29	8th	15th	DNQ	QF	DNQ	NH		15,373	(Panama) Blas Pérez	12
2014	34	16	12	6	55	45	+10	54	1.59	4th	6th	QF	SF	DNQ	NH		16,816	(Colombia) Fabián Castillo (Panama) Blas Pérez	14
2015	34	18	10	6	52	39	+13	60	1.76	1st	2nd	SF	Ro16	DNQ	NH		16,013	(Colombia) Michael Barrios (Colombia) Fabián Castillo	10
2016	34	17	8	9	50	40	+10	60	1.76	1st	1st	QF	W	SF	NH		14,094	(Argentina) Maximiliano Urruti	13
2017	34	11	10	13	48	48	0	46	1.35	7th	13th	DNQ	QF	DNQ	NH		15,122	(Argentina) Maximiliano Urruti	13
2018	34	16	9	9	52	44	+8	57	1.68	4th	6th	R1	Ro16	Ro16	NH		15,512	(Belgium) Roland Lamah (Argentina) Maximiliano Urruti	9
2019	34	13	12	9	54	46	+8	48	1.41	7th	13th	R1	Ro16	DNQ	DNQ		14,842	(United States) Jesús Ferreira	8
2020	22	9	6	7	28	24	+4	34	1.55	6th	11th	QF	NH	DNQ	DNQ/NH		5,527*	(Argentina) Franco Jara	7
2021	34	7	15	12	47	56	-9	33	0.91	11th	23rd	DNQ	NH	DNQ	DNQ		13,418	(United States) Ricardo Pepi	13
2022	34	14	9	11	48	37	+11	53	1.56	3rd	7th	QF	Ro32	DNQ	DNQ		16,615	(United States) Jesús Ferreira	18
2023	34	11	10	13	42	38	+4	46	1.35	7th	14th	R1	Ro32	DNQ	Ro16		18,287	(United States) Jesús Ferreira	14
2024	34	11	15	8	54	56	-2	41	1.21	11th	19th	DNQ	QF	DNQ	GS		19,096	(Croatia) Petar Musa	17
2025	34	11	12	11	52	55	-3	44	1.29	7th	16th	R1	Ro16	DNQ	DNQ		11,013*	(Croatia) Petar Musa	19
Total	1026	381	354	221	1405	1358	+47	1334	1.30	–	–	–	–	–	–	–	13,366	–	127

1. Avg. attendance only includes statistics from regular season matches.
2. Top goalscorer(s) includes all goals scored in the regular season, MLS Cup Playoffs, U.S. Open Cup, MLS is Back Tournament, CONCACAF Champions League, Leagues Cup, FIFA Club World Cup, and other competitive continental matches.
