= 2013 FC Dallas season =

FC Dallas
2013 season
- President: Clark Hunt
- Manager: Schellas Hyndman
- Stadium: Toyota Stadium
- MLS: 15th
- U.S. Open Cup: Lost Quarterfinal vs. Portland Timbers (2–3)
- Top goalscorer: League: Blas Perez (8); All: Blas Perez (8)
- Highest home attendance: 22,035 vs Chivas USA (July 4, 2013)
- Lowest home attendance: 10,112 vs Portland Timbers (May 8, 2013)
- Average home league attendance: 15,374
Primary colors	Secondary colors

The 2013 FC Dallas season was the eighteenth of the team's existence. The team began their preseason by signing three new players to the squad: Stephen Keel, Peter Luccin, and Pipico.

== Club ==
=== Coaching staff ===
Position	Staff
Head coach	Schellas Hyndman
Assistant coach	Drew Keeshan
Reserve coach	Marco Ferruzzi
Fitness trainer	Skylar Richards
Goalkeepers coach	Drew Keeshan
Technical director	Luiz Muzzi
Equipment managers	Marcus Owens

=== Stadiums ===
Ground (capacity and dimensions)	Toyota Stadium (20,500 / 107m×68m)

== Players ==
Squad No.	Nationality	Position	Name	Date of birth (age)	Signed from	Signed in	Apps.	Goals
Goalkeepers
1	(Peru)	GK	Raúl Fernández	October 6, 1985 (age 40)	OGC Nice	2013	12	0
18	(United States)	GK	Chris Seitz	March 12, 1987 (age 38)	Philadelphia Union	2011	5	0
Defenders
3	(United States)	DF	Ugo Ihemelu	April 3, 1983 (age 42)	Colorado Rapids	2009	68	5
5	(Colombia)	DF	Jair Benítez	January 11, 1979 (age 47)	Deportivo Cali	2009	96	1
14	(United States)	DF	George John	March 20, 1987 (age 38)	Washington Huskies	2009	106	6

=== Out on loan ===
No.	Pos.	Nation	Player
—	DF	USA	Moises Hernandez (on loan at Saprissa)

== Pre-season and friendlies ==
Win Draw Loss

February 6	Mérida F.C.	0–3	{{{team2}}}
			Cooper 20' 37'; Ferreira 38'

February 7	Atlante F.C.	2–3	FC Dallas
	Goal		Baladez 11' 28'; Warshaw 74'

February 11	Atlante F.C. U-20	0–3	FC Dallas
			Cooper 21'; Michel 24'; Top 44'

February 17	FC Dallas	0–0	AIK Fotboll	Portland, Oregon USA
			Bahoui (yellow card) 52'; Johansson (yellow card) 58'	Stadium: Jeld-Wen Field

February 20	FC Dallas	1–0	Portland Timbers	Portland, Oregon USA
21:30	Hedges (yellow card) 5'; Pérez 15'; Watson (yellow card) 71'		Nanchoff (yellow card) 24'	Stadium: Jeld-Wen Field

February 23	FC Dallas	1–2	San Jose Earthquakes	Portland, Oregon USA
	Jackson 25'		Wondolowski 15'; Fucito 49'	Stadium: Jeld-Wen Field

== Competitions ==
=== Overview ===
Competition	Started round	Current position / round	Final position / round	First match	Last match
Major League Soccer	—	6th (West)		March 2	October 26
U.S. Open Cup	Third Round	—	Quarterfinal	May 28	June 26

Updated to match played September 7, 2013
Source: Competitions

=== Major League Soccer ===
==== Overall standings ====
Pos	Team	Pld	W	L	T	GF	GA	GD	Pts	Qualification
1	New York Red Bulls (S)	34	17	9	8	58	41	+17	59	CONCACAF Champions League
2	Sporting Kansas City (C)	34	17	10	7	47	30	+17	58	CONCACAF Champions League
3	Portland Timbers	34	14	5	15	54	33	+21	57	CONCACAF Champions League
4	Real Salt Lake	34	16	10	8	57	41	+16	56	
5	LA Galaxy	34	15	11	8	53	38	+15	53	
6	Seattle Sounders FC	34	15	12	7	42	42	0	52	
7	New England Revolution	34	14	11	9	49	38	+11	51	
8	Colorado Rapids	34	14	11	9	45	38	+7	51	
9	Houston Dynamo	34	14	11	9	41	41	0	51	
10	San Jose Earthquakes	34	14	11	9	35	42	−7	51	
11	Montreal Impact	34	14	13	7	50	49	+1	49	CONCACAF Champions League
12	Chicago Fire	34	14	13	7	47	52	−5	49	
13	Vancouver Whitecaps FC	34	13	12	9	53	45	+8	48	
14	Philadelphia Union	34	12	12	10	42	44	−2	46	
15	FC Dallas	34	11	12	11	48	52	−4	44	
16	Columbus Crew	34	12	17	5	42	46	−4	41	
17	Toronto FC	34	6	17	11	30	47	−17	29	
18	Chivas USA	34	6	20	8	30	67	−37	26	
19	D.C. United	34	3	24	7	22	59	−37	16	CONCACAF Champions League

Source: MLS
Rules for classification: 1) points; 2) head-to-head record; 3) goal difference; 4) number of goals scored
(C) MLS Cup Champion; (S) Supporters' Shield

==== Standings ====
Western Conference

Pos	Team	Pld	W	L	T	GF	GA	GD	Pts	Qualification
1	Portland Timbers	34	14	5	15	54	33	+21	57	MLS Cup Conference Semifinals
2	Real Salt Lake	34	16	10	8	57	41	+16	56	MLS Cup Conference Semifinals
3	LA Galaxy	34	15	11	8	53	38	+15	53	MLS Cup Conference Semifinals
4	Seattle Sounders FC	34	15	12	7	42	42	0	52	MLS Cup Knockout Round
5	Colorado Rapids	34	14	11	9	45	38	+7	51	MLS Cup Knockout Round
6	San Jose Earthquakes	34	14	11	9	35	42	−7	51	
7	Vancouver Whitecaps FC	34	13	12	9	53	45	+8	48	
8	FC Dallas	34	11	12	11	48	52	−4	44	
9	Chivas USA	34	6	20	8	30	67	−37	26	

Source: MLS

==== Results summary ====
Overall								Home						Away					
Pld	W	D	L	GF	GA	GD	Pts	W	D	L	GF	GA	GD	W	D	L	GF	GA	GD
34	11	11	12	48	52	−4	44	9	5	3	29	22	+7	2	6	9	19	30	−11

Last updated: October 13, 2013.
Source: Competitive matches

==== Results by round ====
Round	1	2	3	4	5	6	7	8	9	10	11	12	13	14	15	16	17	18	19	20	21	22	23	24	25	26	27	28	29	30	31	32	33	34
Stadium	H	A	H	H	A	A	H	H	A	H	H	A	H	A	A	H	A	H	A	H	A	A	H	A	A	H	H	A	A	H	A	H	H	A
Result	W	L	W	W	W	D	W	W	D	D	W	L	W	D	L	D	D	D	L	L	D	L	D	L	W	D	W	L	L	L	D	L	W	L

Updated to match(es) played on October 13, 2013. Source: Competitive Matches
A = Away; H = Home; W = Win; D = Draw; L = Loss

==== Matches ====
Win Draw Loss

March 2 1	FC Dallas	1–0	Colorado Rapids	Frisco, Texas
	Jackson 11'; Watson (yellow card) 80'	Report		Stadium: FC Dallas Stadium; Attendance: 18,075; Referee: Allen Chapman

March 10 2	Chivas USA	3–1	FC Dallas	Carson, California
	Burling (yellow card) 23'; Minda (yellow card) 55'; Luna (yellow card) 67'; Agudelo 68'; Minda 76'; Casillas 90'	Report	Ferreira 57'	Stadium: Home Depot Center; Attendance: 6,810; Referee: Armando Villareal

March 17 3 Texas Derby	FC Dallas	3–2	Houston Dynamo	Frisco, Texas
	John 34'; Jacobson 36'; Cooper 90'	Report	Sarkodie (yellow card) 55'; Driver 79'; Davis 83'	Stadium: FC Dallas Stadium; Attendance: 15,623; Referee: Jair Marrufo

March 23 4	FC Dallas	2–0	Real Salt Lake	Frisco, Texas
	Castillo 71'; Jackson 81'	Report	Álvarez (red card) 83'; Grabavoy (yellow card) 90'	Stadium: FC Dallas Stadium; Attendance: 11,181; Referee: Juan Guzman

March 30 5	New England Revolution	0–1	FC Dallas	Foxborough, Massachusetts
	Rowe (yellow card) 64'	Report	Ferreira (yellow card) 51'; Pérez 87'	Stadium: Gillette Stadium; Attendance: 10,284; Referee: David Gantar

April 6 6	Toronto FC	2–2	FC Dallas	Toronto, Ontario
	Russell (yellow card) 14' (goal) 90'; Ephraim (yellow card) 45'; Silva (yellow card) 59'; Braun 85' (yellow card) 90'	Report	Benítez (yellow card) 21'; Jacobson 34' (yellow card) 86'; Pérez 59'; Castillo (yellow card) 84'	Stadium: BMO Field; Attendance: 16,111; Referee: Ismail Elfath

April 13 7	FC Dallas	1–0	Los Angeles Galaxy	Frisco, Texas
	Jackson (yellow card) 53'; John 87'	Report	Gonzalez (yellow card) 52'; Leonardo (red card) 60'; Magee (yellow card) 77'	Stadium: FC Dallas Stadium; Attendance: 20,465

April 20 8	FC Dallas	2–0	Vancouver Whitecaps FC	Frisco, Texas
	Rusin 29' (own); Perez 50'; John (yellow card) 61'	Recap	Reo-Coker (yellow card) 45'	Stadium: FC Dallas Stadium; Attendance: 14,339

April 27 9	Vancouver Whitecaps FC	2–2	FC Dallas	Vancouver, British Columbia
	Koffie (yellow card) 2'; Manneh 72'; Sanvezzo 75'	Recap	O'Brien 9' (own); Hedges 47'; Jackson (red card) 78'; Fernandez (yellow card) 81'	Stadium: BC Place; Attendance: 19,967

May 8 10	FC Dallas	1–1	Portland Timbers	Frisco, Texas
	Cooper 77'	Recap	Nagbe 70'; Jean-Baptiste (yellow card) 76'; Zemanski (yellow card) 94'	Stadium: FC Dallas Stadium; Attendance: 10,112

May 11 11	FC Dallas	2–1	D.C. United	Frisco, Texas
	Jackson 11'; Castillo (yellow card) 36'; Hassli (yellow card) 46'; Watson 77' (yellow card) 92'	Recap	White (yellow card) 25'; De Rosario 43' (yellow card) 69'	Stadium: FC Dallas Stadium; Attendance: 14,322

May 18 12	Seattle Sounders FC	4–2	FC Dallas	Seattle, Washington
	Johnson 16', 62'; Neagle 31'; Martins 83'; Yedlin (yellow card) 87'	Recap	Woodberry (yellow card) 43'; Cooper 54'; Michel 61'; Perez (yellow card) 73'	Stadium: CenturyLink Field; Attendance: 38,979

May 25 13	FC Dallas	1–0	San Jose Earthquakes	Frisco, Texas
	Castillo 33'; John (yellow card) 40'	Recap	Jahn (yellow card) 4'; Bernardez (yellow card) 67'; Lenhart (yellow card) 73'	Stadium: FC Dallas Stadium; Attendance: 15,063

June 1 14	Colorado Rapids	2–2	FC Dallas	Commerce City, Colorado
	Harris 56', 64'; Powers (yellow card) 59'	Recap	Perez 61', 66'; Michel (yellow card) 63'; Jacobson (yellow card) 96'	Stadium: Dick's Sporting Goods Park; Attendance: 17,551

June 15 15	Portland Timbers	1–0	FC Dallas	Portland, Oregon
		Recap		Stadium: Jen-Wen Field

June 22 16	FC Dallas	2–2	Sporting Kansas City	Frisco, Texas
	Watson 57' (own); Jacobson 88'; Zimmerman 90'	Recap	Kamara 43' (pen.); Sapong (red card) 68'; Nielsen (yellow card) 90+3'	Stadium: FC Dallas Stadium; Attendance: 16,361

June 29 17	Philadelphia Union	2–2	FC Dallas	Chester, Pennsylvania
	Okugo 20'; Carroll (yellow card) 55'; Casey (yellow card) 76'; Hoppenot (yellow card) 78'; Aaron Wheeler 87'	Recap	Castillo (yellow card) 2'; Zimmerman 24'; Jackson (yellow card) 37'; Watson (red card); Perez (yellow card) 90+5' (goal) 90+7'	Stadium: PPL Park; Attendance: 18,212

July 4 18	FC Dallas	0–0	Chivas USA	Frisco, Texas
	Loyd (yellow card) 70'; Castillo (yellow card) 89'	Recap	Villafana (yellow card) 45+1'; Farfan (yellow card) 55'; Rivera (yellow card) 84'	Stadium: FC Dallas Stadium; Attendance: 22,035

July 7 19	Los Angeles Galaxy	2–0	FC Dallas	Carson, California
	Juninho (yellow card) 29'; Sarvas 65'; Jimenez 80'	Recap	Ferreira (yellow card) 28'; Perez (yellow card) 54'	Stadium: Home Depot Center; Attendance: 19,729

July 13 20	FC Dallas	0–3	Real Salt Lake	Frisco, Texas
	Keel (yellow card) 45 + 3'; Castillo (yellow card) 90 + 2'	Recap	Morales 39'; Alvarez (yellow card) 47'; Grabavoy 79'; Garcia 90'	Stadium: FC Dallas Stadium; Attendance: 16,560

July 20 21	Montreal Impact	0–0	FC Dallas	Montreal, Quebec
	Paponi (yellow card) 61'; Arnaud (yellow card) 70'	Recap	Watson (yellow card) 59'; Cooper (yellow card) 83'; Hassli (yellow card) 84'	Stadium: Saputo Stadium; Attendance: 20,801

August 3 22	Seattle Sounders FC	3–0	FC Dallas	Seattle, Washington
	Martins 8'; Johnson 22' (yellow card) 90 + 2'; Traore (yellow card) 54'; Alonso (yellow card) 69'; Evans 90 + 4'	Recap	Perez (yellow card) 65'; John (yellow card) 84'; Ferreira (yellow card) 90 + 4'	Stadium: CenturyLink Field; Attendance: 39,360

August 11 23	FC Dallas	3–3	Los Angeles Galaxy	Frisco, Texas
	Hedges 15' (yellow card) 45 + 1'; Benitez (yellow card) 69'; Perez 48', 86'; Michel (yellow card) 88'	Recap	Franklin (yellow card) 29'; Donovan 45 + 1', 73', 82'; Leonardo (yellow card) 85'; Cudicini (yellow card) 86'	Stadium: FC Dallas Stadium; Attendance: 18,161

August 17 24	Portland Timbers	2–1	FC Dallas	Portland, Oregon
	Johnson 26'; Nagbe 33'; Zemanski (yellow card) 53'; Valeri (yellow card) 59'	Recap	Diaz 28'; Jackson (yellow card) 54'; Perez (yellow card) 58'	Stadium: Jeld-Wen Field; Attendance: 20,674

August 21 25	Chivas USA	1–3	FC Dallas	Carson, California
	de la Fuente 43'	Recap	Jackson (red card); Benitez (yellow card) 60'; Perez 71'; Ferreira 86'; Nunez 90'	Stadium: The Home Depot Center; Attendance: 7,071

August 24 26	FC Dallas	2–2	San Jose Earthquakes	Frisco, Texas
	Perez 19'; Erick (yellow card) 30'; Michel 72'; Cooper (red card) 86'	Recap	Gordon 8'; Beitashour 16'; Wondolowski (yellow card) 45 + 1'; Morrow (red card) 81'; Bernardez (red card) 86'	Stadium: FC Dallas Stadium; Attendance: 14,920

September 7 27	FC Dallas	3–1	Vancouver Whitecaps FC	Frisco, Texas
	Watson 8'; Diaz 87'; Benitez 89'	Recap	Kobayashi 4'; Leveron (yellow card) 30'	Stadium: FC Dallas Stadium; Attendance: 13,603

September 14 28	Colorado Rapids	2–1	FC Dallas	Commerce City, Colorado
	Sanchez 59'; Sturgis (yellow card) 76'	Recap	Ferreira 51'; Hedges 65' (own)	Stadium: Dick's Sporting Goods Park; Attendance: 13,145

September 22 29	New York Red Bulls	1–0	FC Dallas	Harrison, New Jersey
		Recap	Benitez (yellow card) 38'; Castillo (yellow card) 74'; Erick 76' (own); Acosta (yellow card) 81'	Stadium: Red Bull Arena; Attendance: 18,976

September 29 30	FC Dallas	2–4	Columbus Crew	Frisco, Texas
	Perez 21'; Diaz 54'; Acosta (yellow card) 75'; Ferreira (yellow card) 83'	Recap	Higuaín 9'; Arrieta 17'; Oduro 44'; Anor (yellow card) 66' (goal) 86'; Trapp (yellow card) 72'; Finlay (yellow card) 80'	Stadium: Toyota Stadium; Attendance: 11,422

October 5 31	Real Salt Lake	1–1	FC Dallas	Sandy, Utah
	Mansally (yellow card) 17'; Saborio 60'; Morales (yellow card) 69'	Recap	Perez (yellow card) 13'; Cooper 72'; Luccin (yellow card) 78'	Stadium: Rio Tinto Stadium; Attendance: 20,488

October 12 32 Brimstone Cup	FC Dallas	2–3	Chicago Fire	Frisco, Texas
	Jackson (yellow card) 21'; Cooper 63', 75'; Castillo (yellow card) 84'	Recap	Anangonó 25'; Magee 42'; Anibala 52'	Stadium: Toyota Stadium; Attendance: 14,087

October 19 33	FC Dallas	2–0	Seattle Sounders FC	Frisco, Texas
	Luccin (yellow card) 14'; Hedges 65'; Jacobson (yellow card) 77'; Michel 87' (yellow card) 88'	Recap		Stadium: Toyota Stadium; Attendance: 15,017

October 26 34	San Jose Earthquakes	2–1	FC Dallas	Santa Clara, California
	Martinez 27'; Corrales (yellow card) 47'; Wondolowski 57'		Benitez (yellow card) 72'; Luccin (yellow card) 85'; Keel 90'	Stadium: Buck Shaw Stadium; Attendance: 10,525

=== U.S. Open Cup ===
May 28 Third round	Fort Lauderdale Strikers (Florida)	0–2	(Texas) FC Dallas	Fort Lauderdale, Florida
7:30 PM EDT	Pecka (yellow card) 66'; Restrepo (yellow card) 73'	Report	Michel (yellow card) 37'; Hedges (yellow card) 45' (goal) 66'; Pérez 54'; Castillo (yellow card) 75'; Woodberry (yellow card) 83'	Stadium: Lockhart Stadium

June 12 Fourth round	FC Dallas (Texas)	3–0	(Texas) Houston Dynamo	Frisco, Texas
8:00 PM CDT	Cooper 37', 59'; Castillo (yellow card) 67'; Loyd 76'			Stadium: FC Dallas Stadium; Attendance: 4,006; Referee: Juan Guzman

June 26 Quarterfinals	FC Dallas (Texas)	2–3	(Oregon) Portland Timbers	Frisco, Texas
	Watson 14'; Jacobson (yellow card) 60'; Pérez 86'; John (yellow card) 90+'	Recap	Kah (yellow card) 47'; Nagbe 61'; Valeri 63'; Piquionne 72'; Johnson (yellow card) 89'	Stadium: FC Dallas Stadium; Attendance: 3,889

== Statistics ==
=== Goals ===
R	Player	Position	MLS	Open Cup	Total
1	(Panama) Blas Pérez	FW	11	1	12
2	(United States) Kenny Cooper	FW	6	2	8
3	(Brazil) Jackson	MF	3	0	3
3	(United States) George John	DF	2	1	3
5	(United States) Andrew Jacobson	DF	2	0	2
5	(Colombia) Fabián Castillo	FW	2	0	2
7	(Colombia) David Ferreira	MF	1	0	1
7	(Brazil) Michel	DF	1	0	1
7	(United States) Matt Hedges	DF	1	0	1
7	(Jamaica) Je-Vaughn Watson	MF	1	0	1
7	(United States) Zach Loyd	DF	0	1	1
Own goals			2	0	2
Total			28	5	33

=== Assists ===
R	Player	Position	MLS	Open Cup	Total
1	(Brazil) Michel	DF	4	3	7
2	(Colombia) David Ferreira	MF	4	0	4
3	(Brazil) Jackson	MF	3	0	3
4	(United States) Kenny Cooper	FW	1	0	1
4	(Colombia) Fabián Castillo	FW	1	0	1
4	(France) Eric Hassli	FW	1	0	1
4	(Jamaica) Je-Vaughn Watson	MF	0	1	1
Total			16	4	20

=== Goalkeeping ===
R	Player	Position	GAA	GA	Saves	GS	GP
1	(United States) Chris Seitz	GK	0.50	1	5	2	2
2	(Peru) Raúl Fernández	GK	1.27	14	45	11	11

== FC Dallas Reserves ==
Pos	Club	GP	W	L	T	GF	GA	GD	Pts	PPG
1	Houston Dynamo Reserves (C)	9	5	4	0	12	16	-4	15	1.67
2	Columbus Crew Reserves	14	6	6	2	28	26	+2	20	1.43
3	New York Red Bulls Reserves	12	5	5	2	24	19	+5	17	1.42
4	Montreal Impact Reserves	11	4	4	3	16	13	+3	15	1.36
5	Toronto FC Reserves	8	3	4	1	15	12	+3	10	1.25
6	FC Dallas Reserves	13	5	7	1	21	26	-5	16	1.23
7	Chicago Fire Reserves	13	5	7	1	24	30	-6	16	1.23

=== Matches ===
Win Draw Loss

March 17, 2013 1	FC Dallas Reserves	1–3	Houston Dynamo Reserves	Frisco, Texas
	Warshaw 34'	Report	Creavalle 5'; Dixon (yellow card) 17'; Ownby 73'; Gonzalez 84'	Stadium: FC Dallas Stadium

April 6, 2013 2	Toronto FC Reserves	v	FC Dallas Reserves	Toronto, Ontario, Canada
				Stadium: BMO Field

April 16, 2013 3	Houston Dynamo Reserves	v	FC Dallas Reserves	Houston, Texas
				Stadium: Houston Amateur Sports Park

May 1, 2013 4	Chicago Fire Reserves	v	FC Dallas Reserves	Chicago, Illinois
				Stadium: Toyota Park Practice Field

June 4, 2013 5	Montreal Impact Reserves	v	FC Dallas Reserves	Montreal, Quebec, Canada
				Stadium: CS Claude-Robillard

July 23, 2013 6	FC Dallas Reserves	v	Antigua Barracuda FC	Frisco, Texas
				Stadium: FC Dallas Stadium

August 6, 2013 7	FC Dallas Reserves	v	New York Red Bulls Reserves	Frisco, Texas
				Stadium: FC Dallas Stadium

August 27, 2013 8	Columbus Crew Reserves	v	FC Dallas Reserves	Columbus, Ohio
				Stadium: Crew Stadium

September 3, 2013 9	New York Red Bulls Reserves	v	FC Dallas Reserves	New York
				Stadium: Montclair St. University

September 15, 2013 10	Colorado Rapids Reserves	v	FC Dallas Reserves	Colorado
				Stadium: DSG Park

September 25, 2013 11	FC Dallas Reserves	v	Toronto FC Reserves	Frisco, Texas
				Stadium: FC Dallas Stadium

September 30, 2013 12	FC Dallas Reserves	v	Columbus Crew Reserves	Frisco, Texas
				Stadium: FC Dallas Stadium

October 7, 2013 13	FC Dallas Reserves	v	Montreal Impact Reserves	Frisco, Texas
				Stadium: FC Dallas Stadium

October 13, 2013 14	FC Dallas Reserves	v	Chicago Fire Reserves	Frisco, Texas
				Stadium: FC Dallas Stadium

== Reserve League Statistics ==
=== Goals ===
R	Player	Position	MLS Reserve League
1	(United States) Bobby Warshaw	DF	1
Total			1

=== Assists ===
R	Player	Position	MLS Reserve League
1	(Colombia) Fabián Castillo	FW	1
Total			1
