= 2003 Dallas Burn season =

Dallas Burn
2003 season
- Owner: Hunt Sports Group
- Head coach: Mike Jeffries (until September); Colin Clarke (September – October)
- Stadium: Dragon Stadium
- MLS: Conference: 5th Overall: 10th
- U.S. Open Cup: Lost Fourth Round vs. Wilmington Hammerheads (1–4)
- Brimstone Cup: Won Championship vs. Chicago Fire (1–1)
- Average home league attendance: 7,906
Home colors	Away colors

The 2003 Dallas Burn season was the eighth season of the Major League Soccer team. It still stands as the worst season in franchise history. It was the only season where the team had the worst record in the entire league. The team's average attendance of 7,906 still stands as the lowest in franchise history. The season saw team management fire head coach Mike Jeffries in September. Colin Clarke took over as interim head coach for the rest of the season. The 2003 season was played at Dragon Stadium in Southlake, Texas, home of the Southlake Carroll high school football team, featuring black, purple, white and yellow field lines for 5 different sports, on artificial turf. At the Cotton Bowl, the Dallas Burn were known throughout the western hemisphere for having the best pitch in soccer. The inexplicable stadium move decimated the team and their fans. Crowds dwindled below 1000 and the team finished the season with a -29 goal differential.

== Final standings ==
Pos	Team	Pld	W	L	T	GF	GA	GD	Pts	Qualification
1	San Jose Earthquakes	30	14	7	9	45	35	+10	51	MLS Cup Playoffs
2	Kansas City Wizards	30	11	10	9	48	44	+4	42	MLS Cup Playoffs
3	Colorado Rapids	30	11	12	7	40	45	−5	40	MLS Cup Playoffs
4	Los Angeles Galaxy	30	9	12	9	35	35	0	36	MLS Cup Playoffs
5	Dallas Burn	30	6	19	5	35	64	−29	23	

Source: MLS

== Regular season ==
April 12, 2003 1	Los Angeles Galaxy	1–1 (OT)	Dallas Burn	Southlake, Texas
				Stadium: Dragon Stadium

April 26, 2003 2	New England Revolution	2–1	Dallas Burn	Southlake, Texas
				Stadium: Dragon Stadium

May 3, 2003 3	Dallas Burn	0–0 (OT)	D.C. United	Washington, D.C.
				Stadium: RFK Stadium

May 10, 2003 4	Kansas City Wizards	3–1	Dallas Burn	Southlake, Texas
				Stadium: Dragon Stadium

May 17, 2003 5	Los Angeles Galaxy	1–1 (OT)	Dallas Burn	Southlake, Texas
				Stadium: Dragon Stadium

May 24, 2003 6	Dallas Burn	1–2	MetroStars	East Rutherford, New Jersey
				Stadium: Giants Stadium

May 31, 2003 7	D.C. United	2–3	Dallas Burn	Southlake, Texas
				Stadium: Dragon Stadium

June 14, 2003 8	San Jose Earthquakes	2–1	Dallas Burn	Southlake, Texas
				Stadium: Dragon Stadium

June 18, 2003 9	Dallas Burn	1–4	Chicago Fire	Chicago, Illinois
				Stadium: Soldier Field

June 21, 2003 10	Colorado Rapids	1–3	Dallas Burn	Southlake, Texas
				Stadium: Dragon Stadium

June 28, 2003 11	Dallas Burn	0–3	Los Angeles Galaxy	Carson, California
				Stadium: The Home Depot Center

July 2, 2003 12	D.C. United	3–1	Dallas Burn	Southlake, Texas
				Stadium: Dragon Stadium

July 5, 2003 13	Dallas Burn	0–0 (OT)	Columbus Crew	Columbus, Ohio
				Stadium: Columbus Crew Stadium

July 12, 2003 14	Dallas Burn	1–5	Kansas City Wizards	Kansas City, Missouri
				Stadium: Arrowhead Stadium

July 16, 2003 15	Dallas Burn	2–1	New England Revolution	Foxborough, Massachusetts
				Stadium: Gillette Stadium

July 19, 2003 16	MetroStars	2–1 (OT)	Dallas Burn	Southlake, Texas
				Stadium: Dragon Stadium

July 26, 2003 17	Dallas Burn	0–3	San Jose Earthquakes	San Jose, California
				Stadium: Spartan Stadium

August 9, 2003 18	Dallas Burn	0–2	Colorado Rapids	Denver, Colorado
				Stadium: Invesco Field at Mile High

August 13, 2003 19	San Jose Earthquakes	3–0	Dallas Burn	Southlake, Texas
				Stadium: Dragon Stadium

August 16, 2003 20	Kansas City Wizards	2–3	Dallas Burn	Southlake, Texas
				Stadium: Dragon Stadium

August 23, 2003 21	Columbus Crew	2–1	Dallas Burn	Southlake, Texas
				Stadium: Dragon Stadium

August 30, 2003 22	Dallas Burn	1–2	Los Angeles Galaxy	Carson, California
				Stadium: The Home Depot Center

September 6, 2003 23	Dallas Burn	1–2	Colorado Rapids	Denver, Colorado
				Stadium: Invesco Field at Mile High Stadium

September 13, 2003 24	Dallas Burn	2–3	Columbus Crew	Columbus, Ohio
				Stadium: Columbus Crew Stadium

September 20, 2003 25	Chicago Fire	0–2	Dallas Burn	Southlake, Texas
				Stadium: Dragon Stadium

September 27, 2003 26	Dallas Burn	2–5	San Jose Earthquakes	San Jose, California
				Stadium: Spartan Stadium

October 4, 2003 27	New England Revolution	4–1	Dallas Burn	Southlake, Texas
				Stadium: Dragon Stadium

October 11, 2003 28	Dallas Burn	0–0 (OT)	MetroStars	East Rutherford, New Jersey
				Stadium: Giants Stadium

October 18, 2003 29	Dallas Burn	0–1	Kansas City Wizards	Kansas City, Missouri
				Stadium: Arrowhead Stadium

October 25, 2003 30	Colorado Rapids	3–4	Dallas Burn	Southlake, Texas
				Stadium: Dragon Stadium

== U.S. Open Cup ==
August 6, 2003 Fourth Round	Dallas Burn (Texas)	1–4	(North Carolina) Wilmington Hammerheads	Wilmington, North Carolina
	Johnson 6'		Johnson 33'; Nylen 52'; Murray 69', 89'	Stadium: Legion Stadium; Attendance: 3,019
