= Dallas Beer Guardians =

Fan group of FC Dallas

- Established: 2011
- Type: Supporters' group
- Team: FC Dallas
- Motto: Sanguinem Sudorem et Cervisiae (Blood, sweat and beers)
- Colors
- Website: DallasBeerGuardians.com

The Dallas Beer Guardians are an independent supporters group of Major League Soccer's FC Dallas and a member of the Independent Supporters Council. The group is named for the Beer Garden section in which they reside at Toyota Stadium.

== History ==
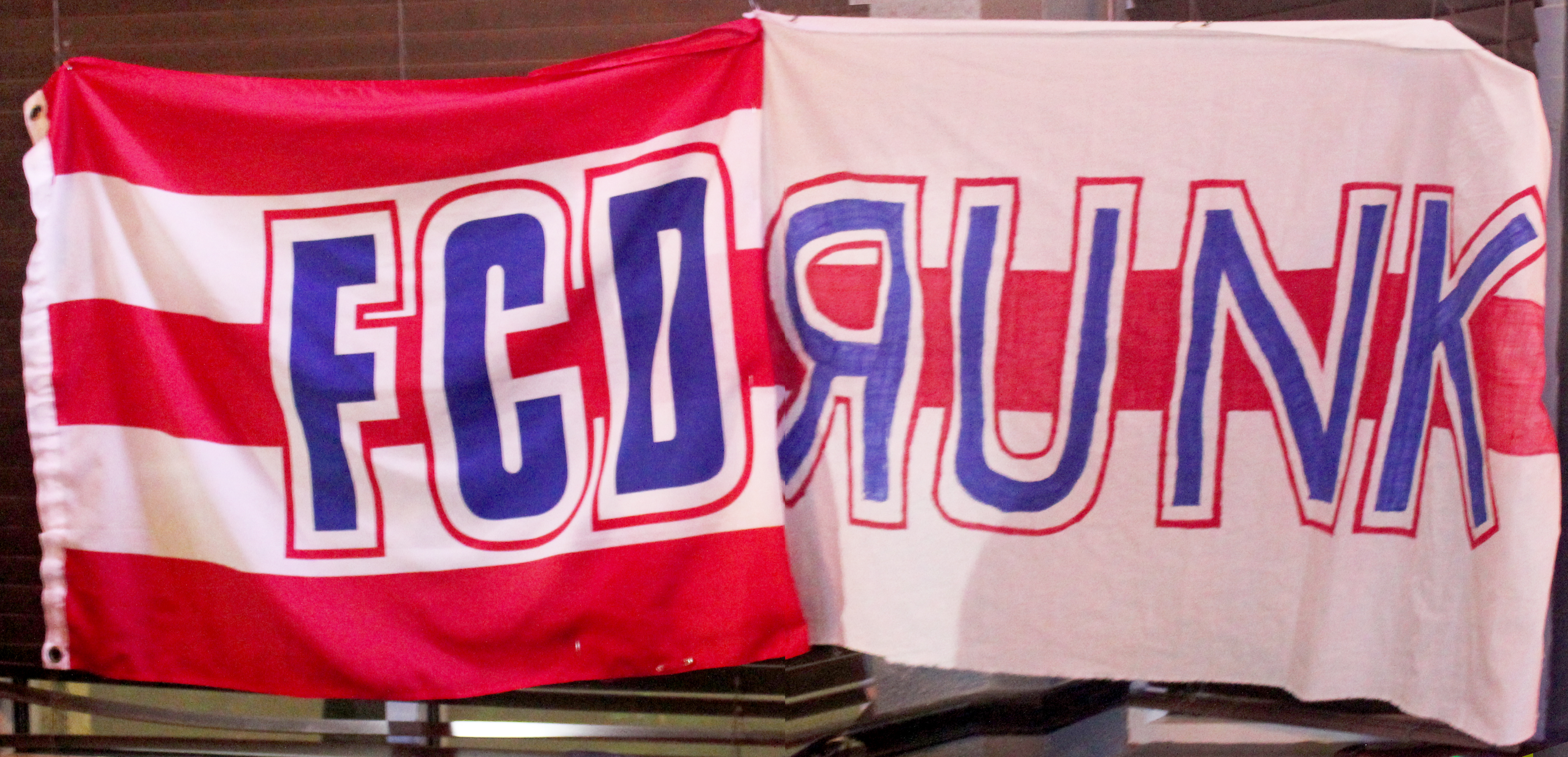
The FCDrunk banner photographed at the Dallas Beer Guardians 5th anniversary event.

The group was founded in 2011 as FCDrunk. Co-founders Andrew Gerbosi, Brandon Beall and Kasey Baker had spent time with FC Dallas' original supporters group, The Inferno, and sought to spread their passionate support to other parts of Pizza Hut Park (now Toyota Stadium), primarily the stadium's Beer Garden section. After a game in which promotional flags were handed out to fans, the trio found a discarded flag and decided to clean it up. By July 2, 2011, the flag had become a banner bearing the mark FCDrunk, where it would hang from the wall in front of the Beer Garden among a variety of team-produced banners of support.

With a modest group providing a rowdy atmosphere in the 21 and up section on the north side of the stadium, it became an attractive option for fans seeking to escape the confines of family sections. By the end of the 2011 season, FC Dallas sought to recognize FCDrunk as a supporters group. The team's president, Doug Quinn, had arranged for sponsorships with team sponsors, Budweiser and adidas, to help fund shirts and scarves for the fledgling group. One issue that was raised was the name, something more responsible than the word drunk was preferred. The group's leadership chose to rebrand as the Dallas Beer Guardians as a play on their home in the Budweiser Beer Garden. By the end of the second year, the group's membership had exceeded 200.

Over the next three years, DBG grew out of a dependence on sponsorship and became fully independent in 2014. The group had begun to provide volunteers for community projects, and became the largest FC Dallas supporters group following the collapse of The Inferno. At this time, the Dallas Beer Guardians also explored the possibility of joining the Independent Supporters Council, an association of 40 supporters groups representing teams in MLS, NASL, USL and the NWSL.

By 2016, the Dallas Beer Guardians had hit 1,000 members and were accepted in the Independent Supporters' Council alongside fellow FC Dallas supporters group, Lone Star Legion. The group also registered as a nonprofit organization as their philanthropic efforts expanded. The 2016 season was hugely successful on the field as FC Dallas won the Supporters' Shield and Lamar Hunt US Open Cup in addition to the Brimstone Cup, the rivalry cup contested between the Dallas Burn (FC Dallas) and Chicago Fire. As members of the Independent Supporters Council, DBG became custodians of the Supporters' Shield for the 2017 season. The group had also inherited its role as one of the designated supporters groups that oversees the Brimstone Cup alongside Chicago counterparts Section 8, and also took possession of the oldest trophy contested in MLS for its time in Dallas.

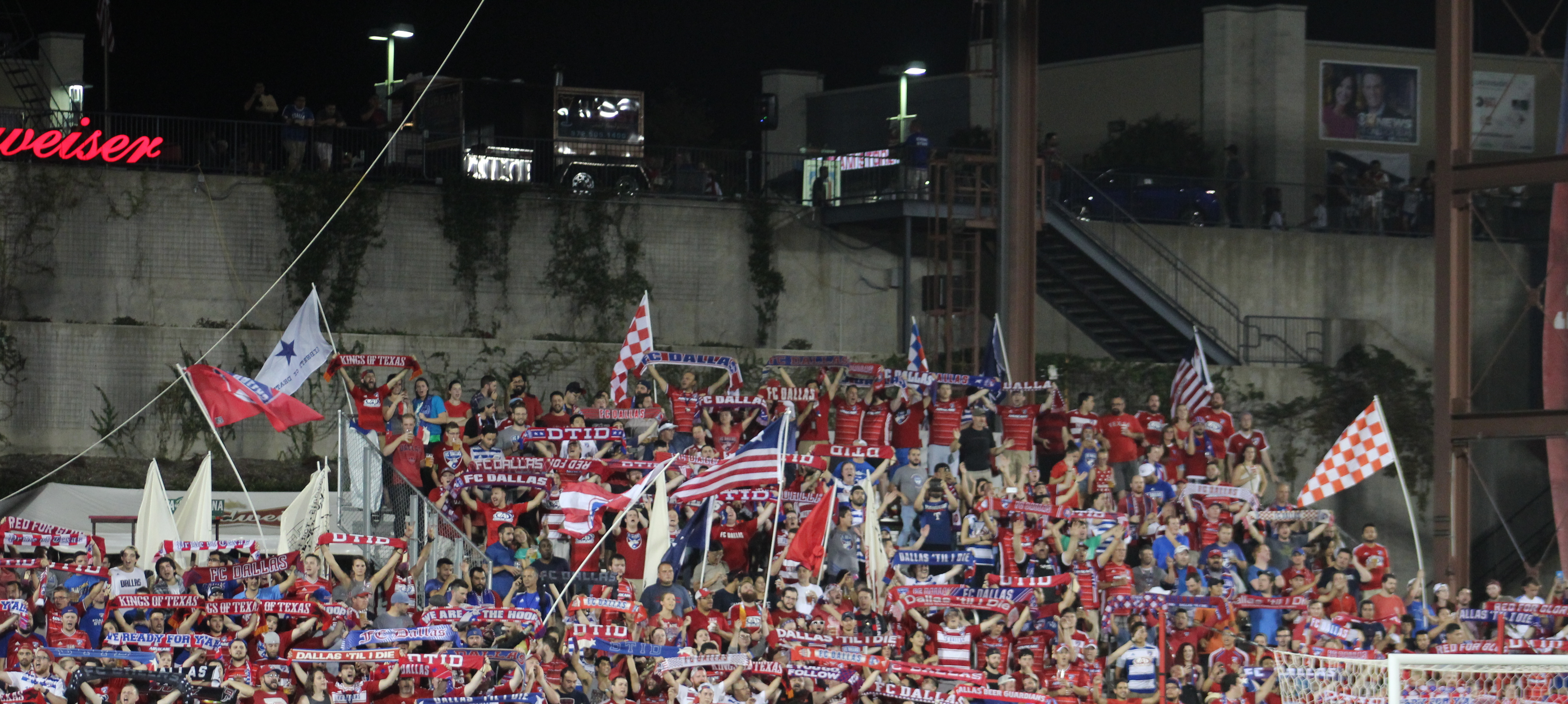
The Dallas Beer Guardians before the 2016 Lamar Hunt US Open Cup final at Toyota Stadium

== Philanthropy ==
The Dallas Beer Guardians have worked with a number of organizations to provide funds and volunteers. In recent years, the group opted to channel efforts to a single partner organization and have partnered with UK-based soccer charity Lionsraw and the Denton ISD G.O.A.L. (Guys/Girls Operating As Leaders) program. The work with G.O.A.L. was recognized by Major League Soccer and Wells Fargo in 2017, with MLS producing a video on the G.O.A.L. Cup and Wells Fargo making a $1,000 donation in the name of the Dallas Beer Guardians.

The group has also helped to raise funds and supplies following natural disasters in the state of Texas. After 11 tornadoes struck the Dallas–Fort Worth metroplex on December 26, 2015, the Dallas Beer Guardians held a drive to purchase emergency supplies for shelters housing people displaced by the storms. In response to Hurricane Harvey in 2017, the group collaborated with Houston Dynamo's Texian Army and the 210 Alliance from San Antonio FC for a cause named 'Enemies For 90...Texans For Life'. DBG raised over $4,000 as the three groups coordinated funds and supplies to help benefit displaced families across South Texas. The three groups were jointly awarded the Philanthropic Group of the Year at the 2018 Independent Supporters Council in Vancouver.

== Player of the year ==
After the final home game of each regular season, the Dallas Beer Guardians award a glass boot trophy to the winner of their online vote for the team's player of the year.

Year	Recipient
2012	(United States) Matt Hedges
2013	(Panama) Blas Perez
2014	(Colombia) Fabian Castillo
2015	(Colombia) Fabian Castillo
2016	(United States) Walker Zimmerman
2017	(Argentina) Maxi Urruti
2018	(United States) Reggie Cannon
2023	(Netherlands) Maarten Paes
