= Dragon Stadium =

Dragon Stadium may refer to:

Football (soccer)

- Estádio do Dragão, in Porto, Portugal

American football

- Dragon Stadium, Southlake, Texas, USA
- Dragon Stadium, Round Rock ISD
