= 2000 Dallas Burn season =

Dallas Burn
2000 season
- Owner: Major League Soccer
- Head coach: Dave Dir
- Stadium: Cotton Bowl
- MLS: Central Division: 3rd Overall: 6th
- MLS Cup: Lost Quarterfinals vs. MetroStars (0–2)
- U.S. Open Cup: Lost Quarterfinal vs. Chicago Fire (1–5)
- Average home league attendance: 13,102
Home colors	Away colors

The 2000 Dallas Burn season was the fifth season of the Major League Soccer team. The team made the playoffs for the fifth consecutive year. It would be the final season that Dave Dir was head coach.

== Final standings ==
Pos	Team	Pld	W	L	T	GF	GA	GD	Pts	Qualification
1	Chicago Fire	32	17	9	6	67	51	+16	57	MLS Cup Playoffs
2	Tampa Bay Mutiny	32	16	12	4	62	50	+12	52	MLS Cup Playoffs
3	Dallas Burn	32	14	14	4	54	54	0	46	MLS Cup Playoffs
4	Columbus Crew	32	11	16	5	48	58	−10	38	

Source: MLS

Pos	Team	Pld	W	L	T	GF	GA	GD	Pts	Qualification
1	Kansas City Wizards (C, S)	32	16	7	9	47	29	+18	57	CONCACAF Champions' Cup
2	Chicago Fire	32	17	9	6	67	51	+16	57	CONCACAF Champions' Cup
3	MetroStars	32	17	12	3	64	56	+8	54	
4	Tampa Bay Mutiny	32	16	12	4	62	50	+12	52	
5	Los Angeles Galaxy	32	14	10	8	47	37	+10	50	
6	Dallas Burn	32	14	14	4	54	54	0	46	
7	New England Revolution	32	13	13	6	47	49	−2	45	
8	Colorado Rapids	32	13	15	4	43	59	−16	43	
9	Miami Fusion	32	12	15	5	54	56	−2	41	
10	Columbus Crew	32	11	16	5	48	58	−10	38	
11	D.C. United	32	8	18	6	44	63	−19	30	
12	San Jose Earthquakes	32	7	17	8	35	50	−15	29	

Source: MLS
Rules for classification: 1) points; 2) head-to-head record; 3) goal difference; 4) number of goals scored
(C) Champion; (S) Supporters' Shield

== Regular season ==
March 18, 2000 1	Chicago Fire	2–4	Dallas Burn	Dallas, Texas
3:30 PM CST	Stoichkov 14', 42'; Brown (yellow card) 48'; Nowak (red card) 62'	Report at the Wayback Machine (archived June 12, 2000)	Kreis 28'; Graziani 55', 85'; Daniv (red card) 61'; Iribarren (yellow card) 77'; Dade 79'	Stadium: Cotton Bowl; Attendance: 12,891; Referee: Brian Hall; Assistant referees: Greg Barkey; Roger Sill

March 25, 2000 2	Colorado Rapids	1–0	Dallas Burn	Dallas, Texas
7:30 PM CST	Moore (yellow card) 47'; Balboa (yellow card) 63' (goal) 80'; Key (yellow card) 85'	Report at the Wayback Machine (archived May 11, 2000)	Eck (yellow card) 49'	Stadium: Cotton Bowl; Attendance: 13,119; Referee: Kevin Stott; Assistant referees: Sergio Vega; Misail Tsapos

April 1, 2000 3	Tampa Bay Mutiny	0–1	Dallas Burn	Dallas, Texas
7:30 PM CST	Kinnear (yellow card) 12'; McCarty (yellow card) 13'; Kotschau (yellow card) 65'; Hernández (red card) 72'	Report at the Wayback Machine (archived August 16, 2000)	Daniv (yellow card) 16'; Iribarren (yellow card) 40'; Kreis 69'	Stadium: Cotton Bowl; Attendance: 11,491; Referee: Rich Grady; Assistant referees: Scott Weyland; Glenn Prechac

April 8, 2000 4	New England Revolution	1–2	Dallas Burn	Dallas, Texas
7:30 PM CDT	Álvarez (yellow card) 30'; Torres 42'; Asad (yellow card) 55'; Chronopoulos (yellow card) 62'	Report at the Wayback Machine (archived August 16, 2000)	Pareja (yellow card) 30'; Graziani 38'; Kreis 74'; Broome (yellow card) 84'	Stadium: Cotton Bowl; Attendance: 14,758; Referee: Alex Prus; Assistant referees: Tom Bobadilla; Zekai Akbay

April 15, 2000 5	Dallas Burn	1–2	Los Angeles Galaxy	Pasadena, California
7:30 PM PDT	Graziani (yellow card) 22' (goal) 83'; Pareja (yellow card) 77'	Report at the Wayback Machine (archived May 11, 2000)	Caligiuri 17'; Fraser (yellow card) 55'; Peña (yellow card) 63'; Mathis 67'	Stadium: Rose Bowl; Attendance: 16,241; Referee: Richard Heron; Assistant referees: Richard Eddy; Alex del Angel

April 22, 2000 6	Dallas Burn	0–5	San Jose Earthquakes	San Jose, California
7:00 PM PDT	Deering (yellow card) 70'	Report at the Wayback Machine (archived May 10, 2000)	Cerritos 10' (pen.), 36'; Brose 14'; Tinsley (yellow card) 37'; Conteh 40', 70'; Wright (yellow card) 42'; Clark (yellow card) 86'	Stadium: Spartan Stadium; Attendance: 8,871; Referee: Gerry Corrie; Assistant referees: Jorge Reyes; Cory Dean

April 29, 2000 7	Columbus Crew	1–2	Dallas Burn	Dallas, Texas
7:00 PM CDT	Washington 24'; Gori (yellow card) 45'; Elcock (yellow card) 54'; Chulis (yellow card) 58'; DeBrito (yellow card) 58'	Report at the Wayback Machine (archived May 10, 2000)	Pareja 13' (yellow card) 35'; Broome (yellow card) 26'; Graziani 37'; Iribarren (yellow card) 52'; Deering (yellow card) 85'	Stadium: Cotton Bowl; Attendance: 15,277; Referee: Ali Saheli; Assistant referees: Craig Lowry; Richard Eddy

May 6, 2000 8	Dallas Burn	1–3	Tampa Bay Mutiny	Tampa, Florida
4:00 PM EDT	Graziani 14' (red card) 66'; Deering (yellow card) 41'; Iribarren (yellow card) 90'	Report at the Wayback Machine (archived October 16, 2000)	Lagos (yellow card) 31'; Diallo 45', 84'; Ralston (yellow card) 64'; Anderson 90'	Stadium: Raymond James Stadium; Attendance: 7,051; Referee: Noel Kenny; Assistant referees: Nathan Clement; Chip Reed

May 13, 2000 9	Los Angeles Galaxy	1–1 (OT)	Dallas Burn	Dallas, Texas
7:30 PM CDT	Peña (yellow card) 11'; Caligiuri 55'	Report at the Wayback Machine (archived October 27, 2000)	Kreis 46+'; Dade (yellow card) 48'; Iribarren (yellow card) 72'; Alavanja (yellow card) 93'	Stadium: Cotton Bowl; Attendance: 20,417; Referee: Gerry Corrie; Assistant referees: Sergio Vega; Misail Tsapos

May 20, 2000 10	Dallas Burn	1–2	Columbus Crew	Columbus, Ohio
7:30 PM EDT	Eck (yellow card) 38'; Kreis (yellow card) 53' (goal) 71'; Dade (yellow card) 89'; Farrer (yellow card) 93+'	Report at the Wayback Machine (archived August 16, 2000)	Washington 10'; Clark (yellow card) 40'; Pérez (yellow card) 58'; West 61'; Cunningham (yellow card) 84'	Stadium: Columbus Crew Stadium; Attendance: 13,548; Referee: Brian Hall; Assistant referees: Cory Dean; Kevin Scott

May 24, 2000 11	Dallas Burn	3–4	Chicago Fire	Chicago, Illinois
7:30 PM CDT	Martinez (yellow card) 17'; Rodríguez (yellow card) 34' (goal) 37'; Daniv (yellow card) 44' (yellow-red card) 66'; Kreis 57'; Deering 63'; Farrer (yellow card) 80'; Alavanja (yellow card) 89'	Report at the Wayback Machine (archived August 16, 2000)	Whitfield (red card) 15'; Wolff (yellow card) 19'; Farrer 51+' (o.g.); Razov 79', 91+'; Kovalenko 89'	Stadium: Soldier Field; Attendance: 5,330; Referee: Ricardo Valenzuela; Assistant referees: Nathan Clement; Cien Asoera

May 27, 2000 12	Dallas Burn	2–3	D.C. United	Washington, D.C.
7:30 PM EDT	Kreis 13', 47'; Pollard (yellow card) 36'; Graziani (yellow card) 39'; Eck (yellow card) 53'	Report at the Wayback Machine (archived August 16, 2000)	Albright 11'; Llamosa 22' (yellow card) 45'; Pollard 75' (o.g.); Cooks (yellow card) 91+'	Stadium: Robert F. Kennedy Memorial Stadium; Attendance: 18,120; Referee: Noel Kenny; Assistant referees: George Gansner; Bill Dittmar

June 3, 2000 13	Tampa Bay Mutiny	3–2	Dallas Burn	Dallas, Texas
7:30 PM CDT	Kinnear (yellow card) 22'; Diallo 5', 29'; McCarty (yellow card) 66'; Valderrama 71' (pen.)	Report at the Wayback Machine (archived August 16, 2000)	Dade 8'; Pareja (yellow card) 28'; Iribarren (yellow card) 31'; Rodríguez 85' (pen.)	Stadium: Cotton Bowl; Attendance: 7,099; Referee: Alex Prus; Assistant referees: Glenn Prechac; Gibby Widner

June 7, 2000 14	Columbus Crew	2–3	Dallas Burn	Dallas, Texas
5:30 PM CDT	West 18'; Pérez 43'; Aguilera (yellow card) 64'	Report at the Wayback Machine (archived January 10, 2001)	Alavanja 11'; Deering (yellow card) 33'; Graziani (yellow card) 64'; Eck 83'; Korol 89'	Stadium: Cotton Bowl; Attendance: 27,815; Referee: Brett Hugo; Assistant referees: Alex Prus; Paul Scott

June 10, 2000 15	Dallas Burn	1–1 (OT)	Columbus Crew	Columbus, Ohio
4:30 PM EDT	Korol 4'; Eck (yellow card) 26'; Alavanja (yellow card) 88'; Deering (yellow card) 91+'	Report at the Wayback Machine (archived August 16, 2000)	Warzycha (yellow card) 33'; Farrell 72'	Stadium: Columbus Crew Stadium; Attendance: 14,925; Referee: Scott Weyland; Assistant referees: Chip Reed; JR Perdue

June 17, 2000 16	Kansas City Wizards	1–4	Dallas Burn	Dallas, Texas
3:30 PM CDT	McKeon 45'; Vermes (yellow card) 56'	Report at the Wayback Machine (archived November 16, 2000)	Graziani 15', 82'; Alavanja (yellow card) 16'; Kreis 66'; Santel 90'	Stadium: Cotton Bowl; Attendance: 7,912; Referee: Paul Tamberino; Assistant referees: Sergio Vega; Glenn Prechac

June 21, 2000 17	Dallas Burn	0–0 (OT)	Kansas City Wizards	Kansas City, Missouri
7:30 PM CDT	Eck (yellow card) 33'; Iribarren (yellow card) 88'	Report at the Wayback Machine (archived August 16, 2000)	Zavagnin (yellow card) 23'; Gomez (yellow card) 75'	Stadium: Arrowhead Stadium; Attendance: 5,675; Referee: Michael Kennedy; Assistant referees: George Gansner; Jose Andrade

June 24, 2000 18	Dallas Burn	0–2	D.C. United	Washington, D.C.
4:30 PM EDT	Daniv (yellow card) 35'	Report at the Wayback Machine (archived August 16, 2000)	Albright 65'; Díaz Arce (yellow card) 33' (goal) 90'	Stadium: Robert F. Kennedy Memorial Stadium; Attendance: 17,186; Referee: Alex Prus; Assistant referees: Nathan Clement; Terry Vaughn

June 28, 2000 19	Dallas Burn	0–1	Colorado Rapids	Denver, Colorado
7:00 PM MDT	Rodríguez (yellow card) 44'	Report at the Wayback Machine (archived August 16, 2000)	Moore (yellow card) 8'; Okoh (yellow card) 18'; Vermillion 55'; Paule (yellow card) 72'	Stadium: Mile High Stadium; Attendance: 4,640; Referee: Kevin Scott; Assistant referees: Paul Scott; Jose Corro

July 1, 2000 20	Los Angeles Galaxy	2–4	Dallas Burn	Dallas, Texas
7:30 PM CDT	Califf (yellow card) 72'; Hernández 82'; Vanney (yellow card) 77' (goal) 91+' (pen.)	Report at the Wayback Machine (archived August 16, 2000)	Iribarren (yellow card) 22'; Graziani 26', 38'; Eck 47+'; Kreis 80'; Broome (yellow card) 91+'	Stadium: Cotton Bowl; Attendance: 19,644; Referee: Marcel Yonan; Assistant referees: Greg Barkey; Misail Tsapos

July 5, 2000 21	Dallas Burn	1–2	MetroStars	East Rutherford, New Jersey
7:30 PM EDT	Broome (yellow card) 15'; Eck 24'; Daniv (yellow card) 38'; Iribarren (yellow card) 45'; Graziani (yellow card) 63'	Report at the Wayback Machine (archived August 16, 2000)	Mathis 31'; Walsh (yellow card) 46+' (goal) 59'; Hernández (yellow card) 65'	Stadium: Giants Stadium; Attendance: 9,193; Referee: Ali Saheli; Assistant referees: Chip Reed; Richard Eddy

July 8, 2000 22	D.C. United	0–3	Dallas Burn	Dallas, Texas
7:00 PM CDT	Williams (yellow card) 22'; Llamosa (yellow card) 85'	Report at the Wayback Machine (archived August 16, 2000)	Dade 13'; Alavanja 36'; Graziani 78'; Pareja (yellow card) 87'; Deering (yellow card) 90'	Stadium: Cotton Bowl; Attendance: 9,394; Referee: Tim Weyland; Assistant referees: Jorge Reyes; Robbie Mann

July 15, 2000 23	Dallas Burn	3–0	Miami Fusion	Fort Lauderdale, Florida
7:30 PM EDT	Graziani 24', 44'; Iribarren (yellow card) 34'; Dade 56'	Report at the Wayback Machine (archived August 16, 2000)	Heaps (yellow card) 61' (yellow-red card) 77'	Stadium: Lockhart Stadium; Attendance: 6,387; Referee: Gerry Corrie; Assistant referees: George Vergara; Reggie Rutty

July 19, 2000 24	Miami Fusion	1–1 (OT)	Dallas Burn	Dallas, Texas
7:30 PM CDT	McKinley 39'; Bilyk (yellow card) 47+'; Kamler (yellow card) 75'; Welton (yellow card) 96'	Report at the Wayback Machine (archived August 16, 2000)	Rodríguez 21'; Broome (yellow card) 56'	Stadium: Cotton Bowl; Attendance: 6,974; Referee: Andrew Barnes; Assistant referees: Sergio Vega; Gibby Widner

August 2, 2000 25	Dallas Burn	2–1	New England Revolution	Foxboro, Massachusetts
7:30 PM EDT	Graziani (yellow card) 17'; Rhine 21'; Deering (yellow card) 23'; Kreis (yellow card) 44' (goal) 67'; Rodríguez (yellow card) 91+'	Report at the Wayback Machine (archived August 16, 2000)	Álvarez (yellow card) 38'; Harris 87'	Stadium: Foxboro Stadium; Attendance: 13,910; Referee: Alex Prus; Assistant referees: John Konstantinidis; Peter Kokolski

August 5, 2000 26	Dallas Burn	1–2	Tampa Bay Mutiny	Tampa, Florida
7:00 PM EDT	Korol 90'	Report at the Wayback Machine (archived August 16, 2000)	Lagos 20', 47'; McCarty (yellow card) 57'; Valderrama (yellow card) 57'	Stadium: Raymond James Stadium; Attendance: 10,327; Referee: Marcel Yonan; Assistant referees: John Konstantinidis; Roger Sill

August 12, 2000 27	D.C. United	0–1	Dallas Burn	Dallas, Texas
7:30 PM CDT	Talley (yellow card) 71'; Williams (yellow card) 79'; Aunger (yellow card) 91+'	Report at the Wayback Machine (archived August 15, 2000)	Martínez 87'	Stadium: Cotton Bowl; Attendance: 10,204; Referee: Noel Kenny; Assistant referees: Roger Sill; Robbie Mann

August 16, 2000 28	Chicago Fire	0–3	Dallas Burn	Dallas, Texas
7:30 PM CDT		Report at the Wayback Machine (archived September 3, 2000)	Korol 25', 67'; Kreis (yellow card) 61'; Pareja 82'	Stadium: Cotton Bowl; Attendance: 4,869; Referee: Kevin Terry; Assistant referees: Paul Scott; Gibby Widner

August 26, 2000 29	MetroStars	6–4	Dallas Burn	Dallas, Texas
7:30 PM CDT	Mathis 3', 26', 40', 68', 83' (pen.); Dooley (yellow card) 53'; Villegas (yellow card) 76'; Jolley (yellow card) 80'; Valencia 88'	Report at the Wayback Machine (archived October 18, 2000)	Graziani 26' (yellow card) 72'; Kreis (yellow card) 35'; Rodríguez 46+' (red card) 77'; Pareja 54' (yellow card) 80'; Martínez 64'	Stadium: Cotton Bowl; Attendance: 12,940; Referee: Ricardo Valenzuela; Assistant referees: Kermit Quisenberry; Misail Tsapos

August 30, 2000 30	Dallas Burn	0–4	Chicago Fire	Chicago, Illinois
7:30 PM CDT	Deering (yellow card) 49'	Report at the Wayback Machine (archived October 18, 2000)	Nowak (yellow card) 17'; Wolff 18', 59'; Beasley 71', 77'	Stadium: Soldier Field; Attendance: 8,256; Referee: Andrew Barnes; Assistant referees: Francisco Sanchez; Cien Asoera

September 6, 2000 31	Dallas Burn	1–0	Los Angeles Galaxy	Pasadena, California
7:30 PM EDT	Rodríguez 37'	Report at the Wayback Machine (archived January 11, 2001)	Ibsen (yellow card) 22'; Hernández (yellow card) 48'	Stadium: Rose Bowl; Attendance: 11,744; Referee: Kevin Stott; Assistant referees: Tom Bobadilla; Roger Itaya

September 9, 2000 32	San Jose Earthquakes	2–1	Dallas Burn	Dallas, Texas
7:30 PM CDT	Solis 59'	Report at the Wayback Machine (archived October 19, 2000)	Graziani 44'; Deering 89'	Stadium: Cotton Bowl; Attendance: 14,833; Referee: Marcel Yonan; Assistant referees: Sharon Wheeler; Misail Tsapos

== Playoffs ==
=== Quarterfinals ===
September 15, 2000 Game 1	Dallas Burn	1–2 (OT)	MetroStars	East Rutherford, New Jersey
8:00 PM EDT	Iribarren (yellow card) 31'; Rhine 57'	Report at the Wayback Machine (archived October 17, 2000)	Petke (yellow card) 4'; Mathis 34'; Myers (yellow card) 81'; Walsh (yellow card) 95'; Valencia 100'	Stadium: Giants Stadium; Attendance: 14,868; Referee: Marcel Yonan; Assistant referees: Tom Bobadilla; George Vergara

September 20, 2000 Game 2	MetroStars	2–1	Dallas Burn	Dallas, Texas
7:30 PM CDT	Myers (yellow card) 10'; Mathis 53', 81'; Villegas (yellow card) 73'; Walsh (yellow card) 88'	Report at the Wayback Machine (archived October 17, 2000)	Iribarren (yellow card) 5'; Jordan (yellow card) 30'; Rodríguez (yellow card) 36' (goal) 82' (pen.); Deering (yellow card) 56' (yellow-red card) 67'; Farrer (yellow card) 86'	Stadium: Cotton Bowl; Attendance: 7,555; Referee: Brian Hall; Assistant referees: Roger Itaya; Albert Echeverria

== U.S. Open Cup ==
June 14, 2000 Second Round	Tennessee Rhythm	0–3	(Texas) Dallas Burn	Dallas, Texas
			Deering 27', 75'; Alavanja 72'	Stadium: Cotton Bowl; Attendance: 477

July 25, 2000 Third Round	Dallas Burn (Texas)	2–0	Minnesota Thunder	Blaine, Minnesota
	Kreis 36'; Alavanja 88'			Stadium: National Sports Center; Attendance: 3,110

August 9, 2000 Quarterfinal	Dallas Burn (Texas)	1–5	(Illinois) Chicago Fire	Naperville, Illinois
	Deering 82'		Wolff 2', 47', 72', 87'; Kovalenko 9'	Stadium: Cardinal Stadium; Attendance: 6,514
