= Erick (footballer, born 1988) =

Brazilian footballer

Personal information
- Full name: Erick Neres da Cruz
- Date of birth: 24 August 1988 (age 38)
- Place of birth: Ilha Solteira, São Paulo, Brazil
- Height: 1.79 m (5 ft 10 1/2 in)
- Position: Defensive midfielder

Team information
- Current team: Olhanense
- Number: 22

Senior career*
| Years | Team | Apps | (Gls) |
| 2009 | Ituano | 3 | (0) |
| 2009–2012 | Estoril | 48 | (1) |
| 2012–2013 | Portimonense | 25 | (2) |
| 2013 | FC Dallas | 9 | (0) |
| 2014 | Deportivo Irapuato | 0 | (0) |
| 2015 | Harrisburg City Islanders | 26 | (0) |
| 2016 | Zimbru Chișinău | 5 | (0) |
| 2017 | Farense | 8 | (0) |
| 2017–2018 | Almancilense | 21 | (2) |
| 2018– | Olhanense | 2 | (0) |
- * Club domestic league appearances and goals as of 5 December 2017

Erick Neres da Cruz (born 24 August 1988) is a Brazilian professional footballer, who plays for Olhanense as a midfielder.

== Career ==
=== Portugal ===
Born in Ilha Solteira, São Paulo, Erick played one season with Ituano Futebol Clube for one season before signing for G.D. Estoril Praia of the Segunda Liga in Portugal. While with Estoril, Erick played in 48 leagues matches while scoring 1 goal. During the 2011–12 season Erick helped Estoril to promotion to the Primeira Liga.

After the season ended Erick signed for Portimonense who also played in the Segunda Liga. During his only season with the club Erick scored 2 goals in 25 games as he helped the club to a sixth-place finish.

=== FC Dallas ===
On 5 July 2013 it was announced that Erick had signed with FC Dallas of Major League Soccer. The club declined the option on Erick after the season.

=== Harrisburg City Islanders ===
On 17 March 2015 it was announced that Erick had signed with Harrisburg City Islanders of United Soccer League.

== Career statistics ==
As of 5 July 2013

| Club | Season | League | | League Cup | | Domestic Cup | | International | | Total | |
| Club | Season | Apps | Goals | Apps | Goals | Apps | Goals | Apps | Goals | Apps | Goals |
|---|---|---|---|---|---|---|---|---|---|---|---|
| Ituano | 2009 | 3 | 0 | 0 | 0 | 0 | 0 | 0 | 0 | 3 | 0 |
| Ituano | Total | 3 | 0 | 0 | 0 | 0 | 0 | — | — | 3 | 0 |
| Estoril | 2009–10 | 20 | 1 | 0 | 0 | 3 | 0 | — | — | 23 | 1 |
| Estoril | 2010–11 | 22 | 0 | 0 | 0 | 6 | 0 | — | — | 28 | 0 |
| Estoril | 2011–12 | 6 | 0 | 0 | 0 | 6 | 0 | — | — | 12 | 0 |
| Estoril | Total | 48 | 1 | 0 | 0 | 15 | 0 | 0 | 0 | 63 | 1 |
| Portimonense | 2012–13 | 25 | 2 | 0 | 0 | 3 | 0 | — | — | 28 | 2 |
| Portimonense | Total | 25 | 2 | 0 | 0 | 3 | 0 | 0 | 0 | 28 | 2 |
| FC Dallas | 2013 | 9 | 0 | 0 | 0 | 0 | 0 | — | — | 9 | 0 |
| Career total | | 85 | 3 | 0 | 0 | 18 | 0 | 0 | 0 | 103 | 3 |

== Honors ==
=== Estoril ===
- Segunda Liga Champion (1): 2011–12
