= 2001 MLS All-Star Game =

Soccer game played in San Jose, California

MLS All-Star Game 2001
- Event: 2001 Major League Soccer season
MLS West	MLS East
(United States)	(United States)
6	6
- Date: July 28, 2001
- Venue: Spartan Stadium, San Jose, California
- Man of the Match: Landon Donovan (San Jose Earthquakes)
- Referee: Noel Kenney
- Attendance: 23,512
- Weather: Clear

The 2001 Major League Soccer All-Star Game was the 6th Major League Soccer All-Star Game, played on July 28, 2001, at Spartan Stadium in San Jose, California. The game ended in a 6–6 tie. It is the only MLS All-Star Game that has ended in a tie (with no penalties or winner decided).

== Match details ==
2001 MLS All-Star Game
July 28, 2001

MLS West (United States)	6–6	(United States) MLS East
Donovan 3', 7', 19', 90+2'; Graziani 26'; Kovalenko 69'	Report	Chacón 28'; McBride 34', 39'; Diallo 53'; Rooney 84'; Catê 87'

Spartan Stadium, San Jose
Attendance: 23,512
Referee: Noel Kenney

West
East

GK		(United States) Joe Cannon	(substituted off) 46'
DF	12	(United States) Jeff Agoos	(substituted off) 46'
DF	17	(United States) Marcelo Balboa	(substituted off) 46'
DF		(United States) Troy Dayak
DF		(United States) DaMarcus Beasley	(substituted off) 46'
MF		(El Salvador) Mauricio Cienfuegos	(substituted off) 46'
MF		(United States) Manny Lagos	(substituted off) 69'
MF		(United States) Chad Deering	(substituted off) 46'
FW	10	(United States) Landon Donovan	(substituted off) 46' (substituted in) 69'
FW	22	(El Salvador) Ronald Cerritos	(substituted off) 46'
FW	20	(Argentina) (Ecuador) Ariel Graziani	(substituted off) 46'
Substitutions:
GK		(United States) Zach Thornton	(substituted in) 46'
MF		(United States) Diego Gutiérrez	(substituted in) 46'
DF		(United States) C. J. Brown	(substituted in) 46'
MF		(United States) Jesse Marsch	(substituted in) 46'
MF	21	(Ukraine) Dema Kovalenko	(substituted in) 46'
		(United States) Matt McKeon	(substituted in) 46'
		(Scotland) John Spencer	(substituted in) 46'
FW		(Mexico) Luis Hernández	(substituted in) 46'
FW		(United States) Cobi Jones	(substituted in) 46'
FW		(United States) Ian Russell

GK	18	(United States) Nick Rimando
DF	(United States) Carlos Llamosa
DF	(United States) Mike Petke
DF	(Argentina) Pablo Mastroeni
DF	(Bolivia) Marco Etcheverry
MF	(Colombia) John Wilmar Pérez
MF	(United States) Preki
MF	(England) Ian Bishop
MF	(United States) Santino Quaranta
FW	20	(United States) Brian McBride
FW	(Honduras) Alex Pineda Chacón
Substitutions:
GK	(United States) Tim Howard
(United States) Mike Clark
(United States) Steve Jolley
8	(Brazil) Catê
(United States) Jim Rooney
(Colombia) Diego Serna

(substituted off) 46'
(substituted off) 46'
(substituted off) 46'
(substituted off) 56'	(substituted in) 74'
(substituted off) 45'
(substituted off) 74'
(substituted off) 46'
(substituted in) 46'
(substituted in) 46'
(substituted in) 46'
(substituted in) 56'
(substituted in) 45'
(substituted in) 46'
