= Dave Dir =

American soccer coach (born 1959)

Personal information
- Date of birth: June 23, 1959 (age 67)

Team information
- Current team: Vancouver Whitecaps

College career
Years	Team	Apps	(Gls)
- Western Illinois

Senior career*
Years	Team	Apps	(Gls)
1980	Chicago Sting		
- Colorado Comets

Managerial career
- 1989–1991: Regis University
- 1991–1994: Colorado Foxes
- 1994–2000: FC Dallas
- 2002–2011: United States U20 (assistant)
- 2011–2012: Vancouver Whitecaps (scout)
- 2012–2014: Colorado Rapids (assistant)
- 2019–: Vancouver Whitecaps (scout)
- * Club domestic league appearances and goals

David Dir (born June 23, 1959) is an American soccer coach, broadcaster, and former player. He played professionally in the USISL and has served as a head coach in the APSL, NCAA, and Major League Soccer, and as an assistant with the United States under-20 national team. Dir was one of the original ten MLS head coaches, coaching the Dallas Burn from 1996 until 2000. At the time of his departure in 2000, Dir had amassed a regular-season record of 81–75–4, which made him the winningest head coach in MLS history until Thomas Rongen overtook him in 2001.

== Playing career ==
Dir played youth soccer with the Chicago Kickers. He attended Western Illinois University, where he majored in broadcasting. In 1980, the Chicago Sting of the North American Soccer League drafted Dir with their first selection in the 1980 NASL College Draft. He suffered an injury in his first season and never played in a league game for the team. He later played for the Colorado Comets in the USISL.

== Coaching career ==
=== Early career ===
In 1989, Dir began his coaching career as an assistant with the Colorado Foxes of the American Professional Soccer League. In 1990, Regis University hired Dir as head coach of the men's soccer team, and his teams won the Rocky Mountain Athletic Conference in his first two seasons with a record of 10-5-2 in 1990 and 9-5-4 in 1991. He was voted the 1990 RMAC Coach of the Year.

In 1992, Dir left Regis to become head coach of the Colorado Foxes. In his two and a half seasons with the team, he won the APSL championship twice, as well as regular season championships each year and the 1992 Professional Cup involving Canadian sides. In May 1994, he resigned as head coach when his wife, who was a flight attendant, was transferred to a new location.

=== Dallas Burn ===
Dir was approached by Major League Soccer, which was preparing for its first season, to become the head of player personnel in charge of all scouting and creation of the original MLS player pool. He was the first employee hired by MLS. Dir worked with Sunil Gulati as a director of player personnel for the new league for two years.

In 1994, Dir left the league position and became the first head coach of the Dallas Burn, a position he held from 1996, the club's inaugural year, until 2000. In 2000, the club fired Dir. He was the longest serving of the original ten MLS head coaches and won the 1997 U.S. Open Cup. Dir remains in the top ten for all-time MLS wins as a head coach with eighty-four.

=== Later career ===
Dir served as an assistant coach with the U-20 men's national team from 2002 to 2011. He was a coach with the team through four cycles of the U-20 program with various head coaches.

In 2002 Dir became a partner and served as president of the Associated Soccer Group, a national soccer education company which operates and oversees the operations of clubs in Dallas, Georgia and Florida.

Dir served as chief scout for the Vancouver Whitecaps from 2011 to 2012. He then was an assistant coach with the Colorado Rapids from 2012 to 2014.

== Broadcasting career ==
Dir became a soccer broadcaster with ESPN and Fox Sports. He hosted World Cup Tonight in 2002 and was a co-host on MLS Primetime. He also provided color commentary for national team broadcasts as well as the MLS Cup on ABC. He has also worked on MLS broadcasts for multiple clubs in the league.

== See also ==
- List of Major League Soccer coaches
