= MTX =

MTX, mtx, or MtX may refer to:

== Automobiles ==
- MTX (automobile), an automobile company in the Czech Republic
- Ford MTX transmission, a 4 or 5-speed manual transaxle
  - Ford MTX-75 transmission, a 5-speed transmission

== Science and technology ==
- Memotech MTX, a series of computers
- Maitotoxin, a biotoxin produced by the dinoflagellate Gambierdiscus toxicus
- Methotrexate, a drug used to treat cancer and autoimmune diseases

== Other uses ==
- MtX (gender)
- Microtransaction, purchasing goods with micropayments within a game
- MTX Audio, a manufacturer of audio electronics
- The Mr. T Experience, a punk rock band
