= Dragon Stadium, Southlake =

Stadium in Southlake, Texas

Dragon Stadium
- Interactive map of Dragon Stadium
- Address: 1085 S. Kimball Avenue, Southlake, Texas
- Coordinates: 32°55′46″N 97°6′43″W
- Owner: Carroll ISD
- Operator: Southlake, Texas
- Capacity: 11,000 (2005)
- Surface: Field Turf

Construction
- Groundbreaking: 1999; 27 years ago
- Opened: 2001; 25 years ago
- Cost: $15 Million USD ($27.3 million in 2025 dollars)

Tenants
- Southlake Carroll Dragons (UIL) (2001–present); Dallas Burn (MLS) (2003)

Dragon Stadium is a stadium in Southlake, Texas, used primarily for American football games. The stadium serves the Carroll ISD, and is the home of the Carroll Senior High School Dragons football team. In 2003, the stadium was used by the Major League Soccer club Dallas Burn before the franchise moved to their permanent home at Toyota Stadium.

The stadium was built in 2001 at a final cost between $18 and $19 million, and shares land with the Transportation Offices for Carroll ISD. The first game played there was on September 7, 2001, a football game between the Haltom Buffalos and the Southlake Carroll Dragons. Before 2003, the stadium could seat 8,000 people, but when the Dallas Burn Soccer Club terminated their lease with Carroll ISD, they left bleachers that they had assembled in the East endzone, increasing capacity to approximately 11,000 people. The endzone bleachers are home to the Carroll Dragon Band and the Emerald Belle Drill Team at home games. The two-story press box is accessed via elevator, with the second floor housing operations and coaches' booths. The first floor is for administration and scouting personnel. The playing surface is artificial and uses many draining features due to how easily the field can flood in heavy rains. In 2006, the home parking lot was doubled in size due to expected population growth. In August 2006, Carroll ISD's school board voted to hold all graduation ceremonies for Carroll Senior High at the stadium. The decision created controversy due to possible weather issues and heat concerns.

In 2006, Under Armour filmed part of a popular commercial called "Click-Clack" at Dragon Stadium. One of the opening scenes shows Green Bay Packers linebacker A. J. Hawk running across the turf at Dragon Stadium.

An interesting feature of the stadium is that, sitting on the north side of the stadium, it is possible to see another local high school football stadium: Mustang-Panther Stadium built in the 1970s, operated by the neighboring GCISD Grapevine-Colleyville Independent School District.

In June 2009, the Carroll ISD school board voted to issue bonds to pay for a $5 million renovation of the stadium. This renovation enclosed both east and west endzones. In 2020, another $4 million renovation was completed.

In 2023, the Carroll Athletic Department expanded student seating from one to three sections.

In June 2017, New England Patriots player Rob Gronkowski snuck into the stadium for a workout that he posted on his social media.
