= FC Dallas =

American professional soccer club based in Dallas–Fort Worth metroplex

- Nicknames: Los Toros (The Bulls); The Burn
- Founded: June 6, 1995; 31 years ago as Dallas Burn
- Stadium: Toyota Stadium; Frisco, Texas
- Capacity: 10,925 (temporary capacity)
- Owner: Hunt Sports Group
- Chairman: Clark Hunt
- Head coach: Eric Quill
- League: Major League Soccer
- 2026: Western Conference: 2nd Overall: 5th Playoffs: TBD
- Website: www.fcdallas.com
Primary colors	Alternate colors

FC Dallas is an American professional soccer club based in the Dallas–Fort Worth metroplex. The club competes in Major League Soccer (MLS) as a member of the Western Conference. The franchise begun playing in 1996 as a charter club of the league. The club was founded in 1995 as the Dallas Burn before adopting its current name in 2004.

Since 2005, Dallas have played in the DFW area's northern suburbs at the 20,500-capacity soccer-specific Toyota Stadium in Frisco, Texas; home games in the club's early years were played at the Cotton Bowl. The team is owned by the Hunt Sports Group led by brothers Clark Hunt and Dan Hunt, who is the team's president. The Hunt family also owns the NFL's Kansas City Chiefs and part of the NBA's Chicago Bulls.

FC Dallas in 2016 won their first Supporters' Shield. In 2010 they were runners-up in the MLS Cup, losing to the Colorado Rapids in extra time. The team has won the U.S. Open Cup on two occasions (in 1997 and again in 2016). Their fully owned USL affiliate, North Texas SC, won the 2019 USL League One regular season and overall championship titles, the third division title in American soccer. The International Federation of Football History & Statistics, in its Club World Ranking for the year ending December 31, 2016, placed FC Dallas as the 190th best club in the world and the ninth best club in CONCACAF.

The Toros' boys' academy is reputed for its player development, having produced several players who have gone on to feature for European clubs and the United States men's national soccer team such as Weston McKennie, Reggie Cannon, Ricardo Pepi, and Chris Richards. The girls' academy has also seen success at the top levels: Monica Alvarado participated in two Women's World Cups for Mexico (2011 and 2015) and Jaedyn Shaw set a record for transfer fee at $1.25M by Gotham FC from North Carolina Courage.

== History ==
=== Dallas Burn era: 1996–2004 ===
Dallas was awarded a Major League Soccer franchise on June 6, 1995, the same day as teams were awarded to Kansas City and Colorado. The team was given its name for the burning in the Texan oilfields and the state's hot weather. On October 17, former Mexico international Hugo Sánchez was designated to the team as their first player. Initially not attracting investors, the Burn was financed by the league itself.

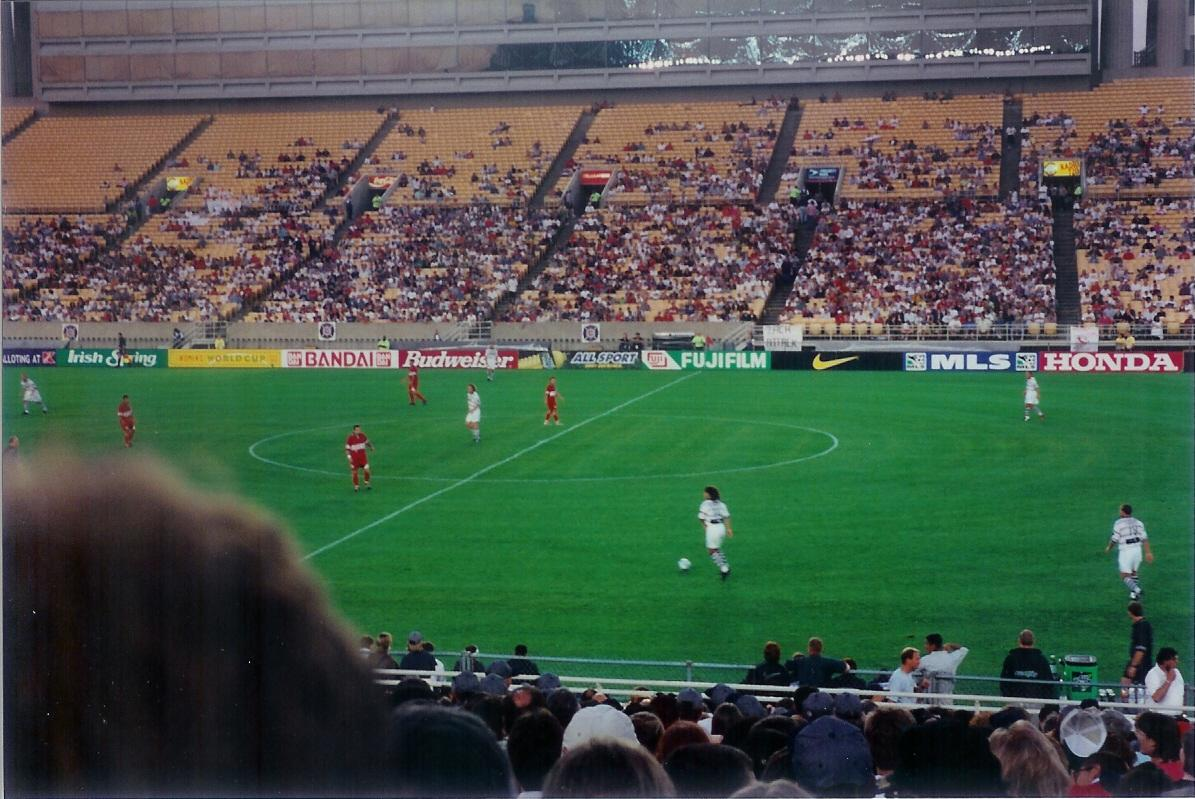
Dallas Burn (in white) playing against Chicago Fire at Soldier Field in July 1998

On April 14, 1996, the Dallas Burn played their first game, defeating the San Jose Clash in a shootout win in front of a crowd of 27,779 fans at the Cotton Bowl. Five days later, Jason Kreis scored the team's first goal in a 3–0 home win over the Wiz. With a record of 17–15, the Burn finished in second in the Western Conference behind the Los Angeles Galaxy. They lost in the best of three playoff semi-finals to the Wiz after three games, the last one being decided by a shootout. Their first campaign in the U.S. Open Cup ended with a 2–3 home defeat in the semi-finals against D.C. United. In their second season, the Burn again reached the playoffs, where they lost in the conference finals to the Colorado Rapids. Later in 1997, they won their first U.S. Open Cup by defeating the MLS Cup champions, D.C. United. In 1999, striker Kreis was voted the league's MVP for a season in which he became the first player to reach 15 goals and 15 assists. That season ended in the playoffs with a defeat to the Galaxy in the conference finals. In October 2000, head coach Dave Dir was fired, despite again taking the team to the playoffs for the fifth consecutive time.

Dir's replacement in January 2001 was Mike Jeffries, who had won the 1998 MLS Cup and two U.S. Open Cups with the Chicago Fire. In his first season in charge, which was cut short as a result of the September 11 attacks, Dallas lost in the playoff quarterfinals to Jeffries' former team. They were also eliminated in the second round of the 2001 U.S. Open Cup by the Seattle Sounders Select, an amateur team from the third-tier Premier Development League. The 2002 season ended with a third-place finish in the West and overall for Dallas, along with an early playoffs exit to the Colorado Rapids. For the 2003 season, the Burn relocated their home games from the Cotton Bowl to the much lower capacity Dragon Stadium (a high school football stadium) in Southlake, which is a northern Fort Worth suburb. The team performed poorly in 2003 and Jeffries was fired in September. He was temporarily replaced by his assistant, former Northern Ireland international Colin Clarke. The team missed the playoffs for the first time, having been one of only two teams to have qualified on all seven prior occasions.

For the 2004 season, Clarke was named the permanent coach and the team returned to the Cotton Bowl, for a campaign in which they again missed the playoffs. In August, club owner Lamar Hunt announced that the club would be re-branded and known as "FC Dallas" to coincide with their new soccer-specific stadium in Frisco for the 2005 season.

=== FC Dallas era: 2005–present ===
In March 2005, FC Dallas signed Guatemalan forward Carlos Ruiz, who had scored 50 goals in 72 games for the Galaxy and earned the MVP award for helping them to the 2002 MLS Cup. On August 6, FC Dallas played their inaugural game at Pizza Hut Park and tied the New York/New Jersey MetroStars, 2–2. Ranked second in the West behind the San Jose Earthquakes, Dallas returned to the playoffs for the first time in two seasons, losing in the conference semi-finals to Colorado in a penalty kick shootout, with Roberto Miña's attempt saved by Joe Cannon. In 2006, the team finished the regular season at the top of the Western Conference, but lost in the playoffs in the conference semi-finals again, leading to Clarke's dismissal. He was replaced by Steve Morrow. In 2007, a third consecutive playoff appearance ended at the same stage with a 4–2 aggregate defeat to fellow Texas club, the Houston Dynamo, who would go on to win their second consecutive MLS Cup. In 2005 and 2007, Dallas reached their first two U.S. Open Cup finals since their 1997 victory, losing both by one-goal margins to the Galaxy and the New England Revolution respectively. For the following two seasons, Dallas missed the MLS playoffs. During the 2008 season, Morrow was replaced by Schellas Hyndman. In 2009, the club signed Bryan Leyva as the club's first Homegrown Player from its development academy.

In 2010, Dallas played in the MLS Cup for the first time, losing 2–1 after extra time to Colorado at BMO Field in Toronto, after an own goal by George John. They were the last of the surviving original MLS clubs to appear in the MLS Cup final. On-loan Colombian midfielder David Ferreira was voted the league's MVP, having missed only one minute of the season, and Hyndman won the MLS Coach of the Year Award.

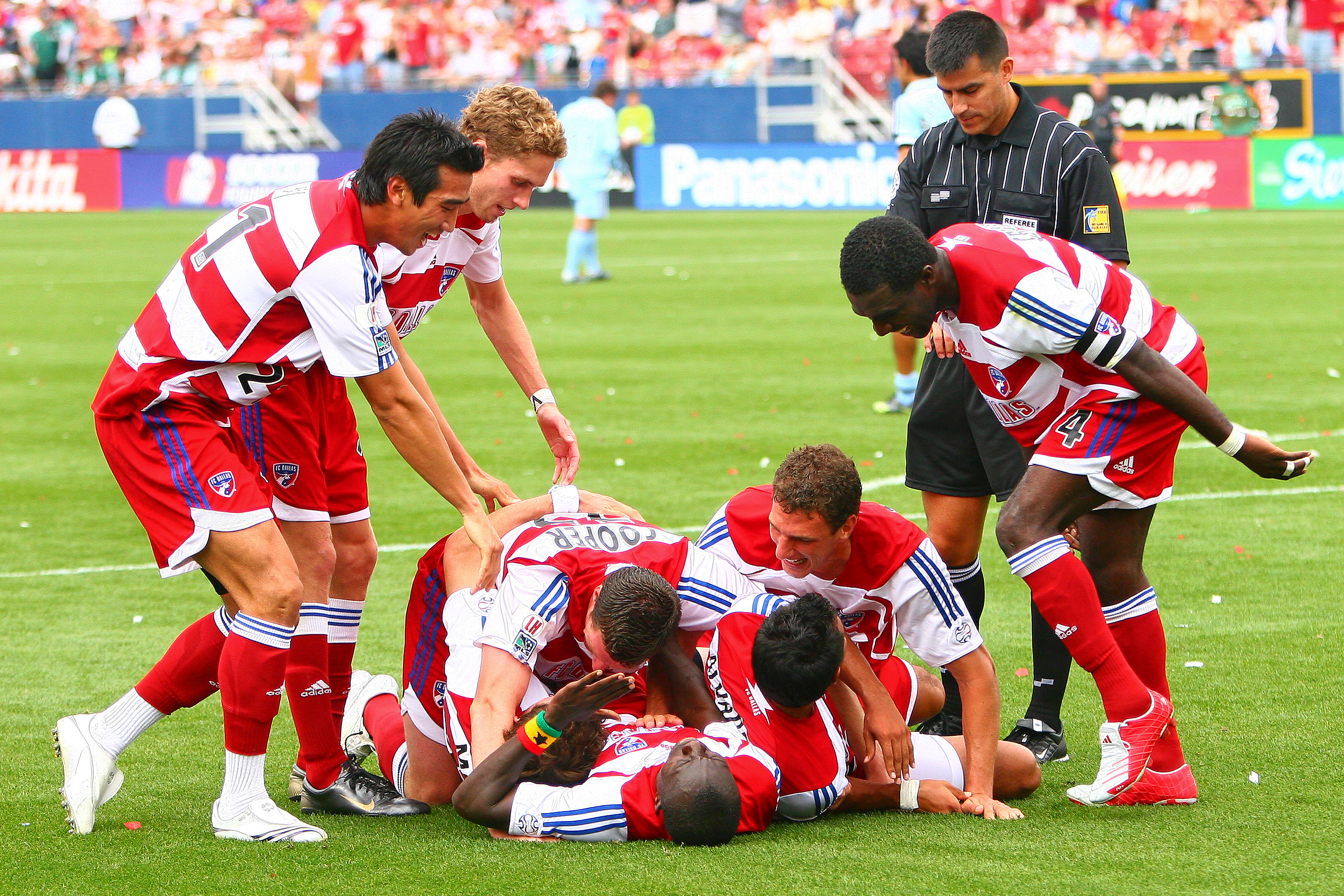
FC Dallas players celebrating a goal scored by Dominic Oduro in a match against Colorado, 2007

By finishing as runners-up in the MLS Cup, Dallas competed in the 2011–12 CONCACAF Champions League, their first time in the leading continental tournament. Following a victory in the preliminary round against Alianza F.C. of El Salvador, they reached the group stage. In the first group game, Marvin Chávez's goal defeated Mexican champions UNAM at the Estadio Olímpico Universitario, making Dallas the first MLS team to win an away match in the Champions League against a Mexican team. The team followed this achievement with a victory by the same score at Toronto FC, but did not win any of their four remaining games and were eliminated from the competition after finishing in third place in their group. In October 2013, Hyndman resigned as head coach after a second consecutive season without making the playoffs.

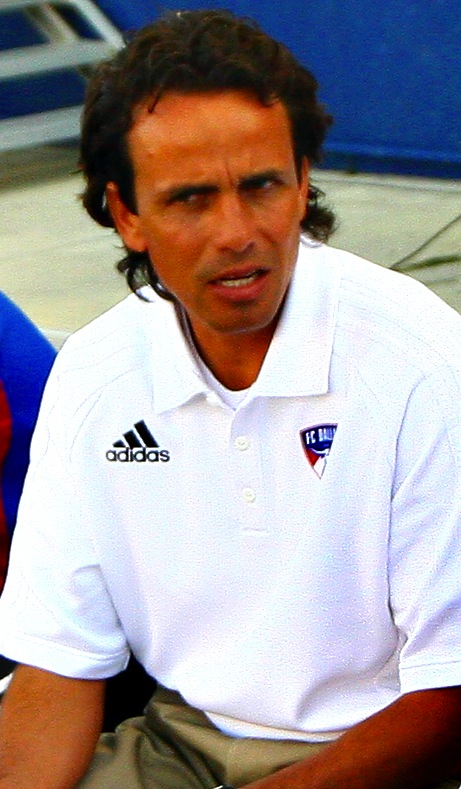
Óscar Pareja coached Dallas to the U.S. Open Cup and Supporters' Shield in 2016

Three months after Hyndman's resignation, his replacement was confirmed to be Colombian and former Dallas player and assistant coach Óscar Pareja, who had resigned from the Colorado Rapids after two seasons as head coach there. Pareja led the club back to the playoffs in 2014. Dallas finished in first place in the Western Conference in 2015. They defeated the Seattle Sounders FC in the conference semi-finals, only to fall to the Portland Timbers in the Western Conference finals.

In 2016, Dallas won the U.S. Open Cup with a 4–2 final win over New England on September 13, ending a 19-year trophy drought. The club ended the regular season with the Supporters' Shield for best record for the first time, but fell to Seattle in the Western Conference semi-finals, 4–2 on aggregate. In the 2016–17 CONCACAF Champions League, Dallas lost 4–3 on aggregate to eventual champions Pachuca after an added-time goal by Hirving Lozano. Dallas lost in the first round of the 2018 MLS Cup playoffs to Portland, and in the round of 16 of the year's CONCACAF Champions League to Tauro of Panama, on the away goals rule. Pareja then left for Tijuana.

Academy director Luchi Gonzalez succeeded Pareja as head coach. He and the players he had brought through the academy were known as the "Luchi Gang". His first two seasons led to playoff qualification and elimination by Seattle, including a 1–0 loss away in the Western Conference semi-finals in 2020, and he was fired in September 2021 with the club struggling to qualify again.

For 2022, Dallas hired a new coach in Nico Estévez, who had been assistant of the United States men's national team. His first season saw the club finish third in the regular season, before a 2–1 Western Conference semi-final loss to fellow Texans Austin FC. His team made the playoffs again in 2023, and he was fired in June 2024 with a 3–8–5 start to the season.

== Colors and badge ==
Originally, the Dallas Burn played in a predominantly red-and-black color scheme, and had a logo which featured a fire-breathing black mustang behind a stylized red "Burn" wordmark. The logo and the original colors of red and black were revealed at an event in New York City on October 17, 1995.

The team re-branded as FC Dallas in 2005 to coincide with their move to Pizza Hut Park in the middle of that season and has since played in a color scheme of red, white, silver, and blue, and a uniform design of horizontally hooped stripes. The colors are officially listed as Republic Red, Lonestar White, Bovine Blue, and Shawnee Silver. Red remained as a primary color in their home uniforms, with blue eventually becoming a primary color of their away uniforms. The club badge was also changed with a bull replacing the mustang. In July 2012, the team wore their first sponsored jerseys, bearing the logo of Texan sports nutrition manufacturers AdvoCare. For the 2014 and 2015 seasons, the hoops were a different shade of red rather than a contrasting white. The jersey also incorporated the motto "Dallas 'Til I Die" on the inside of the collar and the initials "LH" on the back for Lamar Hunt.

== Stadium ==
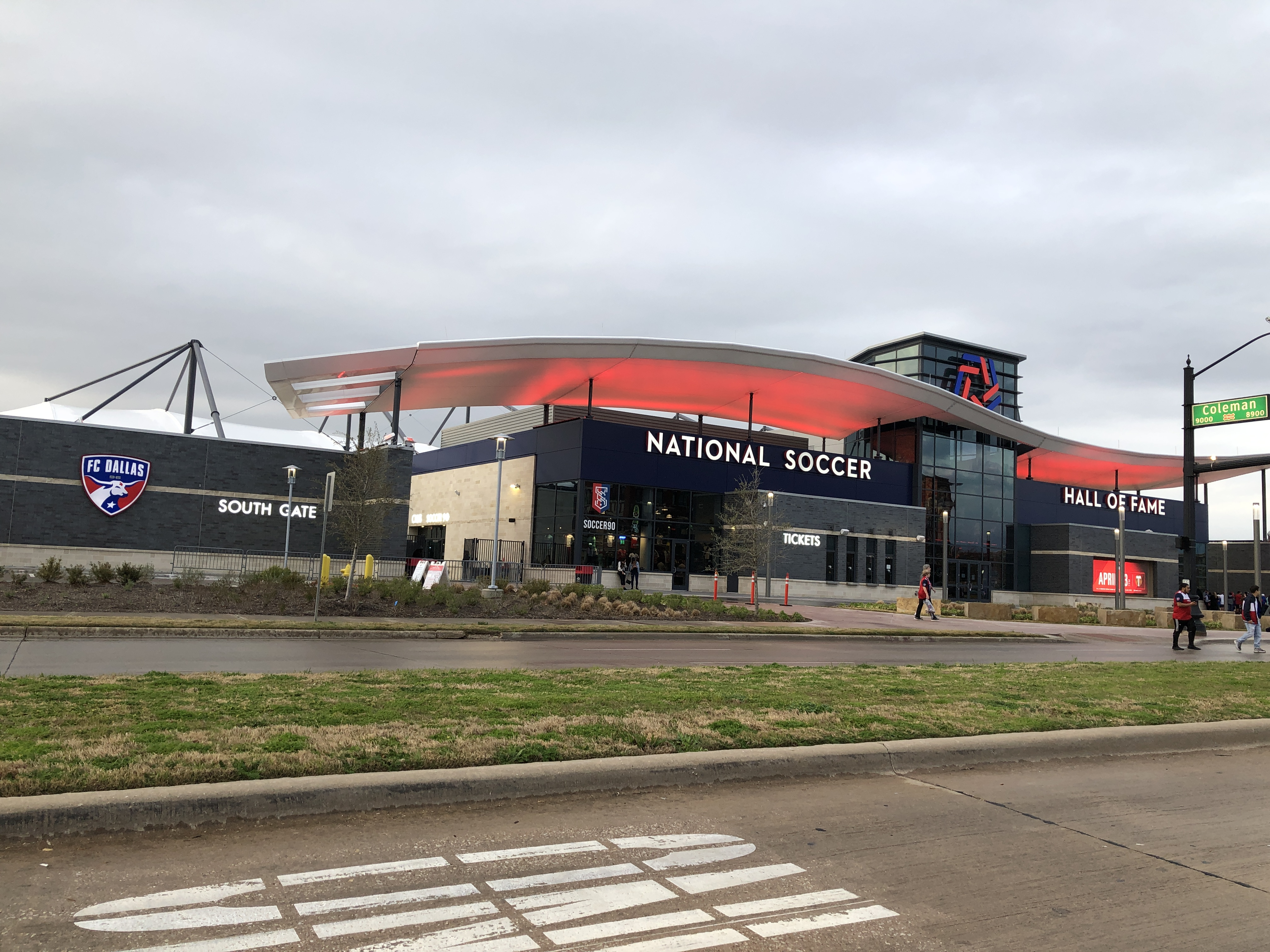
Toyota Stadium in the Dallas suburb of Frisco

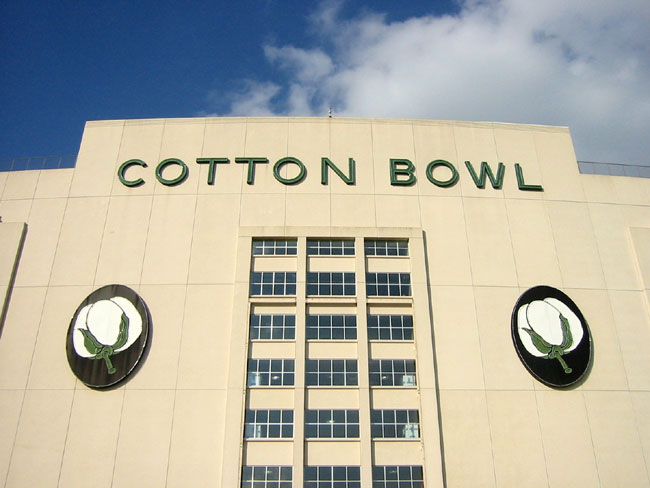
FC Dallas played at the Cotton Bowl from 1996 to 2002; 2004–2005

FC Dallas has had three different home stadiums, each of which has been located in the Dallas–Fort Worth metroplex.

Name	Location	Years
Cotton Bowl	Dallas	1996–2002; 2004–2005
Dragon Stadium	Southlake	2003
Toyota Stadium	Frisco	2005–present

From its foundation, the team played in the 92,100-capacity Cotton Bowl in Dallas. In an effort to save money due to the club's unfavorable lease with the Cotton Bowl, the club played its 2003 home games at Dragon Stadium, a high school stadium in Southlake, a Fort Worth suburb. After listening to its fans, the team moved back to the Cotton Bowl for the 2004 season.

In August 2005, the club moved to Toyota Stadium, the third American soccer-specific stadium in the northern suburb of Frisco. The stadium's south end was extensively remodeled in 2018, including a new home for the National Soccer Hall of Fame.

New Toyota Stadium project

In 2025 construction begun on a $182 million redevelopment of the stadium that is scheduled to be completed before the 2028 season. The redevelopment adds roof structures over the east and west stands to provide additional shade, removing the concert stage, developing a new north stand with standing room for the club's "ultras" supporters, and adding what will be the largest LED board in an American soccer-specific stadium.

=== Uniform evolution ===
- Primary

1996	1997	1998–1999	2000	2001–2002	2003–2004	2005	2006–2007	2008–2009

2010–2011	2012–2013	2014–2015	2016–2017	2018–2019	2020–2021	2022–2023	2024–2025	2026–

- Alternate

1996	1997	1998–1999	2000	2001–2002	2003–2004	2005	2006–2007	2008–2009

2010–2011	2012–2014	2015–2016	2017–2018	2019–2020	2021–2022	2023–2024	2025–

- Third/Special

2001–2002	2006–2007	2018	2019	2021	2022	2023	2025

== Club culture ==
=== Mascot ===
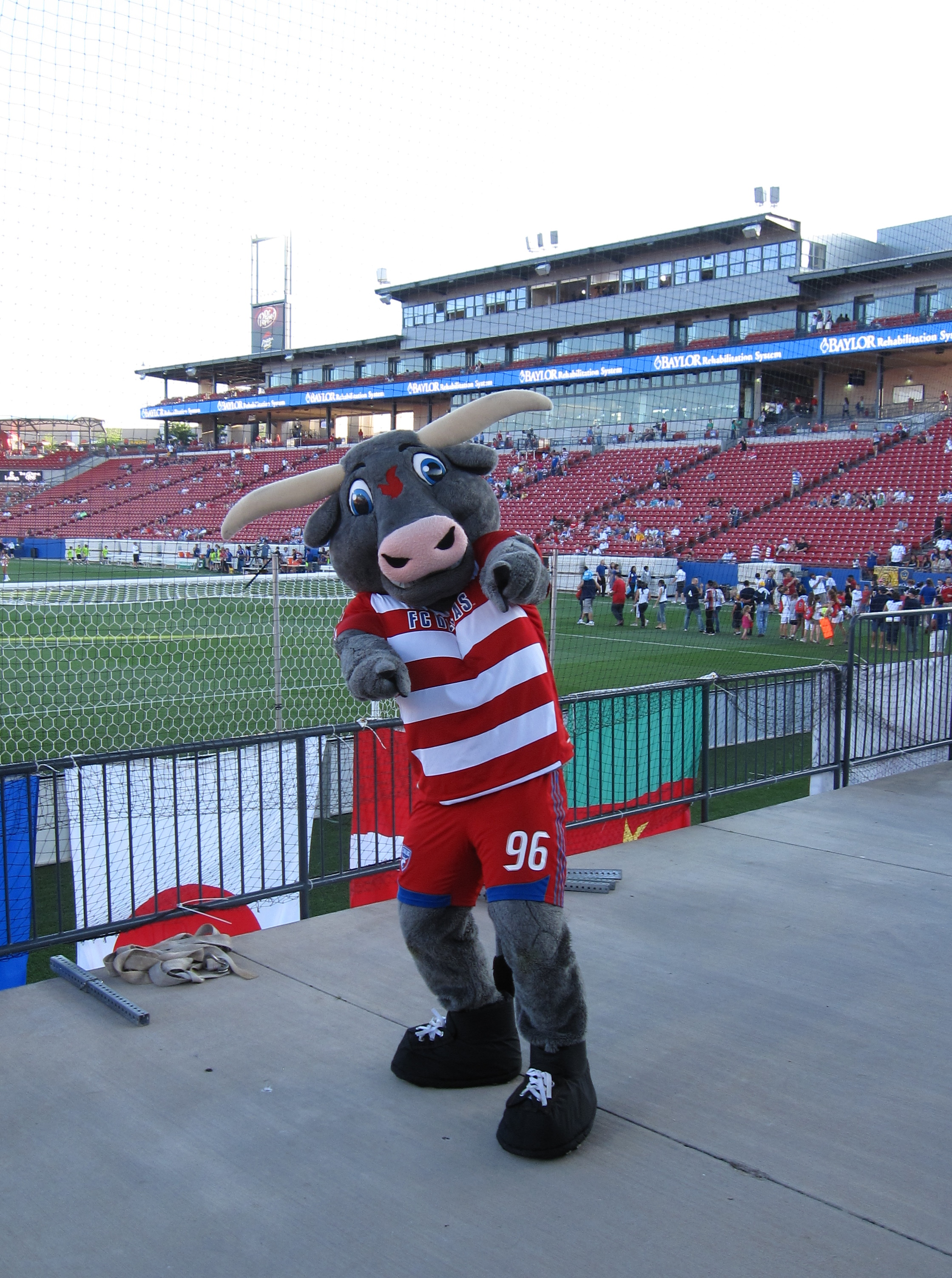
Tex Hooper, the FC Dallas mascot

The mascot of FC Dallas is a bull named Tex Hooper. His fictional biography, by the team, states that he was born on September 6, 1996, in Frisco, Texas.

=== Supporters ===
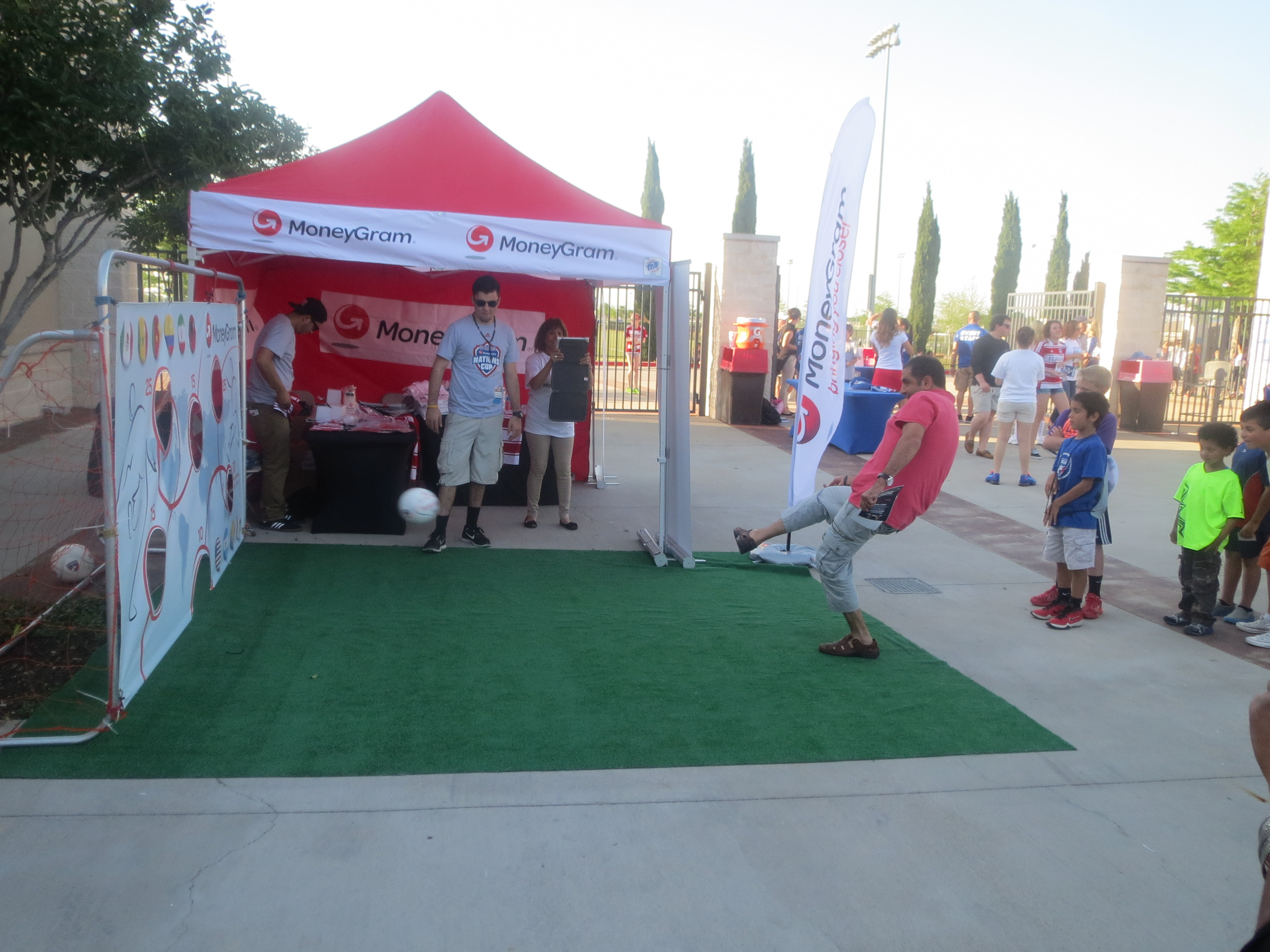
FC Dallas fans enjoy pre-game activities

FC Dallas has two recognized supporters groups: Dallas Beer Guardians and El Matador.

=== Rivalries ===
FC Dallas' main rival is the Houston Dynamo in the Texas Derby. The two teams reside in the same state and compete for El Capitan, a working replica Civil War cannon that goes to the regular season victor.

Animosity grew between fans and players of FC Dallas and the Colorado Rapids, mainly sparking from Colorado players' comments towards the fans and Colorado's victories over FC Dallas in the 2005 and 2006 MLS Cup Playoffs.

In addition to the Texas Derby, the team also competes in two other MLS rivalry cups. The Brimstone Cup against the Chicago Fire, so named for the allusions to fire in both teams' names when FC Dallas was the Dallas Burn, was inaugurated by the fans in 2001. The Lamar Hunt Pioneer Cup has been contested against Columbus Crew SC since 2007. It is named after Lamar Hunt, who was an investor in both teams. Due to league expansion and realignment, FC Dallas only plays Chicago and Columbus once a year now in the regular season, which has led to decreased importance of these two rivalry cups, especially when compared to the Texas Derby.

The Copa Tejas rivalry, which pits all three Texas MLS teams, has enhanced the club's rivalry with Austin FC. The two clubs have played one playoff match, in 2022, which Austin won.

=== Song ===
During a period where MLS created songs for each club, the team anthem was "H-O-O-P-S Yes!" and was performed by Dallas natives The Polyphonic Spree, a choral symphonic rock group.

=== Academy ===
The FC Dallas has produced many talents from the academy including Weston McKennie, Chris Richards, Nico Carrera, Reggie Cannon, Christian Cappis, Jesus Ferreira, Brandon Servania, Ricardo Pepi and Bryan Reynolds. In 2020, they were ranked the number one academy in MLS by David Kerr on chasingacup.com MLS Academy rankings.

=== Affiliated teams ===
FC Dallas was formally associated with Oklahoma City Energy FC of the USL Championship, the second tier of the American soccer pyramid. They were affiliated with Arizona United SC of the USL in 2015. Abroad, the team was previously affiliated to Tigres de la UANL of Mexico and Clube Atlético Paranaense of Brazil.

On November 2, 2018, it was announced by United Soccer League that Dallas would be granted a side to play in USL League One, its newly created third division for 2019. The club then officially announced their name, North Texas SC, and crest on December 6, 2018. The club is owned and operated by FC Dallas and now plays in the MLS Next Pro league.

=== Sponsorship ===
In 2005, Pizza Hut was the title sponsor of the club's stadium and complex when it opened. On June 27, 2012, FC Dallas reached a three-year sponsorship deal with AdvoCare, a Plano-based health and wellness company, worth US$7.5M making AdvoCare the official jersey sponsor. After the 2012 season, Pizza Hut ended their relationship with the club, and the stadium was temporarily renamed as FC Dallas Stadium. In September 2013 FC Dallas reached a long-term deal with Toyota to be official stadium naming rights partners, and the stadium was once again renamed, this time as Toyota Stadium. In October 2014 FC Dallas and AdvoCare announced an extension of the jersey sponsorship through 2020. In February 2021, FC Dallas announced MTX Group, a B2B information technology company based in Frisco, to be its new shirt sponsor, with Advocare remaining as the team's sleeve sponsor. In January 2023, FC Dallas announced a sponsorship deal with Children's Health and UT Southwestern to be its new jersey sponsors.

Period	Kit manufacturer	Shirt sponsor
1996–2000	Nike	—
2001–2004	Atletica	—
2005–2012	Adidas	—
2013–2020	Adidas	AdvoCare
2021	Adidas	MTX Group
2022	Adidas	MavQ MTX Group (away)
2023–present	Adidas	Children's Health (home); UT Southwestern Medical Center

== Broadcasting ==
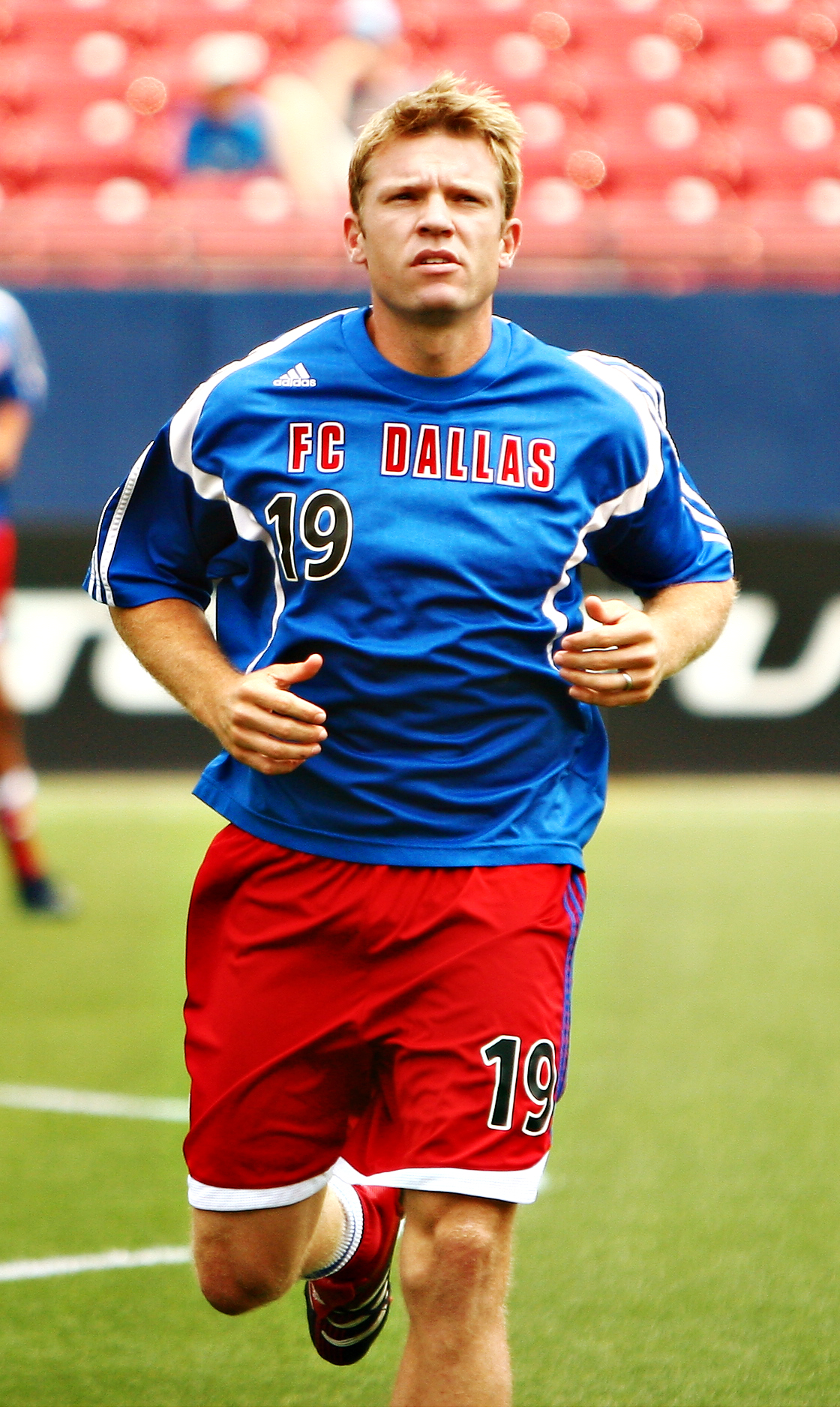
Former Dallas midfielder Bobby Rhine was a play-by-play announcer until his death in 2011

=== Television ===
Since the 2023 season, all live FC Dallas matches stream on MLS Season Pass as part of the league's exclusive broadcast rights agreement with Apple Inc., with selected matches able to be televised by Fox Sports platforms as part of a sub-licensing agreement.

Prior to the all-streaming deal, the club's non-nationally televised games were primarily broadcast in Dallas on local channel KTXA. This arrangement began with the 2015 season. The club struggled for years to find consistent broadcast partners in the crowded Dallas–Fort Worth sports market. In August 2018, FC Dallas launched the FCDTV Network, comprising local stations KJBO-LP (Amarillo), KMYL-LD (Lubbock), KTPN-LD (Tyler-Longview) and KJBO-LP (Wichita Falls/Lawton). Due to scheduling conflicts with KTXA during the return of 2020 Major League Soccer season from the COVID-19 pandemic, select matches of FC Dallas were moved to Fox Sports Southwest.

On February 25, 2013, FC Dallas signed a deal with Time Warner Cable to air most of its games on the Time Warner Cable Sports Channel in Dallas, replacing Fox Sports Southwest as the primary broadcaster of games. This arrangement lasted for two seasons. It was not popular with fans as the channel was not available on many cable and satellite packages besides those offered by Time Warner. The channel still broadcasts some games that are not broadcast by KTXA. Also, in some areas outside of the Dallas–Fort Worth market, the channel continues to broadcast the club's games.

Until the 2012 season, FC Dallas matches appeared on various local television stations such as KTXA and WFAA (digital channel 8.3), and regional sports network Fox Sports Southwest (often on alternate Fox Sports Southwest Plus channels when conflicting with Texas Rangers, Dallas Mavericks, and Dallas Stars games).

In 2012, Dallas Mavericks play-by-play announcer Mark Followill also became the primary play-by-play announcer for FC Dallas, replacing the late Bobby Rhine. Former Houston Dynamo announcer Jonathan Yardley shared play-by-play responsibilities with Followill in 2012. In 2013, Bob Sturm (weekday early afternoon co-host on sports radio KTCK) replaced Yardley, who has continued to fill in for Followill and Sturm in 2013, 2016, and 2018. The color commentator spot was filled until 2016 by a rotation of former MLS players including: Brian Dunseth, Ian Joy, Kevin Hartman, Steve Jolley, and Dante Washington. FC Dallas employee Daniel Robertson or Sturm (beginning in 2016) filled in when one of the others are not available. Longtime national soccer writer Steve Davis has been the analyst on all matches since 2018. Beginning with the new KTXA deal in 2015, longtime local sports broadcaster Gina Miller hosted a team produced 30-minute pregame show on select broadcasts.

In 2021, FC Dallas announced that Estrella TV would become the first team's regional Spanish television partner for the 2021 and 2022 seasons, with matches appearing on Estrella's Dallas affiliate KMPX.

In 2025, invoking an option in the Apple contract that allows for regional rebroadcasts of matches on at least a 48-hour delay, FC Dallas announced that it would air Tuesday-night encores of matches on KDFI under the FC Dallas Rewind branding.

=== Radio ===
Beginning with the 2018 season, English radio coverage of the club's MLS matches has been on the club's website. Beginning with the 2019 season for locally televised games, the radio coverage has been a simulcast of the audio from the television broadcast. Starting in 2023, FC Dallas began originating English language commentary through their website before broadcasting games on Talk Radio 1190AM through the 2024 season. Beginning in 2025 the club began streaming their English commentary on YouTube, creating a second screen experience called "The Burncast" while also broadcasting on their app.

Carlos Alvarado and Rafa Calderon provide Spanish language commentary on radio stations such as KFLC and KFZO. Alvarado has been the play-by-play announcer since the inaugural 1996 season, and Calderon has been the color analyst since the 2001 season. The club discontinued Spanish language commentary ahead of the 2025 season.

== Players and staff ==
For details on former players, see All-time FC Dallas roster.

=== Roster ===
As of September 17, 2026

Note: Flags indicate national team as defined under FIFA eligibility rules; some limited exceptions apply. Players may hold more than one non-FIFA nationality.

No.	Pos.	Nation	Player
3	DF	ENG	Osaze Urhoghide
5	DF	GHA	Lalas Abubakar
6	MF	ISR	Ran Binyamin
7	FW	NGR	Daniel Job
8	MF	ECU	Patrickson Delgado
9	FW	CRO	Petar Musa
10	FW	COL	Santiago Moreno (on loan from Fluminense)
11	FW	ECU	Anderson Julio
12	MF	USA	Christian Cappis
14	DF	SWE	Herman Johansson
15	FW	HAI	Ricky Louis
16	FW	JAM	Nicholas Simmonds
17	MF	BRA	Ramiro
18	DF	USA	Shaq Moore
21	MF	URU	Joaquín Valiente
22	DF	BRA	Álvaro Augusto
23	FW	USA	Logan Farrington

No.	Pos.	Nation	Player
24	DF	USA	Josh Torquato
25	DF	USA	Sebastien Ibeagha
26	DF	USA	Slade Starnes
27	MF	USA	Caleb Swann
28	FW	USA	Samuel Sarver
29	DF	USA	Enzo Newman
30	GK	USA	Michael Collodi
31	FW	USA	Benji Flowers
32	DF	USA	Nolan Norris
33	MF	USA	Clay Holstad (on loan from Rhode Island FC)
34	DF	BRA	Kaka Scabin
36	FW	POL	Daniel Baran
40	GK	CAN	Jonathan Sirois
42	GK	BRA	Daniel
50	MF	USA	Diego García
55	MF	BRA	Kaick
77	MF	TAN	Bernard Kamungo

=== Out on loan ===
Note: Flags indicate national team as defined under FIFA eligibility rules; some limited exceptions apply. Players may hold more than one non-FIFA nationality.

No.	Pos.	Nation	Player
20	FW	USA	Jaidyn Contreras (on loan to Tigres UANL)
—	DF	JAM	Malachi Molina (on loan to Nashville SC)

=== Team management ===
Coaching staff
Head Coach	(United States) Eric Quill
Assistant Coach	Michel Garbini; Matt Watson; Mark Briggs
Goalkeeper Coach	Drew Keeshan
Chief Soccer Officer; Sporting Director	Andre Zanotta
Technical Director	Sandro Orlandelli
Director of Scouting	Leonardo Baldo

=== Head coaches ===
Name	Nation	Tenure
Dave Dir	United States	1996–2000
Mike Jeffries	United States	January 23, 2001 – September 15, 2003
Colin Clarke	Northern Ireland	September 15, 2003 – December 4, 2003 (interim); December 4, 2003 – November 7, 2006
Steve Morrow	Northern Ireland	November 7, 2006 – December 11, 2006 (interim); December 11, 2006 – May 20, 2008
Marco Ferruzzi	United States	May 20, 2008 – June 16, 2008 (interim); September 19, 2021 – December 2, 2021 (interim)
Schellas Hyndman	United States	June 16, 2008 – October 18, 2013
Óscar Pareja	Colombia	January 10, 2014 – November 16, 2018
Luchi Gonzalez	United States	December 16, 2018 – September 19, 2021
Nico Estévez	Spain	December 2, 2021 – June 9, 2024
Peter Luccin	France	June 9, 2024 – November 20, 2024 (interim)
Eric Quill	United States	November 20, 2024–Present

== Honors ==
=== Domestic ===
- MLS Cup
  - Runners-up (1): 2010
- U.S. Open Cup
  - Champions (2): 1997, 2016
  - Runners-up (2): 2005, 2007
- Supporters' Shield
  - Champions (1): 2016
  - Runners-up (2): 2006, 2015
- Western Conference (Playoff)
  - Champions (1): 2010
  - Runners-up (3): 1997, 1999, 2015
- Western Conference (Regular Season)
  - Champions (3): 2006, 2015, 2016
  - Runners-up (3): 1996, 1999, 2005

=== State ===
- Copa Tejas (Division 1)
  - Champions (3): 2021, 2024, 2026
  - Runners-up (2): 2022, 2025

=== Friendly ===
- Atlantic Cup
  - Champions (1): 2026

== Record ==
=== Year-by-year ===
This is a partial list of the last five seasons completed by FC Dallas. For the full season-by-season history, see List of FC Dallas seasons.

Season	League									Position		Playoffs	USOC	Continental			Average attendance	Top goalscorer(s)	
Season	Pld	W	L	D	GF	GA	GD	Pts	PPG	Conf.	Overall	Playoffs	USOC	CCL	LC	Other(s)	Average attendance	Name(s)	Goals
**2021**	34	7	15	12	47	56	−9	33	0.91	11th	23rd	DNQ	NH	DNQ	NH		13,418	(United States) Ricardo Pepi	13
**2022**	34	14	9	11	48	37	+11	53	1.56	3rd	7th	QF	Ro32	DNQ	NH		16,615	(United States) Jesús Ferreira	18
**2023**	34	11	10	13	42	38	+4	46	1.35	7th	14th	R1	Ro32	DNQ	Ro16		18,287	(United States) Jesús Ferreira	14
**2024**	34	11	15	8	54	56	−2	41	1.21	11th	19th	DNQ	QF	DNQ	GS		19,096	(Croatia) Petar Musa	17
**2025**	34	11	12	11	52	55	−3	44	1.29	7th	16th	R1	Ro16	DNQ	DNQ		11,013	(Croatia) Petar Musa	19

1. Avg. attendance include statistics from league matches only.
2. Top goalscorer(s) includes all goals scored in League, MLS Cup Playoffs, U.S. Open Cup, MLS is Back Tournament, CONCACAF Champions League, Leagues Cup, FIFA Club World Cup, and other competitive continental matches.

==== MLS Scoring Champion/Golden Boot ====
The following players have won the MLS Scoring Champion or Golden Boot.

Player	Season	Points / goals
(United States) Jason Kreis	1999	51
(United States) Jeff Cunningham	2009	17

=== Top goalscorers ===
As of October 24, 2026
Active player name(s) in bold

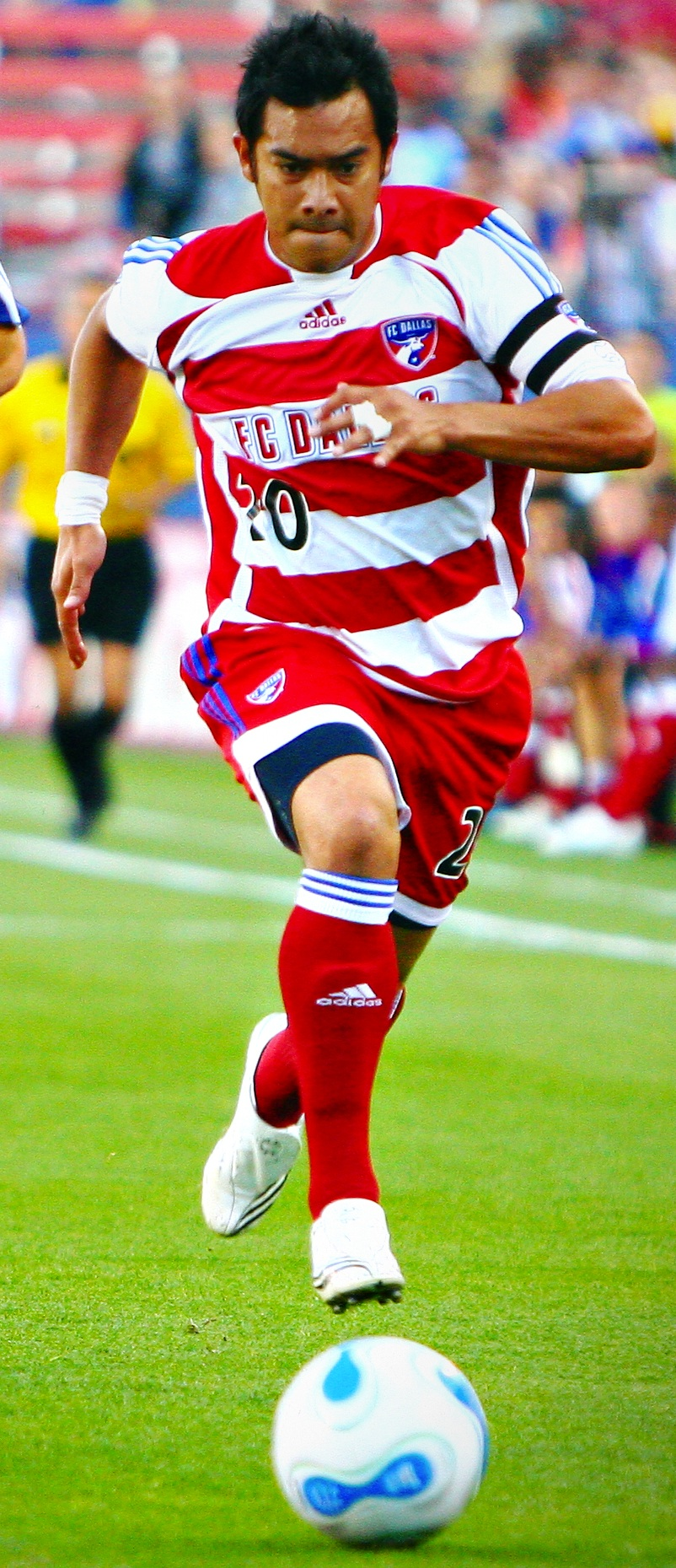
Carlos Ruiz was FC Dallas's top scorer in 2005, 2006 and 2007

#	Name	Career	MLS	MLS Cup Playoffs	U.S. Open Cup	CCL	Leagues Cup	Total
1	(United States) Jason Kreis	1996–2004	91	3	3	0	0	97
2	(Croatia) **Petar Musa**	**2024–Present**	56	1	1	0	1	59
3	(United States) Jesús Ferreira	2017–2024	53	1	0	0	1	55
4	(United States) Kenny Cooper	2006–2009; 2013	46	0	3	0	0	49
5	(Panama) Blas Pérez	2012–2015	36	1	5	0	0	42
6	(Guatemala) Carlos Ruiz	2005–2007; 2016	32	5	0	2	0	39
6	(Colombia) Fabián Castillo	2011–2016	34	1	4	0	0	39
8	(Colombia) Michael Barrios	2015–2020	31	0	4	2	0	37
9	(Argentina) Ariel Graziani	1999; 2000–2001	30	5	0	0	0	35
9	(Argentina) Maximiliano Urruti	2016–2018	29	1	3	2	0	35

=== International competition ===
- **1998 CONCACAF Cup Winners' Cup**

Group stage v. (Mexico) Necaxa – 1–4
Group stage v. (Mexico) Cruz Azul – 1–2

- **2004 La Manga Cup**

Group stage v. (Norway) Odd Grenland – 1–2
Group stage v. (Ukraine) Dynamo Kyiv – 2–2
Semi-finals v. (Norway) Stabæk – 2–1
Fifth place match v. (Norway) Bodø/Glimt – 1–3

- **2007 North American SuperLiga**

Group stage v. (Mexico) Guadalajara – 1–1
Group stage v. (Mexico) Pachuca – 1–1
Group stage v. (United States) Los Angeles Galaxy – 5–6

- **2011–12 CONCACAF Champions League**

Preliminary round v. (El Salvador) Alianza – 1–0
Preliminary round v. (El Salvador) Alianza – 1–0
Group stage v. (Mexico) UNAM – 1–0
Group stage v. (Canada) Toronto FC – 1–0
Group stage v. (Panama) Tauro F.C. – 1–1
Group stage v. (Mexico) UNAM – 0–2
Group stage v. (Panama) Tauro F.C. – 3–5
Group stage v. (Canada) Toronto FC – 0–3

- **2016–17 CONCACAF Champions League**

Group stage v. (Nicaragua) Real Estelí – 2–1
Group stage v. (Nicaragua) Real Estelí – 1–1
Group stage v. (Guatemala) Suchitepéquez – 0–0
Group stage v. (Guatemala) Suchitepéquez – 5–2
Quarter-finals v. (Panama) Árabe Unido – 4–0
Quarter-finals v. (Panama) Árabe Unido – 1–2
Semi-finals v. (Mexico) Pachuca – 2–1
Semi-finals v. (Mexico) Pachuca – 1–3

- **2018 CONCACAF Champions League**

Round of 16 v. (Panama) Tauro F.C. – 0–1
Round of 16 v. (Panama) Tauro F.C. – 3–2
