= Fabián Castillo =

Colombian footballer (born 1992)

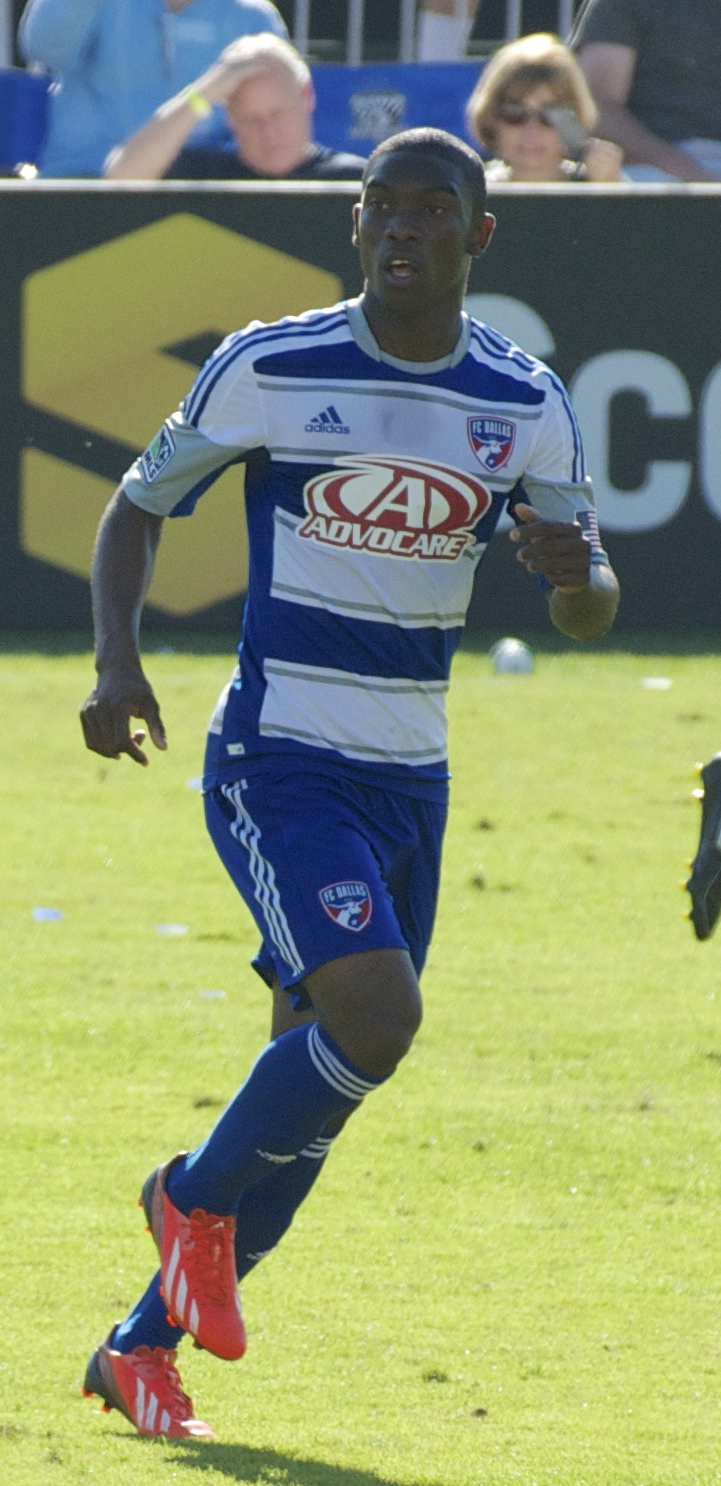
- Castillo with FC Dallas

Personal information
- Full name: Fabián Andrés Castillo Sánchez
- Date of birth: 17 June 1992 (age 34)
- Place of birth: Cali, Colombia
- Height: 1.71 m (5 ft 7 in)
- Position: Forward

Team information
- Current team: Inter Palmira

Youth career
- Deportivo Cali

Senior career*
Years	Team	Apps	(Gls)
2010–2011	Deportivo Cali	18	(5)
2011–2016	FC Dallas	159	(34)
2016–2018	Trabzonspor	38	(3)
2018–2024	Tijuana	63	(7)
2019–2020	→ Querétaro (loan)	28	(5)
2021–2022	→ Juárez (loan)	26	(0)
2023	→ Colo-Colo (loan)	12	(2)
2024	→ Deportivo Cali (loan)	12	(1)
2025	Deportivo Cali	34	(1)
2026–	Inter Palmira	3	(0)

International career
2009–2010	Colombia U17	5	(1)
2011–2012	Colombia U20	9	(0)
2015	Colombia	3	(0)
- * Club domestic league appearances and goals as of 21 June 2026

Fabián Andrés Castillo Sánchez (born 17 June 1992) is a Colombian professional footballer who plays as a forward for Categoría Primera B club Inter Palmira.

== Club career ==
=== Deportivo Cali ===
Castillo started his career in the youth ranks of Colombian side Deportivo Cali. In 2010, he joined the first team and became an important player for the club. On 18 July 2010, he scored his first professional goal in a 1–1 draw against Deportes Tolima. In his first year with the club, he appeared in 18 league matches and scored 3 goals. He also was able to help the club capture the 2010 Copa Colombia.

=== FC Dallas ===
On 3 March 2011, it was reported by Colombian news site El País, and later confirmed by FC Dallas Academy Director Óscar Pareja, that a deal had been reached to bring Castillo to FC Dallas on a 3-year deal. The report stated the transfer fee was US$800,000 and that FC Dallas would own 50% of the player's rights, while Deportivo Cali would retain the other half. FC Dallas confirmed the signing of Castillo on 7 March 2011. Terms were undisclosed.

Castillo debuted for Dallas on 26 March 2011, in a 2–1 loss to the San Jose Earthquakes. Castillo was named to the MLS Team of Week 9 in the 2011 MLS season for his play against Philadelphia Union and Toronto FC. He scored his first goal for the club against the Los Angeles Galaxy on 1 May 2011.

On 10 February 2015, FC Dallas announced that Castillo was signed to a new five-year contract. Per league and team policy, the terms of the agreement were not to be disclosed. On Saturday, 18 July 2015, it was announced that Castillo would be part of the 2015 AT&T MLS All-Star team that would play against Tottenham Hotspur. On Wednesday, July 29, Castillo came on at halftime and played a full 45 minutes.

=== Trabzonspor ===
On August 4, 2016, Trabzonspor announced they had acquired Castillo on a six-month loan for an upfront payment of $3 million and an option to buy in January for an additional $1–1.5 million. Trabzonspor opted to make the deal permanent on January 7, 2017.

=== Tijuana ===
On July 26, 2018, Castillo signed for Liga MX side Club Tijuana.

=== Colo-Colo (loan) ===
In 2023, he played on loan for Chilean Primera División club Colo-Colo.

== International career ==
Castillo has participated in various youth national teams for Colombia, including the Under-17 and Under-20 national team. He made his senior international debut in a draw with Peru on September 8, 2015.

== Style of play ==
Castillo is mainly known for his quick feet and dribbling skills.

== Personal life ==
Castillo earned his U.S. green card in July 2015. This status qualifies him as a domestic player for MLS roster purposes.

== Career statistics ==
Club	Season	League		League cup		Domestic cup		Continental		Total	
Club	Season	Apps	Goals	Apps	Goals	Apps	Goals	Apps	Goals	Apps	Goals
Deportivo Cali	2010	17	3	0	0	0	0	0	0	17	3
Deportivo Cali	2011	1	0	0	0	0	0	0	0	1	0
Deportivo Cali	Total	18	3	0	0	0	0	0	0	18	3
FC Dallas	2011	21	2	1	0	0	0	4	0	26	2
FC Dallas	2012	26	6	0	0	1	0	0	0	27	6
FC Dallas	2013	33	2	0	0	3	0	0	0	36	2
FC Dallas	2014	27	10	3	0	4	4	0	0	34	14
FC Dallas	2015	30	9	4	1	1	0	0	0	35	10
FC Dallas	2016	22	5	0	0	2	1	0	0	24	6
FC Dallas	Total	159	34	8	1	10	5	4	0	181	40
Career total		177	37	8	1	10	5	4	0	199	43

== Honors ==
Individual

- MLS Best XI: 2015
