= 2001 D.C. United season =

D.C. United
2001 season
- General manager: Dave Kasper
- Head coach: Thomas Rongen
- Stadium: RFK Stadium
- MLS: 10th
- U.S. Open Cup: Semifinals
- CONCACAF Giants Cup: Runners-Up
- Top goalscorer: League: All: Abdul Thompson Conteh (14)
Home colors	Away colors	Third colors

The 2001 D.C. United season was the clubs' seventh year of existence, as well as their sixth season in Major League Soccer.

For the second-consecutive year in franchise history, United failed to qualify for the MLS Cup Playoffs, previously winning in making the finals in the four tournaments beforehand. The club also played in the CONCACAF Giants Cup where they finished second to Club America of Mexico.

United's MLS regular season was cut short after 26 matches due to the September 11 attacks, it would the last time a United game was suspended until the COVID-19 pandemic in 2020.

== Background ==
The 2000 D.C. United season marked the first time in club history that the franchise failed to not only reach the MLS Cup final, but failed to make the MLS Cup Playoffs altogether. Throughout the club's fifth ever campaign, United posted a losing record of eight wins, eighteen losses and six ties; earning the eleventh best record in the twelve-team league. Despite the poor performance, Dutch manager, Thomas Rongen, remained at the helm of the club coaching staff.

== Competitions ==
=== Major League Soccer ===
==== Standings ====
Pos	Team	Pld	W	L	T	GF	GA	GD	Pts	Qualification
1	Miami Fusion	26	16	5	5	57	36	+21	53	MLS Cup Playoffs
2	MetroStars	26	13	10	3	38	35	+3	42	MLS Cup Playoffs
3	New England Revolution	27	7	14	6	35	52	−17	27	
4	D.C. United	26	8	16	2	42	50	−8	26	

Source: MLS

Pos	Team	Pld	W	L	T	GF	GA	GD	Pts	PPG	Qualification
1	Miami Fusion (S)	26	16	5	5	57	36	+21	53	2.04	CONCACAF Champions' Cup
2	Chicago Fire	27	16	6	5	50	30	+20	53	1.96	
3	Los Angeles Galaxy	26	14	7	5	52	36	+16	47	1.81	
4	Columbus Crew	26	13	7	6	49	36	+13	45	1.73	
5	San Jose Earthquakes (C)	26	13	7	6	47	29	+18	45	1.73	CONCACAF Champions' Cup
6	MetroStars	26	13	10	3	38	35	+3	42	1.62	
7	Dallas Burn	26	10	11	5	48	47	+1	35	1.35	
8	Kansas City Wizards	27	11	13	3	33	53	−20	36	1.33	
9	New England Revolution	27	7	14	6	35	52	−17	27	1.00	
10	D.C. United	26	8	16	2	42	50	−8	26	1.00	
11	Colorado Rapids	26	5	13	8	36	47	−11	23	0.88	
12	Tampa Bay Mutiny	27	4	21	2	32	68	−36	14	0.52	

Source: MLS
Rules for classification: 1) points per game; 2) total goal differential per match played; 3) total goals scored per match played; 4) away record; 5) away goal differential; 6) total goals scored in away matches; 7) home record; 8) home goal differential; 9) total goals scored in home matches; 10) fewest disciplinary points per match played; 6) away goal differential per away match played; 11) coin toss or drawing of lots.
(C) Champion; (S) Supporters' Shield

==== Results summary ====
Overall								Home						Away					
Pld	W	D	L	GF	GA	GD	Pts	W	D	L	GF	GA	GD	W	D	L	GF	GA	GD
26	8	2	16	42	50	−8	26	6	2	4	26	19	+7	2	0	12	16	31	−15

==== Results by round ====
Round	1	2	3	4	5	6	7	8	9	10	11	12	13	14	15	16	17	18	19	20	21	22	23	24	25	26	27	28
Stadium	H	A	H	A	H	H	A	A	H	A	H	A	A	H	A	H	A	A	A	H	A	H	A	H	H	A	H	H
Result	W	L	W	L	W	L	L	L	L	L	W	W	L	D	L	L	W	L	L	D	L	L	L	W	W	L	C	C

Source: FBREF.com
A = Away; H = Home; W = Win; D = Draw; L = Loss; C = Cancelled

==== Match results ====
April 7, 2001 1	D.C. United	3–2	Kansas City Wizards	Washington, D.C.
	Convey 33'; Watson (yellow card) 51'; Arce 65' (pen.); Talley (yellow card) 69'; Lisi 88'	Report	Lassiter 18'; McKeon 44'; Garcia (red card) 64'	Stadium: RFK Stadium; Referee: Tim Weyland

April 14, 2001 2	Chicago Fire	2–0	D.C. United	Chicago, Illinois
	Evans (yellow card) 49'; Wolff 57'; Kovalenko 78', (yellow card) 90+1'	Report	Albright (yellow card) 39'; Talley (yellow card) 56'; Convey (yellow card) 66'; Etcheverry (yellow card) 77' (red card) 90+1'	Stadium: Soldier Field; Referee: Gerry Corrie

April 21, 2001 3	D.C. United	2–1	New England Revolution	Washington, D.C.
	Conteh 9', 61'	Report	Okoh 49'; Harkes (yellow card) 51'; Torres (yellow card) 62'; Pierce (yellow card) 89'	Stadium: RFK Stadium; Referee: Michael Kennedy

May 5, 2001 4	MetroStars	3–2	D.C. United	East Rutherford, New Jersey
	Perez (yellow card) 56'; Mathis 79'; Faria 88'; Villegas 90'	Report	Moreno 33' (pen.), 52'; Talley (yellow card) 38'; Ziadie (yellow card) 40'; Nelsen (yellow card) 45'; Etcheverry (yellow card) 78'	Stadium: Giants Stadium; Referee: Tim Weyland

May 9, 2001 5	D.C. United	5–0	New England Revolution	Washington, D.C.
	Conteh 5', 34', 44', 48'; Talley 40'; Nelsen (yellow card) 58'	Report	Torres (yellow card) 41'; Franchino (yellow card) 48'; Wolyniec (yellow card) 81'	Stadium: RFK Stadium; Referee: Richard Heron

May 12, 2001 6	D.C. United	2–3	San Jose Earthquakes	Washington, D.C.
	Convey (yellow card) 40'; Talley (yellow card) 44'; Denton 48'; Etcheverry (yellow card) 50'; Moreno 52' (pen.); Pope (yellow card) 90+2'	Report	Mulrooney (yellow card) 4'; Russell 36'; Lagos 54', 90+1'; Ekelund (yellow card) 71'; Isben (red card) 79'	Stadium: RFK Stadium; Referee: Noel Kenny

May 19, 2001 7	Columbus Crew	2–1 (a.e.t.)	D.C. United	Columbus, Ohio
	McBride 25'; Elcock (red card) 59'; Bonseu (red card) 67'; Cunningham 99'	Report	Etcheverry (yellow card) 39'; Talley (yellow card) 40'; Convey (yellow card) 65'; Quaranta 69', (yellow card) 90'	Stadium: Crew Stadium; Referee: Rich Grady

May 30, 2001 8	Miami Fusion	2–1	D.C. United	Fort Lauderdale, Florida
	Preki 11' (pen.); Bishop (yellow card) 12'; McKinley (yellow card) 18'; Mastroeni (yellow card) 52'; Rooney 71'	Report	Ziadie (yellow card) 29'; Denton (yellow card) 38'; Nelsen (yellow card) 39'; Albright 54'; Moreno (yellow card) 58'	Stadium: Lockhart Stadium; Referee: Ricardo Valenzuela

June 2, 2001 9	D.C. United	1–2	Chicago Fire	Washington, D.C.
	Moreno 7', (yellow card) 80'; Lisi (yellow card) 33'; Ziadie (yellow card) 37'; Pope (yellow card) 61'; Wood (yellow card) 78'; Ammann (yellow card) 90'	Report	Stoichkov (yellow card) 3'; Curtin (red card) 59'; Wynalda 76'; Kovalenko 79' (pen.), (yellow card) 80'	Stadium: RFK Stadium; Referee: Tim Weyland

June 9, 2001 10	Dallas Burn	3–0	D.C. United	Dallas, Texas
	Rodríguez (yellow card) 18'; Suarez 17'; Rhine 29'; Farrer (yellow card) 60'; Martínez 73'	Report	Watson (yellow card) 8'; Alegría (yellow card) 32'; Convey (yellow card) 64'	Stadium: Cotton Bowl; Referee: Alex Prus

June 13, 2001 11	D.C. United	2–1	MetroStars	Washington, D.C.
	Namoff (yellow card) 13'; Talley (yellow card) 52'; Ziadie (yellow card) 55'; Moreno 69'; Conteh 78'; Alegría (red card) 83'	Report	Faria 10'; Semioli (yellow card) 19'; Comas (yellow card) 45+3'; Perez (yellow card) 90+1'	Stadium: RFK Stadium; Referee: Gus St. Silva

June 16, 2001 12	Kansas City Wizards	0–3	D.C. United	Kansas City, Missouri
		Report	Watson (yellow card) 21'; Wood (yellow card) 46'; Conteh 53'; Quaranta 55', 63'	Stadium: Arrowhead Stadium; Referee: Richard Heron

June 23, 2001 13	Tampa Bay Mutiny	3–2	D.C. United	Tampa, Florida
	Ralston 8'; Diallo 23'; Anderson (yellow card) 38'; Kotschau (yellow card) 39'; Barclay 42'; Quill (yellow card) 46'; Trittschuh (yellow card) 54'; Demmin (yellow card) 73'	Report	Moreno 52'; Albright (yellow card) 82'; Armstrong 90+1'	Stadium: Raymond James Stadium; Referee: Rich Grady

June 30, 2001 14	D.C. United	1–1 (a.e.t.)	Colorado Rapids	Washington, D.C.
	Vermillion (yellow card) 45'; Conteh 58'	Report	Baba 41', (yellow card) 81'	Stadium: RFK Stadium; Referee: Gerry Corrie

July 4, 2001 15	Colorado Rapids	3–1	D.C. United	Denver, Colorado
	Spencer 1', 59', 81'; Martinez (yellow card) 18'; Dawes (yellow card) 84'	Report	Moreno 56'	Stadium: Mile High Stadium; Referee: Peter Kokolski

July 7, 2001 16	D.C. United	0–3	Los Angeles Galaxy	Washington, D.C.
	Albright (yellow card) 53'; Ziadie (yellow card) 87'	Report	Caligiuri (yellow card) 37'; Hendrickson 45+1'; Jones (yellow card) 63', (goal) 84'; Hernández 83' (pen.)	Stadium: RFK Stadium; Referee: Noel Kenny

July 14, 2001 17	New England Revolution	1–3	D.C. United	Foxborough, Massachusetts
	Asad (yellow card) 42'; Williams (yellow card) 71'; Sunsing 87'	Report	Quaranta 5', 90+4'; Talley (yellow card) 16'; Vermillion (yellow card) 45+2'; Pope (yellow card) 69'; Moreno 71'	Stadium: Foxboro Stadium; Referee: Ricardo Valenzuela

July 18, 2001 18	San Jose Earthquakes	4–0	D.C. United	San Jose, California
	Lagos 37', 53'; Cerritos 49', 56' (pen.)	Report	Albright (yellow card) 52'; Armstrong (yellow card) 73'	Stadium: Spartan Stadium; Referee: Alex Prus

July 21, 2001 19	MetroStars	2–1	D.C. United	East Rutherford, New Jersey
	Walsh 6', (yellow card) 6'; Petke (yellow card) 45+2'; Talley 86' (o.g.); Perez (yellow card) 89'	Report	Talley 58'	Stadium: Giants Stadium

August 1, 2001 20	D.C. United	2–2 (a.e.t.)	Miami Fusion	Washington, D.C.
	Conteh 30', 33'; Moreno (yellow card) 37'; Ziadie (yellow card) 90+3'	Report	Chacón 55'; Serna 74'	Stadium: RFK Stadium; Referee: Kevin Stott

August 11, 2001 21	Los Angeles Galaxy	1–0	D.C. United	Pasadena, California
	Vanney (yellow card) 28'; Vagenas (yellow card) 48'; Hendrickson 72'	Report	Talley (yellow card) 33'; Namoff (yellow card) 63'	Stadium: Rose Bowl; Referee: Michael Kennedy

August 15, 2001 22	D.C. United	1–2	MetroStars	Washington, D.C.
	Lisi 87'; Armstrong (yellow card) 90+2'	Report	Faria 10'; Williams (yellow card) 23'; Chung 41'; Semioli (yellow card) 73'	Stadium: RFK Stadium; Referee: Paul Tamberino

August 18, 2001 23	New England Revolution	2–1	D.C. United	Foxborough, Massachusetts
	Chronopoulos 9', 30'; Heaps (yellow card) 12'; Williams (yellow card) 33'	Report	Armstrong 32'; Moreno (yellow card) 34'; Pope (yellow card) 44'; Conteh (yellow card) 58'; Kamler (yellow card) 69'; Nelsen (yellow card) 86'; Talley (red card) 90+2'	Stadium: Foxboro Stadium; Referee: Terry Vaughn

August 25, 2001 24	D.C. United	2–1	Columbus Crew	Washington, D.C.
	Conteh (yellow card) 54', (goal) 80'; Etcheverry (yellow card) 58'; Armstrong 69'; Pope (yellow card) 76'	Report	Clark (yellow card) 14'; Cunningham 25', (yellow card) 41'; Oughton (yellow card) 52'	Stadium: RFK Stadium; Referee: Kevin Stott

September 1, 2001 25	D.C. United	5–1	Tampa Bay Mutiny	Washington, D.C.
	Conteh 27', 49'; Namoff (yellow card) 34'; Moreno 39'; Lisi 47'; Alegría 71'	Report	Demmin (yellow card) 15'; Keller (yellow card) 35'; Jair 61'; Soñora (yellow card) 64'	Stadium: RFK Stadium; Referee: Rich Grady

September 8, 2001 26	Miami Fusion	3–1	D.C. United	Fort Lauderdale, Florida
	Chacón 3', 26', 70'; Rooney (yellow card) 45'; Bishop (yellow card) 49'	Report	Albright (yellow card) 58'; Etcheverry (yellow card) 59'; Armstrong (yellow card) 62'; Lisi 64'; Talley (yellow card) 78'	Stadium: Lockhart Stadium

September 12, 2001 27	D.C. United	v	Dallas Burn	Washington, D.C.
				Stadium: RFK Stadium
Note: Match cancelled due to the September 11 attacks.

September 15, 2001 28	D.C. United	v	Miami Fusion	Washington, D.C.
				Stadium: RFK Stadium
Note: Match cancelled due to the September 11 attacks.

=== U.S. Open Cup ===
June 27, 2001 Second round	D.C. United (Washington, D.C.)	8–0	New Jersey Stallions	Germantown, Maryland
19:30 UTC−5	Albright 20'; Thompson Conteh 28', 39', 49'; Pope 38'; Etcheverry 45'; Hennessy 56' (o.g.); Algeria 74'			Stadium: Maryland SoccerPlex; Attendance: 3,200; Referee: Thomas Perry

July 11, 2001 Third round	D.C. United (Washington, D.C.)	3–0	(Pennsylvania) Hershey Wildcats	Richmond, Virginia
19:30 UTC−5	Albright 35'; Moreno 70'; Quaranta 74'	Report		Stadium: City Stadium; Attendance: 5,288; Referee: (Maryland) Paul Tamberino

July 24, 2001 Quarterfinals	D.C. United (Washington, D.C.)	2–1	(Virginia) Richmond Kickers	Washington, D.C.
19:30 UTC−5	Conteh 59', 86'	Report	Jeffrey 88'	Stadium: RFK Stadium; Attendance: 8,439; Referee: (New Jersey) Terry Vaughn

July 24, 2001 Semifinals	New England Revolution (Massachusetts)	2–0	(Washington, D.C.) D.C. United	Foxborough, Massachusetts
19:30 UTC−5	Williams 9', 40'	Report		Stadium: Foxboro Stadium; Attendance: 7,128; Referee: (California) Brian Hall

=== CONCACAF Giants Cup ===
April 4, 2001 Quarterfinals	Arnett Gardens (Jamaica)	0–3	(United States) D.C. United	Kingston, Jamaica
19:30 UTC−5		Report	Díaz Arce 33' 66' (pen.); Talley 59'	Stadium: Tony Spaulding Sports Complex

April 11, 2001 Quarterfinals	D.C. United (United States)	2–1 (5–1 agg.)	(Jamaica) Arnett Gardens	Washington, D.C., United States
15:00 UTC−5	Talley 30' (pen.); Lisi 86'	Report	Earle 23'	Stadium: RFK Stadium

August 3, 2001 Semifinals	D.C. United (United States)	2–1	(Guatemala) Comunicaciones	Los Angeles, United States
22:00 UTC−5	Moreno 26'; Lisi 89'		Rivera 22'	Stadium: Rose Bowl

August 5, 2001 Final	América (Mexico)	2–0	(United States) D.C. United	Los Angeles, United States
22:00 UTC−5	Mendoza 52'; Váldez 70'			Stadium: Rose Bowl; Attendance: 3,000

=== Friendlies ===
May 23, 2001	D.C. United	3–4	Bayer Leverkusen	Washington, D.C.
12:00 UTC−5				Stadium: RFK Stadium

November 17, 2001	D.C. United	2–2	Olimpia	Washington, D.C.
12:00 UTC−5				Stadium: RFK Stadium

== See also ==
- D.C. United
- List of D.C. United seasons
