= Atlantic Cup (Major League Soccer) =

Association football trophy

- Other names: I-95 Derby’s
- Location: Mid-Atlantic
- Teams: D.C. United; New York Red Bulls
- First meeting: May 12, 1996; MLS regular season DC 1–2 NY/NJ MetroStars
- Latest meeting: October 14, 2026; MLS regular season DC 2–1 RBNY
- Next meeting: TBD

Statistics
- Total meetings: 112
- Most wins: D.C. United (48)
- All-time series: DC 48–21–43 NY Red Bulls
- Regular season series: MLS: DC 38–19–36 NY Red Bulls; Open Cup: DC 2–0–3 NY Red Bulls
- Postseason results: DC 8–2–4 NY Red Bulls
- Largest victory: NY/NJ MetroStars 0–5 DC; Major League Soccer (September 16, 1998)

The Atlantic Cup is both the name of the rivalry, as well as the trophy awarded to the winner of the regular season series between D.C. United and the New York Red Bulls. The series occurs twice a year, with each team hosting one match. Although the Atlantic Cup is just one of the now many "I-95 derbies" it is still considered by many Major League Soccer (MLS) fans and pundits to be the original derby of the East Coast.

Inaugurated in 2002, the Atlantic Cup is a historic rivalry in MLS. The origins of the rivalry are unknown, but some claim that it developed due to the cities' relative proximity to each other, and the frequency with which the two clubs play one another in league, playoff, and Open Cup play. New York City and Washington, D.C. have other sporting rivalries, such as in American football (Commanders–Giants rivalry) and ice hockey (Capitals–Rangers rivalry). For United, the Red Bulls are the only opponent they have competed against in more than six occasions in both the U.S. Open Cup and the MLS Cup playoffs.

Initially, the rivalry has been in favor of D.C. United, in terms of silverware collected and matches won. Over both clubs' histories, United has won a dozen major titles, while New York was the last original MLS franchise to win its first major title (in 2013). However, while the Atlantic Cup was dominated by D.C. United during a majority of the 1990s and 2000s, New York dominated the series during a majority of the 2010s and 2020s.

As of October 14, 2026, the two sides have met 112 times across all competitions, 94 of them were in the MLS regular season, 13 in MLS Cup playoffs, and 5 in U.S. Open Cup. D.C. United are the current titleholders of the Atlantic Cup.

== The rivalry ==
=== Origins ===
The two teams first met on May 12, 1996; when the New York Red Bulls were branded as the New York/New Jersey MetroStars. The game was played at RFK Stadium in front of a crowd of 14,722, and ended 1–1 in regulation time. In regulation time, United's John Harkes scored United's first ever goal against the MetroStars off an assist from Tony Sanneh in the 11th minute. The MetroStars' Giovanni Savarese drew the match level in the 62nd minute. At the time, if Major League Soccer ended drawn at the end of regulation time, it entered the 35-yard shootout. In the shootout, the MetroStars won the first match of the series 2–1.

During the inaugural regular season, the two sides would meet each other three more times, with the two sides sharing spoils. The 1996 season ended gridlocked with each club winning two matches apiece, winning one match in their home stadium, and another on the road. However, on aggregate goals, United outscored the MetroStars 6–4. The two sides met again in the Conference Semifinals 1996 MLS Cup Playoffs, where United defeated the MetroStars 2–1 in a best-of-three series. The first game of the post-season series, played on September 24, 1996, ended in the MetroStars' favor, as NY/NJ posted a victory in the shootout following a 2–2 tie after regulation. Three days later, United earned a 1–0 regulation victory at home, tying the series at 1–1, before culminating the series with a 2–1 victory, thanks to an 89th-minute penalty kick from Raul Diaz Arce. In the 1996 MLS Cup Playoffs, United would eventually go on to win the inaugural MLS Cup, defeating the Los Angeles Galaxy, 3–2.

By next year, the two franchises took opposite routes in MLS' sophomore campaign, with D.C. United eventually going on to win their second MLS Cup championship, while the NY/NJ MetroStars failed to qualify for the 1997 MLS Cup Playoffs altogether. Despite the poorer form from the MetroStars, the club won the regular season series against United, through the virtue of more aggregate goals. The two sides faced off four times during the season, with United winning the first two outings, while the MetroStars won the final two meetings. In the final regular season matchup, held on September 27, 1997; United lost at home by a 3–1 scoreline against the MetroStars, ultimately failing to win the series.

=== Arrival of the formal cup ===
At the start of the 2002 Major League Soccer season, a formal trophy was incarnated by the administrators of D.C. United and the MetroStars, which was titled the "Atlantic Cup". In the 2002 series, United earned the trophy, winning two of the three regular season outings against the MetroStars. Despite the success, neither team qualified for the 2002 MLS Cup Playoffs, being the only two teams in the league not to qualify that season.

During the 2003 Lamar Hunt U.S. Open Cup, the MetroStars and United both enjoyed successful Open Cup campaigns, meeting each other in the semifinal round of the Open Cup, marking the first time the two rivals met in the domestic tournament. In the quarterfinals, the MetroStars enjoyed a golden goal victory from an Amado Guevara goal in the 116th minute, defeating fellow MLS side, the New England Revolution, in the process. United faced USISL Pro League side (third division), Wilmington Hammerheads. The match, played in Wilmington, North Carolina, saw United emerge victorious 1–0 off a Ronald Cerritos goal in the 30th minute.

The October 1, 2003 Open Cup semifinal affair was hosted by the MetroStars and played on at Yurcak Field in Piscataway, New Jersey, marking the first time in Atlantic Cup history the two sides met at Yurcak. In the outing, United got the go-ahead goal in the 18th minute of play off a strike from Galin Ivanov. Honduran international, Amado Guevara, netted two unanswered goals for the MetroStars in the 20th and 43rd minutes of play, giving the MetroStars a 2–1 lead going into the break. With less than 15 minutes remaining in regulation, United's Cerritos netted the equalizer, only before longtime MetroStars striker, John Wolyniec netted the match-winner, sending the MetroStars to their first ever championship of a major tournament.

=== Early club connections ===
In addition, early in the history of the league, there were personality clashes between members of the two teams. For example, MetroStars players Tony Meola and Tab Ramos were long time acquaintances of D.C. United's captain John Harkes. All three players were natives of New Jersey and had played together and against each other most of their lives. DC fans especially singled out Meola (who was briefly an actor and who had tried out to be the placekicker for the New York Jets) for scorn. In response, MetroStars supporters tended to reserve most of their scorn for Richie Williams. Ironically, former D.C. assistant coach Bob Bradley would coach the MetroStars, and the Red Bulls coaching staff was also headed by former D.C. coach Bruce Arena until the end of the 2007 season, assisted by Harkes and Williams.

=== Red Bull controversy ===
The rivalry became even greater when the two met at Giants Stadium on April 22, 2006 as Alecko Eskandarian scored the first goal of a 4–1 D.C. United victory. After the goal he took a sip of Red Bull energy drink and then spit it on the ground as an intentional slight on the recently renamed New York Red Bulls. MLS fined Eskandarian $250 for his actions.

=== Recent years ===
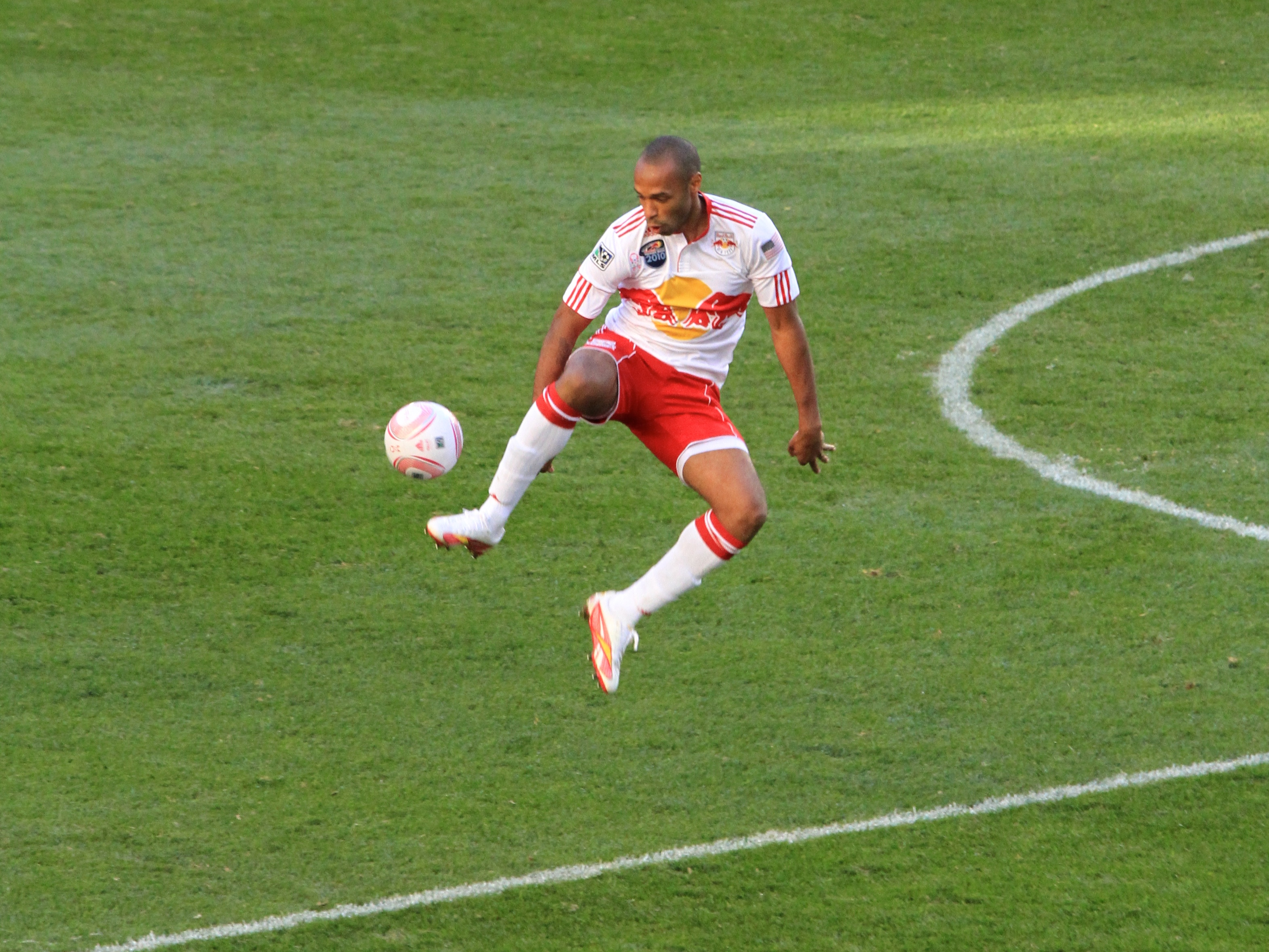
Thierry Henry was one of several high-profile acquisitions by New York in 2010.

Throughout the 2010 season, D.C. United hit an all-time nadir record wise, whereas the New York Red Bulls were making several high-profile acquisitions, causing some to believe that New York was becoming the more dominant Atlantic Cup team. On May 1, 2010; while United had lost their first four regular season matches, New York had won their first four matches. Attaining opposite records of 4–0–0 and 0–0–4, respectively, New York earned a 2–0 road win at RFK Stadium. The win was New York's first road win against D.C. since October 8, 2005 and their first win against United since 2008, as well as their first shutout against United since 2006. Subsequently, United drew 0–0 against New York in their first meeting in Red Bull Arena allowing the Red Bulls to win the Atlantic Cup derby for the first time since 2003, ending a six-year stretch of titles won by D.C.

The rivalry intensified, mainly between United and Red Bulls supporters in April 2011, when New York visited D.C. At the time, New York had been on a two-game winning streak, and held by far the best Eastern Conference record. United, rebuilding from the prior year were much lower in the standings. Goals from Thierry Henry, Joel Lindpere and Juan Agudelo lead the Red Bulls to a commanding 4–0 victory over United, making it the worst loss United suffered at home since the 2005 MLS Cup Playoffs, and their worst loss ever to New York. However, in the return match, United earned a 1–0 away victory at Red Bull Arena, giving them some consolation over New York, but ultimately failing to win the Atlantic Cup for the second straight year. In spite of winning the Atlantic Cup for two-straight years, making it New York's first time since 2003, players expressed disinterest in the honor.

On June 24, 2012, the two sides clashed again in the second of three legs of the series. The match ended in New York's advantage, earning a 3–2 victory over D.C. Ex-United midfielder Brandon Barklage netted two of the Red Bulls' three goals. United's Chris Pontius scored the fastest goal in franchise history, scoring 29 seconds after kickoff. The announced crowd of 25,187 was the largest in Red Bull Arena history, and the largest crowd to witness the rivalry since 2004.

On January 18, 2022, the LA Galaxy announced that the Red Bulls and D.C. United will participate in the Coachella Valley Invitational.

On April 21, 2022, the teams were drawn together for the Round of 32 in the U.S. Open Cup. The Red Bulls defeated D.C. United 3-0 on May 10, 2022 to advance to the Round of 16, with a first half goal in stoppage time by Luquinhas, and second half goals by John Tolkin and Zach Ryan. After adding up a few more wins, the Red Bulls would eventually fall to Orlando City SC in the Semifinals.

Despite D.C. United taking advantage of the Red Bulls in the 2000s, New York has seized control of the rivalry in the late 2010s, as well as the early 2020s. The Bulls took the past seven of eight season series, passing D.C. United for the Atlantic Cup lead at 16–14 heading into 2026.

== Supporters ==
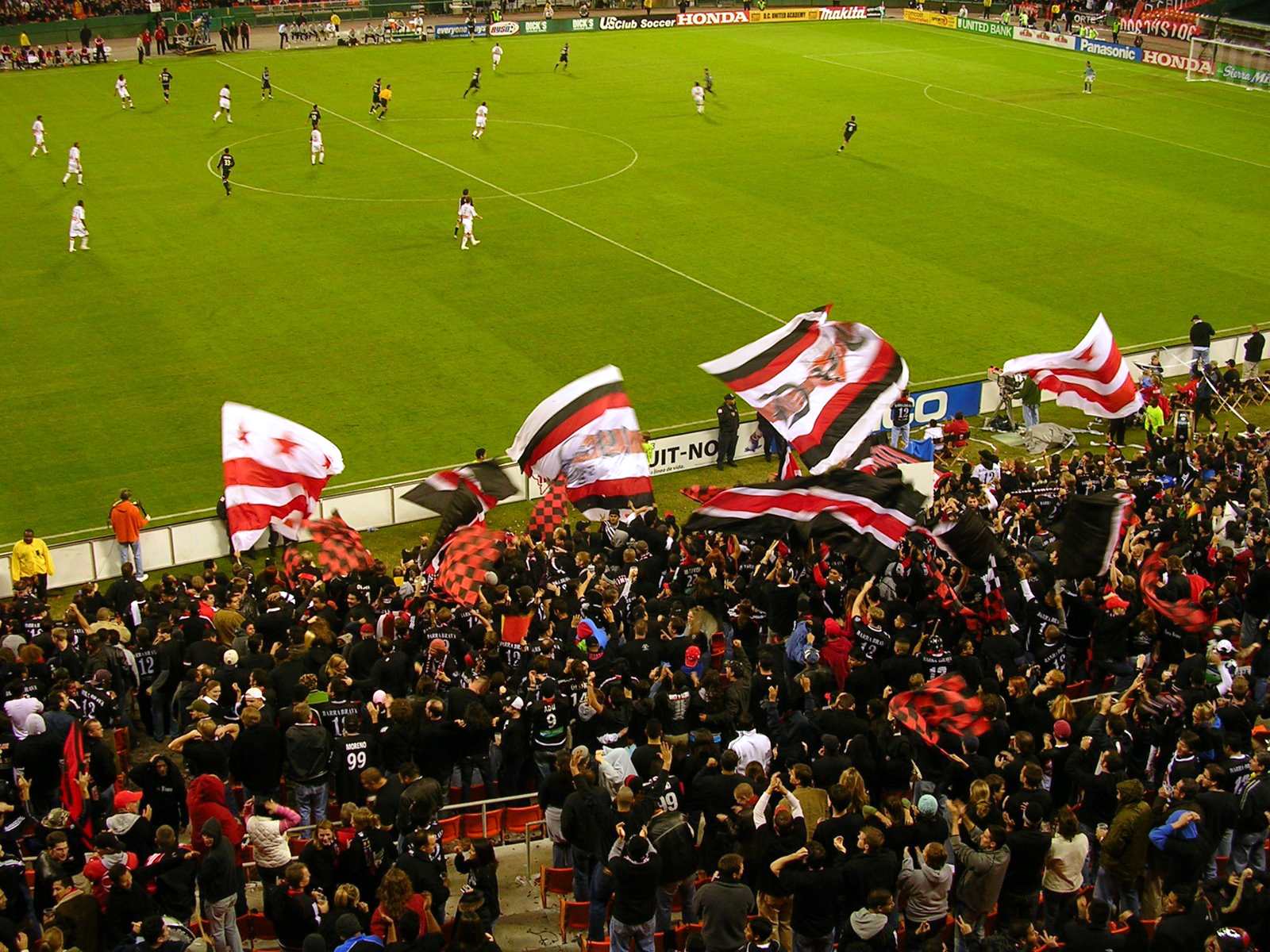
La Barra Brava and Screaming Eagles supporters groups at RFK Stadium.

A majority of the Atlantic Cup derby is seen between the supporters groups of D.C. United and the New York Red Bulls. Two of the largest and oldest supporters clubs in Major League Soccer history, originate as supporters of United and Red Bull. The largest supporters groups of D.C. United, La Barra Brava, and the Screaming Eagles, formed in 1995, a year before the inaugural season of the league. Likewise, the first supporters group for New York, the Empire Supporters Club also formed in 1995, making the three fan clubs amongst the oldest in modern-day American soccer, the first version of super-fans seen in American soccer since the late 1970s/early 1980s during the North American Soccer League era.

Over the years, several other supporters groups have sprouted to support D.C. United and the New York Red Bulls. Since 1996, La Norte and the District Ultras formed in support of D.C. United. Likewise the Garden State Ultras, a group of Red Bull fans based in New Jersey, and the Viking Army, named in tribute to former Red Bull coach, Hans Backe and his Scandinavian roots, have formed. La Norte is known for bringing a heavy Latin-American feel to RFK Stadium and its atmosphere, launching toilet paper, banners, and playing various instruments much like club teams in South America. The District Ultras are an ultras fan group that is known for its controversial stances in opposition to the league structure of MLS, and the way the league operates under its single entity structure. Throughout the first few years of existence, the Ultras have been known for very political signs denouncing the franchise set up existing in MLS and promoting a more independent club setup, commonly seen throughout the rest of the world and in the lower divisions of the American soccer pyramid.

Because of the proximities of the New York City and Washington, D.C. metropolitan areas (about 228 miles, or 367 kilometers) matches between the two clubs have high levels of away supporters, average in the thousands for matches.

== Players and transfers ==
=== D.C., then New York ===
Name	Pos	D.C.			New York		
Name	Pos	Career	Apps	Goals	Career	Apps	Goals
(United States) Jeff Agoos	DF	1999–2000	158	7	2005	28	0
(United States) Chris Albright	DF	1996–2001	56	4	2010–2011	26	0
(United States) Brandon Barklage	DF	2009–2011	11	0	2012–2013	51	2
(United States) Bobby Convey	MF	2000–2004	89	8	2014	14	0
(United States) Brian Kamler	DF	1996–1999, 2001	72	3	2002	8	1
(Ukraine) Dema Kovalenko	MF	2003–2005	82	12	2006–2007	36	2
(United States) Mark Lisi	MF	2001–2002	31	4	2002–2006	89	3
(Brazil) Thiago Martins	FW	2003	5	0	2006	1	0
(United States) Dax McCarty	MF	2011	13	0	2011–2016	198	15
(Bolivia) Jaime Moreno	FW	1998–2002, 2004–2010	150	69	2003	12	2
(United States) Santino Quaranta	MF	2001–2006, 2008–2011	159	25	2007	3	0
(United States) Eddie Pope	DF	1996–2002	143	8	2003–2004	51	2
(United States) Carey Talley	DF	1998–2001, 2010	124	10	2010	1	0
(United States) Richie Williams	MF	1996–2000, 2002	169	8	2001, 2003	47	0
(Jamaica) Craig Ziadie	DF	2001–2002	19	0	2002–2004	57	1

=== New York, then D.C. ===
Name	Pos	New York			D.C.		
Name	Pos	Career	Apps	Goals	Career	Apps	Goals
(United States) Mike Ammann	GK	1999–2000	46	0	2001	19	0
(United States) Austin da Luz	MF	2011	7	1	2011	14	0
(Canada) Dwayne De Rosario	MF	2011	13	2	2011–2013	68	23
(Liberia) Francis Doe	FW	2007	8	2	2008–2009	14	2
(Argentina) Fabián Espíndola	FW	2013	28	9	2014–2016	59	20
(Saint Vincent and the Grenadines) Ezra Hendrickson	DF	1997	8	0	2004	12	0
(France) Sébastien Le Toux	FW	2012	14	1	2017	16	2
(Brazil) Felipe Martins	MF	2015–2017	100	10	2019–2021	44	1
(United States) Jeff Parke	DF	2004–2008	143	1	2014	13	0
(United States) Mike Petke	DF	1998–2002, 2009–2010	197	7	2003–2005	58	5
(United States) Orlando Perez	DF	2000–2002	41	0	2002	8	0
(Ghana) Lloyd Sam	MF	2012–2016	106	20	2016–2017	43	5
(Argentina) Diego Soñora	DF	1998	30	3	1999	27	1
(United States) Joe Vide	MF	2006–2008	23	0	2009	8	1
(Ecuador) Petter Villegas	MF	1996, 1999–2002	91	13	2002	18	2
(United States) Zach Wells	GK	2004–2005	19	0	2008	17	0
(United States) A. J. Wood	FW	1996–1997	36	7	1998–2001	74	1
(Colombia) Henry Zambrano	FW	1999	14	3	2002	5	1

== Honors ==
With 13 major honors, D.C. United have won more major competitions than any other Major League Soccer club, and are tied for the most of any North American soccer franchise ever. D.C. United won their first major title in 1996, winning the 1996 MLS Cup championship. Since then, they have claimed three additional MLS Cups (league championship), four Supporters' Shields (league premiership), three U.S. Open Cups (national championship) and one CONCACAF Champions Cup title (continental championship). In addition, United won the 1998 Copa Interamericana, an infrequently-held and now-defunct super cup between the champions of CONCACAF and CONMEBOL. Of the original MLS franchises, New York was the last to have won its first major honor, capturing their first Supporters' Shield in 2013.

Table correct as of October 28, 2018

Team	MLS Cup	Supporters' Shield	U.S. Open Cup	CONCACAF Champions League	Copa Interamericana	Total
D.C. United	4	4	3	1	1	13
New York Red Bulls	0	3	0	0	0	3
Combined	4	7	3	1	1	16

== All-time game results ==
The largest victory in the history between these sides was a 5–0 victory by D.C. United over the New York MetroStars at Giants Stadium. The match was played on September 16, 1998. The match remains United's largest away victory against New York in history. New York's largest victory came on April 21, 2011 when the Red Bulls posted a 4–0 victory over United. The largest crowd on hand to witness the Atlantic Cup was on April 17, 2004 when 72,312 witnessed New York post a 3–2 victory over D.C. United.

New York wins United wins Draw

No.	Date	Competition	Venue	Home team	Score	Away team	Goalscorers	Attendance
1.	May 12, 1996	MLS	RFK Stadium	D.C. United	1–1*	Metrostars	(H) Harkes (A) Savarese	14,722
2.	May 30, 1996	MLS	Giants Stadium	Metrostars	1–2	D.C. United	(H) Wood (A) Rammel, Sanneh	25,322
3.	August 21, 1996	MLS	Giants Stadium	Metrostars	2–3	D.C. United	(H) de Ávila (2) (A) Williams, Etcheverry, Díaz Arce	20,416
4.	September 6, 1996	MLS	RFK Stadium	D.C. United	1–2	Metrostars	(H) Sanneh (A) de Ávila, Joseph	8,053
5.	September 24, 1996	MLS Playoffs	Giants Stadium	Metrostars	2–2*	D.C. United	(H) de Ávila, Savarese (A) Díaz Arce, Moreno	14,416
6.	September 27, 1996	MLS Playoffs	RFK Stadium	D.C. United	1–0	Metrostars	(H) Etcheverry (A)	21,442
7.	October 2, 1996	MLS Playoffs	RFK Stadium	D.C. United	2–1	Metrostars	(H) Rammel, Díaz Arce (A) de Ávila	20,423
8.	April 5, 1997	MLS	RFK Stadium	D.C. United	2–1	Metrostars	(H) Pope, Moreno (A) de Ávila	28,749
9.	April 19, 1997	MLS	Giants Stadium	Metrostars	1–2	D.C. United	(H) Savarese (A) Díaz Arce, Moreno	26,322
10.	July 27, 1997	MLS	Giants Stadium	Metrostars	2–1	D.C. United	(H) Savarese, de Ávila (A) Harkes	20,104
11.	September 28, 1997	MLS	RFK Stadium	D.C. United	1–3	Metrostars	(H) Moreno (A) Kelly, Savarese, Joseph	9,686
12.	May 9, 1998	MLS	RFK Stadium	D.C. United	2–0	Metrostars	(H) Etcheverry, Lassiter (A)	17,027
13.	May 16, 1998	MLS	Giants Stadium	Metrostars	4–3	D.C. United	(H) Savarese (2), Rooney, Hurtado (A) Sanneh, Lassiter, Moreno	15,322
14.	August 22, 1998	MLS	RFK Stadium	D.C. United	2–1	Metrostars	(H) Moreno, Etcheverry (A) Soñora	16,729
15.	September 16, 1998	MLS	Giants Stadium	Metrostars	0–5	D.C. United	(H) Lassiter, Moreno, Olsen, Harty (own goal), Wood (A)	14,117
16.	April 3, 1999	MLS	Giants Stadium	Metrostars	0–1	D.C. United	(H) (A) Lassiter	20,978
17.	May 8, 1999	MLS	RFK Stadium	D.C. United	2–1	Metrostars	(H) Lassiter, Moreno (A) Kalonji	15,499
18.	August 11, 1999	MLS	Giants Stadium	Metrostars	1–4	D.C. United	(H) Ćurčić (A) Talley, Moreno, Olsen, Wood	6,876
19.	September 18, 1999	MLS	RFK Stadium	D.C. United	1–1*	Metrostars	(H) Moreno (A) Villegas	21,463
20.	April 1, 2000	MLS	Giants Stadium	Metrostars	3–2	D.C. United	(H) Comas, Kelly, Valencia (A) Moreno, Agoos	27,322
21.	April 22, 2000	MLS	RFK Stadium	D.C. United	2–3	Metrostars	(H) Perez (own goal), Etcheverry (A) Agoos (own goal), Villegas, Petke	14,985
22.	June 21, 2000	MLS	Giants Stadium	Metrostars	2–2	D.C. United	(H) Mathis, Ramos (A) Albright, Moreno	10,316
23.	August 2, 2000	MLS	RFK Stadium	D.C. United	3–2	Metrostars	(H) Díaz Arce, Moreno, Wood (A) Valencia, Walsh	13,801
24.	May 5, 2001	MLS	Giants Stadium	Metrostars	2–1	D.C. United	(H) Mathis, Faria, Villegas (A) Moreno (2)	20,877
25.	June 13, 2001	MLS	RFK Stadium	D.C. United	2–1	Metrostars	(H) Conteh, Moreno (A) Faria	11,581
26.	July 21, 2001	MLS	Giants Stadium	Metrostars	2–1	D.C. United	(H) Walsh, Talley (own goal) (A) Talley	32,723
27.	August 15, 2001	MLS	RFK Stadium	D.C. United	1–2	Metrostars	(H) Lisi (A) Faria, Chung	11,618
28.	May 18, 2002	MLS	RFK Stadium	D.C. United	4–2	Metrostars	(H) Moreno (2), Villegas, Etcheverry (A) Faria, Lisi	20,105
29.	August 25, 2002	MLS	Giants Stadium	Metrostars	1–0	D.C. United	(H) Mathis (A)	20,447
30.	September 12, 2002	MLS	Giants Stadium	Metrostars	0–1	D.C. United	(H) (A) Etcheverry	14,585
31.	September 14, 2002	MLS	RFK Stadium	D.C. United	2–1	Metrostars	(H) Convey, Curtis (A) Faria	17,677
32.	May 10, 2003	MLS	Giants Stadium	Metrostars	1–0	D.C. United	(H) Mathis (A)	17,934
33.	July 5, 2003	MLS	RFK Stadium	D.C. United	2–3	Metrostars	(H) Etcheverry, Kovalenko (A) Moreno, Clark, Gaven	13,715
34.	September 25, 2003	MLS	Giants Stadium	Metrostars	0–2	D.C. United	(H) (A) Olsen, Cerritos	8,077
35.	September 28, 2003	MLS	RFK Stadium	D.C. United	1–1	Metrostars	(H) Etcheverry (A) Magee	13,521
36.	October 1, 2003	Open Cup	Yurcak Field	Metrostars	3–2	D.C. United	(H) Guevara (2), Wolyniec (A) Ivanov, Cerritos	3,791
37.	April 17, 2004	MLS	Giants Stadium	Metrostars	3–2	D.C. United	(H) Taylor (2), Wolyniec (A) Olsen, Adu	31,419
38.	July 3, 2004	MLS	RFK Stadium	D.C. United	6–2	Metrostars	(H) Nelsen, Moreno, Eskandarian (2), Stewart, Olsen (A) Gaven, Taylor	16,177
39.	October 2, 2004	MLS	Giants Stadium	Metrostars	0–1	D.C. United	(H) (A) Adu	32,864
40.	October 17, 2004	MLS	RFK Stadium	D.C. United	3–2	Metrostars	(H) Gómez (2), Petke (A) Wolyniec, Clark	19,832
41.	October 23, 2004	MLS Playoffs	Giants Stadium	Metrostars	0–2	D.C. United	(H) (A) Stewart, Eskandarian	11,161
42.	October 30, 2004	MLS Playoffs	RFK Stadium	D.C. United	2–0	Metrostars	(H) Moreno, Namoff (A)	15,763
43.	June 12, 2005	MLS	Giants Stadium	Metrostars	0–0	D.C. United	(H) (A)	15,125
44.	August 10, 2005	MLS	RFK Stadium	D.C. United	3–0	Metrostars	(H) Boswell, Kovalenko, Gros (A)	11,883
45.	October 1, 2005	MLS	Giants Stadium	Metrostars	1–4	D.C. United	(H) Magee (A) Agoos (own goal), Olsen (2), Moreno	27,670
46.	October 8, 2005	MLS	RFK Stadium	D.C. United	1–2	Metrostars	(H) Moreno (A) Galván Rey, Djorkaeff	18,751
47.	April 2, 2006	MLS	RFK Stadium	D.C. United	2–2	New York Red Bulls	(H) Eskandarian, Erpen (A) Djorkaeff, Buddle	23,028
48.	April 22, 2006	MLS	Giants Stadium	New York Red Bulls	1–4	D.C. United	(H) Djorkaeff (A) Eskandarian (2), Erpen, Walker	8,475
49.	August 12, 2006	MLS	Giants Stadium	New York Red Bulls	0–0	D.C. United	(H) (A)	11,230
50.	August 23, 2006	Open Cup	RFK Stadium	D.C. United	3–1	New York Red Bulls	(H) Gros, Walker (A) Guevara	8,637
51.	September 23, 2006	MLS	RFK Stadium	D.C. United	4–3	New York Red Bulls	(H) Mendes (own goal), Gómez, Moreno, Donnet (A) Guevara (2), Altidore	21,727
52.	October 21, 2006	MLS Playoffs	Giants Stadium	New York Red Bulls	0–1	D.C. United	(H) (A) Gómez	8,630
53.	October 29, 2006	MLS Playoffs	RFK Stadium	D.C. United	1–1	New York Red Bulls	(H) Gómez (A) Altidore	21,455
54.	June 10, 2007	MLS	RFK Stadium	D.C. United	4–2	New York Red Bulls	(H) Olsen (3), Emílio (A) Kovalenko Ángel	18,066
55.	July 22, 2007	MLS	Giants Stadium	New York Red Bulls	1–0	D.C. United	(H) Wolyniec (A)	14,705
56.	August 22, 2007	MLS	RFK Stadium	D.C. United	3–1	New York Red Bulls	(H) Olsen, Gómez, Moreno (A) Ángel	18,748
57.	June 14, 2008	MLS	RFK Stadium	D.C. United	4–1	New York Red Bulls	(H) Emílio (3) Simms (A) van den Bergh	18,622
58.	August 10, 2008	MLS	Giants Stadium	New York Red Bulls	4–1	D.C. United	(H) Ángel (2), Magee, Ubiparipović (A) Moreno	15,038
59.	August 30, 2008	MLS	RFK Stadium	D.C. United	0–0	New York Red Bulls	(H) (A)	15,616
60.	April 26, 2009	MLS Playoffs	Giants Stadium	New York Red Bulls	2–3	D.C. United	(H) Ángel, Richards (A) Wallace, Emílio, Pontius	10,303
61.	May 20, 2009	Open Cup	RFK Stadium	D.C. United	5–3	New York Red Bulls	(H) Pontius (2), Khumalo, Barklage, Fred (A) Richards, Rojas (2)	5,056
62.	June 4, 2009	MLS	RFK Stadium	D.C. United	2–0	New York Red Bulls	(H) Quaranta, Moreno (A)	11,226
63.	May 1, 2010	MLS	RFK Stadium	D.C. United	0–2	New York Red Bulls	(H) (A) Ibrahim, Ángel	12,089
64.	July 10, 2010	MLS	Red Bull Arena	New York Red Bulls	0–0	D.C. United	(H) (A)	16,239
65.	April 21, 2011	MLS	RFK Stadium	D.C. United	0–4	New York Red Bulls	(H) (A) Henry (2), Lindpere, Agudelo	18,052
66.	July 9, 2011	MLS	Red Bull Arena	New York Red Bulls	0–1	D.C. United	(H) (A) De Rosario	22,200
67.	April 22, 2012	MLS	RFK Stadium	D.C. United	4–1	New York Red Bulls	(H) Pontius (3), DeLeon (A) Henry	13,262
68.	June 24, 2012	MLS	Red Bull Arena	New York Red Bulls	3–2	D.C. United	(H) Barklage (2), Solli (A) Pontius (2)	25,187
69.	August 29, 2012	MLS	RFK Stadium	D.C. United	2–2	New York Red Bulls	(H) DeLeon, De Rosario (A) Lindpere, Conde	10,303
70.	November 3, 2012	MLS Playoffs	RFK Stadium	D.C. United	1–1	New York Red Bulls	(H) Miller (own goal) (A) Hamid (own goal)	17,556
71.	November 8, 2012	MLS Playoffs	Red Bull Arena	New York Red Bulls	0–1	D.C. United	(H) (A) DeLeon	14,035
72.	March 16, 2013	MLS	Red Bull Arena	New York Red Bulls	0–0	D.C. United	(H) (A)	22,022
73.	April 13, 2013	MLS	RFK Stadium	D.C. United	0–2	New York Red Bulls	(H) (A) Henry, Olave	18,019
74.	August 31, 2013	MLS	Red Bull Arena	New York Red Bulls	2–1	D.C. United	(H) Sam, Cahill (A) DeLeon	17,372
75.	April 12, 2014	MLS	RFK Stadium	D.C. United	1–0	New York Red Bulls	(H) Arnaud (A)	12,364
76.	August 31, 2014	MLS	RFK Stadium	D.C. United	2–0	New York Red Bulls	(H) Silva, Johnson (A)	19,453
77.	September 10, 2014	MLS	Red Bull Arena	New York Red Bulls	1–0	D.C. United	(H) Sam (A)	14,953
78.	November 2, 2014	MLS Playoffs	Red Bull Arena	New York Red Bulls	2–0	D.C. United	(H) Wright-Phillips, Luyindula (A)	18,054
79.	November 8, 2014	MLS Playoffs	RFK Stadium	D.C. United	2–1	New York Red Bulls	(H) DeLeon, Franklin (A) Luyindula	20,187
80.	March 22, 2015	MLS	Red Bull Arena	New York Red Bulls	2–0	D.C. United	(H) Wright-Phillips, Sam (A)	21,036
81.	April 11, 2015	MLS	RFK Stadium	D.C. United	2–2	New York Red Bulls	(H) Kitchen (2) (A) Perrinelle, Sam	16,304
82.	August 30, 2015	MLS	Red Bull Arena	New York Red Bulls	3–0	D.C. United	(H) Wright-Phillips (2), Sam (A)	22,645
83.	November 1, 2015	MLS Playoffs	RFK Stadium	D.C. United	0–1	New York Red Bulls	(H) (A) McCarty	19,525
84.	November 8, 2015	MLS Playoffs	Red Bull Arena	New York Red Bulls	1–0	D.C. United	(H) Wright-Phillips (A)	25,219
85.	May 13, 2016	MLS	RFK Stadium	D.C. United	2–0	New York Red Bulls	(H) Saborio, Nyarko (A)	19,632
86.	August 21, 2016	MLS	RFK Stadium	D.C. United	2–2	New York Red Bulls	(H) Sarvas, Mullins (A) Wright-Phillips, Felipe	15,139
87.	September 11, 2016	MLS	Red Bull Arena	New York Red Bulls	2–2	D.C. United	(H) Verón, Wright-Phillips (A) Birnbaum, Neagle	20,086
88.	April 15, 2017	MLS	Red Bull Arena	New York Red Bulls	2–0	D.C. United	(H) Muyl, Wright-Phillips (A)	20,104
89.	September 27, 2017	MLS	Red Bull Arena	New York Red Bulls	3–3	D.C. United	(H) Adams (2), Verón (A) Stieber, Mullins, Escobar (own goal)	16,538
90.	October 22, 2017	MLS	RFK Stadium	D.C. United	1–2	New York Red Bulls	(H) Arriola (A) Murillo, Verón	41,418
91.	July 25, 2018	MLS	Audi Field	D.C. United	0–1	New York Red Bulls	(H) (A) Wright-Phillips	15,655
92.	August 26, 2018	MLS	Red Bull Arena	New York Red Bulls	1–0	D.C. United	(H) Kaku (A)	22,324
93.	September 16, 2018	MLS	Audi Field	D.C. United	3–3	New York Red Bulls	(H) Arriola, Rooney, Acosta (A) Wright-Phillips (3)	18,331
94.	August 21, 2019	MLS	Audi Field	D.C. United	1–2	New York Red Bulls	(H) Kamara (A) Kaku, Royer	18,302
95.	September 29, 2019	MLS	Red Bull Arena	New York Red Bulls	0–0	D.C. United	(H) (A)	20,118
96.	September 2, 2020	MLS	Red Bull Arena	New York Red Bulls	0–1	D.C. United	(H) (A) Sorga	0 (Note: Held behind closed doors due to the COVID-19 restrictions.)
97.	September 12, 2020	MLS	Audi Field	D.C. United	0–2	New York Red Bulls	(H) (A) Long, Royer	0
98.	July 25, 2021	MLS	Audi Field	D.C. United	1–0	New York Red Bulls	(H) Kamara (A)	15,912
99.	September 11, 2021	MLS	Red Bull Arena	New York Red Bulls	1–1	D.C. United	(H) Yearwood (A) Kamara	12,574
100.	October 27, 2021	MLS	Audi Field	D.C. United	1–0	New York Red Bulls	(H) Paredes (A)	14,109
101.	May 10, 2022	Open Cup	Audi Field	D.C. United	0–3	New York Red Bulls	(H) (A) Luquinhas, Tolkin, Ryan	8,920
102.	May 28, 2022	MLS	Red Bull Arena	New York Red Bulls	4–1	D.C. United	(H) Luquinhas (2), Morgan, Alfaro (own goal) (A) Kamara	13,678
103.	August 6, 2022	MLS	Audi Field	D.C. United	0–0	New York Red Bulls	(H) (A)	16,258
104.	May 9, 2023	Open Cup	MSU Soccer Park at Pittser Field	New York Red Bulls	1–0	D.C. United	(H) Fernandez (A)	2,396
105.	August 20, 2023	MLS	Red Bull Arena	New York Red Bulls	1–0	D.C. United	(H) Tolkin (A)	17,872
106.	September 23, 2023	MLS	Audi Field	D.C. United	3–5	New York Red Bulls	(H) Benteke (3) (A) Fernandez (2), Harper, S. Nealis, Tolkin	12,591
107.	May 15, 2024	MLS	Audi Field	D.C. United	1–4	New York Red Bulls	(H) Bartlett (A) Elias, Harper, Morgan, Burke	17,417
108.	June 29, 2024	MLS	Red Bull Arena	New York Red Bulls	2–2	D.C. United	(H) Elias, Harper (A) Stroud, Pedro Santos	18,315
109.	April 19, 2025	MLS	Sports Illustrated Stadium	New York Red Bulls	1–2	D.C. United	(H) Choupo-Moting (A) Peglow (2)	18,407
110.	May 24, 2025	MLS	Audi Field	D.C. United	0–2	New York Red Bulls	(H) (A) Harper, Sofo	19,290
111.	April 22, 2026	MLS	Sports Illustrated Stadium	New York Red Bulls	4–4	D.C. United	(H) Hall, Donkor, Ruvalcaba (A) Baribo (3), Hopkins	13,309
112.	October 14, 2026	MLS	Audi Field	D.C. United	2–1	New York Red Bulls	(H) Baribo, Hefti (A) Choupo-Moting	13,319

== Statistics ==
As of October 14, 2026, there have been a total of 112 competitive games between D.C. United and the New York Red Bulls. D.C. has won 48 of these outings, while New York has won 43. The remaining 21 matches ended as draws.

Competition	Matches	DCU wins	Draws	RBNY wins	DCU goals	RBNY goals
MLS regular season	93	38	19	36	145	127
MLS Cup Playoffs	14	8	2	4	18	12
U.S. Open Cup	5	2	0	3	10	11
Total	112	48	21	43	173	151

== Eastern Conference standings finishes ==
D.C. United New York Red Bulls

P.	1996	1997	1998	1999	2000	2001	2002	2003	2004	2005	2006	2007	2008	2009	2010	2011	2012	2013	2014	2015	2016	2017	2018	2019	2020	2021	2022	2023	2024	2025	2026
1		1	1	1	1						1	1			1			1	1	1	1		1								
2	2					2			2	2							2														
3	3		3					3	3			3					3														
4					4	4	4	4		4	4			4					4	4	4		4				4				
5		5					5						5			5								5							
6				6									6									6		6	6						
7														7		7										7			7		
8															8											8		8			
9																															
10																		10											10	10	10
11																						11									
12																												12			
13																									13						
14																											14				14
15																														15	

• Total: New York with 19 higher finishes, D.C. United with 12.

== Winners by year ==
Notes: × Retroactive & unofficial + Points based on regulation wins (3), ties (1), shoot-out wins (1), shoot-out losses (0) & regulation losses (0) Tiebreakers: 1) Goal differential, 2) Away goals for, 3) Previous year winner
Year	Winner	Score
1996	D.C. United	6–4 ×+
1997	NY/NJ MetroStars	6–6 ×+ (goals aggregate 7–6)
1998	D.C. United	9–3 ×+
1999	D.C. United	10–0 ×+
2000	MetroStars	7–4 ×
2001	MetroStars	9–3 ×
2002	D.C. United	9–3
2003	MetroStars	7–4
2004	D.C. United	9–3
2005	D.C. United	7–4
2006	D.C. United	8–2
2007	D.C. United	6–3
2008	D.C. United	4–4 (goals aggregate 5–5) (away goals 1–1)
2009	D.C. United	6–0
2010	N.Y. Red Bulls	4–1
2011	N.Y. Red Bulls	3–3 (goals aggregate 4–1)
2012	D.C. United	4–4 (goals aggregate 8–6)
2013	N.Y. Red Bulls	7–1
2014	D.C. United	6–3
2015	N.Y. Red Bulls	7–1
2016	D.C. United	5–2
2017	N.Y. Red Bulls	7–1
2018	N.Y. Red Bulls	7–1
2019	N.Y. Red Bulls	4–1
2020	N.Y. Red Bulls	3–3 (goals aggregate 2–1)
2021	D.C. United	7–1
2022	N.Y. Red Bulls	4–1
2023	N.Y. Red Bulls	6–0
2024	N.Y. Red Bulls	4–1
2025	N.Y. Red Bulls	3–3 (goals aggregate 3–2)
2026	D.C. United	4–1

== See also ==
- MLS rivalry cups
- I-95 derbies
- Commanders–Giants rivalry
- Capitals–Rangers rivalry
- Capitals–Islanders rivalry
