= List of Miami Fusion seasons =

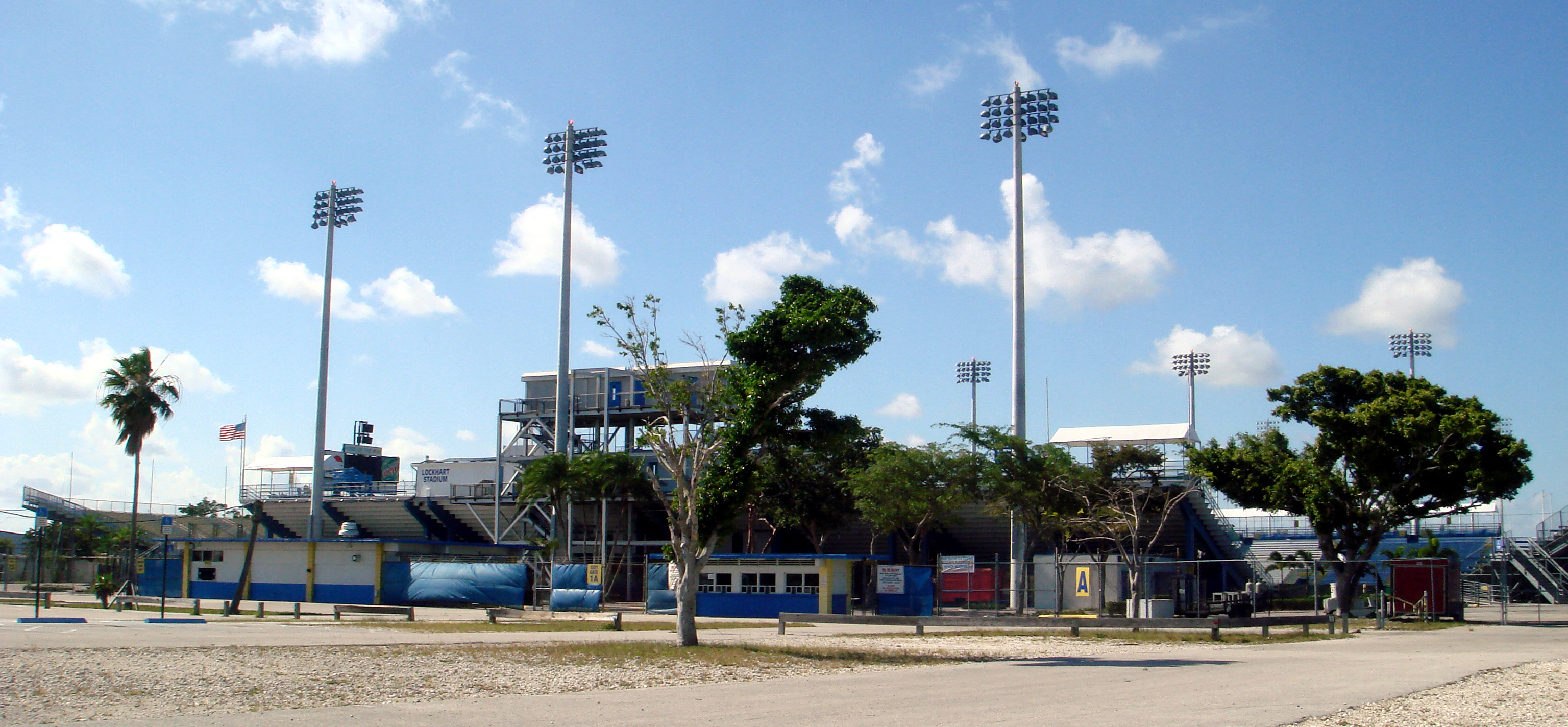
The Miami Fusion played their games at Lockhart Stadium

The Miami Fusion was an American soccer club that competed in Major League Soccer, the top tier soccer league in the United States and Canada. The team played for four seasons from 1998 through 2001 before the franchise went defunct.

The MLS season typically runs from February to October, and the best-performing team in the regular season is awarded the Supporters' Shield. The top teams from each conference qualify for the MLS Cup Playoffs, a postseason tournament that culminates in the MLS Cup. The Fusion won the Supporters' Shield in their last season season. In addition to league play, the Mutiny competed in the annual U.S. Open Cup tournament organized by the United States Soccer Federation.

The club played a total of six seasons in MLS, with 56 wins, 56 losses, and 10 draws over 122 games. The club ceased operations immediately after the 2001 season along with the Tampa Bay Mutiny in the league's first contraction. In 2018, MLS awarded an expansion team in Miami to a group including David Beckham, Jorge Mas, and José Mas. Inter Miami CF began play in 2020 at DRV PNK Stadium, on the site of the old Lockhart Stadium.

== Key ==
Key to colors and symbols

1st or W	Winners
2nd or RU	Runners-up
3rd	Third place
Last	Wooden Spoon
♦	MLS Golden Boot

Key to competitions

- Major League Soccer (MLS) – The top-flight of soccer in the United States, established in 1996.
- U.S. Open Cup (USOC) – The premier knockout cup competition in U.S. soccer, first contested in 1914.

== Seasons ==
Season	League									Position		Playoffs	USOC	Average attendance (Note: Average attendance only includes statistics from regular season matches.)	Top goalscorer(s) (Note: Top goalscorer(s) includes all goals scored in the regular season, MLS Cup Playoffs, U.S. Open Cup, CONCACAF Champions League, FIFA Club World Cup, and other competitive continental matches.)	
Season	Pld	W	L	D	GF	GA	GD	Pts	PPG	Conf.	Overall	Playoffs	USOC	Average attendance	Name(s)	Goals
1998	32	15	17	– (Note: Before the 2000 Major League Soccer season, matches would be settled in a penalty shootout rather than end in a draw.)	46	68	-22	35	1.09	4th	8th	QF	QF	10,284	(Colombia) Diego Serna	11
1999	32	13	19	–	42	59	-17	29	0.91	4th	9th	QF	DNE	8,689	(Colombia) Diego Serna	10
2000	32	12	15	5 (Note: From 2000 to 2004, MLS discouraged draws by playing up to two 5-minute periods of golden goal overtime for tied games.)	54	56	-2	41	1.28	3rd	9th	DNQ	RU	7,460	(Colombia) Diego Serna	16
2001 (Note: The final ten games of the 2001 MLS regular season were cancelled in the wake of the September 11 attacks, which included Miami's games against DC United and the NY/NJ MetroStars.)	26	16	5	5	57	36	+21	53	2.04	1st	1st	SF	Ro16	11,177	(Honduras) Alex Pineda Chacón	19♦ (Note: Chacón won the MLS Golden Boot (47 points))
Total	122	56	56	10	199	219	–20	158	1.30	W (1)	W (1)	SF (1)	RU (1)	–	(Colombia) Diego Serna	52
