= 2001 Miami Fusion season =

Miami Fusion F.C.
2001 season
- Coach: (England) Ray Hudson
- Major League Soccer: 1st in Eastern Division
- Supporters' Shield: Winners
- U.S. Open Cup: Third round
- MLS Cup Playoffs: Semi-finals
- Top goalscorer: Alex Pineda Chacón (19)
- Average home league attendance: 11,177

The 2001 Miami Fusion season was the fourth and final season of the Miami Fusion's existence. They competed in Major League Soccer and played their home matches at Lockhart Stadium in Fort Lauderdale, Florida. They won the club's first and only trophy by securing the Supporters' Shield as the team with the best regular season record. Outside of MLS, they competed in the U.S. Open Cup where they were eliminated by Columbus Crew in the Third Round. Due to financial problems, the club folded in January 2002.

== Non-competitive ==
=== Friendlies ===
January 20	Miami Fusion (United States)	1–4	(Scotland) Rangers	Fort Lauderdale, FL
	Williams 26'		Miller 3', 21', 57', 85'	Stadium: Lockhart Stadium

May 12	Miami Fusion (United States)	0–5	(England) Fulham	Homestead, FL
			Saha 43' (pen.); Clark 57'; Štolcers 65'; Betsy 84'; Lewis 85'	Stadium: Homestead Sports Complex

== Competitive ==
=== Major League Soccer ===
==== Match results ====
April 7 1	Miami Fusion	2–1	Colorado Rapids	Fort Lauderdale, FL
	Pineda Chacón 68', 72'		Spencer 50'	Stadium: Lockhart Stadium; Attendance: 10,411

April 14 2	New England Revolution	0–1	Miami Fusion	Foxborough, MA
			Marshall 55'	Stadium: Foxboro Stadium; Attendance: 15,576

April 18 3	Kansas City Wizards	2–1	Miami Fusion	Kansas City, MO
	Brown 73'; Johnston 77'		Pineda Chacón 72'	Stadium: Arrowhead Stadium; Attendance: 4,420

April 21 4	Miami Fusion	2–1	San Jose Earthquakes	Fort Lauderdale, FL
	Ibsen 39' (o.g.); Pineda Chacón 45'		Russell 51'	Stadium: Lockhart Stadium; Attendance: 8,096

April 28 5	Miami Fusion	1–0	New England Revolution	Fort Lauderdale, FL
	Pineda Chacón 80'			Stadium: Lockhart Stadium; Attendance: 14,381

May 5 6	Columbus Crew	0–0	Miami Fusion	Columbus, OH
				Stadium: Columbus Crew Stadium; Attendance: 13,975

May 19 7	Miami Fusion	3–1	Tampa Bay Mutiny	Fort Lauderdale, FL
	Preki 34' (pen.); Mastroeni 38'; Serna 75'		Valderrama 26' (pen.)	Stadium: Lockhart Stadium; Attendance: 12,412

May 23 8	Colorado Rapids	0–1	Miami Fusion	Denver, CO
			Rooney 79'	Stadium: Mile High Stadium; Attendance: 6,295

May 26 9	Tampa Bay Mutiny	0–4	Miami Fusion	Tampa, FL
			Rooney 20'; Henderson 26'; Serna 67', 90'	Stadium: Raymond James Stadium; Attendance: 12,988

May 30 10	Miami Fusion	2–1	D.C. United	Fort Lauderdale, FL
	Preki 11'; Rooney 71'		Albright 54'	Stadium: Lockhart Stadium; Attendance: 6,524

June 2 11	Dallas Burn	2–6	Miami Fusion	Dallas, TX
	Rhine 8'; Marshall 79'		Marshall 2'; Serna 25', 84', 87'; Pineda Chacón 34'; Mastroeni 52'	Stadium: Cotton Bowl; Attendance: 10,049

June 9 12	Miami Fusion	5–1	Kansas City Wizards	Fort Lauderdale, FL
	Pineda Chacón 22', 83'; Serna 49', 89'; Preki 66'		McKeon 70'	Stadium: Lockhart Stadium; Attendance: 9,154

June 16 13	Miami Fusion	3–3	Los Angeles Galaxy	Fort Lauderdale, FL
	Serna 10', 80'; Rooney 53'		Lalas 28'; Bishop 35' (o.g.); Cienfuegos 45'	Stadium: Lockhart Stadium; Attendance: 11,846

June 30 14	Miami Fusion	4–3	Columbus Crew	Miami, FL
	Preki 29'; Rooney 36'; Serna 42'; Pineda Chacón 49'		Washington 28'; Buddle 55'; Maisonneuve 89'	Stadium: Orange Bowl; Attendance: 14,856

July 4 15	San Jose Earthquakes	1–1	Miami Fusion	San Jose, CA
	Corrales 57'		Preki 21'	Stadium: Spartan Stadium; Attendance: 9,847

July 7 16	Miami Fusion	0–3	Metrostars	Miami, FL
			Villegas 56'; Valencia 67', 73'	Stadium: Orange Bowl; Attendance: 22,370

July 14 17	Los Angeles Galaxy	3–0	Miami Fusion	Pasadena, CA
	Hernández 8'; Frye 85'; Vanney 90+1'			Stadium: Rose Bowl; Attendance: 16,207

July 18 18	Miami Fusion	2–1	Chicago Fire	Fort Lauderdale, FL
	Marshall 23'; Serna 36'		Daniv 72'	Stadium: Lockhart Stadium; Attendance: 6,092

July 21 19	Miami Fusion	1–1	New England Revolution	Fort Lauderdale, FL
	Rooney 42'		Williams 54'	Stadium: Lockhart Stadium; Attendance: 6,123

August 1 20	D.C. United	2–2	Miami Fusion	Washington, D.C.
	Thompson Conteh 30', 33'		Pineda Chacón 55'; Serna 74'	Stadium: RFK Stadium; Attendance: 13,391

August 4 21	Metrostars	2–1	Miami Fusion	East Rutherford, NJ
	Faria 3'; Chung 78'		Preki 49'	Stadium: Giants Stadium; Attendance: 41,794

August 11 22	New England Revolution	1–4	Miami Fusion	Foxborough, MA
	Okoh 6'		Pineda Chacón 16'; Preki 27'; Henderson 35'; Serna 68'	Stadium: Foxboro Stadium; Attendance: 12,003

August 15 23	Chicago Fire	1–2	Miami Fusion	Chicago, IL
	Kovalenko 32'		Pineda Chacón 15'; Serna 38'	Stadium: Soldier Field; Attendance: 14,737

August 18 24	Miami Fusion	4–2	Dallas Burn	Fort Lauderdale, FL
	Pineda Chacón 36', 78'; Preki 51'; Henderson 90'		Kreis 23'; Deering 56'	Stadium: Lockhart Stadium; Attendance: 9,750

August 25 25	Miami Fusion	2–3	Metrostars	Fort Lauderdale, FL
	Pineda Chacón 9', 78'		Faria 48'; Villegas 84'; Hernández 90+1'	Stadium: Lockhart Stadium; Attendance: 18,247

September 8 26	Miami Fusion	3–1	D.C. United	Fort Lauderdale, FL
	Pineda Chacón 3', 26', 70'		Lisi 64'	Stadium: Lockhart Stadium; Attendance: 6,219

=== MLS Cup Playoffs ===
==== Quarterfinals ====
September 22 Game 1	Miami Fusion	2–0	Kansas City Wizards	Fort Lauderdale, FL
	Serna 28'; Pineda Chacón 53'			Stadium: Lockhart Stadium; Attendance: 6,281

September 26 Game 2	Kansas City Wizards	3–0	Miami Fusion	Kansas City, MO
	Lowe 24'; McKeon 31'; Gomez 49'			Stadium: Arrowhead Stadium; Attendance: 5,803

September 29 Game 3	Miami Fusion	2–1	Kansas City Wizards	Fort Lauderdale, FL
	Preki 14'; Henderson 71'		Lowe 13'	Stadium: Lockhart Stadium; Attendance: 8,119

==== Semifinals ====
October 10 Game 1	Miami Fusion	1–0	San Jose Earthquakes	Fort Lauderdale, FL
	Preki 53'			Stadium: Lockhart Stadium; Attendance: 9,236

October 14 Game 2	San Jose Earthquakes	4–0	Miami Fusion	San Jose, CA
	Donovan 16'; Russell 57'; Lagos 69'; De Rosario 89'			Stadium: Spartan Stadium; Attendance: 16,119

October 17 Game 3	Miami Fusion	0–1 (a.e.t.)	San Jose Earthquakes	Fort Lauderdale, FL
			Dayak 94'	Stadium: Lockhart Stadium; Attendance: 11,242

=== U.S. Open Cup ===
June 27 Second Round	Miami Fusion (MLS) (Florida)	4–0	(Florida) Uruguay SC (USASA)	Fort Lauderdale, FL
	Serna 18'; Henderson 24'; Simmonds 32'; Alavanja 43'			Stadium: Lockhart Stadium; Referee: Kermit Quisenberry (USA)

July 11 Third Round	Columbus Crew (MLS) (Ohio)	2–1	(Florida) Miami Fusion (MLS)	Columbus, OH
	Cunningham 52', 89'		Rooney 24'	Stadium: Columbus Crew Stadium; Attendance: 4,316; Referee: Noel Kenny (USA)

== First-team squad ==
Squad at end of season

Note: Flags indicate national team as defined under FIFA eligibility rules; some limited exceptions apply. Players may hold more than one non-FIFA nationality.

No.	Pos.	Nation	Player
1	GK	USA	Jeff Cassar
2	MF	ENG	Ian Woan
3	DF	USA	Carlos Llamosa
4	MF	PLE	Shaker Asad
5	MF	USA	Kyle Beckerman
6	MF	ENG	Ian Bishop
7	DF	USA	Brian Dunseth
8	DF	RSA	Ivan McKinley
9	MF	USA	Lazo Alavanja
10	FW	HON	Alex Pineda Chacón
11	MF	USA	Preki

No.	Pos.	Nation	Player
12	FW	USA	Pete Marino
14	MF	USA	Jim Rooney
15	DF	JAM	Tyrone Marshall
16	FW	JAM	Greg Simmonds
17	FW	COL	Diego Serna
18	GK	USA	Nick Rimando
19	MF	USA	Chris Henderson
22	MF	COL	Johnny Torres
23	MF	USA	Jeff Bilyk
25	MF	USA	Pablo Mastroeni
27	MF	USA	Randy Merkel (on loan from Atlanta Silverbacks)

=== Left club during season ===
Note: Flags indicate national team as defined under FIFA eligibility rules; some limited exceptions apply. Players may hold more than one non-FIFA nationality.

No.	Pos.	Nation	Player
2	DF	USA	Leo Cullen (to New England Revolution)
4	DF	USA	Tim Sahaydak (released)

No.	Pos.	Nation	Player
22	MF	USA	Judah Cooks (on loan from Charleston Battery)
