= 1999 in American soccer =

Soccer in the United States
- Season: 1999

The 1999 season was the 87th year of competitive soccer in the United States.

== National team ==
=== Record ===
Competition	GP	W	D	L	GF	GA
Confederations Cup	5	3	0	2	6	3
U.S. Cup	2	1	0	1	4	3
International Friendly	7	4	2	1	11	6
Total	14	8	2	4	21	12

=== Results ===
The home team or the team that is designated as the home team is listed in the left column; the away team is in the right column.

Win Draw Loss

January 24 International Friendly	Bolivia	0 – 0	United States	Santa Cruz, Bolivia
18:00 UTC−06		(Report)		Stadium: Estadio Ramón Tahuichi Aguilera; Attendance: 39,000; Referee: Juan Carlos Paniagua (Bolivia)

February 6 International Friendly	United States	3 – 0	Germany	Jacksonville, Florida
13:00 UTC−05	Kirovski 16'; Sanneh 24'; Reyna 26'	(Report)		Stadium: Alltel Stadium; Attendance: 17,259; Referee: Gilberto Alcalá (Mexico)

February 21 International Friendly	United States	2 – 1	Chile	Fort Lauderdale, Florida
15:30 UTC−05	Olsen 58'; Lewis 65'	(Report)	Cartes 64'	Stadium: Lockhart Stadium; Attendance: 14,896; Referee: Pascal Rebolledo (Mexico)

March 11 U.S. Cup	United States	3 – 1	Guatemala	Los Angeles, California
17:30 UTC−08	Moore 22'; McBride 37'; Hejduk 90+4'	(Report)	Perez 51' (pen.)	Stadium: Los Angeles Memorial Coliseum; Attendance: 34,154; Referee: Jose Robles (Mexico)

March 13 U.S. Cup	United States	1 – 2	Mexico	San Diego, California
12:30 UTC−08	Hejduk 51'	(Report)	Fraser 14' (o.g.); Abundis 57'	Stadium: Qualcomm Stadium; Attendance: 50,324; Referee: Rene Parra (Canada)

June 13 International Friendly	United States	1 – 0	Argentina	Washington, D.C.
13:00 UTC−04	Moore 88'	(Report)		Stadium: RFK Stadium; Attendance: 40,119; Referee: Rodrigo Badilla (Costa Rica)

July 13 Exhibition game	United States	2 – 1	Derby County	Denver, Colorado
	Lewis 64'; Olsen 76'	(Report)		Stadium: Mile High Stadium; Attendance: 20,376; Referee: Ricardo Valenzuela (United States)

July 24 Confederations Cup Group Stage	New Zealand	1 – 2	United States	Guadalajara, Mexico
	Zoricich 90+3'	(Report)	McBride 25'; Kirovski 58'	Stadium: Estadio Jalisco; Attendance: 60,000; Referee: Ubaldo Aquino (Paraguay)

July 28 Confederations Cup Group Stage	Brazil	1 – 0	United States	Guadalajara, Mexico
	Ronaldinho 13'			Stadium: Estadio Jalisco; Attendance: 54,000; Referee: Gilberto Alcalá (Mexico)

July 30 Confederations Cup Group Stage	United States	2 – 0	Germany	Guadalajara, Mexico
	Olsen 24'; Moore 50'	(Report)		Stadium: Estadio Jalisco; Attendance: 53,000; Referee: Gilberto Alcalá (Mexico)

August 1 Confederations Cup Semifinal	Mexico	1 – 0 (a.e.t.)	United States	Mexico City, Mexico
	Blanco 96'	(Report)		Stadium: Estadio Azteca; Attendance: 65,000; Referee: Kim Young-Joo (South Korea)

August 3 Confederations Cup Third Place Match	United States	2 – 0	Saudi Arabia	Guadalajara, Mexico
21:00 UTC−05	Bravo 28'; McBride 80'	(Report)		Stadium: Estadio Jalisco; Attendance: 35,000; Referee: Ubaldo Aquino (Paraguay)

September 8 International Friendly	Jamaica	2 – 2	United States	Kingston, Jamaica
	Davis 14' (pen.); Johnson 79'	(Report)	Kreis 5'; Albright 80'	Stadium: National Stadium; Attendance: 20,000; Referee: Godfrey Bowen (Cayman Islands)

November 17 International Friendly	Morocco	2 – 1	United States	Marrakesh, Morocco
19:00 UTC±0	Bassir 15'; Hadji 27' (pen.)	(Report)	Wynalda 17'	Stadium: Stade El Harti; Attendance: 18,000; Referee: Gamal El Ghandour (Egypt)

=== Goalscorers ===
Player	Goals
Ben Olsen	3
Brian McBride	3
Joe-Max Moore	3
Jovan Kirovski	2
Frankie Hejduk	2
Eddie Lewis	2
Tony Sanneh	1
Claudio Reyna	1
Paul Bravo	1
Jason Kreis	1
Chris Albright	1
Eric Wynalda	1

== Major League Soccer ==
=== Standings ===
Eastern Conference	P	W	(sw)	(sl)	L	GF	GA	GD	Pts
s – D.C. United	32	23	<6	3>	9	65	43	22	57
x – Columbus Crew	32	19	<6	4>	13	48	39	9	45
x – Tampa Bay Mutiny	32	14	<5	7>	18	51	50	1	32
x – Miami Fusion	32	13	<5	4>	19	42	59	-17	29
New England Revolution	32	12	<5	7>	20	38	53	-15	26
MetroStars	32	7	<3	5>	25	32	64	-32	15

Western Conference	P	W	(sw)	(sl)	L	GF	GA	GD	Pts
y – Los Angeles Galaxy	32	20	<3	4>	12	49	29	20	54
x – Dallas Burn	32	19	<3	6>	13	54	35	19	51
x – Chicago Fire	32	18	<3	5>	14	51	36	15	48
x – Colorado Rapids	32	20	<6	3>	12	38	39	-1	48
San Jose Clash	32	19	<10	3>	13	48	49	-1	37
Kansas City Wizards	32	8	<2	6>	24	33	53	-20	20

- The top four teams in each conference make the playoffs.
  Wins (W) are worth 3 points.
  Shootout Wins (SW) are worth 1 point, and is considered a Win in the standings.
  Shootout Loss (SL) are worth 0 points, and is considered a Loss in the standings.
  Loss (L) are worth 0 points.
- s = Supporters Shield winner
- y = Conference Leader
- x = Clinched playoff berth

=== Playoffs ===
Playoff bracket

Conference Semifinals
1	D.C. United (AET), (3 – 2, S.O.)*	2	1*	x
4	Miami Fusion	0	0	x
Eastern Conference
2	Columbus Crew	2	2	x
3	Tampa Bay Mutiny	0	0	x
1	Los Angeles Galaxy	3	2	x
4	Colorado Rapids	0	0	x
Western Conference
2	Dallas Burn	2	0	3
3	Chicago Fire	1	4	2

Conference Finals
1	D.C. United	2	1	4
2	Columbus Crew	1	5	0
1	Los Angeles Galaxy	2	2	3
2	Dallas Burn	1	3	1

MLS Cup '99
E	D.C. United	2
W	Los Angeles Galaxy	0

- Best of Three series winner will advance.

=== MLS Cup ===
November 21

Los Angeles Galaxy	0 – 2	D.C. United
		Moreno 19'; Olsen 45'

Foxboro Stadium, Foxborough, Massachusetts
Attendance: 44,910

== Lamar Hunt U.S. Open Cup ==
=== Bracket ===
Home teams listed on top of bracket

Second round
A-L	Charleston Battery	2
D3	Wilmington Hammerheads	1
A-L	Staten Island Vipers	7
USASA	United German-Hungarians	0
A-L	Minnesota Thunder	1
PDL	Mid-Michigan Bucks	2
A-L	Seattle Sounders	3
PDL	Spokane Shadow	1
PDL	Cocoa Expos	2
A-L	Jacksonville Cyclones	7
A-L	Rochester Rhinos (ASDET)	2
PDL	New York Freedom	1
A-L	San Diego Flash	7
D3	Arizona Sahuaros	2
A-L	Orange County Zodiac	0
D3	Carolina Dynamo	2

Third round
A-L	Charleston Battery	4
MLS	D.C. United (ASDET)	3
MLS	MetroStars (ASDET)	2
A-L	Staten Island Vipers	3
PDL	Mid-Michigan Bucks	1
MLS	Tampa Bay Mutiny	2
MLS	Colorado Rapids	1
A-L	Seattle Sounders	0
MLS	Dallas Burn	3
A-L	Jacksonville Cyclones	0
A-L	Rochester Rhinos	1
MLS	Chicago Fire	0
A-L	San Diego Flash	2
MLS	Los Angeles Galaxy	3
MLS	Columbus Crew	3
PDL	Carolina Dynamo	0

Quarterfinals
A-L	Charleston Battery	2
A-L	Staten Island Vipers	1
MLS	Tampa Bay Mutiny	0
MLS	Colorado Rapids	1
A-L	Rochester Rhinos	2
MLS	Dallas Burn (ASDET)	1
MLS	Los Angeles Galaxy	1
MLS	Columbus Crew	3

Semifinals
A-L	Charleston Battery	0
MLS	Colorado Rapids	3
A-L	Rochester Rhinos	3
MLS	Columbus Crew	2

Finals
MLS	Colorado Rapids	0
A-L	Rochester Rhinos	2

=== Final ===
September 13

Rochester Raging Rhinos	2 – 0	Colorado Rapids
Miller 65'; Allnutt 90'

Crew Stadium, Columbus, Ohio
Attendance: 4,555
Referee: Tim Weyland

== American clubs in international competitions ==
Club	Competition	Final round
D.C. United	CONCACAF Champions' Cup	Third place
Chicago Fire	CONCACAF Champions' Cup	Third place
Los Angeles Galaxy	CONCACAF Champions' Cup	Qualifying round

=== D.C. United ===
September 29 Champions' Cup Quarterfinal	D.C. United	1 – 0	(Honduras) Olimpia	Paradise, Nevada
	Moreno 68'			Stadium: Sam Boyd Stadium; Referee: Carlos Batres (Guatemala)

October 1 Champions' Cup Semifinal	D.C. United	1 – 3	(Mexico) Necaxa	Paradise, Nevada
	Talley 26'		Alamguer 40'; Delgado 57'; Aguinaga 68'	Stadium: Sam Boyd Stadium

October 3 Champions' Cup Third Place Match	Chicago Fire	2 – 2	D.C. United	Paradise, Nevada
	Razov 71'; Marsch 80'		Wood 2'; Otero 50'	Stadium: Sam Boyd Stadium

=== Chicago Fire ===
September 28 Champions' Cup Quarterfinal	Chicago Fire	2 – 0	(Trinidad and Tobago) Joe Public	Paradise, Nevada
	Razov 19'; Kovalenk 82'			Stadium: Sam Boyd Stadium

October 1 Champions' Cup Semifinal	Chicago Fire	1 – 1 (a.e.t.) (4 – 5 p)	(Costa Rica) Alajuelense	Paradise, Nevada
	Kosecki 38'		Munoz 22'	Stadium: Sam Boyd Stadium
	Penalties
	Podbrożny (penalty scored); Kubík (penalty missed); Dougherty (penalty scored); Razov (penalty scored); Gutiérrez (penalty scored)		Siso (penalty scored); Chinchilla (penalty scored); Smith (penalty scored); Arnáez (penalty scored); Delgado (penalty scored)

October 3 Champions' Cup Third Place Match	Chicago Fire	2 – 2	D.C. United	Paradise, Nevada
	Razov 71'; Marsch 80'		Wood 2'; Otero 50'	Stadium: Sam Boyd Stadium

=== Los Angeles Galaxy ===
August 18 Champions' Cup qualifying round	Los Angeles Galaxy	1 – 1 (a.e.t.) (3 – 4 p)	(Mexico) Necaxa	Pasadena, California
	Vanney 3'		Oliva 74'	Stadium: Rose Bowl
