= Miami MLS team =

Miami MLS team may refer to:

- Miami Fusion (1997–2001)
- Inter Miami CF (2018–present)
