= Carlos Córdoba =

Argentine footballer and coach

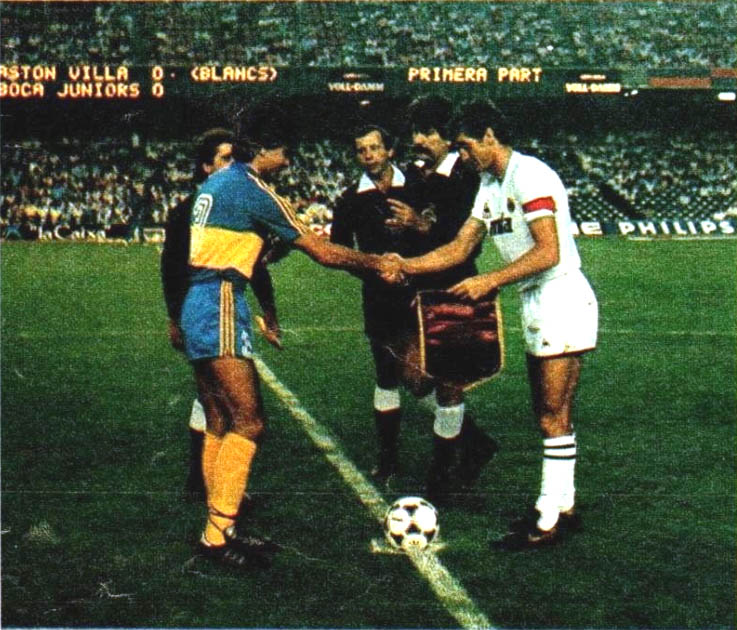
- Córdoba (left) and Dennis Mortimer, captains of Boca Juniors and Aston Villa respectively, in 1984

Personal information
- Date of birth: 5 November 1958 (age 67)
- Place of birth: Argentina
- Position: Left-back

Youth career
- 1972–1975: Boca Juniors

Senior career*
Years	Team	Apps	(Gls)
1975–1984	Boca Juniors		
1985	Tampa Bay Rowdies		
1985-1986	Unión		
1986-1987	Huracán		
1988	Toronto Blizzard	22	(4)
1991	Milwaukee Rampage		
1991	San Diego Sockers		

Managerial career
- 1996–1997: Dallas Burn (assistant coach)
- 1998: Miami Fusion
- 2018–2019: Milwaukee Torrent
- * Club domestic league appearances and goals

Carlos Córdoba (born 5 November 1958) is an Argentine football coach and former player. A left-back, he played for Argentine club Boca Juniors and served as assistant coach of the Dallas Burn and head coach of the Miami Fusion. Córdoba played for Boca Juniors from the age 14 before moving to the United States in 1985 to begin his coaching career.

== Playing career ==
Córdoba spent his entire playing career at Buenos Aires club Boca Juniors. He joined the club at age 14 and joined the first team at age 17. Playing alongside football legend Diego Maradona, he helped the team win three Argentine First Division Championships and one world club title. He captained Boca Juniors from 1983 to 1984 before moving to the US in 1985 with hopes of coaching an MLS club. He played with the Tampa Bay Rowdies, Milwaukee Rampage, and San Diego Sockers in the US, Toronto Blizzard in Canada and Union and Huracon in Argentina.

== Coaching career ==
Córdoba's first professional coaching job was with the Milwaukee Rampage in 1995. In 1996, Córdoba took a job as assistant coach of the Dallas Burn under former US goalkeeper David Dir. In 1998 moved to being head coach of the Miami Fusion until being replaced by Brazilian Ivo Wortmann in July of the same year.

It was announced on 18 December 2018, that Córdoba will be the Milwaukee Torrent's head coach for the 2019 season.
