= Antonio Otero =

American soccer player, midfield

Personal information
- Date of birth: May 20, 1977 (age 49)
- Place of birth: New York City, New York, U.S.
- Height: 5 ft 11 in (1.80 m)
- Position: Midfielder

Senior career*
Years	Team	Apps	(Gls)
1999–2000	D.C. United	25	(0)
1999	→ MLS Pro-40 (loan)	8	(2)
2000	Hampton Roads Mariners	2	(0)
2001	Miami Fusion	0	(0)
2003	Indiana Blast	2	(0)
Total		37	(2)
- * Club domestic league appearances and goals

Antonio Otero (born May 20, 1977) is an American former soccer player who played for D.C. United in the MLS. Antonio played collegiately at American University and was part of the Elite 8 in the 1997–98 season. He was a finalist for the 1998 MAC Hermann Trophy, an award that honors national players of the year in NCAA Division I men's soccer. Antonio also played on the US U-23 National Olympic team and following college, he went on to play in Major League Soccer with DC United and the Miami Fusion. He was a member of the DC United Championship team who won the 1999 MLS cup.

== Career statistics ==
=== Club ===
Club	Season	League			Cup		Continental		Other		Total	
Club	Season	Division	Apps	Goals	Apps	Goals	Apps	Goals	Apps	Goals	Apps	Goals
D.C. United	1999	MLS	12	0	0	0	1 (Note: Appearances in the CONCACAF Champions League)	1	0	0	13	1
D.C. United	2000	MLS	13	0	1 (Note: Appearances in the U.S. Open Cup)	0	0	0	0	0	14	0
D.C. United	Total		25	0	1	0	1	1	0	0	27	1
MLS Pro-40 (loan)	1999	USL A-League	8	2	0	0	–		0	0	8	2
Hampton Roads Mariners	2000	USL A-League	2	0	0	0	–		0	0	2	0
Miami Fusion	2001	MLS	0	0	0	0	–		0	0	0	0
Indiana Blast	2003	USL A-League	2	0	0	0	–		0	0	2	0
Career total			37	2	1	0	1	1	0	0	39	3
