= Screaming Eagles (MLS supporters association) =

- Established: 1995
- Type: Supporters' group
- Team: D.C. United
- Location: Washington, D.C.
- Stadium: Audi Field
- Stand: North Stands
- Membership: 1,000+
- Colors: Black and red
- Website: screaming-eagles.com

The Screaming Eagles are a supporters club of the Major League Soccer (MLS) team D.C. United and of the United States national soccer teams. The group was founded in 1995 by Matt Mathai, and in 2004 it incorporated as a registered 501(c) (4) non profit organization.

The Screaming Eagles are one of the most widely known MLS supporters clubs, and are commonly known for the songs and chants that they perform during games. According to the Screaming Eagles website, the group has over 1,000 active members.

In addition to providing home game support for United, the Screaming Eagles are also known for bringing supporters to away matches. Over their history, the group has organized road trips to every MLS city for D.C. United road matches. Additionally, the group has run a road trip every four years to Mexico City for the fiercely contested CONCACAF World Cup qualifying match between the U.S. national team and the Mexico national team in Estadio Azteca.

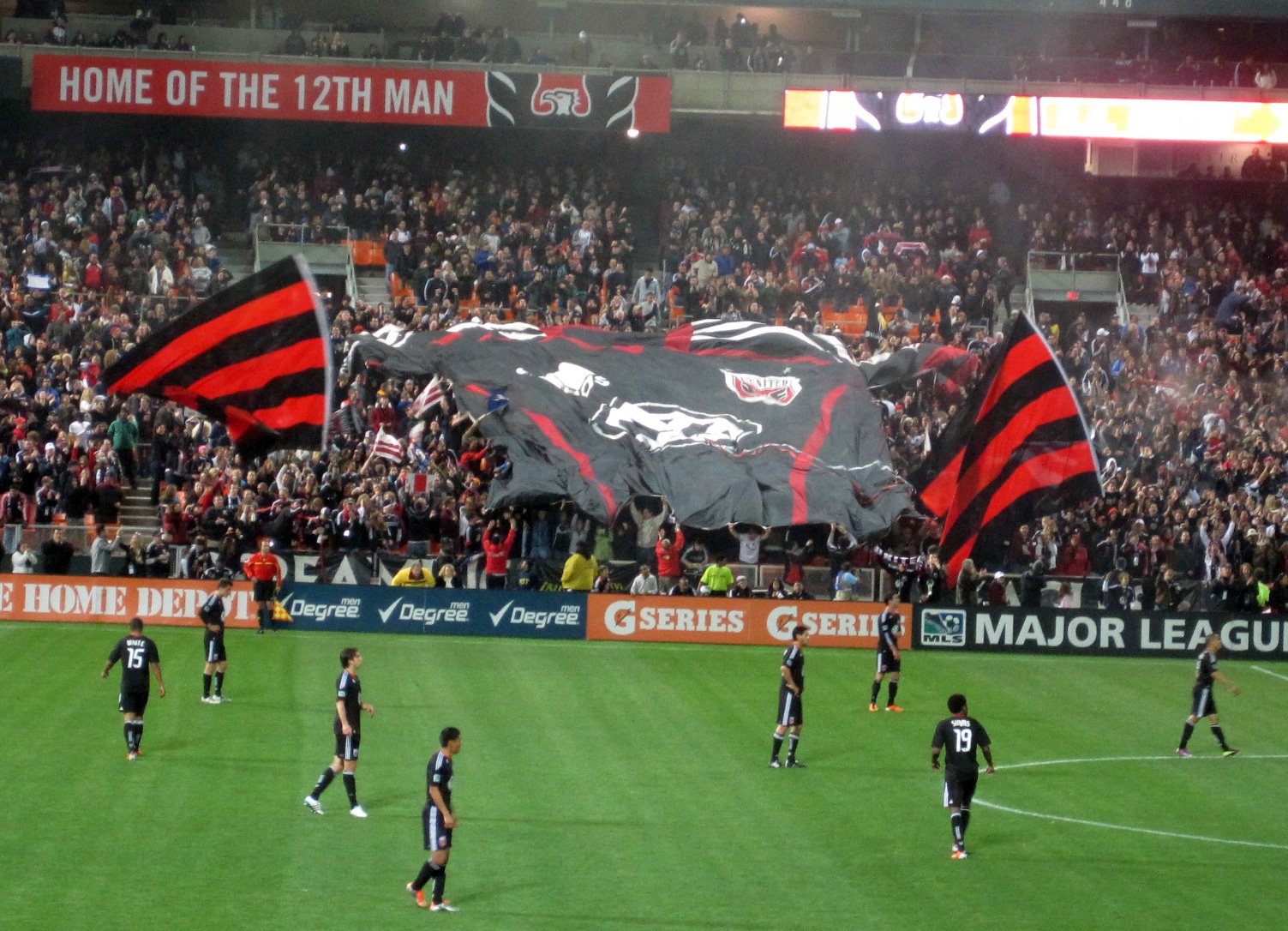
Screaming Eagles celebrating a goal with a large jersey shaped overhead banner.

The Screaming Eagles have hosted tailgates prior to most home games through United's history. During the 20+ years that D.C. United played at RFK Stadium, tailgates were held in the stadium's Lot 8. The However, the group has not announced if tailgates will continue at Audi Field. Screaming Eagles also provide members with soccer-related activities, including viewing parties, the SE Football Club, member get-togethers, and events with D.C. United players.

During D.C. United's time at RFK, the most ardent supporters among SE members gathered in "The Nest" in Sections 132, 133 and 134, and "The Perch" in Sections 230, 231, and 232. Often spotted on television, "The Nest" and "The Perch" rolled with the cheers of excited Screaming Eagles members, keeping the spirits of the team and fellow supporters high regardless of the score. In the new stadium at Audi Field, the Supporters' Section has moved to the North Stands, and the Screaming Eagles have relocated "The Perch" to a section of sideline supporters' rows.

Off the field, the Screaming Eagles place a high value on community outreach work. Over the years, they have worked with several charitable causes including Mike Petke's Kick the Violence Foundation, The Eddie Pope Foundation, DC SCORES, and Kuykenstrong, In 2018, the organization announced a partnership with local nonprofit organization DC SCORES. DC SCORES supports kids in need in D.C. communities through after-school soccer programs, lessons in writing and performing poetry, and neighborhood community service activities. DC SCORES is also the official community partner of D.C. United.

On June 12, 2010, as part of its commitment to supporting the United States men's national soccer team, the Screaming Eagles provided financial support and assisted in organizing an outdoor World Cup viewing - known as "Soccer in the Circle" - in Dupont Circle, Washington, D.C. This event culminated with several thousand attendees viewing the United States' match against England in the 2010 FIFA World Cup and received extensive local, national, and international media coverage.

Membership in the Screaming Eagles is open to anyone who would like to support D.C. United and promote soccer. Violence, racism, sexism, and homophobia are not tolerated and are grounds for expulsion from the club.
