= José Alegría =

Peruvian footballer (born 1980)

Personal information
- Date of birth: October 5, 1980 (age 46)
- Place of birth: Lima, Peru
- Height: 5 ft 8 in (1.73 m)
- Position: Midfielder

Youth career
- Alianza Lima
- Washington Diplomats

Senior career*
Years	Team	Apps	(Gls)
2001–2003	D.C. United	38	(1)
- * Club domestic league appearances and goals

José Alegría (born 5 October 1980) is a Peruvian former footballer.

He holds the MLS record for fastest red card in league history, earning one in 18 seconds during a match on 13 June 2001.

== Career ==
Born in Lima, he moved to the United States when he was 12 and grew up in Springfield, Virginia.

He was initially signed by D.C. United directly out of high school in 1998. However, after participating in their spring training, he was forced to return to Peru in order to obtain a work visa. The process was delayed because he overstayed his initial tourist visa limit and he missed both the 1999 and 2000 seasons as a result. While waiting in Peru, Alegría trained with Alianza Lima, the country's most successful team, and played in the second division.

He joined D.C. United in October 2001 and made 38 league appearances across three seasons with the team, registering one goal and three assists before he was waived in early 2004.
