= Ivo Wortmann =

Brazilian footballer and manager (born 1949)

Personal information
- Full name: Ivo Ardais Wortmann
- Date of birth: 10 March 1949 (age 77)
- Place of birth: Quaraí, Brazil
- Position: Defensive midfielder

Senior career*
Years	Team	Apps	(Gls)
1971–1972	Grêmio		
1973–1976	América-RJ		
1977–1978	Palmeiras		

Managerial career
- 1982–1984: Al-Ahli Doha
- 1985: Grêmio (under-20)
- 1986: Lajeadense
- 1987: Brasil de Pelotas
- 1987: Caxias
- 1987–1990: Saudi Arabia (under-17)
- 1991: América (RJ)
- 1992: Criciúma
- 1992: Qatar
- 1993–1994: Al-Ahli Doha
- 1994: Al-Shabab (KSA)
- 1994–1997: Saudi Arabia (under-23)
- 1998–2000: Miami Fusion
- 2000: Botafogo
- 2000: Coritiba
- 2001: Cruzeiro
- 2001: Coritiba
- 2002: Internacional
- 2002: Botafogo
- 2003: Paysandu
- 2004: Goiás
- 2004–2005: Juventude
- 2005: Dynamo Moscow
- 2006: Fluminense
- 2006–2007: Juventude
- 2007–2008: Al-Wehda
- 2008: Juventude
- 2009: Coritiba
- 2009: Juventude
- 2010: Brasiliense
- 2014–2015: Grêmio (assistant coach)
- 2015–2016: Guangzhou Evergrande (assistant coach)
Medal record
Representing Saudi Arabia (as manager)
FIFA U-17 World Cup
Winner	1989 Scotland
- * Club domestic league appearances and goals

Ivo Ardais Wortmann (born 10 March 1949) is a Brazilian former professional football player and manager.

Ivo Wortmann was a defensive midfielder as a player. He played for América-RJ and for Palmeiras. He coached Saudi Arabia under-16 national team to winning the title in the 1989 FIFA U-16 World Championship.

== Honours ==
=== Manager ===
Saudi Arabia 16

- FIFA U-16 World Championship: 1989
