= Chris Albright =

American soccer player (born 1979)

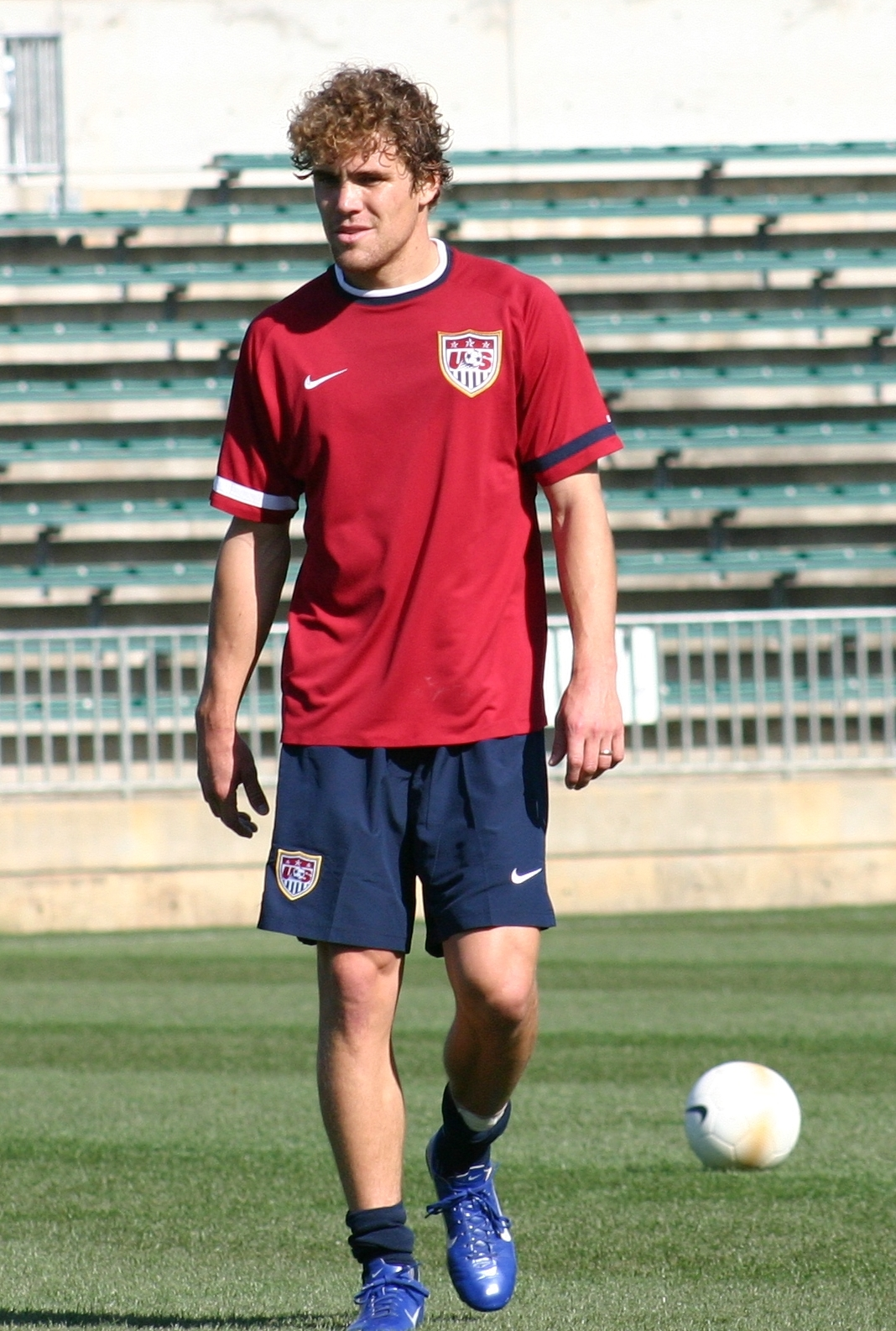
- Albright at a United States practice in 2006

Personal information
- Full name: Christopher John Albright
- Date of birth: January 14, 1979 (age 47)
- Place of birth: Philadelphia, Pennsylvania, U.S.
- Height: 6 ft 1 in (1.85 m)
- Position: Right-back

College career
Years	Team	Apps	(Gls)
1997–1998	Virginia Cavaliers		

Senior career*
Years	Team	Apps	(Gls)
1999–2001	D.C. United	56	(4)
1999	→ MLS Pro-40 (loan)	3	(0)
2002–2007	Los Angeles Galaxy	116	(7)
2008–2009	New England Revolution	27	(0)
2010–2011	New York Red Bulls	26	(0)
2012–2013	Philadelphia Union	10	(0)
Total		238	(11)

International career^{‡}
1999	United States U20	4	(0)
2000	United States U23	6	(2)
1999–2007	United States	22	(1)
- * Club domestic league appearances and goals as of October 26, 2013 ‡ National team caps and goals as of April 4, 2010

Christopher John Albright (born January 14, 1979) is an American former professional soccer player and current general manager for Major League Soccer club FC Cincinnati.

== Youth and college ==
Albright attended William Penn Charter School. A forward early in his career, Albright played college soccer at the University of Virginia for two years; he was named an All-American in 1999.

== Club career ==
Considered one of the best attacking prospects in the country, he leveraged foreign interest into getting assigned to D.C. United, despite the club being low on MLS's pecking order for Project-40 players. The league forced a trade with the Miami Fusion for future considerations, which turned out to be Roy Lassiter, but not until both Albright and Lassiter helped DC to the 1999 MLS Cup.

But Albright's club career did not live up to the lofty expectations. He struggled to find the back of the net, scoring just four goals total in his first three years in the league. D.C. dealt him to Los Angeles Galaxy for a draft pick prior to the 2002 season.

Albright drifted further onto the midfield, and then found himself in the back as the Galaxy's starting right defender for the 2003 and 2004 seasons. With Los Angeles Albright became one of the league's top right-backs, and was honored as an MLS Best XI selection in 2005. During his time with the Galaxy he helped the club capture two MLS Cup and one U.S. Open Cup title. He appeared in 116 league matches, scoring 7 goals.

On January 18, 2008, Albright was traded to New England Revolution in return for allocation money. During the 2008 season Albright was a fixture for New England at right-back appearing in 26 league matches; however during the 2009 season he suffered a season-ending injury that limited him to only one appearance.

Albright was traded to New York Red Bulls on January 14, 2010, in exchange for picks #31 and #48 in the 2010 MLS SuperDraft. After beginning the 2010 season on injured reserve Albright regained his form and became the club's starting right-back and helped New York capture the regular season Eastern Conference title.

Following the 2011 season, the Red Bulls declined the 2012 option on Albright's contract, making him eligible for the 2011 MLS Re-Entry Draft. Albright was not selected in the draft and became a free agent.

On February 13, 2012, Albright signed to play for his hometown Philadelphia Union. He retired at the conclusion of the 2013 season

== International career ==
Albright's first attempt at playing defense came with United States national team coach Bruce Arena, who gave him his first cap on September 8, 1999, against Jamaica. Albright scored his lone U.S. goal that day and has accumulated 21 caps as of 2007.

Albright was listed as an alternate for Bruce Arena's 23-man squad for the 2006 FIFA World Cup in Germany and made the final squad two days after the initial roster announcement due to the injury of Frankie Hejduk. Albright did not appear in a match in the tournament.

=== International goals ===
Goal	Date	Venue	Opponent	Score	Result	Competition
1	September 8, 1999	Kingston, Jamaica	Jamaica	2–2	2–2	Friendly match

== Post-playing career ==
In January 2014, Albright was announced as joining the Philadelphia Union's technical staff as assistant technical director. His responsibilities would focus on assisting in player management and movement along with player and coaching decisions.

In October 2021, FC Cincinnati announced Albright had been hired as the new general manager of the club.

== Career statistics ==
=== Club ===
As of June 29, 2013

Club performance			League		Cup		League Cup		Continental		Total	
Season	Club	League	Apps	Goals	Apps	Goals	Apps	Goals	Apps	Goals	Apps	Goals
USA			League		Open Cup		League Cup		North America		Total	
1999	D.C. United	Major League Soccer	8	0	1	1	0	0	1	0	10	1
2000	D.C. United	Major League Soccer	25	3	3	2	0	0	1	0	29	5
2001	D.C. United	Major League Soccer	23	1	4	2	0	0	0	0	27	3
2002	Los Angeles Galaxy	Major League Soccer	15	0	2	2	5	1	0	0	22	3
2003	Los Angeles Galaxy	Major League Soccer	27	3	3	0	2	0	4	0	36	3
2004	Los Angeles Galaxy	Major League Soccer	24	1	0	0	3	0	0	0	27	1
2005	Los Angeles Galaxy	Major League Soccer	22	1	0	0	4	0	0	0	26	1
2006	Los Angeles Galaxy	Major League Soccer	23	2	0	0	0	0	1	0	24	2
2007	Los Angeles Galaxy	Major League Soccer	5	0	0	0	0	0	0	0	5	0
2008	New England Revolution	Major League Soccer	26	0	0	0	2	0	0	0	28	0
2009	New England Revolution	Major League Soccer	1	0	0	0	0	0	0	0	1	0
2010	New York Red Bulls	Major League Soccer	18	0	3	0	2	0	0	0	23	0
2011	New York Red Bulls	Major League Soccer	8	0	1	0	0	0	0	0	9	0
2012	Philadelphia Union	Major League Soccer	8	0	0	0	0	0	0	0	8	0
2013	Philadelphia Union	Major League Soccer	2	0	0	0	0	0	0	0	2	0
Total	USA		235	11	17	7	18	1	7	0	277	19
Career total			235	11	17	7	18	1	7	0	277	19

=== International ===
As of March 19, 2012

National team	Year	Apps	Goals
United States
United States	1999	1	1
United States	2000	3	0
United States	2001	3	0
United States	2002	0	0
United States	2003	0	0
United States	2004	4	0
United States	2005	7	0
United States	2006	2	0
United States	2007	2	0
Total		22	1

== Honors ==
=== D.C. United ===
- Major League Soccer MLS Cup (1): 1999
- Major League Soccer MLS Supporters Shield (1): 1999

=== New England Revolution ===
- North American SuperLiga (1): 2008

=== Los Angeles Galaxy ===
- Major League Soccer MLS Cup (2): 2002, 2005
- Major League Soccer MLS Supporters Shield (1): 2002
- Lamar Hunt U.S. Open Cup U.S. Open Cup (1): 2005

=== Individual ===
- MLS Best XI: 2005

=== Technical Director ===
Philadelphia Union

- Supporters Shield: 2020

=== General Manager ===
FC Cincinnati

- Supporters Shield: 2023
