= Orlando Perez =

American soccer defender (born 1977)

Personal information
- Full name: Orlando Perez
- Date of birth: July 12, 1977 (age 49)
- Place of birth: Pomona, California, United States
- Height: 5 ft 10 in (1.78 m)
- Position: Defender

Senior career*
Years	Team	Apps	(Gls)
1997–1999	Orange County Zodiac	49	(1)
2000–2002	MetroStars	41	(0)
2002	D.C. United	8	(0)
2002–2004	Chicago Fire	49	(2)
2005–2007	Chivas USA	65	(1)
Total		212	(4)
- * Club domestic league appearances and goals

Orlando Perez (born July 12, 1977 in Pomona, California) is an American soccer defender, who played eight seasons in Major League Soccer.

Perez never played college soccer, but he was drafted twice in MLS, both times by coach Octavio Zambrano. The first came in the first round of the 1999 MLS Supplemental Draft, when Zambrano was with the Los Angeles Galaxy. Perez failed to make the team and played with A-League's Orange County Zodiac. With Zambrano moving to the MetroStars in 2000, he plucked Perez again, this time in the fourth round of the 2000 MLS SuperDraft.

Perez would spend the next two and a half seasons with the Metros, a part-time player his first, a starter at left back his second. Zambrano dealt him midway through the third, to D.C. United with Petter Villegas for Mark Lisi and Craig Ziadie. Perez then became only one of two players in MLS history (Winston Griffiths is the other) to play for three teams in one season as DC traded him the Chicago Fire for a draft pick after only eight games. Perez was in-and-out of the Fire lineup since. He scored two goals in six years in MLS. Perez was taken by Chivas in the 2004 MLS Expansion Draft. He was waived at the end of the 2007 season.
