= Craig Ziadie =

Jamaican-American soccer player (born 1978)

Personal information
- Full name: Craig Ziadie
- Date of birth: 20 September 1978 (age 48)
- Place of birth: Pembroke Pines, Florida, United States
- Position: Defender

College career
Years	Team	Apps	(Gls)
1997–2000	Richmond Spiders		

Senior career*
Years	Team	Apps	(Gls)
2001–2002	D.C. United	19	(0)
2002–2004	MetroStars	57	(1)
Total		76	(1)

International career
2002–2004	Jamaica	26	(0)
- * Club domestic league appearances and goals

Craig Ziadie (born 20 September 1978) is a Jamaican-American soccer player, who last played right back for the MetroStars of Major League Soccer.

== Youth and college ==
Although he was born in Florida, Ziadie grew up in Kingston, Jamaica. He came back to America first to attend high school, and then to play college soccer at the University of Richmond. While at Richmond, Ziadie was a three-time All-Colonial Athletic Association selection, and was named the CAA Player of the Year in his 2000 senior year. He also played for the Palm Beach Pumas of the Premier Development League during his college years.

== Professional career ==
Upon graduating, Ziadie was selected 28th overall by D.C. United in the 2001 MLS SuperDraft. Ziadie surprised many by earning a starting spot in the D.C. lineup, and finished the year with three assists in 18 appearances, 13 of which were starts. Shortly into the 2002 season, however, Ziadie was traded to the MetroStars along with Mark Lisi in exchange for Petter Villegas and Orlando Perez. He quickly earned a starting position with the MetroStars, though, and finished the season with 18 starts. Ziadie has maintained his starting position at right back through most of 2003 and 2004, adding a goal and four assists over 42 games. He was taken by Chivas USA in the 2004 MLS Expansion Draft, but did not sign with the team. Ziadie had an unsuccessful trial with Scottish side Livingston in 2004.

== International career ==
Ziadie also plays for the Jamaica national team; he made his debut for the team 16 October 2002 against Japan, opting not to wait for the United States to call him in. He has since made more than 20 appearances for the team, and has been a fixture at right back during World Cup 2006 Qualifying.

== Personal ==
Ziadie's father, Dennis Ziadie, played in the NASL with the Boston Beacons as well as for the Jamaica national team. Ziadie is a cousin of the American soccer player Mark Chung.
