= Mark Lisi =

American soccer player

Personal information
- Date of birth: October 11, 1977 (age 49)
- Place of birth: Englewood, CO, United States
- Height: 6 ft 1 in (1.85 m)
- Position: Midfielder

Youth career
- 1997–2000: Clemson Tigers

Senior career*
Years	Team	Apps	(Gls)
2001–2002	D.C. United	31	(4)
2002–2006	New York Red Bulls	89	(3)
- * Club domestic league appearances and goals as of 23 November 2006 ‡ National team caps and goals as of 23 November 2006

Mark Lisi (born October 11, 1977) is an American former soccer player who played midfielder for New York Red Bulls of Major League Soccer until his retirement due to debilitating injuries at the finish of the 2006 season. Lisi Court in Franklin Township, NJ is named after him.

== Career ==
Lisi, who was born in Englewood, Colorado, played college soccer at Clemson University from 1997 to 2000. As a freshman, Lisi recorded three goals and six assists, despite starting only four games for the Tigers. As a sophomore, he was named second-team All-American and first-team All-ACC, after scoring 10 goals and 17 assists for the team. His junior season was not as impressive, as he finished with only 5 goals and 6 assists, but he was named first-team All-ACC nevertheless. In his senior season, he scored 14 goals and 8 assists, and was named a first-team All-American. He finished his career at Clemson with 33 goals and 37 assists.

Upon graduating, Lisi was selected third overall in the 2001 MLS SuperDraft by D.C. United. He immediately earned a starting role with a mediocre D.C. team, and finished the year with four goals and five assists in 25 games. However, shortly into the 2002 season, Lisi was traded along with Craig Ziadie to the MetroStars in exchange for Petter Villegas and Orlando Perez. Lisi played mostly as a reserve for the Metros, and finished the year with two goals and an assist in a combined 23 games played. The next year, Lisi saw an enlarged role with the Metros, starting 20 games and finished the year second in the league with 11 assists, along with one goal. However, Lisi lost his starting role in 2004, as Eddie Gaven emerged as a certain starter, and the team acquired Joselito Vaca. He only started eight games, missed a lot of time due to various injuries, yet finished the season with four assists. In 2005, Lisi played in 28 league games, and totalled five assists. In 2006, Lisi saw only nine games for the team, missing almost the entire season due to knee injury, and retired at the end of the season. At the time of his retirement, he was the team's longest-serving player.
