= A. J. Wood =

American soccer player (born 1973)

Personal information
- Full name: Anthony J. Wood
- Date of birth: August 17, 1973 (age 53)
- Place of birth: Pittsburgh, Pennsylvania, United States
- Height: 6 ft 2 in (1.88 m)
- Position: Forward

College career
Years	Team	Apps	(Gls)
1991–1994	Virginia Cavaliers		

Senior career*
Years	Team	Apps	(Gls)
1996–1997	MetroStars	36	(7)
1997	Columbus Crew	19	(4)
1998–2001	D.C. United	74	(14)
1998	→ MLS Pro 40 (loan)	1	(0)

International career
- United States U16
1994–1996	United States U23		
- * Club domestic league appearances and goals

Anthony "A. J." Wood (born August 17, 1973, in Pittsburgh, Pennsylvania) is an American former professional soccer player who played as a forward. Wood played six seasons in Major League Soccer. He was a member of the United States U-16 men's national soccer team at the 1989 FIFA U-16 World Championship and also played for the U.S. at the 1996 Summer Olympics

== Youth ==
Wood grew up in the Washington, D.C. area where he attended high school at the parochial Georgetown Preparatory School. He was a forward on the boys soccer team and was the city high school player of the year in 1990. In 1991, he entered the University of Virginia where he played as a forward on the men's soccer team until 1994. Although never selected as a first or second team All American, he was named the 1994 SoccerAmerica Player of the Year. The Cavaliers won the NCAA championship each of the four years Wood played. He also holds the NCAA tournament record of 13 goals.

== International ==
In 1989, he was a member of the U.S. U-16 national team at the U-16 World Cup. While the U.S. went 1–1–1 and failed to make the second round, it did defeat Brazil, making it the first U.S. team to do so. Beginning in 1994, Wood became a regular on the United States U-23 men's national soccer team as it prepared for the 1996 Summer Olympics. In 1995, he was a member of the U.S. team which went 0–3 at the Pan American Games. Then in 1996, Wood was part of the U.S. Olympic team and saw time in all three games as the U.S. went 1–1–1 and failed to make the second round.

== Professional ==
In 1996, the MetroStars of Major League Soccer (MLS) selected Wood in the 5th round (49th overall) of the 1996 MLS Inaugural Player Draft. This was the league's first draft and the team's began their first season of operation in 1996. Wood spent the 1996 season and thirteen games in 1997 with the MetroStars before being traded to the Columbus Crew for Brian Bliss. At the end of the season, MLS expanded to two cities, Miami and Chicago. In order to build the new teams, MLS held an expansion draft. The Crew did not protect Wood and as a result, on November 6, 1997, the Chicago Fire took him with the 21st selection of the 1997 MLS Expansion Draft. However, Wood never played for the Fire as of January 6, 1998, the team traded him to D.C. United for Jesse Marsch and an exchange of draft picks. On February 5, 2001, Wood was traded to the Kansas City Wizards for a third round draft pick, but was acquired back on May 9 after being waived. On January 16, 2002, Wood retired from playing professional soccer. Since his retirement, he has become active in coaching youth soccer and holds a position with D.C. United as a youth development coach.
