= Petter Villegas =

Ecuadorian-born Puerto Rican footballer (born 1975)

Personal information
- Full name: Petter Enrique Villegas España
- Date of birth: November 15, 1975 (age 50)
- Place of birth: Esmeraldas, Ecuador
- Height: 5 ft 7 in (1.70 m)
- Positions: Midfielder; forward

Youth career
- 1995: Kean Cougars

Senior career*
Years	Team	Apps	(Gls)
1996–1999	NY/NJ Stallions		
1996	→ NY/NJ MetroStars (loan)	3	(0)
1999–2002	MetroStars	88	(15)
2002–2003	D.C. United	18	(2)
2003–2005	Aucas	26	(0)
2004	→ Barcelona SC (loan)	1	(0)
2004	→ Manta (loan)	13	(0)
2005	→ Deportivo Cuenca (loan)	6	(0)
2005–2009	Puerto Rico Islanders	107	(15)
2011	River Plate Puerto Rico	4	(1)
2011–2012	Puerto Rico Islanders	12	(2)

International career^{‡}
2008–2011	Puerto Rico	13	(3)
- * Club domestic league appearances and goals as of December 17, 2011 ‡ National team caps and goals as of December 17, 2011

Petter Villegas (born November 15, 1975, in Esmeraldas) is an Ecuadorian-born Puerto Rican footballer who played for Puerto Rico Islanders in the North American Soccer League.

== Career ==
=== Youth and college ===
Villegas came to the United States with his family as a child, settling in Newark, New Jersey. He attended Saint Benedict's Preparatory School, where he was a three-time New Jersey All State high school player, scoring 34 goals, assisted on 18 more in 1993. In 1999, he was named by The Star-Ledger as one of the top ten New Jersey high school soccer players of the 1990s.

He played one year of college soccer at Kean College, earning first team All-NJAC honors in 1995, before turning professional.

=== Professional ===
Villegas' first taste of Major League Soccer action came in 1996, when he played three games for the MetroStars on loan from the New Jersey Stallions of the USISL. Three years in the minors followed, until the Metros drafted Villegas in the first round of the 1999 MLS Supplemental Draft. He played the next four and a half seasons for the Metros, mostly as a right midfielder, but also as a forward and defender. Villegas' erratic play matched his versatility – brilliant one moment, awful the next – earning him the sarcastic nickname The Greatest Metro Ever. Despite his inconsistency, he scored a number of key goals, including an overtime game winner in a comeback against the Tampa Bay Mutiny in 2000. Overall, Villegas scored 13 goals and 21 assists in his Metro career, adding two goals and two assists in the playoffs.

On May 10, 2002, the MetroStars traded Villegas and defender Orlando Perez to D.C. United for Craig Ziadie and Mark Lisi. At the time of the trade, Villegas had started all seven MetroStars' games that season. He spent the rest of the year with D.C., scoring two goals and adding five assists. Villegas left MLS afterwards, going back to his native Ecuador to play for Aucas, Barcelona SC, Manta and Deportivo Cuenca. In 2005, he came back to the United States, signing with the Puerto Rico Islanders of the USL First Division. He continued with the Puerto Rico Islanders until the end of the 2009 season.

Villegas signed with River Plate Puerto Rico of the USL for the 2011 season, but played just three games before the team was removed from USL Pro due to financial difficulties. He moved back to the Islanders in the North American Soccer League in June. His contract was not renewed at the end of the season.

=== International ===
In 2008, having been a resident of Puerto Rico for three years, Villegas made his debut with the Puerto Rican national team, scoring a goal against the Dominican Republic, which enabled Puerto Rico to advance to the next stage of the 2010 FIFA World Cup qualification.

== Honors ==
=== Club ===
==== Puerto Rico Islanders ====
- USL First Division Championship runners-up: 2008
- Commissioner's Cup: 2008
- CFU Club Championship runner-up: 2009
