= Diego Serna =

Colombian footballer (born 1973)

Personal information
- Full name: Diego Alonso Serna Lopera
- Date of birth: November 3, 1973 (age 52)
- Place of birth: Medellín, Colombia
- Height: 6 ft 1 in (1.85 m)
- Position: Striker

Youth career
- Cortuluá

Senior career*
Years	Team	Apps	(Gls)
1995	Cortuluá		
1996–1997	Independiente Medellín		
1998–2001	Miami Fusion	100	(52)
2002	MetroStars	8	(1)
2002–2003	New England Revolution	5	(1)
2003	Los Angeles Galaxy	10	(3)
2004–2005	Once Caldas		
2005	Deportes Quindío		
2005	Colorado Rapids	1	(0)
2006	Macará		
2007–2008	Fast		
2009	Miami FC	17	(3)
2011	Syracuse Silver Knights (indoor)	8	(3)
2014	Miami Dade FC	3	(1)

Managerial career
- 2014: Miami United (assistant)
- * Club domestic league appearances and goals as of 4 December 2011

Diego Alonso Serna Lopera (born October 2, 1973) is a Colombian football player who last played for Miami Dade FC. He is the all-time leading scorer for the now-defunct Miami Fusion of Major League Soccer.

== Career ==
=== Early Career, Major League Soccer ===
Serna began his career in his native Colombia with Cortuluá and Independiente Medellín, before moving to MLS with the expansion Fusion in 1998. He became the one constant in Miami's lineup for the four years of the team's existence, leading them in goals in points his first three seasons with the club. Overall, he ended up with team records of 100 games, 52 goals, 36 assists, and 140 points in the regular season, and added a goal and an assist in six playoff games. In 2001, he was named to the MLS Best XI.

The Fusion was contracted before the 2002 MLS season, so Serna was picked 4th overall in the 2002 MLS Allocation Draft by the MetroStars, who traded Mark Chung to obtain that pick. Diego only played eight games for the Metros, scoring one goal. He was traded to the New England Revolution in a six-player deal midway through the season, the other principal of which was Mamadou Diallo. Serna only scored one goal for the Revs in five games before his season was ended by an injury. He went back to Colombia to Atlético Nacional and Independiente Medellín, before returning to MLS in the middle of the 2003 season for a stint with the Los Angeles Galaxy, scoring three goals in ten games.

=== Return to South America ===
After spending some time playing in his native Colombia with Once Caldas and Deportes Quindío, Serna returned to MLS with the Colorado Rapids in August 2005. He then played for Macará of Ecuador in 2006, before joining Fast of Brazil in 2007 and 2008.

=== USL ===
Although Serna was an excellent goal-scorer in MLS, after the Miami Fusion was disbanded, he never reached his maximum potential in the league, electing to play in various leagues throughout South America, contributing to his advancement as a well-rounded, professional veteran. In 2009, he returned to Florida, signing with Miami FC scoring a goal, and providing two assists, ensuring a victory in his homecoming game.

=== USL/MISL (Indoor) ===
Serna signed with Syracuse Silver Knights of the American Major Indoor Soccer League on October 11, 2011. He made his debut in a 16–15 win over the Rochester Lancers (2010). He was released from the team January 6, 2012.

=== NAL ===
On May 5, 2014, at age 40, Serna signed with Miami Dade FC to play the 2014 season.

== Honors ==
Miami Fusion

- Major League Soccer Supporters Shield: 2001

Individual

- MLS Best XI: 2001
