= Miami Fusion =

Miami Fusion F.C.
- Full name: Miami Fusion Football Club
- Nickname: Fusion
- Founded: April 9, 1997; 29 years ago
- Dissolved: January 8, 2002; 24 years ago
- Chairman: Ken Horowitz
- League: Major League Soccer
Home colors	Away colors

Miami Fusion F.C. was an American professional soccer club based in the Miami metropolitan area. The club competed in Major League Soccer (MLS) as a member of the Eastern Conference. The team played from 1998 to 2001. Announced in 1997 as one of the league's first two expansion teams, their best season was 2001, when they won the Supporters' Shield with the best regular season finish. In 2002, after four years of lackluster ticket sales and revenues, MLS contracted the Fusion along with its other Florida-based team, the Tampa Bay Mutiny. The Fusion played their home games at Lockhart Stadium.

== History ==
=== Early history ===
Major League Soccer announced a South Florida team in 1998 as one of its first two expansions, along with the Chicago Fire. Miami businessman Ken Horowitz served as owner, the first new investor to join Major League Soccer since its founding in 1995. The team's name, the Miami Fusion, was announced on July 8, 1997, at the Waldorf Astoria Hotel in New York City ahead of the MLS All-Star Game. The Fusion debuted in the 1998 MLS season, playing in the renovated Lockhart Stadium, considered a forerunner to the league's later soccer-specific stadiums.

The Fusion started their inaugural season strong. Led by star midfielder Carlos Valderrama, the Fusion drew 20,450 to their first game at Lockhart Stadium against D.C. United, showing off the possibilities of a more intimate venue designed especially for soccer. Another 3,000 were turned away by police. However, interest waned through the year along with the team's middling performance on the field. The Fusion replaced head coach Carlos "Cacho" Cordoba with Ivo Wortmann after game 19, and the team managed a playoff spot, losing to D.C. By the end of the year their average attendance had dropped to 10,284.

The Fusion continued to struggle both on and off the field for the next two years. After years of disagreement, the commissioner "reassigned" Carlos Valderrama back to Tampa Bay in 1999, and the team replaced head coach Ivo Wortmann with Ray Hudson mid-season in 2000. The team made a dramatic improvement in the 2001 season, winning the Supporters' Shield with the best regular season performance, taking the Eastern Conference, and advancing to the league semifinals. Attendance improved as well, but remained fourth worst in the league with an average of 11,177. In the front office, owner Ken Horowitz struggled with finances. He, along with Robert Kraft of the New England Revolution and Stuart Subotnick of the New York/New Jersey MetroStars, formed a faction among MLS owners who wanted to keep spending down, as opposed to Lamar Hunt and Philip Anschutz who wished to invest in long-term development. Despite the team's improvements, by the end of the 2001 season they had the league's lowest season ticket sales and the lowest revenues from sponsors.

=== Demise ===
Major League Soccer had reportedly lost an estimated $250 million during its first five years. The league's poor financial condition forced MLS to stop the bleeding. During the winter break between the 2000 and 2001 seasons, reports began circulating that MLS was considering trimming the league from 12 teams back to 10 teams. The team considered several measures to improve attendance and popularity, including changing their name to the South Florida Fusion to advertise to a wider geographical area. Rumors began circulating that the league might pull the plug on the Fusion, even though the Fusion had a low-cost stadium lease, and an improved performance in 2001 with increased fan attendance.

MLS announced in January 2002 that it had decided to contract the two Florida franchises, the Fusion and the Tampa Bay Mutiny. Both teams were withdrawn from the league, ceased operations and folded. Major League Soccer's contraction reduced the league from 12 to 10 teams. The league had chosen to fold the Miami Fusion, in part because the Fusion's ownership reportedly lacked financial resources, had been trying to run the Fusion on a bare-minimum budget, and had asked the league to pay some of the club's expenses. Commissioner Garber stated that the Fusion had the lowest revenue in the league, due to fewer season tickets and almost no revenue from corporate sponsorships.

Miami ownership had reportedly experienced $15 million in operating losses since Miami joined the league. The Fusion's owner, Ken Horowitz, described several difficulties with operating an MLS soccer franchise in South Florida. Many Miami residents were not originally from the area and didn't identify with and support local sports teams. Additionally, the MLS season is in the summer, which is different from the youth soccer season, making it difficult to draw youth soccer teams to attend Fusion matches. There were also issues with local summertime heat and rain. Finally, Horowitz identified a lack of corporate support for the team.

On April 2, 2015, a new club with the name Miami Fusion FC joined the fourth-tier National Premier Soccer League. The club folded in 2018.

MLS returned to the South Florida area in 2018, when Inter Miami CF was announced. On January 29, 2018, the Miami Beckham United group, four years after the ownership's original announcement of pursuing a team, was awarded the twenty-fifth MLS franchise and launched in the 2020 season, playing on the site of Lockhart Stadium at the new Chase Stadium from 2020 to 2025 until Nu Stadium was built within Miami city limits in 2026. Former Fusion coach Ray Hudson would go on to work as a color commentator for Inter Miami, while former Fusion player Chris Henderson is the club's current Sporting Director.

== Stadium ==
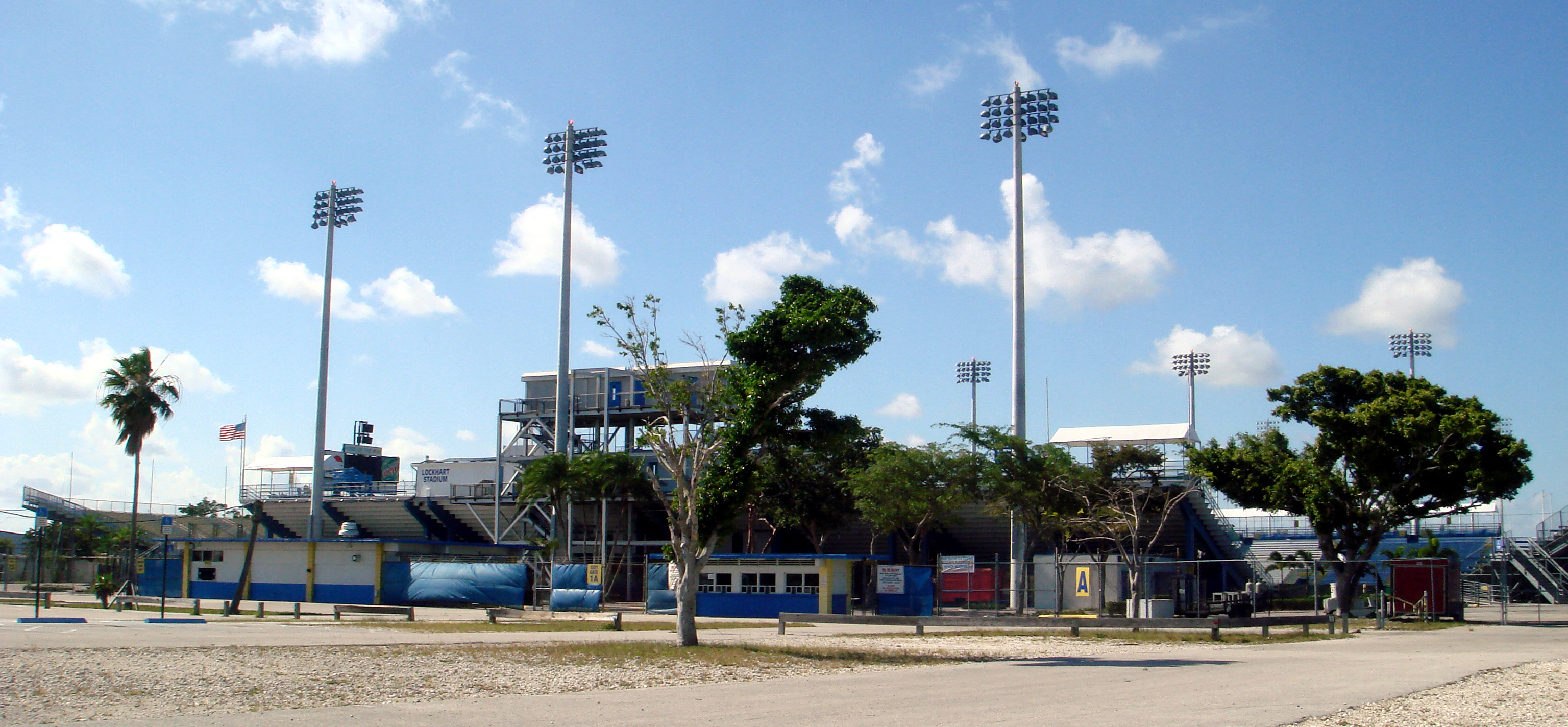
Lockhart Stadium

The Fusion played their home games at Fort Lauderdale's Lockhart Stadium. They had originally intended to play at the Miami Orange Bowl in downtown Miami, but could not reach an agreement with the city of Miami, as the city wanted a 10-year lease and a prohibition on the team relocating to another South Florida stadium. Subsequently, the Fusion reached an agreement with the Broward County School Board and the city of Fort Lauderdale to use Lockhart Stadium.

Originally constructed as a high school football and track stadium in 1959, Lockhart had hosted the Fort Lauderdale Strikers of the original North American Soccer League from 1977 to 1983, as well as other soccer games. Fusion owner Ken Horowitz spearheaded a $5 million renovation that converted Lockhart into a 20,000-seat soccer-specific stadium. The new stadium was the first of its kind in Major League Soccer; at the time all other teams played in much larger football stadiums. This innovation set a trend for similar facilities throughout the league that continues today.

The stadium site was redeveloped in 2019 and 2020 with the construction of Chase Stadium for Major League Soccer club Inter Miami CF which served as the team's interim home until Nu Stadium was completed in 2026, where it become the full-time home of Inter Miami CF II.

== Honors ==
- Supporters' Shield
  - Winners: 2001
- MLS Eastern Conference (Regular Season)
  - Winners: 2001

== Year-by-year ==
Season	League									Position		Playoffs	USOC	Average attendance (Note: Average attendance include statistics from league matches only.)	Top goalscorer(s) (Note: Top goalscorer(s) includes all goals scored in League, MLS Cup playoffs, U.S. Open Cup, CONCACAF Champions League, FIFA Club World Cup, and other competitive continental matches.)	
Season	Pld	W	L	D	GF	GA	GD	Pts	PPG	Conf.	Overall	Playoffs	USOC	Average attendance	Name(s)	Goals
1998	32	15	17	– (Note: Before the 2000 Major League Soccer season, matches would be settled in a penalty shootout rather than end in a draw.)	46	68	–22	35	1.09	4th	8th	QF	QF	10,284	(Colombia) Diego Serna	11
1999	32	13	19	–	42	59	–17	29	0.91	4th	9th	QF	DNE	8,689	(Colombia) Diego Serna	10
2000	32	12	15	5 (Note: From 2000 to 2004, MLS discouraged draws by playing up to two 5-minute periods of golden goal overtime for tied games.)	54	56	−2	41	1.28	3rd	9th	DNQ	RU	7,460	(Colombia) Diego Serna	16
2001 (Note: The final ten games of the 2001 MLS regular season were cancelled in the wake of the September 11 attacks, which included Miami's games against DC United and the NY/NJ MetroStars.)	26	16	5	5	57	36	+21	53	2.04	1st	1st	SF	Ro16	11,177	(Honduras) Alex Pineda Chacón	19♦ (Note: Chacón won the MLS Golden Boot (47 points))
Total	122	56	56	10	199	219	–20	158	1.30	W (1)	W (1)	SF (1)	RU (1)	–	(Colombia) Diego Serna	52

== Team records ==
- Games:
  (United States) Pablo Mastroeni (100)
  (Colombia) Diego Serna (100)
- Goals:
  (Colombia) Diego Serna (52)
- Assists:
  (Colombia) Diego Serna (36)
- Clean sheets:
  (United States) Jeff Cassar (7)
  (United States) Nick Rimando (7)

== Head coaches ==
Name	Country	Hired	Fired
Carlos Córdoba	(Argentina)	November 4, 1997	July 24, 1998
Ivo Wortmann	(Brazil)	July 25, 1998	May 8, 2000
Ray Hudson	(England)	May 8, 2000	January 8, 2002

== See also ==
- List of Major League Soccer defunct clubs
- Fort Lauderdale–Tampa Bay rivalry
