= 1999 USL A-League =

USL A-League
- Season: 1999
- Champions: Minnesota Thunder (1st Title)
- Premiers: Rochester Raging Rhinos (2nd Title)
- Matches: 420
- Goals: 1,427 (3.4 per match)
- Best Player: (United States) John Swallen, Minnesota Thunder
- Top goalscorer: (Canada) Niall Thompson, Vancouver 86ers, (United States) Mark Baena, Seattle Sounders (20 goals)
- Best goalkeeper: (United States) John Swallen, Minnesota Thunder

The 1999 USL A-League was an American Division II league run by the United Soccer League during the summer of 1999.

== Regular season ==
=== Eastern Conference ===
==== Northeast Division ====
Pos	Team	Pld	W	PKW	PKL	L	GF	GA	GD	BP	Pts
1	Rochester Rhinos	28	20	2	1	5	47	20	+27	7	92
2	Staten Island Vipers	28	17	2	1	8	53	31	+22	9	82
3	Long Island Rough Riders	28	15	3	0	10	57	44	+13	8	74
4	Pittsburgh Riverhounds	28	15	1	1	11	63	43	+20	9	72
5	Lehigh Valley Steam	28	13	2	1	12	42	44	−2	6	63
6	Boston Bulldogs	28	12	0	5	11	49	36	+13	8	61
7	Toronto Lynx	28	11	1	3	13	49	36	+13	2	51
8	Connecticut Wolves	28	7	0	1	20	32	68	−36	5	34

==== Atlantic Division ====
Pos	Team	Pld	W	PKW	PKL	L	GF	GA	GD	BP	Pts
1	Hershey Wildcats	28	15	2	1	10	54	33	+21	10	75
2	Richmond Kickers	28	14	3	1	10	51	44	+7	6	69
3	Charleston Battery	28	14	1	4	9	43	39	+4	6	68
4	Atlanta Silverbacks	28	12	3	2	11	51	61	−10	6	62
5	Jacksonville Cyclones	28	12	1	1	14	51	61	−10	9	60
6	Hampton Roads Mariners	28	10	5	2	11	45	41	+4	5	57
7	Raleigh Express	28	9	2	2	15	32	50	−18	5	47
8	Maryland Mania	28	2	1	1	24	16	85	−69	2	13

=== Western Conference ===
==== Central Division ====
Pos	Team	Pld	W	PKW	PKL	L	GF	GA	GD	BP	Pts
1	Minnesota Thunder	28	18	4	4	2	57	17	+40	6	90
2	MLS Project 40	28	15	2	0	11	44	46	−2	4	68
3	New Orleans Storm	28	14	0	0	14	56	61	−5	11	67
4	Indiana Blast	28	11	2	2	13	43	51	−8	5	55
5	Milwaukee Rampage	28	11	2	1	14	44	49	−5	5	54
6	Tennessee Rhythm	28	9	2	3	14	44	52	−8	6	49
7	Cincinnati Riverhawks	28	5	2	3	18	45	71	−26	7	34

==== Pacific Division ====
Pos	Team	Pld	W	PKW	PKL	L	GF	GA	GD	BP	Pts
1	San Diego Flash	28	18	2	3	5	65	30	+35	11	90
2	Vancouver 86ers	28	17	2	2	7	77	31	+46	10	84
3	Seattle Sounders	28	16	3	1	8	56	36	+20	10	81
4	Orange County Zodiac	28	13	4	3	8	59	49	+10	10	73
5	El Paso Patriots	28	12	0	2	14	49	59	−10	6	56
6	San Francisco Bay Seals	28	7	2	4	15	37	54	−17	4	40
7	Sacramento Geckos	28	0	0	1	27	16	91	−75	0	1

== Conference Quarterfinals ==
=== Eastern Conference ===
September 10, 1999

Rochester Rhinos (NY)	2–1	Lehigh Valley Steam (PA)
Carlos Zavala 70'; Mauro Biello 72'		89' Ian Checcio

Frontier Field, Rochester, New York
Attendance: 8,437

September 11, 1999

Staten Island Vipers (NY)	3–2 (OT)	Richmond Kickers (VA)
Ernest Inneh 27', 57'; Martin Dugas 97'		30', 80' Gary Glasgow

Mitchel Field, Uniondale, New York
Attendance: 1,452

September 11, 1999

Long Island Rough Riders (NY)	3–4	Pittsburgh Riverhounds (PA)
Cordt Weinstein 52'; Darko Kolic 68'; John Wolyniec 87'		35' Goran Vasic; 40' Justin Evans; 75' Joenal Castma; 77' Allen Eller

Mitchel Field, Uniondale, New York
Attendance: 1,452

September 11, 1999

Hershey Wildcats (PA)	3–2	Charleston Battery (SC)
Gino DiFlorio 54'; Greg Simmonds 70'; Chris Penny (red card) 73'; John Smith 90'		58', 88' Dean Sewell; (red card) 73' Mike Burke; (red card) 73' Paul Conway

Hersheypark Stadium, Hershey, Pennsylvania
Attendance: 2,299

=== Western Conference ===
September 10, 1999

San Diego Flash (CA)	3–1	El Paso Patriots (TX)
Kevin Legg 26', 70'; 90' (pen.)		9' Victor Castro

Douglas Stadium, San Diego, California
Attendance: 2,984

September 10, 1999

Vancouver 86ers (BC)	1–3	MLS Project 40
Chris Dailly 85'		39' Alen Kozić; 69', 84' Kirk Wilson; (red card) 70' Jason Moore

Swangard Stadium, Burnaby, British Columbia
Attendance: 5,050

September 11, 1999

Minnesota Thunder (MN)	4–0	New Orleans Storm (LA)
Craig Gaunt 33' (o.g.); Stoian Mladenov 65'; Gerard Lagos 78', 84'

National Sports Center, Blaine, Minnesota
Attendance: 1,560

September 11, 1999

Seattle Sounders (WA)	6–3	Orange County Zodiac (CA)
Sean Henderson 17', 44' (pen.); Mark Baena 26'; Jose Vasquez 38' (o.g.); Kieran Barton (yellow card) 59'; Ian Russell 64', 87'	Report	5' Jason Boyce; (yellow card) 9' P.J. Polowski; (yellow card) 42' Mark Foster; (red card) 52' Shawn Saunders; 62' Jose Vasquez; (yellow card) 68' Jason Boyce; (yellow card) 71' Martín Vásquez; 73' Gustavo Leal; (red card) 83' Peter Lak

Renton Memorial Stadium, Renton, Washington
Attendance: 2,984
Referee: David Bragg (USA)

== Conference semifinals ==
=== Eastern Conference Semifinal 1 ===
September 16, 1999

Hershey Wildcats (PA)	2–0	Staten Island Vipers (NY)
Jamel Mitchell 65'; Matthew Ford 84'

Hersheypark Stadium, Hershey, Pennsylvania
Referee: Rob Sheker

September 18, 1999

Staten Island Vipers (NY)	0–2	Hershey Wildcats (PA)
		37', 84' Jamel Mitchell; (red card) 67' Kyle Swords

Hersheypark Stadium, Hershey, Pennsylvania
Attendance: 1,085

The Hershey Wildcats advanced to the Eastern Conference finals.

=== Eastern Conference Semifinal 2 ===
September 18, 1999

Rochester Rhinos (NY)	6–2	Pittsburgh Riverhounds (PA)
Doug Miller (1:30); Darren Tilley (8:30); Yari Allnutt (18:00); Mauro Biello (50:00)	Report	(38:10) Justin Evans (87:00) Goran Vasic

Frontier Field, Rochester, New York
Attendance: 9,127

September 25, 1999
7:35 PM EST

Pittsburgh Riverhounds (PA)	1–0	Rochester Rhinos (NY)
Mike Apple 65'	Report

Bethel Park High School, Bethel, Pennsylvania
Attendance: 4,115

September 28, 1999

Rochester Rhinos (NY)	2–0	Pittsburgh Riverhounds (PA)
Doug Miller 35'; Tim Hardy (yellow card) 43'; Nate Daligcon 49'; Mali Walton (yellow card) 52'	https://www.newspapers.com/image/136563379/?terms=Rhinos Report	(yellow card) 29' Gary DePalma; (yellow card) 44' (yellow-red card) 64' Tenywa Bonseu

Frontier Field, Rochester, New York
Attendance: 6,541

The Rochester Rhinos advanced to the Eastern Conference finals.

=== Western Conference Semifinal 1 ===
September 18, 1999

Minnesota Thunder (MN)	1–0 (OT)	MLS Project 40
Paul Schneider 105'

National Sports Center, Blaine, Minnesota
Attendance: 1,578

September 20, 1999

Minnesota Thunder (MN)	2–0	MLS Project 40
Gerard Lagos 28'; Stoian Mladenov 42'		(red card) 89' Judah Cooks

National Sports Center, Blaine, Minnesota
Attendance: 946

The Minnesota Thunder advanced to the Western Conference final.

=== Western Conference Semifinal 2 ===
September 18, 1999

San Diego Flash (CA)	6–0	Seattle Sounders (WA)
Chugger Adair 3'; Antonio Robles (yellow card) 23'; Carlos Farias 34', 53', 60', 84' (pen.); Mauricio Alegre 87'	Report	(red card) 23' Ollie Heald

Merrill Douglas Stadium San Diego, California
Attendance: 2,116
Referee: Kari Seitz

September 25, 1999

Seattle Sounders (WA)	0–1	San Diego Flash (CA)
Jason Annicchero (red card) 82'	Report	11' Jerome Watson

Renton Memorial Stadium Seattle, Washington
Attendance: 4,426
Referee: Kevin Stott

The San Diego Flash advanced to the Western Conference final.

== Conference finals ==
=== Eastern Conference ===
October 3, 1999
7:35 PM EST

Hershey Wildcats (PA)	2–1	Rochester Rhinos (NY)
Greg Simmonds 15'; Jamel Mitchell 79'		Doug Miller

Hersheypark Stadium, Hershey, Pennsylvania
Attendance: 6,541

October 9, 1999
7:35 PM EST

Rochester Rhinos (NY)	1–0	Hershey Wildcats (PA)
Doug Miller 80'

Frontier Field, Rochester, New York
Attendance: 9,024

October 11, 1999
7:35 PM EST

Rochester Rhinos (NY)	3–1	Hershey Wildcats (PA)
Mauro Biello 20'; Doug Miller 81' (pen.); Yari Allnutt 85'		78' Tim Leonard

Frontier Field, Rochester, New York
Attendance: 7,753

The Rochester Rhinos advanced to the final.

=== Western Conference ===
October 2, 1999
7:35 PM

Minnesota Thunder (MN)	4–1	San Diego Flash (CA)
Paweł Nowak 10'; Stoian Mladenov 58' (pen.); Amos Magee 63', 88'		29' Jamie Munro

National Sports Center, Blaine, Minnesota
Attendance: 2,072

October 7, 1999
7:35 PM PST

San Diego Flash (CA)	1–2	Minnesota Thunder (MN)
Nate Hetherington 83'	Report	(yellow card) 7' (yellow-red card) 14' Morgan Zeba; 27' Amos Magee; 80' (pen.) Kalin Bankov

San Diego Mesa College, San Diego, California
Attendance: 2,983

The Minnesota Thunder advanced to the final.

== Final ==
October 16, 1999
7:05 PM

Minnesota Thunder (MN)	2–1	Rochester Rhinos (NY)
Gerard Lagos 43'; Paweł Nowak 47'		57' Darren Tilley

National Sports Center, Blaine, Minnesota
Attendance: 9,987

MVP: Amos Magee, Minnesota Thunder

== Points leaders ==
Rank	Scorer	Club	Goals	Assists	Points
1	(Canada) Niall Thompson	Vancouver 86ers	20	7	47
2	(United States) Mark Baena	Seattle Sounders	20	6	46
2	(Cuba) Eduardo Sebrango	Vancouver 86ers	18	10	46
4	(Serbia) Darko Kolic	Long Island Rough Riders	17	9	43
5	(United States) Steve Patterson	Orange County Zodiac	19	4	42
6	(United States) Jamel Mitchell	Hershey Wildcats	15	9	39
6	(Nigeria) Ernest Inneh	Staten Island Vipers	18	3	39
8	(Jamaica) Greg Simmonds	Hershey Wildcats	16	6	38
9	(Jamaica) Onandi Lowe	Richmond Kickers	15	7	37
9	(United States) John Wolyniec	Long Island Rough Riders	15	7	37
9	(Canada) John Sulentic	Vancouver 86ers	9	19	37
12	(Chile) Carlos Farias	San Diego Flash	15	6	36
12	(United States) Ian Russell	Seattle Sounders	14	8	36
14	(Trinidad and Tobago) Gary Glasgow	Richmond Kickers	14	7	35
15	(Jamaica) Patrick Beech	New Orleans Storm	16	2	34
16	(United States) Paul Conway	Charleston Battery	14	5	33
17	(United States) Dan Stebbins	Milwaukee Rampage	10	12	32
18	(United States) Mac Cozier	Jacksonville Cyclones	13	4	30
18	(Argentina) Gustavo Leal	Orange County Zodiac	13	4	30
18	(Romania) Mugurel Dumitru	San Diego Flash	9	12	30

== Honors ==
- MVP: (United States) John Swallen
- Leading goal scorer: (Canada) Niall Thompson
- Leading goalkeeper: (United States) John Swallen
- Defender of the Year: (United States) Scott Schweitzer
- Rookie of the Year: (Jamaica) Greg Simmonds
- Coach of the Year: (England) Paul Riley
- Referee of the Year: Glenn Prechac
- First Team All League
  - Goalkeeper: (United States) John Swallen
  - Defenders: (Trinidad and Tobago) Craig Demmin, (United States) Scott Schweitzer, (Uganda) Tenywa Bonseu, (Bulgaria) Kalin Bankov
  - Midfielders: (Chile) Carlos Farias, (Canada) Mauro Biello, (United States) Mac Cozier
  - Forwards: (United States) Mark Baena, (Nigeria) Ernest Inneh, (Canada) Niall Thompson
- Second Team All League
  - Goalkeeper: (Canada) Pat Onstad
  - Defenders: (Mexico) Jose Vasquez, (United States) John Coughlin, (Haiti) Gilbert Jean-Baptiste
  - Midfielders: (United States) Ian Russell, (Canada) John Sulentic, (Trinidad and Tobago) Marvin Oliver
  - Forwards: (United States) Jamel Mitchell, (United States) Paul Conway, (Serbia) Darko Kolic, (Jamaica) Onandi Lowe
