= 2001 USL A-League =

USL A-League
- Season: 2001
- Teams: 25
- Champions: Rochester Raging Rhinos (3rd Title)
- Regular season: Richmond Kickers (1st Title)
- Matches: 273
- Goals: 850 (3.11 per match)
- Best Player: (United States) Paul Conway, Charleston Battery
- Top goalscorer: (United States) Paul Conway, Charleston Battery (22 goals)
- Best goalkeeper: (United States) Jon Busch, Hershey Wildcats

The 2001 USL A-League was an American Division II league run by the United Soccer Leagues during the summer of 2001.

== Summary ==
The addition of the Portland Timbers saw the renewal of a Pacific Northwest rivalry between them, the Seattle Sounders and Vancouver Whitecaps which dated back to the North American Soccer League. Although Vancouver was not new to the league, this was the first season they competed in under the Whitecaps name, replacing the 86ers name used since 1986.

An ownership change in August 2000 brought a revival of the old Whitecaps name for the 2001 season. At the end of the regular season, the Richmond Kickers topped the league with seventy-six points. The playoffs were scheduled to begin on September 12, but those matches were postponed by a week due to the September 11 attacks. Midfielder Mickey Trotman, a starter for the Rochester Rhinos, was killed in an automobile accident two days before the team's first semifinal match with the Milwaukee Rampage. The Rhinos defeated the Hershey Wildcats to take its third league title in four seasons.

== League standings ==
=== Northern Conference ===
Pos	Team	Pld	W	D	L	GF	GA	GD	BP	Pts
1	Hershey Wildcats	26	16	3	7	45	20	+25	8	75
2	Rochester Raging Rhinos	26	16	4	6	43	27	+16	6	74
3	Pittsburgh Riverhounds	26	10	4	12	39	39	0	6	50
4	Montreal Impact	26	10	2	14	29	37	−8	3	45
5	Connecticut Wolves	26	9	6	11	30	37	−7	1	43
6	Long Island Rough Riders	26	6	4	16	31	50	−19	5	33
7	Toronto Lynx	26	7	3	16	20	41	−21	1	32

=== Central Conference ===
Pos	Team	Pld	W	D	L	GF	GA	GD	BP	Pts
1	Richmond Kickers	26	16	3	7	47	34	+13	9	76
2	Charleston Battery	26	16	1	9	51	34	+17	8	73
3	Charlotte Eagles	26	14	2	10	50	41	+9	8	66
4	Nashville Metros	26	14	2	10	47	48	−1	5	63
5	Atlanta Silverbacks	26	13	1	12	48	39	+9	6	59
6	Indiana Blast	26	8	0	18	38	55	−17	3	35
7	Cincinnati Riverhawks	26	6	0	20	39	80	−41	3	27

=== Western Conference ===
Pos	Team	Pld	W	D	L	GF	GA	GD	BP	Pts
1	Vancouver Whitecaps	26	16	2	8	44	33	+11	8	74
2	San Diego Flash	26	14	1	11	55	42	+13	11	68
3	Milwaukee Rampage	26	14	2	10	45	40	+5	5	63
4	Portland Timbers	26	13	3	10	41	38	+3	7	62
5	Seattle Sounders	26	13	1	12	40	39	+1	4	57
6	Minnesota Thunder	26	9	2	15	29	34	−5	3	41
7	El Paso Patriots	26	8	4	14	39	42	−3	4	40

== Playoffs ==
=== Bracket ===
First Round
8	Charlotte Eagles	0	2	2
9	Portland Timbers	2	3	5
5	San Diego F.C.	2	2	4
12	Atlanta Silverbacks	0	2	2
7	Charleston Battery	1	1	2
10	Pittsburgh Riverhounds	2	3	5
6	Milwaukee Rampage (p)	3	0	3 (4)
11	Nashville Metros	2	1	3 (2)

Quarterfinals
1	Hershey Wildcats	2	1	3
Portland Timbers	0	0	0
4	Vancouver Whitecaps	0	4	4
San Diego F.C.	2	1	3
2	Rochester Raging Rhinos	1	3	4
Pittsburgh Riverhounds	2	0	2
3	Richmond Kickers	2	1	3
Milwaukee Rampage (a.e.t.)	2	2	4

Semifinals
Hershey Wildcats	4	0	4
Vancouver Whitecaps	0	1	1
Rochester Raging Rhinos	3	1	4
Milwaukee Rampage	2	0	2

Final
Hershey Wildcats	0
Rochester Raging Rhinos	2

== First round ==
=== Pittsburgh vs Charleston ===
September 20, 2001
7:35 PM (EDT)

Pittsburgh Riverhounds (PA)	2–1	Charleston Battery (SC)
Gary DePalma 45'; Phil Karn 76'	Report	(yellow card) 36' (yellow-red card) 44' John Ball; 38' Paul Conway

Bethel Park Stadium, Bethel Park, Pennsylvania
Attendance: 1,152

September 22, 2001
7:30 PM (EDT)

Charleston Battery (SC)	1–3	Pittsburgh Riverhounds (PA)
Mac Cozier 22'; Jukka Rantala (yellow card) 45'; Mac Cozier (yellow card) 50'; Dan Calichman (yellow card) 77'	Report	3' Gary DePalma; 45' Paul Dougherty; 54' John Jones; (yellow card) 64' Henry Gutierrez

Blackbaud Stadium, Charleston, South Carolina
Attendance: 2,606

=== San Diego vs Atlanta ===
September 19, 2001
10:00 PM (EDT)

San Diego Flash (CA)	2–0	Atlanta Silverbacks (GA)
Brian O'Connor (yellow card) 43'; Thiago Martins 63', 72'	Report	(yellow card) 5' Shaun McSkimming; (yellow card) 36' Ian Checcio; (yellow card) 54' Randy Merkel; (yellow card) 74' Sean Michael Callahan

San Diego Mesa College, San Diego, California
Attendance: 370
Referee: Richard Heron (USA)

September 23, 2001
5:30 PM (EDT)

Atlanta Silverbacks (GA)	2–2	San Diego Flash (CA)
Danny Care (yellow card) 32'; Sean Finn 45', (yellow card) 60'; Ryan Walker 90'	Report	42' Chugger Adair; 66', (yellow card) 73' Thiago Martins

DeKalb Memorial Stadium, Clarkston, Georgia
Attendance: 722

=== Portland vs Charlotte ===
September 20, 2001
10:35 PM (EDT)

Portland Timbers (OR)	2–0	Charlotte Eagles (NC)
Darin Lewis 10'; Mark Baena 19'; Neil Ryan (yellow card) 26'; Darren Sawatzky (yellow card) 43'; Michael O'Neill (yellow card) 63'	Report	(yellow card) 32' Jose Correa; (yellow card) 73' Nate Watkins

PGE Park, Portland, Oregon
Attendance: 4,771

September 22, 2001
7:30 PM (EDT)

Charlotte Eagles (NC)	2–3	Portland Timbers (OR)
Jacob Coggins 16'; Joey Johnson 19'	Report	23' Michael O'Neill; 82' Scott Benedetti; 85' Greg Howes

Providence High School, Charlotte, North Carolina
Attendance: 2,141

=== Milwaukee vs Nashville ===
September 19, 2001
7:00 PM (CDT)

Nashville Metros (TN)	2–3	Milwaukee Rampage (WI)
Chris Morman (yellow card) 20' (yellow-red card) 73'; Brandon Wright (yellow card) 72'; Jakob Fenger 82'; Jaymi Bailey 90'	Report	(yellow card) 13' Judah Cooks; 30', 61' Steve Butcher; (yellow card) 77' David Hayes; (red card) 77' Jason Russell; 83' Igor Soso; (yellow card) 90' Dennis Fadeski

Ezell Park, Nashville, Tennessee
Attendance: 810
Referee: Ali Saheli (USA)

September 22, 2001
3:00 PM (CDT)

Milwaukee Rampage (WI)	0–1 (OT)	Nashville Metros (TN)
Matt Bobo (yellow card) 28'; Philippe Godoy (yellow card) 72'; Destin Makumbu (yellow card) 93'; Josh Provan (yellow card) 98'; Judah Cooks (yellow card) 99'	Report	(yellow card) 27' Jeff Dominguez; (yellow card) 84' Jakob Fenger; (yellow card) 93' Andreas Maier; 90' Jeff Houser; (yellow card) 98' Jeff Houser
Penalties
Steve Bernal (penalty missed); Igor Soso (penalty scored); David Hayes (penalty scored); Steve Butcher (penalty scored); Mike Slivinski (penalty scored)	4–2	(penalty missed) Dominic Schell; (penalty scored) Jakob Fenger; (penalty scored) Andreas Maier; (penalty missed) Jeff Houser

Milwaukee County Sports Complex, Milwaukee, Wisconsin
Attendance: 2,152

== Quarterfinals ==
=== Milwaukee vs Richmond ===
September 28, 2001
7:00 PM (CDT)

Milwaukee Rampage (WI)	2–2	Richmond Kickers (VA)
Alen Soso (yellow card) 10' (yellow-red card) 82'; Philippe Godoy (yellow card) 18'; Matt Bobo (yellow card) 43'; Judah Cooks (yellow card) 45'; Dennis Fadeski (yellow card) 66'; Digital Takawira 73'	Report	17', (yellow card) 26' Josh Henderson; (yellow card) 44' Mike Burke; (yellow card) 63', (goal) 74' Kevin Knight; (yellow card) 90' Chris Brown

Milwaukee County Sports Complex, Milwaukee, Wisconsin
Attendance: 1,318
Referee: Michael Kennedy (USA)

September 30, 2001
5:00 PM (CDT)

Richmond Kickers (VA)	1–2 (OT)	Milwaukee Rampage (WI)
Peter Luzak (yellow card) 68'; Rob Ukrop (yellow card) 88'; Josh Henderson 90' (pen.)	Report	35' Jim Curtin; 93' Igor Soso

Richmond City Stadium, Richmond, Virginia
Attendance: 4,107
Referee: Robert Mann (USA)

=== Hershey vs Portland ===
September 27, 2001
5:00 PM (CDT)

Portland Timbers (OR)	0–2	Hershey Wildcats (PA)
Gavin Wilkinson (yellow card) 19'; Mark Baena (yellow card) 43'; Michael O'Neill (yellow card) 86'	Report	(yellow card) 23' Nigel Henry; (yellow card) 49' Mike Feniger; (yellow card) 59' Chris Marinos; (red card) 62' Chad Evans; 71' Doug Watson; 85' Fred DeGand

PGE Park, Portland, Oregon
Attendance: 4,894

September 29, 2001

Hershey Wildcats (PA)	1–0	Portland Timbers (OR)
Mike Feniger 28'

Hersheypark Stadium, Hershey, Pennsylvania
Attendance: 1,048

=== Vancouver vs San Diego ===
September 26, 2001

San Diego Flash (CA)	2–0	Vancouver Whitecaps (BC)
Hugo Alcaraz-Cuellar 67'; Emmanuel Ayim 84'	Report

Douglas Stadium, San Diego, California
Attendance: 468

September 29, 2001
7:30 PM (PDT)

Vancouver Whitecaps (BC)	4–1	San Diego Flash (CA)
Darren Tilley 6'; John Sulentic 17', 90'; Steve Kindel 42'	Report	35' Chugger Adair

Swangard Stadium, Burnaby, British Columbia
Attendance: 6,782

=== Rochester vs Pittsburgh ===
September 26, 2001

Pittsburgh Riverhounds (PA)	2–1	Rochester Rhinos (NY)
Welton Melo 62'; John Jones 81'	Report	25' (pen.) Stoian Mladenov

Bethel Park Stadium, Pittsburgh, Pennsylvania
Attendance: 1,073

September 29, 2001

Rochester Rhinos (NY)	3–0	Pittsburgh Riverhounds (PA)
Martin Nash 30'; Neathan Gibson 53'; Jimmy Tanner 90'

Frontier Field, Rochester, New York
Attendance: 8,102
Referee: Robert Mann (USA)

== Semifinals ==
=== Semifinal 1 ===
October 4, 2001

Milwaukee Rampage (WI)	2–3	Rochester Rhinos (NY)
Philippe Godoy 24'; Matt Bobo 61'; Jim Curtin (red card) 78'	Report	2' Lenin Steenkamp; 15' Nate Daligcon; (yellow card) 61' Fuseini Dauda; (yellow card) 72' Kirk Wilson; 76' Neathan Gibson; (yellow card) 78' Scott Vallow; (yellow card) 83' Tommy Tanner

Milwaukee County Sports Complex, Franklin, Wisconsin
Attendance: 721

October 6, 2001
6:36 PM (CST)

Rochester Rhinos (NY)	1–0	Milwaukee Rampage (WI)
Scott Schweitzer (yellow card) 16'; Neathan Gibson 41'; Mike Kirmse (yellow card) 90'	Report	(yellow card) 38' Igor Soso; (yellow card) 45' Judah Cooks; (yellow card) 45' Philippe Godoy; (yellow card) 81' Brian Doherty

Frontier Field, Rochester, New York
Attendance: 6,817

=== Semifinal 2 ===
October 3, 2001
7:30 PM (PDT)

Vancouver Whitecaps (BC)	0–4	Hershey Wildcats (PA)
	Report	21', 39' Kyle Swords; 85' Zé Roberto; 90' Doug Miller

Swangard Stadium, Burnaby, British Columbia
Attendance: 6,685

October 6, 2001

Hershey Wildcats (PA)	0–1	Vancouver Whitecaps (BC)
	Report	66' Darren Tilley

Hersheypark Stadium, Hershey, Pennsylvania
Attendance: 786

== Final ==
October 13, 2001

Rochester Raging Rhinos (NY)	2–0	Hershey Wildcats (PA)
Martin Nash (yellow card) 38'; Carlos Zavala (yellow card) 38'; Stoian Mladenov 63', 87'	Report

Frontier Field, Rochester, New York
Attendance: 13,692
Referee: Eric Simmons (USA)

== Points leaders ==
Rank	Scorer	Club	GP	Goals	Assists	Points
1	(United States) Paul Conway	Charleston Battery	25	22	3	47
2	(United States) Dustin Swinehart	Charlotte Eagles	23	18	3	39
3	(Denmark) Jakob Fenger	Nashville Metros	24	14	6	34
4	(United States) Jeff Houser	Nashville Metros	24	14	5	33
5	(Zimbabwe) Digital Takawira	Milwaukee Rampage	20	13	4	30
6	(Trinidad and Tobago) Kevin Jeffrey	Richmond Kickers	24	11	7	29
6	(United States) Leighton O'Brien	Seattle Sounders	24	11	7	29
6	(United States) Mark Baena	Portland Timbers	24	13	3	29
9	(Democratic Republic of the Congo) Ignace Moleka	Atlanta Silverbacks	19	12	1	25
9	(Mexico) Luis Macias	El Paso Patriots	23	12	1	25
9	(United States) Chugger Adair	San Diego Flash	22	10	5	25
9	(Canada) Jason Jordan	Vancouver Whitecaps	18	9	7	25
9	(Brazil) Rodrigo Costa	Indiana Blast	21	11	3	25
14	(United States) Mark Rowland	El Paso Patriots	26	7	10	24
15	(United States) Josh Henderson	Richmond Kickers	21	10	3	23

== Honors ==
=== Annual awards ===
- Most Valuable Player: (United States) Paul Conway
- Leading Goal Scorer: (United States) Paul Conway
- Goalkeeper of the Year: (United States) Jon Busch
- Defender of the Year: (Trinidad and Tobago) Rick Titus
- Rookie of the Year: (Canada) Robbie Aristodemo
- Coach of the Year: (Canada) Dale Mitchell
- First Team All A-League
  - Goalkeeper: (United States) Jon Busch
  - Defenders: (United States) Scott Schweitzer, (Trinidad and Tobago) Rick Titus, (Haiti) Gilbert Jean-Baptiste
  - Midfielders: (France) Philippe Godoy, (Bulgaria) Stoian Mladenov, (United States) Leighton O'Brien, (United States) Temoc Suarez
  - Forwards: (United States) Paul Conway, (Trinidad and Tobago) Kevin Jeffrey, (United States) Dustin Swinehart
- Second Team All A-League
  - Goalkeeper: (United States) Matt Napoleon
  - Defenders: (England) James Wall, (Trinidad and Tobago) Brent Sancho, (United States) Jason Annicchero
  - Midfielders: (United States) John Ball, (South Africa) Lenin Steenkamp, (United States) Kevin Knight, (Canada) Steve Kindel
  - Forwards: (Denmark) Jakob Fenger, (Zimbabwe) Digital Takawira, (Brazil) Rodrigo Costa
