= 2000 USL A-League =

USL A-League -2000 Season-
- Season: 2000
- Teams: 25
- Champions: Rochester Rhinos (2nd Title)
- Premiers: Minnesota Thunder (1st Title)
- Matches: 350
- Goals: 1,138 (3.25 per match)
- Best Player: (Zimbabwe) Digital Takawira, Milwaukee Rampage
- Top goalscorer: (United States) Paul Conway, Charleston Battery, (United States) Greg Howes, Seattle Sounders, (Liberia) Johnny Menyongar, Minnesota Thunder (17 goals each)
- Best goalkeeper: (United States) Scott Vallow, Rochester Raging Rhinos

The 2000 USL A-League was an American Division II league run by the United Soccer League during the summer of 2000.

== League standings ==
=== Eastern Conference ===
==== Northeast Division ====
Pos	Team	Pld	W	L	D	GF	GA	GD	BP	Pts
1	Long Island Rough Riders	28	16	9	3	54	36	+18	9	76
2	Rochester Raging Rhinos	28	17	9	2	42	25	+17	5	75
3	Toronto Lynx	28	13	11	4	35	30	+5	3	59
4	Montreal Impact	28	12	13	3	34	41	−7	3	54
5	Boston Bulldogs	28	9	16	3	32	41	−9	3	42
6	Connecticut Wolves	28	1	19	8	22	57	−35	1	13

==== Atlantic Division ====
Pos	Team	Pld	W	L	D	GF	GA	GD	BP	Pts
1	Charleston Battery	28	18	8	2	59	36	+23	13	87
2	Richmond Kickers	28	20	7	1	42	25	+17	3	84
3	Hershey Wildcats	28	15	10	3	49	30	+19	7	70
4	Hampton Roads Mariners	28	14	12	2	44	38	+6	4	62
5	Raleigh Capital Express	28	12	12	4	48	52	−4	6	58
6	Atlanta Silverbacks	28	11	14	3	51	42	+9	8	55
7	Pittsburgh Riverhounds	28	10	14	4	41	43	−2	5	49

=== Western Conference ===
==== Central Division ====
Pos	Team	Pld	W	L	D	GF	GA	GD	BP	Pts
1	Minnesota Thunder	28	20	4	4	74	30	+44	15	99
2	Milwaukee Rampage	28	18	9	1	69	47	+22	16	89
3	Indiana Blast	28	9	15	4	40	57	−17	5	45
4	MLS Project 40	28	8	19	1	35	60	−25	3	36
5	Tennessee Rhythm	28	6	22	0	36	103	−67	1	25
6	Cincinnati Riverhawks	28	2	23	3	25	80	−55	2	13

==== Pacific Division ====
Pos	Team	Pld	W	L	D	GF	GA	GD	BP	Pts
1	Seattle Sounders	28	18	7	3	56	38	+18	10	85
2	San Diego Flash	28	16	9	3	54	32	+22	8	75
3	Vancouver 86ers	28	14	11	3	62	41	+21	11	70
4	El Paso Patriots	28	12	14	2	48	50	−2	7	57
5	Bay Area Seals	28	12	13	3	42	53	−11	5	56
6	Orange County Waves	28	12	15	1	44	52	−8	6	55

== Conference Quarterfinals ==
=== Eastern Conference ===
September 8, 2000
7:30 PM (EST)

Long Island Rough Riders (NY)	1–2	Toronto Lynx (ON)
Dahir Mohammed 78'	Report	5' Brian Ashton; 43' Juan Pablo Arango

Mitchel Athletic Complex, Uniondale, New York
Attendance: 758

September 9, 2000
7:30 PM (EST)

Charleston Battery (SC)	1–0	Raleigh Capital Express (NC)
Paul Conway 24'; Gilbert Jean-Baptiste (yellow card)	Report	(yellow card) Ihor Dotsenko

Blackbaud Stadium, Charleston, South Carolina
Attendance: 3,091

September 9, 2000
7:35 PM (EST)

Rochester Rhinos (NY)	4–2	Hershey Wildcats (PA)
Mali Walton (47:38), (yellow card) 59'; Yari Allnutt (51:28); Dan Stebbins (yellow card) 57', (goal) 85'; Martin Nash (yellow card) 62'; Onandi Lowe (yellow card) 71', (goal) 78'; Scott Schweitzer (red card) 90'	Report	(40:52) Greg Simmonds; (yellow card) 32' Mike Williams; (yellow card) 36' Mike Henning; (yellow card) 59' Ze Roberto; 90' Timothy Leonard

Frontier Field, Rochester, New York
Attendance: 10,456

September 9, 2000

Richmond Kickers (VA)	2–1 (OT)	Hampton Roads Mariners (VA)
Paul Lekics 90'; Rob Ukrop 113'		41' Jakob Fenger

UR Stadium, Richmond, Virginia
Attendance: 3,927

=== Western Conference ===
September 9, 2000
7:30 PM EST

Milwaukee Rampage (WI)	3–2	El Paso Patriots (TX)
Digital Takawira 5', 94'; Igor Soso 85'		41' Mark Rowland; 63' Kirk Wilson

Uihlein Soccer Park, Milwaukee, Wisconsin
Attendance: 3,122

September 9, 2000
7:35 PM (CDT)

Minnesota Thunder (MN)	7–0	Indiana Blast (IN)
Brian Winters 2', 61'; Chugger Adair 27'; Morgan Zeba 47', 63'; Johnny Menyongar 53'; Paul Schneider 80'	Report

National Sports Center, Blaine, Minnesota
Attendance: 2,957
Referee: Kelly Ross (USA)

September 9, 2000

Seattle Sounders (WA)	2–1	Bay Area Seals (CA)
Craig Waibel 26', (yellow card) 57'; Viet Nguyen 45'; Scott Jenkins (yellow card) 48'; Tim Steidten (yellow card) 79'	Report	5' Marquis White; (yellow card) 44' Jeremy Sweet; (yellow card) 55' Kevin Jeffrey

Memorial Stadium, Seattle, Washington
Attendance: 3,239
Referee: Cory Dean (USA)

September 12, 1998
7:35 PM (PDT)

San Diego Flash (CA)	1–1 (a.e.t.)	Vancouver 86ers (BC)
Anthony Farace (yellow card) 21'; Carlos Farias 53'; Leighton O'Brien (yellow card) 77'; Raul Calderon (yellow card) 103'	Report	(yellow card) 2' Chris Franks; (yellow card) 38' Carmen D'Onofrio; 43' Paul Dailly
Penalties
Carlos Farias (penalty scored); Carlos Calderson (penalty scored); Emmanuel Ayim (penalty scored); Jerome Watson (penalty missed); Brian O'Connor (penalty scored)	3–4	(penalty scored) Darren Tilley; (penalty scored) Domenic Mobilio; (penalty scored) Steve Kindel; (penalty scored) Chris Franks; (penalty scored) Rick Titus

Douglas Stadium, San Diego, California
Attendance: 3,877
Referee: Nathan Lacy (USA)

== Conference semifinals ==
=== Eastern semifinal 1 ===
September 15, 2000
7:30 PM (EDT)

Rochester Rhinos (NY)	2–0	Charleston Battery (SC)
Onandi Lowe 8', (yellow card) 42'; Yari Allnutt 10'	Report	(yellow card) 2' Darren Warham; (yellow card) 56' (yellow-red card) 76' Brent Sancho

Frontier Field, Rochester, New York
Attendance: 7,531

September 16, 2000
7:30 PM (EDT)

Charleston Battery (SC)	0–1	Rochester Rhinos (NY)
	Report	28' Dan Stebbins; (yellow card) 82' Scott Vallow

Blackbaud Stadium, Charleston, South Carolina
Attendance: 2,806

The Rochester Rhinos advanced 3–0 on aggregate.

=== Eastern semifinal 2 ===
September 15, 2000
7:30 PM (EDT)

Toronto Lynx (ON)	1–0	Richmond Kickers (VA)
Milan Kojić (yellow card) 32'; Nikola Vignjević 36' (pen.)	Report

Varsity Stadium, Toronto, Ontario
Attendance: 1,989
Referee: Manuel Orellano (Canada)

September 17, 2000
7:00 PM (EDT)

Richmond Kickers (VA)	0–1	Toronto Lynx (ON)
	Report	39' Milan Kojić

City Stadium, Richmond, Virginia
Attendance: 4,027

Toronto Lynx advanced 2–0 on aggregate.

=== Western semifinal 1 ===
September 13, 2000
7:30 PM (PDT)

Vancouver 86ers (BC)	3–0	Minnesota Thunder (MN)
Alfredo Valente 30'; John Sulentic 69', 90'	Report	(red card) 69' John Sylvester; (yellow card) 72' John Coughlin

Swangard Stadium, Burnaby, British Columbia
Attendance: 5,127
Referee: Rene Parra (Canada)

September 16, 2000
7:35 PM (CDT)

Minnesota Thunder (MN)	4–0 (OT)	Vancouver 86ers (BC)
Don Gramenz (yellow card) 30'; Mike Gentile 35'; Chugger Adair 45'; Brian Winters 86'; Morgan Zeba 94'	Report	(yellow card) 13' Darren Tilley; (yellow card) 90' Joe Scigliano; (yellow card) 90' Domenic Mobilio

National Sports Center, Blaine, Minnesota
Attendance: 3,005
Referee: Michael Kennedy (USA)

The Minnesota Thunder advanced 4–3 on aggregate.

=== Western semifinal 2 ===
September 13, 2000
5:30 PM (CDT)

Milwaukee Rampage (WI)	2–1	Seattle Sounders (WA)
Digital Takawira 1'; Jason Willan 33'; Steve Bernal (yellow card) 60'	Report	(yellow card) 20', (goal) 90' Andrew Gregor; (yellow card) 75' Ali John Utush; (yellow card) 90' Craig Tomlinson

Uihlein Soccer Park, Milwaukee, Wisconsin
Attendance: 2,558
Referee: Ricardo Salazar (USA)

September 17, 2000
7:00 PM (PDT)

Seattle Sounders (WA)	1–2	Milwaukee Rampage (WI)
Greg Howes 10'; Ali John Utush (yellow card) 39'; Craig Waibel (yellow card) 57'	Report	34' Yuri Lavrinenko; (yellow card) 54' Todd Dusosky; (yellow card) 82' Jake Provan; 90' Brian Loftin; (yellow card) 90' Dan Popik

Memorial Stadium, Seattle, Washington
Attendance: 1,952
Referee: Kari Seitz (USA)

Milwaukee Rampage advanced 4–2 on aggregate.

== Conference finals ==
=== Eastern Conference ===
September 22, 2000
7:30 PM EST

Toronto Lynx (ON)	1–1	Rochester Rhinos (NY)
Brian Ashton (yellow card) 20'; Francisco Dos Santos 63', (yellow card) 66'	Report	(yellow card) 41' Onandi Lowe; 75' Dan Stebbins

Varsity Stadium, Toronto, Ontario
Attendance: 2,811
Referee: Jerry Proctor (Canada)

September 24, 2000
7:30 PM EST

Rochester Rhinos (NY)	1–0	Toronto Lynx (ON)
Tim Hardy (yellow card) 33'; Craig Demmin 80'	Report	(yellow card) 11' Brian Ashton

Frontier Field, Rochester, New York
Attendance: 8,058

=== Western Conference ===
September 21, 2000
7:30 PM EST

Milwaukee Rampage (WI)	3–4	Minnesota Thunder (MN)
Todd Dusosky 23', (red card) 90'; Yuri Lavrinenko 51'; David Marshall 90'; Jason Willan (red card) 90'; Jon Cantwell (red card) 90'		9', 41' Morgan Zeba; 57' Johnny Menyongar; 64' John Coughlin

Uihlein Soccer Park, Milwaukee, Wisconsin
Attendance: 1,187

September 23, 2000
7:30 PM EST

Minnesota Thunder (MN)	5–0	Milwaukee Rampage (WI)
Johnny Menyongar 15', 89', (yellow card) 67'; Chugger Adair 45', 62'; Stoian Mladenov 74'	Report	(yellow card) 18' Brian Loftin; (yellow card) 51' Nate Houser

National Sports Center, Blaine, Minnesota
Attendance: 3,414
Referee: Terry Vaughan (USA)

== Final ==
September 30, 2000

Rochester Rhinos (NY)	3–1	Minnesota Thunder (MN)
Dan Stebbins (13:55); Carlos Zavala (yellow card) 15'; Yari Allnutt (38:00); Martin Nash (yellow card) 77'; Onandi Lowe (77:10)	Report	(yellow card) 63' John Coughlin; (yellow card) 76' Morgan Zeba (78:12) Chugger Adair; (yellow card) 81' Don Gramenz

Frontier Field, Rochester, New York
Attendance: 14,276
Referee: Ricardo Salazar (USA)

== Points leaders ==
Rank	Scorer	Club	GP	Goals	Assists	Points
1	(Zimbabwe) Digital Takawira	Milwaukee Rampage	21	16	10	42
1	(United States) Paul Conway	Charleston Battery	26	17	8	42
3	(United States) Greg Howes	Seattle Sounders	27	17	7	41
3	(United States) Darren Sawatzky	Seattle Sounders	28	16	9	41
5	(Liberia) Johnny Menyongar	Minnesota Thunder	28	17	3	39
6	(Honduras) Saul Martínez	Hampton Road Mariners	26	16	5	37
6	(Jamaica) Gregory Simmonds	Hershey Wildcats	25	16	5	37
8	(Canada) Dwayne DeRosario	Richmond Kickers	23	15	5	35
9	(United States) Paul Schneider	Minnesota Thunder	23	15	4	34
10	(Jamaica) Patrick Beech	Atlanta Silverbacks	22	14	5	33
10	(Democratic Republic of the Congo) Ignace Moleka	Atlanta Silverbacks	28	14	5	33
12	(Ukraine) Ihor Dotsenko	Raleigh Capital Express	28	15	2	32
12	(England) Darren Tilley	Vancouver 86ers	13	12	6	30
14	(Republic of Ireland) Seamus Donnelly	Hampton Roads Mariners	28	14	1	29
14	(United States) Jason Boyce	Orange County Zodiac	24	11	7	29
15	(United States) Jamel Mitchell	Hershey Wildcats	28	13	2	28
16	(Trinidad and Tobago) Kevin Jeffrey	Bay Area Seals	24	12	3	27
16	(United States) Mac Cozier	Charleston Battery	24	11	5	27
18	(United States) Edson Buddle	Long Island Rough Riders	26	11	4	26
18	(Saint Lucia) David Flavius	Pittsburgh Riverhounds	25	11	4	26

== Honors ==
- MVP: (Zimbabwe) Digital Takawira
- Goals Leaders (tied): (United States) Paul Conway, (United States) Greg Howes, (Liberia) Johnny Menyongar
- Goalkeeper of the Year: (United States) Scott Vallow
- Defender of the Year: (United States) Scott Cannon
- Rookie of the Year: (United States) Greg Howes
- Coach of the Year: (United States) Neil Megson
- First Team All A-League
  - Goalkeeper: (United States) Scott Vallow
  - Defenders: (United States) Chris Fox, (Trinidad and Tobago) Craig Demmin, (United States) Scott Cannon, (United States) Scott Schweitzer
  - Midfielders: (United States) Brian Loftin, (United States) Yari Allnutt, (Bulgaria) Stoian Mladenov
  - Forwards: (United States) Paul Conway, (United States) Darren Sawatzky, (Zimbabwe) Digital Takawira
- Second Team All A-League
  - Goalkeeper: (Canada) Theo Zagar
  - Defenders: (Haiti) Gilbert Jean-Baptiste, (Canada) Adrian Serioux, (England) David Banks, (Trinidad and Tobago) Rick Titus
  - Midfielders: (South Africa) Lenin Steenkamp, (Republic of Ireland) Gerry Lucey, (Canada) Martin Nash
  - Forwards: (Canada) Dwayne DeRosario, (Liberia) Johnny Menyongar, (United States) Greg Howes
