= 2001 U.S. Open Cup =

2001 Lamar Hunt U.S. Open Cup
Tournament details
- Country: United States

Final positions
- Champions: Los Angeles Galaxy (1st title)
- Runners-up: New England Revolution

Tournament statistics
- Top goal scorer(s): Abdul Thompson Conteh (5 goals)

The 2001 Lamar Hunt U.S. Open Cup ran from June through October 2001, open to all soccer teams in the United States.

The Los Angeles Galaxy won the tournament with a 2–1 victory over the New England Revolution in extra time in the final at Titan Stadium on the campus of Cal State-Fullerton.

Four MLS squads were upset in the second round. However, one team that held on was the San Jose Earthquakes, who won 7–6 on penalties in the third round against the Milwaukee Rampage, then in the quarterfinals lost to their California rival Los Angeles, but not before an exciting game that in the end saw penalties from all ten position players. LA won 10–9 on PKs after a 1–1 draw. The Seattle Sounders Select had the best performance by a PDL team, defeating the Dallas Burn in extra time in the second round, then lost to the eventual champion Los Angeles 3–1. The farthest run by a lower-division team was accomplished by the Pittsburgh Riverhounds, who lost to the Chicago Fire in the quarterfinals in extra time.

== Open Cup bracket ==
Home teams listed on top of bracket

Second Round
A-L	Milwaukee Rampage	2
D3	Utah Blitzz	0
PDL	Central Coast Roadrunners	0
MLS	San Jose Earthquakes	6
MLS	Los Angeles Galaxy	5
A-L	Nashville Metros	0
MLS	Dallas Burn	2
PDL	Sounders Select (ASDET)	3
MLS	Kansas City Wizards	4
A-L	Seattle Sounders	0
MLS	Chicago Fire	3
A-L	San Diego Flash	0
A-L	El Paso Patriots	4
D3	Chico Rooks	3
A-L	Pittsburgh Riverhounds	2
MLS	Colorado Rapids	0
MLS	New England Revolution	7
PDL	Mid Michigan Bucks	1
A-L	Charleston Battery	4
MLS	MetroStars	1
MLS	Columbus Crew	5
A-L	Carolina Dynamo	1
MLS	Miami Fusion	4
USASA	Uruguay SC	0
MLS	D.C. United	8
D3	New Jersey Stallions	0
A-L	Rochester Rhinos	0
A-L	Hershey Wildcats	1
A-L	Richmond Kickers	7
D3	Reading Rage	2
A-L	Connecticut Wolves	3
MLS	Tampa Bay Mutiny	2

Third Round
A-L	Milwaukee Rampage	0 (6)
MLS	San Jose Earthquakes (ASDET, PSO)	0 (7)
MLS	Los Angeles Galaxy	3
PDL	Sounders Select	1
MLS	Kansas City Wizards	0
MLS	Chicago Fire	1
A-L	El Paso Patriots	1
A-L	Pittsburgh Riverhounds	2
MLS	New England Revolution	2
A-L	Charleston Battery	1
MLS	Columbus Crew	2
MLS	Miami Fusion	1
MLS	D.C. United	3
A-L	Hershey Wildcats	0
A-L	Richmond Kickers	2
A-L	Connecticut Wolves	1

Quarterfinals
MLS	San Jose Earthquakes	1 (9)
MLS	Los Angeles Galaxy (ASDET, PSO)	1 (10)
MLS	Chicago Fire (ASDET)	3
A-L	Pittsburgh Riverhounds	2
MLS	New England Revolution	2
MLS	Columbus Crew	1
MLS	D.C. United	2
A-L	Richmond Kickers	1

Semifinals
MLS	Los Angeles Galaxy (ASDET)	1
MLS	Chicago Fire	0
MLS	New England Revolution	2
MLS	D.C. United	0

Finals
MLS	Los Angeles Galaxy (ASDET)	2
MLS	New England Revolution	1

== Schedule ==
Note: Scorelines use the standard U.S. convention of placing the home team on the right-hand side of box scores.

=== First round ===
Four PDL and four USASA teams start.

June 9, 2001	Olympia Stamford (USASA)	1–4	Seattle Sounders Select (PDL)	East Renton Highlands, Washington
	Keith Segovia 41'	(Report)	Scott Burcar 35'; Greg Foisie 59', 63'; Zach Kingsley 88'	Stadium: Liberty Senior High School; Attendance: 70; Referee: Kevin Boisen (USA)

June 9, 2001	Mexico SC (USASA)	1–1 (asdet) (4–5 pen)	Central Coast Roadrunners (PDL)	San Luis Obispo, California
	n/a	(Report)	Evan Clark 50'	Stadium: Mustang Stadium; Attendance: -- Referee: Alcides Hernandez (USA)

June 13, 2001	Uruguay SC (USASA)	3–2	Miami Strike Force (PDL)	Miami Beach, Florida
	Julio Barrios 10'; Sebastián Zurita 60', 65'	(Report)	Matais Asorey 32'; Nasser Khalil 73'	Stadium: Flamingo Park; Attendance: -- Referee: Gregory Watson (USA)

June 13, 2001	Chaldean Arsenal (USASA)	0–3	Mid Michigan Bucks (PDL)	Saginaw Township, Michigan
		(Report)	Justin Detter 20'; Benjamin Djeukeng 25'; Scott Deopere 88'	Stadium: White Pine Stadium; Attendance: 605; Referee: John Paul Spicer (USA)

=== Second round ===
Twelve MLS, Eleven A-League, and Five D3 Pro League teams enter.

June 26, 2001	Tampa Bay Mutiny (MLS)	2–3	Connecticut Wolves (A-League)	New Britain, Connecticut
	Devin Barclay 55'; Mamadou Diallo 89'	(Report)	Mobi Oparaku 50'; Winston Griffiths 58'; Irasto Knights 86'	Stadium: Veterans Memorial Stadium; Attendance: 4,362; Referee: Erich Simmons (USA)

June 27, 2001	Colorado Rapids (MLS)	0–2	Pittsburgh Riverhounds (A-League)	Bethel Park, Pennsylvania
		(Report)	Alfredo Ulloa 54'; Phil Karn 90'	Stadium: Bethel Park Stadium; Attendance: 1,660; Referee: JR Purdue (USA)

June 27, 2001	Utah Blitzz (D3 Pro)	0–2	Milwaukee Rampage (A-League)	Franklin, Wisconsin
		(Report)	Igor Soso 58'; David Hayes 62'	Stadium: Milwaukee Sports Complex; Attendance: 1,828; Referee: Kelly Ross (USA)

June 27, 2001	Uruguay SC (USASA)	0–4	Miami Fusion (MLS)	Fort Lauderdale, Florida
		(Report)	Diego Serna 18'; Chris Henderson 24'; Greg Simmonds 32'; Lazo Alavanja 43'	Stadium: Lockhart Stadium; Attendance: -- Referee: Kermit Quisenberry (USA)

June 27, 2001	San Diego Flash (A-League)	0–3	Chicago Fire (MLS)	Franklin, Wisconsin
		(Report)	Eric Wynalda 37', 53'; Jamar Beasley 73'	Stadium: Milwaukee Sports Complex; Attendance: 3,409; Referee: Ricardo Salazar (USA)

June 27, 2001	Seattle Sounders (A-League)	0–4	Kansas City Wizards (MLS)	Overland Park, Kansas
		(Report)	Ryan Edwards 20' (og); Mark Santel 58'; Matt McKeon 60'; Mike Burns 90'	Stadium: Blue Valley Sports Complex; Attendance: 1,911; Referee: Michael Kennedy (USA)

June 27, 2001	Reading Rage (D3 Pro)	2–7	Richmond Kickers (A-League)	Richmond, Virginia
	Roger Kennedy 39'; Bob Henes 83'	(Report)	Kevin Alvero 26', 37'; Kevin Jeffrey 28', 49'; Kevin Knight 33'; Michael Burke 59'; Kwaku Abu-Gyamfi 63'	Stadium: Richmond City Stadium; Attendance: 1,015; Referee: Mike Stutt (USA)

June 27, 2001	Seattle Sounders Select (PDL)	3–2 (asdet)	Dallas Burn (MLS)	Duncanville, Texas
	Greg Foisie 45'; Zach Kingsley 69'; Kurt Ness 97'	(Report)	Aleksey Korol 65'; Ariel Graziani 78'	Stadium: Old Panther Field; Attendance: 554; Referee: Missail Tsapos (USA)

June 27, 2001	MetroStars (MLS)	1–4	Charleston Battery (A-League)	Charleston, South Carolina
	Daniel Hernández 90'	(Report)	Gilbert Jean-Baptiste 47'; Paul Conway 70'; Brian Piesner 77'; Mac Cozier 79'	Stadium: Blackbaud Stadium; Attendance: 4,097; Referee: Peter Kokolski (USA)

June 27, 2001	Chico Rooks (D3 Pro)	3–4	El Paso Patriots (A-League)	El Paso, Texas
	Arturo Barragan 54', 77'; German Campos 67'	(Report)	Mark Rowland 28'; Luis Macias 48', 52'; Esmundo Rodriguez 65'	Stadium: Soccorro Stadium; Attendance: 1,380; Referee: Richard Heron (USA)

June 27, 2001	Mid Michigan Bucks (PDL)	1–7	New England Revolution (MLS)	Foxboro, Massachusetts
	Paul Snape 12'	(Report)	Shaker Asad 7'; Matt Okoh 20', 76'; Wolde Harris 36', 44'; William Sunsing 53' (pen); Cate 82'	Stadium: Foxboro Stadium; Attendance: 947; Referee: Gus St. Silva (USA)

June 27, 2001	San Jose Earthquakes (MLS)	6–0	Central Coast Roadrunners (PDL)	Arroyo Grande, California
	Dwayne De Rosario 52'; Scott Bower 57', 68'; Junior Agogo 70'; Ronald Cerritos 85'; Manny Lagos 87'	(Report)		Stadium: Doug Hitchen Stadium; Attendance: 3,276; Referee: Kari Seitz (USA)

June 27, 2001	Carolina Dynamo (D3 Pro)	1–5	Columbus Crew (MLS)	Columbus, Ohio
	Mario Benjamin 82'	(Report)	Dante Washington 33', 44'; Jeff Cunningham 52', 88'; John Wilmar Pérez 79'	Stadium: Columbus Crew Stadium; Attendance: 9,339; Referee: Elias Bazakos (USA)

June 27, 2001	Nashville Metros (A-League)	0–5	Los Angeles Galaxy (MLS)	Fullerton, California
		(Report)	Mario Quijano 24'; Peter Vagenas 38' (pen); Sasha Victorine 56'; Simon Elliott 86' (pen), 90'	Stadium: Titan Stadium; Attendance: 2,314; Referee: Brian Hall (USA)

June 27, 2001	New Jersey Stallions (D3 Pro)	0–8	D.C. United (MLS)	Germantown, Maryland
		(Report)	Chris Albright 20'; Abdul Thompson Conteh 28', 39', 49'; Eddie Pope 38'; Marco Etcheverry 45'; Ian Hennessy 56' (og); Jose Alegria 74'	Stadium: Maryland SoccerPlex; Attendance: 3,200; Referee: Thomas Perry (USA)

July 2, 2001	Hershey Wildcats (A-League)	1–0	Rochester Raging Rhinos (A-League)	Rochester, New York
	Steve Klein 71'	(Report)		Stadium: Frontier Field; Attendance: 9,245; Referee: Ricardo Valenzuela (USA)

=== Third round ===
July 11, 2001	Pittsburgh Riverhounds (A-League)	2–1	El Paso Patriots (A-League)	El Paso, Texas
	David Flavius 1'; Henry Gutierrez 48' (pen)	(Report)	Luis Macias 86'	Stadium: Soccorro Stadium; Attendance: -- Referee: Kari Seitz (USA)

July 11, 2001	Chicago Fire (MLS)	1–0	Kansas City Wizards (MLS)	Overland Park, Kansas
	Hristo Stoichkov 90'	(Report)		Stadium: Blue Valley Sports Complex; Attendance: 2,017; Referee: Kevin Terry (USA)

July 11, 2001	San Jose Earthquakes (MLS)	0–0 (asdet) (7–6 p)	Milwaukee Rampage (A-League)	Franklin, Wisconsin
		(Report)		Stadium: Milwaukee Sports Complex; Attendance: 3,276; Referee: Rich Grady (USA)
	Penalties
	Ramiro Corrales (penalty missed); Landon Donovan (penalty scored); Manny Lagos (penalty scored); Junior Agogo (penalty scored); Ronnie Ekelund (penalty scored); Zak Ibsen (penalty scored); Troy Dayak (penalty scored); Scott Bower (penalty scored)		Igor Soso (penalty scored); David Hayes (penalty scored); Steve Bernal (penalty scored); Khary Stockton (penalty missed); Peter Henning (penalty scored); Chad Prince (penalty scored); Phillippe Godoy (penalty scored); Dennis Fideski (penalty missed)

July 11, 2001	Seattle Sounders Select (PDL)	1–3	Los Angeles Galaxy (MLS)	Fullerton, California
	Sy Reeves 58'	(Report)	Craig Waibel 60'; Alexi Lalas 63'; Isaias Bardales 81'	Stadium: Titan Stadium; Attendance: 2,450; Referee: Kevin Stott (USA)

July 11, 2001	Charleston Battery (A-League)	1–2	New England Revolution (MLS)	Foxboro, Massachusetts
	Paul Conway 25' (pen)	(Report)	Shaker Asad 19'; Johnny Torres 66'	Stadium: Foxboro Stadium; Attendance: 1,207; Referee: Robert Mann (USA)

July 11, 2001	Miami Fusion (MLS)	1–2	Columbus Crew (MLS)	Columbus, Ohio
	Jim Rooney 24'	(Report)	Jeff Cunningham 52', 89'	Stadium: Columbus Crew Stadium; Attendance: 4,316; Referee: Noel Kenny (USA)

July 11, 2001	Connecticut Wolves (A-League)	1–2	Richmond Kickers (A-League)	Richmond, Virginia
	Winston Griffiths 38'	(Report)	Marco Ferruzzi 7'; Kevin Jeffrey 89'	Stadium: Richmond City Stadium; Attendance: 5,288; Referee: Andrew Barnes (USA)

July 11, 2001	Hershey Wildcats (A-League)	0–3	D.C. United (MLS)	Richmond, Virginia
		(Report)	Chris Albright 35'; Jaime Moreno 70'; Santino Quaranta 74'	Stadium: Richmond City Stadium; Attendance: 5,288; Referee: Paul Tamberino (USA)

=== Quarterfinals ===
July 24, 2001	Richmond Kickers (A-League)	1–2	D.C. United (MLS)	Washington, D.C.
	Kevin Jeffrey 88'	(Report)	Abdul Thompson Conteh 59', 86'	Stadium: RFK Stadium; Attendance: 8,439; Referee: Terry Vaughn (USA)

July 24, 2001	Columbus Crew (MLS)	1–2	New England Revolution (MLS)	Foxboro, Massachusetts
	John Wilmar Perez 85'	(Report)	Cate 50' (pen); William Sunsing 72'	Stadium: Foxboro Stadium; Attendance: 5,695; Referee: Ricardo Salazar (USA)

July 24, 2001	Pittsburgh Riverhounds (A-League)	2–3 (asdet)	Chicago Fire (MLS)	Wheaton, Illinois
	Welton 9'; Paul Dougherty 70'	(Report)	Hristo Stoitchkov 15' (pen); Dema Kovalenko 49'; Amos Magee 111'	Stadium: McCully Field; Attendance: 2,500; Referee: Andrew Barnes (USA)

July 24, 2001	Los Angeles Galaxy (MLS)	1–1 (asdet) (10–9 p)	San Jose Earthquakes (MLS)	San Francisco, California
	Simon Elliott 73'	(Report)	Junior Agogo 81'	Stadium: Negoesco Stadium; Attendance: 1,881; Referee: Michael Kennedy (USA)
	Penalties
	Greg Vanney (penalty scored); Peter Vagenas (penalty scored); Simon Elliott (penalty scored); Mauricio Cienfuegos (penalty scored); Ezra Hendrickson (penalty scored); Craig Waibel (penalty scored); Paul Caligiuri (penalty scored); Cobi Jones (penalty scored); Isaias Bardales (penalty scored); Danny Califf (penalty scored)		Jeff Agoos (penalty scored); Manny Lagos (penalty scored); Ramiro Corrales (penalty scored); Ronald Cerritos (penalty scored); Dwayne De Rosario (penalty scored); Junior Agogo (penalty scored); Zak Ibsen (penalty scored); Ian Russell (penalty scored); Jimmy Conrad (penalty scored); Wade Barrett (penalty missed)

=== Semifinals ===
August 22, 2001	Chicago Fire (MLS)	0–1 (asdet)	Los Angeles Galaxy (MLS)	Fullerton, California
		(Report)	Alexi Lalas 94'	Stadium: Titan Stadium; Attendance: 6,871; Referee: Ricardo Valenzuela (USA)

August 22, 2001	D.C. United (MLS)	0–2	New England Revolution (MLS)	Foxboro, Massachusetts
		(Report)	Andy Williams 9', 40'	Stadium: Foxboro Stadium; Attendance: 7,128; Referee: Brian Hall (USA)

=== Final ===
October 27, 2001

New England Revolution (MLS)	1–2 (asdet)	Los Angeles Galaxy (MLS)
Wolde Harris 30'	(Report)	Ezra Hendrickson 70'; Danny Califf 92'

Titan Stadium
Fullerton, California
Attendance: 4,195
Referee: Paul Tamberino (USA)

== Top scorers ==
Position	Player	Club	Goals
1	Abdul Thompson Conteh	D.C. United	5
2	Jeff Cunningham	Columbus Crew	4
	Kevin Jeffrey	Richmond Kickers	4
4	Luis Macias	El Paso Patriots	3
	Simon Elliott	Los Angeles Galaxy	3
	Wolde Harris	New England Revolution	3
	Greg Foisie	Seattle Sounders Select	3

== See also ==
- United States Soccer Federation
- Lamar Hunt U.S. Open Cup
- Major League Soccer
- United Soccer Leagues
- USASA
- National Premier Soccer League
- 2001 National Amateur Cup
