= Matt Ford =

Matt Ford may refer to:

- Matt Ford (baseball), American baseball pitcher
- Matt Ford (cricketer), Irish cricketer
- Matt Ford (golfer) (born 1978), English golfer
- Matt Ford (lighting designer), American lighting designer
- Matthew Ford (ice hockey) (born 1984), American professional ice hockey forward
- Matthew Ford (footballer) (born 1973), retired English association football player
- Matt Ford (writer), Australian television screenwriter and musician formerly known as Pinky Beecroft
- Matt Ford (comedian) (born 1995), member of The Inspired Unemployed
- Matt Ford, a.k.a. DJ Format, British hip hop DJ
- Matt Ford, English businessman who promotes the motorcycle speedway Poole Pirates

== See also ==
- Matt Forde (born 1982), English comedian
- Mathew Forde (1785–1837), MP for Down, 1821
