= Steve Armas =

American soccer player and coach (born 1977)

Personal information
- Full name: Anibal Armas
- Date of birth: March 2, 1977 (age 49)
- Place of birth: Germantown, Maryland, U.S.
- Height: 5 ft 8 in (1.73 m)
- Position: Midfielder

College career
| Years | Team | Apps | (Gls) |
| 1995–1998 | Maryland Terrapins | | |

Senior career*
| Years | Team | Apps | (Gls) |
| 1999 | Maryland Mania | 20 | (1) |
| 2000 | Raleigh Capital Express | 4 | (0) |
| 2000 | D.C. United | 0 | (0) |
| 2000 | Columbus Crew | 4 | (0) |
| 2000 | → MLS Pro 40 (loan) | 1 | (1) |
| 2001 | Atlanta Silverbacks | 6 | (0) |
| 2001 | Minnesota Thunder | 16 | (3) |
| 2002 | Cincinnati Riverhawks | 3 | (0) |
| 2003 | Carolina Dynamo | 17 | (5) |
| 2004 | Pittsburgh Riverhounds | 17 | (0) |
| 2005 | Carolina Dynamo | 12 | (0) |

International career
| 1993 | United States U-17 | | |

Managerial career
- 2004–2005: Carolina Dynamo (assistant)
- 2004–2005: Greensboro Pride (assistant)
- 2006–2010: Campbell Fighting Camels (assistant)
- 2010–2015: Campbell Fighting Camels
- 2015–: Wake Forest Demon Deacons (assistant)
- * Club domestic league appearances and goals

Anibal "Steve" Armas (born March 2, 1977) is an American retired soccer midfielder who is a currently associate head coach for the Wake Forest Demon Deacons men's soccer program. Armas previously spent one season in Major League Soccer and several seasons in the United Soccer Leagues. He was a member of the United States U-17 men's national soccer team at the 1993 FIFA U-17 World Championship. Coaching wise he served as a head and assistant coach at Campbell University, Greensboro College and the Carolina Dynamo.

== Player ==
=== Youth ===
Armas grew up in Maryland where he was an NSCAA and Parade Magazine High School All American soccer player at the Bullis School. He is a member of the Bullis School's Athletic Hall of Fame. Armas attended the University of Maryland, playing on the men's soccer team from 1995 to 1998. He scored 11 goals and added 17 assists during his four seasons as a Terrapin. He left school before finishing his degree, but returned and graduated in 2003 with a bachelor's degree in Spanish Language and Literature.

=== Professional ===
In 1999, Armas signed for the Maryland Mania in the USL A-League. He began the 2000 season with the Raleigh Capital Express, playing four games. He also spent time with D.C. United. In June 2000, the Columbus Crew signed Armas as a Discovery Player. He played four regular season games with the Crew. He also played on 2000 Open Cup game for the Crew, coming on for John DeBrito in the 66th minute. He also went on loan to MLS Pro 40 for one game. The Crew waived him at the end of the season. In November 2000, the Tampa Bay Mutiny claimed Armas off waivers, but released him before the season. In 2001, John Dugan, who had coached the Express in 2000, became the new head coach of the Atlanta Silverbacks. He promptly signed Armas. On June 12, 2001, halfway through the season, the Silverbacks traded Armas to the Minnesota Thunder in a three-way trade which sent Andrew Restrepo from the Rochester Rhinos to Atlanta and Stoian Mladenov to the Rhinos from Minnesota. In 2002, Armas played three games with the Cincinnati Riverhawks. In 2003, he played seventeen games for the Carolina Dynamo, scoring five goals and adding 16 assists as the Dynamo took the league title. Armas was selected as a first team All Star. He then moved to the Pittsburgh Riverhounds for the 2004 USL Second Division season and was back with Carolina for the 2005 season.

=== National team ===
In 1993, Armas was a member of the U.S. U-17 national team which went to the second round of the 1993 FIFA U-17 World Championship. Armas played all four U.S. games in the tournament.

== Coach ==
In 2004, Armas became an assistant coach with the Carolina Dynamo. That fall he added to his responsibilities when he became an assistant coach at Greensboro College. While at Greensboro College, Armas helped to guide the men's program to a 2005 USA South Conference tournament championship and a second round NCAA tournament appearance. Armas was hired as an assistant coach by Campbell University in July 2006. Since Armas' arrival in 2006, the Fighting Camels have compiled a 45–29–6 overall record (.600), including a 25–4–5 mark (.809) in the Atlantic Sun Conference regular season. The Camels finished ranked among the top-10 in the final South Region poll in 2006, 2007 and 2008 and earned the school's first year-end national ranking (No. 25) in 2008 at the Division I level. He was named head coach of the Fighting Camels in January 2010 after the departure of then head coach Doug Hess to Drexel University Philadelphia, Pa.
