= Gustavo Leal =

Gustavo Leal may refer to:

- Gustavo Leal (football manager) (born 1986), Brazilian football manager
- Gustavo Leal (footballer) (born 1972), Argentine football forward
