= Andrew Restrepo =

American soccer player

Personal information
- Date of birth: October 8, 1970 (age 56)
- Place of birth: Bridgeport, Connecticut, U.S.
- Height: 6 ft 2 in (1.88 m)
- Position: Defender

Youth career
- 1985–1989: Cardinal Mooney Cougars
- 1990–1991: Lees McRae Bobcats
- 1991–1992: South Florida Bulls

Senior career*
Years	Team	Apps	(Gls)
1993–1994	Orlando Lions		
1995	Tampa Bay Cyclones		
1995	Condor		
1995	Club Santa Fe		
1996	MetroStars	5	(0)
1997	New Orleans Riverboat Gamblers	26	(0)
1998	→ New Orleans Storm	21	(1)
1999–2001	Rochester Rhinos	35	(0)
2001	Atlanta Silverbacks	15	(0)
2008	Clearwater Galactics		

Managerial career
- 2019–: Tampa Spartans (asst.)
- * Club domestic league appearances and goals

Andrew Restrepo (born October 8, 1970) is an American retired soccer defender who played one season with the MetroStars in Major League Soccer. He is currently a volunteer assistant coach for the University of Tampa men's team.

Restrepo played college soccer at Lees McRae in 1989 and 1990 then transferred to University of South Florida in 1991 and 1992. In 1993, Restrepo signed with the Orlando Lions in the USISL. He remained with the Lions through the 1994 season. In the spring of 1995, he signed with the Tampa Bay Cyclones. He then moved to Colombia in the fall of 1995 where he played for Condor and then Club Santa Fe. In February 1996, the MetroStars selected Restreppo in the 13th round (129th overall) of the 1996 MLS Inaugural Player Draft. He played five games for the MetroStars before being waived. On April 22, 1997, he signed with the New Orleans Riverboat Gamblers. In 1998, the Gamblers became known as the New Orleans Storm. Restrepo remained with the team through the 1998 seasons. In 1999, Restrepo moved to the Rochester Rhinos where they became the first, and as of 2022, only non-Division I team to win the 1999 U.S. Open Cup since the inception of Major League Soccer, defeating four MLS teams in the tournament. . On June 12, 2001, the Rhinos sent Restrepo to the Atlanta Silverbacks as part of a three-way deal which sent Steve Armas to the Minnesota Thunder and Stoian Mladenov to the Rhinos. He finished the season in Atlanta, playing 15 games. In 2008, he played for the Clearwater Galactics in the 2008 U.S. Open Cup.
