= Tyrone Gordon =

American soccer player (born 1985)

Personal information
- Full name: Tyrone Gordon
- Date of birth: April 26, 1985 (age 41)
- Place of birth: Milwaukee, WI, United States
- Height: 5 ft 9 in (1.75 m)
- Position: Forward

Senior career*
| Years | Team | Apps | (Gls) |
| 2006 | Minnesota Thunder | 6 | (0) |
| 2006–2008 | Milwaukee Wave (indoor) | 16 | (5) |
- * Club domestic league appearances and goals as of December 22, 2006

Tyrone Gordon (born August 26, 1985 in Milwaukee, Wisconsin) is an American soccer forward.

Gordon attended Vincent High School in Milwaukee, Wisconsin. In 2006, he played six games for the Minnesota Thunder of the USL First Division.
