= Sean Finn =

Sean Finn may refer to:

- Sean Finn (DJ), German DJ from Stuttgart
- Sean Finn (footballer) (born 1978), retired Irish association football defender
- Sean C. Finn (1889–1921), Irish Republican Army commander
