= Brian Ashton (soccer) =

Canadian former soccer player

Personal information
- Full name: Brian Ashton
- Date of birth: September 5, 1974 (age 52)
- Place of birth: Sudbury, Ontario
- Height: 5 ft 9 in (1.75 m)
- Position: Defensive midfielder

Senior career*
Years	Team	Apps	(Gls)
1992	London Lasers	3	(0)
1998–2004	Toronto Lynx	159	(13)
2002	→ Mississauga Olympians (loan)	3	(0)

International career^{‡}
1991	Canada U17	2	(0)
1992	Canada U20	5	(1)
1994	Canada U23	4	(0)
- * Club domestic league appearances and goals as of January 2, 2015 ‡ National team caps and goals as of n/a

Brian Ashton (born September 5, 1974) is a Canadian former soccer player who played notably with the Toronto Lynx, and is currently the Ontario Soccer Association Region 6 Head Coach.

== Professional career ==
Ashton attended St. Charles College, where he played soccer. Ashton was a key part of the 1990 and 1993 NOSSA title for St. Charles.

Ashton began playing professional soccer with the London Lasers in 1992. Although receiving a tryout offer from Premier League club Sheffield United in 1993, he never officially made the squad.

He later played with the Toronto Lynx of the USL A-League in 1998 the second year of the franchise's inception. He made his debut for the club on April 9, 1998, in an exhibition match against the Rochester Rhinos. During his tenure with the Lynx he was awarded the Toronto Lynx Fan Favorite award a record five times including a Public Relations award. He held the record for most club appearances for the Lynx, until he was surpassed by David Diplacido in 2006. In the 2000 USL A-League season he assisted Toronto by reaching the post season for the second time in the franchise's history. In the playoffs Ashton scored a goal in the conference quarterfinals against the Long Island Rough Riders, which resulted in a 2–1 victory. The Lynx playoff run came to an end in the Eastern Conference Final against the Rochester Rhinos in a 2–1 loss on aggregate.

Once the 2002 A-League season came to a conclusion he was loaned to the Mississauga Olympians of the Canadian Professional Soccer League. He made his debut on September 11, 2002, in an Open Canada Cup match against the Toronto Croatia. He helped the Olympians secure a playoff berth by finishing second in the Western Conference, but unfortunately were defeated by the North York Astros in a wild card match. On February 12, 2004, Ashton announced his retirement from professional soccer after he was offered a regional coach of youth development position with the Ontario Soccer Association.

== International career ==
Ashton made his national team debut on March 25, 1991, with the Canada men's national under-17 soccer team at the 1991 CONCACAF U-17 Tournament. He later featured with the Canada men's national under-20 soccer team in the 1992 CONCACAF U-20 Tournament. He also played with the Canada men's national under-23 soccer team at the 1994 Jeux de la Francophonie.
