= Chris Penny =

English-born American soccer player

Personal information
- Full name: Christian Vincent Penny
- Date of birth: 16 February 1973 (age 53)
- Place of birth: Rochford, Hampshire, England
- Position: Defender

Senior career*
Years	Team	Apps	(Gls)
1991	Brigg Town		
1992	Doncaster Rovers	1	(0)
1992	Grimsby Town	1	(0)
1992	Grantham Town	3	(0)
1992–1995	Lock Haven Bald Eagles		
1996–1997	Philadelphia KiXX (indoor)	22	(0)
1997–2000	Hershey Wildcats	83	(1)
- * Club domestic league appearances and goals

Chris Penny is an English retired footballer who played professionally in the USL A-League and National Professional Soccer League.

Penny had a brief career in England before moving to the United States. In 1991, he moved from Brigg Town F.C. to Doncaster Rovers F.C. In February 1992, he played one game for Doncaster Rovers F.C. In April 1992, Penny played four games with Grantham Town F.C. In the fall of 1992, Penny came to the United States on a scholarship to Lock Haven University of Pennsylvania where he was a 1994 and 1995 First Team Division II All American. The expansion Philadelphia KiXX selected Penny in the Territorial Round of the NPSL Amateur Draft as the first player they signed. In the spring of 1997, Penny moved to the Hershey Wildcats of the USISL A-League. While playing, he also pursued a graduate degree in education at Pennsylvania State University. Since his retirement from playing, Penny is a full professor and teaches at West Chester University College of Education.

Penny is divorced and has three boys.
