= Buzz Lagos =

American soccer coach

Buzz Lagos is the former head coach of the Minnesota Thunder. Until he retired in 2005, he was the only coach in team history. He coached the Thunder for 16 years with an impressive overall record of 324–148–46, and led the team to four A-league Championship matches (1998, 1999, 2000, 2003), winning the championship match in 1999. He also taught math at St. Paul Academy and coached the SPA soccer team during their powerhouse years in the 1980s.

Buzz currently resides in St. Paul, Minnesota with his wife Sarah. He is the father of eight children and more than twenty grandchildren all of which are involved in soccer. Two of his children, Manny Lagos and Gerard Lagos, have been professional players.
