= Dan O'Brien (soccer) =

American soccer player

Personal information
- Full name: Daniel O'Brien
- Date of birth: April 5, 1986 (age 40)
- Place of birth: Shoreview, Minnesota, United States
- Height: 5 ft 10 in (1.78 m)
- Position: Midfielder

Team information
- Current team: Minneapolis City SC

Youth career
- 2004–2005: Coastal Carolina Chanticleers
- 2006–2007: UW–Green Bay Phoenix

Senior career*
| Years | Team | Apps | (Gls) |
| 2007–2008 | Des Moines Menace | 3 | (0) |
| 2008–2009 | Minnesota Thunder | 3 | (0) |
| 2010 | Western Suburbs FC | 21 | (9) |
| 2010–2011 | Hawke's Bay United | 5 | (0) |
| 2012 | Tampa Bay Rowdies | 5 | (0) |
| 2017– | Minneapolis City SC | 0 | (0) |
- * Club domestic league appearances and goals as of December 28, 2016

Daniel O'Brien (born April 5, 1986, in Shoreview, Minnesota) is an American soccer player who plays as a midfielder for Minneapolis City SC in the NPSL.

== Career ==
=== Youth and college ===
O’Brien attended Mounds View High School in Arden Hills, Minnesota where he was a two time All State soccer player. O’Brien began his collegiate soccer career in 2004 with Coastal Carolina University. He transferred to the University of Wisconsin–Green Bay in 2006, finishing his college career with them in 2007. In the summer of 2007, he played for the Des Moines Menace of the Premier Development League.

=== Professional ===
On May 1, 2008, he signed with the Minnesota Thunder of the USL First Division. After the fall of the Minnesota Thunder side due to financial problems O'Brien in January 2010 took the chance to move to New Zealand and join Western Suburbs FC working with Dutch coach John Kila. After a season of hard work with Western Suburbs FC he joined Hawke's Bay United before departing the club after a short stint and signing with the Tampa Bay Rowdies on March 30, 2012. On November 20, 2012, the Rowdies declined the 2013 option.
