= Youssouf Kanté =

French footballer (born 1984)

Personal information
- Full name: Youssouf Kanté
- Date of birth: August 13, 1984 (age 42)
- Place of birth: Paris, France
- Height: 5 ft 8 in (1.73 m)
- Position: Forward

Youth career
- –2004: Paris Saint-Germain

Senior career*
Years	Team	Apps	(Gls)
2004–2005	ADO Den Haag		
2006	Windisch		
2007	Astra Ploieşti		
2008	Seattle Sounders	22	(2)
2009	Minnesota Thunder	8	(0)
2009–2010	Senica	4	(1)
2010–2011	Baulmes	1	(1)
- * Club domestic league appearances and goals as of 11 July 2011

Youssouf Kanté (born August 13, 1984) is a French footballer who recently played for Baulmes.

== Career ==
=== Europe ===
Kanté began playing soccer in the youth academy of the esteemed French club Paris Saint-Germain. When he turned nineteen, he signed with ADO Den Haag of the Dutch Second Division. In 2006 when he signed with Swiss club Windisch, and then moved to Romania and was offered a mid season contract by Astra Ploieşti. Upon completion of the season, Kanté was offered a trial by Câmpina, however, chose to play in the United States instead.

=== North America ===
After unsuccessful trials with Major League Soccer teams Kansas City Wizards and Toronto in early 2008, Kanté signed with the Seattle Sounders on April 24, 2008.

Following the USL Sounders' demise (as a result of Seattle Sounders FC joining Major League Soccer), Kanté signed with Minnesota Thunder on 17 February 2009.
