= Igor Šošo =

Serbian footballer (born 1976)

Personal information
- Date of birth: 27 August 1976 (age 50)
- Place of birth: Belgrade, SR Serbia, SFR Yugoslavia

Senior career*
Years	Team	Apps	(Gls)
1999–2000	Club Africain		
2001–2002	Milwaukee Rampage	33	(9)
- KMF SAS
- KMF Nova Pazova
- * Club domestic league appearances and goals

Igor Šošo (born 27 August 1976) is a Serbian retired footballer and futsal player who played for the Milwaukee Rampage in the A-League.

== Career statistics ==
Club	Season	League			Cup		Continental		Other		Total	
Club	Season	Division	Apps	Goals	Apps	Goals	Apps	Goals	Apps	Goals	Apps	Goals
Milwaukee Rampage	2001	A-League	22	6	0	0	–		0	0	22	6
Milwaukee Rampage	2002	A-League	11	3	0	0	–		0	0	11	3
Career total			33	9	0	0	0	0	0	0	33	9
