= Dennis Fadeski =

American soccer player

Personal information
- Date of birth: October 24, 1977 (age 49)
- Place of birth: Richmond, California, U.S.
- Height: 5 ft 10 in (1.78 m)
- Position: Defender

Youth career
- 1996–1999: Indiana Hoosiers
- 1998–1999: Wisconsin Rebels

Senior career*
Years	Team	Apps	(Gls)
2000–2003	Milwaukee Rampage	84	(4)
2004	Milwaukee Wave United	14	(0)
- * Club domestic league appearances and goals

Dennis Fadeski is an American retired soccer defender who played professionally in the USL A-League.

Fadeski graduated from Brooksfield East High School where he was a two-sport athlete – soccer and wrestling. Fadeski won the state wrestling title his senior season and was part of the undefeated 1995 high school state championship soccer team. Fadeski attended Indiana University, playing for the men's soccer team from 1996 to 1999. In 1998 and 1999, the Hoosiers won the NCAA Division I Men's Soccer Championship. In 1998 and 1999, he also played for the Wisconsin Rebels of the USL Premier Development League. In February 2000, the Milwaukee Rampage selected Fadeski in the Territorial Round of the 2000 A-League Draft. Fadeski spent four seasons with the Rampage. When the Rampage ceased operations in 2003, Fadeski moved to the Milwaukee Wave United for the 2004 season.
