= John Coughlin (soccer) =

American soccer player

Personal information
- Date of birth: December 30, 1972 (age 53)
- Place of birth: St. Paul, Minnesota, U.S.
- Height: 6 ft 4 in (1.93 m)
- Position: Defender

Youth career
- 1991: Milwaukee Panthers
- 1992–1993: Vermont Catamounts

Senior career*
Years	Team	Apps	(Gls)
1991–2002	Minnesota Thunder		
- * Club domestic league appearances and goals

John Coughlin is an American retired soccer defender who spent eleven seasons with the Minnesota Thunder.

Coughlin graduated from St. Paul Academy where he was an All State high school soccer player. In 1990, he was on the Spartan Randolph Blackhawks team which won the McGuire Cup (U-19 national championship). In 1991, Coughlin played a single season with University of Wisconsin–Milwaukee soccer team. He then transferred to the University of Vermont for 1992 and 1993 collegiate seasons. In 1991, Coughline joined the Minnesota Thunder, an unaffiliated amateur club. He retired at the end of the 2001 season. In 1994, Minnesota entered the USISL. In 1999, he was Second Team All League as the Thunder won the USL A-League championship. From 1996 to 2001, he played 107 league games and scored 8 goals.
