= Don Gramenz =

American soccer player and manager

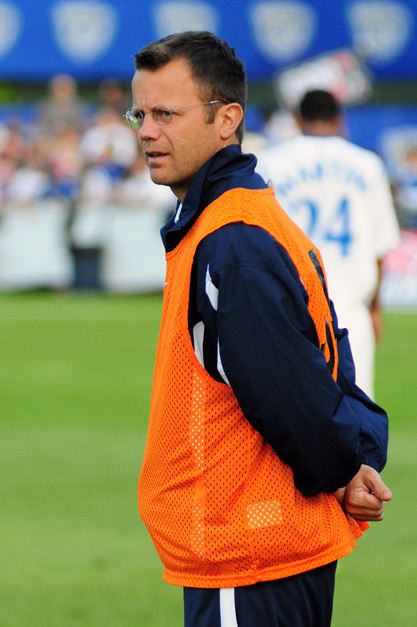

Personal information
- Date of birth: March 20, 1971 (age 55)
- Place of birth: Cottage Grove, Minnesota, United States
- Height: 1.69 m (5 ft 6 1/2 in)
- Position: Left back

Youth career
- 1990–1993: University of Wisconsin–Milwaukee

Senior career*
Years	Team	Apps	(Gls)
1991–2003	Minnesota Thunder	212	(17)
2001	→ Tampa Bay Mutiny (loan)	1	(0)

Managerial career
- 2008: Minnesota Thunder
- * Club domestic league appearances and goals

Don Gramenz is an American former professional soccer player who played as a defender for Minnesota Thunder for eleven seasons, being named to the club's Hall of Fame. Gramenz played collegiately at the University of Wisconsin–Milwaukee, where he was a team captain. In 2008, he served as the interim manager of the Minnesota Thunder, succeeding Amos Magee. Gramenz move into teaching after his soccer career and worked as an elementary school teacher for 11 years before eventually moving into a role as an elementary school principal in Bloomington, Minnesota.
