= John Swallen =

American soccer player

Personal information
- Date of birth: June 16, 1965 (age 61)
- Place of birth: Vadnais Heights, Minnesota, USA
- Height: 1.85 m (6 ft 1 in)
- Position: Goalkeeper

Youth career
- Ripon College

Senior career*
Years	Team	Apps	(Gls)
1990–2001	Minnesota Thunder		
- * Club domestic league appearances and goals as of August 7, 2008

John Swallen is a retired American soccer player who played professionally with the Minnesota Thunder for twelve seasons. Swallen, a goalkeeper, was named to the Thunder Hall of Fame in 2002, following the conclusion of his Thunder career. Swallen was named the USL First Division (then known as the A League) MVP and goalkeeper of the year for the 1999 season.
