= Matthew Ford (footballer) =

English footballer

Personal information
- Date of birth: 23 April 1973 (age 53)
- Place of birth: Grimsby, England
- Position: Midfielder

College career
Years	Team	Apps	(Gls)
1991–1994	Lock Haven Bald Eagles		

Senior career*
Years	Team	Apps	(Gls)
1995–1996	Delaware Wizards		
1999–2000	Hershey Wildcats	45	(5)
- * Club domestic league appearances and goals

Matthew Ford is an English retired footballer who played professionally in the USL A-League and was the 2006 USL Executive of the Year.

== Player ==
Ford attended Lock Haven University of Pennsylvania, playing on the men's soccer team from 1991 to 1994. He graduated with a bachelor's degree in recreation. In 1995 and 1996, he played for the Delaware Wizards of the USISL. He returned to playing in 1998 with the Hershey Wildcats of the USL A-League. Ford retired from playing after the 2000 season.

== Executive ==
In 1998, Ford became the Team Operations coordinator for the Hershey Wildcats. He was the 1998 A-League Operation's Director of the Year. In October 2000, he became the General Manager for the Wildcats. In December 2001, Ford became the General Manager of the Sports and Entertainment Group which managed several sports operations in Hershey, including the Giant Center. In January 2006, Ford was hired as vice president of the Rochester Rhinos. He was named the 2006 USL Executive of the Year. In April 2008, Ford became the president of the Rhinos. In September 2009, the Rhinos fired Ford.
