= Neathan Gibson =

Zimbabwean footballer and football executive (born 1970)

Personal information
- Full name: Neathan Gibson
- Date of birth: 14 May 1970 (age 56)
- Place of birth: Bulawayo, Rhodesia
- Height: 1.90 m (6 ft 3 in)
- Position: Striker

Team information
- Current team: Dynamo Youth

Youth career
- 1991–1994: Lynn Fighting Knights

Senior career*
Years	Team	Apps	(Gls)
1994	San Jose Grizzlies (indoor)		
1995–1996	Sarawak FA		(19)
1997	IFK Norrköping	19	(13)
1997–1998	Albirex Niigata	22	(14)
1998–2000	MYPA	61	(26)
2001	Colorado Rapids	8	(0)
2001	Rochester Raging Rhinos	12	(0)
2002	Des Moines Menace		(11)
2004	West Michigan Edge	14	(3)
2010	Des Moines Menace	1	(0)

Managerial career
- 2002: Des Moines Menace (Assistant)
- 2003–2004: West Michigan Edge
- 2006–: Ferris State University
- 2008: West Michigan Fire
- 2010–: Des Moines Menace (Assistant/Boys DOC)
- * Club domestic league appearances and goals as of 18 June 2010

Neathan Gibson (born 14 May 1970) is a Zimbabwean soccer player currently coaching and executive director for Michigan Fire Juniors in Georgetown, Michigan.

== Career ==
=== College ===
Gibson played four years of college soccer at Lynn University, where he was a first team NAIA All-American and claimed Most Valuable Player Award laurels in the 1994 National Collegiate Senior Bowl. He also helped lead Lynn to the NAIA National Championship in 1991.

=== Professional ===
Gibson signed his first professional contract in 1994 when he signed with the San Jose Grizzlies of the Continental Indoor Soccer League. He later spent time playing in Malaysia with the Sarawak FA and in Japan with Albirex Niigata, before moving to Sweden where he played in the Allsvenskan for IFK Norrköping.

Gibson moved to Finland in 1998 and played two years in the Veikkausliiga for MYPA. MYPA finished third in the league in both years Gibson played, qualifying for the 2000 InterToto Cup, with Gibson setting a new club single-season goal scoring record with 20 goals.

Gibson played in Major League Soccer for the Colorado Rapids in 2001, and also played for the Rochester Raging Rhinos winning the Championship title in the A-League before retiring from the Professional game.

Gibson briefly came out of retirement in 2010 at the age of 40 when, having already been hired as head coach Laurie Calloway's assistant, he agreed to join the playing roster of Des Moines Menace in the USL Premier Development League; he played his first game for the team on 18 June 2010 as a substitute in a game against Thunder Bay Chill, in which he tallied an assist and came close to scoring on several occasions.

== Coaching career ==
Gibson has extensive coaching experience, having coached youth boys and girls squads overseas in both Finland and Japan during his playing career. Gibson worked with the Des Moines Menace in the early 2000s prior to him being hired as the head coach for the West Michigan Edge of the USL Premier Development League from November 2003 to November 2004.

In 2006, Gibson accepted a head coaching job with Ferris State University in the Great Lakes Intercollegiate Athletic Conference in Big Rapids, Michigan. In his first year, Gibson directed the Bulldogs to a 7–11 overall mark along with a fifth-place GLIAC finish.
