= Jakob Fenger-Larsen =

Danish footballer (born 1971)

Personal information
- Date of birth: 6 February 1971 (age 55)
- Place of birth: Odder, Denmark
- Height: 5 ft 10 in (1.78 m)
- Positions: Forward; midfielder

Senior career*
Years	Team	Apps	(Gls)
1989–1994	AGF Aarhus	-	(-)
1996–1997	Lindsey Wilson College		
1998–2000	Hampton Roads Mariners	60	(23)
1998–1999	Harrisburg Heat (indoor)	36	(1)
2001	Nashville Metros	24	(21)
2002	Minnesota Thunder	25	(8)
2003–2006	Virginia Beach Mariners	96	(38)
2007	Hampton Roads Piranhas	1	(0)
- * Club domestic league appearances and goals

Jakob Fenger-Larsen (born 6 February 1971) was a Danish association football player who played professionally in Denmark and in the U.S. divisions.

From 1989 to 1994, Fenger played for AGF Aarhus. In 1996 and 1997, Fenger attended Lindsey Wilson College, playing on the men's soccer team in 1996 and 1997. In 1996, the Blue Raiders won the NAIA national men's soccer championship. In 1998, Fenger signed with the Hampton Roads Mariners of the USISL A-League. He played for the Mariners through the 2000 season. In the fall of 1998, he moved indoors with the Harrisburg Heat of the National Professional Soccer League. In 2001, the Mariners went on hiatus and Fenger moved to the Nashville Metros of the USL A-League where he was the league's third leading scorer. He was set for a move to English Football Conference side Nuneaton Borough in 2001, but was denied a work permit. On 14 December 2001 Fenger signed with the Minnesota Thunder. Jakob Fenger played with the Virginia Beach Mariners in 2003 through 2007. On 17 April 2007 Fenger signed with the Hampton Roads Piranhas of the USL Premier Development League.
