= Gerard Lagos =

American soccer player

Personal information
- Date of birth: 25 August 1968 (age 58)
- Place of birth: St Paul, MN, USA
- Height: 1.85 m (6 ft 1 in)
- Position: Striker

College career
Years	Team	Apps	(Gls)
1988–1990	Milwaukee Panthers		

Senior career*
Years	Team	Apps	(Gls)
1990–2001	Minnesota Thunder	?	(44)

International career
1989	United States U20	5	(0)
- * Club domestic league appearances and goals

Gerard Lagos (born 25 August 1968) is an American former professional soccer player who played for the Minnesota Thunder. His father is Buzz Lagos and his brother is Manny Lagos.

== Professional ==
Lagos spent his entire career with the Minnesota Thunder, scoring the team's first goal in 1990. The Thunder were created by Lagos' father Buzz in 1990 as an unaffiliated amateur team. The Thunder played their first game against the professional Winnipeg Fury of the Canadian Soccer League. Lagos scored the first goal of the game, a 2–1 victory for the Thunder. In 1994, the Thunder turned professional with the USISL. When Lagos retired in 2001, he was the last surviving member of the original team. He was inducted into the Thunder Hall of Fame in 2002.

== National team ==
In 1989, Lagos was an integral part of the United States U20 national team which took fourth place at the 1989 FIFA World Youth Championship. He played five games, in the tournament.
