= Morgan Zeba =

Swedish footballer

Personal information
- Date of birth: 24 August 1974 (age 52)
- Place of birth: Malmö, Sweden
- Position: Midfielder

Senior career*
Years	Team	Apps	(Gls)
1996	Landskrona BoIS	18	(2)
1997	Richmond Kickers		
1998–2001	Minnesota Thunder	92	(14)
2002	Charleston Battery	27	(1)

International career
1990–1991	Sweden U17	11	(1)
1992–1993	Sweden U19	7	(0)
- * Club domestic league appearances and goals

Morgan Zeba (born 24 August 1974) is a Swedish former professional footballer who played as a midfielder.

== Club career ==
Zeba played for Landskrona BoIS in Division 2 Södra Götaland 1996.

In 1997, Zeba played for the Richmond Kickers in the USISL. On 16 April 1998 he signed with the Minnesota Thunder and played for them through the 2001 season. In 1999, Zeba and his teammates won the USL A-League championship. He became a free agent in September 2001 and signed with the Charleston Battery for the 2002 season.

== International career ==
He also played for the Swedish youth national teams.
