= Jukka Rantala =

Finnish footballer (born 1975)

Personal information
- Date of birth: August 1, 1975 (age 51)
- Place of birth: Rauma, Finland
- Height: 5 ft 11 in (1.80 m)
- Positions: Midfielder; defender

Senior career*
Years	Team	Apps	(Gls)
1993–1994	Pallo-Iirot	40	(0)
1995	Kuusysi	17	(0)
1996	Haka	15	(0)
1996	Pallo-Iirot	1	(0)
1997–2000	Haka	65	(0)
2001	Charleston Battery	25	(0)
2002–2003	Haka	40	(0)
2003	Pallo-Sepot-44	2	(0)
- * Club domestic league appearances and goals

Jukka Rantala is a retired Finnish association football player who played professionally in Finland and the USL A-League.

Rantal spent his entire career in the Finnish leagues except for the 2001 season. That year, he played for the Charleston Battery in the USL A-League. On April 9, 2002, Rantala returned to Haka. Rantala gained his greatest success with FC Haka. In 1998, Haka won the league title. The team also won the 1997 and 2002 Finnish Cup. The 1998 victory put them into the 1998–99 UEFA Cup Winners' Cup where they fell to Panionios in the first round.
