= Philippe Godoy =

French footballer (born 1971)

Personal information
- Date of birth: 23 April 1971 (age 55)
- Place of birth: Grenoble, France
- Height: 1.69 m (5 ft 7 in)
- Position: Midfielder

Senior career*
Years	Team	Apps	(Gls)
1989–1993	Grenoble	79	(9)
1993–1994	Brest	29	(0)
1994–1997	Grenoble	65	(14)
1995	→ Sabadell (loan)		
1996	→ Tours (loan)	19	(7)
1997–1999	Olympique Alès	59	(9)
2000	Cincinnati Riverhawks	23	(2)
2001	Milwaukee Rampage	25	(1)
2002	Atlanta Silverbacks	18	(1)
2003	Cincinnati Riverhawks	3	(0)
2004	Atlanta Silverbacks	9	(1)
2007–2009	Seyssinet-Pariset		
- * Club domestic league appearances and goals

Philippe Godoy is a French former professional footballer who played as a midfielder in France and the United States.

== Career ==
In 1989, Godoy began his career with Grenoble Foot 38. After a single season with Stade Brestois 29 (1993–1994), he returned to Grenoble where he played until 1997. That year, he moved to Olympique Alès. In 2000, Godoy moved to the United States and signed with the Cincinnati Riverhawks of the USL A-League. In 2001, Godoy was First Team All League with the Milwaukee Rampage. On 26 March 2003, he returned to the Riverhawks. They released him in May 2003. In 2004, Godoy briefly played for the Silverbacks. From 2007 to 2009, he played for Seyssinet-Pariset AC.
