= Jamel Mitchell =

American soccer player (born 1975)

Personal information
- Full name: Jamel Mitchell
- Date of birth: May 26, 1975 (age 51)
- Place of birth: Honolulu, Hawaii, U.S.
- Height: 6 ft 1 in (1.85 m)
- Position: Forward

Youth career
- 1993–1996: Sacramento State University

Senior career*
Years	Team	Apps	(Gls)
1997	Nashville Metros	23	(17)
1997	→ Kansas City Wizards (loan)	1	(0)
1998–2000	Hershey Wildcats	82	(38)
2001	Rochester Raging Rhinos	22	(5)
2002	Atlanta Silverbacks	4	(0)
2003–2005	Rochester Raging Rhinos	30	(3)
2006	Harrisburg City Islanders	18	(6)
- * Club domestic league appearances and goals

Jamel Mitchell (born May 26, 1975) is an American retired soccer forward who last played professionally in Major League Soccer, the USL First Division and USL Second Division.

Although born in Hawaii, Mitchell spent several years in Virginia before moving to San Diego, California where he graduated from Mount Miguel High School. He also played for the La Jolla Nomads youth club but gave up soccer his senior season of high school to play quarterback for his high school team. Mitchell attended Sacramento State University, playing on the men's soccer team from 1993 to 1996. In 1997, Mitchell signed with the Nashville Metros of the USISL A-League. In September 1997, the Metros loaned Mitchell to the Kansas City Wizards of Major League Soccer where he played one regular season and several playoff games. He spent the 1998 pre-season with the Wizards before being cut on April 2, 1998. He then signed with the Hershey Wildcats where he played three seasons.
