= Jaymi Bailey =

American soccer player (born 1976)

Personal information
- Full name: Jaymison Bailey
- Date of birth: September 20, 1976 (age 50)
- Place of birth: Florida, U.S.
- Position: Midfielder

College career
Years	Team	Apps	(Gls)
1995–1998	Tampa Spartans		

Senior career*
Years	Team	Apps	(Gls)
1998	Southwest Florida Manatees		
1999–2000	Hampton Roads Mariners	48	(3)
2001	Nashville Metros	25	(4)
2002	Raleigh CASL Elite	4	(1)
2002	West Michigan Edge	11	(5)
2006	Nashville Metros	0	(0)
- * Club domestic league appearances and goals

Jaymi Bailey is an American retired soccer player who played professionally in the USL A-League.

Bailey grew up in Fruitland Park, Florida. He attended the University of Tampa, playing on the men's soccer team from 1995 to 1998. In 1998, he spent the summer with the Southwest Florida Manatees of the USISL D-3 Pro League. In 1999, Bailey turned professional with the Hampton Roads Mariners. After two seasons in Hampton Roads, Bailey moved to the Nashville Metros in 2001, leading the league in assists that season. He was hampered by injuries and spent 2002 with both Raleigh CASL Elite and the West Michigan Edge. He retired at the end of the season, but attempted a comeback in 2006 with the Nashville Metros.
