= The Inspired Unemployed =

Australian satirical comedy duo

- Notable work: The Inspired Unemployed (podcast); The Inspired Unemployed (Impractical) Jokers

Comedy career
- Years active: 2019–present
- Medium: Social media; podcasting; television
- Genre: Satirical comedy
- Subject: Australian culture
- Members: Matt Ford; Jack Steele
- Website: theinspiredunemployed.com

The Inspired Unemployed are an Australian comedy duo formed in 2019 by Matt Ford and Jack Steele. The pair are best known for their satirical Instagram account, which lampoons Australian societal tropes and has more than two million followers.

Off the back of their online popularity, the Inspired Unemployed launched a Spotify-exclusive podcast of the same name in September 2021, and made their television debut in August 2023 with The Inspired Unemployed (Impractical) Jokers. The pair have also launched their own range of beers under the Better Beer name, debuted a fragrance—Inspiré by No. Emploi—and modelled for brands such as GQ Australia and Vogue Australia.

While the Inspired Unemployed is principally the outlet of Ford and Steele, they are often joined by a recurring cast of housemates and friends for appearances in online videos and podcast episodes. The pair's housemates, Dom Littrich and Liam Moore, also co-starred in the television series.

== Background ==
Matt "Falcon" Ford (born c. 1995 in Gerringong) and Jack Steele (born c. 1994 in Minnamurra) became friends in around 2008 while living in their hometown of Kiama. The pair attended Kiama High School together and each took up a trade after leaving high school in year 11, with Ford working various apprenticeship jobs as a landscaper, bricklayer and carpenter, while Steele was a plasterer for his father's business.

The duo first began creating content alongside their friends in 2016. Losing passion for their employment on the job site, Ford and Steele began filming short skits while living in Queenstown, New Zealand for six months, posting them on their individual Instagram accounts. They also began Instagram and Facebook accounts to house the content, known as "Pine Tree TV", which began in June 2016 and was last active in May 2017.

== Career ==
Continuing to travel, the pair filmed skits while in Europe and launched a new Instagram page titled "The Inspired Unemployed"; the first video still available on the page was posted in February 2019. The name was derived from the duo having recently quit their jobs to search for inspiration overseas. Steele described the reason for the page's creation as "a résumé to get into entertainment" in the hope that the videos would "get a little bit of traction that will help us do something in the industry". In the first seven months of the page's existence, the duo had amassed approximately 9,000 followers. Their breakout clip—a choreographed dance routine filmed alongside three friends dressed in all black and set to La Bouche's "Be My Lover"—saw the page's audience rise to 30,000 followers; the duo were signed by management company Born Bred Talent within three days of the video going live.

By January 2020, both Ford and Steele had turned the Inspired Unemployed into their full-time jobs, having reached 100,000 followers on Instagram. They collaborated with Italian fashion house Fendi as part of a cover shoot for GQ Australia's GQ Style online magazine, were guests at Vogue Australia's 60th anniversary event, and filmed a cricket skit at the Sydney Opera House promoting Kayo Sports. A string of successful dance and comedy videos then further amplified the duo's social status, as COVID-19 lockdowns coincided with people consuming more online content. In June 2020, they featured alongside Australian musicians Tuka and Thandi Phoenix in a parody music video based on online shopping during lockdown created for buy now, pay later provider Klarna. Throughout the year, the pair were also involved in numerous fashion shoots and collaborations with Vogue Australia, Louis Vuitton and The Iconic. They had also undertaken partnerships with RM Williams, Red Bull, Canadian Club and Tradie.

In July 2021, ASX-listed alcohol company Mighty Craft announced the impending launch of a zero-carb beer known as Better Beer, a collaboration between the Inspired Unemployed and Torquay Beverage Company. Ford and Steele each hold a 20 per cent stake in the business, in which they contribute to ongoing social media marketing and promotion. The brand was embroiled in a high-profile legal battle with Melbourne-based brewery Brick Lane, who argued in a statement to the Federal Court of Australia in December 2021 that the can design of Better Beer would cause potential confusion with its own Sidewinder brand. In February 2023, the court dismissed Brick Lane's case alleging misleading or deceptive conduct, and ordered it to pay Better Beer's legal costs. The decision came a week after Mighty Craft revealed in its December quarter update that the brand had generated $50 million in retail sales in the last year.

In September 2021, a media salary calculator determined that the Inspired Unemployed were the ninth most successful social media influencers in Australia. That same month, Ford and Steele launched a podcast exclusive to Spotify, also called The Inspired Unemployed. It has consistently ranked in the top five podcasts in Australia since its inception, and was renewed for a third season in October 2023.

The Inspired Unemployed launched their television career in August 2023 with the premiere of The Inspired Unemployed (Impractical) Jokers, a spin-off of the Impractical Jokers format. The eight-part series aired on Network 10 and Paramount+ Australia. At the time, the Inspired Unemployed had more than four million followers across its social media platforms. In September 2024, it was announced the duo will host a new travel series for 10 titled The List in 2025. The series will have 6 episodes and begin airing on 1 May 2025.

In November 2023, the Inspired Unemployed debuted a fragrance—Inspiré by No. Emploi—in partnership with Chemist Warehouse, accompanied by a satirical advertising campaign. All proceeds from sales of the perfume will be distributed to competition entrants who explain why they "need a helping hand".
