= Manny Lagos =

American soccer player (born 1971)

Personal information
- Full name: Manuel Lagos
- Date of birth: June 11, 1971 (age 55)
- Place of birth: St. Paul, Minnesota, United States
- Height: 6 ft 0 in (1.83 m)
- Position: Midfielder

Team information
- Current team: Minnesota United (sporting director)

College career
| Years | Team | Apps | (Gls) |
| 1990–1992 | Milwaukee Panthers | | |

Senior career*
| Years | Team | Apps | (Gls) |
| 1990–1996 | Minnesota Thunder | ? | (29) |
| 1992 | → UE Lleida (loan) | 8 | (0) |
| 1994 | → Clermont-Ferrand (loan) | ? | (?) |
| 1996–1997 | MetroStars | 21 | (0) |
| 1998–1999 | Chicago Fire | 10 | (0) |
| 1999–2000 | Tampa Bay Mutiny | 37 | (12) |
| 2001–2003 | San Jose Earthquakes | 79 | (14) |
| 2004–2005 | Columbus Crew | 23 | (1) |
| Total | | 178 | (56) |

International career
| 2001–2003 | United States | 3 | (0) |

Managerial career
- 2010–2015: Minnesota United FC
- * Club domestic league appearances and goals

Manuel "Manny" Lagos (born June 11, 1971) is an American former professional soccer player who played as a midfielder. He is the former head coach of Minnesota United FC.

== Club career ==
=== Early career ===
Born in St. Paul, Minnesota Lagos played college soccer for the NCAA Division-I Milwaukee Panthers from 1990 to 1992, and was named an NSCAA First-Team All-American in 1991. During and after college, from 1990 to 1996, Manny played for his father with the Minnesota Thunder, first as an amateur and a founding member of the club, and later as a professional. Amidst his Thunder days, he also had short stints with Clermont Foot in the French Third Division, and in Spain's lower divisions with Lleida.

In 1994, the Thunder's last year as an all-amateur side, Lagos led the team through a near-perfect season and was awarded the USL MVP award, having scored 18 goals and 9 assists. Upon leaving the club for MLS in 1996, he was inducted into the Thunder Hall of Fame with career totals of 29 goals and 12 assists; his brother and teammate, Gerard Lagos (who played for the team from 1990 through 2001) is also an inductee. In 2006, Manny was elected to the USL Hall of Fame.

=== MLS ===
In 1996, midway through the inaugural MLS season, Lagos was signed by the MetroStars. He impressed right away, but his season was cut short after he tore his left-knee's ACL, MCL, and LCL in a single horrific injury just six games in. Lagos made a comeback in the next season, playing in 15 league matches, but still impaired and less effective than before. Frustrated with his injuries, the Metros exposed Manny in the 1997 MLS Expansion Draft, where he was taken by the Chicago Fire. Nowhere near fully recovered and considering retirement, he only played one game for the MLS Cup champions in 1998, and went on to make only 9 appearances in 1999, always as a substitute, excluded from the first eleven due to his unreliable health and the Fire's surplus of attacking players.

Lagos' vagabond MLS career took him to the Tampa Bay Mutiny with Ritchie Kotschau on August 2, 1999, part of a trade for Sam George and Paul Dougherty. He came back swinging, scoring 4 goals in 10 games and earning Player of the Week honors. Lagos continued his momentum in 2000, when he scored 8 goals and added 7 assists in 1500 minutes, making him the league's tenth-place leader in points per game, but he would eventually request a trade for personal reasons, as his wife disliked Tampa and wished to pursue her law career elsewhere.

He was dealt to the San Jose Earthquakes in January 2001 on a draft-day trade for second-round and third-round picks, and played for the Earthquakes from 2001 through 2003, starting regularly in every season and winning MLS Cups in the bookend years. He enjoyed what was likely his best season in 2001, playing a key role in the Earthquakes' playoff run by adding 3 goals and 2 assists to regular season totals of 8 and 8. After his tenure with the 'Quakes, Lagos was traded to the Columbus Crew for a third-round draft pick, and was reunited there with long-time friend and youth soccer, college soccer, and Thunder teammate Tony Sanneh after Sanneh signed with the Crew late in 2004. Manny played 18 games and scored 1 goal for the Crew that year, but never really recovered from the last of his many knee surgeries, seeing his playing time dwindle to 5 appearances in 2005. He was waived by Columbus that May to make room for Chris Henderson and retired in June.

In his nine years in MLS, Lagos scored 27 goals and added 36 assists, plus 4 goals and 4 assists in the postseason. Though right-footed, he spent much of his career on the left side of midfield. Noted for his gangly legs and long, awkward strides, Lagos possessed an unusual style on the ball where his technical skill and knack for dribbling past opponents belied his superficially clumsy appearance. He is remembered as a talented player who was dogged by knee injuries throughout his career.

== International career ==
Lagos began his international career in the 1992 Summer Olympics, when he scored the second goal in a 3–1 win over Kuwait, the team's only victory. His first full cap for the senior national team did not come until over nine years later, on December 9, 2001, against South Korea. He earned three caps for the US from 2001 to 2003, scoring no goals.

== Managerial career ==
In January 2006, Lagos was named the Director of Soccer Operations for the Minnesota Thunder. In this role, he has placed particular emphasis on youth development, community relations, and the team's stadium search. Manny has also done some sporadic work in broadcasting, serving as a color commentator for XM Radio during the 2006 World Cup. On February 10, 2010, Lagos was appointed as the head coach of newly expansion NSC Minnesota Stars following the implosion of the Thunder.

Lagos led the Stars to victory in the 2011 NASL Soccer Bowl, and to a runner up finish in the 2012 Soccer Bowl. After a disappointing 2013 season at the helm of the rebranded Minnesota United FC, Lagos led the Loons to the spring and regular season titles in 2014. He was named the NASL Coach of the Year in 2011 and in 2014, the only coach to have won the award twice.

At the conclusion of the 2014 season and the firing of Tampa Bay Rowdies coach Ricky Hill, Lagos became the longest tenured coach in the NASL. In five seasons with Minnesota, Lagos has a coaching record of 54-47-38 (W-L-D).

Upon the move of Minnesota United FC to MLS, he transitioned to a role as Sporting Director of the club.

== Personal life ==
He is the son of Buzz Lagos, an American soccer coach at both the college and professional levels, and the youngest of eight children.
