= Andreas Maier =

American soccer player

Personal information
- Date of birth: February 11, 1972 (age 54)
- Place of birth: Glendale, New York, U.S.
- Height: 5 ft 10 in (1.78 m)
- Positions: Defender; midfielder

Youth career
- 1990–1994: Rutgers Scarlet Knights

Senior career*
Years	Team	Apps	(Gls)
1996	Tampa Bay Cyclones		
1998	Central Jersey Riptide		
1999	Miami Fusion	0	(0)
1999–2000	Hampton Roads Mariners	39	(0)
2001	Nashville Metros	11	(1)
2002	Atlanta Silverbacks	3	(0)
- * Club domestic league appearances and goals

Andreas Maier is an American retired soccer player who played professionally in the USL A-League.

Maier attended the Rutgers University, playing on the men's soccer team from 1990 to 1994. He then spent time in the German third division before returning to the United States in 1996 to play for the Tampa Bay Cyclones. In 1998, he played for the Central Jersey Riptide. On February 23, 1999, the Miami Fusion signed Maier as a discovery player. The Fusion waived him on April 7, 1999, without Maier seeing any first team games. He then joined the Hampton Roads Mariners where he played until 2000. After spending time in Switzerland, he moved to the Nashville Metros. He finished his career in 2002 with the Atlanta Silverbacks.
