= Jeff Houser =

American soccer player

Personal information
- Date of birth: September 4, 1977 (age 49)
- Place of birth: United States
- Height: 5 ft 8 in (1.73 m)
- Position: Forward

Youth career
- 1995–1996: Tampa Spartans
- 1997–1998: South Florida Bulls

Senior career*
Years	Team	Apps	(Gls)
1999	Lehigh Valley Steam	14	(2)
2001	Nashville Metros	25	(14)
2002	Pittsburgh Riverhounds	19	(4)
Total		58	(20)
- * Club domestic league appearances and goals

Jeffrey “Jeff” Houser is an American retired soccer forward who played professionally in the USL A-League.

Houser attended the University of Tampa, playing on the men's soccer team in 1995 and 1996. He transferred to the University of South Florida for the 1997 and 1998 seasons. In 1999, Houser turned professional with the Lehigh Valley Steam in the USL A-League. In 2000, he tore his anterior cruciate ligament during a pre-season tryout with the Kansas City Wizards. This forced him to sit out the 2000 season. In 2001, he returned to the field with the Nashville Metros of the USL A-League. He finished the season tied for third on the league goals list. He finished his injury-shortened, three-year professional career with the Pittsburgh Riverhounds in 2002.
