= Ali John Utush =

Nicuraguan-American soccer player (born 1977)

Ali-John Utush
Personal information
- Date of birth: November 1, 1977 (age 48)
- Place of birth: Nicaragua
- Height: 6 ft 2 in (1.88 m)
- Positions: Defender; midfielder

College career
Years	Team	Apps	(Gls)
1995	De Anza College		
1996–1998	Saint Mary's Gaels		

Senior career*
Years	Team	Apps	(Gls)
1999	Bay Area Seals	5	(1)
2000	Seattle Sounders	25	(0)
2000	→ Colorado Rapids (loan)	0	(0)
2000–2001	SV Ried		
2001	Seattle Sounders	9	(0)
- * Club domestic league appearances and goals

Ali-John Utush is a retired Nicuraguan-American soccer player who played professionally in the USL A-League.

Utush graduated from Oakmont High School. He began his collegiate career in 1995 at De Anza College. He was an All-West Regional player that season. Utush then transferred to Saint Mary's College of California, playing three seasons (1996–1998) there. In February 2000, the Los Angeles Galaxy selected Utush in the sixth round (71st overall) of the 2000 MLS SuperDraft. The Galaxy released Utush on March 17, during the league's preseason. In April 2000, Utush then signed with the Seattle Sounders of the USL A-League. In June 2000, he was called up by the Colorado Rapids for several games, he played for them in exhibition games, but never came off the bench for an MLS game. In the fall of 2000, Utush moved to SV Ried of Austria. He returned to Seattle in July 2001. On August 23, 2001, the Sounders waived Utush. Aj now coaches for Utush Soccer Academy, “stars” serving as the girls side director. Aj currently coaches two teams.
