= Greg Foisie =

American soccer player

Personal information
- Full name: Greg Michael Foisie
- Date of birth: November 20, 1979 (age 46)
- Place of birth: Tampa, Florida, U.S.
- Height: 1.75 m (5 ft 9 in)
- Position: Forward

Youth career
- 1998–2001: Washington Huskies

Senior career*
Years	Team	Apps	(Gls)
2001	Seattle Sounders Select	11	(5)
2002	Seattle Sounders	10	(0)
Total		21	(5)
- * Club domestic league appearances and goals

Greg Michael Foisie (born November 20, 1979) is an American former soccer player who played one season with Seattle Sounders in the USL A-League.
