= Jose Vasquez (soccer) =

Mexican footballer

Joe Vasquez
Personal information
- Full name: Jose Vasquez
- Date of birth: March 20, 1969 (age 57)
- Place of birth: Jalisco, Mexico
- Height: 6 ft 0 in (1.83 m)
- Positions: Defender; forward

Youth career
- 1989–1990: Santa Ana College

Senior career*
Years	Team	Apps	(Gls)
1991	Guadalajara		
1992	Atlas		
1993–1994	Los Angeles Salsa	35	(0)
1995	Anaheim Splash (indoor)	27	(22)
1996	Los Angeles Galaxy	14	(2)
1997	Orange County Zodiac	11	(2)
1997–1999	Los Angeles Galaxy	13	(4)
1998	→ MLS Pro 40 (loan)	2	(0)
1999–2000	Orange County Zodiac	42	(13)

Managerial career
- 1992–2003: Santa Ana College (assistant)
- 2004–: Santa Ana College
- * Club domestic league appearances and goals

Jose Vasquez (born March 20, 1969) is a Mexican former footballer who played three seasons with the Los Angeles Galaxy.

== Player ==
=== Youth ===
Vasquez graduated from Santa Ana High School and attended Santa Ana College, a two-year, community college in California. He played soccer both years (1989 and 1990). He was inducted into the Santa Ana Athletic Hall of Fame in 2007.

=== Professional ===
In 1991, Vasquez began his professional career with Mexican club C.D. Guadalajara before moving to Club Atlas in 1992. In 1993, he returned to the United States to sign with the Los Angeles Salsa of the American Professional Soccer League. He spent two seasons with the Salsa. In 1995, he played for the Anaheim Splash in the Continental Indoor Soccer League. Vasquez was invited by the Los Angeles Galaxy to attend the team's 1996 pre-season training camp. He impressed the coaching staff and was offered a contract. Vasquez lost much of the season with a broken foot and the Galaxy released him in February 1997. Vasquez moved to the Orange County Zodiac an A-League team associated with the Galaxy. On July 2, 1997, the Galaxy called Vasquez up from the Zodiac. Vasquez played the next two seasons with the Galaxy, briefly going on loan to the MLS Pro 40 in 1998. The Galaxy waived him on April 3, 1999. Vasquez then rejoined the Zodiac for the rest of the season.

== Coach ==
During his playing career, Vasquez also coached high school teams, including Santa Ana High School, Orange High School, Katella High School with success of winning CIF championships in the years of 2006 and 2007 . In 1992, he became an assistant coach at Santa Ana College. In 2004, Vasquez became head coach at Santa Ana. He took the Dons to the top ranking in the nation and was the 2004 junior college Coach of the Year.
