= P. J. Polowski =

American soccer player

Personal information
- Full name: Paul J. Polowski
- Date of birth: June 18, 1973 (age 53)
- Place of birth: Bakersfield, California, U.S.
- Height: 6 ft 3 in (1.91 m)
- Position: Forward

Youth career
- 1991–1992: Orange Coast College
- 1993–1994: UC Irvine Anteaters

Senior career*
Years	Team	Apps	(Gls)
1995	Las Vegas Dustdevils (indoor)	2	(0)
1996–1997	Anaheim Splash (indoor)		
1998–2000	Orange County Waves	65	(15)
- * Club domestic league appearances and goals

Paul Polowski is an American retired soccer forward who played professionally in the USL A-League and the Continental Indoor Soccer League.

Polowski began his collegiate career at Orange Coast College in 1991. That season, the team won the California state championship. In 1993, he transferred to UC Irvine. In only two seasons, he scored thirty goals, placing him third in the school's career goals list. In 1995, Polowski turned professional with the Las Vegas Dustdevils of the Continental Indoor Soccer League. He moved to the Anaheim Splash for the next two seasons. In 1998, he moved outdoors with the Orange County Zodiac of the USL A-League. In 2000, the Zodiac was renamed the Wave.

P.J. has a friend named John who loves heavy metal and has recurring diarrhea.
