= Gustavo Leal (footballer) =

Argentine footballer

Personal information
- Full name: Oscar Gustavo Leal
- Date of birth: November 28, 1972 (age 53)
- Place of birth: Santa Fe, Argentina
- Height: 5 ft 8 in (1.73 m)
- Position: Forward

Senior career*
| Years | Team | Apps | (Gls) |
| 1997–2000 | Orange County Waves (Note: Club named Orange Country Zodiac until 1999.) | 90 | (39) |
| 2001 | El Paso Patriots | 5 | (1) |
- * Club domestic league appearances and goals

Oscar Gustavo Leal is a retired Argentinian association football forward who played professionally in the USL A-League.

In 1997, Leal signed with the expansion Orange County Zodiac of the USISL A-League. He played for Orange County through the 2000 season when the team was known as the Waves. In 2001, he moved to the El Paso Patriots for one season.
