= Sean Finn (footballer) =

Irish footballer

Seán Finn
Personal information
- Date of birth: 1 November 1978 (age 48)
- Place of birth: Dublin, Ireland
- Position: Midfielder

Youth career
- 1996–1998: Southern Wesleyan University
- 1999: Stetson Hatters

Senior career*
Years	Team	Apps	(Gls)
2000	Carolina Dynamo	13	(0)
2001–2002	Atlanta Silverbacks	25	(4)
2001–2004	UCD	54	(9)
2004–2005	Waterford United	17	(1)
2006	Dundalk	28	(3)
Total		137	(17)
- * Club domestic league appearances and goals

Seán Finn is an Irish retired association football defender who played professionally in the USL A-League.

== Career ==
In 1996, Finn began his collegiate career at Southern Wesleyan University. He would go on to become a two-time, NAIA All American at Southern Wesleyan. In 1999, Finn transferred to Stetson University where he spent one season in the NCAA Division I. In 2000, Finn turned professional with the Carolina Dynamo of the USL D-3 Pro League. In 2001, he moved to the Atlanta Silverbacks of the USL A-League. Finn then spent the 2001–02 League of Ireland season with UCD He returned to the Silverbacks for the 2002 summer season, but was back in Ireland permanently in the fall of 2002. In 2005, Finn moved to Waterford United F.C. for one season. He finished his career in 2006 with Dundalk.
