= Greg Simmonds =

Jamaican footballer (born 1975)

Personal information
- Full name: Gregory Simmonds
- Date of birth: 16 December 1975 (age 50)
- Place of birth: Kingston, Jamaica
- Height: 6 ft 4 in (1.93 m)
- Position: Forward

College career
Years	Team	Apps	(Gls)
1995–1998	Howard Bison		

Senior career*
Years	Team	Apps	(Gls)
1999–2000	Hershey Wildcats	51	(32)
2000	→ D.C. United (loan)	0	(0)
2001	Miami Fusion	9	(0)
2002	Rochester Raging Rhinos	26	(6)
2003	Richmond Kickers	27	(4)
2004–2005	Charleston Battery	49	(10)
2006	Virginia Beach Mariners	23	(9)
2007	Puerto Rico Islanders	7	(0)
2008–2009	Richmond United (indoor)	3	(5)
- * Club domestic league appearances and goals

Gregory Simmonds (born 16 December 1975) is a retired Jamaican soccer player who played professionally in the USL First Division.

== Career ==
Simmonds attended Howard University, playing on the men's soccer team from 1995 to 1998. He graduated as the all-time leading scorer for the Bison. In 1999, Simmonds turned professional with the Hershey Wildcats of the USL A-League. He scored sixteen goals that season and was selected as the A-League Rookie of the Year. His scoring touch led to D.C. United calling him up in January 2000 for two games in the 2000 CONCACAF Champions' Cup. He came on for Jaime Moreno in a 17 January 2000 victory over L.D. Alajuelense. Four days later, he started the game with C.F. Pachuca. Simmonds continued his scoring pace for the Wildcats in 2000, adding another sixteen goals to his total. In February 2001, the Miami Fusion selected Simmonds in the fourth round (thirty-eighth) overall of the 2001 MLS SuperDraft. He scored four goals for the Fusion, all in Open Cup games, but never scored in league play. When the Fusion folded following the 2001 season, Simmonds moved to the Rochester Rhinos. In 2003, Simmonds moved to the Richmond Kickers. On 19 February 2004, the Charleston Battery of the USL First Division signed Simmonds. He led the team in scoring in both 2004 and 2005. In 2006, he joined the Virginia Beach Mariners and lead the team with nine goals. He finished his career in 2007 with the Puerto Rico Islanders in 2007. In November 2008, Simmonds joined Richmond United for the Premier Arena Soccer League season. He scored five goals in three games.

== Personal life ==
Simmonds daughter Kameron and son Nicholas Simmonds are both professional footballers and Jamaica internationals.
