= Stoyan Mladenov =

Bulgarian footballer

Stoian Mladenov
Personal information
- Date of birth: 10 February 1975 (age 51)
- Place of birth: Bulgaria
- Height: 5 ft 11 in (1.80 m)
- Position: Midfielder

Senior career*
Years	Team	Apps	(Gls)
1993–1994	Lokomotiv Ruse		
1994–1995	Rakovski Ruse		
1995–1996	Etar		
1996–1997	Nadur Youngsters		(11)
1997	Long Island Rough Riders		
1998–2001	Minnesota Thunder	79	(23)
1999–2000	Cleveland Crunch (indoor)	17	(4)
2001–2003	Rochester Rhinos	65	(14)
2004	LASK Linz	5	(2)
2005	Rochester Rhinos	27	(1)
- * Club domestic league appearances and goals

Stoian Mladenov (first name more frequently transliterated as Stoyan) (Bulgarian: Стоян Младенов) is a retired Bulgarian football (soccer) midfielder who played professionally in Europe and the United States.

== Career ==
In 1993, Mladenov began his career with Lokomotiv Ruse before moving to Rakovski Ruse in 1994 and F.C. Etar in 1995. Mladenov left Bulgaria for Malta in 1996, signing with Nadur Youngsters F.C. He was the 1996-1997 Best Foreign Player as Nadur won the Gozo Football League First Division championship. In 1997, Mladenov moved to the United States and joined the Long Island Rough Riders. He played for their U-23 team that season. He then moved to the Minnesota Thunder early in the 1998 A-League season. He spent three seasons with the Thunder. In 2000, he was named to the First Team All League team. Mladenov also played part of the 1999-2000National Professional Soccer League season with the Cleveland Crunch. On 11 June 2001, the Thunder sent Mladenov to the Rochester Rhinos as part of a three team trade which sent Andrew Restrepo from the Rhinos to the Atlanta Silverbacks and Steve Armas from the Silverbacks to the Thunder. Mladenov played for the Rhinos through the 2003 season. In 2001, he was again named First Team All League. In December 2003, Mladenov signed with LASK Linz of the second division Austrian Football First League. He returned to the Rhinos for the 2005 season.
