= Luis Macias (Mexican footballer) =

Mexican footballer (born 1972)

Personal information
- Full name: Luis Antonio Macias Lozano
- Date of birth: October 26, 1972 (age 54)
- Place of birth: Leon, Mexico
- Height: 5 ft 7 in (1.70 m)
- Positions: Midfielder; forward

Senior career*
| Years | Team | Apps | (Gls) |
| 1996–1999 | Atlético San Francisco | | |
| 2001 | El Paso Patriots | 23 | (12) |
| 2002 | →Zacatepec (loan) | | |
- * Club domestic league appearances and goals

Luis Antonio Macias Lozano is a retired Mexican professional football defender who played in the USL A-League.

== Career ==
From 1996 to 1999, Macias played for Atlético San Francisco in Mexico. In 2001, he moved to the El Paso Patriots in the USL A-League. The Patriots sent Macias on loan to Zacatepec in January 2002.
