= Gilbert Jean-Baptiste =

Haitian footballer and manager (born 1973)

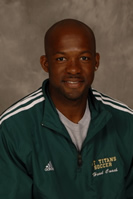

Personal information
- Date of birth: February 19, 1973 (age 53)
- Place of birth: Canada
- Height: 6 ft 0 in (1.83 m)
- Position: Defender

Youth career
- 1995: Mercer County Community College
- 1996–1998: Southern Connecticut State University

Senior career*
Years	Team	Apps	(Gls)
1999–2001	Charleston Battery	79	(6)
2002	Atlanta Silverbacks	28	(3)
Total		107	(9)

International career
2000–2002	Haiti	6	(0)
- * Club domestic league appearances and goals

Gilber Jean-Baptiste (born February 19, 1973) is a former professional footballer who played as a defender. Born in Canada, he earned six caps for the Haiti national team.

== Youth ==
Born in Montreal, Jean-Baptiste grew up in Montreal, Quebec, Canada. In 1995, he moved to the United States to attend Mercer County Community College where he played a single season of college soccer. He was a 1995 NJCAA First Team All American. Jean-Baptiste transferred to Southern Connecticut State University for the next three seasons. In 1998, his senior season, the Owls won the NCAA Division II Men's Soccer Championship and Jean-Baptiste was a First Team Division II All American and the NCAA Division II Player of the Year. He graduated with a bachelor's degree in computer science.

== Club ==
In 1999, Jean-Baptiste turned professional with the Charleston Battery of the USL A-League. He was named Second Team All League his rookie season. He was also a 2001 First Team All League defender. On February 28, 2002, Jean-Baptiste signed with the Atlanta Silverbacks. He retired at the end of the 2002 season and entered coaching.

== International ==
In 2000, Jean-Baptiste earned his first cap with the Haiti national football team in a 1–1 tie with Peru in the 2000 CONCACAF Gold Cup. He went on to earn six caps, his last coming in 2002.

== Career ==
Currently, Jean-Baptiste is a Computer Science teacher at Atlanta International School.
