= Hershey Wildcats =

Defunct association football club in the US

- Full name: Hershey Wildcats
- Nickname: Wildcats
- Founded: 1997
- Dissolved: 2001
- Stadium: Hersheypark Stadium; Hershey, Pennsylvania
- Capacity: 15,641
- Owner: Hershey Entertainment & Resorts Company (HE&R)
- Coach: (United States) Bob Lilley
- League: USL A-League
Home colors	Away colors

Hershey Wildcats were a professional soccer team, based in Hershey, Pennsylvania, United States, that played in the USL A-League between 1997 and 2001. The team was owned by Hershey Entertainment and Resorts Company. The team played in Hersheypark Stadium, located at Hersheypark, and received its name from the Wild Cat roller coaster. In the Wildcats' 5-year history, the average attendance was 3,189 per game.

== History ==
The Wildcats were moderately successful in their short existence, with Bob Lilley coaching the team for its entire five-year run, leading the Wildcats to the playoffs in each season. In 2001, Hershey reached the A-League finals but were defeated 2–0 by the Rochester Raging Rhinos.

Less than a week after the championship match, in October 2001, Hershey Entertainment announced that the Wildcats were folding. Weak attendance, including a crowd of only 750 for the 2001 playoff semifinal, was a factor in the decision to fold the team. With the league unable to find a new owner for the club, the players became free agents.

Notable players that played for the Wildcats and then went on to play in Major League Soccer or other professional leagues include Jon Busch and Christof Lindenmayer.

== Year-by-year ==
Year	Division	League	Reg. season	Playoffs	Open Cup	Avg. attendance
1997	2	USISL A-League	1st, Atlantic	Division Semifinals	Round of 16	3,138
1998	2	USISL A-League	2nd, Atlantic	Conference Semifinals	2nd Round	3,794
1999	2	USL A-League	1st, Atlantic	Conference Semifinals	Did not qualify	3,978
2000	2	USL A-League	3rd, Atlantic	Conference Quarterfinals	Did not qualify	2,214
2001	2	USL A-League	1st, Northern	Final	3rd Round	2,911

== See also ==
- D.C. United
