= Minnesota Thunder =

- Full name: Minnesota Thunder
- Nickname(s): Thunder
- Founded: 1990
- Dissolved: 2009
- Stadium: National Sports Center; Blaine, Minnesota
- Capacity: 12,000
- League: USL First Division
- 2009: Regular season: 8th Playoffs: DNQ
Home colors	Away colors

Minnesota Thunder was an American professional soccer team based in Minnesota, United States. Founded in 1990, the team played in the USL First Division (USL-1), the second tier of the American Soccer Pyramid, until 2009.

The team played its home games at the National Sports Center in nearby Blaine, Minnesota for its final two seasons. The team's colors were navy blue, light blue, silver, and white.

The team had a development team, Rochester Thunder, which independently played in USL Premier Development League for another season after the Thunder folded, and a sister organization, the Minnesota Lightning, which played in the women's USL W-League.

== History ==
=== Before the Thunder ===
Prior to the Minnesota Thunder forming in 1990 Minnesota had two former professional soccer teams. After two seasons as the Denver Dynamos the franchise was purchased by Minnesota investors and became the Minnesota Kicks. The Minnesota Kicks played the state's first professional soccer game in May 1976 to a crowd of over 20,000 at Metropolitan Stadium. The team survived for six seasons competing in the North American Soccer League before folding after the 1981 season. After two years without a team the Fort Lauderdale Strikers were moved to Minnesota becoming the Minnesota Strikers in 1984. The team played one season in the NASL before transferring to the Major Indoor Soccer League. The team disbanded in 1988 after the 1987–1988 season.

=== Independent era (1990–1993) ===
The team was founded as an all star team in 1990. The team was composed of top amateur and former professional players who were mostly in their late 20s or early 30s. The team was coached by then Saint Paul Academy soccer coach Buzz Lagos. The team scheduled five exhibition games against teams in the A-League. At the time the goal was to eventually get a semipro soccer team for the Twin Cities.

The Thunder operated on a budget of $35,000 in their first year paying no salaries. The budget mainly supported stadium rental at the National Sports Center, office rental and promotions. In the first season the team played against the amateur Madison 56ers, professional San Francisco Bay Blackhawks and Winnipeg Fury and the indoor professional Chicago Power and Milwaukee Wave. Attendance averaged around 1,000 fans a game.

In the first season the team lost around $12,000. The next year, 1991, with the help of corporate sponsors Rainbow Foods, Kemps, and Liberty State Bank, the team played an expanded schedule with a record of eight victories and three ties losing $10,000 in the process. The following year the team added four more corporate sponsors and expected to lose about $5,000 with a budget of $45,000 By their third season the team became a model for teams in Chicago, Milwaukee, Madison, and Canada due to their competitive schedule, reasonable budget and fan base. As an amateur team, the Thunder was responsible for an opponent's hotel, food and lodging for each road trip. The team was undefeated through their first twenty games.

=== Buzz Lagos era (1994–2005) ===
On November 13, 1993 the Thunder announced its intention to join the U.S. Interregional Soccer League. The team joined the Midwest Region and retained their amateur status for the 1994 season. The team finished the year 25–2 losing in a sudden-death shootout to the Greensboro Dynamo in the championship game. The team became professional for the 1995 season.

On July 15, 2004 coach Buzz Lagos earned his 300th victory. It was his 123rd since the Thunder joined the A-League in 1997. Lagos improved his record to 300–127–31 all-time as coach of the Thunder. Five days later Lagos led the Thunder to their first victory over a MLS team in a nonexhibtion game. The Thunder defeated the Los Angeles Galaxy in fourth round U.S. Open Cup game played to 5,505 fans at the Metrodome. The 2004 season holds the highest average attendance with 4,400 over 14 home games.

Amos Magee played for the Thunder for 12 seasons, retired in 2005, is its all-time leading scorer (64 goals and 39 assists), and was inducted into the USL Hall of Fame in 2008. He was named first-team all-league in 1998, and A-League Championship MVP in 1999. He was inducted into the Minnesota Thunder Hall of Fame.

The 2005 season brought many changes to the Thunder. The Thunder's A-League and the lower Pro Soccer League were reorganized. The Thunder were placed in the twelve team First Division which previously had sixteen teams. Additionally, the team was sold to an ownership led by majority owner Saeed Kadkhodaian. These changes led to Buzz Lagos announcing on August 1, 2005 that he would retire as coach after sixteen season. Lagos cited wanting to spend more time with his family as the main reason to retiring. On October 12, 2005, Amos Magee became the second head coach in the history of the Thunder. The Thunder also purchased a W-League team in 2005. The team was eventually named the Minnesota Lightning in 2006 before their opening season. 2005 was the only season the Thunder turned a profit, making $6,000 which was immediately paid in taxes to the state of Minnesota.

The Thunder defeated four MLS teams over the course of the 2004 and 2005 U.S. Open Cup competitions.

=== Final years (2005–2009) ===
Beginning in August 2007 the team spent $400,000 on a beer garden called the Thunder Lounge and started the Minnesota Thunder Academy. The team also founded the Rochester Thunder in the Premier Development League.

Magee resigned as Thunder manager on July 22, 2008, halfway through the 2008 season.

In November 2009 the Thunder announced their intent to leave the USL First Division to become the co-founders of a new North American Soccer League.

Minnesota's participation in this new league was, however, not to be. In early November 2009 they released all players from their contracts, partly in response to heavy debts and unpaid bills, including wages. The organization was operating with a skeleton staff of 3 people as they tried to reorganize in their final days.

In January 2010, the National Sports Center announced the formation of a new club, the NSC Minnesota Stars that functioned as a replacement for the Thunder.

== Colors and badge ==
A new logo using the colors of navy blue, light blue, and silver was unveiled for the 2008 season. The identity was designed by the Minneapolis design firm Capsule.

The previous Thunder badge incorporated the logo of a capital 'T' and an active soccer ball on a shield reading "Minnesota Thunder". When on the team uniform, it also is adorned atop by a gold star commemorating the 1999 championship season.

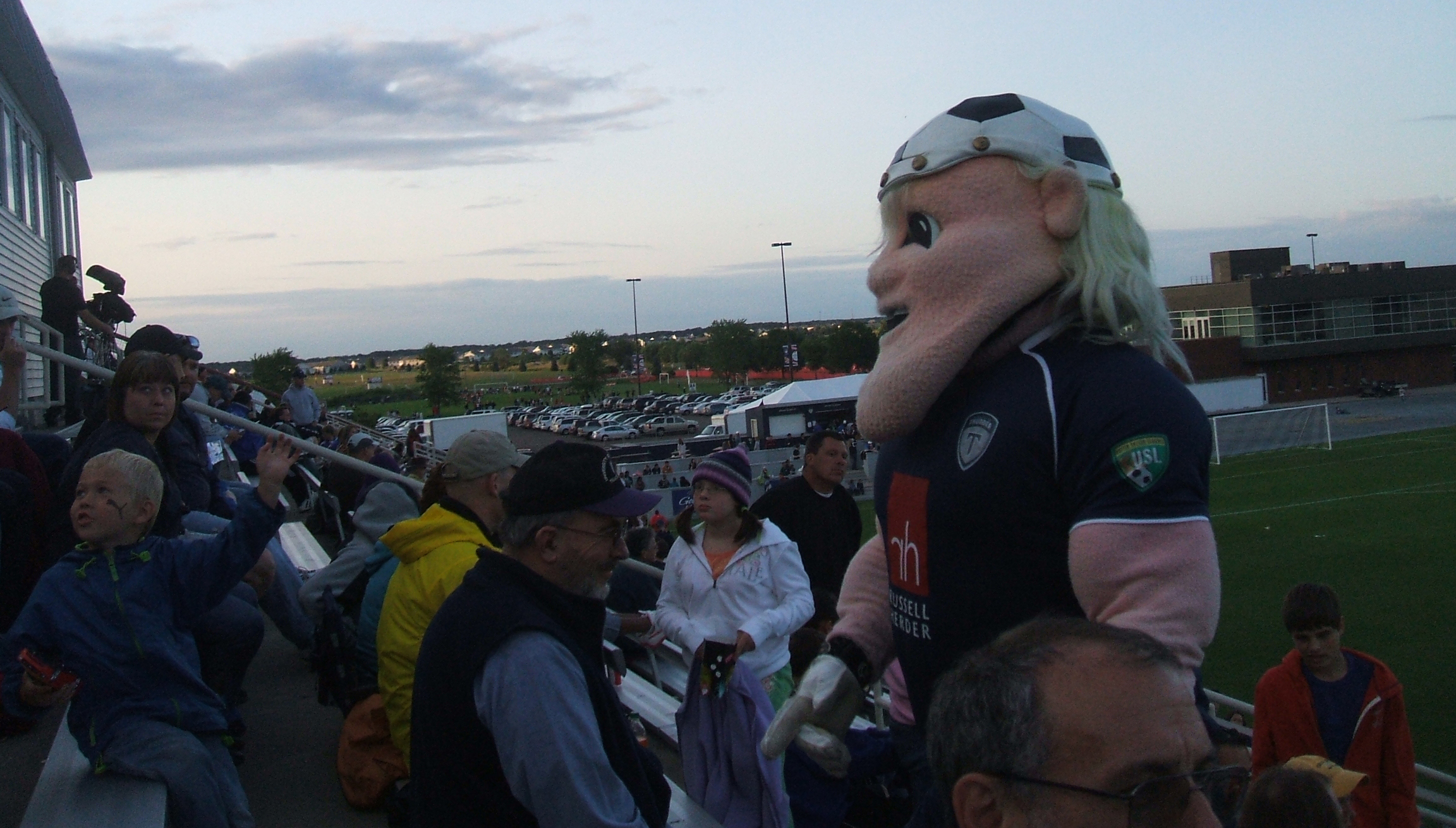
Thor entertains the crowd during halftime.

The initial Thunder crest was a soccer ball with a thunderbolt crossing it followed by the text "Minnesota Thunder".

When the team became a professional organization, a new logo was created, consisting of an image of the state of Minnesota background with a soccer ball and thunderbolt imposed upon it.

In 2002, the Thunder undertook a marketing re-branding endeavor, where a new logo was created consisting of a soccer ball with movement lines and a T below the words of team's name.

In 2006, a new navy and gold "shield" logo was created by the Minneapolis design firm CAPSULE.

The official mascot of the Minnesota Thunder was Thor.

== Stadiums ==
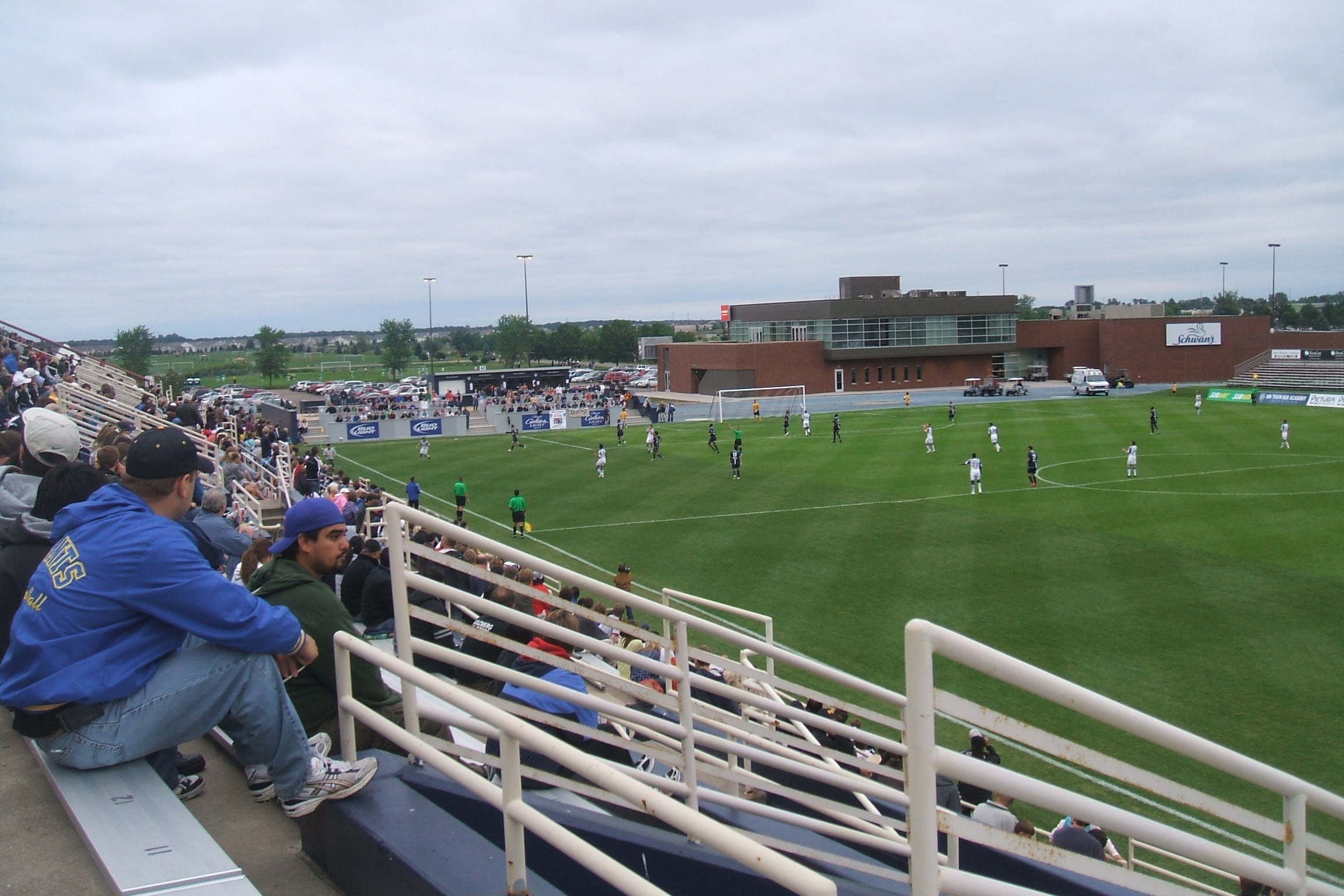
The Thunder host the Kansas City Wizards at the National Sports Center.

- National Sports Center; Blaine, Minnesota (1990–2003, 2008–2009)
- James Griffin Stadium; St. Paul, Minnesota (2004–2007)
- Hubert H. Humphrey Metrodome; Minneapolis, Minnesota 2 games (2004–2005)
- Macalester Stadium at Macalester College; St. Paul, Minnesota 1 game (2004)
- Stadium at Stillwater High School; Oak Park Heights, Minnesota 1 game (2004)

The Thunder's first home field was the National Sports Center in Blaine, Minnesota where they played until 2003. In 2003 the Thunder wanted to reduce the number of home games played at the National Sports Center to seven. The Minnesota Amateur Sports Commission which owns the National Sports Center was not comfortable with the idea so the Thunder decided to look elsewhere. Their three-year lease expired in 2003 leaving them open to search for other facilities for 2004. At the time revenue from the Thunder accounted for less than one percent of the National Sports Center's total revenue. Barclay Kruse, the associate director of the Minnesota Amateur Sports Commission described the situation as, "The best way to describe it is that we're disappointed."

In 2004 the Thunder played home matches at James Griffin Stadium, also known as "The Jimmy", in St Paul. The move to this stadium in central Saint Paul was made in an attempt to reduce overhead costs and market to a more urban and ethnic crowd. According to then president and general manager Jim Froslid some of the deciding were being on a bus line (mass transit does not go to Blaine) and being accessible to the ethnic community. Fan surveys indicated that they would attend more games if the Thunder played in a more central location.

On May 12, 2008, they returned to the National Sports Center with a lease until 2011. At the time the Thunder was the only team in the USL to not play in a soccer specific stadium and the only team that played on with painted American football lines.

The Metrodome was occasionally used as a home field. Macalester Stadium at Macalester College in St. Paul was also used for games in the past. While playing at the National Sports Center the Thunder traditionally played several games a year in other locations notably Macalester College or Eastview High School in Apple Valley.

== Supporters ==
The team's largest supporters' group, the Dark Clouds, were founded in 2004 and worked with the Thunder organization to make improvements to their home stadium. After the Thunder folded, the group supported the NSC Minnesota Stars and Minnesota United FC—including its later MLS incarnation.

== Players ==
=== Final roster ===
Note: Flags indicate national team as defined under FIFA eligibility rules; some limited exceptions apply. Players may hold more than one non-FIFA nationality.

No.	Pos.	Nation	Player
1	GK	(United States) USA	Matt Van Oekel
2	MF	(Liberia) LBR	Melvin Tarley
3	DF	(Canada) CAN	Andres Arango
4	DF	(United States) USA	Andrew Peterson
6	MF	(United States) USA	Kevin Friedland
7	MF	(United States) USA	Dale Weiler
8	MF	(France) FRA	Youssouf Kanté
9	FW	(New Zealand) NZL	Nathan Knox
11	DF	(United States) USA	Rich Costanzo
12	GK	(United States) USA	Nicolas Platter
13	MF	(Kenya) KEN	Lawrence Olum
14	DF	(United States) USA	Chris Clements

No.	Pos.	Nation	Player
15	MF	(Russia) RUS	Rod Dyachenko
16	DF	(United States) USA	Marcus Watson
17	FW	(Haiti) HAI	Leonel Saint-Preux
18	FW	(United States) USA	Dan O'Brien
19	DF	(United States) USA	Brian Kallman
20	MF	(United States) USA	Brian Cvilikas
21	FW	(Liberia) LBR	Geoffrey Myers
22	MF	(United States) USA	Jeremiah Bass (captain)
23	FW	(Canada) CAN	Marco Terminesi
25	MF	(Belarus) BLR	Andrei Gotsmanov
28	DF	(South Africa) RSA	Jonathan Greenfield

=== Hall of Fame ===
The following people have been inducted into the Minnesota Thunder Hall of Fame:

- Tony Pesznecker Inducted 1996
- Tony Sanneh Inducted 1996
- Manuel Lagos Inducted 1996
- John Swallen Inducted 2002
- Gerard Lagos Inducted 2002
- Tom Engstrom Inducted 2003
- Don Gramenz Inducted 2004
- Buzz Lagos Inducted 2005
- Amos Magee Inducted 2005
- Bill George Inducted 2006

== Year-by-year ==
Year	Division	League	Reg. season	Playoffs	Open Cup	Avg. attendance
1994	2	USISL	1st, Midwest	Final	did not enter	—
1995	2	USISL Pro League	1st, Midwest East	Final	did not qualify	—
1996	2	USISL Select League	2nd, Central	Semifinals	did not qualify	—
1997	2	USISL A-League	5th, Central	did not qualify	did not qualify	3,852
1998	2	USISL A-League	2nd, Central	Final	did not qualify	3,543
1999	2	USL A-League	1st, Central	Champion	2nd Round	3,126
2000	2	USL A-League	1st, Central	Final	3rd Round	3,588
2001	2	USL A-League	6th, Western	did not qualify	did not qualify	3,512
2002	2	USL A-League	2nd, Central	Conference Semifinals	3rd Round	3,862
2003	2	USL A-League	2nd, Central	Final	3rd Round	4,101
2004	2	USL A-League	3rd, Western	Quarterfinals	Quarterfinals	2,961
2005	2	USL First Division	10th	did not qualify	Semifinals	3,135
2006	2	USL First Division	12th	did not qualify	2nd Round	2,925
2007	2	USL First Division	11th	did not qualify	2nd Round	3,151
2008	2	USL First Division	7th	Quarterfinals	2nd Round	3,573
2009	2	USL First Division	8th	did not qualify	3rd Round	3,209

== Honors ==
- USL A-League
  - Winners (1): 1999
  - Runners-up (3): 1998, 2000, 2003
  - Midwest Division champions (1): 1994*
  - Midwest East Division champions (1): 1995*
  - Central Division champions (2): 1999, 2000
- U.S. Open Cup
  - Semifinals (1): 2005
  - Quarterfinals (1): 2004
- USISL Sizzling Nine Championship
  - Runners-up (2): 1994, 1995

== Head coaches ==
- (United States) Buzz Lagos (1990–2005)
- (United States) Amos Magee (2006–2008)
- (United States) Don Gramenz (2008–2009)
