= 2000 Columbus Crew season =

Columbus Crew
2000 season
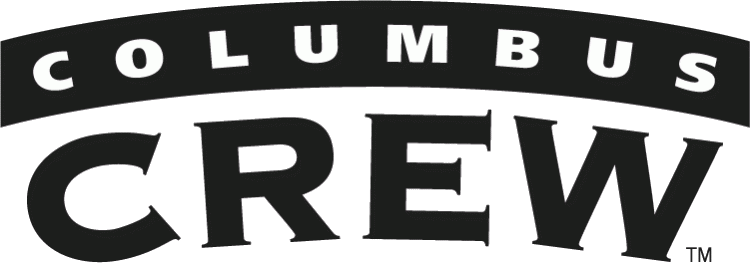
- Investor-operators: Lamar Hunt; Clark Hunt; Dan Hunt; Lamar Hunt Jr. Sharron Hunt Munson; Ron Pizzuti and a group of local investors
- Head Coach: Tom Fitzgerald
- Stadium: Columbus Crew Stadium
- Major League Soccer: Division: 4th Overall: 10th
- MLS Cup playoffs: Did not qualify
- U.S. Open Cup: Quarterfinals
- Top goalscorer: League: Dante Washington (15); All: Dante Washington (15)
- Highest home attendance: 24,741 (5/15 v. NE)
- Lowest home attendance: 3,297 (7/19 v. HAM)
- Average home league attendance: 15,451 (68.5%)
- Biggest win: CLB 4–1 NEW (7/12); CLB 4–1 HAM (7/19)
- Biggest defeat: TAM 5–1 CLB (3/18)
Home colors	Away colors

The 2000 Columbus Crew season was the club's fifth season of existence and their fifth consecutive season in Major League Soccer, the top flight of soccer in the United States. The first match of the season was on March 18 against Tampa Bay Mutiny. It was the fifth season under head coach Tom Fitzgerald. The Crew's USL A-League affiliates this season were Cincinnati Riverhawks, Indiana Blast, Milwaukee Rampage, Pittsburgh Riverhounds and Rochester Raging Rhinos.

== Roster ==
As of August 9, 2000

Note: Flags indicate national team as defined under FIFA eligibility rules; some limited exceptions apply. Players may hold more than one non-FIFA nationality.

No.	Pos.	Nation	Player
1	GK	USA	Mark Dougherty
2	DF	USA	Mike Lapper (captain)
3	DF	USA	Mike Clark (captain)
4	DF	ARG	Mario Gori
5	DF	USA	Matt Chulis
6	MF	USA	Todd Yeagley
7	MF	BOL	Roland Vargas-Aguilera
8	MF	USA	Miles Joseph
9	FW	USA	Dante Washington
10	MF	USA	Brian Maisonneuve
11	FW	USA	Jeff Cunningham

No.	Pos.	Nation	Player
12	MF	USA	Jason Farrell
13	DF	TRI	Ancil Elcock
14	MF	COL	John Wilmar Pérez
15	DF	USA	Mike Duhaney
16	MF	USA	Steve Armas
17	FW	USA	Brian West
18	GK	USA	Matt Napoleon
19	MF	POL	Robert Warzycha
20	FW	USA	Brian McBride
21	MF	USA	Mario Longo
22	DF	USA	Dominic Schell
23	DF	POL	Mirosław Rzepa
24	MF	USA	John DeBrito
33	GK	USA	Matthew Nelson (on loan Cape Cod Crusaders)

== Technical Staff ==
Position	Staff
General Manager	(United States) Jim Smith
Head Coach	(United States) Tom Fitzgerald
Assistant Coach	(United States) Greg Andrulis
Assistant Coach	(Argentina) Marcelo Carrera
Assistant Coach/Scout	(United States) Nick Roberts
Head Trainer	(United States) Amy Baer
Team Manager	(United States) Mark De Feyter

== Non-competitive ==
=== Preseason ===
Columbus brought multiple non-roster invitees to preseason camp. These included Steve Armas and Mario Longo who later signed contracts with the Crew. It also included Joenal Castma, Phil Karn, Gerardo Reinoso, Horacio Melgarejo, Ian Checcio, and Nikoli who did not sign with the team.

February 7 Friendly	Columbus Crew	2-0	FIU Panthers	Boca Raton, FL
		Report		Stadium: Lynn University

February 9 Friendly	Columbus Crew	5-0	U.S. U-20 National Team	Boca Raton, FL
10:00 AM EST		Report		Stadium: Lynn University

February 10 MLS Spring Training	Columbus Crew	1-1 (a.e.t.)	San Jose Earthquakes	Fort Lauderdale, FL
6:00 PM EST	Warzycha 6' (pen.); Schell (yellow card) 65'; Chulis (yellow card) 79'	Report	Krakowiak 62'	Stadium: Lockhart Stadium; Referee: Noel Kenny; Assistant referees: Tim Weyland; Tom Bobadilla

February 12 Friendly	Columbus Crew	2-0	Lynn Fighting Knights	Boca Raton, FL
10:00 AM EST		Report		Stadium: Lynn University

February 14 MLS Spring Training	Columbus Crew	0-1 (a.e.t.)	NY/NJ MetroStars	Fort Lauderdale, FL
8:00 PM EST	Clark (red card) 42'; Jason Farrell (yellow card) 57'; Lapper (yellow card) 73'	Report	Shak (yellow card) 21'; Semioli (yellow card) 42'; Dooley (red card) 66'; Kelly 95'	Stadium: Lockhart Stadium; Referee: Kermit Quisenberry; Assistant referees: Richard Eddy; Robbie Mann

February 15 Friendly	Columbus Crew	1-1	Tampa Bay Mutiny	Boca Raton, FL
		Report		Stadium: Lynn University

February 16 MLS Spring Training 9th Place Game	Columbus Crew	1-1 (a.e.t.)	San Jose Earthquakes	Fort Lauderdale, FL
8:00 PM EST	Cannon 28' (o.g.); Lapper (yellow card) 31'; Armas (yellow card) 78'	Report	Rodriguez 7'; Barrett (yellow card) 24'; Clark (yellow card) 70'	Stadium: Lockhart Stadium; Referee: Tim Weyland; Assistant referees: Greg Barkey; George Vergara

February 21 Friendly	Columbus Crew	7-2	South Carolina Gamecocks	Sanford, FL
		Report		Stadium: Seminole Training Complex

February 21 Friendly	Columbus Crew	6-2	Rollins Tars	Sanford, FL
		Report		Stadium: Seminole Training Complex

February 22 Friendly	Columbus Crew	1-0	UCF Golden Knights	Sanford, FL
	McBride	Report		Stadium: Seminole Training Complex

February 23 Friendly	Columbus Crew	6-0	Bermuda National Team	Sanford, FL
	McBride,, West; Washington; Vargas-Aguilera	Report		Stadium: Seminole Training Complex

February 24 Friendly	Columbus Crew	Cancelled	F.C. Viberg	Sanford, FL
		Report		Stadium: Seminole Training Complex

February 25 Friendly	Columbus Crew	1-1	South Florida Bulls	Sanford, FL
	Clark	Report		Stadium: Seminole Training Complex

February 26 Friendly	Columbus Crew	8-2	Charlotte 49ers	Sanford, FL
3:00 PM EST	Clark 7'; Warzycha 22'; McBride 35', 43'; Vargas-Aguilera 62', 76'; Lindenmayer 86'; Washington 89'	Report	Goal	Stadium: Seminole Training Complex

February 27 Friendly	Columbus Crew	3-0	Florida Southern Moccasins	Sanford, FL
	Warzycha 4'; McBride 37'; Karn 73'	Report		Stadium: Seminole Training Complex

March 4 Friendly	Columbus Crew	4-0	Maryland Terrapins	Obetz, OH
	Washington, McBride; Warzycha	Report		Stadium: Crew Training Center

March 12 Friendly	Kansas City Wizards	2-3	Columbus Crew	St. Louis, MO
	Klein (yellow card) 1'; McKeon 14'; Brown 65'	Report	Elcock (yellow card) 27'; Gori 42', 45', 46', (yellow card) 70'; Chulis (yellow card) 88'	Stadium: Hermann Stadium

March 14 Friendly	Columbus Crew	8-0	West Virginia Mountaineers	Obetz, OH
	McBride 10', 23'; Clark 30'; Warzycha 37'; West 53', 85'; Vargas-Aguilera 61'; Schell 89'	Report		Stadium: Crew Training Center

=== Midseason ===
The Crew played a variety of friendly matches during the regular season. They invited non-rostered players Chuck Browder to play against Kansas City Wizards and Chumski Momose to play against Pittsburgh Riverhounds.

March 21 Keith Evans Memorial Match	Columbus Crew	8-1	Dayton Gems	Obetz, OH
7:00 PM EST	McBride 10'; Washington 27', 34', 44'; Warzycha 47+'; DeBrito 48'; Farrell 69'; Smith 84'	Report	Garrambone 78'	Stadium: Crew Training Center

March 27 Friendly	Columbus Crew	4-0	Xavier Musketeers	Obetz, OH
	Farrell 16'; Hitzeman 34' (o.g.); Dougherty 77'; Pérez 80'	Report		Stadium: Crew Training Center

April 18 Friendly	Columbus Crew	3-0	Akron Zips	Obetz, OH
	Washington 1'; Vargas-Aguilera 22'; Gori (yellow card) 78', (goal) 89'	Report	Marich (yellow card) 71'	Stadium: Crew Training Center

April 25 Friendly	Cincinnati Riverhawks	0-2	Columbus Crew	Kings Mills, OH
7:30 PM EDT	Cunningham 10'; Gori 83'; Schell (yellow card) 89'	Report	Milojevich (yellow card) 52'; Callahan (yellow card) 59'	Stadium: Galbreath Field; Attendance: 2,000

May 10 Dayton Cup	Columbus Crew	0-2	Kansas City Wizards	Washington Township, OH
7:30 PM EDT	Vargas-Aguilera (yellow card) 56'	Report	Brown (yellow card) 35'; Glasgow 41'; Johnson 45'; Garcia (yellow card) 49'	Stadium: Centerville Soccer Stadium; Attendance: 2,000; Referee: Sergio Vega; Assistant referees: Mikael Lundqvist; Hilario Grajeda; Fourth official: Matthew Bole

May 24 Friendly	Columbus Crew	4-1	Hamburger SV	Columbus, OH
	Washington 6'; Clark 23'; Warzycha (yellow card) 32'; Elcock 53'; Gori 56'	Report	Hoogma 9'; Hertzsch (yellow card) 32'	Stadium: Columbus Crew Stadium

June 21 Friendly	Pittsburgh Riverhounds	1-1	Columbus Crew	Bethel Park, PA
7:35 PM EDT	Bonseu 35' (pen.)	Report	Pérez	Stadium: Bethel Park Stadium; Attendance: 5,011

July 26 Friendly	Columbus Crew	2-2	Newcastle United F.C.	Columbus, OH
7:30 PM EDT	Chulis (yellow card) 1'; Joseph 67'; Cunningham 84'	Report	Speed (yellow card) 57'; Cort 32', 84'	Stadium: Columbus Crew Stadium

== Competitive ==
=== Overview ===
Competition	First match	Last match	Starting round	Final position	Record							
Competition	First match	Last match	Starting round	Final position	Pld	W	D	L	GF	GA	GD	Win %
Major League Soccer	March 18, 2000	September 9, 2000	Matchday 1	10th	32	11	5	16	48	58	−10	34.38
U.S. Open Cup	June 14, 2000	August 9, 2000	Second Round	Quarterfinals	3	2	1	0	7	2	+5	66.67
Total					35	13	6	16	55	60	−5	37.14

Source: Competitions

=== MLS ===
==== Standings ====
===== Central Division =====
Pos	Team	Pld	W	L	T	GF	GA	GD	Pts	Qualification
1	Chicago Fire	32	17	9	6	67	51	+16	57	MLS Cup Playoffs
2	Tampa Bay Mutiny	32	16	12	4	62	50	+12	52	MLS Cup Playoffs
3	Dallas Burn	32	14	14	4	54	54	0	46	MLS Cup Playoffs
4	Columbus Crew	32	11	16	5	48	58	−10	38	

Source: MLS

===== Overall table =====
Pos	Team	Pld	W	L	T	GF	GA	GD	Pts
8	Colorado Rapids	32	13	15	4	43	59	−16	43
9	Miami Fusion	32	12	15	5	54	56	−2	41
10	Columbus Crew	32	11	16	5	48	58	−10	38
11	D.C. United	32	8	18	6	44	63	−19	30
12	San Jose Earthquakes	32	7	17	8	35	50	−15	29

Source: MLS
Rules for classification: 1) points; 2) head-to-head record; 3) goal difference; 4) number of goals scored

==== Results summary ====
Overall								Home						Away					
Pld	Pts	W	L	T	GF	GA	GD	W	L	T	GF	GA	GD	W	L	T	GF	GA	GD
32	38	11	16	5	48	58	−10	7	6	3	29	25	+4	4	10	2	19	33	−14

Source: MLS standings
Pld = Matches played; Pts = Points; W = Matches won; T = Matches tied; L = Matches lost; GF = Goals for; GA = Goals against; GD = Goal difference

==== Results by round ====
Round	1	2	3	4	5	6	7	8	9	10	11	12	13	14	15	16	17	18	19	20	21	22	23	24	25	26	27	28	29	30	31	32
Stadium	A	H	H	H	A	H	A	A	H	A	H	A	H	A	H	A	H	H	H	A	A	H	H	A	A	A	H	A	H	A	A	H
Result	L	W	L	T	W	L	L	W	L	L	W	W	T	L	T	T	W	L	W	L	L	W	W	L	W	T	W	L	L	L	L	L

Source: schedule
A = Away; H = Home; W = Win; L = Loss; T = Tie

==== Match results ====
March 18 1	Tampa Bay Mutiny	5-1	Columbus Crew	Tampa, FL
7:00 PM EST	Arce 24', 78'; Lagos 29'; Ralston 33', 76'; Keller (yellow card) 49'; Kotschau (yellow card) 68'; Kinnear (yellow card) 73'	Report	Gori (yellow card) 24'; Washington 39'; Warzycha (yellow card) 50'	Stadium: Raymond James Stadium; Attendance: 11,779; Referee: Kevin Stott; Assistant referees: Roger Itaya; George Vergara; Fourth official: Robert Thunelius

March 25 2	Columbus Crew	2-1 (a.e.t.)	San Jose Earthquakes	Columbus, OH
7:30 PM EST	DeBrito (yellow card) 15'; West 85'; Warzycha 100'	Report	Wright (yellow card) 25'; Cerritos 90+2' (pen.)	Stadium: Columbus Crew Stadium; Attendance: 16,095; Referee: Ali Saheli; Assistant referees: Roger Itaya; Terry Vaughn; Fourth official: Douglas Palomaki

April 1 3	Columbus Crew	0-2	Chicago Fire	Columbus, OH
7:30 PM EST	Lapper (yellow card) 52'; West (yellow card) 60'	Report	Razov 5'; Kubík (yellow card) 25'; Kovalenko (yellow card) 26'; Armas (yellow card) 33'; Nowak 36'; Gutiérrez (red card) 87'	Stadium: Columbus Crew Stadium; Attendance: 12,952; Referee: Sandra Hunt; Assistant referees: Richard Huber; George Gansner; Fourth official: Mikael Lundqvist

April 8 4	Columbus Crew	2-2 (a.e.t.)	Los Angeles Galaxy	Columbus, OH
7:30 PM EDT	Washington 15', 66'; Warzycha (yellow card) 22'; Duhaney (yellow card) 48'	Report	Hendrickson 18'; Mathis 87'; Jones (yellow card) 92'	Stadium: Columbus Crew Stadium; Attendance: 10,797; Referee: Marcel Yonan; Assistant referees: Nate Clement; Robbie Mann; Fourth official: J.R. Perdue

April 15 5	NY/NJ MetroStars	0-1	Columbus Crew	East Rutherford, NJ
7:30 PM EDT		Report	McBride 84'	Stadium: Giants Stadium; Attendance: 12,399; Referee: Paul Tamberino; Assistant referees: Craig Lowry; Bill Dittmar; Fourth official: Jorge De La Bandera

April 22 6	Columbus Crew	2-3	Colorado Rapids	Columbus, OH
7:30 PM EDT	Washington 6', 80'; Warzycha (red card) 21'; McBride (yellow card) 49'; Elcock (yellow card) 62'; Clark (yellow card) 78'	Report	Valdés 10', (yellow card) 86'; Balboa 55'; Agogo 60'; Key (yellow card) 83'	Stadium: Columbus Crew Stadium; Attendance: 12,295; Referee: Rich Grady; Assistant referees: Glenn Prechac; Reggie Rutty; Fourth official: Douglas Palomaki

April 29 7	Dallas Burn	2-1	Columbus Crew	Dallas, TX
8:00 PM EDT	Pareja 13', (yellow card) 35'; Broome (yellow card) 26'; Graziani 37'; Iribarren (yellow card) 52'; Deering (yellow card) 85'	Report	Washington 24'; Gori (yellow card) 45'; Elcock (yellow card) 54'; DeBrito (yellow card) 58'; Chulis (yellow card) 58'	Stadium: Cotton Bowl; Attendance: 15,277; Referee: Ali Saheli; Assistant referees: Craig Lowry; Richard Eddy; Fourth official: Bozorgmehr Reza Namavar

May 3 8	D.C. United	1-2	Columbus Crew	Washington, D.C.
7:30 PM EDT	Albright (yellow card) 11'; Talley 59'	Report	West (yellow card) 8'; Warzycha 52'; Clark (yellow card) 59'; Williams 88' (o.g.)	Stadium: Robert F. Kennedy Memorial Stadium; Attendance: 11,872; Referee: Tim Weyland; Assistant referees: Greg Barkey; Rob Fereday; Fourth official: Lorenzo Sanz

May 6 9	Columbus Crew	0-2	NY/NJ MetroStars	Columbus, OH
7:30 PM EDT	Duhaney (yellow card) 58'; DeBrito (yellow card) 78'	Report	Valencia 60', 69'; Matthäus (yellow card) 78'; Jolley (yellow card) 78'	Stadium: Columbus Crew Stadium; Attendance: 17,558; Referee: Paul Tamberino; Assistant referees: Craig Lowry; John Spicer-Escalante; Fourth official: Douglas Palomaki

May 13 10	Tampa Bay Mutiny	3-1	Columbus Crew	Tampa, FL
7:00 PM EDT	Diallo 11', 38'; Kinnear 48'; Addo (yellow card) 74'	Report	Warzycha 74'; Yeagley (yellow card) 81'	Stadium: Raymond James Stadium; Attendance: 10,212; Referee: Kevin Terry; Assistant referees: Scott Weyland; Tarek Khan; Fourth official: Dax Unterreiner

May 20 11	Columbus Crew	2-1	Dallas Burn	Columbus, OH
7:30 PM EDT	Washington 10'; Clark (yellow card) 40'; Pérez (yellow card) 58'; West 61'; Cunningham (yellow card) 84'	Report	Eck (yellow card) 38'; Kreis (yellow card) 53', (goal) 71'; Dade (yellow card) 89'; Farrer (yellow card) 90+2'	Stadium: Columbus Crew Stadium; Attendance: 13,548; Referee: Brian Hall; Assistant referees: Cory Dean; Paul Scott; Fourth official: Mikael Lundqvist

May 27 12	Miami Fusion F.C.	2-4	Columbus Crew	Fort Lauderdale, FL
7:30 PM EDT	Mastroeni (yellow card) 23' (yellow-red card) 79'; Machón 25'; Gutierrez (yellow card) 38'; Rooney 53'; Cullen (yellow card) 61'	Report	Joseph (yellow card) 11'; Washington (yellow card) 11', (goal) 48', 89'; McBride 13', 27'; Yeagley (yellow card) 56'; Warzycha (yellow card) 85'; DeBrito (yellow card) 88'; Gori (yellow card) 90+4'	Stadium: Lockhart Stadium; Attendance: 7,308; Referee: Rich Grady; Assistant referees: Sharon Wheeler; Peter Kokolski; Fourth official: Adam Nemhe

June 3 13	Columbus Crew	1-1 (a.e.t.)	D.C. United	Columbus, OH
8:00 PM EDT	Cunningham 2'; DeBrito (yellow card) 65'	Report	Aunger (yellow card) 31'; Wood 79'; Convey (yellow card) 82'	Stadium: Columbus Crew Stadium; Attendance: 19,431; Referee: Gerry Corrie; Assistant referees: Greg Barkey; Jamil Hamdan; Fourth official: Mikael Lundqvist

June 7 14	Dallas Burn	3-2	Columbus Crew	Dallas, TX
6:30 PM EDT	Alavanja 11'; Deering (yellow card) 33'; Graziani (yellow card) 64'; Eck 83'; Korol 89'	Report	West 18'; Pérez 43'; Vargas-Aguilera (yellow card) 64'	Stadium: Cotton Bowl; Attendance: 27,815; Referee: Brett Hugo; Assistant referees: Alex Prus; Paul Scott; Fourth official: Richard Triche

June 10 15	Columbus Crew	1-1 (a.e.t.)	Dallas Burn	Columbus, OH
4:30 PM EDT	Warzycha (yellow card) 33'; Farrell 72'	Report	Eck (yellow card) 26'; Korol 4'; Alavanja (yellow card) 88'; Deering (yellow card) 91'	Stadium: Columbus Crew Stadium; Attendance: 14,925; Referee: Tim Weyland; Assistant referees: Chip Reed; J.R. Perdue; Fourth official: Douglas Palomaki

June 17 16	Colorado Rapids	0-0 (a.e.t.)	Columbus Crew	Denver, CO
9:00 PM EDT	Limpar (yellow card) 26'; Balboa (yellow card) 32'; Moore (yellow card) 87'	Report	Gori (yellow card) 18'; Pérez (yellow card) 26'; Warzycha (yellow card) 94'	Stadium: Mile High Stadium; Attendance: 6,442; Referee: Kevin Terry; Assistant referees: Tom Bobadilla; Jose Corro; Fourth official: Ben Chouaf

June 24 17	Columbus Crew	3-1	New England Revolution	Columbus, OH
7:30 PM EDT	Farrell 15'; Pérez (yellow card) 60', (goal) 87'; Cunningham 69'; Elcock (yellow card) 85'	Report	Ramos 19', (yellow card) 42'	Stadium: Columbus Crew Stadium; Attendance: 15,039; Referee: Reggie Rutty; Assistant referees: John Spicer-Escalante; Tarek Khan; Fourth official: Mikael Lundqvist

June 28 18	Columbus Crew	1-2	Tampa Bay Mutiny	Columbus, OH
7:30 PM EDT	DeBrito (yellow card) 10'; Lapper (yellow card) 22'; Armas (yellow card) 67'; West 76'	Report	Diallo 45+1', (yellow card) 55'; Quill 82'; Addo (yellow card) 78'; Valderrama (yellow card) 90+1'	Stadium: Columbus Crew Stadium; Attendance: 13,030; Referee: Ted Covaciu; Assistant referees: Zekay Akbay; Brian Darling (AR2); Fourth official: Mikael Lundqvist

July 1 19	Columbus Crew	2-1	San Jose Earthquakes	Columbus, OH
7:30 PM EDT	Yeagley (yellow card) 47'; Warzycha 83' (pen.); Washington 84'; West (yellow card) 90'	Report	Solís (yellow card) 22'; Krakowiak 48', (yellow card) 59'; Bower (yellow card) 87'	Stadium: Columbus Crew Stadium; Attendance: 14,068; Referee: Gerry Corrie; Assistant referees: Chip Reed; Zekay Akbay; Fourth official: Douglas Palomaki

July 4 20	Los Angeles Galaxy	1-0	Columbus Crew	Pasadena, CA
10:30 PM EDT	Cienfuegos 4'; Vanney (yellow card) 16'; Jones (yellow card) 29'; Califf (yellow card) 88'	Report	Armas (yellow card) 51'; Elcock (yellow card) 63'; Clark (yellow card) 74'	Stadium: Rose Bowl; Attendance: 53,844; Referee: Kevin Stott; Assistant referees: Jorge Reyes; Roger Itaya; Fourth official: Mark Arblaster

July 8 21	Chicago Fire	3-1	Columbus Crew	Chicago, IL
8:00 PM EDT	Kovalenko 20', 36'; Bocanegra (yellow card) 29'; Wolff (yellow card) 62'; Razov 66'; Marsch (yellow card) 73'; Sorber (yellow card) 81'	Report	Farrell (yellow card) 18'; Washington 59'	Stadium: Soldier Field; Attendance: 10,879; Referee: Alex Prus; Assistant referees: Kari Seitz; Richard Huber; Fourth official: Elias Bazakos

July 12 22	Columbus Crew	4-1	New England Revolution	Columbus, OH
7:30 PM EDT	Washington 43', 49'; West 74', 89'	Report	Asad (yellow card) 63'; Harkes 80' (pen.); Wright (yellow card) 87'	Stadium: Columbus Crew Stadium; Attendance: 12,998; Referee: Kevin Terry; Assistant referees: Craig Lowry; J.R. Perdue; Fourth official: Douglas Palomaki

July 15 23	Columbus Crew	2-0	Kansas City Wizards	Columbus, OH
4:30 PM EDT	West (yellow card) 13'; Yeagley (yellow card) 40'; Washington 54'; Farrell 62'	Report	Molnar (yellow card) 45'; Johnston (yellow card) 52'; Brown (yellow card) 59'	Stadium: Columbus Crew Stadium; Attendance: 18,004; Referee: Terry Vaughn; Assistant referees: Nate Clement; Glenn Prechac; Fourth official: Mikael Lundqvist

July 22 24	Kansas City Wizards	3-1	Columbus Crew	Kansas City, MO
8:30 PM EDT	Klein 22'; Vermes (yellow card) 27'; Henderson 74', 81'; Johnson (yellow card) 88'	Report	Warzycha 40' (pen.); Pérez (yellow card) 82'	Stadium: Arrowhead Stadium; Attendance: 8,629; Referee: Richard Heron; Assistant referees: Richard Huber; Peter Kokolski; Fourth official: Joe Heyden

August 2 25	San Jose Earthquakes	1-2	Columbus Crew	San Jose, CA
10:00 PM EDT	Bower (yellow card) 2'; Doyle (yellow card) 85'; Brose 90+5' (pen.)	Report	Cunningham (yellow card) 41'; Lapper 43'; McBride 51'	Stadium: Spartan Stadium; Attendance: 7,643; Referee: Brian Hall; Assistant referees: David Bragg; Cory Dean; Fourth official: Thomas Branch

August 5 26	New England Revolution	1-1 (a.e.t.)	Columbus Crew	Foxborough, MA
7:00 PM EDT	Harris (yellow card) 64', (goal) 88'	Report	Lapper (yellow card) 39'; Warzycha 84'; Chulis (yellow card) 87'	Stadium: Foxboro Stadium; Attendance: 19,809; Referee: Noel Kenny; Assistant referees: Nate Clement; Craig Lowry; Fourth official: Rachel Woo

August 16 27	Columbus Crew	2-0	Miami Fusion F.C.	Columbus, OH
7:30 PM EDT	Warzycha (yellow card) 28'; Clark (yellow card) 30'; Washington 62'; Gori 90+1'	Report	Gutierrez (yellow card) 61'; Rooney (yellow card) 82'	Stadium: Columbus Crew Stadium; Attendance: 16,192; Referee: Terry Vaughn; Assistant referees: Richard Huber; J.R. Perdue; Fourth official: Douglas Palomaki

August 26 28	New England Revolution	2-1	Columbus Crew	Foxborough, MA
7:00 PM EDT	Baba 35' (pen.), (yellow card) 58'; Sunsing (yellow card) 39'; Harris 51'; Franchino (yellow card) 62'; Eyre (yellow card) 70'	Report	McBride 20' (pen.); Cunningham (yellow card) 44'; Clark (yellow card) 47'; Lapper (yellow card) 56'; Gori (yellow card) 75'	Stadium: Foxboro Stadium; Attendance: 17,867; Referee: Rich Grady; Assistant referees: John Konstantinidis; Roger Sill; Fourth official: Bahij Salman

August 30 29	Columbus Crew	3-4	Tampa Bay Mutiny	Columbus, OH
7:30 PM EDT	Joseph 14', (yellow card) 25', (goal) 35'; Pérez 52'	Report	Diallo 20' (pen.) 53' 81'; Anderson (yellow card) 24', (goal) 57'	Stadium: Columbus Crew Stadium; Attendance: 15,941; Referee: Gerry Corrie; Assistant referees: John Spicer-Escalante; Jamil Hamdan; Fourth official: Mikael Lundqvist

September 1 30	San Jose Earthquakes	3-0	Columbus Crew	San Jose, CA
11:30 PM EDT	Doyle 2'; Russell 4'; Krakowiak (yellow card) 29', (goal) 90'; Burns (yellow card) 65'; Azizi (yellow card) 78'	Report	Vargas-Aguilera (yellow card) 85'	Stadium: Spartan Stadium; Attendance: 26,853; Referee: Tim Weyland; Assistant referees: Chris Strickland; David Bragg; Fourth official: Thomas Branch

September 6 31	Chicago Fire	3-1	Columbus Crew	Chicago, IL
8:00 PM EDT	Soehn 8'; Razov 40'; Stoichkov (yellow card) 44', (goal) 82' (pen.); Thornton (yellow card) 77'	Report	Yeagley (yellow card) 15'; Elcock (yellow card) 28', (goal) 59'; Rzepa (yellow card) 75' (yellow-red card) 81'	Stadium: Soldier Field; Attendance: 7,075; Referee: Kevin Terry; Assistant referees: Francisco Sanchez; Albert Echeverria; Fourth official: Ricardo Salazar

September 9 32	Columbus Crew	2-3	Chicago Fire	Columbus, OH
7:30 PM EDT	West (yellow card) 17'; Duhaney 34'; McBride 88'	Report	Nowak 23', (yellow card) 70'; Razov 26'; Sorber 90'	Stadium: Columbus Crew Stadium; Attendance: 24,347; Referee: Richard Heron; Assistant referees: Rob Fereday; George Gansner; Fourth official: Mikael Lundqvist

=== MLS Cup Playoffs ===
The Columbus Crew failed to qualify for the playoffs in this season.

=== U.S. Open Cup ===
June 14 Second Round	Cape Cod Crusaders (PDL) (Massachusetts)	0-2	(Ohio) Columbus Crew (MLS)	South Yarmouth, MA
	West 46'; Vargas-Aguilera 55', (yellow card) 72'	Report	O'Brien (yellow card) 70'	Stadium: Alan Carson Field; Attendance: 848; Referee: Richard Eddy

July 19 Third Round	Columbus Crew (MLS) (Ohio)	4-1	(Virginia) Hampton Road Mariners (A-L)	Columbus, OH
	Duhaney (yellow card) 6', (goal) 60'; Joseph 25'; Farrell 30'; Schell 90'	Report	Checcio (yellow card) 32'; Fenger 39'; Martínez (yellow card) 63'; Kraemer (yellow card) 85'	Stadium: Columbus Crew Stadium; Attendance: 3,297; Referee: Kevin Stott

August 9 Quarterfinals	Columbus Crew (MLS) (Ohio)	1-1 (a.e.t.) (6-7 SO)	(New Jersey) NY/NJ MetroStars (MLS)	Columbus, OH
	Lapper (yellow card) 58'; Brian McBride 74'	Report	Tab Ramos (yellow card) 28', (goal) 62'	Stadium: Columbus Crew Stadium; Attendance: 4,177; Referee: Noel Kenny
	Shootout
	Warzycha (penalty scored); McBride (penalty scored); Pérez (penalty scored); Joseph (penalty scored); Farrell (penalty missed); Aguilera (penalty scored); Yeagley (penalty scored); Lapper (penalty missed)		(penalty scored) Valencia; (penalty scored) Walsh; (penalty scored) Chung; (penalty scored) Jolley; (penalty missed) Ramos; (penalty scored) Corrales; (penalty scored) Shak; (penalty scored) Petke

== Statistics ==
=== Appearances and goals ===
Under "Apps" for each section, the first number represents the number of starts, and the second number represents appearances as a substitute.

No.	Pos	Nat	Player	Total		MLS		U.S. Open Cup	
No.	Pos	Nat	Player	Apps	Goals	Apps	Goals	Apps	Goals
1	GK	(United States) USA	Mark Dougherty	25	0	25+0	0	0+0	0
2	DF	(United States) USA	Mike Lapper	26	1	20+4	1	2+0	0
3	DF	(United States) USA	Mike Clark	31	0	28+0	0	3+0	0
4	DF	(Argentina) ARG	Mario Gori	28	1	19+6	1	2+1	0
5	DF	(United States) USA	Matt Chulis	6	0	2+4	0	0+0	0
6	MF	(United States) USA	Todd Yeagley	28	0	24+1	0	3+0	0
7	MF	(Bolivia) BOL	Roland Vargas-Aguilera	19	1	3+13	0	2+1	1
8	MF	(United States) USA	Miles Joseph	23	3	8+12	2	2+1	1
9	FW	(United States) USA	Dante Washington	30	15	28+2	15	0+0	0
10	MF	(United States) USA	Brian Maisonneuve	0	0	0+0	0	0+0	0
11	FW	(United States) USA	Jeff Cunningham	32	2	16+13	2	3+0	0
12	MF	(United States) USA	Jason Farrell	27	4	13+11	3	3+0	1
13	DF	(Trinidad and Tobago) TRI	Ancil Elcock	21	1	18+1	1	1+1	0
14	MF	(Colombia) COL	John Wilmar Pérez	32	3	30+0	3	2+0	0
15	DF	(United States) USA	Mike Duhaney	23	2	14+6	1	2+1	1
16	MF	(United States) USA	Steve Armas	5	0	4+0	0	0+1	0
17	FW	(United States) USA	Brian West	29	7	24+4	6	0+1	1
18	GK	(United States) USA	Matt Napoleon	11	0	7+1	0	3+0	0
19	MF	(Poland) POL	Robert Warzycha	31	6	29+1	6	1+0	0
20	FW	(United States) USA	Brian McBride	19	7	17+1	6	1+0	1
21	MF	(United States) USA	Mario Longo	1	0	0+0	0	0+1	0
22	DF	(United States) USA	Dominic Schell	9	1	1+6	0	1+1	1
23	DF	(Poland) POL	Mirosław Rzepa	5	0	4+1	0	0+0	0
24	MF	(United States) USA	John DeBrito	21	0	17+3	0	1+0	0
33	GK	(United States) USA	Matthew Nelson	0	0	0+0	0	0+0	0
			Own goal	0	1	-	1	-	0
Players who left Columbus during the season:
16	MF	(United States) USA	Rob Smith	1	0	1+0	0	0+0	0
23	FW	(United States) USA	Christof Lindenmayer	0	0	0+0	0	0+0	0
33	GK	(United States) USA	Chuck Browder	0	0	0+0	0	0+0	0
33	GK	(United States) USA	Greg Connel	0	0	0+0	0	0+0	0

=== Disciplinary record ===
No.	Pos.	Name	MLS		U.S. Open Cup		Total	
No.	Pos.	Name	Booked	Sent off (straight red)	Booked	Sent off (straight red)	Booked	Sent off (straight red)
1	GK	(United States) Mark Dougherty	0	0	0	0	0	0
2	DF	(United States) Mike Lapper	4	0	1	0	5	0
3	DF	(United States) Mike Clark	6	0	0	0	6	0
4	DF	(Argentina) Mario Gori	5	0	0	0	5	0
5	DF	(United States) Matt Chulis	2	0	0	0	2	0
6	MF	(United States) Todd Yeagley	5	0	0	0	5	0
7	MF	(Bolivia) Roland Vargas-Aguilera	2	0	1	0	3	0
8	MF	(United States) Miles Joseph	2	0	0	0	2	0
9	FW	(United States) Dante Washington	1	0	0	0	1	0
10	MF	(United States) Brian Maisonneuve	0	0	0	0	0	0
11	FW	(United States) Jeff Cunningham	3	0	0	0	3	0
12	MF	(United States) Jason Farrell	1	0	0	0	1	0
13	DF	(Trinidad and Tobago) Ancil Elcock	5	0	0	0	5	0
14	MF	(Colombia) John Wilmar Pérez	4	0	0	0	4	0
15	DF	(United States) Mike Duhaney	1	0	1	0	2	0
16	MF	(United States) Steve Armas	2	0	0	0	2	0
17	FW	(United States) Brian West	5	0	0	0	5	0
18	GK	(United States) Matt Napoleon	0	0	0	0	0	0
19	MF	(Poland) Robert Warzycha	6	1	0	0	6	1
20	FW	(United States) Brian McBride	1	0	0	0	1	0
21	MF	(United States) Mario Longo	0	0	0	0	0	0
22	DF	(United States) Dominic Schell	0	0	0	0	0	0
23	DF	(United States) Mirosław Rzepa	1	1	0	0	1	1
24	MF	(United States) John DeBrito	7	0	0	0	7	0
33	GK	(United States) Matthew Nelson	0	0	0	0	0	0
Players who left Columbus during the season:
16	MF	(United States) Rob Smith	0	0	0	0	0	0
23	FW	(United States) Christof Lindenmayer	0	0	0	0	0	0
33	GK	(United States) Chuck Browder	0	0	0	0	0	0
33	GK	(United States) Greg Connel	0	0	0	0	0	0

=== Clean sheets ===
No.	Name	MLS	U.S. Open Cup	Total	Games Played
1	(United States) Mark Dougherty	3	0	0	25
18	(United States) Matt Napoleon	1	1	2	11
33	(United States) Matthew Nelson	0	0	0	0
Players who left Columbus during the season:
33	(United States) Chuck Browder	0	0	0	0
33	(United States) Greg Connel	0	0	0	0

== Transfers ==
=== In ===
Pos.	Player	Transferred from	Fee/notes	Date	Source
DF	(United States) Mike Duhaney	(United States) NY/NJ MetroStars	Traded for Thomas Dooley	January 28, 2000	
FW	(United States) Dante Washington	(United States) Dallas Burn	Traded for a first round draft pick in the 2000 MLS SuperDraft	February 6, 2000	
MF	(Bolivia) Roland Vargas-Aguilera	(Bolivia) Tahuichi Academy	Drafted in round 2 of the 2000 MLS SuperDraft.	February 6, 2000	
MF	(United States) Brian Winters	(United States) Portland Pilots	Drafted in round 3 of the 2000 MLS SuperDraft.	February 6, 2000	
FW	(United States) Christof Lindenmayer	(United States) Loyola Greyhounds	Drafted in round 4 of the 2000 MLS SuperDraft.	February 6, 2000	
DF	(United States) Dominic Schell	(United States) Mobile Rams	Drafted in round 5 of the 2000 MLS SuperDraft.	February 6, 2000	
MF	(Colombia) John Wilmar Pérez	(Colombia) Deportivo Cali	Allocated by Major League Soccer	March 7, 2000	
MF	(United States) Miles Joseph	(United States) NY/NJ MetroStars	Traded for a second-round pick in the 2001 MLS SuperDraft	May 3, 2000	
MF	(United States) Mario Longo	(United States) MLS Project-40	Acquired from MLS Project-40 via lottery	May 8, 2000	
MF	(United States) Steve Armas	(United States) Raleigh Capital Express	Signed via discovery	June 3, 2000	
DF	(Poland) Mirosław Rzepa	(Poland) Odra Opole	Signed via discovery	August 9, 2000	

=== Loan in ===
Pos.	Player	Parent club	Length/Notes	Beginning	End	Source
GK	(United States) Chuck Browder	(United States) Indiana Blast	Short term agreements	May 6, 2000; July 11, 2000	May 10, 2000; July 22, 2000	
GK	(United States) Matthew Nelson	(United States) Cape Cod Crusaders	Short term agreement	September 6, 2000	End of Season	

=== Out ===
Pos.	Player	Transferred to	Fee/notes	Date	Source
MF	(Jamaica) Andy Williams	(United States) Miami Fusion F.C.	Traded for a first round draft pick in the 2000 MLS SuperDraft	January 3, 2000	
DF	(United States) Thomas Dooley	(United States) NY/NJ MetroStars	Traded for Mike Duhaney	January 28, 2000	
DF	(United States) Billy Thompson	Retired	Placed on waivers	February 21, 2000	
MF	(United States) Brian Winters	(United States) Portland Timbers	Placed on waivers	March 14, 2000	
GK	(United States) Juergen Sommer	(United States) New England Revolution	Traded for a third-round pick in the 2001 MLS SuperDraft and future considerations.	March 14, 2000	
MF	(United States) Rob Smith	Retired		May 4, 2000	
FW	(United States) Christof Lindenmayer	(United States) Hershey Wildcats	Placed on waivers	June 3, 2000	
DF	(United States) Dominic Schell	(United States) Nashville Metros	Placed on waivers	November 1, 2000	
MF	(United States) Steve Armas	(United States) Atlanta Silverbacks	Placed on waivers	November 1, 2000	
DF	(Poland) Mirosław Rzepa	(Poland) Stomil Olsztyn	Placed on waivers	November 1, 2000	
MF	(United States) Jason Farrell	(United States) Seattle Sounders	Contract expired	December 31, 2000	

=== Loans out ===
Pos.	Player	Loanee club	Length/Notes	Beginning	End	Source
DF	(United States) Dominic Schell	(United States) MLS Project-40	Multiple short term agreements.	April 8, 2000	End of Season	
MF	(United States) Steve Armas	(United States) MLS Project-40	Multiple short term agreements.	April 8, 2000	End of Season	
MF	(United States) Mario Longo	(United States) MLS Project-40	Multiple short term agreements.	April 8, 2000	End of Season	
GK	(United States) Matt Napoleon	(United States) MLS Project-40	Multiple short term agreements.	April 8, 2000	End of Season	
FW	(United States) Christof Lindenmayer	(United States) MLS Project-40	Multiple short term agreements.	April 8, 2000	June 3, 2000	
DF	(United States) Dominic Schell	(United States) Cincinnati Riverhawks	Short term agreement			
MF	(United States) Steve Armas	(United States) Cincinnati Riverhawks	Short term agreement			
FW	(United States) Brian McBride	(United States) Preston North End		September 10, 2000	March, 2001	
DF	(Trinidad and Tobago) Ancil Elcock	(Trinidad and Tobago) Joe Public F.C.		November 1, 2000	March, 2001	

=== MLS Draft picks ===
Draft picks are not automatically signed to the team roster. Only those who are signed to a contract will be listed as transfers in. The picks for the Columbus Crew are listed below:

2000 Columbus Crew SuperDraft Picks
Round	Pick	Player	Position	College
2	21	(Bolivia) Roland Vargas-Aguilera	MF	Tahuichi Academy
3	33	(United States) Brian Winters	MF	Portland
4	45	(United States) Christof Lindenmayer	FW	Loyola University Maryland
5	57	(United States) Dominic Schell	DF	Mobile

== Awards ==
=== MLS Player of the Week ===
Week	Player	Opponent(s)	Link
18	(United States) Dante Washington	New England Revolution; Kansas City Wizards	

=== MLS Player of the Month ===
Month	Player	Stats	Link
July	(United States) Dante Washington	5 goals	

=== 2000 MLS All-Star Game ===
Reserves

- DF Dante Washington
- FW Brian McBride
- DF Mike Clark

=== Crew Team Awards ===
- Most Valuable Player – Robert Warzycha
- Defensive Player of the Year – Mike Clark
- Scoring Champion – Dante Washington
- Man of the Year – Robert Warzycha
- Coach's Award – Roland Vargas-Aguilera
- Goal of the Year – Robert Warzycha
- Humanitarian of the Year – John DeBrito
- Hardest Working Man of the Year – Mario Gori
