= 2001 Columbus Crew season =

Columbus Crew
2001 season
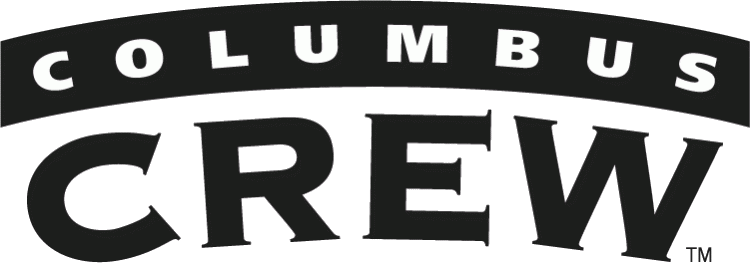
- Investor-operators: Lamar Hunt; Clark Hunt; Dan Hunt; Lamar Hunt Jr. Sharron Hunt Munson; Ron Pizzuti and a group of local investors
- Head Coach: Tom Fitzgerald (until May 17); Greg Andrulis (interim) (from May 17)
- Stadium: Columbus Crew Stadium
- Major League Soccer: Division: 2nd Overall: 4th
- MLS Cup playoffs: Quarterfinals
- U.S. Open Cup: Quarterfinals
- CONCACAF Giants Cup: Quarterfinals
- MLS Spring Training: 7th Place
- Top goalscorer: League: Jeff Cunningham (10); All: Jeff Cunningham (14)
- Highest home attendance: 24,033 (9/1 v. NE)
- Lowest home attendance: 4,316 (7/11 v. MIA)
- Average home league attendance: 17,752 (78.7%)
- Biggest win: CLB 4–1 NEW (7/12); CLB 6–1 TAM (6/16)
- Biggest defeat: DAL 4-0 CLB (5/12)
Home colors	Away colors

The 2001 Columbus Crew season was the club's sixth season of existence and their sixth consecutive season in Major League Soccer, the top flight of soccer in the United States. The first match of the season was on April 7 against Chicago Fire. It was the sixth season under head coach Tom Fitzgerald. Tom Fitzgerald was replaced as interim head coach by Greg Andrulis on May 17. The Crew's USL A-League affiliates this season were Cincinnati Riverhawks, Indiana Blast, Pittsburgh Riverhounds, Rochester Raging Rhinos and Reading Rage.

Due to the events of September 11, the Crew's last two matches were cancelled, along with all other MLS clubs'.

== Roster ==
As of September 8, 2001

Note: Flags indicate national team as defined under FIFA eligibility rules; some limited exceptions apply. Players may hold more than one non-FIFA nationality.

No.	Pos.	Nation	Player
1	GK	USA	Mark Dougherty
2	DF	USA	Mike Lapper
3	DF	USA	Mike Clark (captain)
4	DF	CRC	Daniel Torres
6	MF	USA	Todd Yeagley
7	MF	USA	John Harkes
8	DF	NZL	Duncan Oughton
9	FW	USA	Dante Washington
10	MF	USA	Brian Maisonneuve
11	FW	USA	Jeff Cunningham
12	FW	USA	Edson Buddle

No.	Pos.	Nation	Player
13	DF	TTO	Ancil Elcock
14	MF	COL	John Wilmar Pérez
15	DF	USA	Mike Duhaney
17	FW	USA	Brian West
19	MF	POL	Robert Warzycha
20	FW	USA	Brian McBride
21	MF	USA	Mario Longo
22	GK	USA	Tom Presthus
25	MF	USA	Scott Powers
29	DF	TTO	Kevin Adams
30	DF	UGA	Tenywa Bonseu

== Technical Staff ==
Position	Staff
General Manager	(United States) Jim Smith
Head Coach	(United States) Tom Fitzgerald until May 17 (United States) Greg Andrulis after May 17
Assistant Coach	(United States) Greg Andrulis until May 17
Assistant Coach	(Argentina) Oscar Pisano
Assistant Coach	(United States) Nick Roberts until May 17
Head Trainer	(United States) Amy Baer
Team Manager	(United States) Tucker Walther

== Non-competitive ==
=== Preseason ===
The Crew started their preseason in the Columbus area on January 8 before going to Germany from February 14 to 24 for a series of exhibition matches. They brought some non-roster invitees to Germany that included Cheikh Sidy Ba, Arne Tammen, Richard Ackon, Mike Mucino and Eben Dugbatey. The Crew returned to Columbus for a couple more exhibition matches before heading to Fort Lauderdale for MLS Spring Training 2001. They brought more non-roster invitees to participate that included Marcus Stergiopoulos and Julian Martinez.

February 17 Friendly	1. FC Schweinfurt 05	3-2	Columbus Crew	Schweinfurt, Germany
8:00 AM EST	Goal	Report	Warzycha 40'; Yeagley 73'	Stadium: Willy-Sachs-Stadion

February 18 Friendly	TSV 1860 Munich	1-0	Columbus Crew	Munich, Germany
8:30 AM EST	Goal	Report		Stadium: Grünwalder Stadion

February 20 Friendly	SpVgg SV Weiden	1-2	Columbus Crew	Weiden in der Oberpfalz, Germany
12:45 PM EST	Staeller 7'	Report	Mucino 82'; Longo 88'	Stadium: Weiden Stadium

February 21 Friendly	SpVgg Unterhaching	3-1	Columbus Crew	Munich, Germany
9:00 AM EST	Ahanfouf 32' (pen.); Bugera 37'; Garcia 39'	Report	Karn 69'	Stadium: Sportpark Unterhaching

February 24 Friendly	Franconian All-Stars	0-3	Columbus Crew	Pegnitz, Germany
8:30 AM EST		Report		Stadium: FC Pegnitz Stadium

March 3 Friendly	Columbus Crew	6-0	Indiana Blast	Obetz, OH
	Pérez; Cunningham; Buddle, Vargas-Aguilera; Mucino	Report		Stadium: Crew Training Center

March 7 Friendly	Columbus Crew	5-1	West Virginia Mountaineers	Obetz, OH
	Karn,, West; Cunningham	Report		Stadium: Crew Training Center

March 15 MLS Spring Training	Columbus Crew	1-1 (a.e.t.)	NY/NJ MetroStars	Fort Lauderdale, FL
6:00 PM EST	West (yellow card) 23'; Cunningham 87'	Report	Hernández 90'	Stadium: Lockhart Stadium; Referee: Richard Heron; Assistant referees: Jon Wilson; Kermit Quisenberry

March 19 MLS Spring Training	Columbus Crew	3-1	D.C. United	Fort Lauderdale, FL
6:00 PM EST	West 25'; Brian McBride 52', 67'	Report	Albright 4'; Mulraine (yellow card) 69'	Stadium: Lockhart Stadium; Referee: Peter Kokolski; Assistant referees: Greg Barkey; Richard Huber

March 23 MLS Spring Training	Colorado Rapids	1-0 (a.e.t.)	Columbus Crew	Fort Lauderdale, FL
6:00 PM EST	Aunger (yellow card) 34'; Key (yellow card) 37'; Agogo (yellow card) 64'; Bravo 99'	Report	Clark (yellow card) 25'; Pérez (yellow card) 98'	Stadium: Lockhart Stadium; Referee: Michael Kennedy; Assistant referees: Robbie Mann; George Gansner
Note: Columbus finished 7th place in Spring Training

March 28 Friendly	Columbus Crew	Cancelled	Miami Fusion F.C.	Strongsville, OH
7:00 PM EST		Report		Stadium: Ehrnfelt Soccer Complex

=== Midseason ===
The Crew played an international friendly against Bayer 04 Leverkusen. For this game, they called up from Pittsburgh Riverhounds, former players Mario Gori and Ricardo Iribarren.

May 2 Keith Evans Memorial Match	Columbus Crew	1-0	Ohio State Buckeyes	Obetz, OH
7:30 p.m. EDT	Washington			Stadium: Crew Training Center

May 29 Friendly	Columbus Crew	4-3	Bayer 04 Leverkusen	Columbus, OH
	McBride 39', 45+1'; Pérez 76'; Elcock (yellow card) 77'; Cunningham 81'; Clark (yellow card) (yellow-red card) 85'	Report	Brdaric 55', 77'; Ponte 70'; Hejduk (red card) 85'	Stadium: Columbus Crew Stadium; Attendance: 9,389; Referee: Terry Vaughn

== Competitive ==
=== Overview ===
Competition	First match	Last match	Starting round	Final position	Record							
Competition	First match	Last match	Starting round	Final position	Pld	W	D	L	GF	GA	GD	Win %
Major League Soccer	April 7, 2001	September 9, 2001	Matchday 1	4th	26	13	6	7	49	36	+13	50.00
MLS Cup Playoffs	September 22, 2001	September 26, 2001	Quarterfinals	Quarterfinals	2	0	0	2	1	6	−5	0.00
U.S. Open Cup	June 27, 2001	July 24, 2001	Second Round	Quarterfinals	3	2	0	1	8	3	+5	66.67
CONCACAF Giants Cup	April 4, 2001	April 11, 2001	Quarterfinals	Quarterfinals	2	0	1	1	1	2	−1	0.00
Total					33	15	7	11	59	47	+12	45.45

Source: Competitions

=== MLS ===
==== Standings ====
===== Central Division =====
Pos	Team	Pld	W	L	T	GF	GA	GD	Pts	Qualification
1	Chicago Fire	27	16	6	5	50	30	+20	53	Qualification for the quarterfinals
2	Columbus Crew	26	13	7	6	49	36	+13	45	Qualification for the quarterfinals
3	Dallas Burn	26	10	11	5	48	47	+1	35	Qualification for the quarterfinals
4	Tampa Bay Mutiny	27	4	21	2	32	68	−36	14	

Source: MLS

===== Overall table =====
Pos	Team	Pld	W	L	T	GF	GA	GD	Pts	PPG	Qualification
2	Chicago Fire	27	16	6	5	50	30	+20	53	1.96	
3	Los Angeles Galaxy	26	14	7	5	52	36	+16	47	1.81	
4	Columbus Crew	26	13	7	6	49	36	+13	45	1.73	
5	San Jose Earthquakes (C)	26	13	7	6	47	29	+18	45	1.73	Qualification for the CONCACAF Champions' Cup
6	MetroStars	26	13	10	3	38	35	+3	42	1.62	

Source: MLS
Rules for classification: 1) points per game; 2) total goal differential per match played; 3) total goals scored per match played; 4) away record; 5) away goal differential; 6) total goals scored in away matches; 7) home record; 8) home goal differential; 9) total goals scored in home matches; 10) fewest disciplinary points per match played; 6) away goal differential per away match played; 11) coin toss or drawing of lots.
(C) MLS Cup champions

==== Results summary ====
Overall								Home						Away					
Pld	Pts	W	L	T	GF	GA	GD	W	L	T	GF	GA	GD	W	L	T	GF	GA	GD
26	45	13	7	6	49	36	+13	7	1	5	29	15	+14	6	6	1	20	21	−1

Source: MLS standings
Pld = Matches played; Pts = Points; W = Matches won; T = Matches tied; L = Matches lost; GF = Goals for; GA = Goals against; GD = Goal difference

==== Results by round ====
Round	1	2	3	4	5	6	7	8	9	10	11	12	13	14	15	16	17	18	19	20	21	22	23	24	25	26
Stadium	H	A	H	H	A	A	H	H	H	A	H	A	A	A	H	H	H	H	A	A	H	A	A	A	H	A
Result	T	W	L	T	L	L	W	T	T	L	W	W	L	W	T	W	W	W	W	T	W	W	L	L	W	W

Source: schedule
A = Away; H = Home; W = Win; L = Loss; T = Tie

==== Match results ====
April 7 1	Columbus Crew	1-1 (a.e.t.)	Chicago Fire	Columbus, OH
7:30 PM EDT	Clark (yellow card) 14'; Elcock (yellow card) 66'; Washington 69'; Vargas-Aguilera (red card) 85'	Report	Wolyniec 16', (yellow card) 18'; Marsch (yellow card) 63'; Lewis (red card) 89'; Gutiérrez (red card) 94'	Stadium: Columbus Crew Stadium; Attendance: 17,947; Referee: Kevin Terry; Assistant referees: Richard Huber; George Gansner; Fourth official: Terry Vaughn

April 14 2	Tampa Bay Mutiny	1-2	Columbus Crew	Tampa, FL
7:00 PM EDT	Kotschau (yellow card) 30'; Demmin (yellow card) 43'; Ralston 67'	Report	Clark (yellow card) 7'; West 12'; Pérez 62'; Bonseu (yellow card) 85'; Elcock (yellow card) 90'	Stadium: Raymond James Stadium; Attendance: 16,823; Referee: Tim Weyland; Assistant referees: Scott Weyland; George Vergara; Fourth official: Roger Sill

April 21 3	Columbus Crew	0-3	Kansas City Wizards	Columbus, OH
7:30 PM EDT		Report	Gomez 9'; Brown 53'; McKeon 56'	Stadium: Columbus Crew Stadium; Attendance: 14,488; Referee: Richard Heron; Assistant referees: Craig Lowry; Richard Huber; Fourth official: Peter Kokolski

May 5 4	Columbus Crew	0-0 (a.e.t.)	Miami Fusion F.C.	Columbus, OH
4:00 PM EDT	Lapper (yellow card) 59'	Report	Serna (yellow card) 51'; Marshall (yellow card) 93'	Stadium: Columbus Crew Stadium; Attendance: 13,975; Referee: Michael Kennedy; Assistant referees: Francisco Sanchez; Steven Davidson; Fourth official: Mikael Lundqvist

May 12 5	Dallas Burn	4-0	Columbus Crew	Dallas, TX
8:30 PM EDT	Pareja (yellow card) 32'; Rodríguez 45+1' (pen.); Kreis 58'; Rhine (yellow card) 64'; Farrer 77'; Graziani 82'	Report	Elcock (yellow card) 41'; Clark (yellow card) 48'; Lapper (yellow card) 52'	Stadium: Cotton Bowl; Attendance: 14,087; Referee: Brian Hall; Assistant referees: Jon Wilson; David Bragg; Fourth official: Gibby Widner

May 16 6	New England Revolution	2-1	Columbus Crew	Foxborough, MA
7:00 PM EDT	Cloutier (yellow card) 24'; Catê 69', 83' (pen.)	Report	Buddle 74'; Pérez (yellow card) 90+2'	Stadium: Foxboro Stadium; Attendance: 7,864; Referee: Alex Prus; Assistant referees: Chip Reed; Richard Eddy; Fourth official: Bahij Salman
Note: Originally scheduled for April 28

May 19 7	Columbus Crew	2-1 (a.e.t.)	D.C. United	Columbus, OH
7:30 PM EDT	McBride 25'; Elcock (red card) 59'; Bonseu (red card) 67'; Cunningham 99'	Report	Etcheverry (yellow card) 39'; Talley (yellow card) 40'; Convey (yellow card) 65'; Quaranta 69', (yellow card) 90'	Stadium: Columbus Crew Stadium; Attendance: 18,491; Referee: Rich Grady; Assistant referees: Roger Itaya; Steve Taylor; Fourth official: J.R. Perdue

May 26 8	Columbus Crew	3-3 (a.e.t.)	Colorado Rapids	Columbus, OH
7:30 PM EDT	Maisonneuve 4'; Pérez 58'; West 82'	Report	Balboa 21'; Spencer 28'; Baba (yellow card) 34'; Paule 48'	Stadium: Columbus Crew Stadium; Attendance: 12,630; Referee: Paul Tamberino; Assistant referees: George Gansner; Richard Eddy; Fourth official: Jamil Hamdan

June 2 9	Columbus Crew	1-1 (a.e.t.)	Los Angeles Galaxy	Columbus, OH
4:00 PM EDT	Lapper (yellow card) 45'; Pérez 49'	Report	Vanney (yellow card) 36'; Quijano 48'	Stadium: Columbus Crew Stadium; Attendance: 15,174; Referee: Richard Heron; Assistant referees: Kermit Quisenberry; Steven Davidson; Fourth official: J.R. Perdue

June 9 10	Chicago Fire	1-0	Columbus Crew	Chicago, IL
8:00 PM EDT	Beasley 37'	Report	Bonseu (yellow card) 71'	Stadium: Soldier Field; Attendance: 15,233; Referee: Andrew Barnes; Assistant referees: George Gansner; Francisco Sanchez; Fourth official: Michael Kennedy

June 16 11	Columbus Crew	6-1	Tampa Bay Mutiny	Columbus, OH
7:30 PM EDT	Harkes (yellow card) 12'; Washington 29', 73', 85'; Duhaney 39'; Cunningham 68', 76'	Report	Valderrama (red card) 12'; Demmin (yellow card) 45+3'	Stadium: Columbus Crew Stadium; Attendance: 19,128; Referee: Ricardo Salazar; Assistant referees: Richard Huber; Thomas Perry; Fourth official: Jamil Hamdan

June 23 12	Dallas Burn	1-2	Columbus Crew	Dallas, TX
8:00 PM EDT	Graziani 19'; Broome (yellow card) 88'	Report	Lapper 30', (yellow card) 90+1'; Cunningham (red card) 44'; West 54'	Stadium: Cotton Bowl; Attendance: 10,940; Referee: Michael Kennedy; Assistant referees: George Gansner; Richard Huber; Fourth official: Kevin Terry

June 30 13	Miami Fusion F.C.	4-3	Columbus Crew	Fort Lauderdale, FL
7:30 PM EDT	Bilyk (yellow card) 13'; Preki 29'; Rooney 36'; Serna 42'; Chacón 49'; Alavanja (yellow card) 60'	Report	Washington 28'; Buddle 55'; Maisonneuve 89'	Stadium: Lockhart Stadium; Attendance: 14,856; Referee: Ricardo Salazar; Assistant referees: Francisco Sanchez; Chip Reed; Fourth official: Reggie Rutty

July 4 14	Los Angeles Galaxy	0-2	Columbus Crew	Pasadena, CA
10:00 PM EDT	Hendrickson (yellow card) 20'; Vanney (yellow card) 48'; Hernández (yellow card) 84'	Report	Harkes (yellow card) 35'; West 67', 78'; Presthus (yellow card) 84'; Clark (yellow card) 87'	Stadium: Rose Bowl; Attendance: 52,634; Referee: Kevin Terry; Assistant referees: Jorge Reyes; Tom Bobadilla; Fourth official: Miguel Chicas

July 7 15	Columbus Crew	2-2 (a.e.t.)	Dallas Burn	Columbus, OH
4:00 PM EDT	Pérez (yellow card) 71', (goal) 81'; Cunningham (yellow card) 76'; Buddle 90'	Report	Graziani (yellow card) 43'; Deering (yellow card) 61', (goal) 75'; Pareja (yellow card) 71'; Kreis 82'	Stadium: Columbus Crew Stadium; Attendance: 18,937; Referee: Brian Hall; Assistant referees: Glenn Prechac; Steven Davidson; Fourth official: Andrew Barnes

July 18 16	Columbus Crew	2-1	NY/NJ MetroStars	Columbus, OH
7:30 PM EDT	West (yellow card) 30'; Chung 62' (o.g.); Washington 84'	Report	Hernández (yellow card) 75'; Lapper 81' (o.g.)	Stadium: Columbus Crew Stadium; Attendance: 15,855; Referee: Kevin Stott; Assistant referees: Craig Lowry; Kermit Quisenberry; Fourth official: Mikael Lundqvist

July 21 17	Columbus Crew	2-1	San Jose Earthquakes	Columbus, OH
7:30 PM EDT	Pérez 11'; Elcock 48'	Report	Agoos 44'; Corrales (yellow card) 51'; Donovan (yellow card) 83'	Stadium: Columbus Crew Stadium; Attendance: 20,273; Referee: Andrew Barnes; Assistant referees: Roger Itaya; Richard Eddy; Fourth official: Mikael Lundqvist

August 1 18	Columbus Crew	3-0	Chicago Fire	Columbus, OH
7:30 PM EDT	Clark (yellow card) 59'; Cunningham 65'; Pérez 69'; West (yellow card) 71'; Maisonneuve 83'	Report	Whitfield (yellow card) 53'; Stoichkov (yellow card) 58'; Beasley (yellow card) 80'; Armas (yellow card) 90'	Stadium: Columbus Crew Stadium; Attendance: 17,705; Referee: Gerry Corrie; Assistant referees: Chip Reed; Steven Davidson; Fourth official: Mikael Lundqvist

August 4 19	Kansas City Wizards	1-3	Columbus Crew	Kansas City, MO
8:30 PM EDT	Garcia (yellow card) 51'; McKeon (yellow card) 67'; Lowe 81'	Report	Pérez 35'; Cunningham 45+1'; Duhaney (yellow card) 68'; Bonseu (red card) 79'; Maisonneuve 90+2'	Stadium: Arrowhead Stadium; Attendance: 9,292; Referee: Ricardo Salazar; Assistant referees: Roger Itaya; Steven Davidson; Fourth official: Elias Bazakos

August 11 20	San Jose Earthquakes	2-2 (a.e.t.)	Columbus Crew	San Jose, CA
10:00 PM EDT	Cerritos 15', 39'; Russell (yellow card) 33'; Barrett (yellow card) 71'	Report	Cunningham 18'; Maisonneuve (yellow card) 21'; Clark (yellow card) 26'; Warzycha 52'	Stadium: Spartan Stadium; Attendance: 8,119; Referee: Peter Kokolski; Assistant referees: Roger Itaya; David Bragg; Fourth official: Brian Hall

August 15 21	Columbus Crew	3-0	Dallas Burn	Columbus, OH
7:30 PM EDT	Maisonneuve 18'; Duhaney (yellow card) 54'; Washington 75'; Pérez 90+1'	Report	Martínez (yellow card) 83'	Stadium: Columbus Crew Stadium; Attendance: 19,008; Referee: Kevin Stott; Assistant referees: Steve Taylor; John Konstantinidis; Fourth official: Mikael Lundqvist

August 19 22	NY/NJ MetroStars	0-1	Columbus Crew	East Rutherford, NJ
3:30 PM EDT	Paule (yellow card) 81'	Report	Maisonneuve 6'; Warzycha (red card) 45+3'	Stadium: Giants Stadium; Attendance: 16,229; Referee: Peter Kokolski; Assistant referees: Steve Taylor; Richard Eddy; Fourth official: Alex Prus

August 25 23	D.C. United	2-1	Columbus Crew	Washington, D.C.
3:00 PM EDT	Conteh (yellow card) 54', (goal) 80'; Etcheverry (yellow card) 58'; Armstrong 69'; Pope (yellow card) 76'	Report	Clark (yellow card) 14'; Cunningham 25', (yellow card) 41'; Oughton (yellow card) 52'	Stadium: Robert F. Kennedy Memorial Stadium; Attendance: 13,855; Referee: Kevin Stott; Assistant referees: Nate Clement; Glenn Prechac; Fourth official: Kenneth Kaplan

August 29 24	Chicago Fire	2-1	Columbus Crew	Chicago, IL
8:30 PM EDT	Gutiérrez (yellow card) 47'; Wynalda 50'; Razov 57'; Brown (yellow card) 62'; Nowak (yellow card) 65'	Report	Warzycha 7', (yellow card) 48'; Oughton (yellow card) 46'; Cunningham (yellow card) 65'	Stadium: Soldier Field; Attendance: 12,733; Referee: Alex Prus; Assistant referees: Greg Barkey; Steven Davidson; Fourth official: Marcel Yonan

September 1 25	Columbus Crew	4-1	New England Revolution	Columbus, OH
7:30 PM EDT	Lapper (yellow card) 12'; Warzycha (yellow card) 43', (goal) 90+2'; Bonseu (yellow card) 54'; Maisonneuve 55'; Cunningham 65', 80' (pen.); Oughton (yellow card) 78'; Longo (yellow card) 86'; Adams (yellow card) 90'	Report	Okoh 15'; Heaps (yellow card) 29'; Pierce (yellow card) 30'; Allnutt (yellow card) 38'; Álvarez (yellow card) 45'; Downing (yellow card) 87'	Stadium: Columbus Crew Stadium; Attendance: 24,033; Referee: Ricardo Valenzuela; Assistant referees: George Gansner; Glenn Prechac; Fourth official: Jamil Hamdan

September 9 26	Tampa Bay Mutiny	1-2	Columbus Crew	Tampa, FL
4:00 PM EDT	Barclay 23'	Report	Bonseu (yellow card) 11'; Pérez (yellow card) 16'; Maisonneuve 29'; Cunningham 40'	Stadium: Raymond James Stadium; Attendance: 9,932; Referee: Kevin Terry; Assistant referees: Greg Barkey; Jon Wilson; Fourth official: Robert Thunelius

September 12 27	Colorado Rapids	Cancelled	Columbus Crew	Denver, CO
9:00 PM EDT		Report		Stadium: Mile High Stadium

September 15 28	Columbus Crew	Cancelled	Tampa Bay Mutiny	Columbus, OH
7:30 PM EDT		Report		Stadium: Columbus Crew Stadium

=== MLS Cup Playoffs ===
==== Quarterfinals ====
September 22 Game 1	Columbus Crew	1-3	San Jose Earthquakes	Columbus, OH
7:30 PM EDT	Clark (yellow card) 24'; Warzycha 54' (pen.)	Report	Donovan 5', 45+1'; Barrett (yellow card) 19'; Lagos 31'	Stadium: Columbus Crew Stadium; Attendance: 20,883; Referee: Ricardo Salazar; Assistant referees: Steven Davidson; Chris Strickland; Fourth official: Marcel Yonan

September 26 Game 2	San Jose Earthquakes	3-0	Columbus Crew	San Jose, CA
10:00 PM EDT	Lagos 9'; Cerritos 68'; Donovan 76'	Report	Warzycha (yellow card) 30'; Lapper (yellow card) 61'; Clark (yellow card) 90+1'	Stadium: Spartan Stadium; Attendance: 10,419; Referee: Kevin Stott; Assistant referees: Tom Bobadilla; David Bragg; Fourth official: Ricardo Valenzuela
Note: San Jose wins series 2-0, advances to Semifinals.

September 29 Game 3	Columbus Crew	If Necessary	San Jose Earthquakes	Columbus, OH
7:30 PM EDT				Stadium: Columbus Crew Stadium

=== U.S. Open Cup ===
June 27 Second Round	Columbus Crew (MLS) (Ohio)	5-1	(North Carolina) Carolina Dynamo (PDL)	Columbus, OH
7:30 PM EDT	Washington 33', 44'; Cunningham 52', 88'; Pérez 79'	Report	Benjamin 82'	Stadium: Columbus Crew Stadium; Attendance: 9,339; Referee: Elias Bazakos

July 11 Third Round	Columbus Crew (MLS) (Ohio)	2-1	(Florida) Miami Fusion F.C. (MLS)	Columbus, OH
7:30 PM EDT	Cunningham 52', 89'	Report	Rooney 24'	Stadium: Columbus Crew Stadium; Attendance: 4,316; Referee: Noel Kenny

July 24 Quarterfinals	New England Revolution (MLS) (Massachusetts)	2-1	(Ohio) Columbus Crew (MLS)	Foxborough, MA
7:30 PM EDT	Catê 50'; Sunsing 62'	Report	Pérez 85'	Stadium: Foxboro Stadium; Attendance: 5,695; Referee: Ricardo Salazar

=== CONCACAF Giants Cup ===
==== Quarterfinals ====
April 4 Leg 1	Deportivo Saprissa (Costa Rica)	2-0	(United States) Columbus Crew	San José, Costa Rica
10:00 PM EDT	Centeno 68'; Lapper 90' (o.g.)	Report		Stadium: Estadio Ricardo Saprissa Aymá

April 11 Leg 2	Columbus Crew (United States)	1-1 (1-3 agg.)	(Costa Rica) Deportivo Saprissa	Columbus, OH
7:30 PM EDT	Elcock (yellow card) 35'; Maisonneuve 45'; Mucino (yellow card) 81' (yellow-red card) 90'	Report	Robinson 16'; Campos (yellow card) 31'; Drummond (yellow card) 81'	Stadium: Columbus Crew Stadium; Referee: Jose Farias Martinez (Canada); Assistant referees: Greg Barkey (United States); Nate Clement (United States); Fourth official: Kevin Terry (United States)

== Statistics ==
=== Appearances and goals ===
Under "Apps" for each section, the first number represents the number of starts, and the second number represents appearances as a substitute.

No.	Pos	Nat	Player	Total		MLS		MLS Cup Playoffs		U.S. Open Cup		CONCACAF Giants Cup	
No.	Pos	Nat	Player	Apps	Goals	Apps	Goals	Apps	Goals	Apps	Goals	Apps	Goals
1	GK	(United States) USA	Mark Dougherty	4	0	1+1	0	0+0	0	2+0	0	0+0	0
2	DF	(United States) USA	Mike Lapper	30	1	21+3	1	2+0	0	3+0	0	1+0	0
3	DF	(United States) USA	Mike Clark	31	0	25+0	0	2+0	0	3+0	0	1+0	0
4	DF	(Costa Rica) CRC	Daniel Torres	1	0	0+1	0	0+0	0	0+0	0	0+0	0
6	MF	(United States) USA	Todd Yeagley	7	0	3+2	0	0+0	0	0+0	0	2+0	0
7	MF	(United States) USA	John Harkes	23	0	16+2	0	2+0	0	3+0	0	0+0	0
8	DF	(New Zealand) NZL	Duncan Oughton	23	0	12+8	0	0+0	0	1+2	0	0+0	0
9	FW	(United States) USA	Dante Washington	24	9	13+8	7	1+0	0	1+0	2	1+0	0
10	MF	(United States) USA	Brian Maisonneuve	32	9	25+0	8	2+0	0	3+0	0	2+0	1
11	FW	(United States) USA	Jeff Cunningham	29	14	20+2	10	2+0	0	3+0	4	0+2	0
12	FW	(United States) USA	Edson Buddle	22	3	5+12	3	0+2	0	0+1	0	1+1	0
13	DF	(Trinidad and Tobago) TTO	Ancil Elcock	20	1	6+9	1	1+1	0	0+1	0	2+0	0
14	MF	(Colombia) COL	John Wilmar Pérez	31	10	23+2	8	2+0	0	3+0	2	1+0	0
15	DF	(United States) USA	Mike Duhaney	32	1	25+0	1	2+0	0	3+0	0	1+1	0
17	FW	(United States) USA	Brian West	28	5	19+2	5	1+1	0	3+0	0	2+0	0
19	MF	(Poland) POL	Robert Warzycha	15	4	9+2	3	1+1	1	0+0	0	2+0	0
20	FW	(United States) USA	Brian McBride	17	1	14+1	1	0+0	0	2+0	0	0+0	0
21	MF	(United States) USA	Mario Longo	5	0	0+4	0	0+0	0	0+1	0	0+0	0
22	GK	(United States) USA	Tom Presthus	30	0	25+0	0	2+0	0	1+0	0	2+0	0
25	MF	(United States) USA	Scott Powers	0	0	0+0	0	0+0	0	0+0	0	0+0	0
29	DF	(Trinidad and Tobago) TTO	Kevin Adams	5	0	0+5	0	0+0	0	0+0	0	0+0	0
30	DF	(Uganda) UGA	Tenywa Bonseu	31	0	24+0	0	2+0	0	3+0	0	2+0	0
			Own goal	0	1	-	1	-	0	-	0	-	0
Players who left Columbus during the season:
4	MF	(Bolivia) BOL	Roland Vargas-Aguilera	3	0	0+2	0	0+0	0	0+0	0	1+0	0
4	DF	(United States) USA	Jeremy Aldrich	0	0	0+0	0	0+0	0	0+0	0	0+0	0
4	FW	(United States) USA	Matt Fundenberger	0	0	0+0	0	0+0	0	0+0	0	0+0	0
4	MF	(United States) USA	John Jones	0	0	0+0	0	0+0	0	0+0	0	0+0	0
5	FW	(United States) USA	Mike Mucino	2	0	0+0	0	0+0	0	0+0	0	1+1	0
16	MF	(England) ENG	Ian Woan	4	0	0+3	0	0+0	0	0+1	0	0+0	0
18	GK	(United States) USA	Matt Napoleon	0	0	0+0	0	0+0	0	0+0	0	0+0	0
24	MF	(United States) USA	John DeBrito	2	0	0+2	0	0+0	0	0+0	0	0+0	0

=== Disciplinary record ===
No.	Pos.	Name	MLS		MLS Cup Playoffs		U.S. Open Cup		CONCACAF Giants Cup		Total	
No.	Pos.	Name	Yellow card	Red card	Yellow card	Red card	Yellow card	Red card	Yellow card	Red card	Yellow card	Red card
1	GK	(United States) Mark Dougherty	0	0	0	0	0	0	0	0	0	0
2	DF	(United States) Mike Lapper	5	0	1	0	0	0	0	0	6	0
3	DF	(United States) Mike Clark	7	0	2	0	0	0	0	0	9	0
4	DF	(Costa Rica) Daniel Torres	0	0	0	0	0	0	0	0	0	0
6	MF	(United States) Todd Yeagley	0	0	0	0	0	0	0	0	0	0
7	MF	(United States) John Harkes	2	0	0	0	0	0	0	0	2	0
8	DF	(New Zealand) Duncan Oughton	3	0	0	0	0	0	0	0	3	0
9	FW	(United States) Dante Washington	0	0	0	0	0	0	0	0	0	0
10	MF	(United States) Brian Maisonneuve	1	0	0	0	0	0	0	0	1	0
11	FW	(United States) Jeff Cunningham	3	1	0	0	0	0	0	0	3	1
12	FW	(United States) Edson Buddle	0	0	0	0	0	0	0	0	0	0
13	DF	(Trinidad and Tobago) Ancil Elcock	3	1	0	0	0	0	1	0	4	1
14	MF	(Colombia) John Wilmar Pérez	3	0	0	0	0	0	0	0	3	0
15	DF	(United States) Mike Duhaney	2	0	0	0	0	0	0	0	2	0
16	MF	(United States) Steve Armas	0	0	0	0	0	0	0	0	0	0
17	FW	(United States) Brian West	2	0	0	0	0	0	0	0	2	0
19	MF	(Poland) Robert Warzycha	2	1	1	0	0	0	0	0	3	1
20	FW	(United States) Brian McBride	0	0	0	0	0	0	0	0	0	0
21	MF	(United States) Mario Longo	1	0	0	0	0	0	0	0	1	0
22	GK	(United States) Tom Presthus	1	0	0	0	0	0	0	0	1	0
25	MF	(United States) Scott Powers	0	0	0	0	0	0	0	0	0	0
29	DF	(United States) Kevin Adams	1	0	0	0	0	0	0	0	1	0
30	DF	(United States) Tenywa Bonseu	4	2	0	0	0	0	0	0	4	2
Players who left Columbus during the season:
4	MF	(Bolivia) Roland Vargas-Aguilera	0	1	0	0	0	0	0	0	0	1
4	DF	(United States) Jeremy Aldrich	0	0	0	0	0	0	0	0	0	0
4	FW	(United States) Matt Fundenberger	0	0	0	0	0	0	0	0	0	0
4	MF	(United States) John Jones	0	0	0	0	0	0	0	0	0	0
5	MF	(United States) Mike Mucino	0	0	0	0	0	0	2	1	2	1
16	MF	(England) Ian Woan	0	0	0	0	0	0	0	0	0	0
18	GK	(United States) Matt Napoleon	0	0	0	0	0	0	0	0	0	0
24	MF	(United States) John DeBrito	0	0	0	0	0	0	0	0	0	0

=== Clean sheets ===
No.	Name	MLS	MLS Cup Playoffs	U.S. Open Cup	CONCACAF Giants Cup	Total	Games Played
1	(United States) Mark Dougherty	0	0	0	0	0	4
22	(United States) Tom Presthus	5	0	0	0	5	30
Players who left Columbus during the season:
18	(United States) Matt Napoleon	0	0	0	0	0	0

== Transfers ==
=== In ===
Pos.	Player	Transferred from	Fee/notes	Date	Source
DF	(Uganda) Tenywa Bonseu	(United States) Chicago Fire	Allocated by Major League Soccer	February 4, 2001	
GK	(United States) Tom Presthus	(United States) D.C. United	Traded for a first-round draft pick in the 2001 MLS SuperDraft	February 5, 2001	
DF	(New Zealand) Duncan Oughton	(United States) Cal State Fullerton Titans	Drafted in round 1 of the 2001 MLS SuperDraft	February 5, 2001	
FW	(United States) Edson Buddle	(United States) Long Island Rough Riders	Drafted in round 3 of the 2001 MLS SuperDraft	February 5, 2001	
DF	(Trinidad and Tobago) Kevin Adams	(United States) Joe Public F.C.	Drafted in round 3 of the 2001 MLS SuperDraft	February 5, 2001	
FW	(United States) McKinley Tennyson	(United States) UCLA Bruins	Drafted in round 4 of the 2001 MLS SuperDraft	February 5, 2001	
MF	(United States) Scott Powers	(United States) Brown Bears	Drafted in round 5 of the 2001 MLS SuperDraft	February 5, 2001	
FW	(United States) Phil Karn	(United States) Pittsburgh Riverhounds	Drafted in round 6 of the 2001 MLS SuperDraft	February 5, 2001	
FW	(United States) Mike Mucino	(United States) UC Irvine Anteaters		February 2001	
MF	(England) Ian Woan	(England) Swindon Town	Signed via discovery	May 8, 2001	
MF	(United States) John Harkes	(United States) New England Revolution	Traded for Roland Vargas-Aguilera and a fourth-round draft pick in the 2002 MLS SuperDraft	May 11, 2001	
DF	(Costa Rica) Daniel Torres	(Costa Rica) Deportivo Saprissa	Signed via discovery	September 7, 2001	

=== Loan in ===
Pos.	Player	Parent club	Length/Notes	Beginning	End	Source
DF	(United States) Jeremy Aldrich	(United States) Indiana Blast	Short-term agreement			
FW	(United States) Matt Fundenberger	(United States) Indiana Blast	Short-term agreement			
MF	(United States) John Jones	(United States) Pittsburgh Riverhounds	Short-term agreement			

=== Out ===
Pos.	Player	Transferred to	Fee/notes	Date	Source
DF	(Argentina) Mario Gori	(United States) Pittsburgh Riverhounds	Placed on waivers	February 4, 2001	
FW	(United States) Phil Karn	(United States) Pittsburgh Riverhounds	Placed on waivers	March 19, 2001	
DF	(United States) Matt Chulis	(United States) Chicago Fire	Placed on waivers	March 19, 2001	
MF	(United States) Miles Joseph	(United States) Dallas Burn	Traded for a fourth round draft pick in the 2002 MLS SuperDraft	March 20, 2001	
FW	(United States) Mike Mucino	(United States) Cincinnati Riverhawks	Released after preseason and the CONCACAF Giants Cup	April 2001	
GK	(United States) Matt Napoleon	(United States) Portland Timbers	Placed on waivers	April 13, 2001	
MF	(United States) John DeBrito	(United States) Dallas Burn	Placed on waivers	May 8, 2001	
MF	(Bolivia) Roland Vargas-Aguilera	(United States) New England Revolution	Traded with a fourth-round draft pick in the 2002 MLS SuperDraft for John Harkes	May 11, 2001	
FW	(United States) McKinley Tennyson	(United States) Los Angeles Galaxy	Rights traded for third-round draft pick in the 2002 MLS SuperDraft	August 16, 2001	
MF	(England) Ian Woan	(United States) Miami Fusion F.C.	Traded for a fourth-round draft pick in the 2002 MLS SuperDraft	August 16, 2001	
DF	(Trinidad and Tobago) Kevin Adams	(Trinidad and Tobago) Tobago United F.C.	Placed on waivers	November 17, 2001	
MF	(United States) Mario Longo	(United States) Cincinnati Riverhawks	Placed on waivers	November 17, 2001	
DF	(United States) Mike Duhaney	(Germany) 1. FSV Mainz 05	Contract expired	December 31, 2001	

=== Loans out ===
Pos.	Player	Loanee club	Length/Notes	Beginning	End	Source
DF	(Trinidad and Tobago) Kevin Adams	(United States) Cincinnati Riverhawks	Multiple short-term agreements			
MF	(United States) Mario Longo	(United States) Cincinnati Riverhawks	Multiple short-term agreements			
DF	(New Zealand) Duncan Oughton	(United States) Cincinnati Riverhawks	Short-term agreement			
MF	(England) Ian Woan	(United States) Cincinnati Riverhawks	Multiple short-term agreements			
FW	(United States) Jeff Cunningham	(Germany) Bayer 04 Leverkusen		October 9, 2001	March 2002	

=== MLS Draft picks ===
Draft picks are not automatically signed to the team roster. Only those who are signed to a contract will be listed as transfers in. The picks for the Columbus Crew are listed below:

2001 Columbus Crew SuperDraft Picks
Round	Pick	Player	Position	College
1	10	(New Zealand) Duncan Oughton	DF	Cal State Fullerton
3	27	(United States) Edson Buddle	FW	State Fair Community College
3	30	(Trinidad and Tobago) Kevin Adams	DF	Joe Public F.C.
4	39	(United States) McKinley Tennyson	FW	UCLA
5	51	(United States) Scott Powers	MF	Brown
6	63	(United States) Phil Karn	FW	Penn State

== Awards ==
=== MLS Player of the Week ===
Week	Player	Opponent(s)	Link
11	(United States) Dante Washington	Tampa Bay Mutiny	

=== MLS Player of the Month ===
Month	Player	Stats	Link
August	(United States) Brian Maisonneuve	4 goals, 2 assists	

=== 2001 MLS All-Star Game ===
Starters

- MF John Wilmar Pérez
- FW Brian McBride

Reserves

- DF Mike Clark

=== Postseason ===
MLS Executive of the Year

- Jim Smith

=== Crew Team Awards ===
- Most Valuable Player – John Wilmar Pérez
- Defensive Player of the Year – Tom Presthus
- Scoring Champion – Jeff Cunningham
- Man of the Year – Brian Maisonneuve
- Coach's Award – Robert Warzycha
- Goal of the Year – Brian Maisonneuve
- Humanitarian of the Year – Todd Yeagley
- Hardest Working Man of the Year – Tom Presthus
