= 2000 U.S. Open Cup =

2000 Lamar Hunt U.S. Open Cup
Tournament details
- Country: United States

Final positions
- Champions: Chicago Fire (2nd title)
- Runners-up: Miami Fusion

Tournament statistics
- Top goal scorer(s): Welton; Josh Wolff (6 goals each)

The 2000 Lamar Hunt U.S. Open Cup ran from June through October, 2000, open to all soccer teams in the United States.

The Chicago Fire earned their second Open Cup by defeating the Miami Fusion 2–1 in the final at Soldier Field, Chicago.

Amateur club Uruguay SC narrowly missed a major second-round upset, losing in overtime to the Tampa Bay Mutiny. Two PDL teams - the Mid Michigan Bucks and the Chicago Sockers - beat MLS teams in the second round, but the quarterfinals were an all-MLS affair. Mid Michigan came closest to duplicating its second-round upset, losing in a shootout to eventual runner-up Miami. Two referees were used for all games from the second round through the semifinals as part of a FIFA experiment.

== Open Cup Bracket ==
Home teams listed on top of bracket

Second Round
D3	Riverside County Elite	1
A-L	San Diego Flash	2
MLS	Los Angeles Galaxy	2
A-L	Seattle Sounders	1
D3	Stanislaus United Cruisers	0
MLS	San Jose Earthquakes	5
A-L	Richmond Kickers	3
MLS	Colorado Rapids	0
PDL	Chicago Sockers	0 (7)
MLS	Kansas City Wizards (ASDET, PSO)	0 (6)
MLS	Chicago Fire	4
D3	Texas Rattlers	0
A-L	Minnesota Thunder	7
USASA	Mexico SC	0
MLS	Dallas Burn	3
A-L	Tennessee Rhythm	0
PDL	Cape Cod Crusaders	0
MLS	Columbus Crew	2
A-L	Hampton Roads Mariners	3
D3	Northern Virginia Royals	2
D3	Wilmington Hammerheads	1
MLS	MetroStars	2
MLS	Tampa Bay Mutiny (ASDET)	1
USASA	Uruguay SC	0
A-L	Charleston Battery	0
MLS	D.C. United	4
A-L	Pittsburgh Riverhounds	1
A-L	Rochester Rhinos	2
MLS	New England Revolution	0
PDL	Mid Michigan Bucks	1
MLS	Miami Fusion	6
D3	New Jersey Stallions	1

Third Round
A-L	San Diego Flash	0
MLS	Los Angeles Galaxy	2
MLS	San Jose Earthquakes	2
A-L	Richmond Kickers	0
PDL	Chicago Sockers	0
MLS	Chicago Fire	1
A-L	Minnesota Thunder	0
MLS	Dallas Burn	2
MLS	Columbus Crew	4
A-L	Hampton Roads Mariners	1
MLS	MetroStars	3
MLS	Tampa Bay Mutiny	0
MLS	D.C. United	3
A-L	Rochester Rhinos	0
PDL	Mid Michigan Bucks	3 (5)
MLS	Miami Fusion (ASDET, PSO)	3 (6)

Quarterfinals
MLS	Los Angeles Galaxy	2
MLS	San Jose Earthquakes	0
MLS	Chicago Fire	5
MLS	Dallas Burn	1
MLS	Columbus Crew (ASDET, PSO)	1 (6)
MLS	MetroStars	1 (7)
MLS	D.C. United	2
MLS	Miami Fusion (ASDET)	3

Semifinals
MLS	Los Angeles Galaxy (ASDET)	1
MLS	Chicago Fire	2
MLS	MetroStars	2
MLS	Miami Fusion	3

Finals
MLS	Chicago Fire	2
MLS	Miami Fusion	1

== Schedule ==
Note: Scorelines use the standard U.S. convention of placing the home team on the right-hand side of box scores.

=== First round ===
Four PDL and four USASA teams start.

June 4, 2000	Mexico SC (USASA)	3–2	San Gabriel Valley Highlanders (PDL)	Glendale, California
		(Report)		Stadium: Glendale High School; Attendance: -- Referee: Eugene Selivanov (USA)

June 5, 2000	Uruguay SC (USASA)	2–1	Central Florida Kraze (PDL)	Kissimmee, Florida
	Gustavo Britos 13'; Carlos Vasquez 77'	(Report)	Marcelo Cerminato 7'	Stadium: Eagle Stadium; Attendance: 272; Referee: Roger Sill (USA)

June 6, 2000	Milwaukee Bavarians (USASA)	0–3	Chicago Sockers (PDL)	Arlington Heights, Illinois
		(Report)		Stadium: Forest View Park; Attendance: -- Referee: Ricardo Salazar (USA)

June 6, 2000	Jerry D's (USASA)	0–6	Mid Michigan Bucks (PDL)	Saginaw Township, Michigan
		(Report)	Joe Malachino 12'; David Hall 32', 42'; Boniventure Marti 39', 60'; Paul Snape 82'	Stadium: White Pine Stadium; Attendance: 290; Referee: John Paul Spicer (USA)

=== Second round ===
Twelve MLS, nine A-League, seven D3 Pro League teams enter.

June 13, 2000	San Diego Flash (A-League)	2–1	Riverside County Elite (D3 Pro)	Hemet, California
	Carlos Farias 56'; Shandley Phillips 60'	(Report)	34' Joe Owen	Stadium: West Valley HS Stadium; Attendance: 548; Referee: Kevin Stott (USA); Emiliano Monje (USA)

June 14, 2000	Rochester Raging Rhinos (A-League)	2–1	Pittsburgh Riverhounds (A-League)	Bethel Park, Pennsylvania
	Martin Nash 15'; Onandi Lowe 74'	(Report)	Phil Karn 20'	Stadium: Bethel Park Stadium; Attendance: 1,626; Referee: Brian Fenlon (USA); JR Perdue (USA)

June 14, 2000	Northern Virginia Royals (D3 Pro)	2–3	Hampton Roads Mariners (A-League)	Virginia Beach, Virginia
	Richard Engelfried 4'; Mark Vita 88'	(Report)	Michael Lawrence 46'; Jeff Clarke 53'; Chris Scrofani 64'	Stadium: Virginia Beach Sportsplex; Attendance: 680; Referee: Thomas Perry (USA); Daniel Stead (USA)

June 14, 2000	Mexico SC (USASA)	0–7	Minnesota Thunder (A-League)	St. Paul, Minnesota
		(Report)	Johnny Menyongar 8', 20', 68'; Stoian Mladenov 45'; Gerard Lagos 48'; Paul Schneider 55'; Morgan Zeba 60'	Stadium: Macalester College; Attendance: 1,209; Referee: Richard Huber (USA); Siavosh Rahimi (USA)

June 14, 2000	MetroStars (MLS)	2–1	Wilmington Hammerheads (D3 Pro)	Wilmington, North Carolina
	Mark Chung 39'; Clint Mathis 43'	(Report)	67' Willie Files 67'	Stadium: Legion Stadium; Attendance: 5,426; Referee: Kermit Quisenberry (USA); Glenn Prechac (USA)

June 14, 2000	Kansas City Wizards (MLS)	0–0 (asdet) (6–7 p)	Chicago Sockers (PDL)	Arlington Heights, Illinois
		(Report)		Stadium: Forest View Park; Attendance: 3,140; Referee: Michael Kennedy (USA); Marcel Yonan (USA)
	Penalties
	Preki (penalty scored); Peter Vermes (penalty scored); Chris Brown (penalty missed); Kerry Zavagnin (penalty scored); Chris Klein (penalty scored); Gary Glasgow (penalty scored); Chris Henderson (penalty scored); Uche Okafor (penalty missed)		(penalty scored) Rodrigo Costa; (penalty scored) David Lara; (penalty missed) John Collins; (penalty scored) Tim Regan; (penalty scored) Joe Carver; (penalty scored) Eric Wilson; (penalty scored) Matt Bobo; (penalty scored) Jason Baker

June 14, 2000	Mid Michigan Bucks (PDL)	1–0	New England Revolution (MLS)	Foxborough, Massachusetts
	Chad Schomaker 90'	(Report)		Stadium: Foxboro Stadium; Attendance: 1,857; Referee: Gus St. Silva (USA); Peter Kokolski (USA)

June 14, 2000	San Jose Earthquakes (MLS)	5–0	Stanislaus United Cruisers (D3 Pro)	Modesto, California
	Harut Karapetyan 26'; Ian Russell 61' 71'; Abdul Thompson Conteh 75' 88'	(Report)		Stadium: Central Catholic High School; Attendance: 3,600; Referee: David Bragg (USA); Kari Seitz (USA)

June 14, 2000	New Jersey Stallions (D3 Pro)	1–6	Miami Fusion (MLS)	Fort Lauderdale, Florida
	Julio Cesar Dos Santos 83'	(Report)	Nelson Vargas 13'; Welton 27', 40', 48', 71'; Diego Serna 88'	Stadium: Lockhart Stadium; Attendance: 500; Referee: Reggie Rutty (USA); Brian Poeschel (USA)

June 14, 2000	Colorado Rapids (MLS)	0–3	Richmond Kickers (A-League)	Richmond, Virginia
		(Report)	Gregory Messam 66'; Keith Donohue 74'; Tony Williams 77'	Stadium: Richmond City Stadium; Attendance: 1,244; Referee: Gerry Corrie (USA); Noel Kenny (USA)

June 14, 2000	Uruguay SC (USASA)	0–1 (asdet)	Tampa Bay Mutiny (MLS)	Tampa, Florida
		(Report)	94' Mamadou Diallo	Stadium: USF Soccer Stadium; Attendance: 515; Referee: Roger Sill (USA); Robert Mann (USA)

June 14, 2000	Texas Rattlers (D3 Pro)	0–4	Chicago Fire (MLS)	Arlington Heights, Illinois
		(Report)	Ante Razov 18', 61'; Own goal 27'; Dema Kovalenko 87'	Stadium: Forest View Park; Attendance: 3,140; Referee: Sergio Vega (USA); Ted Covaciu (USA)

June 14, 2000	Columbus Crew (MLS)	2–0	Cape Cod Crusaders (D3 Pro)	South Yarmouth, Massachusetts
	Brian West 46'; Roland Aguilera 55'	(Report)		Stadium: Alan Carson Field; Attendance: 848; Referee: Richard Eddy (USA); Kenneth Heller (USA)

June 14, 2000	Tennessee Rhythm (A-League)	0–3	Dallas Burn (MLS)	Dallas, Texas
		(Report)	Chad Deering 27', 75'; Lazo Alavanja 72'	Stadium: Cotton Bowl; Attendance: 477; Referee: Alex Prus (USA); Kevin Terry (USA)

June 14, 2000	D.C. United (MLS)	4–0	Charleston Battery (A-League)	Charleston, South Carolina
	Jaime Moreno 62'; Raúl Díaz Arce 67', 78', 84'	(Report)		Stadium: Blackbaud Stadium; Attendance: 3,672; Referee: Terry Vaughn (USA); Misail Tsapos (USA)

June 14, 2000	Seattle Sounders (A-League)	1–2	Los Angeles Galaxy (MLS)	Fullerton, California
	Greg Howes 48'	(Report)	Greg Vanney 23'; Cobi Jones 90'	Stadium: Titan Stadium; Attendance: 3,063; Referee: Kevin Stott (USA); Raymundo Prisco (USA)

=== Third round ===
July 19, 2000	Hampton Roads Mariners (A-League)	1–4	Columbus Crew (MLS)	Columbus, Ohio
	Jakob Fenger 39'	(Report)	Miles Joseph 25'; Jason Farrell 30'; Mike Duhaney 60'; Dominic Schell 90'	Stadium: Crew Stadium; Attendance: 3,036; Referee: Kevin Stott (USA); Raymundo Prisco (USA)

July 25, 2000	Tampa Bay Mutiny (MLS)	0–3	MetroStars (MLS)	Uniondale, New York
		(Report)	Mark Chung 23'; Alex Comas 31'; Clint Mathis 51'	Stadium: Mitchel Athletic Complex; Attendance: 5,183; Referee: Gus St. Silva (USA); Peter Kokolski (USA)

July 25, 2000	Chicago Fire (MLS)	1–0	Chicago Sockers (PDL)	Arlington Heights, Illinois
	Josh Wolff 22'	(Report)		Stadium: Forest View Park; Attendance: 5,127; Referee: Michael Kennedy (USA); Reggie Rutty (USA)

July 25, 2000	Miami Fusion (MLS)	3–3 (asdet) (6–5 p)	Mid Michigan Bucks (PDL)	Saginaw Township, Michigan
	Martín Machón 60'; Diego Serna 65'; Andy Williams 82'	(Report)	Joe Malachino 53'; Sam Piraine 79'; Boniventure Maruti 88'	Stadium: White Pine Stadium; Attendance: 4,006; Referee: Gerry Corrie (USA); Noel Kenny (USA)
	Penalties
	Henry Gutierrez scored Jim Rooney scored Martín Machón scored Jay Heaps scored Tyrone Marshall scored Pablo Mastroeni scored		Paul Snape scored David Hall scored Joe Piraine scored Anthonsen scored Adam Heinemann scored Eric Pogue missed

July 25, 2000	Dallas Burn (MLS)	2–0	Minnesota Thunder (A-League)	Blaine, Minnesota
	Jason Kreis 36'; Lazo Alavanja 88'	(Report)		Stadium: National Sports Center; Attendance: 3,110; Referee: Terry Vaughn (USA); Sia Rahimi (USA)

July 25, 2000	Richmond Kickers (A-League)	0–2	San Jose Earthquakes (MLS)	San Jose, California
		(Report)	Scott Bower 15'; Ian Russell 79'	Stadium: Spartan Stadium; Attendance: 1,021; Referee: Kevin Stott (USA); Richard Heron (USA)

July 25, 2000	Los Angeles Galaxy (MLS)	2–0	San Diego Flash (A-League)	San Diego, California
	Sasha Victorine 50'; Ivan Polic 67'	(Report)		Stadium: Douglas Stadium; Attendance: 6,118; Referee: Sergio Vega (USA); Misail Tsapos (USA)

July 26, 2000	Rochester Raging Rhinos (A-League)	0–3	D.C. United (MLS)	Washington, D.C.
		(Report)	Chris Albright 12', 89'; Jaime Moreno 59'	Stadium: RFK Stadium; Attendance: 3,186; Referee: Gerry Corrie (USA); Noel Kenny (USA)

=== Quarterfinals ===
August 9, 2000	Miami Fusion (MLS)	3–2 (asdet)	D.C. United (MLS)	Washington, D.C.
	Eddie Pope 5' (og); Diego Serna 43'; Jim Rooney 112'	(Report)	Jaime Moreno 42'; Jaime Moreno 65' (pen)	Stadium: RFK Stadium; Attendance: 3,864; Referee: Sergio Vega (USA); Misail Tsapos (USA)

August 9, 2000	Dallas Burn (MLS)	1–5	Chicago Fire (MLS)	Naperville, Illinois
	Chad Deering 82'	(Report)	Josh Wolff 2', 47', 72', 87'; Dema Kovalenko 9'	Stadium: Cardinal Stadium; Attendance: 7,096; Referee: Terry Vaughn (USA); Ricardo Salazar (USA)

August 9, 2000	MetroStars (MLS)	1–1 (asdet) (7–6 p)	Columbus Crew (MLS)	Columbus, Ohio
	Tab Ramos 62'	(Report)	Brian McBride 74'	Stadium: Crew Stadium; Attendance: 7,096; Referee: Noel Kenny (USA); Gerry Corrie (USA)
	Penalties
	Adolfo Valencia scored Billy Walsh scored Mark Chung scored Steve Jolley scored Tab Ramos saved Ramiro Corrales scored Steve Shak scored Mike Petke scored		Robert Warzycha scored Brian McBride scored John Wilmar Perez scored Miles Joseph scored Jason Farrell saved Roland Aguilera scored Todd Yeagley scored Mike Lapper saved

August 9, 2000	San Jose Earthquakes (MLS)	0–2	Los Angeles Galaxy (MLS)	Fullerton, California
		(Report)	Mauricio Cienfuegos 77; Seth George 81'	Stadium: Titan Stadium; Attendance: 4,345; Referee: Gus St. Silva (USA); Peter Kokolski (USA)

=== Semifinals ===
August 23, 2000	Chicago Fire (MLS)	2–1 (asdet)	Los Angeles Galaxy (MLS)	Fullerton, California
	Ante Razov 85'; Josh Wolff 112'	(Report)	Cobi Jones 79'	Stadium: Titan Stadium; Attendance: 7,124; Referee: Sergio Vega (USA); Terry Vaughn (USA)

September 12, 2000	Miami Fusion (MLS)	3–2	MetroStars (MLS)	Uniondale, New York
	Andy Williams 11'; Wélton 61'; Diego Serna 63'	(Report)	Billy Walsh 40'; Adolfo Valencia 84'	Stadium: Mitchel Athletic Complex; Attendance: 3,109; Referee: Gus St. Silva (USA); Peter Kokolski (USA)

=== Final ===
October 21, 2000

Miami Fusion (MLS)	1–2	Chicago Fire (MLS)
Wélton 90'	(Report)	Stoichkov 44'; Marshall 88' (o.g.)

Soldier Field, Chicago
Attendance: 19,146
Referee: Kevin Stott (USA)

== Top scorers ==
Position	Player	Club	Goals
1	Josh Wolff	Chicago Fire	6
	Welton	Miami Fusion	6
2	Jaime Moreno	D.C. United	5
	Diego Serna	Miami Fusion	5

== See also ==
- United States Soccer Federation
- Lamar Hunt U.S. Open Cup
- Major League Soccer
- United Soccer Leagues
- USASA
- National Premier Soccer League
- 2000 National Amateur Cup
