= Christof Lindenmayer =

American soccer player and coach

Personal information
- Full name: Christof Lindenmayer
- Date of birth: April 21, 1977 (age 49)
- Place of birth: Pickerington, Ohio, United States
- Height: 5 ft 8 in (1.73 m)
- Position: Forward

Youth career
- 1996–1999: Loyola Greyhounds

Senior career*
Years	Team	Apps	(Gls)
2000–2003	Columbus Crew	0	(0)
2000	→ MLS Pro-40 (loan)	3	(0)
2001	→ Hershey Wildcats (loan)	26	(5)
2002	→ Cincinnati Riverhawks (loan)	9	(1)
2002	→ Hampton Roads Mariners (loan)	14	(1)
2004	Virginia Beach Mariners	0	(0)

Managerial career
- 2004–2006: Loyola Greyhounds (assistant)
- * Club domestic league appearances and goals

Christof Lindenmayer is an American former professional soccer player who competed for the Columbus Crew (MLS) as well as the Hershey Wildcats (A-League) and the Virginia Beach Mariners (A-League) before retiring due to chronic hamstring injuries. Lindenmayer also starred for the Loyola College (MD) men's soccer team from 1996 to 1999, where he was a two-time MAAC Player of the Year as well as being named to the NSCAA All-Region South Atlantic team in both 1998 and 1999.
