= Chris Scrofani =

American soccer player

Personal information
- Full name: Christopher Scrofani
- Place of birth: United States
- Position: Midfielder

Senior career*
Years	Team	Apps	(Gls)
1997	South Jersey Barons		
1998-2000	Virginia Beach Mariners	72	(5)
- * Club domestic league appearances and goals

Christopher Scrofani (born in the United States) is an American retired soccer player.

== Career ==
After training with English Premier League side Crystal Palace and spending a season with South Jersey Barons in the American third division, Scrofani played professionally for American second division club Virginia Beach Mariners.
