= Matthew Nelson (soccer) =

American soccer player and coach

Matt Nelson
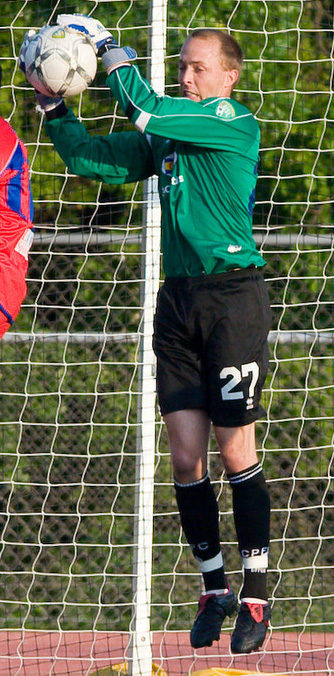

Personal information
- Full name: Matthew Nelson
- Date of birth: November 12, 1977 (age 49)
- Place of birth: Tampa, Florida, U.S.
- Height: 6 ft 1 in (1.85 m)
- Position: Goalkeeper

College career
Years	Team	Apps	(Gls)
1996–1999	Lynn Fighting Knights		

Senior career*
Years	Team	Apps	(Gls)
2000	Cape Cod Crusaders	12	(0)
2000	→ Boston Bulldogs (loan)	3	(0)
2000	→ Columbus Crew (loan)	0	(0)
2000–2001	Kilkenny City	16	(0)
2001	Portland Timbers	0	(0)
2002	South Jersey Barons	19	(0)
2002–2006	Virginia Beach Mariners	90	(0)
2007	Harrisburg City Islanders	18	(0)
2007	→ Vancouver Whitecaps (loan)	3	(0)
2008	Crystal Palace Baltimore	6	(0)
2008	Harrisburg City Islanders	0	(0)

Managerial career
- 2003–2004: Virginia Wesleyan College (assistant)
- 2005–2007: William & Mary Tribe (assistant)
- 2008–2011: Appalachian State Mountaineers (assistant)
- 2011–2015: Appalachian State Mountaineers
- * Club domestic league appearances and goals

Matthew "Matt" Nelson (born November 12, 1977) is an American retired soccer goalkeeper who was the head coach of the Appalachian State Mountaineers men's soccer team. He played professionally in the USL First Division and Major League Soccer.

== Player ==
Nelson attended Lynn University, playing on the men's soccer team from 1996 to 1999. He compiled thirty-one shutouts and forty-nine wins in fifty-nine games. He was a 1999 NSCAA Division II Scholar All American. Nelson graduated with a bachelor's degree in international business.

In 2000, Nelson began his post-collegiate career with the Cape Cod Crusaders of the USISL D3-Pro League. That season, he earned D2-Pro League Goalkeeper of the Year honors after posting a 0.73 goals against average. After the Crusaders were eliminated from the playoffs, Nelson joined the Boston Bulldogs of the USL A-League for three games, allowing only one goal. The Columbus Crew then called him up for the last two games of the Major League Soccer season. Nelson then moved to Ireland and joined Kilkenny City A.F.C. He played sixteen league games before gaining his release outside of the transfer window in April 2001. With that in hand, Nelson returned to the United States and joined the Portland Timbers but was released a month later. In 2002, he signed with the South Jersey Barons of the USL D3-Pro League. When the D3-Pro League season ended the last week of July 2002, the Hampton Roads Mariners quickly signed Nelson for the rest of the A-League season. In 2003, the Mariners became known as the Virginia Beach Mariners. Nelson stayed with the team through the 2006 season. The Mariners folded at the end of the 2006 season and Nelson signed with the Harrisburg City Islanders of the USL Second Division in 2007. That season, he recorded a league-leading ten shutouts and a 10–4–4 record. He also had the league's second best goals-against-average at 0.611 and was selected to the USL-2 All-League Second Team while backstopping the Islanders to the USL Second Division championship. On July 27, 2007, the Vancouver Whitecaps acquired Nelson on loan for the last three games of the USL First Division season. The Whitecaps wanted Nelson to play for them in 2008, but he declined. Nelson signed with Crystal Palace Baltimore in the USL Second Division on April 7, 2008. In the second round of the Lamar Hunt U.S. Open Cup Nelson saved three penalties in a penalty shoot out against his former team, the Islanders, to send Palace through to the next round against MLS side New York Red Bulls. Against the Red Bulls Nelson kept a clean sheet and made seven saves which helped send Palace through to the quarter finals of the competition against the New England Revolution. Palace released Nelson from his contract on July 18, 2008, and he was reacquired by the Harrisburg City Islanders for the remainder of the 2008 season.

== Coach ==
In 2003, Virginia Wesleyan College hired Nelson as a goalkeeper coach. In 2005, he moved to The College of William & Mary as an assistant with the women's soccer team. In 2008, Appalachian State University hired Nelson as its assistant coach to head coach Shaun Pendleton. Pendleton had coached Nelson at Lynn University. On September 7, 2011, Nelson found Pendleton dead at home. The university elevated Nelson to interim head coach for the remainder of the season. Nelson was named the Southern Conference Men's Soccer Coach of the Year and the university named him permanent head coach on December 5, 2011.
