= Ian Checcio =

American soccer player

Personal information
- Date of birth: December 20, 1975 (age 50)
- Place of birth: Philadelphia, Pennsylvania, U.S.
- Height: 5 ft 6 in (1.68 m)
- Positions: Defender; midfielder

Youth career
- 1994–1997: Rutgers Scarlet Knights

Senior career*
Years	Team	Apps	(Gls)
1998	Staten Island Vipers	12	(0)
1999	Lehigh Valley Steam	26	(1)
2000	Hampton Roads Mariners	25	(0)
2001	Atlanta Silverbacks	24	(0)
2002	Hampton Roads Mariners	27	(0)
Total		114	(1)
- * Club domestic league appearances and goals

Ian Checcio is an American retired soccer player who played professionally in the USL A-League.

Checcio played youth soccer with FC Delco. In 1994, Checcio graduated from Radnor High School where he was a multi-year letterman in baseball, basketball and soccer. Checcio attended Rutgers University, playing on the men's soccer team from 1994 to 1997. In 1998, the Staten Island Vipers selected Checcio with the last pick in the A-League Draft. Over the next five seasons, Checcio played for a different team each year. In February 2001, Checcio moved to the Atlanta Silverbacks. He finished his career in 2002 with the Hampton Roads Mariners.
