= List of NCAA Division I men's soccer career assists leaders =

In association football, or soccer, scoring a goal is the only method of scoring. The method of passing the ball to the goalscorer is considered an assist. In National Collegiate Athletic Association (NCAA) Division I soccer, where a player's career is at most four seasons long, it is considered a notable achievement to reach the 40-assist threshold. In even rarer instances, players have reached the 50 and 60-assist plateaus (no player has ever scored 70 or more goals at the Division I level).

The top 25 highest assisters in NCAA Division I men's soccer history are listed below. The NCAA did not split into its current divisions format until August 1973. From 1959 to 1971, there were no classifications to the NCAA nor its predecessor, the Intercollegiate Soccer Football Association (ISFA). Then, from 1972 to 1973, colleges were classified as either "NCAA University Division (Major College)" or "NCAA College Division (Small College)".

Below is a list of the top goalscorers in NCAA Division I men's soccer history.

== Key ==
Pos.	DF	MF	FW	Ref.
Position	Defender	Midfielder	Forward	References

*	Elected to the National Soccer Hall of Fame
Team (X)	Denotes the number of times a player from that team appears on the list

== List ==
Nat.	Player	Pos.	Team	Career start	Career end	Matches played	Assists provided	APG	Ref.
USA	Dante Washington	FW	Radford	1988	1992	88	66	0.750	
USA	Ted Rafalovich	MF	Stanford	1978	1981	85	62	0.729	
CPV	Pedro DeBrito	MF	Connecticut	1978	1981	100	59	0.590	
NGA	Chris Ogu	MF	NC State	1980	1983	79	55	0.696	
USA	Mike Fisher	FW	Virginia	1993	1996	94	55	0.585	
SER	Aleks Mihalović	MF	Jacksonville	1975	1978	66	54	0.818	
USA	Chris Goos	MF	UNC Greensboro	1999	2002	83	53	0.634	
USA	Richard Mulrooney	DF	Creighton	1995	1998	85	51	0.600	
BOL	Maurizio Rocha	MF	Connecticut (2)	1995	1998	85	51	0.600	
USA	Guillermo Jara	FW	San Diego	1992	1995	81	48	0.593	
USA	Eric Eichmann	FW	Clemson	1983	1986	88	47	0.534	
USA	Toby Taitano	FW	San Diego (2)	1990	1993	84	47	0.560	
USA	Adam Pintz	FW	Cleveland State	1955	1959	38	46	1.211	
USA	Doug Yearwood	FW	Georgia State	1981	1984	70	46	0.657	
GRE	Aris Bogdaneris	DF	South Florida	1983	1986	80	46	0.575	
USA	Bruce Murray	FW	Clemson (2)	1984	1987	84	46	0.548	
USA	Sean Shapert	FW	Indiana	1986	1989	86	46	0.535	
USA	Matt McKeon	FW	Saint Louis	1992	1995	84	46	0.548	
USA	Thomas Kain	MF	Duke	1982	1985	88	45	0.511	
USA	Steve Klein	MF	Bowling Green	1993	1996	79	45	0.570	
JAM	Andy Williams	MF	Rhode Island	1994	1997	66	45	0.682	
USA	Ben Ferry	FW	George Washington	1994	1998	63	45	0.714	
USA	Joe Casucci	FW	Niagara	1969	1972	48	44	0.917	
USA	Eric Price	MF	UC Santa Barbara	1978	1982	60	44	0.733	
USA	Todd Lindh	MF	Wofford	1979	1982	63	44	0.698	
USA	Billy Owens	MF	William & Mary	1992	1995	90	44	0.489	
USA	Damian Silvera	MF	Virginia (2)	1992	1995	98	44	0.449	
