= Craig Demmin =

Trinidad and Tobago footballer

Personal information
- Date of birth: May 21, 1971 (age 55)
- Place of birth: Arima, Trinidad and Tobago
- Height: 6 ft 2 in (1.88 m)
- Position: Defender

Youth career
- 1990–1993: Belhaven College

Senior career*
Years	Team	Apps	(Gls)
1994–1995	Trinity Pros		
1995–1997	East Fife	9	(0)
1997	Jackson Chargers		
1997	Colorado Foxes	6	(0)
1998–2000	Rochester Raging Rhinos	86	(1)
2001	Tampa Bay Mutiny	19	(0)
2002–2005	Rochester Raging Rhinos	78	(1)
2006	Virginia Beach Mariners	17	(0)
2008	Mississippi Brilla	1	(0)

International career
1995–2003	Trinidad and Tobago	7	(0)

Managerial career
- Monroe Community College (assistant)
- 2011: Rochester Lancers (assistant)
- * Club domestic league appearances and goals

Craig Demmin (born May 21, 1971) is a Trinidadian former footballer who played as a defender. He represented the Trinidad and Tobago national team.

== Player ==
=== College ===
Demmin attended Belhaven University, playing on the men's soccer team from 1990 to 1993. He was a 1991 Second Team and a 1992 and 1993 First Team NAIA All American. In 1992, Demmin and his team mates won the NAIA national men's soccer championship. In 2008, he was inducted into the school's Athletic Hall of Fame.

=== Professional ===
Demmin played for East Fife F.C. before playing in Major League Soccer for the Tampa Bay Mutiny in 2001. Demmin also had two stints with the Rochester Raging Rhinos, and was playing for the Virginia Beach Mariners at the time of their demise in 2006. Demmin was named to the A-League All-Star Team five times while playing for Rochester.

=== International ===
Demmin represented the Trinidad and Tobago national team from 1995 to 2003.

== Coach ==
Demmin is an assistant coach with the Monroe Community College women's soccer team. On August 11, 2011, the Rochester Lancers named Demmin as assistant coach.
