= Mirosław Rzepa =

Polish footballer

Personal information
- Date of birth: 27 December 1968 (age 57)
- Place of birth: Bydgoszcz, Poland
- Height: 1.82 m (6 ft 0 in)
- Position: Defender

Senior career*
Years	Team	Apps	(Gls)
1986–1994	Zawisza Bydgoszcz	149+	(1+)
1994–1995	Sokół Pniewy	33	(0)
1995–1997	Amica Wronki	24	(1)
1997–1998	Zawisza Bydgoszcz		
1998–1999	Odra/Varta Opole		
1999–2000	Odra Opole		
2000	Columbus Crew	5	(0)
2000–2001	Stomil Olsztyn	5	(0)
2001	LKS Gomunice		
2001–2002	Sparta Brodnica		
2002–2003	Chemik/Zawisza Bydgoszcz		
2003–2005	Zawisza Bydgoszcz		

International career
1992	Poland	1	(0)
- * Club domestic league appearances and goals

Mirosław Rzepa (born 27 December 1968) is a Polish former professional footballer who played as a defender.

Having started his career at Zawisza Bydgoszcz, he went on to feature for Sokół Pniewy and Amica Wronki before his first return to Zawisza. Rzepa later represented Odra Opole, Columbus Crew, Stomil Olsztyn, LKS Gomunice, Sparta Brodnica and Chemik/Zawisza Bydgoszcz. He returned to Zawisza Bydgoszcz to end his career.

He made a single appearance for the Poland national team in 1992.

== Club career ==
=== Poland ===
In 1986, Rzepa joined Zawisza Bydgoszcz and spent eight years at the club. In 1994, he spent a season at Sokół Pniewy before joining Amica Wronki for a two-year spell. In 1997, he returned to Zawisza Bydgoszcz before lining-up for Odra Opole.

=== Columbus Crew ===
In 2000, Rzepa signed for MLS club Columbus Crew. He made five appearances for the club.

=== Return to Poland ===
Rzepa returned to Poland and joined Stomil Olsztyn before the turn of the year. He played for both LKS Gomunice and Sparta Brodnica during the following season, before a move to Chemik/Zawisza Bydgoszcz in 2002. Rzepa spent the final two years of his career at his boyhood club, Zawisza Bydgoszcz.
