= Dominic Schell =

American soccer player (born 1977)

Personal information
- Date of birth: July 27, 1977 (age 49)
- Place of birth: Dallas, Texas, United States
- Height: 5 ft 7 in (1.70 m)
- Positions: Forward; midfielder

Youth career
- 1996–1999: University of Mobile

Senior career*
Years	Team	Apps	(Gls)
1996–1999	Jackson Chargers		
2000	Columbus Crew	7	(1)
2000	→ MLS Project 40 (loan)	5	(0)
2000	→ Cincinnati Riverhawks (loan)	1	(0)
2001	Nashville Metros	18	(0)
2002	El Paso Patriots	25	(2)
2005	DFW Tornados	12	(3)
2005–2006	DFW Tornados (indoor)		
2006	Dallas Roma		
2007–2008	DFW Tornados (indoor)		
2008–2009	St. Louis Illusion (indoor)	1	(1)
2008–2009	Texas Outlaws (indoor)	1	(1)
2009	Lynch's Irish Pub		
2009–2010	Texas Outlaws (indoor)	9	(7)
2010–2011	Vitesse Dallas (indoor)		
- * Club domestic league appearances and goals

Dominic Schell is an American soccer player who played professionally Major League Soccer and the USL First Division.

Schell attended the University of Mobile. In 1999, Schell and his teammates went to the NAIA national men's soccer championship where they finished runner-up to Lindsey Wilson College. Schell was an NAIA First Team All American that season.

In February 2000, the Columbus Crew selected Schell in the fifth round (57th overall) in the 2000 MLS SuperDraft. He played seven league and two Open Cup games with the Crew in addition to going on loan to the Cincinnati Riverhawks in June and the MLS Project 40. Columbus waived Schell in November 2000. On March 12, 2001, Schell signed with the Nashville Metros. In 2002, he moved to the El Paso Patriots. In 2005, he played for the DFW Tornados in the USL Premier Development League. In 2006, Schell played for the amateur Dallas Roma which upset Chivas USA in the Open Cup. During the 2008-2009 PASL season, Schell played one game each, scoring one goal a piece, for the Texas Outlaws and the St. Louis Illusion. In 2009, he played for Lynch's Irish Pub F.C. In November 2009, he joined the Texas Outlaws of the Premier Arena Soccer League. In October 2018, Schell led the celebrated Friendly FC to the second consecutive championship of the 2018 Tulsa SoktoberFest tournament outscoring fellow Roma alum Matthew Clark in the 5 game event.
