= Dante Washington =

American soccer player

Personal information
- Full name: Dante Deneen Washington
- Date of birth: November 21, 1970 (age 55)
- Place of birth: Baltimore, Maryland, U.S.
- Height: 5 ft 11 in (1.80 m)
- Position: Forward

College career
Years	Team	Apps	(Gls)
1989–1993	Radford Highlanders	66	(82)

Senior career*
Years	Team	Apps	(Gls)
1994–1995	Washington Warthogs (indoor)	47	(70)
1996	Columbus Crew	3	(0)
1996–1999	Dallas Burn	85	(24)
2000–2002	Columbus Crew	73	(28)
2003–2004	Virginia Beach Mariners	53	(35)
2004–2005	Columbus Crew	1	(0)
2005	Real Salt Lake	9	(0)
2006	Baltimore Blast (indoor)	15	(0)
Total		286	(157)

International career^{‡}
1991–1997	United States	6	(2)
- * Club domestic league appearances and goals as of 5 May 2013 ‡ National team caps and goals as of 5 May 2013

Dante Deneen Washington (born November 21, 1970) is an American former soccer player who played as a striker.

Washington played college soccer at Radford University, and was named a first team All-American in 1991. He is the NCAA career leader for assists in men's soccer.

== Playing career ==
After years in the various indoor leagues and minor outdoor leagues, he signed with MLS and the Columbus Crew midway through the inaugural 1996 season. But after only three games with the club, Dante was traded to the Dallas Burn for the rights to Brad Friedel. Washington spent the next three and a half seasons in Dallas, his best being in 1997, when he scored 12 goals. In 2000, it was off to Columbus again, traded for a draft pick. Washington scored 15 in his first season back with the Crew, but his production declined during the next two seasons and he wasn't re-signed in 2003.

Washington would spend the next two years with the Virginia Beach Mariners of the A-League. In 2004, he led the league in scoring and tied for the lead in goals. At the end of the year, Dante received a surprise call-up to the Crew and started a playoff game over the befuddled regular starter Edson Buddle. He stayed with the club through the opening of the 2005 season, but was let go when Columbus acquired Cornell Glen. He was then acquired by Real Salt Lake, in exchange for salary budget considerations sent to Columbus. In nine years of MLS play, Washington scored 52 league goals and added 30 assists. He retired from MLS following the 2005 season, but later signed with the Baltimore Blast of the MISL. Washington had played for a few years prior to his stint in the MLS with the Washington Warthogs in the CISL.

Washington played for the United States in the 1992 Summer Olympics. He earned a total of six caps for the senior team, the first coming on March 12, 1991, against Mexico. He scored on his debut and added one other goal for his country.

Washington is one of 22 college players to be part of the 40-40 club, having both 40 goals and 40 assists in their college career.

== Honors ==
=== Club ===
Dallas Burn

- U.S. Open Cup: 1997

Columbus Crew

- U.S. Open Cup: 2002

=== Individual ===
- MLS All-Star: 1997, 2000
- A-League Top Scorer: 2004
