= Mario Longo (soccer) =

American soccer player

Personal information
- Date of birth: March 12, 1980 (age 46)
- Place of birth: Durham, North Carolina, U.S.
- Height: 5 ft 11 in (1.80 m)
- Position: Midfielder

Senior career*
Years	Team	Apps	(Gls)
2000–2001	Columbus Crew	4	(0)
2000	→ MLS Pro-40 (loan)	24	(5)
2001	Cincinnati Riverhawks	10	(1)
2002	Carolina Dynamo	12	(3)
Total		50	(9)
- * Club domestic league appearances and goals

Mario Longo (born March 12, 1980) is an American former soccer player who played for Columbus Crew in the MLS.

== Career statistics ==
=== Club ===
Club	Season	League			Cup		Other		Total	
Club	Season	Division	Apps	Goals	Apps	Goals	Apps	Goals	Apps	Goals
Columbus Crew	2000	MLS	0	0	1 (Note: Appearances in the U.S. Open Cup)	0	0	0	1	0
Columbus Crew	2001	MLS	4	0	1	0	0	0	5	0
Columbus Crew	Total		4	0	2	0	0	0	6	0
MLS Pro-40 (loan)	2000	USL A-League	24	5	0	0	0	0	24	5
Cincinnati Riverhawks	2001	USL A-League	10	1	0	0	0	0	10	1
Carolina Dynamo	2002	USISL D-3 Pro League	12	3	0	0	0	0	12	3
Career total			50	9	2	0	0	0	52	9
