= Tenywa Bonseu =

Ugandan footballer (born 1976)

Personal information
- Full name: Sulaiman Tenywa Bonseu
- Date of birth: October 28, 1976 (age 49)
- Place of birth: Kampala, Uganda
- Height: 6 ft 1 in (1.85 m)
- Position: Defender

Youth career
- 1994–1996: Horizon FC

College career
Years	Team	Apps	(Gls)
1997–1998	Martin Methodist RedHawks		

Senior career*
Years	Team	Apps	(Gls)
1999–2000	Pittsburgh Riverhounds	51	(1)
2000	Chicago Fire	2	(0)
2001	Columbus Crew	24	(0)
2002–2003	Dallas Burn	47	(0)
2004	MetroStars	14	(0)
2005–2008	Rochester Rhinos	78	(2)
2009	Pittsburgh Riverhounds	14	(2)

International career
	Uganda	21	(0)
- * Club domestic league appearances and goals as of 11 October 2009

Tenywa "T-Bone" Bonseu (born October 28, 1976, in Kampala) is a retired Ugandan footballer, who played nine years of professional soccer as a defender in the United States.

== Career ==
=== Amateur and college ===
Bonseu began his career in 1994 playing for Horizon FC in his native Uganda, before coming to the United States in 1997 to attend and play college soccer for Martin Methodist College in rural Tennessee after a trial with a club in the Japanese J-League.

=== Professional ===
Bonseu joined the Pittsburgh Riverhounds of the A-League in 1999 and played there for two seasons, before signing with the Major League Soccer's Chicago Fire. Bonseu went on to spend several seasons in MLS, playing with the Columbus Crew in 2001, Dallas Burn in 2002 and 2003, and the MetroStars, who acquired Tenywa from Dallas for Steve Jolley before the 2004 season. In five seasons in MLS, Bonseu played in 87 regular season and 11 playoff games (starting all but three).

After being released by the MetroStars, Bonseu played four seasons with the Rochester Rhinos in the USL First Division from 2005 through 2008, before signing for Pittsburgh Riverhounds in 2009.

=== International ===
Bonseu was one of the youngest players ever selected to appear for the national team of Uganda. He has 21 appearances for Uganda.
