= John DeBrito =

American soccer player (1968–2020)

Personal information
- Full name: Joao Joaquim DeBrito
- Birth name: João Joaquim Gomes de Brito (Note: In this Portuguese name, the first or maternal family name is Gomes and the second or paternal family name is de Brito.)
- Date of birth: December 3, 1968
- Place of birth: Ribeira Brava, Portuguese Cape Verde
- Date of death: March 25, 2020 (aged 51)
- Place of death: Miami, Florida, U.S.
- Height: 6 ft 2 in (1.88 m)
- Positions: Defender; midfielder

Youth career
- 1987–1990: Southern Connecticut State

Senior career*
Years	Team	Apps	(Gls)
1991–1992	Tulsa Ambush (indoor)		
1992	Gremio Lusitano		
1994	Boston Storm		
1995	New York Fever	26	(11)
1996	New England Revolution	21	(0)
1997	MetroStars	8	(0)
1997–1998	Kansas City Wizards	12	(0)
1997	→ Nashville Metros (loan)	1	(0)
1998	→ MLS Pro 40 (loan)	3	(0)
1999–2001	Columbus Crew	35	(1)
2001	Dallas Burn	0	(0)
2001	Connecticut Wolves	7	(0)

International career
1991–1992	United States	6	(0)
- * Club domestic league appearances and goals

Joao Joaquim DeBrito Jr. (December 3, 1968 – March 25, 2020), known as John DeBrito, was a soccer player who played as a defender and midfielder. He was an All American at Southern Connecticut State University, spent at least one season playing indoor soccer, then played eight seasons outdoor, including six seasons in Major League Soccer. Born in Portuguese Cape Verde, he earned six caps with the United States national team from 1991 to 1992.

== Youth and college ==
DeBrito was born in Cape Verde, but attended the W.F. Kaynor Technical High School of Waterbury, Connecticut. He finished his high school soccer career as one of the highest-scoring players in state history. Following high school, DeBrito attended Division II Southern Connecticut State University where he played on the men's soccer team from 1987 to 1990. In 1988, he was named a second-team All-Star. The next year, he led the Owls to the Division II championship, scoring both Southern Conn goals in the victory. In 1990, he was a first-team All-Star. In his four years with the Owls, DeBrito scored twenty goals and dished out thirty-two assists.

== Professional ==
In 1991, the Tulsa Ambush of the National Professional Soccer League (NPSL) drafted DeBrito. He spent the 1991–1992 NPSL season with the Ambush before the team folded at the end of the season. In 1992, he joined Gremio Lusitano. In 1994, DeBrito signed with the Boston Storm of the USISL. In 1995, he moved to the New York Fever of the A League. In February 1996, the New England Revolution picked DeBrito in the eleventh round (105th overall) of the MLS Inaugural Draft. He played in twenty-one games in the 1996 season, which he played as a defender. The Revolution waived DeBrito on March 17, 1997, and was quickly claimed by the MetroStars. He played eight games with the MetroStars before moving to the Kansas City Wizards for the remainder of the 1997 and the 1998 season. In 1999, the Columbus Crew selected DeBrito in the second round of the Supplemental Draft. DeBrito remained with the Crew through the 1999 and 2000 season before being traded to the Dallas Burn during the 2001 season. DeBrito played for the Burn in the U.S. Open Cup, but never saw time in any league games before being released by Dallas on July 1, 2001. DeBrito finished out the 2001 season with the Connecticut Wolves of USISL.

== National team ==
DeBrito earned six caps with the U.S. national team. His first game came as a substitute to Marcelo Balboa in a 1–0 loss to Bermuda on February 21, 1991. He was not called into the national team again until February 12, 1992, this time starting alongside Balboa in a scoreless tie with Costa Rica. Over the next eight months, he appeared in a handful of games, most as substitutes until his last cap on October 9, 1992. In 1993 DeBrito played with the U.S. at the World University Games.

In 2006, the Connecticut Soccer Hall of Fame inducted DeBrito.

== Personal life ==
DeBrito's parents were John and Angelina DeBrito. He had five sisters: Vera, Fernanda, Valeriana, Angela, and Maria. His older brother, Pedro DeBrito, was also a professional soccer player in the 1980s and 1990s. DeBrito died in 2020.
