= Mike Clark (soccer) =

American soccer player

Personal information
- Full name: Michael Clark
- Date of birth: December 16, 1972 (age 53)
- Place of birth: Indianapolis, Indiana, U.S.
- Height: 6 ft 0 in (1.83 m)
- Position: Defender

Youth career
- 1991–1994: Indiana University

Senior career*
Years	Team	Apps	(Gls)
1995	Richmond Kickers		
1996–2003	Columbus Crew	221	(3)
- * Club domestic league appearances and goals

Mike Clark (born December 16, 1972) is an American retired soccer defender who spent eight seasons with the Columbus Crew in Major League Soccer.

Clark attended Detroit Country Day High School and was a Parade Magazine High School All American soccer player. He then attended Indiana University where he was team captain, starting every game and a mainstay on the Hoosiers soccer team from 1991 to 1994. He started 91 games during his four seasons and was selected as a 1994 third team All American.

In 1995, he signed with the Richmond Kickers of the USISL. That season, the Kickers won both the USISL and Open Cup championships. In February 1996, the Columbus Crew selected Clark in the fourth round (thirty-first overall) in the 1996 MLS Inaugural Player Draft. He is the most capped player for the Crew and was also voted to two MLS All-Star Games. He retired on March 16, 2004, holding the Crew record for games played, minutes played and games started. He also played 22 playoff and 18 U.S. Open Cup games.

== Honors ==
=== Club ===
Columbus Crew

- Lamar Hunt U.S. Open Cup: 2002

=== Individual ===
- MLS All-Star: 2000
