= Pato Aguilera =

Bolivian footballer (born 1979)

Roland Vargas-Aguilera
Personal information
- Full name: Roland Vargas-Aguilera
- Date of birth: December 7, 1979 (age 46)
- Place of birth: Santa Cruz de la Sierra, Bolivia
- Height: 5 ft 8 in (1.73 m)
- Position: Midfielder

Youth career
- Academia Tahuichi Aguilera

Senior career*
Years	Team	Apps	(Gls)
1998–1999	Blooming		
2000–2001	Columbus Crew	18	(0)
2001–2002	Oriente Petrolero		
2001	New England Revolution	1	(0)
2003–2004	Virginia Beach Mariners	26	(10)
2004–2005	Rochester Raging Rhinos	43	(6)
2006	Virginia Beach Mariners	11	(0)
2007	Huracán del Paso	11	(2)
2008	Montreal Impact	23	(1)
2008	→ Trois-Rivieres Attak (loan)	2	(2)
2009	Cleveland City Stars	29	(3)
2010	TTM Phichit	20	(2)
2011	Chiangrai United F.C.	20	(4)
2012	PTT Rayong F.C.	30	(6)
2013	Phuket F.C.	20	(4)
2019	Virginia Beach United	10	(1)
- * Club domestic league appearances and goals as of 2014

Roland "Pato" Vargas-Aguilera (born December 7, 1979, in Santa Cruz de la Sierra) is a Bolivian retired professional footballer who played as a midfielder.

== Career ==
=== Youth ===
Aguilera began his career in his native Bolivia, attending the prestigious Tahuichi Academy (which also produced Marco Etcheverry and Jaime Moreno), before moving to the United States to play soccer in 2000.

=== Professional ===
Aguilera was drafted in the 2000 MLS SuperDraft by the Columbus Crew. He went on to play for several teams in both Major League Soccer and the USL First Division, spending extended periods of time with the Virginia Beach Mariners and the Rochester Raging Rhinos.

In 2008 and played in 23 matches for the Montreal Impact. In 2008, he was loaned to the Impact's farm team the Trois-Rivières Attak of the Canadian Soccer League where he made his debut on June 27, 2008, in a 4–0 victory over TFC Academy. He recorded his first and second goal for Attak the next day on June 28 against TFC Academy in a 3–0 victory. On December 2, 2008, Impact announced the release of Aguilera.

He subsequently signed for the newly promoted USL First Division side Cleveland City Stars for the 2009 season.
