= Billy Walsh (soccer, born 1972) =

American soccer player and coach

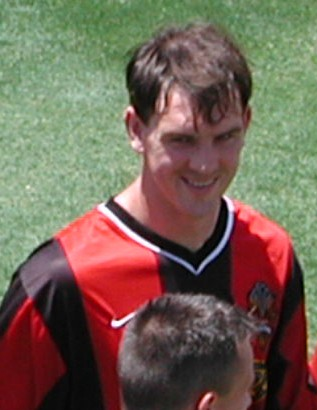

Personal information
- Date of birth: October 7, 1975 (age 51)
- Place of birth: Chatham Township, New Jersey, U.S.
- Height: 6 ft 3 in (1.91 m)
- Position: Midfielder

College career
Years	Team	Apps	(Gls)
1994–1996	Virginia Cavaliers		
1997	Rutgers Scarlet Knights		

Senior career*
Years	Team	Apps	(Gls)
1998–2001	MetroStars	73	(10)
1998	→ MLS Pro 40 (loan)	9	(1)
2002	Chicago Fire	13	(0)

International career
1999	United States	1	(0)

Managerial career
- 2000–2004: Manhattan Jaspers
- * Club domestic league appearances and goals

Billy Walsh (born October 7, 1975) is a former American soccer player and coach.

Walsh played high school soccer at Chatham High School. In 1999, he was named by The Star-Ledger as one of the top ten New Jersey high school soccer players of the 1990s.

Walsh played college soccer at the University of Virginia and Rutgers. In 1996, he was the only collegian on the U.S. team that competed in the Atlanta Olympics.

Walsh was drafted by the MetroStars of Major League Soccer in the second round of the 1998 MLS College Draft. He played four years for the club, mostly at defensive midfielder, and was named the team MVP in 1999. After the 2001 season, he was waived and spent 2002 with the Chicago Fire.

Walsh did receive his lone cap for the senior U.S. national team as a last-minute sub against Jamaica on September 8, 1999.

After ending his career as a player, Walsh coached his alma mater Chatham High School in Chatham Township, New Jersey, as well as Manhattan College.
