= Mike Lapper =

American soccer player

Personal information
- Full name: Michael Steven Lapper
- Date of birth: August 28, 1970 (age 56)
- Place of birth: Redondo Beach, California, United States
- Height: 6 ft 0 in (1.83 m)
- Position: Defender

Youth career
- North Huntington Beach Untouchables

College career
Years	Team	Apps	(Gls)
1988–1991	UCLA Bruins		

Senior career*
Years	Team	Apps	(Gls)
1988–1989	Los Angeles Heat	16	(2)
1994–1995	VfL Wolfsburg	16	(1)
1995–1997	Southend United	52	(1)
1997–2002	Columbus Crew	110	(5)
Total		194	(9)

International career
1991–1995	United States	43	(1)

Managerial career
- 2005–2013: Columbus Crew (assistant)
- 2013–2017: West Virginia Mountaineers (assistant)
- 2018–2019: New England Revolution (assistant)
- 2019: New England Revolution (interim)
- * Club domestic league appearances and goals

Michael Steven Lapper (born August 28, 1970, in Redondo Beach, California) is an American retired soccer defender. During his fifteen-year playing career, most of it spent as a sweeper, he played in England, Germany and the United States. He earned 44 caps, scoring one goal, with the U.S. national soccer team between 1991 and 1995. He was part of the U.S. teams at both the 1992 Summer Olympics and the 1994 FIFA World Cup.

== Player ==
=== Youth ===
Lapper was born to German parents, He played youth soccer in the North Huntington Beach Untouchables youth club. He graduated from Marina High in Huntington Beach. He played collegiate soccer at UCLA from 1988 to 1991. While a Bruin, Lapper won the 1990 National Championship, earning first team All American honors. In college, he also played with the local Los Angeles Heat of the Western Soccer League in 1988 and 1989. He was a WSL First Team All-Star in 1989.

== International ==
Lapper made his debut for the United States on April 7, 1991, against South Korea.

Lapper played for the U.S. 1991 Pan American Games gold medal soccer team, the 1992 Summer Olympics soccer team, and the 1995 Copa America team, which placed fourth at that tournament. In 1993, he played every U.S. game as a sweeper. When Bora Milutinović moved to a flat-back four defensive scheme, Lapper found himself relegated to the bench in favor of Alexi Lalas. However, he did make the U.S. team which played as host in the 1994 FIFA World Cup. This team advanced to the second round, where it lost to Brazil, but Lapper failed to enter any of the U.S. games.

He played several more matches at the end of 1994 and into 1995, but on August 16, 1995, he earned his last cap in a losing match to Sweden. He ended his national team career with 44 and scored one goal.

=== Europe ===
Lapper began his professional career in 1994 with German Second Division club VfL Wolfsburg in Germany (1994–95). He scored in his debut game with that team. He continued to start for Wolfsburg until coach Eckhard Krautzun, who had sought Lapper's services, was fired by team management. Lapper soon found himself in the position of many American players in Europe during those years. The new manager, Gerd Roggensack, had no interest in American soccer players, and Lapper found himself unable to even make the substitute list. At the time that Krautzun was fired, Wolfsburg stood at the top of the German Second Division. By the end of the season, it had slipped to fourth and failed to win promotion to the First Division. Lapper requested a transfer and in 1995, the team sent him to British Second Division club Southend United for £100,000. At the time, Southend was pushing for promotion to the premiership, but when it actually faced demotion to the second division in 1997, Lapper left Southend to sign with Major League Soccer (MLS). However, he did have a final stint within English soccer, when Halifax Town signed him on a rolling contract in late 1999. His time at the club proved unsuccessful and he soon returned to the U.S.

=== Major League Soccer ===
When Lapper signed with MLS, the league allocated him in June 1997 to the Columbus Crew. With that team, he played 110 games, starting 99, until his retirement in 2002. He scored five goals and assisted on 10 more.

== Post-playing career ==
After retiring from playing, he joined the Columbus Crew's front office as the Director of Soccer Business Development, which focuses on the growth of the Crew's camps, clinics and soccer academies. During the 2005, season, he officially joined the coaching staff. Following the 2013 MLS season, Lapper parted ways with the Crew and became a member of the West Virginia University men's soccer staff. In 2019, he was the New England Revolution's interim manager after Brad Friedel was fired.

Lapper now lives in New Albany with his wife and two sons. He started a power washing business and is very active in the local community.

== Honors ==
UCLA

- National Championship: 1990

Columbus Crew

As a player

- US Open Cup: 2002

As an assistant coach

- MLS Cup: 2008

US national team

- gold medal 1992 Summer Olympics
