= John Wilmar Pérez =

Colombian footballer (born 1970)

Personal information
- Full name: John Wilmar Pérez Múñoz
- Date of birth: 21 February 1970 (age 56)
- Place of birth: Medellin, Colombia
- Height: 1.69 m (5 ft 6 1/2 in)
- Position: Midfielder

Senior career*
Years	Team	Apps	(Gls)
1991–1996	Independiente Medellín		
1996–1999	Deportivo Cali		
2000–2002	Columbus Crew	75	(12)
2003	Independiente Medellín		

International career
1997–2000	Colombia	19	(0)
- * Club domestic league appearances and goals

John Wilmar Pérez Muñoz (born 21 February 1970) is a former Colombian football (soccer) player.

A central midfielder, effective in winning the ball and passing it forward, Pérez played for the Colombian clubs Independiente Medellín and Deportivo Cali. In 2000, he moved to the Columbus Crew in the United States. After a slow first season in Columbus, Pérez excelled in 2001 while forming the core of a sturdy midfield next to Brian Maisonneuve. He finished the year with 8 goals and 15 assists, earning recognition as the club's Most Valuable Player for the season. In 2002, Pérez experienced a decline in his statistics and playing time, but nonetheless helped the Crew win their first trophy, the Lamar Hunt U.S. Open Cup.

Pérez also represented the Colombia national team and was a participant at the 1992 Summer Olympics, 1997 Copa America, and 1998 FIFA World Cup. He played in all four of Colombia's matches at the Copa America in 1997, but remained on the bench throughout the World Cup the following year.

== Honors ==
=== Club ===
Columbus Crew

- Lamar Hunt U.S. Open Cup: 2002
