= Brian West (soccer) =

American soccer player

Personal information
- Full name: Brian West
- Date of birth: June 10, 1978 (age 48)
- Place of birth: LaGrange, Georgia, United States
- Height: 5 ft 9 in (1.75 m)
- Position: Midfielder

Youth career
- 1996–1997: Virginia Cavaliers

Senior career*
| Years | Team | Apps | (Gls) |
| 1998–2003 | Columbus Crew | 132 | (18) |
| 1998 | → MLS Pro-40 (loan) | 6 | (1) |
| 2004–2008 | Fredrikstad FK | 53 | (12) |

International career
| 2000–2002 | United States | 7 | (0) |
- * Club domestic league appearances and goals

Brian West (born June 10, 1978, in LaGrange, Georgia) is an American retired soccer striker.

== Club career ==
West played two years of college soccer at the University of Virginia. He left after his sophomore year, becoming one of the first Project-40 players in Major League Soccer. West would go on to play six years for the Columbus Crew, scoring 18 league goals and 29 assists in the process.

Brian became the first Project-40 player to graduate from college, earning his degree in Information Systems from Ohio State University. He left MLS after the 2003 season for a transfer to Norway. He is now retired due to injury troubles and has settled down in Fredrikstad where he works in the stock market.

== International career ==
West made his debut with the US national team on April 26, 2000, against Russia. He played his last international match on April 3, 2002, a 1–0 home win over Mexico.

== Honours ==
=== Club ===
Columbus Crew

- Lamar Hunt U.S. Open Cup: 2002

Fredrikstad FK

- Norwegian football cup: 2006
