= Phil Karn (soccer) =

American soccer player

Personal information
- Date of birth: June 3, 1975 (age 51)
- Place of birth: Roslyn, Pennsylvania, U.S.
- Height: 5 ft 8 in (1.73 m)
- Positions: Midfielder; forward

Youth career
- 1994–1995: Drexel Dragons
- 1996–1997: Penn State Nittany Lions

Senior career*
Years	Team	Apps	(Gls)
1998	Reading Rage		(14)
1999–2002	Pittsburgh Riverhounds	95	(23)
2003	Reading United	3	(0)
- * Club domestic league appearances and goals

Phil Karn is an American retired soccer player who played professionally in the USL A-League.

In 1994, Karn graduated from Abington High School. In 1994, Karn began his collegiate career at Drexel University. He transferred to Penn State University in 1996. In 1998, Karn turned professional with Reading Rage of the USISL D-3 Pro League, earning Second Team All League. His fourteen goals that season led to his moving up to the Pittsburgh Riverhounds of the USL A-League. Karn spent four seasons with the Riverhounds, then returned to Reading for the 2003 season. In February 2001, the Columbus Crew selected Karn in the sixth round (63rd overall), but was released on March 19, 2001.

He is the assistant youth director for the Philadelphia Union.
