= Mike Duhaney =

American soccer player

Personal information
- Date of birth: April 5, 1974 (age 52)
- Place of birth: Connecticut, United States
- Height: 5 ft 11 in (1.80 m)
- Position: Defender

Youth career
- 1992–1994: UNLV Rebels

Senior career*
Years	Team	Apps	(Gls)
1996–1998	Tampa Bay Mutiny	43	(0)
1998–1999	MetroStars	33	(2)
2000–2001	Columbus Crew	45	(2)
2002–2003	Mainz 05	14	(0)
Total		135	(4)

International career
1994–1995	United States U23		
- * Club domestic league appearances and goals

Mike Duhaney (born April 5, 1974) is an American retired professional soccer player who played in Major League Soccer (MLS) and the 2. Bundesliga. He was the 1997 Major League Soccer Rookie of the Year.

== Career ==
Duhaney played college soccer at the University of Nevada, Las Vegas from 1992 to 1994, where he was named first-team All-Conference in 1994. Upon graduating in 1994, he spent all of 1995 training full-time with the U.S. U-23 Olympic team. He also played four games for the U.S. team at the 1995 Pan American Games.

Duhaney was selected eighty-seventh overall in the 1996 MLS Inaugural Player Draft by the Tampa Bay Mutiny. He lost the entire 1996 season due to a knee injury. In 1997, he seized the Mutiny's left back position and started twenty-five games, earning MLS Rookie of the Year.

In June 1998, Duhaney was traded midway into the next season to the MetroStars in exchange for Paul Dougherty after the MetroStars backline was decimated by injuries. Although he saw a good deal of playing time with the Metros, he never settled in.

On January 28, 2000, was traded to the Columbus Crew in exchange for Thomas Dooley. Duhaney stayed in Columbus for two years, starting thirty-nine games for the team, but decided not to return after the 2001 season.

In 2002, Duhaney signed with 2. Bundesliga team 1. FSV Mainz 05.

== Honors ==
Individual

- MLS Rookie of the Year: 1997
