= Cincinnati Riverhawks =

Soccer team in Ohio, US

- Full name: Cincinnati Riverhawks Soccer Club
- Nickname: Hawks
- Founded: 1997
- Dissolved: 2003
- Stadium: Galbreath Field; Kings Mills, Ohio
- Capacity: 10,000
- Owner(s): Cincinnati Soccer Club
- League: USISL PDL (1997); USL A-League (1998–2003)
Home colors	Away colors

The Cincinnati Riverhawks were a professional soccer team that debuted in the USISL Premier Development League in 1997 and joined the A-League from 1998 to 2003. They played their games at Galbreath Field in Kings Mills, Ohio, and later at the Hamilton County Fairgrounds and at the Town and Country Sports Complex in Wilder, KY. The Riverhawks were disbanded following the 2003 season.

== History ==
The Cincinnati Riverhawks were a professional soccer team from Cincinnati, Ohio, owned by the Cincinnati Soccer Club. The team initially played in the USISL Premier Development League Mid-South Division in 1997. The team finished the 1997 season in first place in its division, winning ten and losing five matches. The team advanced to the second round of the playoffs, before losing to its division rival, the Jackson Chargers. In 1998, the Riverhawks joined the A-League's Central Division. The squad finished in fifth place in its division, with eleven wins and seventeen losses. Before the start of the 1999 season, the United Systems of Independent Soccer Leagues (USISL) became the United Soccer Leagues (USL).

The Riverhawks remained in the organization's A-League, Central Division, finishing last in its division, with a record of seven losses and twenty-one ties. The next season the Riverhawks again finished last in the Central Division, with a record of two wins, twenty-three losses, and three ties. The team continued its poor showing in the 2001 season, finishing last in its division, while winning just six and losing twenty matches. In the 2002 season, the Riverhawks finished in third place in its division, one place ahead of last place. The team won eight and lost twenty matches. The Riverhawks repeated its performance of remaining out of last place by a single spot during the 2003 season. Still, after repeated disappointing performances, the Cincinnati Riverhawks disbanded following the 2003 season.

== Colors & Badge ==
The Riverhawks debuted with their original logo and primary colors (white, royal blue, gold) in the 1997 season but would later change their logo for the 2001 and 2002 seasons.

Original Riverhawks logo 1997-2000

Riverhawks logo 2001

== Year-by-year ==
Year	Division	League	Reg. season	Playoffs	Open Cup
1997	"4"	USISL PDSL	1st, Mid-South	Division Finals	Did not qualify
1998	2	USISL A-League	5th, Central	Did not qualify	Did not qualify
1999	2	USL A-League	7th, Central	Did not qualify	Did not qualify
2000	2	USL A-League	6th, Central	Did not qualify	Did not qualify
2001	2	USL A-League	7th, Central	Did not qualify	Did not qualify
2002	2	USL A-League	3rd, Central	Did not qualify	Did not qualify
2003	2	USL A-League	4th, Central	Did not qualify	Did not qualify

== Coaches ==
- Nick Ranieri (1997)

== See also ==
- Cincinnati Ladyhawks
- FC Cincinnati
