= Virginia Beach Mariners =

- Full name: Virginia Beach Mariners Soccer Club
- Nickname: Mariners
- Founded: 1994
- Dissolved: March 30, 2007
- Stadium: Virginia Beach Sportsplex, 2181 Landstown Rd; Virginia Beach, Virginia, USA
- Capacity: 10,000
- League: USL First Division
- 2006: 9th
Home colors	Away colors

The Virginia Beach Mariners were an American soccer club, who formerly played in the USL First Division of the United Soccer Leagues, the second division in the US Soccer hierarchy behind Major League Soccer. On March 30, 2007 the team folded due to lack of ownership.

The Mariners played at the Virginia Beach Sportsplex in Virginia Beach, Virginia, from 1999 up to their demise in 2007.

== History ==
The team was founded in 1994 as the Hampton Roads Hurricanes, but they changed their name to Mariners after the first year. For the 2003 season, the team changed their name from Hampton Roads Mariners to the more widely recognizable Virginia Beach Mariners. The team went on a one- year hiatus in 1997, after which they joined the A-League.

In 2006, the Mariners added a USL Premier Development League club, the Virginia Beach Submariners. Shortly after the termination of the Mariners, the Submariners were taken over by the Hampton Roads Piranhas, a women's W-League soccer club, who renamed the team the Hampton Roads Piranhas to reflect the change of ownership.

== Year-by-year ==
Year	League	Reg. season	Playoffs	Open Cup
1994	USISL	5th, Atlantic	Divisional Semifinals	did not enter
1995	USISL Pro League	5th, Atlantic	Divisional Semifinals	did not qualify
1996	USISL Select League	3rd, South Atlantic	Select Six	did not qualify
1997	On Hiatus			
1998	USISL A-League	3rd, Atlantic	Conference Quarterfinals	3rd Round
1999	USL A-League	6th, Atlantic	did not qualify	did not qualify
2000	USL A-League	4th, Atlantic	Conference Quarterfinals	3rd Round
2001	On Hiatus			
2002	USL A-League	5th, Southeast	did not qualify	3rd Round
2003	USL A-League	2nd, Southeast	Division Finals	4th Round
2004	USL A-League	6th, Eastern	did not qualify	3rd Round
2005	USL First Division	11th	did not qualify	2nd Round
2006	USL First Division	9th	did not qualify	3rd Round

== Head coaches ==
- (United States) Shawn McDonald (1996 – August 2005)
- (United States) Jay Hoffman (August 2005 – 2006)

== See also ==
- USL First Division teams
