= 2005 Columbus Crew season =

Columbus Crew
2005 season
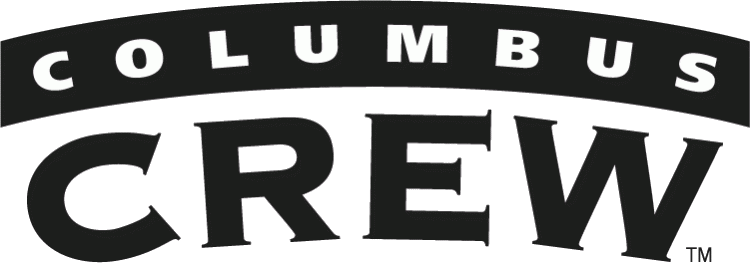
- Investor-operators: Lamar Hunt; Clark Hunt; Dan Hunt; Lamar Hunt Jr. Sharron Hunt Munson; Ron Pizzuti and a group of local investors
- Head Coach: Greg Andrulis (until July 16); Robert Warzycha (interim) (from July 16)
- Stadium: Columbus Crew Stadium
- Major League Soccer: Conference: 6th Overall: 10th
- MLS Cup playoffs: Did not qualify
- U.S. Open Cup: Fourth round
- Top goalscorer: League: Edson Buddle (9); All: Edson Buddle (9)
- Highest home attendance: 20,548 (9/30 v. CHV)
- Lowest home attendance: 9,260 (5/13 v. KC)
- Average home league attendance: 12,916 (57.3%)
- Biggest win: CLB 3–0 LA (4/2); CHV 0-3 CLB (9/3)
- Biggest defeat: CLB 0-4 KC (5/14)
| Home colors | Away colors |

The 2005 Columbus Crew season was the club's 10th season of existence and their 10th consecutive season in Major League Soccer, the top flight of soccer in the United States. The first match of the season was on April 2 against Los Angeles Galaxy. It was the fifth season under head coach Greg Andrulis who was replaced by interim head coach Robert Warzycha on July 16.

== Roster ==
As of September 28, 2005

Note: Flags indicate national team as defined under FIFA eligibility rules; some limited exceptions apply. Players may hold more than one non-FIFA nationality.

| No. | Pos. | Nation | Player |
|---|---|---|---|
| 1 | GK | USA | Jon Busch |
| 2 | DF | USA | Frankie Hejduk |
| 4 | DF | USA | Robin Fraser (captain) |
| 5 | DF | USA | Stephen Herdsman |
| 6 | DF | USA | Chris Wingert |
| 7 | DF | NZL | Simon Elliott |
| 8 | DF | NZL | Duncan Oughton |
| 9 | FW | GUA | Mario Rodríguez |
| 10 | MF | USA | Kyle Martino |
| 11 | FW | USA | John Wolyniec |
| 12 | FW | USA | Edson Buddle |
| 13 | DF | USA | Mark Schulte |
| 14 | DF | USA | Chad Marshall |
| 15 | FW | USA | Devin Barclay |
| 16 | MF | USA | Ross Paule |

| No. | Pos. | Nation | Player |
|---|---|---|---|
| 17 | MF | USA | Danny Szetela |
| 18 | MF | USA | Marcus Storey |
| 19 | MF | USA | Chris Henderson |
| 21 | MF | PAN | Luis Gallardo |
| 22 | GK | USA | Matt Jordan |
| 23 | FW | USA | David Testo |
| 26 | FW | TRI | Cornell Glen |
| 27 | FW | USA | Jamal Sutton |
| 28 | MF | USA | Domenic Mediate |
| 29 | FW | USA | Knox Cameron |
| 30 | MF | USA | Eric Vasquez |
| 31 | GK | PUR | Bill Gaudette |
| 33 | DF | USA | Ryan Kelly |
| 34 | FW | RSA | Stephen Armstrong |
| 88 | GK | USA | Jonny Walker |

== Technical Staff ==
| Position | Staff |
|---|---|
| President/General Manager | (United States) Mark McCullers |
| Head Coach | (United States) Greg Andrulis until July 17 (Poland) Robert Warzycha after July 17 |
| Assistant Coach | (Poland) Robert Warzycha until July 17 |
| Assistant Coach | (United States) Mike Lapper |
| Assistant Coach | (United States) Eduardo Carvacho |
| Head Trainer | (United States) Craig Devine |
| Team Manager | (United States) Tucker Walther |
| Equipment Manager | (United States) Matt Yoder |

== Non-competitive ==
=== Preseason ===
The Crew started preseason in Columbus and played games in Florida, Spain, Virginia and South Carolina before returning to Ohio. The Crew brought in the following trialists during training camp: Mark Schulte, Lee Morrison, Mira Mupier, Ricky Charles, Taylor Graham and Denny Clanton.

Unsigned draft picks Marcus Storey, Domenic Mediate, Knox Cameron, Matt Oliver, Bill Gaudette, Eric Vasquez and Ryan Kelly also joined the team for preseason.

| February 4 Friendly | Columbus Crew | 1-1 | U.S. U-17 National Team | Bradenton, FL |
| | Martino 73' | Report | Zimmerman 11' | Stadium: IMG Academy |
Note: Played in three 30-minute periods.

| February 5 Friendly | Columbus Crew | 0-1 | D.C. United | Bradenton, FL |
| 10:00 AM EST | | Report | Moreno 11' | Stadium: IMG Academy |

| February 7 Friendly | UCF Golden Knights | 1-3 | Columbus Crew | Bradenton, FL |
| 4:00 PM EST | Goal | Report | Razov; Wingert; Storey | Stadium: IMG Academy |

| February 8 Friendly | South Florida Bulls | 0-1 | Columbus Crew | Bradenton, FL |
| 4:00 PM EST | | Report | Cameron 21' | Stadium: IMG Academy |

| February 11 Friendly | Columbus Crew | 1-0 | NY/NJ MetroStars | Bradenton, FL |
| 11:00 AM EST | Martino 30' | Report | | Stadium: IMG Academy |
Note: Played in two 35-minute halves

| February 13 Tom Fitzgerald Memorial Soccer Festival | Columbus Crew | 0-2 | Real Salt Lake | Tampa, FL |
| 6:00 PM EST | | Report | Kreis 26', 36' | Stadium: Pepin Stadium |

| February 28 Friendly | Columbus Crew | 0-5 | Viking FK | Cartagena, Spain |
| | | Report | Goal | Stadium: La Manga Club Football Stadium |

| March 2 Friendly | Columbus Crew | 3-2 | Molde FK | Cartagena, Spain |
| 6:00 AM EST | Razov; Buddle; Storey 49' | Report | Tangedal 52'; Hoås 73' | Stadium: La Manga Club Football Stadium |

| March 4 Friendly | Columbus Crew | 0-0 | FK Bodø/Glimt | Cartagena, Spain |
| 12:30 PM EST | | Report | | Stadium: La Manga Club Football Stadium |

| March 6 Friendly | Columbus Crew | 1-5 | IK Start | Cartagena, Spain |
| 12:30 PM EST | Paule pen.' | Report | Lie | Stadium: La Manga Club Football Stadium |

| March 12 Friendly | Columbus Crew | 1-1 | Virginia Beach Mariners | Virginia Beach, VA |
| 7:30 PM EST | Paule (yellow card) 24', (goal) 82'; Szetela (yellow card) 49'; Kelly (red card) 66'; Clanton (yellow card) 90' | Report | Caskey 68' (pen.) | Stadium: Virginia Beach Sportsplex; Attendance: 944; Referee: Brian Hall; Assistant referees: Dan Stead; Chip Boatwright; Fourth official: Scott Johnson |

| March 15 Keith Evans Memorial Match | Columbus Crew | 3-0 | Cincinnati Kings | Obetz, OH |
| | Razov; Buddle; Storey | Report | | Stadium: Crew Training Center |

| March 19 Carolina Challenge Cup | Charleston Battery | 0-1 | Columbus Crew | Charleston, SC |
| 6:00 PM EST | | Report | Buddle 12' | Stadium: Blackbaud Stadium |

| March 23 Carolina Challenge Cup | Columbus Crew | 1-1 | San Jose Earthquakes | Charleston, SC |
| 5:00 PM EST | Cameron 90' | Report | Clark 45'; Cochrane (red card) | Stadium: Blackbaud Stadium; Referee: Tony Russo; Assistant referees: CJ Morgante; Bob Wern |
Note: Postponed from March 22 due to lightning

| March 25 Carolina Challenge Cup | Columbus Crew | 0-3 | D.C. United | Charleston, SC |
| 8:15 PM EST | | Report | Petke 4'; Gomez 21'; Moreno 50' | Stadium: Blackbaud Stadium |

=== Midseason ===
| April 13 Friendly | Cincinnati Kings | 1-2 | Columbus Crew | Cincinnati, OH |
| | Cummings 38' | Report | Barclay 32'; Cameron 77' | Stadium: Xavier Soccer Complex |

| April 20 Connor Senn Memorial Game | Ohio State Buckeyes | 0-0 | Columbus Crew | Columbus, OH |
| | | Report | | Stadium: Jesse Owens Memorial Stadium; Attendance: 1,222 |
Note: Match suspended at halftime due to inclement weather

| June 4 Friendly | Columbus Crew | 4-1 | Club Deportivo Universidad Católica | Columbus, OH |
| 7:30 PM EDT | Marshall 43'; Cameron 46', 60'; Glen 74' | | Acevedo 45+2' | Stadium: Columbus Crew Stadium; Attendance: 900 |

| July 27 Friendly | Columbus Crew | 2-1 | Fulham F.C. | Columbus, OH |
| | Storey 17' | Report | Wingert 45' (o.g.); Wolyniec 86' | Stadium: Columbus Crew Stadium; Attendance: 3,000 |

| August 10 Friendly | Pittsburgh Riverhounds | 0-0 | Columbus Crew | Washington, PA |
| 7:05 PM EDT | Sent off (straight red) | Report | Sent off (straight red) | Stadium: Falconi Field; Attendance: 3,180 |

== Competitive ==
=== Overview ===
| Competition | First match | Last match | Starting round | Final position | Record | | | | | | | |
| Competition | First match | Last match | Starting round | Final position | Pld | W | D | L | GF | GA | GD | Win % |
|---|---|---|---|---|---|---|---|---|---|---|---|---|
| Major League Soccer | April 2, 2005 | October 15, 2005 | Matchday 1 | 10th | 32 | 11 | 5 | 16 | 34 | 45 | −11 | 34.38 |
| U.S. Open Cup | August 3, 2005 | August 3, 2005 | Fourth Round | Fourth Round | 1 | 0 | 0 | 1 | 1 | 3 | −2 | 0.00 |
| Total | | | | | 33 | 11 | 5 | 17 | 35 | 48 | −13 | 33.33 |

Source: Competitions

=== MLS ===
==== Standings ====
===== Eastern Conference =====
| Pos | Team | Pld | W | L | T | GF | GA | GD | Pts | Qualification |
|---|---|---|---|---|---|---|---|---|---|---|
| 2 | D.C. United | 32 | 16 | 10 | 6 | 58 | 37 | +21 | 54 | MLS Cup Playoffs |
| 3 | Chicago Fire | 32 | 15 | 13 | 4 | 49 | 50 | −1 | 49 | MLS Cup Playoffs |
| 4 | MetroStars | 32 | 12 | 9 | 11 | 53 | 49 | +4 | 47 | MLS Cup Playoffs |
| 5 | Kansas City Wizards | 32 | 11 | 9 | 12 | 52 | 44 | +8 | 45 | |
| 6 | Columbus Crew | 32 | 11 | 16 | 5 | 34 | 45 | −11 | 38 | |

Source: MLS

===== Overall table =====
| Pos | Team | Pld | W | L | T | GF | GA | GD | Pts | Qualification |
|---|---|---|---|---|---|---|---|---|---|---|
| 8 | Los Angeles Galaxy (C) | 32 | 13 | 13 | 6 | 44 | 45 | −1 | 45 | CONCACAF Champions' Cup |
| 9 | Kansas City Wizards | 32 | 11 | 9 | 12 | 52 | 44 | +8 | 45 | |
| 10 | Columbus Crew | 32 | 11 | 16 | 5 | 34 | 45 | −11 | 38 | |
| 11 | Real Salt Lake | 32 | 5 | 22 | 5 | 30 | 65 | −35 | 20 | |
| 12 | Chivas USA | 32 | 4 | 22 | 6 | 31 | 67 | −36 | 18 | |

Source: MLS
Rules for classification: 1) points; 2) head-to-head record; 3) goal difference; 4) number of goals scored
(C) Champions

==== Results summary ====
| Overall | | | | | | | | Home | | | | | | Away | | | | | |
| Pld | Pts | W | L | T | GF | GA | GD | W | L | T | GF | GA | GD | W | L | T | GF | GA | GD |
|---|---|---|---|---|---|---|---|---|---|---|---|---|---|---|---|---|---|---|---|
| 32 | 38 | 11 | 16 | 5 | 34 | 45 | −11 | 7 | 8 | 1 | 15 | 19 | −4 | 4 | 8 | 4 | 19 | 26 | −7 |

Source: MLS standings
Pld = Matches played; Pts = Points; W = Matches won; T = Matches tied; L = Matches lost; GF = Goals for; GA = Goals against; GD = Goal difference

==== Results by round ====
| Round | 1 | 2 | 3 | 4 | 5 | 6 | 7 | 8 | 9 | 10 | 11 | 12 | 13 | 14 | 15 | 16 | 17 | 18 | 19 | 20 | 21 | 22 | 23 | 24 | 25 | 26 | 27 | 28 | 29 | 30 | 31 | 32 |
|---|---|---|---|---|---|---|---|---|---|---|---|---|---|---|---|---|---|---|---|---|---|---|---|---|---|---|---|---|---|---|---|---|
| Stadium | H | A | H | A | H | A | H | H | A | H | H | A | H | A | H | H | A | H | H | A | A | H | A | A | A | H | H | A | H | A | A | A |
| Result | W | L | W | L | L | L | L | W | T | L | W | L | L | T | L | L | T | W | W | L | L | W | W | W | L | L | T | W | L | L | W | T |

Source: schedule
A = Away; H = Home; W = Win; L = Loss; T = Tie

==== Match results ====
| April 2 1 | Columbus Crew | 3-0 | Los Angeles Galaxy | Columbus, OH |
| 7:30 PM EST | Buddle 8', 47'; Fraser (yellow card) 43'; Razov 54' | Report | Umaña (yellow card) 26' | Stadium: Columbus Crew Stadium; Attendance: 14,358; Referee: Mark Geiger; Assistant referees: Rob Fereday; Richard Eddy; Fourth official: Terry Vaughn |

| April 9 2 | New England Revolution | 3-0 | Columbus Crew | Foxborough, MA |
| 7:30 PM EDT | Dempsey 64'; Riley (yellow card) 80'; Noonan 82'; Dorman 85' | Report | Elliott (yellow card) 45'; Szetela (yellow card) 57'; Lagos (yellow card) 62' | Stadium: Gillette Stadium; Attendance: 9,727; Referee: Terry Vaughn; Assistant referees: Richard Eddy; Steve Taylor; Fourth official: Gus St. Silva |

| April 15 3 | Columbus Crew | 1-0 | D.C. United | Columbus, OH |
| 8:00 PM EDT | Buddle 26'; Elliott (yellow card) 36'; Testo (yellow card) 41'; Hejduk (yellow card) 69' | Report | Gros (yellow card) 38'; Guppy (yellow card) 57'; Adu (yellow card) 69' | Stadium: Columbus Crew Stadium; Attendance: 12,449; Referee: Ricardo Salazar; Assistant referees: Thomas Supple; Adam Wienckowski; Fourth official: Hilario Grajeda |

| April 23 4 | Colorado Rapids | 2-0 | Columbus Crew | Denver, CO |
| 9:00 PM EDT | Mastroeni 2', (yellow card) 38'; Gonzalez 57' | Report | Rodríguez (red card) 75' | Stadium: Invesco Field at Mile High; Attendance: 10,165; Referee: Erich Simmons; Assistant referees: Fabio Tovar; Jose Corro; Fourth official: Andrew Chapin |

| April 30 5 | Columbus Crew | 0-2 | Chicago Fire | Columbus, OH |
| 7:30 PM EDT | Fraser (yellow card) 49'; Elliott (yellow card) 51' | Report | Mapp 14', (yellow card) 54'; Rolfe 69' | Stadium: Columbus Crew Stadium; Attendance: 11,111; Referee: Andrew Chapin; Assistant referees: Kermit Quisenberry; Jorge De La Bandera; Fourth official: Rizal Milliken |

| May 7 6 | D.C. United | 3-1 | Columbus Crew | Washington, D.C. |
| 7:30 PM EDT | Moreno 5'; Gros 9', (yellow card) 15'; Adu 71' | Report | Hejduk (yellow card) 24'; Glen (yellow card) 28'; Mediate 69' | Stadium: Robert F. Kennedy Memorial Stadium; Attendance: 14,894; Referee: Kevin Stott; Assistant referees: Nate Clement; Steve Taylor; Fourth official: Marcel Yonan |

| May 14 7 | Columbus Crew | 0-4 | Kansas City Wizards | Columbus, OH |
| 7:30 PM EDT | Martino (yellow card) 29'; Elliott (yellow card) 77' | Report | Zotincă 17'; Wolff 23', 87'; Arnaud 26'; Burciaga (yellow card) 67' | Stadium: Columbus Crew Stadium; Attendance: 9,260; Referee: Lee Suckle; Assistant referees: Thomas Supple; Bill Dittmar; Fourth official: Kevin Terry |

| May 21 8 | Columbus Crew | 2-0 | Real Salt Lake | Columbus, OH |
| 7:30 PM EDT | Hejduk 14', (yellow card) 27', (goal) 37'; Martino (yellow card) 34'; Glen (red card) 77' | Report | Akwari (yellow card) 61'; Williams (yellow card) 90' | Stadium: Columbus Crew Stadium; Attendance: 10,575; Referee: Kevin Stott; Assistant referees: George Gansner; Chip Reed; Fourth official: Jeffrey Mellen |

| May 25 9 | Los Angeles Galaxy | 0-0 | Columbus Crew | Carson, CA |
| 10:30 PM EDT | Albright (yellow card) 38' | Report | Fraser (yellow card) 10'; Hejduk (yellow card) 18'; Rodríguez (yellow card) 58' | Stadium: The Home Depot Center; Attendance: 18,066; Referee: Ramon Hernandez; Assistant referees: Emiliano Monje; Corey Rockwell; Fourth official: Colin Arblaster |

| May 28 10 | Columbus Crew | 0-3 | NY/NJ MetroStars | Columbus, OH |
| 7:30 PM EDT | Marshall (yellow card) 45' | Report | Djorkaeff 38'; Gaven 47'; Bradley (yellow card) 81'; Ibrahim (yellow card) 74', (goal) 89' | Stadium: Columbus Crew Stadium; Attendance: 9,413; Referee: Alex Prus; Assistant referees: Richard Eddy; Steve Taylor; Fourth official: Rizal Milliken |

| June 11 11 | Columbus Crew | 1-0 | Colorado Rapids | Columbus, OH |
| 4:00 PM EDT | Fraser (yellow card) 40'; Glen 67' (pen.) | Report | Mastroeni (yellow card) 21'; Borchers (yellow card) 31'; Beckerman (yellow card) 44' | Stadium: Columbus Crew Stadium; Attendance: 11,224; Referee: Baldomero Toledo; Assistant referees: Rob Fereday; Paul Scott; Fourth official: Hilario Grajeda |

| June 18 12 | NY/NJ MetroStars | 3-2 | Columbus Crew | East Rutherford, NJ |
| 7:30 PM EDT | Razov 31', 33'; Djorkaeff 70' (pen.) | Report | Buddle 36'; Glen 77' | Stadium: Giants Stadium; Attendance: 11,666; Referee: Michael Kennedy; Assistant referees: Jorge De La Bandera; C.J. Morgante; Fourth official: Roni Canales |

| June 22 13 | Columbus Crew | 1-3 | New England Revolution | Columbus, OH |
| 7:30 PM EDT | Buddle 4'; Wingert (yellow card) 9' | Report | Dempsey (yellow card) 9', (goal) 45+2'; Noonan 24', 68'; Heaps (yellow card) 27'; Leonard (yellow card) 56'; Smith (yellow card) 72' | Stadium: Columbus Crew Stadium; Attendance: 10,799; Referee: Kevin Terry; Assistant referees: Nate Clement; Adam Wienckowski; Fourth official: Brent Sorg |

| June 29 14 | Kansas City Wizards | 1-1 | Columbus Crew | Kansas City, MO |
| 8:00 PM EDT | Zavagnin (yellow card) 40'; Burciaga 76' | Report | Schulte (yellow card) 54'; Rodríguez 69' | Stadium: Arrowhead Stadium; Attendance: 5,519; Referee: Alex Prus; Assistant referees: Kermit Quisenberry; Richard Eddy; Fourth official: Brent Sorg |

| July 2 15 | Columbus Crew | 0-1 | D.C. United | Columbus, OH |
| 7:30 PM EDT | Martino (yellow card) 11' (yellow-red card) 75' | Report | Prideaux (yellow card) 14'; Kovalenko (yellow card) 16'; Marshall 64' (o.g.); Gómez (yellow card) 90' | Stadium: Columbus Crew Stadium; Attendance: 12,998; Referee: Jair Marrufo; Assistant referees: Nate Clement; Steve Taylor; Fourth official: Hilario Grajeda |

| July 9 16 | Columbus Crew | 1-2 | San Jose Earthquakes | Columbus, OH |
| 7:30 PM EDT | Marshall 18'; Wingert (yellow card) 36'; Fraser (yellow card) 42'; Schulte (yellow card) 76' | Report | Moreno (yellow card) 26'; Robinson 30'; Cerritos 63'; Clark (yellow card) 85' | Stadium: Columbus Crew Stadium; Attendance: 12,539; Referee: Andrew Chapin; Assistant referees: Rob Fereday; Jorge De La Bandera; Fourth official: Jeffrey Mellen |

| July 16 17 | Chicago Fire | 1-1 | Columbus Crew | Chicago, IL |
| 4:00 PM EDT | Mapp 62' | Report | Szetela (yellow card) 40'; Vasquez 54'; Henderson (yellow card) 75' | Stadium: Soldier Field; Attendance: 54,432; Referee: Richard Heron; Assistant referees: Fabio Tovar; Paul Scott; Fourth official: Jose Gesundheit |

| July 20 18 | Columbus Crew | 1-0 | NY/NJ MetroStars | Columbus, OH |
| 7:30 PM EDT | Testo (yellow card) 70'; Sutton 90+2' | Report | Bradley (yellow card) 22' | Stadium: Columbus Crew Stadium; Attendance: 10,990; Referee: Gus St. Silva; Assistant referees: Kermit Quisenberry; Steve Taylor; Fourth official: Hilario Grajeda |

| July 23 19 | Columbus Crew | 2-0 | Kansas City Wizards | Columbus, OH |
| 7:30 PM EDT | Cameron 45', 46'; Wingert (yellow card) 68' | Report | Thomas (yellow card) 40'; Garcia (yellow card) 73' | Stadium: Columbus Crew Stadium; Attendance: 14,579; Referee: Mark Geiger; Assistant referees: Thomas Supple; Richard Eddy; Fourth official: Jeffrey Mellen |

| August 6 20 | San Jose Earthquakes | 2-1 | Columbus Crew | San Jose, CA |
| 10:00 PM EDT | Chung (yellow card) 8'; De Rosario 13'; Califf (yellow card) 25'; Davis 54' | Report | Testo (yellow card) 14'; Martino (yellow card) 67'; Henderson 78'; Wingert (yellow card) 90' | Stadium: Spartan Stadium; Attendance: 9,465; Referee: Baldomero Toledo; Assistant referees: Emiliano Monje; Anthony Vasoli; Fourth official: Colin Arblaster |

| August 14 21 | NY/NJ MetroStars | 2-1 | Columbus Crew | East Rutherford, NJ |
| 6:00 PM EDT | Parke (yellow card) 40'; Rey 47'; Djorkaeff 66'; Leitch (yellow card) 73' | Report | Wolyniec 12'; Wingert (yellow card) 34' | Stadium: Giants Stadium; Attendance: 10,775; Referee: Jair Marrufo; Assistant referees: Craig Lowry; Richard Eddy; Fourth official: Jorge Gonzalez |

| August 20 22 | Columbus Crew | 1-0 | FC Dallas | Columbus, OH |
| 4:00 PM EDT | Glen 81', (yellow card) 81' | Report | Gbandi (yellow card) 65' | Stadium: Columbus Crew Stadium; Attendance: 15,525; Referee: Kevin Stott; Assistant referees: Nate Clement; Bill Dittmar; Fourth official: Mikael Lundqvist |

| August 26 23 | Kansas City Wizards | 0-1 | Columbus Crew | Kansas City, MO |
| 8:00 PM EDT | Zavagnin (yellow card) 54'; Gutiérrez (red card) 87' | Report | Martino (yellow card) 31'; Henderson 34', (yellow card) 86' | Stadium: Arrowhead Stadium; Attendance: 6,030; Referee: Ben Jones; Assistant referees: Kermit Quisenberry; Adam Wienckowski; Fourth official: Jose Andrade |

| September 3 24 | Chivas USA | 0-3 | Columbus Crew | Carson, CA |
| 10:00 PM EDT | Palencia (yellow card) 45' | Report | Glen 34'; Wolyniec 60', 69'; Szetela (yellow card) 76' | Stadium: The Home Depot Center; Attendance: 15,770; Referee: Mark Geiger; Assistant referees: Chip Reed; Frank Anderson; Fourth official: Ian Anderson |

| September 10 25 | New England Revolution | 3-1 | Columbus Crew | Foxborough, MA |
| 7:30 PM EDT | Joseph (yellow card) 9'; Twellman 6', 39', 63' | Report | Fraser (yellow card) 41'; Elliott (yellow card) 77'; Hejduk 86' | Stadium: Gillette Stadium; Attendance: 9,167; Referee: Abbey Okulaja; Assistant referees: Kermit Quisenberry; George Vergara; Fourth official: Niko Bratsis |

| September 17 26 | Columbus Crew | 1-2 | Chicago Fire | Columbus, OH |
| 7:30 PM EDT | Hejduk (yellow card) 63'; Cameron 80' | Report | Rolfe 5', 84'; Curtin (yellow card) 66'; Thiago (yellow card) 90' | Stadium: Columbus Crew Stadium; Attendance: 18,517; Referee: Erich Simmons; Assistant referees: Craig Lowry; Richard Eddy; Fourth official: Marcel Yonan |

| September 21 27 | Columbus Crew | 1-1 | New England Revolution | Columbus, OH |
| 7:30 PM EDT | Cameron 66'; Rodríguez (yellow card) 72' | Report | Twellman 90+3' | Stadium: Columbus Crew Stadium; Attendance: 11,769; Referee: Richard Heron; Assistant referees: Rob Fereday; C.J. Morgante; Fourth official: Terry Vaughn |

| September 24 28 | Real Salt Lake | 1-2 | Columbus Crew | Salt Lake City, UT |
| 9:30 PM EDT | Williams 86', (yellow card) 90'; Cabrera (yellow card) 90' | Report | Martino (yellow card) 44'; Buddle 8', 45+2'; Wingert (yellow card) 65'; Glen (yellow card) 78'; Fraser (yellow card) 82' | Stadium: Rice-Eccles Stadium; Attendance: 14,352; Referee: Andrew Chapin; Assistant referees: Jose Corro; Emiliano Monje; Fourth official: Feliciano Palomino |

| October 1 29 | Columbus Crew | 0-1 | Chivas USA | Columbus, OH |
| 7:30 PM EDT | Wingert (yellow card) 86' | Report | Palencia 59', (yellow card) 88' | Stadium: Columbus Crew Stadium; Attendance: 20,548; Referee: Alex Prus; Assistant referees: Nate Clement; Bill Dittmar; Fourth official: Jeffrey Mellen |

| October 5 30 | FC Dallas | 2-1 | Columbus Crew | Frisco, TX |
| 8:30 PM EDT | Gbandi (yellow card) 33'; Rhine 58'; O'Brien (yellow card) 62'; Núñez 90+2' | Report | Testo 17'; Glen (yellow card) 63' | Stadium: Pizza Hut Park; Attendance: 6,961; Referee: Gus St. Silva; Assistant referees: George Vergara; Paul Scott; Fourth official: Kevin Terry |

| October 8 31 | Chicago Fire | 1-2 | Columbus Crew | Chicago, IL |
| 8:30 PM EDT | Marsch 51' | Report | Elliott 55' (pen.); Vasquez 76'; Testo (yellow card) 81'; Glen (yellow card) 90' | Stadium: Soldier Field; Attendance: 21,097; Referee: Ricardo Salazar; Assistant referees: Kermit Quisenberry; Jorge De La Bandera; Fourth official: Marcel Yonan |

| October 15 32 | D.C. United | 2-2 | Columbus Crew | Washington, D.C. |
| 7:30 PM EDT | Kovalenko 45', (yellow card) 57'; Moreno 75' (pen.); Olsen (yellow card) 88' | Report | Buddle 17', 52'; Schulte (yellow card) 25'; Wingert (yellow card) 62'; Sutton (yellow card) 80' | Stadium: Robert F. Kennedy Memorial Stadium; Attendance: 22,463; Referee: Terry Vaughn; Assistant referees: Rob Fereday; Bill Dittmar; Fourth official: Mark Geiger |

=== MLS Cup Playoffs ===
The Columbus Crew failed to qualify for the playoffs in this season.

=== U.S. Open Cup ===
| August 3 Fourth Round | Columbus Crew (MLS) (Ohio) | 1-3 (a.e.t.) | (Texas) FC Dallas (MLS) | Columbus, OH |
| | Rhine (yellow card) 20'; Talley 29', (yellow card) 89'; Moor (yellow card) 36'; Pitchkolan (yellow card) 56'; Thompson 113'; Johnson (yellow card) 105+1', (goal) 116' | Report | Martino 36'; Vasquez (yellow card) 41'; Szetela (red card) 100'; Hejduk (red card) 103' | Stadium: Jesse Owens Memorial Stadium; Referee: Ricardo Salazar; Assistant referees: Steven Taylor; Richard Eddy; Fourth official: Hilario Grajeda |

== Reserve League ==
=== Overall table ===
| Pos | Club | Pld | W | L | T | GF | GA | GD | Pts |
|---|---|---|---|---|---|---|---|---|---|
| 1 | D.C. United Reserves (C) | 12 | 8 | 4 | 0 | 26 | 21 | +5 | 24 |
| 2 | MetroStars Reserves | 12 | 5 | 3 | 4 | 16 | 12 | +4 | 19 |
| 2 | New England Revolution Reserves | 12 | 5 | 3 | 4 | 20 | 18 | +2 | 19 |
| 2 | FC Dallas Reserves | 12 | 6 | 5 | 1 | 24 | 24 | 0 | 19 |
| 5 | Colorado Rapids Reserves | 12 | 5 | 4 | 3 | 29 | 22 | +7 | 18 |
| 5 | Chicago Fire Reserves | 12 | 5 | 4 | 3 | 24 | 20 | +4 | 18 |
| 5 | San Jose Earthquakes Reserves | 12 | 5 | 4 | 3 | 23 | 20 | +3 | 18 |
| 5 | Kansas City Wizards Reserves | 12 | 5 | 4 | 3 | 19 | 17 | +2 | 18 |
| 9 | Los Angeles Galaxy Reserves | 12 | 4 | 5 | 3 | 20 | 28 | −8 | 15 |
| 10 | Real Salt Lake Reserves | 12 | 4 | 6 | 2 | 29 | 34 | −5 | 14 |
| 11 | Columbus Crew Reserves | 12 | 4 | 7 | 1 | 19 | 25 | −6 | 13 |
| 12 | Chivas USA Reserves | 12 | 2 | 9 | 1 | 15 | 23 | −8 | 7 |

=== Match results ===
| April 24 1 | Colorado Rapids | 0-1 | Columbus Crew | Westminster, CO |
| 12:00 PM EDT | | Report | Lagos (yellow card) 11'; Tamporello (yellow card) 26'; Sutton 50' | Stadium: Rapids Training Facility |

| May 1 2 | Columbus Crew | 3-3 | Chicago Fire | Obetz, OH |
| 10:00 AM EDT | Storey 18'; Glen 25'; Kelly 51'; Vasquez (yellow card) 72' | Report | Johnson 53'; Niebles 90+1'; Gray 90+3' | Stadium: Crew Training Center; Attendance: 125 |

| May 22 3 | Columbus Crew | 5-2 | Real Salt Lake | Obetz, OH |
| 10:00 AM EDT | Gallardo 9'; Sutton 21', 59', 67'; Szetela (yellow card) 79'; Rutledge 90+1' | Report | O'Brien 54', (yellow card) 56'; Washington 89' | Stadium: Crew Training Center; Attendance: 125 |

| May 29 4 | Columbus Crew | 1-0 | NY/NJ MetroStars | Obetz, OH |
| 10:00 AM EDT | Sutton 59'; Kelly (yellow card) 59'; Mediate (yellow card) 66' | Report | Pedeiras (yellow card) 41' | Stadium: Crew Training Center; Attendance: 125 |

| June 11 5 | Columbus Crew | 1-2 | Colorado Rapids | Columbus, OH |
| 6:30 PM EDT | Storey 85'; Vasquez (yellow card) 90+3' | Report | Melamed 72'; Gonzalez 77' | Stadium: Columbus Crew Stadium; Attendance: 150 |

| June 19 6 | NY/NJ MetroStars | 1-0 | Columbus Crew | Queens, NY |
| 10:00 AM EDT | Rey 78' | Report | Herdsman (yellow card) 58'; Storey (yellow card) 69'; Schulte (red card) 85'; Kelly (yellow card) 90+1' | Stadium: Belson Stadium |

| July 3 7 | Columbus Crew | 1-4 | D.C. United | Obetz, OH |
| 10:00 AM EDT | Gaudette (yellow card) 9'; Vasquez (yellow card) 53'; Sutton 57' | Report | Sahaydak (yellow card) 6'; Merritt (yellow card) 15'; Adu 18'; Nickell 28', 46'; Quill 46' | Stadium: Crew Training Center; Attendance: 150 |

| September 11 8 | New England Revolution | 3-2 | Columbus Crew | Wrentham, MA |
| 10:00 AM EDT | John (yellow card) 17'; Cancela 23' (pen.); Edozien 25', (yellow card) 39'; Larentowicz (yellow card) 82'; Wilson 67' | Report | Cameron 3'; Mediate (red card) 22'; Barclay 45' | Stadium: Wrentham State School; Referee: Niko Bratsis |

| September 25 9 | Real Salt Lake | 5-2 | Columbus Crew | Park City, UT |
| 12:00 PM EDT | Knowles 5'; Acosta 24'; Washington 58', 81'; Kreamalmeyer 61' | Report | Storey 27', 45' | Stadium: Trailside Park |

| October 2 10 | Columbus Crew | 0-2 | Chivas USA | Obetz, OH |
| 10:00 AM EDT | López 52'; Martínez 56'; Blanco (yellow card) 63' (yellow-red card) 70' | Report | Glen (red card) 19'; Vasquez (yellow card) 70' | Stadium: Crew Training Center; Attendance: 100 |

| October 9 11 | Chicago Fire | 1-2 | Columbus Crew | Lake Forest, IL |
| 11:00 AM EDT | Wolyniec 23', 32'; Smith (yellow card) 85' | Report | Rosenband 9'; Johnson (yellow card) 41' | Stadium: Lake Forest Academy; Attendance: 30; Referee: Jose Gesundheit |

| October 16 12 | D.C. United | 2-1 | Columbus Crew | Washington, D.C. |
| 10:00 AM EDT | Walker 8'; Thompson 60' | Report | Cameron 70' | Stadium: Robert F. Kennedy Memorial Stadium |

== Statistics ==
=== Appearances and goals ===
Under "Apps" for each section, the first number represents the number of starts, and the second number represents appearances as a substitute.

| No. | Pos | Nat | Player | Total | | MLS | | U.S. Open Cup | |
| No. | Pos | Nat | Player | Apps | Goals | Apps | Goals | Apps | Goals |
|---|---|---|---|---|---|---|---|---|---|
| 1 | GK | (United States) USA | Jon Busch | 9 | 0 | 9+0 | 0 | 0+0 | 0 |
| 2 | DF | (United States) USA | Frankie Hejduk | 19 | 3 | 15+3 | 3 | 1+0 | 0 |
| 4 | DF | (United States) USA | Robin Fraser | 30 | 0 | 29+0 | 0 | 1+0 | 0 |
| 5 | DF | (United States) USA | Stephen Herdsman | 7 | 0 | 7+0 | 0 | 0+0 | 0 |
| 6 | DF | (United States) USA | Chris Wingert | 33 | 1 | 32+0 | 1 | 1+0 | 0 |
| 7 | DF | (New Zealand) NZL | Simon Elliott | 1 | 0 | 0+0 | 0 | 1+0 | 0 |
| 8 | DF | (New Zealand) NZL | Duncan Oughton | 0 | 0 | 0+0 | 0 | 0+0 | 0 |
| 9 | FW | (Guatemala) GUA | Mario Rodríguez | 20 | 1 | 15+4 | 1 | 0+1 | 0 |
| 10 | MF | (United States) USA | Kyle Martino | 28 | 1 | 27+0 | 0 | 1+0 | 1 |
| 11 | FW | (United States) USA | John Wolyniec | 17 | 3 | 8+9 | 3 | 0+0 | 0 |
| 12 | FW | (United States) USA | Edson Buddle | 23 | 9 | 21+2 | 9 | 0+0 | 0 |
| 13 | DF | (United States) USA | Mark Schulte | 19 | 0 | 18+1 | 0 | 0+0 | 0 |
| 14 | DF | (United States) USA | Chad Marshall | 31 | 1 | 30+0 | 1 | 1+0 | 0 |
| 15 | FW | (United States) USA | Devin Barclay | 1 | 0 | 0+1 | 0 | 0+0 | 0 |
| 16 | MF | (United States) USA | Ross Paule | 0 | 0 | 0+0 | 0 | 0+0 | 0 |
| 17 | MF | (United States) USA | Danny Szetela | 1 | 0 | 0+0 | 0 | 0+1 | 0 |
| 18 | MF | (United States) USA | Marcus Storey | 0 | 0 | 0+0 | 0 | 0+0 | 0 |
| 19 | MF | (United States) USA | Chris Henderson | 22 | 2 | 21+0 | 2 | 1+0 | 0 |
| 21 | FW | (Panama) PAN | Luis Gallardo | 0 | 0 | 0+0 | 0 | 0+0 | 0 |
| 22 | GK | (United States) USA | Matt Jordan | 2 | 0 | 2+0 | 0 | 0+0 | 0 |
| 23 | FW | (United States) USA | David Testo | 17 | 1 | 12+5 | 1 | 0+0 | 0 |
| 26 | FW | (Trinidad and Tobago) TRI | Cornell Glen | 23 | 4 | 13+9 | 4 | 1+0 | 0 |
| 27 | FW | (United States) USA | Jamal Sutton | 9 | 1 | 3+5 | 1 | 0+1 | 0 |
| 28 | MF | (United States) USA | Domenic Mediate | 11 | 1 | 4+7 | 1 | 0+0 | 0 |
| 29 | FW | (United States) USA | Knox Cameron | 21 | 4 | 9+11 | 4 | 1+0 | 0 |
| 30 | MF | (United States) USA | Eric Vasquez | 12 | 2 | 8+3 | 2 | 1+0 | 0 |
| 31 | GK | (Puerto Rico) PUR | Bill Gaudette | 6 | 0 | 5+1 | 0 | 0+0 | 0 |
| 33 | DF | (United States) USA | Ryan Kelly | 7 | 0 | 3+4 | 0 | 0+0 | 0 |
| 34 | FW | (South Africa) RSA | Stephen Armstrong | 7 | 0 | 2+5 | 0 | 0+0 | 0 |
| 88 | GK | (United States) USA | Jonny Walker | 17 | 0 | 16+0 | 0 | 1+0 | 0 |
| | | | Own goal | 0 | 0 | - | 0 | - | 0 |
Players who left Columbus during the season:
| 9 | FW | (United States) USA | Ante Razov | 7 | 1 | 5+2 | 1 | 0+0 | 0 |
| 11 | MF | (United States) USA | Manny Lagos | 5 | 0 | 2+3 | 0 | 0+0 | 0 |
| 30 | GK | (United States) USA | Clint Baumstark | 0 | 0 | 0+0 | 0 | 0+0 | 0 |
| 30 | GK | (United States) USA | Andrew Terris | 0 | 0 | 0+0 | 0 | 0+0 | 0 |
| 50 | GK | (United States) USA | Michael Cardenas | 0 | 0 | 0+0 | 0 | 0+0 | 0 |
| 99 | FW | (United States) USA | Dante Washington | 0 | 0 | 0+0 | 0 | 0+0 | 0 |

=== Disciplinary record ===
| No. | Pos. | Name | MLS | | U.S. Open Cup | | Total | |
| No. | Pos. | Name | Booked | Sent off (straight red) | Booked | Sent off (straight red) | Booked | Sent off (straight red) |
|---|---|---|---|---|---|---|---|---|
| 1 | GK | (United States) Jon Busch | 0 | 0 | 0 | 0 | 0 | 0 |
| 2 | DF | (United States) Frankie Hejduk | 5 | 0 | 0 | 1 | 5 | 1 |
| 4 | DF | (United States) Robin Fraser | 7 | 0 | 0 | 0 | 7 | 0 |
| 5 | DF | (United States) Stephen Herdsman | 0 | 0 | 0 | 0 | 0 | 0 |
| 6 | DF | (United States) Chris Wingert | 0 | 0 | 0 | 0 | 0 | 0 |
| 7 | DF | (New Zealand) Simon Elliott | 5 | 0 | 0 | 0 | 5 | 0 |
| 8 | DF | (New Zealand) Duncan Oughton | 0 | 0 | 0 | 0 | 0 | 0 |
| 9 | FW | (Guatemala) Mario Rodríguez | 2 | 1 | 0 | 0 | 2 | 1 |
| 10 | MF | (United States) Kyle Martino | 6 | 1 | 0 | 0 | 6 | 1 |
| 11 | FW | (United States) John Wolyniec | 0 | 0 | 0 | 0 | 0 | 0 |
| 12 | FW | (United States) Edson Buddle | 0 | 0 | 0 | 0 | 0 | 0 |
| 13 | DF | (United States) Mark Schulte | 3 | 0 | 0 | 0 | 3 | 0 |
| 14 | DF | (United States) Chad Marshall | 1 | 0 | 0 | 0 | 1 | 0 |
| 15 | FW | (United States) Devin Barclay | 0 | 0 | 0 | 0 | 0 | 0 |
| 16 | MF | (United States) Ross Paule | 0 | 0 | 0 | 0 | 0 | 0 |
| 17 | MF | (United States) Danny Szetela | 0 | 0 | 0 | 1 | 0 | 1 |
| 18 | MF | (United States) Marcus Storey | 0 | 0 | 0 | 0 | 0 | 0 |
| 19 | MF | (United States) Chris Henderson | 2 | 0 | 0 | 0 | 2 | 0 |
| 21 | FW | (Panama) Luis Gallardo | 0 | 0 | 0 | 0 | 0 | 0 |
| 22 | GK | (United States) Matt Jordan | 0 | 0 | 0 | 0 | 0 | 0 |
| 23 | FW | (United States) David Testo | 4 | 0 | 0 | 0 | 4 | 0 |
| 26 | FW | (Trinidad and Tobago) Cornell Glen | 5 | 1 | 0 | 0 | 5 | 1 |
| 27 | FW | (United States) Jamal Sutton | 1 | 0 | 0 | 0 | 1 | 0 |
| 28 | MF | (United States) Domenic Mediate | 0 | 0 | 0 | 0 | 0 | 0 |
| 29 | FW | (United States) Knox Cameron | 0 | 0 | 0 | 0 | 0 | 0 |
| 30 | MF | (United States) Eric Vasquez | 0 | 0 | 1 | 0 | 1 | 0 |
| 31 | GK | (Puerto Rico) Bill Gaudette | 0 | 0 | 0 | 0 | 0 | 0 |
| 33 | DF | (United States) Ryan Kelly | 0 | 0 | 0 | 0 | 0 | 0 |
| 34 | FW | (South Africa) Stephen Armstrong | 0 | 0 | 0 | 0 | 0 | 0 |
| 88 | GK | (United States) Jonny Walker | 0 | 0 | 0 | 0 | 0 | 0 |
Players who left Columbus during the season:
| 9 | FW | (United States) Ante Razov | 0 | 0 | 0 | 0 | 0 | 0 |
| 11 | MF | (United States) Manny Lagos | 1 | 0 | 0 | 0 | 1 | 0 |
| 30 | GK | (United States) Clint Baumstark | 0 | 0 | 0 | 0 | 0 | 0 |
| 30 | GK | (United States) Andrew Terris | 0 | 0 | 0 | 0 | 0 | 0 |
| 30 | GK | (United States) Michael Cardenas | 0 | 0 | 0 | 0 | 0 | 0 |
| 99 | FW | (United States) Dante Washington | 0 | 0 | 0 | 0 | 0 | 0 |

=== Clean sheets ===
| No. | Name | MLS | U.S. Open Cup | Total | Games Played |
|---|---|---|---|---|---|
| 1 | (United States) Jon Busch | 3 | 0 | 3 | 9 |
| 22 | (United States) Matt Jordan | 0 | 0 | 0 | 2 |
| 31 | (Puerto Rico) Bill Gaudette | 1 | 0 | 1 | 6 |
| 88 | (United States) Jonny Walker | 5 | 0 | 5 | 17 |
Players who left Columbus during the season:
| 30 | (United States) Clint Baumstark | 0 | 0 | 0 | 0 |
| 30 | (United States) Andrew Terris | 0 | 0 | 0 | 0 |
| 50 | (United States) Michael Cardenas | 0 | 0 | 0 | 0 |

== Reserve League Statistics ==
=== Appearances and goals ===
Under "Apps" for each section, the first number represents the number of starts, and the second number represents appearances as a substitute.

| No. | Pos | Nat | Player | Total | | MLS Reserve League | |
| No. | Pos | Nat | Player | Apps | Goals | Apps | Goals |
|---|---|---|---|---|---|---|---|
| 34 | FW | (South Africa) RSA | Stephen Armstrong | 5 | 0 | 5+0 | 0 |
| 15 | FW | (United States) USA | Devin Barclay | 6 | 1 | 6+0 | 1 |
| - | GK | (United States) USA | Clint Baumstark | 1 | 0 | 1+0 | 0 |
| - | FW | (United States) USA | Matt Broadhead | 1 | 0 | 0+1 | 0 |
| - | DF | (United States) USA | Chris Brunt | 1 | 0 | 1+0 | 0 |
| 12 | FW | (United States) USA | Edson Buddle | 2 | 0 | 2+0 | 0 |
| - | MF | (United States) USA | Paul Cabrera | 1 | 0 | 1+0 | 0 |
| 29 | FW | (United States) USA | Knox Cameron | 9 | 2 | 8+1 | 2 |
| - | GK | (United States) USA | Mike Cardenas | 1 | 0 | 0+1 | 0 |
| 21 | MF | (Panama) PAN | Luis Gallardo | 6 | 1 | 4+2 | 1 |
| 31 | GK | (Puerto Rico) PUR | Bill Gaudette | 7 | 0 | 4+3 | 0 |
| 26 | FW | (Trinidad and Tobago) TRI | Cornell Glen | 4 | 1 | 4+0 | 1 |
| 5 | DF | (United States) USA | Stephen Herdsman | 3 | 0 | 2+1 | 0 |
| - | MF | (United States) USA | Zane Hill | 1 | 0 | 0+1 | 0 |
| 34 | DF | (United States) USA | Bret Jones | 3 | 0 | 1+2 | 0 |
| 22 | GK | (United States) USA | Matt Jordan | 4 | 0 | 4+0 | 0 |
| - | MF | (United States) USA | Freddy Juarez | 1 | 0 | 1+0 | 0 |
| 33 | DF | (United States) USA | Ryan Kelly | 6 | 1 | 5+1 | 1 |
| 11 | MF | (United States) USA | Manny Lagos | 1 | 0 | 1+0 | 0 |
| - | MF | (United States) USA | Jeff Matteo | 3 | 0 | 3+0 | 0 |
| 28 | MF | (United States) USA | Domenic Mediate | 10 | 0 | 9+1 | 0 |
| - | MF | (United States) USA | Brian O'Rourke | 4 | 0 | 0+4 | 0 |
| 25 | MF | (United States) USA | Jeremy Parkins | 7 | 0 | 2+5 | 0 |
| 3 | MF | (United States) USA | John Racette | 1 | 0 | 0+1 | 0 |
| 6 | FW | (Guatemala) GUA | Mario Rodríguez | 3 | 0 | 2+1 | 0 |
| 35 | FW | (United States) USA | Andrew Rutledge | 6 | 1 | 1+5 | 1 |
| 13 | DF | (United States) USA | Mark Schulte | 6 | 0 | 6+0 | 0 |
| 99 | DF | (United States) USA | Derek Smith | 2 | 0 | 2+0 | 0 |
| 18 | MF | (United States) USA | Marcus Storey | 10 | 4 | 10+0 | 4 |
| 34 | MF | (United States) USA | Ricky Strong | 2 | 0 | 0+2 | 0 |
| 27 | FW | (United States) USA | Jamal Sutton | 10 | 6 | 10+0 | 6 |
| 17 | MF | (United States) USA | Danny Szetela | 2 | 0 | 2+0 | 0 |
| 38 | MF | (United States) USA | Glen Sullivan | 2 | 0 | 2+0 | 0 |
| 26 | FW | (United States) USA | Sammy Tamporello | 2 | 0 | 1+1 | 0 |
| 50 | GK | (United States) USA | Andrew Terris | 2 | 0 | 2+0 | 0 |
| 23 | FW | (United States) USA | David Testo | 5 | 0 | 5+0 | 0 |
| 25 | DF | (United States) USA | Jake Traeger | 1 | 0 | 0+1 | 0 |
| 30 | MF | (United States) USA | Eric Vasquez | 9 | 0 | 8+1 | 0 |
| - | GK | (United States) USA | Jonny Walker | 0 | 0 | 0+0 | 0 |
| 3 | DF | (United States) USA | Chris Wingert | 4 | 0 | 3+1 | 0 |
| - | MF | (United States) USA | Peter Withers | 3 | 0 | 1+2 | 0 |
| 11 | FW | (United States) USA | John Wolyniec | 5 | 2 | 5+0 | 2 |
| | | | Own goal | 0 | 0 | - | 0 |

=== Disciplinary record ===
| No. | Pos. | Name | MLS Reserve League | | Total | |
| No. | Pos. | Name | Booked | Sent off (straight red) | Booked | Sent off (straight red) |
|---|---|---|---|---|---|---|
| 34 | FW | (South Africa) Stephen Armstrong | 0 | 0 | 0 | 0 |
| 15 | FW | (United States) Devin Barclay | 0 | 0 | 0 | 0 |
| - | GK | (United States) Clint Baumstark | 0 | 0 | 0 | 0 |
| - | FW | (United States) Matt Broadhead | 0 | 0 | 0 | 0 |
| - | DF | (United States) Chris Brunt | 0 | 0 | 0 | 0 |
| 12 | FW | (United States) Edson Buddle | 0 | 0 | 0 | 0 |
| - | MF | (United States) Paul Cabrera | 0 | 0 | 0 | 0 |
| 29 | FW | (United States) Knox Cameron | 0 | 0 | 0 | 0 |
| - | GK | (United States) Mike Cardenas | 0 | 0 | 0 | 0 |
| 21 | FW | (Panama) Luis Gallardo | 0 | 0 | 0 | 0 |
| 31 | GK | (Puerto Rico) Bill Gaudette | 1 | 0 | 1 | 0 |
| 26 | FW | (Trinidad and Tobago) Cornell Glen | 0 | 1 | 0 | 1 |
| 5 | DF | (United States) Stephen Herdsman | 1 | 0 | 1 | 0 |
| - | MF | (United States) Zane Hill | 0 | 0 | 0 | 0 |
| 34 | DF | (United States) Bret Jones | 0 | 0 | 0 | 0 |
| 22 | GK | (United States) Matt Jordan | 0 | 0 | 0 | 0 |
| - | MF | (United States) Freddy Juarez | 0 | 0 | 0 | 0 |
| 33 | DF | (United States) Ryan Kelly | 2 | 0 | 2 | 0 |
| 11 | MF | (United States) Manny Lagos | 1 | 0 | 1 | 0 |
| - | MF | (United States) Jeff Matteo | 0 | 0 | 0 | 0 |
| 28 | MF | (United States) Domenic Mediate | 1 | 1 | 1 | 1 |
| - | MF | (United States) Brian O'Rourke | 0 | 0 | 0 | 0 |
| 25 | MF | (United States) Jeremy Parkins | 0 | 0 | 0 | 0 |
| 3 | MF | (United States) John Racette | 0 | 0 | 0 | 0 |
| 6 | FW | (Guatemala) Mario Rodríguez | 0 | 0 | 0 | 0 |
| 35 | FW | (United States) Andrew Rutledge | 0 | 0 | 0 | 0 |
| 13 | DF | (United States) Mark Schulte | 0 | 1 | 0 | 1 |
| 99 | DF | (United States) Derek Smith | 1 | 0 | 1 | 0 |
| 18 | MF | (United States) Marcus Storey | 1 | 0 | 1 | 0 |
| 34 | MF | (United States) Ricky Strong | 0 | 0 | 0 | 0 |
| 27 | FW | (United States) Jamal Sutton | 0 | 0 | 0 | 0 |
| 17 | MF | (United States) Danny Szetela | 1 | 0 | 1 | 0 |
| 38 | MF | (United States) Glen Sullivan | 0 | 0 | 0 | 0 |
| 26 | FW | (United States) Sammy Tamporello | 1 | 0 | 1 | 0 |
| 34 | FW | (United States) Stephen Armstrong | 0 | 0 | 0 | 0 |
| 50 | GK | (United States) Andrew Terris | 0 | 0 | 0 | 0 |
| 23 | FW | (United States) David Testo | 0 | 0 | 0 | 0 |
| 25 | DF | (United States) Jake Traeger | 0 | 0 | 0 | 0 |
| 30 | MF | (United States) Eric Vasquez | 4 | 0 | 4 | 0 |
| - | GK | (United States) Jonny Walker | 0 | 0 | 0 | 0 |
| 3 | DF | (United States) Chris Wingert | 1 | 0 | 1 | 0 |
| - | MF | (United States) Peter Withers | 0 | 0 | 0 | 0 |
| 11 | FW | (United States) John Wolyniec | 1 | 0 | 1 | 0 |

=== Clean sheets ===
| No. | Name | MLS Reserve League | Total | Games Played |
|---|---|---|---|---|
| - | (United States) Clint Baumstark | 1 | 1 | 1 |
| - | (United States) Michael Cardenas | 0 | 0 | 1 |
| 31 | (Puerto Rico) Bill Gaudette | 0.5 | 0.5 | 7 |
| 1 | (United States) Matt Jordan | 0.5 | 0.5 | 4 |
| 50 | (United States) Andrew Terris | 0 | 0 | 2 |
| 88 | (United States) Jonny Walker | 0 | 0 | 0 |

== Transfers ==
=== In ===
| Pos. | Player | Transferred from | Fee/notes | Date | Source |
|---|---|---|---|---|---|
| FW | (United States) Ante Razov | (United States) Chicago Fire | Traded for Tony Sanneh | January 30, 2005 | |
| FW | (Guatemala) Mario Rodríguez | (Guatemala) C.S.D. Municipal | | March 22, 2005 | |
| MF | (United States) Marcus Storey | (United States) North Carolina Tar Heels | Drafted in round 2 of the 2005 MLS SuperDraft. Signed a developmental contract. | April 2, 2005 | |
| MF | (United States) Domenic Mediate | (United States) Maryland Terrapins | Drafted in round 2 of the 2005 MLS SuperDraft. Signed a developmental contract. | April 2, 2005 | |
| FW | (United States) Knox Cameron | (United States) Michigan Wolverines | Drafted in round 4 of the 2005 MLS SuperDraft. Signed a developmental contract. | April 2, 2005 | |
| GK | (Puerto Rico) Bill Gaudette | (United States) St. John's Red Storm | Drafted in round 1 of the 2005 MLS Supplemental Draft. Signed a developmental contract. | April 2, 2005 | |
| MF | (United States) Eric Vasquez | (United States) Central Florida Kraze | Drafted in round 2 of the 2005 MLS Supplemental Draft. Signed a developmental contract. | April 2, 2005 | |
| DF | (United States) Ryan Kelly | (United States) St. John's Red Storm | Drafted in round 3 of the 2005 MLS Supplemental Draft. Signed a developmental contract. | April 2, 2005 | |
| DF | (United States) Mark Schulte | (Iceland) ÍBV | | April 2, 2005 | |
| FW | (Trinidad and Tobago) Cornell Glen | (United States) FC Dallas | Traded for a second round draft pick in the 2006 MLS SuperDraft and a Youth International slot | April 26, 2005 | |
| FW | (Panama) Luis Gallardo | (Panama) A.D. Municipal Pérez Zeledón | Signed a developmental contract | April 28, 2005 | |
| MF | (United States) Chris Henderson | (United States) Colorado Rapids | Part of a three way trade where D.C. United received a partial allocation and Colorado Rapids received Mike Petke | May 25, 2005 | |
| FW | (United States) John Wolyniec | (United States) NY/NJ MetroStars | Traded with a portion of an allocation and Ante Razov | June 7, 2005 | |
| FW | (South Africa) Stephen Armstrong | (United States) Michigan Bucks | | June 18, 2005 | |
| GK | (United States) Jonny Walker | (United States) NY/NJ MetroStars | Traded for a fourth round draft pick in the 2006 MLS Supplemental Draft | July 1, 2005 | |
| DF | (United States) Ritchie Kotschau | (United States) Colorado Rapids | Traded for Cornell Glen | November 29, 2005 | |

=== Loan in ===
| Pos. | Player | Parent club | Length/Notes | Beginning | End | Source |
|---|---|---|---|---|---|---|
| GK | (United States) Clint Baumstark | (United States) MLS Pool | Short term agreement | May 28, 2005 | May 29, 2005 | |
| GK | (United States) Andrew Terris | (United States) MLS Pool | Short term agreement | June 11, 2005 | June 22, 2005 | |
| GK | (United States) Michael Cardenas | (United States) MLS Pool | Short term agreement | June 29, 2005 | July 3, 2005 | |

=== Out ===
| Pos. | Player | Transferred to | Fee/notes | Date | Source |
|---|---|---|---|---|---|
| FW | (United States) Jeff Cunningham | (United States) Colorado Rapids | Traded for a first round draft pick in the 2006 MLS SuperDraft | January 14, 2005 | |
| DF | (United States) Tony Sanneh | (United States) Chicago Fire | Traded for Ante Razov | January 30, 2005 | |
| MF | (United States) Brian Maisonneuve | Retired | | January 31, 2005 | |
| DF | (United States) Eric Denton | (United States) Colorado Rapids | Placed on waivers | February 9, 2005 | |
| FW | (United States) Dante Washington | (United States) Real Salt Lake | Placed on waivers. Rights traded for an undisclosed amount for salary budget considerations on May 20, 2005. | April 26, 2005 | |
| MF | (United States) Manny Lagos | Retired | Placed on waivers | May 25, 2005 | |
| FW | (United States) Ante Razov | (United States) NY/NJ MetroStars | Traded for John Wolyniec and a portion of an allocation | June 7, 2005 | |
| DF | (United States) Robin Fraser | Retired | | November 9, 2005 | |
| FW | (United States) Devin Barclay | Retired | Placed on waivers | November 15, 2005 | |
| DF | (United States) Ryan Kelly | Retired | Placed on waivers | November 15, 2005 | |
| DF | (United States) Mark Schulte | (Uruguay) Montevideo Wanderers F.C. | Placed on waivers | November 15, 2005 | |
| FW | (South Africa) Stephen Armstrong | (United States) Charleston Battery | Placed on waivers | November 15, 2005 | |
| FW | (Trinidad and Tobago) Cornell Glen | (United States) Colorado Rapids | Traded for Ritchie Kotschau | November 29, 2005 | |
| MF | (United States) Ross Paule | Retired | Contract expired | December 31, 2005 | |
| FW | (Guatemala) Mario Rodríguez | (United States) Miami FC | Contract expired | December 31, 2005 | |

=== MLS Draft picks ===
Draft picks are not automatically signed to the team roster. Only those who are signed to a contract will be listed as transfers in. The picks for the Columbus Crew are listed below:

2005 Columbus Crew SuperDraft Picks
| Round | Pick | Player | Position | College |
| 2 | 20 | (United States) Marcus Storey | MF | North Carolina |
| 2 | 23 | (United States) Domenic Mediate | MF | Maryland |
| 4 | 44 | (United States) Knox Cameron | FW | Michigan |

2005 Columbus Crew Supplemental Draft Picks
| Round | Pick | Player | Position | College |
| 1 | 8 | (United States) Matt Oliver | DF | Virginia Cavaliers |
| 1 | 9 | (Puerto Rico) Bill Gaudette | GK | St. John's Red Storm |
| 2 | 20 | (United States) Eric Vasquez | MF | UC Santa Barbara |
| 3 | 32 | (United States) Ryan Kelly | DF | St. John's Red Storm |
| 4 | 44 | (United States) Chris Lee | FW | Marquette Golden Eagles |

== Awards ==
=== MLS Player of the Week ===
| Week | Player | Opponent(s) | Link |
|---|---|---|---|
| 1 | (United States) Edson Buddle | Los Angeles Galaxy | |
| 3 | (United States) Jon Busch | D.C. United | |

=== 2005 MLS All-Star Game ===
Starters

- DF Frankie Hejduk

=== Postseason ===
MLS Operations Executive of the Year

- Scott DeBolt

=== Crew Team Awards ===
- Most Valuable Player – Simon Elliot
- Defensive Player of the Year – Jonny Walker
- Scoring Champion – Edson Buddle
- Man of the Year – Robin Fraser
- Coach's Award – Chris Henderson
- Newcomer of the Year – Jonny Walker
- Goal of the Year – Eric Vasquez & Jamal Sutton
- Humanitarian of the Year – Jon Busch
- Hardest Working Man of the Year – Chris Henderson
- Comeback Player of the Year – Jonny Walker
- Fan of the Year – Jane Scott
