= All-time Columbus Crew roster =

This list comprises all players who have participated in at least one league match for the Columbus Crew since the team's first Major League Soccer season in 1996. Players who were on the roster but never appeared in a game are not listed; players who appeared for the team in other competitions (US Open Cup, CONCACAF Champions League, etc.) but never actually made an MLS appearance are noted at the bottom of the page.

A "†" denotes players who only appeared in a single match.

As of June 27, 2026

== A ==
- (United States) Saad Abdul-Salaam
- (Ghana) Mohammed Abu
- (Ghana) Lalas Abubakar
- (United States) Ubusuku Abukusumo
- (Ghana) David Accam
- (United States) Chase Adams
- (Trinidad and Tobago) Kevin Adams
- (Nigeria) Fanendo Adi
- (Ghana) Harrison Afful
- (Azerbaijan) Nariman Akhundzade
- (United States) Nelson Akwari
- (United States) Fatai Alashe
- (Palestine) Wessam Abou Ali
- (Nigeria) Ibrahim Aliyu
- (Denmark) Malte Amundsen
- (United States) Jalil Anibaba
- (Venezuela) Bernardo Añor
- (United States) Maximilian Arfsten
- (United States) Luis Argudo
- (Costa Rica) Jairo Arrieta
- (United States) Steve Armas
- (South Africa) Stephen Armstrong
- (United States) Corey Ashe
- (Brazil) Artur

== B ==
- (Ghana) Fifi Baiden †
- (United States) Rich Balchan
- (Guinea) Sekou Bangoura
- (United States) Devin Barclay
- (Argentina) Guillermo Barros Schelotto
- (United States) Chad Barson
- (United States) Shane Battelle
- (United States) Adam Bedell
- (United States) Joe Bendik
- (United States) Sebastian Berhalter
- (Spain) Miguel Berry
- (Trinidad and Tobago) Chris Birchall
- (Croatia) Leonard Bisaku
- (United States) Brian Bliss
- (Ghana) Emmanuel Boateng
- (Uganda) Tenywa Bonseu
- (United States) Tristan Brown
- (United States) Eric Brunner
- (United States) Edson Buddle
- (United States) Marc Burch
- (United States) Kevin Burns
- (United States) Jon Busch
- (United States) Evan Bush
- (Jamaica) Altimont Butler †

== C ==
- (Scotland) Chris Cadden
- (United States) Paul Caligiuri
- (France) Rudy Camacho
- (United States) Knox Cameron
- (Jamaica) Sergio Campbell †
- (United States) Scott Cannon
- (Argentina) Marcelo Carrera
- (United States) Brian Carroll
- (United States) Conor Casey
- (France) Dylan Chambost
- (Ukraine) Yevhen Cheberko
- (United States) Matt Chulis
- (United States) Mike Clark
- (United States) Ricardo Clark
- (United States) Steve Clark
- (United States) Ryan Coiner
- (United States) Mac Cozier
- (United States) Alex Crognale
- (United States) Jeff Cunningham

== D ==
- (United States) John DeBrito
- (Australia) Miloš Degenek
- (United States) Eric Denton
- (Costa Rica) Luis Díaz
- (United States) Thomas Dooley
- (United States) Mark Dougherty
- (United States) Mike Duhaney
- (United States) Dilly Duka
- (United States) Brian Dunseth

== E ==
- (Nigeria) Emmanuel Ekpo
- (Trinidad and Tobago) Ancil Elcock
- (United States) Cory Elenio
- (New Zealand) Simon Elliott
- (Haiti) Derrick Etienne Jr.
- (United States) Brad Evans

== F ==
- (United States) Jason Farrell
- (Algeria) Mohamed Farsi
- (United States) Ethan Finlay
- (United States) Ryan Finley
- (Jamaica) Shaun Francis
- (Costa Rica) Waylon Francis
- (Canada) Liam Fraser
- (United States) Robin Fraser
- (United States) Brad Friedel
- (United States) Ross Friedman

== G ==
- (United States) Romain Gall
- (Guatemala) Freddy García
- (United States) Josh Gardner
- (United States) Jason Garey
- (Puerto Rico) Bill Gaudette
- (United States) Eddie Gaven
- (Hungary) Dániel Gazdag
- (United States) Eric Gehrig
- (Trinidad and Tobago) Kevan George
- (Argentina) Lautaro Giaccone
- (United States) Steve Gillespie
- (Brazil) Gláuber
- (Trinidad and Tobago) Cornell Glen
- (United States) Jimmy Glenn
- (Portugal) André Gomes
- (Costa Rica) Giancarlo González
- (Chile) Marcos González
- (Argentina) Mario Gori
- (United States) Ned Grabavoy
- (Argentina) Hernán Grana
- (United States) Ricci Greenwood †
- (United States) Andrew Gregor
- (United States) Mike Grella
- (United States) Alex Grendi
- (United States) Julian Gressel
- (France) Léandre Griffit
- (United States) Cole Grossman
- (United States) Andy Gruenebaum
- (Costa Rica) David Guzmán

== H ==
- (United States) Taha Habroune
- (Guatemala) Nicholas Hagen
- (United States) Marlon Hairston
- (Canada) Jordan Hamilton
- (Denmark) Niko Hansen
- (United States) John Harkes
- (Canada) Pat Harrington
- (United States) Tom Heinemann
- (United States) Frankie Hejduk
- (United States) Chris Henderson
- (Saint Vincent and the Grenadines) Ezra Hendrickson
- (United States) Stephen Herdsman
- (Colombia) Cucho Hernández
- (Argentina) Nicolás Hernández
- (Argentina) Andrés Herrera
- (Colombia) Sergio Herrera †
- (Costa Rica) Andy Herron
- (United States) William Hesmer
- (Argentina) Federico Higuaín
- (Colombia) Marino Hinestroza
- (United States) Aaron Horton †
- (United States) Keegan Hughes †
- (United States) Erik Hurtado

== I ==
- (Nigeria) James Igbekeme
- (Argentina) Ricardo Iribarren
- (England) Andy Iro

== J ==
- (United States) Rob Jachym
- (United States) Aziel Jackson
- (United States) Adam Jahn
- (Trinidad and Tobago) Julius James
- (United States) Hector Jiménez
- (Trinidad and Tobago) Stern John
- (United States) DeJuan Jones
- (United States) Derrick Jones
- (United States) Matt Jordan
- (United States) Miles Joseph
- (United States) Ryan Junge

== K ==
- (Sierra Leone) Kei Kamara
- (Norway) Ola Kamara
- (United States) Tarun Karumanchi
- (Guinea) Aboubacar Keita
- (United States) Ryan Kelly
- (United States) Jon Kempin
- (South Africa) Doctor Khumalo
- (England) Joel Kitamirike †
- (United States) Perry Kitchen
- (United States) Chris Klute
- (United States) Matt Kmosko
- (United States) Ritchie Kotschau

== L ==
- (United States) Manny Lagos
- (United States) Matt Lampson
- (Finland) Lassi Lappalainen
- (United States) Mike Lapper
- (Denmark) Emil Larsen
- (United States) Chris Leitch
- (United States) Steven Lenhart
- (United States) Brooks Lennon
- (United States) Mario Longo

== M ==
- (Democratic Republic of the Congo) Cedrick Mabwati
- (United States) Brian Maisonneuve
- (United States) Connor Maloney
- (The Gambia) Kekuta Manneh
- (United States) Pete Marino
- (United States) Chad Marshall
- (Panama) Cristian Martínez
- (United States) Kyle Martino
- (Romania) Alexandru Mățan
- (United States) Jeff Matteo
- (United States) Brian McBride
- (United States) Chad McCarty
- (United States) Jack McInerney
- (United States) Domenic Mediate
- (Colombia) Jimmy Medranda
- (United States) Carlos Mendes
- (Spain) Brais Méndez †
- (Peru) Andrés Mendoza
- (Ghana) Jonathan Mensah
- (Iraq) Justin Meram
- (United States) Janusz Michallik
- (Brazil) Stefani Miglioranzi
- (Argentina) Sergio Miguez
- (United States) Todd Miller
- (Chile) Sebastián Miranda
- (Chile) Milovan Mirošević
- (Scotland) Adam Moffat
- (Morocco) Youness Mokhtar
- (Trinidad and Tobago) Kevin Molino
- (United States) Obi Moneme †
- (Cape Verde) Steven Moreira
- (Venezuela) Alejandro Moreno
- (United States) Aidan Morris
- (United States) Brandon Moss
- (Philippines) Cole Mrowka
- (United States) Patrick Mullins

== N ==
- (Norway) Nicolai Næss
- (United States) Darlington Nagbe
- (United States) Matt Napoleon
- (Hungary) Krisztián Németh
- (Zimbabwe) Joseph Ngwenya
- (United States) Pat Noonan

== O ==
- (Ghana) Dominic Oduro
- (Ghana) Edward Opoku
- (United States) Danny O'Rourke
- (United States) Bo Oshoniyi
- (New Zealand) Duncan Oughton

== P ==
- (Argentina) Gino Padula
- (United States) Daniel Paladini
- (United States) Noah Palmer
- (United States) Isaiah Parente
- (United States) Michael Parkhurst
- (United States) Ross Paule
- (Uruguay) Adrián Paz
- (United States) Trevor Perea †
- (United States) Andrew Peterson
- (France) Hugo Picard
- (United States) Rusty Pierce
- (Honduras) Alex Pineda Chacón
- (Austria) Emanuel Pogatetz
- (United States) Dan Popik †
- (United States) Owen Presthus †
- (United States) Tom Presthus

== Q ==
- (United States) Philip Quinton

== R ==
- (Finland) Jukka Raitala
- (United States) Christian Ramirez
- (United States) Ante Razov
- (Venezuela) Emilio Rentería
- (Mexico) José Retiz
- (Spain) Álvaro Rey
- (United States) Michael Ritch
- (Brazil) Robinho
- (Guatemala) Mario Rodríguez
- (United States) Robbie Rogers
- (Mexico) Abraham Romero
- (Curaçao) Eloy Room
- (Uruguay) Diego Rossi
- (Chile) Sebastián Rozental
- (Argentina) Silvio Rudman
- (Serbia) Dejan Rusmir
- (Canada) Jacen Russell-Rowe
- (United States) Cesar Ruvalcaba
- (Poland) Miroslaw Rzepa

== S ==
- (Eritrea) Mohammed Saeid
- (United States) Jorge Salcedo
- (Argentina) Matías Sánchez
- (United States) Will Sands
- (United States) Tony Sanneh
- (Portugal) Pedro Santos
- (Guatemala) Rodrigo Saravia
- (Argentina) Gastón Sauro
- (United States) Dominic Schell
- (United States) Aaron Schoenfeld
- (United States) Kenny Schoeni †
- (United States) Mark Schulte
- (United States) Patrick Schulte
- (Costa Rica) Erick Scott
- (United States) Amar Sejdić
- (United States) Rob Smith
- (United States) Juergen Sommer
- (Venezuela) Eduardo Sosa
- (United States) Ben Speas
- (United States) Zack Steffen
- (Iceland) Kristinn Steindórsson
- (United States) Marcus Storey
- (United States) Brad Stuver
- (United States) Jamal Sutton
- (United States) Ben Swanson †
- (United States) Danny Szetela

== T ==
- (United States) Andrew Tarbell
- (Egypt) Amro Tarek †
- (Cameroon) Tony Tchani
- (United States) David Testo
- (Senegal) Jamal Thiaré
- (United States) Jacob Thomas
- (United States) Billy Thompson
- (Costa Rica) Daniel Torres
- (United States) Jake Traeger
- (United States) Wil Trapp

== U ==
- (United States) Kirk Urso

== V ==
- (Argentina) Milton Valenzuela
- (Ecuador) Gustavo Vallecilla
- (Costa Rica) Olman Vargas
- (Bolivia) Roland Vargas-Aguilera
- (United States) Eric Vasquez
- (Uruguay) Agustín Viana
- (Brazil) Ricardo Virtuoso
- (Montenegro) Nemanja Vuković

== W ==
- (United States) Tyson Wahl
- (United States) Jonny Walker
- (Brazil) Diego Walsh
- (United States) Brandon Ward
- (United States) Tim Ward
- (Poland) Konrad Warzycha
- (Poland) Robert Warzycha
- (United States) Dante Washington
- (Canada) Mark Watson
- (United States) Brian West
- (Jamaica) Andy Williams
- (United States) JJ Williams
- (United States) Josh Williams
- (Northern Ireland) Mark Williams
- (Jamaica) Romario Williams
- (Colombia) John Wilmar Pérez
- (United States) Chris Wingert
- (United States) David Winner
- (England) Ian Woan
- (United States) John Wolyniec
- (United States) A. J. Wood
- (Netherlands) Vito Wormgoor
- (England) Bradley Wright-Phillips

== Y ==
- (United States) Todd Yeagley
- (Ghana) Yaw Yeboah
- (Jamaica) Paul Young

== Z ==
- (United States) Gyasi Zardes
- (United States) Sean Zawadzki
- (United States) Jed Zayner
- (Armenia) Lucas Zelarayán

== By Nationality ==
Nation	Number of players
United States	182
Argentina	15
Ghana	10
Costa Rica	9
Trinidad and Tobago	8
Brazil	6
Jamaica	6
Canada	5
Colombia	5
Chile	4
England	4
France	4
Guatemala	4
Nigeria	4
Venezuela	4
Denmark	3
Poland	3
Spain	3
Uruguay	3
Finland	2
Guinea	2
Hungary	2
Mexico	2
New Zealand	2
Norway	2
Portugal	2
Scotland	2
South Africa	2
Algeria	1
Armenia	1
Australia	1
Austria	1
Azerbaijan	1
Bolivia	1
Cabo Verde	1
Cameroon	1
Croatia	1
Curaçao	1
DR Congo	1
Ecuador	1
Egypt	1
Eritrea	1
Gambia	1
Haiti	1
Honduras	1
Iceland	1
Iraq	1
Montenegro	1
Morocco	1
Netherlands	1
Northern Ireland	1
Panama	1
Palestine	1
Peru	1
Philippines	1
Puerto Rico	1
Romania	1
Saint Vincent and the Grenadines	1
Sierra Leone	1
Senegal	1
Serbia	1
Ukraine	1
Uganda	1
Zimbabwe	1

== Miscellaneous ==
Players that never played in a league match, but appeared in another competition:

- (Mexico) Ivan Becerra: one U.S. Open Cup appearance.
- (United States) Ray Burse: two CONCACAF Champions League appearances.
- (United States) Noah Fuson: one U.S. Open Cup appearance.
- (Ivory Coast) Kevin Gbamblé: one U.S. Open Cup appearance, one Leagues Cup appearance.
- (United States) Marshall Hollingsworth: one U.S. Open Cup appearance.
- (United States) George Josten: one U.S. Open Cup appearance.
- (United States) Logan Ketterer: one U.S. Open Cup appearance.
- (United States) Grant Lillard: one CONCACAF Champions League appearance.
- (United States) Jake Morris: three U.S. Open Cup appearances.
- (Ecuador) Mike Mucino: two CONCACAF Giants Cup appearances.
- (Zimbabwe) Stanley Nyazamba: one U.S. Open Cup appearance.
- (United States) Aubrey Perry: one U.S. Open Cup appearance.
- (Argentina) Santiago Prim: one U.S. Open Cup appearance.
- (United States) Gibran Rayo: one U.S. Open Cup appearance.
- (United States) Thomas Roberts: two U.S. Open Cup appearances.
- (United States) Ben Sweat: one U.S. Open Cup appearance.
- (United States) Korey Veeder: one U.S. Open Cup appearance.

== Sources ==
- "MLS All-Time MLS Player Register". Mlsnet.com. Major League Soccer. Archived from the original on 14 February 2009.
- "MLS Number Assignments Archive".
