= 2003 MLS supplemental draft =

College draft for soccer teams

Before the 2003 season, Major League Soccer held supplemental drafts, in which players who had signed with the league after the 2003 MLS SuperDraft were made available for selection.

*	Denotes player who has been selected for an MLS Best XI team

== February 28, 2003 Supplemental Draft ==
Pick #	Drafting Team	Player	Pos	Former Team
1	San Jose Earthquakes (Note: #1: D.C. United → San Jose Earthquakes. 11 February 2003: San Jose Earthquakes acquired the #1 selection in the February 28, 2003 Supplemental Draft and a fourth-round pick (#48), originally a conditional selection, in the 2005 MLS SuperDraft from D.C. United in exchange for the #6 selection in the February 28, 2003 Supplemental Draft and forward Devin Barclay.)	Brian Ching	F	Seattle Sounders (USL)
2	MetroStars	PASS		
3	Kansas City Wizards	PASS		
4	Chicago Fire	PASS		
5	Dallas Burn	PASS		
6	D.C. United (Note: #6: San Jose Earthquakes → D.C. United. 11 February 2003: D.C. United acquired the #6 selection in the February 28, 2003 Supplemental Draft and forward Devin Barclay from San Jose Earthquakes in exchange for the #1 selection in the February 28, 2003 Supplemental Draft and a fourth-round pick (#48), originally a conditional selection, in the 2005 MLS SuperDraft.)	PASS		
7	Columbus Crew	Ian Joy	D	Kidderminster Harriers F.C.
8	Colorado Rapids	Scott Vallow	GK	Dallas Burn
9	New England Revolution	PASS		
10	Los Angeles Galaxy	PASS		

== April 10, 2003 Supplemental Draft ==
Pick #	Drafting Team	Player	Position	Former Team
?	MetroStars	John Wolyniec	F	Milwaukee Rampage
?	Dallas Burn	Philip Salyer	D	SV Werder Bremen (Reserves)
