= 2005 MLS SuperDraft =

College draft for soccer teams

General information
- Sport: Soccer
- Date: January 14, 2005
- Time: 12:00 p.m. (ET)
- Location: Baltimore, Maryland
- Network: Fox Sports World

Overview
- 48 total selections
- First selection: Nikolas Besagno, Real Salt Lake
- Most selections: Chicago Fire; San Jose Earthquakes (7 selections)
- Fewest selections: D.C. United; MetroStars (2 selections)

The 2005 MLS SuperDraft, held in Baltimore, Maryland, on January 14, 2005, was the sixth incarnation of the annual MLS SuperDraft. Expansion club Real Salt Lake had the first pick as the result of a coin toss (fellow newcomers C.D. Chivas USA got to go first in the expansion draft). RSL drafted Under-17 midfielder Nikolas Besagno with the first selection.

A collective bargaining agreement with the MLS Players' Union dictated that the draft be reduced from six to four rounds, although a supplemental draft was held to equip newly formed reserve teams and compensate for expansion.

== Player selection ==
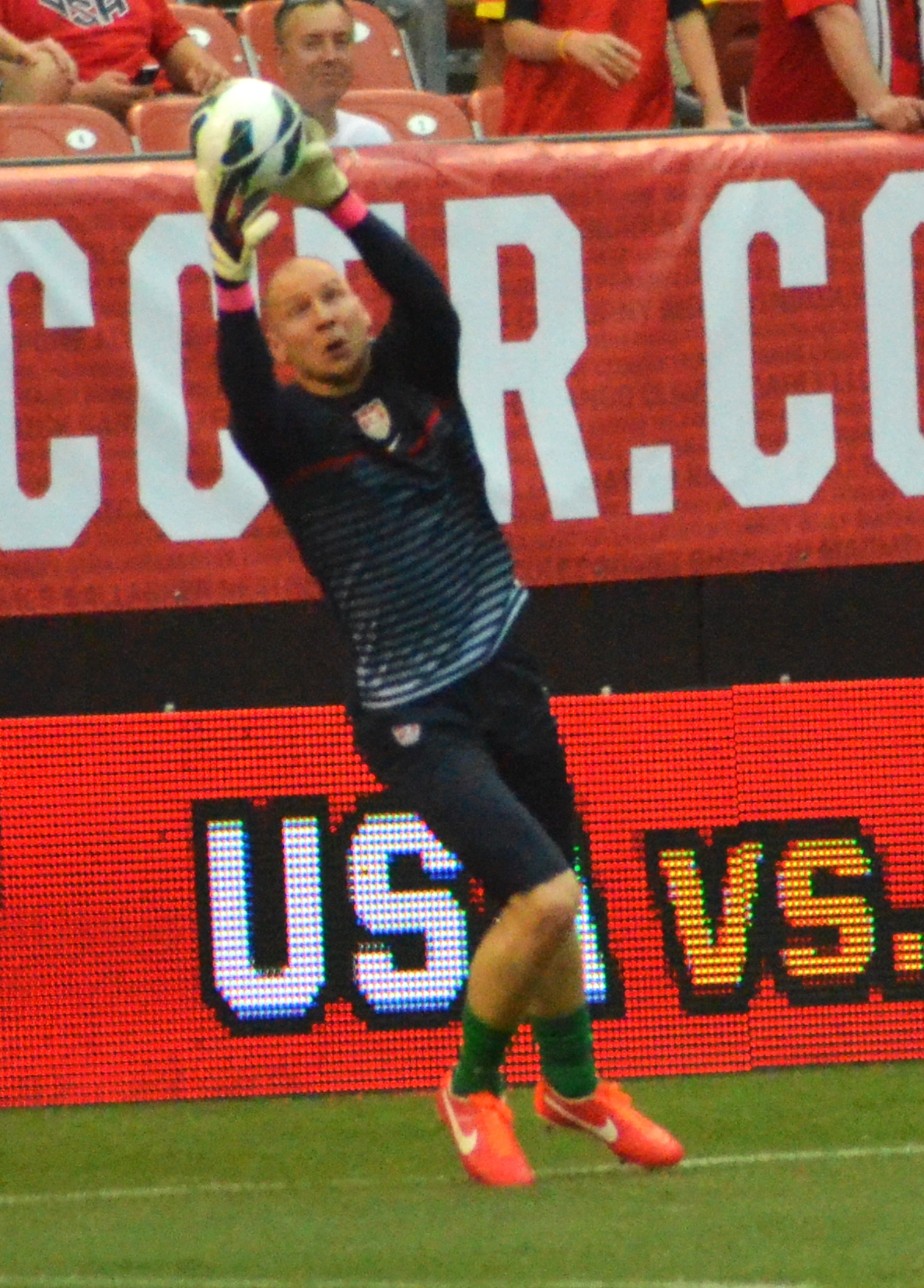
Chivas USA selected Brad Guzan 2nd overall. The 2007 MLS Goalkeeper of the Year is a 2x MLS All-Star and named to the 2007 MLS Best XI. He earned 64 caps with the US Men's National Team and was selected to the 2010 and 2014 FIFA World Cup squads.

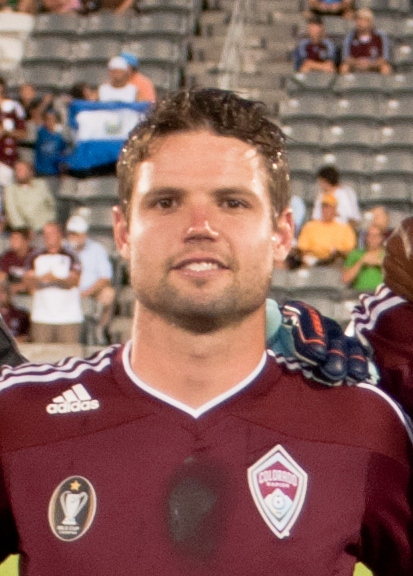
FC Dallas selected Drew Moor 6th overall. The 2015 MLS All-Star is a member of 400 games played club and holds the record for the most consecutive games played by a field player at 68 matches.

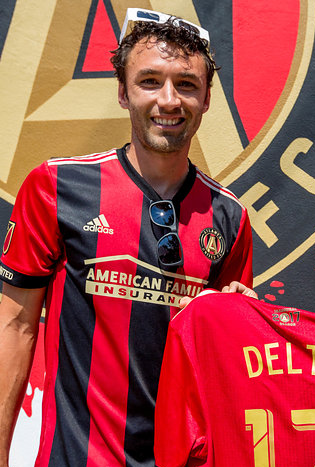
New England selected Michael Parkhurst 9th overall. The 2005 MLS Rookie of the Year is a 6x All-Star and in 2007 won the MLS Defender of the Year and was named to the MLS Best XI.

Key

*	Denotes a player contracted under the Generation Adidas program
^	Denotes player who has been selected to an MLS All-Star Game
§	Denotes a player who won the MLS Rookie of the Year
†	Denotes player who has been selected for an MLS Best XI team
~	Denotes a player who won the MLS MVP

=== Round one ===
Pick #	MLS Team	Player	Pos	Affiliation
1	Real Salt Lake	(United States) Nikolas Besagno*	M	Generation Adidas
2	Chivas USA	(United States) Brad Guzan*^†	GK	University of South Carolina
3	Chicago Fire	(United States) Chad Barrett*	F	UCLA
4	San Jose Earthquakes (Note: #4: FC Dallas → San Jose Earthquakes. January 14, 2005: San Jose acquired this pick, midfielder Brad Davis, and an allocation from FC Dallas in exchange for the #6 pick, the #29 pick, midfielder Richard Mulrooney, and midfielder Arturo Alvarez.)	(United States) Danny O'Rourke	M	Indiana University
5	Los Angeles Galaxy (Note: #5: San Jose Earthquakes → Los Angeles Galaxy. January 12, 2005: Los Angeles acquired this pick, defender Todd Dunivant, and goalkeeper Steve Cronin from San Jose in exchange for the #6 pick, forward Alejandro Moreno, and defender Chris Aloisi.)	(United States) Ugo Ihemelu	D	SMU
6	F.C. Dallas (Note: #6: MetroStars → Los Angeles Galaxy → San Jose Earthquakes → FC Dallas. January 14, 2005: FC Dallas acquired this pick, the #29 pick, midfielder Richard Mulrooney, and midfielder Arturo Alvarez from San Jose in exchange for the #4 pick, midfielder Brad Davis, and an allocation. San Jose had acquired this pick, forward Alejandro Moreno, and defender Chris Aloisi from Los Angeles in exchange for pick #5, defender Todd Dunivant, and goalkeeper Steve Cronin on January 12, 2005. Los Angeles had acquired this pick and future considerations from MetroStars in exchange for a second-round selection in the 2004 MLS SuperDraft on January 14, 2004.)	(United States) Drew Moor*^	D	Indiana University
7	Colorado Rapids	(United States) Hunter Freeman*	D	University of Virginia
8	Los Angeles Galaxy (Note: #8: Columbus Crew → Los Angeles Galaxy. January 12, 2004: Los Angeles acquired this pick from Columbus in exchange for midfielder Simon Elliott.)	(United States) Troy Roberts	D	University of California
9	New England Revolution	(United States) Michael Parkhurst*^§†	D	Wake Forest University
10	Chicago Fire (Note: #10: Los Angeles Galaxy → Chicago Fire. January 16, 2004: Chicago acquired this pick from Los Angeles in exchange for the #14 pick in the 2004 MLS SuperDraft.)	(United States) Jack Stewart	D	University of Notre Dame
11	Kansas City Wizards	(Trinidad and Tobago) Scott Sealy	F	Wake Forest University
12	MetroStars (Note: #12: D.C. United → MetroStars → FC Dallas → MetroStars. January 14, 2005: MetroStars re-acquired this pick from FC Dallas in exchange for forward Cornell Glen. FC Dallas had acquired this pick (originally future considerations) from MetroStars in exchange for midfielder Joselito Vaca on February 5, 2004. The future considerations were to be either MetroStars' 2006 natural first- and second-round selections or a 2005 first-round selection should MetroStars acquire a first-round pick prior to the draft. (Note: "Rapids Prepare for Friday's MLS SuperDraft; Rules and Selection Order Revealed". MLSSoccer.com. March 25, 2010. "Re-posted date") Earlier in the day, MetroStars had acquired this pick and pick #25 from D.C. United as final compensation for the March 2, 2004 trade which sent Jaime Moreno from MetroStars to D.C. United.)	(United States) Tim Ward*	D	Saint Louis University

=== Round two ===
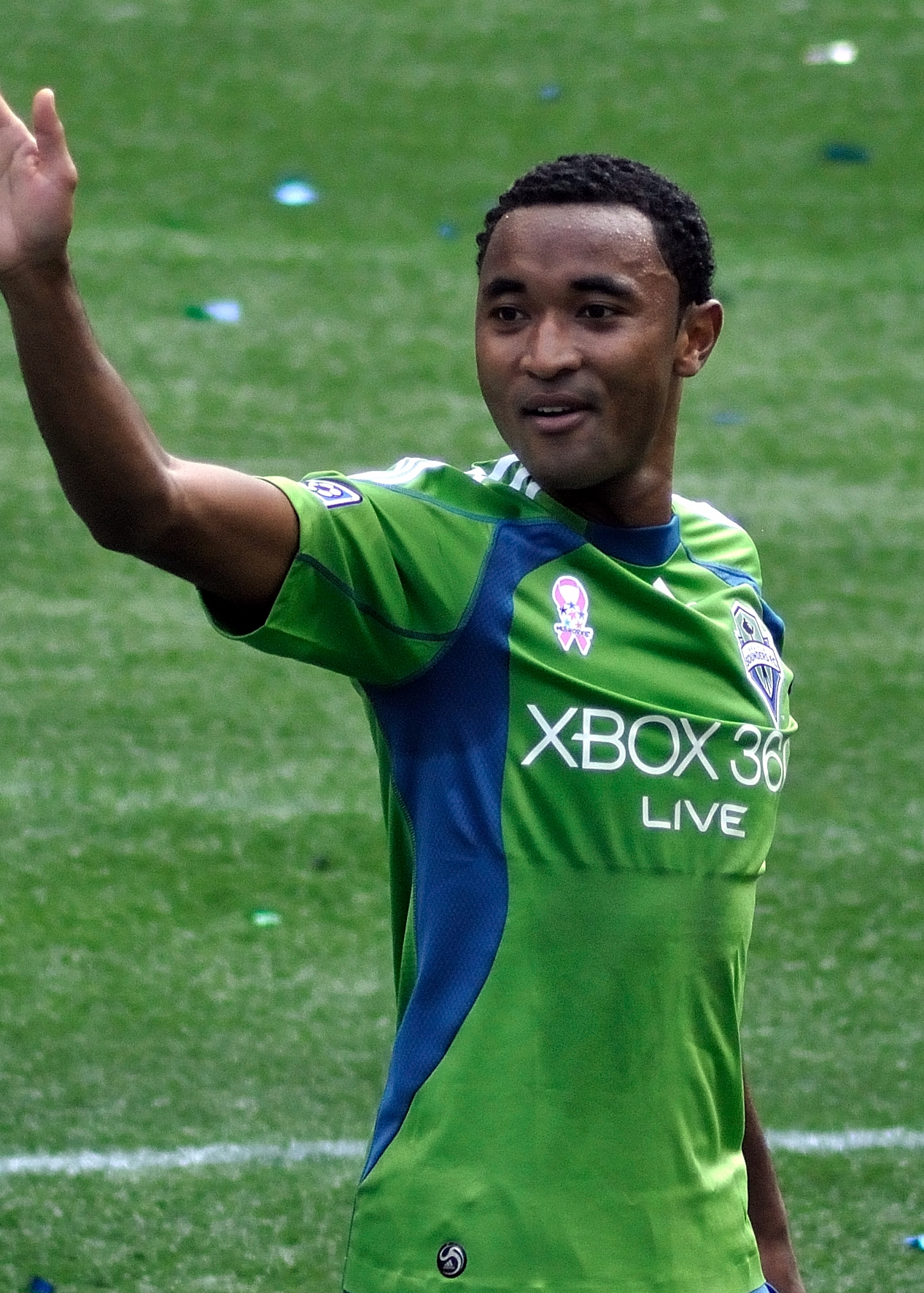
New England selected James Riley 21st overall. He would go on to play in 249 Major League Soccer games.

Pick #	MLS Team	Player	Position	Affiliation
13	Real Salt Lake	(United States) Jamie Watson*	F	University of North Carolina
14	C.D. Chivas USA	(United States) Christian Jimenez*	M	University of South Florida
15	Los Angeles Galaxy (Note: #15: Chicago Fire → FC Dallas → Kansas City Wizards → Los Angeles Galaxy. January 14, 2005: Los Angeles acquired this pick from Kansas City in exchange for midfielder Sasha Victorine. Kansas City had acquired this pick (originally a conditional selection), the #4 selection in the 2004 MLS SuperDraft, and defender Shavar Thomas from FC Dallas in exchange for defender Carey Talley, midfielder Eric Quill, and the #7 selection in the 2004 MLS SuperDraft on January 16, 2004. FC Dallas had acquired this pick (originally a conditional selection) from Chicago in exchange for goalkeeper DJ Countess February 20, 2004.)	(United States) Michael Enfield	M	UCLA
16	Kansas City Wizards (Note: #16: FC Dallas → Colorado Rapids → Kansas City Wizards. January 13, 2005: Kansas City acquired this pick from Colorado in exchange for pick #33 and pick #36. Colorado had acquired this pick from FC Dallas in exchange for goalkeeper Scott Garlick on December 17, 2003.)	(United States) Ryan Pore*	F	University of Tulsa
17	San Jose Earthquakes	(United States) Kevin Goldthwaite	D	University of Notre Dame
18	Chicago Fire (Note: #18: MetroStars → Chicago Fire. January 16, 2004: Chicago acquired this pick from MetroStars in exchange for a second-round selection in the 2004 MLS SuperDraft.)	(United States) Will John*	M	Saint Louis University
19	D.C. United (Note: #19: Colorado Rapids → D.C. United. June 29, 2004: D.C. United acquired this pick from Colorado in exchange for the rights to discovery player Alberto Delgado.)	(United States) Nick Van Sicklen	M	University of Wisconsin–Madison
20	Columbus Crew (Note: #20: Columbus Crew → Colorado Rapids → Columbus Crew. January 16, 2004: Columbus re-acquired this pick from Colorado in exchange for a third-round selection in the 2004 MLS SuperDraft and the rights to defender Stephen Herdsman. Colorado had acquired this pick (originally a conditional pick) and pick #16 in the 2004 MLS SuperDraft from Columbus in exchange for defender Robin Fraser on January 14, 2004.)	(United States) Marcus Storey	M	University of North Carolina
21	New England Revolution	(United States) James Riley	D	Wake Forest University
22	Real Salt Lake (Note: #22: Los Angeles Galaxy → Real Salt Lake. January 14, 2005: Real Salt Lake acquired this pick from Los Angeles in exchange for an allocation.)	(United States) Jay Nolly	GK	Indiana University
23	Columbus Crew (Note: #23: Kansas City Wizards → Columbus Crew. January 15, 2004: Columbus acquired this pick from Kansas City in exchange for midfielder Diego Walsh.)	(United States) Domenic Mediate	M	University of Maryland
24	Kansas City Wizards (Note: #24: D.C. United → Kansas City Wizards. January 16, 2004: Kansas City acquired this pick and pick #36 from D.C. United in exchange for a second-round selection in the 2004 MLS SuperDraft.)	(United States) Christopher Sawyer	GK	University of Notre Dame

=== Round three ===
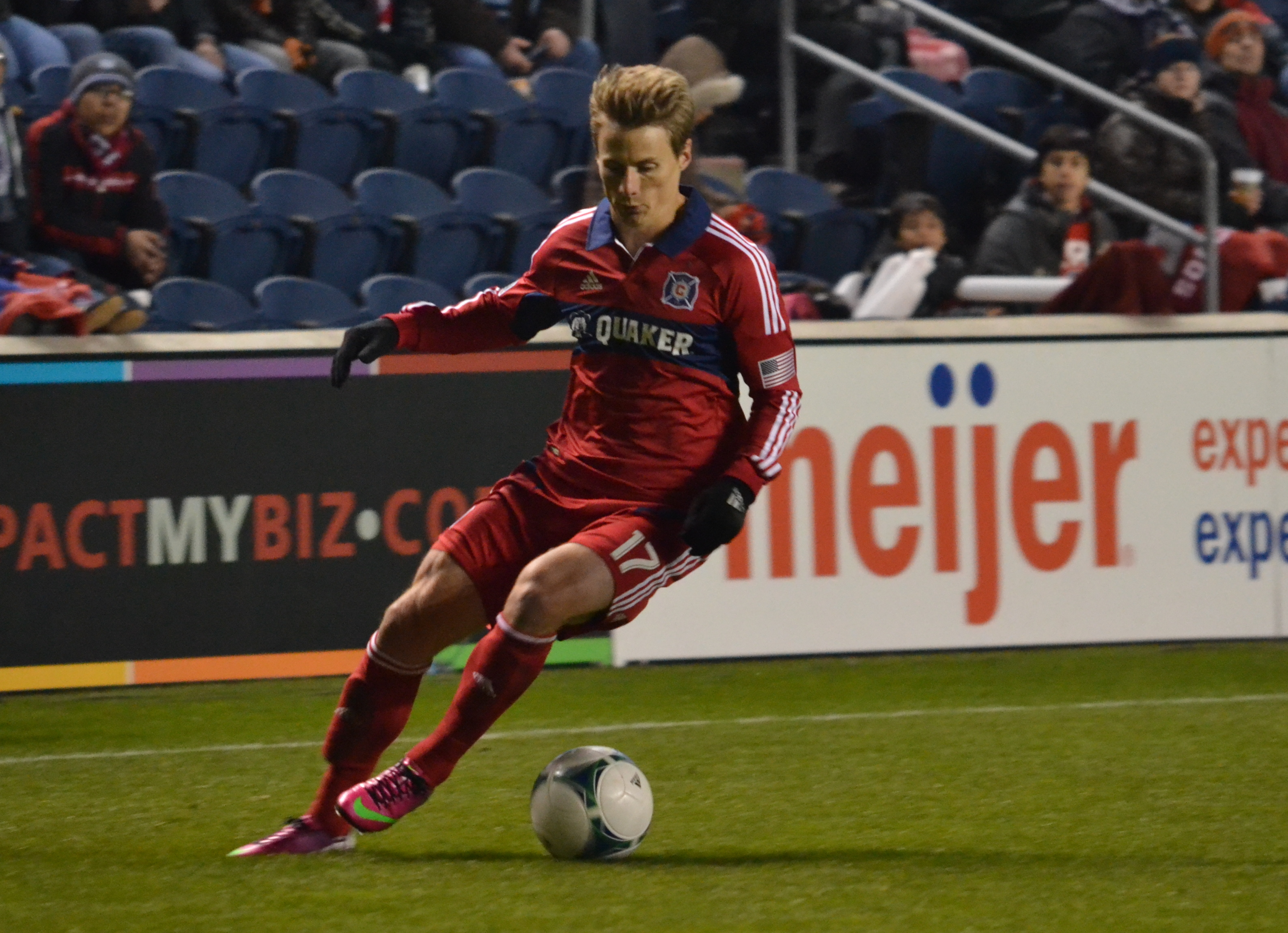
Chicago selected Chris Rolfe 29th overall. Rolfe appeared in 239 MLS matches and earned 10 cap with the US Men's National Team. An injury in 2010 ruled him out of participating in the 2010 FIFA World Cup.

Pick #	MLS Team	Player	Position	Affiliation
25	MetroStars (Note: #25: Real Salt Lake → Chicago Fire → D.C. United → MetroStars. January 14, 2005: MetroStars acquired this pick and pick #12 from D.C. United as final compensation for the March 2, 2004 trade which sent Jaime Moreno from MetroStars to D.C. United. Earlier the same day, D.C. United had acquired this pick from Chicago in exchange for D.C.'s natural second-round selection in the 2006 MLS SuperDraft. Chicago had acquired this pick and a second-round selection in the 2006 MLS SuperDraft from Real Salt Lake in exchange for forward Dipsy Selolwane and defender Evan Whitfield on December 30, 2004.)	(United States) Chris Corcoran	M	St. Johns University
26	C.D. Chivas USA	(United States) Aaron Lopez	D	UCLA
27	F.C. Dallas (Note: #27: Chicago Fire → FC Dallas. August 31, 2004: FC Dallas acquired this pick from Chicago in exchange for the discovery option on forward Andy Herron.)	(Canada) Winston Marshall	D	Wright State University
28	F.C. Dallas	(United States) Chris Gomez	GK	Brown University
29	Chicago Fire (Note: #29: San Jose Earthquakes → FC Dallas → Chicago Fire. January 14, 2005: Chicago acquired this pick from FC Dallas in exchange for goalkeeper Henry Ring and a second-round selection in the 2006 MLS SuperDraft. Earlier on the same day, FC Dallas had acquired this pick, the #6 pick, midfielder Richard Mulrooney, and midfielder Arturo Alvarez from San Jose in exchange for the #4 pick, midfielder Brad Davis, and an allocation.)	(United States) Chris Rolfe	F	University of Dayton
30	San Jose Earthquakes (Note: #30: MetroStars → San Jose Earthquakes. August 21, 2003: San Jose acquired this pick from MetroStars in exchange for a discovery player to be named later. The player was forward Andrzej Juskowiak.)	(United States) Victor Arbelaez	M	UNLV
31	San Jose Earthquakes (Note: #31: Colorado Rapids → San Jose Earthquakes. August 19, 2003: San Jose acquired this pick, pick #41, and a first-round selection in the 2004 MLS SuperDraft from Colorado in exchange for the rights to goalkeeper Joe Cannon.)	(United States) Orlando Ramirez	F	Fresno Pacific University
32	San Jose Earthquakes (Note: #32: Columbus Crew → San Jose Earthquakes. January 13, 2004: San Jose acquired this pick from Columbus in exchange for midfielder Manny Lagos.)	(United States) C.J. Klaas	D	University of Washington
33	New England Revolution (Note: #33: New England Revolution → Kansas City Wizards → Colorado Rapids → New England Revolution. January 14, 2005: New England re-acquired this pick from Colorado in exchange for pick #45 and a player to be named later. Colorado had acquired this pick and pick #36 from Kansas City in exchange for pick #16 on January 13, 2005. Info needed on how Kansas City acquired this pick from New England.)	(New Zealand) Tony Lochhead	D	UC Santa Barbara
34	Los Angeles Galaxy	(United States) Quavas Kirk*	F	Generation adidas
35	Chicago Fire (Note: #35: Kansas City Wizards → Chicago Fire. April 5, 2004: Chicago acquired this pick from Kansas City in exchange for midfielder Khari Stephenson.)	(Costa Rica) Gonzalo Segares	D	Virginia Commonwealth University
36	Chicago Fire (Note: #36: D.C. United → Kansas City Wizards → Colorado Rapids → Chicago Fire. June 11, 2004: Chicago acquired this pick (originally a conditional selection) from Colorado in exchange for forward Rey Ángel Martínez. To fulfill the trade requirements, Colorado acquired this pick and pick #33 from Kansas City in exchange for pick #16 on January 13, 2005. Kansas City had acquired this pick and pick #24 from D.C. United in exchange for a second-round selection in the 2004 MLS SuperDraft on January 16, 2004.)	(South Africa) Thabiso Khumalo	M	Coastal Carolina University

=== Round four ===
Pick #	MLS Team	Player	Position	Affiliation
37	Real Salt Lake	(United States) Luke Kreamalmeyer	M	Bradley University
38	C.D. Chivas USA	(United States) Esteban Arias	D	University of Connecticut
39	Chicago Fire	(Germany) Karim Deitz	F	Birmingham–Southern College
40	F.C. Dallas	(United States) Julian Nash	F	Creighton University
41	San Jose Earthquakes (Note: #41: San Jose Earthquakes → Colorado Rapids → San Jose Earthquakes. August 19, 2003: San Jose re-acquired this pick, pick #31, and a first-round selection in the 2004 MLS SuperDraft from Colorado in exchange for the rights to goalkeeper Joe Cannon. Colorado had acquired this pick (originally a conditional selection) from San Jose in exchange for midfielder Wes Hart on February 28, 2004.)	(Sweden) Antouman Jallow	F	University of Wisconsin–Milwaukee
42	San Jose Earthquakes (Note: #42: MetroStars → San Jose Earthquakes. December 10, 2004: San Jose acquired this pick from MetroStars in exchange for defender Jeff Agoos.)	(United States) James Twellman	D	Stanford University
43	Colorado Rapids	(Israel) Guy Melamed	D	Boston College
44	Columbus Crew	(United States) Knox Cameron	F	University of Michigan
45	Colorado Rapids (Note: #45: New England Revolution → Colorado Rapids. January 14, 2005: Colorado acquired this pick and a player to be named later from New England in exchange for pick #33.)	(United States) Amir Lowery	M	Wake Forest University
46	Los Angeles Galaxy	(Zimbabwe) Mubarike Chisoni	M	Coastal Carolina University
47	Kansas City Wizards	(United States) John Minagawa-Webster	M	Michigan State University
48	D.C. United (Note: #48: D.C. United → San Jose Earthquakes → D.C. United. January 14, 2005: D.C. United re-acquired this pick from San Jose for a player to be named later. San Jose had acquired this pick and a first-round selection in the 2003 MLS supplemental draft from D.C. United in exchange for forward Devin Barclay and a first-round selection in the 2003 MLS supplemental draft on February 11, 2003. (Note: "Earthquakes ship Barclay to D.C. United for draft picks". SI.com. February 11, 2003.))	(United States) Tim Merritt	D	University of North Carolina

=== Other draft day trades ===
- MetroStars traded its natural second-round selection in the 2006 MLS SuperDraft to Real Salt Lake in exchange for a youth international slot.

== Notable undrafted players ==
No.	Player	Pos.	Notes
1	(United States) Bobby Boswell^†	D	MLS Defender of the Year (2006); MLS Best XI (2006, 2014); U.S. national team (2006–07)
2	(United States) Chris Wondolowski^†~	F	Not picked in the SuperDraft; taken in the supplemental draft. He scored an MLS record 171 MLS goals.
3	(United States) Jeff Larentowicz ^	D	Not picked in the SuperDraft; taken in the supplemental draft. He is a member of the 400 games played club.

== See also ==
- Draft (sports)
- Generation Adidas
- Major League Soccer
- MLS SuperDraft
