= Union Bulldogs =

Union Bulldogs can refer to the athletic program of either of the following U.S. colleges and universities:

- Union University Bulldogs, an NCAA Division II institution in Jackson, Tennessee
- Union Commonwealth Bulldogs, an NAIA institution in Barbourville, Kentucky
