= Derek Smith (soccer) =

American soccer player and coach

Personal information
- Full name: Derek Smith
- Date of birth: July 17, 1980 (age 46)
- Place of birth: Hopkinsville, Kentucky, United States
- Height: 6 ft 2 in (1.88 m)
- Position: Defender

Team information
- Current team: Cincinnati Kings
- Number: 21

Youth career
- 2000–2003: Union Bulldogs

Senior career*
Years	Team	Apps	(Gls)
2001–2002	West Michigan Edge		
2004	Cocoa Expos	10	(0)
2004	Virginia Beach Mariners		
2005	Columbus Crew	0	(0)
2005–2006	Cincinnati Kings	37	(4)
2007	Minnesota Thunder	12	(0)
2010–2012	Cincinnati Kings	4	(1)

Managerial career
- 2006: College of Mount St. Joseph (assistant)
- * Club domestic league appearances and goals as of July 28, 2010

Derek Smith (born July 17, 1980, in Hopkinsville, Kentucky) is a retired American soccer player who last played for the Cincinnati Kings in the USL Premier Development League.

== Career ==
=== College and amateur ===
Smith attended Hopkinsville High School before playing soccer at Union College(KY) from 2000 to 2003. He was named the team Defensive Man of the Year and Most Valuable Player in 2002 and an All-American Honorable Mention selection and First Team All-Region in both 2001 and 2002. In 2001 and 2002, he spent the collegiate off season with the West Michigan Edge of the fourth division Premier Development League.

=== Professional ===
Undrafted out of college, Smith played for the Cocoa Expos of the PDL in the summer of 2004, before signing his first professional contract with the Virginia Beach Mariners of the USL First Division. In 2005, he signed with the Columbus Crew of Major League Soccer, and although he saw no time with the first team, he played two games with the reserves.

After being released by the Crew, Smith joined the Cincinnati Kings of the PDL, and played for them for two years. On February 17, 2007, the Minnesota Thunder announced the signing of Smith to a two-year contract. He played 12 games for Minnesota in 2007. Smith suffered a double sports hernia injury in the 2008 season. Smith returned for his second stint with the Cincinnati Kings in the PDL in 2009–2010.

== Coaching ==
Smith also coaches for the Blackhawks of St. Paul U15 C1 girls which he helped to get to state, and the Saint Paul Academy and Summit School Boys JV team, which he coached to a record of 10-6 and 48 goals scored. On April 21, 2006, the College of Mount St. Joseph hired Smith as an assistant with both the men's and women's soccer teams.
