= Luis Gallardo =

Panamanian footballer (born 1986)

Personal information
- Full name: Luis Miguel Gallardo Fuentes
- Date of birth: 27 June 1986 (age 40)
- Place of birth: Paso Canoas, Chiriquí, Panama
- Height: 1.76 m (5 ft 9 in)
- Positions: Winger; attacking midfielder

Youth career
- Pérez Zeledón

Senior career*
Years	Team	Apps	(Gls)
2001–2005	Pérez Zeledón	37	(8)
2005	Columbus Crew	0	(0)
2006–2007	Pérez Zeledón	36	(11)
2008	Tacuarembó	10	(0)
2008–2009	UCR	39	(2)
2009	Atlético Chiriquí	14	(0)
2010	Herediano	12	(0)
2010–2011	Atlético Veragüense	7	(1)

International career
2005–2007	Panama	5	(0)
- * Club domestic league appearances and goals as of March 27, 2009

Luis Miguel Gallardo Fuentes (born 27 June 1986) is a Panamanian footballer.

== Club career ==
Born in a Panama-Costa Rica border town, Gallardo played in Costa Rica for Pérez Zeledón from 2001 before joining Major League Soccer team Columbus Crew in April 2005, only to return to Pérez Zeledón after an unsuccessful spell. In February 2008 he made his debut for Uruguayan side Tacuarembó, but he returned to Costa Rica once again to play for UCR in summer 2008. A year later he moved across the border again after being snapped up by Atlético Chiriquí.

In January 2010 he returned to Costa Rica to play for Herediano in the Costa Rican Primera División, only to be released in April 2010.

== International career ==
Gallardo represented Panama at the 2005 FIFA World Youth Championship in the Netherlands.

Gallardo has made four appearances for the senior Panama national football team. His debut was a 2006 FIFA World Cup qualifying match against the United States on 12 October 2005 and his final game was a May 2007 friendly match against Colombia.

== Personal life ==
Born to Maria Erenia Fuentes and Jorge Gallardo, he has a sister named Georgina Vanessa Gallardo.
