= Mario Rodríguez (footballer, born 1981) =

Guatemalan footballer

Personal information
- Full name: Mario Rafael Rodríguez Rodríguez
- Date of birth: September 14, 1981 (age 45)
- Place of birth: Guatemala City, Guatemala
- Height: 1.75 m (5 ft 9 in)
- Position: Forward

Youth career
- 2000-2002: USAC

Senior career*
| Years | Team | Apps | (Gls) |
| 2002–2004 | Comunicaciones | 65 | (6) |
| 2004 | Alajuelense | 0 | (0) |
| 2004–2005 | Municipal | 17 | (0) |
| 2005 | Columbus Crew | 19 | (1) |
| 2006 | Miami FC | 18 | (7) |
| 2006–2014 | Municipal | 304 | (97) |
| 2014-2015 | Antigua | 8 | (2) |
| 2015 | USAC | 18 | (1) |

International career^{‡}
| 2003–2013 | Guatemala | 79 | (10) |
- * Club domestic league appearances and goals as of 14 March 2010 ‡ National team caps and goals as of 7 September 2013

Mario Rafael Rodríguez Rodríguez (born 14 September 1981) is a Guatemalan former professional footballer who played as a midfielder. He has played for local club Municipal.

Rodríguez has played locally also played for Comunicaciones and in Major League Soccer for Columbus Crew. He was also a member of the Guatemala national team.

== Club career ==
Rodríguez, nicknamed El Loco (Spanish for The Crazy Man), started his career in Guatemala in 2002 with Comunicaciones, where he would remain until 2004. In February 2004 during the 211th clasico between longtime arch-rivals Municipal and Comunicaciones, he collided with goalkeeper Danny Ortiz causing Ortiz to suffer a torn pericardium. Ortiz was taken to the Hospital Centro Médico where he died two hours later.

In 2005, he joined Columbus Crew from Costa Rican side Alajuelense, and in 2006, he played for Miami FC, and with 7 goals and 4 assists he was second in scoring for the club behind Brazilian forward Romário. He returned to Guatemala to play for Municipal for the 2007 Clausura.

He has been a productive player for Municipal. Although he has been the team's top scorer since joining, his past association with Comunicaciones has affected his relationship with some Municipal fans.

In March 2009, Rodríguez almost signed with Chunnam Dragons from the Korean League, only for the deal to fail through at the second attempt.

== International career ==
Rodríguez made his international debut in a January 2003 friendly match against El Salvador and has since been capped over 70 times for his country. He represented his country in 19 FIFA World Cup qualification matches as well as at the 2003 and 2007 CONCACAF Gold Cups.

In 2006, Rodríguez was recalled by Guatemala national coach Hernán Darío Gómez to play against Haiti. He scored a goal and then was recalled for a friendly in Guatemala City against Panama. He made his return to the national squad for the 2014 World Cup qualifying campaign, scoring three goals in the first two matches, against Saint Vincent and the Grenadines.

== Political career ==
On 12 March 2023, Rodriguez was proclaimed a candidate for the 2023 Guatemala City mayoral election with the National Convergence Front.

== Career statistics ==
=== International goals ===
Scores and results list. Guatemala's goal tally first.

| # | Date | Venue | Opponent | Score | Result | Competition |
|---|---|---|---|---|---|---|
| 1 | 8 June 2005 | Estadio Ricardo Saprissa, San José, Costa Rica | Costa Rica | 2-2 | 2-3 | 2006 FIFA World Cup qualification |
| 2 | 16 August 2006 | Tropical Park Stadium, Miami, United States | Haiti | 1-0 | 1-1 | Friendly match |
| 3 | 23 April 2008 | Estadio Mateo Flores, Guatemala City, Guatemala | Haiti | 1-0 | 1-0 | Friendly match |
| 4 | 14 June 2008 | Estadio Mateo Flores, Guatemala City, Guatemala | Saint Lucia | 1-0 | 6-0 | 2010 FIFA World Cup qualification |
| 5 | 6 August 2008 | RFK Memorial Stadium, Washington, D.C., United States | Bolivia | 3-0 | 3-0 | Friendly match |
| 6 | 10 September 2008 | Estadio Mateo Flores, Guatemala City, Guatemala | Cuba | 3-1 | 4-1 | 2010 FIFA World Cup qualification |
| 7 | 7 September 2010 | Nagai Stadium, Osaka, Japan | Japan | 1-2 | 1-2 | Friendly match |
| 8 | 2 September 2011 | Estadio Mateo Flores, Guatemala City, Guatemala | Saint Vincent and the Grenadines | 3-0 | 4-0 | 2014 FIFA World Cup qualification |
| 9 | 7 October 2011 | Arnos Vale Stadium, Kingstown, Saint Vincent and the Grenadines | Saint Vincent and the Grenadines | 1-0 | 3-0 | 2014 FIFA World Cup qualification |
| 10 | 7 October 2011 | Arnos Vale Stadium, Kingstown, Saint Vincent and the Grenadines | Saint Vincent and the Grenadines | 2-0 | 3-0 | 2014 FIFA World Cup qualification |

== Honours ==
Comunicaciones

- Liga Nacional de Guatemala: Clausura 2003

Municipal

- Liga Nacional de Guatemala: Clausura 2005, Apertura 2005, Clausura 2006, Apertura 2006, Clausura 2008, Clausura 2010, Apertura 2011
