= Jamal Sutton =

American soccer forward (born 1982)

Personal information
- Full name: Jamal Drewry-Sutton
- Date of birth: March 22, 1982 (age 44)
- Place of birth: Wichita, Kansas, United States
- Height: 5 ft 9 in (1.75 m)
- Position: Forward

Youth career
- 2000–2003: Missouri State Bears

Senior career*
| Years | Team | Apps | (Gls) |
| 2001 | Wichita Jets | | |
| 2002 | Sioux Falls Spitfire | | |
| 2003 | Chicago Fire Premier | 14 | (1) |
| 2004–2005 | Columbus Crew | 9 | (1) |
| 2006 | Seattle Sounders | 18 | (4) |
| 2007 | Charlotte Eagles | 8 | (2) |
- * Club domestic league appearances and goals

Jamal Sutton (born March 22, 1982) is an American former soccer forward who played professionally in Major League Soccer and the USL First Division.

Sutton played college soccer at Southwest Missouri State University, from 2000 to 2003. In his freshman year, Sutton was named the SMS Rookie of the Year, after scoring 3 goals and 4 assists. He finished his career at the school with 22 goals and 18 assists. During the 2001 collegiate offseason, Sutton played for the Wichita Jets. In 2002, he played for the Sioux Falls Spitfire. In 2003, he played for the Chicago Fire Premier as they went to the championship game where they fell to the Cape Cod Crusaders.

Upon graduating, Sutton was drafted 32nd overall in the 2004 MLS SuperDraft by the Columbus Crew of Major League Soccer. He saw very limited playing time as a rookie, however, appearing in only one game for five minutes. He played in eight games and scored a goal in 2005, but was released after the season. On April 1, 2006, the Seattle Sounders of USL First Division signed Sutton. He joined the Charlotte Eagles of the USL Second Division in June 2007.
