= Kyle Martino =

American soccer player (born 1981)

Personal information
- Full name: Kyle Hunter Martino
- Date of birth: February 19, 1981 (age 45)
- Place of birth: Atlanta, Georgia, U.S.
- Height: 5 ft 10 in (1.78 m)
- Position: Midfielder

College career
Years	Team	Apps	(Gls)
1999–2001	Virginia Cavaliers		

Senior career*
Years	Team	Apps	(Gls)
2002–2006	Columbus Crew	106	(10)
2006–2007	Los Angeles Galaxy	35	(3)
Total		141	(13)

International career
2002–2006	United States	8	(1)
- * Club domestic league appearances and goals

Kyle Hunter Martino (born February 19, 1981) is an American former professional soccer player who spent seven seasons with the Columbus Crew and Los Angeles Galaxy in Major League Soccer as a midfielder. He is currently a television soccer analyst and host.

== Career ==
=== High school ===
Martino attended Staples High School in Westport, Connecticut, where he played soccer and was named Gatorade National Player of the Year in 1998 after his senior season.

=== College ===
Martino attended the University of Virginia from 1999 to 2001. He played college soccer and scored 17 goals and provided 21 assists. In his junior season, Martino was named ACC Player of the Year. In both his sophomore and junior seasons, he was one of 15 finalists for the Hermann Trophy.

=== Professional ===
Martino left UVA after his junior season, signing a Project-40 contract with Major League Soccer (MLS) and entering the 2002 MLS Superdraft, where the Columbus Crew selected him eighth overall. He tallied two goals and five assists in 22 appearances and won the MLS Rookie of the Year Award, while running the Crew offense for much of the season. His following season was something of a disappointment, as Martino failed to develop into the dominant offensive force that many had expected, although he maintained a spot in the Crew's starting lineup. His third season began like the second with Martino failing to stimulate the offense, but a move up to withdrawn forward saw a resurgence of his offensive abilities, and through the 2004 season he led the Crew to the longest unbeaten streak in MLS history. Martino had a down year in 2005, not scoring a goal and in early 2006 he was dealt to the LA Galaxy in a four-player deal. He and John Wolyniec were traded for Joseph Ngwenya and Ned Grabavoy. During the first 2006 match between the Crew and the Galaxy, before the trade, it was Martino who, in the last few seconds, scored the game's only goal, delivering a defeat to his soon-to-be teammates.

In November 2006, Martino had a trial at Dutch Eredivisie side NEC Nijmegen, but did not earn a contract. Martino also had a trial at Leeds United.

Martino retired from professional soccer on February 19, 2008, having been advised by doctors that injuries he sustained throughout his career were severe enough that it would be in his best interest to retire.

=== International ===
Martino played for the United States at the 2001 World Youth Championship in Argentina. He saw little playing time for the senior national team, getting his first cap on November 17, 2002, against El Salvador. He scored his only international goal against Panama on October 12, 2005, in a 2-0 World Cup qualifier U.S. victory.

== International goals ==
No.	Date	Venue	Opponent	Score	Result	Competition
1.	12 October 2005	Foxboro, United States	Panama	1–0	2–0	2006 FIFA World Cup qualification

== Post-playing career ==
Until the beginning of the 2020/21 season, Martino was a studio analyst and color commentator for NBC Sports coverage of the English Premier League. He was previously a color commentator for MLS on the ESPN family of networks. In addition to commentating, he is also a television host featured on Travel Channel's 36 Hours and NBC's Spartan Race.

On November 6, 2017, Martino announced he was leaving NBC Sports temporarily to stand as a candidate for president of the United States Soccer Federation in the February 2018 election. His campaign was unsuccessful.

On September 9, 2025, Martino joined the ownership group for USL Championship club Atlético Dallas.

== Career statistics ==
Club performance			League		Cup		Playoffs		North America		Total	
Season	Club	League	Apps	Goals	Apps	Goals	Apps	Goals	Apps	Goals	Apps	Goals
2002	Columbus Crew	Major League Soccer	22	2	4	1	4	0	–	–	30	3
2003	Columbus Crew	Major League Soccer	22	2	0	0	–	–	–	–	22	2
2004	Columbus Crew	Major League Soccer	29	5	2	0	2	0	–	–	33	5
2005	Columbus Crew	Major League Soccer	27	5	1	1	–	–	–	–	28	6
2006	Columbus Crew	Major League Soccer	6	1	0	0	–	–	–	–	6	1
2006	Los Angeles Galaxy	Major League Soccer	9	0	0	0	–	–	–	–	9	0
2007	Los Angeles Galaxy	Major League Soccer	26	3	–	–	–	–	3	0	29	3
Career total			141	13	7	2	6	0	3	0	157	15

== Honors ==
Columbus Crew

- Lamar Hunt U.S. Open Cup: 2002
- MLS Supporters' Shield: 2004

Individual

- MLS Rookie of the Year: 2002

== Personal life ==
Martino married actress Eva Amurri on October 29, 2011. They have three children, a daughter, Marlowe and two sons, Major and Mateo.

On November 15, 2019, the couple announced that they were separating. As of March 2020, the couple have finalized their divorce before welcoming their third child.
