= Jonny Walker (soccer) =

American soccer player (born 1974)

Personal information
- Date of birth: September 13, 1974 (age 52)
- Place of birth: Torrance, California, United States
- Height: 6 ft 3 in (1.91 m)
- Position: Goalkeeper

College career
Years	Team	Apps	(Gls)
1994	Louisville Cardinals		

Senior career*
Years	Team	Apps	(Gls)
1994	Memphis Jackals	?	(?)
1996	Dallas Burn	0	(0)
1997	Jacksonville Cyclones	11	(0)
1998–2002	Universidad Católica	74	(0)
1998	→ Huachipato (loan)	11	(0)
2003	Colo-Colo	17	(0)
2003–2004	MetroStars	42	(0)
2005–2006	Columbus Crew	16	(0)

International career
2004	United States	3	(0)

Managerial career
- 2009–: Memphis Tigers (Associate Head Coach)
- * Club domestic league appearances and goals

Jonny Walker (born September 13, 1974) is an American former professional soccer goalkeeper who is currently the associate head coach of the University of Memphis Women's Soccer Team. Walker played professionally in Chile and the United States, including two stints with Major League Soccer (MLS). He earned three caps with the United States Men's National Team (USMNT). Walker was the first American to establish a successful professional soccer career in South America.

== Playing career ==
In the summer of 1994, Jonny Walker played for the Memphis Jackals of the USISL. He then played one season with the University of Louisville and still holds the record for most saves in a match (17), versus Evansville (September 8, 1994). He also has the most saves in a single season for a Cardinal with 151 (1994). He was named to the All-Metro Conference First Team in 1994. Walker represented the University of Louisville at the 1995 World University Games in Japan. He also participated in the 1995 Olympic Festival games in Denver, where he played for the South Team. Walker was one of only two goalkeepers in the country to be invited for full time residency at the ARCO Olympic Training Center in preparation for the '96 Olympic Games.

Upon the formation of Major League Soccer (MLS) in 1996, Walker was drafted 28th overall in the 1996 MLS Supplemental Draft, and became a third-string goalkeeper of the 1996 Dallas Burn, behind Mark Dodd. Unhappy with his situation, he left MLS and played for the now-defunct Jacksonville Cyclones of the A-League.

On a recommendation, Walker went to Chile and signed with First Division Club, Universidad Católica. They loaned him out to Club Deportivo Huachipato of Chile's First Division in 1998, in which we was named Team MVP, then U. Catolica brought him back the following year. He became the starting goalkeeper for the club, playing in multiple Copa Libertadores tournaments, which included wins against Argentina's Boca Juniors and Brazil's Flamengo. From 1997 to 2002, Walker broke numerous national records for Universidad Catolica. In 1999, U. Catolica finished runners-up in the Chilean National Championship. In 2001, Walker received Chilean Goalkeeper of the Year honors, while U. Catolica finished Runners-Up in the Chilean National Championship. That year, U. Catolica advanced to play in Copa Mercosur for the fourth straight season. They also competed in the Copa Libertadores. In 2002, Walker was named Best Goalkeeper of the Chilean Apertura National Championship as well set a Club record going 708 minutes (almost nine games) without being scored on, a record that held until 2008. Also in 2002, Walker led U. Catolica to win the Chilean Apertura National Championship. He was also named Best Goalkeeper in Round One of prestigious South American Championship, Copa Libertadores, later that year.

In 2003, Walker signed with Chilean club, Colo-Colo, the only Chilean club to ever win the Copa Libertadores. Colo Colo finished Runners-Up in the Chilean Apertura National Championship that year and also played in the 2003 Copa Libertadores.

Walker came back to the US later that year, signing with the MetroStars, after starting goalkeeper Tim Howard signed with Manchester United. In 2003 with the MetroStars, Walker became the third goalkeeper in MLS history to finish a season with sub-1.00 Goals Against Average (GAA), capturing the league-best 0.95 GAA. That same year, Walker was the MLS Player of the Month for August and the MetroStars finished as Runners-Up in the US Open Cup. In 2005, The MetroStars signed Tony Meola and traded Walker to the Columbus Crew. With the Crew, Walker won the team's 2005 Defensive Player of the Year and finished second in MLS with a GAA of 1.12. At the end of 2005 season, Walker injured his back and was sidelined until he retired in 2006 due to a chronic, inoperable back injury.

Walker started and played three matches for the United States Men's National Team, including a 1–0 shutout win over Mexico on April 28, 2004. His first cap was against Denmark in January 2004.

Walker has been very involved with the Leukemia and Lymphoma Society, giving free soccer clinics to kids who raise the most money through their soccer club for the Soccer Kicks for Cancer program. In 2005, Walker was named the Ambassador for the State of Tennessee for the Leukemia and Lymphoma Society.

== Coaching career ==
In the fall of 2009, Jonny Walker became the Goalkeeper Coach for the University of Memphis Women's Soccer Team. In 2010, Walker moved to Assistant Coach and then promoted to Associate Head Coach in 2019 and continues in that position to date. From 2009 to 2019, Walker has helped coach the Lady Tigers to five conference championship titles.

== Honors ==
Universidad Católica

- Primera División de Chile: 2002 Apertura

Colo-Colo

- Primera División de Chile runner-up: 2003 Apertura

MetroStars

- Lamar Hunt U.S. Open Cup runner-up: 2003

Individual

- Primera División de Chile Best Goalkeeper: 2002
- Copa Libertadores' First Stage Best Goalkeeper: 2002
- August MLS Player of the Month: 2003
- MLS Team Defensive Player of the Year: 2005
