= Mark Schulte =

American soccer player

Personal information
- Full name: Mark Schulte
- Date of birth: October 4, 1977 (age 49)
- Place of birth: Brecksville, Ohio, United States
- Height: 6 ft 3 in (1.91 m)
- Position: Defender

Youth career
- 1996–1999: Dayton Flyers

Senior career*
Years	Team	Apps	(Gls)
1998–1999	Twin Cities Tornado		
2000	Tampa Bay Mutiny	0	(0)
2000	→ Minnesota Thunder (loan)	17	(0)
2001–2003	Minnesota Thunder		
2002–2003	Cleveland Force (indoor)	16	(0)
2004	ÍBV Vestmannaeyjar		
2005	Columbus Crew	19	(0)
2005–2006	Montevideo Wanderers		
2006	ÍBV Vestmannaeyjar		
2007–2008	Cleveland City Stars	38	(4)
2008	→ Minnesota Thunder (loan)	6	(0)
2009–2010	Carolina RailHawks	51	(2)
- * Club domestic league appearances and goals as of September 22, 2010

Mark Schulte (born October 4, 1977, in Brecksville, Ohio) is an American retired soccer player who last played for Carolina RailHawks in the USSF Division 2 Professional League. He is currently the Formulations Lead Scientist at LoamBio. His research interests are gas to liquid fuels. In addition to his research activities, Mark serves as a teaching assistant for a graduate transport phenomena course.

He was a two-time USL Second Division player of the year and has played professionally in Iceland and Uruguay as well as with the Columbus Crew of Major League Soccer. On January 27, 2010, he was ranked 10th in the USL Second Division Top 15 of the Decade, which announced a list of the best and most influential players of the previous decade.

== Career ==
=== College and amateur ===
Schulte attended the University of Dayton, playing on the men's soccer team from 1996 to 1999. In 1998 and 1999, he played as an amateur with the Twin Cities Tornado of the Premier Development League during the college off seasons. He was named the 1999 PDL Defender of the Year.

=== Professional ===
In February 2000 the Tampa Bay Mutiny selected Schulte in the fifth round (fifty-first overall) in the 2000 MLS SuperDraft. The Mutiny sent him on loan to the Minnesota Thunder of the USL A-League for the 2000 season before waiving him in 2001. He then played from 2001 through 2003 with the Thunder. Schulte also played for the Cleveland Force in Major Indoor Soccer League from 2001 to 2002. In 2004, he had an unsuccessful trial with Crewe Alexandra before signing with ÍBV Vestmannaeyjar in the Icelandic Úrvalsdeild (First Division).

He returned to the United States and joined the Columbus Crew for the 2005 Major League Soccer season. At the end of 2005, Schulte moved to Uruguay where he signed with the Montevideo Wanderers of the Primera División Uruguaya, but saw very little playing time due to a chipped bone in his ankle, and moved back to ÍBV Vestmannaeyjar for the 2006 Icelandic season.

On February 22, 2007, the expansion Cleveland City Stars of the USL Second Division announced that Schulte had become the first player to sign with the team. He was the 2007 USL-2 Defender of the Year. In 2008, the Stars won the USL-2 championship. Following the championship game, Schulte signed with the Minnesota Thunder of USL-1 on loan from the Stars. On February 3, 2009, Schulte signed with the Carolina RailHawks of USL-1.

Schulte was not listed on the 2011 roster for Carolina released April 4, 2011.
