= Marcus Storey =

American soccer forward (born 1982)

Personal information
- Full name: Marcus Lorenzo Storey
- Date of birth: November 9, 1982 (age 43)
- Place of birth: Chicago, Illinois, United States
- Height: 5 ft 9 in (1.75 m)
- Position: Forward

Youth career
- –2001: Houston Texans

College career
| Years | Team | Apps | (Gls) |
| 2001–2004 | North Carolina Tar Heels | 106 | (39) |

Senior career*
| Years | Team | Apps | (Gls) |
| 2004 | Carolina Dynamo | 12 | (15) |
| 2005 | Columbus Crew | 12 | (0) |
| 2006 | Houston Dynamo | 7 | (4) |
| 2008 | TuS Heeslingen | 16 | (9) |
| 2008–2009 | SV Wilhelmshaven | 29 | (12) |
| 2009–2010 | SV Drochtersen/Assel | 22 | (8) |
| 2010–2011 | SV Wilhelmshaven | 21 | (3) |
| 2012–2013 | BSV Schwarz-Weiß Rehden | 26 | (3) |
| Total | | 145 | (54) |
- * Club domestic league appearances and goals

Marcus Lorenzo Storey (born November 9, 1982) is an American former soccer player who played as a forward.

== Career ==
Storey was born in Chicago, Illinois. He played college soccer at the University of North Carolina. Following being named the ACC Rookie of the Year in 2001, Storey was named to the All-ACC first team as a junior and a senior. He finished his career with the Tar Heels with 39 goals and 19 assists in 106 games.

Upon his graduation, Storey was drafted 20th overall in the 2005 MLS SuperDraft by the Columbus Crew. He was traded to Houston prior to the 2006 season. However, after spending the season with the Dynamo, he was cut during the 2007 pre-season, a move to make the team roster-compliant.

In January 2008 he joined TuS Heeslingen in Germany, in the Oberliga (Fourth division), he left the club in June 2008 and he joined SV Wilhelmshaven in the new (Third division) and on June 30, 2009, left Wilhelmshaven to sign for SV Drochtersen/Assel.
