= Domenic Mediate =

American soccer player

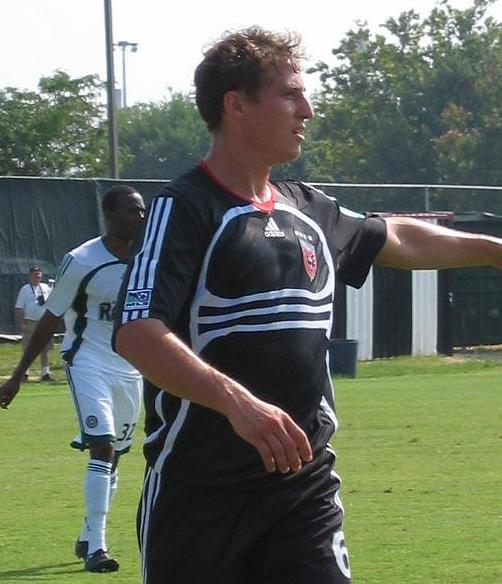

Personal information
- Full name: Stanton Domenic Mediate
- Date of birth: June 1, 1982 (age 44)
- Place of birth: Sheridan, Wyoming, United States
- Height: 5 ft 9 in (1.75 m)
- Positions: Defender; midfielder

College career
Years	Team	Apps	(Gls)
2001–2004	Maryland Terrapins		

Senior career*
Years	Team	Apps	(Gls)
2005	Columbus Crew	11	(1)
2006–2008	D.C. United	26	(0)
2009	Puerto Rico Islanders	12	(1)
- * Club domestic league appearances and goals as of 20 October 2009

Domenic Mediate (born June 1, 1982, in Sheridan, Wyoming) is an American former professional soccer player who played for D.C. United in Major League Soccer and Puerto Rico Islanders of the USL First Division.

== Career ==
=== College and amateur ===
Mediate grew up in Southlake, Texas, attended Carroll High School, played club soccer for Dallas Solar, and played college soccer at the University of Maryland, making 3 consecutive College Cup appearances. He ended his college career with 27 goals and 17 assists and was named to the All-ACC first team in 2004. Mediate made the Atlantic Coast Conference Academic Honor Roll in 2002 and 2003 and was a four-time Academic All-District Men's Soccer Team selection

=== Professional ===
Mediate was Columbus Crew's second pick (23rd overall) in the 2005 MLS SuperDraft. After a year with the Crew, appearing in 11 games (four starts) with one goal and an assist, he was traded to D.C. United on March 14, 2006, for a 2007 draft pick. Mediate made seven starts for the D.C. reserves in 2006, scoring a goal and logging two assists. He had worked his way into United's first team, appearing in eight games with two starts (despite having to miss time due to a concussion) when his right leg (distal fibula) was broken in a game against Los Angeles Galaxy on August 8, 2006. The injury required surgery and ended Mediate's season. He was waived by United during the 2007 pre-season, but on June 28, 2007, D.C. United had announced that Mediate had re-signed with the club.

== Personal ==
The son of Stan and Chris Mediate, Domenic has four siblings: sister Angela, and brothers Carmine, Rocco, and Vincent. Carmine is a golfer for Baylor University and Vincent is an ODP soccer player for Dallas Solar Red. The siblings are distant cousins of PGA Tour professional golfer Rocco Mediate. In high school, Domenic was a National Honor Society student, and received US Achievement Academy national awards in 1996, 1997 and 1998.

He is an occasional participant in NYC's weekly Bayards kickabout group.

== Honors ==
=== Club ===
==== D.C. United ====
- Supporter's Shield: 2007

==== Puerto Rico Islanders ====
- CFU Club Championship runner-up: 2009
