= Eric Vasquez =

American soccer player

Personal information
- Full name: Eric Vasquez
- Date of birth: November 18, 1982 (age 43)
- Place of birth: Miami, Florida, United States
- Height: 5 ft 10 in (1.78 m)
- Position: Midfielder

College career
Years	Team	Apps	(Gls)
2001–2003	UCF Knights	50	(6)

Senior career*
Years	Team	Apps	(Gls)
2003–2004	Central Florida Kraze	25	(6)
2005–2006	Columbus Crew	23	(3)
2007–2008	Miami FC	40	(6)
2007–2008	→ Orlando Sharks (indoor)	7	(5)
- * Club domestic league appearances and goals as of 2 October 2008 (UTC) ‡ National team caps and goals as of 30 November 2006

Eric Vasquez (born November 18, 1982, in Miami, Florida) is an American soccer player, who last played as a midfielder for Miami FC.

Vasquez played college soccer at the University of Central Florida from 2001 to 2003. He was twice named to the All Atlantic Sun First Team and in 2003 a Second Team All American. He also played with the PDL League's Central Florida Kraze.

He was drafted in the second round, 20th overall, by the Columbus Crew in the 2005 MLS Supplemental Draft. Following the 2006 season, Vasquez was waived by the Crew. 2007 Saw Vasquez join the USL-1 Miami FC. There, he was the leading scorer for the team. In the fall of 2007, he signed with the Orlando Sharks of the Major Indoor Soccer League. He later finished the 2008 season with USL-1 Miami FC. where he played the season under recent knee surgery. After the season according to official Miami FC statements he retired due to microfracture knee surgery.

Vasquez is currently a director for the Miami Breakers FC youth academy.

== Honors ==
=== Central Florida Kraze ===
- USL Premier Development League Champions (1): 2004
