= Knox Cameron =

American soccer player

Personal information
- Full name: Knox Cameron
- Date of birth: September 17, 1983 (age 43)
- Place of birth: Kingston, Jamaica
- Height: 6 ft 3 in (1.91 m)
- Position: Forward

Youth career
- Pasco SC

College career
Years	Team	Apps	(Gls)
2001–2004	Michigan Wolverines		

Senior career*
Years	Team	Apps	(Gls)
2003	Brooklyn Knights		
2004	Michigan Bucks	16	(15)
2005–2006	Columbus Crew	30	(4)
2007–2011	Canton Celtic	22	(8)
2009	Michigan Bucks	1	(0)
2012–2013	Detroit City FC	9	(8)
2016	AFC Ann Arbor		

International career^{‡}
2002–2003	United States U20	12	(2)
- * Club domestic league appearances and goals as of 25 May 2012 ‡ National team caps and goals as of 25 September 2012

Knox Cameron (born September 17, 1983) is a former soccer player who most recently played for AFC Ann Arbor in the National Premier Soccer League. Born in Jamaica, he represented the United States at the youth level.

== Career ==
=== College and amateur ===
Cameron grew up in New York City, attended Cardinal Spellman High School in The Bronx, and played college soccer at the University of Michigan, where he is second in the school's all-time record for goals (28) and points (72), and was named Big Ten Player of the Year his junior year.

Playing in the indoor and rec leagues while in Michigan, Cameron excelled in the bare-foot method of playing soccer, and once scored 14 goals in an indoor soccer game while playing with no shoes on.

During his college years Cameron also played in the USL Premier Development League for the Brooklyn Knights and the Michigan Bucks.

Knox also played for Pasco Soccer Club from Wayne, NJ during his high school years. He helped the team win countless tournaments and was one of a handful of players from the club to move on to play professional soccer.

=== Professional ===
Cameron suffered a serious knee injury while playing for the Michigan Bucks, and subsequently missed much of his senior year at Michigan. As a result of this, and doubts over his signability, Cameron slipped to the fourth round of the 2005 MLS SuperDraft, where he was drafted by the Columbus Crew. He went on to play 30 games and score 4 goals for the team over the next two years, but following the 2006 season, he was waived by the team. During his time with the Crew he played a friendly against English side Everton and thanked them on the scoreboard for coming to Columbus so he could beat them.

Following his release by the Crew, Cameron played for amateur team Canton Celtic, which plays in Michigan's MUSL Men's Open 1st Division. Celtic won the Michigan section of the USASA National Amateur Cup Championship, and represented the state at the 2008 USASA Regional tournament in Bowling Green, Kentucky.

Cameron returned to play for the Michigan Bucks in the USL Premier Development League in 2009, and then signed with Detroit City FC in 2012. He made his DCFC debut against the Erie Admirals on May 26, 2012, scoring the first goal in a 3–0 victory. He continued to play for DCFC in 2013, and scored two goals in their opener and another in the home opener. Cameron scored again in DCFC's 2–0 over Zanseville AFC, giving him 4 goals on the season.

=== Post-Professional ===
Cameron now is a co-owner and player for AFC Ann Arbor in Ann Arbor, Michigan. Cameron also helps with a youth soccer club called Saline FC.

=== International ===
Cameron elected to represent the United States internationally, and played for various youth national teams, being brought to UAE in 2003 for FIFA World Youth Championship.
