= Stephen Herdsman =

Jamaican-born American soccer player

Personal information
- Full name: Stephen Herdsman
- Date of birth: October 6, 1974 (age 52)
- Place of birth: Kingston, Jamaica
- Position: Defender

College career
Years	Team	Apps	(Gls)
–2000	Cornerstone Golden Eagles		

Senior career*
Years	Team	Apps	(Gls)
2000	West Michigan Edge		
2001–2003	Colorado Rapids	28	(0)
2004–2005	Columbus Crew	15	(0)
2009	Michigan Bucks		
2016	Grand Rapids FC	0	(0)

Managerial career
- Cornerstone University (coach)
- Midwest United FC (Director)
- * Club domestic league appearances and goals

Stephen Herdsman (born October 6, 1974), is an American former soccer defender now coaching three-time national champion Midwest United FC of Grand Rapids, MI as well as Cornerstone University of the NAIA of Grand Rapids, MI.

== Career ==
Herdsman played college soccer at Cornerstone University until 2000, while also playing in the Premier Development League with the West Michigan Edge.

Herdsman was drafted 17th overall in the 2001 MLS SuperDraft by the Colorado Rapids. With his blazing speed, Herdsman earned a spot on the team as an outside back, starting 16 games for the Rapids as a rookie. He saw his playing time decline in 2002, however, starting only 9 games, although he started all five of the Rapids' playoff games. After playing in only three games in the 2003 season, however, Herdsman announced his retirement from professional soccer, reportedly due to personality conflicts with Rapids head coach Tim Hankinson. Steve also retired from the MLS because of an injury to his leg. Steve is now a Director with Midwest United FC.

After finishing the season with the West Michigan Edge, Herdsman's rights were traded from the Rapids to the Columbus Crew, and he switched teams. Although he began the season as a starting outside back for the Crew, Herdsman lost his spot to Nelson Akwari and Chris Wingert, and ended the season having appeared in only eight games. After playing in just seven games in 2005, he was released.

In 2009, Herdsman signed with the Michigan Bucks of the USL Premier Development League.

In 2016, Herdsman was named in NPSL side Grand Rapids FC's roster, but did not appear once.
