= Devin Barclay =

American football and soccer player (born 1983)

- Born: April 9, 1983 (age 43); Annapolis, Maryland, U.S.
- Height: 5 ft 11 in (1.80 m)
Association football career
- Full name: Devin Barclay
- Position: Forward
Senior career*
Years	Team	Apps	(Gls)
2001	Tampa Bay Mutiny	23	(3)
2002	San Jose Earthquakes	12	(0)
2003	D.C. United	3	(0)
2004–2005	Columbus Crew	4	(0)
International career
2001–2003	United States U20	15	(1)
2002	United States U23	4	(0)
- * Club domestic league appearances and goals
- Football career

Profile
- Position: Placekicker

Career information
- College: Ohio State (2007–2010)

Awards and highlights
- Second-team All-Big Ten (2010)

Devin Barclay (born April 9, 1983) is an American former football placekicker for the Ohio State Buckeyes. Prior to that, he was formerly a professional soccer player, who last played for the Columbus Crew of Major League Soccer.

== Biography ==
Barclay initially skipped college, opting instead to sign a Project-40 contract with MLS in 2001, at the age of 18, which allocated him to the Tampa Bay Mutiny. Barclay made a significant impact on a very bad Mutiny team as a rookie, appearing in 23 games, 12 starts, and scoring three goals and two assists. The Mutiny was contracted after the 2001 season; Barclay was selected 8th overall in the 2002 MLS Allocation Draft by the San Jose Earthquakes. Barclay did not make much of an impact on the side that had just won MLS Cup, disappointingly only appearing in 12 games, and registering no goals or assists. He was traded to D.C. United in exchange for a draft pick, but disappointed in D.C. as well; he only appeared in three games for United, as coach Ray Hudson preferred not to play young players. He was again traded after the 2003 season, joining the Columbus Crew, his fourth team in four seasons. He made little impact on the Crew, however, again appearing in only three games in 2004. After appearing only once in the 2005 season, Barclay was released by Columbus on November 15, 2005.

Barclay represented the U.S. national team at the Under-18, Under-20, and Under-23 levels, but his playing time with those teams dwindled as he was unable to break into an MLS side.

Stifled by the lack of playing time and hampered by injuries, Barclay retired from soccer. He began learning how to kick field goals and was able to walk on at Ohio State University. As a junior, Barclay was second on the placekicking depth chart at Ohio State until Aaron Pettrey was injured on October 31, 2009, in a game against New Mexico State. Barclay became the starting kicker going forward.

He scored the conference championship winning kick against the Iowa Hawkeyes on November 14, 2009. The win meant that Ohio State would play in the Rose Bowl, as well as ensuring Ohio State at least a share of the 2009 Big Ten Championship.

Barclay started off the 2010 season well, tying the Ohio State record with 5 field goals on 6 attempts in week 2 against the University of Miami. He was named the Big Ten Special Teams Player of the Week for his efforts. He would finish the season 20-for-24 on field goals. Barclay never missed a point after touchdown in his career as a Buckeye.

Now, Devin working at Nike as men's soccer athlete manager, before was the director of coaching at the Colorado Rush soccer team.
