= 1998 USISL A-League =

USISL A-League
- Season: 1998
- Champions: Rochester Raging Rhinos (1st Title)
- Premiers: Rochester Raging Rhinos (1st Title)
- Matches: 392
- Goals: 1,292 (3.3 per match)
- Best Player: (United States) Mark Baena, Seattle Sounders
- Top goalscorer: (United States) Mark Baena, Seattle Sounders (24 goals)
- Best goalkeeper: (Canada) Pat Onstad, Rochester Raging Rhinos

The 1998 USISL A-League was an American Division II league run by the United Systems of Independent Soccer Leagues during the summer of 1998.

== Regular season ==
=== Northeast Division ===
Pos	Team	Pld	W	SOW	SOL	L	GF	GA	GD	Pts
1	Rochester Rhinos	28	23	1	1	3	72	15	+57	70
2	Montreal Impact	28	13	8	2	5	47	33	+14	47
3	Staten Island Vipers	28	15	1	1	11	46	37	+9	46
4	Long Island Rough Riders	28	14	3	1	10	46	35	+11	45
5	Worcester Wildfire	28	10	2	2	14	37	50	−13	32
6	Toronto Lynx	28	8	1	2	17	27	42	−15	25
7	Connecticut Wolves	28	2	5	3	18	32	57	−25	11

=== Atlantic Division ===
Pos	Team	Pld	W	SOW	SOL	L	GF	GA	GD	Pts
1	Richmond Kickers	28	18	3	2	5	48	22	+26	57
2	Hershey Wildcats	28	17	2	1	8	51	31	+20	53
3	Hampton Roads Mariners	28	15	1	3	9	44	39	+5	46
4	Charleston Battery	28	11	1	1	15	37	40	−3	34
5	Jacksonville Cyclones	28	10	0	2	16	36	53	−17	30
6	Atlanta Ruckus	28	7	0	1	20	31	67	−36	21
7	Raleigh Flyers	28	5	0	2	21	31	66	−35	15

=== Central Division ===
Pos	Team	Pld	W	SOW	SOL	L	GF	GA	GD	Pts
1	Nashville Metros	28	18	2	1	7	70	31	+39	56
2	Minnesota Thunder	28	16	3	1	8	52	33	+19	51
3	Milwaukee Rampage	28	16	1	3	8	61	39	+22	49
4	New Orleans Storm	28	14	1	1	12	53	50	+3	43
5	Cincinnati Riverhawks	28	11	0	0	17	48	65	−17	33
6	El Paso Patriots	28	9	3	1	15	51	54	−3	30
7	Albuquerque Geckos	28	5	0	1	22	39	100	−61	15

=== Pacific Division ===
Pos	Team	Pld	W	SOW	SOL	L	GF	GA	GD	Pts
1	San Diego Flash	28	20	1	1	6	58	23	+35	61
2	Seattle Sounders	28	17	1	0	10	63	28	+35	52
3	Orange County Zodiac	28	15	1	3	9	49	43	+6	46
4	Vancouver 86ers	28	13	2	1	12	55	42	+13	41
5	MLS Project 40	28	10	1	2	15	45	55	−10	31
6	San Francisco Bay Seals	28	9	1	5	13	31	47	−16	28
7	California Jaguars	28	6	0	1	21	32	95	−63	18

== Conference Quarterfinals ==
=== Eastern Conference ===
September 12, 1998
7:35 PM EST

Rochester Rhinos (NY)	3–0	Charleston Battery (SC)
Yari Allnutt; Jimmy Glenn (35:10); Mike Kirmse (81:20)	Report	(yellow card) 44' Robert Rosario; (yellow card) 66' Todd Miller

Frontier Field, Rochester, New York
Attendance: 9,673
September 12, 1998

Hershey Wildcats (PA)	1–1	Hampton Roads Mariners (VA)
Kyle Swords 49'		18' Greg Richards
Penalties
	4–3

Hersheypark Stadium, Hershey, Pennsylvania
Attendance: 2,089
September 12, 1998

Montreal Impact (QC)	3–1	Staten Island Vipers (NY)
Giuliano Oliviero 3'; Kevin Lamey 66'; Kevin Wilson 90'		2' Marvin Oliver

Complexe sportif Claude-Robillard, Montreal, Quebec
Attendance: 9,673
September 13, 1998

Richmond Kickers (VA)	0–0	Long Island Rough Riders (NY)
Penalties
	4–3

University of Richmond Stadium, Richmond, Virginia
Attendance: 1,798

=== Western Conference ===
September 12, 1998
7:30 PM (PDT)

San Diego Flash (CA)	3–1	Vancouver 86ers (BC)
Nate Hetherington 22', 74'; Jamie Munro (red card) 41'; Carlos Farias 51'; Jerome Watson 90'	Report	19' Jason Jordan

Devore Stadium, Chula Vista, California
Attendance: 4,178
September 12, 1998

Nashville Metros (TN)	2–2	New Orleans Storm (LA)
Vince Martinez (red card) 35'; Martin Reynders 41'; 78' (pen.)		23' Ricardo Blanchard; 53' (pen.) Gabe Gentile
Penalties
	2–4

Columbia/HCA Complex, Nashville, Tennessee
Attendance: 650
September 13, 1998

Seattle Sounders (WA)	2–1	Orange County Zodiac (CA)
Peter Hattrup 63'; Brandon Prideaux (yellow card) 73'; Dick McCormick 76' (pen.)	Report	22' Eddie Soto; (yellow card) 60' Steve Patterson; (yellow card) 67' Ken Hesse

Memorial Stadium, Seattle, Washington
Attendance: 4,371
Referee: Mohammed Sagakhaneh

== Conference semifinals ==
=== Eastern Conference semifinal 1 ===
September 17, 1998

Hershey Wildcats (PA)	0–0	Richmond Kickers (VA)
Penalties
	3–2

Hersheypark Stadium, Hershey, Pennsylvania
Attendance: 2,296
September 20, 1998

Richmond Kickers (VA)	2–4	Hershey Wildcats (PA)
Rob Johnson 82'; Tony Williams 84'		15' Lee Tschantret; 45' Don D'Ambra; 81' Jamel Mitchell; 90' Jakob Fenger

University of Richmond Stadium, Richmond, Virginia
Attendance: 1,800

The Hershey Wildcats advance to the Eastern Conference final.

=== Eastern Conference semifinal 2 ===
September 20, 1998
7:30 PM EST

Montreal Impact (QC)	2–2	Rochester Rhinos (NY)
Elvis Thomas (42:29); Patrick Diotte (54:41); Nick De Santis (yellow card) 90'	Report	(15:24) Darren Tilley (20:09), (yellow card) 46' Tommy Tanner; (yellow card) 72' Nate Daligcon; (yellow card) 86' Tim Hardy
Penalties
Giuliano Oliviero (penalty scored); Nevio Pizzolitto (penalty scored); Patrick Diotte (penalty missed); Elvis Thomas (penalty missed); Onandi Lowe (penalty missed)	2–3	(penalty scored) Carlos Zavala; (penalty missed) Doug Miller; (penalty missed) Patrick Diotte; (penalty scored) Scott Schweitzer; (penalty scored) Darren Tilley

Complexe sportif Claude-Robillard, Montreal, Quebec
Attendance: 4,360
September 23, 1998
7:35 PM EST

Rochester Rhinos (NY)	4–1	Montreal Impact (QC)
Tim Hardy (yellow card) 36'; Lenin Steenkamp (44:02); Scott Schweitzer (60:45); Yari Allnutt (67:50); Mike Kirmse (yellow card) 84'	Report	(22:25) Elvis Thomas; (yellow card) 24' John Limniatis; (yellow card) 56' Nevio Pizzolitto; (yellow card) 59' Nick De Santis

Frontier Field, Rochester, New York
Attendance: 7,529

=== Western Conference semifinal 1 ===
September 18, 1998

Minnesota Thunder (MN)	2–1	Seattle Sounders (WA)
Stoian Mladenov 49'; Amos Magee 73'	Report	(yellow card) 2' Dick McCormick; (yellow card) 28' Scott Jenkins; 61' Peter Hattrup

National Sports Center, Blaine, Minnesota
Attendance: 2,084
September 20, 1998
5:00 PM (PDT)

Seattle Sounders (WA)	1–2	Minnesota Thunder (MN)
Dick McCormick (yellow card) 13', (goal) 84'; Jason Annicchero (yellow card) 27'; Scott Jenkins (yellow card) 30'; David Hoggan (yellow card) 66'; Neil Megson (yellow card) 84'	Report	19' Gerard Lagos; (yellow card) 25' Don Gramenz; (yellow card) 62' Morgan Zeba; 73' (pen.) Kevin Anderson

Memorial Stadium, Seattle, Washington
Attendance: 3,579
Referee: Ricardo Valenzuela (USA)

The Minnesota Thunder advanced 4-2 on aggregate.

=== Western Conference semifinal 2 ===
September 19, 1998

San Diego Flash (CA)	2–1	New Orleans Storm (LA)
Antonio Robles 18'; Carlos Farias 73'		60' Glenn Benjamin

Devore Stadium, Chula Vista, California
Attendance: 4,043
September 21, 1998

New Orleans Storm (LA)	3–3	San Diego Flash (CA)
Gabe Gentile 46'; Chris Veselka 61', 89'; Colin Rocke (red card) 63'; Andrew Restrepo (red card) 69'		7' Jerome Watson; 53' Mauricio Alegre; 75' Carlos Farias
Penalties
	2–3

Zephyr Field, Metairie, Louisiana
Attendance: 1,104

The San Diego Flash advance to the Western Conference championship.

== Conference finals ==
=== Eastern Conference ===
September 26, 1998
8:00 PM EST

Rochester Rhinos (NY)	3–1	Hershey Wildcats (PA)
Jimmy Glenn (2:30), (yellow card) 27'; Darren Tilley (60:20); Yari Allnutt (yellow card) 41'	Report	(yellow card) 18' Mike Williams (83:01) Lee Tschantret

Frontier Field, Rochester, New York
Attendance: 8,212
October 3, 1998
7:35 PM EST

Hershey Wildcats (PA)	0–1	Rochester Rhinos (NY)
	Report	(74:16) Darren Tilley

Hersheypark Stadium, Hershey, Pennsylvania
Attendance: 1,847

The Rochester Rhinos advanced to the finals.

=== Western Conference ===
September 26, 1998

Minnesota Thunder (MN)	2–1	San Diego Flash (CA)
John Coughlin 22'; Gabe Garcia 87'	Report	55' Daniel Sinouhi

National Sports Center, Blaine, Minnesota
Attendance: 2,743
September 30, 1998

San Diego Flash (CA)	1–2	Minnesota Thunder (MN)
Jerome Watson 68'	Report	18' Constantin Stănici; 42' Morgan Zeba

Devore Stadium, Chula Vista, California
Attendance: 3,183

The Minnesota Thunder advanced to the final.

== Final ==
October 17, 1998
7:00 PM EST

Rochester Rhinos (NY)	3–1	Minnesota Thunder (MN)
Darren Tilley (19:02); Scott Schweitzer (yellow card) 51'; Tim Hardy (yellow card) 77'	Report	(yellow card) 1' Morgan Zeba (33:09) Tim Hardy

Frontier Field, Rochester, New York
Attendance: 13,772

MVP: Darren Tilley

== Points leaders ==
Rank	Scorer	Club	Goals	Assists	Points
1	(United States) Mark Baena	Seattle Sounders	24	5	53
2	(England) Darren Tilley	Rochester Rhinos	21	6	48
3	(United States) Amos Magee	Minnesota Thunder	15	10	40
4	(United States) Kirk Wilson	El Paso Patriots	15	7	37
5	(Canada) Mauro Biello	Montreal Impact	11	13	35
6	(United States) Mike Burke	Charleston Battery	16	2	34
6	(Trinidad and Tobago) Gary Glasgow	New Orleans Storm	15	4	34
6	(United States) Antonio Robles	San Diego Flash	15	4	34
9	(United States) Yari Allnutt	Rochester Rhinos	14	5	33
10	(United States) Jon Szczepanski	Milwaukee Rampage	8	14	30
10	(United States) Jason Cairns	Cincinnati Riverhawks	8	14	30
12	(Mexico) Luis Labastida	Albuquerque Geckos	9	11	29
12	(England) John Smith	Nashville Metros	9	11	29
14	(Jamaica) Patrick Beech	Seattle Sounders	12	4	28
14	(United States) Steve Patterson	Orange County Zodiac	11	6	28
14	(Netherlands) Martin Reynders	Nashville Metros	11	6	28
17	(Canada) Giuliano Oliviero	Montreal Impact	8	11	27
18	(Canada) Gino DiFlorio	Cincinnati Riverhawks	12	2	26
18	(United States) Jimmy Glenn	Rochester Rhinos	10	6	26

== Honors ==
- MVP: (United States) Mark Baena
- Leading goal scorer: (United States) Mark Baena
- Leading goalkeeper: (Canada) Pat Onstad
- Defender of the Year: (United States) Scott Schweitzer
- Rookie of the Year: (United States) Mike Burke
- Coach of the Year: (Canada) Pat Ercoli
- First Team All League
  - Goalkeeper: (Canada) Pat Onstad
  - Defenders: (United States) Gabe Eastman, (United States) Scott Schweitzer, (Trinidad and Tobago) Craig Demmin
  - Midfielders: (United States) Yari Allnutt, (Canada) Mauro Biello, (United States) John Ball, (United States) Lee Tschantret
  - Forwards: (United States) Mark Baena, (England) Darren Tilley, (United States) Amos Magee
- Second Team All League
  - Goalkeeper: (United States) Joe Cannon
  - Defenders: (Canada) Carl Fletcher, (Canada) Steve MacDonald, (United States) Omid Namazi
  - Midfielders: (United States) Kevin Anderson, (United States) Jason Cairns, (United States) Antonio Robles, (United States) Kirk Wilson
  - Forwards: (Trinidad and Tobago) Gary Glasgow, (United States) Mike Burke, (United States) Josh Wolff
- Organization of the Year: Vancouver 86ers
- Executive of the Year: (United States) Jim Harwood, Milwaukee Rampage
- Fair Play Award: Rochester Raging Rhinos
- Key Grip Award: (England) Matthew Ford, Hershey Wildcats
