= 1998 in Canadian soccer =

Soccer in Canada
- Season: 1998

Men's soccer
- (United States) USISL A-League: Rochester Rhinos (Note: The Montreal Impact were the best Canadian club, reaching the Conference Semifinals of the USISL A-League playoffs.)
- (Canada) CPSL: St. Catharines Wolves
- (United States) PDSL: San Gabriel Valley Highlanders (Note: The Okanagan Valley Challenge were the best Canadian club, reaching the Division Finals of the PDSL playoffs.)
- (Canada) Challenge Trophy: RDP Concordes Quebec
- (Canada) CPSL League Cup: Toronto Olympians

Women's soccer
- Jubilee Trophy: Nepean United

This article is a summary of the 1998 season of competitive soccer in Canada.

== National teams ==
When available, the home team or the team that is designated as the home team is listed in the left column; the away team is in the right column.

Win Draw Loss

=== Men ===
==== Senior ====
===== Friendlies =====
18 May 1998 Friendly	Canada	1–0	Macedonia	Toronto, Canada
15:00 UTC−11:00	Thompson 6'	Report		Stadium: Varsity Stadium; Attendance: 8,491

=== Women ===
==== Senior ====
===== 1998 CONCACAF Women's Championship =====
28 August 1998 Group Stage	Canada	21–0	Puerto Rico	Toronto, Canada
	Burtini 2', 7', 9', 15', 24', 26', 40', 43', Rosenow 12', 69', 70', 80', Franck 18', 62', Hooper 21', 38', Morneau 36', 44', Blaskovic 64', 73', Muir 75'	Report		Stadium: Centennial Park Stadium; Attendance: 2,050

30 August 1998 Group Stage	Canada	14–0	Martinique	Toronto, Canada
	Burtini 3', 13', 26', Hooper 21', Muir 28', Rosenow 30', 38', 44', 55', Morneau 65', Blaskovic 72', 77', Harvey 81', Smith 85'	Report		Stadium: Centennial Park Stadium; Attendance: 2,121

1 September 1998 Group Stage	Canada	4–0	Guatemala	Toronto, Canada
	Hooper 2', Burtini 23', 26', 53'	Report		Stadium: Centennial Park Stadium; Attendance: 2,756

4 September 1998 Semifinal	Canada	2–0	Costa Rica	Toronto, Canada
20:00	Hooper 19', 39'	Report		Stadium: Centennial Park Stadium; Attendance: 2,834

6 September 1998 Final	Canada	1–0	Mexico	Toronto, Canada
20:00	Smith 42'	Report		Stadium: Centennial Park Stadium; Attendance: 4,971

===== Friendlies =====
19 July 1998 Friendly	Canada	1–2	China PR	Ottawa, Canada
	Rosenow 24'	Report	Jin 30'; Liu 50'	Stadium: Keith Harris Stadium

21 July 1998 Friendly	Canada	0–4	China PR	Montreal, Canada
		Report	Sun 30', 38', 52'; Qiu 33'	Stadium: Complexe sportif Claude-Robillard

2 August 1998 Friendly	United States	4–0	Canada	Orlando, United States
	Keller 25', 37'; Milbrett 58'; Foudy 88'	Report		Attendance: 34,416

== Domestic leagues ==
=== Men ===
==== United Systems of Independent Soccer Leagues ====
Three Canadian teams (Montreal Impact, Toronto Lynx, and Vancouver 86ers) played in this league, which also contained twenty eight teams from the United States. It was considered a Division II league the United States soccer league system.

===== Regular season =====
Northeast Division
Pos	Team	Pld	W	SOW	SOL	L	GF	GA	GD	Pts
1	Rochester Rhinos	28	23	1	1	3	72	15	+57	70
2	Montreal Impact	28	13	8	2	5	47	33	+14	47
3	Staten Island Vipers	28	15	1	1	11	46	37	+9	46
4	Long Island Rough Riders	28	14	3	1	10	46	35	+11	45
5	Worcester Wildfire	28	10	2	2	14	37	50	−13	32
6	Toronto Lynx	28	8	1	2	17	27	42	−15	25
7	Connecticut Wolves	28	2	5	3	18	32	57	−25	11

Pacific Division
Pos	Team	Pld	W	SOW	SOL	L	GF	GA	GD	Pts
1	San Diego Flash	28	20	1	1	6	58	23	+35	61
2	Seattle Sounders	28	17	1	0	10	63	28	+35	52
3	Orange County Zodiac	28	15	1	3	9	49	43	+6	46
4	Vancouver 86ers	28	13	2	1	12	55	42	+13	41
5	MLS Project 40	28	10	1	2	15	45	55	−10	31
6	San Francisco Bay Seals	28	9	1	5	13	31	47	−16	28
7	California Jaguars	28	6	0	1	21	32	95	−63	18

===== Playoffs =====
====== Conference Quarterfinals ======
September 12, 1998	Montreal Impact (QC)	3–1	Staten Island Vipers (NY)	Complexe sportif Claude-Robillard, Montreal, Quebec
	Giuliano Oliviero 3'; Kevin Lamey 66'; Kevin Wilson 90'		2' Marvin Oliver	Attendance: 9,673

September 12, 1998; 7:30 PM (PDT)	San Diego Flash (CA)	3–1	Vancouver 86ers (BC)	Devore Stadium, Chula Vista, California
	Nate Hetherington 22', 74'; Jamie Munro (red card) 41'; Carlos Farias 51'; Jerome Watson 90'	Report	19' Jason Jordan	Attendance: 4,178

====== Conference Semifinals ======
September 20, 1998; 7:30 PM EST Leg 1	Montreal Impact (QC)	2–2 (2–3 p)	Rochester Rhinos (NY)	Complexe sportif Claude-Robillard, Montreal, Quebec
	Elvis Thomas (42:29); Patrick Diotte (54:41); Nick De Santis (yellow card) 90'	Report	(15:24) Darren Tilley (20:09), (yellow card) 46' Tommy Tanner; (yellow card) 72' Nate Daligcon; (yellow card) 86' Tim Hardy	Attendance: 4,360
	Penalties
	Giuliano Oliviero (penalty scored); Nevio Pizzolitto (penalty scored); Patrick Diotte (penalty missed); Elvis Thomas (penalty missed); Onandi Lowe (penalty missed)		(penalty scored) Carlos Zavala; (penalty missed) Doug Miller; (penalty missed) Patrick Diotte; (penalty scored) Scott Schweitzer; (penalty scored) Darren Tilley

September 23, 1998; 7:35 PM EST Leg 2	Rochester Rhinos (NY)	4–1	Montreal Impact (QC)	Frontier Field, Rochester, New York
	Tim Hardy (yellow card) 36'; Lenin Steenkamp (44:02); Scott Schweitzer (60:45); Yari Allnutt (67:50); Mike Kirmse (yellow card) 84'	Report	(22:25) Elvis Thomas; (yellow card) 24' John Limniatis; (yellow card) 56' Nevio Pizzolitto; (yellow card) 59' Nick De Santis	Attendance: 7,529

==== Canadian Professional Soccer League ====
Eight teams played in this league, all of which were based in Canada. It was considered a Division 3 league in the Canadian soccer league system.

Pos	Team	Pld	W	D	L	GF	GA	GD	Pts	Qualification
1	Toronto Olympians (C)	14	13	1	0	73	6	+67	40	Playoffs
2	St. Catharines Wolves (O)	14	8	3	3	31	26	+5	27	Playoffs
3	Glen Shields	14	6	3	5	26	27	−1	21	Playoffs
4	North York Astros	14	6	1	7	34	30	+4	19	Playoffs
5	York Region Shooters	14	5	2	7	30	44	−14	17	
6	London City	14	4	3	7	27	42	−15	15	
7	Mississauga Eagles P.S.C.	14	3	1	10	29	44	−15	10	
8	Toronto Croatia	14	2	4	8	20	51	−31	10	

Updated to match(es) played on September 30, 1998. Source: rocketrobinsoccerintoronto.com
Rules for classification: 1) points; 2) goal difference; 3) number of goals scored.
(C) Champions; (O) Play-off winners

==== Premier Development Soccer League ====
Three Canadian teams (Abbotsford Athletes In Action, Okanagan Valley Challenge, and Victoria Umbro Select) played in this league, which also contained 33 teams from the United States. It is considered a Division 4 league in the Canadian soccer league system.

Northwest Division
Pos	Team	Pld	W	PKW	PKL	L	GF	GA	GD	Pts
1	Spokane Shadow	16	13	0	0	3	62	15	+47	39
2	Yakima Reds	16	9	0	0	7	40	28	+12	27
3	Seattle BigFoot	16	8	3	0	5	28	32	−4	27 (Note: Seattle BigFoot was penalized 3 points.)
4	Cascade Surge	16	7	2	2	5	28	28	0	23 (Note: Cascade was penalized 2 points.)
5	Seattle Hibernian (Note: Abbotsford, Okanagan Valley, Seattle Hibernian, and Victoria are all associate members and do not play a full schedule.)	8	2	0	1	5	5	16	−11	6
6	Okanagan Valley Challenge	8	2	0	1	5	6	23	−17	6
7	Victoria Umbro Select	8	1	0	2	5	11	19	−8	3
8	Abbotsford Athletes In Action	8	0	1	0	7	9	28	−19	1 (Note: Abbotsford was penalized 1 point.)

Source: RSSSF

== Domestic cups ==
=== Men ===
==== CPSL League Cup ====
September 16, 1998	St. Catharines Roma Wolves	0–0	Toronto Olympians	St. Catharines, Ontario
20:15 pm		Report		Stadium: Club Roma Stadium; Referee: Gord Arrowsmith

September 27, 1998	Toronto Olympians	3–0	St. Catharines Roma Wolves	Toronto, Ontario
20:00 pm	Gus Kouzmanis 44', 66'; Berdusco 63'	Report		Stadium: Birchmount Stadium; Attendance: 300; Referee: Frank Marciello

Toronto Olympians wins 3–0 on aggregate.

==== Challenge Trophy ====
The Challenge Trophy is a national cup contested by men's teams at the division 4 level and below.

October 10, 1998	RDP Concordes Quebec	1–0	(Ontario) Hamilton Serbians	Fredericton, New Brunswick
