= 1999 U.S. Open Cup =

Soccer tournament season

1999 Lamar Hunt U.S. Open Cup
Tournament details
- Country: United States

Final positions
- Champions: Rochester Raging Rhinos (1st title)
- Runners-up: Colorado Rapids

Tournament statistics
- Top goal scorer(s): Mugurel Dumitru (6 goals)

The 1999 Lamar Hunt U.S. Open Cup ran from June to October 1999, open to all soccer teams in the United States. It was the first Open Cup tournament to be named after Lamar Hunt. The Rochester Raging Rhinos of the A-League defeated the Colorado Rapids 2–0 in the final at Columbus Crew Stadium in Columbus, Ohio. The Rhinos became the first, and as of 2026, only non-Division I team to win the Open Cup since the inception of Major League Soccer, defeating four MLS teams in the tournament. Another A-League team, the Charleston Battery, also reached the semifinals, and the A-League's Staten Island Vipers were the other non-division one squad to beat an MLS team.

== Bracket ==
Home teams listed on top of bracket

Second Round
A-L	Charleston Battery	2
D3	Wilmington Hammerheads	1
A-L	Staten Island Vipers	7
USASA	United German-Hungarians	0
A-L	Minnesota Thunder	1
PDL	Mid-Michigan Bucks	2
A-L	Seattle Sounders	3
PDL	Spokane Shadow	1
PDL	Cocoa Expos	2
A-L	Jacksonville Cyclones	7
A-L	Rochester Rhinos (ASDET)	2
PDL	New York Freedom	1
A-L	San Diego Flash	7
D3	Arizona Sahuaros	2
A-L	Orange County Zodiac	0
D3	Carolina Dynamo	2

Third Round
A-L	Charleston Battery	4
MLS	D.C. United (ASDET)	3
MLS	MetroStars (ASDET)	2
A-L	Staten Island Vipers	3
PDL	Mid-Michigan Bucks	1
MLS	Tampa Bay Mutiny	2
MLS	Colorado Rapids	1
A-L	Seattle Sounders	0
MLS	Dallas Burn	3
A-L	Jacksonville Cyclones	0
A-L	Rochester Rhinos	1
MLS	Chicago Fire	0
A-L	San Diego Flash	2
MLS	Los Angeles Galaxy	3
MLS	Columbus Crew	3
PDL	Carolina Dynamo	0

Quarterfinals
A-L	Charleston Battery	2
A-L	Staten Island Vipers	1
MLS	Tampa Bay Mutiny	0
MLS	Colorado Rapids	1
A-L	Rochester Rhinos	2
MLS	Dallas Burn (ASDET)	1
MLS	Los Angeles Galaxy	1
MLS	Columbus Crew	3

Semifinals
A-L	Charleston Battery	0
MLS	Colorado Rapids	3
A-L	Rochester Rhinos	3
MLS	Columbus Crew	2

Finals
MLS	Colorado Rapids	0
A-L	Rochester Rhinos	2

== Schedule ==
Note: Scorelines use the standard U.S. convention of placing the home team on the right-hand side of box scores.

=== First round ===
Eight D3 Pro, four PDL, and four USASA teams start.

June 5, 1999	Los Lobos (USASA)	1–8	Wilmington Hammerheads (D3 Pro)	Wilmington, North Carolina
	Fernandez 76'	(Report)	Brian Hunter 21', 52'; Ryan Walker 32', 34', 39'; Luke Griffith 55', 72', 88'	Stadium: Legion Stadium; Attendance: 1,132; Referee: Jon Wilson (USA)

June 8, 1999	Austin Lone Stars (D3 Pro)	2–3	Mid Michigan Bucks (PDL)	Saginaw Township, Michigan
	Marc Madeley 14'; Gabe Jones 48'	(Report)	Tino Scicluna 37'; Benji Djeukeng 50'; Paul Snape 88'	Stadium: White Pine Stadium; Attendance: 325; Referee: Carlos Folino (USA)

June 9, 1999	United German-Hungarians (USASA)	2–1	New Jersey Stallions (D3 Pro)	Toms River, New Jersey
	Ray De Stephanis 31'; Robert Henes 48'	(Report)	Júlio Santos 24'	Stadium: Toms River HS North; Attendance: 60; Referee: Ruben Rodhas (USA)

June 9, 1999	New York Freedom (PDL)	3–1	Cape Cod Crusaders (D3 Pro)	South Yarmouth, Massachusetts
	Aboucar Camara 24', 49'; Moussa Sy 77'	(Report)	Nicholas Bone 58'	Stadium: Alan Carson Field; Attendance: 60; Referee: Delfim Rainho (USA)

June 10, 1999	Cocoa Expos (PDL)	5–3	Northern Virginia Royals (D3 Pro)	Washington, D.C.
	Dillon 3'; Steven Butcher 29', 31'; Eddie Enders 38'; Hinkey 57'	(Report)	Tim Prisco 45'; Alberto Ogando 68'; Richard Englefried 78'	Stadium: RFK Stadium; Attendance: 150; Referee: Bill Dittmar (USA)

June 11, 1999	Mexico SC (USASA)	2–3 (asdet)	Arizona Sahuaros (D3 Pro)	Peoria, Arizona
	Dillon 9'; Delgadillo 72'	(Report)	Alex Pogman 60'; Harold Calvo 85', 102'	Stadium: Peoria Sports Complex; Attendance: 1,500; Referee: Richard Heron (USA)

June 16, 1999	Spokane Shadow (PDL)	3–2 (asdet)	Chico Rooks (D3 Pro)	Chico, California
	Jeff Rose 39'; Dave Berto 73' (PK); Cosner 108'	(Report)	Luis Orellana 19'; Joe Munoz 63'	Stadium: University Stadium; Attendance: 450; Referee: Javier Padilla (USA)

June 20, 1999	Bavarian Leinenkugel (USASA)	0–1	Carolina Dynamo (D3 Pro)	High Point, North Carolina
		(Report)	Jason Haupt 86'	Stadium: High Point Athletic Complex; Attendance: -- Referee: Abbas Piran (USA)

=== Second round ===
Eight A-League teams enter.

June 23, 1999	United German-Hungarians (USASA)	0–7	Staten Island Vipers (A-League)	Staten Island, New York
		(Report)	Marvin Oliver 3'; Ernest Inneh 4', 74'; Dahir Mohammed 30'; Rob Johnson 55'; Kevin Wilson 89', 90'	Stadium: Bruce Hansen Memorial Field; Attendance: 363; Referee: John Konstantinidis (USA)

June 23, 1999	Mid Michigan Bucks (PDL)	2–1	Minnesota Thunder (A-League)	Blaine, Minnesota
	Dodd 23'; Chad Schomaker 28'	(Report)	Kalin Bankov 80'	Stadium: National Sports Center; Attendance: 225; Referee: Siavosh Rahimi (USA)

June 23, 1999	Spokane Shadow (PDL)	1–3	Seattle Sounders (A-League)	Seattle, Washington
	Jeff Rose 79'	(Report)	Erik Storkson 28', 56'; Peter Hattrup 74'	Stadium: Memorial Stadium; Attendance: 236; Referee: Mohammed Zarrabi-Kashani (USA)

June 30, 1999	New York Freedom (PDL)	1–2 (asdet)	Rochester Raging Rhinos (A-League)	Rochester, New York
	Rodney Rambo 57'	(Report)	Mauro Biello 62'; Darren Tilley 109'	Stadium: Frontier Field; Attendance: 7,131; Referee: Vladimir Fabre (USA)

June 30, 1999	Arizona Sahuaros (D3 Pro)	2–9	San Diego Flash (A-League)	San Diego, California
	Harold Calvo 30'; Joe Owen 49'	(Report)	Mugurel Dimitru 9', 45', 56', 57', 87', 90'; Antonio Robles 17'; Carlos Farias 41', 75'	Stadium: Douglas Stadium; Attendance: 812; Referee: Emiliano Monje (USA)

July 6, 1999	Wilmington Hammerheads (D3 Pro)	1–2	Charleston Battery (A-League)	Charleston, South Carolina
	Charles Panos 90'	(Report)	Todd Miller 3'; Paul Conway 16'	Stadium: Blackbaud Stadium; Attendance: 2,102; Referee: Thomas Perry (USA)

July 6, 1999	Carolina Dynamo (D3 Pro)	2–0	Orange County Zodiac (A-League)	Santa Ana, California
	Maher Atta 17'; Jose Espindola 48'	(Report)		Stadium: Santa Ana Bowl; Attendance: 200; Referee: -- (USA)

July 10, 1999	Jacksonville Cyclones (A-League)	7–2	Cocoa Expos (PDL)	Cocoa, Florida
	Jorge Munoz 5' (PK), 20', 36', 54'; Jose DeOlivera 45', 79'; Brad Schmidt 80'	(Report)	Derek Phillips 27', 49' (PK)	Stadium: Cocoa Expo Sports Center; Attendance: 1,112; Referee: Reggie Rutty (USA)

=== Third round ===
Eight MLS teams enter.

July 12, 1999	Tampa Bay Mutiny (MLS)	2–1	Mid Michigan Bucks (PDL)	Saginaw Township, Michigan
	Musa Shannon 2', 70'	(Report)	Stephen Armstrong 74'	Stadium: White Pine Stadium; Attendance: 4,887; Referee: Zekai Akbay (USA)

July 13, 1999	Staten Island Vipers (A-League)	3–2 (asdet)	MetroStars (MLS)	Piscataway, New Jersey
	Ernest Inneh 32'; Lee Tschantret 85'; Kevin Wilson 95'	(Report)	Billy Walsh 69', 81'	Stadium: Rutgers University; Attendance: 1,077; Referee: Gerry Corrie (USA)

July 13, 1999	Carolina Dynamo (D3 Pro)	0–3	Columbus Crew (MLS)	Columbus, Ohio
		(Report)	Ansil Elcock 36'; Stern John 47', 84'	Stadium: Crew Stadium; Attendance: 11,257; Referee: Francisco Gomez (USA)

July 13, 1999	Jacksonville Cyclones (A-League)	0–3	Dallas Burn (MLS)	Duncanville, Texas
		(Report)	Bobby Rhine 17', 35', 43'	Stadium: Old Panther Field; Attendance: 347; Referee: Misail Tsapas (USA)

July 13, 1999	Seattle Sounders (A-League)	0–1	Colorado Rapids (MLS)	Denver, Colorado
		(Report)	Matt McKeon 26'	Stadium: Mile High Stadium; Attendance: 20,376; Referee: Richard Heron (USA)

July 14, 1999	Chicago Fire (MLS)	0–1	Rochester Raging Rhinos (A-League)	Rochester, New York
		(Report)	Yari Allnutt 51'	Stadium: Frontier Field; Attendance: 10,107; Referee: Ruben Rodhas (USA)

July 20, 1999	Los Angeles Galaxy (MLS)	3–2	San Diego Flash (A-League)	San Diego, California
	Clint Mathis 53', 85'; Danny Pena 61'	(Report)	Antonio Robles 20'; Carlos Farias 25'	Stadium: Douglas Stadium; Attendance: 5,647; Referee: Bryan Elliott (USA)

August 4, 1999	D.C. United (MLS)	3–4 (asdet)	Charleston Battery (A-League)	Charleston, South Carolina
	Jaime Moreno 28'; Chris Albright 59'; A.J. Wood 84'	(Report)	Michael Burke 12'; Dean Sewell 24'; Ivailo Ilarionov 87', 100'	Stadium: Blackbaud Stadium; Attendance: 5,456; Referee: Kermit Quisenberry (USA)

=== Quarterfinals ===
August 11, 1999	Dallas Burn (MLS)	1–2 (asdet)	Rochester Raging Rhinos (A-League)	Rochester, New York
	Jason Kreis 85'	(Report)	Mauro Biello 71'; Michael Kirmse 110'	Stadium: Frontier Field; Attendance: 10,730; Referee: Alberto Giordano (USA)

August 11, 1999	Columbus Crew (MLS)	3–1	Los Angeles Galaxy (MLS)	Fullerton, California
	Brian McBride 4', 88'; Jason Farrell 65'	(Report)	Greg Vanney 37'	Stadium: Titan Stadium; Attendance: 5,478; Referee: Kevin Stott (USA)

August 13, 1999	Colorado Rapids (MLS)	1–0	Tampa Bay Mutiny (MLS)	Tampa, Florida
	Jorge Dely Valdés 90'	(Report)		Stadium: Raymond James Stadium; Attendance: 9,651; Referee: Andrew Barnes (USA)
Note: This game doubled as an MLS regular season match.

August 18, 1999	Staten Island Vipers (A-League)	1–2	Charleston Battery (A-League)	Charleston, South Carolina
	Kevin Wilson 90'	(Report)	Paul Conway 4' (PK); Paul Conway 12'	Stadium: Blackbaud Stadium; Attendance: 2,665; Referee: Jon Wilson (USA)

=== Semifinals ===
September 1, 1999	Columbus Crew (MLS)	2–3	Rochester Raging Rhinos (A-League)	Virginia Beach, Virginia
	Robert Warzycha 56'; Brian West 77'	(Report)	Darren Tilley 68'; Scott Schweitzer 86'; Tim Hardy 90'	Stadium: Virginia Beach Sportsplex; Attendance: 2,109; Referee: Noel Kenny (USA)

September 1, 1999	Colorado Rapids (MLS)	3–0	Charleston Battery (A-League)	Virginia Beach, Virginia
	Jorge Dely Valdés 55', 87'; Paul Bravo 82'	(Report)		Stadium: Virginia Beach Sportsplex; Attendance: 2,109; Referee: Andrew Barnes (USA)

=== Final ===
September 14, 1999

Rochester Raging Rhinos (A-League)	2–0	Colorado Rapids (MLS)
Miller 65'; Allnutt 90'	(Report)

Crew Stadium
Columbus, Ohio
Attendance: 4,555
Referee: Tim Weyland (USA)

Rochester Raging Rhinos
Colorado Rapids

GK	(Canada) Pat Onstad
DF	(United States) Andrew Restrepo
DF	(Trinidad and Tobago) Craig Demmin	(substituted off) 51'
DF	(United States) Scott Schweitzer
DF	(United States) Tim Hardy
MF	(United States) Bill Sedgewick
MF	(United States) Nate Dalgicon	(substituted off) 83'
MF	(United States) Mali Walton
MF	(United States) Yari Allnut
FW	(Canada) Mauro Biello
FW	(England) Darren Tilley	(substituted off) 62'
Substitutes:
DF	(United States) Mike Kirmse	(substituted on) 51'
MF	(United States) Doug Miller	(substituted on) 62'
FW	(Mexico) Carlos Zavala	(substituted on) 83'
Head Coach:
(Canada) Pat Ercoli

GK	(United States) Ian Feuer
DF	(United States) David Vaudreuil
DF	(United States) Marcelo Balboa
DF	(United States) Peter Vermes
DF	(United States) Tim Martin	(substituted off) 81'
MF	(United States) Kevin Anderson	(substituted off) 58'
MF	(United States) Matt McKeon
MF	(United States) Ross Paule
MF	(United States) Darren Sawatzky	(substituted off) 76'
FW	(Panama) Jorge Dely Valdes
FW	(United States) Paul Bravo
Substitutes:
DF	(United States) Joey DiGiamarino	(substituted on) 58'
MF	(Canada) Jason Bent	(substituted on) 76'
DF	(Jamaica) Wolde Harris	(substituted on) 81'
Head Coach:
(United States) Glenn Myernick

== Top scorers ==
Position	Player	Club	Goals
1	Mugurel Dumitru	San Diego Flash	6
2	Jorge Munoz	Jacksonville Cyclones	4
2	Kevin Wilson	Staten Island Vipers	4
2	Brian Hunter	Wilmington Hammerheads	4

== See also ==
- United States Soccer Federation
- Lamar Hunt U.S. Open Cup
- Major League Soccer
- United Soccer Leagues
- USASA
- National Premier Soccer League
- 1999 National Amateur Cup
