= 1987 NCAA Division I men's lacrosse tournament =

- Teams: 12
- Finals site: Rutgers Stadium, Piscataway, New Jersey
- Champions: Johns Hopkins (7th title)
- Runner-up: Cornell (5th title game)
- Semifinalists: Maryland (11th Final Four); Syracuse (6th Final Four)
- Winning coach: Don Zimmerman (3rd title)
- MOP: Tim Goldstein, Cornell
- Attendance: 17,077 finals 49,782 total
- Top scorer: Tim Goldstein, Cornell (25 goals)

The 1987 NCAA Division I lacrosse tournament was the 17th annual tournament hosted by the National Collegiate Athletic Association to determine the team champion of men's college lacrosse among its Division I programs, held at the end of the 1987 NCAA Division I men's lacrosse season.

Johns Hopkins defeated Cornell in the championship game, 11–10. This was the seventh NCAA championship for Hopkins since tournament play began in 1971–and third in four years–and was also their twelfth appearance out of sixteen title matches.

The championship game was played at Rutgers Stadium at Rutgers University in Piscataway, New Jersey, with 16,901 fans in attendance.

== Overview ==
Twelve NCAA Division I college men's lacrosse teams met after having played their way through a regular season, and for some, a conference tournament.

Craig Bubier scored with 1:51 left in the game gave Johns Hopkins the final with the goal coming off a fast break after Quint Kessenich intercepted a long clear by the Cornell goalie. Kessenich had 21 saves for Hopkins. Hopkins was sparked on defense by goalkeeper Kessenich and Dave Pietramala, while National Hall of Fame member attackman Tim Goldstein tallied two goals and added six assists for Cornell.

Cornell had defeated a Syracuse team in the semifinals, 18–15, in a game which featured Paul and Gary Gait. Adelphi upset #7 Army 6-5 in the first round.

== Bracket ==
First Round
8	Penn	11
Massachusetts	10
5	North Carolina	21
Michigan State	5
6	Navy	14
Brown	6
7	Army	5
Adelphi	6

Quarterfinals
1	Maryland	12
8	Penn	8
4	Johns Hopkins	11
5	North Carolina	10
3	Syracuse	19
6	Navy	5
2	Cornell	14
Adelphi	12

Semifinals; May 23
1	Maryland	8
4	Johns Hopkins	13
3	Syracuse	15
2	Cornell	18

Final; May 25
4	Johns Hopkins	11
2	Cornell	10

== Box scores ==
=== Finals ===
Team	1	2	3	4	Total
Johns Hopkins	3	4	2	2	11
Cornell	2	2	5	1	10
Johns Hopkins scoring – Craig Bubier 4, Brian Wood 2, John Dressel, Mike Morrill, John Ciccarone, Larry LeDoyen, John Wilkens; Cornell scoring – Tim Goldstein 2, Mike Cummings 2, Bob Cummings 2, John Wurzburger 2, Tim Mulligan, Vince Angotti; Shots: Cornell 43, Johns Hopkins 37; Saves: Johns Hopkins 21, Cornell 15

=== Semifinals ===
Team	1	2	3	4	Total
Johns Hopkins	4	3	2	4	13
Maryland	2	2	3	1	8
Johns Hopkins scoring – Brian Wood 5, Mike Morrill 3, Brendan Kelly 2, John Dressel, John Wilkens, Craig Bubier; Maryland scoring – Brian Willard 3, Mike Smith 2, Mike Mosko 2, Guy Riccardi; Shots: Johns Hopkins 39, Maryland 30; Saves: Johns Hopkins 10, Maryland 10

Team	1	2	3	4	Total
Cornell	4	5	4	5	18
Syracuse	3	5	4	3	15
Cornell scoring – John Wurzburger 5, Vince Angotti 3, Bob Cummings 2, Tim Goldstein 2, Tim Mulligan, Joe Lizzio, Charlie Caliendo, Bill O’Hanlon, Steve Meyer, Paul Kuehner; Syracuse scoring – Gary Gait 5, Tom Nelson 3, John Zulberti 2, Todd Curry 2, Gordie Mapes, Rhett Cavanaugh, Greg Burns; Shots: Cornell 39, Syracuse 34; Saves: Cornell 13, Syracuse 9

=== Quarterfinals ===
Team	1	2	3	4	Total
Maryland	1	4	3	4	12
Pennsylvania	3	2	2	1	8
Maryland scoring – Brendan Hanley 4, Tom Worstell 3, Kirk Thurston 2, Phil Willard 2, Mike Smith; Pennsylvania scoring – Sean Dougherty 3, Stewart Fisher 3, Chris Flynn, Kevin Nicklas; Shots: Pennsylvania 44, Maryland 36; Saves: Pennsylvania 13, Maryland 11

Team	1	2	3	4	Total
Johns Hopkins	5	2	2	2	11
North Carolina	3	1	3	3	10
Johns Hopkins scoring – Mike Morrill 6, Brendan Kelly, Larry LeDoyen, John Ciccarone, Brian Wood, John Dressel; North Carolina scoring – Joey Seivold 3, Rich Crawford 2, Brett Davy 2, Kevin Haus, Steve Huff, Gary Seivold; Shots: North Carolina 42, Johns Hopkins 30; Saves: Johns Hopkins 21, North Carolina 8

Team	1	2	3	4	Total
Syracuse	5	4	4	6	19
Navy	0	3	1	1	5
Syracuse scoring – Gary Gait 6, Tom Nelson 5, Gordie Mapes 3, John Zulberti 2, Todd Curry, Jim Egan, Rhett Cavanaugh; Navy scoring – Paul Basile, Michael Herger, Tim O’Rourke, Max Grant, Robert Wehman; Shots: Syracuse 59, Navy 36; Saves: Navy 22, Syracuse 18

Team	1	2	3	4	Total
Cornell	2	3	4	5	14
Adelphi	4	5	1	2	12
Cornell scoring – Tim Goldstein 5, Steve Meyer 2, Todd Francis, Mike Cummings, Bob Cummings, Paul Kuehner, Tim McDevitt, John Wurzburger, Joe Lizzio; Adelphi scoring – Gordon Purdie 4, Gary Blohm 3, Scott Reh 2, Barry Greenberg, Sean Keenan, Jeff Reh; Shots: Cornell 51, Adelphi 44; Saves: Adelphi 19, Cornell 18

=== First round ===
Team	1	2	3	4	Total
Pennsylvania	1	4	3	4	11
Massachusetts	3	2	2	1	10
Pennsylvania scoring – John Shoemaker 3, Chris Flynn 3, Stewart Fisher 2, Ted Nyman, Peter Smith, Kevin Nicklas; Massachusetts scoring – Scott Hiller 6, Greg Collins 2, Doug Musco, Kelly Carr; Shots: Pennsylvania 42, Massachusetts 30; Saves: Massachusetts 23, Pennsylvania 9

Team	1	2	3	4	Total
North Carolina	1	4	3	4	21
Michigan State	1	0	2	2	5
North Carolina scoring – Mark Tummillo 3, Corey Gavitt 3, Joey Seivold 2, Scott Cox 2, John Szczypinski 2, Chris Hein 2, David Kelly 2, Pat Welsh, Tim Welsh, Gary Seivold, Ted Brown, Craig O’Callaghan; Michigan St. scoring – John Giampetroni 2, Jim Gallina 2, Dan Crist; Shots: North Carolina 70, Michigan State 24; Saves: Michigan State 25, North Carolina 12

Team	1	2	3	4	Total
Navy	3	5	2	4	14
Brown	2	2	0	2	6
Navy scoring – Michael Herger 6, Bob Wehman 3, Rich Schwarz 2, Brian Sullivan, Frank Snyder, Brian Keith; Brown scoring – Bernie Buonanno 2, Tom Towers 2, Chris Esemplare, Jamie Munro; Shots: Brown 50, Navy 43; Saves: Navy 28, Brown 9

Team	1	2	3	4	Total
Adelphi	3	1	2	0	6
Army	1	2	2	0	5
Adelphi scoring – Scott Reh 2, Gordon Purdie, Gary Blohm, Brian Duncan, Sean Keenan; Army scoring – Bernie Buonanno 2, Tom Towers 2, Chris Esemplare, Jamie Munro; Shots: Adelphi 36, Army 31; Saves: Army 15, Adelphi 11

== All-Tournament Team ==
- Tim Goldstein, Cornell (Named the tournament's Most Outstanding Player)
- Brian Wood, Johns Hopkins
- Craig Bubier, Johns Hopkins
- Gary Gait, Syracuse
- Bob Cummings, Cornell
- Vince Angotti, Cornell
- Aaron Jones, Cornell
- Dave Pietramala, Johns Hopkins
- Steve Mitchell, Johns Hopkins
- Quint Kessenich, Johns Hopkins

== See also ==
- 1987 NCAA Division I women's lacrosse tournament
- 1987 NCAA Division III men's lacrosse tournament
