= Riverside County Elite =

- Nickname: The Elite
- Founded: 1998
- Dissolved: 2000
- Ground: West Valley High School; Hemet, California
- Capacity: 5,000
- Owner: (United States) Jack Fielding
- Head Coach: (United States) Rob Manriquez
- League: USISL D-3 Pro League

Riverside County Elite were an American soccer team established in 1998 that spent the 2000 season in the USISL D-3 Pro League.

== History ==
In 1998, Jack Fielding founded the Riverside County Elite as a U-21 team with the intention of eventually entering it into the USISL. He and his wife created the Riverside Soccer Development Corporation and entered into a partnership with the San Diego Soccer Development Corporation which operated the San Diego Flash. Fielding initially owned, operated and coached the team. In late 1999, Jan K. Skwara became the club CEO. In January 2000, the team hired Tom Evans as head coach. On April 16, 2000, the team replaced Evans with Rob Manriquez. In May 2000, it qualified for the U.S. Open Cup. The team played its home games at West Valley High School in Hemet, California. Although successful on the field, the team never drew many fans and finished the season deeply in debt. Owner Jack Fielding folded the club in December 2000.

- Tim Gorman

MF:

- Pompeyo Aguillera
- Jeremy Baker
- Omar Arzo
- Jauquin Cubarubias
- (United States) Sergio Cuevas
- (Mexico) Oscar Romo
- Juan Carlos Rocha
- Alex Gutierrez
- Cesar Garcia
- (United States) Danny Christ #17

DF

- (Scotland) Neil Armour
- Alex Glebou
- (United States) Danny Macedo
- (United States) Joe Owen
- (United States) Craig Dean #4
- Cody Freas
- (United States) Ryan Meinhart

FW

- (Jamaica) Donald Laing
- Brad Thomson
- (Argentina) Mauricio Bertello
- Antonio Robles
- (United States) Danny Mann
- William Cummins
- (United States) Bryan Hill

=== Staff ===
- Cle Kooiman: Director of coaching
- Tom Evans: Head coach
- Rob Manriquez: Head coach
- Pompeyo Aguillera: Assistant coach
- Neil Armour: Assistant coach
- Mike Christ: Assistant coach

== Year-by-year ==
| Year | Division | League | Reg. season | Playoffs | Open Cup |
|---|---|---|---|---|---|
| 2000 | 3 | USL D-3 Pro League | 5th, Western | Did not qualify | 2nd Round |
