= Mugur =

Mugur ("bud") and its diminutive Mugurel are Romanian given names. Notable persons with these names include:

- Mugur Bolohan (born 1976), Romanian footballer
- Mugur Gușatu (born 1969), Romanian footballer
- Mugur Isărescu (born 1949), Romanian economist and politician
- Mugur Mihăescu (born 1967), Romanian actor and politician
- Mugurel Buga (born 1977), Romanian footballer
- Mugurel Dedu (born 1985), Romanian footballer
- Mugurel Dumitru (born 1972), Romanian footballer
