= Neil Armour =

Scottish footballer

Personal information
- Date of birth: 14 January 1967 (age 59)
- Place of birth: Irvine, Scotland
- Position: Defender

Senior career*
Years	Team	Apps	(Gls)
1985–1987	Greenock Morton	0	(0)
1987–1989	Stranraer	29	(0)
1989–1992	Kilbirnie Ladeside		
1992–1993	Albion Rovers	12	(0)
1994	Guangzhou Apollo	0	(0)
1994–1996	Happy Valley		
1996–1997	Eastern AA		
1997–1999	Yee Hope	?	(6)
2000	Riverside County Elite	8	(0)
2000	Utah Blitzz	18	(0)

Managerial career
- 2000: Riverside County Elite (assistant)
- * Club domestic league appearances and goals

Neil Armour (born 14 January 1967) is a Scottish former footballer. He played in defence for clubs in Scotland, China, Hong Kong and the United States.

== Player ==
In April 2000, Armour had unsuccessful trials with the Hershey Wildcats and Lehigh Valley Steam of the second division USL A-League. He then moved west to sign with the third division Riverside County Elite as a player-assistant coach. The Elite played in the USL D-3 Pro League. On 24 June 2000, he transferred to the Utah Blitzz.

== Coach ==
He has coached at Yee Hope, Riverside County Elite and the Utah Blitzz. Since retirement he has been coaching the junior sides of Orange County Surf Soccer Club in America. Armour currently coaches the OC Surf boys under 14 team, OC Surf girls under 13 team, and the OC Surf girls under 15 team.
