= Jimmy Glenn =

American soccer player (born 1972)

Personal information
- Full name: James Glenn
- Date of birth: August 9, 1972 (age 54)
- Place of birth: Monterey, California, U.S.
- Height: 5 ft 11 in (1.80 m)
- Position: Forward

College career
Years	Team	Apps	(Gls)
1990–1993	Clemson Tigers		

Senior career*
Years	Team	Apps	(Gls)
1994–1995	Greensboro Dynamo	32	(18)
1995–1996	Cincinnati Silverbacks (indoor)	38	(17)
1996	Dallas Burn	9	(0)
1996	Cincinnati Silverbacks (indoor)	2	(1)
1996–1997	Baltimore Spirit (indoor)	30	(18)
1997–2001	Rochester Rhinos	85	(35)
1998	→ Columbus Crew (loan)	5	(0)
1997–1998	Buffalo Blizzard (indoor)	25	(16)
2000–2001	Toronto Thunderhawks (indoor)	32	(24)
2001	Atlanta Silverbacks	3	(0)
Total		261	(129)
- * Club domestic league appearances and goals

Jimmy Glenn (born August 9, 1972) is an American retired soccer forward who played two seasons in Major League Soccer as well as in the National Professional Soccer League, USISL and USL A-League.

== Youth ==
Glenn attended William H. Taft High School, graduating in 1990. During high school, he alternated playing between the '72 Attackers and the Taft Raiders. He then attended Clemson University, where he played on the men's soccer team from 1990 to 1993. He was a 1990 second-team All-American and a 1993 first-team All-American in which he tied the single-season record for goals scored (32). He finished his career ranked second in goals, with 68, and points, with 164.

== Professional ==
In 1994, Glenn signed with the Greensboro Dynamo in the USISL, playing the 1994 and 1995 seasons with them. The Dynamo won the USISL championship in 1994. In the fall of 1995, he signed with the Cincinnati Silverbacks of the National Professional Soccer League (NPSL). On February 7, 1996, the Dallas Burn selected Glenn in the 13th round (123rd overall) in the 1996 MLS Inaugural Player Draft. He played nine games before being released. He rejoined the Silvebacks that fall, playing two games before getting traded to the Baltimore Spirit for the remainder of the 1996–1997 season. In April 1997, he signed with the Rochester Rhinos of the USL A-League. He would remain with the Rhinos until May 2001. During that time, he won the 1998 and 2000 league championships and the 1999 Lamar Hunt U.S. Open Cup. In the Open Cup, the Rhinos defeated the Colorado Rapids, becoming the only USL team to defeat an MLS team in an Open Cup final. Glenn continued to bounce between the summer outdoor and winter indoor leagues when he joined the Buffalo Blizzard for the 1997-1998 NPSL season. He also briefly returned to Major League Soccer when the Rhinos loaned Glenn to the Columbus Crew on May 13, 1998. He played five games with the Crew before returning to the Rhinos. Glenn finished his career with the Toronto Thunderhawks in the 2000-2001 NPSL season. Glenn had intended to continue playing for the Rhinos, but had contract disagreements with them and left the team in May 2001. In June, he signed with the Atlanta Silverbacks where he finished his career.

== Post-playing career ==
After leaving the Rhinos, Glenn moved to Dallas, Texas where he has held a series of jobs in the automotive career field. In October 2001, he joined El Dorado Chrysler/Jeep before moving to Massey Cadillac in January 2003. In July 2003, he was hired by D&M Leasing and in August 2007, he moved to Autoflex Leasing. In May 2008, he was the Internet Sales Manager at Brown Motor Company.
