= Mike Kirmse =

American soccer player (born 1972)

Michael Kirmse
Personal information
- Date of birth: December 10, 1972 (age 53)
- Place of birth: Flushing, New York, United States
- Height: 5 ft 9 in (1.75 m)
- Position: Defender

Youth career
- 1990–1993: Clarkson University

Senior career*
Years	Team	Apps	(Gls)
1995–1997	FSV Salmrohr	40	(1)
1997–1999	Buffalo Blizzard	25	(2)
1997–2001	Rochester Rhinos	103	(8)
2003–2004	Syracuse Salty Dogs	31	(3)
2004	Virginia Beach Mariners	20	(1)
- * Club domestic league appearances and goals

Michael Kirmse (born December 10, 1972) is an American retired professional soccer player who played as a right-back. He played for two seasons in Germany's third-tier Regionalliga, seven seasons in the USISL, and two seasons in the Indoor NPSL.

== Career ==
Kirmse was born in Flushing, New York. He played soccer at Clarkson University for four seasons from 1990 and 1993 and was inducted into the Clarkson Hall of Fame in 2005.

He started his professional career in 1995, when he received an opportunity to play in the German third-tier Regionalliga West/Südwest with FSV Salmrohr. With FSV Salmohr, he won the Rhineland Cup in 1996.

On July 2, 1997, Kirmse signed with the Rochester Rhinos in the USL A-League and played for five seasons with the Rhinos (1997–2001) While with the Rhinos, the team won three A-League championships (1998, 2000, and 2001) and was a finalist in 1999 losing to the Minnesota Thunder. Although the loss to the Minnesota Thunder was a disappointment in 1999, Kirmse was part of the Rhinos team which took the 1999 Lamar Hunt U.S. Open Cup becoming the only second division club to beat an MLS team (Colorado Rapids). In that final game Kirmse had an assist on the second goal to Yari Allnutt in the 90th minute. Through the U.S. Open Cup campaign in 1999, the Rhinos beat three other MLS teams. Against the Chicago Fire, Kirmse had the game winning assist to another Allnutt goal in a 1–0 win. Against the Dallas Burn, Kirmse had the game-winning goal in the 110th minute in golden goal overtime, when Mauro Biello hit a free kick to Darren Tilley who headed the ball off the cross bar and Kirmse scored on the rebound. The Rhinos then went on to beat the Columbus Crew in the semi-finals. While playing with the Rochester Rhinos, from 1997 to 1999, Kirmse also played indoor soccer in the National Professional Soccer League(NPSL) with the Buffalo Blizzard.

Kirmse took one year off from playing professionally when he decided to play with the new expansion team in the USISL 2nd division, the Syracuse Salty Dogs. Kirmse played in 2003 and three games in 2004 with the Syracuse Salty Dogs. After the third game with the Syracuse Salty Dogs, Kirmse was sent to the Virginia Beach Mariners and played out the remainder of his professional career with the Mariners.
