= Alexandru Burcea =

Romanian footballer (born 2005)

Personal information
- Full name: Andreas Alexandru Nicolae Burcea
- Date of birth: 27 January 2005 (age 21)
- Place of birth: Bucharest, Romania
- Height: 1.77 m (5 ft 10 in)
- Position: Winger

Team information
- Current team: Progresul Fundulea

Youth career
- –2018: Dinamo București
- 2018–2022: Academica Clinceni

Senior career*
Years	Team	Apps	(Gls)
2022–	Concordia Chiajna	58	(5)
2025	→ Oțelul Galați (loan)	8	(0)
2026	→ Jiul Petroșani (loan)		
2026–	Progresul Fundulea		

International career
2023	Romania U18	2	(0)
2023	Romania U19	1	(0)
- * Club domestic league appearances and goals as of 25 October 2025

Andreas Alexandru Nicolae Burcea (born 27 January 2005) is a Romanian professional footballer who plays as a midfielder for Liga III club Progresul Fundulea.

== Club career ==
Born in Bucharest, Burcea began his youth career at Dinamo București before moving to Academica Clinceni U19. He stepped up to senior football in the summer of 2022, signing with Concordia Chiajna. Over two and a half years with the Ilfov-based club, he made 52 official appearances (50 in Liga II and 2 in the Cupa României), scoring 5 goals. His performances also caught the attention of Romania’s Under-18 and Under-19 national teams, earning him call-ups in 2023.

In January 2025, Burcea was presented by Oțelul Galați and made his Liga I debut on 26 January 2025, in a 0–2 defeat against Sepsi Sfântu Gheorghe.
