= Mauricio Alegre =

Mexican footballer (born 1975)

Personal information
- Full name: Mauricio Alegre-Ramirez
- Date of birth: 5 November 1975 (age 50)
- Place of birth: Mexico City, Mexico
- Height: 1.68 m (5 ft 6 in)
- Position: Midfielder

Senior career*
Years	Team	Apps	(Gls)
1996	San Diego Sockers (indoor)	0	(0)
1998–2000	San Diego Flash	61	(9)
2001	San Diego Sockers (indoor)	20	(14)
2003–2004	San Diego Sockers (indoor)	43	(18)
2004	Wisconsin Rebels	7	(0)
Total		131	(41)
- * Club domestic league appearances and goals

Mauricio Alegre-Ramirez (born 5 November 1975) is a Mexican retired footballer who played professionally in the USL A-League and the second Major Indoor Soccer League.

Born in Mexico City, Alegre grew up in Tijuana. In April 1996, he signed with the San Diego Sockers of the Continental Indoor Soccer League. In 1997, he joined the San Diego Flash in the USISL A-League, playing for them until 2000. In March 2001, Alegre signed a one-year contract with the Flash. However, he instead spent the season with the San Diego Sockers in the World Indoor Soccer League. He rejoined the Sockers in 2003 when they played in the second Major Indoor Soccer League. He finished his career in 2004 with the Wisconsin Rebels of the USL Premier Development League.
