= Constantin Stănici =

Romanian footballer

Personal information
- Full name: Constantin Stănici
- Date of birth: 17 September 1969 (age 57)
- Place of birth: Bucharest, Romania
- Position: Attacking midfielder

Youth career
- Sportul Studențesc București

Senior career*
Years	Team	Apps	(Gls)
1985–1996	Sportul Studențesc București	228	(34)
1996–1997	BVSC Budapest	21	(5)
1998–1999	Minnesota Thunder	18	(1)
1998	Kansas City Attack (indoor)	5	(0)
1999–2000	Drobeta-Turnu Severin		
2000–2001	Valur	2	(0)
2004–2005	Unirea Urziceni	1	(0)
Total		275	(40)

International career
1987–1991	Romania U21	14	(4)
1990	Romania Olympic	1	(2)
1990–1992	Romania B	3	(0)
1990	Romania	1	(0)

Managerial career
- 2004–2005: Unirea Urziceni
- * Club domestic league appearances and goals

Constantin Stănici (born 17 September 1969 in Bucharest) is a Romanian former footballer who played as a midfielder.

== Club career ==
Stănici was born on 17 September 1969 in Bucharest, Romania and began playing football at local club Sportul Studențesc. He made his Divizia A debut on 28 May 1986 under coach Constantin Ardeleanu in a 2–2 draw against Victoria București. He played his first three games in European competitions during the 1986–87 UEFA Cup, helping Sportul get past Omonia Nicosia, being eliminated in the following round by Gent. In the following edition of the same competition he played five games as they got past GKS Katowice, then Peter Schmeichel and Brian Laudrup's Brøndby, winning the second leg 3–0 after an away loss by the same score, securing a historic penalty shootout qualification to the third round where they were defeated by Hellas Verona. At the end of 1989, Stănici signed a contract with Dinamo București, but it was annulled due to the outbreak of the 1989 Romanian Revolution. In the 1990–91 season he netted a personal record of eight goals. On 1 October 1995, he made his last Divizia A appearance in a 1–0 away loss to Dinamo, totaling 228 matches with 34 goals in the competition, all of them for Sportul.

In 1996, Stănici went to Hungarian side Budapesti VSC where he was teammates with compatriot Marian Popa. He made his Nemzeti Bajnokság I on 10 August, as coach László Dajka used him the full 90 minutes in a 1–1 home draw against Csepel. On 17 August, he scored his first goal in the league from a penalty kick in a 4–1 win against Stadler. Stănici also played in both legs of the 1996–97 UEFA Cup loss to Barry Town. On 10 May 1997 he made his last Nemzeti Bajnokság I appearance in a 2–2 draw against Zalaegerszeg, having a total of 21 matches with five goals netted in the competition. Afterwards, coach Dajka used him as a starter in the first leg of the 1997 Magyar Kupa final as BVSC lost 8–0 on aggregate to MTK Budapest.

In May 1998, he became a player for the American Minnesota Thunder, competing in the USL First Division (second tier). In the 1998 regular season, Stănici helped the team earn a second place in the Central Division group. In the later stages of the competition, he reached the play-off final for the league championship with Thunder, losing 1–3 to Rochester Rhinos. Before the start of the 1999 season, in order to maintain his sports form, he played six-a-side football for the Kansas City Attack team in the National Professional Soccer League. In the 1999 USL A-League season, Stănici was a reserve player and during the competition he terminated his contract with Minnesota Thunder.

Afterwards he signed a contract with Drobeta-Turnu Severin in Divizia B. In April 2000, together with 16 other players, he accused the board of inducing the players to lose a match against Chimica Târnăveni. After examining the case, the Romanian Football Federation punished the clubs with mutual walkovers for both league matches and deducted six points from Drobeta-Turnu Severin. In May 2001, Stănici signed a contract with Valur, leaving a month later after only a few games played.

He served as coach for Unirea Urziceni during the second part of the 2004–05 Divizia B season in which he also played one game, helping the team finish in fifth place.

== International career ==
Between 1987 and 1992, Stănici made several appearances for Romania's under-21, Olympic and B teams. He helped the B side win the 1991 Nehru Cup, playing in the 3–1 win over rivals Hungary in the final.

Stănici played one game for Romania when coach Mircea Rădulescu introduced him in the 57th minute to replace Ioan Lupescu in a 6–0 victory against San Marino in the Euro 1992 qualifiers.

== Personal life ==
His brother, Florin Stănici, was an ice hockey player. His nephews were also footballers, as Andrei Cristian played in the second league for Sportul Studențesc București and Dinamo București II, while Robert Stănici played in the first league for Rapid București.

He has two sons named Răzvan and Flavius.

== Honours ==
Sportul Studențesc

- Divizia A runner-up: 1985–86

Budapesti VSC

- Magyar Kupa runner-up: 1996–97

Romania B

- Nehru Cup: 1991
