= Robert Stănici =

Romanian footballer

Personal information
- Full name: Robert Dorian Stănici
- Date of birth: 7 June 2001 (age 25)
- Place of birth: Bucharest, Romania
- Position: Defensive midfielder

Youth career
- –2022: Rapid București

Senior career*
Years	Team	Apps	(Gls)
2021–2022	Rapid București	1	(0)
2022–2023	Tunari	14	(5)
2023–2024	Cetatea Turnu Măgurele	9	(0)
2024	AFC Câmpulung Muscel	5	(0)
2025-	AFC Progresul Fundulea		(0)
- * Club domestic league appearances and goals as of 21 September 2024

Robert Dorian Stănici (born 7 June 2001) is a Romanian professional footballer who plays as a midfielder.

== Club career ==
=== Rapid București ===
He made his debut on 18 December 2021 for Rapid București in Liga I match against FC Botoșani.

== Personal life ==
Robert is the nephew of international player Constantin Stănici. His father, Florin Stănici was an ice hockey player and his brother, Andrei was a football player who played in the second league for Sportul Studențesc.

== Honours ==
Tunari

- Liga III: 2022–23

AFC Câmpulung Muscel

- Liga III: 2023–24
