= 1998 CONCACAF Women's Championship =

Coupe des nations féminine de la CONCACAF 1998

Tournament details
- Host country: Canada
- City: Toronto
- Dates: 28 August – 6 September
- Teams: 8 (from 1 confederation)

Final positions
- Champions: Canada (1st title)
- Runners-up: Mexico
- Third place: Costa Rica
- Fourth place: Guatemala

Tournament statistics
- Matches played: 16
- Goals scored: 99 (6.19 per match)
- Top scorer: (Canada) Silvana Burtini (14 goals)
- Best player: (Canada) Silvana Burtini

The 1998 CONCACAF Women's Championship was the fourth staging of the CONCACAF Women's Championship, the international women's association football tournament for North America, Central America and Caribbean nations organized by CONCACAF. The final stage of the tournament took place at Etobicoke and Scarborough in Toronto, Ontario, Canada. Canada took the sole automatic qualifying place for the 1999 FIFA Women's World Cup by finishing first. The runner-up, Mexico, qualified after defeating Argentina in a two-leg playoff in December 1998.

The tournament was originally planned to take place in Haiti, but was moved due to disputes between the Haitian government and the Haitian Football Federation. This was the only edition of CONCACAF's Women's Championship or the CONCACAF Women's Gold Cup in which the traditional superpower of CONCACAF women's football, the United States, did not participate. This was because they directly qualified for the 1999 Women's World Cup as hosts of the event.

== Qualification ==
=== UNCAF qualifying tournament ===
The 1998 UNCAF Qualifying Tournament took place in Guatemala City between 19 July and 25 July 1998. It was won by the hosts Guatemala after defeating Haiti 1–0 in the final match. Guatemala, Haiti and Costa Rica qualified for the 1998 CONCACAF Women's Championship.

==== Group A ====
| Team | Pld | W | D | L | GF | GA | GD | Pts | Qualification |
|---|---|---|---|---|---|---|---|---|---|
| Haiti | 2 | 2 | 0 | 0 | 9 | 2 | +7 | 6 | Final tournament and final match |
| Costa Rica | 2 | 1 | 0 | 1 | 17 | 2 | +15 | 3 | Third place play-off |
| Guatemala B | 2 | 0 | 0 | 2 | 1 | 24 | −23 | 0 | |

19 July 1998

| Costa Rica | 17–0 | Guatemala B |
|---|---|---|
| Mora (?); Alemán (?); Contreras (?); Araya (?); Carmona (?); Castro (?); Álvarez (?) | Report |

Estadio Mateo Flores, Guatemala City

21 July 1998

| Haiti | 2–0 | Costa Rica |

Estadio Mateo Flores, Guatemala City

23 July 1998

| Haiti | 7–1 | Guatemala B |

Estadio Mateo Flores, Guatemala City

==== Group B ====
| Team | Pld | W | D | L | GF | GA | GD | Pts | Qualification |
|---|---|---|---|---|---|---|---|---|---|
| Guatemala | 2 | 2 | 0 | 0 | 15 | 1 | +14 | 6 | Final tournament and final match |
| El Salvador | 2 | 0 | 1 | 1 | 2 | 5 | −3 | 1 | Third place play-off |
| Honduras | 2 | 0 | 1 | 1 | 1 | 12 | −11 | 1 | |

19 July 1998

| Guatemala | 11–0 | Honduras |

Estadio Mateo Flores, Guatemala City

21 July 1998

| El Salvador | 1–1 | Honduras |

Estadio Mateo Flores, Guatemala City

23 July 1998

| Guatemala | 4–1 | El Salvador |

Estadio Mateo Flores, Guatemala City

==== Third place play-off ====
25 July 1998

| Costa Rica | 5–1 | El Salvador |

Estadio Mateo Flores, Guatemala City

==== Final ====
25 July 1998

| Guatemala | 1–0 | Haiti |

Estadio Mateo Flores, Guatemala City

=== CFU Qualifying Round ===
The CFU Qualifying Round consisted of home-and-away ties. It is not clear whether Martinique and Puerto Rico received a bye to the finals, or whether their (unknown) intended opponents withdrew.

| Team 1 | Agg. | Team 2 | 1st leg | 2nd leg |
|---|---|---|---|---|
| Trinidad and Tobago | 15–1 | Guyana | 7–0 | 8–1 |
| Haiti | w/o^{1} | Bahamas | — | — |

^{1} Haiti were to play Bahamas but apparently the latter withdrew.

7 August 1998

| Trinidad and Tobago | 7–0 | Guyana |

Centre of Excellence Ground, Macoya

9 August 1998

| Trinidad and Tobago | 8–1 | Guyana |

Centre of Excellence Ground, Macoya

Costa Rica, Guatemala, Haiti, Martinique, Puerto Rico and Trinidad and Tobago qualified for the final tournament.

== Participating teams ==
| Team | Qualification | Appearance | Previous best performances |
North American Zone (NAFU)
| Canada | Automatic | 4th | Runners-up (1991, 1994) |
| Mexico | Automatic | 3rd | Third Place (1994) |
Central American Zone (UNCAF) qualified through Central American qualifying tournament
| Costa Rica | UNCAF Qualifying Tournament third-place | 2nd | Group Stage (1991) |
| Guatemala | UNCAF Qualifying Tournament winners | 1st | — |
Caribbean Zone (CFU) qualified through Caribbean qualifying round
| Haiti | Winners against Bahamas | 2nd | Group Stage (1991) |
| Martinique | Unknown | 2nd | Group Stage (1991) |
| Puerto Rico | Unknown | 1st | — |
| Trinidad and Tobago | Winners against Guyana | 3rd | Third Place (1991) |

== Venues ==
Toronto
Centennial Park Stadium
Capacity: 2,200
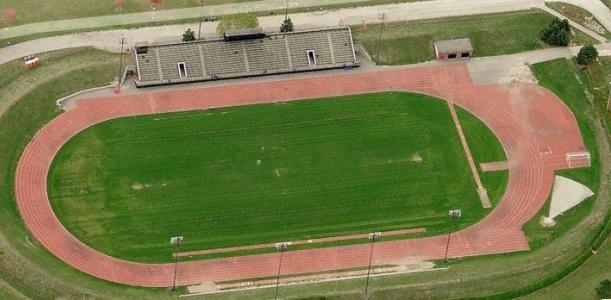

== Final tournament ==
=== Group A ===
| Team | Pld | W | D | L | GF | GA | GD | Pts |
|---|---|---|---|---|---|---|---|---|
| Canada | 3 | 3 | 0 | 0 | 39 | 0 | +39 | 9 |
| Guatemala | 3 | 2 | 0 | 1 | 10 | 4 | +6 | 6 |
| Martinique | 3 | 1 | 0 | 2 | 9 | 16 | −7 | 3 |
| Puerto Rico | 3 | 0 | 0 | 3 | 0 | 38 | −38 | 0 |

28 August 1998

| Canada | 21–0 | Puerto Rico |
|---|---|---|
| Burtini 2', 7', 9', 15', 24', 26', 40', 43'; Rosenow 12', 69', 70', 80'; Franck 18', 62'; Hooper 21', 38'; Morneau 36', 44'; Blaskovic 64', 73'; Muir 75' | Report |

Centennial Park Stadium
Toronto, Canada
Attendance: 2050
28 August 1998

| Guatemala | 2–0 | Martinique |

Canada

30 August 1998

| Puerto Rico | 0–8 | Guatemala |

Canada
30 August 1998

| Canada | 14–0 | Martinique |
|---|---|---|
| Burtini 3', 13', 26'; Hooper 21'; Muir 28'; Rosenow 30', 38', 44', 55'; Morneau 65'; Blaskovic 72', 77'; Harvey 81'; Smith 85' | Report |

Centennial Park Stadium
Toronto, Canada
Attendance: 2121

1 September 1998

| Puerto Rico | 0–9 | Martinique |

Canada
1 September 1998

| Canada | 4–0 | Guatemala |
|---|---|---|
| Hooper 2'; Burtini 23', 26', 53' | Report |

Centennial Park Stadium
Toronto, Canada
Attendance: 2756

=== Group B ===
| Team | Pld | W | D | L | GF | GA | GD | Pts |
|---|---|---|---|---|---|---|---|---|
| Mexico | 3 | 2 | 1 | 0 | 12 | 5 | +7 | 7 |
| Costa Rica | 3 | 2 | 0 | 1 | 7 | 5 | +2 | 6 |
| Trinidad and Tobago | 3 | 1 | 1 | 1 | 5 | 6 | −1 | 4 |
| Haiti | 3 | 0 | 0 | 3 | 3 | 11 | −8 | 0 |

29 August 1998

| Trinidad and Tobago | 2–1 | Haiti |

Canada
29 August 1998

| Mexico | 3–2 | Costa Rica |

Canada

31 August 1998

| Haiti | 1–7 | Mexico |

Canada
31 August 1998

| Costa Rica | 3–1 | Trinidad and Tobago |

Canada

2 September 1998

| Costa Rica | 2–1 | Haiti |

Canada
2 September 1998

| Trinidad and Tobago | 2–2 | Mexico |

Canada

=== Knockout stage ===
==== Bracket ====
Semi-finals
4 September
Guatemala | 0
Mexico | 8
4 September
Canada | 2
Costa Rica | 0

Final
6 September
Mexico | 0
Canada | 1
Third place
6 September
Guatemala | 0
Costa Rica | 4

==== Semi-finals ====
4 September 1998

| Guatemala | 0–8 | Mexico |

Canada

4 September 1998

| Canada | 2–0 | Costa Rica |
|---|---|---|
| Hooper 19', 39' | Report |

Centennial Park Stadium
Toronto, Canada
Attendance: 2834

==== Third place playoff ====
6 September 1998

| Costa Rica | 4–0 | Guatemala |

Canada

==== Final ====
6 September 1998

| Canada | 1–0 | Mexico |
|---|---|---|
| Smith 42' | Report |

Centennial Park Stadium
Toronto, Canada
Attendance: 4971

Canada won the tournament and qualified for 1999 FIFA Women's World Cup. Mexico advanced to CONCACAF–CONMEBOL play-off.

== Awards ==
1998 CONCACAF's Women's Championship winners

Canada
First title

== Statistics ==
=== Final ranking ===
| Pos | Team | Pld | W | D | L | GF | GA | GD | Pts |
|---|---|---|---|---|---|---|---|---|---|
| 1 | Canada | 5 | 5 | 0 | 0 | 42 | 0 | +42 | 15 |
| 2 | Mexico | 5 | 3 | 1 | 1 | 20 | 6 | +14 | 10 |
| 3 | Costa Rica | 5 | 3 | 0 | 2 | 11 | 7 | +4 | 9 |
| 4 | Guatemala | 5 | 2 | 0 | 3 | 10 | 16 | −6 | 6 |
Eliminated in the group stage
| 5 | Trinidad and Tobago | 3 | 1 | 1 | 1 | 5 | 6 | −1 | 4 |
| 6 | Martinique | 3 | 1 | 0 | 2 | 9 | 16 | −7 | 3 |
| 7 | Haiti | 3 | 0 | 0 | 3 | 3 | 11 | −8 | 0 |
| 8 | Puerto Rico | 3 | 0 | 0 | 3 | 0 | 38 | −38 | 0 |
