= Mugurel Dumitru =

Romanian footballer

Personal information
- Full name: Mugurel V. Dumitru
- Date of birth: November 13, 1972 (age 53)
- Place of birth: Romania
- Height: 5 ft 10 in (1.78 m)
- Position: Forward

Senior career*
Years	Team	Apps	(Gls)
1998	Silicon Valley Ambassadors	?	(11)
1999–2001	San Diego Flash	49	(15)
2001	El Paso Patriots	13	(3)
- * Club domestic league appearances and goals

Mugurel Dumitru is a retired Romanian association football forward who played professionally in the USISL A-League.

In 1998, Dumitru moved to the United States to play for the Silicon Valley Ambassadors of the USISL Pro Development League. In 1999, he moved to the San Diego Flash of the USISL A-League. In April 2001, the Flash ceased operations due to financial problems. The league took control of the team and financed its operations through the end of the season. However, several Flash players left the team, including Dumitru who moved to the El Paso Patriots where he finished his American career.
