= Jason Cairns =

American soccer player

Personal information
- Place of birth: United States
- Position: Forward

Youth career
- 1994–1997: The College of New Jersey

Senior career*
Years	Team	Apps	(Gls)
1998–1999	Cincinnati Riverhawks	45	(12)
2000–2001	New Jersey Stallions	32	(9)
Total		75	(21)
- * Club domestic league appearances and goals

Jason Cairns is an American retired soccer forward who played professionally for the Cincinnati Riverhawks and the New Jersey Stallions.

Raised in Point Pleasant Beach, New Jersey, Cairns played prep soccer at Point Pleasant Beach High School.

Cairns grew up playing for Jersey Shore Boca youth teams. In 1994, he entered Trenton State College (renamed The College of New Jersey in 1996) where he was a 1995 NSCAA Division III Second Team All American soccer player. That season, Cairns and his teammates won the NCAA Division III Men's Soccer Championship and Cairns was selected as an NSCAA Division III First Team All American. In 1997, he was again named to the Division III First Team and was the 1997 NSCAA Division III Player of the Year.

In 1998, the Cincinnati Riverhawks selected Cairns in the second round (32nd overall) of the 1998 A-League Draft. In 1998, he was Second Team All League. In 2000, Cairns moved to the New Jersey Stallions of the USL D-3 Pro League where he spent two seasons.

In December 1997, the Philadelphia KiXX drafted Cairns in the first round of the National Professional Soccer League. However, Cairns never played indoor soccer professionally.
