= Lee Tschantret =

American soccer player

Personal information
- Date of birth: April 10, 1969 (age 57)
- Place of birth: Albany, New York, U.S.
- Height: 5 ft 8 in (1.73 m)
- Positions: Midfielder; forward; defender

College career
Years	Team	Apps	(Gls)
1987–1990	Albany Great Danes		

Senior career*
Years	Team	Apps	(Gls)
1991	Albany Capitals	20	(2)
1992–1994	Harrisburg Heat (indoor)	43	(35)
1993	Tampa Bay Rowdies	4	(0)
1994–1997	Kansas City Attack (indoor)	106	(117)
1995–1996	New York Centaurs		
1997–1998	Hershey Wildcats	42	(17)
1998–1999	Philadelphia KiXX (indoor)	24	(11)
1999	St. Louis Ambush (indoor)	12	(9)
1999	Staten Island Vipers	15	(1)
1999–2000	Detroit Rockers (indoor)	42	(50)
2000	Pittsburgh Riverhounds	6	(2)
2000–2007	Baltimore Blast (indoor)	235	(171)
2008–2009	Philadelphia KiXX (indoor)	15	(1)

Managerial career
- 2006–2007: Loyola Blakefield (assistant)
- 2007–2023: Loyola Blakefield
- 2026–: Sporting Kansas City II
- * Club domestic league appearances and goals

Lee Tschantret (born April 10, 1969) is a retired soccer defender. He spent most of his career in the National Professional Soccer League and its successor, the Major Indoor Soccer League. He also played outdoor soccer in the American Professional Soccer League and USL A-League.

== Youth ==
Tschantret is originally from Albany, New York. He attended the University at Albany where he played on the school's NCAA Division III soccer team from 1987 to 1990. During his four-season he scored 50 goals and added 40 assists. He was a 1988 second team and a 1989 first team All American.

== Professional ==
In 1991, he played 20 games, scoring 2 goals, for the Albany Capitals of the American Professional Soccer League. That year, the Capitals went to the APSL championship, losing to the San Francisco Bay Blackhawks. In 1992, he played for the Harrisburg Heat in the National Professional Soccer League. In 1994, he move to the Kansas City Attack. In 1995 and 1996, he played the summer outdoor season with the New York Centaurs in the A-League. In 1998, he played for the Hershey Wildcats in the A-League. He was named to the 1998 First XI (All Star Team). That fall, he played for the Philadelphia KiXX before the team traded him in February 1999 to the St. Louis Steamers for Ken Snow. He returned to the A-League in 1999, this time with the Staten Island Vipers. In the fall of 1999, he signed with the Detroit Rockers, but only played one season with them before moving to the Baltimore Blast. In 2000, he played six games, scoring two goals, with the Pittsburgh Riverhounds. He finished his career in the MISL with the Blast in 2007.

Tschantret led the Major Indoor Soccer League in penalty minutes all time with 748. He is on pace to be the 15th player to record 1000 points.

On February 2, 2007, he gained his 1000th assist in a victory over the KiXX.

In November, 2008, Tschantret signed with the Philadelphia KiXX of the NISL.

== Coaching ==
Tschantret holds a USSF National A Coaching License. Tschantret coached at Loyola Blakefield from 2006 until 2023. On August 17, 2023, Sporting Kansas City announced that Tschantret would join the Academy as the U-19 head coach.
