= Nate Hetherington =

American soccer player

Nate Ryan Hetherington
Personal information
- Full name: Nathan Hetherington
- Date of birth: April 30, 1974 (age 52)
- Place of birth: San Diego, California, United States
- Height: 5 ft 7 in (1.70 m)
- Position: Midfielder

Youth career
- 1994–1996: UC San Diego Tritons

Senior career*
Years	Team	Apps	(Gls)
1998–2001	San Diego Flash	103	(26)
2002	Atlanta Silverbacks	16	(3)
2002–2003	San Diego Sockers (indoor)		(1)
2005–2009	San Diego Fusion (indoor)		
2009–2012	San Diego Sockers (indoor)		(9)
- * Club domestic league appearances and goals

Nate Hetherington is an American soccer player who played professionally in the USL A-League.

Hetherington grew up in Encinitas, California playing for the La Jolla Nomads youth club. He graduated from San Dieguito High School where he earned Player of the Year of all schools in San Diego County. He then attended the University of California, San Diego and still stands in the top ten of most points. While there he played for the Tritons soccer team from 1994 to 1996.

In 1997, the Orange County Zodiac selected Hetherington in the Territorial Round (sixteenth overall) of the A-League draft. Hetherington did not sign with the Zodiac. In 1998, he turned professional with the San Diego Flash of the USL A-League. He was the first player signed to the new San Diego Flash. In March 2002, Hetherington moved to the Atlanta Silverbacks after the Flash disbanded. In 2002, the Harrisburg Heat selected Hetherington in the Major Indoor Soccer League territorial draft as the first round first pick. The San Diego Sockers then acquired Hetherington in exchange for Renato Pereira. After a successful year with the SD Sockers, Hetherington decided to retire and focus on coaching. By this time, Hetherington had begun to coach youth soccer in San Diego. He came out of retirement to rejoin the San Diego Sockers team as captain. That same year he also played for the United States men's national soccer team Hetherington scored seven goals in twelve regular season games, but tore his anterior cruciate ligament during the playoffs and lost the entire 2010–2011 season. He returned in 2011 for one last season with the Sockers. He is currently living in Encinitas, California with his wife and two daughters where he works as assistant director for the Rancho Santa Fe Attack.
