= Suzanne Muir =

Canadian soccer player

Personal information
- Date of birth: July 6, 1970 (age 56)
- Place of birth: Brockville, Ontario, Canada
- Height: 1.73 m (5 ft 8 in)
- Position: Defender

International career
Years	Team	Apps	(Gls)
1995–1999	Canada	31	(2)

Suzanne Muir (born July 6, 1970) is a Canadian soccer defender who played for the Canada women's national soccer team, appearing at the 1995 and 1999 FIFA Women's World Cups. She was part of Canada's 1998 CONCACAF Women's Championship winning squad. Muir played university soccer for the Saint Mary's Huskies. In 2021, she was inducted into the Canada Soccer Hall of Fame, becoming the first player from Nova Scotia to receive the honour. Muir is also a member of the Saint Mary's University Athletics Hall of Fame (2014) and the Nova Scotia Sport Hall of Fame (2019).

Since her playing career, Muir has worked in law enforcement, joining the Vancouver Police Department in 1995. In 2023 she was appointed chief officer of Metro Vancouver Transit Police, the first woman to hold that position.
