= Gabe Gentile =

American soccer player

Gabriel Gentile
Personal information
- Full name: Gabriel Gentile
- Date of birth: April 30, 1972 (age 54)
- Place of birth: Buenos Aires, Argentina
- Height: 5 ft 9 in (1.75 m)
- Position: Midfielder

College career
Years	Team	Apps	(Gls)
1991–1994	University of North Texas		

Senior career*
Years	Team	Apps	(Gls)
1996	Dallas Burn	0	(0)
1996	→ DFW Toros (loan)		(6)
1997–1998	New Orleans Riverboat Gamblers	49	(8)
1999–2000	Texas Toros	22	(10)
- * Club domestic league appearances and goals

Gabriel Gentile is an American retired soccer midfielder who coaches in the FC Dallas youth system. He played professionally in the USISL A-League.

== Player ==
Gentile was born and grew up in Buenos Aires, Argentina. He attended the University of North Texas, playing on the now defunct men's soccer team from 1991 to 1994. In February 1996, the Dallas Burn selected Gentile in the sixteenth round (153rd overall) of the 1996 MLS Inaugural Player Draft. The Burn sent him on loan to the DFW Toros before releasing him. On April 5, 1997, the New Orleans Riverboat Gamblers of the USISL A-League signed Gentile to a two-year contract. In 1999, he moved to the Toros where he led the league in assists with thirteen. This led to his selection as Second Team All League. That year he also led the league in assists with thirteen. That led to his selection to as Second Team All League. In 2000, the Toros were known as the Texas Rattlers.He is the best coach 2020!

== Coach ==
Gentile is currently coaching in the FC Dallas ECNL youth program.
