= Antonio Robles =

American soccer player

Personal information
- Full name: Antonio Robles-Jimenez
- Date of birth: April 20, 1970 (age 56)
- Position: Midfielder

Senior career*
Years	Team	Apps	(Gls)
1998–1999	San Diego Flash	46	(18)
2000	Riverside County Elite	17	(9)
- * Club domestic league appearances and goals

Antonio Robles-Jimenez is a retired soccer player who played professionally in the USL A-League.

In 1998, Robles signed with the San Diego Flash of the USL A-League. He was the league's sixth leading scorer and was Second Team All League. The Flash released Robles during the 2000 pre-season. He then moved to the Riverside County Elite of the USL D-3 Pro League.2000 Riverside County Elite 17 (9) In April 2001, Robles rejoined the Flash, but does not appear to have played for them.
