= Kevin Anderson (soccer) =

American soccer player and coach

Personal information
- Date of birth: September 17, 1971 (age 55)
- Place of birth: Rockville Centre, New York, U.S.
- Height: 5 ft 6 in (1.68 m)
- Position: Midfielder

College career
Years	Team	Apps	(Gls)
1989–1990	George Mason Patriots		
1991–1992	Southern Connecticut Owls		

Senior career*
Years	Team	Apps	(Gls)
1993–1994	Boston Storm		
1995–1997	Long Island Rough Riders		
1998	Minnesota Thunder	26	(7)
1999–2000	Colorado Rapids	21	(2)
1999	→ MLS Pro 40 (loan)	4	(0)
1999	→ Raleigh Express (loan)	4	(1)
2000–2001	Tampa Bay Mutiny	27	(3)
2000	→ Charleston Battery (loan)	1	(0)
2001	→ Charleston Battery (loan)	1	(0)
2001–2002	Charleston Battery	32	(1)
2003	Minnesota Thunder	24	(0)

Managerial career
- 1993: Columbia Lions (assistant)
- 1998–1999: Southern Connecticut Owls (assistant)
- 2004–2006: Columbia Lions (assistant)
- 2006: Columbia Lions (interim)
- 2006–2008: Boston College Eagles (assistant)
- 2009–2022: Columbia Lions
- 2018: New York Cosmos B
- 2023–2026: Southern Connecticut Owls
- 2026–: Michigan Wolverines (associate head coach)
- * Club domestic league appearances and goals

Kevin Anderson (born September 17, 1971) is an American retired soccer player who played professionally in the Major League Soccer and the USL A-League. He is the associate head coach of the University of Michigan men's soccer team.

== Player ==
=== Youth ===
In 1989, Anderson began his collegiate career at George Mason University. He transferred to Southern Connecticut State University after his sophomore season. He was an NSCAA First Team as the Owls won the 1992 NCAA Division II Men's Soccer Championship. He graduated with a bachelor's degree in liberal studies.

=== Professional ===
In 1993, Anderson began his professional career with the Boston Storm, which played a six-game independent schedule that year. In 1994, Anderson remained with the Storm as the team competed in the USISL. In 1995, he moved to the Long Island Rough Riders, where he played for three seasons. Anderson and his teammates won the 1995 USISL championship. In 1998, he signed with the Minnesota Thunder where he was named team captain. The Thunder fell in the USISL championship final that season as Anderson was named Second Team All League. That season, he also scored the USL goal of the year. On February 8, 1998, the Colorado Rapids selected Anderson in the first round (seventh overall) of the 1999 MLS Supplemental Draft. On April 19, 2000, the Rapids traded Anderson to the Tampa Bay Mutiny in exchange for a third-round pick in the 2001 MLS SuperDraft and a second-round pick in the 2002 MLS SuperDraft. Over two seasons, the Mutiny twice sent Anderson on loan to the Charleston Battery of the USL A-League. The Mutiny waived Anderson on August 1, 2001. On August 2, 2001, Anderson signed with the Charleston Battery. He would finish the 2001 USL season with the Battery, then continue to play for them in 2002. In 2003, he finished his career with the Minnesota Thunder.

=== International ===
Anderson also spent time with the United States U-17 and U-20 teams.

== Coach ==
In 1993, Anderson spent one season as an assistant coach with the Columbia Lions men’ soccer team. Anderson would also coach the Branford High School boys soccer team of Connecticut in the 95/96 and 96/97 season. He later served as an assistant with Southern Connecticut State. In 2004, Anderson returned to Columbia as an assistant, spending time as acting head coach in 2006. Later that year, he moved to Boston College as an assistant to Ed Kelly. In December 2008, Anderson became head coach of the Columbia University men's soccer team.

In addition to his duties with Columbia, Anderson was also the head coach of New York Cosmos B in the National Premier Soccer League for one year, 2018.

On March 20, 2023, Anderson was named the head coach at his alma mater, Southern Connecticut State University, where he was also a former assistant coach of the Southern Connecticut Owls.
