= Jamie Munro =

Venezuelan-American soccer player

Personal information
- Date of birth: April 22, 1976 (age 50)
- Place of birth: Caracas, Venezuela
- Height: 5 ft 10 in (1.78 m)
- Position: Defender

College career
Years	Team	Apps	(Gls)
1994–1997	San Diego Toreros		

Senior career*
Years	Team	Apps	(Gls)
1998–2001	San Diego Flash	71	(4)
- * Club domestic league appearances and goals

Jamie Munro is a retired Venezuelan-American soccer player. He played professionally in the USL A-League.

Born in Venezuela, Munro grew up in California. He attended the University of San Diego where he played on the men's soccer team from 1994 to 1997. He graduated with a bachelor's degree in finance. In 1998, the San Diego Flash selected Munro in the Territorial Round of the USL A-League draft. In 2001, he retired and became a mortgage banker.
