= Liz Smith (soccer) =

Canadian soccer player

Personal information
- Date of birth: 25 September 1975 (age 51)
- Place of birth: Edmonton, Alberta, Canada
- Height: 1.70 m (5 ft 7 in)
- Position: Midfielder

International career^{‡}
Years	Team	Apps	(Gls)
1996–2000	Canada	22	(2)
- ‡ National team caps and goals as of 19 June 1999 (before the 1999 FIFA Women's World Cup)

Liz Smith (born 25 September 1975) is a Canadian soccer player who played as a midfielder for the Canada women's national soccer team. She was part of the team at the 1999 FIFA Women's World Cup.
