= Carlos Zavala =

Mexican-American soccer player (born 1969)

Personal information
- Date of birth: June 11, 1969 (age 57)
- Place of birth: Toluca, Mexico
- Height: 5 ft 10 in (1.78 m)
- Positions: Midfielder; defender

College career
Years	Team	Apps	(Gls)
1988–1991	Cal State LA Golden Eagles		

Senior career*
Years	Team	Apps	(Gls)
1992–	Toluca		
1994	East Los Angeles Cobras		
1995	Arizona Sandsharks (indoor)	20	(9)
1996–1997	Tampa Bay Terror (indoor)	61	(42)
1996	Jacksonville Cyclones		
1997	Indiana Twisters (indoor)		
1997–1998	Kansas City Attack (indoor)	31	(11)
1998–2002	Rochester Rhinos	88	(4)
1998–1999	Detroit Rockers (indoor)	27	(7)
1999–2001	Buffalo Blizzard (indoor)	78	(39)
- * Club domestic league appearances and goals

Carlos Zavala is a Mexican-American former soccer midfielder who played professionally in Mexico and the United States.

== Youth ==
Zavala's father, Carlos “Chino” Zavala, played professionally for Deportivo Toluca F.C. When his father retired from professional soccer, he moved the family to Santa Ana, California. In 1988, Zavala graduated from Saddleback High School where he played on the school's football and soccer teams. He also played club soccer with Colo-Colo of Orange County. Zavala attended Cal State Los Angeles, playing on the men's soccer team. He graduated in 1992 with a bachelor's degree in kinesiology.

== Professional ==
In 1992, Zavala signed with Deportivo Toluca F.C. In 1994, Zavala played for the East Los Angeles Cobras in the USISL. In 1995, he joined the Arizona Sandsharks of the Continental Indoor Soccer League. On January 13, 1996, Zavala signed with the Tampa Bay Terror at the midpoint of the 1995-1996 National Professional Soccer League. He continued to play for the Terror through the 1996–1997 season, leading the team in scoring despite playing as a defender/defensive midfielder. During the summer of 1996, Zavala played for the Jacksonville Cyclones in the USISL Select League. In April 1997, the Seattle SeaDogs selected Zavala in the Continental Indoor Soccer League draft. On June 2, 1997, the SeaDogs traded Zavala to the Houston Hotshots for a 1998 second round draft pick and cash. However, Zavala ended up playing for the Indiana Twisters that season. On October 17, 1997, the Kansas City Attack signed Zavala after the Tampa Bay Terror folded.

In 1998, he joined the Rochester Rhinos of the USISL A-League and played each summer for the Rhinos through the 2002 A-League season. Zavala and his teammates won the 1998, 2000 and 2001 A-League titles and the 1999 U.S. Open Cup. In the fall of 1998, Zavala signed with the Detroit Rockers of the NPSL. On March 20, 1999, the Rockers traded Zavala to the Buffalo Blizzard for future considerations. The Blizzard folded in 2001. In August 2001, the Harrisburg Heat selected Zavala in the dispersal draft.
