= Jerome Watson =

American soccer player

Personal information
- Date of birth: September 28, 1964 (age 62)
- Place of birth: United States
- Height: 6 ft 1 in (1.85 m)
- Position: Forward

Youth career
- University of California, Davis

Senior career*
| Years | Team | Apps | (Gls) |
| 1988–1990 | San Diego Nomads | | |
| 1991–1996 | Colorado Foxes | | |
| 1997 | California Jaguars | 24 | (10) |
| 1998–2001 | San Diego Flash | 86 | (16) |

Managerial career
- San Diego Flash (assistant)
- 2003: San Diego City College
- 2013: San Diego Flash
- 2021: San Diego Nomads
- * Club domestic league appearances and goals as of 17:47, 24 February 2007 (UTC) ‡ National team caps and goals as of 7 December 2006

Jerome Watson (born September 28, 1974) is an American former soccer forward who spent time in the Western Soccer Alliance, American Professional Soccer League and the A-League.

Watson grew up in San Diego, California, and attended La Jolla High School. He played college soccer at the University of California, Davis, where he was named All-Conference four times and Conference MVP once.

In 1988, Watson joined the San Diego Nomads of the Western Soccer League (WSL). That year he led the Nomads in scoring with six goals which also put him in second place on the WSL goals list. The following season, he topped the league's points list with 10 goals and 7 assists. Despite that, he was not selected to the WSL All Star team. He also was never considered for the U.S. Men's National Team in the lead up to the FIFA World Cup in Italy in 1990, despite that team's dearth of quality strikers. Before the 1990 season, the WSL and the American Soccer League merged to form the American Professional Soccer League (APSL). However, at the end of the 1990 season, the Nomads withdrew from the APSL and Watson moved to the Colorado Foxes (APSL). He remained with the Foxes through the end of the 1996 season. The APSL, which had been renamed the A-League, merged with the USISL between the 1996 and 1997 seasons. With the merger, Watson moved to the California Jaguars for a single season with the team. In 1998, he made his last move as a professional player when he joined the San Diego Flash. The Flash were the old Colorado Foxes and this was their first season in its new city having moved from Colorado. Watson remained with the Flash through at least the 2001 season, spending some time as an assistant coach with them.

In 2003, Watson spent a single season as coach of the San Diego City College soccer team.

He continues to play rec league soccer with the San Diego Nomads senior team in the San Diego County Soccer League. He currently is the assistant coach for San Diego United of the NPSL and also coaches their Under 23 team and was the head coach for the San Diego Flash, and coach for the San Diego Nomads.
