= Kevin Wilson (footballer, born 1976) =

Jamaican footballer

Personal information
- Date of birth: 13 September 1976 (age 50)
- Place of birth: Jamaica
- Position: Striker

Team information
- Current team: Arnett Gardens

Senior career*
Years	Team	Apps	(Gls)
1998	Montreal Impact	23	(9)
2004–2005	Arnett Gardens	?	(8)
2005	Montreal Impact	8	(3)
2006–present	Arnett Gardens		

International career^{‡}
1995–2002	Jamaica		
- * Club domestic league appearances and goals as of 22 December 2007 ‡ National team caps and goals as of 11 December 2007

Kevin Wilson (born 13 September 1976) is a Jamaican football striker who currently plays for Arnett Gardens F.C.

== Club career ==
Nicknamed 'Pele', he has also played two seasons (1998 and 2005) for Montreal Impact in the USL First Division. He scored nine goals for Montreal in the 1998 season, and returned in 2005 to make an impact by scoring two goals in his first game against the Puerto Rico Islanders. He only scored one goal more and played eight games in total that season.

== International career ==
He made his debut for the Reggae Boyz in 1995, but never managed to become a regular squad member. He scored on his debut for Jamaica versus Norway. The game ended in a 1–1 draw. He played his last international match in 2002 against India.
