= Yari Allnutt =

American soccer player (born 1970)

Personal information
- Date of birth: February 17, 1970 (age 56)
- Place of birth: Baltimore, Maryland, United States
- Height: 5 ft 11 in (1.80 m)
- Position: Midfielder

College career
Years	Team	Apps	(Gls)
1989–1992	Portland Pilots		

Senior career*
Years	Team	Apps	(Gls)
1989	San Diego Nomads		
1994	Los Angeles Salsa		
1994–1996	Inter de Tijuana		
1996	Irapuato		
1996–1997	Carolina Dynamo	48	(29)
1996	→ Kansas City Wizards (loan)	1	(1)
1998–2000	Rochester Rhinos	102	(40)
2001	New England Revolution	9	(0)
2004	Rochester Rhinos	22	(1)

International career
1992–1993	United States	5	(2)
- * Club domestic league appearances and goals

Yari Allnutt (born February 17, 1970) is an American retired soccer player who played professionally in Mexico and the United States, including the American Professional Soccer League and Major League Soccer. He earned five caps with the United States national team, including games at the 1992 Summer Olympics in Barcelona.

== Early life and education ==
Allnutt was born in Baltimore, Maryland, and his family moved to Mexico when he was a year old. He is Jewish.

He played street soccer in Mexico, but did not join an organized team until his family moved to San Diego, California when he was ten. Three years later, he began playing for the top youth club La Jolla Nomads, coached by Derek Armstrong. He moved up the clubs age groups, winning the McGuire Cup with the U-19 team.

After graduating from University City High School in 1989, Allnutt played with the Nomads' senior team, also coached by Armstrong, the San Diego Nomads of the Western Soccer League. That year the Nomads won the WSL championship, defeating the San Francisco Bay Blackhawks 1–0.

That autumn, Allnutt entered the University of Portland where he played forward on the Clive Charles coached men's soccer team from 1989 to 1992. He was a four-year starter on the team, scoring 27 goals and assisting on 17 others. He earned second-team All-American honors his senior year, 1992. On May 5, 2010, the school inducted Allnutt into its Athletic Hall of Fame.

== National teams ==
In 1991, he played for the U.S. at the Pan American Games. He scored a goal in a 2–1 first round victory over Honduras. In 1992, Allnutt continued to play for the junior national team when he started all three games for the United States at the 1992 Summer Olympics in Barcelona. While Allnutt played forward for Portland, he slotted back into the midfield or defensive winger with the Olympic and national teams. The U.S. team went 1–1–1 in group play and failed to make the second round. He earned his first cap with the senior national team later that year when he came on for Cobi Jones in a September 3 victory over Canada. He played one more game for the national team in 1992 and three in 1993. He scored in his only start for the team, a 4–1 loss to Honduras on March 25, 1993. In 2005, at the tail end of his career, he played for the United States in the 17th World Maccabiah Games. Allnutt helped the team take silver, losing to Argentina in the finals.

== Professional ==
In 1993, the Portland Pride of the Continental Indoor Soccer League drafted Allnutt, but he lost the entire year after having surgery in June for torn groin ligaments. In 1994, he joined the Los Angeles Salsa of the American Professional Soccer League.

Using his previous years living in Mexico, with his fluency in Spanish, Allnutt then moved to Mexico, where he became a forward on Primera División A (division below the Premier Division) Inter de Tijuana. He scored 27 goals during his time with the team. He also spent time with Club Irapuato. While in Mexico, the New England Revolution of Major League Soccer drafted Allnutt in the 6th round (55 overall) of the 1996 MLS Inaugural Player Draft. However, the Revs released him on April 12, 1996. He signed with the Carolina Dynamo of the USISL Select League in March. On May 22, 1996, the Dynamo sent Allnutt on loan to the Kansas City Wiz for one game. In that game, he was a second half sub, playing 45 minutes and scoring a goal against the Revs.

After being released by the Wizards, Allnutt joined the Carolina Dynamo for two seasons, earning team MVP honors both years. In 1996, he was the captain of the 1996 USISL Select League All Star Team. In 1997, he was the co-captain of the Dynamo and the team's leading scorer. He was named to the league's All Star list, known as the First XI, in 1997. On November 4, 1997, Allnutt signed with the Rochester Raging Rhinos. In 1998, he scored 14 goals and again made the A-League First XI. In 1999, Allnutt was part of the Rhinos team which took the 1999 Lamar Hunt U.S. Open Cup becoming the only second division club to beat an MLS team (Colorado Rapids). Allnutt scored one of the goals for Rochester in that game. In 2000, the Rhinos continued its winning ways, by running away with the A-League championship, defeating the Minnesota Thunder 3–0 with Allnutt bagging one of the goals. In 2001, Allnutt again made the A-League First XI. His outstanding play led to the New England Revolution drafting him, for a second time, in the fourth round (42 overall) of the 2001 MLS SuperDraft. Allnutt played only nine games with the Revs, not scoring a goal and assisting on only one. On April 1, 2002, the Revolution announced that it would not exercise the option on midfielder Yari Allnutt's contract for the 2002 MLS season. He rejoined the Rhinos for the 2004 season and retired at the end of it.

== See also ==
- List of select Jewish football (association; soccer) players
