= Tim Hardy =

American soccer player

Personal information
- Date of birth: February 18, 1973 (age 53)
- Place of birth: United States
- Height: 6 ft 0 in (1.83 m)
- Position: Defender

Youth career
- 1992–1995: Indiana Hoosiers

Senior career*
Years	Team	Apps	(Gls)
1996	Richmond Kickers	23	(1)
1996–1997	St. Louis Ambush (indoor)	31	(5)
1998–2000	Rochester Rhinos	64	(2)
1998–2000	Buffalo Blizzard (indoor)	51	(9)
2000–2001	Cleveland Crunch (indoor)	7	(0)
Total		176	(16)
- * Club domestic league appearances and goals

Tim Hardy is an American retired soccer defender who played professionally in the USL A-League and National Professional Soccer League.

Hardy graduated from LaSalle High School where he was an All State soccer player. He attended Indiana University, where he played on the men's soccer team from 1992 to 1995. In 1996, Hardy turned professional with the Richmond Kickers of the USISL Select League. In the fall of 1996, Hardy moved indoors with the St. Louis Ambush of the National Professional Soccer League. In 1998, Hardy signed with the Rochester Rhinos, playing for them for three seasons. In addition to playing outdoors with the Rhinos, Hardy also spent the winters with the Buffalo Blizzard of the NPSL. He finished his career with the Cleveland Crunch during the 2000–2001 NPSL season.
