= Scott Schweitzer =

American soccer player (born 1971)

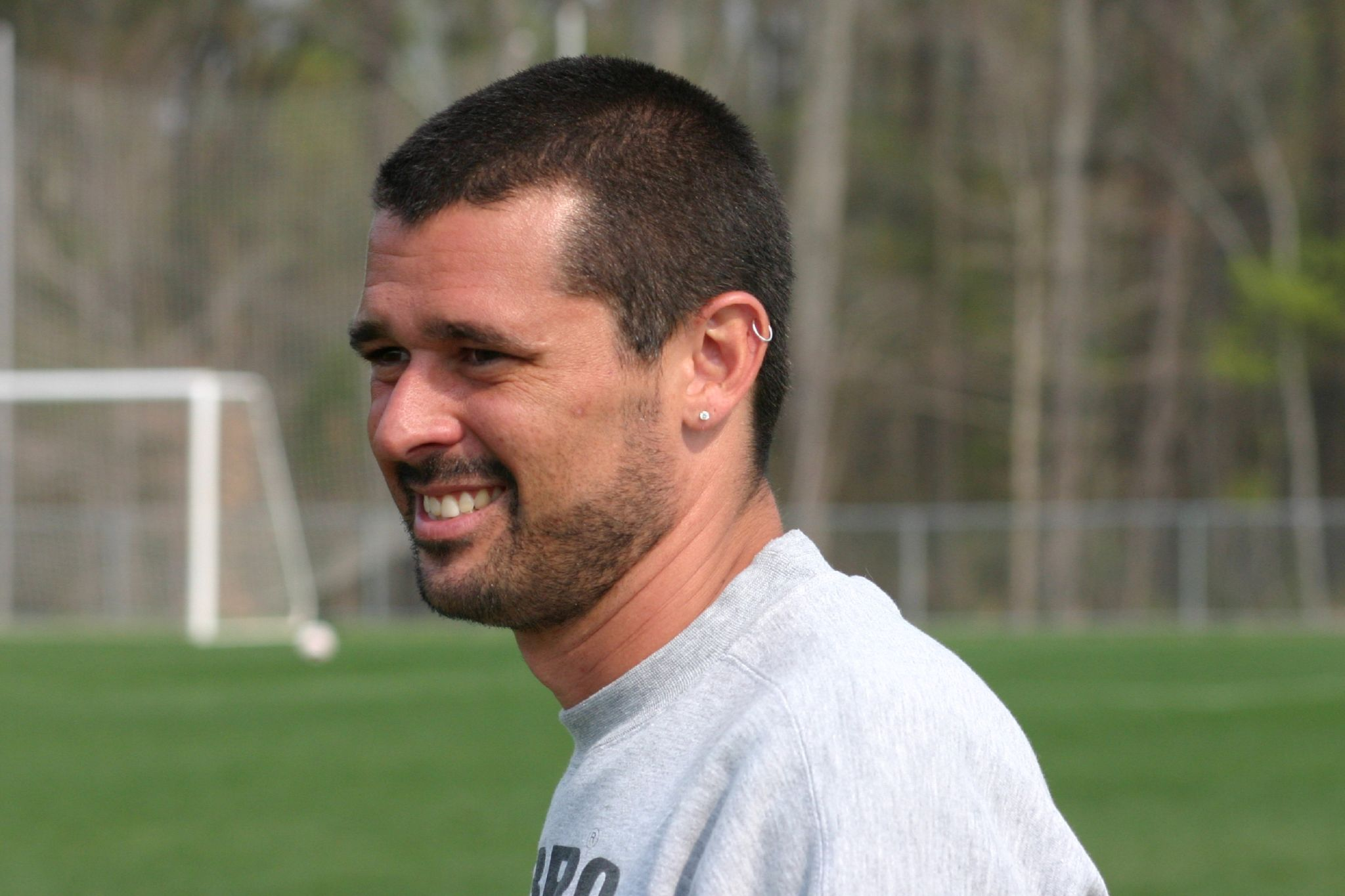

Personal information
- Date of birth: August 12, 1971 (age 55)
- Place of birth: Rahway, New Jersey, United States
- Position: Defender

Youth career
- 1985–1988: St. Benedict's Prep

College career
Years	Team	Apps	(Gls)
1989–1992	NC State Wolfpack		

Senior career*
Years	Team	Apps	(Gls)
1993	Raleigh Flyers		
1993	Brest		
1994	Guingamp		
1994–2001	Cleveland Crunch (indoor)	233	(66)
1995	Atlanta Ruckus		
1996–1997	Carolina Dynamo	36	(2)
1998–2003	Rochester Raging Rhinos	172	(2)
2004	Syracuse Salty Dogs	16	(0)
2004–2005	Baltimore Blast (indoor)	31	(8)
2005	Rochester Raging Rhinos		

Managerial career
- 2006: Raleigh Elite (assistant)
- 2007–2008: Carolina RailHawks
- * Club domestic league appearances and goals

Scott Schweitzer (born August 12, 1971) is an American soccer coach and former player. He spent two years as the head coach of Carolina RailHawks FC.

== College soccer ==
Schweitzer was born in Rahway, New Jersey. He was a four-year letter winner at N.C. State University. He was a two-time All-American (second team in 1991 and first team in 1992) and named Atlantic Coast Conference Player of the Year in 1992. He was a member of the Wolfpack team that made it to the 1990 NCAA Final Four. Schweitzer was also a member of the U.S. World University Games Team from 1992 to 1994. In 2002, he was selected to the ACC's 50th Anniversary men's soccer team.

== Professional career ==
Schweitzer began his professional career in France in 1993 and 1994, where he played for Stade Brestois 29 and En Avant Guingamp of the French Third Division. Upon his return from France, Schweitzer played for one season (1995) with the Atlanta Ruckus of the American Professional Soccer League (the forerunner to the A-League) before moving on to the Carolina Dynamo of the United Soccer Leagues in 1996. In 1997, Schweitzer was named to the USL-1 First Team.

Schweitzer moved to the Rochester Rhinos of USL-1 in 1998. During his time with the Rhinos, Schweitzer won three USL-1 championships (1998, 2000, 2001) and one U.S. Open Cup title (1999). On a personal level, he was named to the USL-1 First Team four times while with the Rhinos, and twice was named First Division Defender of the Year.

After six seasons with Rochester, Schweitzer left to join the rival Syracuse Salty Dogs in 2004. Following the suspension of the Syracuse franchise at the end of the season, Schweitzer followed Salty Dogs head coach Laurie Calloway back to Rochester, playing one final season with the Rhinos in 2005, when he served as team captain. After the season, the team named him to their all-time Rhinos squad in celebration of the franchise's tenth anniversary. Schweitzer retired from professional soccer at the end of the 2005 campaign.

== Indoor soccer ==
In addition to his outdoor play, Schweitzer was also a professional indoor soccer player. He played eight seasons for the Cleveland Crunch of the National Professional Soccer League (NPSL) (and later MISL). He was named to the NPSL All-Rookie Team in the 1994–95 and was also named the Crunch's Rookie of the Year. Schweitzer was a four-time NPSL All-Star, and won two league championships with the Crunch; in 1996 and 1999 where he scored the game-winning goal in what would prove to be the final NPSL championship game. In 2004–05, Schweitzer played one season with the Baltimore Blast of the MISL.

== Coaching career ==
After his retirement as a player, Schweitzer took a job as a full-time coach and director of Next Level Academy in Morrisville, North Carolina He also served as an assistant coach of the Raleigh Elite PDL squad for the 2006 season.

On October 11, 2006, Schweitzer was introduced as the first head coach of the Carolina RailHawks, a USL-1 expansion franchise that will start play in 2007. The RailHawks job is Schweitzer's first as a head coach of a professional soccer team. In October 2008, the RailHawks announced that Schweitzer would no longer continue as head coach. During his two years as coach of Carolina, he took the team to a 24–24–24.
