= Staten Island Vipers =

- Full name: Staten Island Vipers
- Nickname: Vipers
- Founded: 1998
- Dissolved: 1999
- Stadium: Tottenville High School; Huguenot, Staten Island; New York City, New York
- Capacity: 3,000
- Owner(s): (United States) Joe Manfredi
- Coach: (United States) Adrian Gaitan
- League: USL A-League
Home colors	Away colors

The Staten Island Vipers were a soccer club that competed in the USL A-League in 1998 and 1999. The club was based on Staten Island, New York City. The team played its games at Tottenville High School and Wagner College. The team dissolved following the 1999 season.

== History ==
The Vipers debuted in the USISL A-League in 1998, co-owned by Staten Island businessman and local soccer enthusiast Joe Manfredi and Roger Gorevic, who moved his New York Fever A-League franchise to Staten Island. The team was started up and managed initially by Tom Neale (General Manager) and Mike Winograd (Director of Youth and Team Development), who were college roommates and teammates at Lafayette College. Neale, former general manager of the New York Fever, went on to be general manager of the San Jose Earthquakes and COO of the New York Metrostars of MLS, and Winograd, a former professional soccer player in Kfar Saba, Israel and assistant coach at the University of Richmond, went on to law school at the University of Pennsylvania.

The Vipers initially struggled to find a ground at which to play, debuting first at Monsignor Farrell High School in Oakwood before being forced out by community opposition. The club would land at Tottenville High School in Huguenot after reaching an agreement to refurbish the school's field and bleachers and adding lights for night games, along with a commitment for the team to work with the school to develop a city soccer program. The club was coached by Adrian Gaitan.

The team colors were blue and white, with shirts sponsored by Toyota and the kit supplied by Umbro.

The team mascot was a costumed character in a green outfit called the "Hyper Viper." Among the Staten Islanders who donned the costume was Craig Perrino and Jay Akselrud, who also entertained at Staten Island Yankees games.

The club averaged an attendance of over 1,500 fans per game and finished their first season in 1998 with a 15–11–1–1 (W-L-SOW-SOL) record, placing third in the Northeast Division but losing the Conference Quarterfinal. The team improved their record to 19–9–2–1 in 1999, finishing 2nd in the division and advancing to the Conference Semifinal but eventually losing to the Hershey Wildcats.

== Year-by-year ==
Year	Division	League	Reg. season	Playoffs	Open Cup
1998	2	USISL A-League	3rd, Northeast	Conference Quarterfinals	Did not qualify
1999	2	USL A-League	2nd, Northeast	Conference Semifinals	Quarterfinals

== See also ==
- New York Centaurs/New York Fever
- New York Red Bulls
- New York Cosmos
- Long Island Academy
