= Darren Tilley =

English footballer (born 1967)

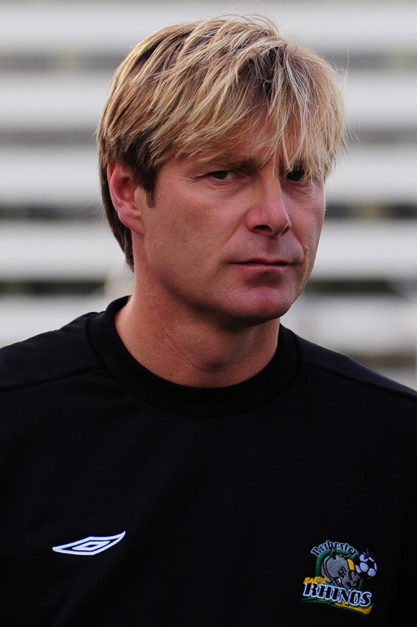

Personal information
- Full name: Darren John Tilley
- Date of birth: 15 March 1967 (age 59)
- Place of birth: Keynsham, Somerset, England
- Position: Forward

Senior career*
Years	Team	Apps	(Gls)
1983–1984	Bristol Rovers	0	(0)
1986–1988	Bath City	28	(11)
1991	Kitchener Kickers	17	(3)
1991–1993	York City	21	(0)
1994	Happy Valley AA		
1994	Guangdong Hongyuan	13	(3)
1995	Frankwell F.C.		
1996	Foshan Fosti F.C.		
1997	Toronto Lynx	18	(6)
1997	Montreal Impact	9	(7)
1998–2000	Rochester Rhinos	54	(26)
2000	Montreal Impact	7	(0)
2000–2001	Vancouver 86ers	34	(14)
2002	Mississauga Olympians	19	(20)

Managerial career
- 2002: Mississauga Olympians
- 2008–2009: Rochester Rhinos
- 2023–: Burlington SC
- * Club domestic league appearances and goals

Darren Tilley (born 15 March 1967) is an English football coach and former player. He is currently the head coach for Burlington SC.

== Playing career ==
=== York City ===
Tilley was born in Keynsham, Somerset. He played for York City in the Football League Third Division from 1991 to 1993.

They finished in fourth position in the 22-team 1992–93 Football League Third Division, qualifying for the playoffs. They were successful in the final, beating Crewe Alexandra in a penalty shoot-out to gain promotion to the Football League Second Division.

=== Asia ===
Before arriving in North America, spent time playing in Hong Kong and China In 1994 he played for the Happy Valley Football Club in the Hong Kong First Division and led the team in scoring. Tilley then moved to the Chinese Pro League and made history becoming the first European to play and score in a Chinese Professional League match with Guangdong Hongyuan Football Club. In 1995 he played for the Frankwell Football Club in the Hong Kong First Division and led the team in scoring. In 1996 he transferred to Foshan Fosti FC and was named the team MVP.

=== North America ===
In 1997, he started the season with the Toronto Lynx. He recorded 18 points (6+4) in 18 games before being traded to Montreal Impact. He ended the '97 campaign ninth in the league in scoring with 32 points (13+6). He earned Second Team A-League All-Star honors. He also represented the club at the 1997 A-League All-Star Game winning the MVP of the game. He was a head coach and instructor for the Cambridge United Soccer Club for 8 years and trained many different kids from aged 9+.

=== Rochester Raging Rhinos ===
Tilley played from 1998 to 2000. He was one of the catalysts in helping the franchise win an A-League title (1998) and a U.S. Open Cup championship (1999). During his career in Rochester, he played in 54 regular season matches and recorded 26 goals and 12 assists for 64 points. His best season was during the team's magical run in 1998, when the Rhinos finished the season with a 24-4-0 record and captured their first league championship. That season, Tilley was named to the All A-League Team as he finished second in league scoring with 21 goals and seven assists in 24 games. More importantly, he was named the MVP of the A-League Championship Game as the striker connected three times to lead the Rhinos to a 3-1 win over Minnesota. He set an A-League record with 18 postseason points (7+4). Despite playing only two full seasons with the Rhinos, his name appears numerous times in the franchise's record book. In Rhinos history, Tilley still ranks fifth in goals (26), fifth in points (64) and is tied for seventh in assists (12). In postseason history, he is first all-time in goals (10), assists (6) and points (26). If that wasn't enough, Tilley also remains third in points (7) and tied for third in goals (3) in Rhinos' U.S. Open Cup history.

After his stint in Rochester, Tilley joined the Vancouver 86ers/Whitecaps organization for the 2000 and 2001 seasons. In 2000, he was the team's MVP and top scorer and in 2001 he led the team in playoff scoring.

Tilley was the CSL Golden Boot winner in 2002 playing for Canadian club Mississauga Olympians. He retired following the 2003 season.

== Managerial career ==
His first coaching experience was in 2002 by becoming the player/head coach for the Mississauga Olympians in the Canadian Professional Soccer League.

On 26 March 2008, the Rochester Rhinos hired Tilley as the team's coach on a two-year contract. During the 2008 season Tilley led the Rhinos into the playoffs by finishing fourth in the standings. In the club's playoff run the Rhinos defeated the Charleston Battery in the quarterfinals to advance to the semifinals. There the Rhinos were defeated by the Puerto Rico Islanders on a 3–2 aggregate on goals. The following season Tilley led the Rhinos to a sixth-place finish in the standings enough to clinch a playoff spot. In the postseason the Rhinos were eliminated in the quarterfinals by the Islanders once again on a 5–3 aggregate on goals. In U.S. Open Cup play 2008 the Rhinos reached the Third Round losing to eventual D.C. United 2-0. In 2009 they made it to the Semi-Final losing to eventual runners-up D.C. United 2–1.

On 28 September 2009, Rochester announced that the organization would not be renewing his contract for the 2010 season. In 2023, he served as the head coach for Burlington SC.
