= San Diego Flash =

Former men's soccer club in San Diego, California

- Full name: San Diego Flash
- Nickname: SD Flash
- Founded: 2010; 16 years ago
- Dissolved: 2018; 8 years ago
- Stadium: Mira Mesa High School Stadium; San Diego, California
- Capacity: 3,000
- Owners: Clenton A. Alexander; Warren Barton
- Head coach: Jerome Watson
- League: National Premier Soccer League
- 2015: 1st, West-Southern Conference
Home colors	Away colors

The San Diego Flash were an amateur men's soccer team based in San Diego, California. Founded in 2010 as a phoenix club of the former San Diego Flash, it entered the National Premier Soccer League (NPSL) in 2011, and most recently played in the Southern Conference of its West Division. The Flash dissolved before the 2018 NPSL season, dissolving with the passing of the team owner.

== History ==
=== Foundation ===
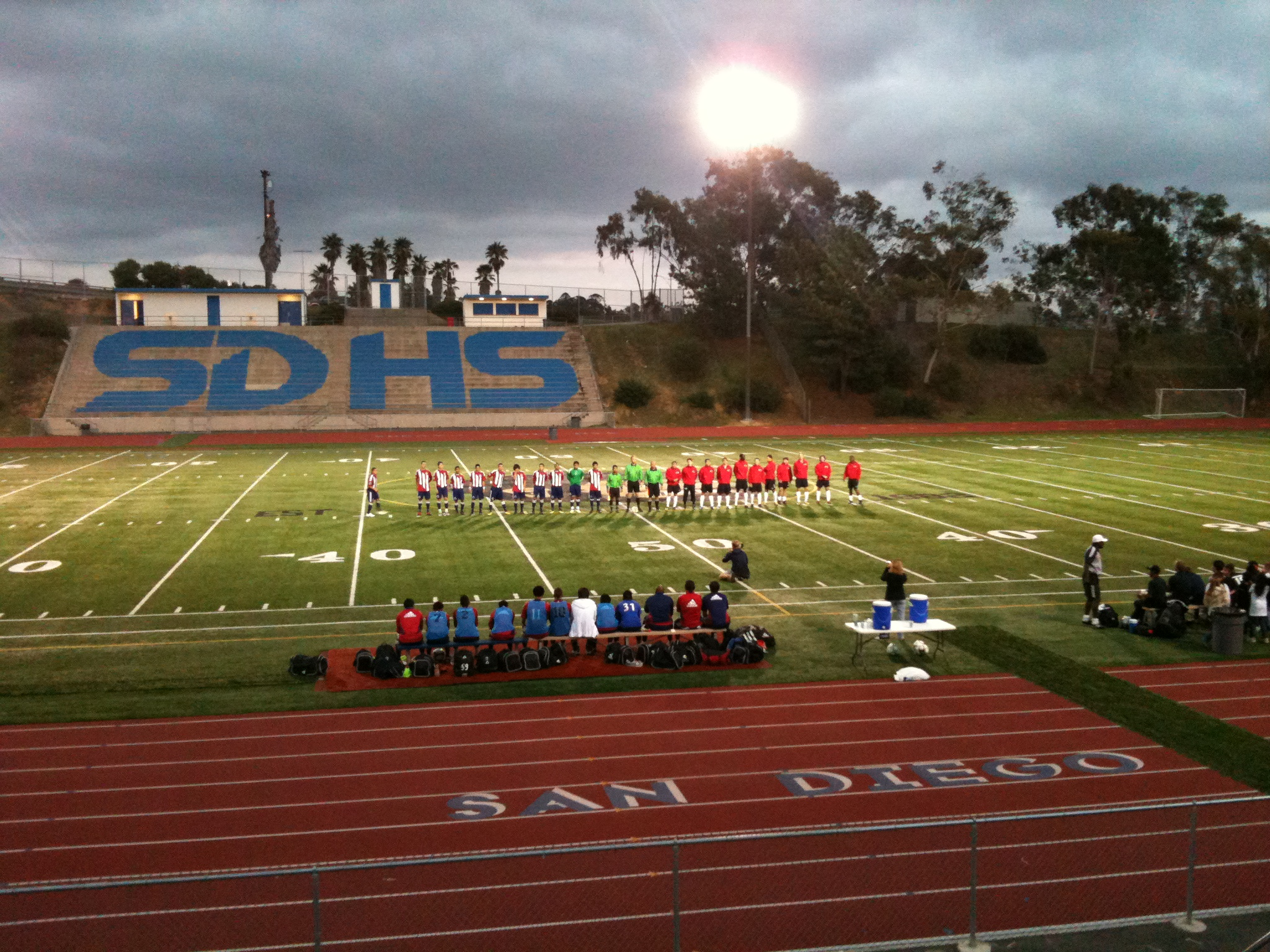
Final exhibition of 2010 at Balboa stadium v Chivas USA

The club was founded in 2010 by San Diego Soccer Partners, Inc., which is headed by the former San Diego Flash's part owner Clenton A. Alexander, former English Premier League footballer and Fox Soccer Channel analyst Warren Barton, former US national team striker Eric Wynalda, and former San Diego Boca FC General Manager Travis Chesney. The team played exhibition matches in 2010 with the goal of returning to league play in 2011 in a league below Major League Soccer with Barton as head coach. In November 2010, during their final exhibition season game, the club announced that they would be returning to competitive league play in 2011 in the National Premier Soccer League, and that the team was being sponsored by Umbro. In January 2011 it was revealed that the team would be playing in the revived Southwest Division of the NPSL and the team would be playing their home games at the football/soccer stadium on the campus of Westview High School on the north side of San Diego. The move from their exhibition location in downtown San Diego was the decision of Flash Soccer CEO; Clent Alexander, for the team to play in a more modern facility.

=== Competitive play ===
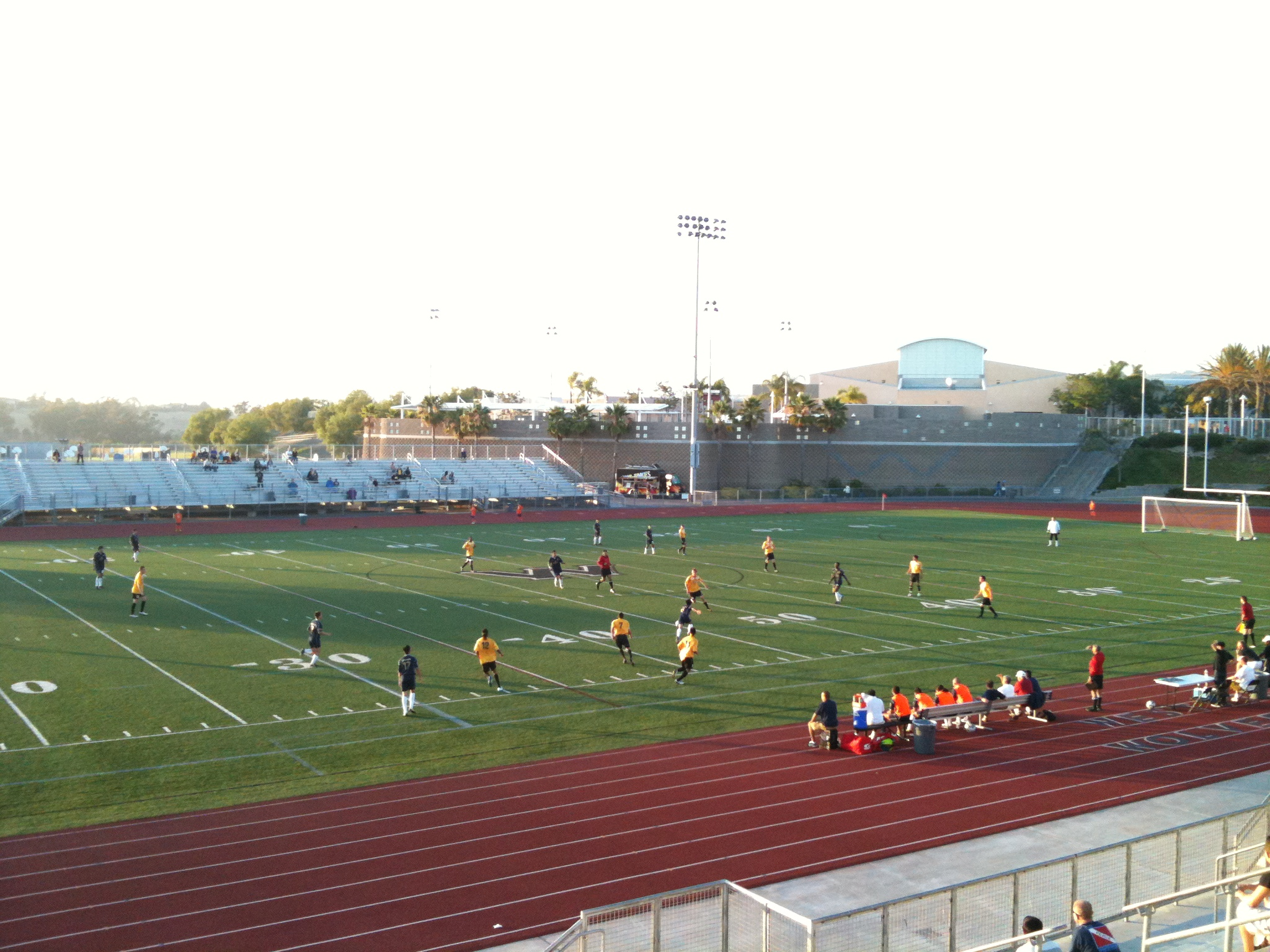
2011 playoff match between Sacramento and SD Flash at Westview High School Stadium

The Flash had a successful first season in the National Premier Soccer League going 12–1–1 on the field (10–3–1 officially due to two forced forfeits on technicalities). Their record was good enough to place first in the NPSL Southwest Division and home field for the first round of the 2011 playoffs. The Flash however were unable to defeat the defending NPSL champion Sacramento Gold in the first round of the playoffs losing 2–1.

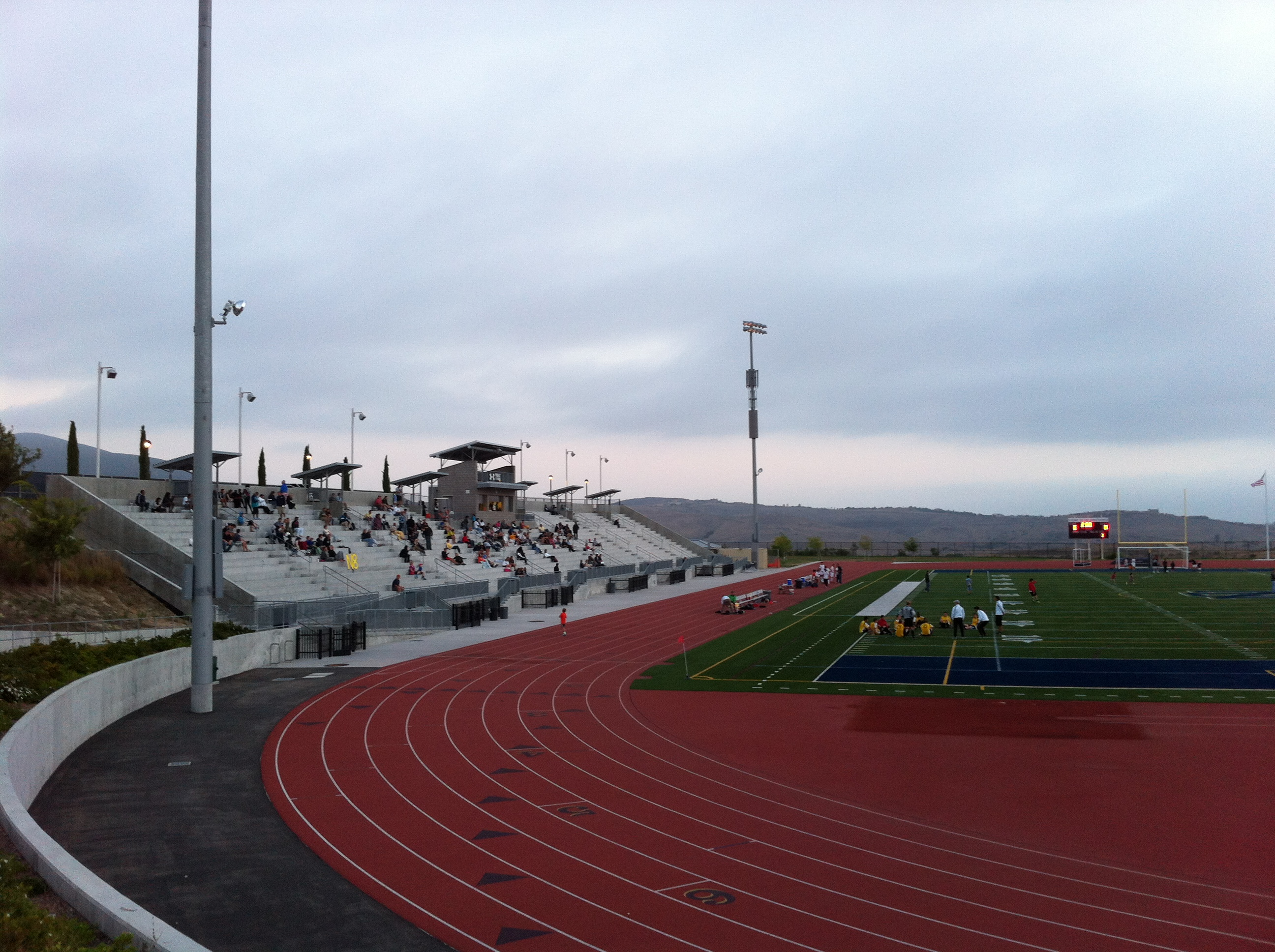
Home of the Flash at Del Norte High School Stadium (2012–13)

The 2012 season did start on a somewhat sour note for the Flash having been eliminated from the US Open Cup by their crosstown rival San Diego Boca FC. However, the Flash's second campaign in the NPSL ended up proving just as successful as the first with the team going 11–2–1 with a 13-game unbeaten streak, including having gone unbeaten at home, that was not ended until the last game of the season. For their second NPSL year the team moved from Westview High School to the stadium at Del Norte High School near Poway. The Flash developed several players over the course of the season who earned trials with the San Jose Earthquakes of Major League Soccer. Near the end of the season the team itself enjoyed its two largest home crowds to that point and also began exploring the possibility of moving to the Division 2 North American Soccer League with Alexander presenting a letter to and meeting with the NASL. The team did suffer from a second consecutive early exit from the playoffs in the divisional semi-final losing to the Sonoma County Sol on penalty kicks 5–3 after the game ending in a 2–2 draw.

2013 began for the Flash with the departure of coach Warren Barton and his replacement by Jerome Watson.

== Stadiums ==
- Balboa Stadium; San Diego, California (2010)
- Stadium at Westview High School; San Diego, California (2011)
- Stadium at Del Norte High School; San Diego, California (2012–2013)
- Stadium at Mira Mesa High School; San Diego, California (2014–present)

== Rivalries ==
The San Diego Derby is an annual contest that developed between the San Diego Flash and their crosstown rivals San Diego Boca FC. The derby was first contested between the two teams on the Flash's entry into the National Premier Soccer League in 2011. The rivalry however has its roots in the management of the A-League edition of the San Diego Flash that ceased play in 2001 with both the Flash ownership and the SD Boca ownership group having come from fractious portions of the A-League Flash's ownership. The Derby ended with the folding of the Boca franchise after the 2013 season.

== Players ==
As of July 18, 2012

Note: Flags indicate national team as defined under FIFA eligibility rules; some limited exceptions apply. Players may hold more than one non-FIFA nationality.

No.	Pos.	Nation	Player
1	GK	USA	Nicolas Harpel (vice-captain)
2	MF	USA	Joe Shah
3	DF	USA	Nate Leboffe
4	DF	USA	Conor Hearn
5	DF	ARG	Lucas Carlsson
6	DF	USA	Justin Picou
7	MF	USA	Nelson Pizarro (captain)
8	MF	USA	Andy Ortega
9	FW	SSD	Duach Jock
10	FW	COD	Larry Emeanua
11	F	USA	Travis Murray
12	MF	SSD	Ladule Lako LoSarah

No.	Pos.	Nation	Player
14	FW	USA	Miguel Gomez
15	MF	USA	Adrian Dubois
16	MF	USA	David Bakal
17	DF	USA	Jeffrey Praino-Miller
18	MF	USA	Jon Sawyer
19	MF	FRA	Tarek Rachdi
20	DF	USA	Tim Roty
21	DF	USA	Brian Lewis
22	MF	USA	Brandon Zuniga
23	MF	USA	Sergio Valle Ortiz
24	MF	USA	Ralph Pace
26	DF	USA	Gaylen Greenwalt
28	DF	USA	Peter Wood
37	FW	MEX	Christian Diego Gonzalez

=== Notable former players ===
- (United States) Ryan Guy

== Head coaches ==
- (England) Warren Barton (2010–2012)
- (United States) Jerome Watson (2013)

== Seasons ==
Year	Division	League	Reg. season	Playoffs	Open Cup
2011	4	NPSL	1st, West-Southern	Division Semi-finals	Did not qualify
2012	4	NPSL	1st, West-Southern	Division Semi-finals	Did not qualify
2013	4	NPSL	2nd, West-Southern	Conference Final	Did not qualify
2014	4	NPSL	3rd, West-Southern	Conference Playoff	Did not qualify
2015	4	NPSL	1st, West-Southern	Division Semi-finals	Did not qualify
