= 1998 New England Revolution season =

New England Revolution
1998 season
- Owner: Robert Kraft (The Kraft Group)
- Head coach: Thomas Rongen (until August 24); Walter Zenga (from August 24, player/coach from October 28)
- Stadium: Foxboro Stadium; Foxborough, Massachusetts
- MLS: Conference: 6th Overall: 12th
- Top goalscorer: League: Raul Diaz Arce (18G); All: Raul Diaz Arce (18G)
- Highest home attendance: 35,462
- Lowest home attendance: 13,074
- Average home league attendance: 19,188
- Biggest win: 3–0 (v. Miami April 25th)
- Biggest defeat: 6–1 (v. Columbus August 8th)

The 1998 New England Revolution season was the third season for the New England Revolution both as a club and in Major League Soccer (MLS). As the club did not participate in the 1998 U.S. Open Cup, and did not qualify for the MLS Cup Playoffs, they participated only in the MLS regular season.

== Summary ==
After qualifying for the playoffs for the first time in club history in 1997, the Revolution entered the season with a "vastly improved" roster preparing for 1998; adding Richard Goulooze from SC Cambuur, U.S. international Janusz Michallik, and then completing the first three-team trade in league history to land 1997 MLS All-star and El Salvadorian international striker Raul Diaz Arce from D.C. United (infuriating D.C. United fans in the process). The move would also see original league-allocation see Alexi Lalas depart the club.

Regardless of these moves, the Revolution struggled through much of the season; losing their first three matches out of the gate, and recording a 9-match winless streak throughout the months of May and June. Additionally contributing to on-field issues was the absence of head coach Thomas Rongen, and players Joe-Max Moore and Mike Burns, who all missed substantial time at the 1998 FIFA World Cup. Following heavy defeats to the Columbus Crew (6-1) and LA Galaxy (5-1) Thomas Rongen was fired on August 24. When asked about his struggles in New England, Rongen referenced "cancers" in the locker room that undermined team performance in 1998, and stated "a lot of things happened behind the scenes that I didn't know about until it was too late," adding that "there were different factions where players didn't know who to trust anymore. Walter Zenga would take over as Revolution manager for the remainder of the season, concluding with a 3-3 to record down the stretch.

== Transfers ==
=== Transfers In ===
New England Revolution – 1998 Transfers In
Date	Name	Fee	Position	Previous club
January 26, 1998	Janusz Michallik	???	DEF	(United States) Columbus Crew
January 26, 1998	Richard Goulooze	Undisclosed	DEF	(Netherlands) SC Cambuur
February 3, 1998	Carlos Rocha	Undisclosed	FW	(United States) Rhode Island Stingrays
February 5, 1998	Raul Diaz Arce	Trade	FW	(United States) D.C. United
February 23, 1998	Edwin Gorter	Undisclosed	MF	(Netherlands) NAC Breda
February 25, 1998	Jamar Beasley	League Allocation	FW	(United States) MLS Project 40
February 26, 1998	David Nakhid	Undisclosed	MF	(Lebanon) Al Ansar FC
March 24, 1998	Ian Feuer	Undisclosed	GK	(England) Luton Town F.C.
April 8, 1998	Jair	Undisclosed	MF	(Bulgaria) PFC CSKA Sofia
May 21, 1998	Manny Motajo	"Signed"	DF	(United States) Jacksonville Cyclones
May 21, 1998	Tom McLaughlin	1998 MLS College Draft	FW	(United States) Harvard Crimson
May 26, 1998	Oscar Pareja	League Allocation	MF	(Colombia) Deportivo Cali
August 15, 1998	Damian	Trade	FW	(United States) Dallas Burn
November 2, 1998	Shawn Medved	MLS Waiver Draft	MF	(United States) San Jose Clash
November 2, 1998	Kris Kelderman	MLS Waiver Draft	MF	(United States) Miami Fusion

=== Draft results ===
==== College draft ====
On January 31, 1998, the Revolution drafted Johnny Torres, Jesse Van Saun, Kevin Coye, and Tom McLaughlin in the 1998 MLS College Draft.

New England Revolution – 1998 MLS College Draft
Round	Overall	Name	Position	Previous club
1	5	(United States) Johnny Torres	M	(United States) Creighton University
2	17	(United States) Jesse Van Saun	M	(United States) St. John's University
3	29	(United States) Kevin Coye	D	(United States) UCLA
3	36	(United States) Tom McLaughlin	F	(United States) Harvard University

==== Supplemental draft ====
On February 1, 1998, the Revolution drafted Dahir Mohammed, Doug Neely, and Dave Salzwedel in the MLS Supplemental Draft.

Additionally, the Dallas Burn drafted Revolution player Darren Sawatzky in the 3rd round as the 34th overall pick.

New England Revolution – 1998 MLS Supplemental Draft
Round	Overall	Name	Position	Previous club
1	5	(Ethiopia) Dahir Mohammed	D	(United States) C.W. Post College, Long Island Rough Riders
2	17	(United States) Doug Neely	M	(United States) Chapman University, Anaheim Splash
3	29	(United States) Dave Salzwedel	GK	(United States) Cal Lutheran, San Jose Clash

=== Transfers Out ===
New England Revolution – 1998 Transfers Out
Date	Name	Left Via	Position	Destination Club
January 15, 1998	Walter Zenga	Retirement	GK	N/A
February 5, 1998	Alexi Lalas	Trade	DF	(United States) NY/NJ MetroStars
February 17, 1998	Steve Klein	Waived	FW	(United States) Nashville Metros
February 17, 1998	Dave Salzwedel	Released	GK	N/A
May 28, 1998	Rob Jachym	Released	FW	(United States) Worcester Wildfire
June 3, 1998	Evans Wise	Waived	MF	(United States) Tampa Bay Mutiny
June 8, 1998	Kevin Coye	Waived	DF	(United States) Orange County Zodiac
June 29, 1998	Tom McLaughlin	Waived	FW	(United States) Worcester Wildfire
August 15, 1998	Oscar Pareja	Trade	MF	(United States) Dallas Burn
October 31, 1998	Janusz Michallik	Waived	DF	N/A
October 31, 1998	Dahir Mohammed	Waived	DF	(United States) Staten Island Vipers
October 31, 1998	David Nakhid	Waived	MF	(Sweden) Malmö FF

1. On February 5, 1998, New England acquired striker Raul Diaz Arce from D.C. United in exchange for Defender Alexi Lalas and a second-round pick in the 1999 MLS College Draft, which were then traded to the New York/New Jersey MetroStars, with the MetroStars’ second-round pick in the 1999 MLS College Draft and future considerations sent to D.C. United along with New England’s first-round pick in the 1999 MLS College Draft.
2. On August 15, 1998, the Revolution acquired forward Damian from the Dallas Burn in exchange for midfielder Oscar Pareja.

== Club ==
=== Team management ===
Position	Staff
General Manager	(Republic of Ireland) Brian O'Donovan
Head Coach	(Netherlands) Thomas Rongen
Assistant Coach	(United States) Renato Capobianco
Assistant Coach	(United States) Richard Williams
Head Coach	(Italy) Walter Zenga
Assistant Coach	(United States) Sid Mazzola

3. On August 24, 1998 The Revolution announced the resignation of head coach Thomas Rongen, as well as assistant coaches Renato Capobianco and Richard Williams. The same day, The Revolution named Walter Zenga head coach, and Sid Mazzola assistant coach.

=== Roster ===
Adapted from 2024 New England Revolution Media Guide (pg. 309)

Note: Flags indicate national team as defined under FIFA eligibility rules; some limited exceptions apply. Players may hold more than one non-FIFA nationality.

No.	Pos.	Nation	Player
21	FW	ESA	Raúl Díaz Arce
9	FW	USA	Joe-Max Moore
10	MF	NED	Edwin Gorter
8	MF	USA	Imad Baba
11	FW	MEX	Damián Álvarez
14	MF	RSA	Ivan McKinley
16	MF	CPV	Jair
5	DF	USA	Ted Chronopoulos
20	FW	COL	Johnny Torres
4	DF	USA	Mike Burns
18	FW	IRL	Paul Keegan
7	DF	NED	Richard Goulooze
11	MF	COL	Óscar Pareja

No.	Pos.	Nation	Player
24	DF	NGR	Manny Motajo
17	FW	USA	Jamar Beasley
33	FW	POR	Carlos Rocha
11	MF	TTO	Evans Wise
26	GK	USA	Jeff Causey
2	DF	USA	Brian Dunseth
1	GK	USA	Ian Feuer
25	FW	USA	Tom McLaughlin
3	MF	USA	Janusz Michallik
6	DF	USA	Dahir Mohammed
12	MF	TTO	David Nakhid
19	FW	USA	Jesse Van Saun
15	DF	USA	Kevin Coye
23	FW	POL	Rob Jachym

== Honors ==
Adopted from 2024 Revolution Media Guide (pg. 324 - 328)

New England Revolution – 1998 League and Team Awards
Award	Recipient(s)
MLS All-Stars	Mike Burns, Raul Diaz Arce
Revolution Most Valuable Player	Joe-Max Moore
Revolution Defender of the Year	Mike Burns
Revolution Scoring Champion	Raul Diaz Arce

New England Revolution – 1998 Statistical Leaders
Category	Recipient(s)	Figures
Games played	Raul Diaz Arce	32
Games Started	Raul Diaz Arce	32
Minutes played	Raul Diaz Arce	2,878
Goals scored	Raul Diaz Arce	18
Assists	Joe-Max Moore	15
Shots	Raul Diaz Arce	90
Shots on Goal	Raul Diaz Arce	51

== Competitive ==
=== Major League Soccer ===
==== Conference standings ====
Pos	Team	Pld	W	SOW	L	GF	GA	GD	Pts	Qualification
1	D.C. United	32	17	7	8	74	48	+26	58	Qualification for the conference semifinals
2	Columbus Crew	32	15	0	17	67	56	+11	45	Qualification for the conference semifinals
3	MetroStars	32	12	3	17	54	63	−9	39	Qualification for the conference semifinals
4	Miami Fusion	32	10	5	17	46	68	−22	35	Qualification for the conference semifinals
5	Tampa Bay Mutiny	32	11	1	20	46	57	−11	34	
6	New England Revolution	32	9	2	21	53	66	−13	29	

Source: MLS

==== Overall standings ====
Pos	Team	Pld	W	SOW	L	GF	GA	GD	Pts	
1	Los Angeles Galaxy (S)	32	22	2	8	85	44	+41	68	Qualification for the CONCACAF Champions' Cup
2	D.C. United	32	17	7	8	74	48	+26	58	Qualification for the CONCACAF Champions' Cup
3	Chicago Fire (C)	32	18	2	12	62	45	+17	56	Qualification for the CONCACAF Champions' Cup
4	Columbus Crew	32	15	0	17	67	56	+11	45	
5	Colorado Rapids	32	14	2	16	62	69	−7	44	
6	MetroStars	32	12	3	17	54	63	−9	39	
7	Dallas Burn	32	11	4	17	43	59	−16	37	
8	Miami Fusion	32	10	5	17	46	68	−22	35	
9	Tampa Bay Mutiny	32	11	1	20	46	57	−11	34	
10	San Jose Clash	32	10	3	19	48	60	−12	33	
11	Kansas City Wizards	32	10	2	20	45	50	−5	32	
12	New England Revolution	32	9	2	21	53	66	−13	29	

Source: MLS
Rules for classification: 1) points; 2) head-to-head record; 3) goal difference; 4) number of goals scored
(C) MLS Cup champions; (S) Supporters' Shield winners

=== Non-competitive ===
Facing financial difficulties ($100 million in debt) S.L. Benfica embarked on a U.S. tour in 1998. As part of this tour, Benfica played a friendly against the Revolution on June 11, 1998. It was Benfica's first match at Foxboro Stadium since 1972. The match marked Oscar Pareja's Revolution debut, and outdrew several 1998 World Cup matches.

June 11, 1998	New England Revolution	1-2	S.L. Benfica	Foxborough, Massachusetts
	Carlos Rocha 53'	Report	Erwin Sanchez 78' 87'	Stadium: Foxboro Stadium; Attendance: 35,136; Referee: Alberto Giordano

=== MLS Regular season ===
March 29, 1998 1	DC United	1–1	New England Revolution	Washington DC
	John Harkes (yellow card) 12'; Geoff Aunger (yellow card) 20'; Marco Etcheverry (yellow card) 64'; Brian Kamler 88'	Report	Imad Baba (yellow card) 52' (goal) 54'	Stadium: RFK Stadium; Attendance: 22,263; Referee: Noel Kenny; Assistant referees: George Vergara, Lorenzo Sanz; Fourth official: Kenneth Kapla

April 4, 1998 2	Miami Fusion	2–1	New England Revolution	Fort Fort Lauderdale, Florida
	Carlos Valderrama (red card); Jerry Tamashiro 27'; Wade Webber (yellow card) 45'; Diego Serna (yellow card) 77'	Report	Raúl Díaz Arce 31'	Stadium: Lockhart Stadium; Attendance: 11,132; Referee: Ted Covaciu

April 11, 1998 3	Columbus Crew	3–2	New England Revolution	Columbus, Ohio
	Robert Warzycha 9'; Jason Farrell 57'; Brian McBride 89'	Report	Evans Wise (yellow card) 32'; Ivan McKinley (yellow card) 53'; David Nakhid (yellow card) 67'; Raúl Díaz Arce 68'; & Richard Goulooze (red card): Paul Keegan 89'	Stadium: Ohio Stadium; Attendance: 10,121; Referee: Richard Heron

April 18, 1998 4	New England Revolution	1–1 (3–2 p)	D.C. United	Foxborough, Massachusetts
	Jair 40'	Report	Marco Etcheverry 33'; Geoff Aunger (yellow card) 59'; Eddie Pope (yellow card) 80'	Stadium: Foxboro Stadium; Attendance: 24,133; Referee: Kevin Stott

April 25, 1998 5	New England Revolution	3–0	Miami Fusion	Foxborough, Massachusetts
	Brian Dunseth (yellow card) 10'; Joe-Max Moore 25'; Johnny Torres 33'	Report	Nelson Vargas (yellow card) 40'; Cle Kooiman (yellow card) 65'	Stadium: Foxboro Stadium; Attendance: 15,326; Referee: Alex Prus

May 3, 1998 6	San Jose Clash	1–3	New England Revolution	Kansas City, Missouri
	Wade Barrett 36'; Oscar Draguicevich (yellow card) 39'	Report	Imad Baba 21'; Richard Goulooze 41'; Mike Burns (yellow card) 59'; Edwin Gorter 63'	Stadium: Arrowhead Stadium; Attendance: 13,563; Referee: Paul Tamberino

May 10, 1998 7	New England Revolution	4–3	Tampa Bay Mutiny	Foxborough, Massachusetts
	Edwin Gorter 32' (yellow card) 43'; Raúl Díaz Arce 50' (yellow card) 51' (goal) 71'; Imad Baba 89'	Report	Musa Shannon 26' (yellow card) 27' (goal) 70'; Josh Keller (yellow card) 90'	Stadium: Foxboro Stadium; Attendance: 14,723; Referee: Ruben Rodhas

May 13, 1998 8	D.C. United	3–2	New England Revolution	Washington, D.C.
	Ben Olsen 16'; Tony Sanneh 46'; Roy Lassiter 55'	Report	Jair 50'; Ted Chronopoulos 51'	Stadium: Robert F. Kennedy Memorial Stadium; Attendance: 14,442; Referee: Michael Kennedy

May 16, 1998 9	New England Revolution	1–3	Kansas City Wizards	Foxborough, Massachusetts
	Ivan McKinley (red card); Raúl Díaz Arce 83'	Report	Vitalis Takawira 76' 79' 85'; Paul Wright (yellow card) 85'; Paul Rideout (yellow card) 89'	Stadium: Foxboro Stadium; Attendance: 20,613; Referee: Esse Baharmast

May 22, 1998 10	New England Revolution	0–2	Columbus Crew	Foxborough, Massachusetts
	Ted Chronopoulos (yellow card) 71'	Report	Jeff Cunningham 35'; Robert Warzycha 48'; Andrew Gregor (yellow card) 83'	Stadium: Foxboro Stadium; Attendance: 14,302; Referee: Noel Kenny

May 31, 1998 11	New England Revolution	1–1 (2–3 p)	MetroStars	Foxborough, Massachusetts
	Edwin Gorter (yellow card) 9'; Ivan McKinley (red card); Dahir Mohammed (yellow card) 74'; Raúl Díaz Arce 84'	Report	Giovanni Savarese (penalty missed); Brian Kelly 69'; Alexi Lalas (yellow card) 74'	Stadium: Foxboro Stadium; Referee: 18,692

June 7, 1998 12	LA Galaxy	5–1	New England Revolution	Pasadena, California
	Wélton 38'; Mauricio Cienfuegos 59'; Ezra Hendrickson 65' 72'; Greg Vanney 68'; Wellington Sanchez (yellow card) 74'	Report	Johnny Torres 1'; Manny Motajo (yellow card) 20' (red card); Richard Goulooze (yellow card) 30'; Brian Dunseth (yellow card) 49'; Ted Chronopoulos (yellow card) 57'	Stadium: Rose Bowl; Attendance: 38,383; Referee: Ricardo Valenzuela

June 14, 1998 13	New England Revolution	1–3	Chicago Fire	Foxborough, Massachusetts
	Imad Baba (yellow card) 24'; Raúl Díaz Arce 39'; Dahir Mohammed (yellow card) 58'; Ivan McKinley (yellow card) 58'	Report	Jerzy Podbrozny 25' 85'; Ritchie Kotschau (yellow card) 51' (goal) 60'	Stadium: Foxboro Stadium; Attendance: 17,054; Referee: Tim Weyland

June 24, 1998 14	MetroStars	5–3	New England Revolution	East Rutherford, New Jersey
	Brian Kelly 40' 53'; Giovanni Savarese 43'; Diego Soñora (penalty missed); Mike Petke 69'; Paul Dougherty 88'	Report	Raúl Díaz Arce 31' 68'; Ted Chronopoulos (yellow card) 56'; Edwin Gorter 64'	Stadium: Giants Stadium; Attendance: 10,310; Referee: Refugio Ramirez

June 27, 1998 15	New England Revolution	3–3 (2–4 p)	Dallas Burn	Foxborough, Massachusetts
	Raúl Díaz Arce 6'; Ted Eck (o.g.); Edwin Gorter 28'	Report	Jason Kreis 19'; Damián Álvarez 44'; Ted Eck 65' (yellow card) 82'	Stadium: Foxboro Stadium; Attendance: 18,206; Referee: Ruben Rodhas

July 1, 1998 16	Kansas City Wizards	0–1	New England Revolution	Kansas City, Missouri
	Preki 66'	Report	Manny Motajo (yellow card) 54'; Mike Burns (yellow card) 68'; Joe-Max Moore (yellow card) 90'	Stadium: Arrowhead Stadium; Referee: Marcel Yonan

July 4, 1998 17	Tampa Bay Mutiny	2–3	New England Revolution	Tampa, Florida
	Roy Wegerle (yellow card) 13'; Paul Dougherty (yellow card) 40'; Mauricio Ramos 60'; Chris Houser (yellow card) 74'; Thomas Ravelli (red card); Frankie Hejduk 81'	Report	Ted Chronopoulos (yellow card) 33'; Óscar Pareja (yellow card) 38'; Ivan McKinley 53'; Raúl Díaz Arce (yellow card) 62' (goal) 75' 84'; Edwin Gorter (yellow card) 79'; Jeff Causey (yellow card) 85'; Imad Baba (red card)	Stadium: Houlihan's Stadium; Attendance: 22,704; Referee: Ruben Rodhas

July 11, 1998 18	Colorado Rapids	2–1	New England Revolution	Denver, Colorado
	Wolde Harris 18'; Chris Henderson 28'; Marcus Hahnemann (yellow card) 90'	Report	Ted Chronopoulos 29'	Stadium: Mile High Stadium; Attendance: 8,996

July 15, 1998 19	New England Revolution	0–1	D.C. United	Foxborough Stadium
	Richard Goulooze (yellow card) 10'; Johnny Torres (yellow card) 30'	Report	Roy Lassiter 81'	Stadium: Foxboro Stadium; Attendance: 17,206; Referee: Noel Kenny

July 18, 1998 20	Dallas Burn	1–3	New England Revolution	Dallas, Texas
	Mickey Trotman 32'; Leonel Álvarez (yellow card) 38'; Chad Deering (yellow card) 78'	Report	Ivan McKinley 49' (yellow card) 64'; Óscar Pareja (yellow card) 52'; Joe-Max Moore 67' 88'; Jeff Causey (yellow card) 87'	Stadium: Cotton Bowl; Attendance: 10,073; Referee: Rich Grady

July 26, 1998 21	New England Revolution	1–2	Miami Fusion	Foxborough, Massachusetts
	Imad Baba 65'; Edwin Gorter (yellow card) 69'; Carlos Rocha (yellow card) 76'	Report	Henry Gutierrez 8'; Carlos Parra (yellow card) 42'; Dan Stebbins 86'; David Winner (yellow card) 89'	Stadium: Foxboro Stadium; Attendance: 18,337; Referee: Alex Prus

July 29, 1998 22	New England Revolution	1–3	Colorado Rapids	Foxborough, Massachusetts
	Ivan McKinley (yellow card) 5'; Dahir Mohammed (yellow card) 15'; Raúl Díaz Arce 35'; Mike Burns (yellow card) 68'	Report	Marcelo Balboa 3'; Paul Bravo 66'; Wolde Harris 84'	Stadium: Foxboro Stadium; Attendance: 13,074; Referee: Ali Saheli

August 5, 1998 23	New England Revolution	3–0	San Jose Clash	Foxborough, Massachusetts
	Ivan McKinley 13'; Mike Burns (yellow card) 38'; Joe-Max Moore 42'; Oscar Pareja (yellow card) 44'; Raul Diaz Arce 89'	Report	Shawn Medved (yellow card) 20'	Stadium: Foxboro Stadium; Attendance: 14,163; Referee: Robert Sheker

August 8, 1998 24	Columbus Crew	6–1	New England Revolution	Columbus, Ohio
	Jason Farrell 19'; Mike Clark (yellow card) 21'; Stern John 32' 84'; Brian McBride 41'; Thomas Dooley 63'; Rob Smith 78'	Report	Joe-Max Moore (yellow card) 17'; David Nakhid (yellow card) 55'; Raul Diaz Arce 89'	Stadium: Ohio Stadium; Referee: Michael Kennedy

August 14, 1998 25	Tampa Bay Mutiny	1–1 (2–3 p)	New England Revolution	Tampa, Florida
	Steve Ralston 44'	Report	Ivan McKinley 38'	Stadium: Houlihan's Stadium; Attendance: 8,429

August 22, 1998 26	New England Revolution	1–5	LA Galaxy	Foxborough, Massachusetts
	Mike Burns (red card); Raúl Díaz Arce (penalty missed) 89'	Report	Cobi Jones 11' 79' 85'; Carlos Hermosillo 56' 72'; Coi Jones (penalty missed); Paul Caligiuri (yellow card) 76'	Stadium: Foxboro Stadium; Attendance: 24,143; Referee: Kevin Terry

August 30, 1998 27	Miami Fusion	3–2	New England Revolution	Fort Lauderdale, Florida
	Diego Serna 17' 28'	Report	Edwin Gorter 56'; Raul Diaz Arce 74'; Paul Keegan (yellow card) 75'	Stadium: Lockhart Stadium; Referee: Brian Hall

September 2, 1998 28	MetroStars	0–2	New England Revolution	East Rutherford, New Jersey
	Alexi Lalas (yellow card) 32'; Jim Rooney (yellow card) 69'	Report	Joe-Max Moore 31'; Edwin Gorter 36'; Manny Motajo (yellow card) 40'; Ivan McKinley (yellow card) 42'; Edwin Gorter (yellow card) 75'	Stadium: Giants Stadium; Attendance: 10,826

September 12, 1998 29	New England Revolution	2–0	Columbus Crew	Foxborough, Massachusetts
	Joe-Max Moore 35'; Many Motajo (yellow card) 46'; Imad baba (yellow card) 50'; Ian Feuer (yellow card) 57'; Jair 83'	Report		Stadium: Foxboro Stadium; Attendance: 35,462; Referee: Jose Manual Garcia Aranda

September 19, 1998 30	New England Revolution	3–0	Tampa Bay Mutiny	Foxborough, Massachusetts
	Imad Baba 20'; Joe-Max Moore 59' (yellow card) 67'; Chad McCarty (o.g.); Brian Dunseth (yellow card) 78'; Johnny Torres (yellow card) 78'	Report	Jan Eriksson (yellow card) 34'	Stadium: Foxboro Stadium; Attendance: 16,807; Referee: Kevin Stott

September 23, 1998 31	Chicago Fire	3–2	New England Revolution	Chicago, Illinois
	Luboš Kubík 34'; C. J. Brown (yellow card) 57'; Frank Klopas 74'; Jerzy Podbrozny (yellow card) 87'; Josh Wolff 89'	Report	Edwin Gorter 43'; Mike Burns 68'	Stadium: Soldier Field; Attendance: 11,244; Referee: Michael Kennedy

September 26, 1998 32	New England Revolution	0–0 (2–4 p)	MetroStars	Foxborough, Massachusetts
		Report		Stadium: Foxboro Stadium; Attendance: 24,763; Referee: Alberto Giordano

== Miscellany ==
- As of 2025, the Revolution have finished at the bottom of the Eastern Conference Table on three occasions (1996, 1998, and 2011) but the 1998 season is the only season in which they have finished at the foot of the MLS table, thus winning the MLS Wooden Spoon.
- Despite poor on-field results, the Revolution had the second-highest attendance in Major League Soccer in 1998 (19,188), a figure down slightly from their league-leading mark of 21,298 in 1997.
- Raúl Díaz Arce's 18 goals (T3-highest in the league) was the most a Revolution player scored in a single season throughout the team's first three years of league play. That record would stand until it was broken by Taylor Twellman in 2002. Arce's single-season tally remains the 2nd highest in Revolution history, only matched by Lee Nguyen in 2014.
- The Revolution conceded a league-leading 4 hat-tricks in 1998.
- Walter Zenga was officially named the league's first-ever player/coach on October 28, 1998.
