= 1999 New England Revolution season =

New England Revolution
1999 season
- Owner: Robert Kraft (The Kraft Group)
- Head coach: Walter Zenga (until September 30); Steve Nicol (caretaker manager)
- Stadium: Foxboro Stadium; Foxborough, Massachusetts
- MLS: Conference: 5th Overall: 10th
- Top goalscorer: League: Joe-Max Moore (15); All: Joe-Max Moore (15)
- Highest home attendance: 30,564 (September 4, vs. Tampa Bay)
- Lowest home attendance: 7,260 (September 7, vs. Kansas City)
- Average home league attendance: 16,735
- Biggest win: 2–0 (June 5, vs. Chicago Fire)
- Biggest defeat: 5–1 (September 4, vs. Tampa Bay)

The 1999 New England Revolution season was the fourth season for the New England Revolution both as a club and in Major League Soccer (MLS). As the club did not participate in the 1999 U.S. Open Cup, and did not qualify for the MLS Cup Playoffs, they participated only in the MLS regular season.

== Summary ==
At the end of the 1998 season, Walter Zenga made history by becoming the league's fist-ever player-manager. Zenga's Revolution showed their intent to return to the playoffs for the first time since 1997 by signing former United States men's national soccer team captain John Harkes, and 1996 MLS All-Stars Giovanni Savarese and Dan Calichman prior to the 1999 Major League Soccer season. Zenga's Revolution got its first win on April 3. The team made several acquisitions in mid-season, including then-highest-paid MLS player of all time Ariel Graziani, two-time MLS Cup champion Mario Gori, two-time MLS All-Star Leonel Alvarez, and Jeff Baicher, but were unable to make a run, going on a ten-game winless streak from early July to early September, then winning only two of their final six matches to round out the season. On September 30, following a loss to the Dallas Burn, the Revolution made a late-season coaching change (for the second year in a row) as Zenga was relieved of his playing and coaching duties and replaced by Steve Nicol for the team's final two matches.

Despite poor on-field performance, fan support remained strong for the Revolution. The club's average home attendance of 16,735 was fourth-highest in the league. Joe-Max Moore's 15 goals tied him for fourth-highest total in the league with San Jose's Ronald Cerritos. Moore, Harkes, and Zenga were all named to the 1999 MLS All-Star Game. Despite these accolades, the Revolution would miss the playoffs for the second season in a row, recording a record of 7 wins and 20 losses, placing fifth in the Eastern Conference and 10th in the overall MLS table.

== Squad ==
=== First Team Squad ===
The New England Revolution's 1999 roster adapted from the document "Club History: All-Time Results".

Note: Flags indicate national team as defined under FIFA eligibility rules; some limited exceptions apply. Players may hold more than one non-FIFA nationality.

No.	Pos.	Nation	Player
9	FW	USA	Joe-Max Moore
17	FW	VEN	Giovanni Savarese
7	MF	RSA	Ivan McKinley
20	FW	USA	Johnny Torres
6	MF	USA	John Harkes
5	DF	USA	Ted Chronopoulos
4	MF	USA	Mike Burns
16	MF	CPV	Jair
16	MF	NGA	Carlos Parra
8	MF	USA	Jeff Baicher
10	MF	NED	Edwin Gorter
14	MF	COL	Leonel Alvarez
14	MF	USA	Kris Kelderman
17	FW	USA	Jamar Beasley
2	DF	USA	Brian Dunseth

No.	Pos.	Nation	Player
11	DF	ARG	Mario Gori
18	FW	IRL	Paul Keegan
1	GK	ITA	Walter Zenga
21	MF	USA	Imad Baba
3	DF	USA	Dan Calichman
26	GK	USA	Jeff Causey
19	DF	CAN	Chaka Daley
21	MF	CPV	Paulo Dos Santos
7	DF	NED	Richard Goulooze
7	FW	ECU	Ariel Graziani
22	FW	USA	Tony Kuhn
24	DF	NGA	Manny Motajo
33	FW	POR	Carlos Rocha
16	FW	CAN	John Kerr
25	GK	USA	Anthony Latronica

== Player movement ==
New England Revolution – 1999 Transfers In
Name	Position	Date	Method	Fee	Previous club	Reference
Dan Calichman	D	January 5, 1999	Trade	N/A	LA Galaxy	
Giovanni Savarese	F	January 20, 1999	Trade	N/A	MetroStars	
Leighton O’Brien	M	February 7, 1999	SuperDraft	N/A	San Diego Toreros	
Chris Fox	D	February 7, 1999	SuperDraft	N/A	Brown University	
Paulo Dos Santos	M	March 12, 1999	Free Transfer	N/A	Rhode Island Stingrays	
John Harkes	M	March 16, 1999	Return from Loan	N/A	Nottingham Forest	
Tony Kuhn	F	April 5, 1999	Waiver Claim	N/A	Chicago Fire	
Carlos Parra	M	June 4, 1999	Trade	N/A	Miami Fusion	
Chaka Daley	D	June 14, 1999	Free Transfer	N/A	Boston Bulldogs	
Mario Gori	D	June 22, 1999	Trade	N/A	Miami Fusion	
Ariel Graziani	F	July 26, 1999	Allocation	N/A	Monarcas Morelia	
Leonel Alvarez	M	August 13, 1999	Trade	N/A	Dallas Burn	
Jeff Baicher	M	August 13, 1999	Trade	N/A	San Jose Clash	
Eduardo Hurtado	F	December 3, 1999	Waiver Claim	N/A	MetroStars	
Mauricio Ramos	M	December 6, 1999	Trade	N/A	Tampa Bay Mutiny	

New England Revolution – 1999 Transfers Out
Name	Position	Date	Method	Fee	Next Club	Reference
Ian Feuer	GK	February 24, 1999	Trade	N/A	Colorado Rapids	
Chris Fox	M	March 30, 1999	Waived	N/A	Boston Bulldogs	
Leighton O'Brien	M	March 30, 1999	Waived	N/A	San Jose Clash	
Carlos Rocha	F	March 30, 1999	Waived	N/A	Boston Bulldogs	
Tony Kuhn	F	June 4, 1999	Traded	N/A	Miami Fusion	
Manny Motajo	D	June 14, 1999	Waived	N/A	N/A	
Edwin Gorter	M	June 22, 1999	Traded	N/A	Miami Fusion	
Ariel Graziani	F	August 13, 1999	Traded	N/A	Dallas Burn	
Jair	M	August 13, 1999	Traded	N/A	San Jose Clash	
Walter Zenga	GK	September 30, 1999	"Relieved"	N/A	N/A	
Joe-Max More	F	November 11, 1999	Free Transfer	N/A	Everton F.C.	
Mario Gori	D	November 22, 1999	Waived	N/A	Columbus Crew	
Chaka Daley	D	November 22, 1999	Waived	N/A	N/A	
Kris Kelderman	M	December 1, 1999	Waived	N/A	Milwaukee Wave	

=== Notes ===
1. Acquired from LA Galaxy in exchange for a first-round pick in the 1999 MLS Supplemental Draft and a second-round pick in the 1999 MLS College Draft.
2. Acquired Savarese and a second-round pick in the 2000 MLS College Draft from the MetroStars in exchange for Raul Diaz Arce
3. Acquired from Miami Fusion in exchange for Tony Kuhn and a second-round pick in the 2000 MLS College Draft.
4. Acquired from the Miami Fusion in exchange for Edwin Gorter.
5. Acquired from the Dallas Burn in exchange for Ariel Graziani.
6. Acquired from the San Jose Clash in exchange for Jair
7. Acquired along with a selection in the 2001 MLS SuperDraft from the Tampa Bay Mutiny in exchange for a player allocation.
8. To the Colorado Rapids in exchange for future considerations.
9. Traded to the Miami Fusion in return for Carlos Parra and a second-round pick in the 2000 MLS College Draft.
10. Traded to the Miami Fusion for Mario Gori.
11. Traded to the Dallas Burn for Leonel Alvarez.
12. Traded to the San Jose Clash in exchange for Jeff Baicher.

== League and Team Awards ==
New England Revolution – 2001 League Awards
Award	Player(s)	Winner / Finalist	Reference
MLS All-Stars	John Harkes, Walter Zenga, Joe-Max Moore	Winner	
MLS Player of the Week	Ivan McKiley (Week 8), Giovanni Savarese (Week 11, Week 26), Joe-Max Moore (Week 14)	Winner	

New England Revolution – 2001 Team Awards
Award	Player(s)	Winner / Finalist	Reference
Revolution MVP	Joe-Max Moore	Winner	
Revolution Scoring Champion	Joe-Max Moore (15g, 8a)	Winner	
Revolution Defender of the Year	Dan Calichman	Winner	

=== Annual Leaders ===
Games Played: Ted Chronopoulos (31)
Games Started: Ted Chronopoulos (31)
Goals: Joe-Max Moore (15)
Assists: Joe-Max Moore, John Harkes (8)
Shots: Joe-Max Moore (83)
Shots on Goal: Joe-Max Moore (47)
Fouls Committed: Joe-Max Moore (49)
Fouls Suffered: Joe-Max Moore (66)

== Standings ==
=== Eastern Conference ===
Pos	Team	Pld	W	SOW	L	GF	GA	GD	Pts	Qualification
1	D.C. United	32	17	6	9	65	43	+22	57	MLS Cup Playoffs
2	Columbus Crew	32	13	6	13	48	39	+9	45	MLS Cup Playoffs
3	Tampa Bay Mutiny	32	9	5	18	51	50	+1	32	MLS Cup Playoffs
4	Miami Fusion	32	8	5	19	42	59	−17	29	MLS Cup Playoffs
5	New England Revolution	32	7	5	20	38	53	−15	26	
6	MetroStars	32	4	3	25	32	64	−32	15	

Source: MLS

=== Overall standings ===
Pos	Team	Pld	W	SOW	L	GF	GA	GD	Pts	Qualification
1	D.C. United (C, S)	32	17	6	9	65	43	+22	57	CONCACAF Champions' Cup
2	Los Angeles Galaxy	32	17	3	12	49	29	+20	54	CONCACAF Champions' Cup
3	Dallas Burn	32	16	3	13	54	35	+19	51	
4	Chicago Fire	32	15	3	14	51	36	+15	48	
5	Colorado Rapids	32	14	6	12	38	39	−1	48	
6	Columbus Crew	32	13	6	13	48	39	+9	45	
7	San Jose Clash	32	9	10	13	48	49	−1	37	
8	Tampa Bay Mutiny	32	9	5	18	51	50	+1	32	
9	Miami Fusion	32	8	5	19	42	59	−17	29	
10	New England Revolution	32	7	5	20	38	53	−15	26	
11	Kansas City Wizards	32	6	2	24	33	53	−20	20	
12	MetroStars	32	4	3	25	32	64	−32	15	

Source: MLS
Rules for classification: 1) points; 2) head-to-head record; 3) goal difference; 4) number of goals scored
(C) Champions; (S) Supporters' Shield

== Results ==
=== Regular season ===
March 28, 1999 1	Miami Fusion	1–1 (4–3 SO)	New England Revolution	Fort Lauderdale, Florida
	Carlos Parra (yellow card) 24'; Nelson Vargas (penalty missed); Tyrone Marshall 46'	Report	Giovanni Savarese 1'; Carlos Rocha (yellow card) 82'	Stadium: Lockhart Stadium; Attendance: 7,211; Referee: Noel Kenny

April 3, 1999 2	Kansas City Wizards	0–1	New England Revolution	Kansas City, MO
		Report	Joe-Max Moore 40'	Stadium: Arrowhead Stadium; Attendance: 8,313; Referee: Michael Kennedy

April 10, 1999 3	New England Revolution	2–2 (3–4 SO)	DC United	Foxborough, Massachusetts
	Joe-Max Moore 50'; Johnny Torres 83'	Report	Geoff Aunger 45'; Roy Lassiter 73'	Stadium: Foxboro Stadium; Attendance: 18,373; Referee: Ali Saheli

April 17, 1999 4	New England Revolution	0–0 (1–4 SO)	Columbus Crew	Foxborough, Massachusetts
	Tony Kuhn (yellow card) 75'	Report	Mike Lapper (yellow card) 83'	Stadium: Foxboro Stadium; Attendance: 14,732; Referee: Nancy Lay

April 24, 1999 5	DC United	2–3	New England Revolution	Washington, D.C.
	Carey Talley (yellow card) 20'; Roy Lassiter 27'; Marco Etcheverry (yellow card) 70'; Carlos Llamosa 76; A.J. Wood 87'	Report	Ivan McKinley (yellow card) 26' (goal) 32' 45'; Walter Zenga (yellow card) 27'; Giovanni Savarese 37'; Jair (yellow card) 54'; Ted Chronopoulos (yellow card) 70'	Stadium: RFK Stadium; Attendance: 15,132; Referee: Rich Grady

May 1, 1999 6	New England Revolution	1–2	Colorado Rapids	Foxborough, Massachusetts
	Joe-Max Moore 20'; Ivan McKinley (yellow card) 88' (red card) 88'; Walter Zenga (yellow card) 83'	Report	Jorge Dely Valdes 7'; Wolde Harris 82'; Marcus Hahnemann (yellow card) 88'	Stadium: Foxboro Stadium; Attendance: 13,427; Referee: Ruben Rodhas

May 8, 1999 7	New England Revolution	0–0 (3–2 SO)	Miami Fusion	Foxborough, Massachusetts
		Report	Jim Rooney (yellow card) 11'; Mario Gori (yellow card) 34'	Stadium: Foxboro Stadium; Attendance: 11,173; Referee: Robert Sheker

May 15, 1999 8	Columbus Crew	2–0	New England Revolution	Columbus, Ohio
	Jeff Cunningham 10' (yellow card) 83'; Stern John 59'	Report	Kris Kelderman (yellow card) 15'; Paulo Dos Santos (yellow card) 80'	Stadium: Columbus Crew Stadium; Attendance: 24,741; Referee: Brian Hall

May 23, 1999 9	LA Galaxy	1–0	New England Revolution	Pasadena, California
	Steve Jolley 3'; Marvin Quijano (yellow card) 84'	Report		Stadium: Rose Bowl; Attendance: 7,581; Referee: Sandra Hunt

May 29, 1999 10	Metro Stars	3–3 (0–1 SO)	New England Revolution	East Rutherford, New Jersey
	Eduardo Hurtado 6'; Nansha Kalonji (yellow card) 38'; Arley Palacios 50' (yellow card) 78'; Brian Kelly 58'	Report	Ivan McKinley 21'; Giovanni Savarese 34' (yellow card) 49' (goal) 54'; Dan Calichman (yellow card) 81'; Richard Goulooze (yellow card) 83'	Stadium: Giants Stadium; Attendance: 43,192; Referee: Ali Mohamed Bujsaim

June 5, 1999 11	New England Revolution	2–0	Chicago Fire	Foxborough, Massachusetts
	Joe-Max Moore 17'; Edwin Gorter (yellow card) 41'; Ivan McKinley (yellow card) 52' (goal) 76'; Ted Chronopoulos (yellow card) 72'	Report	Jesse Marsch (yellow card) 3'	Stadium: Foxboro Stadium; Attendance: 21,313; Referee: Gerry Corrie

June 13, 1999 12	New England Revolution	3–3 (3–1 SO)	Miami Fusion	Foxborough, Massachusetts
	Johnny Torres 20' (yellow card) 24' (goal) 85'; Edwin Gorter 89'	Report	Henry Gutierrez 24'; Tyrone Marshall 64'; Pablo Mastroeni (yellow card) 66'; Diego Serna 87'	Stadium: Foxboro Stadium; Attendance: 19,069; Referee: Alberto Giordano

June 16, 1999 13	Columbus Crew	1–1 (2–1 SO)	New England Revolution	Columbus, Ohio
	Jeff Cunningham 14'; Andreas herzog 59'; Jovan Kirovski 69'	Report	Giovanni Savarese 5'; Brian Dunseth (yellow card) 25'; Ivan McKinley (yellow card) 28'	Stadium: Columbus Crew Stadium; Attendance: 14,005; Referee: Michael Kennedy

June 19, 1999 14	Tampa Bay Mutiny	2–3	New England Revolution	Carson, California
	Musa Shannon (yellow card) 21' (goal) 34'; Pete Marino 75'	Report	Joe-Max Moore 4' 81'; Ivan McKinley (yellow card) 27'; Mike Burns (yellow card) 33'; Jair 62' (yellow card) 70'; Carlos Parra (red card) 87'	Stadium: Home Depot Center; Attendance: 11,256; Referee: Gerry Corrie

June 26, 1999 15	Dallas Burn	2–0	New England Revolution	Dallas, Texas
	Chad Derring (yellow card) 27'; Jorge Rodriguez 37'; Jason Kreis 90'	Report	Jair (yellow card) 23'; Brian Dunseth (yellow card) 72'	Stadium: Cotton Bowl; Attendance: 12,567; Referee: Richard Heron

July 4, 1999 16	New England Revolution	3–2	MetroStars	Foxborough, Massachusetts
	Joe-Max Moore 22' 53'; Giovanni Savarese 27'; Carlos Parra (yellow card) 83'	Report	Mark Chung 30'; Tab Ramos (yellow card) 77'; Petter Villegas 84'	Stadium: Foxboro Stadium; Attendance: 28,986; Referee: Nancy Lay

July 11, 1999 17	New England Revolution	2–5	LA Galaxy	Foxborough, Massachusetts
	Dan Calichman (yellow card) 23'; Joe-Max Moore 39' 66'; Walter Zenga (yellow card) 66'	Report	Mauricio Cienfuegos (yellow card) 37'; Clint Mathis 40'; Ezra Hendrickson 63'; Greg Vanney (yellow card) 66'; Roy Myers 73'; Cobi Jones 85'; Carlos Hermosillo 90'	Stadium: Foxboro Stadium; Attendance: 14,323; Referee: Alex Prus

July 25, 1999 18	New England Revolution	0–2	DC United	Foxborough, Massachusetts
	Jamar Beasley (yellow card) 23'; Mario Gori (yellow card) 54'; Jair (yellow card) 71'	Report	Roy Lassiter 11'; Carey Talley 33'; Judah Cooks (yellow card) 75'	Stadium: Foxboro Stadium; Attendance: 15,132; Referee: Kazuhiko Matsumura

July 31, 1999 19	Tampa Bay Mutiny	4–1	New England Revolution	Tampa, Florida
	Raul Diaz Arce 6' 88'; Steve Trittschuh (yellow card) 35'; Musa Shannon 44'; Steve Ralston 55'; Chris Houser (yellow card) 75'	Report	Walter Zenga (yellow card) 12'; Carlos Parra 76'	Stadium: Raymond James Stadium; Attendance: 14,879; Referee: Paul Tamberino

August 6, 1999 20	Colorado Rapids	0–0 (3–2 SO)	New England Revolution	Denver, Colorado
	Tahj Jakins (yellow card) 29'	Report	Brian Dunseth (yellow card) 20'; Ariel Graziani (yellow card) 52'	Stadium: Mile High Stadium; Attendance: 23,895; Referee: Francisco Sanchez

August 12, 1999 21	New England Revolution	1–2	San Jose Clash	Foxborough, Massachusetts
	Ted Chronopoulos 6'; Mike Burns (yellow card) 56'; Giovanni Savarese (yellow card) 61'; Mario Gori (yellow card) 80'	Report	John Doyle 54'; Eddie Lewis (yellow card) 90'	Stadium: Foxboro Stadium; Attendance: 13,427; Referee: Thomas Perry

August 18, 1999 22	New England Revolution	0–1	Tampa Bay Mutiny	Foxborough, Massachusetts
	Mike Burns (yellow card) 82'	Report	Ritchie Kotschau 43'; Musa Shannon (yellow card) 75'	Stadium: Foxboro Stadium; Attendance: 13,087; Referee: Marcel Yonan

August 21, 1999 23	San Jose Clash	2–1	New England Revolution	Carson, California
	Ronald Cerritos 14'; Richard Mulrooney (yellow card) 30'; Alejandro Sequeira (yellow card) 49' (goal) 63'; Braeden Cloutier (yellow card) 83'	Report	Brian Dunseth (yellow card) 12'; Walter Zenga (yellow card) 13'; Ivan McKinley (yellow card) 29'; Ted Chronopoulos (yellow card) 32'; Joe-Max Moore 37'; Jeff Baicher (yellow card) 38'; Mario Gori (red card) 43'	Stadium: Home Depot Center; Attendance: 10,112; Referee: Ali Saheli

August 25, 1999 24	MetroStars	1–1 (1–3 SO)	New England Revolution	East Rutherford, New Jersey
	Mike Duhaney 14'; Nansha Kalonji (yellow card) 65'	Report	Joe-Max Moore 46'; Jeff Baicher (yellow card) 66'; Ivan McKinley (yellow card) 67'; Brian Dunseth (yellow card) 72'	Stadium: Giants Stadium; Attendance: 9,143; Referee: Kevin Stott

August 28, 1999 25	Chicago Fire	2–1	New England Revolution	Chicago, Illinois
	Roman Kosecki 27'; Piotr Nowak 38'; Jovan Kirovski 69'	Report	Mike Burns 73'	Stadium: Soldier Field; Attendance: 18,517; Referee: Richard Heron

September 4, 1999 26	New England Revolution	1–5	Tampa Bay Mutiny	Foxborough, Massachusetts
	Giovanni Savarese 17'; Brian Dunseth (yellow card) 53'	Report	Manny Lagos 15' 21'; Raul Diaz Arce 38'; Carlos Valderrama 47'; Mauricio Ramos 67'	Stadium: Foxboro Stadium; Attendance: 30,564; Referee: Andrew Barnes

September 7, 1999 27	New England Revolution	3–2	Kansas City Wizards	Foxborough, Massachusetts
	Mike Burns 30'; Jeff Baicher 59'; Giovanni Savarese 67' 81'; Joe-Max Moore 87'	Report	Preki 8'; Uche Okafor (yellow card) 40'; Chris Henderson 49'	Stadium: Foxboro Stadium; Attendance: 7,260; Referee: Robert Sheker

September 11, 1999 28	Miami Fusion	1–1	New England Revolution	Fort Lauderdale, Florida
	Welton 30'; Edwin Gorter (yellow card) 75'	Report	Giovanni Savarese 30'; Carlos Parra (yellow card) 68'	Stadium: Lockhart Stadium; Attendance: 8,038; Referee: Ricardo Valenzuela

September 18, 1999 29	New England Revolution	0–0 (1–4 SO)	Columbus Crew	Foxborough, Massachusetts
	Jeff Baicher (yellow card) 4'; John Harkes (yellow card) 24'; Leonel Alvarez (yellow card) 61'; Ted Chronopoulos (yellow card) 61'	Report	Brian West (yellow card) 11'; Robert Warzycha (yellow card) 31'	Stadium: Foxboro Stadium; Attendance: 16,278; Referee: Ted Covaciu

September 24, 1999 30	New England Revolution	0–1	Dallas Burn	Foxborough, Massachusetts
	Mario Gori (yellow card) 76'	Report	Oscar Pareja 70'; Sergi Daniv (yellow card) 76'	Stadium: Foxboro Stadium; Attendance: 9,273; Referee: Gerry Corrie

October 2, 1999 31	New England Revolution	2–1	MetroStars	Foxborough, Massachusetts
	Joe-Max Moore 24'; Dan Calichman (yellow card) 44'; Jeff Baicher 53'	Report	Lawrence Lozzano 70'	Stadium: Foxboro Stadium; Attendance: 21,335; Referee: Kevin Stott

October 9, 1999 32	DC United	1–1 (2:3 SO)	New England Revolution	Carson, California
	Ted Chronopoulos 2' (o.g.); Carey Talley (yellow card) 64'	Report	Joe-Max Moore 50'	Stadium: Home Depot Center; Attendance: 20,695; Referee: Marcel Yonan
