= 1998 San Jose Clash season =

San Jose Clash
1998 season
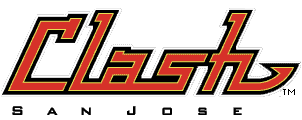
- Owner: Major League Soccer
- Coach: Brian Quinn
- Stadium: Spartan Stadium
- Major League Soccer: Division: 5th Overall: 10th
- MLS Cup: Did not qualify
- U.S. Open Cup: Quarterfinals
- California Clásico: 2nd
- Top goalscorer: Ronald Cerritos (13)

The 1998 San Jose Clash season was the third season of the team's existence.

== About ==
The 1998 season was one of excitement tempered by frustration. Quinn led the team to a 13–19 record, good for 33 points in MLS. San Jose was forced to play the first three home games of the season at Stanford University after winter rains delayed the renovation on Spartan Stadium. When the club returned to Spartan, they faced the New England Revolution May 3, 1998 on a newly widened field that was 70 yards wide and 110 yards long.

Ronald Cerritos again led the team, putting in 13 goals to finish the season as the eighth leading goal-scorer in the league. During the 1998 season the pieces of the eventual 2001 MLS Cup Champions began to form at Spartan Stadium. San Jose drafted eventual 2002 MLS all-star Wade Barrett was drafted in the first round of the 1998 College Draft, along with Alberto Montoya and Caleb Porter. Ben Parry was the 3rd overall selection in the 1998 College Draft but was forced into an early retirement with a rare stomach virus. San Jose picked up Francisco Uribe, Harut Karapetyan, and Brian Sebapole hoping to boost the Clash offense that already had Eddie Lewis, Jeff Baicher, Ronald Cerritos and Eric Wynalda, but failed to help lead the team to the playoffs. Karapetyan would return in 2000. Troy Dayak was shelved most of the season with a herniated disc in his neck and would be forced into retirement until 2001. Joe Cannon was called to the club from the A-League to serve as a backup for ten days before returning to soccer's minor leagues, he played the final 45 minutes against Toluca yielding 1 goal in an exhibition. Defender Richard Gough enjoyed an all-star season in 1998, as he was the only member of the team selected to play in the mid-season classic. The club was forced to play through May and June without forward Eric Wynalda, who was with the United States National Team at the World Cup in France. Wynalda appeared in two matches for the U.S. during the World Cup. John Doyle continued to be a dominant defender and captained the squad in 1998. Caleb Porter had to miss the entire 1998 season with a knee injury but would return for 1999. He eventually went on to lead the Portland Timbers to an MLS Cup Championship.

== Squad ==
=== Current squad ===
Note: Flags indicate national team as defined under FIFA eligibility rules; some limited exceptions apply. Players may hold more than one non-FIFA nationality.

No.	Pos.	Nation	Player
1	GK	USA	Andy Kirk
2	DF	USA	Ben Parry
3	DF	USA	John Doyle
4	DF	SCO	Richard Gough
5	DF	USA	Oscar Draguicevich
6	MF	USA	Martín Vásquez
7	FW	USA	Braeden Cloutier
8	FW	USA	Jeff Baicher
9	FW	ARM	Harut Karapetyan
9	FW	USA	Lawrence Lozzano
10	MF	USA	Alberto Montoya
10	FW	USA	Francisco Uribe
11	FW	USA	Eric Wynalda
12	DF	USA	Troy Dayak

No.	Pos.	Nation	Player
13	FW	USA	Shawn Medved
14	FW	USA	Esmundo Rodriguez
15	FW	CHI	Victor Mella
16	DF	USA	Tim Weaver
17	DF	USA	Tim Martin
18	GK	USA	David Kramer
20	FW	ESA	Ronald Cerritos
21	MF	USA	Eddie Lewis
24	DF	USA	Wade Barrett
NA	MF	USA	John Cariel
NA	MF	USA	Caleb Porter
11	FW	MEX	Juan Pablo Rodriguez
NA	GK	USA	Kevin Rueda

== Competitions ==
=== Major League Soccer ===
==== Standings ====
===== Western Conference =====
Pos	Team	Pld	W	SOW	L	GF	GA	GD	Pts	Qualification
1	Los Angeles Galaxy	32	22	2	8	85	44	+41	68	MLS Cup Playoffs
2	Chicago Fire	32	18	2	12	62	45	+17	56	MLS Cup Playoffs
3	Colorado Rapids	32	14	2	16	62	69	−7	44	MLS Cup Playoffs
4	Dallas Burn	32	11	4	17	43	59	−16	37	MLS Cup Playoffs
5	San Jose Clash	32	10	3	19	48	60	−12	33	
6	Kansas City Wizards	32	10	2	20	45	50	−5	32	

Source: MLS

===== Overall Table =====
Pos	Team	Pld	W	SOW	L	GF	GA	GD	Pts
8	Miami Fusion	32	10	5	17	46	68	−22	35
9	Tampa Bay Mutiny	32	11	1	20	46	57	−11	34
10	San Jose Clash	32	10	3	19	48	60	−12	33
11	Kansas City Wizards	32	10	2	20	45	50	−5	32
12	New England Revolution	32	9	2	21	53	66	−13	29

Source: MLS
Rules for classification: 1) points; 2) head-to-head record; 3) goal difference; 4) number of goals scored

==== Matches ====
March 21, 1998	Los Angeles Galaxy	3–3 (SO)	San Jose Clash	Pasadena, California
	Machón 17'; Hurtado 27'; Wélton 48'	Report	Lozzano 43'; Mella 61'; Wynalda 78'	Stadium: Rose Bowl; Attendance: 36,281

March 28, 1998	San Jose Clash	2–2 (SO)	Colorado Rapids	Stanford, California
	Wynalda 74'; Lozzano 87'	Report	Sáenz 11'; White 64'	Stadium: Stanford Stadium; Attendance: 15,028

April 5, 1998	San Jose Clash	2–2 (SO)	Dallas Burn	Stanford, California
	Wynalda 13'; Mella 83'	Report	Eck 5'; Kreis 48'	Stadium: Stanford Stadium; Attendance: 10,069

April 11, 1998	San Jose Clash	1–0	Chicago Fire	Stanford, California
	Cerritos 37'	Report		Stadium: Stanford Stadium; Attendance: 9,937

April 18, 1998	Dallas Burn	1–2	San Jose Clash	Dallas, Texas
	Elliott 52'	Report	Mella 71'; Lozzano 76'	Stadium: Cotton Bowl; Attendance: 12,939

April 25, 1998	MetroStars	4–3	San Jose Clash	East Rutherford, New Jersey
	Rooney 26'; Savarese 66'; Hurtado 69'; Lalas 90'	Report	Lewis 10'; Cerritos 16'; Lewis 77'	Stadium: Giants Stadium; Attendance: 17,380

April 29, 1998	D.C. United	3–1	San Jose Clash	Washington, D.C.
	Harkes 11'; Harkes 59'; Lassiter 70'	Report	Lozzano 25'	Stadium: RFK Stadium; Attendance: 9,755

May 3, 1998	San Jose Clash	1–3	New England Revolution	San Jose, California
	Barrett 36'	Report	Baba 21'; Goulooze 41'; Gorter 63'	Stadium: Spartan Stadium; Attendance: 13,563

May 9, 1998	Colorado Rapids	2–3	San Jose Clash	Denver, Colorado
	Marquinho 32'; Bravo 73'	Report	Baicher 20'; Lewis 46'; Cerritos 80'	Stadium: Mile High Stadium; Attendance: 11,543

May 16, 1998	San Jose Clash	2–0	Miami Fusion	San Jose, California
	Cerritos 34'; Cerritos 81'	Report		Stadium: Spartan Stadium; Attendance: 23,861

May 23, 1998	Kansas City Wizards	0–1	San Jose Clash	Kansas City, Missouri
		Report	Cerritos 1'	Stadium: Arrowhead Stadium; Attendance: 10,333

May 30, 1998	Columbus Crew	4–1	San Jose Clash	Columbus, Ohio
	Cunningham 27'; John 62'; John 72'; John 80'	Report	Baicher 31'	Stadium: Ohio Stadium; Attendance: 10,903

June 3, 1998	San Jose Clash	0–4	D.C. United	San Jose, California
		Report	Moreno 41'; Olsen 54'; Williams 65'; Sanneh 76'	Stadium: Spartan Stadium; Attendance: 10,191

June 6, 1998	Colorado Rapids	2–0	San Jose Clash	Denver, Colorado
	Paule 50'; Henderson 56'	Report		Stadium: Mile High Stadium; Attendance: 18,473

June 11, 1998	Chicago Fire	5–2	San Jose Clash	Chicago
	Razov 4'; Nowak 33'; Nowak 49'; Kotschau 52'; Wolff 74'	Report	Uribe 76'; Cerritos 80'	Stadium: Soldier Field; Attendance: 7,598

June 27, 1998	San Jose Clash	1–2	Los Angeles Galaxy	San Jose, California
	Gough 15'	Report	Caligiuri 64'; Karapetyan 85'	Stadium: Spartan Stadium; Attendance: 22,694

July 3, 1998	San Jose Clash	1–1 (SO)	Columbus Crew	San Jose, California
	Cerritos 84'	Report	Maisonneuve 39'	Stadium: Spartan Stadium; Attendance: 10,326

July 15, 1998	Miami Fusion	2–2 (SO)	San Jose Clash	Fort Lauderdale, Florida
	Stebbins 32'; Cullen 47'	Report	Baicher 20'; Gough 78'	Stadium: Lockhart Stadium; Attendance: 8,078

July 18, 1998	San Jose Clash	0–1	Tampa Bay Mutiny	San Jose, California
		Report	Ramos 86'	Stadium: Spartan Stadium; Attendance: 10,136

July 25, 1998	San Jose Clash	1–1 (SO)	Kansas City Wizards	San Jose, California
	Wynalda 42'	Report	Johnston 45'	Stadium: Spartan Stadium; Attendance: 10,182

July 29, 1998	San Jose Clash	3–0	Chicago Fire	San Jose, California
	Cloutier 32'; Baicher 70'; Wynalda 77'	Report		Stadium: Spartan Stadium; Attendance: 12,299

August 5, 1998	New England Revolution	3–0	San Jose Clash	Foxborough, Massachusetts
	McKinley 13'; Moore 42'; Díaz Arce 89'	Report		Stadium: Foxboro Stadium; Attendance: 14,163

August 9, 1998	San Jose Clash	5–1	MetroStars	San Jose, California
	Doyle 20'; Cloutier 60'; Draguicevich 73'; Wynalda 76'; Mella 85'	Report	Soñora 39'	Stadium: Spartan Stadium; Attendance: 9,102

August 15, 1998	Chicago Fire	2–1	San Jose Clash	Chicago
	Kosecki 15'; Wolff 80'	Report	Cerritos 7'	Stadium: Soldier Field; Attendance: 16,610

August 22, 1998	San Jose Clash	1–1 (SO)	Dallas Burn	San Jose, California
	Cerritos 32'	Report	Haynes 76'	Stadium: Spartan Stadium; Attendance: 11,706

August 29, 1998	San Jose Clash	1–3	Colorado Rapids	San Jose, California
	Uribe 75'	Report	Paule 23'; Vermes 25'; White 46'	Stadium: Spartan Stadium; Attendance: 15,101

September 3, 1998	Tampa Bay Mutiny	2–1	San Jose Clash	Tampa, Florida
	Ramos 33'; Wegerle 85'	Report	Cerritos 80'	Stadium: Houlihan's Stadium; Attendance: 5,880

September 5, 1998	Kansas City Wizards	5–1	San Jose Clash	Kansas City, Missouri
	Johnston 12'; Preki 18'; Preki 48'; Wright 59'; Preki 80'	Report	Cerritos 7'	Stadium: Arrowhead Stadium; Attendance: 6,755

September 13, 1998	Dallas Burn	1–3	San Jose Clash	Dallas, Texas
	Deering 19'	Report	Barrett 25'; Draguicevich 67'; Draguicevich 73'	Stadium: Cotton Bowl; Attendance: 10,325

September 16, 1998	San Jose Clash	0–0 (SO)	Los Angeles Galaxy	San Jose, California
		Report		Stadium: Spartan Stadium; Attendance: 15,893

September 20, 1998	Los Angeles Galaxy	0–1	San Jose Clash	Pasadena, California
		Report	Cerritos 41'	Stadium: Rose Bowl; Attendance: 11,123

September 27, 1998	San Jose Clash	2–0	Kansas City Wizards	San Jose, California
	Cloutier 27'; Draguicevich 84'	Report		Stadium: Spartan Stadium; Attendance: 18,362

(SO) = Shootout

=== U.S. Open Cup ===
July 7, 1998 Third Round	El Paso Patriots	0–2	San Jose Clash	El Paso, Texas
		Report	Doyle 38'; Doyle 78'	Attendance: 3,175

July 22, 1998 Quarterfinal	San Jose Clash	1–1 (asdet) (3–4 p)	Chicago Fire	Dallas, Texas
	Baicher 65'	Report	Kubík 55'	Stadium: Cotton Bowl; Attendance: 3,812
	Penalties
	Medved (penalty scored); Wynalda (penalty missed); Mella (penalty scored); Cerritos (penalty scored); Gough (penalty missed)		(penalty scored) Kubík; (penalty missed) Wolff; (penalty scored) Razov; (penalty scored) Kuhn; (penalty scored) Gutiérrez
