= Midnight Riders (MLS supporters association) =

- Midnight Riders logo
- Abbreviation: MR95
- Established: 1995
- Type: Supporters group
- Team: New England Revolution
- Location: Foxborough, Massachusetts, U.S.
- Arena: Gillette Stadium
- Stand: Section 143
- Membership: 500+
- Colors: Blue, red
- Website: www.midnightriders.com

The Midnight Riders is the independent supporters group for the New England Revolution of Major League Soccer. The name refers to the Midnight Ride of Paul Revere at the beginning of the American Revolutionary War. The main aim of the Midnight Riders “is to form a network of supporters such that (they) can meet, watch, travel to, and discuss games, and have a collective voice for supporters' interests with Revolution management.” The Midnight Riders are viewed as “the most passionate Revolution followers”, have been around since the inception of the league, and are known for their use of chants, singing, drums, and banners to show their support for the team and lead others in doing so. The main colors worn amongst the Midnight Riders are dark blue and white (often jerseys of New England Revolution players). The majority of the Midnight Riders sit in the north stand of the stadium (section 143) and have a banner hanging across the front of this section. In addition to their game time activities, the Midnight Riders are responsible for hosting and participating in charitable events, organizing road trips to away games, and awarding an annual “Man of the Year” award.

== The Fort ==
The majority of the Midnight Riders occupy Section 143 of Gillette Stadium, the section behind the goal at the north end of the stadium, which they have nicknamed "The Fort". The Fort is a general admission section and draws its name from the revolutionary theme which runs through the team and independent supporters' associations.

The Fort is open to all supporters of the New England Revolution who want to support their team by singing, chanting, shouting, standing, waving flags, and doing so in the company of other like-minded fans, as long as they agree with the Midnight Riders' first motto. The other Revolution supporters groups the Rev Army and The Rebellion also stand in The Fort.

== Midnight Riders Man of the Year ==
The Midnight Riders annually present an award to the New England player deemed most valuable to the team. The award is voted on by the membership. At the conclusion of every game, members are able to vote online for that game's Man of the Match. At the final home game of the regular season, those votes are tallied and the award is presented by the board of the organization to the winning player. Taylor Twellman is the winningest player, having been presented the award four times between 2002 and 2007.

Year	Player	Position
1996	(Argentina) Alberto "Beto" Naveda	Midfield
1997	(Italy) Walter Zenga	Goalkeeper
1998	(Netherlands) Edwin Gorter	Midfield
1999	(United States) Dan Calichman	Defender
2000	(United States) Rusty Pierce	Defender
2001	(Brazil) Catê	Midfielder
2002	(United States) Taylor Twellman	Forward
2003	(United States) Taylor Twellman	Forward
2004	(United States) Clint Dempsey	Midfielder
2005	(United States) Taylor Twellman	Forward
2006	(Wales) Andy Dorman	Midfielder
2007	(United States) Taylor Twellman	Forward
2008	(United States) Matt Reis	Goalkeeper
2009	(Grenada) Shalrie Joseph	Midfielder
2010	(Grenada) Shalrie Joseph	Midfielder
2011	(United States) Benny Feilhaber	Midfielder
2012	(United States) Lee Nguyen	Midfielder
2013	(Portugal) José Gonçalves	Defender
2014	(United States) Lee Nguyen	Midfielder
2015	(United States) Charlie Davies	Forward
2016	(United States) Chris Tierney	Defender
2017	(Uruguay) Diego Fagundez	Midfielder
2018	(Ecuador) Cristian Penilla	Midfielder
2019	(Spain) Carles Gil	Midfielder
2020	(United States) Matt Turner	Goalkeeper
2021	(Spain) Carles Gil	Midfielder
2022	(United States) DeJuan Jones	Defender
2023	(Spain) Carles Gil	Midfielder
2024	(Slovenia) Aljaž Ivačič	Goalkeeper
2025	(United States) Matt Turner	Goalkeeper
