= Van Saun =

Van Saun may refer to:

- Jesse Van Saun (born 1976), American soccer player
- Van Saun County Park, park in Paramus, New Jersey, United States
