= José Gonçalves (footballer) =

Portuguese footballer

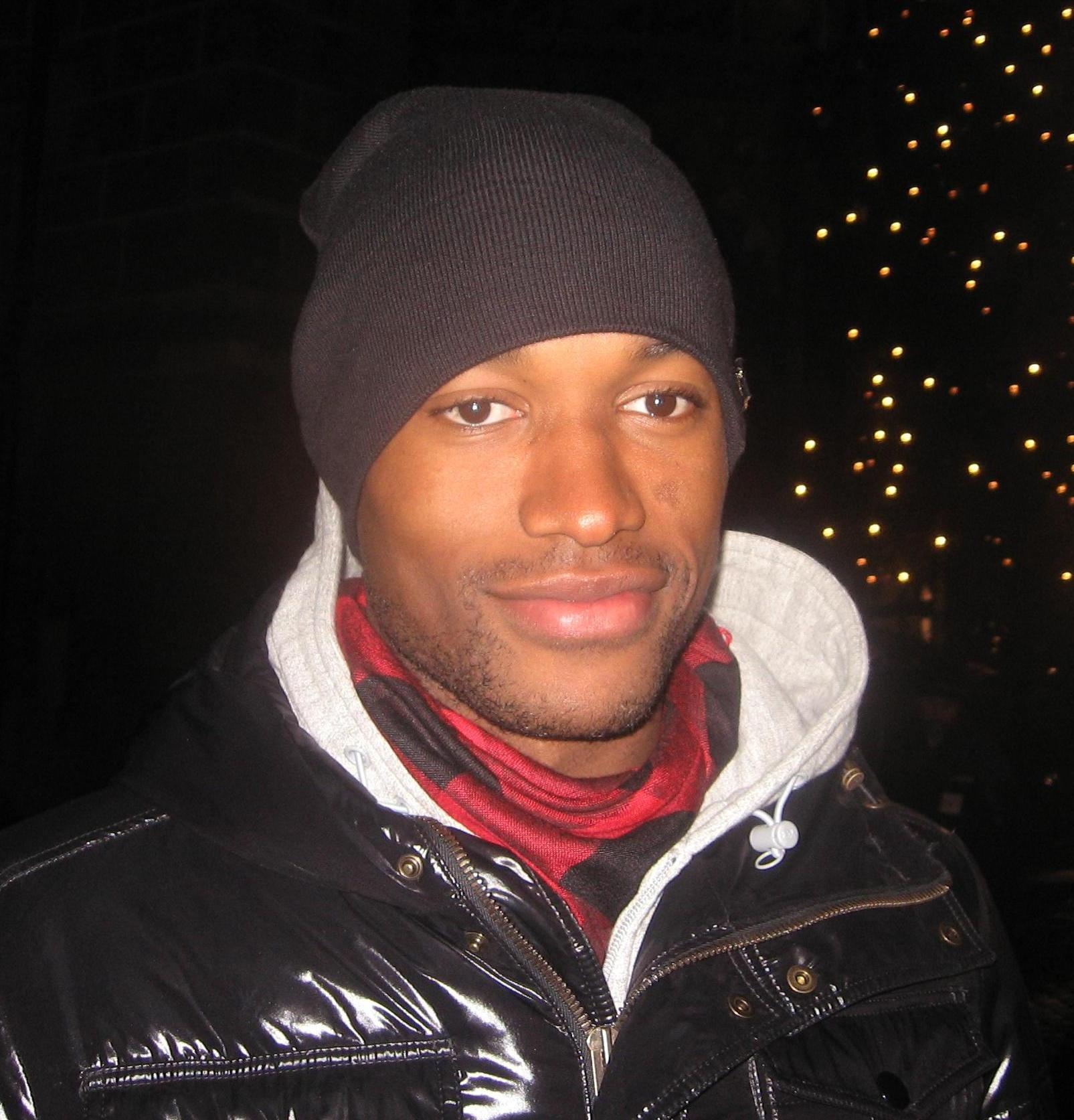
- Gonçalves in 2008

Personal information
- Full name: José Júlio Gomes Gonçalves
- Date of birth: 17 September 1985 (age 41)
- Place of birth: Lisbon, Portugal
- Height: 1.89 m (6 ft 2 in)
- Position: Defender

Youth career
- 2001: La Sallaz
- 2001–2002: Yverdon Sport
- 2002–2004: Basel

Senior career*
| Years | Team | Apps | (Gls) |
| 2004–2005 | Winterthur | 13 | (1) |
| 2005 | Venezia | 3 | (0) |
| 2005–2006 | Thun | 16 | (0) |
| 2006–2008 | Kaunas | 0 | (0) |
| 2006–2008 | → Hearts (loan) | 38 | (0) |
| 2008–2010 | Hearts | 20 | (2) |
| 2008–2009 | → 1. FC Nürnberg (loan) | 14 | (0) |
| 2011 | St. Gallen | 17 | (1) |
| 2011–2014 | Sion | 5 | (0) |
| 2013 | → New England Revolution (loan) | 34 | (2) |
| 2014–2016 | New England Revolution | 84 | (2) |
| 2017–2018 | NorthEast United | 15 | (0) |
| 2019–2021 | FC Zürich U21 | 31 | (2) |

International career
| 2006–2007 | Portugal U21 | 3 | (0) |
| 2006 | Portugal B | 3 | (0) |
- * Club domestic league appearances and goals as of 5 July 2022

José Júlio Gomes Gonçalves (born 17 September 1985) is a retired Portuguese professional footballer who played as a left back or central defender.

He started his career in Switzerland, moving to Scotland with Heart of Midlothian in 2006 and returning to the previous country after three seasons. He signed with Major League Soccer club New England Revolution in 2013, leaving three years later.

Gonçalves represented Portugal at the 2007 European Under-21 Championship.

== Club career ==
=== Early years ===
Born in Lisbon to Portuguese people of Cape Verdean descent, Gonçalves moved to Switzerland at the age of two. He joined FC Basel in 2002 at 17, but could never appear officially for the first team over the course of two seasons.

Gonçalves split 2004–05 between FC Winterthur (second division) and S.S.C. Venezia (Italy, Serie B), returning to Switzerland for one additional campaign, with FC Thun in the Super League; with the latter club he first competed in the UEFA Champions League, playing in all six group stage games in an eventual third-place finish, with the subsequent qualification to the UEFA Cup.

=== Heart of Midlothian ===
After a trial spell, Everton decided not to pursue their interest in Gonçalves, while Newcastle United, Rangers and Crystal Palace were all linked to the player in the press. In January 2006, however, it was Heart of Midlothian that eventually acquired him, in a deal that saw him signed by owner Vladimir Romanov's other club, FBK Kaunas, and then immediately loaned out to the Edinburgh side.

Gonçalves made his official debut for Hearts in a 3–0 win against Aberdeen in the 2005–06 Scottish Cup, although a series of injuries curtailed his appearances during his first year with the team. After a six-month lay-off to deal with hamstring, hip and toe complaints, he returned to action against Dunfermline Athletic on 18 October.

On 4 July 2008, Gonçalves signed a new contract with Hearts, being loaned to 1. FC Nürnberg from Germany on a season-long deal, with the 2. Bundesliga club having an option to sign him on a permanent deal. Despite the side boasting the best defensive record in the competition and earning promotion to the Bundesliga via the play-offs with an aggregate score of 5–0 against FC Energie Cottbus, his season was interrupted by injury and the Bavarians decided against signing him.

After featuring regularly for the Jambos in pre-season, Gonçalves made his first competitive appearance since his return in the team's opening fixture of 2009–10, a 2–0 defeat against Dundee United at Tannadice Park. He scored his first goal for Hearts on 30 August 2009, heading home in a 2–2 draw at St Johnstone.

Despite having an impressive first half of the season, Gonçalves was dropped from the team in January 2010, following the appointment of Jim Jefferies as manager. The latter stated the reason behind the former's omission from the squad was his refusal to sign a contract extension with the club, with his link due to expire at the end of the campaign. On 7 March 2010, he returned to the starting line-up in the 1–0 away defeat to Dundee United due to a number of injuries in the main squad, particularly in the defensive sector, and the coach confirmed after the game that he would not have selected the player if he had had enough fit players.

On 18 June 2010, it was announced on Gonçalves' personal website that his management was in talks with Rangers, and that he hoped to have his future resolved within the next two or three weeks. However, negotiations broke down, and he also underwent a knee operation in the summer. After leaving Hearts, Gonçalves reflects his time there, quoting: "I was in Scotland for four-and-a-half years and I had some great times. I only want the best for Hearts and I will always follow them, even when I stop playing because they are an old club of mine."

=== Return to Switzerland ===
On 16 January 2011, Gonçalves signed a 2 1/2-year contract with FC St. Gallen in the top division. He scored his first goal for his new team in a 3–2 friendly victory over FC Schaffhausen played the previous day. He made his competitive debut on 6 February, playing as a centre back in a 4–1 league defeat against Grasshoppers at the AFG Arena.

On 3 April 2011, upon his return from a one-game suspension, Gonçalves scored his first goal for St. Gallen in a 1–1 draw at FC Luzern. 17 days later, in his tenth official appearance, he earned his first win, a 3–1 victory over Grasshoppers at Letzigrund. He started in all the league games he appeared in, but could not help prevent the side's eventual relegation, as last.

On 10 June 2011, Gonçalves informed St. Gallen that he would be invoking a clause in his contract, which allowed him to sever ties with the club in the event of relegation, joining FC Sion shortly after. He was considered ineligible to play competitive football for his new team due to the sanctions imposed on it following the transfer of Essam El-Hadary in 2008; thus, he missed the start of the season.

Despite warnings from FIFA, Gonçalves was named on the bench on 13 August 2011 for a league match against Luzern, but did not appear in the game. He made his debut for Sion against Celtic, in a 0–0 away draw for the Europa League play-off round five days later; his league debut arrived still in the month, in a 2–0 victory at Lausanne-Sport.

=== New England Revolution ===
On 3 January 2013, Gonçalves moved on loan with the New England Revolution. His first competitive appearance took place on 9 March in a 1–0 win against the Chicago Fire Soccer Club, and he scored his first goal for them off a header in a 2–0 win over the Columbus Crew, on 20 July.

On 12 October 2013, according to MLSSoccer.com's Power Rankings editors, Gonçalves had "perhaps the best game any defender has played in MLS this season", scoring once and guiding the defense to a crucial 1–0 shutout of the Montreal Impact to keep the Revolution's playoff hopes afloat. The following week, in the side's last home game of the year, a 3–2 win over the Crew that secured the final playoff spot with one game left, he was given the Man of the Year award by the Midnight Riders supporters group; that same night, he was honored with the Best Defender award by the team.

Gonçalves was the only player to play every single minute for his team during the season. On 22 November 2013, the club exercised the purchase option on his loan from Sion and exercised his 2014 contract option to keep him for the next year.

In January 2017, Gonçalves' contract expired and the Revolution did not express interest in renewing it.

=== NorthEast United ===
On 13 September 2017, Gonçalves signed for Indian Super League franchise NorthEast United FC.

=== FC Zürich U21 ===
In the beginning of 2019, Gonçalves joined FC Zürich and was going to play for their U21 / reserve team. In March 2019 he said in an interview: I'm here to mentor these young people, to help them progress. He also revealed, that he had just passed his CAS (Certitifcat of Advanced Studies) in Sports Management at the University of St. Gallen. After retiring from professional football he became team manager at FC Zürich in September 2021.

== International career ==
Gonçalves was eligible to represent Cape Verde, Portugal and Switzerland at international level. He chose to play for the second, earning three caps for the under-21 side and representing the nation at the 2007 UEFA European Championship, appearing 57 minutes in the 0–0 group stage draw to Belgium in an eventual group stage exit.

On 31 September 2009, after solid displays for Hearts, Gonçalves earned a place in Carlos Queiroz's provisional Portugal squad for the 2010 FIFA World Cup qualifiers against Hungary and Malta. However, he missed out on the final list of 22.

== Personal life ==
Gonçalves speaks six languages in total – Italian, French, German, Portuguese, English and Spanish.

== Honours ==
Individual

- MLS Defender of the Year / MLS Best XI: 2013
- Midnight Riders Man of the Year: 2013
