= Paulo Dos Santos (Cape Verdean footballer) =

Cape Verdean association football player

Personal information
- Date of birth: 13 November 1973 (age 52)
- Place of birth: São Vicente, Cape Verde
- Height: 5 ft 9 in (1.75 m)
- Position: Midfielder

College career
Years	Team	Apps	(Gls)
1993–1995	Rhode Island Rams		

Senior career*
Years	Team	Apps	(Gls)
1996	New England Revolution	0	(0)
1996	→ Rhode Island Stingrays (loan)		(4)
1997	Connecticut Wolves	26	(3)
1998	Rhode Island Stingrays	?	(11)
1999	New England Revolution	16	(0)
1999	→ New Hampshire Phantoms (loan)	1	(0)
1999	→ Rhode Island Stingrays (loan)	0	(0)
1999	→ Boston Bulldogs (loan)	2	(1)
2000	Boston Bulldogs	17	(2)
2002–2005	Aalesund		
2006	FK Haugesund	24	(6)
2007	Hødd		
- * Club domestic league appearances and goals

Paulo Dos Santos (born 13 November 1973 in São Vicente, Cape Verde) is a Cape Verdean soccer midfielder who played two seasons with the New England Revolution in Major League Soccer, four seasons in the USISL and six seasons in Norway.

== Youth ==
Dos Santos, a native of the Cape Verde Islands, moved to Brockton, Massachusetts when he was sixteen. He attended the University of Rhode Island, playing on the men's soccer team from 1993 to 1995. He finished his two seasons with the Rams with twenty-two goals and seventeen assists in thirty-nine games. He graduated in 1997.

== Professional ==
On 4 March 1996, the New England Revolution selected Dos Santos in the 3rd round (26th overall) of the 1996 MLS College Draft. He spent the season with the Revs, but never entered a game and was waived on 7 November 1996. In February 1997, the Tampa Bay Mutiny selected Dos Santos in the 2nd round (18th overall) of the 1997 MLS Supplemental Draft. The Mutiny waived him before the season and on 15 April 1997, the Connecticut Wolves of the USISL signed Dos Santos. The team released him on 13 February 1998. He then moved to the Rhode Island Stingrays where he was a USISL D-3 All Star. In the winter of 1998–1999, he briefly played for an unknown team in the Cape Verde before returning to work in real estate in Rhode Island. On 12 March 1999, he was brought back into the New England Revolution by Steve Nichols. Nichols used him in sixteen games and he also played part of the season on loan with the Boston Bulldogs. On 14 March 2000, the Revolution waived Dos Santos and in April 2000 he signed with the Boston Bulldogs. In 2002, he moved to Aalesunds FK in the Norwegian First Division. In 2003, the team moved up to the Tippeligaen but was back in the First Division in 2004 and was promoted back to the Tippeligaen in 2005. Dos Santos remained with the team through those moves. He moved to FK Haugesund for the 2006 season. In the summer of 2007, he moved to Hødd as a free agent. The team released him after the season and he moved to Cape Verde.
