= Tom McLaughlin (soccer) =

American soccer player

Personal information
- Full name: Thomas J. McLaughlin III
- Date of birth: September 12, 1976 (age 50)
- Place of birth: Harleysville, Pennsylvania, U.S.
- Height: 5 ft 10 in (1.78 m)
- Position: Forward

Youth career
- 1994–1997: Harvard Crimson

Senior career*
Years	Team	Apps	(Gls)
1998	New England Revolution	1	(0)
1998	Worcester Wildfire	9	(1)
- * Club domestic league appearances and goals

Thomas J. McLaughlin is an American retired soccer forward who played professionally in the USISL and Major League Soccer.

== Youth ==
McLaughlin graduated from La Salle College High School in 1993. He played soccer for FC Delco from 1991 to 1996. He attended the Harvard University, playing on the men's soccer team from 1993 to 1997. McLaughlin was the 1997 Ivy League Player of the Year.

== Professional ==
On February 1, 1998, the New England Revolution selected McLaughlin in the third round (thirty-sixth overall) of the 1998 MLS College Draft. He played one game for the Revolution before being released on June 30, 1998. He then signed with the Worcester Wildfire for the remainder of the 1998 USISL A-League season.
