= Kevin Coye =

American soccer player

Personal information
- Date of birth: July 19, 1975 (age 51)
- Place of birth: United States
- Height: 6 ft 0 in (1.83 m)
- Position: Defender

Youth career
- 1994–1997: UCLA Bruins

Senior career*
Years	Team	Apps	(Gls)
1998	New England Revolution	0	(0)
1998	→ Worcester Wildfire (loan)	1	(0)
1998	→ MLS Pro 40 (loan)	2	(0)
1998	Orange County Zodiac	3	(0)
1999	Cape Cod Crusaders	2	(0)
1999	Boston Bulldogs	6	(0)
- * Club domestic league appearances and goals

Kevin Coye (born July 19, 1975) is an American retired soccer defender who played professionally in the USISL.

Growing up, Coye played his club soccer with the North Huntington Beach Futbol Club. In 1993, he graduated from Ocean View High School. He attended UCLA, playing on the men's soccer team from 1994 to 1997. Coye and his teammates won the 1997 NCAA Division I Men's Soccer Championship. In February 1998, the New England Revolution selected Coye in the third round (twenty-ninth overall) of the 1998 MLS College Draft. The Revolution sent him on loan to both MLS Pro 40 and the Worcester Wildfire before waiving him on June 6, 1998. In July, Coye played for the Boston Bulldogs. In August 1998, Coye joined the Orange County Zodiac. In 1999, Coye began the season with the Cape Cod Crusaders and finished it with the Boston Bulldogs.

Kevin is a lover of podcasts and attributes this platform fixation from his brothers-in-law. One of his brothers-in-law is a wine executive, who Kevin has been quoted as saying, “He’s my guiding light and my moral compass!”
