= Jesse Van Saun =

American soccer player (born 1976)

Personal information
- Date of birth: April 20, 1976 (age 50)
- Place of birth: Hillsdale, New Jersey, United States
- Height: 5 ft 9 in (1.75 m)
- Positions: Midfielder; defender

Youth career
- 1994–1997: St. John's Red Storm

Senior career*
Years	Team	Apps	(Gls)
1998	New England Revolution	5	(0)
1998	→ Worcester Wildfire (loan)	1	(0)
1998	→ Connecticut Wolves (loan)	3	(0)
1998	→ Project 40 (loan)	6	(0)
1999	Kansas City Wizards	0	(0)
1999	→ Project 40 (loan)	13	(0)
2000	Long Island Rough Riders	15	(1)
2002	New York Freedom	18	(1)
- * Club domestic league appearances and goals

Jesse Van Saun (born 1976) is an American retired soccer player who played professionally in Major League Soccer and USISL.

Van Saun grew up in Hillsdale, New Jersey and graduated from Pascack Valley High School. He played soccer with the Brooklyn Italians youth team. He attended St. John's University where he was part of the school's 1996 NCAA Men's Division I Soccer Championship-winning team. On February 1, 1998, the New England Revolution selected Van Saun in the second round (seventeenth overall) of the 1998 MLS College Draft. He played five games for the Revolution and went on loan to the Worcester Wildfire of the USISL in April. He struggled with injuries including an abdominal strain and hospitalization due to dehydration. In August, he went on loan with the Project 40 team. When the Revolution signed Tony Kuhn in April 1999, they waived Van Saun to free up a roster spot. Two days later the Chicago Fire claimed Van Saun off waivers. On May 6, 1999, the Fire traded him to the Kansas City Wizards in exchange for Ryan Tinsley. His problems with heat stroke continued with the Wizards. In July 1999, he went on loan for two games with Project 40. The Wizards waived him in November 1999. In 2000, he played for the Long Island Rough Riders. In 2002, he played for the New York Freedom.
