= Nigel Boulton =

Welsh footballer and manager

Personal information
- Date of birth: 23 August 1953 (age 73)
- Place of birth: Cardiff, Wales
- Positions: Defender; midfielder

Youth career
- Trelai Youth

Senior career*
Years	Team	Apps	(Gls)
1980-1986	Sully		

Managerial career
- 1988–1989: Sully
- 1992–1994: Arkansas A's
- 1997: Worcester Wildfire
- 2003–2015: William Carey University
- 2015–2021: Southern States Soccer
- * Club domestic league appearances and goals

Nigel Boulton is a Welsh retired footballer and coach active in the United States.

== Playing and early coaching career ==
Boulton played semi-professionally for Sully a three-time Wales Premier League champion and three-time Senior Cup Winner. In 1986, Boulton joined the coaching ranks at Sully as reserve team coach. In spring of 1988 he replaced Les Dickerson as first team coach and in the 1988-89 season led the club to second place in its division. He also led the South Wales representative (All-Star) team to back-to-back J.J. Baily Trophy wins against English leagues opposition in 1987 and 1988. Boulton was appointed a District Coach for the F.A. of Wales in 1988.

== Coaching in the U.S. ==
In the summer of 1989, Soccer USA hired Boulton and he moved to the United States. Following an 18-month stint with Soccer USA, Boulton assumed the roles of executive director and director of coaching for the Arkansas State Soccer Association. Former US President, Bill Clinton appointed Boulton to the Governor's Council on Physical Fitness & Sports in 1994. During his time in Arkansas he part-owned and coached the USISL franchise the Arkansas A's from 1992 to 1994. In 1997, Boulton left Arkansas to become the head coach of the Boston-based Worcester Wildfire of the USISL A-League, the forerunner of today's USL Championship. At that time the Wildfire were the farm team for Major League Soccer's New England Revolution under Thomas Rongen, The following year, Boulton moved back to the south where he became the Mississippi Youth Soccer Association's statewide Director of Coaching. As a DOC in both Arkansas and in Mississippi, the United States Soccer Federation had named Boulton a national scout for the Project 2010 program and as a national course instructor for the training of coaches. He was also a member of the Olympic Development Program regional and state staff for many years.

== College years ==
In March 2003, William Carey University hired Boulton as its men's soccer coach. He was named G.C.A.C. Coach of the Year the first year. His team won the G.C.A.C. Championship in 2007. The following year, 2008, he recorded his 50th collegiate career win as his team won the G.C.A.C regular-season title and he was again named G.C.A.C. Coach of the Year. In 2009, he was named GCAC Coach of the Year for a third time as his team again took the regular-season title finishing ranked #9 in the NAIA National Poll and also qualifying for the national championship tournament. In 2010 Carey again qualified for the national championship tournament. In 2011 Boulton's team reached the semi-final stage of the NAIA national championship tournament and were placed at #4 in the post-season national rankings. Boulton was also named a National Soccer Coaches Association of America National Coach of the Year finalist, regional winner and NAIA Regional Coach of the Year. In 2012 Boulton recorded his 100th collegiate career win. He went on to rack up a career total of 134 wins.

== Founder of Southern States Soccer ==
In 2015 Along with a small group of committed investors and Carl Reynolds, his former college assistant at Carey, Boulton founded Southern States Soccer leaving William Carey University after 12 years. The organization based in Hattiesburg, Mississippi has since grown from an initial three teams to a full-service Club with an Academy for both boys and girls. Reynolds headed the Academy as Director of Coaching. Boulton retired from coaching within the youth set-up in 2021 following the COVID upheaval. The original group of committed investors were joined by Reynolds and his parents as owners and still run the club, now part of the MLS Next set-up.

== Southern States Soccer Club Stars ==
Boulton acted as general manager of the club's NPSL team, the Stars, founded in 2021 until his retirement from soccer in 2023. Boulton's former college assistant and NAIA All-American player Carl Reynolds continues as the academy director and head coach of the Stars.
