= The Rebellion (MLS supporters association) =

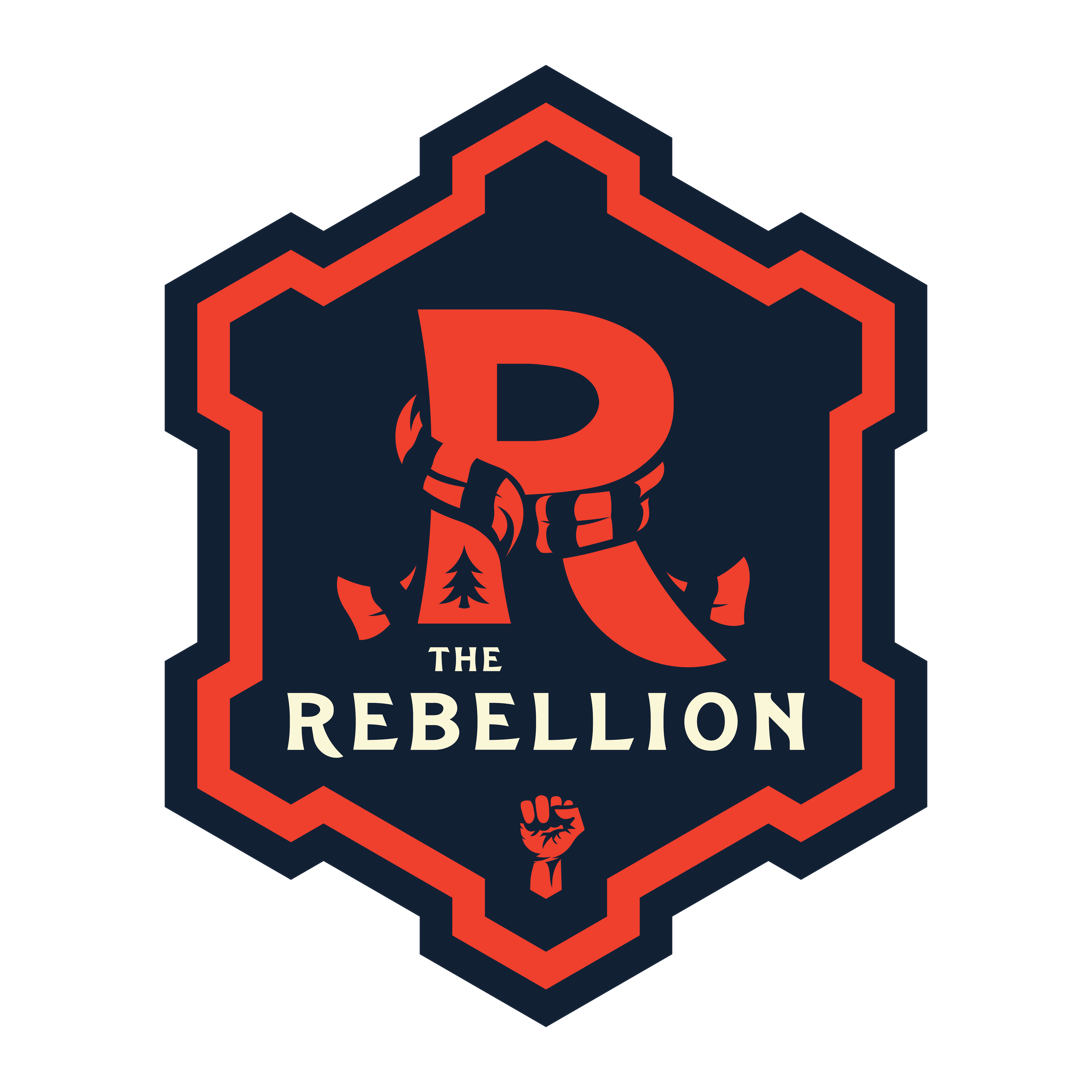
- Logo of The Rebellion, an independent supporters group of the New England Revolution
- Established: 2010
- Type: Supporters group
- Team: New England Revolution
- Location: Foxborough, Massachusetts, U.S.
- Arena: Gillette Stadium
- Stand: Sections 141, 142, 143
- Membership: 400+
- Colors: Blue, red

The Rebellion is the independent supporters group for the New England Revolution of Major League Soccer. The main intent of The Rebellion is to organize, unite, strengthen, and increase support for the New England Revolution. The group is an 501c7 organization. The Rebellion's goal is to support the Revolution at every match by “cheering, singing, ranting, raving, and screaming" for the Revolution in order to create a loud and intimidating atmosphere at Gillette Stadium. The group hosts watch parties for away matches at several New England restaurants and bars. Additionally the group hosts tailgates in Gillette's lot 3B prior to each home match.

== The Fort ==
The majority of Rebellion members sit in the North Stands of the stadium (Sections 141, 142, and 143 of Gillette Stadium) in an area dubbed "The Fort". The Fort is a general admission section and draws its name from the revolutionary theme which runs through the team and independent supporters' associations. The Fort is open to all supporters of the New England Revolution who want to support their team by singing, chanting, shouting, standing, waving flags, and doing so in the company of other like-minded fans. The other Revolution supporters' group, The Midnight Riders, also stand in The Fort. Chants are led by a "capo", an individual standing with their back to the game who conducts the supporters groups.

== History ==
Formed in 2010, The Rebellion takes its name from the unique role New England played in the rebellion that led to the American Revolution, and a desire to cause a rebellion in New England soccer culture.

In 2017, members of the Rebellion collaborated with Big D and the Kids Table to record a song that would be played at Revolution matches.

In 2020 The Rebellion launched a fundraising campaign titled "Rebels for a Cause" that raised north of $7,000 for COVID-19 economic relief. The effort was originally focused on the group's official supporter's bar The Brass Monkey but was then extended towards others in the group seeking relief.

In 2022, The Rebellion formed a partnership with former radio show turned podcast Revolution Recap, a weekly podcast discussing recent New England Revolution news, signings and matches, with an occasional interview of current and former players. Previous guests include Jay Heaps, Christina Unkel, Shalrie Joseph, Jeff Larentowicz, Henry Kessler, and DeJuan Jones.

== The Supporter's Cup ==
Since 2018, The Rebellion have participated in an 11v11, one-off soccer match against the Revolution's other largest supporter's group, The Midnight Riders. The event is aimed at raising funds through ticket sales, attendance, and merchandise sales. A portion of profits are donated to the preferred charities of both groups.

Past Matches
Year	Winning team	Score	Losing team	Notes
2018	Rebellion	3-1	Midnight Riders	
2019	Rebellion	4-3	Midnight Riders	After extra time
2020	N/A	N/A	N/A	Cancelled due to COVID-19 Pandemic
2021	N/A	N/A	N/A	Cancelled due to COVID-19 Pandemic
2022	Rebellion	8-5	Midnight Riders	Video on Rebellion Instagram
2023	Rebellion	5-2	Midnight Riders	Played indoors after Riders requested change

== Ray Sullivan Unsung Hero Award ==
Starting in 2021, The Rebellion have presented the "Ray Sullivan Unsung Hero Award" to a Revolution supporter that has gone "above and beyond the call of duty" and "puts others before themselves." The award was created to honor the life and memory of Ray Sullivan, a Revolution supporter, and American Politician who served as a Democratic Party (United States) member in the Rhode Island House of Representatives. Working with the Obama administration, Sullivan was hired as executive director of Marriage Equality Rhode Island, a 501(c)(4) organization. He actively worked to support full marriage equality instead of a "discriminatory" civil unions bill.

Past Winners:
Years	Name
2021	Tim Batzinger
2022	David Rodriguez
2023	Barrett Ison
