= Ted Chronopoulos =

American soccer player and coach

Personal information
- Full name: Ted Chronopoulos
- Date of birth: September 16, 1972 (age 54)
- Place of birth: Loma Linda, California, United States
- Height: 6 ft 0 in (1.83 m)
- Positions: Midfielder; defender

Youth career
- 1990–1991: Cal State San Bernardino
- 1993: San Diego State

Senior career*
| Years | Team | Apps | (Gls) |
| 1993–1996 | Panionios | 47 | (7) |
| 1996–2002 | New England Revolution | 144 | (16) |
| 2002 | MetroStars | 18 | (0) |
| 2003–2005 | Charleston Battery | 57 | (13) |
| 2004–2005 | Chicago Storm (indoor) | 19 | (2) |

International career
| 1997 | United States | 1 | (0) |

Managerial career
- 2005: Charleston Battery (assistant)
- * Club domestic league appearances and goals

Ted Chronopoulos (born September 16, 1972) is an American former soccer player. He spent three seasons in the Greek First Division, seven seasons in Major League Soccer, three in the USL First Division and one in Major Indoor Soccer League. He also earned one cap with the United States national team.

== Playing ==
=== High school and college ===
Chronopoulos grew up in Rialto, California, graduating from Eisenhower High School in 1990. That fall, he entered California State University, San Bernardino, and spent two seasons with the Coyotes before transferring to San Diego State University for the 1993 season.

=== Greece ===
In 1993, Chronopoulos left San Diego State to sign with Greek First Division club Panionios. He spent three seasons in Greece, seeing time in forty-seven first team games.

=== MLS ===
On February 7, 1996, the New England Revolution of Major League Soccer selected Chronopoulos in the fifth round (forty-fifth overall) of the 1996 Inaugural Draft. He scored his first goal for the Revolution on July 11, 1996 against the Columbus Crew. In the 1999 New England Revolution season, Chronopoulos lead the team in matches played (31) as well as matches started. He earned MLS Player of the Week honors during the 11th week of the 2000 Major League Soccer season after scoring a brace in the Revolution's 2-1 home win over the LA Galaxy on May 24.

On May 24, 2002, the Revs sent Chronopoulos, Andy Williams, and Mamadou Diallo to the MetroStars in exchange for Daniel Hernandez, Diego Serna and Brian Kamler. He played eighteen games with the MetroStars before being put on waivers on November 5, 2002.

=== USL ===
Choronopolous signed with the Charleston Battery of the USL First Division on February 10, 2003. He spent three seasons with the Battery, earning second-team All-Star honors in 2003. That year, he also scored one of the Battery's three goals in its championship victory over the Minnesota Thunder.

=== MISL ===
On August 10, 2004, Chronopoulos signed with the Chicago Storm of Major Indoor Soccer League. While he was selected as team captain, he suffered from several injuries during the season. He retired from playing professionally in September 2005.

=== National team ===
Chronopoulos earned one cap with the U.S. national team, taking part in a 2–1 win over Israel on June 17, 1997. He came on for Jeff Agoos in the seventy-first minute.

== Coaching ==
Throughout his playing career, Chronopoulos served as a trainer or coach for numerous youth teams. In 2005, he was also an assistant coach with the Charleston Battery. Chronopoulos also served as Director of Chivas USA youth academy. In 2013 he and Dan Calichman filed a lawsuit against Chivas USA arguing that they were fired because they were not Latino and did not speak Spanish. With an USSF 'A' License, Chronopoulos is currently the Director of Soccer for The Pateadores, a premier youth soccer organization based in Southern California.

In August 2010, Teddy joined the New York Cosmos (2010) in the role of Director of The Cosmos Academy with a focus on developing world class youth talent.

== Honors ==
Individual

- MLS All-Star: 1997
