= Mike Burns (soccer) =

American soccer player (born 1970)

Personal information
- Full name: Michael Thomas Burns
- Date of birth: September 14, 1970 (age 56)
- Place of birth: Marlborough, Massachusetts, United States
- Height: 5 ft 9 in (1.75 m)
- Position: Defender

Youth career
- 1988–1991: Hartwick College

Senior career*
Years	Team	Apps	(Gls)
1995	→ Viborg (loan)	15	(0)
1996–2000	New England Revolution	108	(3)
2000	San Jose Earthquakes	18	(0)
2001–2002	Kansas City Wizards	43	(0)
Total		184	(3)

International career
1992–1998	United States	75	(0)
Medal record
Representing United States
Runner-up	CONCACAF Gold Cup	1998
Third place	CONCACAF Gold Cup	1996
Men's Soccer
- * Club domestic league appearances and goals

Michael Thomas Burns (born September 14, 1970) is an American former soccer player. During his playing career, he played for Danish club Viborg FF, three MLS teams, as well as the United States national team.

Burns is currently the sporting director for Major League Soccer club Sporting Kansas City.

== Career ==
=== Youth ===
Burns was born and raised in Marlborough, Massachusetts. At age six, he began playing soccer in local recreation leagues, but never joined a club team. When he reached high school, he played for Marlborough High School boys' team and was named the 1987 Massachusetts High School Player of the Year.

After completing high school, he attended Hartwick College from 1988 to 1991. When he graduated from Hartwick, there were few opportunities for playing soccer professionally in the United States, but Burns continued to play with the U.S. Olympic team as it prepared for the 1992 Summer Olympics. He previously played in the 1987 U16 FIFA World Cup and in the 1989 U-20 FIFA World Cup. The 1989 squad took fourth place in the tournament.

=== Professional ===
In 1995, Major League Soccer began an expansion plan to add new teams to the league. On October 17, 1995, during the 1996 MLS Inaugural Allocations, MLS assigned Burns and Alexi Lalas to the New England Revolution. In August 1995, MLS loaned out Burns to Danish club Viborg FF. The Revolution retained his rights and Burns returned to play for the Revolution in 1996. Burns made 17 total appearances for the Revolution in their inaugural campaign, making his debut in the Revolution's first-ever match on April 13, a 3-2 loss to the Tampa Bay Mutiny. Burns received the first yellow card in Revolution history in the 16th minute of the game. He scored his first goal for the club on June 6, giving the Revolution a 78th minute lead against the LA Galaxy in front of 20,236 fans at Foxboro Stadium. In the 1997 New England Revolution season, Burns led the Revolution in games played, starting all 32 league matches. He also scored the Revolution's first-ever playoff goal, on October 5 in the 89th minute of a 4-1 loss to D.C. United in the 1997 MLS Cup Playoffs. In 1998 New England Revolution season, Burns earned a place in the MLS All-Star game. He was also named 1998 New England Revolution Defender of the Year. In May 1998, Burns and teammate Joe-Max Moore were named to the US 1998 FIFA World Cup squad. Both would return to the Revolution on June 27.

In the 1999 off-season, he made several attempts to move back to a European club, trying out with clubs such as Utrecht, Bolton and Hearts. None of the clubs expressed interest in him and Burns returned to the Revolution. On May 30, 2000, the Revolution traded Burns, Dan Calichman, and a first round draft pick in the 2001 MLS SuperDraft to the San Jose Earthquakes in exchange for Mauricio Wright.

Burns finished the 2000 season with the Earthquakes. However, he did not remain with the team and he was traded in March 2001 to the Kansas City Wizards in return for conditional picks in the 2002 MLS SuperDraft.

Burns played two seasons with the Wizards, 2001 and 2002. In 2002, he was chosen to play in the 2002 MLS All-Star Game. At the end of the 2002 season, Burns announced his retirement from professional soccer.

=== Post-Professional ===
On April 10, 2005, Burns was named as the New England Revolution's Director of Soccer. He held this position until 2008, when he was promoted to Vice President of Player Personnel. On November 9, 2011, he was promoted to the General Manager position.

Burns was dismissed by New England on May 13, 2019.

On June 28, 2024, Burns was named Sporting Director for Sporting Kansas City of Major League Soccer.

== National team ==
Burns competed in a major tournament on every level: in the U-17 World Championship in 1987, the World Youth Championship in 1989, the Pan American Games in 1991, the Olympic Games in 1992, and the FIFA World Cup, where he was a non-playing squad member in 1994 and then played in 1998.

== Honors ==
Individual

- MLS All-Star, 1998
