= Joe-Max Moore =

American soccer player (born 1971)

Personal information
- Full name: Joe-Max Moore
- Date of birth: February 23, 1971 (age 55)
- Place of birth: Tulsa, Oklahoma, United States
- Height: 5 ft 7 in (1.70 m)
- Position: Forward

College career
Years	Team	Apps	(Gls)
1989–1992	UCLA Bruins	65	(38)

Senior career*
Years	Team	Apps	(Gls)
1994–1995	1. FC Saarbrücken	25	(13)
1995–1996	1. FC Nürnberg	27	(8)
1996–1999	New England Revolution	77	(37)
1997	→ C.S. Emelec (loan)	?	(1)
1999–2002	Everton	52	(8)
2003–2004	New England Revolution	20	(4)
Total		213	(82)

International career
1992–2002	United States	100	(24)
Medal record
Representing United States
Runner-up	CONCACAF Gold Cup	1993
Runner-up	CONCACAF Gold Cup	1998
Third place	CONCACAF Gold Cup	1996
Men's Soccer
Pan American Games
Gold medal – first place	1991 Havana	Team
- * Club domestic league appearances and goals

Joe-Max Moore (born February 23, 1971) is an American former professional soccer player who played as a forward for various clubs in Germany and England in addition to two separate tenures at Major League Soccer side New England Revolution, where he retired.

Moore also served as vice-captain of the U.S. national team, scoring 24 goals in 100 international appearances between 1992 and 2002. During those years, he appeared at three consecutive FIFA World Cups in 1994 (on home soil), 1998 and 2002, as well as the 1992 Barcelona Olympics.

On April 4, 2013, Moore was elected to the National Soccer Hall of Fame.

== Early life ==
Moore was born in Tulsa, Oklahoma, the son of Corey Moore, and Tulsa oil man and business man, Carl Moore. Moore's father also happened to be a part-owner of the Tulsa Roughnecks of the North American Soccer League. He moved to Irvine, California when he was 14, and played boys' soccer at Mission Viejo High School where he was a four-year starter. Heavily recruited out of high school, he chose to play NCAA soccer at UCLA. While at UCLA, he played with future national team teammates Brad Friedel, Chris Henderson and Cobi Jones. As a freshman, he scored 11 goals, assisted on ten others and was named to the Soccer America's All-Freshman team. That year, UCLA won the NCAA championship, defeating Rutgers in penalty kicks. As a sophomore, he earned second team All-American honors and was a first team All-American as a junior. That season, his final year with UCLA, he led the team in scoring. At the end of his three-year collegiate career, he had scored a total of 38 goals and assisted on 24 others in 65 games.

Moore was inducted into the UCLA Athletics Hall of Fame on October 11, 2014.

== Career ==
=== Years in Germany ===
In July 1994, USSF loaned Moore to German Second Division club 1. FC Saarbrücken. At the time, Moore was a part of the U.S. team at the 1994 FIFA World Cup, but did not appear in any matches. With a lull in national team games following the World Cup, USSF decided to move several players overseas. Saarbrücken would end up buying Moore's contract from USSF for $250,000. In Moore's single season with Saarbrücken, he played 25 games, leading the club with 13 goals. At the end of the season, Saarbrücken transferred Moore to fellow Second Division club 1. FC Nürnberg. He again led his team in scoring with eight goals.

=== New England Revolution ===
In 1996, Major League Soccer (MLS) was in the process of building teams for its upcoming first season. As part of that process, MLS attempted to ensure an initial equitable distribution of talent across each of its teams. It did this by allocating known players to each team. MLS allocated Giuseppe Galderisi to the New England Revolution. However, he showed up injured and played poorly through his first four games, so MLS replaced him with Moore on the Revolution roster on July 24, 1996.

Moore had an exceptional four-year tenure with the Revolution collecting numerous MLS and Team awards. Aside from an injury marred 1997 season, in which he only played 11 games, scoring four goals, he consistently produced for the club. Moore finished the 1996 New England Revolution season as the team's inaugural scoring champion, with 11 goals and 1 assist. He was named the Revolution's first-ever Team MVP. He was also the first member of the Revolution to be named to the MLS Team of the Week. Moore made his first appearance for the Revolution on July 27 in a 4–2 loss to the Kansas City Wizards. He scored his first Revolution goal on July 31, recording a brace against the San Jose Clash.

During his tenure with the Revolution, Moore became the club's all-time leading scorer and made the 1999 MLS All Star team. He was again named Revolution Team MVP in 1998 New England Revolution season, and 1999 New England Revolution season, and finished as the Revolution's scoring champion again in 1999.

His success with the Revs led him to pursue a return to Europe, this time with Everton F.C. in the English FA Premier League.

=== Emelec ===
In November–December 1997, Moore spent a month on loan from the Revs to Club Sport Emelec of the Ecuadorian First Division following the end of the MLS season where he yearned to be close to his family recently residing in Tulsa, Oklahoma. He was not the only MLS player with Emelec, as Alexi Lalas joined him during the loan.

=== Everton ===
On November 11, 1999, Moore signed with Everton F.C., in the English FA Premier League on a free transfer, after he impressed the Everton staff during a seven-day October tryout.

At the time, Moore did not have permission from MLS to work out with any team but the Revolution. Despite this, MLS placed no barriers in the way of Moore's free transfer. The contract with Everton, good for three and a half years, would pay Moore approximately $600,000 per season.

On December 28, 1999, Moore made his first appearance for Walter Smith's side, in a 0–0 draw against Bradford City A.F.C. He went on an impressive run over the course of the following two months. On January 15, 2000, Moore scored his first goal for Everton, in a home 2–2 draw against Tottenham Hotspur. He tallied 3 more goals in the following four league matches, notching against Wimbledon F.C., Derby County F.C., and West Ham United F.C. He added two more goals in FA Cup Play during this period notching against Preston North End F.C. and Aston Villa F.C. on January 29 and February 20 respectively.

He scored his first brace for the club on April 1, 2000, in a 4–2 victory over Watford F.C. Despite this run, he slowly became less and less effective, failing to record a single goal in Everton's 2000–01 Everton F.C. season despite making 21 appearances.

Moore tallied again for The Toffies on December 15, 2001, recording the game-winner against Derby County. His goal against Leeds United F.C. the following matchday would prove to be his last for the club. The final straw came at the end of 2002. Moore had suffered a knee injury in the U.S. game against Portugal at the 2002 FIFA World Cup and did not play for Everton in the next season. On December 12, 2002, his contract with Everton terminated "by mutual consent."

=== Return to the Revolution ===
When he returned to New England from Everton in 2003, signing on January 28. he was a much changed player. He had suffered from several injuries while in England which hampered his playing time when he came back to the Revs.

However, he still managed to score four goals in 16 games during the 2003 season. Moore recorded the first goal of his Revolution return in the 12th minute of the Revolution's 2–1 win over the Dallas Burn on April 28. In 2004, his last season with the team, he played in only three games, failing to score a goal, before spraining ligaments in his knee. He was out for most of the rest of the season, but planned to return for the 2005 season. However, he re-injured his knee during a January 2005 pre-season mini-camp.

Moore had reconstructive surgery on his right knee for a damaged medial collateral ligament on January 25, 2005. Two days later, he announced his retirement from professional soccer, saying, "After numerous attempts to strengthen and stabilize my knee through rehab, it became clear that I had no alternative but to have reconstructive surgery. Considering my age and the recovery time necessary, I have decided to end my playing career."

In his six years in MLS, Moore scored 41 goals and added 35 assists for 111 points, the assists and points being Rev records through the 2004 season. However, Taylor Twellman has since passed Moore on the Rev's points lists.

== National team ==
Moore began playing for the U.S. national team while in college. In 1989, he was part of the U-20 team which placed fifth at the 1989 FIFA World Youth Championship. Two years later, he scored the winning goal against Mexico in the Pan American Games championship game. Moore also made the 1992 Barcelona Olympics, where the U.S. went 1–1–1 and failed to advance from the group stage.

After the 1992 college season ended, Moore signed with the U.S. national team. Beginning in 1988, the United States Soccer Federation (USSF) had begun to sign top U.S. players to contracts, making the U.S. national team a de facto professional club. USSF would then loan out U.S. players to club team, recalling them for national team games. Moore chose to not return to UCLA for his senior year and joined USSF as a full-time national team player.

Moore's first appearance for the US national team came against Canada on September 3, 1992. He was part of the U.S. roster for the 1994 but didn't appear in a match and also the 1998, 2002 FIFA World Cup rosters, appearing in both tournaments. Moore became the sixth U.S. player to earn 100 caps, doing so against Poland in the team's 2002 World Cup group finale.

His 24 goals for the U.S. rank him seventh in national history, behind Landon Donovan, Clint Dempsey, Eric Wynalda, Brian McBride, Christian Pulisic and Jozy Altidore. On January 27, 2006, Moore was inducted into the Oklahoma Soccer Hall of Fame.

=== Year-by-year national team appearances/goals ===
As of match played June 14, 2002.

National team	Year	Apps	Starts	Goals	Assists
United States
United States	1992	1	1	0	1
United States	1993	23	12	8	4
United States	1994	11	7	1	1
United States	1995	7	6	2	1
United States	1996	11	9	4	0
United States	1997	5	5	1	1
United States	1998	13	11	1	2
United States	1999	8	4	3	0
United States	2000	4	4	2	2
United States	2001	9	6	2	0
United States	2002	8	2	0	2
Total		100	67	24	14

=== International goals ===
#	Date	Venue	Opponent	Score	Result	Competition
1	January 30, 1993	Tempe, Arizona	Denmark	2–2	2–2	Friendly
2	April 9, 1993	Riyadh, Saudi Arabia	Saudi Arabia	1–0	2–0	Friendly
3	November 14, 1993	Mission Viejo, California	Cayman Islands	2–0	8–1	Friendly
4	November 14, 1993	Mission Viejo, California	Cayman Islands	8–1	8–1	Friendly
5	December 5, 1993	Los Angeles, California	El Salvador	2–0	7–0	Friendly
6	December 5, 1993	Los Angeles, California	El Salvador	3–0	7–0	Friendly
7	December 5, 1993	Los Angeles, California	El Salvador	6–0	7–0	Friendly
8	December 5, 1993	Los Angeles, California	El Salvador	7–0	7–0	Friendly
9	May 7, 1994	Fullerton, California	Estonia	4–0	4–0	Friendly
10	July 22, 1995	Maldonado, Uruguay	Colombia	1–4	1–4	1995 Copa America
11	October 8, 1995	Washington, D.C.	Saudi Arabia	2–3	4–3	Friendly
12	January 13, 1996	Anaheim, California	Trinidad and Tobago	3–1	3–2	1996 Gold Cup
13	August 30, 1996	Los Angeles, California	El Salvador	1–0	3–1	Friendly
14	August 30, 1996	Los Angeles, California	El Salvador	3–1	3–1	Friendly
15	November 24, 1996	Port of Spain, Trinidad and Tobago	Trinidad and Tobago	1–0	1–0	1998 World Cup qualifying
16	January 22, 1997	Pasadena, California	Denmark	1–2	1–4	1997 Nike U.S. Cup
17	February 1, 1998	Oakland, California	Cuba	3–0	3–0	1998 Gold Cup
18	March 11, 1999	Los Angeles, California	Guatemala	2–0	3–1	1999 Nike U.S. Cup
19	June 13, 1999	Washington, D.C.	Argentina	1–0	1–0	Friendly
20	July 30, 1999	Guadalajara, Mexico	Germany	2–0	2–0	1999 Confederations Cup
21	August 16, 2000	Foxborough, Massachusetts	Barbados	3–0	7–0	2002 World Cup qualifying
22	August 16, 2000	Foxborough, Massachusetts	Barbados	7–0	7–0	2002 World Cup qualifying
23	October 7, 2001	Foxborough, Massachusetts	Jamaica	1–0	2–1	2002 World Cup qualifying
24	October 7, 2001	Foxborough, Massachusetts	Jamaica	2–1	2–1	2002 World Cup qualifying

== Charitable activities ==
Moore was to appear in a charity match for Hollywood United FC against Los Angeles Galaxy on November 4, 2007. Proceeds were to go the American Red Cross and The Salvation Army to benefit those affected by the wildfires in Southern California.

== Honors ==
Individual

- MLS All-Star: 1999

== See also ==
- List of men's footballers with 100 or more international caps
