= John Kerr (soccer, born 1965) =

American soccer coach and player (born 1965)

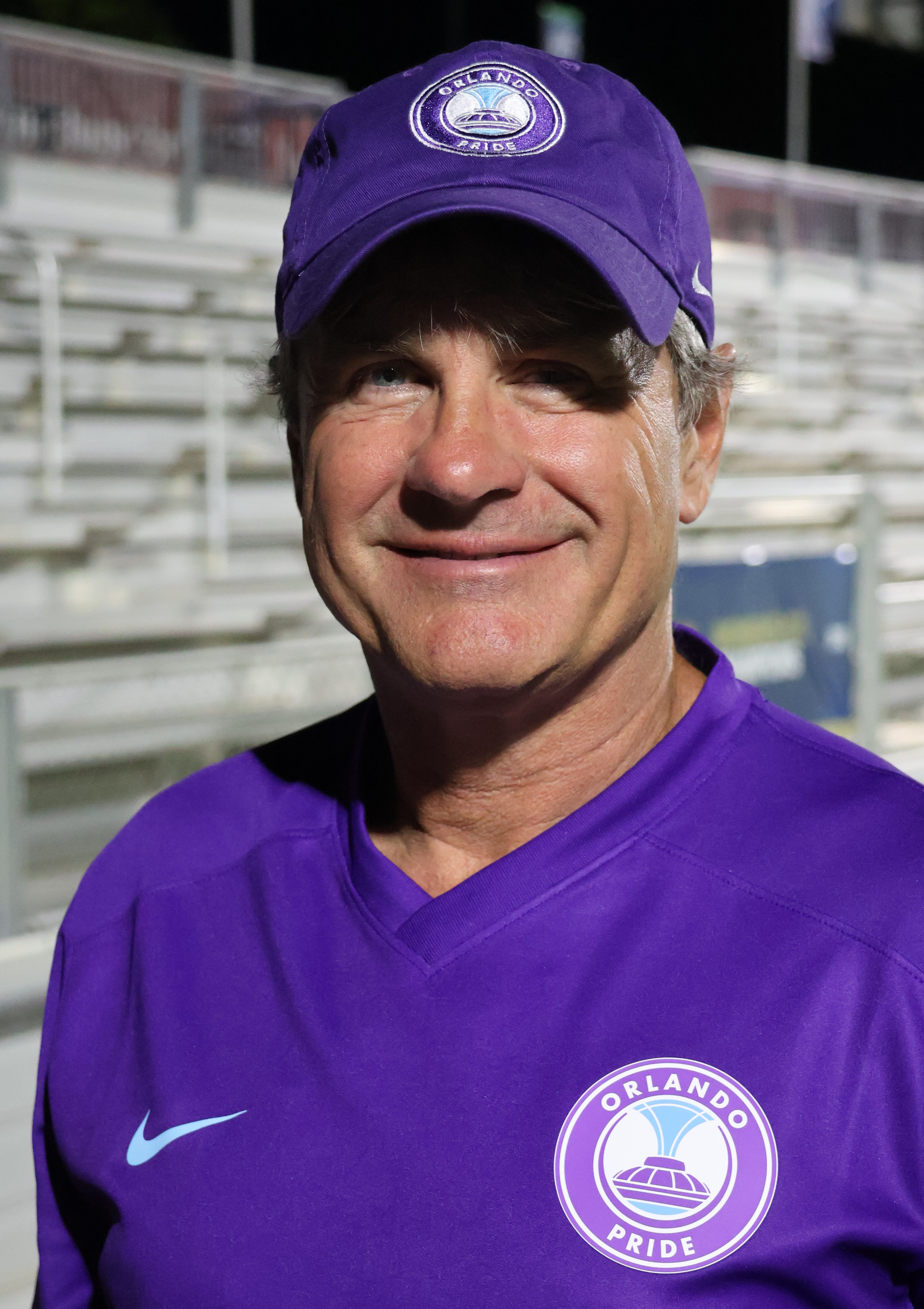
- Kerr in 2024

Personal information
- Full name: John Kerr Jr.
- Date of birth: March 6, 1965 (age 61)
- Place of birth: Toronto, Ontario, Canada
- Height: 5 ft 9 in (1.75 m)
- Position: Midfielder

Youth career
- 1983–1984: Montgomery United

College career
Years	Team	Apps	(Gls)
1984–1986	Duke Blue Devils		

Senior career*
Years	Team	Apps	(Gls)
1987	Harrow Borough	?	(?)
1987–1988	Portsmouth	4	(0)
1987–1988	→ Peterborough United (loan)	10	(1)
1988–1990	Washington Stars	?	(12)
1988–1989	Wycombe Wanderers	29	(13)
1990	Boulogne	?	(?)
1990	Linfield	?	(?)
1991	Hamilton Steelers	24	(9)
1991–1992	San Diego Sockers (indoor)	39	(12)
1992–1993	Chertsey Town	?	(?)
1993–1995	Millwall	43	(8)
1995–1996	→ Walsall (loan)	1	(0)
1996	Dallas Burn	12	(3)
1996–1997	New England Revolution	26	(4)
1997	→ Connecticut Wolves (loan)	1	(0)
1997–1998	Linfield	?	(1)
1998–1999	Boston Bulldogs	40	(5)
1999	→ New England Revolution (loan)	0	(0)

International career
1984–1995	United States	16	(2)

Managerial career
- 1992: Duke Blue Devils (assistant)
- 1993: Duke Blue Devils (assistant)
- 1998–1999: Boston Bulldogs
- 1999–2007: Harvard Crimson
- 2008–: Duke Blue Devils
- * Club domestic league appearances and goals

John Kerr Jr. (born March 6, 1965) is a soccer coach and former player who is the head coach of the Duke Blue Devils men's soccer team. He played professionally as a midfielder in the United States, Canada, England, France and Northern Ireland during a much traveled and varied playing career. Kerr was named the 1986 Hermann Award winner as the top collegiate player of the year. Born in Canada, he also earned sixteen caps, scoring two goals, with the United States national team.

== Player ==
=== Youth ===
Born in Canada, Kerr grew up in Falls Church, Virginia. The son of Scottish footballer John Kerr Sr., Kerr Jr. won the 1983 James P. McGuire Cup with Montgomery United and in 1986, while playing the collegiate off-season with his father's Fairfax Spartans, he won the National Amateur Cup. Kerr played collegiately at Duke University. During his four years with the Blue Devils he was a two time first-team All-America. In 1986, he was the captain of the Duke team that won the NCAA national championship. He won the Hermann Award as the NCAA Player of the Year as a senior. In 2004, Duke University inducted Kerr into its Sports Hall of Fame.

Kerr is one of 22 college players to be part of the 40-40 club, having both 40 goals and 40 assists in their college career.

=== Professional ===
In the spring of 1987, Kerr spent his last semester of college as an exchange student in England. While in England, he played with Isthmian League club Harrow Borough towards the end of 1986–1987 season reportedly attracting the attention of several English Football League professional clubs. In June 1987, the Tacoma Stars of the Major Indoor Soccer League selected Kerr in the second round of the MISL draft. He declined to sign with the Stars. In the summer of 1987, he returned to England and signed with Portsmouth (then newly promoted to the First Division) on the recommendation of Peter Osgood. Making his First Division debut for the club away at Oxford United in a 4–2 defeat on August 15, 1987. During the 1987–88 season, Kerr made a first team total of four league and two cup game appearances together with a 3-month loan spell at then Fourth Division club, Peterborough United. During one of those first team appearances for Portsmouth, Kerr was to make English Football League history when on September 19, 1987, while on the field of play as a replacement in a First Division away fixture at Watford, he became the first substitute to be likewise, substituted. The English Football League rule change that increased the number of player substitutions during a game from one to two per side having been introduced at the start of the previous 1986–87 season. Kerr made his final First Division appearance for Portsmouth as a substitute in a 4–1 away defeat to Luton Town on March 29, 1988. Following his release from Portsmouth, Kerr returned to the United States and signed with the Washington Stars of the American Soccer League (and coached at the time by his father, John Kerr Sr) in March 1988. He remained with the Stars for three seasons, the last in the American Professional Soccer League. While playing for the Stars during the summer, Kerr returned to Europe with English club Wycombe Wanderers, then playing in the GM Vauxhall Conference League, for the 1988–89 season. Making a total of 48 appearances and scoring 22 times in league and cup games for the Buckinghamshire club on its way to finishing in fourth position behind eventual Conference champions of that season, Maidstone United. Following his involvement with the U.S. squad as it prepared for the 1990 FIFA World Cup, Kerr had spells during 1990–91 with French Third Division side Boulogne-Sur-Mer and Northern Ireland club Linfield. In 1991, he returned to Canada to play one season with the Hamilton Steelers of the Canadian Soccer League. In October 1991, Kerr signed with the San Diego Sockers of the Major Soccer League. Kerr established himself as a regular on the team which went on to win the 1992 MSL championship. Following the collapse of the MSL during the summer of 1992, Kerr briefly spent time as an assistant coach with the Duke Blue Devils men's soccer team before returning to England, joining Isthmian League club Chertsey Town in the fall of 1992. He then moved to Football League club Millwall signing as a free agent on February 26, 1993 before temporary returning to the U.S. during the off-season summer break to continue his assistant coaching duties at Duke. Kerr went on to make a total of 40 first team appearances for Millwall in league and cup games during the 1993–94 and 1994–95 seasons, scoring 7 goals in the process. Towards the end of his time with Millwall, he also had a short on loan period with Walsall. In May 1995, Millwall gave Kerr a free transfer to the San Diego Sockers, however, he did not play for the Sockers. On February 8, 1996, the Dallas Burn selected Kerr in the ninth round (eighty-third overall) on the 1996 MLS Inaugural Player Draft. On June 27, 1996, Kerr was part of the first in-season trade in MLS history when the Burn dealt him to the New England Revolution for Zak Ibsen. He was later loaned out to the Connecticut Wolves. In 1998, Kerr was appointed player-coach with the Worcester Wildfire of the USL A-League, the following year the club was renamed the Boston Bulldogs after a change of ownership. In April 1999, Kerr returned on loan to the Revolution when several players on the team were ruled out because of injury. However, Kerr did not play during his loan period.

=== U.S. National Team ===
While at Duke, Kerr began his international career having become a naturalized U.S. citizen. He made his international debut in a scoreless draw versus Ecuador on 30 November 1984 in New York City. He soon became a regular player on the team and saw considerable playing time until 1988. From then until 1995, however, he failed to earn any more caps. As a result, he missed out on both the 1990 and 1994 World Cups. In 1995, he returned to the U.S. team and was included on the squad that surprisingly reached the semi-finals at the 1995 Copa América. He finished his national team career with 16 appearances and 2 goals.

== Coaching ==
Kerr began coaching while in England and continued intermittently over the years until he finally retired from playing professionally in 1997. In 1992 and 1993, he returned to Duke University serving briefly as an assistant coach under head coach John Rennie, who had coached Kerr during his college playing days as a Duke Blue Devil. In 1997, he was the junior varsity and assistant varsity coach with Wellesley High School in Wellesley, Massachusetts. The following year of 1998, he became player-coach of the Worcester Wildfire in the USL A-League returning again in 1999 as player-coach for the renamed Boston Bulldogs. On July 14, 1999, Harvard announced it had hired Kerr to coach its men's soccer team. However, Kerr did not move to that position until August 27, 1999, upon the completion of the A-League season. He coached the Harvard Crimson through to the 2007 fall season, finishing with an Ivy League Conference record of 81–57–13. On December 19, 2007, Kerr was named head coach of his alma mater, Duke University of the Atlantic Coast Conference following the retirement of John Rennie. He also coaches Triangle United Gold in Chapel Hill, North Carolina.

== Personal ==
Kerr is married to his wife Tracy and they have three children, twins Cameron and Alexandra and a younger son Drew.
