= Victor Mella =

Chilean footballer (born 1974)

Personal information
- Full name: Víctor Hugo Mella González
- Date of birth: November 14, 1974 (age 51)
- Place of birth: Santiago, Chile
- Height: 5 ft 9 in (1.75 m)
- Position: Forward

Youth career
- Cobresal
- Colo-Colo

Senior career*
Years	Team	Apps	(Gls)
1992–1995	Colo-Colo	1	(1)
1995	→ Fernández Vial (loan)	20	(1)
1996	San Jose Clash	5	(0)
1996	New England Revolution	3	(0)
1997	Colo-Colo	0	(0)
1997	→ Everton (loan)	24	(2)
1998	San Jose Clash	31	(4)
1999–2000	Santos Laguna	0	(0)
1999–2000	→ Real Zacatecas (loan)		
2000	Veracruz		
2002	Magallanes		
2003	Atlético Celaya		
- * Club domestic league appearances and goals

Víctor Hugo Mella González (born November 14, 1974), referred as Victor Mella, is a Chilean former footballer who played as a forward, spending two seasons in Major League Soccer, two in the Chilean leagues and three in Mexico.

== Career ==
Mella was born in Santiago, Chile. He began his career in both the Cobresal and the Colo-Colo youth program. In 1995, he played for Fernández Vial on loan from Colo-Colo.

In February 1996, the San Jose Clash selected Mella in the ninth round of the 1996 MLS Inaugural Player Draft. He played the team's first five games before being waived. On May 24, 1996, the New England Revolution claimed him off waivers. He played only three league games with the Revolution before being released. He returned to Chile where he spent the 1997 season playing for Colo-Colo and on loan for Everton de Viña del Mar. On January 15, 1998, he signed again with the Clash. This time, he played 31 games, scoring 4 goals.

He then moved to Mexico to play for Real Zacatecas and Veracruz. After suffering a serious injury, he returned to Chile to play for Magallanes. He finished his career with Atlético Celaya at the age of 28.

== Post-retirement ==
Following his retirement, he made his home in Veracruz, Mexico, and worked as a coach for football academies.
