= Dahir Mohammed =

American soccer player (1973–2024)

Personal information
- Date of birth: 17 March 1973
- Place of birth: Addis Ababa, Ethiopia
- Date of death: 20 November 2024 (aged 51)
- Height: 6 ft 2 in (1.88 m)
- Position: Defender

Youth career
- Mineola Portuguese SC

College career
Years	Team	Apps	(Gls)
1991–1994	C.W. Post Pioneers		

Senior career*
Years	Team	Apps	(Gls)
1996–1997	Long Island Rough Riders		(3)
1998	New England Revolution	7	(0)
1998	→ MLS Pro-40 (loan)	2	(0)
1998	→ Connecticut Wolves (loan)	1	(0)
1999	Staten Island Vipers	22	(2)
2000	Long Island Rough Riders	17	(2)
2000	→ MetroStars (loan)	3	(0)
2002	Connecticut Wolves	8	(0)
2004	Long Island Rough Riders	17	(0)

International career
- United States U23

Managerial career
- 2007: Brooklyn Knights
- * Club domestic league appearances and goals

Dahir Mohammed (17 March 1973 – 20 November 2024) was a professional soccer coach and player who played as a defender in Major League Soccer. Born in Ethiopia, he represented the United States at youth international level.

== Early life and career ==
Mohammed moved to the United States as a boy. He played for Mineola Portuguese SC.

He attended C.W. Post College where he played on the men's soccer team from 1991 to 1994. He was the New York Collegiate Athletic Conference Player of the Year in 1994.

== Club career ==
In 1996, he played one game for the Pennsylvania Natives in an exhibition game against the MetroStars.

In 1996, Mohammed signed with the Long Island Rough Riders of the USISL. In August 1997, he scored the winning goal as the Rough Riders defeated the New England Revolution in a 1997 U.S. Open Cup game.

On 1 February 1997, the Revolution selected Mohammed in the first round (fifth overall) of the 1998 MLS supplemental draft. He played for the Revolution until waived on 2 November 1998.

In April 1999, he joined the Staten Island Vipers.

He spent 2000 with the Rough Riders, but played three games on loan with the MetroStars.

In 2002, he played for the Connecticut Wolves.

In 2004, he was with the Rough Riders, now in the USL Second Division.

== International career ==
Mohammed played for the United States under-23 national team.

== Coaching career ==
In 2007, Mohammed coached the Brooklyn Knights of the USL Premier Development League.

== Personal life and death ==
Mohammed died on 20 November 2024, at the age of 51.
