= Edwin Gorter =

Dutch footballer (born 1963)

Personal information
- Full name: Wilhelmus Edwin Gorter
- Date of birth: 6 July 1963 (age 63)
- Place of birth: The Hague, Netherlands
- Height: 1.77 m (5 ft 10 in)
- Position: Midfielder

Youth career
- RVC

Senior career*
Years	Team	Apps	(Gls)
1980–1984	DS'79	81	(18)
1984–1986	Roda JC	65	(19)
1986–1991	Lugano	151	(72)
1991–1994	Caen	65	(6)
1994	Lommel	14	(0)
1994–1995	Utrecht	26	(11)
1995–1996	Vitesse	18	(5)
1996–1998	NAC	18	(0)
1998–1999	New England Revolution	34	(8)
1999	Miami Fusion	15	(3)
Total		486	(142)

International career
1984–1985	Netherlands U21	5	(0)
1984	Netherlands U23	3	(0)
- * Club domestic league appearances and goals

Wilhelmus Edwin Gorter (born 6 July 1963) is a Dutch retired footballer who played as a midfielder.

== Early and personal life ==
Born in The Hague, Gorter's mother died when he was 8 years old.

Gorter has two children, including son Donny who is also a professional footballer. His other child is a daughter, Sharon. Gorter has described himself as a "stern but fair" father.

== Playing career ==
=== Early career ===
Gorter played for RVC, DS'79, Roda JC, Lugano, Caen, Lommel, Utrecht, Vitesse Arnhem, NAC Breda, the New England Revolution and the Miami Fusion.

While playing in Switzerland for FC Lugano, Gorter won the Foreigner of the Year award for the 1990–91 season.

In 1994, while playing for FC Utrecht, Gorter attempted to gouge the eyes of opposition player Björn van der Doelen, receiving a seven-match ban as a result. He left the club at the end of that season.

=== Major League Soccer ===
As a free agent, Gorter moved to the United States in February 1998, signing for the New England Revolution of Major League Soccer on 23 February 1998.

Gorter received high praise upon his arrival. Revolution GM Brian O'Donovan heralded Gorter's signing as a "significant step towards building a championship-caliber team." With his style of play being compared to that of Carlos Valderrama, the Revolution hoped that signing a true playmaker like Gorter would help their "sputtering" offense take shape.

Gorter's arrival in New England was somewhat unorthodox in fledgling MLS, where, at the time, South American and African players were primarily targeted, partially due to the economic structure of the league, and partially to appeal towards the country's demographics.

In his first and only full season with the Revolution, Gorter managed to make 28 appearances, finishing tied for 2nd on the team in scoring with seven goals and recording seven assists. He made his first start in the first match of the 1998 New England Revolution season, a 2-1 shoot-out loss to D.C. United, and made his home debut on 10 May in a 4-3 win against the Tampa Bay Mutiny. In his home debut, Gorter also scored his first Revolution goal, assisted by Raúl Díaz Arce. Gorter was named the Midnight Riders "Man of the Year" for 1998.

On 6 October 1998, in an intrasquad training session at Babson College, Gorter used an "offensive racial epithet" directed at his teammate David Nakhid. Gorter admitted the offense to MLS commissioner Doug Logan and expressed remorse. He was subsequently suspended for the first two matches of the 1999 Major League Soccer season and fined $20,000, which was at the time the highest fine ever meted out by MLS.

In the 1999 New England Revolution season, Gorter started only four matches, scoring one goal, before he was traded to the Miami Fusion for defender Mario Gori on 22 June 1999.

Gorter played only one season with the Miami Fusion, making 15 total appearances, scoring three goals and recording one assist en route to helping to the team qualify for the 1999 MLS Cup Playoffs. At the end of the 1999 Major League Soccer season season, Gorter announced his retirement.

=== International ===
Gorter played 5 games for the Netherlands national under-21 football team and 3 for the Olympic team.

== Later career ==
After he retired from playing football, Gorter became a player's agent. He later worked as a television analyst for Eredivisie Live, and as a regional distributor for Cambridge België health products.

== Honours ==
Individual

- Foreigner of the Year: 1991
- Midnight Riders Man of the Year Award: 1998
