= Carlos Rocha =

Portuguese footballer

Personal information
- Date of birth: 4 December 1974 (age 51)
- Place of birth: Portugal
- Position: Forward

College career
Years	Team	Apps	(Gls)
1994–1996	Southern Connecticut Fighting Owls		

Senior career*
Years	Team	Apps	(Gls)
1996-1997	Rhode Island Stingrays		(24)
1998	New England Revolution	16	(0)
1998	Boston Bulldogs	6	(4)
1999	New England Revolution	1	(0)
1999	Boston Bulldogs	17	(10)
1999	Bury F.C.	3	(0)
2000–2001	Kilkenny City	10	(1)
2002	Connecticut Wolves	7	(4)
- * Club domestic league appearances and goals

Carlos Rocha (born 4 December 1974 in Portugal) is a Portuguese retired footballer.

== Career ==
Rocha played college soccer for the Southern Connecticut Fighting Owls between 1994 and 1996, where he is in the top 20 all-time assists list.

Rocha signed for Rhode Island Stingrays in the American third division, scoring 24 league goals before joining American top flight side New England Revolution, where he failed to score in 17 league appearances.

From another American third division team, Boston Bulldogs, where he scored 10 goals in 17 league appearances, Rocha signed for Bury in the English third division. Following Bury, he signed for Irish outfit Kilkenny City.
