= Carlos Parra (soccer, born 1977) =

American soccer player (born 1977)

Personal information
- Full name: Juan Carlos Parra
- Date of birth: February 3, 1977 (age 49)
- Place of birth: West Haven, Connecticut, U.S.
- Height: 6 ft 1 in (1.85 m)
- Position: Defender

Youth career
- Oakwood SC
- SC Baltimore Stars

Senior career*
Years	Team	Apps	(Gls)
1997–1998	NY/NJ MetroStars	6	(0)
1998	→ MLS Pro-40 (loan)	12	(1)
1998–1999	Miami Fusion	25	(0)
1999–2000	New England Revolution	26	(1)
2000	→ MLS Pro-40 (loan)	3	(0)
2000	→ Connecticut Wolves (loan)	2	(0)
2001	Rochester Raging Rhinos	2	(0)
2001–2003	Atlanta Silverbacks	63	(9)
2003	Minnesota Thunder	2	(0)
Total		141	(11)

International career
1997	United States U20	14	(1)
1998–2000	United States U23	9	(0)
- * Club domestic league appearances and goals

Carlos Parra (born February 3, 1977) is an American former professional soccer player who played as a defender.

He was the first MLS Project 40 player and played in Major League Soccer and the USL First Division.

== Early life and career ==
Parra played for the Oakwood SC in Glastonbury, CT. In 1997, Parra graduated from Hamden Hall Country Day School where he was a two-time Parade Magazine All American player.

== Club Career ==
On March 1, 1997, Parra became the first player to sign with MLS Project 40. The league assigned him to the New York/New Jersey MetroStars. He began the 1998 season on loan to MLS Pro-40 in the USISL A-League. On June 5, 1998, the MetroStars traded Parra to the Miami Fusion for Ramiro Corrales.

On June 4, 1999, the Fusion sent Parra to the New England Revolution for Tony Kuhn and a second-round pick in the 2000 MLS SuperDraft. The Revolution sent him on loan to MLS Pro-40 and the Connecticut Wolves during the 2000 season. On March 20, 2001, the Revolution traded Parra and Imad Baba to the Colorado Rapids for Matt Okoh and the Rapids second round draft pick in the 2002 MLS SuperDraft. On March 26, the Rapids waived Parra.

Parra then signed with the Rochester Raging Rhinos of the USL A-League. On June 11, 2001, Parra moved to the Atlanta Silverbacks as part of a three-team trade. As part of the trade deal, the Silverbacks sent Steve Armas to the Minnesota Thunder and the Thunder sent Stoian Mladenov to the Rhinos.

On February 10, 2003, Parra signed with the Minnesota Thunder. He played two games, then retired.

== International career ==
In 1997, Parra played two games for the United States national under-20 team at the 1997 FIFA World Youth Championship.

From 1998 to 2000, he also played nine times for the under-23 team.
