= Manny Motajo =

Nigerian footballer (born 1970)

Personal information
- Date of birth: February 13, 1970 (age 56)
- Place of birth: Greenbelt, Maryland, United States
- Height: 6 ft 0 in (1.83 m)
- Position: Defender

Youth career
- 1987–1988: First Bank
- 1989–1992: Howard University

Senior career*
| Years | Team | Apps | (Gls) |
| 1994 | Washington Mustangs | | |
| 1994–1995 | Washington Warthogs (indoor) | 41 | (6) |
| 1996 | Los Angeles Galaxy | 20 | (1) |
| 1997 | Jacksonville Cyclones | 26 | (0) |
| 1998–1999 | New England Revolution | 17 | (2) |

International career
| 1988–1989 | Nigeria U21 | | |
- * Club domestic league appearances and goals

Manny Motajo (born February 13, 1970) is a Nigerian retired footballer who played as a defender professionally in the USISL, Continental Indoor Soccer League and Major League Soccer.

In 1987, Motajo began his career with First Bank F.C. in the Nigeria National League. In 1989, he entered Howard University in the United States. He played soccer at Howard from 1989 to 1992. In 1994, he played for the Washington Mustangs in the USISL. He then moved to the Washington Warthogs in the Continental Indoor Soccer League for the 1994 and 1995 indoor seasons. Motajo caught the eye of scouts from Major League Soccer during the league’s initial open tryouts. This led to his selection in February 1996, by the Los Angeles Galaxy in the 9th round (84th overall) in the 1996 MLS Inaugural Player Draft. He played twenty games for the Galaxy in 1996, but was waived on November 8. In 1997, he played for the Jacksonville Cyclones of the USISL A-League. The New England Revolution signed Motajo on May 22, 1998. He played seventeen games for the Revolution over two seasons before being waived on June 15, 1999 to clear a roster spot for the recently signed Chaka Daley. He also played for the Nigerian national under-21 team between 1988 and 1989.
