= Jair (Cape Verdean footballer) =

Cape Verdean footballer (born 1974)

Personal information
- Full name: Anselmo Emiliano Carvalho Gomes Ribeiro
- Date of birth: December 17, 1974 (age 51)
- Place of birth: Cape Verde
- Height: 5 ft 8 in (1.73 m)
- Positions: Midfielder; forward

Youth career
- Connecticut Huskies

Senior career*
Years	Team	Apps	(Gls)
1993–1996	Sporting CP	0	(0)
1993–1994	→ Alverca (loan)		
1994–1996	→ Olhanense (loan)		
1996–1997	CSKA Sofia	6	(3)
1998–1999	New England Revolution	29	(4)
1999	San Jose Clash	3	(1)
2000	Hampton Roads Mariners	13	(3)
2001	Olhanense	5	(0)
2001	Tampa Bay Mutiny	25	(1)
2002	Connecticut Wolves	8	(2)
2003	Western Mass Pioneers		

International career
2000–2001	Cape Verde	10	(1)
- * Club domestic league appearances and goals

Anselmo Emiliano Carvalho Gomes Ribeiro (born December 17, 1974), known as Jair, is a Cape Verdean former professional footballer who played as a midfielder and forward.

== Early life ==
Jair emigrated from his native Cape Verde to the United States as a child, settling with his family in suburban Boston. He attended Madison Park High School in Roxbury, Massachusetts

== Club career ==
Jair began his professional career in Portugal, with the reserves of Sporting CP, although he never played a first team game with the team, and spent a great deal of time on loan at Portuguese second division clubs Alverca and Olhanense.

After two years with CSKA Sofia in Bulgaria, Jair signed with New England Revolution in March 1998, and became a starter in the team's midfield. He transferred to San Jose Clash in the middle of the 1999 season in exchange for Jeff Baicher, having played 29 games and scored 4 goals for Revolution, a move which sparked concerns about possible conflicts of interest within the league.

After a year with the Hampton Roads Mariners in the A-League, and a short three-month stay at one of his old clubs in Portugal, Olhanense, Jair moved to Florida to play for Tampa Bay Mutiny in 2001, ultimately playing 25 games for the team prior to its demise at the end of the season.

Jair spent two more years playing competitively, with Connecticut Wolves in the A-League in 2002, and with Western Mass Pioneers in the USL Pro Soccer League in 2003, before retiring from the sport in 2004.

== International career ==
Jair has played with the Cape Verde national football team, appearing in World Cup qualifiers in 2000 against Algeria.

== Personal life ==
Jair's nickname was inspired by the legendary Brazilian player Jair da Rosa Pinto, who is best remembered for his performance in Brazil's 1950 FIFA World Cup campaign.

Jair currently resides in Florida.
