= Tony Kuhn =

American soccer player

Personal information
- Date of birth: December 15, 1975 (age 50)
- Place of birth: Memphis, Tennessee, United States
- Height: 6 ft 1 in (1.85 m)
- Position: Forward

Youth career
- 1994–1997: Vanderbilt University

Senior career*
Years	Team	Apps	(Gls)
1998	Nashville Metros		
1998	→ Milwaukee Rampage (loan)	2	(1)
1998	Chicago Fire	5	(0)
1998	→ MLS Pro 40 (loan)	10	(3)
1999	New England Revolution	6	(0)
1999	→ MLS Pro 40 (loan)	2	(1)
1999	Miami Fusion	10	(0)
2002	Memphis Express		
2002	Atlanta Silverbacks	9	(1)
- * Club domestic league appearances and goals

Tony Kuhn (born December 15, 1975) is a former U.S. soccer forward who spent two seasons in Major League Soccer and several in the USL First Division, USISL and Premier Development League.

Kuhn attended Vanderbilt University, where he played on the men's soccer team from 1994 to 1997. He holds the school's records for goalscoring in a single season with 23, for career goals with 58, and for career assists with 27. He was a 1996 First Team and a 1997 Second Team All American. He graduated in the spring of 1998. That year, the Nashville Metros selected Kuhn in the first round of the USL Draft. He also played for the Milwaukee Rampage on loan from the Metros. In 1998, Kuhn signed with the Chicago Fire of Major League Soccer. He played five games with the Fire in 1998, but was placed on waivers on April 2, 1999. Four days later, the New England Revolution claimed Kuhn off waivers. He played six games for the Revs before being traded to the Miami Fusion in exchange for Carlos Parra on June 4, 1999. The Fusion waived Kuhn on November 25, 1999. In 2002, Kuhn began the season with the Memphis Express in the Premier Development League before finishing it with the Atlanta Silverbacks in the USL A-League.
