= Richard Goulooze =

Dutch footballer

Personal information
- Date of birth: 16 November 1967 (age 58)
- Place of birth: Alkmaar, Netherlands
- Height: 6 ft 0 in (1.83 m)
- Position: Right back

Youth career
- FC Huiswaard
- Alkmaarsche Boys

Senior career*
Years	Team	Apps	(Gls)
1986–1989	AZ	73	(3)
1989–1992	Heerenveen	107	(7)
1992–1994	Derby County	12	(0)
1994–1998	Cambuur	97	(3)
1998–1999	New England Revolution	40	(1)
1999–2002	NEC	21	(0)
2002–2003	Lisse		
Total		350	(14)
- * Club domestic league appearances and goals

Richard Goulooze (born 16 November 1967) is a Dutch retired footballer who played as a right back. Active in the Netherlands, England, and the United States, he made over 350 career league appearances.

== Career ==
Born in Alkmaar, Goulooze played for FC Huiswaard, Alkmaarsche Boys, AZ, Heerenveen, Derby County, Cambuur, New England Revolution, NEC and Lisse. He was the first ever Dutch player at Derby County.

After retiring, Goulooze became a businessman, and continued to play master's football.
