= Boston Bulldogs (soccer) =

- Full name: Boston Bulldogs Pro Soccer
- Nickname: Bulldogs
- Founded: 1996 (as Worcester Wildfire)
- Dissolved: 2001
- Stadium: Bowditch Field; Framingham, Massachusetts
- Capacity: 5,000
- Owner(s): John Curtis (1996); Tom Bagley; Reidar Tryggestad
- League: USISL (1996); USL A-League (1997-2000); USL D3 Pro League (2001)

The Boston Bulldogs were a soccer club founded in 1996 as the Worcester Wildfire. The debuted in the USISL and would play in the A-League from 1997 to 2000. Before folding, the team played its final season in the USL D3 Pro Soccer League in 2001. The club played its games at Bowditch Field in Framingham, Massachusetts.

== History ==
The first year in the A-League was fraught with financial problems and lack of a regular training facility. The owner was John Curtis from Cape Cod who also owned the Cape Cod Crusaders and the new women's franchise the Boston Renegades. Curtis was forced to sell the club before the start of the second season. The first coach of the A-League Wildfire was Nigel Boulton, a native of Wales. Boulton resigned following the completion of the first year to take up the State Director of Coaching position in Mississippi. He now coaches the men's program at William Carey University in Hattiesburg, Mississippi. The Wildfire were the official 'farm team' for the New England Revolution of Major League Soccer. Notable former players on the Wildfire/Bulldogs roster include Jon Busch (1997) (who played for the US National Team in 2005) and Steve Nicol, (a legend with Liverpool FC in England, and the Scotland National team) both of whom have also found success in Major League Soccer.

Worcester Wildfire logo used from 1996 to 1998

== Year-by-year ==
| Year | Division | League | Reg. season | Playoffs | Open Cup |
|---|---|---|---|---|---|
| 1996 | 2 | USISL Pro League | 9th Northeast | Did not qualify | Did not qualify |
| 1996/97 | N/A | USISL I-League | Played limited schedule | Did not qualify | N/A |
| 1997 | 2 | USISL A-League | 6th, Northeast | Did not qualify | Did not qualify |
| 1998 | 2 | USISL A-League | 5th, Northeast | Did not qualify | Third Round |
| 1999 | 2 | USL A-League | 6th, Northeast | Did not qualify | Did not qualify |
| 2000 | 2 | USL A-League | 5th, Northeast | Did not qualify | Did not qualify |
| 2001 | 3 | USL D3-Pro League | 1st, Northern | Semifinals | Semifinals |

== Coaches ==
- (Wales) Nigel Boulton: 1997
- (United States) John Kerr: 1998-99
- (Scotland) Steve Nicol: 1999, 2000–01

== See also ==
- New England Revolution
- Cape Cod Crusaders
