= 1998 Chicago Fire season =

Chicago Fire
1998 season
- Head coach: Bob Bradley
- Major League Soccer: West: 2nd Overall: 3rd
- MLS Cup Playoffs: Winners
- U.S. Open Cup: Winners
- Brimstone Cup: Winners
Home colors

The 1998 Chicago Fire season was the Chicago Fire Soccer Club's inaugural season of existence, and their first season in Major League Soccer, the top tier of American soccer.

The Chicago Fire enjoyed one of the strongest debuts for an expansion club in the history of American soccer and of the North American sports leagues in general. The Fire won the double by winning both MLS Cup '98 and the 1998 U.S. Open Cup Final, both in a five-day timespan. It was the first time in any of the major American sports leagues that an expansion franchise in its first year won the league championship. The next time a first-year expansion franchise would reach the championship of their respective sports league would be 20 years later, when the NHL's Vegas Golden Knights ice hockey team reached the 2018 Stanley Cup Final.

== Background ==
The last professional soccer club to play in the Chicago area was the Chicago Sting, who played in the original NASL from 1974 to 1983, and then in the Major Indoor Soccer League from 1984 to 1988. The Sting won two Soccer Bowl championships: in 1981 and again in 1984.

The Chicago Fire were one of two new MLS expansion teams to join MLS in 1998, and the first two ever expansion teams in league history, the other team being the now-defunct Miami Fusion. The Fire were founded on October 8, 1997, on the 126th anniversary of the Great Chicago Fire. The club was named after the event. The club focused on recruiting players of various descent to reflect on the diversity of the region. The team brought in Polish players Piotr Nowak, Jerzy Podbrożny, and Roman Kosecki; the Mexican Jorge Campos; and the Czech Luboš Kubík.

== Club ==
=== Roster ===
No.	Name	Nationality	Position	Date of birth (age)	Previous club
Goalkeepers
	Jorge Campos	(Mexico)	GK	October 15, 1966 (aged 32)	(Mexico) Cruz Azul
	Scott Coufal	(United States)	GK	September 27, 1974 (aged 24)	
	Kevin Rueda	(United States)	GK	March 16, 1969 (aged 29)	
	Zach Thornton	(United States)	GK	October 10, 1973 (aged 25)	
	David Winner	(United States)	GK	April 23, 1971 (aged 27)	
Defenders
	Diego Gutiérrez	(United States)	DF	November 3, 1972 (aged 25)	
	Ritchie Kotschau	(United States)	DF	November 22, 1975 (aged 22)	
	Luboš Kubík	(Czechoslovakia)	CB	January 20, 1964 (aged 34)	
	Francis Okaroh	(Nigeria)	CB	August 25, 1963 (aged 35)	
	Mike Richardson	(United States)	DF	October 8, 1968 (aged 30)	
	Tom Soehn	(United States)	DF	April 15, 1966 (aged 32)	
	Brian Bates	(United States)	DF	August 16, 1972 (aged 26)	(United States) Colorado Rapids
	C. J. Brown	(United States)	CB	June 15, 1975 (aged 23)	(United States) San Francisco Bay Seals
	Andrew Lewis	(United States)	DF	July 10, 1974 (aged 24)	
	Joe Carver	(United States)	DF	June 11, 1971 (aged 27)	
Midfielders
	Chris Armas	(United States)	MF	August 22, 1972 (aged 26)	(United States) LA Galaxy
	Zak Ibsen	(United States)	MF	June 2, 1972 (aged 26)	
	Josh Keller	(United States)	MF	February 16, 1975 (aged 23)	
	Manny Lagos	(United States)	MF	June 11, 1971 (aged 27)	
	Jesse Marsch	(United States)	MF	November 8, 1973 (aged 24)	
	Peter Nowak	(Poland)	MF	July 5, 1964 (aged 34)	
	Jorge Salcedo	(United States)	MF	September 27, 1972 (aged 26)	
Forwards
	Frank Klopas	(United States)	FW	September 1, 1966 (aged 32)	
	Roman Kosecki	(Poland)	FW	February 15, 1966 (aged 32)	
	Tony Kuhn	(United States)	FW	December 15, 1975 (aged 22)	
	Jerzy Podbrożny	(Poland)	FW	December 17, 1966 (aged 31)	
	Ante Razov	(United States)	FW	March 2, 1974 (aged 24)	
	Josh Wolff	(United States)	FW	February 25, 1977 (aged 21)	

Player's age during the 1998 season.

=== Team management ===
Position	Staff
General Manager	Peter Wilt
Head Coach	Bob Bradley
Assistant Coach	
Assistant Coach	
Goalkeeper Coach	

== Competitive ==
=== Major League Soccer ===
==== Standings ====
===== Western Conference =====
Pos	Team	Pld	W	SOW	L	GF	GA	GD	Pts	Qualification
1	Los Angeles Galaxy	32	22	2	8	85	44	+41	68	MLS Cup Playoffs
2	Chicago Fire	32	18	2	12	62	45	+17	56	MLS Cup Playoffs
3	Colorado Rapids	32	14	2	16	62	69	−7	44	MLS Cup Playoffs
4	Dallas Burn	32	11	4	17	43	59	−16	37	MLS Cup Playoffs
5	San Jose Clash	32	10	3	19	48	60	−12	33	
6	Kansas City Wizards	32	10	2	20	45	50	−5	32	

Source: MLS

===== Overall table =====
Pos	Team	Pld	W	SOW	L	GF	GA	GD	Pts	Qualification
1	Los Angeles Galaxy (S)	32	22	2	8	85	44	+41	68	CONCACAF Champions' Cup
2	D.C. United	32	17	7	8	74	48	+26	58	CONCACAF Champions' Cup
3	Chicago Fire (C)	32	18	2	12	62	45	+17	56	CONCACAF Champions' Cup
4	Columbus Crew	32	15	0	17	67	56	+11	45	
5	Colorado Rapids	32	14	2	16	62	69	−7	44	

Source: MLS
Rules for classification: 1) points; 2) head-to-head record; 3) goal difference; 4) number of goals scored
(C) Champions; (S) Supporters' Shield

==== Results by round ====
Matchday	1	2	3	4	5	6	7	8	9	10	11	12	13	14	15	16	17	18	19	20	21	22	23	24	25	26	27	28	29	30	31	32
Stadium	A	H	A	A	H	A	H	A	H	H	A	H	H	A	H	H	H	A	A	A	A	A	H	H	A	A	H	A	H	H	H	A
Result	W	W	L	L	L	L	L	W	W	W	SO	W	W	W	W	W	W	W	L	L	L	L	L	W	W	W	W	L	W	W	W	L

Source: Chicago-Fire.com
A = Away; H = Home; W = Win; L = Loss; SO = Shootout Win

==== Match reports ====
March 21, 1998 1	Miami Fusion	0–2	Chicago Fire	Fort Lauderdale, Florida
	Vaudreuil (yellow card) 26'; Gutierrez (yellow card) 31'; Serna (yellow card) 49'; Kooiman (yellow card) 65'; Kmosko (yellow card) 90'	Report	Okaroh (yellow card) 57'; Kosecki 76'; Kotschau 87'	Stadium: Lockhart Stadium; Attendance: 14,653; Referee: Arturo Angeles

April 4, 1998 2	Chicago Fire	2–0	Tampa Bay Mutiny	Chicago
	Brown (yellow card) 22'; Klopas 43', 88'; Armas (yellow card) 81'; Kubík (yellow card) 87'	Report	Houser (yellow card) 4' (yellow-red card) 29'; Ralston (yellow card) 6'; Kinnear (yellow card) 49'; Lassiter (yellow card) 59'	Stadium: Soldier Field; Attendance: 36,444; Referee: Esse Baharmast

April 8, 1998 3	Kansas City Wizards	1–0	Chicago Fire	Kansas City, Missouri
	Okafor (yellow card) 33'; Šabanadžović (yellow card) 66'; Marino 76'	Report		Stadium: Arrowhead Stadium; Attendance: 4,130; Referee: Kevin Terry

April 11, 1998 4	San Jose Clash	1–0	Chicago Fire	San Jose, California
	Mella (yellow card) 26'; Cerritos 37'; Rodriguez (yellow card) 86'	Report	Isben (yellow card) 32'	Stadium: Spartan Stadium; Attendance: 9,937; Referee: Marcel Yonan

April 17, 1998 5	Chicago Fire	0–1	MetroStars	Chicago, Illinois
	Klopas (yellow card) 73'	Report	Zavagnin (yellow card) 5'; Lalas 14'; Semioli (yellow card) 34'; Sorber (yellow card) 48' (yellow-red card) 90'; Rooney (yellow card) 58'; Hurtado (yellow card) 90'	Stadium: Soldier Field; Attendance: 24,661; Referee: Juan Carlos Paniagua

April 25, 1998 6	Colorado Rapids	4–4 (3–1 SO)	Chicago Fire	Denver, Colorado
	Paule 26'; Sáenz 35', 48'; Martinez (yellow card) 72'; Bravo 80'	Report	Kosecki 10'; Klopas 39', 43'; Marsch 87'	Stadium: Mile High Stadium; Attendance: 10,736; Referee: Refugio Ramirez
	Shootout
	Henderson (penalty scored); Martinez (penalty scored); Harris (penalty missed); Bravo (penalty scored)		(penalty missed) Kosecki; (penalty scored) Razov; (penalty missed) Kubík; (penalty missed) Marsch

May 2, 1998 7	Chicago Fire	1–3	D.C. United	Chicago, Illinois
	Klopas 9'; Kosecki (red card) 65'	Report	Sanneh (yellow card) 13'; Etcheverry (yellow card) 14', (goal) 86'; Lassiter 19'; Llamosa (yellow card) 25'; Talley (yellow card) 85'; Olsen 88'	Stadium: Soldier Field; Attendance: 27,136; Referee: Reggie Rutty

May 16, 1998 8	Tampa Bay Mutiny	1–2	Chicago Fire	Tampa, Florida
	Gilmar 30'	Report	Podbrożny 21'; Klopas (yellow card) 35'; Nowak 79'	Stadium: Houlihan's Stadium; Attendance: 6,391; Referee: Arturo Angeles

May 20, 1998 9	Chicago Fire	3–1	Los Angeles Galaxy	Chicago, Illinois
	Nowak 37', 68'; Podbrożny (yellow card) 57'; Kosecki 58'	Report	Vásquez (yellow card) 66'; Wélton 75'; Sánchez (yellow card) 87'	Stadium: Soldier Field; Attendance: 10,520; Referee: Alex Prus
Note: Match originally scheduled for May 9, 1998

May 23, 1998 10	Chicago Fire	5–0	Colorado Rapids	Chicago, Illinois
	Brown 21'; Razov 51'; Podbrożny 55', (yellow card) 63'; Kosecki 57'; Okaroh (yellow card) 61'; Wolff 86'	Report	Paz (yellow card) 16'; Henderson (yellow card) 19' (yellow-red card) 72'; Trittschuh (yellow card) 85'	Stadium: Soldier Field; Attendance: 23,789; Referee: Marcel Yonan
Note: Match originally scheduled for May 24, 1998

May 30, 1998 11	Los Angeles Galaxy	1–1 (1–3 SO)	Chicago Fire	Pasadena, California
	Cienfuegos 3'; Jolley (yellow card) 23'; Fraser (yellow card) 38'; Mathis (yellow card) 58'	Report	Kubík (yellow card) 31'; Razov 49', (yellow card) 61'; Okaroh (yellow card) 55'	Stadium: Rose Bowl; Attendance: 28,241; Referee: Rich Grady
	Shootout
	Mathis (penalty missed); Karapetyan (penalty missed); Vanney (penalty scored); Cienfuegos (penalty missed)		(penalty scored) Razov; (penalty missed) Marsch; (penalty missed) Kubík; (penalty scored) Isben; (penalty scored) Nowak

June 6, 1998 12	Chicago Fire	2–0	Columbus Crew	Chicago, Illinois
	Razov (yellow card) 3'; Kotschau 8'; Brown (yellow card) 48'; Nowak 52'	Report	Elcock (yellow card) 81'	Stadium: Soldier Field; Attendance: 19,801; Referee: Noel Kenny

June 11, 1998 13	Chicago Fire	5–2	San Jose Clash	Chicago, Illinois
	Razov 4'; Nowak 33', 49'; Kotschau 52'; Wolff 74'	Report	Lozzano (yellow card) 8'; Uribe 76'; Cerritos 80'	Stadium: Soldier Field; Attendance: 7,598; Referee: Kevin Stott

June 14, 1998 14	New England Revolution	1–3	Chicago Fire	Foxborough, Massachusetts
	Baba (yellow card) 24'; Díaz Arce 39' (pen.); Mohammed (yellow card) 54'; McKinley (yellow card) 58'	Report	Podbrożny 25', 85'; Kotschau (yellow card) 51', (goal) 60'	Stadium: Foxboro Stadium; Attendance: 17,054; Referee: Tim Weyland

June 17, 1998 15	Chicago Fire	1–0	Dallas Burn	Chicago, Illinois
	Kubík 64' (pen.); Armas (yellow card) 85'	Report	Álvarez (yellow card) 33'; Soehn (yellow card) 55'; Eck (yellow card) 88'; Santel (yellow card) 90'	Stadium: Soldier Field; Attendance: 9,638; Referee: Michael Kennedy
Note: Match originally scheduled for May 13, 1998

June 24, 1998 16	Chicago Fire	4–1	Kansas City Wizards	Chicago, Illinois
	Okaroh (yellow card) 12'; Razov 26'; Brown 36'; Kosecki 56', 76'	Report	Johnston 15'	Stadium: Soldier Field; Attendance: 13,396; Referee: Arturo Angeles

July 1, 1998 17	Chicago Fire	4–1	Dallas Burn	Chicago, Illinois
	Kubík 7', (yellow card) 49'; Razov 16'; Kosecki 20'; Podbrożny 36'	Report	Haynes 14'; Trotman (yellow card) 35'; Pollard (yellow card) 66'	Stadium: Soldier Field; Attendance: 13,615; Referee: Kevin Terry

July 4, 1998 18	Dallas Burn	0–1	Chicago Fire	Dallas
	Flores (yellow card) 41'; Rodríguez (yellow card) 68'; Elliott (yellow card) 83'	Report	Kubík 37'; Kosecki (yellow card) 44'; Brown (yellow card) 75'	Stadium: Cotton Bowl; Attendance: 12,372; Referee: Tim Weyland

July 9, 1998 19	Columbus Crew	3–0	Chicago Fire	Columbus, Ohio
	John 8'; Dooley (yellow card) 34'; Smith 40'; McBride 68'	Report		Stadium: Ohio Stadium; Attendance: 10,091; Referee: Paul Tamberino

July 18, 1998 20	D.C. United	4–1	Chicago Fire	Washington, D.C.
	Lassiter 53' (pen.), 69', 90'; Williams (yellow card) 56'; Moreno 78'	Report	Marsch 38', (yellow card) 49'	Stadium: RFK Stadium; Attendance: 16,779; Referee: Esse Baharmast

July 25, 1998 21	MetroStars	3–2	Chicago Fire	East Rutherford, New Jersey
	Hurtado 6'; Sorber (yellow card) 19'; Joseph 25'; Duhaney (yellow card) 38'; Kelly 45'; Vega (yellow card) 54'; Lalas (yellow card) 70'; Rooney (red card) 89'	Report	Kubík 20'; Armas (yellow card) 55'; Okaroh (yellow card) 83'; Kosecki 86'	Stadium: Giants Stadium; Attendance: 15,130; Referee: Brian Hall

July 29, 1998 22	San Jose Clash	3–0	Chicago Fire	San Jose, California
	Cloutier 32'; Medved (yellow card) 50'; Doyle (yellow card) 61'; Baicher 70', (yellow card) 74'; Wynalda 77'	Report	Soehn (yellow card) 7'; Kosecki (yellow card) 60'; Gutiérrez (red card) 68'; Podbrożny (yellow card) 76'	Stadium: Spartan Stadium; Attendance: 12,299; Referee: Ricardo Valenzuela

August 8, 1998 23	Chicago Fire	1–2	Los Angeles Galaxy	Chicago, Illinois
	Kosecki (yellow card) 25'; Soehn (yellow card) 31'; Pena 87' (o.g.)	Report	Cienfuegos (yellow card) 23'; Okaroh 37' (o.g.); Machón (yellow card) 41'; Jolley 90'	Stadium: Soldier Field; Attendance: 37,122; Referee: Paul Tamberino

August 15, 1998 24	Chicago Fire	2–1	San Jose Clash	Chicago, Illinois
	Kosecki 15'; Kubík (yellow card) 61'; Campos (yellow card) 64'; Wolff 80'	Report	Cerritos 7'; Mella (yellow card) 32'; Vásquez (yellow card) 87'	Stadium: Soldier Field; Attendance: 16,610; Referee: Ted Covaciu

August 21, 1998 25	Colorado Rapids	0–2	Chicago Fire	Denver, Colorado
	Vermes (yellow card) 64'; Paz (yellow card) 75'	Report	Kubík 64' (pen.); Armas 67'	Stadium: Mile High Stadium; Attendance: 24,450; Referee: Tim Weyland

August 29, 1998 26	Kansas City Wizards	2–2 (2–3 SO)	Chicago Fire	Kansas City, Missouri
	Chung 3'; Johnston 14', (red card) 64'	Report	Gutiérrez (yellow card) 22'; Marsch (yellow card) 26'; Razov 53'; Brown (red card) 64'; Podbrożny 90'	Stadium: Arrowhead Stadium; Attendance: 8,621; Referee: Sandra Hunt
	Shootout
	Chung (penalty missed); Takawira (penalty scored); DeBrito (penalty missed); Okafor (penalty missed); Tinsley (penalty scored); Johnson (penalty missed); Vermillion (penalty missed); Rideout (penalty missed); Bowers (penalty missed); Snitko (penalty missed); Chung (penalty missed); Takawira (penalty missed)		(penalty missed) Kubík; (penalty missed) Razov; (penalty scored) Wolff; (penalty scored) Podbrożny; (penalty missed) Isben; (penalty missed) Armas; (penalty missed) Gutiérrez; (penalty missed) Kosecki; (penalty missed) Okaroh; (penalty missed) Thornton; (penalty missed) Kubík; (penalty scored) Razov

September 2, 1998 27	Chicago Fire	3–2	Miami Fusion	Chicago, Illinois
	Razov 19', 38'; Marsch (yellow card) 74'; Wolff 83'	Report	Marshall 63'; Gutierrez 68'; Cullen (yellow card) 71'	Stadium: Soldier Field; Attendance: 11,319; Referee: Jose Manuel Garcia Aranda
Note: Match originally scheduled for July 11, 1998

September 10, 1998 28	Dallas Burn	3–2	Chicago Fire	Dallas, Texas
	Kreis 7'; Washington 83'; Rodríguez 90'	Report	Klopas (yellow card) 43'; Razov 49'; Wolff 60'; Okaroh (yellow card) 70'; Keller (yellow card) 74'	Stadium: Cotton Bowl; Attendance: 9,745; Referee: Ali Saheli

September 13, 1998 29	Chicago Fire	3–1	Colorado Rapids	Chicago, Illinois
	Wolff 12', 27'; Razov 15'	Report	Jakins (yellow card) 48'; DiGiamarino 57'; Vaudreuil (yellow card) 78'; Henderson (yellow card) 87'	Stadium: Soldier Field; Attendance: 15,014; Referee: Kevin Terry

September 17, 1998 30	Chicago Fire	1–0	Kansas City Wizards	Chicago, Illinois
	Marsch (yellow card) 34'; Kubík 59' (pen.)	Report	Tinsley (yellow card) 16'	Stadium: Soldier Field; Attendance: 8,283; Referee: Noel Kenny

September 23, 1998 31	Chicago Fire	3–2	New England Revolution	Chicago, Illinois
	Kubík 34' (pen.); Brown (yellow card) 57'; Klopas 74'; Podbrożny (yellow card) 87'; Wolff 89'	Report	Gorter 43'; Burns 68'	Stadium: Soldier Field; Attendance: 11,244; Referee: Michael Kennedy

September 27, 1998 32	Los Angeles Galaxy	1–0	Chicago Fire	Pasadena, California
	Jones 87'	Report		Stadium: Rose Bowl; Attendance: 20,105; Referee: Ali Saheli

=== MLS Cup Playoffs ===
==== Western Conference semifinals ====
October 1, 1998 Game 1	Chicago Fire	1–1 (3–2 SO)	Colorado Rapids	Chicago, Illinois
	Kubík 50' (pen.); Gutiérrez (yellow card) 60'	Report	Bent (yellow card) 26'; Trittschuh (yellow card) 49'; Bravo (yellow card) 66'; Sáenz 79'	Stadium: Soldier Field; Attendance: 12,610; Referee: Kevin Terry
	Shootout
	Kubík (penalty missed); Soehn (penalty scored); Klopas (penalty scored); Wolff (penalty missed); Kuhn (penalty missed); Marsch (penalty scored)		(penalty scored) Bravo; (penalty missed) Sáenz; (penalty scored) Henderson; (penalty missed) Vaudreuil; (penalty missed) Harris; (penalty missed) Vermes

October 5, 1998 Game 2	Colorado Rapids	0–1	Chicago Fire	Denver, Colorado
	Trittschuh (yellow card) 10'	Report	Wolff (yellow card) 18'; Kubík 24' (pen.); Marsch (yellow card) 66'; Armas (yellow card) 75'	Stadium: Mile High Stadium; Attendance: 6,582; Referee: Noel Kenny

==== Western Conference finals ====
October 10, 1998 Game 1	Los Angeles Galaxy	0–1	Chicago Fire	Pasadena, California
	Franchino (yellow card) 65'	Report	Armas (yellow card) 41'; Kubík (yellow card) 68'; Marsch 86'	Stadium: Rose Bowl; Attendance: 25,107; Referee: Kevin Terry

October 16, 1998 Game 2	Chicago Fire	1–1 (2–1 SO)	Los Angeles Galaxy	Chicago, Illinois
	Nowak 31'	Report	Pena 37', (yellow card) 50'	Stadium: Soldier Field; Attendance: 32,744; Referee: Paul Tamberino
	Shootout
	Nowak (penalty missed); Razov (penalty missed); Soehn (penalty missed); Marsch (penalty scored); Podbrożny (penalty scored)		(penalty missed) Jones; (penalty scored) Wélton; (penalty missed) Machón; (penalty missed) Cienfuegos; (penalty missed) Vanney

==== MLS Cup ====
October 25, 1998 MLS Cup	Chicago Fire	2–0	D.C. United	Pasadena, California
	Podbrożny 29'; Razov (yellow card) 31'; Gutiérrez 45', (yellow card) 50'; Marsch (yellow card) 60'	Report	Sanneh (yellow card) 25'; Etcheverry (yellow card) 33'	Stadium: Rose Bowl; Attendance: 51,350; Referee: Kevin Terry

=== U.S. Open Cup ===
July 6, 1998 Third round	Chicago Stingers (Illinois)	1–3	(Illinois) Chicago Fire	Arlington Heights, Illinois

July 22, 1998 Quarterfinals	Chicago Fire (Illinois)	1–1 (a.e.t.) (4–3 p)	(California) San Jose Clash	Dallas, Texas
	Kubík (yellow card) 48', (goal) 55'		Baicher 65'; Gough (yellow card) 94'; Draguicevich (yellow card) 99'	Stadium: Cotton Bowl; Attendance: 3,812; Referee: Kevin Terry
	Penalties
	Kubík (penalty scored); Wolff (penalty missed); Razov (penalty scored); Kuhn (penalty scored); Gutiérrez (penalty scored)		(penalty scored) Medved; (penalty missed) Wynalda; (penalty scored) Mella; (penalty scored) Cerritos; (penalty missed) Gough

August 4, 1998 Semifinals	Chicago Fire (Illinois)	3–2	(Texas) Dallas Burn	Metairie, Louisiana
	Razov 11'; Gutiérrez (yellow card) 40' (red card) 66'; Okaroh (yellow card) 45'; Kosecki 56', (yellow card) 71' (red card) 71'; Kubík 74'		Trotman 23', (yellow card) 44'; Pollard (yellow card) 34'; Deering (yellow card) 40'; Kreis (red card) 52'; Álvarez 83' (pen.)	Stadium: Zephyr Field; Attendance: 6,514; Referee: Rich Grady

October 30, 1998 Final	Chicago Fire (Illinois)	2–1 (a.e.t.)	(Ohio) Columbus Crew	Chicago, Illinois
	Keller (yellow card) 17'; Podbrożny 45' (pen.); Okaroh (yellow card) 60'; Brown (yellow card) 69'; Klopas 99'		Sommer (yellow card) 43'; John 53'; Maisonneuve (yellow card) 60'; Elcock (yellow card) 61'	Stadium: Soldier Field; Attendance: 18,615; Referee: Arturo Angeles

== Statistics ==
=== Appearances and Goalscorers ===
No.	Pos	Nat	Player	Total		MLS		MLS Cup		US Open Cup	
No.	Pos	Nat	Player	Apps	Goals	Apps	Goals	Apps	Goals	Apps	Goals
14	MF	(United States) USA	Chris Armas	39	1	31	1	5	0	3	0
5	DF	(Czech Republic) CZE	Luboš Kubík	40	11	31	7	5	2	4	2
2	DF	(United States) USA	C. J. Brown	37	2	28	2	5	0	4	0
20	DF	(Nigeria) NGA	Francis Okaroh	33	0	26	0	5	0	2	0
15	MF	(United States) USA	Jesse Marsch	38	3	25+4	2	5	1	4	0
11	FW	(Poland) POL	Roman Kosecki	28	10	25	9	1	0	2	1
9	FW	(Poland) POL	Jerzy Podbrożny	34	8	25+1	6	5	1	3	1
12	FW	(United States) USA	Ante Razov	38	11	24+6	10	5	0	2+1	1
10	MF	(Poland) POL	Piotr Nowak	31	7	24	6	5	1	1+1	0
18	GK	(United States) USA	Zach Thornton	33	0	23+2	0	5	0	3	0
3	DF	(United States) USA	Ritchie Kotschau	26	4	23+1	4	0	0	2	0
41	FW	(United States) USA	Frank Klopas	33	8	17+10	6	1+2	0	2+1	2
8	MF	(United States) USA	Diego Gutiérrez	21	2	8+5	0	5	1	3	1
1	GK	(Mexico) MEX	Jorge Campos	10	0	8+1	0	0	0	1	0
	DF	(United States) USA	Jorge Salcedo	11	0	6+5	0	0	0	0	0
17	DF	(United States) USA	Andrew Lewis	15	0	6+7	0	0	0	2	0
6	DF	(United States) USA	Tom Soehn	11	0	6	0	0+5	0	0	0
25	DF	(United States) USA	Zak Ibsen	34	0	5+22	0	0+3	0	2+2	0
16	FW	(United States) USA	Josh Wolff	23	9	4+10	8	3+2	0	3+1	1
19	MF	(United States) USA	Josh Keller	9	0	3+3	0	0	0	1+2	0
	DF	(United States) USA	Brian Bates	4	0	2+2	0	0	0	0	0
22	FW	(United States) USA	Tony Kuhn	7	0	1+4	0	0+1	0	1	0
24	GK	(United States) USA	Scott Coufal	2	0	1	0	0	0	1	0
7	MF	(United States) USA	Manny Lagos	1	0	0+1	0	0	0	0	0
4	DF	(England) ENG	Michael Richardson	1	0	0+1	0	0	0	0	0

== See also ==
- 1998 in American soccer
