= 1998 in American soccer =

Soccer in the United States
- Season: 1998

The 1998 season was the 86th year of competitive soccer in the United States.

== National team ==
=== Record ===
Competition	GP	W	D	L	GF	GA
FIFA World Cup	3	0	0	3	1	5
CONCACAF Gold Cup	4	3	0	1	6	2
International Friendly	9	3	4	2	8	6
Total	16	6	4	6	15	13

=== Results ===
The home team or the team that is designated as the home team is listed in the left column; the away team is in the right column.

Win Draw Loss

January 24 International Friendly	United States	1 – 0	Sweden	Orlando, Florida
	Wegerle 2'			Stadium: Citrus Bowl; Attendance: 12,773; Referee: Richard Grady (United States)

February 1 Gold Cup Group Stage	United States	3 – 0	Cuba	Oakland, California
	Wegerle 55'; Wynalda 58'; Moore 76' (pen.)			Stadium: Oakland Coliseum; Attendance: 11,234; Referee: Mourad Daami (Tunisia)

February 7 Gold Cup Group Stage	United States	2 – 1	Costa Rica	Oakland, California
	Pope 7'; Preki 78'		Oviedo 56'	Stadium: Oakland Coliseum; Attendance: 36,240; Referee: Mohammed Nazri (Malaysia)

February 10 Gold Cup Semifinal	United States	1 – 0	Brazil	Los Angeles
	Preki 65'			Stadium: Los Angeles Memorial Coliseum; Attendance: 12,298; Referee: Ali Bujsaim (United Arab Emirates)

February 15 Gold Cup Final	United States	0 – 1	Mexico	Los Angeles
			Hernández 43'	Stadium: Los Angeles Memorial Coliseum; Attendance: 91,255; Referee: Ramesh Ramdhan (Trinidad & Tobago)

February 21 International Friendly	United States	0 – 2	Netherlands	Miami, Florida
			de Boer 1'; Seedorf 46'	Stadium: Orange Bowl; Attendance: 20,379

February 25 International Friendly	Belgium	2 – 0	United States	Brussels, Belgium
	Van Kerckhoven 23', 59'			Stadium: King Baudouin Stadium; Attendance: 15,894; Referee: Philippe Kalt (France)

March 14 International Friendly	United States	2 – 2	Paraguay	San Diego, California
	Deering 21'; Balboa 50'		Caniza 15'; Arce 75' (pen.)	Stadium: Qualcomm Stadium; Attendance: 15,253; Referee: Luis Padro Borja (Mexico)

April 22 International Friendly	Austria	0 – 3	United States	Vienna, Austria
			Hejduk 54'; McBride 89'; Reyna 90+3'	Stadium: Ernst-Happel-Stadion; Attendance: 17,000

May 16 International Friendly	United States	0 – 0	North Macedonia	San Jose, California
				Stadium: Spartan Stadium; Attendance: 23,861

May 24 International Friendly	United States	2 – 0	Kuwait	Portland, Oregon
	Stewart 37'; Ramos 82'			Stadium: Civic Stadium; Attendance: 25,343; Referee: Mario Ramírez (Guatemala)

May 30 International Friendly	United States	0 – 0	Scotland	Washington, D.C.
				Stadium: RFK Stadium; Attendance: 46,037

June 15 World Cup Group Stage	Germany	2 – 0	United States	Paris, France
21:00 UTC+01	Möller 8'; Klinsmann 65'			Stadium: Parc des Princes; Attendance: 43,815; Referee: Said Belqola (Morocco)

June 21 World Cup Group Stage	United States	1 – 2	Iran	Lyon, France
21:00 UTC+01	McBride 87'		Estili 40'; Mahdavikia 84'	Stadium: Stade Gerland; Attendance: 44,000; Referee: Urs Meier (Switzerland)

June 25 World Cup Group Stage	United States	0 – 1	FR Yugoslavia	Nantes, France
21:00 UTC+01			Komljenović 4'	Stadium: Stade de la Beaujoire; Attendance: 39,500; Referee: Gamal Al-Ghandour (Egypt)

November 6 International Friendly	United States	0 – 0	Australia	San Jose, California
				Stadium: Spartan Stadium; Attendance: 15,074; Referee: Mike Siefert (Canada)

=== Goalscorers ===
Player	Goals
Roy Wegerle	2
Preki	2
Brian McBride	2
Eric Wynalda	1
Joe-Max Moore	1
Eddie Pope	1
Chad Deering	1
Marcelo Balboa	1
Frankie Hejduk	1
Paul Bravo	1
Claudio Reyna	1
Ernie Stewart	1
Tab Ramos	1

== Major League Soccer ==
=== Standings ===
Eastern Conference	P	W	SW	SL	L	WIR	SO	LIR	GF	GA	GD	APts	Pts
D.C. United	32	24	<7	3>	8	17	10	5	81	51	30	61	58
Columbus Crew	32	15	<0	5>	17	15	5	12	67	61	6	50	45
MetroStars	32	15	<3	4>	17	12	7	13	57	63	-6	43	39
Miami Fusion	32	15	<5	0>	17	10	5	17	51	68	-17	35	35
x-Tampa Bay Mutiny	32	12	<1	5>	20	11	6	15	47	62	-15	39	34
x-New England Revolution	32	11	<2	4>	21	9	6	17	53	70	-15	33	29

Western Conference	P	W	SW	SL	L	WIR	SO	LIR	GF	GA	GD	APts	Pts
Los Angeles Galaxy	32	24	<2	2>	8	22	4	6	85	44	41	70	68
Chicago Fire	32	20	<2	1>	12	18	3	11	62	45	17	57	56
Colorado Rapids	32	16	<2	2>	16	14	4	14	62	69	-7	46	44
Dallas Burn	32	15	<4	2>	17	11	6	15	43	59	-16	39	37
x-San Jose Clash	32	13	<3	5>	19	10	8	14	48	60	-12	38	33
x-Kansas City Wizards	32	12	<2	4>	20	10	6	16	45	50	-5	36	32

- The top four teams in each conference make the playoffs.

Wins (W) are worth 3 points.
Shootout Wins (SW) are worth 1 point, and is considered a Win in the standings.
Shootout Loss (SL) are worth 0 points, and is considered a Loss in the standings.
Loss (L) are worth 0 points.

=== Playoffs ===
Conference Semifinals
1	D.C. United (a.e.t.), (3 – 2 S.O.)*	2	1*	x
4	Miami Fusion	1	0	x
Eastern Conference
2	Columbus Crew (a.e.t.), (3 – 2 S.O.)*	5	2*	x
3	MetroStars	3	1	x
1	Los Angeles Galaxy	6	3	x
4	Dallas Burn	1	2	x
Western Conference
2	Chicago Fire	2	1	x
3	Colorado Rapids	1	0	x

Conference Finals
1	D.C. United	2	2	3
2	Columbus Crew	0	4	0
1	Los Angeles Galaxy	0	1	x
2	Chicago Fire (a.e.t.), (2 – 1 S.O.)*	1	2*	x

MLS Cup '98
E	D.C. United	0
W	Chicago Fire	2

- Best of Three series winners will advance.

=== MLS Cup ===
October 25

D.C. United	0 – 2	Chicago Fire
		Podbrożny 29'; Gutiérrez 45'

Rose Bowl, Pasadena, California
Attendance: 51,350

== Lamar Hunt U.S. Open Cup ==
=== Bracket ===
Home teams listed on top of bracket

Second round
A-L	Hershey Wildcats	2
PDL	Chicago Stingers	3
A-L	El Paso Patriots	9
PDL	Arizona Sahuaros	1
A-L	Orange County Zodiac	2
PDL	Austin Lone Stars	1
A-L	Nashville Metros	7
PDL	Delaware Wizards	1
A-L	Milwaukee Rampage	1
PDL	Orlando Nighthawks	2
PDL	Western Mass Pioneers	1
A-L	Rochester Rhinos	3
A-L	Hampton Roads Mariners (aet, PSO)	0 (3)
PDL	Central Jersey Riptide	0 (2)
A-L	Worcester Wildfire	2
PDL	Charlotte Eagles	0

Third round
PDL	Chicago Stingers	1
MLS	Chicago Fire S.C.	3
A-L	El Paso Patriots	0
MLS	San Jose Clash	2
MLS	Dallas Burn	4
A-L	Orange County Zodiac	0
A-L	Nashville Metros	3
MLS	Kansas City Wizards	1
MLS	Miami Fusion	3
PDL	Orlando Nighthawks	0
A-L	Rochester Rhinos	1
MLS	Columbus Crew (ASDET)	2
MLS	MetroStars (ASDET)	1
A-L	Hampton Roads Mariners	0
MLS	Tampa Bay Mutiny (ASDET, PSO)	2 (5)
PDL	Worcester Wildfire	2 (4)

Quarterfinals
MLS	Chicago Fire (ASDET, PSO)	1 (4)
MLS	San Jose Clash	1 (3)
MLS	Dallas Burn	5
A-L	Nashville Metros	1
MLS	Columbus Crew	3
MLS	Miami Fusion	0
MLS	MetroStars	4
MLS	Tampa Bay Mutiny	0

Semifinals
MLS	Chicago Fire S.C.	3
MLS	Dallas Burn	2
MLS	Columbus Crew	1
MLS	MetroStars	0

Finals
MLS	Chicago Fire S.C. (ASDET)	2
MLS	Columbus Crew	1

=== Final ===
October 30

Columbus Crew	1 – 2 ASDET	Chicago Fire
John 53'		Podbrożny 45' (pen.); Klopas 99'

Soldier Field, Chicago
Attendance: 18,615
Referee: Arturo Angeles

== American clubs in international competitions ==
Club	Competition	Final round
D.C. United	CONCACAF Champions' Cup	Final
Colorado Rapids	CONCACAF Champions' Cup	Qualifying Round

=== D.C. United ===
August 11 Champions' Cup Quarterfinal	D.C. United	8 – 0	(Trinidad and Tobago) Joe Public	Washington, D.C.
	Olsen 13', 44'; Lassiter 22', 29', 67', 72'; Wood 75', 90+2'			Stadium: RFK Stadium

August 14 Champions' Cup Semifinal	D.C. United	2 – 0	(Mexico) León	Washington, D.C.
	Lassiter 12', 61'			Stadium: RFK Stadium

August 16 Champions' Cup Final	D.C. United	1 – 0	(Mexico) Toluca	Washington, D.C.
	Pope 41'			Stadium: RFK Stadium

=== Colorado Rapids ===
June 28 Champions' Cup qualifying round	Colorado Rapids	1 – 0	(Mexico) León	Denver, Colorado
	Balboa 83'			Stadium: Mile High Stadium

July 15 Champions' Cup qualifying round	León (Mexico)	4 – 2	Colorado Rapids	León, Mexico
	Bejines 30'; Romero 38'; Trittschuh 42' (o.g.); Cadena 53'			Stadium: Estadio Nou Camp
