= 1998 U.S. Open Cup final =

1998 final of the Lamar Hunt U.S. Open Cup

- Event: 1998 U.S. Open Cup
Chicago Fire MLS	Columbus Crew MLS
2	1
- Date: October 30, 1998
- Venue: Soldier Field, Chicago, Illinois
- Referee: Arturo Angeles
- Attendance: 18,615

The 1998 U.S. Open Cup final was the 85th final of the Lamar Hunt U.S. Open Cup, the United States's oldest soccer cup competition. The match, contested by the Chicago Fire and Columbus Crew, took place on October 30, 1998, at Soldier Field in Chicago, Illinois. It was Chicago's and the Crew's first U.S. Open Cup campaign and their first final in the U.S. Open Cup. The Chicago Fire won the game 2–1 in overtime thanks to goals from Jerzy Podbrożny and Frank Klopas while the Crew goal came from Stern John.

Fire defender, C. J. Brown, was named the Man of the Match after the game.

The final was originally scheduled to take place on August 26, 1998, in Virginia Beach, Virginia, but was postponed by a day after the arrival of Hurricane Bonnie. After a second postponement, the match was moved to Chicago despite objections from the Columbus Crew front office.

== Match ==
=== Details ===
October 30, 1998

Chicago Fire	2–1 (a.e.t.)	Columbus Crew
Podbrożny 45' (pen.); Klopas 99'	Report	John 53'

Soldier Field, Chicago, Illinois
Attendance: 18,615
Referee: Arturo Angeles

Chicago Fire	Columbus Crew

GK	(United States) Zach Thornton
RB	(Czech Republic) Luboš Kubík	(substituted off) 14'
CB	(United States) C. J. Brown
CB	(Nigeria) Francis Okaroh
LB	(United States) Chris Armas
MF	(United States) Jesse Marsch
MF	(United States) Ritchie Kotschau	(substituted off) 91'
MF	(Poland) Piotr Nowak
MF	(United States) Josh Wolff
CF	'	(United States) Ante Razov
CF	(Poland) Jerzy Podbrożny
Substitutes:
MF	(United States) Josh Keller	(substituted on) 14'	(substituted off) 77'
MF	(United States) Zak Ibsen	(substituted on) 77'
FW	(United States) Frank Klopas	(substituted on) 91'
Manager:
(United States) Bob Bradley

GK	(United States) Juergen Sommer
RB	(United States) Mike Clark
CB	(United States) Thomas Dooley
CB	(Argentina) Ricardo Iribarren
LB	(Trinidad and Tobago) Ansil Elcock
MF	(Poland) Robert Warzycha	(substituted off) 78'
MF	(Jamaica) Andy Williams
MF	(United States) Brian Maisonneuve	(substituted off) 67'
MF	(United States) Rob Smith
FW	(Trinidad and Tobago) Stern John
FW	(United States) Brian McBride
Substitutes:
MF	(United States) Todd Yeagley	(substituted on) 67'
MF	(United States) Jason Farrell	(substituted on) 78'
Manager:
(United States) Tom Fitzgerald

Match officials

- Assistant referees:
  - Michael Kennedy
  - Alberto Echeverria

Match rules

- 90 minutes.
- Overtime if necessary.
- Maximum of three substitutions.
