= MLS Cup 1998 =

1998 edition of the MLS Cup

- Event: MLS Cup
Chicago Fire	D.C. United
2	0
- Date: October 25, 1998
- Venue: Rose Bowl, Pasadena, California, U.S.
- MLS Cup MVP: Piotr Nowak (Chicago Fire)
- Attendance: 51,350
- Weather: Partly cloudy, 74 °F (23 °C)

MLS Cup 1998 was the third edition of the MLS Cup, the championship match of Major League Soccer (MLS) in the United States. It took place on October 25, 1998, at the Rose Bowl in Pasadena, California, with an attendance of 51,350 people. The final was contested by two-time reigning champions D.C. United and the Chicago Fire, the first expansion team to reach the final. Chicago won the match 2–0, with goals scored by Jerzy Podbrożny and Diego Gutiérrez in the first half.

Chicago became the first expansion team to win the MLS Cup and the second to complete a domestic double by winning the U.S. Open Cup. D.C. in turn became the first team to reach three consecutive finals, which would be their last under manager Bruce Arena. The match was broadcast nationally on ABC, where it was watched by an estimated 1 million households.

As the top two finishers in the MLS Cup Playoffs, both D.C. and Chicago qualified for the 1999 CONCACAF Champions' Cup. The clubs faced off once again in the third-place match of the continental tournament, which ended in a 2–2 draw.

== Venue ==
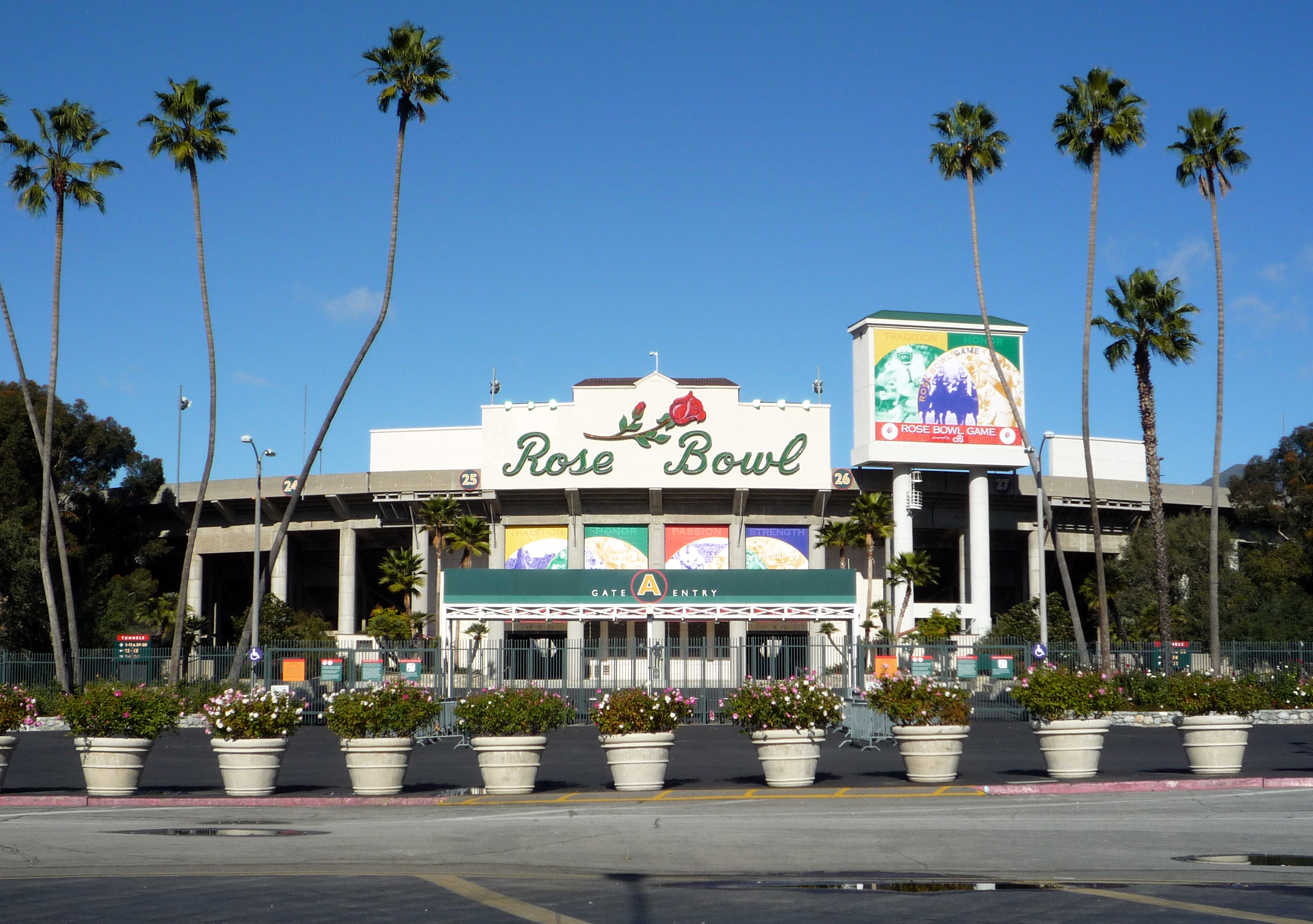
The Rose Bowl hosted the MLS Cup final for the first time.

The Rose Bowl in Pasadena, California, was announced as the host venue for MLS Cup 1998 on October 25, 1997. It was to be the first time that the MLS Cup would be played in the Western United States. The stadium, primarily used for American football, was the home of the Los Angeles Galaxy until they moved to the Home Depot Center in 2003. The Rose Bowl had also hosted major international soccer events, including the 1984 Summer Olympics gold medal match, the 1994 FIFA World Cup Final, and was selected as the venue of the 1999 FIFA Women's World Cup Final.

The stadium was converted from college football to soccer use in eight days, with yard lines covered by green paint to decrease their visibility. The Galaxy missed their opportunity to play for the MLS Cup at home after their loss to Chicago in the Western Conference Final. Despite projections that the final would be played in front of a smaller crowd, the attendance of 51,350 surpassed the 1997 final. One day before the final, the first Supporters Summit was hosted in Pasadena between fans and MLS officials to discuss rule changes and the direction of the league. The summit was also where funding for the Supporters' Shield trophy was finalized ahead of its debut in the 1999 season.

== Road to the final ==
The MLS Cup is the post-season championship of Major League Soccer (MLS), a professional club soccer league based in the United States that began play in 1996. The league's third season was contested by 12 teams organized into two conferences, each playing 32 matches during the regular season from April to September. Teams faced opponents from the same conference four times during the regular season and from outside their conference twice. The season was the first to be played during a FIFA World Cup, necessitating a lighter schedule for two weeks in June.

MLS continued to use the modified version of the sport's rules that it adopted for the 1996 season, including a penalty shootout from 35 yards (32 m) to decide tied matches (for which the winners earned one point) and a countdown clock that stopped during dead plays. The top four teams from each conference qualified for the playoffs, which were organized into three rounds and played primarily in October. The first two rounds, named the Conference Semifinals and Conference Finals, were home-and-away series organized into a best-of-three format with a hosting advantage for the higher seed. The winners of the Conference Finals advanced to the single-match MLS Cup final, which would be held at a predetermined neutral venue.

MLS Cup 1998 was contested by two-time defending champions D.C. United of the Eastern Conference and the Chicago Fire, an expansion team that finished second in the Western Conference. Chicago was led by Bob Bradley, former assistant to D.C. United head coach Bruce Arena. The two teams met twice during the regular season, resulting in 3–1 and 4–1 victories for D.C. United.

=== Chicago Fire ===
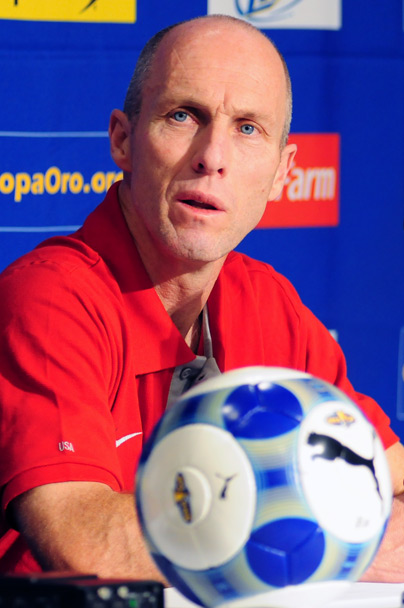
Former D.C. United assistant Bob Bradley was hired as the first head coach of the Chicago Fire

The Chicago Fire and Miami Fusion were the first expansion teams in MLS history, entering during the 1998 season and split between the Western and Eastern conferences, respectively. The two teams participated in the expansion draft, where Chicago selected two players from the Los Angeles Galaxy who were later traded back in exchange for goalkeeper Jorge Campos and midfielder Chris Armas. The league allocated several international players to the Fire, including the Polish trio of midfielder Peter Nowak, striker Jerzy Podbrożny, and forward Roman Kosecki, who formed the "Eastern Bloc" alongside Czech midfielder Luboš Kubík.

The team won their first two games, against the Miami Fusion and Tampa Bay Mutiny, but fell into a five-match losing streak that lasted until early May. The losing streak was worsened by a scoring drought, as the Fire went 272 minutes without a goal until scoring four during a match against the Colorado Rapids that ended in a shootout defeat. Chicago's offensive pair of Nowak and Kosecki were also frequent targets of fouls, picking up injuries and suspensions during a loss to D.C. United in early May that elicited complaints from manager Bob Bradley over missed calls from the referee.

The Fire broke their losing streak with a victory over the Tampa Bay Mutiny, which marked the beginning of an 11-match winning streak that set a new MLS record. The streak included consistent scoring from Nowak, who was named Player of the Month in May, and several shutouts from goalkeeper Zach Thornton, who would be competing for the starting position with Campos. By the end of May, the team had risen to second place in the Western Conference standings behind the Los Angeles Galaxy, who they defeated twice. Chicago were unable to surpass the Galaxy in the standings, but were able to open a 18-point lead over the third-place Dallas Burn by defeating them three times in a three-week period by early July.

The winning streak ended with a loss to the Columbus Crew in July, which was followed by five consecutive defeats that were mostly played away from home. Chicago were without several key players who picked up injuries, including Nowak with a sprained knee that sidelined him for seven matches. The team remained in second place and eight points ahead of third-place Colorado by early August, and entered September on a four-match winning streak with help from rookie striker Josh Wolff as a substitute. Chicago ultimately finished the regular season in second place with a 20–12 record, behind league-leading Los Angeles. For the team's performance in the regular season, four players were named to the MLS Best XI, Bob Bradley earned Coach of the Year, Thornton won Goalkeeper of the Year, and Kubík was named Defender of the Year.

Chicago entered the playoffs without goalkeeper Jorge Campos, who had returned to UNAM Pumas in Mexico, and faced Colorado in the Conference Semifinals. The first leg, played at Soldier Field, was tied 1–1 at the end of regulation time with a penalty kick from Kubík in the 50th minute and a Rapids equalizer by Waldir Sáenz in the 79th minute. The match was decided in a shootout that was won 3–2 by the Fire after a conversion by Jesse Marsch in the sixth round. Chicago finished a two-game sweep of the series with a 1–0 victory at Mile High Stadium in Denver during the second leg, taking the lead with another Kubík penalty kick and several saves by Thornton to keep the shutout.

The Fire then played against the Galaxy in the Western Conference Final, which began with a 1–0 Chicago victory at the Rose Bowl that was decided by a late header scored by Jesse Marsch off a free kick. The second leg was played in front of 32,744 fans at Chicago's Soldier Field, setting a new league playoff record, and resulted in another series sweep as the Fire advanced to the MLS Cup final. The team took the lead in the 31st minute through a goal by Nowak, who finished a rebound off goalkeeper Kevin Hartman, but Danny Pena equalized six minutes later for the Galaxy. The match remained tied 1–1 and went to a shootout, where Zach Thornton made three saves to allow Jerzy Podbrożny to win it 2–1 for Chicago in the fifth round.

=== D.C. United ===
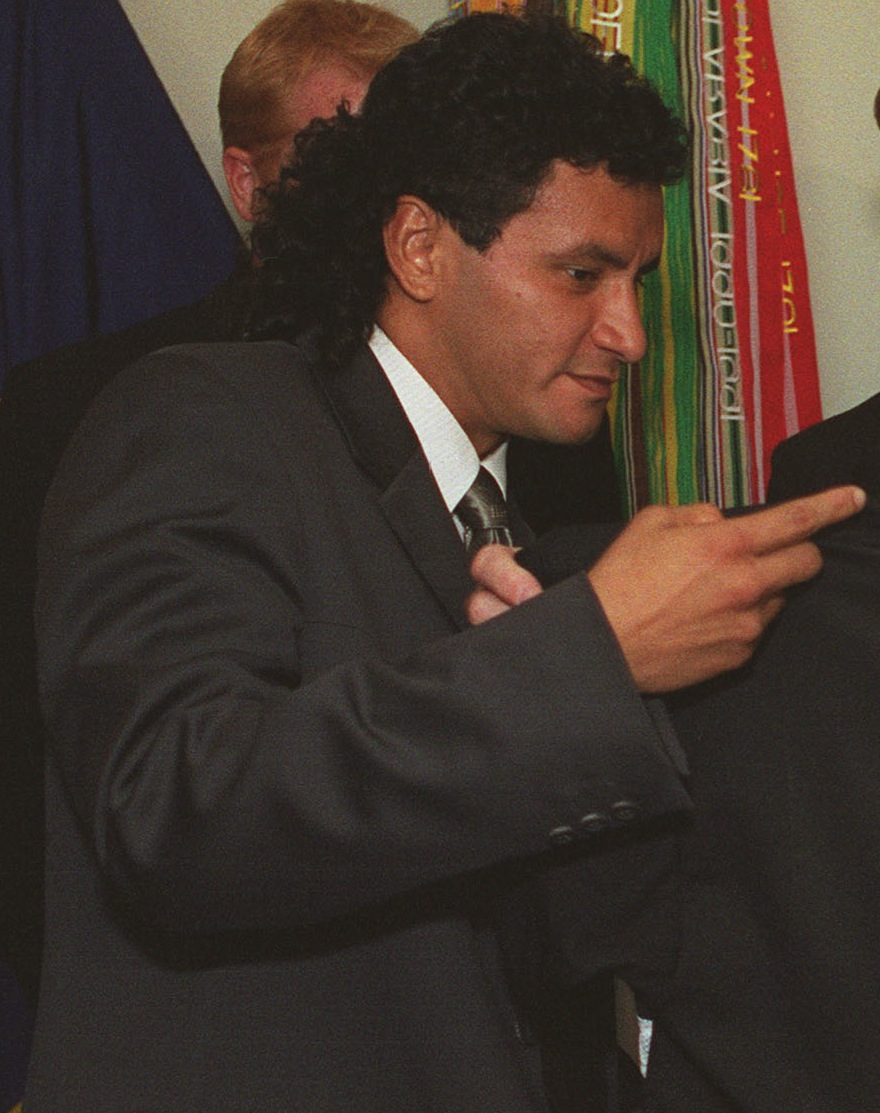
Marco Etcheverry was named the league's most valuable player for his 19 assists and 10 goals for D.C. United

D.C. lost six members of their cup-winning roster in the 1997–98 offseason, including striker Raúl Díaz Arce and midfielder Ben Iroha to comply with salary cap limitations and three players picked by Miami in the expansion draft. The team responded by signing college players Carey Talley and Ben Olsen, as well as veteran defender Geoff Aunger and forward A. J. Wood. Defender Eddie Pope was also absent for the first weeks of the season after undergoing surgery to remove a cyst in his foot. United later acquired forward Roy Lassiter, a former Golden Boot winner, in a trade with Tampa Bay for Roy Wegerle.

United opened their third season on the road to Miami, winning 2–0 but losing Jaime Moreno to a red card suspension. The team won their next two matches to extend a winning streak that began in the 1997 playoffs, but lost in their fourth match against the Columbus Crew. D.C. would then lose only two of their next nine matches as they took first place in the Eastern Conference, despite losing several starting players to injuries and suspensions for yellow card accumulation. Starting defender Eddie Pope, who had recovered from his injury, and midfielder Jeff Agoos were called up to the U.S. national team for the 1998 World Cup, departing from the team in mid-May and missing six matches.

Without Pope and Agoos, manager Bruce Arena used several lineups with reserve players and different formations, but the team ended their home winning streak in June by losing to the Dallas Burn in a shootout after a 4–4 draw. During a three-match stretch in June, D.C. conceded 10 goals in the shootout loss against Dallas, a 4–3 shootout win against Columbus and a 3–1 loss to Colorado. United remained atop the Eastern Conference, with only four points above second place, and regained Agoos and Pope in July at the start of a nine-match winning streak that lasted two months. The team also hosted the 1998 CONCACAF Champions' Cup and became the first U.S. team to win the continental tournament.

D.C. provided eight players and Arena for the 1998 MLS All-Star Game, which was contested by teams of American and international players from MLS. United also became the earliest team in MLS history to clinch a playoff berth, doing so on August 7 by winning 1–0 in Dallas. Following the end of the streak, the team lost Agoos, Pope, and playmaker Marco Etcheverry to injuries but won three of its remaining four matches. United finished the regular season with a 24–8 record and 58 points, 13 ahead of the second-place Columbus. D.C. and Los Angeles set a league record with their 24 wins, but the Galaxy's fewer shootouts allowed them to clinch first in the overall standings. Etcheverry earned the league's Most Valuable Player Award for his 19 assists and 10 goals, while Ben Olsen was named Rookie of the Year.

United faced the Miami Fusion in the Eastern Conference Semifinals but remained without Agoos, Pope, Etcheverry, and forward Tony Sanneh, who was injured in the regular season finale. Arena also swapped out starting goalkeeper and league shutout leader Scott Garlick for backup Tom Presthus, who had a stronger record in shootouts. D.C. won 2–1 at home in the first leg of the series with a pair of goals in the first half from Roy Lassiter and Jamie Moreno while successfully suppressing the Miami offense. The second leg in Miami ended scoreless in regulation time after Lassiter was ejected in the third minute and several shots hit the crossbar. United won 2–2 in the shootout to advance, with two saves from Presthus to allow Agoos to score the winning penalty in the fifth round.

The Eastern Conference Final paired D.C. United against the Columbus Crew, who had defeated the MetroStars to set up a rematch of the previous year's conference final. United hosted the Crew in the first leg and won 2–0 with a pair of second-half goals from Sanneh and Etcheverry to complement a strong defensive performance that shut out league scoring leaders Stern John and Brian McBride. The second leg marked the end of D.C.'s 13-match playoff winning streak after the team lost 4–2 to the home side on the narrow pitch at Ohio Stadium in Columbus. The result was blamed on a poor defending that allowed the Crew to build a 3–0 lead in under 50 minutes that was later cut to one goal by Sanneh and Lassiter before a final goal for Columbus in the 81st minute. United clinched its third consecutive MLS Cup appearance through a 3–0 in the third leg, played again at home in Washington, D.C. The home team dominated possession and struck first with an Agoos goal in the 11th minute and followed up with a brace by Lassiter that culminated in converting an intercepted backpass in the 79th minute.

=== Summary of results ===
Note: In all results below, the score of the finalist is given first (H: home; A: away). Playoffs were in best-of-three format with penalty shootout if scores were tied.

Chicago Fire				Round	D.C. United			
2nd place in Western Conference: Pos. / Club / Pld. / W / SW / L / Pts.; 1 / Los Angeles Galaxy (SS) / 32 / 24 / 2 / 8 / 68; 2 / Chicago Fire / 32 / 20 / 2 / 12 / 56; 3 / Colorado Rapids / 32 / 16 / 2 / 16 / 44; 4 / Dallas Burn / 32 / 15 / 2 / 17 / 37; 5 / San Jose Clash / 32 / 13 / 4 / 19 / 33; Source: MLS Qualified for playoffs Supporters' Shield winner				Regular season	1st place in Eastern Conference: Pos. / Club / Pld. / W / SW / L / Pts.; 1 / D.C. United / 32 / 24 / 7 / 8 / 58; 2 / Columbus Crew / 32 / 15 / 0 / 17 / 45; 3 / NY/NJ MetroStars / 32 / 15 / 3 / 17 / 39; 4 / Miami Fusion / 32 / 15 / 5 / 17 / 35; 5 / Tampa Bay Mutiny / 32 / 12 / 1 / 20 / 34; Source: MLS Qualified for playoffs			
Opponent	1st leg	2nd leg	3rd leg	MLS Cup Playoffs	Opponent	1st leg	2nd leg	3rd leg
Colorado Rapids (2–0)	1–1 (3–2 SO) (H)	1–0 (A)	—	Conference Semifinals	Miami Fusion (2–0)	2–1 (H)	0–0 (3–2 SO) (A)	—
Los Angeles Galaxy (2–0)	1–0 (A)	1–1 (2–1 SO) (H)	—	Conference Finals	Columbus Crew (2–1)	2–0 (H)	2–4 (A)	3–0 (H)

== Broadcasting ==
The MLS Cup final was broadcast in the United States on ABC with English commentary and Spanish via secondary audio programming. For the third consecutive year, the ABC broadcast was led by play-by-play announcer Phil Schoen and color commentator Ty Keough, who were joined by field reporters Seamus Malin and Bill McDermott. The quartet had worked together on the network's World Cup broadcasts. The television broadcast drew a 1.2 national rating and reached an estimated 1 million households, a 33 percent decrease from previous finals.

The match was also broadcast by local radio affiliates in multiple languages. In Chicago, WZCH carried the English broadcast, WRZA carried Spanish commentary, and WKTA had the match in Polish. The Spanish broadcast was aired on WACA in Washington, D.C., and the surrounding area.

== Match ==
=== Summary ===
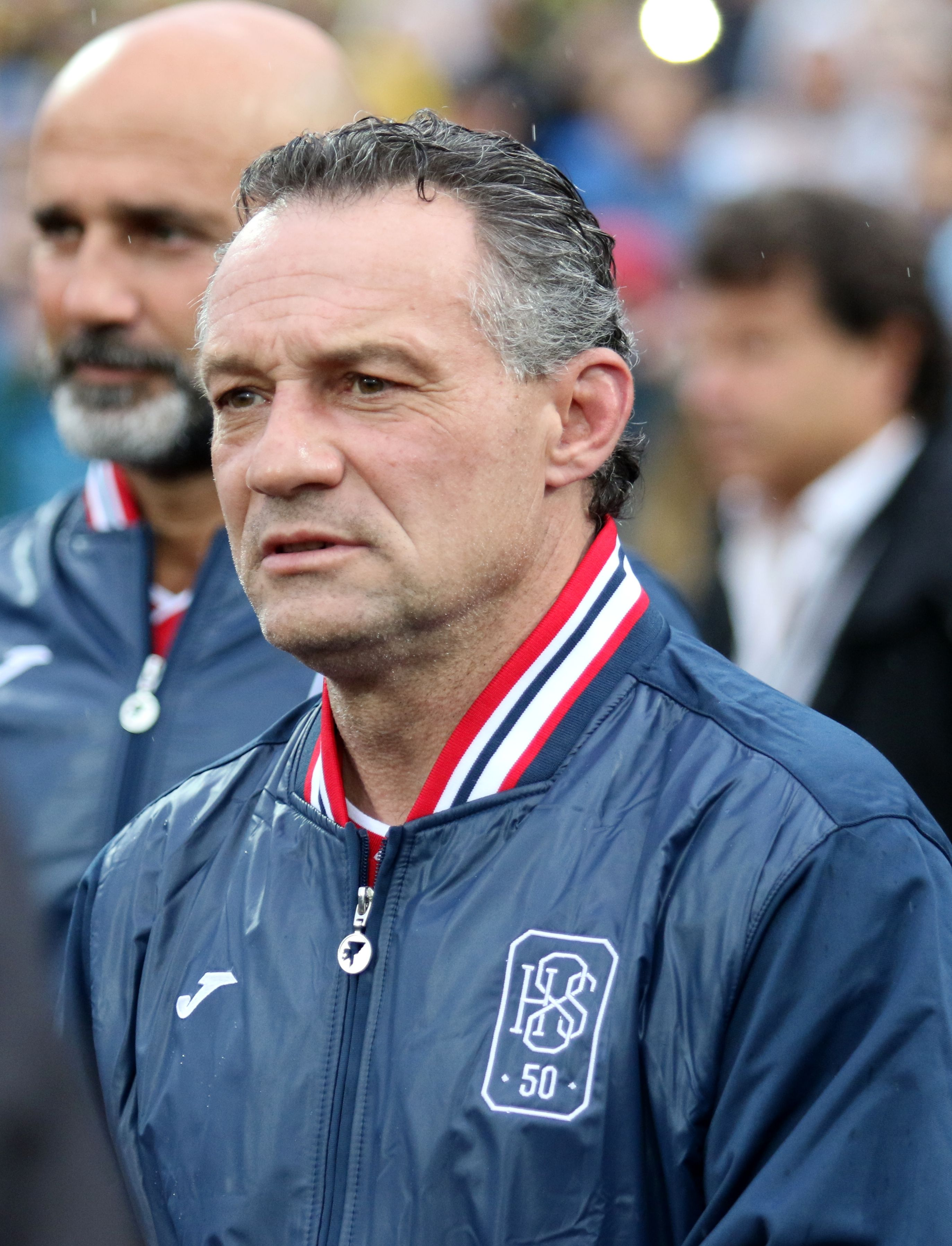
Chicago captain Piotr Nowak was named the MLS Cup Most Valuable Player for his two assists

The MLS Cup final was played on a warm and sunny afternoon at the Rose Bowl, unlike the rainy weather in the first two cups, in front of 51,350 spectators. Chicago played in their red home kit, while D.C. was assigned their white away kit. United, as two-time defending champions, entered the final as favorites and used an attack-oriented style. The Fire relied on stronger defending and counterattacks, including from recovered winger Roman Kosecki as a surprise starter, and had five more days to rest after clinching the Western Conference title.

D.C. kicked off the match at 12:30 p.m. and went on an immediate attack that resulted in a shot by Jaime Moreno that flew over the crossbar within 15 seconds. Their attacks continued, earning them a corner kick in the third minute that was deflected away by Chicago goalkeeper Zach Thornton. A rebound shot by Tony Sanneh was blocked and fell to Marco Etcheverry, who tripped in the six-yard (5.5 m) box after a challenge by Luboš Kubík, but no penalty was called by referee Kevin Terry. Chicago's first scoring chance came in the sixth minute as Piotr Nowak delivered a low cross into the box that was deflected towards goal by Chris Armas, only to be cleared off the line by defender Jeff Agoos.

After a header by Sanneh nearly broke the deadlock for United in the tenth minute, the Fire's "Eastern Bloc" took control of the midfield and pushed for their own chances. Jerzy Podbrożny's shot in the 14th minute was saved by Tom Presthus, while an effort by Ante Razov hit the post four minutes later. Chicago scored the match's first goal in the 29th minute following a build-up from their half and several one-touch passes, culminating in a give-and-go pass from Razov to Nowak in the penalty area. Nowak drew out Presthus and passed sideways to an unmarked Podbrożny for a tap-in from six yards (5.5 m).

United looked to quickly score an equalizer and earned set-piece chances, but the resulting headers from Roy Lassiter and Jaime Moreno went off target. With one minute remaining in the first half, the Fire pushed up on a counterattack through the center midfield to score their second goal of the match. Podbrożny drew in several defenders near the center circle and poked the ball to Razov, who laid it off for Armas to pass it forwards to Nowak. After a run up the left wing, Nowak cut in towards the center of the penalty area and shot between several players, including Diego Gutiérrez, who deflected the ball into the goal. United protested the goal, arguing that the deflection had been off Gutiérrez's arm and Razov had been in an offside position while blocking the sight of Presthus, but Terry's decision was unchanged.

Chicago entered the second half with momentum from their two goals and dropped to a more defensive position while being outshot 13–4 by D.C., including six shots on target. Zach Thornton ultimately made eight saves to record a shutout, including a pair of headers from Roy Lassiter in the 48th and 76th minutes. Another Lassiter header in the 56th minute struck defender Francis Okaroh's hand, but a penalty was not awarded due to his unintentional positioning. Armas was assigned to tightly mark Marco Etcheverry, preventing him from creating plays for United and limiting the league MVP's involvement in attacks. D.C. pushed further forward as time ran out, but were stifled by the Fire defense as the team lost by a score of 2–0. Manager Bruce Arena congratulated Chicago on their performance but criticized the officiating of the match, including the no-call penalties and the offside positions during the second goal. Nowak was named the MLS Cup Most Valuable Player for his two assists.

=== Details ===
October 25, 1998
12:30 p.m. PST

Chicago Fire	2–0	D.C. United
Podbrożny 29'; Gutiérrez 45'	Report (Archived)

Rose Bowl, Pasadena, California
Attendance: 51,350
Referee: Kevin Terry

Chicago Fire	D.C. United

GK	18	(United States) Zach Thornton
RB	2	(United States) C.J. Brown
CB	5	(Czech Republic) Luboš Kubík
CB	20	(Nigeria) Francis Okaroh
LB	8	(United States) Diego Gutiérrez	(yellow card) 50'
RM	14	(United States) Chris Armas
CM	15	(United States) Jesse Marsch	(yellow card) 60'
CM	9	(Poland) Jerzy Podbrożny
LM	10	(Poland) Piotr Nowak (c)	(substituted off) 85'
CF	11	(Poland) Roman Kosecki	(substituted off) 56'
CF	12	(United States) Ante Razov	(yellow card) 31'	(substituted off) 74'
Substitutes:
FW	41	(United States) Frank Klopas	(substituted on) 56'
MF	6	(United States) Tom Soehn	(substituted on) 74'
FW	16	(United States) Josh Wolff	(substituted on) 85'
Manager:
(United States) Bob Bradley

GK	22	(United States) Tom Presthus
RB	20	(United States) Tony Sanneh	(yellow card) 25'	(substituted off) 70'
CB	23	(United States) Eddie Pope
CB	18	(United States) Carlos Llamosa	(substituted off) 81'
LB	12	(United States) Jeff Agoos
RM	14	(United States) Ben Olsen
DM	16	(United States) Richie Williams
AM	10	(Bolivia) Marco Etcheverry (c)	(yellow card) 33'
LM	6	(United States) John Harkes
CF	15	(United States) Roy Lassiter
CF	9	(Bolivia) Jaime Moreno
Substitutes:
DF	7	(United States) A.J. Wood	(substituted on) 70'
DF	19	(United States) Mike Slivinski	(substituted on) 81'
Manager:
(United States) Bruce Arena

MLS Cup Most Valuable Player:
Piotr Nowak (Chicago Fire)

Assistant referees:
Chip Reed
Laszio Negy
Fourth official:
Paul Tamberino

Match rules

- 90 minutes of regulation time with a countdown clock.
- Two 15-minute periods of extra time with golden goals to decide a winner.
- Penalty shootout from 35 yards if scores still tied.
- Maximum of three substitutions.

=== Statistics ===
	D.C. United	Chicago Fire
Goals scored	0	2
Total shots	22	10
Shots on target	8	4
Saves	1	8
Possession	52%	48%
Corner kicks	9	9
Fouls committed	8	27
Offsides	1	5
Yellow cards	2	3
Red cards	0	0

== Post-match ==
The Fire became the first expansion team to win a U.S. major league championship and were the second to reach a final after the St. Louis Blues of the National Hockey League in 1968. They were preceded in soccer by the Philadelphia Atoms, an expansion team in the North American Soccer League which won the league championship in 1973. The Fire also became the first Chicago-area sports team besides the Chicago Bulls to win a league championship in over a decade, and the second soccer champions from the area, following the Chicago Sting. The Sting, who won the 1981 and 1984 North American Soccer League championships, included Frank Klopas, a veteran forward who had joined the Fire.

The team returned to Chicago and were honored with a small celebration with 1,200 fans at the Daley Center, which included a meeting with Mayor Richard M. Daley. The Alan Rothenberg Trophy was then displayed at Chicago City Hall for a week. Five days after winning the MLS Cup, Chicago completed their double by defeating the Columbus Crew in the 1998 U.S. Open Cup final. They were the second MLS team to complete a double with the Open Cup, following D.C. United in 1996.

A month after the MLS Cup final, D.C. played in the 1998 Copa Interamericana, where they won against South American champions Vasco da Gama of Brazil over two legs played in the United States. Head coach Bruce Arena left United after the tournament to manage the U.S. national team, with Chicago manager Bob Bradley assisting him during the MLS offseason. Arena was replaced at D.C. by Thomas Rongen, who led the team to a victory at MLS Cup 1999 over Los Angeles. Chicago had qualified for the 1999 playoffs, but were eliminated in the Western Conference Semifinals by the Dallas Burn.

As MLS Cup finalists, Chicago and D.C. qualified for the 1999 CONCACAF Champions' Cup, which was hosted at Sam Boyd Stadium near Las Vegas. The two teams were eliminated in the semifinals and met in the third-place match, where they drew 2–2 while using reserve players; a penalty shootout was not played due to the doubleheader schedule, so both teams were named third-place finishers.
