= Prosymna (village) =

Prosymna Πρόσυμνα
- Community
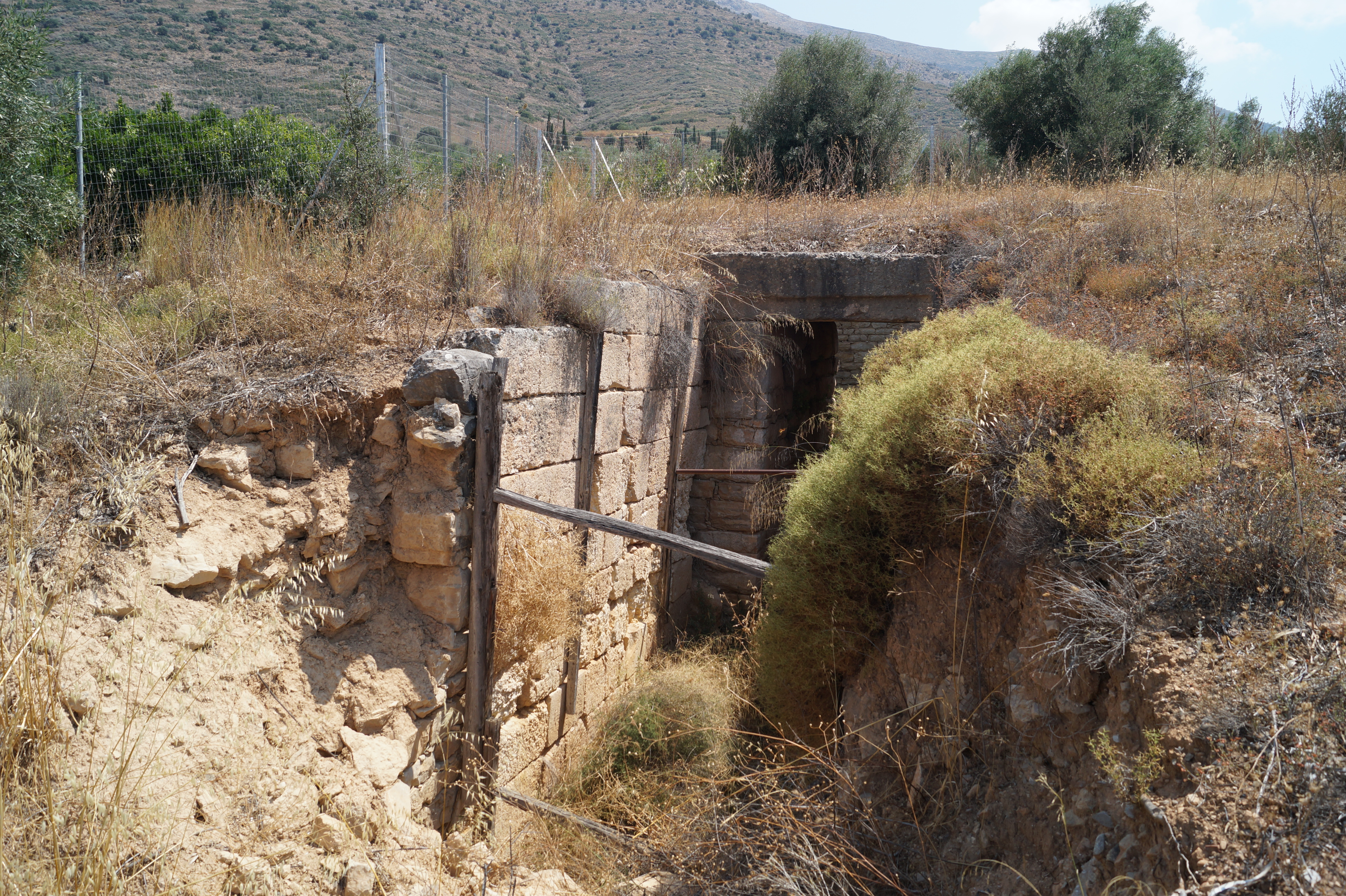
- Ruins of the wall of the dromos and doorway of the Prosymna Tholos

- Location within Greece
- Coordinates: 37°42′50″N 22°50′30″E
- Country: Greece
- Administrative region: Peloponnese
- Regional unit: Argolis
- Municipality: Argos-Mykines
- Municipal unit: Mykines

Population (2021)
  - Community: 495
- Time zone: UTC+2 (EET)
  - Summer (DST): UTC+3 (EEST)

Prosymna (Greek: Πρόσυμνα) is a village located in the municipal unit of Mykines, Argolis, Greece. Frank Klopas was born here. The village is a historical Arvanite settlement.
