= 1998 U.S. Open Cup =

Tournament details
- Country: United States

Final positions
- Champions: Chicago Fire (1st title)
- Runners-up: Columbus Crew

Tournament statistics
- Top goal scorer(s): Jason Acres (4 goals)

The 1998 U.S. Open Cup ran from June through October, 1998, open to all soccer teams in the United States.

The first-year Major League Soccer club Chicago Fire won the Cup with a 2–1 overtime victory over the Columbus Crew at Soldier Field in Chicago, Illinois.

In the early rounds of the tournament, only one MLS team lost to a minor-league side, when the A-League's Nashville Metros beat the Kansas City Wizards 3–1.

== Open Cup Bracket ==
Home teams listed on top of bracket

Second Round
A-L	Hershey Wildcats	2
PDL	Chicago Stingers	3
A-L	El Paso Patriots	9
PDL	Arizona Sahuaros	1
A-L	Orange County Zodiac	2
PDL	Austin Lone Stars	1
A-L	Nashville Metros	7
PDL	Delaware Wizards	1
A-L	Milwaukee Rampage	1
PDL	Orlando Nighthawks	2
PDL	Western Mass Pioneers	1
A-L	Rochester Rhinos	3
A-L	Hampton Roads Mariners (aet, PSO)	0 (3)
PDL	Central Jersey Riptide	0 (2)
A-L	Worcester Wildfire	2
PDL	Charlotte Eagles	0

Third Round
PDL	Chicago Stingers	1
MLS	Chicago Fire S.C.	3
A-L	El Paso Patriots	0
MLS	San Jose Clash	2
MLS	Dallas Burn	4
A-L	Orange County Zodiac	0
A-L	Nashville Metros	3
MLS	Kansas City Wizards	1
MLS	Miami Fusion	3
PDL	Orlando Nighthawks	0
A-L	Rochester Rhinos	1
MLS	Columbus Crew (ASDET)	2
MLS	MetroStars (ASDET)	1
A-L	Hampton Roads Mariners	0
MLS	Tampa Bay Mutiny (ASDET, PSO)	2 (5)
PDL	Worcester Wildfire	2 (4)

Quarterfinals
MLS	Chicago Fire (ASDET, PSO)	1 (4)
MLS	San Jose Clash	1 (3)
MLS	Dallas Burn	5
A-L	Nashville Metros	1
MLS	Columbus Crew	3
MLS	Miami Fusion	0
MLS	MetroStars	4
MLS	Tampa Bay Mutiny	0

Semifinals
MLS	Chicago Fire S.C.	3
MLS	Dallas Burn	2
MLS	Columbus Crew	1
MLS	MetroStars	0

Finals
MLS	Chicago Fire S.C. (ASDET)	2
MLS	Columbus Crew	1

== First round ==
Eight D3 Pro, four PDL, and four USASA teams start.

June 9, 1998	San Nicholas S.C. (USASA Region IV)	1-2	Austin Lone Stars (USISL D3-Pro)	House Park; Austin, Texas
	May 58'	(Report)	Gabe Jones 23'; Bryan Pearce 40' (pen.)	Attendance: 824

June 10, 1998	Detroit Dynamite (USISL PDSL)	1-2 (a.e.t.)	Delaware Wizards (USISL D3-Pro)	Randy White Alumni Stadium; Wilmington, Delaware
	Dan Savich 8'	(Report)	Steve Slack 85'; Sean Flanagan 99'

June 11, 1998	S.A.C. Wisla (USASA Region II)	0-8	Chicago Stingers (USISL D3-Pro)	Forest View Park; Arlington Heights, Illinois
		(Report)	Jason Acres (???), (???), (???); (???); (???); (???); (???); (???)

June 12, 1998	Los Lobos (USASA Region III)	3-4	Charlotte Eagles (USISL D3-Pro)	Davidson College; Davidson, North Carolina
	Richard Verge 52'; Shane Schwab 74'; Richard Archambeau 79'	(Report)	Jamie Wellington (???), (???), 59'; Jon Payne 52'

June 12, 1998	San Gabriel Valley Highlanders (USISL PDSL)	1-2	Arizona Sahuaros (USISL D3-Pro)	Dobson High School; Mesa, Arizona
	Sarkis Banyan 86'	(Report)	Edson Rico 20'; Don Gaillard 33'	Attendance: 5816

June 13, 1998	Kansas City Brass (USISL PDSL)	1–2 (a.e.t.)	Central Jersey Riptide (USISL D3-Pro)	Memorial Stadium; New Brunswick, New Jersey
	Sean Walker 11'	(Report)	Dave Siljanovski 1'; Andreas Maier 118' (pen.)

June 16, 1998	Jackson Chargers (USISL PDSL)	1–2	Orlando Nighthawks (USISL D3-Pro)	Frank E. Lough Stadium; Orlando, Florida
	Jeremy Shortt 21'	(Report)	Rod Levy 75'; Brian Person 87' (o.g.)	Attendance: 150

June 21, 1998	Western Massachusetts Pioneers (USISL D3-Pro)	2-0 (forfeit)	New York Greek American Atlas (USASA Region I)
		(Report)
Note: New York Greek American Atlas was forced to forfeit the match (originally a 1-0) win due to the use of six players who had not obtained international clearance.

== Second round ==
Eight A-League enter.

June 23, 1998	Charlotte Eagles (USISL D3-Pro)	0–2	Worcester Wildfire (USISL A-League)	Natick High School; Natick, Massachusetts
			Neil Ryan 13'; Tony McPeak 88'

June 23, 1998	Chicago Stingers (USISL D3-Pro)	3-2 (a.e.t.)	Hershey Wildcats (USISL A-League)	Hersheypark Stadium; Hershey, Pennsylvania
	Matt Hamnett 37'; Chris Jahr 63'; Jason Acres 99'	(Report)	Kyle Swords 18'; Danny Kelly 52'	Referee: Nate Clement

June 23, 1998	Orlando Nighthawks (USISL D3-Pro)	2–1	Milwaukee Rampage (USISL A-League)
	Robin Chan (???); Jose Marcone DeOliveira (???)	(Report)	(???)

June 23, 1998	Austin Lone Stars (USISL D3-Pro)	1–2	Orange County Zodiac (USISL A-League)	Anteater Stadium; Irvine, California
	Randy Holland 62'	(Report)	David Gilliam 18' (o.g.); Gustavo Leal 42'

June 24, 1998	Arizona Sahuaros (USISL D3-Pro)	1–9	El Paso Patriots (USISL A-League)	SISD Student Activities Complex; Socorro, Texas
				Attendance: 921

June 24, 1998	Delaware Wizards (USISL D3-Pro)	1–7	Nashville Metros (USISL A-League)	HCA Columbia Soccer Stadium; Nashville, Tennessee
	Tarik Walker 68'	(Report)	John Smith 22'; Kevin Quigley 42', 62'; Kalin Bankov 43', 76' (pen.); John Jones 52'; Martin Reynders 60'	Attendance: 469

June 30, 1998	Central Jersey Riptide (USISL D3-Pro)	0–0 (a.e.t.) (2-3 p)	Hampton Roads Mariners (USISL A-League)

July 1, 1998	Rochester Raging Rhinos (USISL A-League)	3–1	Western Massachusetts Pioneers (USISL D3-Pro)	Lusitano Stadium; Ludlow, Massachusetts
	Doug Miller 41'; Yari Allnutt (???)	(Report)	Mike Butler 62'	Attendance: 2156

== Third round ==
Eight MLS enter.

July 6, 1998	Chicago Fire (MLS)	3–1	Chicago Stingers (USISL D3-Pro)	Forest View Park Stadium; Arlington Heights, Illinois
	Frank Klopas 80'; Diego Gutierrez 83'; Josh Wolff 87'	(Report)	Joe Carver 22'	Attendance: 4216

July 7, 1998	Columbus Crew (MLS)	2-1 (a.e.t.)	Rochester Raging Rhinos (USISL A-League)	Frontier Field; Rochester, New York
	Brian McBride 13' (pen.); Todd Yeagley 103'	(Report)	Darren Tilley 60'	Attendance: 9287

July 7, 1998	San Jose Clash (MLS)	2-0	El Paso Patriots (USISL A-League)	SISD Student Activities Complex; Socorro, Texas
	John Doyle 38', 78'	(Report)		Attendance: 3275

July 8, 1998	Hampton Roads Mariners (USISL A-League)	0–1 (a.e.t.)	MetroStars (MLS)	Kean Alumni Stadium; Union, New Jersey
		(Report)	Eduardo Hurtado 98'	Attendance: 462

July 8, 1998	Orlando Nighthawks (USISL D3-Pro)	0–3	Miami Fusion F.C. (MLS)	Lockhart Stadium; Fort Lauderdale, Florida
		(Report)	Diego Serna 17'; Dan Stebbins 36', 39'

July 8, 1998	Worcester Wildfire (USISL A-League)	2-2 (a.e.t.) (4-5 p)	Tampa Bay Mutiny (MLS)	USF Soccer and Track Stadium; Tampa, Florida
	James Proctor (???); Neil Ryan (???)	(Report)	Mauricio Ramos (???); Frankie Hejduk (???)

July 8, 1998	Orange County Zodiac (USISL A-League)	0-4	Dallas Burn (MLS)	Old Panther Field; Duncanville, Texas

July 8, 1998	Kansas City Wizards (MLS)	1-3	Nashville Metros (USISL A-League)	HCA Columbia Soccer Stadium; Nashville, Tennessee
	Paul Rideout 24'	(Report)	Chris McDonald 62'; Martin Reynders 79'; John Smith 89'	Attendance: 1248

== Quarterfinals ==
July 22, 1998

Columbus Crew (MLS)	3–0	Miami Fusion (MLS)
Jeff Cunningham 12'; Brian McBride 36', 44'	(Report)

Finley Stadium
Chattanooga, Tennessee
Attendance: 3,757
Referee: Sandra Hunt (USA)

July 22, 1998

MetroStars (MLS)	4–0	Tampa Bay Mutiny (MLS)
Giovanni Savarese 33', 35'; Jim Rooney 75'; Mike Sorber 77'	(Report)

Finley Stadium
Chattanooga, Tennessee
Attendance: 3,757
Referee: Kevin Stott (USA)

July 22, 1998

Chicago Fire (MLS)	1–1 (AET) 4-3 PSO	San Jose Clash (MLS)
Lubos Kubik 55'	(Report)	Jeff Baicher 65'

Cotton Bowl
Dallas, Texas
Attendance: 3,812
Referee: Kevin Terry (USA)

July 22, 1998

Nashville Metros (A-League)	1–5	Dallas Burn (MLS)
John Jones 87'	(Report)	Dante Washington 9', 53'; Mickey Trotman 48'; Temoc Suarez 78'; Richard Farrer 81'

Cotton Bowl
Dallas, Texas
Attendance: 3,812
Referee: Gerry Corrie (USA)

== Semifinals ==
August 4, 1998

Chicago Fire (MLS)	3–2	Dallas Burn (MLS)
Ante Razov 11'; Roman Kosecki 56'; Lubos Kubik 74'	(Report)	Mickey Trotman 23'; Leonel Álvarez 83' (pen.)

Zephyr Field
New Orleans, Louisiana
Attendance: 6,514
Referee: Rich Grady (USA)

August 4, 1998

Columbus Crew (MLS)	1–0	MetroStars (MLS)
Ricardo Iribarren 5'	(Report)

Zephyr Field
New Orleans, Louisiana
Attendance: 6,514
Referee: Tim Weyland (USA)

== Final ==
October 30, 1998

Chicago Fire	2–1 (a.e.t.)	Columbus Crew
Podbrożny 45' (pen.); Klopas 99'	Report	John 53'

Soldier Field, Chicago, Illinois
Attendance: 18,615
Referee: Arturo Angeles

Chicago Fire	Columbus Crew

== Top scorers ==
Position	Player	Club	Goals
1	Jason Acres	Chicago Stingers	4
2	Kirk Wilson	El Paso Patriots	3
	Brian McBride	Columbus Crew	3
	Joe Carver	Chicago Stingers	3
	James Wellington	Charlotte Eagles	3

== See also ==
- United States Soccer Federation
- U.S. Open Cup
- Major League Soccer
- United Soccer Leagues
- USASA
- National Premier Soccer League
- 1998 National Amateur Cup
