= Martin Reijnders =

Dutch footballer (born 1972)

Personal information
- Date of birth: 11 April 1972 (age 54)
- Place of birth: Zwolle, Netherlands
- Height: 1.80 m (5 ft 11 in)
- Position: Forward

Youth career
- 1989–1990: PEC Zwolle

Senior career*
Years	Team	Apps	(Gls)
1990–1998	PEC Zwolle	182	(31)
1998	Nashville Metros	21	(11)
1998	Jokerit	10	(3)
1999	Haka	14	(4)
1999–2000	Den Bosch	4	(0)
2000	Haka	24	(7)
2001–2002	Veendam	14	(4)
2006–2008	PEC Zwolle	4	(0)
Total		273	(60)

Managerial career
- 2006–2008: PEC Zwolle (assistant)
- * Club domestic league appearances and goals

Martin Reijnders (born 11 April 1972) is a Dutch former professional footballer who played as a forward.

== Career ==
Reijnders began his career with PEC Zwolle, graduating from the club's U19 team to the first team in 1990. He remained with Zwolle until 1998 when he moved to the United States and signed with the Nashville Metros of the USISL A-League. In November 1998, Reijnders returned to Europe where he joined Jokerit in the Finnish Veikkausliiga. In 1999, he moved to Haka, also in Finland. In 2000, Reijnders joined Den Bosch. He played for Veendam in the 2001–02 season, before retiring from professional football. He later played a handful of games for PEC Zwolle while working as an assistant manager from 2006 to 2008.

== Personal life ==
Reijnders is married to Angelina Lekatompessy, who is of Moluccan descent. They have three children: sons Tijjani and Eliano, who are also professional footballers, and a daughter.
