= Francis Okaroh =

Nigerian footballer

Personal information
- Date of birth: August 25, 1963 (age 63)
- Place of birth: Enugu, Nigeria
- Height: 6 ft 0 in (1.83 m)
- Position: Defender

Youth career
- 1982–1986: Boston University Terriers

Senior career*
Years	Team	Apps	(Gls)
1987–1988	Cleveland Force (indoor)	13	(0)
- Menem
1995	Lowell Blues		
1995	Boston Storm		
1996	Cape Cod Crusaders		
1996–1997	New England Revolution	49	(0)
1998–1999	Chicago Fire	52	(0)
2000	Miami Fusion	13	(0)

Managerial career
- 2007–: Boston University
- * Club domestic league appearances and goals

Francis Okaroh // (born August 25, 1963 in Enugu, Nigeria) is a retired Nigerian football (soccer) defender. Playing professionally in the United States, he began his career indoors with the Cleveland Force in 1987–88 before spending five seasons in Major League Soccer (MLS) with the New England Revolution (1996–1997), Chicago Fire (1998–1999) and Miami Fusion (2000). He was a starting defender in the inaugural campaigns for both the Revolution and Fire, winning MLS Cup '98 with the latter. He has been an assistant coach with the men's soccer program at his alma mater Boston University since 2007.

== Player ==
=== College ===
Okaroh played college soccer in the United States at Boston University (BU) from 1982 to 1986. He was a 1986 Second Team All American. He was inducted into the BU Athletic Hall of Fame in 2006.

=== Professional ===
In November 1987, Okaroh signed with the Cleveland Force of Major Indoor Soccer League. He played only one season with the Force. In 1995, Okaroh played for the amateur Lowell Blues of the Luso-American Soccer Association.

==== Major League Soccer ====
In 1996, in preparation for the upcoming Major League Soccer season, Okaroh signed with the Cape Cod Crusaders of the USISL. Okaroh was signed by Major League Soccer's New England Revolution on July 22, 1996. He made his Revolution debut on June 23 in a 4-1 loss to the Dallas Burn. Okaroh was a stand-out player and a fixture on the Revolution backline during his time with the club. Nicknamed "The General," Okaroh started twenty matches in the Revolution's inaugural campaign, despite joining mid-way through the season. He was named team defender of the year for the 1996 New England Revolution season (then known as the "Bic Tough Defensive Player of the Year" for sponsorship reasons). In 1997, Okaroh helped the club qualify for the playoffs for the first time in their history, making 29 starts during the regular season, and again being named Revolution Defender of the Year.

On November 4, 1997, Okaroh was taken by the Chicago Fire in the seventh round of the 1997 MLS Expansion Draft. He then helped the Fire to the 1998 MLS Cup and 1998 U.S. Open Cup double, making 33 appearances across all competitions.

On March 10, 2000, he was traded to the Miami Fusion for Fusion's 2001 second round MLS SuperDraft selection and a conditional draft pick. He made 13 appearances in his sole season with the Fusion before being traded to the MetroStars. He never played for the latter club, and was waived before the 2001 season.

Okaroh made 114 appearances during his MLS career, and never scored a goal. That run ranked him 7th all-time in MLS appearances without recording a goal as of 2009.

== Coach ==
In the early 1990s, Okaroh coached the Norwood High School boys' soccer team. Currently, he runs Francis Okaroh's Ultimate Soccer Academy in New Hampton, New Hampshire. In 2007, he became an assistant coach with the Boston University men's soccer team. With his brother Ben, he founded FC Blazers, a youth soccer club based in Massachusetts.

Francis Okaroh joined the Emmanuel College staff as the Head Women's Soccer Coach, taking over the program in April 2021, leaving after the 2025 season. In his first two seasons with the team, Okaroh led the Saints to a pair of GNAC postseason berths and was named the 2022 GNAC Women's Soccer Coach of the Year. He coached the 2022 GNAC Rookie of the Year, the 2022 GNAC Goalkeeper of the Year and the 2021 GNAC Defensive Player of the Year while having eight members honored on the GNAC All-Conference squad.
