= Roman Kosecki =

Polish footballer (born 1966)

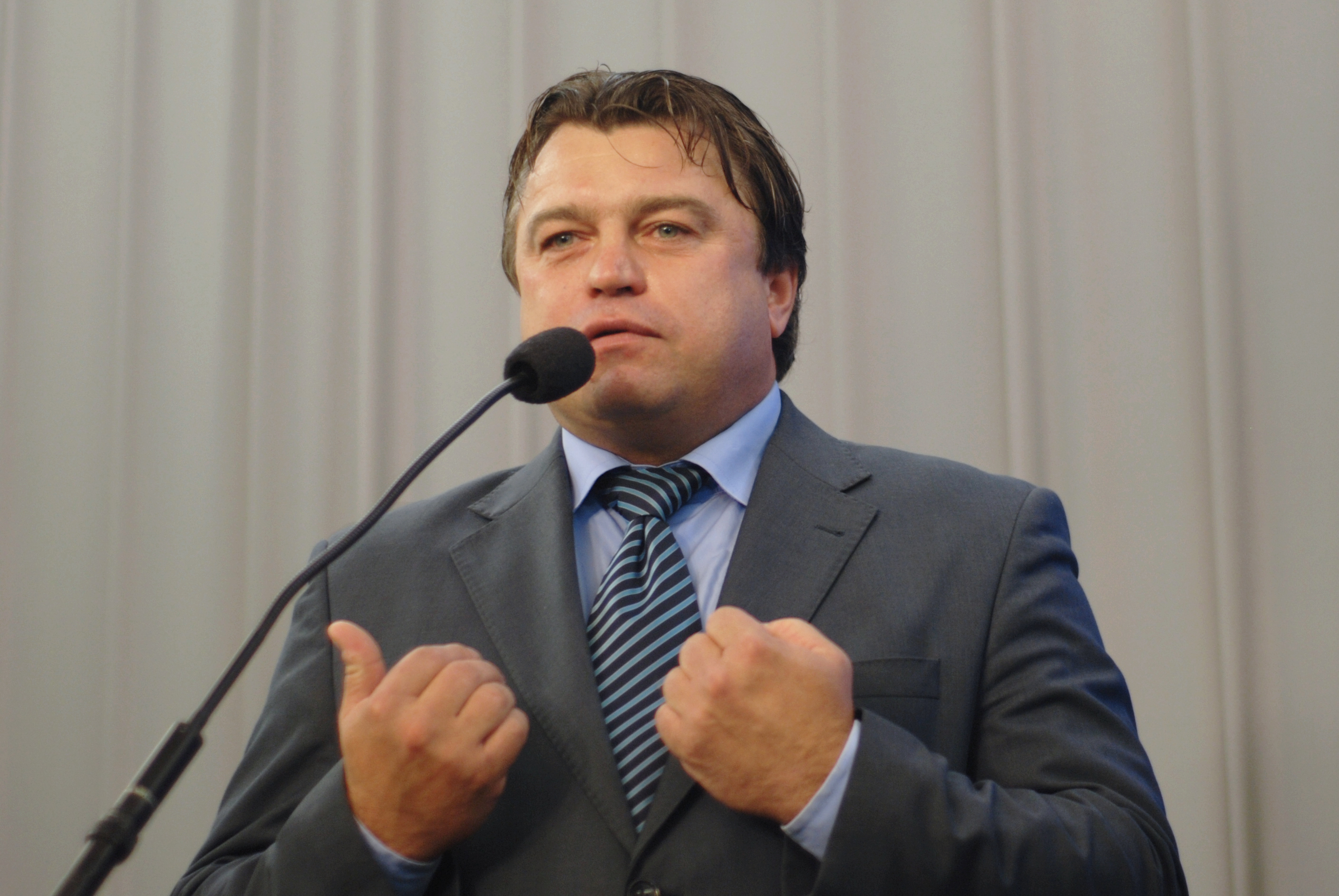
- Kosecki in 2011

Personal information
- Date of birth: 15 February 1966 (age 60)
- Place of birth: Piaseczno, Poland
- Height: 1.72 m (5 ft 8 in)
- Position: Forward

Senior career*
| Years | Team | Apps | (Gls) |
| 1982–1983 | RKS Mirków | | |
| 1983–1986 | RKS Ursus | | |
| 1986–1988 | Gwardia Warsaw | 60 | (18) |
| 1988–1990 | Legia Warsaw | 51 | (12) |
| 1990–1992 | Galatasaray | 38 | (19) |
| 1992–1993 | Osasuna | 34 | (8) |
| 1993–1995 | Atlético Madrid | 59 | (14) |
| 1995–1996 | FC Nantes | 27 | (2) |
| 1996–1997 | Montpellier | 19 | (2) |
| 1997–1998 | Legia Warsaw | 10 | (0) |
| 1998–1999 | Chicago Fire | 50 | (12) |

International career
- Poland U18
| 1988–1995 | Poland | 69 | (19) |
Medal record
Men's football
Representing Poland
UEFA European Under-18 Championship
| Third place | 1984 Soviet Union |
- * Club domestic league appearances and goals

Roman Jacek Kosecki (born 15 February 1966) is a Polish former professional footballer who played as a striker. In 1994, he was voted the Polish Footballer of the Year.

== Career ==
In his club career, Kosecki played for RKS URSUS, Gwardia Warsaw, Legia Warsaw, Galatasaray, CA Osasuna, Atlético Madrid, Nantes, Montpellier, and the Chicago Fire. Osasuna transferred Kosecki to Atlético Madrid after the 1992–93 La Liga season, the second most expensive transfer of a foreign player in that window. After a successful year with Atlético Madrid and the Poland national team, Kosecki was chosen as the 1994 Polish footballer of the year by Piłka Nożna magazine. He came to Major League Soccer in the Fire's inaugural season in 1998, joining fellow Polish internationals Peter Nowak and Jerzy Podbrozny. Kosecki proceeded to score the first goal in Fire's history in a 2–0 win over the Miami Fusion. He then helped the club to the MLS Cup and U.S. Open Cup double. Kosecki played two seasons in MLS, scoring 12 goals and 19 assists in league play, before retiring as a player.

For Poland, Kosecki was capped 69 times, scoring 19 goals between 1988 and 1995.

He was a deputy (poseł) to the Polish Sejm from Civic Platform in 2005. Kosecki ran for the position of president of the PZPN in 2012 but lost to Polish soccer legend Zbigniew Boniek. Boniek however appointed him to vice president of youth development.

== Personal life ==
His son Jakub Kosecki is also a professional football player.

== Career statistics ==
=== International ===
Appearances and goals by national team and year
| National team | Year | Apps | Goals |
|---|---|---|---|
| Poland | 1988 | 7 | 3 |
| Poland | 1989 | 13 | 2 |
| Poland | 1990 | 15 | 5 |
| Poland | 1991 | 9 | 1 |
| Poland | 1992 | 6 | 4 |
| Poland | 1993 | 7 | 0 |
| Poland | 1994 | 5 | 2 |
| Poland | 1995 | 7 | 2 |
| Total | | 69 | 19 |

Scores and results list Poland's goal tally first, score column indicates score after each Kosecki goal.

List of international goals scored by Roman Kosecki
| No. | Date | Venue | Opponent | Score | Result | Competition |
|---|---|---|---|---|---|---|
| 1 | 10 February 1988 | Ramat Gan Stadium, Tel Aviv, Israel | Israel | 3–1 | 3–1 | Friendly |
| 2 | 13 July 1988 | Veterans Stadium, New Britain, United States | United States | 1–0 | 2–0 | Friendly |
| 3 | 13 July 1988 | Veterans Stadium, New Britain, United States | United States | 2–0 | 2–0 | Friendly |
| 4 | 8 February 1989 | Costa Rica National Stadium, San José, Costarica | Costa Rica | 2–1 | 4–2 | Friendly |
| 5 | 14 February 1989 | Estadio Cuauhtémoc, Puebla City, Puebla, Mexico | Mexico | 1–3 | 1–3 | Friendly |
| 6 | 11 February 1990 | Helmy Zamora Stadium, Cairo, Egypt | Kuwait | 1–0 | 1–1 | Friendly |
| 7 | 4 May 1990 | Comiskey Park, Chicago, United States | Colombia | 1–2 | 1–2 | Friendly |
| 8 | 21 May 1990 | Stade Vélodrome, Marseille, France | United Arab Emirates | 3–0 | 4–0 | Friendly |
| 9 | 10 October 1990 | Polish Army Stadium, Warsaw, Poland | United States | 1–3 | 2–3 | Friendly |
| 10 | 19 December 1990 | Volos Municipal Stadium, Volos, Greece | Greece | 2–1 | 2–1 | Friendly |
| 11 | 17 April 1991 | Polish Army Stadium, Warsaw, Poland | Turkey | 3–0 | 3–0 | UEFA Euro 1992 qualifying |
| 12 | 19 May 1992 | Stadion Lehen, Salzburg, Austria | Austria | 1–0 | 4–2 | Friendly |
| 13 | 19 May 1992 | Stadion Lehen, Salzburg, Austria | Austria | 2–1 | 4–2 | Friendly |
| 14 | 5 July 1992 | Doroteo Guamuch Flores Stadium, Guatemala City, Guatemala | Guatemala | 1–0 | 2–2 | Friendly |
| 15 | 5 July 1992 | Doroteo Guamuch Flores Stadium, Guatemala City, Guatemala | Guatemala | 2–1 | 2–2 | Friendly |
| 16 | 9 February 1994 | Estadio Heliodoro Rodríguez López, Santa Cruz de Tenerife, Spain | Spain | 1–1 | 1–1 | Friendly |
| 17 | 4 September 1994 | Ramat Gan Stadium, Tel Aviv, Israel | Israel | 1–2 | 1–2 | UEFA Euro 1996 qualifying |
| 18 | 25 April 1995 | Arena Zabrze, Zabrze, Poland | Israel | 4–2 | 4–3 | UEFA Euro 1996 qualifying |
| 19 | 7 June 1995 | Arena Zabrze, Zabrze, Poland | Slovakia | 5–0 | 5–0 | UEFA Euro 1996 qualifying |

== Honours ==
Legia Warsaw

- Polish Cup: 1988–89, 1989–90
- Polish Super Cup: 1990

Galatasaray

- Turkish Cup: 1990–91
- Turkish Super Cup: 1991

Chicago Fire

- MLS Cup: 1998
- U.S. Open Cup: 1998

Poland U18

- UEFA European Under-18 Championship third place: 1984

Individual

- Polish Newcomer of the Year: 1988
- Piłka Nożna Polish Footballer of the Year: 1994
- MLS All-Star: 1999
