= Roy Lassiter =

American soccer player (born 1969)

Personal information
- Full name: Roy Lee Lassiter
- Date of birth: March 9, 1969 (age 57)
- Place of birth: Washington, D.C., United States
- Height: 5 ft 10 in (1.78 m)
- Position: Forward

Youth career
- 1985–1988: Athens Drive
- 1989: Raleigh United
- 1989: Lees-McRae College
- 1990–1992: NC State Wolfpack

Senior career*
Years	Team	Apps	(Gls)
1992–1993	Turrialba	25	(1)
1993–1994	Carmelita	30	(7)
1994–1996	Alajuelense	43	(17)
1996–1998	Tampa Bay Mutiny	60	(37)
1996–1997	→ Genoa (loan)	12	(0)
1998–1999	D.C. United	55	(36)
2000	Miami Fusion	27	(8)
2001–2002	Kansas City Wizards	25	(7)
2002	D.C. United	12	(0)
2003	Virginia Beach Mariners	25	(7)
2004	Laredo Heat	1	(0)
Total		315	(120)

International career
1992–2000	United States	34	(4)

Managerial career
- 2017: Kitsap Soccer Club
- 2022–2023: Houston Dynamo 2 (assistant)
- 2024: Carolina Core FC
- 2026–: Denton Diablos FC
Medal record
Representing United States
Runner-up	CONCACAF Gold Cup	1998
Third place	CONCACAF Gold Cup	1996
Men's Soccer
- * Club domestic league appearances and goals

Roy Lee Lassiter (born March 9, 1969) is an American former professional soccer player and head coach of Denton Diablos FC in USL League Two.

Lassiter played as a forward, spending the first four years of his professional career in Costa Rica. He returned to the United States to play for the Tampa Bay Mutiny in Major League Soccer (MLS) when the league was launched in 1996, winning the inaugural MLS Golden Boot with 27 goals. Lassiter played eight seasons in MLS, followed by a single season each in the USL A-League and Premier Development League, before retiring in 2004.

Lassiter began his managerial career in 2017 as the head coach of National Premier Soccer League side Kitsap Soccer Club. He served as the assistant coach of MLS Next Pro club Houston Dynamo 2 from 2022 to 2023 before leading Carolina Core FC in 2024. On March 5, 2026, he was announced as the head coach of the Denton Diablos.

He is the father of Ariel Lassiter, who plays for Portland Timbers of MLS.

== Early life and education ==
Lassiter was born in Washington, D.C., but grew up in Raleigh, North Carolina where he attended Athens Drive High School. He was the NCHSAA 4A State Player of the Year as a senior and a high school All-American. That year, he led his high school soccer team to the state championship while scoring a state record 47 goals. He also played for a local youth club, the Raleigh Rockets.

Lassiter attended and played soccer at Lees-McRae College before transferring to North Carolina State University, where he was a 1991 First-Team All-ACC and All South.

== Club career ==
While convalescing, Lassiter was contacted by Turrialba from Costa Rica in 1992. As Lassiter recalls it, "I have no idea how they got my name. They paid for my trip down there while still recovering from my leg injury, and I signed a contract." He also played for Carmelita and in summer 1995, Alajuelense sold him to Major League Soccer. In August 1995, Lassiter was arrested in connection with two burglaries that took place in 1992 after a Raleigh police detective read a newspaper article that mentioned a goal Lassiter scored in a U.S. friendly match with Benfica. Lassiter was sentenced to 30 days in jail.

In 1996, Lassiter won the top goalscorer award in Major League Soccer, scoring 27 goals for Tampa Bay Mutiny, after when he was loaned for 6 months to Italian Serie B side Genoa. His record in the league's inaugural season was tied several times, but stood until it was broken in 2018 by Josef Martínez of Atlanta United FC.

Lassiter was traded to D.C. United in 1998 for Roy Wegerle. He played two seasons in DC, winning the MLS Cup in 1999. Lassiter was traded to the Miami Fusion in 2000 due to salary cap, as Lassiter sought a significant pay raise yet D.C. United were near their salary cap limit. He was then traded to the Kansas City Wizards in 2001, and back to DC in the middle of the 2002 season. He ended his MLS career with 88 regular season goals, a record surpassed in 2004 by Jason Kreis. Lassiter added 13 goals in MLS playoffs and is 3rd in that category behind Carlos Ruiz and Landon Donovan.

He ended his professional career with A-League's Virginia Beach Mariners in 2003 as player/assistant coach, but played a few games with Laredo Heat of the Premier Development League and the exhibition Austin Posse in 2004 to help promote their clubs.

== International career ==
Lassiter was called up to the U.S. national team in January 1992. He earned his first cap as a substitute for Eric Wynalda in a 1–0 loss to the Commonwealth of Independent States in Miami. However, he broke his leg in a training ground collision with Bruce Murray a few days later. His second cap with the national team came over three years later as a substitute for Frank Klopas in an August 16, 1995 1–0 loss to Sweden in Norrköping. On October 8, 1995, he played a third time for the national team, again as a substitute, scoring the game-winning goal in a 4–3 victory over Saudi Arabia. Lassiter's career continued to rise, and he earned his first start for the national team in December 1996 and became a regular for much of 1997. While Lassiter played consistently for the U.S. in 1997, his appearances tapered off in 1998 and he was selected as an alternate for the 1998 FIFA World Cup roster. He played only one game in 2000, his last with the national team. He represented his country in four FIFA World Cup qualification matches and finished his international career with 34 caps and 4 goals.

== Career statistics ==
Scores and results list the United States' goal tally first, score column indicates score after each Lassiter goal.

List of international goals scored by Roy Lassiter
No.	Date	Venue	Opponent	Score	Result	Competition
1	October 8, 1995	Washington, D.C., United States	Saudi Arabia	4–3	4–3	Friendly
2	December 14, 1996	Palo Alto, California, United States	Costa Rica	2–0	2-1	1998 FIFA World Cup qualification
3	March 23, 1997	San José, Costa Rica	Costa Rica	2–2	2–3	1998 FIFA World Cup qualification
4	June 29, 1997	San Salvador, El Salvador	El Salvador	1–0	1–1	1998 FIFA World Cup qualification

== Coaching statistics ==
As of October, 2023

Team	From	To	Record				
Team	From	To	G	W	D	L	Win %
Carolina Core FC	June 15, 2023	Present	0	0	0	0	—

== Honors ==
Alajuelense

- Costa Rican Championship: 1995–96

Tampa Bay Mutiny

- MLS Supporters' Shield: 1996

D.C. United

- MLS Cup: 1999; runner-up 1998
- MLS Supporters' Shield: 1999
- CONCACAF Champions League: 1998
- Copa Interamericana: 1998

Individual

- MLS All-Star: 1996, 1998, 1999
- MLS Golden Boot: 1996 (with Tampa Bay Mutiny)
- MLS Best XI: 1996 (with Tampa Bay Mutiny)
- CONCACAF Champions League MVP: 1998 (with D.C. United)
