= Ritchie Kotschau =

American former soccer player (born 1975)

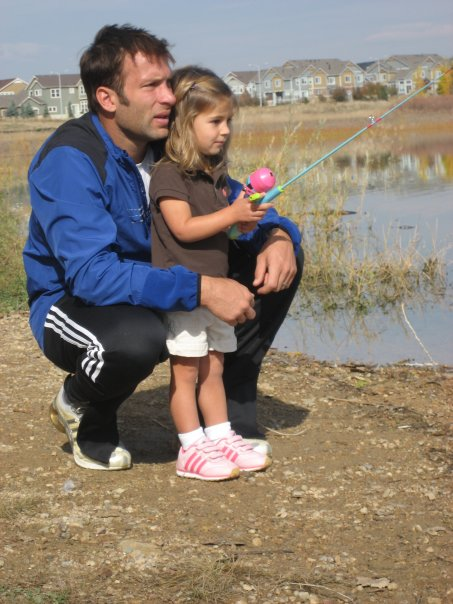
- Kotschau with daughter

Personal information
- Full name: Richard Scott Kotschau
- Date of birth: November 22, 1975 (age 50)
- Place of birth: Levittown, New York, United States
- Height: 1.78 m (5 ft 10 in)
- Position: Defender

Youth career
- 1994–1997: George Mason Patriots

Senior career*
Years	Team	Apps	(Gls)
1998–1999	Chicago Fire	28	(4)
1999–2001	Tampa Bay Mutiny	58	(4)
2001–2005	Colorado Rapids	126	(2)
2006	Columbus Crew	26	(1)
2007–2008	Real Salt Lake	3	(0)
Total		241	(11)

International career
2005	United States	1	(0)
- * Club domestic league appearances and goals

Richard Scott Kotschau (born November 22, 1975) is an American former soccer player who last played as a defender for the Real Salt Lake of Major League Soccer.

== Club career ==
Kotschau was born in Levittown, New York. After playing college soccer at George Mason University, where he helped his team to their first-ever NCAA Tournament appearance, Kotschau was drafted by the Chicago Fire second overall in the 1998 MLS College Draft. Although he helped the Fire to the MLS Cup and US Open Cup double in his rookie year he was traded to the Tampa Bay Mutiny midway through the 1999 season.

Midway through 2001, Kotschau was part of the deal that sent Carlos Valderrama to the Colorado Rapids. With Colorado, Ritchie was a first-choice player, played a number of defensive roles, and scored his first MLS goal. After the 2005 season, he was dealt to the Crew for Cornell Glen. While with the Columbus Crew defender Ritchie Kotschau was named the Huntington man of the year by the Columbus Crew. The award is presented to the player who embodies an exceptional sense of leadership, civic pride, family values and community service. Kotschau, 30, in his first season with the Crew, appeared in 26 games, starting 23. The nine-year MLS veteran wore the captain's armband 17 times this season and recorded one goal and two assists. That goal was a game-winner. In ten years in MLS, Kotschau scored nine regular season goals and added 15 assists.

== International career ==
Kotschau earned his first cap for the United States national team on March 9, 2005, against Colombia and was a former member of the U-23, U-20, B and U-18 teams.

== Personal life ==
Kotschau now lives in Broomfield, Colorado where he is employed by Life Time Fitness as the Member Engagement Manager. Kotschau is married with two children.
