= Josh Keller =

American soccer player

Personal information
- Date of birth: February 16, 1975 (age 51)
- Place of birth: Laguna Niguel, California, United States
- Height: 5 ft 10 in (1.78 m)
- Position: Midfielder

College career
Years	Team	Apps	(Gls)
1993–1997	UCLA Bruins		

Senior career*
Years	Team	Apps	(Gls)
1998	Tampa Bay Mutiny	9	(0)
1998	→ Charleston Battery (loan)	4	(0)
1998	Chicago Fire	6	(0)
1998	→ MLS Pro 40 (loan)	7	(1)
1999–2001	Tampa Bay Mutiny	74	(5)
1999	→ MLS Pro 40 (loan)	6	(0)
- * Club domestic league appearances and goals

Josh Keller (born February 16, 1975, in Laguna Niguel, California) is a retired American soccer midfielder who spent four seasons in Major League Soccer.

Keller attended UCLA, playing on the men's soccer team from 1994 to 1997. In 1997, he was captain of the team when it won the NCAA Men's Soccer Championship. He graduated cum laude with a bachelor's degree in psychology and business. In March 1998, the Tampa Bay Mutiny selected Keller in the first round (seventh overall) in the 1998 MLS College Draft. He played nine games for the Mutiny in 1998 before being traded to the Chicago Fire on June 29, 1998, in exchange for Jorge Salcedo. He played six games for the Fire that season. He also went on loan with the Charleston Battery of the USL A-League for four games. On March 17, 1999, the Fire traded Keller back to the Mutiny. When the Mutiny folded in 2001, the Dallas Burn selected Keller in the first round of the 2002 MLS Dispersal Draft. He elected to retire from professional soccer and joined Morgan Stanley, a financial services company. He later moved to Booz Allen Hamilton, a consulting firm. In January 2005, Keller moved to Proactive Sports Management, where he is currently the director of marketing.
