= C. J. Brown =

American soccer player (born 1975)

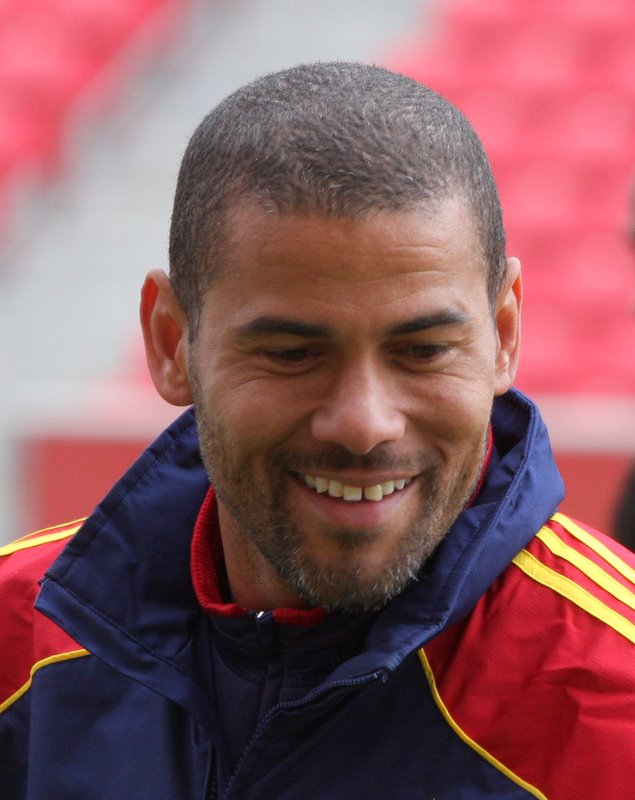
- Brown in 2011

Personal information
- Full name: Charles James Brown
- Date of birth: June 15, 1975 (age 51)
- Place of birth: Eugene, Oregon, U.S.
- Height: 6 ft 1 in (1.85 m)
- Position: Center back

Youth career
- 1993–1996: San Jose State Spartans

Senior career*
Years	Team	Apps	(Gls)
1993	Santa Cruz Surf	?	(?)
1995–1997	San Francisco Bay Seals	47	(0)
1998–2010	Chicago Fire	296	(3)
Total		343	(3)

International career^{‡}
1998–2003	United States	15	(0)

Managerial career
- 2011–2013: Real Salt Lake (assistant)
- 2014: Chicago Fire (assistant)
- 2015: New York City (assistant)
- 2016–2018: Orlando City (assistant)
- 2018–2020: New York Red Bulls (assistant)
- 2021: Chicago House
- 2021–2022: United States U23 (assistant)
- 2022–2023: Chicago Fire (assistant)
- * Club domestic league appearances and goals as of December 21, 2012 ‡ National team caps and goals as of January 18, 2010

C. J. Brown (born June 15, 1975) is an American soccer coach and former player.

== Early life ==
Brown was born Charles James Brown in Eugene, Oregon. He is of African American descent.

== College career ==
Brown played college soccer at San Jose State University for four years. He finished with 11 points (5 goals and 1 assist) and was named a two-time All-Conference Player in 1995 and 1996. Out of college, Brown was ignored by MLS, and instead joined the USISL's San Francisco Bay Seals between 1995 and 1997.

For the first two years, Brown played as an amateur while the Bay Seals played in USISL Premier League and he was still playing at San Jose. In 1997, the Bay Seals played in the USISL D-3 Pro League and made an improbable run to the U.S. Open Cup semifinals in 1997. His performances made Major League Soccer clubs take notice.

== Club career ==
Brown was drafted first overall in the 1998 MLS Supplemental Draft by Chicago. He immediately stepped into the Fire's starting lineup and continued there until his retirement at the end of the 2010 season.

In his ten years and beyond in the league, Brown has played in 249 regular season games, first in team history. He has also appeared in 32 playoff games, helping the Fire to the MLS Cup in 1998. Brown has scored four MLS goals in his career (three in the regular season and one in the playoffs). He won the U.S. Open Cup in 1998, 2000, 2003, and 2006.

On October 21, 2010, Brown announced he would retire following the Fire's season finale two days later at Chivas USA which the team went on to win 4–1. Brown retired as the club's last remaining "Fire Original", and the all-time leader in competitive appearances (372), starts (364) and minutes (32,538). Brown sits behind only Jaime Moreno (415) and Cobi Jones (392) for most competitive appearances for one MLS team.

He also won the Chicago Fire/USSF Humanitarian of the Year from 2001 through 2003 for his efforts in his community.

On May 9, 2012, Brown was inducted into the Chicago Fire's Hall of Fame.

== International career ==
After emerging from soccer obscurity, Brown amassed 15 caps with the United States national team, his first coming on November 6, 1998, against Australia. He played in the US's third-place finish at the 1999 FIFA Confederations Cup, when he was involved in one of the biggest surprises for the U.S. during the tournament, playing 90 min. on July 2 vs. Germany, in the U.S.'s 2–0 win. He also appeared in two games for the U.S. in the 2000 Gold Cup, playing 18 min. as a second-half sub on February 16 vs. Peru – a 1–0 win – and on February 2, as the Americans downed Haiti 3–0, he also participated in the Olympic Festival in 1994 and 1995.

== Coaching career ==
On January 18, 2010, Brown was hired as an assistant head coach for Real Salt Lake. He would assume the vacancy left by Robin Fraser, who left the club to coach Chivas USA. On December 11, 2013, Brown was named assistant coach of the Chicago Fire, where he won an MLS Cup as a player in 1998. After almost a year he moved to expansion club New York City FC on December 1, 2014, rejoining Jason Kreis, who he had worked under at Real Salt Lake.

On November 2, 2015, New York City FC, disappointed with not making the 2015 MLS Cup Playoffs, announced they had parted ways with Head Coach Jason Kreis as well as Brown and assistant Miles Joseph after just one year of management and would be looking for a new head coach for the following season.

On July 10, 2018, the New York Red Bulls announced that Brown would be joining newly appointed head coach Chris Armas' staff as an assistant.

On February 2, 2021, Brown was announced as the first technical director and head coach for Chicago House AC, a new professional soccer team in the National Independent Soccer Association. Later that year on March 11, Brown was announced as an assist coach for the United States men's national under-23 soccer team ahead of the 2020 CONCACAF Men's Olympic Qualifying Championship.

Brown rejoined the Fire on December 20, 2021, as a member of head coach Ezra Hendrickson's coaching staff. In January 2024 Brown left the Fire coaching staff for a new grassroots role with the club.

== Personal life ==
Brown married wife Kim on October 22, 2000, the day after winning the 2000 U.S. Open Cup Championship. The couple welcomed their first daughter, Canessa Brown on February 24, 2004. Their second daughter, Kali Brown was born exactly one year later, on February 24, 2005.

== Career statistics ==
Statistics accurate as of January 5, 2014.

Club performance			League		Playoffs		Open Cup		Continental		Total	
Season	Club	League	Apps	Goals	Apps	Goals	Apps	Goals	Apps	Goals	Apps	Goals
USA			Regular season		Playoffs		U.S. Open Cup		CONCACAF/SuperLiga		Total	
1998	Chicago Fire	Major League Soccer	28	2	5	0	4	0	–		37	2
1999	Chicago Fire	Major League Soccer	26	0	3	0	0	0	3	0	32	0
2000	Chicago Fire	Major League Soccer	27	0	7	1	5	0	–		39	1
2001	Chicago Fire	Major League Soccer	22	0	6	0	3	0	–		31	0
2002	Chicago Fire	Major League Soccer	24	0	3	0	1	0	3	0	31	0
2003	Chicago Fire	Major League Soccer	21	0	0	0	1	0	–		22	0
2004	Chicago Fire	Major League Soccer	24	0	0	0	4	0	4	0	32	0
2005	Chicago Fire	Major League Soccer	20	0	3	0	2	1	–		25	1
2006	Chicago Fire	Major League Soccer	28	1	2	0	3	0	–		33	1
2007	Chicago Fire	Major League Soccer	29	0	3	0	1	0	–		33	0
2008	Chicago Fire	Major League Soccer	3	0	0	0	1	0	–		4	0
2009	Chicago Fire	Major League Soccer	18	0	3	0	0	0	4	0	25	0
2010	Chicago Fire	Major League Soccer	26	0	0	0	0	0	2	0	28	0
Total	USA		296	3	35	1	25	1	16	0	372	5
Career total			296	3	35	1	25	1	16	0	372	5

== Honors ==
Chicago Fire

- MLS Cup: 1998; Runners-up: 2000, 2003
- Supporters' Shield: 2003
- U.S. Open Cup: 1998, 2000, 2003, 2006; Runners-up: 2004

United States

- FIFA Confederations Cup Third Place: 1999

Individual

- USISL Pacific Division Rookie of the Year: 1993
- Chicago Fire Defender of the Year: 2006, 2010
- Chicago Fire Humanitarian of the Year: 2001, 2002, 2003

Sporting positions
Preceded by Cuauhtémoc Blanco	Chicago Fire captain 2009	Succeeded by Brian McBride
