= Kevin Terry =

English-American soccer player and referee

Personal information
- Date of birth: July 3, 1958 (age 68)
- Place of birth: London, England
- Position: Forward

Senior career*
Years	Team	Apps	(Gls)
1979–1982	Cleveland Force (indoor)	85	(12)
1981	Cleveland Cobras		
1984	Oklahoma City Stampede		
- * Club domestic league appearances and goals

Kevin Terry is a retired English-American soccer forward and referee who played professionally in the Major Indoor Soccer League, American Soccer League and United Soccer League. He spent ten seasons as a Major League Soccer and seven years as a FIFA official.

== Player ==
Born in England, Terry moved to the United States when he was fifteen. In 1979, he signed with the Cleveland Force of the Major Indoor Soccer League. He played three seasons with the Force. He later played for the Cleveland Cobras of the American Soccer League and the Oklahoma City Stampede of the United Soccer League.

== Referee ==
In 1986, he became a referee with the Major Indoor Soccer League. In 1996, Terry became a referee with Major League Soccer. Before retiring in 2005, he had officiated the 1998 and 2002 MLS Cup. He also served as a FIFA referee from 1998 to 2004. In 2002, he was named the MLS Referee of the Year.
