= Diego Gutiérrez (soccer, born 1972) =

Professional soccer player

Personal information
- Full name: Diego Gutiérrez
- Date of birth: November 3, 1972 (age 53)
- Place of birth: Bogotá, Colombia
- Height: 1.70 m (5 ft 7 in)
- Position: Midfielder

College career
Years	Team	Apps	(Gls)
1992–1993	Evansville		
1994–1995	Rockhurst		

Senior career*
Years	Team	Apps	(Gls)
1996–1997	Kansas City Wizards	33	(0)
1998–2001	Chicago Fire	109	(7)
1998	→ MLS Pro-40 (loan)	2	(0)
2002–2005	Kansas City Wizards	101	(4)
2006–2008	Chicago Fire	51	(1)

International career
2001	United States	1	(0)
- * Club domestic league appearances and goals

Diego Gutiérrez (born November 3, 1972) is a former professional soccer player, who spent his career between Chicago Fire and Kansas City Wizards, both of Major League Soccer, and is currently a radio commentator for ESPN Deportes Kansas City. Born in Colombia, he played for the United States national team.

== Early life and education ==
Born in Colombia, Gutiérrez was part of the country's youth teams. He came to the United States to attend the University of Evansville and Rockhurst University. He was a 1994 First Team NAIA All American at Rockhurst.

== Club career ==
The then-Kansas City Wiz selected Gutiérrez in the second round of the 1996 MLS College Draft. Gutiérrez spent two seasons in Kansas City, but missed all of 1997 with an ACL injury.

Gutiérrez was one of the pioneer players in MLS, playing over 400 professional games. Gutiérrez's career took off after he was taken by the Chicago Fire in the 1997 MLS Expansion Draft. He helped the expansion club to the 1998 MLS Cup and US Open Cup double, scoring his first goal as a professional in the 2-0 MLS Cup win over D.C. United. Usually a left back, but equally adapts at both defense and midfield, he spent four seasons in Chicago, winning a second Open Cup in 2000. Prior to the 2002 season, Gutiérrez was re-acquired by Kansas City, winning his third Open Cup in 2004. After the 2005 season, he was traded back to Chicago for Will John and a draft pick. In his MLS career, Gutiérrez has scored ten regular season goals and 39 assists, adding that MLS Cup goal and two assists in the playoffs. With the season-ending injury of former Fire defender Jim Curtin, the versatile professional filled in as a defender, joining fellow "Fire Original" C.J. Brown on the backline. In his new defending role, Gutierrez recorded an assist in the October 6 match against the New England Revolution, ranking him fourth overall in Fire career assists leaders with 30 assists through six seasons. Gutierrez appeared in 23 league matches for Chicago through the 2007 season, starting in 22. Gutiérrez ranks among career leaders for total games played, playoff games played and assists.

On February 4, 2008, Gutierrez, the 2007 U.S. Soccer Federation/MLS Humanitarian of the Year, announced that the 2008 season would be the last of his professional playing career.

== International career ==
Gutiérrez became a United States citizen in 2000, and received one cap with the U.S. national team, coming on December 9, 2001, against South Korea. He represented the United States at the international level, as a member of the U.S. National Team from 2001 through 2005.

== Off field activity ==
He was asked to be the keynote speaker at his own citizenship ceremony, on July 4, 2000. He was invited to the join President George W. Bush and First Lady Laura Bush at the White House on April 25, 2007, for World Malaria Day, and he was invited to participate as a forum speaker in the Bill & Melinda Gates Foundation's Malaria Forum in October 2007. He traveled to Mali in December 2007 for a United Nations' Foundation trip to observe the distribution of insecticide treated bed nets and speak about leading healthy lifestyles.

For all his community work, in 2006 he was named Chicago Fire Humanitarian of the Year, and in 2007 he was named both Chicago Fire and Major League Soccer Humanitarian of the Year. In 2008, because of his service and his performance on the field, Gutiérrez received the Commissioner's Award, the highest honor in Major League Soccer. In 2009 Dr. Gutierrez was Inducted into the World Sports Humanitarian Hall of Fame, only the second soccer player ever inducted, after the great Pele.

On January 6, 2009, the White House issued a press release from President George W. Bush appointing Gutiérrez to the Presidential Council for Physical Fitness and Sports, an appointment that he continued to serve under President Obama until May 2010. Gutiérrez was named Head of Scouting and Player Development for MLS side Philadelphia Union on December 16, 2010.

He joined Sporting Kansas City as its lead television commentator ahead of the 2014 season while continuing to call UEFA Champions League matches for Fox Sports 1.

Gutiérrez received his undergraduate degree in psychology from Rockhurst University, an MBA from Rockhurst University's Helzberg School of Management, and a Doctorate in Business Administration from Creighton University's Heider School of Business. Dr. Gutiérrez is currently a faculty member at Rockhurst University's College of Business and resides in Kansas City, MO with his wife Ginna and their children, Mia, Lina, and Javier.
