= Arturo Angeles =

Mexican American soccer referee (born 1953)

- Full name: Arturo Angeles
- Born: 12 September 1953 (age 73); Mexico City, Mexico
- Other occupation: Civil engineer

Domestic
| Years | League | Role |
| 1975–2008 | North American Soccer League | Referee |
| 1996–2008 | Major League Soccer | Referee |

International
| Years | League | Role |
| 1988–1994 | FIFA listed | Referee |

Arturo Angeles (born September 12, 1953) is a Mexican American soccer referee. He supervised one match (Argentina–Greece) during the 1994 FIFA World Cup in his native country.

== Biography ==
Angeles was born on September 12, 1953, in Mexico City. Whilst studying engineering at the University of Southern California he played for the university team as a goalkeeper. He later became a civil engineer and worked for the Los Angeles Department of Water and Power whilst living in Temple City, California.

Angeles began refereeing in 1973, starting in the high school leagues. He joined the U.S. Soccer Federation referee programme in 1975, and moved up to the North American Soccer League. He was awarded his FIFA badge on January 1, 1988. He refereed at the 1989 FIFA World Youth Championship in Saudi Arabia, refereeing the match between Argentina and Norway. In 1990, he was added to FIFA's list of potential referees for the 1994 World Cup, and was eventually among the final 24 selected. He refereed two matches at the 1991 CONCACAF Gold Cup, two matches at the 1992 Summer Olympics and one match at the 1993 Copa America.

In the build-up to the 1994 World Cup, Angeles was forced to prepare alone as the United States did not have a national league at the time; he joined a running club and refereed friendly international matches in Los Angeles. He later refereed in the new Major League Soccer, and was selected as the referee for the 1998 U.S. Open Cup Final. He retired in 2008.
