= Jerzy Podbrożny =

Polish footballer (born 1966)

Personal information
- Date of birth: 16 December 1966 (age 59)
- Place of birth: Przemyśl, Poland
- Height: 1.76 m (5 ft 9 in)
- Position: Striker

Team information
- Current team: Orzeł Kampinos (player-manager)
- Number: 9

Youth career
- Polna Przemyśl

Senior career*
Years	Team	Apps	(Gls)
1989–1991	Polna Przemyśl		
1989–1991	Resovia		
1989–1991	Igloopol Dębica	62	(18)
1991–1994	Lech Poznań	85	(48)
1994–1996	Legia Warsaw	78	(45)
1996–1997	Mérida	33	(9)
1998	→ Toledo (loan)	7	(0)
1998–1999	Chicago Fire	55	(10)
1999–2000	Zagłębie Lubin	27	(11)
2001	Pogoń Szczecin	23	(6)
2002	Amica Wronki	14	(1)
2002	Wisła Płock	4	(0)
2003	Widzew Łódź	17	(4)
2004–2005	Świt Nowy Dwór Mazowiecki	3	(0)
2005	Victoria Września		
2011	Iskra Zgłobień		
2012–2015	Orzeł Kampinos		
2016	Promyk Nowa Sucha		
2016–	Orzeł Kampinos	12	(0)

International career
1991–1995	Poland	6	(0)

Managerial career
- 2006: Świt Nowy Dwór Mazowiecki
- 2006: Piast Piastów
- 2008–2011: Orkan Sochaczew
- 2012–2015: Orzeł Kampinos (player-manager)
- 2016: Promyk Nowa Sucha (player-manager)
- 2016–: Orzeł Kampinos (player-manager)
- * Club domestic league appearances and goals as of 17 December 2024

Jerzy "Gumiś" Podbrożny (born 17 December 1966) is a Polish former professional footballer who played as a striker. He is the player-manager of Orzeł Kampinos.

== Biography ==
Podbrożny led the Polish league in scoring: in 1992 with 20 goals and in 1993 with 25 goals, both times for Lech Poznań. After winning the championship both those years, he transferred to Legia Warsaw, and promptly won the next two titles. In 1996, Podbrożny moved to Spain, first with Mérida and then with Toledo. He then signed with the Chicago Fire, coming to Major League Soccer in the club's inaugural season in 1998, joining fellow Polish internationals Piotr Nowak and Roman Kosecki. Podbrożny went on to help the club to the MLS Cup and U.S. Open Cup double. He played two seasons in MLS, scoring 10 goals and 22 assists in league play. Fans loved him in Chicago for his candour.

Podbrożny was capped six times for the Poland national team.

In 2012, he became manager of amateur club Orzeł Kampinos.

== Honours ==
Lech Poznań

- Ekstraklasa: 1991–92, 1992–93
- Polish Super Cup: 1992

Legia Warsaw

- Ekstraklasa: 1993–94, 1994–95
- Polish Cup: 1993–94, 1994–95
- Polish Super Cup: 1994

Chicago Fire

- MLS Cup: 1998
- U.S. Open Cup: 1998

Orzeł Kampinos

- Klasa A Warsaw IV: 2023–24
- Klasa B Warsaw IV: 2014–15

Individual

- Ekstraklasa top scorer: 1991–92, 1992–93
