= Frank Klopas =

American soccer player

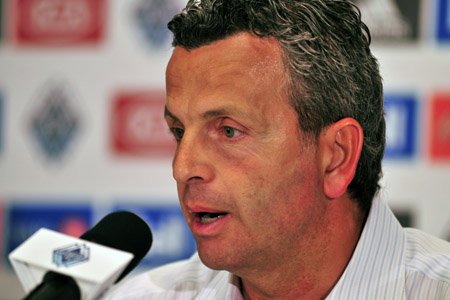

Personal information
- Full name: Fotios Klopas
- Date of birth: 1 September 1966 (age 60)
- Place of birth: Prosymna, Greece
- Height: 1.75 m (5 ft 9 in)
- Position: Forward

Senior career*
Years	Team	Apps	(Gls)
1983–1988	Chicago Sting (indoor)	140	(62)
1988–1993	AEK Athens	49	(6)
1994–1996	Apollon Athens	10	(0)
1996–1997	Kansas City Wizards	54	(7)
1998–1999	Chicago Fire	45	(6)
Total		298	(81)

International career
1987–1995	United States	39	(12)

Managerial career
- 2004–2006: Chicago Storm
- 2011–2013: Chicago Fire
- 2013–2015: Montreal Impact
- 2020–2023: Chicago Fire (assistant)
- 2023–2024: Chicago Fire
Medal record
Representing United States
Third place	CONCACAF Gold Cup	1996
Men's Soccer
- * Club domestic league appearances and goals

Fotios "Frank" Klopas (Greek: Φώτιος "Φρανκ" Κλόπας; born 1 September 1966) is an American former soccer player who played as a forward. Following his retirement, he served as a color commentator for the Chicago Fire before later working as a front office executive and head coach for both the Fire and Montreal Impact.

== Club career ==
=== Early years ===
Klopas emigrated to the United States from Prosymna, Peloponnese, Greece when he was eight years old and received U.S. citizenship on his 18th birthday. He and his family settled in Chicago, where he attended and played boys soccer, at Mather High School, which he led to the Chicago Public League championship his senior year.

=== Professional career ===
In 1983, he signed with the Chicago Sting of the North American Soccer League straight out of high school, but an injury led to him missing the team's final outdoor season. Klopas would play for the indoor Sting in the MISL for four seasons. He earned second team All Star honors during the 1986–1987 season.

On 4 November 1988, Klopas moved to Greece and signed for AEK Athens. He played four seasons with the team winning 4 championships a Greek Super Cup and the Greek League Cup. However, he tore his anterior cruciate ligament in 1991. That injury and a subsequent infection hindered his playing for nearly two years.

In 1992, Klopas signed a contract with the U.S. Soccer Federation to play full-time for the United States men's national soccer team, which was made effective when his contact with AEK expired, in December 1993. After the 1994 FIFA World Cup, Klopas returned to Greece and signed with Apollon Athens in 1994 for the remainder of the 1994–1995 season, as well as the 1995–1996 season. He debuted with Apollon against his former club, AEK.

In 1996, Major League Soccer began developing teams for its inaugural season. In order to ensure an equitable distribution of talent to each team, MLS allocated known players to each team. MLS allocated Klopas to the Kansas City Wizards where he would spend two years. After being sent to the Columbus Crew just before the 1997 MLS Expansion Draft, he was traded in February 1998 to the Chicago Fire for Jason Farrell, who had been selected from the Crew. Klopas would play two years for Chicago before retiring, helping them to the MLS Cup in 1998 and the U.S. Open Cup to complete "The Double." In four years in MLS, Klopas scored 13 goals and added 16 assists. He had six goals and five assists in 40 games—24 starts—for the Fire, including both goals in a 2–0 win over the Tampa Bay Mutiny in the Fire's first ever game at Soldier Field on April 4, 1998. Klopas' most notable goal for the Fire came in Golden Goal overtime of a 2–1 win over the Columbus Crew in the 1998 U.S. Open Cup Final at Soldier Field.

Klopas retired following the 1999 season. He was inducted into Chicago's "Ring of Fire," which celebrates outstanding players and contributors to the organization, in 2004. He was inducted into the Illinois Soccer Hall of Fame in 2005.

== International career ==
Klopas made his debut for the U.S. national team in 1987, coming on in a 2–0 Olympic Qualifying loss at Canada on 23 May. Though this was technically his debut for the team, it isn't counted among his senior national team caps as Olympic play is not considered to be of full international status by FIFA even though many of the players that made up the side were full national team players. Klopas was also on the U.S. team at the 1987 Pan American Games. In total, Klopas earned five Olympic team appearances, scoring one goal in a 4–2 qualifying win at El Salvador on October 18, 1987, and helping the team qualify for the 1988 Olympics. Klopas would start and play the full 90 minutes in a 0–0 draw with hosts South Korea and a 4–2 loss to the Soviet Union as the U.S. failed to advance from their group.

Klopas made his full senior team debut when he came on as a halftime substitute for Chico Borja in a 2–0 friendly loss to Colombia in Miami on May 14, 1988. He scored his first two international goals in a 5–1 defeat of Jamaica in St. Louis in the second leg of a home-and-home World Cup qualifying series on August 13, 1988. Despite appearing in seven of 10 U.S. World Cup qualifiers for the 1990 FIFA World Cup, Klopas did not make the trip to the team's 1–0 clinching victory over Trinidad & Tobago on November 19, 1989, because head coach Bob Gansler didn't think he was fit enough. Subsequently, he was not included among the 22-man U.S. squad that went to Italy for the tournament.

Injuries and the fact that he was playing abroad in Greece at a time when the National Team was run like a club team limited Klopas to just three caps between 1990 and 1993. In early 1994, Klopas returned from surgery on his anterior cruciate ligament and began working towards a place on the hosting U.S. side's roster for the 1994 FIFA World Cup. Under the guidance of Bora Milutinovic, the U.S. team took on a conservative, defensive approach in the lead-up to the tournament which was also predicated upon the fact that the side didn't have a lot of offensive weapons. Klopas returned to the national team on February 18, coming on as a halftime substitute for Joe-Max Moore in a 1–1 draw with Bolivia in Miami. Over the next few months, he continued to build his fitness up and scored his third international goal in the team's 3–0 friendly win over Moldova on April 20 in Davidson, N.C.

Klopas would go on to score five goals in the eight international friendlies the U.S. played immediately prior to the start of the World Cup, tallying against Iceland, Estonia, Armenia and his native Greece. He also scored a brace in a pre-World Cup friendly against Bundesliga champions Bayern Munich on May 22, 1994, and went on to make the U.S. roster.

Despite his recent strike rate, Klopas was left out of the starting 11 for the American's historic 1–1 draw vs. Switzerland and didn't appear in their opening match of the tournament played June 18 at the Pontiac Silverdome. Four days later, Klopas again didn't see the field as the U.S. upset pre-tournament favorites Colombia 2–1 at The Rose Bowl in Pasadena, Calif, putting the team in a great position to advance to the second round. With the U.S. team earning four of a possible six points from their first two matches, Milutinovic only made one lineup change throughout the group stage. The U.S. team's lack of offense was exposed in the group finale vs. Romania, falling 1–0 but still finishing as one of the tournament's best third place teams, which allowed them to advance to a Round of 16 date with Brazil on July 4.

After the lack of scoring chances created against Romania, Milutinovic's decision not to play Klopas was brought into question the day before the Knockout Round match, to which the Serbian manager said, "He can score, but what else?". Klopas responded to Milutinovic's assessment of his play saying, "He said that? I don't know why he would feel that way. I can play wherever he needs me to play. This is the only time I've actually played striker. My five years in Greece, I played midfield and attacker. I'll play any position the team needs me to play. Where I am now, it's not my duty to defend."

Despite the suspension of starting midfielder John Harkes for the Brazil game and Tab Ramos leaving the game in the first half after catching an elbow from left back Leonardo, Klopas was not used in the match as Hugo Perez replaced Harkes in the starting lineup and Eric Wynalda came on for Ramos. The U.S. held well defensively but were undone by Bebeto's 72nd-minute strike and fell 1–0 to the eventual champions at Stanford Stadium.

Despite not playing in the team's four biggest matches of the year, Klopas played in the team's remaining four friendlies in 1994 and scored three more goals to finish as the U.S. team's top goal scorer that year, tallying eight goals in 15 appearances.

Klopas' swan song with the U.S. team came the following year when he was named to the roster for the 1995 Copa América. He would appear in five of the team's six games and scored the first goal in a 3–0 shocker over Argentina on July 14, 1995, one of the biggest upsets in U.S. Soccer history. He also scored the game-winning goal in the penalty shootout against Mexico in the quarterfinals three days later. Just over a year after being knocked out of the World Cup, the Brazilians were once again responsible for the U.S. team's exit, sending them to a 1–0 semifinal defeat on July 20 in Maldonado, Uruguay. Klopas played in the team's final two friendlies that year, with his final appearance for the U.S. coming as an 80th-minute substitute for Tab Ramos in a 4–3 win over Saudi Arabia on October 8, 1995, in Washington, D.C.

From 1988 to 1995, Klopas amassed 39 senior international caps, scoring 12 goals. At the end of 1995, Klopas sat fourth on the U.S. all-time goal scoring list behind Bruce Murray, Eric Wynalda and Hugo Perez. He now sits 16th on the list and along with Bobby Wood jointly holds the distinction as the U.S. players with the most goals scored without appearing in a FIFA World Cup match.

== Managerial career ==
In 2000, the Chicago Fire hired Klopas as the team's strength and conditioning trainer. After the 2000 MLS season, he resigned for personal reasons. In 2004, he was named the head coach and general manager of MISL's expansion franchise Chicago Storm. He led the team to a playoff berth in its second season but resigned in July 2006. In January 2008, he was named the first technical director for the Fire. He was appointed the Fire's interim head coach following the dismissal of Carlos de los Cobos in May 2011. Klopas earned his first MLS win as coach in a 1–0 victory over the Columbus Crew thirteen days later on June 12. The Fire finished the season 8–5–10 under Klopas, just missing the playoffs. He coached the Fire through the following two seasons before stepping down after the 2013 season.

In December 2013, he was named head coach and director of player personnel of the Montreal Impact. While he did lead the Impact to a CONCACAF Champions League final in 2015, narrowly losing to Mexican powerhouse Club América, he was formally relieved of his duties in late August 2015 after a string of poor performances, and replaced on an interim basis by Mauro Biello.

After serving as a color commentator for the Fire, Klopas returned to their sideline as an assistant coach in January 2020. He was named interim head coach on May 8, 2023, following the dismissal of Ezra Hendrickson. He stepped down at the end of the 2024 season and was replaced by former U.S. National Men's Team coach Gregg Berhalter.

== Personal life ==
Klopas lives in Chicago with his wife, Sophia.

== Career statistics ==
=== International ===
Appearances and goals by national team and year
National team	Year	Apps	Goals
United States	1987	5	2
United States	1988	8	2
United States	1989	5	0
United States	1990	1	0
United States	1991	1	1
United States	1993	1	0
United States	1994	15	8
United States	1995	10	1
Total		46	14

Scores and results list United States' goal tally first, score column indicates score after each Klopas goal.

List of international goals scored by Frank Klopas
No.	Date	Venue	Opponent	Score	Result	Competition	Ref.
1	9 August 1987	Indianapolis, United States	Trinidad and Tobago	3–1	3–1	Friendly	
2	18 October 1987	Cuscatlán Stadium, San Salvador, El Salvador	El Salvador	2–0	4–2	1988 CONCACAF Pre-Olympic Tournament	
3	13 August 1988	St. Louis Soccer Park, Fenton, United States	Jamaica	3–1	5–1	1990 FIFA World Cup qualification	
4	13 August 1988	St. Louis Soccer Park, Fenton, United States	Jamaica	5–1	5–1	1990 FIFA World Cup qualification	
5	4 September 1991	İnönü Stadium, Istanbul, Turkey	Turkey	1–1	1–1	Friendly	
6	20 April 1994	Richardson Stadium, Davidson, United States	Moldova	1–0	3–0	Friendly	
7	24 April 1994	DeVore Stadium, Chula Vista, United States	Iceland	1–1	1–2	Friendly	
8	7 May 1994	Titan Stadium, Fullerton, United States	Estonia	1–0	4–0	Friendly	
9	15 May 1994	Titan Stadium, Fullerton, United States	Armenia	1–0	1–0	Friendly	
10	28 May 1994	Yale Bowl, New Haven, United States	Greece	1–0	1–1	Friendly	
11	19 October 1994	Prince Saud bin Jalawi Stadium, Khobar, Saudi Arabia	Saudi Arabia	1–1	1–2	Friendly	
12	22 November 1994	National Stadium, Kingston, Jamaica	Jamaica	2–0	3–0	Friendly	
13	22 November 1994	National Stadium, Kingston, Jamaica	Jamaica	3–0	3–0	Friendly	
14	14 July 1995	Estadio Parque Artigas, Paysandú, Uruguay	Argentina	1–0	3–0	1995 Copa América	

== Coaching statistics ==
As of October 19, 2024

Team	From	To	Record				
Team	From	To	G	W	D	L	Win %
Chicago Fire	May 30, 2011	October 30, 2013	76	34	17	25	44.74
Montreal Impact	December 18, 2013	August 30, 2015	58	16	16	26	27.59
Chicago Fire	September 30, 2021	November 7, 2021	6	2	1	3	33.33
Chicago Fire	May 8, 2023	October 19, 2024	66	18	16	32	27.27
Total			206	70	50	86	33.98

== Honors ==
=== As a player ===
Chicago Sting

- NASL Championship: 1984

AEK Athens

- Alpha Ethniki: 1988–89, 1991–92, 1992–93, 1993–94
- Greek Super Cup: 1989
- Greek League Cup: 1990

Chicago Fire

- MLS Cup: 1998
- U.S. Open Cup: 1998

=== As a coach ===
Montreal Impact

- Canadian Championship: 2014
- CONCACAF Champions League - Runners-up: 2014–15
