= 1999 Columbus Crew season =

Columbus Crew
1999 season
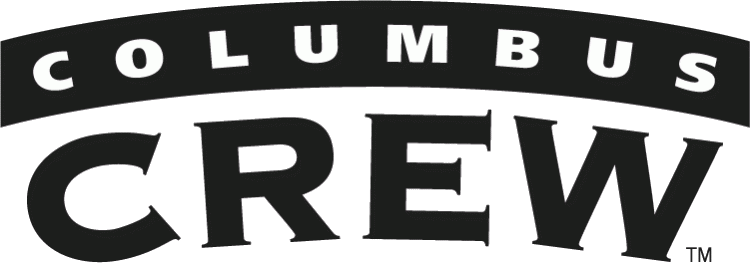
- Investor-operators: Lamar Hunt; Clark Hunt; Dan Hunt; Lamar Hunt Jr. Sharron Hunt Munson; Ron Pizzuti and a group of local investors
- Head Coach: Tom Fitzgerald
- Stadium: Columbus Crew Stadium
- Major League Soccer: Conference: 2nd Overall: 6th
- MLS Cup playoffs: Conference finals
- U.S. Open Cup: Semifinals
- Top goalscorer: League: Stern John (18); All: Stern John (25)
- Highest home attendance: 24,741 (5/15 v. NE)
- Lowest home attendance: 9,188 (10/17 v. TB)
- Average home league attendance: 16,950 (75.1%)
- Biggest win: CLB 5–1 DC (11/7); CLB 4–0 MIA (8/1)
- Biggest defeat: DC 4–0 CLB (11/13)
Home colors	Away colors

The 1999 Columbus Crew season was the club's fourth season of existence and their fourth consecutive season in Major League Soccer, the top flight of soccer in the United States. The first match of the season was on March 28 against NY/NJ MetroStars. It was the fourth season under head coach Tom Fitzgerald. The Crew became the first team in Major League Soccer with a soccer-specific stadium with the opening of Columbus Crew Stadium on May 15.

== Roster ==
As of April 1, 1999

Note: Flags indicate national team as defined under FIFA eligibility rules; some limited exceptions apply. Players may hold more than one non-FIFA nationality.

No.	Pos.	Nation	Player
1	GK	USA	Juergen Sommer
2	DF	USA	Mike Lapper (captain)
3	DF	USA	Mike Clark
5	DF	USA	Thomas Dooley (captain)
6	MF	USA	Todd Yeagley
7	MF	USA	Matt Kmosko
8	FW	JAM	Andy Williams
9	FW	USA	Billy Thompson
10	MF	USA	Brian Maisonneuve
11	FW	USA	Jeff Cunningham
12	MF	USA	Jason Farrell

No.	Pos.	Nation	Player
13	DF	TRI	Ancil Elcock
14	FW	TRI	Stern John
15	DF	USA	Matt Chulis
16	MF	USA	Rob Smith
17	FW	USA	Brian West
18	GK	USA	Matt Napoleon
19	MF	POL	Robert Warzycha
20	FW	USA	Brian McBride (captain)
24	MF	USA	John DeBrito
25	DF	USA	Ubusuku Abukusumo
33	GK	USA	Mark Dougherty

== Technical Staff ==
Position	Staff
President/General Manager	(United States) Jamey Rootes
Head Coach	(United States) Tom Fitzgerald
Assistant Coach/Goalkeeper Coach	(United States) Greg Andrulis
Assistant Coach/Scout	(United States) Nick Roberts
Head Trainer	(United States) Amy Baer

== Non-competitive ==
=== Preseason ===
February 12 Friendly	Columbus Crew	2-2	UCF Golden Knights
7:30 PM EST		Report

February 13 Friendly	Columbus Crew	1-1	U.S. U-17 National Team	Sanford, FL
	80' (pen.)	Report	Beckerman 65'	Stadium: Seminole County Park

February 16 Friendly	Columbus Crew	2-0	ÍBV	Cocoa Beach, FL
		Report		Stadium: Cocoa Expo Sports Center

February 18 Friendly	Columbus Crew	8-0	Florida Tech Panthers
		Report

February 21 Friendly	Columbus Crew	2-1	Lynn Fighting Knights
		Report

February 23 Friendly	Columbus Crew	4-2	South Florida Bulls
4:00 PM EST		Report

February 25 Friendly	Columbus Crew	3-3	Lyngby Boldklub	Cocoa Beach, FL
7:30 PM EST	Cunningham; Dooley; Elcock 90'		Fredgaard, Bidstrup	Stadium: Cocoa Expo Sports Center

February 27 Friendly	Columbus Crew	4-1	Tampa Bay Mutiny	Tarpon Springs, FL
5:00 PM EST		Report		Stadium: Tarpon Springs High School

February 28 Friendly	Columbus Crew	2-1	Charlotte 49ers	Sanford, FL
		Report

March 2 Friendly	Tampa Spartans	0-7	Columbus Crew	Tampa, FL
		Report		Stadium: University of Tampa

March 6 Friendly	Rollins Tars	1-5	Columbus Crew	Winter Park, FL
	Goal	Report	Cunningham, John; Thompson; Dooley	Stadium: Rollins College

March 14 Friendly	Columbus Crew	7-0	Dayton Gems	Columbus, OH
		Report		Stadium: Woody Hayes Athletic Center

March 16 Friendly	Columbus Crew	v	Dayton Gems	Obetz, OH
7:00 PM EST		Report		Stadium: Crew Training Facility

March 18 Friendly	Ohio Wesleyan Battling Bishops	v	Columbus Crew	Delaware, OH
7:00 PM EST		Report		Stadium: Ohio Wesleyan University

=== Midseason ===
April 20 Friendly	Cincinnati Riverhawks	0-3	Columbus Crew	Wilder, KY
7:00 PM EDT			Cunningham 31'; Thompson 80'; Farrell 86'	Stadium: Town and Country Soccer Complex; Attendance: 3,000

May 1 Dayton Cup	Columbus Crew	2-4	Kansas City Wizards	Washington Township, OH
8:00 PM EDT	Cunningham 27'; Yeagley		Klein,	Stadium: Centerville Soccer Stadium; Attendance: 5,000

July 20 Friendly	Rochester Raging Rhinos	2-3	Columbus Crew	Rochester, NY
	Tilley 16'; Miller 23'; Tanner (red card) 88'	Report	Warzycha 15'; Cunningham 79'; Kmosko 85'	Stadium: Frontier Field; Attendance: 9,824

== Competitive ==
=== Overview ===
Competition	First match	Last match	Starting round	Final position	Record							
Competition	First match	Last match	Starting round	Final position	Pld	W	D	L	GF	GA	GD	Win %
Major League Soccer	March 28, 1999	October 10, 1999	Matchday 1	6th	32	13	6	13	48	39	+9	40.63
MLS Cup Playoffs	October 17, 1999	November 13, 1999	Conference Semifinals	Conference Finals	5	3	0	2	10	6	+4	60.00
U.S. Open Cup	July 13, 1999	September 1, 1999	Third Round	Semifinals	3	2	0	1	8	4	+4	66.67
Total					40	18	6	16	66	49	+17	45.00

Source: Competitions

=== MLS ===
==== Standings ====
===== Eastern Conference =====
Pos	Team	Pld	W	SOW	L	GF	GA	GD	Pts	Qualification
1	D.C. United	32	17	6	9	65	43	+22	57	MLS Cup Playoffs
2	Columbus Crew	32	13	6	13	48	39	+9	45	MLS Cup Playoffs
3	Tampa Bay Mutiny	32	9	5	18	51	50	+1	32	MLS Cup Playoffs
4	Miami Fusion	32	8	5	19	42	59	−17	29	MLS Cup Playoffs
5	New England Revolution	32	7	5	20	38	53	−15	26	

Source: MLS

===== Overall table =====
Pos	Team	Pld	W	SOW	L	GF	GA	GD	Pts
4	Chicago Fire	32	15	3	14	51	36	+15	48
5	Colorado Rapids	32	14	6	12	38	39	−1	48
6	Columbus Crew	32	13	6	13	48	39	+9	45
7	San Jose Clash	32	9	10	13	48	49	−1	37
8	Tampa Bay Mutiny	32	9	5	18	51	50	+1	32

Source: MLS
Rules for classification: 1) points; 2) head-to-head record; 3) goal difference; 4) number of goals scored

==== Results summary ====
Overall								Home						Away					
Pld	Pts	W	L	T	GF	GA	GD	W	L	T	GF	GA	GD	W	L	T	GF	GA	GD
32	45	13	13	6	48	39	+9	7	6	3	29	18	+11	6	7	3	19	21	−2

Source: MLS standings
Pld = Matches played; Pts = Points; W = Matches won; T = Matches tied; L = Matches lost; GF = Goals for; GA = Goals against; GD = Goal difference

==== Results by round ====
Round	1	2	3	4	5	6	7	8	9	10	11	12	13	14	15	16	17	18	19	20	21	22	23	24	25	26	27	28	29	30	31	32
Stadium	A	A	A	A	A	A	A	H	H	H	A	H	H	H	H	A	H	A	H	H	H	A	A	H	A	H	H	A	A	H	A	H
Result	L	W	SW	SW	L	W	W	W	L	SW	L	L	SW	W	SW	W	L	L	W	W	W	L	W	L	L	W	L	SW	W	W	L	L

Source: schedule
A = Away; H = Home; W = Win; L = Loss; SW = Shootout Win

==== Match results ====
March 28 1	NY/NJ MetroStars	1-0	Columbus Crew	East Rutherford, NJ
1:00 PM EST	Corrales (yellow card) 51'; Petke 80'; Villegas (yellow card) 87'	Report	Lapper (yellow card) 21'	Stadium: Giants Stadium; Attendance: 20,307; Referee: Kevin Terry; Assistant referees: Richard Eddy; Francisco Sanchez; Fourth official: Jorge De La Bandera

April 3 2	Tampa Bay Mutiny	2-3	Columbus Crew	Tampa, FL
7:00 PM EST	Jara (yellow card) 5'; Ralston 29'; Shannon 65'; Eriksson (yellow card) 82'	Report	Yeagley 15'; Elcock (yellow card) 36'; John 41'; Farrell (yellow card) 67'; McBride 83'	Stadium: Raymond James Stadium; Attendance: 13,456; Referee: Paul Tamberino; Assistant referees: Kermit Quisenberry; Glenn Prechac; Fourth official: Jaime Guerra

April 8 3	Los Angeles Galaxy	1-1 (2-3 SO)	Columbus Crew	Pasadena, CA
10:30 PM EDT	Jones 55'	Report	John 66'	Stadium: Rose Bowl; Attendance: 4,825; Referee: Alex Prus; Assistant referees: Roberto Van de Wyngard; Zekay Akbay; Fourth official: Raymundo Prisco
	Shootout
	Wélton (penalty missed); Jones (penalty missed); Mathis (penalty scored); Cienfuegos (penalty scored); Vanney (penalty missed)		(penalty scored) John; (penalty scored) McBride; (penalty missed) Cunningham; (penalty scored) Warzycha; (penalty missed) Dooley

April 17 4	New England Revolution	0-0 (1-4 SO)	Columbus Crew	Foxborough, MA
7:30 PM EDT	Kuhn (yellow card) 75'	Report	Lapper (yellow card) 83'	Stadium: Foxboro Stadium; Attendance: 14,732; Referee: Nancy Lay; Assistant referees: Gerry Corrie; Wayshak Hill; Fourth official: Bahij Salman
	Shootout
	Moore (penalty missed); Kelderman (penalty scored); Jair (penalty missed)		(penalty scored) John; (penalty scored) McBride; (penalty scored) Cunningham; (penalty scored) Farrell

April 24 5	Dallas Burn	2-0	Columbus Crew	Dallas, TX
8:30 PM EDT	Pareja 4'; Kreis 31'	Report		Stadium: Cotton Bowl; Attendance: 12,241; Referee: Richard Heron; Assistant referees: Chip Reed; Sergio Vega; Fourth official: Gibby Widner

April 28 6	Kansas City Wizards	0-1	Columbus Crew	Kansas City, MO
12:30 PM EDT	Šabanadžović (yellow card) 5'; Figueroa (yellow card) 11'; Johnston (yellow card) 43'; Okafor (yellow card) 58'; Lalas (yellow card) 70'; Preki (yellow card) 83'	Report	Farrell 88'	Stadium: Arrowhead Stadium; Attendance: 6,069; Referee: Stuart Dougal; Assistant referees: Gerry Corrie; Richard Huber; Fourth official: Joe Heyden

May 9 7	San Jose Clash	1-2	Columbus Crew	San Jose, CA
5:00 PM EDT	Clark 38'; Conrad (yellow card) 57'; Barrett (yellow card) 61'; Mulrooney (yellow card) 69'; Wright (yellow card) 77'	Report	Cunningham 17', 70'; Yeagley (yellow card) 53'	Stadium: Spartan Stadium; Attendance: 9,931; Referee: Rich Grady; Assistant referees: Albert Echeverria; Ali Mohebbi; Fourth official: Joe Pimentel

May 15 8	Columbus Crew	2-0	New England Revolution	Columbus, OH
7:30 PM EDT	Cunningham 10', (yellow card) 83'; John 59'	Report	Kelderman (yellow card) 15'; Dos Santos (yellow card) 80'	Stadium: Columbus Crew Stadium; Attendance: 24,741; Referee: Brian Hall; Assistant referees: Nate Clement; Brian Darling; Fourth official: Patrick Ruetschle

May 22 9	Columbus Crew	0-0 (1-3 SO)	Tampa Bay Mutiny	Columbus, OH
7:30 PM EDT		Report	Jara (yellow card) 77'; Garlick (yellow card) 84'; McCarty (yellow card) 88'	Stadium: Columbus Crew Stadium; Attendance: 20,782; Referee: Ali Mohamed Bujsaim; Assistant referees: Greg Barkey; Jamil Hamdan; Fourth official: J.R. Perdue
	Shootout
	John (penalty missed); Farrell (penalty missed); Elcock (penalty scored); Maisonneuve (penalty missed)		(penalty scored) Marino; (penalty scored) Ralston; (penalty scored) Moore; (penalty missed) Salcedo

May 29 10	Columbus Crew	1-1 (3-0 SO)	Los Angeles Galaxy	Columbus, OH
7:30 PM EDT	Clark (yellow card) 5'; Elcock (yellow card) 77'; Cunningham 88'	Report	Franchino (yellow card) 26'; Jones 57'; Pena (yellow card) 73'	Stadium: Columbus Crew Stadium; Attendance: 16,596; Referee: Ricardo Valenzuela; Assistant referees: John Spicer-Escalante; Brian Darling; Fourth official: Mikael Lundqvist
	Shootout
	Billy Thompson (penalty scored); John (penalty scored); Cunningham (penalty scored)		(penalty missed) Jones; (penalty missed) Wélton; (penalty missed) Cienfuegos

June 5 11	D.C. United	1-0	Columbus Crew	Washington, D.C.
7:30 PM EDT	Aunger (yellow card) 9'; Moore (yellow card) 56'; Soñora 65'; Lassiter (yellow card) 83'; Etcheverry (yellow card) 87'	Report	Farrell (yellow card) 11'	Stadium: Robert F. Kennedy Memorial Stadium; Attendance: 18,234; Referee: Tim Weyland; Assistant referees: Craig Lowry; Rob Fereday; Fourth official: Kenneth Kaplan

June 13 12	Columbus Crew	1-2	D.C. United	Columbus, OH
4:00 PM EDT	Chulis (yellow card) 20'; Cunningham 69'	Report	Moreno 34', (yellow card) 65', (goal) 66'; Moore · (yellow card) 56' (yellow-red card) 61'	Stadium: Columbus Crew Stadium; Attendance: 17,386; Referee: Kevin Terry; Assistant referees: Richard Eddy; Roberto Van de Wyngard; Fourth official: J.R. Perdue

June 16 13	Columbus Crew	1-1 (2-1 SO)	New England Revolution	Columbus, OH
7:30 PM EDT	Cunningham 14'	Report	Savarese 5'; Dunseth (yellow card) 25'; McKinley (yellow card) 28'	Stadium: Columbus Crew Stadium; Attendance: 14,005; Referee: Michael Kennedy; Assistant referees: Zekay Akbay; Jamil Hamdan; Fourth official: Mikael Lundqvist
	Shootout
	Thompson (penalty missed); John (penalty missed); Cunningham (penalty scored); McBride (penalty scored)		(penalty missed) Beasley; (penalty missed) Harkes; (penalty scored) Moore; (penalty missed) Parra; (penalty missed) Burns

June 26 14	Columbus Crew	2-1	NY/NJ MetroStars	Columbus, OH
7:30 PM EDT	Warzycha (yellow card) 19'; Lapper (yellow card) 23'; John 32'; Farrell (yellow card) 65'; Maisonneuve 68'; Kmosko (yellow card) 90'	Report	Sorber (yellow card) 28'; Walsh (yellow card) 68', (goal) 80'	Stadium: Columbus Crew Stadium; Attendance: 18,632; Referee: Marcel Yonan; Assistant referees: Edwin Resendes; J.R. Perdue; Fourth official: Douglas Palomaki

June 30 15	Columbus Crew	3-3 (2-1 SO)	San Jose Clash	Columbus, OH
7:30 PM EDT	Lapper (yellow card) 12'; Elcock 37'; Farrell (yellow card) 65'; John 79', 90'	Report	Cerritos 25', (yellow card) 55', (goal) 69'; Arce 83'; Mulrooney (yellow card) 86'	Stadium: Columbus Crew Stadium; Attendance: 15,397; Referee: Kermit Quisenberry; Assistant referees: John Spicer-Escalante; Brian Darling; Fourth official: Mikael Lundqvist
	Shootout
	Thompson (penalty missed); John (penalty scored); West (penalty missed); McBride (penalty missed); Warzycha (penalty scored)		(penalty scored) Cerritos; (penalty missed) Lewis; (penalty missed) Clark; (penalty missed) Baicher; (penalty missed) Arce

July 4 16	Colorado Rapids	0-3	Columbus Crew	Denver, CO
9:00 PM EDT		Report	Lapper 8'; John 66', 80'	Stadium: Mile High Stadium; Attendance: 51,025; Referee: Robert Sheker; Assistant referees: Craig Lowry; Scott McCaslin; Fourth official: Craig Burns

July 7 17	Columbus Crew	1-1 (0-2 SO)	D.C. United	Columbus, OH
7:30 PM EDT	Elcock (yellow card) 29'; John 56'; Lapper (yellow card) 63'; Cunningham (yellow card) 76'; Thompson (yellow card) 82'	Report	Kamler (yellow card) 40'; Wood 27'; Lassiter (yellow card) 61'; Agoos (yellow card) 63'; Llamosa (red card) 75'	Stadium: Columbus Crew Stadium; Attendance: 18,101; Referee: Noel Kenny; Assistant referees: Greg Barkey; Roberto Van de Wyngard; Fourth official: Patrick Ruetschle
	Shootout
	Thompson (penalty missed); John (penalty missed); Cunningham (penalty missed); Elcock (penalty missed)		(penalty scored) Agoos; (penalty missed) Wood; (penalty missed) Soñora; (penalty missed) Lassiter; (penalty scored) Kamler

July 10 18	Miami Fusion F.C.	2-0	Columbus Crew	Fort Lauderdale, FL
7:30 PM EDT	Serna 31'; Gutierrez 85' (pen.); Martínez (yellow card) 87'	Report	Warzycha (yellow card) 46'	Stadium: Lockhart Stadium; Attendance: 10,123; Referee: Paul Tamberino; Assistant referees: Nate Clement; Tarek Khan; Fourth official: Adam Nemhe

July 24 19	Columbus Crew	4-1	Dallas Burn	Columbus, OH
7:30 PM EDT	Elcock 28'; Cunningham 42'; John 50'; West 71'	Report	Deering (yellow card) 31'; Álvarez (yellow card) 32' (yellow-red card) 82'; Eck 90'	Stadium: Columbus Crew Stadium; Attendance: 19,356; Referee: Noel Kenny; Assistant referees: Roger Sill; Richard Huber; Fourth official: Douglas Palomaki

August 1 20	Columbus Crew	4-0	Miami Fusion F.C.	Columbus, OH
1:00 PM EDT	John 12', 83', 90'; Maisonneuve 43'	Report	Serna (yellow card) 27'; Vargas (yellow card) 35'; Gutierrez (yellow card) 49'	Stadium: Columbus Crew Stadium; Attendance: 13,891; Referee: Kevin Stott; Assistant referees: Chip Reed; Jamil Hamdan; Fourth official: Douglas Palomaki

August 8 21	Columbus Crew	2-1	Kansas City Wizards	Columbus, OH
6:00 PM EDT	Warzycha 22', (yellow card) 62'; Elcock 70'; Maisonneuve (yellow card) 88'	Report	Lalas (yellow card) 49'; Brown 55'; Bowers (yellow card) 58'; Winner (yellow card) 79'; Okafor (red card) 79'	Stadium: Columbus Crew Stadium; Attendance: 16,639; Referee: Ali Saheli; Assistant referees: Roberto Van de Wyngard; Zekay Akbay; Fourth official: Mikael Lundqvist

August 14 22	D.C. United	2-1	Columbus Crew	Washington, D.C.
4:00 PM EDT	Maessner 33'; Aunger (yellow card) 50'; Moreno 58' (pen.)	Report	DeBrito (yellow card) 43'; Cunningham 47'; Elcock (yellow card) 55'; McBride (yellow card) 84'; Warzycha (yellow card) 84'	Stadium: Robert F. Kennedy Memorial Stadium; Attendance: 15,312; Referee: Brian Hall; Assistant referees: Craig Lowry; Bill Dittmar; Fourth official: Daniel Stead

August 18 23	NY/NJ MetroStars	2-4	Columbus Crew	East Rutherford, NJ
7:00 PM EDT	Duhaney (yellow card) 14'; Semioli 38'; Zambrano (yellow card) 75'; Wolyniec 77'	Report	John 17', 59', 62'; DeBrito (yellow card) 21', (goal) 47'; Dougherty (yellow card) 77'	Stadium: Giants Stadium; Attendance: 7,246; Referee: Kevin Stott; Assistant referees: Ruben Rodhas; Matt Lawlor; Fourth official: Ricardo Renderos

August 22 24	Columbus Crew	1-1 (0-3 SO)	Tampa Bay Mutiny	Columbus, OH
4:00 PM EDT	Elcock (yellow card) 13'; McBride 38'	Report	Shannon (yellow card) 17'; Addo (yellow card) 32'; Arce 64' (pen.)	Stadium: Columbus Crew Stadium; Attendance: 19,070; Referee: Paul Tamberino; Assistant referees: Edwin Resendes; Tarek Khan; Fourth official: Douglas Palomaki
	Shootout
	McBride (penalty missed); John (penalty missed); Billy Thompson (penalty missed)		(penalty scored) Marino; (penalty scored) Keller; (penalty scored) Ralston

August 27 25	Tampa Bay Mutiny	2-1	Columbus Crew	Tampa, FL
7:30 PM EDT	Kotschau 29'; McCarty (yellow card) 39'; Arce 48'	Report	Yeagley (yellow card) 46'; Warzycha 71'; Maisonneuve (yellow card) 80'	Stadium: Raymond James Stadium; Attendance: 14,188; Referee: Sandra Hunt; Assistant referees: Roger Sill; Mario Martinez; Fourth official: Robert Thunelius

September 4 26	Columbus Crew	2-1	Colorado Rapids	Columbus, OH
7:30 PM EDT	John 13'; Warzycha 68'	Report	Balboa 35'; Martin (yellow card) 40'	Stadium: Columbus Crew Stadium; Attendance: 19,521; Referee: Brian Hall; Assistant referees: Greg Barkey; J.R. Perdue; Fourth official: Patrick Ruetschle

September 12 27	Columbus Crew	1-2	NY/NJ MetroStars	Columbus, OH
1:00 PM EDT	McBride 43'; Clark (yellow card) 60'	Report	Hurtado 38'; Corrales (yellow card) 50'; Hurtado (yellow card) 55'; Kelly (yellow card) 83'; Zambrano 86'	Stadium: Columbus Crew Stadium; Attendance: 14,782; Referee: Sandra Hunt; Assistant referees: Chip Reed; Zekay Akbay; Fourth official: Patrick Ruetschle

September 18 28	New England Revolution	0-0 (1-4 SO)	Columbus Crew	Foxborough, MA
7:30 PM EDT	Baicher (yellow card) 4'; Harkes (yellow card) 24'; Álvarez (yellow card) 61'; Chronopoulos (yellow card) 61'	Report	West (yellow card) 11'; Warzycha (yellow card) 31'	Stadium: Foxboro Stadium; Attendance: 16,278; Referee: Ted Covaciu; Assistant referees: Peter Kokolski; Thomas Supple; Fourth official: Claudiu Badea
	Shootout
	Moore (penalty scored); Savarese (penalty missed); Harkes (penalty missed)		(penalty scored) Cunningham; (penalty scored) John; (penalty scored) Warzycha; (penalty scored) Elcock

September 23 29	Chicago Fire	1-2	Columbus Crew	Chicago, IL
8:00 PM EDT	Kosecki 3', (yellow card) 32'; Razov (yellow card) 58'	Report	Cunningham 5', 21'; Dougherty (yellow card) 72'	Stadium: Soldier Field; Attendance: 13,550; Referee: Brian Hall; Assistant referees: Francisco Sanchez; Terry Vaughn; Fourth official: Victor Matheson

September 26 30	Columbus Crew	2-1	Miami Fusion F.C.	Columbus, OH
1:00 PM EDT	McBride 76', 81'	Report	Wynalda 43'	Stadium: Columbus Crew Stadium; Attendance: 15,251; Referee: Tim Weyland; Assistant referees: Robert Sheker; J.R. Perdue; Fourth official: Patrick Ruetschle

October 3 31	Miami Fusion F.C.	4-1	Columbus Crew	Fort Lauderdale, FL
7:30 PM EDT	Gorter 22', 90'; Gutierrez 34'; Bilyk (yellow card) 38'; Heaps 42'; Kamler (red card) 82'	Report	Dooley (yellow card) 65'; Cunningham 83' (pen.)	Stadium: Lockhart Stadium; Attendance: 5,862; Referee: Alex Prus; Assistant referees: Roger Sill; Robbie Mann; Fourth official: Brian Poeschel

October 10 32	Columbus Crew	2-2 (1-2 SO)	Chicago Fire	Columbus, OH
1:00 PM EDT	John 5'; Cunningham 65'; Clark (yellow card) 70'; Dougherty (yellow card) 79'	Report	Gutiérrez (yellow card) 56'; Razov 66' (pen.), (yellow card) 79'; Soehn 75'; Okaroh (yellow card) 88'	Stadium: Columbus Crew Stadium; Attendance: 18,979; Referee: Ricardo Valenzuela; Assistant referees: Craig Lowry; Chip Reed; Fourth official: Douglas Palomaki
	Shootout
	Cunningham (penalty missed); John (penalty missed); Warzycha (penalty missed); West (penalty scored); Elcock (penalty missed)		(penalty missed) Nowak; (penalty missed) Dougherty; (penalty scored) Razov; (penalty scored) Kovalenko; (penalty missed) Armas

=== MLS Cup Playoffs ===
==== Conference Semifinals ====
October 17 Game 1	Columbus Crew	2-0	Tampa Bay Mutiny	Columbus, OH
3:00 PM EDT	DeBrito (yellow card) 50'; John 78', 84'	Report	Lagos (yellow card) 58'	Stadium: Columbus Crew Stadium; Attendance: 9,188; Referee: Paul Tamberino; Assistant referees: Rob Fereday; Richard Eddy; Fourth official: Noel Kenny

October 22 Game 2	Tampa Bay Mutiny	0-2	Columbus Crew	Tampa, FL
7:00 PM EDT	Valderrama (yellow card) 73'; Houser (yellow card) 78'	Report	West 23'; Clark (yellow card) 43'; Cunningham 88'	Stadium: Raymond James Stadium; Attendance: 14,392; Referee: Tim Weyland; Assistant referees: Roger Sill; Reggie Rutty; Fourth official: Noel Kenny
Note: Columbus Crew wins series 2-0, advances to Conference finals.

October 27 Game 3	Columbus Crew	If Necessary	Tampa Bay Mutiny	Columbus, OH
7:30 PM EDT				Stadium: Columbus Crew Stadium

==== Conference Finals ====
October 31 Game 1	D.C. United	2-1	Columbus Crew	Washington, D.C.
1:00 PM EST	Moreno 15'; Aunger (yellow card) 24'; Olsen 72'	Report	Yeagley (yellow card) 40'; Warzycha (yellow card) 73'; Cunningham 82'	Stadium: Robert F. Kennedy Memorial Stadium; Attendance: 14,529; Referee: Kevin Stott; Assistant referees: Nate Clement; Craig Lowry; Fourth official: Brian Hall

November 7 Game 2	Columbus Crew	5-1	D.C. United	Columbus, OH
1:00 PM EST	Clark (yellow card) 5'; Elcock 20'; Cunningham 41'; Yeagley (yellow card) 42'; John 48', 61', 84'; DeBrito (yellow card) 52'	Report	Lassiter 7'; Aunger (yellow card) 84'	Stadium: Columbus Crew Stadium; Attendance: 12,778; Referee: Brian Hall; Assistant referees: Roger Sill; Roger Itaya; Fourth official: Sandy Hunt

November 13 Game 3	D.C. United	4-0	Columbus Crew	Washington, D.C.
4:00 PM EST	Etcheverry (yellow card) 10', (goal) 86'; Moreno 17'; Lassiter 34', 52'; Pope (yellow card) 41'	Report	Warzycha (yellow card) 12'	Stadium: Robert F. Kennedy Memorial Stadium; Attendance: 21,451; Referee: Ricardo Valenzuela; Assistant referees: Tom Bobadilla; Greg Barkey; Fourth official: Noel Kenny
Note: D.C. United wins series 2-1, advances to MLS Cup 1999.

=== U.S. Open Cup ===
July 13 Third Round	Columbus Crew (MLS) (Ohio)	3-0	(North Carolina) Carolina Dynamo (PDL)	Columbus, OH
7:30 PM EDT	Elcock 36'; John 47', (yellow card) 52', (goal) 84'	Report		Stadium: Columbus Crew Stadium; Attendance: 11,257; Referee: Francisco Gomez

August 11 Quarterfinals	Los Angeles Galaxy (MLS) (California)	1-3	(Ohio) Columbus Crew (MLS)	Fullerton, CA
10:30 PM EDT	Vanney 37'; Jolley 44'; Cienfuegos (red card) 61'	Report	Brian McBride 4', 88'; Maisonneuve (yellow card) 44' (yellow-red card) 50'; Farrell 65'; Warzycha (yellow card) 87'	Stadium: Titan Stadium; Attendance: 5,478; Referee: Kevin Stott

September 1 Semifinals	Rochester Raging Rhinos (A-L) (New York (state))	3-2	(Ohio) Columbus Crew (MLS)	Virginia Beach, VA
8:30 PM EDT	Tilley 68'; Schweitzer 86'; Hardy 90'	Report	Warzycha 56'; West 77'	Stadium: Virginia Beach Sportsplex; Attendance: 2,109; Referee: Noel Kenny; Assistant referees: Craig Lowry; George Vergara; Fourth official: Steve Taylor

== Statistics ==
=== Appearances and goals ===
Under "Apps" for each section, the first number represents the number of starts, and the second number represents appearances as a substitute.

No.	Pos	Nat	Player	Total		MLS		MLS Cup Playoffs		U.S. Open Cup	
No.	Pos	Nat	Player	Apps	Goals	Apps	Goals	Apps	Goals	Apps	Goals
1	GK	(United States) USA	Juergen Sommer	0	0	0+0	0	0+0	0	0+0	0
2	DF	(United States) USA	Mike Lapper	39	1	30+1	1	5+0	0	3+0	0
3	DF	(United States) USA	Mike Clark	38	0	30+0	0	5+0	0	3+0	0
5	DF	(United States) USA	Thomas Dooley	28	1	19+6	0	0+1	0	1+1	1
6	MF	(United States) USA	Todd Yeagley	37	1	27+2	1	5+0	0	3+0	0
7	MF	(United States) USA	Matt Kmosko	14	0	9+5	0	0+0	0	0+0	0
8	FW	(Jamaica) JAM	Andy Williams	25	0	11+10	0	2+1	0	0+1	0
9	FW	(United States) USA	Billy Thompson	16	0	9+7	0	0+0	0	0+0	0
10	MF	(United States) USA	Brian Maisonneuve	32	2	28+1	2	2+0	0	1+0	0
11	FW	(United States) USA	Jeff Cunningham	35	15	15+13	12	5+0	3	2+0	0
12	MF	(United States) USA	Jason Farrell	35	1	20+8	1	0+5	0	2+0	0
13	DF	(Trinidad and Tobago) TRI	Ancil Elcock	35	5	20+8	3	3+1	1	3+0	1
14	FW	(Trinidad and Tobago) TRI	Stern John	35	25	26+2	18	5+0	5	2+0	2
15	DF	(United States) USA	Matt Chulis	4	0	3+1	0	0+0	0	0+0	0
16	MF	(United States) USA	Rob Smith	15	1	3+5	0	1+4	0	0+2	1
17	FW	(United States) USA	Brian West	30	3	13+9	1	2+3	1	3+0	1
18	GK	(United States) USA	Matt Napoleon	2	0	1+1	0	0+0	0	0+0	0
19	MF	(Poland) POL	Robert Warzycha	36	4	23+5	3	5+0	0	3+0	1
20	FW	(United States) USA	Brian McBride	32	5	25+0	5	5+0	0	2+0	0
24	MF	(United States) USA	John DeBrito	15	1	8+0	1	5+0	0	1+1	0
25	DF	(United States) USA	Ubusuku Abukusumo	6	1	1+2	0	0+0	0	1+2	1
33	GK	(United States) USA	Mark Dougherty	39	0	31+0	0	5+0	0	3+0	0
			Own goal	0	0	-	0	-	0	-	0
Players who left Columbus during the season:
33	GK	(United States) USA	Mike McGinty	0	0	0+0	0	0+0	0	0+0	0

=== Disciplinary record ===
No.	Pos.	Name	MLS		MLS Cup Playoffs		U.S. Open Cup		Total	
No.	Pos.	Name	Booked	Sent off (straight red)	Booked	Sent off (straight red)	Booked	Sent off (straight red)	Booked	Sent off (straight red)
1	GK	(United States) Juergen Sommer	0	0	0	0	0	0	0	0
2	DF	(United States) Mike Lapper	6	0	0	0	0	0	6	0
3	DF	(United States) Mike Clark	3	0	2	0	0	0	5	0
5	DF	(United States) Thomas Dooley	1	0	0	0	0	0	1	0
6	MF	(United States) Todd Yeagley	2	0	2	0	0	0	4	0
7	MF	(United States) Matt Kmosko	1	0	0	0	0	0	1	0
8	FW	(Jamaica) Andy Williams	0	0	0	0	0	0	0	0
9	FW	(United States) Billy Thompson	1	0	0	0	0	0	1	0
10	MF	(United States) Brian Maisonneuve	2	0	0	0	2	1	4	1
11	FW	(United States) Jeff Cunningham	2	0	0	0	0	0	2	0
12	MF	(United States) Jason Farrell	4	0	0	0	0	0	4	0
13	DF	(Trinidad and Tobago) Ancil Elcock	5	0	0	0	0	0	5	0
14	FW	(Trinidad and Tobago) Stern John	0	0	0	0	1	0	1	0
15	DF	(United States) Matt Chulis	1	0	0	0	0	0	1	0
16	MF	(United States) Rob Smith	1	0	0	0	0	0	1	0
17	FW	(United States) Brian West	1	0	0	0	0	0	1	0
18	GK	(United States) Matt Napoleon	0	0	0	0	0	0	0	0
19	MF	(Poland) Robert Warzycha	6	0	2	0	1	0	9	0
20	FW	(United States) Brian McBride	1	0	0	0	0	0	1	0
24	MF	(United States) John DeBrito	2	0	2	0	0	0	4	0
25	DF	(United States) Ubusuku Abukusumo	0	0	0	0	0	0	0	0
33	GK	(United States) Mark Dougherty	2	0	0	0	0	0	2	0
Players who left Columbus during the season:
33	GK	(United States) Mike McGinty	0	0	0	0	0	0	0	0

=== Clean sheets ===
No.	Name	MLS	MLS Cup Playoffs	U.S. Open Cup	Total	Games Played
1	(United States) Juergen Sommer	0	0	0	0	0
18	(United States) Matt Napoleon	0	0	0	0	2
33	(United States) Mark Dougherty	6	2	1	9	39
Players who left Columbus during the season:
33	(United States) Mike McGinty	0	0	0	0	0

== Transfers ==
=== In ===
Pos.	Player	Transferred from	Fee/notes	Date	Source
FW	(United States) Tim Sahaydak	(United States) North Carolina Tar Heels	Allocated by Major League Soccer as part of MLS Project-40.	January 15, 1999	
GK	(United States) Matt Napoleon	(United States) Miami Fusion F.C.	Traded for Tim Sahaydak	January 19, 1999	
DF	(United States) Matt Chulis	(United States) Virginia Cavaliers	Drafted in round 1 of the 1999 MLS College Draft.	February 6, 1999	
MF	(United States) Jeff Bilyk	(United States) Clemson Tigers	Drafted in round 2 of the 1999 MLS College Draft.	February 7, 1999	
DF	(United States) Randy Merkel	(United States) Maryland Terrapins	Drafted in round 3 of the 1999 MLS College Draft.	February 7, 1999	
FW	(United States) Michael Butler	(United States) Western Mass Pioneers	Drafted in round 1 of the 1999 MLS Supplemental Draft.	February 7, 1999	
FW	(United States) John DeBrito	(United States) Kansas City Wizards	Drafted in round 2 of the 1999 MLS Supplemental Draft.	February 7, 1999	
MF	(United States) Craig Yacks	(United States) Cincinnati Riverhawks	Drafted in round 3 of the 1999 MLS Supplemental Draft.	February 7, 1999	
DF	(United States) Matt Kmosko	(United States) Miami Fusion F.C.	Traded with a 2nd round pick in the 1999 MLS College Draft for a 1st round pick in the 2000 MLS SuperDraft.	February 7, 1999	
DF	(United States) Mario Gori	(United States) New England Revolution	Drafted in the 1999 MLS Waiver Draft	November 24, 1999	

=== Loan in ===
Pos.	Player	Parent club	Length/Notes	Beginning	End	Source
GK	(United States) Mike McGinty	(United States) Richmond Kickers	Short term agreement	April 5, 1999	April 8, 1999	

=== Out ===
Pos.	Player	Transferred to	Fee/notes	Date	Source
FW	(United States) Tim Sahaydak	(United States) Miami F.C.	Traded for Matt Napoleon	January 19, 1999	
DF	(United States) Randy Merkel	(United States) Raleigh Express	Placed on waivers	March 6, 1999	
MF	(United States) Craig Yacks	(United States) Cincinnati Riverhawks	Placed on waivers	March 6, 1999	
FW	(United States) Michael Butler	(United States) Western Mass Pioneers	Placed on Waivers	March 6, 1999	
MF	(United States) Jeff Bilyk	(United States) Miami Fusion F.C.	Placed on Waivers	April 1, 1999	
FW	(Trinidad and Tobago) Stern John	(United States) Nottingham Forest F.C.	Transfer, $1,600,000	November 15, 1999	
DF	(United States) Ubusuku Abukusumo	(United States) Miami Fusion F.C.	Placed on waivers	November 24, 1999	
MF	(United States) Matt Kmosko	(United States) Miami Fusion F.C.	Placed on waivers	November 24, 1999	

=== Loans out ===
Pos.	Player	Loanee club	Length/Notes	Beginning	End	Source
DF	(United States) Ubusuku Abukusumo	(United States) MLS Project-40	Multiple short term agreements.	February 10, 1999	End of Season	
GK	(United States) Matt Napoleon	(United States) MLS Project-40	Multiple short term agreements.	February 10, 1999	End of Season	
DF	(United States) Matt Chulis	(United States) MLS Project-40	Multiple short term agreements.	February 10, 1999	End of Season	
GK	(United States) Juergen Sommer	(United States) Myrtle Beach Seadawgs	Short term agreement	July 16, 1999	July 23, 1999	

=== MLS Draft picks ===
Draft picks are not automatically signed to the team roster. Only those who are signed to a contract will be listed as transfers in. The picks for the Columbus Crew are listed below:

1999 Columbus Crew College Draft Picks
Round	Pick	Player	Position	College
1	9	(United States) Matt Chulis	DF	Virginia
2	18	(United States) Jeff Bilyk	MF	Clemson
3	33	(United States) Randy Merkel	DF	Maryland

1999 Columbus Crew Supplemental Draft Picks
Round	Pick	Player	Position	College
1	9	(United States) Michael Butler	FW	UMass
2	21	(United States) John DeBrito	FW	Southern Connecticut
3	33	(United States) Craig Yacks	MF	Yale

1999 Columbus Crew Waiver Draft Picks
Round	Pick	Player	Position	Team
1	9	(United States) Mario Gori	DF	New England Revolution

== Awards ==
=== MLS Player of the Week ===
Week	Player	Opponent(s)	Link
7	(United States) Jeff Cunningham	San Jose Clash	
15	(Trinidad and Tobago) Stern John	Colorado Rapids; San Jose Clash	
25	(United States) Brian McBride	Miami Fusion F.C. Chicago Fire	

=== 1999 MLS All-Star Game ===
Starters

- DF Thomas Dooley
- FW Brian McBride

Reserves

- FW Stern John
- MF Brian Maisonneuve
- MF Robert Warzycha

=== Postseason ===
MLS Fair Play Team Award
MLS Marketing Executive of the Year

- Jamey Rootes

MLS Operations Executive of the Year

- Eddie Rockwell

=== Crew Team Awards ===
- Most Valuable Player – Mark Dougherty
- Defensive Player of the Year – Mark Dougherty
- Scoring Champion – Stern John
- Man of the Year – Mark Dougherty
- Coach's Award – Mike Lapper
