= All-time Miami Fusion roster =

This list comprises all players who have participated in at least one league match for Miami Fusion from the team's first Major League Soccer season which took place in 1998, until its final season in 2001. Players who were on the roster but never played a first team game are not listed; players who appeared for the team in other competitions (US Open Cup, CONCACAF Champions League, etc.) but never actually made an MLS appearance are noted at the bottom of the page.

A "†" denotes players who only appeared in a single match.

== A ==
- (United States) Lazo Alavanja
- (United States) Jeremy Aldrich
- (United States) Bill Andracki †
- (Palestine) Shaker Asad †

== B ==
- (United States) Keith Beach †
- (United States) Kyle Beckerman
- (United States) Jeff Bilyk
- (England) Ian Bishop
- (United States) Jason Boyce
- (United States) Scott Budnick

== C ==
- (United States) Jeff Cassar
- (United States) Judah Cooks †
- (United States) Ramiro Corrales †
- (United States) Leo Cullen

== D ==
- (United States) Brian Dunseth

== G ==
- (Brazil) Roberto Gaúcho
- (Argentina) Mario Gori
- (Netherlands) Edwin Gorter
- (United States) Henry Gutierrez

== H ==
- (United States) Jay Heaps
- (United States) Chris Henderson
- (Argentina) Marcelo Herrera
- (United States) Dusty Hudock

== K ==
- (United States) Brian Kamler
- (United States) Kris Kelderman
- (United States) Matt Kmosko
- (United States) Matt Knowles
- (United States) Cle Kooiman
- (Serbia) Alen Kozić
- (United States) Tony Kuhn

== L ==
- (United States) Garth Lagerwey
- (United States) Roy Lassiter
- (United States) Carlos Llamosa

== M ==
- (Guatemala) Martín Machón
- (United States) John Maessner
- (United States) Pete Marino
- (Jamaica) Tyrone Marshall
- (United States) Joey Martinez
- (Honduras) Saul Martínez
- (United States) Pablo Mastroeni
- (South Africa) Ivan McKinley
- (United States) Randy Merkel †

== N ==
- (United States) Matt Napoleon

== O ==
- (Nigeria) Francis Okaroh

== P ==
- (Colombia) Arley Palacios
- (United States) Carlos Parra
- (Brazil) Paulinho
- (Honduras) Alex Pineda Chacón
- (United States) Preki

== R ==
- (United States) Nick Rimando
- (Bolivia) Maurizio Rocha
- (United States) Jim Rooney

== S ==
- (United States) Tim Sahaydak
- (Colombia) Diego Serna
- (Jamaica) Gregory Simmonds
- (United States) Dan Stebbins

== T ==
- (Peru) Jerry Tamashiro
- (United States) Bryan Taylor
- (Jamaica) Roger Thomas
- (Colombia) Johnny Torres
- (Trinidad and Tobago) Mickey Trotman

== V ==
- (Colombia) Carlos Valderrama
- (United States) Nelson Vargas
- (United States) David Vaudreuil

== W ==
- (United States) Wade Webber
- (Brazil) Welton
- (Jamaica) Andy Williams
- (United States) David Winner
- (England) Ian Woan †
- (United States) Eric Wynalda

== Sources ==
- "MLS All-Time MLS Player Register". Mlsnet.com. Major League Soccer. Archived from the original on February 14, 2009.
- "MLS Number Assignments Archive".
