= List of Tampa Bay Mutiny players =

Tampa Bay Mutiny players

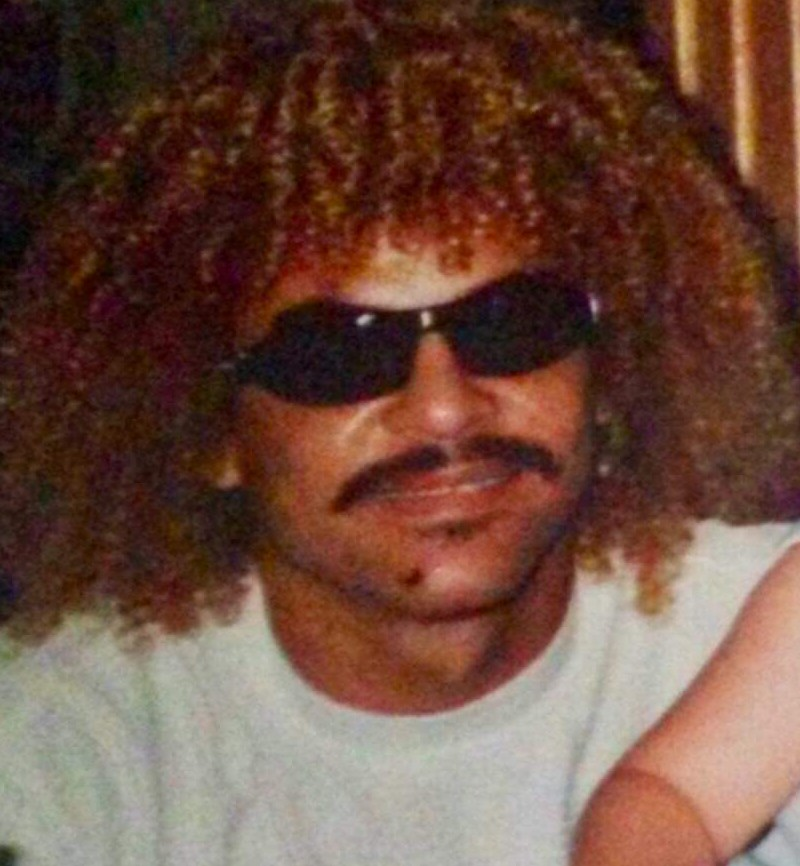
Carlos Valderrama recorded 91 assists for the Mutiny, the most of any player.

The Tampa Bay Mutiny was an American soccer club that competed in Major League Soccer (MLS), the top tier soccer league in the United States and Canada. The team played for six seasons from the inaugural MLS season of 1996 through 2001, after which the franchise went defunct.

The MLS season typically runs from February to October, and the best-performing team in the regular season is awarded the Supporters' Shield. The top teams from each conference qualify for the MLS Cup Playoffs, a postseason tournament that culminates in the MLS Cup. The Mutiny won the Supporters' Shield in the inaugural season, although this was awarded retroactively as the trophy itself was not created until 1999. In addition to league play, the Mutiny competed in the annual U.S. Open Cup tournament organized by the United States Soccer Federation.

A total of 80 players appeared in MLS matches for the club, including 7 different goalkeepers. Additionally, Matt Nyman appeared for the club in the 2001 U.S. Open Cup. In its six seasons, the club's record was 83 wins, 98 losses, and six draws over 187 games. The club ceased operations immediately after the 2001 season along with the Miami Fusion in the league's first contraction. The Mutiny had failed to attract an investor-operator, and was run by the league at a loss. Nick Sackiewicz, a former general manager for the Mutiny, blamed the lack of fan support for the failure of both teams. The league dispersed the teams' players in the 2002 MLS SuperDraft on February 10, 2002.

== Players ==
A Major League Soccer club's active roster consists of up to 30 players. All 30 players are eligible for selection to each 18-player game-day squad during the regular season and playoffs. Players who were contracted to the club but never played a regular season MLS game are not listed below.

Key

DF = Defender

MF = Midfielder

FW = Forward/striker

=== Outfield players ===
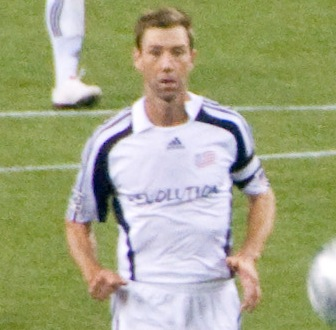
Steve Ralston appeared in 177 league games for the club, the most of any player.

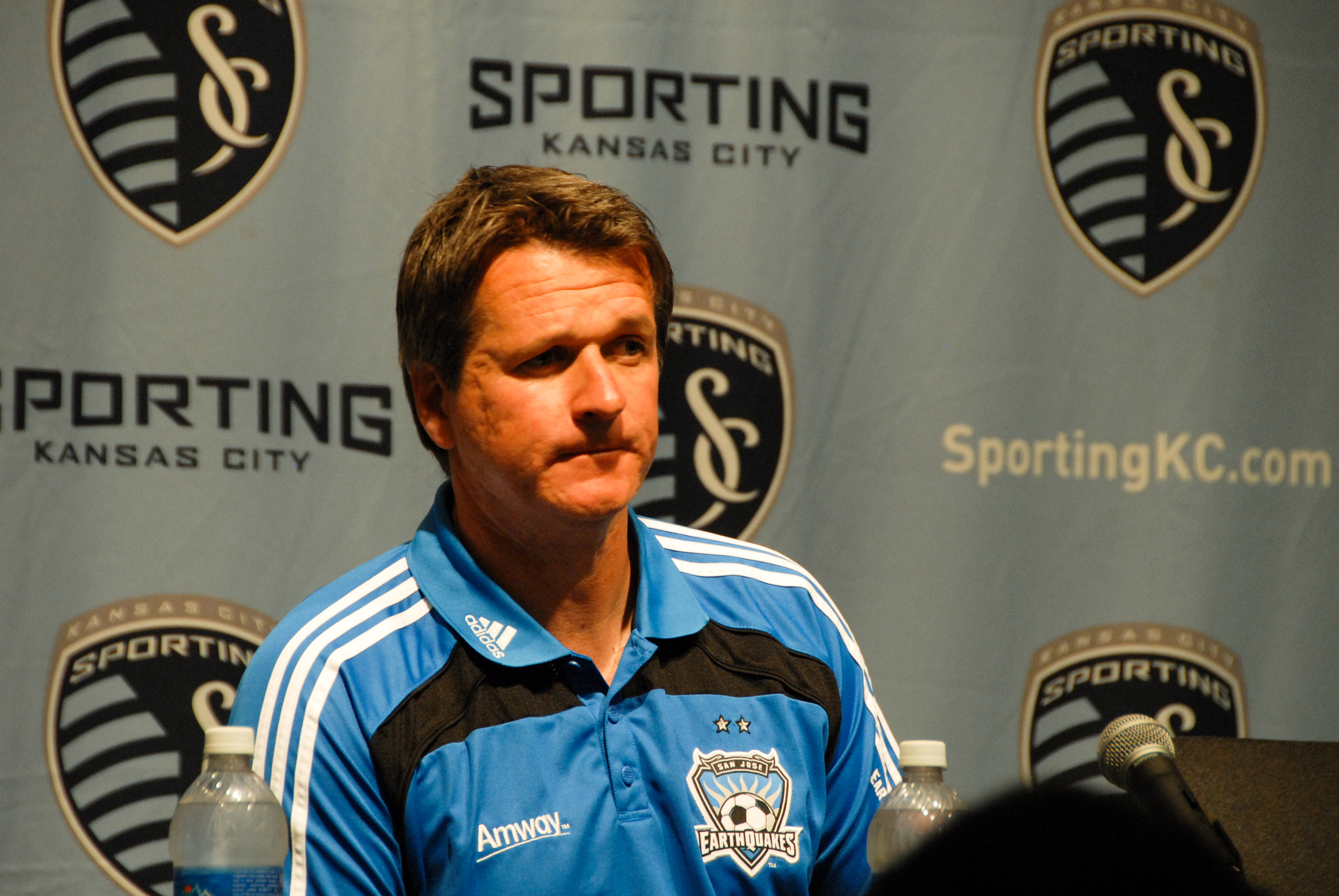
Defender Frank Yallop played in 88 league matches for the club, the third most of any player.

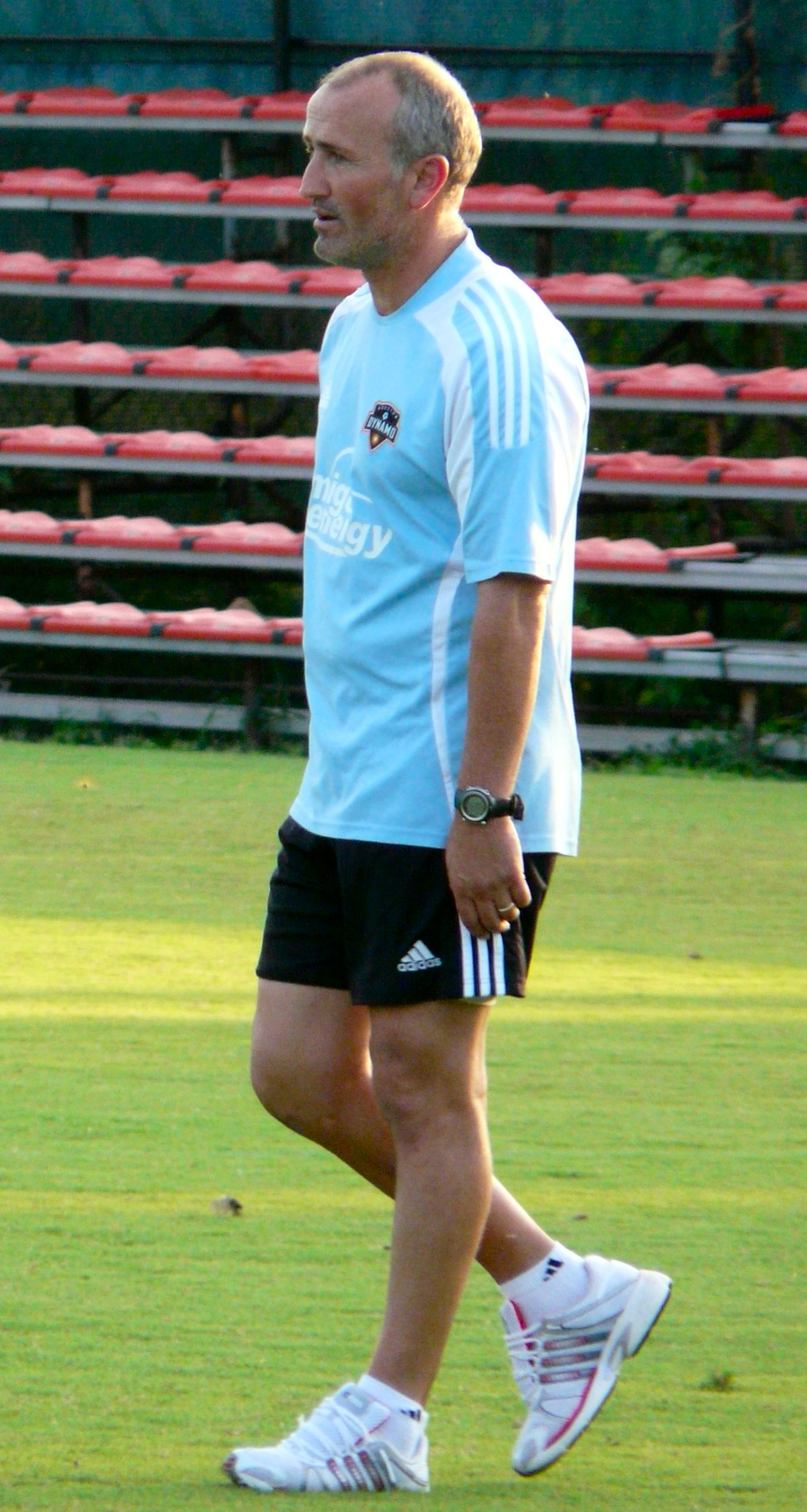
Dominic Kinnear is tied at 20 for the third-most assists in club history.

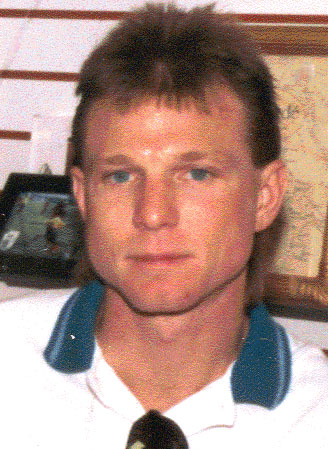
Steve Trittschuh appeared in 62 matches for the club, scoring seven goals and four assists.

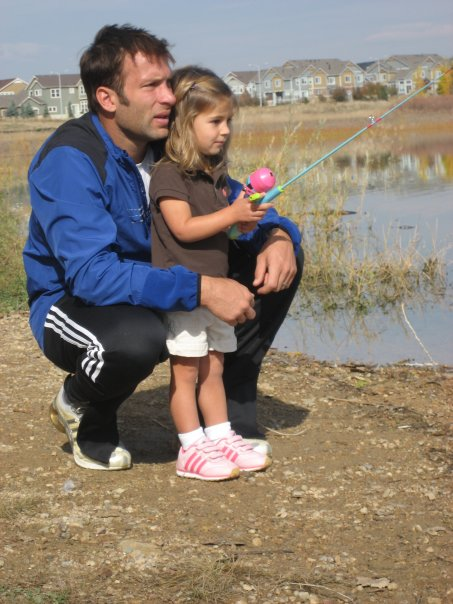
Ritchie Kotschau appeared 54 times for the club, scoring four goals and five assists.

List of Tampa Bay Mutiny outfield players (Note: All statistics are for MLS regular season games only.)
Name	Position	Country	Years	Games	Goals	Assists	Ref(s)
Joseph Addo	DF	GHA	1999–2001	60	2	2	
Cesar Alvarado	MF	USA	1999	1	0	1	
Kevin Anderson	DF	USA	2000–2001	17	3	3	
Derek Backman	MF	USA	1996–1997	28	0	0	
Kalin Bankov	MF	BUL	2000–2001	19	1	1	
Devin Barclay	FW	USA	2001	23	3	2	
João Batista	MF	SWE	1997	17	1	1	
Manuel Bucuane	FW	MOZ	2000	6	0	0	
Scott Cannon	DF	USA	2001	9	0	0	
Chiquinho Conde	FW	MOZ	1997	8	0	2	
Ali Curtis	FW	USA	2001	20	2	1	
Craig Demmin	DF	TTO	2001	19	0	1	
Eric Denton	DF	USA	2001	13	0	2	
Mamadou Diallo	FW	SEN	2000–2001	50	35	9	
Raúl Díaz Arce	FW	SLV	2000	7	4	1	
John Diffley	DF	USA	1996	13	0	0	
Paul Dougherty	FW	ENG	1998–1999	23	3	6	
Mike Duhaney	DF	USA	1997–1998	43	0	1	
Jan Eriksson	DF	SWE	1998–1999	35	2	1	
Marco Ferruzzi	MF	USA	1997	19	0	2	
Adam Frye	DF	USA	1996–1998	43	0	2	
Giuseppe Galderisi	FW	ITA	1996–1997	37	12	14	
Sam George	MF	USA	1997–1999	45	3	1	
Gilmar	MF	BRA	1997–1998	28	11	8	
Jefferson Gottardi	FW	BOL	1999	11	4	1	
Don Gramenz	DF	USA	2001	1	0	0	
Bill Harte	MF	USA	1997	4	0	0	
Frankie Hejduk	DF	USA	1996–1998	50	5	9	
Daniel Hernandez	DF	USA	1999–2000	4	0	0	
Chris Houser	DF	USA	1998–2000	36	1	5	
Goran Hunjak	MF	YUG	1996	21	2	2	
Jair	MF	CPV	2001	25	1	6	
Guillermo Jara	DF	USA	1998–1999	25	0	4	
Harut Karapetyan	FW	ARM	1999	2	0	1	
Gus Kartes	MF	USA	2001	18	0	0	
Josh Keller	MF	USA	1998–2001	83	5	8	
Brian Kelly	MF	USA	2001	2	0	0	
Dominic Kinnear	DF	USA	1998–2000	75	4	20	
Cle Kooiman	DF	USA	1996–1997	54	3	5	
Ritchie Kotschau	DF	USA	1999–2001	54	4	5	
Wojtek Krakowiak	MF	POL	2001	4	0	0	
Manny Lagos	MF	USA	1999–2000	37	12	12	
Greg Lalas	DF	USA	1996	3	0	0	
Roy Lassiter	FW	USA	1996–1998	60	37	8	
Brian Loftin	FW	USA	1998	8	0	1	
John Maessner	DF	USA	2000–2001	38	1	3	
Amos Magee	FW	USA	2000	7	0	0	
Pete Marino	FW	USA	1999	15	1	0	
Chad McCarty	DF	USA	1998–2000	58	2	5	
Ivan McKinley	DF	RSA	1996–1997	45	4	9	
R.T. Moore	DF	USA	1998–1999	19	0	0	
Alberto Munoz	MF	VEN	2001	2	0	0	
Danny Pena	DF	USA	2001	5	1	0	
Steve Pittman	DF	USA	1996	26	1	6	
Alan Prampin	FW	USA	1997–1999	59	14	14	
Eric Quill	FW	USA	1997–2001	75	8	20	
Steve Ralston	MF	USA	1996–2001	177	34	72	
Mauricio Ramos	MF	BOL	1998–1999	52	12	18	
Jorge Salcedo	MF	USA	1998–1999	31	1	6	
Paul Schneider	FW	USA	2001	1	0	0	
Alejandro Sequeira	FW	CRC	1999	11	2	1	
Diego Soñora	DF	ARG	2001	4	0	0	
Musa Shannon	MF	LBR	1997–1999	50	20	7	
Steve Trittschuh	DF	USA	1999–2001	62	7	4	
Carlos Valderrama	MF	COL	1996–1997; 1999–2001	114	12	91	
Nelson Vargas	MF	USA	1996–1997	30	2	2	
Martín Vásquez	MF	MEX	1996–1997	59	9	9	
Diego Viera	FW	URU	1996	17	5	0	
Roy Wegerle	FW	USA	1998	12	1	3	
Evans Wise	MF	TTO	1996–1997	41	2	3	
Frank Yallop	DF	CAN	1996–1998	88	1	1	
Paul Young	FW	JAM	1998	14	0	5	
Jacek Ziober	FW	POL	1998	3	0	0	

=== Goalkeepers ===
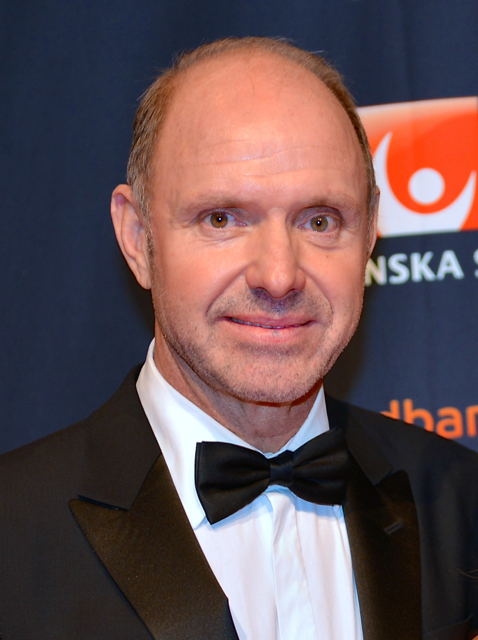
Goalkeeper Thomas Ravelli appeared in 23 games for the club and conceded 38 goals.

The Tampa Bay Mutiny had three primary goalkeepers in league play. American Mark Dougherty appeared in 54 games over the team's first two seasons, conceding 92 goals and keeping six clean sheets. He was acquired by the Columbus Crew after the 1997 season in the waiver draft, after which the club was allocated Swedish international goalkeeper Thomas Ravelli. Ravelli appeared in 23 games, which was two short of the threshold for an automatic contract renewal, and he left the club at the end of the season. From the 1999 season to the 2001 season, Scott Garlick played 74 games, conceding 121 goals and keeping 11 clean sheets. As of the 2024 season, Garlick holds the league record for the most saves in a season (184 in 2000) and the fifth-most saves in a season (152 in 1999).

{List of Tampa Bay Mutiny goalkeepers
Name	Country	Years	Games	Conceded	Shutouts (Note: A shutout occurs when a goalkeeper plays in a game without conceding a goal. This is sometimes known outside North America as a clean sheet.)	Notes
Adin Brown	USA	2001	13	33	2	
Scott Budnick	USA	1996–1997	13	19	2	
Mark Dougherty	USA	1996–1997	54	92	6	
Scott Garlick	USA	1999–2001	74	121	11	
Andy Kirk	USA	1999	6	14	0	
Doug Petras	USA	1998	12	19	1	
Thomas Ravelli	SWE	1998	23	38	2	

== Additional players ==
In addition to competing in Major League Soccer every year, the Mutiny participated in other competitions such as the Lamar Hunt U.S. Open Cup and the CONCACAF Champions League. Below is a list of players who did not appear in a league match, but played for the team in other competitions.

List of Tampa Bay Mutiny additional players
Name	Position	Country	Years	Competitions	Notes
Matt Nyman	GK	USA	2001	2001 U.S. Open Cup	
