= Manganello =

Manganello is an Italian surname. Notable people with the surname include:

- Jim Manganello (born 1976), American soccer player
- Mia Kilburg (née Manganello; born 1989), American speed skater
- Mike Manganello (born 1941), American jockey
- Timothy M. Manganello (born 1950), American businessman

== See also ==
- Manganelli
- Manganiello
