= Tony Soto =

Tony Soto may refer to:

- Tony Soto (soccer) (born 1976), American soccer defender
- Tony Soto (politician) (born 1973), Puerto Rican politician
