= Sam Franklin =

Sam Franklin may refer to:

- Sam Franklin (soccer), American soccer player
- Sam Franklin Jr. (born 1996), American football safety
