= Manganelli =

Manganelli is an Italian surname. Notable people with the surname include:

- Antonio Manganelli (1950–2013), Italian police chief
- Francesco Manganelli (1940–2022), Italian writer and politician
- Giorgio Manganelli (1922–1990), Italian journalist, writer, translator and literary critic
- Pietro Manganelli (born 1993), Italian footballer
- Roger Manganelli (born 1974), American musician

== See also ==
- Palazzo Manganelli, Catania
- Manganello
- Manganiello
