= Todd Duncan (soccer) =

American soccer player

Personal information
- Place of birth: United States
- Height: 6 ft 2 in (1.88 m)
- Position: Defender

Youth career
- 1995–1998: San Jose State Spartans

Senior career*
Years	Team	Apps	(Gls)
1999–2000	San Francisco Bay Seals	26	(1)
- * Club domestic league appearances and goals

Todd Duncan is an American retired soccer defender who spent two seasons in the USL A-League.

Duncan graduated from Bellarmine High School. He attended San Jose State University as a two-sport athlete in baseball and soccer. His soccer skills brought him to the attention of the San Jose Clash who selected him in the third round (27th overall) of the 1999 MLS College Draft. The San Francisco Bay Seals also drafted Duncan, in the 1999 USL A-League draft. Duncan signed with the Seals and played for them in 1999 and 2000.
