= Andrew Mittendorf =

American soccer player (born 1977)

Personal information
- Full name: Andrew Robert Mittendorf
- Date of birth: July 17, 1977 (age 49)
- Place of birth: Somers, New York, United States
- Height: 6 ft 0 in (1.83 m)
- Position: Forward

Youth career
- 1995–1998: Lehigh Mountain Hawks

Senior career*
Years	Team	Apps	(Gls)
1999	Hershey Wildcats	24	(4)
2000	Long Island Rough Riders	24	(2)
2001	Värtans IK		
2002	Long Island Rough Riders	18	(3)
- * Club domestic league appearances and goals

Andrew Mittendorf is an American football (soccer) player played professionally in the United States and Sweden.

== Youth ==
Mittendorf attended Lehigh University, playing on the men' soccer team from 1995 to 1998. He began his collegiate career as a defender and ended it as a high scoring forward. He was the 1997 Patriot League Player of the Year. His senior season, he led the NCAA in goals per game. In 1999, he was named to the Patriot League Men's Soccer All-Decade team.

== Professional ==
In 1999, the Colorado Rapids selected Mittendorf in the first round (eighth overall) of the 1999 MLS College Draft. The Lehigh Valley Steam also selected him in the USL A-League draft. Mittendorf signed with the Rapids who released him on March 29, 1999, during a pre-season roster reduction. He then joined the Hershey Wildcats of the A-League. In 2000, he played for the Long Island Rough Riders. In 2001, he played for Värtans IK in Sweden. In 2002, he returned to the Rough Riders and retired at the end of the season.

In 2002, Mittendorf co-founded Coastal Soccer which he sold in 2006.
