= Andrew Parrish =

American soccer player (born 1976)

Personal information
- Date of birth: March 6, 1976 (age 50)
- Place of birth: Worthington, Ohio, U.S.
- Height: 6 ft 0 in (1.83 m)
- Positions: Defender; midfielder

Youth career
- 1995–1998: Indiana Hoosiers

Senior career*
Years	Team	Apps	(Gls)
1999	Dallas Burn	0	(0)
1999–2001	Indiana Blast	73	(2)
- * Club domestic league appearances and goals

Andrew "Andy" Parrish (born 1976) is an American retired soccer player who spent three seasons in the USL A-League.

Parrish attended Indiana University, playing on the men's soccer team from 1995 to 1998. He was a two time All Big Ten defender. As a senior, Parrish was a team captain as the Hoosiers won the 1998 NCAA Division I Men's Soccer Championship. On February 6, 1999, the Dallas Burn selected Parrish in the third round (thirtieth overall) of the 1999 MLS College Draft. He played with the team throughout the entire preseason and traveled with the team to Mexico and France. He dressed for the home opener in the Cotton Bowl, wearing number 24, although he did not see any action. The Burn waived him on April 2, 1999. The Indiana Blast had also selected Parrish, in the USL A-League draft. On April 21, 1999, Parrish signed with the Blast. He was the rookie of the year for the Blast in 1999. He played three seasons with the Blast.

In 2002, he joined Wells Fargo as a financial advisor. He has been named a Five Star Wealth Advisor for "Best in Client Satisfaction" seven times. In 2012, Andy moved his practice and founded Greenway Advisors. Greenway Advisors focuses serving professionals and business owners.
