= 1999 MLS College Draft =

College draft for soccer teams

The 1999 Major League Soccer College Draft was held on February 6 and 7, 1999 in Fort Lauderdale, Florida. The first round of the draft took place on February 6 with the second and third rounds on February 7. The College Draft was followed by the 1999 MLS Supplemental Draft later on February 7.

== Round 1 ==
Pick #	MLS team	Player	Position	Affiliation
1	D.C. United (Note: #1: New England Revolution → MetroStars → D.C. United. 4 February 1998: As third part of three-team trade with New England, D.C. United acquired this first-round selection from MetroStars to fulfill "future considerations" in the Raul Diaz Arce trade. 4 February 1998: As second part of three-team trade with D.C. United, MetroStars acquired this first-round selection and defender Alexi Lalas from New England Revolution in exchange for Raul Diaz Arce.)	Jason Moore	M	University of Virginia
2	Miami Fusion (Note: #2: Kansas City Wizards → Miami Fusion. 6 February 1999: Miami Fusion acquired this first-round selection from Kansas City Wizards in exchange for a first-round pick (#5) in the 1999 MLS College Draft and a first-round pick in the 2000 MLS SuperDraft.)	Jay Heaps	M	Duke University
3	San Jose Clash	Richard Mulrooney	F	Creighton University
4	Dallas Burn (Note: #4: Tampa Bay Mutiny → Chicago Fire → Dallas Burn. 7 February 1999: Dallas Burn acquired this first-round pick and the #12 selection in the 1999 College Draft from Chicago Fire in exchange for midfielder Dema Kovalenko. On 29 June 1998, Chicago had acquired this first-round pick and midfielder Josh Keller from Tampa Bay Mutiny in exchange for defender Jorge Salcedo.)	Lazo Alavanja	M	Indiana University
5	Kansas City Wizards (Note: #5: Miami Fusion → Kansas City Wizards. 6 February 1999: Kansas City Wizards acquired this first-round pick and a first-round pick in the 2000 MLS SuperDraft from Miami Fusion in exchange for a first-round selection (#2) in the 1999 MLS College Draft.)	Chris Brown	F	University of Portland
6	Dallas Burn	Bobby Rhine	F	University of Connecticut
7	MetroStars	John Wolyniec	F	Fordham University
8	Colorado Rapids	Andrew Mittendorf	F	Lehigh University
9	Columbus Crew	Matt Chulis	D	University of Virginia
10	Los Angeles Galaxy	Tony Soto	D	Southern Methodist University
11	Chicago Fire (Note: #11: D.C. United → Chicago Fire. 6 January 1998: Chicago Fire acquired this first-round pick, a second-round pick (#23) in the 1999 College Draft (both picks originally "future considerations"), and midfielder Jesse Marsch from D.C. United in exchange for a second-round selection (#14) in the 1998 MLS College Draft and forward A.J. Wood.)	Evan Whitfield	D	Duke University
12	Dallas Burn (Note: #12: Chicago Fire → Dallas Burn. 7 February 1999: Dallas Burn acquired this first-round pick and the #4 selection in the 1999 College Draft from Chicago Fire in exchange for midfielder Dema Kovalenko.)	Paul Broome	M	Southern Methodist University

== Round 2 ==
Pick #	MLS team	Player	Position	Affiliation
13	Los Angeles Galaxy (Note: #13: New England Revolution → Los Angeles Galaxy. 5 January 1999: Los Angeles Galaxy acquired this second-round selection and a first-round pick in the 1999 MLS Supplemental Draft from New England Revolution in exchange for a defender Dan Calichman.)	Seth George	F	UCLA
14	Kansas City Wizards	John Wilson	D	Clemson University
15	San Jose Clash	Wojtek Krakowiak	F	Clemson University
16	MetroStars (Note: #16: Tampa Bay Mutiny → New England Revolution → MetroStars. 7 February 1999: MetroStars acquired this second-round selection from New England Revolution in exchange for two second round selections in the 2000 MLS SuperDraft. Earlier the same day, New England had acquired this second-round pick from Tampa Bay Mutiny in exchange for a fifth-round pick in the 2000 MLS SuperDraft (originally a second-round selection in the canceled 2000 MLS Supplemental Draft).)	Kevin Knight	M	James Madison University
17	D.C. United (Note: #17: Miami Fusion → D.C. United. 5 December 1998: D.C. United acquired this second-round pick and a first-round selection in the 2000 MLS SuperDraft from Miami Fusion in exchange for a second-round pick (#19) in the 1999 MLS College Draft and midfielder Mario Gori.)	Keith Beach	M	University of Maryland
18	Columbus Crew (Note: #18: Dallas Burn → Miami Fusion → Columbus Crew. 6 February 1999: Columbus Crew acquired this second-round pick and defender Matt Kmosko from Miami Fusion in exchange for a first-round selection in the 2000 MLS SuperDraft. On Date Needed, Miami had acquired this second-round selection from Dallas Burn in exchange for a third-round pick (#25) in the 1998 MLS College Draft. More information needed.)	Jeff Bilyk	M	Clemson University
19	Miami Fusion (Note: #19: MetroStars → D.C. United → Miami Fusion. 5 December 1998: Miami Fusion acquired this second-round pick and Mario Gori from D.C. United in exchange for a second-round pick (#17) in the 1999 MLS College Draft and a first-round pick in the 2000 MLS SuperDraft (originally a first-round selection in the canceled 2000 MLS College Draft). 4 February 1998: As first part of three-team trade with New England Revolution, D.C. United acquired this second-round pick and future considerations (New England's first-round pick (#1) in the 1999 MLS College Draft) from MetroStars in exchange for Raul Diaz Arce.)	Jeremy Aldrich	D	Butler University
20	Colorado Rapids	Tom Poltl	M	UCLA
21	San Jose Clash (Note: #21: Columbus Crew → D.C. United → San Jose Clash. 28 January 1999: San Jose Clash acquired this second-round pick and a first-round selection in the 1999 MLS Supplemental Draft from D.C. United in exchange for financial considerations. On Date Needed, D.C. had acquired this second-round selection from Columbus Crew in exchange for a second-round pick (#24) in the 1998 MLS College Draft. More information needed.)	Jamie Clark	D	Stanford University
22	Los Angeles Galaxy	Sam Franklin	M	University of Virginia
23	Chicago Fire (Note: #23: D.C. United → Chicago Fire. 6 January 1998: Chicago Fire acquired this second-round pick, a first-round pick (#11) in the 1999 College Draft (both picks originally "future considerations"), and midfielder Jesse Marsch from D.C. United in exchange for a second-round selection (#14) in the 1998 MLS College Draft and forward A.J. Wood.)	Greg Sutton	GK	St. Lawrence University
24	Dallas Burn (Note: '#24: Pick originally belonged to Chicago Fire. → Dallas Burn.)	Darren Warham	D	Lynn University

== Round 3 ==
Pick #	MLS team	Player	Position	Affiliation
25	New England Revolution	Leighton O'Brien	M	University of San Diego
26	Kansas City Wizards	Kevin Kalish	D	St. Louis University
27	San Jose Clash	Todd Duncan	D	San Jose State University
28	D.C. United (Note: #28: Tampa Bay Mutiny → D.C. United. 19 January 1999: D.C. United acquired this third-round selection and a first-round pick (#4) in the 1999 MLS Supplemental Draft from Tampa Bay Mutiny in exchange for goalkeeper Scott Garlick.)	David Hayes	F	Wingate University
29	MetroStars (Note: #29: Miami Fusion → MetroStars. 30 June 1998: MetroStars acquired this third-round selection from Miami Fusion in exchange for defender Matt Knowles.)	Jim Manganello	M	Wheaton College
30	Dallas Burn	Andrew Parrish	D	Indiana University
31	MetroStars	Eric Kvello	F	Georgetown University
32	Colorado Rapids	Bobby Meyer	D	Dartmouth College
33	Columbus Crew	Randy Merkel	D	University of Maryland
34	Los Angeles Galaxy	PASS		
35	Dallas Burn (Note: #35: D.C. United → Dallas Burn. 18 January 1999: Dallas Burn acquired this third-round selection and a second-round pick in the 1999 MLS Supplemental Draft from D.C. United in exchange for defender Brian Bates.)	Aaron Lewis	M	Western Baptist College
36	Chicago Fire	Stefani Miglioranzi	M	St. John's University

== Unresolved 1999 College Draft Trades ==
- 29 March 1997: Kansas City Wizards acquired D John Diffley from the Tampa Bay Mutiny for a conditional third-round draft pick in 1999 or 2000.
- 5 February 1998: New England Revolution acquired F Raul Diaz Arce from D.C. United; sent Alexi Lalas and a second-round selection in the 1999 MLS College Draft to the New York/New Jersey MetroStars; New York/New Jersey MetroStars sent second-round selection in the 1999 MLS College Draft and future considerations to D.C. United.
- 19 March 1998: Dallas Burn acquired a conditional selection in the 1999 MLS College Draft from Chicago Fire in exchange for defender Zak Ibsen. This may be pick #24.
