= Bobby Meyer =

American soccer player

Personal information
- Full name: Robert Meyer
- Place of birth: Long Island, New York, U.S.
- Height: 6 ft 0 in (1.83 m)
- Position: Defender

Youth career
- 1995–1998: Dartmouth Big Green

Senior career*
Years	Team	Apps	(Gls)
1999	Colorado Rapids	0	(0)
1999–2000	Pittsburgh Riverhounds	29	(1)
2002–2003	Cincinnati Riverhawks	33	(0)
- * Club domestic league appearances and goals

Robert "Bobby" Meyer is an American retired soccer defender who played professionally in the USL A-League.

Meyer attended Dartmouth College, playing for the Mean Green from 1995 to 1998. He was a 1998 Third Team All American. On February 7, 1999, the Colorado Rapids selected Meyer in the third round (thirty-second overall) of the 1999 MLS College Draft. The Rapids waived Meyer on March 25, 1999. Meyer then signed with the Pittsburgh Riverhounds who had selected him in the second round of the 1999 USL draft. He spent two seasons in Pittsburgh, then sat out the 2001 season. He signed with the Cincinnati Riverhawks in March 2002. He spent a season and a half with the Riverhawks. On June 25, 2003, the Riverhawks cancelled his contract “by mutual consent”.
