= Tony Soto (soccer) =

American soccer player

Personal information
- Date of birth: October 1, 1976 (age 50)
- Place of birth: Dallas, Texas, United States
- Height: 6 ft 0 in (1.83 m)
- Position: Defender

College career
Years	Team	Apps	(Gls)
1995–1996	South Carolina Gamecocks		
1997–1998	SMU Mustangs		

Senior career*
Years	Team	Apps	(Gls)
1999	Los Angeles Galaxy	0	(0)
1999	→ MLS Pro 40 (loan)	10	(1)
1999	Kansas City Wizards	4	(0)
2000	Atlanta Silverbacks	25	(1)
2001	Connecticut Wolves	21	(0)

International career
1992	US U-17		
1994	US U-20		
1996	US U-23		
- * Club domestic league appearances and goals

Tony Soto is a retired American soccer defender who spent one season in Major League Soccer. He was a member of the United States men's national under-17 soccer team which went to the quarterfinals of the 1993 FIFA U-17 World Championship.

== Youth ==
Antonio "Tony" Soto played for the Dallas Gunners Soccer Club, which subsequently changed their name to the Dallas Inter as a youth, He was the first person from the rough Dallas suburb of North Oak Cliff. He graduated from Duncanville High School (Duncanville, TX) where the team was ranked #4 nationally in his 1995 senior year. He originally intended on attending UCLA, Clemson, Duke, Stanford, Ohio State, Indiana University, and the University of Miami. Antonio "Tony" Soto had always wanted and intended to attend UCLA, which he'd always held as a goal, and was a dream of his mothers as well. After negotiations went south with UCLA his collegiate career landed him at the University of South Carolina in 1995. As Antonio "Tony" Soto began to make his usual mark with the South Carolina squat, Mark Berson, then the coach of the University of South Carolina, asked US Olympic Team Head Coach Bruce Arena to take a look at this proven, dedicated, and a solid young player. At this time, almost the entire US National Olympic Team were around the age of 23, Antonio "Tony" Soto achieved the unprecedented honor of making the US Men's Olympic National Team aged 17, easily six junior to the rest of the nationally chosen squad. At the University of South Carolina, Antonio "Tony" Soto debuted as a starter and a standout player on the team and helped lead it to a number one ranking, which carried over to 1996, where yet again, they were the number one ranked collegiate team, where he was a two time All-American Academia. He then transferred to Southern Methodist University where he was a 1997 Third Team All American soccer player.

 Concurrently, Antonio "Tony" Soto was being heavily pursued by the Dallas Burn to bypass his senior year and go pro during his junior year, leave college early. Out of respect for his mother, who had always had high aspirations for her son, and his burning drive to excel and dominate,   Antonio "Tony" Soto chose to not only play out his senior year with the SMU Mustangs, finishing out his education, while at the same time driving the squad of SEVEN starting freshmen into becoming an unstoppable force, and as came to be expected,  becoming the number one dominating collegiate team in the nation.

After Antonio "Tony" Soto finished his senior year, he was being courted by over five different teams, and he finally settled on the LA Galaxy, with his former teammate Dannielle Hernandez, being drafted in the MLS top 10 nationwide.

== Professional ==
On February 7, 1999, the Los Angeles Galaxy selected Antonio "Tony" Soto in the first round of the 1999 MLS College Draft. When he became one of the top 10 incoming collegiate players picked up by MLS After spending a year and a half with the Los Angeles Galaxy, Antonio "Tony" Soto turned down going to UCLA to the Kansas City Wizards early in the season. The Wizards waived him on November 25, 1999. In 2000, Soto played for the Atlanta Silverbacks of the USL A-League. In 2001, he moved to the Connecticut Wolves.

== International ==
Soto played four games for the United States men's national under-17 soccer team which went to the quarterfinals of the 1993 FIFA U-17 World Championship. In 1994, he played for the United States men's national under-20 soccer team and in 1997, he saw time with the United States men's national under-23 soccer team
