= Matt Napoleon =

American soccer player

Personal information
- Date of birth: August 18, 1977 (age 49)
- Place of birth: Philadelphia, Pennsylvania, U.S.
- Height: 6 ft 1 in (1.85 m)
- Position: Goalkeeper

Youth career
- 1995–1997: Columbia Lions

Senior career*
Years	Team	Apps	(Gls)
1998	Miami Fusion	4	(0)
1998	→ MLS Pro-40 (loan)	6	(0)
1999–2000	Columbus Crew	10	(0)
2000	→ MLS Pro-40 (loan)	6	(0)
2001–2002	Portland Timbers	54	(0)
2001	→ Dallas Burn (loan)	0	(0)
2002	→ Colorado Rapids (loan)	0	(0)
2003	Charlotte Eagles	1	(0)

International career
1997	United States U20	3	(0)
1998–1999	United States U23		(0)

Managerial career
- 2001: Portland State Vikings (assistant)
- * Club domestic league appearances and goals

Matt Napoleon (born August 18, 1977) is an American retired soccer goalkeeper who played professionally in Major League Soccer and the USL A-League. He was a member of the United States men's national under-20 soccer team at the 1997 FIFA World Youth Championship.

== Player ==
=== Youth ===
Growing up, Napoleon played for the FC Delco youth club and graduated from Neshaminy High School in 1995. He attended Columbia University, playing on the men's soccer team for three seasons.

=== Professional ===
On January 15, 1998, Napoleon signed a professional contract with MLS Project 40. The league placed him with the Miami Fusion. He played four games for the Fusion in 1998 in addition to playing for the Project 40 team which competed in the USISL A-League. On January 19, 1999, the Fusion traded Napoleon to the Columbus Crew for Tim Sahaydak. Napoleon spent two seasons with the Crew before moving to the Colorado Rapids. On April 14, 2001, the Rapids waived Napoleon. In May 2001, he signed with the Portland Timbers of the USL A-League. He went on loan to the Dallas Burn during the 2001 season. In 2002, Napoleon remained with the Timbers, going on loan to the Dallas Burn on July 13, 2002, for a U.S. Open Cup game. In August and September 2002, he went repeatedly on loan to the Colorado Rapids, but never entered a league game. Napoleon retired in January 2003. However, he came out of retirement and made an appearance for the Charlotte Eagles in 2003 before retiring again.

=== International ===
In 1997, Napoleon earned three caps with the United States men's national under-20 soccer team. He played another nine non-international games with the U-20 team as it prepared for the 1997 FIFA World Youth Championship. In that tournament, Napoleon backed up Andy Kirk. In 1998 and 1999, Napoleon played for the United States men's national under-23 soccer team as it prepared for the 2000 Summer Olympics. Napoleon was an unused alternate for the team at the Olympics.

== Coach ==
While with the Portland Timbers, Napoleon also served as an assistant coach with the Portland State University women's soccer team.
