= Darren Warham =

English footballer

Personal information
- Date of birth: 27 August 1972 (age 54)
- Place of birth: Ashington, England
- Position: Midfielder

Youth career
- 1995–1998: Lynn University

Senior career*
Years	Team	Apps	(Gls)
1999	Raleigh Express	25	(0)
2000–2001	Charleston Battery	44	(0)
2002	Hampton Roads Mariners	25	(0)
2006	Virginia Beach Submariners	2	(0)
Total		96	(0)

Managerial career
- 2006: Virginia Beach Submariners (assistant)
- * Club domestic league appearances and goals

Darren Warham is an English retired football (soccer) player who spent his professional career in the USL A-League.

== Youth ==
Warham attended Lynn University where he was a 1996 Second Team and 1997 and 1998 First Team All American soccer player. He was three-time All South and the 1998 Sunshine State Conference Player of the Year. In 2006, Lynn University inducted Warham into its athletic Hall of Fame.

== Professional ==
On 6 February 1999, the Dallas Burn selected Warham in the second round (twenty-fourth overall) of the 1999 MLS College Draft. Warham signed with the Raleigh Express of the USL A-League. The Charleston Battery purchased Warham's contract from the Express before the 2000 season. Warham spent the 2000 and 2001 seasons in Charleston. In 2002, Warham spent one season with the Hampton Roads Mariners. In 2006, he played two games as a player-assistant coach with the Virginia Beach Submariners

== Coaching career ==
2002–present

VA ODP Asst. Coach - Boys

VA ODP Head Coach- Boys

Region 1 ODP Asst. Coach- Boys

Virginia Rush Coach

Virginia Rush DOC- Boys Junior

Virginia Rush Asst. DOC- US Academy

Virginia Rush Asst. DOC- ECNL

VA Premier League President

Virginia Beach Submariners Asst. Coach

Lonestar SC- Asst. DOC ENCL

Lonestar SC- DOC - ECNL

Lonestar SC- Asst. DOC- Boys TEPAL & Champions League
