= Eric Kvello =

American soccer player

Personal information
- Date of birth: February 12, 1977 (age 49)
- Place of birth: Houston, Texas, U.S.
- Height: 6 ft 1 in (1.85 m)
- Position: Striker

Youth career
- 1995–1998: Georgetown Hoyas

Senior career*
Years	Team	Apps	(Gls)
1999	MetroStars	4	(0)
1999–2000	Hershey Wildcats	16	(1)
2000	Connecticut Wolves	7	(0)
2000–2002	Harrisburg Heat (indoor)	75	(20)
2001	Reading Rage	17	(4)
2001	Hershey Wildcats	5	(5)
2002	Carolina Dynamo	22	(3)
2002–2003	Cleveland Force (indoor)	21	(4)
- * Club domestic league appearances and goals

Eric Kvello (born February 12, 1977) is an American retired professional soccer player.

Kvello grew up in Houston, Texas, where he played for the Houston Texans Soccer Club. In college, he played for Georgetown Hoyas in 1995, 1996, 1997 and 1998. In February 1999, the Hershey Wildcats selected Kvello in the second round of the USL A-League. The MetroStars also selected him in the third round of the 1999 MLS College Draft. Kvello signed with the MetroStars where he played two games. He was released midway through the season. He then joined the Hershey Wildcats for the remainder of the 1999 season and the first eleven games of the 2000 season. He then finished the season with the Connecticut Wolves. In October 2000, Kvello signed with the Harrisburg Heat of the National Professional Soccer League. In 2001, Kvello spent time with both the Wildcats and the Reading Rage. In 2002, Kvello played for the Carolina Dynamo. In September 2002, the Heat traded Kvello, Steve Klein and Bernie Lilavois to the Cleveland Force in a complicated three-team trade deal. Kvello later played for the amateur FC Lokomotiv in the Houston Football Association Championship Division.

== Statistics ==
Club performance			League		Cup		League Cup		Continental		Total	
Season	Club	League	Apps	Goals	Apps	Goals	Apps	Goals	Apps	Goals	Apps	Goals
USA			League		Open Cup		League Cup		North America		Total	
1999	MetroStars	MLS	2	0	2	0	0	0	0	0	4	0
Career total			2	0	2	0	0	0	0	0	4	0
