= Manganiello =

Manganiello (Italian: [maŋɡaˈnjɛllo], Neapolitan: [maŋɡaˈnjellə]) is an Italian surname. Notable people with the surname include:

- Aaron Manganiello (1943–2009), American far-left militant
- Joe Manganiello (born 1976), American actor
- Teresa Manganiello (1849–1876), Italian secular nun

== See also ==
- Manganello
- Manganelli
