= Matt Nyman =

American soccer player

Personal information
- Date of birth: September 16, 1976 (age 50)
- Place of birth: Middletown, Connecticut, U.S.
- Position: Goalkeeper

Senior career*
Years	Team	Apps	(Gls)
1999–2001	Tampa Bay Mutiny	0	(0)
1999	→ MLS Pro-40 (loan)	7	(0)
2000	→ MLS Pro-40 (loan)	18	(1)
Total		25	(1)
- * Club domestic league appearances and goals

Matt Nyman (born September 16, 1976) is an American former soccer player who played for the Tampa Bay Mutiny in the MLS and the MLS Pro-40 in the A-League.

== Career statistics ==
=== Club ===
Club	Season	League			Cup		Other		Total	
Club	Season	Division	Apps	Goals	Apps	Goals	Apps	Goals	Apps	Goals
Tampa Bay Mutiny	1999	MLS	0	0	0	0	0	0	0	0
Tampa Bay Mutiny	2000	MLS	0	0	0	0	0	0	0	0
Tampa Bay Mutiny	2001	MLS	0	0	0	0	0	0	0	0
Tampa Bay Mutiny	Total		0	0	0	0	0	0	0	0
MLS Pro-40 (loan)	1999	USL A-League	7	0	0	0	0	0	7	0
MLS Pro-40 (loan)	2000	USL A-League	18	1	0	0	0	0	18	1
MLS Pro-40 (loan)	Total		25	1	0	0	0	0	25	1
Career total			25	1	0	0	0	0	25	1
