= Alen Kozić =

American soccer player (born 1976)

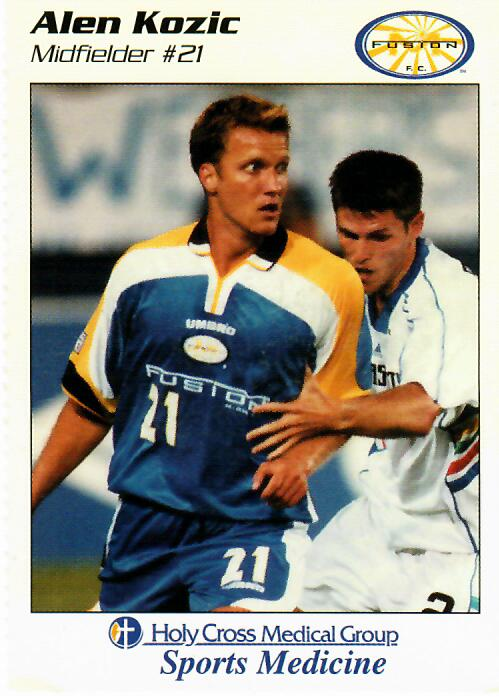

Personal information
- Date of birth: 27 September 1976 (age 50)
- Place of birth: Belgrade, SFR Yugoslavia
- Height: 6 ft 0 in (1.83 m)
- Position: Midfielder

Youth career
- 1993: Temple Terrace Spirit

College career
Years	Team	Apps	(Gls)
1995–1997	FIU Panthers	74	(24)

Senior career*
Years	Team	Apps	(Gls)
1998–2000	Miami Fusion	6	(0)
1998–1999	MLS Project 40	18	(3)
2000	NK Istra 1961		
2002–2003	1. FC Union Solingen	13	(0)
- * Club domestic league appearances and goals

Alen Kozić (born 27 September 1976) is an American former soccer player. He played college soccer for the FIU Panthers before playing professionally for several years.

== Youth career ==
Kozić is the son of former professional soccer player Refik Kozić. In 1993, playing for Temple Terrace Spirit, he scored the winning goal in the final of the U17 US Youth Soccer National Championships in Phoenix, Arizona.

== High School ==
Kozić attended Berkeley Preparatory School for three years, leading the school's soccer team to three state championships in a row in 1993, 1994 and 1995. In his senior year, he was voted high school all American. Also, was voted the Tampa Bay Times player of the decade for the 90's for Hillsborough county.

In March 1994, Kozić was called into the U17 Southeast USA regional team to compete in a tournament in France where they faced up against youth setups from Ajax of Holland, Standard Leige of Belgium, and Monaco and Paris St. Germain of France.

Also in 1994 he had trial at Primera División club Real Oviedo.

== College career ==
Kozić played for Florida International University's FIU Panthers from 1995 to 1997. In 1996, as a sophomore, he led FIU to the College Cup losing in the final to St Johns. In his sophomore and junior years, he achieved a place in the NCAA Division I Men's Soccer All-American First Team. As a junior he finished as a runner up for the Hermann Trophy, as the best college player 1997. Kozić was inducted into the FIU Sports Hall of Fame. In two years at FIU, Kozić tallied 24 goals and 26 assists in 74 games, making him the eighth all-time leader in goals and assists for FIU.

== Professional career ==
In December 1997 through January 1998, Alen Kozic had a trial with SV Wüstenrot Salzburg.

In 1998 Kozic signed for Major League Soccer side Miami Fusion. He made his debut for the club in a friendly for Miami Fusion against the Honduras national team and scored the opening goal in a 4–2 win. He made his starting debut on 31 May 1998, against Dallas Burn. Days later, he suffered an anterior cruciate ligament tear in training. In 1999 he started in two matches for Miami Fusion: in May against Dallas Burn and in June against D.C. United. He totalled 18 games played for the MLS Project 40 A-League team composed of the best young MLS players.

From 2000 Kozic spent one year with Croatian club NK Istra 1961.

In the 2002–03 season, Kozic played 13 games for German club 1. FC Union Solingen in the Oberliga Nordrhein.

Kozic had an unsuccessful trial at Major League Soccer side D.C. United in April 2003.
