= Michael Butler (footballer) =

Liberian footballer

Personal information
- Full name: Michael Butler
- Date of birth: 5 January 1976 (age 50)
- Place of birth: Monrovia, Liberia
- Height: 1.77 m (5 ft 10 in)
- Position: Striker

Youth career
- UMass Minutemen

Senior career*
Years	Team	Apps	(Gls)
1998	Western Mass Pioneers		(15)
1999	Pittsburgh Riverhounds	28	(11)
1999–2000	Lechia Gdańsk	1	(0)
2000	Pittsburgh Riverhounds	9	(3)
2000	Hershey Wildcats	11	(1)
2001–2002	Long Island Rough Riders	18	(3)
2001	→ MetroStars (loan)	1	(1)
2004	Long Island Rough Riders	2	(0)
- * Club domestic league appearances and goals

Michael Butler (born 5 January 1976) is a Liberian retired professional footballer.

== Player ==
=== Youth ===
Butler was inducted in the Springfield Massachusetts High School Sports Hall of Fame in November 2009. He was one of 100 inaugural inductees selected from the 100 years spanning from 1900–2000. During his four years at the University of Massachusetts Amherst he held three separate career records in goals scored, assists and overall points.

=== Professional ===
In 1998, Butler turned professional with the Western Mass Pioneers. He tied Luis Orellano for the league lead in goals with fifteen. Butler was the USISL D-3 Pro League Rookie of the Year. In 1999, he moved to the Pittsburgh Riverhounds. Butler was drafted by Columbus Crew in the first round of the 1999 MLS Supplemental Draft with the 9th pick. In 2000, he played for the Hershey Wildcats. In 2001, he was loaned from Long Island Rough Riders to MetroStars who were in desperate need of strikers due to injuries. In his only match for the Metros, Butler scored the game winner off a Daniel Hernández cross in extra time against Tampa Bay.

== Management ==
After assistant coaching stints at American International College, SUNY Purchase, and George Washington University, Butler currently serves as head coach for the Women's team at Berkeley College. He is also the Director of Soccer Operations at 5 Star Soccer Academy based in Long Island, New York and the Technical Director for the Girls Program at Downtown United Soccer Club (DUSC) based in Manhattan. Butler currently serves on the National training staff for the United States Soccer Foundation based out of Washington, D.C.
