= Jim Manganello =

American soccer player

Personal information
- Full name: James Manganello
- Date of birth: December 8, 1976 (age 49)
- Place of birth: Duxbury, Massachusetts, U.S.
- Height: 5 ft 10 in (1.78 m)
- Position: Midfielder

Youth career
- 1995–1998: Wheaton College

Senior career*
Years	Team	Apps	(Gls)
1999	MetroStars	0	(0)
2000–2003	Boston Bulldogs		
2000	→ Cape Cod Crusaders (loan)	3	(1)
- * Club domestic league appearances and goals

James “Jim” Manganello is an American retired soccer midfielder who spent four seasons with the Boston Bulldogs in the USL A-League.

== Youth ==
Manganello attended Wheaton College where he was a 1997 Third Team and a 1998 Second Team All American soccer player.

== Professional ==
On February 6, 1999, the MetroStars selected Manganello in the third round (twenty-ninth overall) of the 1999 MLS College Draft. He was injured early in the season. The MetroStars released him on June 29, 1999. In 2000, Manganello played for the Boston Bulldogs of the USL A-League. He played for the Bulldogs through 2003.
