= Ancil Elcock =

Trinidadian footballer (born 1969)

Personal information
- Date of birth: 17 March 1969 (age 57)
- Place of birth: Port of Spain, Trinidad and Tobago
- Height: 1.80 m (5 ft 11 in)
- Position: Defender

Senior career*
Years	Team	Apps	(Gls)
- St. Augustine FC
- Malta Carib Alcons
1997–2001	Columbus Crew	130	(7)
- San Juan Jabloteh
- North East Stars
- Tobago United

International career
1994–2004	Trinidad and Tobago	69	(0)
- * Club domestic league appearances and goals

Ancil Elcock (born 17 March 1969) is a Trinidadian former professional footballer. He played for Major League Soccer team Columbus Crew between 1997 and 2001 (130 games and 7 goals), and for Tobago United. He got 69 caps for the Trinidad and Tobago national team between 1994 and 2004. Ancil Elcock became infamous for fracturing Mexican forward Cuauhtémoc Blanco in a World Cup qualification match.

Elcock is the older cousin of Stern John, whom he recruited to the Columbus Crew while tenured there.

== Blanco's Injury ==
On 8 October 2000, Trinidad and Tobago contested a World Cup qualification match against Mexico. The match was played in Mexico City at the Estadio Azteca and the referee was Carlos Batres Gonzalez. In the 72nd minute, Elcock slide-tackled Cuauhtémoc Blanco hitting him on the knee as he received the ball in the penalty area. Referee Gonzalez determined the tackle to be of excessive force and called for a penalty and ejected Elcock by showing him a direct red card, even though Elcock had previously received a yellow in the game. The penalty was taken and scored by Víctor Ruiz resulting in the final score of the game 7–0 in favor of Mexico.
