= Mike McGinty =

American retired soccer player (born 1971)

Personal information
- Full name: Michael McGinty
- Date of birth: August 17, 1971 (age 55)
- Place of birth: Seoul, South Korea
- Height: 6 ft 2 in (1.88 m)
- Position: Goalkeeper

College career
| Years | Team | Apps | (Gls) |
| 1991–1994 | Wake Forest Demon Deacons | ? | (0) |

Senior career*
| Years | Team | Apps | (Gls) |
| 1995–1996 | Greensboro Dynamo | ? | (0) |
| 1997 | Richmond Kickers | ? | (0) |
| 1998–1999 | Columbus Crew | 0 | (0) |
| 1999 | Chicago Fire | 0 | (0) |
| 1999 | → Richmond Kickers (loan) | ? | (0) |
| 2000–2001 | Richmond Kickers | ? | (0) |
| 2002 | D.C. United | 0 | (0) |
| 2003 | Chicago Fire | 0 | (0) |

Managerial career
- 1995–1996: Wake Forest Demon Deacons (assistant)
- 1997: Virginia Cavaliers (goalkeepers)
- 1999–2009: Virginia Cavaliers (assistant)
- 2010–2017: Saint Louis Billikens
- 2020–2025: North Carolina FC (assistant)
- 2026–: Sporting JAX (assistant)
- * Club domestic league appearances and goals

Michael McGinty (born August 17, 1971) is an American retired soccer player who is currently an assistant coach with Sporting JAX in USL Championship. During his career, McGinty played as a goalkeeper for various Major League Soccer teams.

== Playing career ==
During his playing career, McGinty played college soccer for Wake Forest University, and was a backup goalie for various A-League and MLS teams.

== Coaching career ==
=== Virginia Cavaliers ===
From 1999 until 2009, McGinty served on George Gelnovatch's coaching staff at the University of Virginia.

=== Saint Louis Billikens ===
On March 10, 2010, McGinty was hired as the head coach for the Saint Louis Billikens men's soccer team. McGinty was formally introduced on March 23, 2010.

On November 10, 2017, it was announced that McGinty's contract with Saint Louis University was not renewed. McGinty finished his coaching career for the Billikens with an 81–56–14 record.

=== North Carolina FC ===
After serving as a coach with various United States youth national teams, McGinty joined Dave Sarachan's staff at North Carolina FC of the USL Championship.

=== Sporting JAX ===
On February 5, 2026, USL Championship expansion club Sporting Club Jacksonville, better known as Sporting JAX, announced their full inaugural roster and coaching staff through the club's Instagram. The announcement listed McGinty as assistant coach.

== Honors ==
=== Coach ===
- Atlantic 10 Conference Coach of the Year (3): 2012, 2013, 2016
