= Jeff Bilyk =

American soccer player and coach (born 1977)

Personal information
- Date of birth: May 7, 1977 (age 49)
- Place of birth: Bayport, New York, U.S.
- Height: 5 ft 7 in (1.70 m)
- Position: Midfielder

College career
Years	Team	Apps	(Gls)
1995–1998	Clemson Tigers		

Senior career*
Years	Team	Apps	(Gls)
1999–2001	Miami Fusion	35	(0)
1999	→ MLS Pro 40 (loan)	11	(1)
2000	→ MLS Pro 40 (loan)	3	(0)
2002	Milwaukee Rampage	23	(0)
2003–2006	Virginia Beach Mariners	63	(0)
2007	Hampton Roads Piranhas	0	(0)
2008	Charlotte Eagles	10	(1)

Managerial career
- 2007–2009: Davidson Wildcats (assistant)
- 2012–2015: Appalachian State Mountaineers (assistant)
- 2015–2016: Appalachian State Mountaineers (associate head coach)
- 2019–: Charlotte Independence (academy)
- * Club domestic league appearances and goals

Jeff Bilyk (born May 7, 1977) is an American retired soccer player who spent three years in Major League Soccer. He is currently the academy director for the Charlotte Independence.

== Player ==
Bilyk attended Clemson University, playing on the men's soccer team from 1995 to 1999. In February 1999, the Columbus Crew selected Bilyk in the second round (eighteenth overall) of the 1999 MLS College Draft. The Crew waived him on April 2, 1999. He then signed with the Miami Fusion where he played from 1999 to 2001. In 1999, he played eleven games on loan to MLS Pro 40 and in 2000, he played three games on loan to Pro 40. In 2002, he played for the Milwaukee Rampage as the Rampage won the USL A-League championship. He played as a midfielder for USL First Division side Virginia Beach Mariners from 2003 to 2006. On April 18, 2007, the Hampton Roads Piranhas signed Bilyk. Injuries kept him from playing. On March 24, 2008, he joined the Charlotte Eagles of the USL Second Division.

== Coach ==
From 2007 to 2009, Bilyk served as an assistant coach with Davidson College. Bilyk joined the staff off the Appalachian State Mountaineers men's soccer team in 2012, and was promoted to associate head coach in 2015.
