= Sam Franklin (soccer) =

American soccer player

Personal information
- Place of birth: Arlington, Virginia, U.S.
- Height: 5 ft 11 in (1.80 m)
- Positions: Midfielder; defender

Youth career
- 1994–1998: Virginia Cavaliers

Senior career*
Years	Team	Apps	(Gls)
1999–2000	Boston Bulldogs	28	(4)
2001	Connecticut Wolves	2	(0)
- * Club domestic league appearances and goals

Sam Franklin is an American retired soccer player who spent his professional career in the USL A-League.

== Youth ==
In 1994, Franklin graduated from Yorktown High School where he was 1994 All-Met soccer player. He attended the University of Virginia, playing on the men's soccer team from 1994 to 1998.

== Professional ==
On February 6, 1999, the Los Angeles Galaxy selected Franklin in the second round (twenty-fourth overall) of the 1999 MLS College Draft. The Boston Bulldogs also selected Franklin in the USL A-League draft. Franklin signed with the Bulldogs and spent two seasons in Boston. In 2001, he played for the Connecticut Wolves.
