= Maurizio Rocha =

Bolivian footballer (born 1976)

Personal information
- Full name: Maurizio Rocha-Villarroel
- Date of birth: August 20, 1976 (age 50)
- Place of birth: Santa Cruz de la Sierra, Bolivia
- Height: 5 ft 9 in (1.75 m)
- Position: Midfielder

Youth career
- 1995–1998: Connecticut Huskies

Senior career*
Years	Team	Apps	(Gls)
1999–2000	Miami Fusion	11	(0)
1999	→ Project 40 (loan)	13	(0)
2003	Rochester Rhinos	5	(0)
2003	El Paso Patriots	6	(0)
2004	Western Mass Pioneers	6	(0)
- * Club domestic league appearances and goals

Maurizio Rocha is a Bolivian retired football (soccer) midfielder who played professionally in Major League Soccer and USL A-League.

== Youth ==
Rocha graduated from Saint Benedict's Preparatory School, which he had attended through St. Benedict's foreign exchange program with the Tahuichi Academy in Bolivia. Rocha attended the University of Connecticut, playing on the men's soccer team from 1995 to 1998. He was a 1998 First Team All American.

== Professional ==
In February 1999, Rocha signed the Major League Soccer Project 40 and was assigned to the Miami Fusion. He spent the 1999 season with Project 40. In 2000, he played eleven games with the Fusion first team. The Fusion waived Rocha on November 2, 2000. In 2003, he played for the Rochester Rhinos and El Paso Patriots of the USL A-League. In April 2004, he signed with the Western Mass Pioneers, but was released in July. Rocha also played for Real Santa Cruz in Bolivia.
