= Ubusuku Abukusumo =

American soccer player (born 1977)

Personal information
- Date of birth: March 24, 1977 (age 49)
- Place of birth: Albuquerque, New Mexico, United States
- Height: 6 ft 3 in (1.91 m)
- Position: Defender

Youth career
- 1994: UNLV Rebels
- 1995–1996: NC State Wolfpack

Senior career*
Years	Team	Apps	(Gls)
1997–1999	Columbus Crew	11	(0)
1998	→ MLS Pro 40 (loan)	10	(0)
1999	→ MLS Pro 40 (loan)	20	(0)
2000	Minnesota Thunder	12	(0)
2000	→ Tampa Bay Mutiny (loan)	0	(0)
2000	Raleigh Express	11	(0)
- * Club domestic league appearances and goals

Ubusuku Abukusumo is an American retired soccer defender who played professionally in Major League Soccer and the USL A-League.

== Youth ==
In 1994, Abukusomo began his collegiate career at UNLV. He then transferred to North Carolina State where he played on the men's soccer team in 1995 and 1996.

== Professional ==
In 1997, he signed an MLS Project 40 contract and was assigned to the Columbus Crew on June 5. He played sparingly for the Crew over three seasons with much of the 1998 and 1999 seasons on loan to the MLS Pro 40 team. On November 25, 1999, the Crew waived Abukusumo. In February 2000, the Tampa Bay Mutiny selected Abukusumo in the sixth round (sixty-fourth overall) of the 2000 MLS SuperDraft. The Mutiny released him in pre-season. On April 7, 2000, he signed with the Minnesota Thunder of the USL A-League. In June, the Tampa Bay Mutiny called Abukusumo for one game. On July 11, 2000, the Thunder traded him to the Raleigh Express for future considerations. He finished the season in Raleigh. He retired at the end of the season and returned to finish his college degree at the University of New Mexico.

== International ==
In 1998, Abukusumo played for the U.S. U-23 team.
