= Andy Kirk (soccer) =

American soccer player

Personal information
- Date of birth: October 3, 1977 (age 49)
- Place of birth: Milwaukee, Wisconsin, U.S.
- Height: 6 ft 0 in (1.83 m)
- Position: Goalkeeper

Youth career
- 1996–1997: Maryland Terrapins

Senior career*
Years	Team	Apps	(Gls)
1998	San Jose Earthquakes	9	(0)
1998	→ MLS Pro-40 (loan)	3	(0)
1999–2000	Tampa Bay Mutiny	6	(0)

International career
1993	United States U17		
1997	United States U20	19	(0)

Managerial career
- Maryland Terrapins (assistant)
- * Club domestic league appearances and goals

Andy Kirk (born October 3, 1977) is an American retired soccer goalkeeper who spent three seasons in Major League Soccer. He was also a member of the United States U-17 men's national soccer team at the 1993 FIFA U-17 World Championship and the United States U-20 men's national soccer team at the 1997 FIFA World Youth Championship.

== Youth ==
Kirk graduated from Marquette University High School where he was a Gatorade High School Soccer Player of the Year. He then attended the University of Maryland, College Park where he spent two seasons with the men's soccer team. In January 1998, he announced his intention to leave the team in order to pursue a professional career.

== Professional ==
He signed with MLS Project 40. He spent time with both the Pro-40 team as well as playing nine games with the Clash. On January 27, 1999, the Clash sent Kirk to the Tampa Bay Mutiny in exchange for a second round selection in the 2000 MLS SuperDraft. He played six games in 1999, but none in 2000. Following the season, he decided to retire.

He returned to the University of Maryland where he gained a bachelor's degree in finance. He then became an accountant with Rydex Investments.

== National team ==
In 1993, he was a member of the United States U-17 men's national soccer team which competed at the 1993 FIFA U-17 World Championship. However, Kirk never entered a game as he backed up Jon Busch. In 1997, Kirk was called into the United States U-20 men's national soccer team. He played nineteen games, four at the 1997 FIFA World Youth Championship that year.

He served for one year at Maryland.
