= Randy Merkel =

American soccer player

Personal information
- Date of birth: March 20, 1976 (age 50)
- Place of birth: Carol Stream, Illinois, U.S.
- Height: 5 ft 10 in (1.78 m)
- Position: Midfielder

Youth career
- 1995: Penn State Nittany Lions
- 1996–1998: Maryland Terrapins

Senior career*
Years	Team	Apps	(Gls)
1999–2000	Raleigh Express	55	(5)
2001	Atlanta Silverbacks	17	(0)
2001	→ Miami Fusion (loan)	1	(0)
- * Club domestic league appearances and goals

Randy Merkel is an American retired soccer midfielder who played professionally in the USL A-League and Major League Soccer.

Merkel began his collegiate career in 1995 at the Penn State. He then transferred to the University of Maryland where he played on the men's soccer team from 1996 to 1998.

In February 1997, the Columbus Crew selected Merkel in the third round (thirty-third overall) of the 1999 MLS College Draft. The Crew released Merkel in the pre-season and he signed with the Raleigh Express of the USL A-League. In 2001, Merkel moved to the Atlanta Silverbacks. In June 2001, the Miami Fusion of the Major League Soccer called up Merkel for one game. The Silverbacks released Merkel in February 2002.
