= Tim Sahaydak =

American soccer coach and former player (born 1977)

Personal information
- Date of birth: June 1, 1977 (age 49)
- Place of birth: Bethlehem, Pennsylvania
- Height: 6 ft 1 in (1.85 m)
- Position: Defender

Youth career
- Liberty High School

College career
| Years | Team | Apps | (Gls) |
| 1995–97 | North Carolina Tar Heels | | |

Senior career*
| Years | Team | Apps | (Gls) |
| 1997–98 | Columbus Crew | 0 | (0) |
| 1998–2000 | → MLS Project-40 (loan) | 26 | (0) |
| 1999–2001 | Miami Fusion | 22 | (0) |
| 2001 | Charleston Battery | 5 | (0) |
| 2002 | Pittsburgh Riverhounds | 15 | (0) |

Managerial career
- 2007–2012: VCU Rams women's soccer (co-head coach)
- 2013–: UCF Knights women's soccer (associate head coach)
- * Club domestic league appearances and goals

Tim Sahaydak (born June 1, 1977) is an American soccer coach and former player. He is currently associate head coach of the UCF Knights women's soccer program. As a player, he played several seasons in Major League Soccer (MLS) for Miami Fusion F.C.

== Playing career ==
Sahaydak attended Liberty High School in Bethlehem, Pennsylvania, where he was an All-State representative. While touring with a state team, he was in Moscow during the 1991 Soviet coup d'état attempt.

=== College career ===
Sahaydak joined the North Carolina Tar Heels men's soccer program on a scholarship in 1995. He left in 1997 after his sophomore year.

=== Professional career ===
After leaving college Sahaydak was signed as a Project-40 player, eventually being assigned to the Columbus Crew. From 1998 to 2000, he played matches for the Project-40 team in the United Soccer Leagues (USL) A-League. After two seasons with the Crew, he transferred to the Miami Fusion. Between 1999 and 2001, Sahaydak played 22 times for the Fusion.

== Coaching career ==
Sahaydak took to coaching as co-head coach of the VCU Rams women's soccer program alongside his wife, former international player Tiffany Roberts. After six years with the Rams, he joined the UCF Knights women's soccer program as associate head coach again alongside his wife.
