= Generation Adidas =

American soccer development program

- Type: Joint venture
- Industry: Sport
- Founded: 1997; 29 years ago
- Headquarters: United States
- Area served: United States
- Products: Recruitement of soccer players
- Owner: Major League Soccer; U.S. Soccer

Generation Adidas is a joint venture between Major League Soccer and U.S. Soccer aimed at raising the level of young professional soccer talent in the United States. The program, sponsored by Adidas, offers professional-ready players in the U.S. developmental system not yet eligible for the MLS SuperDraft early entry, allowing MLS to compete with foreign professional clubs without comparable restrictions on player signing. From its establishment in 1997 to 2005, the program was sponsored by Nike and was called Project-40. Originally intended to improve the U.S. national team player pool, American national team eligibility is no longer required for program entry.

Carlos Parra was the first Project-40 player when he signed with the league and was allocated to the New York/New Jersey MetroStars in 1997. Since then, the program has included players such as Tim Howard, DaMarcus Beasley, Maurice Edu, Carlos Bocanegra, Clint Dempsey, Jozy Altidore, Ben Olsen, Sacha Kljestan, Freddy Adu, Brad Guzan, Michael Bradley, Nick Rimando, Kyle Beckerman, and NFL kicker Josh Lambo.

Generation Adidas players do not count against the MLS senior roster and usually earn a much higher salary than the league minimum. Entering into the program automatically classifies a player as professional, and thus disqualifies them from playing college soccer. As a result, Generation Adidas players are also guaranteed scholarships to continue their college education should they end their professional career early.

From 1998 to 2000, MLS entered a team of Project-40 players, supplemented by other MLS players who did not get much playing time, into the A-League in the USL.

In 2017, MLS introduced Canadian Generation Adidas players, part of a new initiative with the Canadian Soccer Association. Canadian Generation Adidas players count as domestic players on US based MLS teams.

== Players ==
=== 1997 ===
Player	Age	Pos	Hometown	College/prior	Assigned team
(United States) Ubusuku Abukusumo	19	D	Albuquerque, NM	North Carolina State	Columbus Crew
(United States) Jose Botello	20	M	Los Angeles, CA	East Los Angeles College	Los Angeles Galaxy
(Brazil) Nino Da Silva	17	M	Hoffman Estates, IL		Kansas City Wizards
(United States) Joey DiGiamarino	19	D	Corona, CA	Cal State Fullerton	Colorado Rapids
(United States) Brian Dunseth	19	D	Upland, CA	Cal State Fullerton	New England Revolution
(United States) Carlos Parra	19	M	West Haven, CT		MetroStars
(United States) Eric Quill	18	F	Missouri City, TX	Clemson	Tampa Bay Mutiny
(United States) Esmundo Rodriguez	19	M	Dallas, TX	Indiana	San Jose Clash
(United States) Tim Sahaydak	19	D	Bethlehem, PA	North Carolina	Columbus Crew
(United States) Juan Sastoque	19	F	Brooklyn, NY	CSUN	Dallas Burn

=== 1998 ===
Player	Age	Pos	Hometown	College/prior	Assigned team
(United States) Jamar Beasley	18	F	Fort Wayne, IN		New England Revolution
(United States) Judah Cooks	21	M	Bethesda, MD	Maryland	D.C. United
(United States) Tim Howard	18	GK	North Brunswick, NJ		MetroStars
(United States) Andy Kirk	20	GK	Milwaukee, WI	Maryland	San Jose Clash
(United States) Chad McCarty	20	D	Clovis, CA	Washington	Tampa Bay Mutiny
(United States) Matt Napoleon	20	GK	Feasterville, PA	Columbia	Miami Fusion
(United States) Ben Olsen	20	M/F	Middletown, PA	Virginia	D.C. United
(Trinidad and Tobago) Barry Swift	20	F	Port-of-Spain, Trinidad		MetroStars
(United States) Scott Vermillion	21	D	Olathe, KS	Virginia	Tampa Bay Mutiny
(United States) Brian West	19	F	Columbia, MD	Virginia	Columbus Crew
(United States) Josh Wolff	20	F	Stone Mountain, GA	South Carolina	Chicago Fire

=== 1999 ===
Player	Age	Pos	Hometown	College/prior	Assigned team
(United States) Chris Albright	20	F	Philadelphia, PA	Virginia	D.C. United
(United States) DaMarcus Beasley	16	M	Fort Wayne, IN	Bradenton Academy	Los Angeles Galaxy
(United States) Scott Bower	20	F/M	Tampa, FL	Clemson	San Jose Earthquakes
(Ukraine) Sergi Daniv	23	M	Lviv, Ukraine	Wake Forest	Chicago Fire
(United States) Francisco Gomez	19	M	Watsonville, CA	California Jaguars	Kansas City Wizards
(United States) Michael Green	20	D	Columbia, MD	Virginia	Kansas City Wizards
(Ukraine) Dema Kovalenko	21	M	Rochester, NY	Indiana	Chicago Fire
(Serbia) Alen Kozić	22	D/M	Tampa, FL	Florida International	Miami Fusion
(United States) Matt Nyman	22	G	Westbrook, CT	Dartmouth	Tampa Bay Mutiny
(United States) Antonio Otero	21	M	Tampa, FL	American	D.C. United
(El Salvador) Marvin Quijano	19	F	North Hollywood, CA	Rio Hondo Comm College	Los Angeles Galaxy
(Bolivia) Maurizio Rocha	22	M	Santa Cruz, Bolivia	Connecticut	Miami Fusion
(United States) Scott Vallow	21	GK	Naperville, IL	Bowling Green	Dallas Burn

=== 2000 ===
Player	Age	Pos	Hometown	College/prior	Draft team
(Palestine) Shaker Asad	20	M	Raleigh, NC	North Carolina State	New England Revolution
(United States) Kyle Beckerman	17	M	Crofton, MD	US Under-17	Miami Fusion
(United States) Carlos Bocanegra	20	D	Alta Loma, CA	UCLA	Chicago Fire
(United States) Danny Califf	19	D	Orange, CA	Maryland	Los Angeles Galaxy
(United States) Bobby Convey	16	M	Philadelphia, PA	Bradenton Academy	D.C. United
(United States) Micah Cooks	18	M	Washington, DC		D.C. United
(United States) Nick Garcia	20	D	Plano, TX	Indiana	Kansas City Wizards
(United States) Mario Longo	19	M	Apex, NC		Columbus Crew
(United States) Rusty Pierce	20	D	The Woodlands, TX	UNC Greensboro	New England Revolution
(United States) Nick Rimando	20	GK	Montclair, CA	UCLA	Miami Fusion
(United States) Seth Trembly	17	M	Littleton, CO	Bradenton Academy	Colorado Rapids
(Bolivia) Sergio Salas	18	F	Falls Church, VA		D.C. United

=== 2001 ===
Player	Age	Pos	Hometown	College/prior	Draft team
(United States) Devin Barclay	17	F	Annapolis, MD	US Under-20	Tampa Bay Mutiny
(United States) Isaias Bardales	21	F	San Jose, CA	San Jose State	Los Angeles Galaxy
(United States) Edson Buddle	19	F	New Rochelle, NY	State Fair Community College	Columbus Crew
(United States) Jose Aparicio Sanchez Jr.	16	F	Houston, TX		San Jose Earthquakes
(United States) José Burciaga Jr.	19	D	Duncanville, TX	US Under-20	Kansas City Wizards
(United States) Chris Carrieri	20	F	Stafford, VA	North Carolina	San Jose Earthquakes
(United States) D.J. Countess	19	GK	Sacramento, CA	UCLA	MetroStars
(United States) Nick Downing	20	D	Redmond, WA	Maryland	New England Revolution
(United States) Eddie Johnson	16	F	Palm Coast, FL	Bradenton Academy	Dallas Burn
(Ecuador) Martin Klinger	20	F	Kearny, NJ	MetroStars Black	MetroStars
(United States) Santino Quaranta	16	F	Baltimore, MD	Bradenton Academy	D.C. United
(United States) Miguel Saavedra	17	M	Milwaukee, WI	US Under-18	Dallas Burn

=== 2002 ===
Player	Age	Pos	Hometown	College/prior	Draft team
(United States) Nelson Akwari	19	D	Houston, TX	UCLA	MetroStars
(United States) Craig Capano	16	M	Hyde Park, NY	Bradenton Academy	Chicago Fire
(United States) Brad Davis	20	M	St. Charles, MO	Saint Louis	MetroStars
(United States) Kelly Gray	20	D	Palo Alto, CA	Portland	Chicago Fire
(United States) Justin Mapp	17	M	Brandon, MS	Bradenton Academy	D.C. United
(United States) Kyle Martino	20	M	Atlanta, GA	Virginia	Columbus Crew
(United States) Jordan Stone	17	D	Allen, TX	US Under-17	Dallas Burn

=== 2003 ===
Player	Age	Pos	Hometown	College/prior	Draft team
(El Salvador) Arturo Alvarez	17	F/M	Houston, TX	US Under-17	San Jose Earthquakes
(United States) Brian Carroll	21	M	Fairfax, VA	Wake Forest	D.C. United
(United States) Ricardo Clark	19	M	Jonesboro, GA	Furman	MetroStars
(United States) Alecko Eskandarian	20	F	Montvale, NJ	Virginia	D.C. United
(United States) Eddie Gaven	16	M	Hamilton, NJ	Bradenton Academy	MetroStars
(United States) Guillermo Gonzalez	16	M	Paramount, CA	Bradenton Academy	Los Angeles Galaxy
(United States) Nate Jaqua	21	F	Eugene, OR	Portland	Chicago Fire
(United States) Jacob LeBlanc	21	M	Palo Alto, VA	Virginia	MetroStars
(United States) Ricky Lewis	20	D	Spring, TX	Clemson	Los Angeles Galaxy
(United States) Mike Magee	18	F/M	South Barrington, IL	Bradenton Academy	MetroStars
(United States) Logan Pause	21	D	Hillsborough, NC	North Carolina	Chicago Fire
(United States) David Stokes	20	D	Dumfries, VA	North Carolina	D.C. United
(United States) Jason Thompson	21	F	Garland, TX	Eastern Illinois	Dallas Burn

=== 2004 ===
Player	Age	Pos	Hometown	College/prior	Draft team
(United States) Freddy Adu	14	M	Potomac, MD	US Under-17	D.C. United
(United States) Michael Bradley	16	M	Palatine, IL	US Under-17	MetroStars
(United States) Ryan Cochrane	20	D	Portland, OR	Santa Clara	San Jose Earthquakes
(United States) Steve Cronin	20	GK	Sacramento, CA	Santa Clara	San Jose Earthquakes
(United States) Clint Dempsey	20	M	Nacogdoches, TX	Furman	New England Revolution
(United States) Josh Gardner	21	M	Houston, TX	Cincinnati	Los Angeles Galaxy
(United States) Clarence Goodson	21	D	Springfield, VA	Maryland	Dallas Burn
(United States) Ned Grabavoy	20	M	New Lenox, IL	Indiana	Los Angeles Galaxy
(United States) Chad Marshall	19	D	Riverside, CA	Stanford	Columbus Crew
(United States) Danny Szetela	16	M	Clifton, NJ	US Under-17	Columbus Crew

=== 2005 ===
Player	Age	Pos	Hometown	College/prior	Draft team
(United States) Chad Barrett	19	F	Beaverton, OR	UCLA	Chicago Fire
(United States) Nikolas Besagno	16	M	Maple Valley, WA	US Under-17	Real Salt Lake
(United States) Hunter Freeman	20	D	Allen, TX	Virginia	Colorado Rapids
(United States) Brad Guzan	20	GK	Homer Glen, IL	South Carolina	Chivas USA
(United States) Christian Jimenez	18	M	San Dimas, CA	US Under-20	Chivas USA
(United States) Will John	19	F	Kansas City, MO	Saint Louis	Chicago Fire
(United States) Quavas Kirk	16	F	Aurora, IL	US Under-17	Los Angeles Galaxy
(United States) Drew Moor	20	D	Dallas, TX	Indiana	FC Dallas
(United States) Michael Parkhurst	20	D	Cranston, RI	Wake Forest	New England Revolution
(United States) Ryan Pore	21	F	Mansfield, OH	Tulsa	Kansas City Wizards
(United States) Tim Ward	17	D	Waukesha, WI	Saint Louis	MetroStars
(United States) Jamie Watson	18	F	Dallas, TX	North Carolina	Real Salt Lake

=== 2006 ===
Player	Age	Pos	Hometown	College/prior	Draft team
(United States) Jozy Altidore	16	F	Boca Raton, FL	IMG Soccer Academy	MetroStars
(Armenia) Yura Movsisyan	18	F	Pasadena, CA	Pasadena	Kansas City Wizards
(United States) David Arvizu	17	F	Santa Ana, CA	US Under-20	MetroStars
(United States) Patrick Ianni	20	D/M	Lodi, CA	UCLA	Houston Dynamo
(Sierra Leone) Kei Kamara	21	F	Lawndale, CA	Cal State Dominguez Hills	Columbus Crew
(United States) Sacha Kljestan	20	M	Huntington Beach, CA	Seton Hall	Chivas USA
(United States) Dax McCarty	18	M	Winter Park, FL	North Carolina	FC Dallas
(United States) Jacob Peterson	19	F	Portage, MI	Indiana	Colorado Rapids
(Guatemala) Willie Sims	21	F	Los Angeles, CA	Cal State Northridge	New England Revolution
(United States) Nathan Sturgis	18	D/M	St. Augustine, FL	Clemson	Los Angeles Galaxy
(United States) Blake Wagner	17	D	Tampa, FL	US Under-20	FC Dallas
(United States) Marvell Wynne	19	D	Poway, CA	UCLA	MetroStars
(United States) Jed Zayner	21	D	Orland Park, IL	Indiana	Columbus Crew

=== 2007 ===
Player	Age	Pos	Hometown	College/prior	Draft team
(United States) Chris Seitz	19	GK	San Luis Obispo, CA	Maryland	Real Salt Lake
(United States) Bryan Arguez	17	D/M	Miami, FL	US Under-20	D.C. United
(United States) Anthony Wallace	17	D/M	St. Petersburg, FL	South Florida	FC Dallas
(United States) Amaechi Igwe	17	D	Belmont, CA	Santa Clara	New England Revolution
(United States) Maurice Edu	20	M	Fontana, CA	Maryland	Toronto FC
(United States) Nico Colaluca	20	M/F	Coventry, RI	Virginia	Colorado Rapids
(Mali) Bakary Soumaré	21	D	New York, NY	Virginia	Chicago Fire
(Ethiopia) Fuad Ibrahim	15	F	Richfield, MN	US Under-17	FC Dallas

=== 2008 ===
Player	Age	Pos	Hometown	College/prior	Draft team
(United States) Eric Avila	20	M	San Diego, CA	UC Santa Barbara	FC Dallas
(United States) Tony Beltran	20	D/M	Claremont, CA	UCLA	Real Salt Lake
(Honduras) Roger Espinoza	21	M	Aurora, CO	Ohio State	Kansas City Wizards
(United States) Josh Lambo	17	GK	Middleton, WI	US Under-17	FC Dallas
(United States) Chance Myers	20	D/M	Thousand Oaks, CA	UCLA	Kansas City Wizards
(United States) Alex Nimo	17	F/M	Portland, OR	US Under-17	Real Salt Lake
(Ghana) Patrick Nyarko	22	F	Kumasi, Ghana	Virginia Tech	Chicago Fire
(United States) Ciaran O'Brien	20	M	Tacoma, WA	UC Santa Barbara	Colorado Rapids
(United States) Brek Shea	17	M/D	College Station, TX	US Under-17	FC Dallas
(United States) Rob Valentino	22	D	Cave Creek, AZ	San Francisco	New England Revolution

=== 2009 ===
Player	Age	Pos	Hometown	College/prior	Draft team
(United States) Kevin Alston	20	D	Silver Spring, MD	Indiana	New England Revolution
(United States) Danny Cruz	19	M	Glendale, AZ	UNLV	Houston Dynamo
(Switzerland) Stefan Frei	22	GK	Widnau, Switzerland	California	Toronto FC
(United States) Omar Gonzalez	20	D	Dallas, TX	Maryland	Los Angeles Galaxy
(Puerto Rico) Jeremy Hall	20	M	Tampa, FL	Maryland	New York Red Bulls
(Bosnia and Herzegovina) Baggio Hušidić	21	M	Libertyville, IL	UIC	Chicago Fire
(United States) Peri Marošević	19	F	Rockford, IL	Michigan	FC Dallas
(Costa Rica) Rodney Wallace	20	M	Rockville, MD	Maryland	D.C. United
(Democratic Republic of the Congo) Steve Zakuani	20	F	London, England	Akron	Seattle Sounders FC

=== 2010 ===
Player	Age	Pos	Hometown	College/prior	Draft team
(United States) Corben Bone	21	M	Plano, TX	Wake Forest	Chicago Fire
(United States) Teal Bunbury	19	F	Prior Lake, MN	Akron	Kansas City Wizards
(United States) Dilly Duka	20	M	Montville, NJ	Rutgers	Columbus Crew
(United States) Blair Gavin	20	M	Louisville, KY	Akron	Chivas USA
(United States) Luis Gil	16	M	Garden Grove, CA	US Under-17	Kansas City Wizards
(United States) Zachary Herold	17	D	Port St. Lucie, FL	US Under-17	Toronto FC
(United States) Sean Johnson	20	GK	Lilburn, GA	UCF	Chicago Fire
(United States) Jack McInerney	17	F	Alpharetta, GA	US Under-17	Philadelphia Union
(Democratic Republic of the Congo) Danny Mwanga	18	F	Kinshasa, DR Congo	Oregon State	Philadelphia Union
(United States) Amobi Okugo	18	M	Sacramento, CA	UCLA	Philadelphia Union
(United States) Ike Opara	20	D	Durham, NC	Wake Forest	San Jose Earthquakes
(Cameroon) Tony Tchani	20	M	Norfolk, VA	Virginia	New York Red Bulls
(United States) Andrew Wiedeman	20	F	San Ramon, CA	California	FC Dallas

=== 2011 ===
Player	Age	Pos	Hometown	College/prior	Draft team
(United States) David Bingham	21	GK	Castro Valley, CA	California	San Jose Earthquakes
(United States) Will Bruin	21	F	St. Louis, MO	Indiana	Houston Dynamo
(United States) Corey Hertzog	20	F	Reading, PA	Penn State	New York Red Bulls
(United States) Perry Kitchen	18	M	Indianapolis, IN	Akron	D.C. United
(United States) Zac MacMath	19	GK	St. Petersburg, FL	Maryland	Philadelphia Union
(United States) Darlington Nagbe	20	M	Lakewood, OH	Akron	Portland Timbers
(United States) Michael Nanchoff	22	M	North Royalton, OH	Akron	Vancouver Whitecaps FC
(United States) Omar Salgado	17	F	El Paso, TX	US Under-20	Vancouver Whitecaps FC
(United States) Kofi Sarkodie	19	D	Huber Heights, OH	Akron	Houston Dynamo
(Ghana) Michael Tetteh	21	D	Accra, Ghana	UC Santa Barbara	Seattle Sounders FC
(United States) Zarek Valentin	19	D	Lancaster, PA	Akron	Chivas USA

=== 2012 ===
Player	Age	Pos	Hometown	College/prior	Draft team
(United States) Dom Dwyer	21	F	London, England	USF	Sporting Kansas City
(United States) Sam Garza	21	F	Highland Village, TX	UC Santa Barbara	San Jose Earthquakes
(United States) Chandler Hoffman	21	F	Birmingham, AL	UCLA	Philadelphia Union
(Haiti) Andrew Jean-Baptiste	19	D	Brentwood, NY	Connecticut	Portland Timbers
(Uruguay) Enzo Martinez	21	M	Rock Hill, SC	North Carolina	Real Salt Lake
(Jamaica) Darren Mattocks	21	F	Portmore, Jamaica	Akron	Vancouver Whitecaps FC
(United States) Tyler Polak	19	D	Lincoln, NE	Creighton	New England Revolution
(United States) Kelyn Rowe	20	M	Federal Way, WA	UCLA	New England Revolution
(United States) Andrew Wenger	21	D	Lititz, PA	Duke	Montreal Impact

=== 2013 ===
Player	Age	Pos	Hometown	College/prior	Draft team
(Jamaica) Deshorn Brown	21	F	Manchester, Jamaica	UCF	Colorado Rapids
(United States) Andrew Farrell	20	D	Louisville, KY	Louisville	New England Revolution
(Jamaica) Jason Johnson	22	F	Happy News, Jamaica	VCU	Houston Dynamo
(The Gambia) Kekuta Manneh	18	F	Austin, TX	Austin Aztex	Vancouver Whitecaps FC
(United States) Mikey Lopez	19	M	Dallas, TX	North Carolina	Sporting Kansas City
(United States) Walker Zimmerman	19	D	Lawrenceville, GA	Furman	FC Dallas
(El Salvador) Eriq Zavaleta	20	F	Westfield, IN	Indiana	Seattle Sounders FC

=== 2014 ===
Player	Age	Pos	Hometown	College/prior	Draft team
(Jamaica) Andre Blake	23	GK	May Pen, Jamaica	Connecticut	Philadelphia Union
(United States) A.J. Cochran	20	D	St. Louis, MO	Wisconsin	Houston Dynamo
(United States) Christian Dean	21	D	East Palo Alto, CA	California	Vancouver Whitecaps FC
(United States) Marlon Hairston	19	M	Jackson, MS	Louisville	Colorado Rapids
(Jamaica) Damion Lowe	20	D	Kingston, Jamaica	Hartford	Seattle Sounders FC
(United States) Eric Miller	20	D	Woodbury, MN	Creighton	Montreal Impact
(Zimbabwe) Schillo Tshuma	21	F	Bulawayo, Zimbabwe	Maryland	Portland Timbers

=== 2015 ===
Player	Age	Pos	Hometown	College/prior	Draft team
(United States) Alex Bono	20	G	Syracuse, NY	Syracuse	Toronto FC
(United States) Conor Donovan	19	D	Fuquay-Varina, NC	North Carolina State	Orlando City SC
(Canada) Cyle Larin	19	F	Brampton, ON	Connecticut	Orlando City SC
(United States) Cristian Roldan	19	M	Pico Rivera, CA	Washington	Seattle Sounders FC
(Jamaica) Romario Williams	20	F	Portmore, Jamaica	UCF	Montreal Impact

=== 2016 ===
Player	Age	Pos	Hometown	College/prior	Draft team
(Germany) Julian Engels	22	M	Dülmen, Germany	Syracuse	D.C. United
(England) Jack Harrison	19	M	Bolton, England	Wake Forest	Chicago Fire
(Germany) Fabian Herbers	22	F	Ahaus, Germany	Creighton	Philadelphia Union
(Jamaica) Omar Holness	21	M	Kingston, Jamaica	North Carolina	Real Salt Lake
(Canada) Richie Laryea	21	M	Toronto, ON	Akron	Orlando City SC
(United States) Andrew Tarbell	21	G	Mandeville, LA	Clemson	San Jose Earthquakes
(Ghana) Joshua Yaro	21	D	Kumasi, Ghana	Georgetown	Philadelphia Union

=== 2017 ===
Player	Age	Pos	Hometown	College/prior	Draft team
(Ghana) Abu Danladi	21	F	Takoradi, Ghana	UCLA	Minnesota United FC
(United States) Jonathan Lewis	19	F	Plantation, FL	Akron	New York City FC
(Canada) Adonijah Reid	17	F	Brampton, ON	ANB Futbol Academy	FC Dallas
(United States) Miles Robinson	19	D	Arlington, MA	Syracuse	Atlanta United FC
(Canada) Shamit Shome	19	M	Edmonton, AB	FC Edmonton	Montreal Impact
(United States) Jackson Yueill	19	M	St. Paul, MN	UCLA	San Jose Earthquakes

=== 2018 ===
Player	Age	Pos	Hometown	College/prior	Draft team
(England) Mo Adams	21	M	Nottingham, England	Syracuse	Chicago Fire
(Ghana) Francis Atuahene	21	F	Accra, Ghana	Michigan	FC Dallas
(Portugal) João Moutinho	20	D	Lisbon, Portugal	Akron	Los Angeles FC
(Ghana) Edward Opoku	20	F	Konongo, Ghana	Virginia	Columbus Crew
(United States) Mason Toye	19	F	South Orange, NJ	Indiana	Minnesota United FC
(Ghana) Ema Twumasi	20	M	Accra, Ghana	Wake Forest	FC Dallas
(Germany) Gordon Wild	22	F	Cologne, Germany	Maryland	Atlanta United FC

=== 2019 ===
Player	Age	Pos	Hometown	College/prior	Draft team
(United States) Frankie Amaya	18	M	Santa Ana, CA	UCLA	FC Cincinnati
(Canada) Tajon Buchanan	19	F	Brampton, ON	Syracuse	New England Revolution
(United States) Griffin Dorsey	19	F	Evergreen, CO	Indiana	Toronto FC
(Somalia) Siad Haji	19	M	Manchester, NH	VCU	San Jose Earthquakes
(United States) John Nelson	20	D	Medina, OH	North Carolina	FC Dallas
(Canada) Dayne St. Clair	21	G	Pickering ON	Maryland	Minnesota United FC
(United States) JJ Williams	20	F	Montgomery, AL	Kentucky	Columbus Crew

=== 2020 ===
Player	Age	Pos	Hometown	College/prior	Draft team
(United States) Daryl Dike	19	F	Edmond, OK	Virginia	Orlando City SC
(United States) Henry Kessler	20	D	New York, NY	Virginia	New England Revolution
(United States) Jack Maher	20	D	Caseyville, IL	Indiana	Nashville SC
(Canada) Ryan Raposo	19	M	Hamilton, ON	Syracuse	Vancouver Whitecaps FC
(United States) Robbie Robinson	21	F	Camden, SC	Clemson	Inter Miami CF

=== 2021 ===
Player	Age	Pos	Hometown	College/prior	Draft team
(United States) Ethan Bartlow	20	D	Woodinville, WA	Washington	Houston Dynamo
(United States) Bret Halsey	22	M	Sterling, VA	Virginia	Real Salt Lake
(England) Calvin Harris	20	F	Middlesbrough, England	Wake Forest	FC Cincinnati
(Kenya) Philip Mayaka	20	M	Nairobi, Kenya	Clemson	Colorado Rapids
(Venezuela) Daniel Pereira	20	M	Caracas, Venezuela	Virginia Tech	Austin FC

=== 2022 ===
Player	Age	Pos	Hometown	College/prior	Draft team
(United States) Ben Bender	20	M	Baltimore, MD	Maryland	Charlotte FC
(Burkina Faso) Ousseni Bouda	21	F	Ouagadougou, Burkina Faso	Stanford	San Jose Earthquakes
(United States) Erik Centeno	19	D	Stockton, CA	Pacific	Atlanta United FC
(United States) Roman Celentano	21	G	Naperville, IL	Indiana	FC Cincinnati
(United States) Kipp Keller	21	D	St. Louis, MO	Saint Louis	Austin FC
(United States) Isaiah Parker	19	F	Gurnee, IL	Saint Louis	FC Dallas
(United States) Patrick Schulte	20	G	St. Charles, MO	Saint Louis	Columbus Crew
(Iceland) Thorleifur Úlfarsson	21	F	Kópavogur, Iceland	Duke	Houston Dynamo

=== 2023 ===
The 2023 class was announced on December 19, 2022, prior to the 2023 MLS SuperDraft. The first five picks in the draft, including top pick Hamady Diop from Clemson, were Generation Adidas players.

Player	Age	Pos	Hometown	College/prior	Draft team
(United States) Joey Akpunonu	20	D	Toledo, OH	Bowling Green	FC Cincinnati
(Ghana) Joshua Bolma	20	M	Accra, Ghana	Maryland	New England Revolution
(Canada) Moïse Bombito	22	D	Montréal, QC	New Hampshire	Colorado Rapids
(Senegal) Hamady Diop	20	D	Dakar, Senegal	Clemson	Charlotte FC
(United States) CJ Fodrey	18	M	San Diego, CA	San Diego State	Austin FC
(France) Bertin Jacquesson	21	F	Lorrez-le-Bocage-Préaux, France	Pittsburgh	Real Salt Lake
(Ghana) Shak Mohammed	19	F	Kumasi, Ghana	Duke	Orlando City SC
(Cameroon) J.C. Ngando	23	M	Paris, France	UNC Greensboro	Vancouver Whitecaps FC
(United States) Owen O'Malley	21	M	Cary, NC	Creighton	St. Louis City SC
(United States) Ilijah Paul	20	F	Gilbert, AZ	Washington	Real Salt Lake
(United States) Joey Skinner	19	D	Charlotte, NC	Clemson	Nashville SC

=== 2024 ===
The two-member 2024 class was announced on December 19, 2023, the same day as the 2024 MLS SuperDraft.

Player	Age	Pos	Hometown	College/prior	Draft team
(Ghana) Stephen Annor Gyamfi	19	F	Accra, Ghana	Maryland	Houston Dynamo
(Canada) Kimani Stewart-Baynes	18	F	Toronto, ON	Virginia	Colorado Rapids

=== 2025 ===
The 2025 class was announced on December 18, 2024, prior to the 2025 MLS SuperDraft.

Player	Age	Pos	Hometown	College/prior	Draft team
(United States) Dean Boltz	18	F	Palatine, IL	Wisconsin	Chicago Fire FC
(Ghana) Manu Duah	19	M	Kumasi, Ghana	UC Santa Barbara	San Diego FC
(United States) Alex Harris	19	F	Vancouver, WA	Cornell	Colorado Rapids
(United States) Tate Johnson	19	D	Tampa, FL	North Carolina	Vancouver Whitecaps FC

== Project-40 in the A-League ==
Year	Division	League	Reg. season	Playoffs	Cup
1998	2	USISL A-League	5th, Pacific	Did not qualify	Did not qualify
1999	2	USL A-League	2nd, Central	Quarterfinals	Did not qualify
2000	2	USL A-League	4th, Central	Did not qualify	3rd round
