= 2000 New England Revolution season =

New England Revolution
2000 season
- Owner: Robert Kraft (The Kraft Group)
- Head coach: Fernando Clavijo
- Stadium: Foxboro Stadium; Foxborough, Massachusetts
- MLS: Conference: 2nd Overall: 7th
- MLS Cup playoffs: Quarterfinals
- Open Cup: Second round
- Top goalscorer: League: Wolde Harris (15); All: Wolde Harris (15)
- Highest home attendance: 31,113 (vs. LA Galaxy)
- Lowest home attendance: 1,857 (vs. Mid-Michigan Bucks)
- Average home league attendance: 15,463 (Regular Season)
- Biggest win: 3-0 (vs. San Jose Earthquakes)
- Biggest defeat: 4-1 (vs. Columbus Crew)

The 2000 New England Revolution season was the fifth season for the New England Revolution both as a club and in Major League Soccer (MLS). The club was eliminated in the second round of the 2000 U.S. Open Cup after losing 1–0 to the Mid-Michigan Bucks. They qualified for the quarterfinals of the MLS Cup Playoffs, where they were eliminated by the Chicago Fire in a three-game series.

== Summary ==
The Revolution entered a busy off-season following their 1999 campaign, in which they'd missed the playoffs for the second year in a row. On October 12, 1999, the Revolution named Sunil Gulati managing director of Kraft Soccer and appointed Brian O’Donovan as chief operating officer. Following the dismissal of Walter Zenga on September 30, the Revolution appointed Fernando Clavijo as their fourth-ever manager (following Steve Nicol's interim stay at the end of the 1999 season). Renato Capobianco joined Clavijo's staff as an assistant on December 7, and on January 5, Derek Aframe would join the front office as the Vice President of Operations.

The Revs made several acquisitions in the offseason to strengthen their squad. On December 3, Clavijo's Revolution made their first acquisition, signing 1996 MLS All-Star and MLS Best XI striker Eduardo "El Tanque" Hurtado. Three days later, the Revolution acquired 1998 MLS All-Star Mauricio Ramos and a selection in the 2001 MLS SuperDraft from the Tampa Bay Mutiny in exchange for a "player allocation."

February 6, the Revolution acquired Wolde Harris and a third-round pick in the 2000 MLS SuperDraft from the Colorado Rapids in exchange for New England's first- and second-round picks in the 2000 MLS SuperDraft. In the 2000 MLS SuperDraft, Revolution selected Rusty Pierce, Shaker Asad, Fabio Zúñiga, Bo Oshoniyi, Adam Eyre, and Tom Hardy. The club also signed goalkeeper Scott Budnick off waivers from the Miami Fusion. In March, the Revolution signed Costa Rican international William Sunsing from CS Herediano and acquired U.S. International goalkeeper Juergen Sommer from the Columbus Crew in exchange for a third-round pick in the 2001 MLS SuperDraft and future considerations.

Despite missing star striker Joe-Max Moore, who had signed for Everton F.C. in November, Clavijo's Revolution got off to a strong start to the season, dropping only four of their opening fifteen matches. The season opened on March 18 with a 1–1 draw away to the Miami Fusion, courtesy of an Imad Baba 80th minute equalizing goal. The Revolution's first win came in the season home opener, 2-1, thanks to a brace from Baba. In May the club went on a five-game unbeaten run, the longest in their existence to that point.

The club made several more acquisitions as the season progressed. Midfielder Joe Franchino signed for the club in May from the LA Galaxy, as part of a "special draft" that saw Luis Hernández join the Galaxy.

1998 MLS All-Star Mauricio Wright also joined the club in June from the San Jose Earthquakes, in exchange for 1996 Revolution marquee signing Mike Burns, Dan Calichman, and a first-round pick in the 2001 MLS SuperDraft. In July, the Revolution acquired U.S. International Eric Wynalda and future draft considerations from the Miami Fusion in exchange for defender Ivan McKinley. The club also signed Spanish forward José Luis Morales from Salamanca.

The Revolution made history in the 2000 U.S. Open Cup, becoming the first-ever MLS team to lose to an amateur club, when they were defeated in the second round at home by the Mid Michigan Bucks 1-0.

After a six-game winless run mid-summer, the Revolution picked up only four wins in August and September, but still managed to clinch a playoff spot in the final game of the season; a 4–3 win over the MetroStars that saw a brace from Joe Franchino. The Revolution concluded their regular season with a 13-13-6 record (W-L-D), their best in club history to that point.

In the Revolution's second-ever playoff campaign, the club squared off against "Central Division" champion and overall 2nd-seed Chicago Fire in a best-of-three series. The Revolution took a 50th-minute lead in the opening game at Soldier Field, but conceded an own goal four minutes later, and lost on a 73rd minute Dema Kovalenko goal. Four days later the Revolution leveled the tie, in a 2–1 home victory thanks to goals from Eric Wynalda and Mauricio Wright. The match marked the fist playoff victory in Revolution history. Unfortunately in the final match of the tie, the Revolution conceded four first-half goals, en route to a 6-0 Fire victory, and the end of the Revolution's season.

== Squad ==
=== First-team squad ===
As of September 30, 2024. Note: Flags indicate national team as defined under FIFA eligibility rules; some limited exceptions apply. Players may hold more than one non-FIFA nationality.

No.	Pos.	Nation	Player
1	GK	USA	Juergen Sommer
1	GK	USA	Scott Budnick
2	DF	USA	Brian Dunseth
3	DF	USA	Dan Calichman
4	MF	USA	Mike Burns
5	DF	USA	Ted Chronopoulos
6	MF	USA	John Harkes
7	MF	RSA	Ivan McKinley
7	FW	ESP	José Luis Morales
8	MF	USA	Imad Baba
9	FW	USA	Johnny Torres
10	MF	BOL	Mauricio Ramos
11	DF	USA	Joe Franchino (captain)
12	MF	USA	Adam Eyre
13	FW	JAM	Wolde Harris

No.	Pos.	Nation	Player
14	MF	COL	Leonel Alvarez
15	MF	PLE	Shaker Asad
16	MF	USA	Carlos Parra
17	MF	USA	Jamar Beasley
18	FW	IRL	Paul Keegan
19	DF	USA	Rusty Pierce
20	FW	USA	Fabio Zuniga
21	DF	USA	Eric Wynalda
26	GK	USA	Jeff Causey
29	FW	ECU	Eduardo Hurtado
29	DF	CRC	Mauricio Wright
31	GK	USA	David Winner
77	FW	CRC	William Sunsing

== Player movement ==
New England Revolution – 2000 Transfers In
Name	Position	Date	Method	Fee	Previous club	Reference
Wolde Harris	FW	February 6, 2000	Trade	N/A	Colorado Rapids	
Rusty Pierce	DF	February 11, 2000	Draft	N/A	UNC Greensboro Spartans	
Shaker Asad	MF	February 11, 2000	Draft	N/A	NC State	
Fabio Zuniga	FW	February 11, 2000	Draft	N/A	N/A	
Bo Oshoniyi	GK	February 11, 2000	Draft	N/A	Atlanta Silverbacks FC	
Adam Eyre	DF	February 11, 2000	Draft	N/A	Santa Clara	
Tom Hardy	DF	February 11, 2000	Draft	N/A	Vancouver 86ers	
Scott Budnick	GK	February 11, 2000	Waiver claim	N/A	Miami Fusion	
William Sunsing	FW	March 7, 2000	Transfer	Undisclosed	C.S. Herediano	
Juergen Sommer	GK	March 14, 2000	Trade	N/A	Columbus Crew	
Joe Franchino	MF	May 17, 2000	"Special Draft"	N/A	LA Galaxy	
Mauricio Wright	DF	May 30, 2000	Trade	N/A	San Jose Earthquakes	
Eric Wynalda	FW	July 7, 2000	Trade	N/A	Miami Fusion	
Jose Luis Morales	FW	July 10, 2000	Transfer	Undisclosed	UD Salamanca	
David Winner	GK	September 4, 2000	Transfer	Undisclosed	Atlanta Silverbacks FC	

1. Acquired FW Wolde Harris and a third-round pick in the 2000 MLS SuperDraft from the Colorado Rapids in exchange for New England's first- and second-round picks in the 2000 MLS SuperDraft.
2.Acquired GK Juergen Sommer from the Columbus Crew in exchange for a third-round pick in the 2001 MLS SuperDraft and future considerations.
3.Acquired DF Mauricio Wright from the San Jose Earthquakes in exchange for DF Mike Burns, DF Dan Calichman, and a first-round pick in the 2001 MLS SuperDraft.
4.Acquired FW Eric Wynalda and future draft considerations from the Miami Fusion in exchange for DF Ivan McKinley.

=== Transfers Out ===
New England Revolution – 2000 Transfers Out
Name	Position	Date	Method	Fee	Next Club	Reference
Jeff Baicher	MF	January 2, 2000	Trade	N/A	Kansas City Wizards	
Eduardo Hurtado	FW	May 17, 2000	Transfer	Undisclosed	L.D.U. Quito	
Mike Burns	DF	May 30, 2000	Trade	N/A	San Jose Earthquakes	
Dan Calichman	DF	May 30, 2000	Trade	N/A	San Jose Earthquakes	
Ivan McKinley	DF	July 7, 2000	Trade	N/A	Miami Fusion	
Jose Luis Morales	FW	November 1, 2000	Option Declined	N/A	Real Jaén	
Paul Keegan	FW	November 1, 2000	Waived	N/A	Bray Wanderers F.C.	

1. Acquired the Kansas City Wizards’ second-, third-, and fourth-round picks in the 2000 MLS SuperDraft in exchange for MF Jeff Baicher and the Revolution's third round pick in the 2000 MLS SuperDraft.
2. Acquired DF Mauricio Wright from the San Jose Earthquakes in exchange for DF Mike Burns, DF Dan Calichman, and a first-round pick in the 2001 MLS SuperDraft.
3. Acquired FW Eric Wynalda and future draft considerations from the Miami Fusion in exchange for DF Ivan McKinley.

== Standings ==
Conference

Pos	Team	Pld	W	L	T	GF	GA	GD	Pts	Qualification
1	MetroStars	32	17	12	3	64	56	+8	54	MLS Cup Playoffs
2	New England Revolution	32	13	13	6	47	49	−2	45	MLS Cup Playoffs
3	Miami Fusion	32	12	15	5	54	56	−2	41	
4	D.C. United	32	8	18	6	44	63	−19	30	

Source: MLS

Overall

Pos	Team	Pld	W	L	T	GF	GA	GD	Pts	Qualification
1	Kansas City Wizards (C, S)	32	16	7	9	47	29	+18	57	CONCACAF Champions' Cup
2	Chicago Fire	32	17	9	6	67	51	+16	57	CONCACAF Champions' Cup
3	MetroStars	32	17	12	3	64	56	+8	54	
4	Tampa Bay Mutiny	32	16	12	4	62	50	+12	52	
5	Los Angeles Galaxy	32	14	10	8	47	37	+10	50	
6	Dallas Burn	32	14	14	4	54	54	0	46	
7	New England Revolution	32	13	13	6	47	49	−2	45	
8	Colorado Rapids	32	13	15	4	43	59	−16	43	
9	Miami Fusion	32	12	15	5	54	56	−2	41	
10	Columbus Crew	32	11	16	5	48	58	−10	38	
11	D.C. United	32	8	18	6	44	63	−19	30	
12	San Jose Earthquakes	32	7	17	8	35	50	−15	29	

Source: MLS
Rules for classification: 1) points; 2) head-to-head record; 3) goal difference; 4) number of goals scored
(C) Champion; (S) Supporters' Shield

== Results ==
=== Regular season ===
March 18, 2000 1	Miami Fusion	1–1 (a.e.t.)	New England Revolution	Fort Lauderdale, Florida
	Diego Serna 61'; Pablo Mastroeni (yellow card) 72'	Report	Ivan McKinley (yellow card) 37'; Mauricio Ramos (yellow card) 72'; Ted Chronopoulos (yellow card) 74'; Imad Baba 80'; John Harkes (yellow card) 84'	Stadium: Lockhart Stadium; Attendance: 8,782; Referee: Paul Tamberino

March 25, 2000 2	Tampa Bay Mutiny	1–0	New England Revolution	Tampa, Florida
	Raul Diaz Arce 51'	Report	Ivan McKinley (yellow card) 29'; Mauricio Ramos (yellow card) 45'	Stadium: Raymond James Stadium; Attendance: 14,811; Referee: Andrew Barnes

April 1, 2000 3	LA Galaxy	2–2 (a.e.t.)	New England Revolution	Pasadena, California
	Robin Fraser (yellow card) 23'; Cobi Jones 59'; Mauricio Cienfuegos 67'; Danny Pena (yellow card) 67'; Ron Myers (yellow card) 78'	Report	Leonel Alvarez 35'; John Harkes (yellow card) 40'; Wolde Harris 42'; Brian Dunseth (yellow card) 53'; Rusty Pierce (yellow card) 56'; Ivan McKinley (yellow card) 63' (yellow card) 78' (red card); Mauricio Ramos (yellow card) 68'	Stadium: Rose Bowl; Attendance: 19,879; Referee: Brian Hall

April 8, 2000 4	Dallas Burn	2–1	New England Revolution	Dallas, Texas
	Oscar Parejca (yellow card) 304'; Ariel Graziani 38'; Jason Kreis 74'; Paul Broome (yellow card) 84'	Report	Leonel Alvarez (yellow card) 30'; Johnny Torres 42'; Shaker Asad (yellow card) 55'; Ted Chronopoulos (yellow card) 62'	Stadium: Cotton Bowl; Attendance: 14,758; Referee: Alex Prus

April 15, 2000 5	New England Revolution	2–1 (a.e.t.)	D.C. United	Foxborough, Massachusetts
	Imad Baba 72' 97'; Rusty Pierce (yellow card) 76'	Report	Judah Cooks (yellow card) 3' (yellow card) 33' (red card); Jaime Moreno 19'; Richie Williams (yellow card) 25'; Marco Etcheverry (yellow card) 34'	Stadium: Foxboro Stadium; Attendance: 15,174; Referee: Ali Saheli

April 22, 2000 6	New England Revolution	1–1 (a.e.t.)	Chicago Fire FC	Foxborough, Massachusetts
	Ivan McKinley 68'; Johnny Torres (yellow card) 73'; Mauricio Ramos (yellow card) 99'	Report	Dema Kovalenko 59'; Carlos Rocha (yellow card) 82'	Stadium: Foxboro Stadium; Attendance: 6,737; Referee: Paul Tamberino

April 29, 2000 7	New England Revolution	1–1 (a.e.t.)	Miami Fusion	Foxborough, Massachusetts
	Brian Dunseth 69'; Carlos Parra (yellow card) 90+1'; William Sunsing (yellow card) 98'	Report	Francis Okaroh (yellow card) 25'; Henry Gutierrez (yellow card) 40' (goal) 52'; Jay Heaps (yellow card) 64'	Stadium: Foxboro Stadium; Attendance: 13,172; Referee: Noel Kenny

May 6, 2000 8	New England Revolution	2–1	San Jose Earthquakes	Foxborough, Massachusetts
	Rusty Pierce (yellow card) 14'; Ivan McKinley (yellow card) 42'; Mauricio Ramos 55'; Wolde Harris 58'; Imad Baba (yellow card) 67'; Carlos Parra (yellow card) 86'	Report	Jimmy Conrad (yellow card) 14'; Justin Evans (yellow card) 23'; Abdul Thompson Conteh 72'	Stadium: Foxboro Stadium; Attendance: 14,489; Referee: Rich Grady

May 13, 2000 9	D.C. United	1–3	New England Revolution	Washington, D.C.
	Jaime Moreno 14'; Carey Talley (yellow card) 62'; Tyrone Marshall 46'	Report	Wolde Harris 16'; Mauricio Ramos 66'; Ted Chronopoulos (yellow card) 78'; Imad Baba 83'	Stadium: RFK Stadium; Attendance: 18,493; Referee: Kim Tae-young

May 17, 2000 10	New England Revolution	3–4	Colorado Rapids	Foxborough, Massachusetts
	Ted Chronopoulos 25'; Imad Baba 59'; Wolde Harris 67'; Ted Chronopoulos (yellow card) 81'	Report	Henry Zambrano 39' 84'; Joey DiGiamarino (yellow card) 51'; Scott Vermillion (yellow card) 56'; Jason Bent 79'; Junior Agogo 85'	Stadium: Foxboro Stadium; Attendance: 9,306; Referee: Alex Prus

May 20, 2000 11	Chicago Fire FC	0–1	New England Revolution	Chicago, Illinois
	Carlos Bocanegra (yellow card) 76'; Pitor Nowak (yellow card) 80'; Histro Stoichkov (yellow card) 90+2'; Evan Whitfield (yellow card) 90+3'	Report	Rusty Pierce (yellow card) 10'; Wolde Harris 31'; Ivan McKinley (yellow card) 39'; Johny Torres (yellow card) 80'; Carlos Parra (yellow card) 90+5'	Stadium: Soldier Field; Attendance: 14,077; Referee: Kevin Stott

May 24, 2000 12	New England Revolution	2–1	New England Revolution	Foxborough, Massachusetts
	Ted Chronopoulos 40' 70'; Brian Dunseth (yellow card) 78'; Johnny Torres (yellow card) 80'; Joe Franchino (yellow card) 87'	Report	Ezra Hendrickson (yellow card) 85' (yellow card) 90+2' (red card); Peter Vagenas 90+4'	Stadium: Foxboro Stadium; Attendance: 31,113; Referee: Ted Covaciu

May 29, 2000 13	Colorado Rapids	2–1	New England Revolution	Denver, Colorado
	Henry Zambrano (yellow card) 26'; Junior Agogo 38' 80'; Adin Brown (yellow card) 90+1'	Report	Joe Franchino (yellow card) 35'; Mauricio Ramos (yellow card) 60'; Rusty Pierce (yellow card) 71'; Paul Keegan 90'	Stadium: Mile High Stadium; Attendance: 5,162; Referee: Ali Saheli

June 3, 2000 14	New England Revolution	2–0	Miami Fusion	Foxborough, Massachusetts
	Ted Chronopoulos 72'; Mauricio Wright (yellow card) 77'; John Harkes 90+2'	Report	Roy Lassiter (yellow card) 27'; Leon Cullen (yellow card) 90+1'	Stadium: Foxboro Stadium; Attendance: 16,139; Referee: Brian Hall

June 10, 2000 15	New England Revolution	3–0	San Jose Earthquakes	Foxborough, Massachusetts
	Ted Chronopoulos 28'; Jamar Beasley 74' 88'; Carlos Parra (yellow card) 90+3'	Report	Richard Mulrooney (yellow card) 54'; Abdul Thompson Conteh (yellow card) 77'	Stadium: Foxboro Stadium; Attendance: 14,109; Referee: Brett Hugo

June 17, 2000 16	MetroStars	4–2	New England Revolution	East Rutherford, New Jersey
	Billy Walsh 20'; Clint Mathis (yellow card) 23' (goal) 49'; Tab Ramos (yellow card) 23'; Adolfo Valencia 41'; Steve Shak 43'; Mike Petke (yellow card) 47'; Orlando Perez (yellow card) 74'; Daniel Hernandez (red card) 81'	Report	Leonel Alvarez (yellow card) 6'; Imad Baba 24'; Wolde Harris 29'; Mauricio Wright (yellow card) 35'; Leonel Alvarez (yellow card) 84' (red card); Ivan McKinley (yellow card) 90'	Stadium: Giants Stadium; Attendance: 10,081; Referee: Ricardo Valenzuela

June 21, 2000 17	San Jose Earthquakes	2–2 (a.e.t.)	New England Revolution	San Jose, California
	Wojtek Krakowiak 10' (yellow card) 23'; Joe Cannon (yellow card) 36'; Harut Karapetyan 69'	Report	Carlos Parra (yellow card) 22'; Brian Dunseth (yellow card) 40'; Mauricio Wright (yellow card) 73' (goal) 90+1'; Wolde Harris 79'	Stadium: Spartan Stadium; Attendance: 10,217; Referee: Tim Weyland

June 24, 2000 18	Columbus Crew	3–1	New England Revolution	Columbus, Ohio
	Jason Farrell 15'; John Wilmar Perez (yellow card) 60' (goal) 87'; Jeff Cunningham 69'; Ancil Elcock (yellow card) 85'	Report	Mauricio Ramos 19' (yellow card) 42'	Stadium: Columbus Crew Stadium; Attendance: 15,039; Referee: Reggie Rutty

July 4, 2000 19	Miami Fusion	2–1	New England Revolution	Fort Lauderdale, Florida
	Jay Heaps (yellow card) 19'; Henry Gutierrez 30'; Jim Rooney (yellow card) 32' (goal) 55'; Diego Serna (yellow card) 65'	Report	Wolde Harris 3'; John Harkes (yellow card) 32'; Ivan McKinley (yellow card) 53'	Stadium: Lockhart Stadium; Attendance: 6,239; Referee: Sergio Vega

July 12, 2000 20	Columbus Crew	4–1	New England Revolution	Columbus, Ohio
	Dante Washington 43' 49'; Brian West 74' 89'	Report	Shaker Asad (yellow card) 63'; John Harkes 80'; Mauricio Wright (yellow card) 87'	Stadium: Columbus Crew Stadium; Attendance: 12,998; Referee: Kevin Terry

July 15, 2000 21	New England Revolution	0–2	MetroStars	Foxborough, Massachusetts
	Mauricio Wright (yellow card) 29'; Joe Franchino (yellow card) 66'	Report	Alex Comas 3' (yellow card) 19'; Ramiro Corrales (yellow card) 9'; Mark Chung (yellow card) 20'; Petter Villegas 62'; Billy Walsh (red card) 78'	Stadium: Foxboro Stadium; Attendance: 16,838; Referee: Rich Grady

July 19, 2000 22	Kansas City Wizards	0–1	New England Revolution	Kansas City, Missouri
	Uche Okafor (yellow card) 48'	Report	Leonel Alvarez (yellow card) 8'; William Sunsing (yellow card) 15'; Mauricio Wright (yellow card) 84'; Wolde Harris 85'	Stadium: Arrowhead Stadium; Attendance: 4,582; Referee: Ali Saheli

July 22, 2000 23	San Jose Earthquakes	1–2	New England Revolution	San Jose, California
	Wojtek Krakowiak 46'	Report	William Sunsing 16'; Leonel Alvarez (yellow card) 27'; Wolde Harris 63'	Stadium: Spartan Stadium; Attendance: 7,827; Referee: Noel Kenny

August 2, 2000 24	New England Revolution	1–2	Dallas Burn	Foxborough, Massachusetts
	Leonel Alvarez (yellow card) 38'; Wolde Harris 87'	Report	Ariel Graziani (yellow card) 17'; Bobby Rhine 21'; Chad Deering (yellow card) 23'; Jason Kreis (yellow card) 44' (goal) 67'; Jorge Rodriguez (yellow card) 90+1'	Stadium: Foxboro Stadium; Attendance: 13,910; Referee: Alex Prus

August 5, 2000 25	New England Revolution	1–1 (a.e.t.)	Columbus Crew	Foxborough, Massachusetts
	Wolde Harris (yellow card) 64' (goal) 88'	Report	Mike Lapper (yellow card) 39'; Robert Warzycha 84'; Matt Chulis (yellow card) 87'	Stadium: Foxboro Stadium; Attendance: 19,809; Referee: Noel Kenny

August 12, 2000 26	MetroStars	2–1 (a.e.t.)	New England Revolution	East Rutherford, New Jersey
	Ramiro Corrales (yellow card) 45'; Steve Shak (yellow card) 63' (yellow card) 68' (red card); Adolfo Valencia 88' 93'	Report	Mauricio Wright (yellow card) 44'; Wolde Harris 87'; Jamar Beasley (yellow card) 90+3'	Stadium: Giants Stadium; Attendance: 12,688; Referee: Kevin Terry

August 19, 2000 27	New England Revolution	2–1	Tampa Bay Mutiny	Foxborough, Massachusetts
	Wolde Harris 77'; Imad Baba 88' (yellow card) 90'	Report	Mamadou Diallo (yellow card) 80'; Steve Ralston 81'; Scott Garlick (yellow card) 89'	Stadium: Foxboro Stadium; Attendance: 15,129; Referee: Richard Heron

August 26, 2000 28	New England Revolution	2–1	Columbus Crew	Foxborough, Massachusetts
	Imad Baba 35' (yellow card) 58'; William Sunsing (yellow card) 39' (goal) 51'; Joe Franchino (yellow card) 62'; Adam Eyre (yellow card) 70'	Report	Brian McBride 20'; Jeff Cunningham (yellow card) 44'; Mike Clark (yellow card) 47'; Mike Lapper (yellow card) 56'; Mario Gori (yellow card) 75'	Stadium: Foxboro Stadium; Attendance: 17,867; Referee: Rich Grady

August 30, 2000 29	New England Revolution	1–0	D.C. United	Foxborough, Massachusetts
	Rusty Pierce (yellow card) 41'; Jose Luis Morales 59'	Report	Bobby Convey (yellow card) 39'; Carey Talley (yellow card) 75'	Stadium: Foxboro Stadium; Attendance: 15,489; Referee: Marcel Yonan

September 3, 2000 30	D.C. United	2–0	New England Revolution	Washington, D.C.
	Pete Marino 55' 61' (yellow card) 83'	Report	Johnny Torres (yellow card) 75'	Stadium: RFK Stadium; Attendance: 51,996; Referee: Kevin Stott

September 6, 2000 31	New England Revolution	0–1	Kansas City Wizards	Foxborough, Massachusetts
	Mauricio Wright (yellow card) 32'	Report	Miklos Molnar 50'; Brandon Prideaux (yellow card) 72'; Chris Henderson (yellow card) 75'	Stadium: Foxboro Stadium; Attendance: 7,709; Referee: Gerry Corrie

September 9, 2000 32	New England Revolution	4–3	MetroStars	Foxborough, Massachusetts
	Imad Baba 6'; Joe Franchino 36' 68' (yellow card) 79'; Jamar Beasley 40'; Rusty Pierce (yellow card) 79'	Report	Alex Comas 15' 34' 47' (yellow card) 54'; Clint Mathis (yellow card) 45'; Dahir Mohammed (yellow card) 50'	Stadium: Foxboro Stadium; Attendance: 20,419; Referee: Kevin Stott

=== MLS playoffs ===
September 15, 2000 Quarter-finals	Chicago Fire FC	2–1	New England Revolution	Chicago, Illinois
	Ante Razov (yellow card) 12'; Mauricio Wright 54' (o.g.); Dema Kovalenko 73'	Report	Leonel Alvarez (yellow card) 24'; Wolde Harris 50'; Mauricio Wright (yellow card) 81'; Johnny Torres (yellow card) 90+4'	Stadium: Soldier Field; Attendance: 10,476; Referee: Tim Weyland

September 19, 2000 Quarter-finals	New England Revolution	2–1	Chicago Fire FC	Foxborough, Massachusetts
	Mauricio Wright (yellow card) 11' (goal) 86'; Eric Wynalda 18'; Adam Eyre (yellow card) 45+1'; John Harkes (yellow card) 45+1'; Ted Chronopoulos (yellow card) 45+1'	Report	Diego Gutierrez (yellow card) 73'; Dema Kovalenko 83'	Stadium: Foxboro Stadium; Attendance: 10,723; Referee: Ricardo Valenzuela

September 22, 2000 Quarter-finals	Chicago Fire FC	6–0	New England Revolution	Chicago, Illinois
	Ante Razov 5' 65'; Histro Stoichkov 14' 17' (yellow card) 19'; Dema Kovalenko (yellow card) 22'; DeMarcus Beasley (yellow card) 31'; Pitor Nowak 45+2'; Sam George 75'	Report	Adam Eyre (yellow card) 16'; Imad Baba (yellow card) 23'	Stadium: Soldier Field; Attendance: 5,972; Referee: Kevin Stott

=== U.S. Open Cup ===
June 14, 2000 Second Round	New England Revolution	0–1	Mid-Michigan Bucks	Foxborough, Massachusetts
		Report	Chad Schomaker 90'	Stadium: Foxboro Stadium; Attendance: 1,857; Referee: Gus St. Silva
