= 1999 San Jose Clash season =

San Jose Clash
1999 season
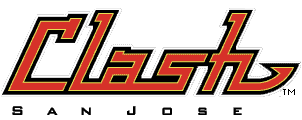
- Owner: Kraft Sports Group
- Coach: Brian Quinn
- Stadium: Spartan Stadium
- Major League Soccer: Division: 5th Overall: 7th
- MLS Cup: Did not qualify
- U.S. Open Cup: Did not qualify
- California Clásico: 2nd
- Top goalscorer: Ronald Cerritos (15)

The 1999 San Jose Clash season was the fourth season of the team's existence. The San Jose Clash were purchased and owned by the Kraft Group Sports on November 18, 1999. San Jose revamped their roster for the 1999 season adding an influx of youth utilizing the draft with Jamie Clark, Jimmy Conrad, Scott Bower, Caleb Porter, Maxi Viera, Carlos Farias and Anthony Farace. They also picked up Joe Cannon, Leighton O'Brien, Adam Frye and Joey Martinez. The team set an MLS best in shootouts with 11 wins in 1999.

== Squad ==
=== Current squad ===
Note: Flags indicate national team as defined under FIFA eligibility rules; some limited exceptions apply. Players may hold more than one non-FIFA nationality.

| No. | Pos. | Nation | Player |
|---|---|---|---|
| 0 | GK | USA | Joe Cannon |
| 1 | GK | USA | David Kramer |
| 3 | DF | USA | John Doyle |
| 4 | MF | USA | Leighton O'Brien |
| 5 | MF | USA | Caleb Porter |
| 6 | DF | USA | Joey Martinez |
| 7 | FW | USA | Braeden Cloutier |
| 8 | FW | USA | Jeff Baicher |
| 9 | MF | USA | Scott Bower |
| 10 | FW | SLV | Raúl Díaz Arce |
| 12 | DF | USA | Adam Frye |
| 13 | MF | USA | Ryan Tinsley |
| 13 | DF | USA | Sean Henderson |
| 14 | FW | USA | Esmundo Rodriguez |
| 16 | DF | USA | Tim Weaver |
| 17 | DF | USA | Jimmy Conrad |

| No. | Pos. | Nation | Player |
|---|---|---|---|
| 18 | GK | USA | J.J.Wozniak |
| 19 | DF | CRC | Mauricio Wright |
| 20 | FW | SLV | Ronald Cerritos |
| 21 | MF | USA | Eddie Lewis |
| 22 | FW | CHI | Carlos Farias |
| 22 | FW | CRC | Alejandro Sequeira |
| 23 | MF | CRC | Mauricio Solís |
| 23 | MF | URU | Maxi Viera |
| 24 | DF | USA | Wade Barrett |
| 26 | DF | USA | Jamie Clark |
| 27 | MF | USA | Dario Brose |
| 29 | FW | USA | Anthony Farace |
| 30 | MF | USA | Richard Mulrooney |
| 32 | GK | USA | David Winner |
| NA | DF | USA | Todd Duncan |
| NA | FW | USA | Mark Beana |

== Competitions ==
=== Major League Soccer ===
==== Standings ====
===== Western Conference =====
| Pos | Team | Pld | W | SOW | L | GF | GA | GD | Pts | Qualification |
|---|---|---|---|---|---|---|---|---|---|---|
| 1 | Los Angeles Galaxy | 32 | 17 | 3 | 12 | 49 | 29 | +20 | 54 | MLS Cup Playoffs |
| 2 | Dallas Burn | 32 | 16 | 3 | 13 | 54 | 35 | +19 | 51 | MLS Cup Playoffs |
| 3 | Chicago Fire | 32 | 15 | 3 | 14 | 51 | 36 | +15 | 48 | MLS Cup Playoffs |
| 4 | Colorado Rapids | 32 | 14 | 6 | 12 | 38 | 39 | −1 | 48 | MLS Cup Playoffs |
| 5 | San Jose Clash | 32 | 9 | 10 | 13 | 48 | 49 | −1 | 37 | |
| 6 | Kansas City Wizards | 32 | 6 | 2 | 24 | 33 | 53 | −20 | 20 | |

Source: MLS

===== Overall Table =====
| Pos | Team | Pld | W | SOW | L | GF | GA | GD | Pts |
|---|---|---|---|---|---|---|---|---|---|
| 5 | Colorado Rapids | 32 | 14 | 6 | 12 | 38 | 39 | −1 | 48 |
| 6 | Columbus Crew | 32 | 13 | 6 | 13 | 48 | 39 | +9 | 45 |
| 7 | San Jose Clash | 32 | 9 | 10 | 13 | 48 | 49 | −1 | 37 |
| 8 | Tampa Bay Mutiny | 32 | 9 | 5 | 18 | 51 | 50 | +1 | 32 |
| 9 | Miami Fusion | 32 | 8 | 5 | 19 | 42 | 59 | −17 | 29 |

Source: MLS
Rules for classification: 1) points; 2) head-to-head record; 3) goal difference; 4) number of goals scored

==== Matches ====
| March 20, 1999 | San Jose Clash | 1–3 | Chicago Fire | San Jose, California |
| | Baicher 32' | Report | Razov 58'; Podbrożny 68'; Razov 81' | Stadium: Spartan Stadium; Attendance: 15,238 |

| March 27, 1999 | San Jose Clash | 2–2 (3–4 SO) | Colorado Rapids | San Jose, California |
| | Lewis 59'; Clark 81' | Report | Bravo 18', 48' | Stadium: Spartan Stadium; Attendance: 8,841 |

| April 3, 1999 | San Jose Clash | 1–1 (2–1 SO) | Los Angeles Galaxy | San Jose, California |
| | Díaz Arce 9' | Report | Mathis 86' | Stadium: Spartan Stadium; Attendance: 12,017 |

| April 10, 1999 | Kansas City Wizards | 1–1 (0–2 SO) | San Jose Clash | Kansas City, Missouri |
| | Brown 87' | Report | Cerritos 43' | Stadium: Arrowhead Stadium; Attendance: 4,815 |

| April 17, 1999 | D.C. United | 1–1 (4–2 SO) | San Jose Clash | Washington, D.C. |
| | Aunger 4' | Report | Cerritos 11' | Stadium: RFK Stadium; Attendance: 35,167 |

| April 24, 1999 | Los Angeles Galaxy | 1–0 | San Jose Clash | Pasadena, California |
| | Caligiuri 58' | Report | | Stadium: Rose Bowl; Attendance: 16,700 |

| April 30, 1999 | San Jose Clash | 1–1 (3–2 SO) | Dallas Burn | San Jose, California |
| | Cerritos 14' | Report | Suarez 7' | Stadium: Spartan Stadium; Attendance: 10,071 |

| May 9, 1999 | San Jose Clash | 1–2 | Columbus Crew | San Jose, California |
| | Clark 38' | Report | Cunningham 17', 70' | Stadium: Spartan Stadium; Attendance: 9,931 |

| May 15, 1999 | Dallas Burn | 2–1 | San Jose Clash | Dallas, Texas |
| | Rhine 9', 65' | Report | Barrett 32' | Stadium: Cotton Bowl; Attendance: 16,372 |

| May 22, 1999 | San Jose Clash | 1–1 (3–1 SO) | Dallas Burn | San Jose, California |
| | Cerritos 10' | Report | Kreis 81' | Stadium: Spartan Stadium; Attendance: 12,133 |

| May 27, 1999 | Colorado Rapids | 4–2 | San Jose Clash | Denver, Colorado |
| | Harris 20'; Clark 54' (o.g.); Paule 58'; Dely Valdés 73' | Report | Cerritos 1'; Lewis 63' | Stadium: Mile High Stadium; Attendance: 4,746; Referee: Richard Heron |

| June 3, 1999 | San Jose Clash | 4–3 | Colorado Rapids | San Jose, California |
| | Lewis 8'; Baicher 73'; Cerritos 77'; Wright 80' | Report | Paule 40'; Bravo 44'; Limpar 69' | Stadium: Spartan Stadium; Attendance: 6,824 |

| June 12, 1999 | San Jose Clash | 1–1 (1–0 SO) | Tampa Bay Mutiny | San Jose, California |
| | Moore 35' (o.g.) | Report | Ralston 39' | Stadium: Spartan Stadium; Attendance: 14,472 |

| June 19, 1999 | Chicago Fire | 2–0 | San Jose Clash | Chicago |
| | Kubík 34'; Podbrożny 73' | Report | | Stadium: Soldier Field; Attendance: 13,141 |

| June 26, 1999 | Miami Fusion | 1–2 | San Jose Clash | Fort Lauderdale, Florida |
| | Wélton 12' | Report | Baicher 21'; Díaz Arce 35' | Stadium: Lockhart Stadium; Attendance: 7,287 |

| June 30, 1999 | Columbus Crew | 3–3 (2–1 SO) | San Jose Clash | Columbus, Ohio |
| | Elcock 37'; John 79', 90' | Report | Cerritos 25', 69'; Díaz Arce 83' | Stadium: Columbus Crew Stadium; Attendance: 15,397 |

| July 4, 1999 | San Jose Clash | 1–1 (3–2 SO) | D.C. United | Stanford, California |
| | Cerritos 44' | Report | Wood 10' | Stadium: Stanford Stadium; Attendance: 73,123; Referee: Brian Hall |

| July 8, 1999 | Tampa Bay Mutiny | 2–1 | San Jose Clash | Tampa, Florida |
| | Quill 2'; McCarty 88' | Report | Díaz Arce 19' | Stadium: Raymond James Stadium; Attendance: 8,455 |

| July 23, 1999 | Chicago Fire | 2–2 (0–2 SO) | San Jose Clash | Chicago |
| | Razov 30'; Wolff 55' | Report | Brose 73'; Mulrooney 81' | Stadium: Soldier Field; Attendance: 8,329; Referee: Andrew Barnes |

| July 31, 1999 | Kansas City Wizards | 2–2 (2–1 SO) | San Jose Clash | Kansas City, Missouri |
| | Preki 35', 70' | Report | Solís 14'; Wright 85' | Stadium: Arrowhead Stadium; Attendance: 9,014; Referee: Kazuhiko Matsumura |

| August 7, 1999 | San Jose Clash | 1–4 | Los Angeles Galaxy | San Jose, California |
| | Cloutier 84' | Report | Ibsen 14'; Jones 74'; Cienfuegos 79'; George 82' | Stadium: Spartan Stadium; Attendance: 15,648 |

| August 12, 1999 | New England Revolution | 1–2 | San Jose Clash | Foxborough, Massachusetts |
| | Chronopoulos 6' | Report | Doyle 54'; Brose 77' | Stadium: Foxboro Stadium; Attendance: 13,427 |

| August 21, 1999 | San Jose Clash | 2–1 | New England Revolution | San Jose, California |
| | Cerritos 14'; Sequeira 63' | Report | Moore 37' | Stadium: Spartan Stadium; Attendance: 10,112 |

| August 28, 1999 | San Jose Clash | 1–1 (4–3 SO) | MetroStars | San Jose, California |
| | Cerritos 90' | Report | Walsh 9' | Stadium: Spartan Stadium; Attendance: 9,492; Referee: Andrew Barnes |

| September 1, 1999 | Los Angeles Galaxy | 3–1 | San Jose Clash | Pasadena, California |
| | Myers 2', 58'; Vanney 71' | Report | Sequeira 59' | Stadium: Rose Bowl; Attendance: 8,662 |

| September 4, 1999 | San Jose Clash | 2–0 | Kansas City Wizards | San Jose, California |
| | Sequeira 5'; Conrad 78' | Report | | Stadium: Spartan Stadium; Attendance: 9,296 |

| September 11, 1999 | Dallas Burn | 1–0 | San Jose Clash | Dallas, Texas |
| | Kreis 78' | Report | | Stadium: Cotton Bowl; Attendance: 15,584 |

| September 19, 1999 | San Jose Clash | 6–1 | Miami Fusion | San Jose, California |
| | Cerritos 35', 51'; Brose 45'; Lewis 48'; Wright 68'; Jair 78' | Report | Gutierrez 59' | Stadium: Spartan Stadium; Attendance: 13,067 |

| September 22, 1999 | MetroStars | 1–2 | San Jose Clash | East Rutherford, New Jersey |
| | Zambrano 35' | Report | Brose 12'; Cerritos 53' | Stadium: Giants Stadium; Attendance: 7,215 |

| September 26, 1999 | San Jose Clash | 2–0 | Chicago Fire | San Jose, California |
| | Cerritos 74'; Tinsley 85' | Report | | Stadium: Spartan Stadium; Attendance: 11,124 |

| October 1, 1999 | Colorado Rapids | 0–0 (3–0 SO) | San Jose Clash | Denver, Colorado |
| | | Report | | Stadium: Mile High Stadium; Attendance: 11,100 |

| October 6, 1999 | San Jose Clash | 1–0 | Kansas City Wizards | San Jose, California |
| | Solís 54' | Report | | Stadium: Spartan Stadium; Attendance: 7,961 |

(SO) = Shootout
