= Fabio Zúñiga =

Fabio Zúñiga is the name of:

- Fabio Zúñiga (footballer, born 1979), Colombian footballer
- Fabio Zúñiga (soccer) (born 1981), American soccer player
