= 1999 MLS supplemental draft =

College draft for soccer teams

The 1999 Major League Soccer supplemental draft took place in Fort Lauderdale on the afternoon of Sunday, February 7. The second and third rounds of the 1999 MLS College Draft had taken place earlier that morning. In this supplemental draft, a number of teams passed in the second and third rounds. Consequently in 2000, MLS merged the college and supplemental draft into the 2000 MLS SuperDraft.

== Round 1 ==
Pick #	MLS team	Player	Position	Affiliation
1	Los Angeles Galaxy (Note: #1: New England Revolution → Los Angeles Galaxy. 5 January 1999: Los Angeles Galaxy acquired this first-round selection and a second-round selection in the 1999 MLS College Draft from New England Revolution in exchange for defender Dan Calichman.)	Gabe Eastman	D	Nashville Metros, Modesto Junior College
2	Kansas City Wizards	Brandon Prideaux	D	Seattle Sounders, University of Washington
3	San Jose Clash	Adam Frye	D	Tampa Bay Mutiny, UCLA
4	MetroStars (Note: #4: Tampa Bay Mutiny → D.C. United → MetroStars. 7 February 1999: MetroStars acquired this first-round pick from D.C. United in exchange for a first-round selection in the 2000 Supplemental Draft. The 2000 draft pick was converted to a fourth-round selection in the 2000 MLS SuperDraft when the Supplemental Draft was abolished. On 19 January 1999, D.C. has acquired this first-round pick and a third-round selection (#28) in the 1999 MLS College Draft from Tampa Bay Mutiny in exchange for goalkeeper Scott Garlick.)	Petter Villegas	M	New Jersey Stallions, Kean University
5	Miami Fusion	Dusty Hudock	GK	Seattle Sounders, University of Washington
6	Dallas Burn	Kirk Wilson	M	El Paso Patriots, Drake University
7	Colorado Rapids (Note: #7: MetroStars → Colorado Rapids. 8 March 1998: Colorado Rapids acquired this first-round pick from MetroStars in exchange for forward Steve Rammel.)	Kevin Anderson	M	Minnesota Thunder, Southern Connecticut State University
8	Colorado Rapids	Darren Sawatzky	F	Hershey Wildcats, University of Portland
9	Columbus Crew	Michael Butler	F	Western Mass Pioneers, UMass Minutemen
10	Los Angeles Galaxy	Orlando Perez	D	Orange County Zodiac
11	San Jose Clash (Note: #11: D.C. United → San Jose Clash. 28 January 1999: San Jose Clash acquired this first-round pick and a second-round selection in the 1999 MLS College Draft from D.C. United in exchange for financial considerations.)	Maxi Viera	M	Detroit Rockers
12	Chicago Fire	Tomasz Wygonik	D	Central Jersey Riptide

== Round 2 ==
Pick #	MLS team	Player	Position	Affiliation
13	New England Revolution	Chris Fox	D	Richmond Kickers, Brown University
14	Kansas City Wizards	Ryan Turner	M	University of Notre Dame
15	San Jose Clash	Carlos Farias	F	San Diego Flash
16	Tampa Bay Mutiny	PASS		
17	Miami Fusion	Juan Ramos	D	Jacksonville Cyclones, Nova Southeastern University
18	Dallas Burn	Gabe Jones	F	Austin Lone Stars, St. Edward's University
19	Miami Fusion (Note: #19: MetroStars → Miami Fusion. 1 February 1998: Miami Fusion acquired this second-round selection from MetroStars in exchange for a second-round pick (#14) in the 1998 MLS Supplemental Draft.)	PASS		
20	Colorado Rapids	David Winner	GK	Miami Fusion, University of Tampa
21	Columbus Crew	John DeBrito	M	Kansas City Wizards, Southern Connecticut State University
22	Los Angeles Galaxy	John Jones	M	Nashville Metros, Sacramento State
23	Dallas Burn (Note: #23: D.C. United → Dallas Burn. 18 January 1999: Dallas Burn acquired this second-round selection and a third-round pick (#35) in the 1999 MLS College Draft from D.C. United in exchange for defender Brian Bates.)	PASS		
24	Chicago Fire	PASS		

== Round 3 ==
Pick #	MLS team	Player	Position	Affiliation
25	New England Revolution	PASS		
26	Kansas City Wizards	PASS		
27	San Jose Clash	Anthony Farace	F	San Diego Flash
28	Tampa Bay Mutiny	PASS		
29	Miami Fusion	PASS		
30	Dallas Burn	PASS		
31	MetroStars	Nansha Kalonji	D	Central Jersey Riptide, Ramapo College
32	Colorado Rapids	Tim Martin	D	San Jose Clash, Fresno State
33	Columbus Crew	Craig Yacks	M	Cincinnati Riverhawks, Yale University
34	Miami Fusion (Note: #34: Los Angeles Galaxy → Miami Fusion. 1 February 1998: Miami Fusion acquired this third-round selection from Los Angeles Galaxy in exchange for a third-round pick (#26) in the 1998 MLS Supplemental Draft.)	PASS		
35	D.C. United	PASS		
36	Chicago Fire	PASS		

== Unresolved 1999 Supplemental Draft trades ==
- 4 February 1998: D.C. United traded Raul Diaz Arce and third round pick in 1999 college draft to New England Revolution for first round pick in 1999 supplemental draft, and first round and second round picks in 1999 college draft.
