= 2001 MLS SuperDraft =

College draft for soccer teams

General information
- Sport: Soccer
- Date(s): February 5, 2001
- Location: Davie, Florida

Overview
- 72 total selections
- First selection: Chris Carrieri, San Jose Earthquakes
- Most selections: Dallas Burn (8 selections)

The 2001 Major League Soccer SuperDraft was held on February 5, 2001, at the Signature Grand in Davie, Florida.

== Player selection ==
Key

*	Denotes a player contracted under the Project-40 program
§	Denotes a player who won the MLS Rookie of the Year
^	Denotes player who has been selected to an MLS All-Star Game
†	Denotes player who has been selected for an MLS Best XI team
~	Denotes a player who won the MLS MVP

== Round 1 ==
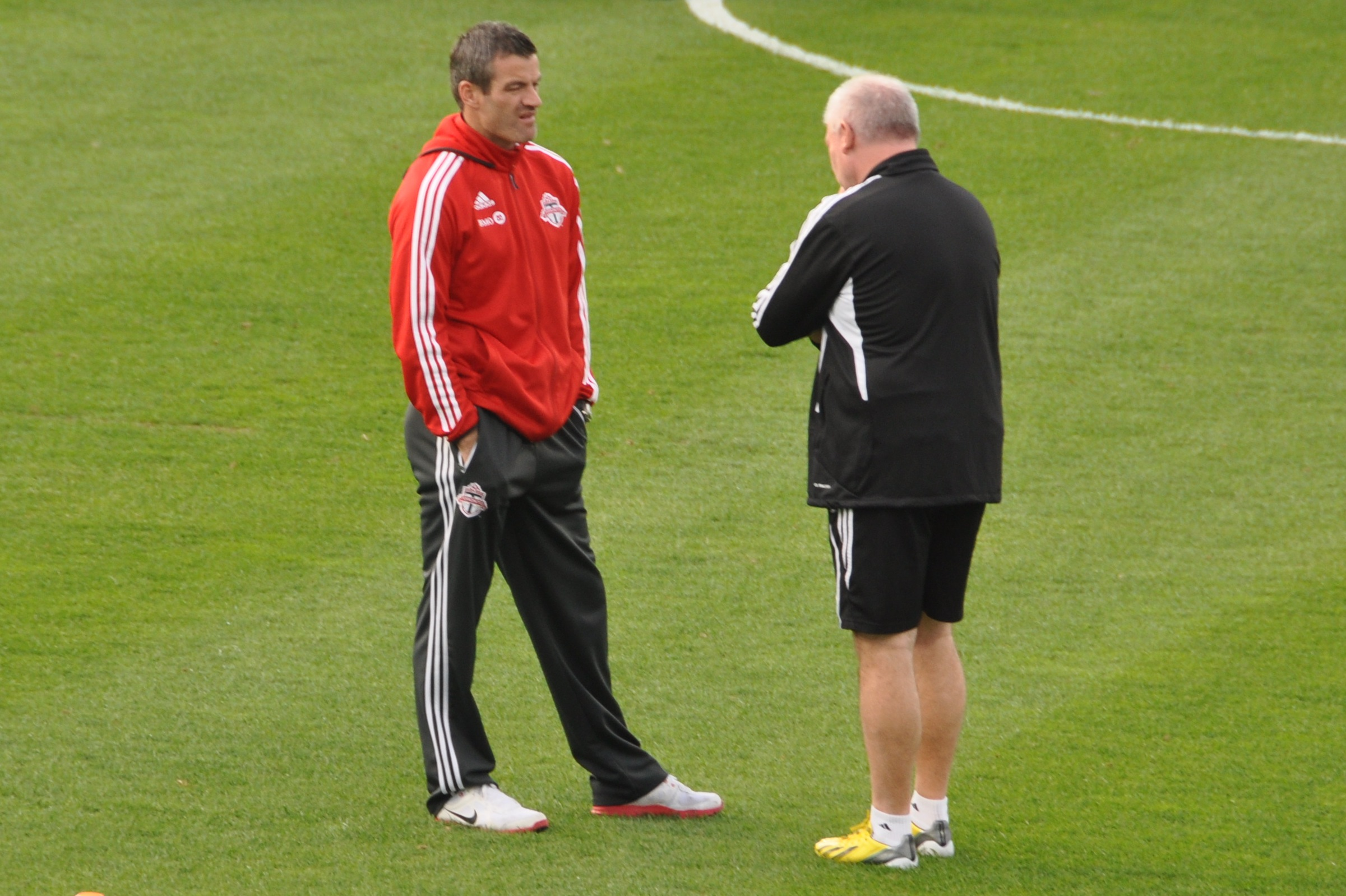
D.C. United selected Ryan Nelsen 4th overall. Nelsen is a 2x MLS Best XI selection. He earned 49 caps for the New Zealand Men's National Team and was selected to the 2010 FIFA World Cup squad.

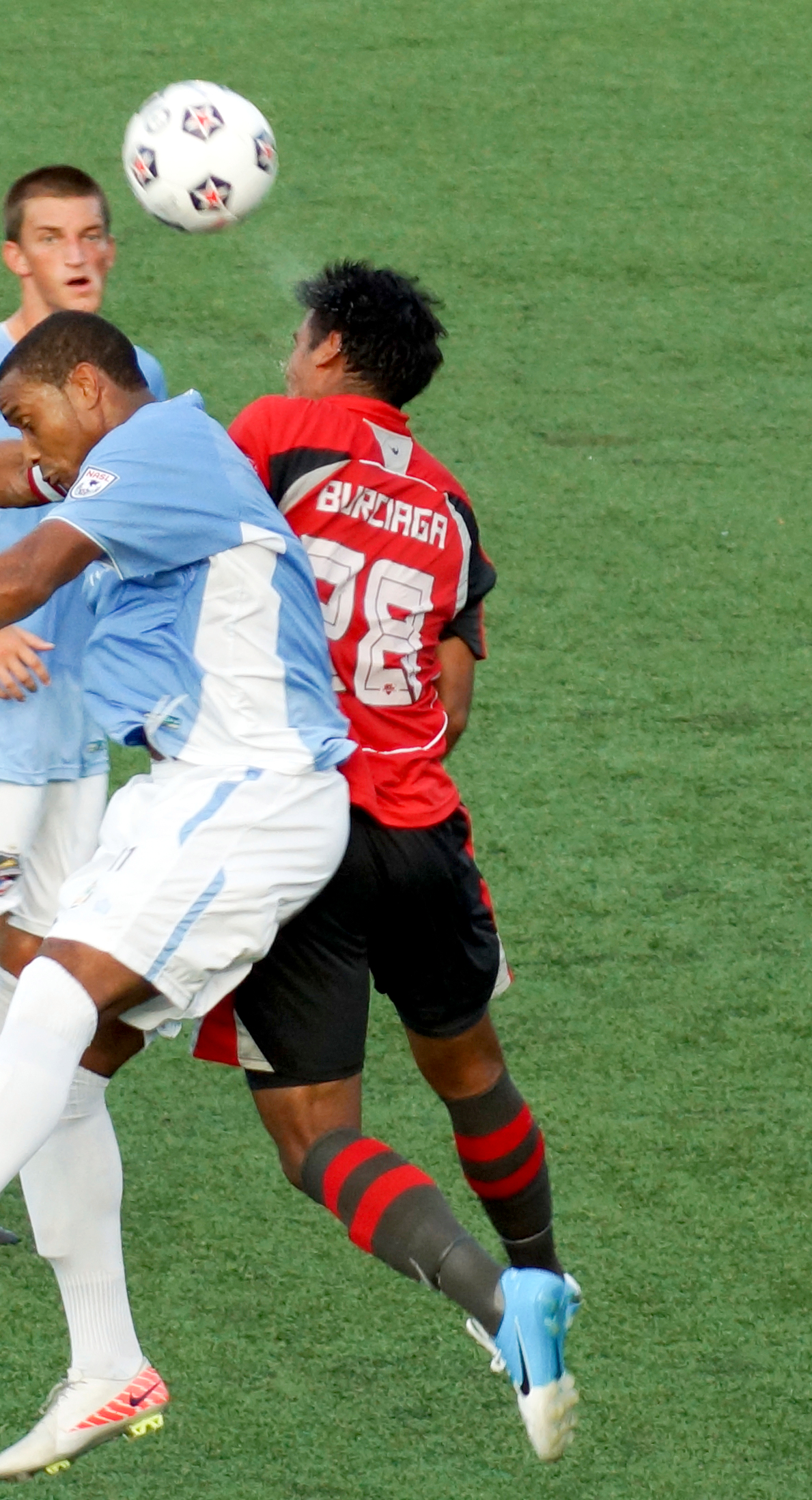
The Kansas City Wizards selected José Burciaga Jr. 12th overall. He is a 2006 MLS Best XI selection and won the 2008 MLS Humanitarian of the Year Award.

Pick #	MLS team	Player	Position	Affiliation
1	San Jose Earthquakes	Chris Carrieri*	F	University of North Carolina
2	Tampa Bay Mutiny (Note: #2: D.C. United → Tampa Bay Mutiny. 26 May 2000: Tampa Bay Mutiny acquired this first-round pick, another first-round selection (#6) in the 2001 SuperDraft, a second-round selection in the 2002 MLS SuperDraft, and midfielder John Maessner from D.C. United in exchange for forward Raúl Díaz Arce and forward Pete Marino.)	Ali Curtis	F	Duke University
3	D.C. United (Note: #3: Columbus Crew → D.C. United. 5 February 2001: D.C. United acquired this first-round selection from Columbus Crew in exchange for the #10 pick in the 2001 SuperDraft and goalkeeper Tom Presthus.)	Mark Lisi	M	Clemson University
4	D.C. United (Note: #4: Miami Fusion → D.C. United. 3 February 2001: D.C. United acquired this first-round pick and midfielder Brian Kamler from Miami Fusion in exchange for defender Carlos Llamosa.)	Ryan Nelsen†	M	Stanford University
5	Dallas Burn (Note: #5: Colorado Rapids → Dallas Burn. 6 February 2000: Dallas Burn acquired this first-round pick and a first-round selection (#5) in the 2000 MLS SuperDraft from Colorado Rapids in exchange for the #3 pick in the 2000 SuperDraft.)	Joselito Vaca	M	Oriente Petrolero
6	Tampa Bay Mutiny (Note: #6: New England Revolution. → Colorado Rapids → D.C. United → Tampa Bay Mutiny. 26 May 2000: Tampa Bay Mutiny acquired this first-round pick, another first-round selection (#2) in the 2001 SuperDraft, a second-round selection in the 2002 MLS SuperDraft, and midfielder John Maessner from D.C. United in exchange for forward Raúl Díaz Arce and forward Pete Marino. On 18 February 2000, D.C. had acquired this pick from Colorado Rapids in exchange for midfielder Jason Moore. More information needed.)	Craig Demmin	D	Rochester Rhinos (A-League)
7	Dallas Burn	Ryan Suarez^	D	San Jose State University
8	D.C. United (Note: #8: Tampa Bay Mutiny → New England Revolution → San Jose Earthquakes → D.C. United. 4 February 2001: D.C. United acquired this first-round selection, the #10 pick in the 2001 SuperDraft, and forward Abdul Thompson Conteh from San Jose Earthquakes in exchange for defender Jeff Agoos. On 30 May 2000, San Jose had acquired this pick, defender Mike Burns, and defender Dan Calichman from New England Revolution in exchange for defender Mauricio Wright. On 6 December 1999, New England had acquired this pick and midfielder Mauricio Ramos from Tampa Bay Mutiny in exchange for a player allocation.)	Santino Quaranta*	F	Nike Project-40
9	Los Angeles Galaxy	Brian Mullan	M	Creighton University
10	Columbus Crew (Note: #10: MetroStars → San Jose Earthquakes → D.C. United → Columbus Crew. 5 February 2001: Columbus Crew acquired this first-round selection and goalkeeper Tom Presthus from D.C. United in exchange for the #3 pick in the 2001 SuperDraft. On 4 February 2001, D.C. United had acquired this selection, the #8 pick in the 2001 SuperDraft, and forward Abdul Thompson Conteh from San Jose Earthquakes in exchange for defender Jeff Agoos. On 3 November 2000, San Jose had acquired this selection from MetroStars in exchange for a second-round selection in the 2001 SuperDraft and defender Francis Okaroh.)	Duncan Oughton	F	Cal State-Fullerton
11	Los Angeles Galaxy (Note: #11: Chicago Fire → Los Angeles Galaxy. 6 February 2000: Los Angeles Galaxy acquired this first-round pick and a first-round selection in the 2000 MLS SuperDraft from Chicago Fire in exchange for midfielder DaMarcus Beasley.)	Isaias Bardales*	F	San Jose State University
12	Kansas City Wizards	Jose Burciaga*†	D	Nike Project-40

== Round 2 ==
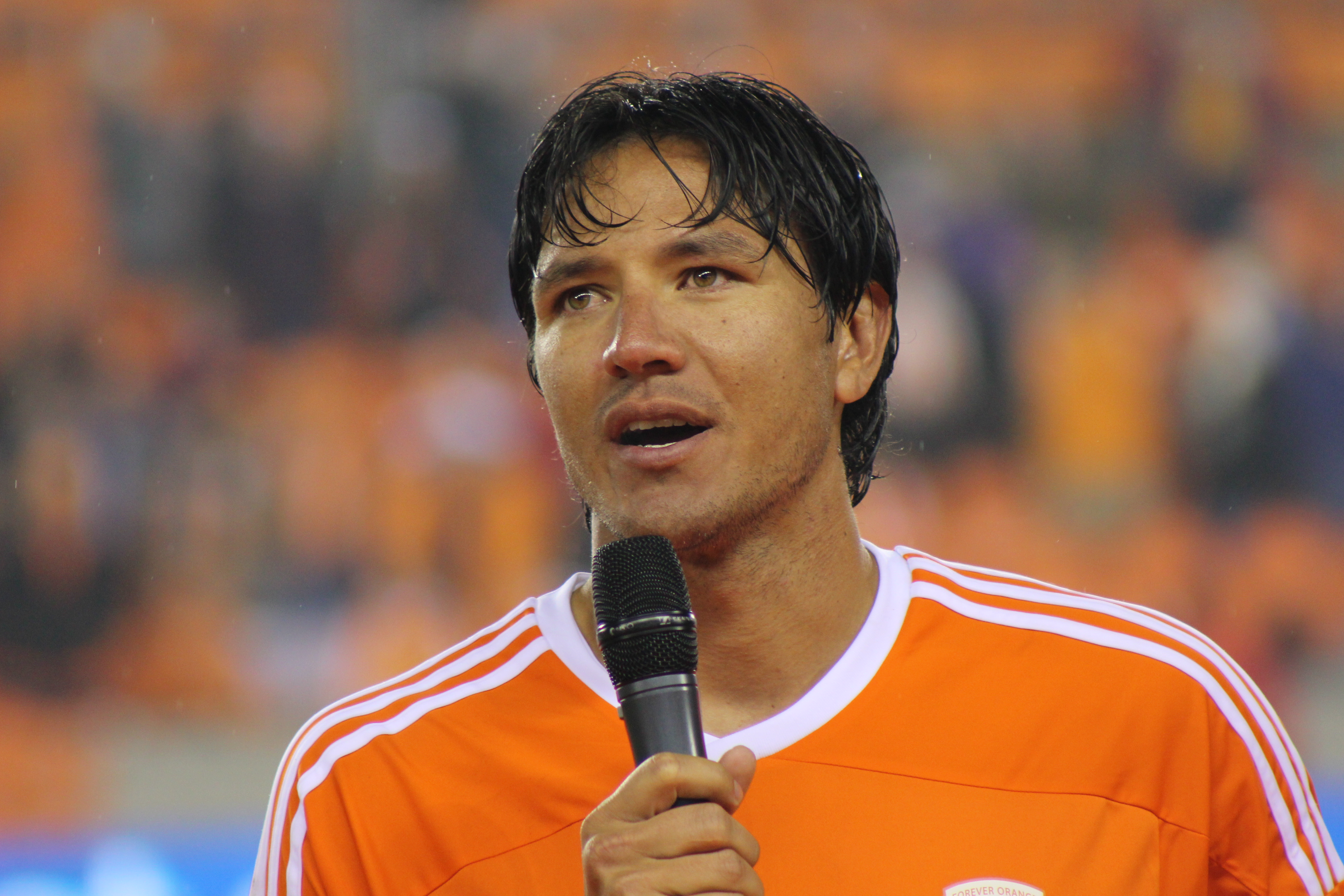
The LA Galaxy selected Brian Ching 16th overall. In 2004, he won the MLS Comeback Player of the Year Award and was named to the MLS Best XI. He earned 45 caps for the US Men's National Team and was selected to the 2006 FIFA World Cup squad.

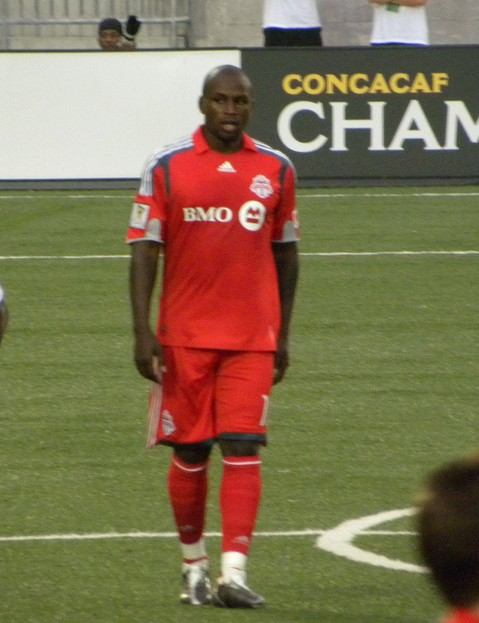
The Miami Fusion selected Ali Gerba 18th overall. Gerba earned 31 caps with the Canada Men's National Team.

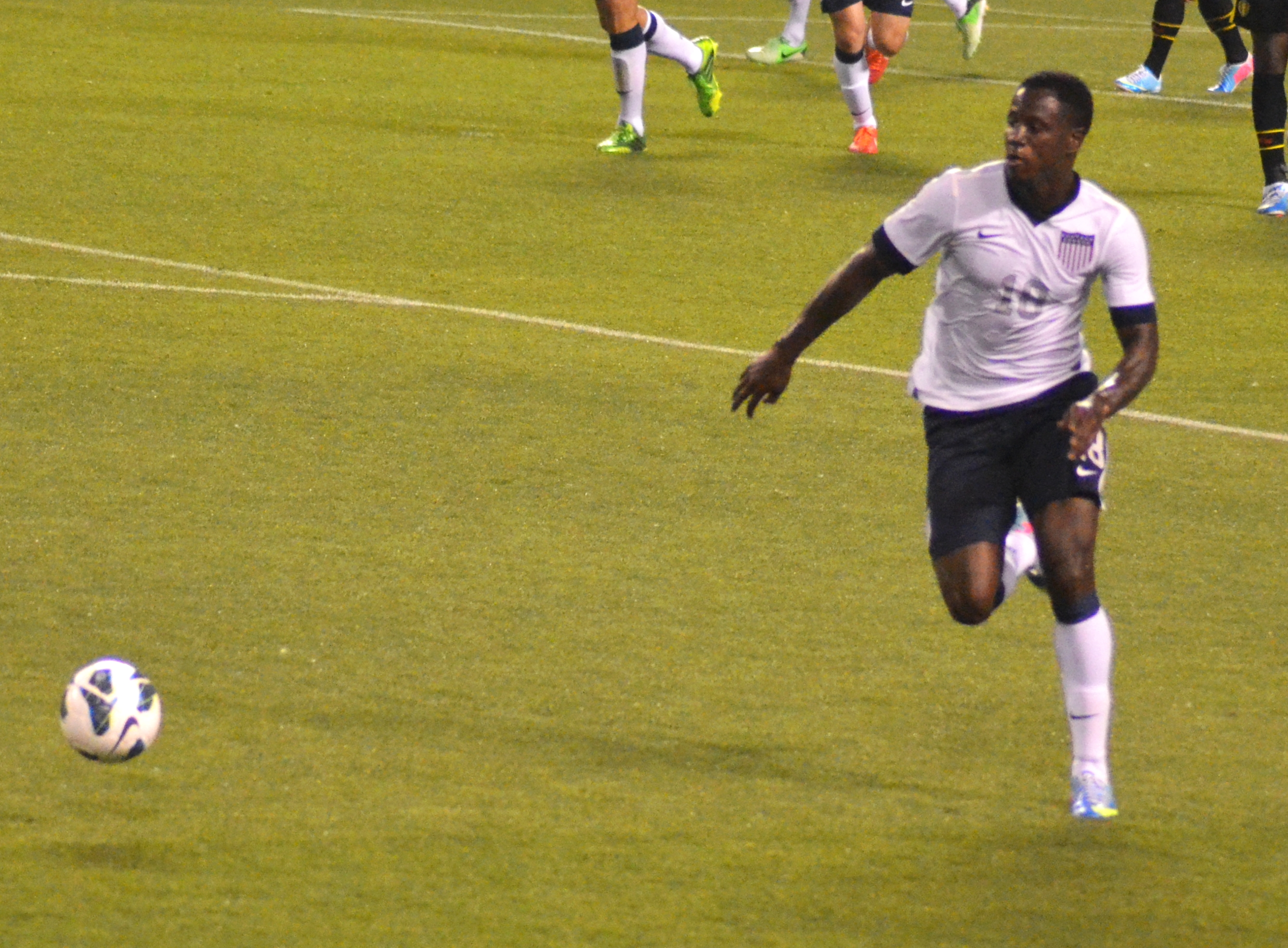
The Dallas Burn selected Eddie Johnson 19th overall. He was named the 2007 and 2012 MLS Comeback Player of the Year. Johnson earned 63 caps for the US Men's National Team and was selected to the 2006 FIFA World Cup squad.

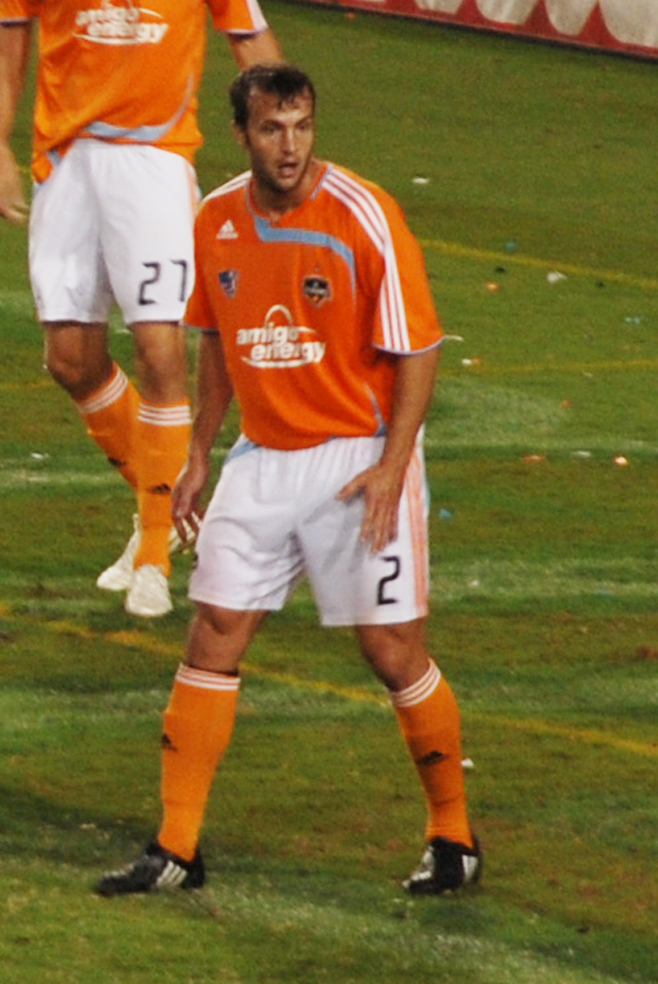
San Jose selected Eddie Robinson 20th overall. He was named to the 2007 MLS Best XI.

Pick #	MLS team	Player	Position	Affiliation
13	MetroStars (Note: #13: San Jose Earthquakes → MetroStars. 3 November 2000: MetroStars acquired this second-round selection and defender Francis Okaroh from San Jose Earthquakes in exchange for a first-round selection in the 2001 SuperDraft.)	Rodrigo Faria§	F	MetroStars Black
14	Tampa Bay Mutiny (Note: #14: D.C. United → San Jose Earthquakes → Tampa Bay Mutiny. 5 February 2001: Tampa Bay Mutiny acquired this second-round pick and a third-round selection (#34) in the 2001 SuperDraft from San Jose Earthquakes in exchange for midfielder Manny Lagos. On 6 February 2000, San Jose had acquired this pick and a second-round selection in the 2000 MLS SuperDraft from D.C. United in exchange for a second-round pick in the 2000 SuperDraft.)	Devin Barclay*	F	Nike Project-40
15	D.C. United (Note: #15: Columbus Crew → MetroStars → D.C. United. 4 February 2001: D.C. United acquired this second-round pick and goalkeeper Mike Ammann from MetroStars in exchange for a third-round selection (#26) in the 2001 SuperDraft, midfielder Richie Williams, and an allocation. On 3 May 2000, MetroStars had acquired this pick from Columbus Crew in exchange for midfielder Miles Joseph.)	Bryan Namoff	M	Bradley University
16	Los Angeles Galaxy (Note: #16: Miami Fusion → Chicago Fire → San Jose Earthquakes → Los Angeles Galaxy. 4 February 2001: Los Angeles Galaxy acquired this second-round pick from San Jose Earthquakes in change for defender Zak Ibsen. On 15 March 2000, San Jose had acquired this pick, another second-round selection (#20) in the 2001 SuperDraft, a first-round selection in the 2002 MLS SuperDraft, and future considerations from Chicago Fire in exchange for an allocation. Chicago used the allocation to sign Hristo Stoichkov. On 10 March 2000, Chicago had acquired this pick and a conditional draft pick from Miami Fusion in exchange for defender Francis Okaroh. It is believed that the conditions to activate the conditional draft pick were not met.)	Brian Ching†	F	Spokane Shadow (PDL)
17	Colorado Rapids	Stephen Herdsman	D	West Michigan Edge (PDL)
18	Miami Fusion (Note: #18: Pick originally belonged to New England Revolution. → Colorado Rapids → D.C. United → Miami Fusion. 5 February 2001: Miami Fusion acquired this second-round pick from D.C. United in exchange for a second-round selection in the 2002 MLS SuperDraft. Earlier the same day, D.C. had acquired this pick from Colorado Rapids in exchange for a third-round pick (#36) in the 2001 SuperDraft and defender Geoff Aunger. More information needed.)	Ali Gerba	F	Montreal Impact (A-League)
19	Dallas Burn	Eddie Johnson*^	F	Nike Project-40
20	San Jose Earthquakes (Note: #20: Pick originally belonged to Tampa Bay Mutiny. → Chicago Fire → San Jose Earthquakes. 15 March 2000: San Jose Earthquakes acquired this second-round pick, another second-round selection (#16) in the 2001 SuperDraft, a first-round selection in the 2002 MLS SuperDraft, and future considerations from Chicago Fire in exchange for an allocation. Chicago used the allocation to sign Hristo Stoichkov. More information needed.)	Eddie Robinson^†	M	University of North Carolina
21	New England Revolution (Note: #21: Los Angeles Galaxy → Miami Fusion → New England Revolution. 8 July 2000: New England Revolution acquired this second-round selection, originally "future considerations", and forward Eric Wynalda from Miami Fusion in exchange for midfielder Ivan McKinley. The future considerations became this draft pick when Wynalda did not agree to a new contract with New England prior to the 2001 SuperDraft. On 6 February 2000, Miami had acquired this pick and a third-round selection in the 2000 MLS SuperDraft from Los Angeles Galaxy in exchange for a third-round pick in the 2000 SuperDraft.)	Nick Downing*	D	University of Maryland
22	Los Angeles Galaxy (Note: #22: MetroStars → Los Angeles Galaxy. 19 April 2000: Los Angeles Galaxy acquired this second-round selection from MetroStars in exchange for defender Steve Jolley.)	Robbie Russell	M	Duke University
23	Chicago Fire	Justin Evans	M	Pittsburgh Riverhounds (A-League)
24	Kansas City Wizards	Andrew Gregor	M	Seattle Sounders (A-League)

== Round 3 ==
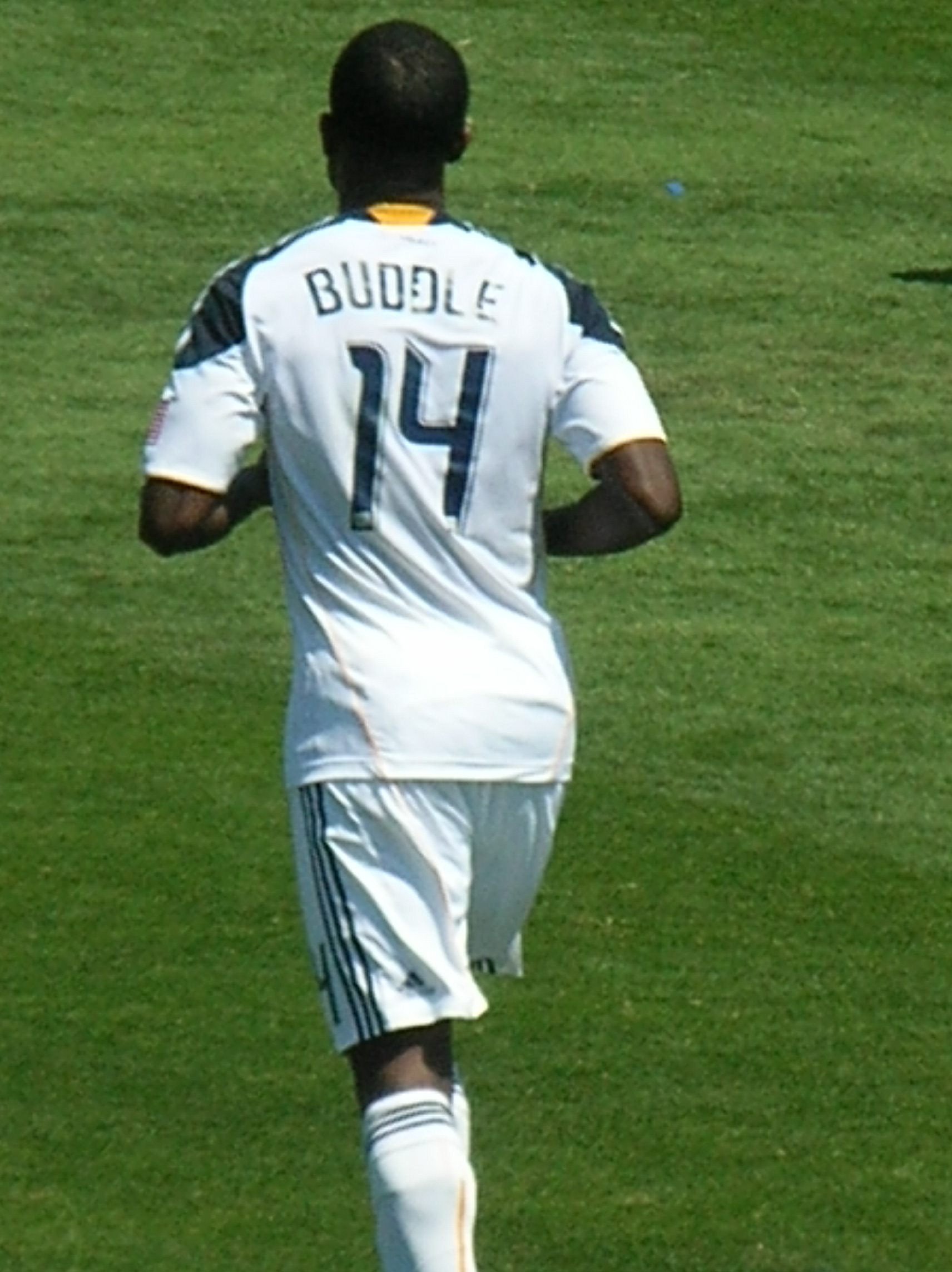
The Columbus Crew selected Edson Buddle 27th overall. He was named to the 2010 MLS Best XI and is a member of the MLS 100 Goal Club. He earned 11 caps with the US Men's National Team and was selected to the 2010 FIFA World Cup squad.

Pick #	MLS team	Player	Position	Affiliation
25	Dallas Burn (Note: #25: San Jose Earthquakes → Kansas City Wizards → Dallas Burn. 5 December 2000: Dallas Burn acquired this third-round selection from Kansas City Wizards in exchange for midfielder Mark Santel. On 3 May 2000, Kansas City had acquired this pick from San Jose Earthquakes in exchange for forward Harut Karapetyan.)	Josue Mayard	M	Montreal Impact (A-League)
26	MetroStars (Note: #26: D.C. United → MetroStars. 4 February 2001: MetroStars acquired this third-round selection, midfielder Richie Williams, and an allocation from D.C. United in exchange for a second-round pick (#15) in the 2001 SuperDraft and goalkeeper Mike Ammann.)	Kerwyn Jemmott	M	Joe Public F.C.
27	Columbus Crew	Edson Buddle*^†	F	Long Island Rough Riders (A-League)
28	D.C. United (Note: #28: Miami Fusion → D.C. United. 5 February 2001: D.C. United acquired this third-round pick from Miami Fusion in exchange for midfielder Antonio Otero and future considerations.)	Craig Ziadie	D	University of Richmond
29	Chicago Fire (Note: #29: Colorado Rapids → Chicago Fire. 10 April 2000: Chicago Fire acquired this third-round selection from Colorado Rapids in exchange for forward Junior Agogo.)	Jim Curtin^	D	Villanova University
30	Columbus Crew (Note: #30: New England Revolution → Columbus Crew. 14 March 2000: Columbus Crew acquired this third-round selection and future considerations from New England Revolution in exchange for goalkeeper Juergen Sommer.)	Kevin Adams	D	Joe Public F.C.
31	San Jose Earthquakes (Note: #31: Dallas Burn → San Jose Earthquakes. 7 June 2000: San Jose Earthquakes acquired this third-round selection from Dallas Burn in exchange for forward Esmundo Rodriguez.)	Craig Waibel	D	Seattle Sounders (A-League)
32	Colorado Rapids (Note: #32: Tampa Bay Mutiny → Colorado Rapids. 19 April 2000: Colorado Rapids acquired this third-round pick and a second-round pick in the 2002 MLS SuperDraft from Tampa Bay Mutiny in exchange for midfielder Kevin Anderson.)	Ryan Lee	D	UCLA
33	Chicago Fire (Note: '#33: Pick originally belonged to Los Angeles Galaxy. → Chicago Fire.)	Henry Ring^	GK	University of South Carolina
34	Tampa Bay Mutiny (Note: #34: Pick originally belonged to MetroStars. → San Jose Earthquakes → Tampa Bay Mutiny. 5 February 2001: Tampa Bay Mutiny acquired this third-round pick and a second-round selection (#14) in the 2001 SuperDraft from San Jose Earthquakes in exchange for midfielder Manny Lagos. More information needed.)	Alberto Munoz	M	Miami Breakers (PDL)
35	Kansas City Wizards (Note: #35: Chicago Fire → Kansas City Wizards. 3 March 2000: Kansas City Wizards acquired this third-round pick and a fifth-round selection in the 2001 SuperDraft from Chicago Fire in exchange for goalkeeper Chris Snitko.)	Ben Stafford	F	Wake Forest University
36	Colorado Rapids (Note: #36: Kansas City Wizards → D.C. United → Colorado Rapids. 5 February 2001: Colorado Rapids acquired this third-round selection and defender Geoff Aunger from D.C. United in exchange for a second-round selection (#18) in the 2001 SuperDraft. Earlier the same day, D.C. had acquired this pick from Kansas City Wizards in exchange for forward A.J. Wood.)	Eric Lukin	F	University of Illinois at Chicago

== Round 4 ==
Pick #	MLS team	Player	Position	Affiliation
37	San Jose Earthquakes	Fabio Eidelwein	F	Des Moines Menace (PDL)
38	Miami Fusion (Note: #38: D.C. United → Miami Fusion. 6 February 2000: Miami Fusion acquired this fourth-round selection and midfielder Keith Beach from D.C. United in exchange for a fourth-round pick in the 2000 MLS SuperDraft.)	Greg Simmonds	F	Hershey Wildcats (A-League)
39	Columbus Crew	McKinley Tennyson	F	UCLA
40	Miami Fusion	Cory Gibbs^	D	Brown University
41	Colorado Rapids	Ryan Trout	M	University of Virginia
42	New England Revolution	Yari Allnutt	M	Rochester Rhinos (A-League)
43	Dallas Burn	Adam Zapala	GK	Stanford University
44	Tampa Bay Mutiny	Adam Throop	GK	Chicago Sockers (PDL)
45	Los Angeles Galaxy	Brent Rahim	M	University of Connecticut
46	MetroStars	Martin Klinger*	F	MetroStars Black
47	New England Revolution (Note: #47: Chicago Fire → New England Revolution. 14 April 2000: New England Revolution acquired this fourth-round selection from Chicago Fire in exchange for midfielder Mike Sorber.)	Fernando Ortiz Solis	D	Tahuichi Academy
48	Kansas City Wizards	Pablo Webster	M	Clemson University

== Round 5 ==
Pick #	MLS team	Player	Position	Affiliation
49	San Jose Earthquakes	Corey Woolfolk	F	Stanford University
50	D.C. United	Caleb Norkus	F	University of North Carolina
51	Columbus Crew	Scott Powers	M	Brown University
52	Miami Fusion	Teófilo Cubillas, Jr.	M	Nova Southeastern University
53	New England Revolution (Note: #53: Colorado Rapids → New England Revolution. 16 March 2000: New England Revolution acquired this fifth-round selection from Colorado Rapids in exchange for midfielder Paul Dougherty.)	Eric Pogue	GK	Mid-Michigan Bucks (PDL)
54	New England Revolution	Shaun Tsakiris	M	UCLA
55	Dallas Burn	Gary DePalma	M	Pittsburgh Riverhounds (A-League)
56	Tampa Bay Mutiny	Mersim Beskovic	D	Westchester Flames (PDL)
57	Los Angeles Galaxy	Alex Bengard	M	CSU Dominguez-Hills
58	MetroStars	O'neil Peart	F	Long Island Rough Riders (A-League)
59	Kansas City Wizards (Note: #59: Chicago Fire → Kansas City Wizards. 3 March 2000: Kansas City Wizards acquired this fifth-round pick and a third-round selection in the 2001 SuperDraft from Chicago Fire in exchange for goalkeeper Chris Snitko.)	Narciso Fernandes	M	University of Wisconsin–Madison
60	Tampa Bay Mutiny (Note: #60: Kansas City Wizards → Tampa Bay Mutiny. 5 February 2001: Tampa Bay Mutiny acquired this fifth-round selection from Kansas City Wizards in exchange for a fifth-round pick in the 2002 MLS SuperDraft.)	Hector Navarte	M	Westchester Flames (PDL)

== Round 6 ==
Pick #	MLS team	Player	Position	Affiliation
61	San Jose Earthquakes	Jorge Martinez	M	San Jose State University
62	D.C. United	T.J. Hannig	GK	Indiana University
63	Columbus Crew	Phil Karn	F	Pittsburgh Riverhounds (A-League)
64	Miami Fusion	Daouda Kante	D	Florida International University
65	Colorado Rapids	John Carroll	M	Florida International University
66	New England Revolution	Michael Feller	D	University of Virginia
67	Dallas Burn	Miguel Saavedra*	M	Nike Project-40
68	Chicago Fire (Note: #68: Tampa Bay Mutiny → Chicago Fire. 6 February 2000: Chicago Fire acquired this sixth-round selection from Tampa Bay Mutiny in exchange for two sixth-round selections in the 2000 MLS SuperDraft.)	Danny Risch	F	Central Coast Roadrunners (PDL)
69	Los Angeles Galaxy	Mike Potempa	D	Clemson University
70	MetroStars	Russell Payne	GK	Boston Bulldogs (A-League)
71	Dallas Burn (Note: #71: Chicago Fire → Dallas Burn. Date Needed: Dallas Burn acquired this sixth-round pick from Chicago Fire in exchange for a sixth-round selection in the 2002 MLS SuperDraft.)	Roberto Navarro	M	University of Alabama at Birmingham
72	Kansas City Wizards	Matthew Cross	GK	Brown University

== Unresolved 2001 SuperDraft Trades ==
- 18 February 1999: Chicago Fire traded Zak Ibsen to Los Angeles Galaxy for 2001 second-round pick
- 24 February 1999, Colorado acquired GK Ian Feuer from New England Revolution in exchange for future considerations . It is unclear whether this trade was fulfilled through a 2001 first-round pick (#6), a 2001 second-round pick (#18), or why New England gave up draft picks to unload a player.
- 2 August 1999, Tampa Bay Mutiny traded defender Sam George, midfielder Paul Dougherty, and a conditional draft choice to Chicago Fire in exchange for defender Richie Kotschau and midfielder Manny Lagos. The draft pick may be 2001 pick #20.
