= Richard Cullen =

Richard Cullen may refer to:

- Richard Cullen (artist) (born 1970), British animator, designer and director, married to Darren Hayes, previously of Savage Garden
- Richard Cullen (attorney) (born 1948), former Attorney General of Virginia and U.S. attorney for the Eastern District of Virginia
- Richard Nigel Cullen (1917–1941), Australian fighter ace of World War II
- Rich Cullen (born 1975), American soccer goalkeeper
