= Juan Ramos =

Juan Ramos may refer to:

- Juan Ramos (soccer) (born 1971), retired American soccer defender
- Juan Antonio Ramos (born 1976), Spanish taekwondo practitioner
- Juan Soberanes Ramos (born 1968), Mexican professional boxer
- Juan Manuel Ramos (born 1996), Uruguayan footballer

== See also ==
- Juan Ramis (1746–1819), Menorcan lawyer, writer and historian
