= 2000 MLS SuperDraft =

College draft for soccer teams

General information
- Sport: Soccer
- Date: February 6, 2000
- Location: Fort Lauderdale, Florida

Overview
- 72 total selections
- First selection: Steve Shak, MetroStars

The 2000 Major League Soccer SuperDraft was held on February 6, 2000 in Fort Lauderdale, Florida, and consisted of six rounds.

One of the most successful draft picks was goalkeeper Nick Rimando, a third round pick, who went on to hold the record for most MLS career shutouts. Additionally, first round pick defender Carlos Bocanegra earned over 100 caps with the United States men's national soccer team.

== Player selection ==
Key

*	Denotes a player contracted under the Project-40 program
§	Denotes a player who won the MLS Rookie of the Year
^	Denotes player who has been selected to an MLS All-Star Game
†	Denotes player who has been selected for an MLS Best XI team
~	Denotes a player who won the MLS MVP

== Round 1 ==
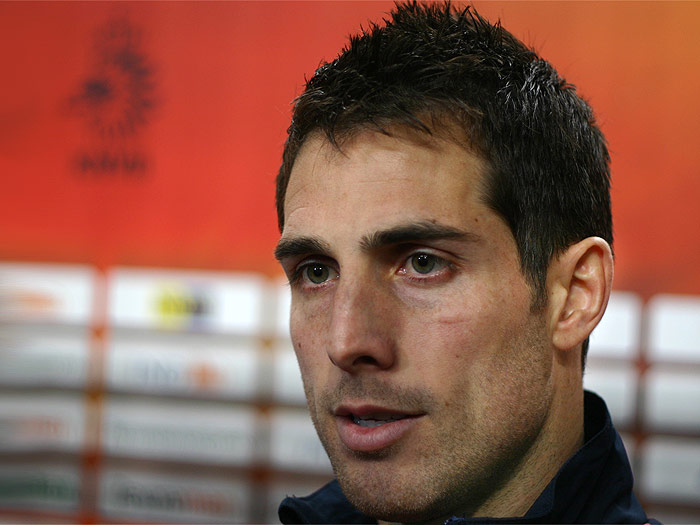
The Chicago Fire selected Carlos Bocanegra 4th overall. He is a 2x MLS Defender of the Year, 2x MLS Best XI selection and was named the 2000 MLS Rookie of the Year. He earned 110 caps with the US Men's National Team, being selected to the 2006, and 2010 FIFA World Cup squads.

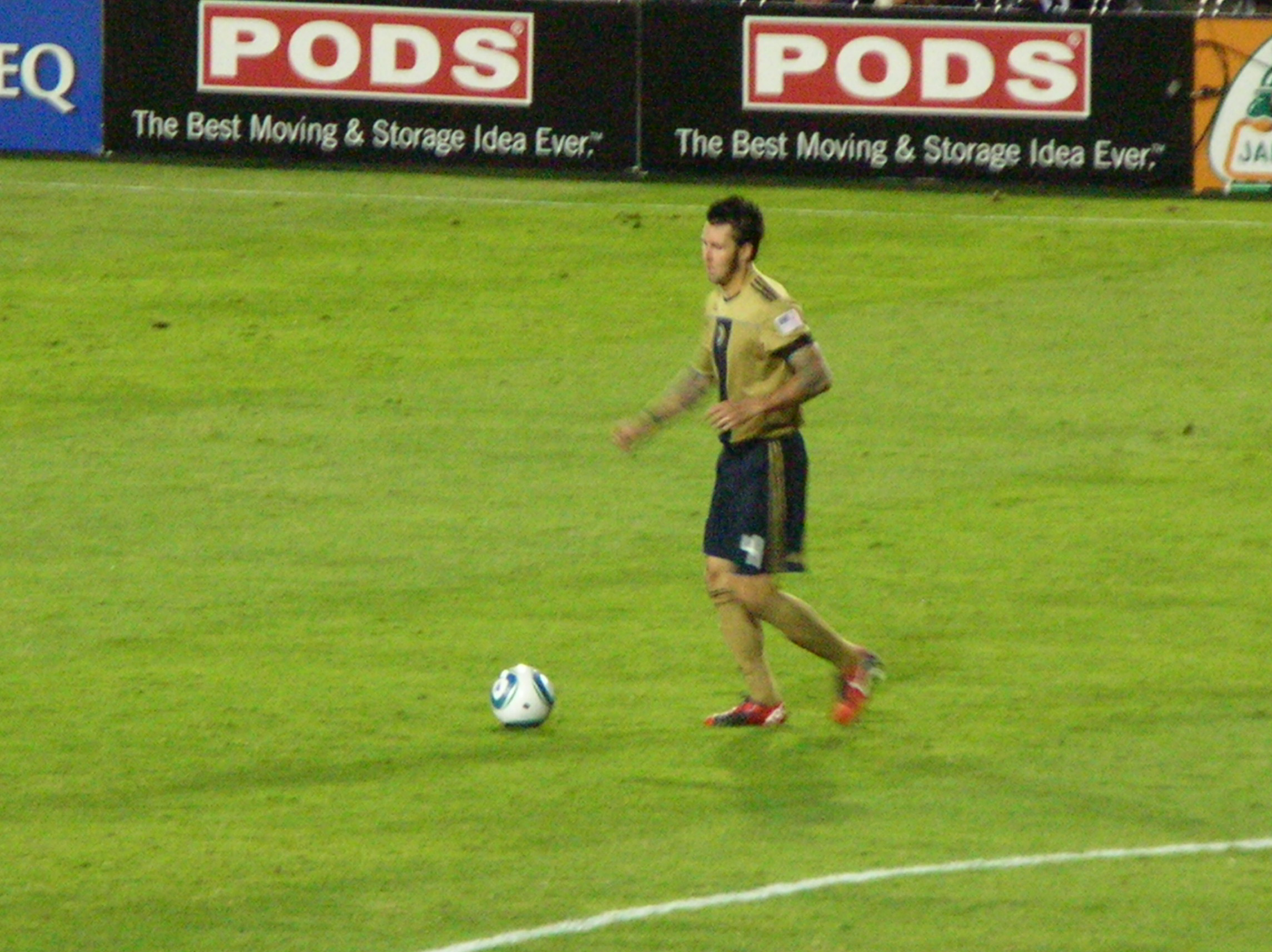
The LA Galaxy selected Danny Califf 6th overall. Califf is 2005 MLS Best XI selection. He earned 26 caps for the US Men's National Team and was selected for the 2003 and 2009 FIFA Confederations Cup squads.

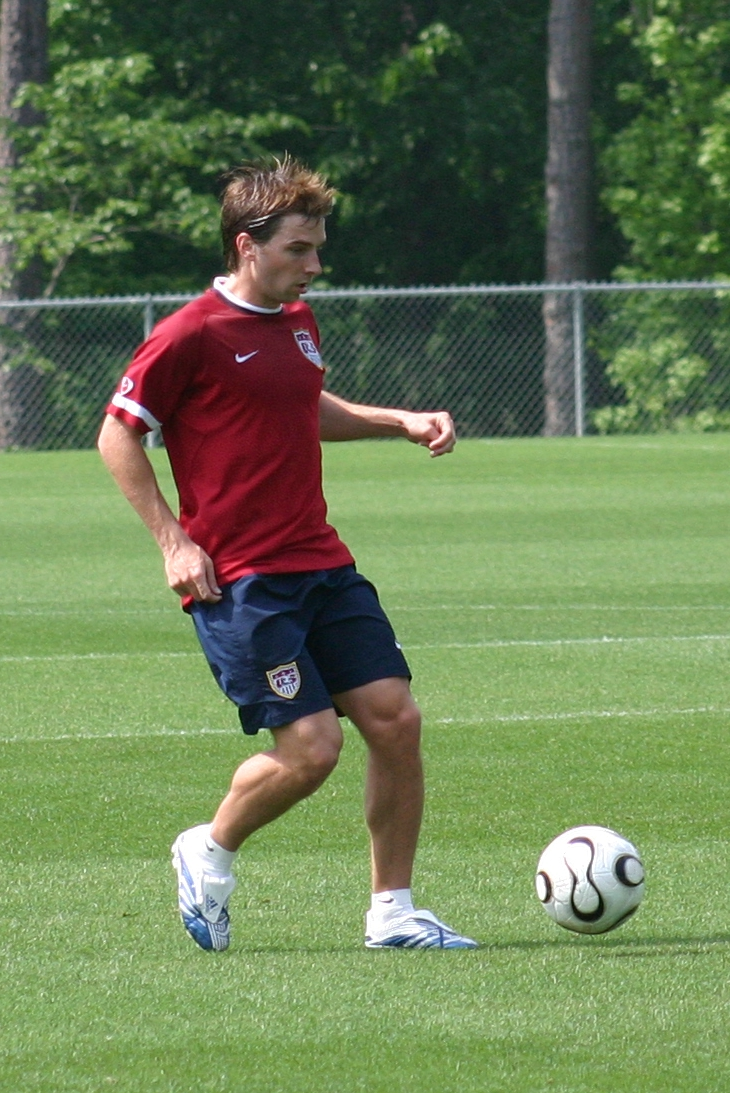
D.C. United selected Bobby Convey 12th overall. Convey earned 46 caps with the US Men's National Team and was selected to the 2006 FIFA World Cup squad.

Pick #	MLS team	Player	Position	Affiliation
1	MetroStars	Steve Shak	D	UCLA
2	Kansas City Wizards	Nick Garcia*	D	Indiana University
3	Colorado Rapids (Note: #3: New England Revolution → D.C. United → Miami Fusion → Columbus Crew → Dallas Burn → Colorado Rapids. 6 February 2000: Colorado Rapids acquired this first-round pick from Dallas Burn in exchange for the #5 pick in the 2000 SuperDraft and a first-round selection in the 2001 MLS SuperDraft. Earlier the same day, Dallas had acquired this first-round pick from Columbus Crew in exchange for forward Dante Washington. 3 January 2000: Columbus had acquired this first-round pick from Miami Fusion in exchange for midfielder Andy Williams. 17 July 1999: Miami had acquired this first-round pick, defender Brian Kamler, and forward Roy Lassiter (originally "future considerations" from D.C. United in exchange for forward Chris Albright and midfielder John Maessner. 2 February 1999: D.C. had acquired this first-round pick and a second-round pick in the 2000 SuperDraft from New England Revolution in exchange for midfielder John Harkes.)	Adin Brown	GK	College of William & Mary
4	Chicago Fire (Note: #4: San Jose Earthquakes → Chicago Fire. 29 June 1999: Chicago Fire acquired this first-round selection and a sixth-round selection in the 2000 SuperDraft, originally a third-round selection in the canceled 2000 MLS Supplemental Draft, from San Jose Earthquakes in exchange for the #8 selection in the 2000 Superdraft and midfielder Ryan Tinsley.)	Carlos Bocanegra*§^†	D	UCLA
5	Dallas Burn (Note: #5: Miami Fusion → D.C. United → Colorado Rapids → Dallas Burn. 6 February 2000: Dallas Burn acquired this first-round pick and a first-round selection in the 2001 MLS SuperDraft from Colorado Rapids in exchange for the #3 pick in the 2000 SuperDraft. 7 February 1999: Colorado had acquired this first-round pick from D.C. United in exchange for midfielder Antonio Otero. 5 December 1998: D.C. had acquired this first-round pick and a second-round selection in the 1999 MLS College Draft from Miami Fusion in exchange for midfielder Mario Gori and a second-round pick in the 1999 MLS College Draft.)	Aleksey Korol	F	Indiana University
6	Los Angeles Galaxy (Note: #6: Tampa Bay Mutiny → Chicago Fire → Los Angeles Galaxy. 6 February 2000: Los Angeles Galaxy acquired this first-round pick and a first-round selection in the 2001 MLS SuperDraft from Chicago Fire in exchange for midfielder DaMarcus Beasley. On 6 May 1999, Chicago had acquired this first-round pick from Tampa Bay Mutiny in exchange for midfielder Josh Keller.)	Danny Califf*†	D	University of Maryland
7	Colorado Rapids	Wes Hart	M	University of Washington
8	San Jose Earthquakes (Note: #8: Chicago Fire → San Jose Earthquakes. 29 June 1999: San Jose Earthquakes acquired this first-round selection and midfielder Ryan Tinsley from Chicago Fire in exchange for the #4 selection in the 2000 Superdraft and a sixth-round selection in the 2000 SuperDraft, originally a third-round selection in the canceled 2000 MLS Supplemental Draft.)	Travis Mulraine	M	Joe Public F.C.
9	Kansas City Wizards (Note: #9: Columbus Crew → Miami Fusion → Kansas City Wizards. 7 February 1999: Kansas City Wizards acquired this first-round pick and a first-round pick (#5) in the 1999 MLS College Draft from Miami Fusion in exchange for a first-round selection (#2) in the 1999 MLS College Draft. Earlier the same day, Miami had acquired this pick from Columbus Crew in exchange for a second-round pick (#18) in the 1999 MLS College Draft and defender Matt Kmosko.)	John Wilson	M	Charleston Battery (A-League)
10	Colorado Rapids (Note: #10: Dallas Burn → New England Revolution → Colorado Rapids. 6 February 2000: Colorado Rapids acquired this first-round pick and a third-round selection (#26) in the 2000 SuperDraft from New England Revolution in exchange for a third-round selection (#31) in the 2000 SuperDraft and forward Wolde Harris. On 13 August 1999, New England had acquired this first-round pick, originally "future considerations", and midfielder Leonel Álvarez from Dallas Burn in exchange for forward Ariel Graziani.)	Alan Woods	D	Clemson University
11	Los Angeles Galaxy	Sasha Victorine	M	UCLA
12	D.C. United	Bobby Convey*	M	Project-40

== Round 2 ==
Pick #	MLS team	Player	Position	Affiliation
13	D.C. United (Note: #13: MetroStars → New England Revolution → D.C. United. 2 February 1999: D.C. United acquired this second-round pick and a first-round pick in the 2000 SuperDraft from New England Revolution in exchange for midfielder John Harkes. On 20 January 1999, New England had acquired this second-round pick and forward Giovanni Savarese from MetroStars in exchange for forward Raúl Díaz Arce.)	Stephen Armstrong	M	Butler University
14	New England Revolution (Note: #14: Kansas City Wizards → New England Revolution. 2 January 2000: New England Revolution acquired this second-round pick and third-round and fourth-round picks in the 2000 SuperDraft from Kansas City Wizards in exchange for a third-round selection in the 2000 SuperDraft and midfielder Jeff Baicher.)	Rusty Pierce*	D	UNC-Greensboro
15	Kansas City Wizards (Note: #15: Pick originally belonged to New England Revolution. → Colorado Rapids → Kansas City Wizards. 3 February 2000: Kansas City Wizards acquired this second-round selection, defender Peter Vermes, and midfielder Matt McKeon from Colorado Rapids in exchange for a second-round pick (#20) in the 2000 SuperDraft, an international allocation, and defender Scott Vermillion. More information needed.)	Peter Byaruhanga	F	University of Alabama at Birmingham
16	San Jose Earthquakes	Justin Evans	M	Pittsburgh Riverhounds (A-League)
17	Miami Fusion	Martín Machón	M	Santos (Mexico)
18	San Jose Earthquakes (Note: #18: Tampa Bay Mutiny → San Jose Earthquakes. 27 January 1999: San Jose Earthquakes acquired this second-round selection from Tampa Bay Mutiny in exchange for goalkeeper Andy Kirk.)	Joseph Ragusa	D	Long Island Rough Riders (A-League)
19	D.C. United (Note: #19: Colorado Rapids → San Jose Earthquakes → D.C. United. 6 February 2000: D.C. United acquired this second-round selection from San Jose Earthquakes in exchange for a second-round pick (#24) in the 2000 SuperDraft and a second-round selection in the 2001 MLS SuperDraft. On 2 February 2000, San Jose had acquired this second-round pick from Colorado Rapids in exchange for goalkeeper David Kramer.)	Eric Denton	D	Santa Clara University
20	Colorado Rapids (Note: #20: Pick originally belonged to Chicago Fire. → Kansas City Wizards → Colorado Rapids.3 February 2000: Colorado Rapids acquired this second-round selection, an international allocation, and defender Scott Vermillion from Kansas Cit Wizards in exchange for a second-round pick (#15) in the 2000 SuperDraft, defender Peter Vermes, and midfielder Matt McKeon. More information needed.)	Keyeno Thomas	M	Joe Public F.C.
21	Columbus Crew	Roland Aguilera	M	Tahuichi Academy
22	Dallas Burn	Antonio Martínez	M	Cal State-Fullerton
23	Los Angeles Galaxy	Peter Vagenas	M	UCLA
24	San Jose Earthquakes (Note: #24: D.C. United → San Jose Earthquakes. 6 February 2000: San Jose Earthquakes acquired this second-round pick and a second-round selection in the 2001 MLS SuperDraft from D.C. United in exchange for a second-round pick (#19) in the 2000 SuperDraft.)	Adrian Narine	F	Joe Public F.C.

== Round 3 ==
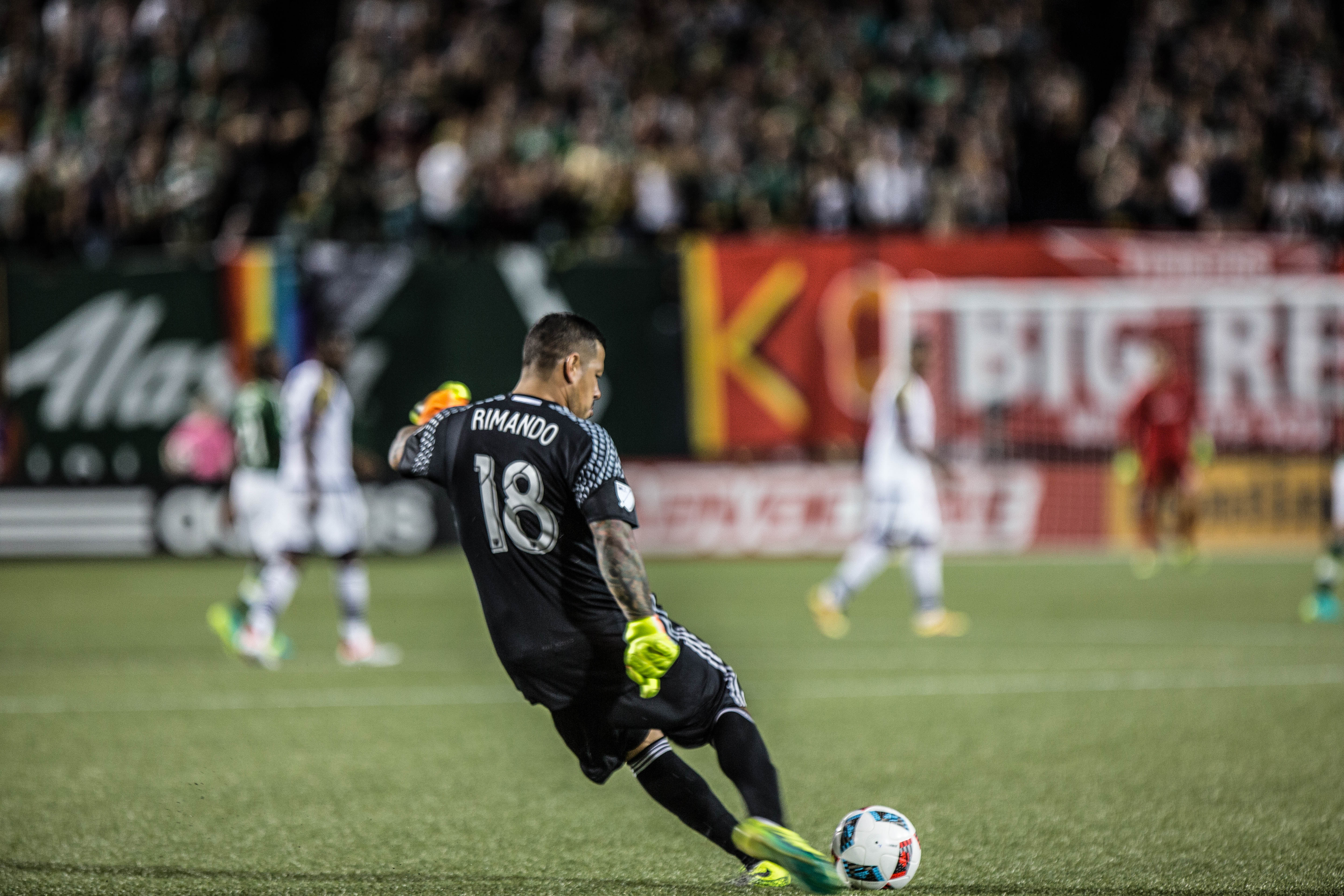
The Miami Fusion selected Nick Rimando 35th overall. He holds the Major League Soccer records for career wins, shutouts, saves, minutes played and overall appearances. He earned 22 caps with the US Men's National Team and was selected to the 2014 FIFA World Cup squad.

Pick #	MLS team	Player	Position	Affiliation
25	Miami Fusion (Note: '#25: Pick originally belonged to MetroStars. → Miami Fusion.)	David Wright	D	Creighton University
26	Colorado Rapids (Note: #26: Kansas City Wizards → New England Revolution → Colorado Rapids. 6 February 2000: Colorado Rapids acquired this third-round pick and a first-round selection (#10) in the 2000 SuperDraft from New England Revolution in exchange for a third-round selection (#31) in the 2000 SuperDraft and forward Wolde Harris. On 2 January 2000, New England had acquired this third-round pick and second-round and fourth-round picks in the 2000 SuperDraft from Kansas City Wizards in exchange for a third-round selection in the 2000 SuperDraft and midfielder Jeff Baicher.)	Jeff DiMaria	F	Saint Louis University
27	D.C. United (Note: '#27: Pick originally belonged to New England Revolution. → D.C. United.)	Sergio Salas*	F	Project-40
28	San Jose Earthquakes	Jon Conway	GK	Rutgers University
29	Los Angeles Galaxy (Note: #29: Miami Fusion → Los Angeles Galaxy. 6 February 2000: Los Angeles Galaxy acquired this third-round pick from Miami Fusion in exchange for a third-round pick (#35) in the 2000 SuperDraft and a second-round selection in the 2001 MLS SuperDraft from Los Angeles Galaxy .)	José Retiz	M	Rancho Santiago – Santa Ana
30	Kansas City Wizards (Note: #30: Pick originally belonged to Tampa Bay Mutiny. New England Revolution → Kansas City Wizards. 2 January 2000: Kansas City Wizards acquired this third-round selection in the 2000 SuperDraft and midfielder Jeff Baicher from New England Revolution in exchange for second-round, third-round, and fourth-round picks in the 2000 SuperDraft. More information needed.)	Kerry Zavagnin†	D	Lehigh Valley Steam (A-League)
31	New England Revolution (Note: #31: Colorado Rapids → New England Revolution. 6 February 2000: New England Revolution acquired this third-round selection and forward Wolde Harris from Colorado Rapids in exchange for a first-round selection (#10) and a third-round selection (#26) in the 2000 SuperDraft.)	Shaker Asad*	M	North Carolina State University
32	Chicago Fire	Yuri Lavrinenko	M	Indiana University
33	Columbus Crew	Brian Winters	M	University of Portland
34	Dallas Burn	Steve Bernal	D	Creighton University
35	Miami Fusion (Note: #35: Los Angeles Galaxy → Miami Fusion. 6 February 2000: Miami Fusion acquired this third-round pick and a second-round selection in the 2001 MLS SuperDraft from Los Angeles Galaxy in exchange for a third-round pick (#29) in the 2000 SuperDraft.)	Nick Rimando*^	GK	UCLA
36	New England Revolution (Note: '#36: Pick originally belonged to D.C. United. → New England Revolution.)	Fabio Zúñiga	F	Raritan Valley Community College

== Round 4 ==
Pick #	MLS team	Player	Position	Affiliation
37	MetroStars	Daniel Alvarez	M	Furman University
38	New England Revolution (Note: #38: Kansas City Wizards → New England Revolution. 2 January 2000: New England Revolution acquired this fourth-round pick and second-round and third-round picks in the 2000 SuperDraft from Kansas City Wizards in exchange for a third-round selection in the 2000 SuperDraft and midfielder Jeff Baicher.)	Adam Eyre	D	Santa Clara University
39	New England Revolution	Bo Oshoniyi	GK	Atlanta Silverbacks (A-League)
40	San Jose Earthquakes	Andrew Hemmerich	D	Stanford University
41	D.C. United (Note: #41: Miami Fusion → D.C. United. 6 February 2000: D.C. United acquired this fourth-round selection from Miami Fusion in exchange for a fourth-round selection in the 2001 MLS SuperDraft and midfielder Keith Beach.)	Michael Burke	F	Charleston Battery (A-League)
42	Tampa Bay Mutiny	Amos Magee	F	Minnesota Thunder (A-League)
43	Colorado Rapids	Lance Key	D	Trinity University
44	Chicago Fire	John Wolyniec	F	Long Island Rough Riders (A-League)
45	Columbus Crew	Christof Lindenmayer	F	Loyola College in Maryland
46	Dallas Burn	Brian Piesner	M	Rutgers University
47	Los Angeles Galaxy	Josh Henderson	F	Lehigh Valley Steam (A-League)
48	MetroStars (Note: '#48: Pick originally belonged to D.C. United. → MetroStars.)	Orlando Perez	M	Orange County Zodiac (A-League)

== Round 5 ==
Pick #	MLS team	Player	Position	Affiliation
49	MetroStars	Colby Jackson	F	Cal State-Fullerton
50	Kansas City Wizards	Tom Zawislan	GK	Creighton University
51	Tampa Bay Mutiny (Note: #51: New England Revolution → Tampa Bay Mutiny. 7 February 1999: Tampa Bay Mutiny acquired this fifth-round pick, originally a second-round selection in the canceled 2000 MLS Supplemental Draft, from New England Revolution in exchange for a second-round selection in the 1999 MLS College Draft.)	Mark Schulte	D	Twin Cities Tornado (PDL)
52	San Jose Earthquakes	Ian Russell	F	Seattle Sounders (A-League)
53	Miami Fusion	Pablo Gentile	D	Miami Breakers (PDL)
54	Tampa Bay Mutiny	Brian Waltrip	F	University of South Florida
55	Colorado Rapids	Peter Scavo	F	Seton Hall University
56	Chicago Fire	Alejandro Rincon	M	Southern Connecticut State
57	Columbus Crew	Dominic Schell	D	University of Mobile
58	Dallas Burn	Seth Marks	D	Furman University
59	Los Angeles Galaxy	Thomas Serna	F	Rancho Santiago (Mexico)
60	D.C. United	Micah Cooks*	M	Project-40

== Round 6 ==
Pick #	MLS team	Player	Position	Affiliation
61	MetroStars	Jake Dancy	D	Kansas City Wizards
62	Kansas City Wizards	Casey Sweeney	D	Indiana Blast (A-League)
63	New England Revolution	Tom Hardy	D	Vancouver 86ers (A-League)
64	Tampa Bay Mutiny (Note: #64: San Jose Earthquakes → Chicago Fire → Tampa Bay Mutiny. 6 February 2000: Tampa Bay Mutiny acquired this sixth-round selection and another sixth-round selection (#65) from Chicago Fire in exchange for a sixth-round selection in the 2001 MLS SuperDraft. On 29 June 1999, Chicago Fire acquired this sixth-round selection, originally a third-round selection in the canceled 2000 MLS Supplemental Draft, and a first-round selection in the 2000 SuperDraft from San Jose Earthquakes in exchange for midfielder Ryan Tinsley.)	Ubusuku Abukusumo	D	Columbus Crew
65	Tampa Bay Mutiny (Note: #65: Miami Fusion → Chicago Fire → Tampa Bay Mutiny. 6 February 2000: Tampa Bay Mutiny acquired this sixth-round selection and another sixth-round selection (#64) from Chicago Fire in exchange for a sixth-round selection in the 2001 MLS SuperDraft. On 19 February 1999, Chicago had acquired this sixth-round pick, originally a third-round selection in the canceled 2000 MLS Supplemental Draft, from Miami Fusion in exchange for defender Tomasz Wygonik.)	Ernest Inneh	F	Staten Island Vipers (A-League)
66	Tampa Bay Mutiny	Mike Gentile	M	Minnesota Thunder (A-League)
67	Colorado Rapids	Rich Cullen	GK	Air Force Academy
68	Chicago Fire	Kevin Jackson	M	Lehigh University
69	Columbus Crew	PASS		
70	Dallas Burn	Angel Rivillo	M	Creighton University
71	Los Angeles Galaxy	Ali John Utush	F	San Francisco Bay Seals (A-League)
72	D.C. United	PASS		

== Unresolved 2000 SuperDraft Trades ==
- 21 January 1999: MetroStars traded F Raúl Díaz Arce and MF Marcelo Vega to San Jose for a player to be named and future considerations.
- 29 March 1997: Kansas City Wizards acquired D John Diffley from the Tampa Bay Mutiny for a conditional third-round draft pick in 1999 or 2000.
- 28 January 1999: D.C. United traded second round and third round picks in 2000 college draft to New York/New Jersey MetroStars for Diego Sonora.
- 28 January 1999: San Jose sent third-rounder to MetroStars in Diego Sonora three-way deal.
- 7 February 1999: New England Revolution acquired two second round selections in the 2000 MLS College Draft from the New York/New Jersey MetroStars in exchange for a second round selection in the 1999 MLS College Draft.
- 7 February 1999: MetroStars acquired D.C.'s first-round 1999 supplemental draft pick for its 2000 first-round supplemental draft pick (4th round SuperDraft).
- 5 May 1999: Chicago acquired Ryan Tinsley via trade with Kansas City Wizards in exchange for Jesse Van Saun and Fire's No. 1 selection in the 2000 MLS Supplemental Draft (4th round SuperDraft). -Chi2011
- 5 June 1999: Miami Fusion acquired a 2000 second-round pick and forward Tony Kuhn from New England Revolution in exchange for midfielder Carlos Parra.
