= Gabe Eastman =

American soccer player (born 1977)

Personal information
- Full name: Gabe Eastman
- Date of birth: March 7, 1977 (age 49)
- Place of birth: Modesto, California, United States
- Height: 6 ft 2 in (1.88 m)
- Position: Defender

Youth career
- 1993–1996: MJC Pirates

Senior career*
| Years | Team | Apps | (Gls) |
| 1997 | Stanislaus County Cruisers | | (0) |
| 1998 | Nashville Metros | 28 | (0) |
| 1999 | Los Angeles Galaxy | 1 | (0) |
| 1999 | → Orange County Zodiac (loan) | 2 | (0) |
| 1999 | → MLS Pro 40 (loan) | 6 | (0) |
| 2000 | San Jose Earthquakes | 2 | (0) |
| 2000–2001 | Stanislaus United Cruisers | 30 | (3) |
| 2002 | Charleston Battery | 1 | (0) |
| 2002 | Hampton Roads Mariners | 4 | (0) |
- * Club domestic league appearances and goals

Gabe Eastman (born March 7, 1977) is an American former soccer player who played as a defender.

== Career ==
=== College ===
Eastman attended Modesto Junior College, where he was voted his college soccer team's MVP in 1995.

=== Professional ===
Eastman began his professional career with his hometown team, the Stanislaus County Cruisers in the USISL D3-Pro League in 1997, and was voted Rookie of the Year in his debut season. He moved to play for Nashville Metros in 1998 and was equally successful, being voted to the All A-League First Team. Eastman was drafted with the first pick of the 1999 MLS Supplemental Draft by Los Angeles Galaxy, but only made one single MLS appearance for them, as a substitute for Robin Fraser, three minutes before the end of a game against Colorado Rapids on March 20, 1999. The Galaxy sent him on loan to both MLS Pro 40 and to the Orange County Zodiac. He was waived by the Galaxy at the end of the 1999 season, and was picked up by the San Jose Earthquakes in the 1999 Waiver Draft. Again, Eastman never managed to hold down a regular spot with the team, and made just two league appearances for the Earthquakes, he requested his released half way through the 2000 campaign, and it was granted in June 2000.

He rejoined his first team, Stanislaus United Cruisers, and played against San Jose in a US Open Cup game in late 2000 recording 1 assist. After spending two more years in the lower leagues, including a short sting with Charleston Battery in the A-League, he retired from competitive soccer in the mid-2000s.
