= David Wright (American soccer) =

American soccer player

Personal information
- Date of birth: April 8, 1978 (age 48)
- Place of birth: Louisville, Kentucky, United States
- Height: 6 ft 4 in (1.93 m)
- Position: Defender

Youth career
- 1996–1999: Creighton Bluejays

Senior career*
Years	Team	Apps	(Gls)
1999	Jackson Chargers		
2000–2003	Pittsburgh Riverhounds	78	(4)
2004	Rochester Rhinos	27	(2)
- * Club domestic league appearances and goals

David Wright is a retired American soccer defender who played professionally in the USL A-League.

Wright graduated from Ballard High School. During his prep soccer career, Wright was a two-time high school state champion and the Kentucky High School Player of the Year. Wright attended Creighton University, where he was a 1999 NCAA First Team All American. Wright also played for the Jackson Chargers of the USL Premier Development League during the college off-season. In February 2000, the Miami Fusion selected Wright in the third round (twenty-fifth overall) of the 2000 MLS SuperDraft. Wright was the last player released during the pre-season. However, the Pittsburgh Riverhounds had also drafted Wright in the second round (45th overall) of the 2000 A-League Draft. After leaving the Fusion, Wright signed with the Riverhounds, playing for them until 2003. In 2002, Wright injured his knee in the pre-season and saw time in only nine games during the second half of the season. In January 2004, Wright joined the Rochester Rhinos.
