= Ryan Turner =

American soccer player

Personal information
- Date of birth: May 14, 1976 (age 50)
- Place of birth: Chandler, Arizona, United States
- Height: 6 ft 1 in (1.85 m)
- Position: Midfielder

Youth career
- 1994, 1996–1997: Notre Dame Fighting Irish

Senior career*
Years	Team	Apps	(Gls)
1999	Charleston Battery	15	(1)
1999	Myrtle Beach Seadawgs	3	(0)
- * Club domestic league appearances and goals

Ryan Turner is a retired American soccer midfielder who played professionally in the USL A-League.

Turner played for the Santos Soccer Club in Arizona which went to the finals of the McGuire Cup (U-19 U.S. Youth National Championship). Turner attended the University of Notre Dame. He played three years for the Fighting Irish, scoring twenty-one goals in sixty-two games. He was a 1998 Academic All American and graduated with a Bachelor of Business Administration in Finance. In February 1999, the Kansas City Wizards selected him in the second round (fourteenth overall) of the 1999 MLS Supplemental Draft. The Wizard released him during the preseason and Turner signed with the Charleston Battery of the USL A-League. The Battery released him during the season and he finished the year with the Myrtle Beach Seadawgs. Turner retired at the end of the season and joined Morgan Stanley Smith Barney.
