= Tomasz Wygonik =

Polish footballer

Personal information
- Date of birth: 8 May 1968 (age 58)
- Place of birth: Jasło, Poland
- Height: 1.89 m (6 ft 2 in)
- Position: Defender

Senior career*
Years	Team	Apps	(Gls)
1988–1989	Wisła Kraków	2	(0)
1997–1998	Central Jersey Riptide		
1999	Miami Fusion	0	(0)
1999–2000	Hampton Roads Mariners	19	(0)
2002–2004	Jersey Falcons	20	(4)
- * Club domestic league appearances and goals

Tomasz Wygonik (born 8 May 1968) is a Polish former professional footballer who played as a defender.

Wygonik played two games for Wisła Kraków during the 1988–89 season. In 1997 and 1998, Wygonik played for the Central Jersey Riptide of the USISL D-3 Pro League. On 7 February 1999, the Chicago Fire selected Wygonik in the first round (twelfth overall) of the 1999 MLS Supplemental Draft. Twelve days later, the Fire traded him to the Miami Fusion for the Fire's third round pick in the 2000 MLS SuperDraft. The Fusion waived Wygonik on 2 April 1999. He then signed with the Hampton Roads Mariners of the USL A-League where he played two seasons. The Mariners released him in August 2000. He then played for the Jersey Falcons of the USL PDL from 2002 to 2004. Wygonik continued to play for the amateur Garfield Vistula during the late 2000s.
