= Alejandro Sequeira =

Costa Rican football striker (born 1975)

Personal information
- Full name: Giovanni Alejandro Sequeira Solano
- Date of birth: 27 April 1975 (age 51)
- Place of birth: San Jose, Costa Rica
- Height: 1.80 m (5 ft 11 in)
- Position: Striker

Senior career*
Years	Team	Apps	(Gls)
1995–1997	Saprissa		
1997–1999	Cobán Imperial		
1999	Tampa Bay Mutiny	11	(2)
1999	San Jose Clash	14	(3)
2000	Proodeftiki	11	(0)
2000–2001	Saprissa		
2002–2003	Cobán Imperial		
2003–2004	Santa Bárbara		
2004	Saprissa	17	(2)
2005	Águila		
2005–2006	Cartaginés	5	(0)
2006–2007	Carmelita	30	(12)
2007–2008	Brujas	20	(3)
2008–2009	Ramonense	48	(21)
2010–2011	Saprissa	41	(21)
2011	Orión Desamparados	0	(0)

International career^{‡}
1999–2009	Costa Rica	2	(0)
- * Club domestic league appearances and goals as of 21:39, 12 December 2011 (UTC) ‡ National team caps and goals as of 21:39, 6 June 2010 (UTC)

Giovanni Alejandro Sequeira Solano (born 27 April 1975) is a Costa Rican retired international footballer who played as a striker.

== Club career ==
Sequeira began his professional career in 1995 with Saprissa, and has played in Costa Rica for Santa Bárbara, Cartaginés, Brujas and Carmelita, in Guatemala for Cobán Imperial, in the United States for the Tampa Bay Mutiny and the San Jose Clash, in Greece for Proodeftiki and in El Salvador for Águila.

He returned to Saprissa in January 2010 and joined Orión Desamparados in May 2011 to finish his career there in July 2011.

With Saprissa, he became the league's goalscorer of the 2010 Verano season. He had already scored his 100th Costa Rica Primera División goal a year before, when with Ramonense and ended up with 130 goals.

== International career ==
Sequeira made his senior debut for Costa Rica in a January 1999 friendly match against Ecuador and earned his second and final cap 10 years later with a September 2009 FIFA World Cup qualification match against El Salvador.

== Personal life ==
Sequeira is married to Mileska Marín and they have two sons, Alejandro and Sebastián. In 2006, he overcame alcoholism after his wife threatened to divorce him.

His brother Douglas Sequeira also played for the national team.
