= Juan Ramos (soccer) =

American soccer player

John Ramos
Personal information
- Full name: Juan Ramos
- Height: 5 ft 10 in (1.78 m)
- Position: Defender

Youth career
- 1991–1994: Nova Southeastern University

Senior career*
Years	Team	Apps	(Gls)
1996–1997	Spandauer BC		
- Spandauer SV
1997	Florida Strikers		
1998	Jacksonville Cyclones	23	(0)
1999	Boston Bulldogs	2	(0)
- Raleigh Capital Express
2006	Miami FC	8	(0)
- * Club domestic league appearances and goals

Juan "John" or "Johnny" Ramos is an American retired soccer defender who played professionally in Germany and the United States.

Ramos graduated from J. P. Taravella High School. He attended Nova Southeastern University, playing on the men's soccer team in 1992 and 1993. He graduated with a bachelor's degree in psychology.

In 1996, Ramos signed with Spandauer BC. He also played for Spandauer SV. In 1997, he returned to the United States where he played for the Florida Strikers of the USISL D-3 Pro League. In 1998, he played for the Jacksonville Cyclones. In February 1999, the Miami Fusion selected Ramos in the second round (seventeenth overall) of the 1999 MLS Supplemental Draft. The Fusion waived him on February 26, 1999. He then played two games for the Boston Bulldogs in 1999. Ramos played for Raleigh Capital Express. In February 2006, he was signed by Miami FC of the USL First Division after attending an open tryout.

Ramos has coached extensively including Cypress Bay High School, American Heritage School and Plantation FC.

In 2016, Ramos was arrested on charges that he sexually abused a former player starting when she was 13 years old. In 2022, he was sentenced to 15 years in prison.
