= Fabio Zúñiga (footballer, born 1979) =

Colombian footballer

Personal information
- Date of birth: 24 November 1979 (age 46)
- Position: Defender

Senior career*
| Years | Team | Apps | (Gls) |
| 2001–2002 | Dragón | | |
| 2004 | Cortuluá | 14 | (1) |
| 2005–2008 | Deportes Quindío | 10 | (0) |
- * Club domestic league appearances and goals as of 18:44, 9 January 2019 (UTC)

Fabio Zúñiga (born 28 November 1979) is a former Colombian footballer who played as a defender.

== Career ==
Zúñiga played in the 2004 Categoría Primera A for Cortuluá, before leaving for Deportes Quindío. He left Deportes Quindío in 2008.

== Career statistics ==
=== Club ===
| Club | Season | League | | | Cup | | Other | | Total | |
| Club | Season | Division | Apps | Goals | Apps | Goals | Apps | Goals | Apps | Goals |
|---|---|---|---|---|---|---|---|---|---|---|
| Cortuluá | 2004 | Categoría Primera A | 14 | 1 | 0 | 0 | 0 | 0 | 14 | 0 |
| Career total | | | 14 | 0 | 0 | 0 | 0 | 0 | 14 | 0 |
