= Eric Lukin =

American soccer player

Personal information
- Date of birth: June 14, 1979 (age 47)
- Place of birth: United States
- Height: 1.81 m (5 ft 11 in)
- Positions: Defender; midfielder; forward

College career
Years	Team	Apps	(Gls)
1997–2000	UIC Flames	82	(50)

Senior career*
Years	Team	Apps	(Gls)
2002	Pomorac	2	(0)
2002–2004	Sportfreunde Siegen	40	(0)
2003–2004	→ Sportfreunde Siegen II (loan)	13	(0)
2004–2005	TuS Koblenz	11	(0)
2005–2006	1. FC Saarbrücken II		
- * Club domestic league appearances and goals

Eric Lukin (born June 14, 1979) is an American former soccer player who played as a defender, midfielder, or forward.

== Career ==
Lukin is the all-time top scorer of the University of Illinois at Chicago.

In 2002, he signed for German third division side Sportfreunde Siegen from Pomorac in Croatia.
