= Anthony Farace =

American soccer player (born 1976)

Personal information
- Date of birth: May 10, 1976 (age 50)
- Place of birth: San Diego, California, United States
- Height: 6 ft 0 in (1.83 m)
- Positions: Forward; midfielder

Senior career*
| Years | Team | Apps | (Gls) |
| 1996 | Anaheim Splash (indoor) | 14 | (0) |
| 1998–1999 | San Diego Flash | 23 | (1) |
| 2000 | Orange County Waves | 10 | (0) |
| 2000 | San Diego Flash | 12 | (0) |
| 2001–2004 | San Diego Sockers (indoor) | 48 | (17) |
- * Club domestic league appearances and goals

Anthony Farace is a retired U.S. soccer player who spent his career with Southern California based teams in the Major Indoor Soccer League and USL A-League.

Farace attended Patrick Henry High School in San Diego.

Farace may have begun his professional career in 1996 with the Anaheim Splash of the Continental Indoor Soccer League, but records do not currently show how long he was with the team. In 1998, he signed with the San Diego Flash of the USL A-League. However, he lost the entire season with a knee injury. The San Jose Clash selected Farace in the third round (twenty-seventh overall) of the 1999 MLS Supplemental Draft. The Clash waived him on April 1, 1999. He returned to the Flash and played 23 games during the 1999 season. On November 10, 1999, the Flash sent Farace, Michael N’Doumbe, and the team's first and second-round draft picks to the Seattle Sounders in exchange for Mark Baena. On April 12, 2000, the Sounders sent Farace to the Orange County Waves for cash after he refused to play for the Sounders. He began the season with the Wave, but was traded to the Flash during the season. In 2001, he signed with the San Diego Sockers of the World Indoor Soccer League. The WISL played a summer indoor season, but folded at the end of the season. In the fall of 2002, the Sockers moved to the new Major Indoor Soccer League. The Monterrey Fury selected Farace in the eighth round of the 2003 MISL Expansion Draft. On July 29, 2003, he returned to the Sockers when the team sent a second round draft pick to the Fury in exchange for Farace. In January 2004, he was forced to sit out the remainder of the season following reconstructive surgery on his left knee. In September, he re-injured the knee and retired. Despite this, the Milwaukee Wave still selected Farace in the January 2005 MISL Dispersal Draft, but he did not sign with the team.

He coaches the Science Hill High School girls soccer team.
