= Martin Klinger =

Ecuadorian footballer (born 1980)

Personal information
- Date of birth: 9 July 1980 (age 46)
- Place of birth: Cuenca, Ecuador
- Height: 5 ft 11 in (1.80 m)
- Position: Defender

Senior career*
Years	Team	Apps	(Gls)
2001–2002	MetroStars	9	(0)
- * Club domestic league appearances and goals

Martin Klinger (born 9 July 1980) is an Ecuadorian retired footballer who played as a defender.

== Early and personal life ==
He was born in Cuenca. His older brother Fausto Klinger was also a footballer.

== Career ==
He spent two seasons in Major League Soccer with the MetroStars.
