= Tom Hardy (soccer) =

American soccer player

Personal information
- Place of birth: United States
- Position: Defender

Youth career
- 1994–1997: Seattle University

Senior career*
Years	Team	Apps	(Gls)
1998–1999	Vancouver 86ers		
- * Club domestic league appearances and goals

Tom Hardy is an American retired soccer defender who played professionally in the USL A-League. He was the 1998 NAIA Player of the Year.

Hardy graduated from Roosevelt High School. He attended Seattle University, where he was a 1997 Third Team and 1998 First Team NAIA All American as well as the 1998 NAIA Player of the Year. In 1997, Hardy and his teammates won the NAIA national men's soccer championship.

On February 2, 1998, the Kansas City Wizards selected Hardy in the second round (twentieth overall) of the 1998 MLS Supplemental Draft, but was released during the pre-season. In August 1998, Hardy signed with the Vancouver 86ers of the USL A-League and played two seasons with them. In 1999, he nineteen games for Vancouver. In February 2000, the New England Revolution selected Hardy in the sixth round of the 2000 MLS SuperDraft.
