= Rich Cullen =

American soccer player and coach

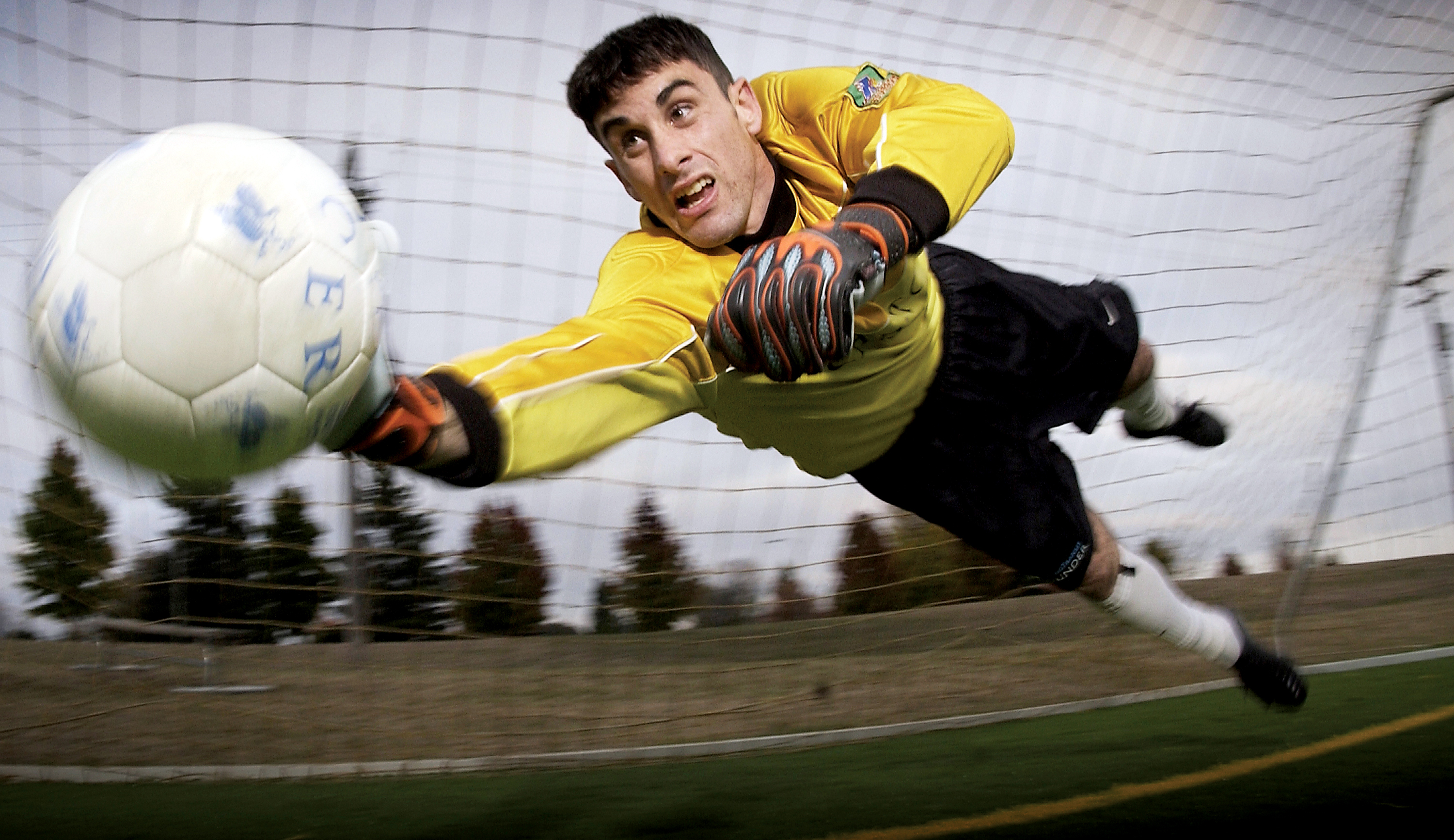
- Cullen in 2003

Personal information
- Full name: Richard Patrick Cullen
- Date of birth: January 12, 1975 (age 51)
- Place of birth: Spokane, Washington, United States
- Height: 6 ft 0 in (1.83 m)
- Position: Goalkeeper

Youth career
- 1996–1999: Air Force Falcons

Senior career*
Years	Team	Apps	(Gls)
2000	Colorado Rapids	0	(0)
2000	→ Colorado Springs Ascent (loan)		
2001–2003	Seattle Sounders	25	(0)

Managerial career
- 2000, 2003–2005: Air Force Falcons (assistant)
- * Club domestic league appearances and goals

Richard Patrick Cullen is an American retired soccer goalkeeper.

== Life ==
In 1996, Cullen, the son of an Air Force pilot, graduated from Mead Senior High School. He attended the United States Air Force Academy, playing on the men's soccer team from 1996 to 1999. He holds the Falcons' records for career saves and career shutouts. On February 6, 2000, the Colorado Rapids selected Cullen in the sixth round (67th overall) of the 2000 MLS SuperDraft. He remained at the academy as an assistant coach while playing backup with the Rapids and on loan to the Colorado Springs Ascent. In 2001, Cullen joined the Seattle Sounders of the USL A-League. He spent most of the 2001 and 2002 seasons as backup before claiming a starting spot in 2003 when Preston Burpo broke his jaw in an on-field collision with Danny Jackson. Cullen backstopped the Sounders to the A-League semifinals and was named Second Team All League. However, the Sounders released him at the end of the season. During his years with the Sounders, Cullen was stationed at McChord Air Force Base as an Air Force Reservist. In 2004, the Air Force transferred Cullen back to the academy where he spent two seasons as an assistant with the Falcons' soccer team.
