= Ryan Tinsley =

American soccer player

Personal information
- Date of birth: October 1, 1971 (age 55)
- Place of birth: New York City, United States
- Height: 5 ft 9 in (1.75 m)
- Position: Midfielder

College career
Years	Team	Apps	(Gls)
1990	Irvine Valley Lasers		
1991	UC Irvine Anteaters		
1992–1993	Fresno State Bulldogs		

Senior career*
Years	Team	Apps	(Gls)
1994	Orange County Precise		
1994	San Diego Sockers (indoor)	19	(9)
1995	Newport Beach Riptide		
1995–1996	Saarbrücken		
1996	San Diego Sockers (indoor)	23	(26)
1997–1999	Kansas City Wizards	61	(3)
1999	Chicago Fire	3	(0)
1999–2000	San Jose Earthquakes	35	(1)
- * Club domestic league appearances and goals

Ryan Tinsley (born October 1, 1971) is an American retired soccer midfielder who played professionally in the Continental Indoor Soccer League and Major League Soccer.

== Youth ==
Tinsley graduated from El Toro High School in 1989. He began his college career at Irvine Valley College where he was a 1990 All-Orange Empire Conference player. In July 1991, he transferred to UC Irvine where he played one season. In 1992, he transferred to Fresno State where he finished his college soccer career.

== Professional ==
In 1994, Tinsley played for the amateur Orange County Precise in the Pacific Soccer League. On July 24, 1994, he signed with the San Diego Sockers of the Continental Indoor Soccer League. In 1995, he played for the amateur Newport Beach Riptide of the Pacific Soccer League, winning the league title in April. In June 1995, the Sockers transferred Tinsley to FC Saarbrücken He spent the 1995–1996 season in Germany. On July 12, 1996, the Sockers selected Tinsley with the first pick in the 1996 CISL Supplemental Draft. On February 2, 1997, the Kansas City Wizards selected Tinsley in the first round (seventh overall) of the 1997 MLS Supplemental Draft. He played two seasons in Kansas City where he was in the top four players both seasons as far as games and minutes played. He injured his knee during the 1999 pre-season and did not play a game before the Wizards traded him to the Chicago Fire in exchange for Jesse Van Saun and a first-round pick in the 2000 MLS SuperDraft. He played three games for the Fire, then was traded to the San Jose Clash on June 30, 1999, in exchange for the fourth selection in the 2000 MLS SuperDraft, which Chicago used to draft future U.S. national team captain Carlos Bocanegra. He finished the 1999 season in San Jose, then became a regular during the 2000 season before retiring in October 2000.
