= Adam Eyre =

American soccer player

Personal information
- Date of birth: January 7, 1978 (age 48)
- Place of birth: California, U.S.
- Height: 6 ft 1 in (1.85 m)
- Position: Defender

College career
Years	Team	Apps	(Gls)
1996–1999	Santa Clara		

Senior career*
Years	Team	Apps	(Gls)
2000	New England Revolution	10	(0)
2000	→ MLS Pro-40 (loan)	9	(0)
2000–2001	Connecticut Wolves	22	(0)
2002–2003	Minnesota Thunder	55	(2)
Total		96	(2)
- * Club domestic league appearances and goals

Adam Eyre (born January 7, 1978) is an American former soccer player who played for New England Revolution in Major League Soccer.

== Personal life ==
In December 2006, he married Aly Wagner. Wagner gave birth to triplet boys in August 2013 and a daughter in December 2015.

== Career statistics ==
=== Club ===
Club	Season	League			Cup		Other		Total	
Club	Season	Division	Apps	Goals	Apps	Goals	Apps	Goals	Apps	Goals
New England Revolution	2000	MLS	10	0	1 (Note: Appearances in the U.S. Open Cup)	0	0	0	11	0
MLS Pro-40 (loan)	2000	USL A-League	9	0	0	0	0	0	9	0
Connecticut Wolves	2000	USL A-League	1	0	0	0	0	0	1	0
Connecticut Wolves	2001	USL A-League	21	0	0	0	0	0	21	0
Connecticut Wolves	Total		22	0	0	0	0	0	22	0
Minnesota Thunder	2002	USL A-League	28	0	0	0	0	0	28	0
Minnesota Thunder	2003	USL A-League	27	2	0	0	0	0	27	2
Minnesota Thunder	Total		55	2	0	0	0	0	55	2
Career total			96	2	1	0	0	0	97	2
