= Fabio Zúñiga (soccer) =

American soccer player

Personal information
- Date of birth: June 11, 1981 (age 45)
- Place of birth: Summit, New Jersey, United States
- Height: 5 ft 7 in (1.70 m)
- Position: Forward

Senior career*
Years	Team	Apps	(Gls)
2000	New England Revolution	1	(0)
2000	→ MLS Pro-40 (loan)	12	(1)
2001	Connecticut Wolves	25	(3)
Total		38	(4)
- * Club domestic league appearances and goals

Fabio Zúñiga (born June 11, 1981) is a former American soccer player who played for New England Revolution in the MLS.

== Career statistics ==
=== Club ===
Club	Season	League			Cup		Other		Total	
Club	Season	Division	Apps	Goals	Apps	Goals	Apps	Goals	Apps	Goals
New England Revolution	2000	MLS	1	0	1 (Note: Appearances in the U.S. Open Cup)	0	0	0	2	0
MLS Pro-40 (loan)	2000	USL A-League	12	1	0	0	0	0	12	1
Connecticut Wolves	2001	USL A-League	25	3	0	0	0	0	25	3
Career total			38	4	1	0	0	0	39	4
