= 2004 USL A-League =

USL A-League
- Season: 2004
- Teams: 16
- Champions: Montreal Impact (2nd Title)
- Premiers: Portland Timbers (1st Title)
- Matches: 224
- Goals: 592 (2.64 per match)
- Best Player: (Canada) Greg Sutton, Montreal Impact
- Top goalscorer: (United States) Dante Washington, Virginia Beach Mariners, (United States) Alan Gordon, Portland Timbers (17 goals)
- Best goalkeeper: (Canada) Greg Sutton, Montreal Impact

The 2004 USL A-League was an American Division II league run by the United Soccer League during the summer of 2004.

== Standings ==
=== Western Conference ===
Conference Semifinal round of playoffs

Pos	Team	Pld	W	L	D	GF	GA	GD	Pts
1	Portland Timbers	28	18	7	3	58	30	+28	57
2	Vancouver Whitecaps	28	14	9	5	38	29	+9	47
3	Minnesota Thunder	28	13	9	6	33	23	+10	45
4	Seattle Sounders	28	13	11	4	40	34	+6	43
5	Milwaukee Wave United	28	12	12	4	44	48	−4	40
6	Calgary Mustangs	28	4	18	6	30	51	−21	18
7	Edmonton F.C.	28	4	18	6	19	56	−37	18

=== Eastern Conference ===
Conference Semifinal round of playoffs

Pos	Team	Pld	W	L	D	GF	GA	GD	Pts
1	Montreal Impact (C)	28	17	6	5	36	15	+21	56
2	Richmond Kickers	28	17	8	3	44	29	+15	54
3	Syracuse Salty Dogs	28	15	8	5	40	29	+11	50
4	Rochester Raging Rhinos	28	15	10	3	36	32	+4	48
5	Atlanta Silverbacks	28	14	11	3	41	48	−7	45
6	Virginia Beach Mariners	28	11	14	3	43	41	+2	36
7	Toronto Lynx	28	10	16	2	38	50	−12	32
8	Charleston Battery	28	7	15	6	30	39	−9	27
9	Puerto Rico Islanders	28	5	17	6	22	48	−26	21

(C) Champions

== Playoffs ==
Conference Semifinals
1	Montreal Impact	1	1	2
8	Rochester Raging Rhinos	0	0	0
4	Syracuse Salty Dogs (aet) (p)	1	1	2 (5)
5	Richmond Kickers	0	2	2 (4)
2	Minnesota Thunder	0	0	0
7	Vancouver Whitecaps	2	1	3
3	Seattle Sounders (aet)	1	2	3
6	Portland Timbers	2	0	2

Conference Finals
Montreal Impact	2	1	3
Syracuse Salty Dogs	0	1	1
Vancouver Whitecaps	0	1	1
Seattle Sounders	1	1	2

Final
Montreal Impact	2
Seattle Sounders	0

== Eastern Conference ==
=== Richmond Kickers vs Syracuse Salty Dogs ===
September 3, 2004
7:00 PM (EST)

Richmond Kickers (VA)	0–1	Syracuse Salty Dogs (NY)
Tim Brown (yellow card) 76'; Mike Burke (yellow card) 78'	Report	(yellow card) 18' Temoc Suarez; (yellow card) 53' Rene Rivas; 63' Lars Lyssand; (yellow card) 81' Ian Woan

University of Richmond Stadium, Richmond, Virginia
Attendance: 2,776
Referee: Abbas Piran

September 5, 2004
5:00 PM (EST)

Syracuse Salty Dogs (NY)	1–2 (a.e.t.)	Richmond Kickers (VA)
Ian Woan 41'; Rene Rivas (yellow card) 43'; Jonny Steele (yellow card) 60'	Report	6' Tim Brown; (yellow card) 35' Richie Williams; (yellow card) 77' Peter Luzak; 90' Kevin Knight
Penalties
Scott Schweitzer (penalty missed); David Lara (penalty scored); Ian Woan (penalty scored); Timothy O'Neill (penalty scored); Mauro Carabajal (penalty scored); Byron Foss (penalty scored)	5–4	(penalty scored) Robert Ukrop; (penalty scored) Paul Lekics; (penalty scored) Dustin Swinehart; (penalty scored) Kevin Jeffrey; (penalty missed) David Hayes; (penalty missed) Chris Fox

SUNY Cortland Stadium, Cortland, New York
Attendance: 2,564
Referee: Ronnie Canales

The Syracuse Salty Dogs advance, 5–4, on penalty kicks after the series ended tied 2–2 on aggregate.

=== Rochester Rhinos vs Montreal Impact ===
September 3, 2004
7:35 PM (EST)

Rochester Rhinos (NY)	0–1	Montreal Impact (QC)
Shaun Tsakiris (yellow card) 56'; Chris Carrieri (yellow card) 80'	Report	53' Eduardo Sebrango

Frontier Field, Rochester, New York
Attendance: 7,124
Referee: Roni Canales, United States

September 5, 2004
7:00 PM (EST)

Montreal Impact (QC)	1–0	Rochester Rhinos (NY)
Eduardo Sebrango 32', (yellow card) 32'; Mauro Biello (yellow card) 71'	Report	(yellow card) 34' (yellow-red card) 74' Kirk Wilson; (yellow card) 51' David Wright; (yellow card) 72' Ian Fuller; (yellow card) 80' Jefferson Dargout

Complexe sportif Claude-Robillard, Montreal, Quebec
Attendance: 10,201
Referee: Silviu Petrescu, Canada

The Montreal Impact advance 2–0 on aggregate.

== Western Conference semifinals ==
=== Portland Timbers vs Seattle Sounders ===
September 1, 2004
7:05 (PST)

Portland Timbers (OR)	2–1	Seattle Sounders (WA)
Brian Winters (yellow card) 47'; Byron Alvarez 52'; Andrew Gregor 81' (pen.)	Report	17' Roger Levesque; (yellow card) 28' Jonathan Bolaños; (yellow card) 38' Billy Sleeth; (yellow card) 45' Preston Burpo; (red card) 79' Marco Vélez; (yellow card) 87' Zach Scott

PGE Park, Portland, Oregon
Attendance: 4,863
Referee: Nathan Lacy

September 5, 2004

Seattle Sounders (WA)	2–0 (OT)	Portland Timbers (OR)
Welton Melo 5' 100'; Billy Sleeth (yellow card) 20'; Ryan Edwards (yellow card) 69'; Zach Scott (yellow card) 82'	Report	(yellow card) 59' Byron Alvarez

Qwest Field, Seattle, Washington
Attendance: 3,490
Referee: Jair Marrufo

The Seattle Sounders advance 3–2 on aggregate.

=== Vancouver Whitecaps vs Minnesota Thunder ===
September 3, 2004
10:00 PM (EST)

Vancouver Whitecaps (BC)	2–0	Minnesota Thunder (MN)
Carlo Corazzin 6', (red card) 90'; Davide Xausa 47'; Steve Kindel (red card) 58'	Report	(red card) 90' Godfrey Tenoff

Swangard Stadium, Burnaby, British Columbia
Attendance: 4,135
Referee: Dave Gantar, Canada

September 5, 2004
7:00 PM (EST)

Minnesota Thunder (MN)	0–1	Vancouver Whitecaps (BC)
Freddy Juarez (yellow card) 18'; David Castellanos (yellow card) 33'; Dustin Branan (yellow card) 53'	Report	(yellow card) 66' Ive Sulentic; 75' David Morris

James Griffin Stadium, St. Paul, Minnesota
Attendance: 589
Referee: Brian D'Amato, United States

The Vancouver Whitecaps advance 3–0 on aggregate.

== Eastern Conference final ==
September 10, 2004
7:30 PM (EST)

Syracuse Salty Dogs (NY)	0–2	Montreal Impact (QC)
Temoc Suarez (yellow card) 26' (yellow-red card) 49'; René Rivas (yellow card) 79' (yellow-red card) 90'	Report	(yellow card) 43' Ze Roberto; (yellow card) 50' Joel Bailey; 70' Frederick Commodore; 73' Mauro Biello

P&C Stadium, Syracuse, New York
Attendance: 6,345
Referee: Andrew Chapin, United States

September 12, 2004
4:00 PM (EST)

Montreal Impact (QC)	1–1	Syracuse Salty Dogs (NY)
Patrick Leduc 20' (pen.); António Ribeiro (yellow card) 85'	Report	(yellow card) 32' Lars Lyssand; (yellow card) 16', (goal) 39' Kupono Low; (yellow card) 22' Frank Sanfilippo

Complexe sportif Claude-Robillard, Montreal, Quebec
Attendance: 8,539
Referee: Jose Farias, Canada

The Montreal Impact advanced 3–1 on aggregate.

== Western Conference finals ==
September 10, 2004
11:00 PM (EST)

Seattle Sounders (WA)	1–0	Vancouver Whitecaps (BC)
Jonathan Bolaños 57', (yellow card) 57'; Chad Brown (yellow card) 90'	Report	(yellow card) 32' Geordie Lyall; (yellow card) 41' Justin Thompson

Qwest Field, Seattle
Attendance: 2,496
Referee: Baldomero Toledo, United States

September 12, 2004
10:00 PM (EST)

Vancouver Whitecaps (BC)	1–1	Seattle Sounders (WA)
Jason Jordan 18'; Steve Kindel (yellow card) 58'	Report	(yellow card) 37' Roger Levesque; 44' Jason Farrell; (yellow card) 69' (yellow-red card) 72' Welton Melo; (yellow card) 86' Chad Brown

Swangard Stadium, Burnaby, British Columbia
Attendance: 5,286
Referee: Tiger Liu, Canada

The Seattle Sounders advance 2–1 on aggregate.

== Final ==
September 18, 2004
7:00 PM (EDT)

Montreal Impact (QC)	2–0	Seattle Sounders (WA)
Mauricio Vincello (yellow card) 12', (goal) 33'; Ze Roberto (yellow card) 14'; Nevio Pizzolito (yellow card) 61'; Frederick Commodore 78'	Report	(yellow card) 17' Darren Sawatzky; (yellow card) 43' Billy Sleeth

Complexe sportif Claude-Robillard, Montreal, Quebec
Attendance: 13,648
Referee: Mauricio Navarro (Canada)

MVP: Mauricio Vincello

USL A-League
2004 Champions
(Canada)
Montreal Impact
First title

== Points leaders ==
Rank	Scorer	Club	GP	Goals	Assists	Points
1	(United States) Dante Washington	Virginia Beach Mariners	27	17	6	40
2	(Mexico) Byron Alvarez	Portland Timber	25	16	4	36
3	(United States) Alan Gordon	Portland Timbers	27	17	1	35
4	(Canada) Ali Gerba	Toronto Lynx	25	15	4	34
5	(United States) Johnny Torres	Milwaukee Wave United	26	11	7	29
6	(United States) Mac Cozier	Atlanta Silverbacks	28	12	4	28
7	(United States) Greg Howes	Milwaukee Wave United	24	9	8	26
8	(United States) Todd Dusosky	Milwaukee Wave United	23	10	4	24
8	(Liberia) McColm Cephas	Richmond Kickers	26	10	4	24
8	(United States) Chris Carrieri	Rochester Rhinos	27	8	8	24
11	(Brazil) Mauricio Salles	Puerto Rico Islanders	25	11	1	23
12	(Canada) Jason Jordan	Vancouver Whitecaps	19	7	7	21
13	(Brazil) Welton Melo	Seattle Sounders	23	5	10	20
13	(Mexico) Hugo Alcaraz-Cuellar	Portland Timber	26	5	10	20
13	(England) Matthew Delicâte	Richmond Kickers	26	7	6	20

== Awards and All A-League Teams ==
All A-League First Team
F: (Mexico) Byron Alvarez (Portland Timbers); (United States) Alan Gordon (Portland Timbers) (Co-Leading Goalscorer); (United States) Dante Washington (Virginia Beach Mariners) (Co-Leading Goalscorer)
M: (Canada) Mauro Biello (Montreal Impact); (Canada) Sandro Grande (Montreal Impact); (Honduras) Alex Pineda Chacón (Atlanta Silverbacks); (United States) Johnny Torres (Milwaukee Wave United)
D: (Canada) Gabriel Gervais (Montreal Impact) (Defender of the Year); (United States) Dustin Branan (Minnesota Thunder); (United States) Peter Luzak (Richmond Kickers)
G: (Canada) Greg Sutton (Montreal Impact) (MVP & Goalkeeper of the Year)
Coach: (England) Bobby Howe, Portland Timbers) (Coach of the Year)

All A-League Second Team
F: (United States) Mac Cozier (Atlanta Silverbacks); (Canada) Ali Gerba (Toronto Lynx); (United States) Greg Howes (Milwaukee Wave United)
M: (Mexico) Hugo Alcaraz-Cuellar, Portland Timbers); (United States) Justin Evans (Charleston Battery); (Canada) Alfredo Valente (Vancouver Whitecaps); (United States) Richie Williams (Richmond Kickers)
D: (Trinidad and Tobago) Craig Demmin (Rochester Raging Rhinos); (Canada) Nevio Pizzolitto (Montreal Impact); (Canada) Mark Watson (Charleston Battery)
G: (United States) Joe Warren (Minnesota Thunder)
