= 2004 U.S. Open Cup =

2004 Lamar Hunt U.S. Open Cup
Tournament details
- Country: United States

Final positions
- Champions: Kansas City Wizards (1st title)
- Runners-up: Chicago Fire

Tournament statistics
- Top goal scorer(s): Julian Nash (4 goals)

The 2004 Lamar Hunt U.S. Open Cup ran from June through September, 2004, open to all soccer teams in the United States.

The Kansas City Wizards won the Open Cup tournament with a 1–0 golden-goal victory over the defending-champion Chicago Fire at Arrowhead Stadium in Kansas City, Missouri on September 22, 2004. Kansas City missed out on a domestic double when the Wizards lost to D.C. United for the MLS Cup 2004.

The Open Cup tournament was highlighted by A-League side Charleston Battery reaching the semifinals, one of four USL teams to beat Major League Soccer teams. The 2004 tournament was also the final edition contested using golden goal as opposed to more conventional soccer extra time.

== Open Cup Bracket ==
Home teams listed on top of bracket

Third Round
PDL	Carolina Dynamo	2
A-L	Atlanta Silverbacks (ASDET)	3
MLS	Dallas Burn	2
A-L	Virginia Beach Mariners	0
A-L	Minnesota Thunder (ASDET)	2
PDL	Rapids Reserve	1
PSL	Utah Blitzz	1
A-L	Portland Timbers	2
A-L	Richmond Kickers (ASDET)	1
PDL	Cape Cod Crusaders	0
MLS	Columbus Crew	2
A-L	Syracuse Salty Dogs	1
A-L	Rochester Rhinos	1
PDL	Fire Reserves	0
A-L	Charleston Battery	2
PSL	Wilmington Hammerheads	0

Fourth Round
A-L	Atlanta Silverbacks	1
MLS	Kansas City Wizards	4
MLS	Dallas Burn	3
MLS	Colorado Rapids	0
A-L	Minnesota Thunder	1
MLS	Los Angeles Galaxy	0
A-L	Portland Timbers	0
MLS	San Jose Earthquakes	3
A-L	Richmond Kickers	2
MLS	D.C. United	1
MLS	Columbus Crew	1
MLS	Chicago Fire (ASDET)	2
MLS	New England Revolution	1 (1)
A-L	Rochester Rhinos ASDET, PSO	1 (3)
A-L	Charleston Battery	1
MLS	MetroStars	0

Quarterfinals
MLS	Kansas City Wizards	4
MLS	Dallas Burn	0
A-L	Minnesota Thunder	2 (4)
MLS	San Jose Earthquakes (ASDET, PSO)	2 (5)
A-L	Richmond Kickers	0
MLS	Chicago Fire	1
A-L	Rochester Rhinos	0
A-L	Charleston Battery	1

Semifinals
MLS	Kansas City Wizards	1
MLS	San Jose Earthquakes	0
MLS	Chicago Fire (ASDET)	1
A-L	Charleston Battery	0

Finals
MLS	Kansas City Wizards (ASDET)	1
MLS	Chicago Fire	0

== Schedule ==
Note: Scorelines use the standard U.S. convention of placing the home team on the right-hand side of box scores.

=== First round ===
Eight PDL and eight USASA teams start.

June 2, 2004	(Massachusetts) Cape Cod Crusaders (PDL)	4–1	(New York (state)) Greek American AA (USASA)	Queens, New York
	Krause 14'; Palguta 60'; Bulow 70'; Caldwell 78'	(Report)	Grafas 25'	Stadium: St. John's University; Attendance: 100; Referee: Guido Gonzalez (USA)

June 2, 2004	(Maryland) Allied SC (USASA)	0–5	(New Jersey) South Jersey Barons (PDL)	Winslow Township, New Jersey
		(Report)	Mingo 2'; Maher 22'; Carmichael 24', 62'; Banks 60'	Stadium: Winslow Township High School; Attendance: 65; Referee: Hossam Saad (USA)

June 2, 2004	(Colorado) Boulder Rapids Reserve (PDL)	2–1	(California) Chico Rooks (USASA)	Chico, California
	Brown 71'; Branan 74'	(Report)	Wondolowski 69'	Stadium: Chico State University; Attendance: 1,000; Referee: Said Ravanfar (USA)

June 2, 2004	(Wisconsin) Bavarian SC (USASA)	1–5	(North Carolina) Carolina Dynamo (PDL)	Greensboro, North Carolina
	Hawley 26'	(Report)	Farrell 57', 64'; Storey 83'; Rhyne 90'; Lochrie 90+1'	Stadium: Macpherson Stadium; Attendance: 300; Referee: Richard Rodriguez (USA)

June 2, 2004	(Illinois) S.A.C. Wisla (USASA)	1–5	(Illinois) Chicago Fire Reserves (PDL)	Bensenville, Illinois
	Okarmus 68'	(Report)	Rolfe 45'; Nash 46', 85'; Knowles 48'; Klatter 78'	Stadium: Redmond Stadium; Attendance: 300; Referee: Pawel Wydra (USA)

June 2, 2004	(California) Sacramento Knights (USASA)	2–1	(Washington (state)) Spokane Shadow (PDL)	Spokane, Washington
	McDonald 60'; Field 90+1' (pen.)	(Report)	Ready 29'	Stadium: Joe Albi Stadium; Attendance: 1,000; Referee: David Simon (USA)

June 8, 2004	(Texas) Azzuri S.C. (USASA)	2–3	(Florida) Cocoa Expos (PDL)	Cocoa, Florida
	Kneipper 1'; Sastoque 72'	(Report)	Glasser 32'; Moojen 86', 90+3'	Stadium: Cocoa Expo Sports Center; Attendance: 27; Referee: Kermit Quisenberry (USA)

June 8, 2004	(Texas) Legends FC (USASA)	1–3	(Texas) DFW Tornados (PDL)	Bedford, Texas
	Whiteley 90'	(Report)	Rowland 52' de Souza 68'; Gorski 90' (pen.)	Stadium: Pennington Field; Attendance: -- Referee: Adam Garner (USA)

=== Second round ===
Six PSL and two A-League teams enter.

June 15, 2004	(Illinois) Chicago Fire Reserves (PDL)	5–1	New Hampshire Phantoms (PSL)	Manchester, New Hampshire
	Nash 27', 37'; Curran 54' (o.g.); Knowles 77'; Khumalo 80'	(Report)	Fleming 84'	Stadium: Southern New Hampshire University; Attendance: 315; Referee: Gus St. Silva (USA)

June 15, 2004	(North Carolina) Charlotte Eagles (PSL)	2–4	(North Carolina) Carolina Dynamo (PDL)	Greensboro, North Carolina
	Coggins 4', 11'	(Report)	Moose 13'; Merrit 32'; Rhyne 37'; Storey 57'	Stadium: Macpherson Stadium; Attendance: 150; Referee: Charles Mitchell (USA)

June 15, 2004	(Texas) DFW Tornados (PDL)	0–2	Virginia Beach Mariners (A-League)	Virginia Beach, Virginia
		(Report)	Jonas 48'; Washington 55'	Stadium: Virginia Beach Sportsplex; Attendance: 385; Referee: Ben Jones (USA)

June 15, 2004	(New York (state)) Syracuse Salty Dogs (A-League)	1–1 / ab	(New Jersey) South Jersey Barons (PDL)	Winslow Township, New Jersey
	Kerekes 22'	(Report)	Holloway 27'	Stadium: Winslow Township High School; Attendance: 110; Referee: Mike Constantine (USA)
Note: Match abandoned in the 75th minute due to lightning and darkness

June 21, 2004 replay	(New York (state)) Syracuse Salty Dogs (A-League)	4–2	(New Jersey) South Jersey Barons (PDL)	Winslow Township, New Jersey
	Rivas 31' (pen.); Mach 35', 67'; Millwood 53'	(Report)	Holloway 22'; Carmichael 90'	Stadium: Winslow Township High School; Attendance: 380; Referee: Ken Heller (USA)

June 15, 2004	(California) Sacramento Knights (USASA)	0–3	Utah Blitzz (PSL)	Salt Lake City, Utah
		(Report)	Breza 9'; McNicol 37'; Afrash 45'	Stadium: Rice-Eccles Stadium; Attendance: -- Referee: Carlos Palomino (USA)

June 15, 2004	(Massachusetts) Cape Cod Crusaders (PDL)	3–2	(Massachusetts) Western Mass Pioneers (PSL)	Ludlow, Massachusetts
	Collings 19'; Bulow 54' (pen.), 79'	(Report)	Jachym 8', 24'	Stadium: Lusitano Stadium; Attendance: 1,500; Referee: Claudiu Badea (USA)

June 15, 2004	(Florida) Cocoa Expos (PDL)	0–3	(North Carolina) Wilmington Hammerheads (PSL)	Wilmington, North Carolina
		(Report)	Ukah 5'; McNam 13'; Murray 43'	Stadium: Legion Stadium; Attendance: 1,211; Referee: Daniel Burack (USA)

June 15, 2004	(California) San Diego Gauchos (PSL)	0–0 (asdet) (4–5 pen)	(Colorado) Boulder Rapids Reserve (PDL)	Boulder, Colorado
		(Report)		Stadium: Pleasant View Field; Attendance: -- Referee: Jose Corre (USA)

=== Third round ===
Six A-League and two MLS teams enter.

June 30, 2004	(Massachusetts) Cape Cod Crusaders (PDL)	0–1 (asdet)	(Virginia) Richmond Kickers (A-League)	Richmond, Virginia
		(Report)	Hayes 94'	Stadium: Sports Backers Stadium; Attendance: 1,353; Referee: Andrew Chapin (USA)

June 30, 2004	(Georgia (U.S. state)) Atlanta Silverbacks (A-League)	3–2 (asdet)	(North Carolina) Carolina Dynamo (PDL)	Greensboro, North Carolina
	Chacon 50'; Ball 75'; Godoy 120+1'	(Report)	Storey 12'; Rhyne 90+1'	Stadium: Macpherson Stadium; Attendance: -- Referee: Abbas Piran (USA)

June 30, 2004	Virginia Beach Mariners (A-League)	0–2	(Texas) Dallas Burn (MLS)	Duncanville, Texas
		(Report)	Nhleko 20'; O'Brien 23'	Stadium: Old Panther Stadium; Attendance: -- Referee: Kevin Terry (USA)

June 30, 2004	(Colorado) Boulder Rapids Reserve (PDL)	1–2 (asdet)	Minnesota Thunder (A-League)	Saint Paul, Minnesota
	Pulido 42'	(Report)	Castellanos 19'; Juarez 116'	Stadium: James Griffin Stadium; Attendance: 1,259; Referee: Troy Cohrs (USA)

June 30, 2004	(North Carolina) Wilmington Hammerheads (PSL)	0–2	(South Carolina) Charleston Battery (A-League)	Charleston, South Carolina
		(Report)	Conway 2', 44'	Stadium: Blackbaud Stadium; Attendance: 1,255; Referee: Chris Kenny (USA)

June 30, 2004	(Illinois) Chicago Fire Reserves (PDL)	0–1	(New York (state)) Rochester Raging Rhinos (A-League)	Rochester, New York
		(Report)	Demmin 82'	Stadium: Frontier Field; Attendance: 7,654; Referee: Ken Heller (USA)

June 30, 2004	(New York (state)) Syracuse Salty Dogs (A-League)	1–2	(Ohio) Columbus Crew (MLS)	Columbus, Ohio
	Schweitzer 81'	(Report)	Buddle 70'; Paule 90+1' (pen.)	Stadium: Crew Stadium; Attendance: 5,288; Referee: Hilario Grajeda (USA)

June 30, 2004	(Oregon) Portland Timbers (A-League)	2–1	Utah Blitzz (PSL)	Salt Lake City, Utah
	Alvarez 33'; Bengard 41'	(Report)	Afash 65'	Stadium: Rice-Eccles Stadium; Attendance: -- Referee: Craig Burns (USA)

=== Fourth round ===
July 14, 2004	(California) San Jose Earthquakes (MLS)	3–0	(Oregon) Portland Timbers (A-League)	Portland, Oregon
	Ekelund 18' (pen.); Corrales 55'; De Rosario 80'	(Report)		Stadium: PGE Park; Attendance: 10,622; Referee: Richard Heron (USA)

July 20, 2004	(New York (state)) Rochester Raging Rhinos (A-League)	1–1 (asdet) (3–1 p)	(Massachusetts) New England Revolution (MLS)	Ludlow, Massachusetts
	Wilson 61'	(Report)	Noonan 7'	Stadium: Lusitano Stadium; Attendance: 1,585; Referee: Ricardo Salazar (USA)
	Penalties
	Miller (penalty missed); Dammin (penalty scored); Aguilera (penalty scored); Mendes (penalty scored)		(penalty missed) Heaps; (penalty scored) Twellman; (penalty missed) Dempsey; (penalty missed) Noonan

July 20, 2004	Kansas City Wizards (MLS)	4–1	(Georgia (U.S. state)) Atlanta Silverbacks (A-League)	Clarkston, Georgia
	Arnaud 10', 52'; Gomez 54'; Gutiérrez 81'	(Report)	Chacon 40'	Stadium: DeKalb Memorial Stadium; Attendance: 2,212; Referee: Ricardo Valenzuela (USA)

July 20, 2004	(California) Los Angeles Galaxy (MLS)	0–1	Minnesota Thunder (A-League)	Minneapolis, Minnesota
		(Report)	Brunt 21'	Stadium: H.H.H. Metrodome; Attendance: 5,505; Referee: Hilario Grajeda (USA)

July 20, 2004	Colorado Rapids (MLS)	0–3	(Texas) Dallas Burn (MLS)	Dallas, Texas
		(Report)	O'Brien 60'; Johnson 67', 75'	Stadium: Cotton Bowl; Attendance: -- Referee: Marcel Yonan (USA)

July 20, 2004	(Illinois) Chicago Fire (MLS)	2–1 (asdet)	(Ohio) Columbus Crew (MLS)	Columbus, Ohio
	Ralph 66' (pen.); Ralph 106'	(Report)	Hejduk 27'	Stadium: Crew Stadium; Attendance: 5,426; Referee: Ali Saheli (USA)

July 20, 2004	(New Jersey) MetroStars (MLS)	0–1	(South Carolina) Charleston Battery (A-League)	Charleston, South Carolina
		(Report)	Klein 48'	Stadium: Blackbaud Stadium; Attendance: 2,200; Referee: Abbey Okulaja (USA)

July 21, 2004	(Washington, D.C.) D.C. United (MLS)	1–2	(Virginia) Richmond Kickers (A-League)	Richmond, Virginia
	Kuffour 82'	(Report)	Cephas 33', 64'	Stadium: University of Richmond Stadium; Attendance: 8,776; Referee: Hector Tobin (USA)

=== Quarterfinals ===
August 4, 2004	(Texas) Dallas Burn (MLS)	0–4	Kansas City Wizards (MLS)	Overland Park, Kansas
		(Report)	Klein 52'; Arnaud 57'; Detter 73'; Zotinca 88'	Stadium: Blue Valley Athletic Complex; Attendance: 2,143; Referee: Terry Vaughn (USA)

August 4, 2004	(California) San Jose Earthquakes (MLS)	2–2 (asdet) (5–4 p)	Minnesota Thunder (A-League)	Saint Paul, Minnesota
	Ching 24'; Donovan 63'	(Report)	Tarley 4'; Branan 77'	Stadium: James Griffin Stadium; Attendance: 5,688; Referee: Richard Heron (USA)
	Penalties
	Donovan (penalty scored); Ching (penalty scored); Mulrooney (penalty scored); De Rosario (penalty scored); Dunivant (penalty scored)		(penalty scored) Menyongar; (penalty missed) Albert; (penalty scored) Matteo; (penalty scored) Branan; (penalty scored) Ferruzzi

August 4, 2004	(Illinois) Chicago Fire (MLS)	1–0	(Virginia) Richmond Kickers (A-League)	Richmond, Virginia
	Selolwane 56'	(Report)		Stadium: University of Richmond Stadium; Attendance: 5,712; Referee: Alex Prus (USA)

August 4, 2004	(South Carolina) Charleston Battery (A-League)	1–0	(New York (state)) Rochester Raging Rhinos (A-League)	Rochester, New York
	Valencia 6'	(Report)		Stadium: Frontier Field; Attendance: 7,016; Referee: Augusto Silva (USA)

=== Semifinals ===
August 24, 2004	(California) San Jose Earthquakes (MLS)	0–1	Kansas City Wizards (MLS)	Overland Park, Kansas
		(Report)	Simutenkov 45' (pen.)	Stadium: Blue Valley Sports Complex; Attendance: 2,162; Referee: Kevin Terry (USA)

August 25, 2004	(South Carolina) Charleston Battery (A-League)	0–1 (asdet)	(Illinois) Chicago Fire (MLS)	Naperville, Illinois
		(Report)	Selolwane 107'	Stadium: Benedetti-Wehrli Stadium; Attendance: 1,847; Referee: Michael Kennedy (USA)

=== Final ===
September 22, 2004

(Illinois) Chicago Fire (MLS)	0–1 (asdet)	Kansas City Wizards (MLS)
	(Report) TV: GOL TV (US Soccer report)	Simutenkov 95'

Arrowhead Stadium; Kansas City, Missouri
Attendance: 8,819
Referee: Terry Vaughn (USA)

Chicago Fire	Kansas City Wizards

== Top scorers ==
Position	Player	Club	Goals
1	Julian Nash	Chicago Fire Reserves	4
2	Marcus Storey	Carolina Dynamo	3
	Stephen Rhyne	Carolina Dynamo	3
	Davy Arnaud	Kansas City Wizards	3
	Byron Carmichael	South Jersey Barons	3

== See also ==
- United States Soccer Federation
- Lamar Hunt U.S. Open Cup
- Major League Soccer
- United Soccer Leagues
- USASA
- National Premier Soccer League
