= 2002 MLS SuperDraft =

College draft for soccer teams

General information
- Sport: Soccer
- Date: January 11–February 10, 2002
- Location: Lake Buena Vista, Florida

Overview
- 70 total selections in 6 rounds
- Teams: 10
- Merging teams: Miami Fusion; Tampa Bay Mutiny (both folded after 2001 season)
- First selection: Chris Gbandi; Dallas Burn

The 2002 Major League Soccer SuperDraft was held on February 10, 2002 in Lake Buena Vista, Florida.

One month earlier, MLS had contracted two clubs: Tampa Bay Mutiny and Miami Fusion. In conjunction with the contraction, the league conducted both an allocation draft and a dispersal draft in which the top 2002 SuperDraft picks of Tampa Bay and Miami, as well as players from those clubs, were made available to remaining MLS clubs.

== Allocation draft ==
MLS distributed the players of the Miami Fusion and the Tampa Bay Mutiny to the rest of the league via an allocation draft that took place on January 11, 2002, where teams with excess allocations were allowed to select from their players; the participants and the selection order for the draft were announced three days before the draft was conducted.

Pick	MLS Team	Player	Position	Previous team
1	Colorado Rapids	Pablo Mastroeni	Midfielder	Miami Fusion
2	New England Revolution	Mamadou Diallo	Forward	Tampa Bay Mutiny
3	D.C. United	Nick Rimando	Goalkeeper	Miami Fusion
4	MetroStars (Note: #4: Colorado Rapids → MetroStars. 11 January 2002: MetroStars acquired this selection from Colorado in exchange for midfielder Mark Chung, a second-round pick in the 2002 MLS SuperDraft, and a third-round pick in the 2002 MLS SuperDraft.)	Diego Serna	Forward	Miami Fusion
5	New England Revolution	Carlos Llamosa	Defender	Miami Fusion
6	New England Revolution	Steve Ralston	Midfielder	Tampa Bay Mutiny
7	Dallas Burn	#1 Pick, 2002 MLS SuperDraft	--	Tampa Bay Mutiny
8	San Jose Earthquakes (Note: #8: Los Angeles Galaxy → San Jose Earthquakes. 11 January 2002: San Jose acquired this selection from Los Angeles in exchange for the #9 selection and a second-round pick in the 2002 MLS SuperDraft.)	Devin Barclay	Forward	Tampa Bay Mutiny
9	Los Angeles Galaxy (Note: #9: San Jose Earthquakes → Los Angeles Galaxy. 11 January 2002: Los Angeles acquired this selection and a second-round pick in the 2002 MLS SuperDraft from San Jose in exchange for the #8 selection.)	Tyrone Marshall	Midfielder	Miami Fusion

== Dispersal draft ==
Players who were not selected in the allocation draft were automatically assigned to the dispersal draft, which was held hours after the allocation draft occurred.

=== Round 1 ===
Pick	MLS Team	Player	Position	Previous team
1	Colorado Rapids	Chris Henderson	Midfielder	Miami Fusion
2	New England Revolution	Jim Rooney	Midfielder	Miami Fusion
3	D.C. United	Lazo Alavanja	Midfielder	Miami Fusion
4	Kansas City Wizards	Eric Quill	Midfielder	Tampa Bay Mutiny
5	Dallas Burn	Josh Keller	Midfielder	Tampa Bay Mutiny
6	MetroStars	#3 pick, 2002 MLS SuperDraft	--	Tampa Bay Mutiny
7	Columbus Crew	Brian Dunseth	Defender	Miami Fusion
8	Chicago Fire	#10 pick, 2002 MLS SuperDraft	--	Miami Fusion
9	Columbus Crew (Note: #9: Los Angeles Galaxy → Columbus Crew. 11 January 2002: Columbus acquired this selection from Los Angeles in exchange for a conditional selection in the 2002 MLS SuperDraft.)	Eric Denton	Defender	Tampa Bay Mutiny
10	San Jose Earthquakes	PASS	--	--

=== Round 2 ===
Pick	MLS Team	Player	Position	Previous team
11	Colorado Rapids	Kyle Beckerman	Midfielder	Miami Fusion
12	New England Revolution	Alex Pineda Chacon	Midfielder	Miami Fusion
13	D.C. United	PASS	--	--
14	Kansas City Wizards	Preki	Midfielder	Miami Fusion
15	Dallas Burn	Jeff Cassar	Goalkeeper	Miami Fusion
16	MetroStars	PASS	--	--
17	Columbus Crew	PASS	--	--
18	Chicago Fire	PASS	--	--
19	Los Angeles Galaxy	PASS	--	--
20	San Jose Earthquakes	PASS	--	--

=== Round 3 ===
Pick	MLS Team	Player	Position	Previous team
21	Colorado Rapids	PASS	--	--
22	New England Revolution	Shaker Asad	Midfielder	Miami Fusion
23	D.C. United	PASS	--	--
24	Kansas City Wizards	PASS	--	--
25	Dallas Burn	PASS	--	--
26	MetroStars	PASS	--	--
27	Columbus Crew	PASS	--	--
28	Chicago Fire	PASS	--	--
29	Los Angeles Galaxy	PASS	--	--
30	San Jose Earthquakes	PASS	--	--

== SuperDraft ==
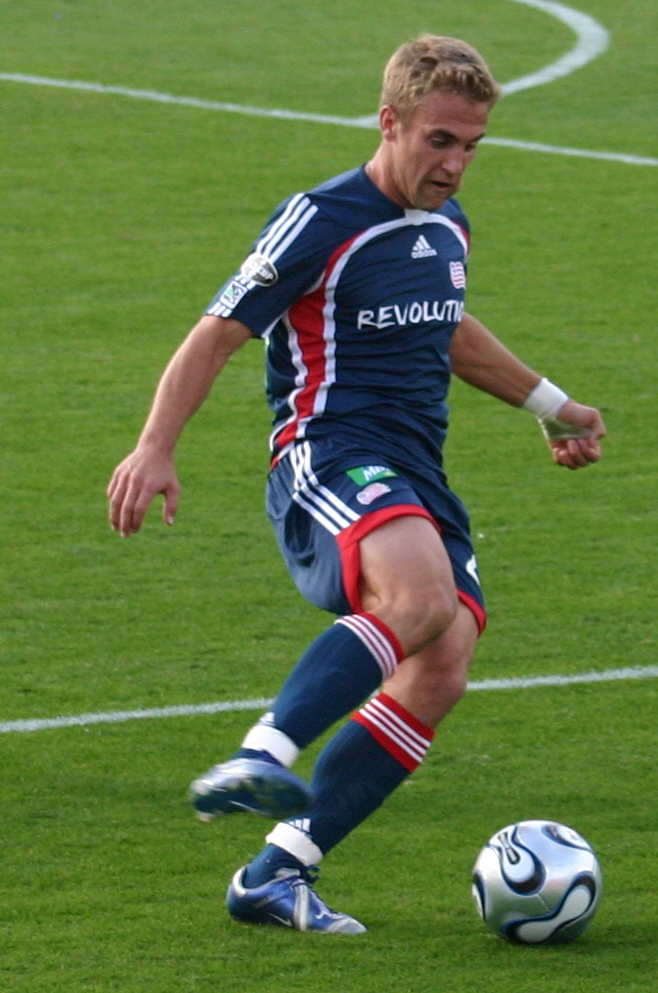
The New England Revolution selected Taylor Twellman second overall. The 2x MLS Best XI selection won the 2005 MLS Most Valuable Player award and is a member of the MLS 100 Goal Club.

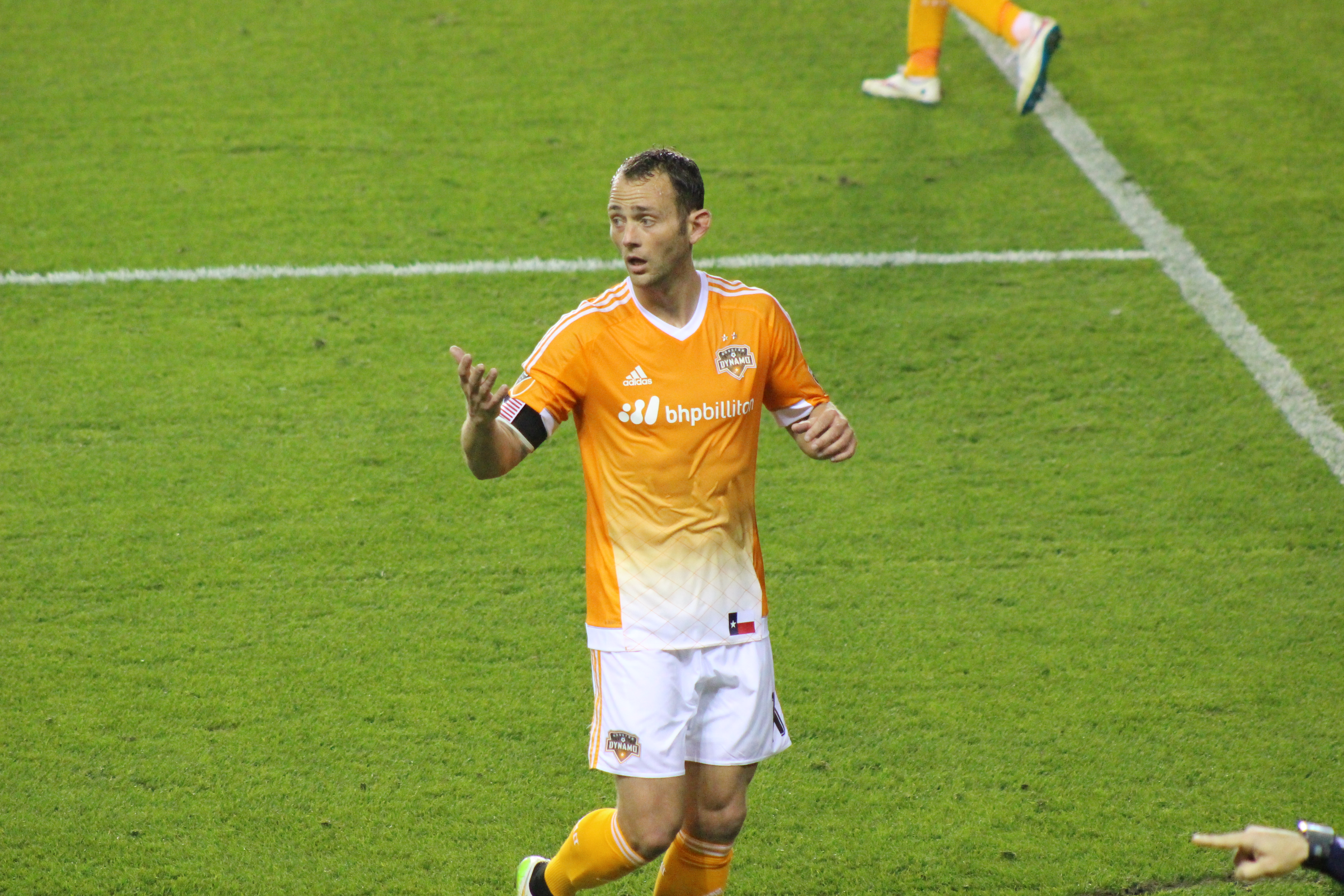
The MetroStars selected Brad Davis 3rd overall. The 2001 MLS Best XI selection earned 17 caps for the US Men's National Team and was selected to the 2014 FIFA World Cup squad.

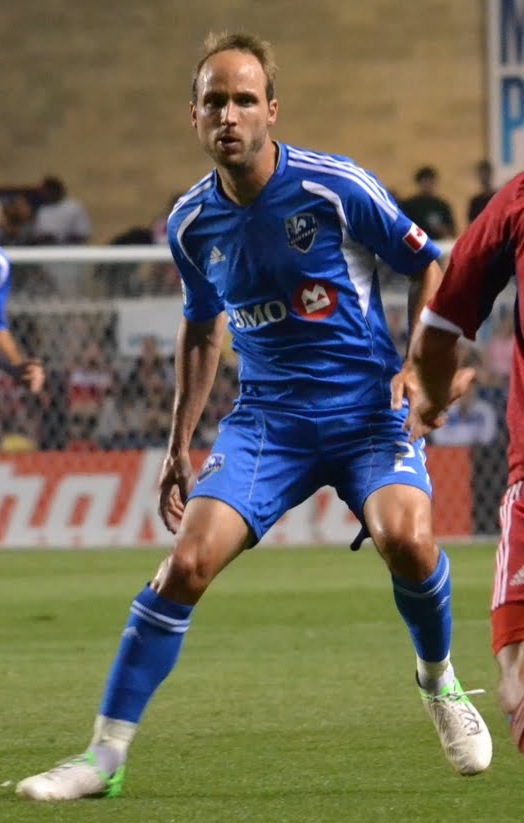
D.C. United selected Justin Mapp 4th overall. He was selected to the 2006 MLS Best XI.

Key

*	Denotes a player contracted under the Project-40 program
^	Denotes player who has been selected to an MLS All-Star Game
§	Denotes a player who won the MLS Rookie of the Year
†	Denotes player who has been selected for an MLS Best XI team
~	Denotes a player who won the MLS MVP

=== Round 1 ===
Pick #	MLS team	Player	Position	Affiliation
1	Dallas Burn (Note: #1: Tampa Bay Mutiny → Dallas Burn. 2002-01-11: Dallas Burn acquired this first-round pick from Tampa Bay Mutiny in the 2002 MLS Allocation Draft.)	Chris Gbandi	D	University of Connecticut
2	New England Revolution (Note: #2: Colorado Rapids → Tampa Bay Mutiny → New England Revolution. ...On 2001-06-28, Tampa Bay had acquired this pick, goalkeeper Adin Brown, and defender Scott Vermillion from Colorado Rapids in exchange for midfielder Carlos Valderrama, goalkeeper Scott Garlick and defender Ritchie Kotschau. More information needed.)	Taylor Twellman^†~	F	1860 Munich
3	MetroStars (Note: #3: New England Revolution → Colorado Rapids? → Tampa Bay Mutiny → MetroStars. 2002-01-11: MetroStars acquired this first-round pick from Tampa Bay Mutiny in the 2002 MLS Dispersal Draft. More information needed.)	Brad Davis*^†	M	St. Louis University (P-40)
4	D.C. United	Justin Mapp*^†	M	Project-40
5	Chicago Fire (Note: #5: Kansas City Wizards → Chicago Fire. 2002-02-08: Chicago Fire acquired this first-round pick from Kansas City Wizards in exchange for midfielder Diego Gutiérrez and a sixth-round pick in the 2002 SuperDraft.)	Kelly Gray*	M	University of Portland (P-40)
6	San Jose Earthquakes (Note: #6: Dallas Burn → San Jose Earthquakes. 2002-02-10: San Jose Earthquakes acquired this first-round pick from Dallas Burn in exchange for two first-round selections (#9 and #12) in the 2002 SuperDraft.)	Luchi Gonzalez	F	Southern Methodist University
7	MetroStars	Mansour Ndiaye	M	University of Connecticut
8	Columbus Crew	Kyle Martino*^§	M	University of Virginia (P-40)
9	Dallas Burn (Note: #9: Chicago Fire → San Jose Earthquakes → Dallas Burn. 2002-02-10: Dallas Burn acquired this first-round pick and the #12 first-round pick from San Jose Earthquakes in exchange for a first-round selection in the 2002 SuperDraft. On 2000-03-15, San Jose had acquired this pick, two second-round picks in the 2001 MLS SuperDraft, and future considerations from Chicago Fire in exchange for an allocation. Chicago used the allocation to sign Hristo Stoichkov.)	Carl Bussey	D	Southern Methodist University
10	Chicago Fire (Note: #10: Miami Fusion → Chicago Fire. 2002-01-11: Chicago Fire acquired this first-round pick from Miami Fusion in the 2002 MLS Dispersal Draft.)	Billy Sleeth	D	University of Washington
11	D.C. United (Note: #11: Los Angeles Galaxy → D.C. United. 2002-01-12: D.C. United acquired this first-round pick, a second-round pick, and a second-round pick in the 2003 MLS SuperDraft from Los Angeles Galaxy in exchange for forward Chris Albright and a second-round pick in the 2002 SuperDraft.)	Daouda Kanté	D	Florida International University
12	Dallas Burn (Note: #12: San Jose Earthquakes → Dallas Burn. 2002-02-10: Dallas Burn acquired this first-round pick and the #9 first-round pick from San Jose Earthquakes in exchange for a first-round selection in the 2002 SuperDraft.)	Lee Morrison	D	Stanford University

=== Round 2 ===
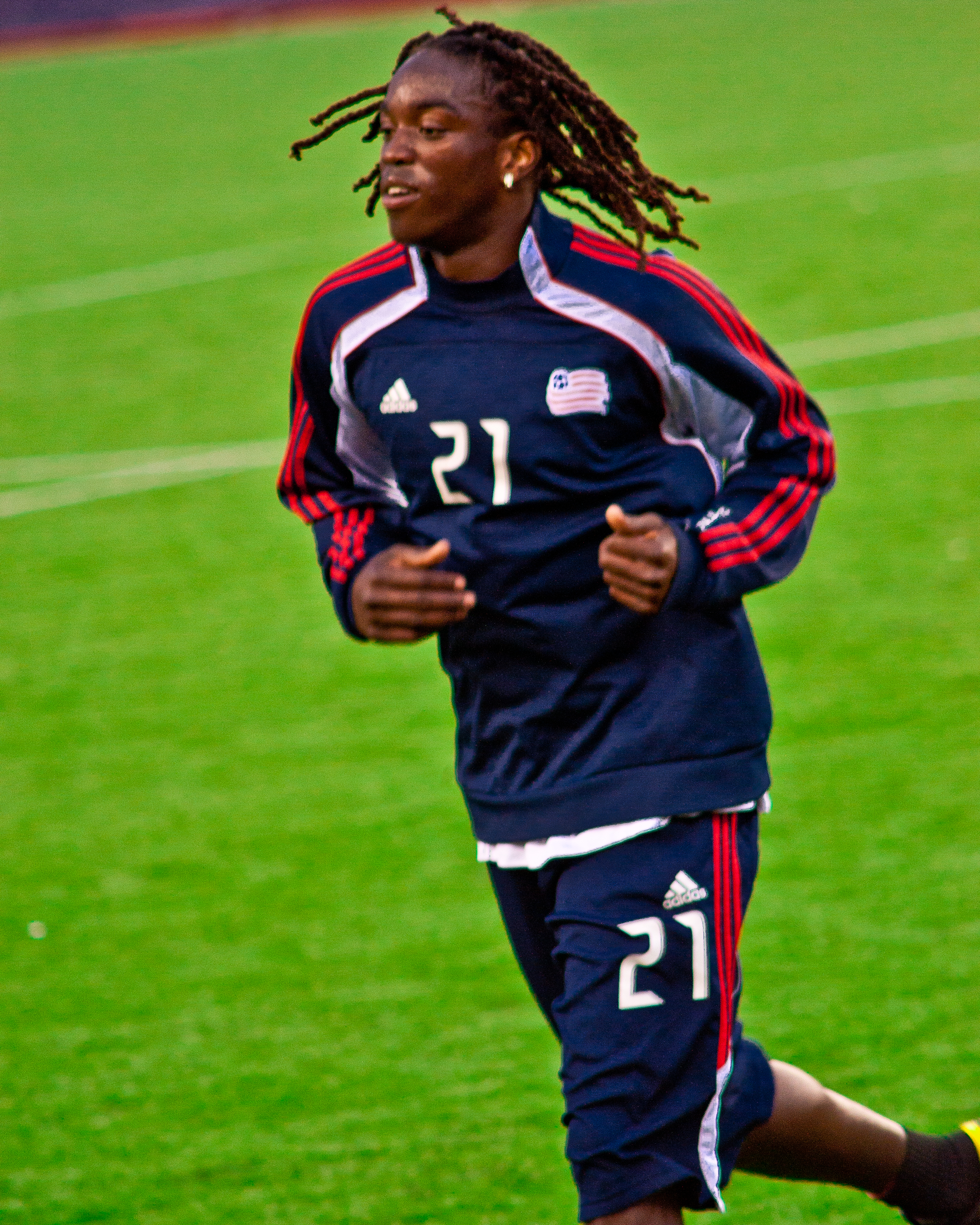
New England selected Shalrie Joseph 14th overall. Joseph is a 4x MLS Best XI selection and earned 20 caps with the Grenada National Football Team.

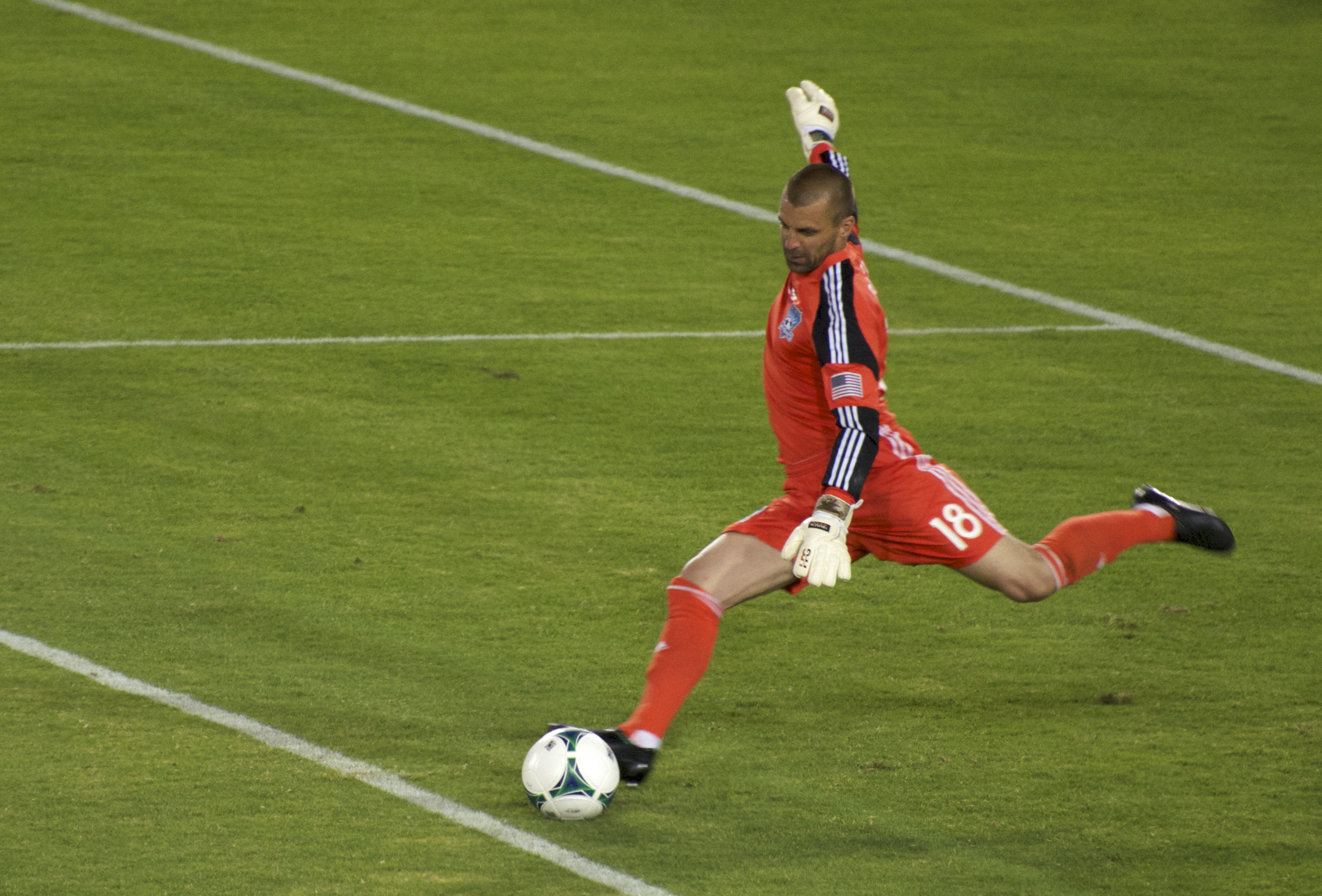
The Columbus Crew selected Jon Busch 23rd overall. In 2008, he won the MLS Goalkeeper of the Year Award and was selected to the MLS Best XI..

Pick #	MLS team	Player	Position	Affiliation
13	Los Angeles Galaxy (Note: #13: Tampa Bay Mutiny → Colorado Rapids → Los Angeles Galaxy. 2001-04-02: Los Angeles Galaxy acquired this second-round pick and a first-round pick in the 2003 MLS SuperDraft from Colorado Rapids in exchange for defender Robin Fraser. The trade was originally announced as Fraser in exchange for second-round SuperDraft picks in 2002, 2003, and 2004. However, a Galaxy press release on 13 January 2003 stated that the 2003 pick had become a first-round selection. There was no 2004 draft pick traded between Los Angeles and Colorado. On 2000-04-19, Colorado acquired this pick and a third-round pick in the 2001 MLS SuperDraft from Tampa Bay Mutiny in exchange for midfielder Kevin Anderson.)	Hemir Neibles	M	Brooklyn Knights
14	New England Revolution (Note: #14: Colorado Rapids → New England Revolution. 2001-03-19: New England Revolution acquired this second-round pick, forward Matt Okoh, and defender Alan Woods from Colorado Rapids in exchange for midfielders Imad Baba and Carlos Parra.)	Shalrie Joseph^†	M	St. John's University
15	Dallas Burn (Note: #15: New England Revolution → Miami Fusion → Dallas Burn. 2001-05-10: Dallas Burn acquired this second-round pick and another second-round pick (#23) in the 2002 SuperDraft from Miami in exchange for midfielder Lazo Alavanja. The #23 pick was to have been in the 2003 MLS SuperDraft but was converted to 2002 after the Miami franchise was contracted. More information needed on the trade from New England to Miami.)	Jordan Stone*	M	Project-40
16	Colorado Rapids (Note: #16: D.C. United → Tampa Bay Mutiny → Colorado Rapids → MetroStars → Colorado Rapids. 2000-05-26: Tampa Bay Mutiny acquired this pick, two first-round selections in the 2001 MLS SuperDraft, and midfielder John Maessner from D.C. United in exchange for forward Raúl Díaz Arce and forward Pete Marino. On 2001-03-30, Colorado Rapids acquired this pick and a third-round pick in the 2003 SuperDraft from Tampa Bay Mutiny in exchange for forward Gus Kartes. The 2003 SuperDraft pick was converted to pick #28 in the 2002 SuperDraft when Tampa Bay was contracted following the 2001 season. 2001-04-19: MetroStars acquired this pick from Colorado Rapids in exchange for midfielder Chris Dawes. 2001-08-09: Colorado Rapids re-acquired this selection and midfielder Steve Shak from MetroStars in exchange for a third-round selection (#29) in the 2002 SuperDraft and midfielder Ross Paule.)	Danny Jackson	D	University of North Carolina
17	Chicago Fire (Note: #17: Kansas City Wizards → San Jose Earthquakes → Dallas Burn → Chicago Fire. 2002-02-10: Chicago Fire acquired this second-round selection from Dallas Burn in exchange for future considerations, which were later revealed as the MLS rights to midfielder Ronnie O'Brien. On 2002-02-08, Dallas had acquired this pick and forward Ronald Cerritos from San Jose Earthquakes in exchange for forward Ariel Graziani and salary cap relief. On 2001-03-13, San Jose had acquired this pick, originally a conditional selection, and a third-round pick in the 2003 MLS SuperDraft, also originally a conditional selection, from Kansas City Wizards in exchange for defender Mike Burns.)	Craig Capano*	M	Project-40
18	Dallas Burn	Matt Behncke	D	Princeton University
19	Colorado Rapids (Note: #19: MetroStars → Colorado Rapids. 2002-01-11: Colorado Rapids acquired this second-round selection, a third-round pick (#29) in the 2002 MLS SuperDraft, and midfielder Mark Chung from MetroStars in exchange for the #4 selection in the 2002 MLS Allocation Draft)	Jeff Stewart	D	Santa Clara University
20	Columbus Crew	Jeff Matteo	M	St. John's University
21	New England Revolution (Note: #21: Chicago Fire → New England Revolution. 2001-05-03: New England Revolution acquired this second-round pick, originally a conditional selection, and forward John Wolyniec from Chicago Fire in exchange for forward Eric Wynalda. Confirmation needed.)	Ian Fuller	F	Clemson University
22	Los Angeles Galaxy (Note: #22: Miami Fusion → D.C. United → Los Angeles Galaxy. 2002-01-12: Los Angeles Galaxy acquired this second-round pick and forward Chris Albright from D.C. United in exchange for first-round and second-round picks in the 2002 SuperDraft and a second-round pick in the 2003 MLS SuperDraft On 2001-02-05, D.C. United had acquired this pick from Miami Fusion in exchange for the #18 pick in the 2001 MLS SuperDraft.)	Bryheem Hancock	G	University of Connecticut
23	Columbus Crew (Note: #23: Miami Fusion (2003) → Dallas Burn → Columbus Crew. 2002-01-15: Columbus Crew acquired this second-round selection from Dallas Burn in exchange for a fourth-round selection in the 2002 SuperDraft and defender Tenywa Bonseu. On 2001-05-10, Dallas had acquired this second-round pick and another second-round pick (#15) in the 2002 SuperDraft from Miami in exchange for midfielder Lazo Alavanja. This #23 pick was to have been in the 2003 MLS SuperDraft but was converted to 2002 after the Miami franchise was contracted.)	Jon Busch†	G	Hershey Wildcats
24	D.C. United (Note: #24: Los Angeles Galaxy → D.C. United. 2002-01-12: D.C. United acquired this second-round pick, a first-round pick, and a second-round pick in the 2003 MLS SuperDraft from Los Angeles Galaxy in exchange for forward Chris Albright and a second-round pick in the 2002 SuperDraft.)	Mike McGinty	G	Richmond Kickers
25	Los Angeles Galaxy (Note: #25: San Jose Earthquakes → Los Angeles Galaxy. 2002-01-11: Los Angeles Galaxy acquired this second-round pick and the #9 selection in the 2002 MLS Allocation Draft from San Jose Earthquakes in exchange for the #8 selection in the 2002 MLS Allocation Draft.)	Gavin Glinton	F	Bradley University

=== Round 3 ===
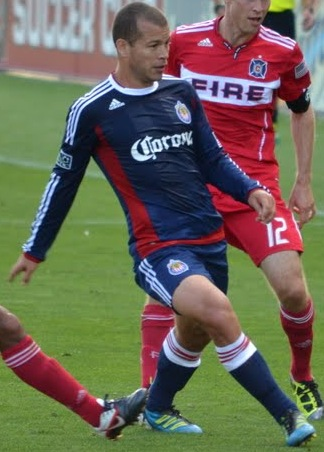
The LA Galaxy selected Alejandro Moreno 27th overall. He is a 3x MLS Cup winner and 3x Supporters' Shield winner. He earned 41 caps with the Venezuela National Team.

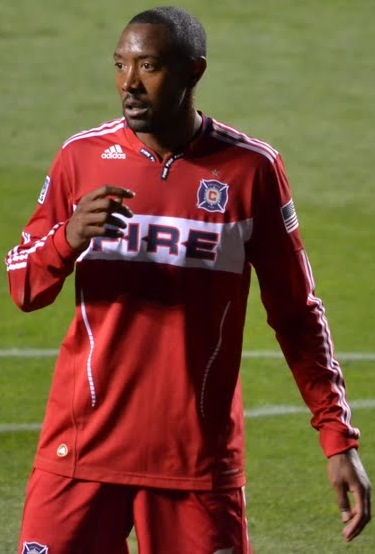
The Galaxy selected Cory Gibbs 38th overall. Gibbs did not sign and joined then Bundesliga side FC St. Pauli. Gibbs would sign with the Dallas Burn in 2004. Gibbs was named to the US national team's 2006 FIFA World Cup squad, but he re-injured his right knee and was replaced by Gregg Berhalter.

Pick #	MLS team	Player	Position	Affiliation
26	Chicago Fire (Note: #26: Tampa Bay Mutiny → Chicago Fire. 2001-08-10: Chicago Fire acquired this third-round pick from Tampa Bay Mutiny in exchange for defender Diego Sonora.)	Steve Totten	M	University of Virginia
27	Los Angeles Galaxy (Note: #27: Tampa Bay Mutiny (2003) → Los Angeles Galaxy. 2001-07-20: Los Angeles Galaxy acquired this third-round pick from Tampa Bay Mutiny in exchange for midfielder Danny Pena. This pick was to have been in the 2003 MLS SuperDraft but was converted to 2002 after the Tampa Bay franchise was contracted.)	Alejandro Moreno	F	UNC-Greensboro
28	Colorado Rapids (Note: #28: Tampa Bay Mutiny (2003) → Colorado Rapids. 2001-03-30: Colorado Rapids acquired this 2003 third-round pick and a second-round pick in the 2002 SuperDraft from Tampa Bay Mutiny in exchange for forward Gus Kartes. The 2003 draft pick was converted to this #28 selection in the 2002 SuperDraft when Tampa Bay was contracted following the 2001 season.)	Bryn Ritchie	D	University of Washington
29	Colorado Rapids (Note: #29: Colorado Rapids → MetroStars → Colorado Rapids. 2002-01-11: Colorado Rapids re-acquired this selection, a second-round pick (#19) in the 2002 MLS SuperDraft, and midfielder Mark Chung from MetroStars in exchange for the #4 selection in the 2002 MLS Allocation Draft On 2001-08-09, MetroStars had acquired this pick and midfielder Ross Paule from Colorado Rapids in exchange for a second-round pick (#16) in the 2002 SuperDraft and midfielder Steve Shak.)	Daniel Alvarez	M	Furman University
30	MetroStars (Note: #30: New England Revolution → MetroStars. 2002-01-11: MetroStars acquired this third-round pick from New England Revolution in exchange for a third-round selection in the 2003 MLS SuperDraft.)	Sam Forko	D	University of Connecticut
31	D.C. United	Mohammed Fahim	F	Southern Methodist University
32	Kansas City Wizards	O'Neil Peart	F	Long Island Rough Riders
33	San Jose Earthquakes (Note: #33: Dallas Burn → San Jose Earthquakes. 2002-02-10: San Jose Earthquakes acquired this third-round pick from Dallas Burn in exchange for a third-round selection in the 2003 MLS SuperDraft)	Chris Roner	M	University of California
34	Colorado Rapids (Note: #34: MetroStars → Colorado Rapids. 2002-01-11: Colorado Rapids acquired this third-round pick from MetroStars in exchange for defender Marcelo Balboa.)	Matt Moses	M	Stanford University
35	Columbus Crew	John Barry Nusum	F	Furman University
36	Chicago Fire	Dipsy Selolwane	F	St. Louis University
37	Kansas City Wizards (Note: #37: Miami Fusion → Kansas City Wizards. 2001-03-02: Kansas City Wizards acquired this third-round selection and allocation money from Miami Fusion in exchange for forward Preki.)	Chris Brunt	D	Southwest Missouri State
38	Los Angeles Galaxy (Note: #38: Los Angeles Galaxy → Columbus Crew → Los Angeles Galaxy. 2002-01-11: Los Angeles Galaxy re-acquired this third-round selection, originally a conditional pick, from Columbus Crew in exchange for the #9 selection in the 2002 MLS Dispersal Draft. On 2001-08-15, Columbus had acquired this pick, originally a conditional pick, from Los Angeles in exchange for the rights to forward McKinley Tennyson.)	Cory Gibbs^	D	Brown University
39	San Jose Earthquakes	Kevin Sakuda	D	Duke University

=== Round 4 ===
Pick #	MLS team	Player	Position	Affiliation
40	D.C. United (Note: #40: Colorado Rapids → D.C. United. 2001-06-13: D.C. United acquired this fourth-round pick, originally a conditional selection, from Colorado Rapids in exchange for forward Raúl Díaz Arce. Confirmation needed.)	Dennis Ludwig	F	Rutgers University
41	New England Revolution	Derek Potteiger	M	Penn State
42	D.C. United	Bobby Brennan	D	American University
43	Kansas City Wizards	Dominic DaPra	F	University of Wisconsin–Madison
44	Dallas Burn (Note: #44: Dallas Burn → Columbus Crew → Dallas Burn. 2002-01-15: Dallas Burn re-acquired this fourth-round selection and defender Tenywa Bonseu from Columbus Crew in exchange for a second-round selection in the 2002 SuperDraft. On 2001-03-21, Columbus had acquired this pick from Dallas in exchange for midfielder Miles Joseph.)	Adauto Neto	M	University of Mobile
45	New England Revolution (Note: #45: Columbus Crew → New England Revolution. 2001-05-11: New England Revolution acquired this fourth-round selection, originally a conditional pick, and midfielder Roland Vargas-Aguilera from Columbus Crew in exchange for midfielder John Harkes. Confirmation needed.)	Marshall Leonard	D	University of Virginia
46	Chicago Fire	Mike Nugent	F	Princeton University
47	Columbus Crew (Note: #47: Miami Fusion → Columbus Crew. 2001-08-15: Columbus Crew acquired this fourth-round selection, originally a conditional pick, from Miami Fusion in exchange for midfielder Ian Woan.)	Chris Leitch	D	University of North Carolina
48	Los Angeles Galaxy	Noah Delgado	M	Fresno State
49	San Jose Earthquakes	Erik Ozimek	M	Davidson College

=== Round 5 ===
Pick #	MLS team	Player	Position	Affiliation
50	Kansas City Wizards (Note: #50: Tampa Bay Mutiny → Kansas City Wizards. 2001-02-05: Kansas City Wizards acquired this fifth-round pick from Tampa Bay Mutiny in exchange for a fifth-round selection in the 2001 MLS SuperDraft.)	Davy Arnaud^	F	West Texas A&M University
51	Columbus Crew (Note: #51: Colorado Rapids → New England Revolution → Columbus Crew. 2002-02-10: Columbus Crew acquired this fifth-round pick from New England Revolution in exchange for a sixth-round selection in the 2003 MLS SuperDraft.)	Christof Lindenmayer	F	Loyola College in Maryland
52	New England Revolution	PASS		
53	D.C. United	PASS		
54	Dallas Burn (Note: #54: Kansas City Wizards → Dallas Burn. 2002-01-23: Dallas Burn acquired this fifth-round pick from Kansas City Wizards in exchange for defender Eric Dade.)	Jeremie Piette	M	West Texas A&M University
55	Dallas Burn	Ricardo Villar	M	Penn State
56	MetroStars	Mario Gomez	M	North Jersey Imperials (PDL)
57	Kansas City Wizards (Note: #57: Columbus Crew → Kansas City Wizards. 2002-01-17: Kansas City Wizards acquired this fifth-round pick from Columbus Crew in exchange for the #4 selection in the 2002 MLS Waiver Draft.)	Brian Lavin	D	Yale University
58	New England Revolution (Note: #58: Chicago Fire → New England Revolution. 2001-04-10: New England Revolution acquired this fifth-round pick, originally a conditional selection, from Chicago Fire in exchange for forward Jamar Beasley. Confirmation needed.)	PASS		
59	Los Angeles Galaxy	Lawrence Smalls	M	UC Irvine
60	San Jose Earthquakes	Aaron Biddle	D	Stanford University

=== Round 6 ===
Pick #	MLS team	Player	Position	Affiliation
61	Colorado Rapids	Matt Harrell	F	University of Denver
62	New England Revolution	PASS		
63	D.C. United	PASS		
64	Kansas City Wizards	Dane Erickson	D	Davidson College
65	Kansas City Wizards (Note: #65: Dallas Burn → Chicago Fire → Kansas City Wizards. 2002-02-08: Kansas City Wizards acquired this sixth-round pick and midfielder Diego Gutiérrez from Chicago Fire in exchange for a first-round pick in the 2002 SuperDraft. On xxxx-xx-xx, Chicago had acquired this pick from Dallas Burn in exchange for a sixth-round selection in the 2001 MLS SuperDraft. More information needed.)	Mark Spears	G	William Carey College
66	MetroStars	Jeff Moore	M	Richard Stockton College
67	Columbus Crew	Scott Leber	D	Stanford University
68	MetroStars (Note: #68: Chicago Fire → Dallas Burn → MetroStars. 2002-02-10: MetroStars acquired this sixth-round pick from Dallas Burn in exchange for a sixth-round selection in the 2003 MLS SuperDraft. On 2002-01-15, Dallas Burn had acquired this sixth-round pick and a fourth-round pick in the 2003 MLS SuperDraft, originally a conditional selection, from Chicago Fire in exchange for forward Aleksey Korol and midfielder Miguel Saavedra.)	Leo Krupnik	D	UC Berkeley
69	Los Angeles Galaxy	Ishmael Mintah	M	Bradley University
70	San Jose Earthquakes	Lars Lyssand	M	San Jose State
