= Timothy O'Neill =

Timothy or Tim O'Neill or O'Neal may refer to:

- Timothy O'Neill (Daria), a character in the U.S. TV series Daria
- Timothy O'Neill (soccer) (born 1982), American soccer midfielder
- Tim O'Neill (Canadian football) (born 1979), Canadian football offensive lineman in the Canadian Football League
- Tim O'Neill (seaQuest), character from the 1990s television series seaQuest DSV
- Timothy O'Neal (golfer) (born 1972), American golfer
- Timothy O'Neill (camoufleur) (born 1943), American camouflage expert, designer of MARPAT
- Tim O'Neal (politician), member of the Pennsylvania House of Representatives

== See also ==
- Timmy O'Neill (born 1969), American rock climber, guide, and comedian
- Tim O'Neil, an American rally racing driver
