= 2004 National Amateur Cup =

Soccer tournament

Following are the results of the 2004 National Amateur Cup, the annual amateur cup held by the United States Adult Soccer Association.

== Region I ==
Quarterfinals

June 6, 2004
1:00PM

Fan Rats	3-2	Lighthouse

Richmond, VA
June 6, 2004
2:30PM

Jerry D's	2-1	Rahway Rio United

Baltimore, MD
June 13, 2004

German–American	W-L	Club La Carreta

June 13, 2004

Watertown United	W-L	Brooklyn Italians

Semifinals

June 20, 2004

German–American	L-W	Watertown United

June 20, 2004

Jerry D's	3-2	Fan Rats

Baltimore, MD

Final

July 11, 2004
3:30PM

Watertown United	1-0	Jerry D's

Horsham, PA

== Region II ==
Group A

June 18, 2004

Busch	2-0	Indiana Invaders

Milwaukee, WI
June 18, 2004

Detroit Eagles	4-4	Assyrian Winged Bull

Milwaukee, WI
June 19, 2004

Assyrian Winged Bull	4-3	Indiana Invaders

Milwaukee, WI
June 19, 2004

Busch	3-	Detroit Eagles

Milwaukee, WI
June 19, 2004

Assyrian Winged Bull	2-1	Busch

Milwaukee, WI
June 19, 2004

Detroit Eagles	3-3	Indiana Invaders

Milwaukee, WI

Group B

June 18, 2004

Inferno 95	4-1	NFC Ozymandias

Milwaukee, WI
June 18, 2004

Croatian Eagles	4-3	Irish Americans

Milwaukee, WI
June 19, 2004

Croatian Eagles	4-2	NFC Ozymandias

Milwaukee, WI
June 19, 2004

Inferno 95	4-2	Irish Americans

Milwaukee, WI
June 19, 2004

Inferno 95	3-1	Croatian Eagles

Milwaukee, WI
June 19, 2004

Irish Americans	5-4	NFC Ozymandias

Milwaukee, WI

Final

June 20, 2004
10:00AM

Assyrian Winged Bull	4-0	Inferno 95

Milwaukee, WI

== Region III ==
The Region III tournament took place at the SportPlex in Dallas, TX from May 28–31.

Group A

May 28, 2004
2:30PM

Estudiantes	1-3	Real Salvadoreno

Dallas, TX
May 28, 2004
2:30PM

Haz Benz	0-2	FC Celtic

Dallas, TX
May 29, 2004
9:00AM

Haz Benz	1-6	Estudiantes

Dallas, TX
May 29, 2004
9:00AM

FC Celtic	4-4	Real Salvadoreno

Dallas, TX
May 30, 2004
11:30AM

Real Salvadoreno	2-0	Haz Benz

Dallas, TX
May 30, 2004
11:30AM

Estudiantes	3-2	FC Celtic

Dallas, TX

Group B

May 28, 2004
2:30PM

Newcastle United	5-2	Planet 69

Dallas, TX
May 29, 2004
9:00AM

Kickers	1-3	Newcastle United

Dallas, TX
May 30, 2004
4:30PM

Planet 69	0-8	Kickers

Dallas, TX

Final

May 31, 2004
10:00AM

Real Salvadoreno	2-3	Newcastle United

Dallas, TX

== Region IV ==
The Region IV tournament took place in Albuquerque, NM from June 4–6.

Group A

June 4, 2004
3:00PM

Santa Clara Sporting	0-3	Denver Kickers

Albuquerque, NM
June 4, 2004
3:00PM

Atletico Espanol	1-4	Liverpool

Albuquerque, NM
June 5, 2004
9:00AM

Liverpool	0-6	Denver Kickers

Albuquerque, NM
June 5, 2004
9:00AM

Atletico Espanol	0-5	Santa Clara Sporting

Albuquerque, NM
June 5, 2004
3:00PM

Liverpool	1-8	Santa Clara Sporting

Albuquerque, NM
June 5, 2004
3:00PM

Denver Kickers	12-1	Atletico Espanol

Albuquerque, NM

Group B

June 4, 2004
3:00PM

Hibernian	4-4	Colorado Rocks

Albuquerque, NM
June 4, 2004
3:00PM

Utah Mix	1-3	Univ del Salvador

Albuquerque, NM
June 5, 2004
9:00AM

Univ del Salvador	2-3	Hibernian

Albuquerque, NM
June 5, 2004
9:00AM

Colorado Rocks	5-1	Utah Mix

Albuquerque, NM
June 5, 2004
3:00PM

Utah Mix	3-7	Hibernian

Albuquerque, NM
June 5, 2004
3:00PM

Colorado Rocks	5-0	Univ del Salvador

Albuquerque, NM

Final

June 6, 2004
9:00AM

Colorado Rocks	0-6	Denver Kickers

Albuquerque, NM

== National Championship ==
Semifinals

August 6, 2004
7:00PM

Newcastle United	2-3	Assyrian Winged Bull

Orlando, FL
August 6, 2004
8:00PM

Watertown United	2-3	Denver Kickers
2H' (pk); 2H'		1H' (2); 103'

Orlando, FL

Final

August 8, 2004
11:00AM

Denver Kickers	3-4	Assyrian Winged Bull
1H' (pk); 2H' (2)		1H' (4)

Orlando, FL

== U.S. Open Cup Qualifying ==
=== Region I ===
Quarterfinals

April 25, 2004

Northern United	2-5	Greek–American Atlas

April 25, 2004

Boston Olympiakos	1-1	Bridgeport Italians
Advanced on PKs 4–3		Sam Gillen

Boston, MA
April 25, 2004

LCC International	1–2	Sport Club Portuguese

April 25, 2004

Allied SC	2-1	Lighthouse

Semifinals

May 9, 2004

Greek–American Atlas	6-1	Boston Olympiakos

May 9, 2004

Sport Club Portuguese	0-1	Allied SC

Final

July 10, 2004

Greek–American Atlas	2-3	Allied SC
		40' Pat Crawford; 75' Pat Crawford (pk); 80' Bill Rinehardt

East Rutherford, NJ

=== Region II ===
April 25, 2004

Chaldean Arsenal	2-0	Reggae Boyz

Semifinals

April 25, 2004

Busch	1-2	SAC Wisla

May 9, 2004
1:00PM

Chaldean Arsenal	1-3	Milwaukee Bavarians
		Tyler Hawley; Chris Brisson; Ryan Seymour

Berkley, MI

Final

June 19, 2004

Milwaukee Bavarians	2-4	SAC Wisla

Milwaukee, WI

=== Region III ===
Round Robin

May 28, 2004
12:00PM

DS United	3-1	Brilla

Dallas, TX
May 28, 2004
12:00PM

Legends	4-0	Azzurri

Dallas, TX
May 29, 2004
2:00PM

Sunrise & OES	1-5	Azzurri

Dallas, TX
May 29, 2004
2:00PM

Brilla	0-2	Legends

Dallas, TX
May 30, 2004
9:00AM

Legends	2-1	DS United

Dallas, TX
May 30, 2004
9:00AM

Brilla	0-3	Sunrise & OES

Dallas, TX
May 31, 2004
8:00AM

DS United	3-2	Sunrise & OES

Dallas, TX
May 31, 2004
8:00AM

Azzurri	6-2	Brilla

Dallas, TX

Legends and Azzurri qualify for Open Cup.

=== Region IV ===
Group A

May 21, 2004
3:00PM

Tyneside United	1-2	Sacramento Knights

Sacramento, CA
May 21, 2004
3:00AM

Liverpool	3-0	Mexico FC

Sacramento, CA
May 22, 2004
9:00AM

Mexico FC	2-6	Tyneside United

Sacramento, CA
May 22, 2004
9:00AM

Sacramento Knights	1-1	Liverpool

Sacramento, CA
May 22, 2004
3:00PM

Tyneside United	1-5	Liverpool

Sacramento, CA
May 22, 2004
3:00PM

Mexico FC	0-8	Sacramento Knights

Sacramento, CA

Group B

May 21, 2004
5:00PM

Chico Rooks	1-0	Club Marin

Sacramento, CA
May 21, 2004
5:00PM

Banat Arsenal	10-0	Univ del Salvador

Sacramento, CA
May 22, 2004
11:00AM

Univ del Salvador	0-4	Chico Rooks

Sacramento, CA
May 22, 2004
11:00AM

Club Marin	0-1	Banat Arsenal

Sacramento, CA
May 22, 2004
5:00PM

Banat Arsenal	0-1	Chico Rooks

Sacramento, CA
May 22, 2004
5:00PM

Club Marin	3-0	Univ del Salvador

Sacramento, CA

Final

May 23, 2004
10:00AM

Sacramento Knights	0-0	Chico Rooks
		Chico advanced 6–5 on PKs

Sacramento, CA

=== National Semifinals ===
August 6, 2004
9:00AM

Legends	2-1	SAC Wisla

Orlando, FL
August 6, 2004
9:00AM

Allied SC	1-3	Chico Rooks
50' Tony Tamanini		10' Calum Robertson; 65' Chris Wondolowski; 75' Dustin Tong

Orlando, FL

=== National Final ===
August 7, 2004
8:00PM

Legends	1-3	Chico Rooks
48' Patrick Shamu		22', 40' Chris Wondolowski; 56' Jared Ramsey

Orlando, FL

== See also ==
2004 U.S. Open Cup
