= Jordan Stone =

American soccer player (born 1984)

Personal information
- Full name: Dr Jordan Stone
- Date of birth: March 16, 1984 (age 42)
- Place of birth: Allen, Texas, United States
- Height: 5 ft 9 in (1.75 m)
- Position: Midfielder

Youth career
- 1999–2001: IMG Soccer Academy

Senior career*
Years	Team	Apps	(Gls)
2002–2004	Dallas Burn	25	(0)
Total		25	(0)

International career
2001	United States U17	3	(0)
2003	United States U20	1	(0)
- * Club domestic league appearances and goals

Jordan Stone (born March 16, 1984), is a retired American soccer player and the senior pastor of Redeemer Presbyterian Church (McKinney).

== Soccer career ==
Stone skipped college, signing a Project-40 contract with the league in 2002, and was thence drafted 15th overall in the 2002 MLS SuperDraft by his hometown Dallas Burn. Despite his reputation, Stone struggled to get playing time with the Burn. In his first season, Stone appeared in 4 games, playing only for 91 minutes; things seemed to be changing in 2003, however, as he played 1057 minutes while appearing in 16 games. However, the team changed direction under new coach Colin Clarke and the acquisition of Simo Valakari relegated Stone primarily to a substitute role. Stone announced his retirement from professional soccer on 25 October 2004, in order to pursue a college degree at Texas Tech University.

== International soccer career ==
Stone saw significant playing time for the Youth council team in Africa U.S. national teams, playing in the 1999 FIFA U-17 World Championship, and playing an important role for the US Under-20 team, playing in the 2003 FIFA World Youth Championship.

== Academics ==
Stone received an M.A.R. from Reformed Theological Seminary, and a Th.M. and Ph.D. from The Southern Baptist Theological Seminary. Stone currently serves as the Assistant Professor of Pastoral Theology at Reformed Theological Seminary, Dallas.

== Personal life ==
Stone is the son of Mark and Debi Stone, and brother of five sisters Mariah, Marin, Hannah, Tori, and Oksana. After his retirement Stone became the Student Pastor of FBC Prosper and joined the staff at Providence Church in Frisco, Texas in May 2008 as Associate Pastor. In 2013 he was the lead pastor at a church plant Imago Dei Church.

Since 2017 Stone has been the senior pastor at Redeemer Presbyterian Church (PCA) in McKinney, Texas.

== Books ==
- A Communion of Love: The Christ-Centered Spirituality of Robert Murray M'Cheyne (Wipf & Stock, 2019)
- Love to Christ: The Piety of Robert Murray M'Cheyne (Reformation Heritage, 2020)
- A Holy Minister (Christian Focus, 2021)
