= Sam Forko =

Liberian footballer

Personal information
- Date of birth: 2 September 1988 (age 36)
- Place of birth: Monrovia, Liberia
- Height: 1.75 m (5 ft 9 in)
- Position(s): Defender

Senior career*
Years	Team	Apps	(Gls)
2002	New York MetroStars	9	(0)
- *Club domestic league appearances and goals

Sam Forko (born 2 September 1978) is a Liberian former footballer who played as a defender with the New York MetroStars in Major League Soccer. Forko was drafted in the 2002 MLS SuperDraft with the 30th pick out of the University of Connecticut. He played in 9 games with the MetroStars, starting 3 before being released. He is the brother of fellow Connecticut alumnus and Liberian international footballer Willis Forko.

== Sources ==
- Sam Forko MetroFanatic.com
