= Byron Foss =

American soccer player

Byran Foss
Personal information
- Date of birth: 6 October 1979 (age 47)
- Place of birth: Monarch Beach, California, U.S.
- Height: 6 ft 5 in (1.96 m)
- Position: Goalkeeper

Byron Foss (born October 6, 1979, Monarch Beach, California) is an American soccer player who spent the 2004 season playing goalkeeper for the A-League's Syracuse Salty Dogs on loan from the Colorado Rapids of Major League Soccer. He played 21 games. In 2005, Foss started five games at keeper for the Rapids, notching three wins and two draws. His last game was played on Oct 8, 2005.

Foss was undrafted after graduating from Southern Methodist University in 2003, but was signed to the Rapids' developmental roster on March 18, 2003.

Byron Foss joined Grubb & Ellis Commercial Real Estate in 2006. In April 2012, BGC Partners & bought commercial real estate firm, Grubb & Ellis, to form Newmark Grubb Knight Frank. From 2012 to 2017, he became managing director in Newport Beach, California. Foss later became Executive Vice President at JLL (company) until 2020 where he became managing director.

== Awards ==
- 2001 NCAA Division I All American First Team
- 2001 NCAA Division I MVC Defensive Player of the Year
