= Jeremy Field =

Jeremy Field is a Professor of Evolutionary Biology at the University of Exeter. Prior to this, he was a senior lecturer in the Department of Biology at University College London between 1995 and 2007, and Professor of Evolutionary Biology at the University of Sussex from 2007 to 2016.

He completed his BA and PhD at Cambridge University, between 1982 and 1987, and went on to take up postdoctoral positions at various institutions including the University of York and Rice University, Houston, Texas.

His research group specialises in the behavioural and evolutionary ecology of social systems, using eusocial insects as models. The team's current work involves large-scale, long-term projects, running over several years, modelling and micro-satellite based work to investigate gene-relatedness, and assign offspring to parents. The organisms which his team works on most are wasp and bee species Halictus, the hover wasp, and Polistes, the paper wasp. Some papers have been published as a result of these studies, in Nature and Behavioral Ecology. He has also, more recently, been quoted and written about in short articles for the 'Metro' newspaper amongst others, after he named a species of hover wasp "hairy-faced".

He is also an associate editor of the scientific journal 'Behavioral Ecology and Sociobiology'.
