= Mike Nugent (soccer) =

American soccer player

Personal information
- Full name: Mike Nugent
- Date of birth: February 10, 1980 (age 46)
- Place of birth: Boston, Massachusetts, United States
- Height: 5 ft 9 in (1.75 m)
- Position: Striker

Youth career
- Princeton Tigers

Senior career*
Years	Team	Apps	(Gls)
2002	Chicago Fire	4	(0)
2003	MetroStars	1	(0)
Total		5	(0)
- * Club domestic league appearances and goals

Mike Nugent (born February 10, 1980) is an American retired professional soccer player.

== Playing career ==
Nugent was named Ivy League player of the year in 2001 while at Princeton University.

== Statistics ==
Club performance			League		Cup		MLS Playoffs		Continental		Total	
Season	Club	League	Apps	Goals	Apps	Goals	Apps	Goals	Apps	Goals	Apps	Goals
USA			League		Open Cup		MLS Playoffs		North America		Total	
2002	Chicago Fire	MLS	4	0	0	0	0	0	0	0	4	0
2003	MetroStars	MLS	1	0	1	1	1	0	0	0	3	1
Career total			5	0	1	1	1	0	0	0	3	1
