= Monarch Beach, Dana Point, California =

Public beach and neighborhood in Dana Point, California

Coordinates: 33.482°N 117.710°W

Ritz Carlton of Laguna Niguel

Dana point Preserve and Monarch Beach

Monarch Beach is a small neighborhood in Orange County, California, located within the city of Dana Point. It is primarily a residential community. Two luxury resorts, Waldorf Astoria Monarch Beach Resort & Club and the Ritz-Carlton Laguna Niguel, are located within the area. Monarch Beach is close to the city boundary between Dana Point and Laguna Niguel.

== History ==
Monarch Beach is named after its most prominent geological feature, Monarch Bay, aptly named as its rolling hills of sagebrush and manzanita were once a breeding ground for the monarch butterfly. The butterflies were once seen there in large masses, but have disappeared from the area because their habitat has been replaced, almost entirely, by the large houses that can be found in the Monarch Beach neighborhood.

Monarch Beach became a subdivision of the incorporated city of Dana Point on January 1, 1989.

== Culture ==
Monarch Beach has access to Salt Creek Beach and a picnic area. The neighborhood includes the Monarch Beach Resort & Links Course – an 18-hole golf course designed by Robert Trent Jones Jr. It is also the home to the Dana Point Concours d'Elegance automotive charitable event held each year on the Monarch Beach Golf Links.

== Notable people ==
- Marcus Allen
- Fred Roggin
- Nicole Brown Simpson
- O. J. Simpson
