= Mauro Carabajal =

Argentine footballer

Personal information
- Full name: Mauro Ezequiel Carabajal-Lopez
- Date of birth: 7 May 1978 (age 48)
- Place of birth: Rosario, Argentina
- Height: 1.88 m (6 ft 2 in)
- Position: Forward

Youth career
- –1995: Defensores Unidos
- 1995–1997: Rosario Central

Senior career*
| Years | Team | Apps | (Gls) |
| 1997–2000 | Rosario Central | 0 | (0) |
| 1999 | → Vojvodina (loan) | 1 | (0) |
| 2000–2001 | Recreativo de Huelva | | |
| 2001–2002 | Real Huastecos | | |
| 2002–2003 | Jaibos Tampico Madero | | |
| 2003–2004 | San Luis Potosí | | |
| 2004 | West Michigan Edge | 4 | (4) |
| 2004 | Syracuse Salty Dogs | 10 | (9) |
| 2005–2006 | Rochester Raging Rhinos | 18 | (3) |
| 2007 | Deportivo Lempira | | |
- * Club domestic league appearances and goals

Mauro Ezequiel Carabajal-Lopez (born 7 May 1978) is an Argentine retired footballer.

== Career ==
Born in Rosario, he begin playing with Defensores Unidos from where in 1995 moved to CA Rosario Central.

In January 1999, he moved on loan to Serbian club FK Vojvodina together with another Argentine player, Hernán Marcos. The 1998–99 season of the First League of FR Yugoslavia was interrupted by the end of March due to the NATO bombing of FR Yugoslavia. After the players had been told by the club officials that they could begin their holidays earlier, since that season was not going to be played any longer, and was declared finished with the standings found in the time of interruption as definitive, some players, and Carabajal among them, refused to leave, as a show of solidarity. That act is highly regarded by the FK Vojvodina club supporters.

After having played one season for the Spanish Second League club Recreativo Huelva Carabajal moved to Mexico and played with Real Huastecos, Jaibos Tampico Madero and San Luis Potosí. Then, he continued his career in the United States playing with West Michigan Edge. In 2004, he signed with USL A-League side Syracuse Salty Dogs in their last season before being dissolved. In 2005, he moved to USL First Division club Rochester Raging Rhinos. Since 2007, he has played in another American club, the Deportivo Lempira.
