= NBT Bank Stadium =

Baseball stadium in Syracuse, New York

- Historic NBT Bank Stadium

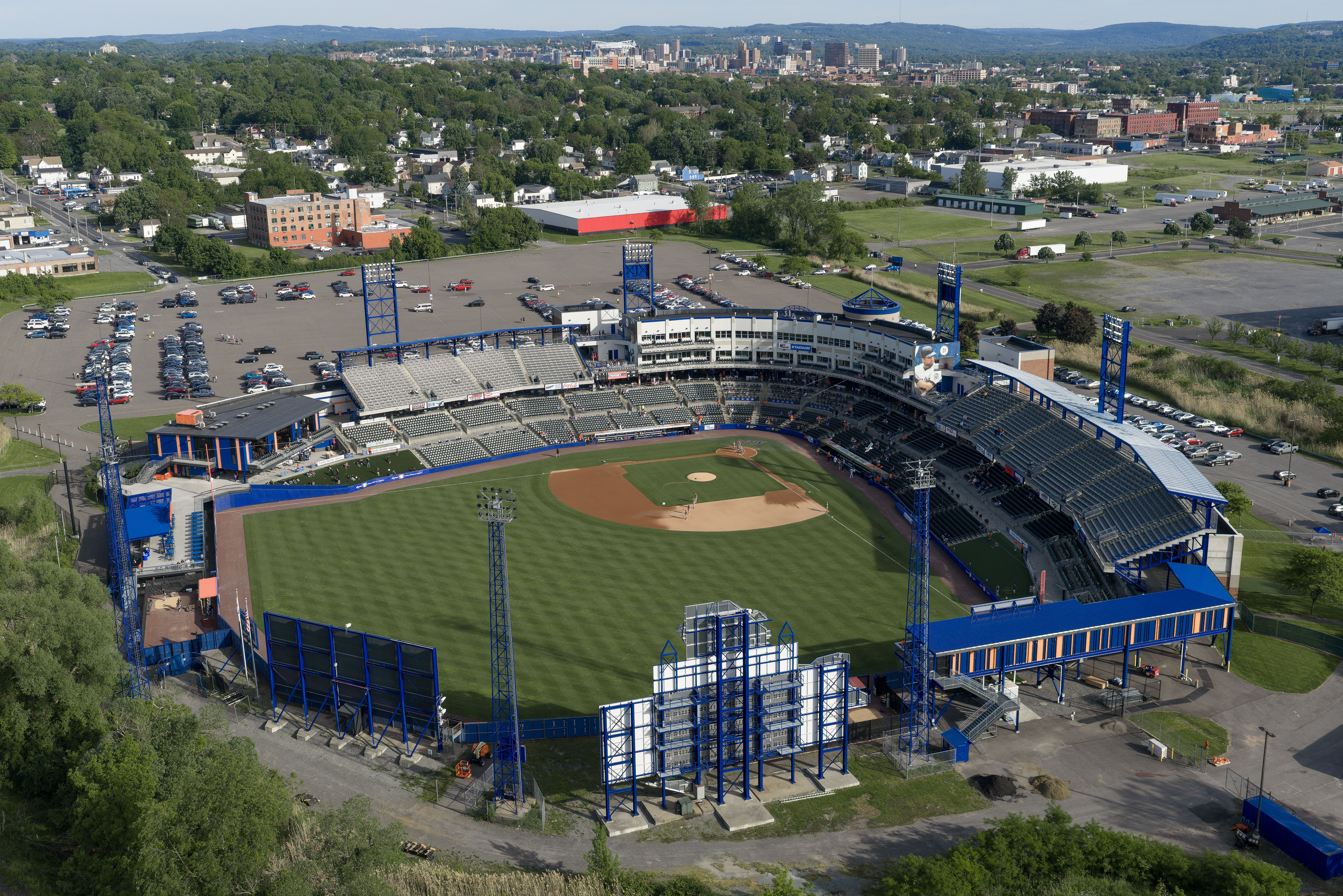
- NBT Bank Stadium in 2026

- Location within New York Location within the United States
- Interactive map of NBT Bank Stadium
- Former names: Alliance Bank Stadium (2005–2013); P&C Stadium (1997–2005)
- Address: 1 Tex Simone Drive; Syracuse, New York
- Coordinates: 43°4′44.68″N 76°9′55.29″W
- Owner: Onondaga County
- Operator: Community Baseball Club of Central New York, Inc. (Syracuse Mets)
- Capacity: 10,815
- Surface: AstroTurf (1997–2007); Grass (2008–present)
- Record attendance: 14,098 (May 7, 2010)
- Field size: Left field: 330 ft (100 m); Center field: 400 ft (120 m); Right field: 330 ft (100 m)
- Public transit: From CENTRO Transit Hub: #16, #116, or #216 N. Salina bus (center platform, Bay B8)

Construction
- Groundbreaking: July 5, 1995
- Opened: April 3, 1997
- Cost: $28 million ($56.2 million in 2025 dollars)
- Architect: Populous
- Structural engineers: Klepper, Hahn & Hyatt
- Services engineers: Burns Brothers, Inc.
- General contractor: J.D. Taylor/Bovis

Tenants
- Syracuse Mets (IL) 1997–present Syracuse Salty Dogs (USL-1) 2003–2004

NBT Bank Stadium is a publicly owned, 10,815-seat, minor league baseball stadium in Syracuse, New York. It is the home stadium for the Syracuse Mets Triple-A baseball team of the International League. The stadium, owned and at times operated by Onondaga County, opened on April 10, 1997, replacing the aging MacArthur Stadium which had served as home to Syracuse's professional baseball teams since 1934 and which was demolished in 1997.

== Syracuse baseball ==
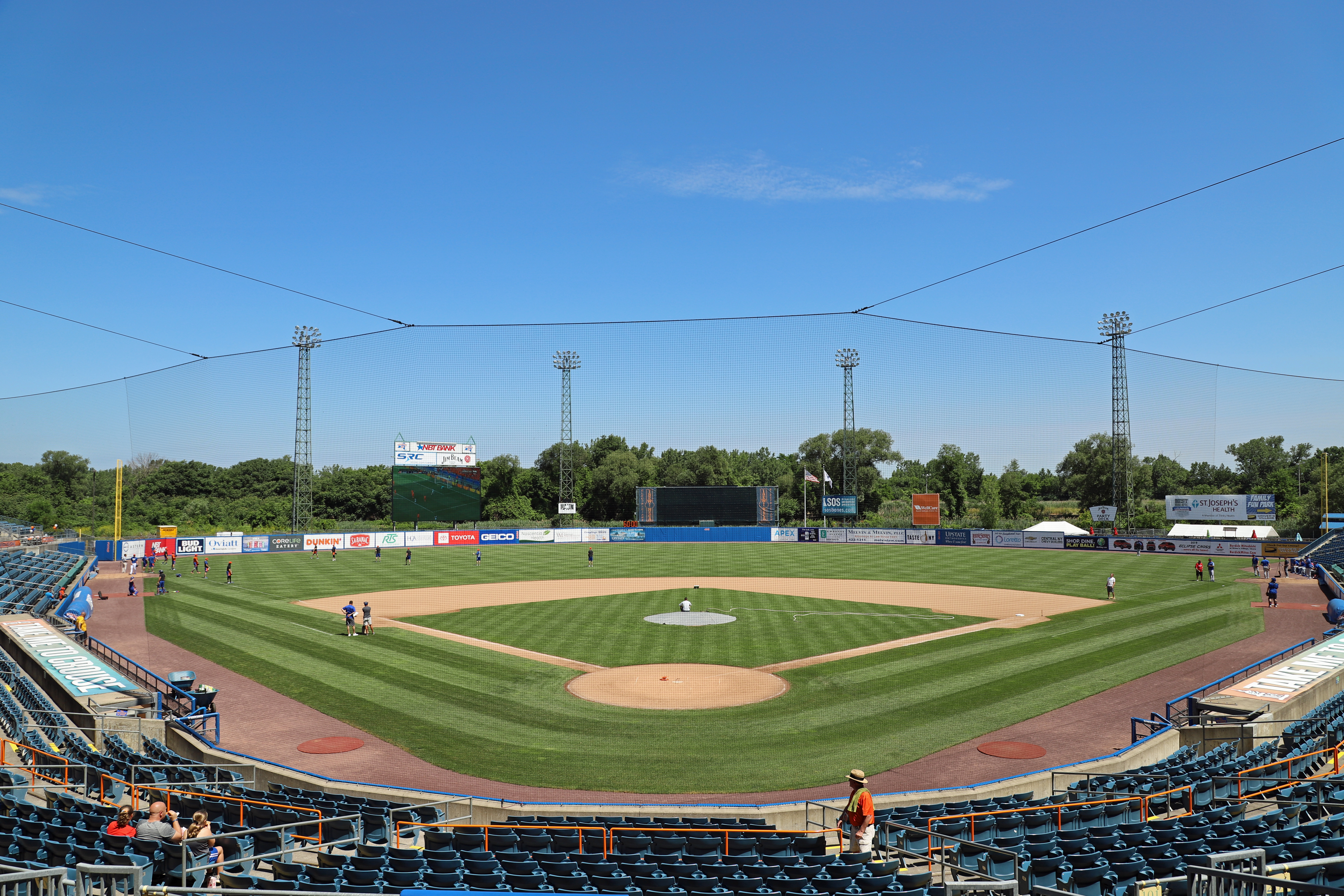
NBT Bank Stadium prior to large-scale renovations, July 2019

The stadium is home to the Syracuse Mets, the Triple-A affiliate of the New York Mets. The field's outfield dimensions are 330 feet (100 m) to left field, 400 feet (120 m) to center field, and 330 feet (100 m) to right field. The stadium has an official seating capacity of 10,815 people. In addition to regular seating, the stadium also offers luxury suites and a banquet room. The luxury suites are available in three different sized configurations and all include indoor and outdoor seating options as well as optional stadium-provided catering. The stadium's banquet room is named after former baseball player Hank Sauer who was with the then Syracuse Chiefs in the 1940s prior to going on to excel in the Major Leagues into the late 1950s and eventually have his number retired by the team. The room is near the right field foul pole and is available to rent year-round.

Seating is broken down into the following: 280 in the 20 luxury suites, 3,000 in the 300 (upper) level, and 7,791 in the lower level.

From its opening through the 2007 season, the stadium's playing surface was AstroTurf, mainly due to the team's then-affiliation with the Toronto Blue Jays who used the artificial surface in their ballpark. However, after the 2007 season, the Astro Turf was removed and replaced with natural grass. It was the last major sports stadium in North America to feature first generation artificial turf.

A record for baseball attendance was set May 7, 2010, when 14,098 people came to the park for Stephen Strasburg's Triple-A debut.

On March 20, 2012, the Syracuse Chiefs announced a new videoboard would be installed by the time the Chiefs took on the Durham Bulls on May 7, 2012. The screen measures 30' X 55' (LED HD display), making it one of the largest video boards in the minor leagues. The stadium's PA system also was upgraded.

On July 2, 2019, a $25 million renovation was approved by Onondaga County lawmakers. A 25-year lease with the Mets was also approved.

On September 14, 2023, the Savannah Bananas sold out the stadium in a Banana Ball match against the Party Animals, which they lost 4-3 in 8 innings (due to the 2 hour max game length rule).

== Other uses ==
=== Soccer ===
The former soccer club Syracuse Salty Dogs of the United Soccer Leagues' A-League also called the stadium home for two seasons. Though they were very popular with fans and had very high attendance, their relationships with the Chiefs and Onondaga County were not positive and the team ceased operations after their second season.

=== Concerts ===
In 2009, the stadium played host to the first two national concerts held at the stadium since 2000 when The Allman Brothers Band played there.

On July 19, 2009, the stadium hosted 7,124 fans who came to see Bob Dylan, Willie Nelson, and John Mellencamp perform.

Two weeks after the Bob Dylan concert, on August 4, Dave Matthews Band was scheduled to perform at the stadium. Stadium management said they used lessons learned during the smaller-scale Dylan show to make the much larger-scale Dave Matthews Band show as smooth as possible. The show drew over 18,000 fans and was considered a great success, possibly paving the way for more concerts at the stadium in the years to come. As of 2024, no further concerts have occurred in the venue.

=== Hockey ===
Following the success of the 2008 and 2009 NHL Winter Classic outdoor hockey games, Syracuse Crunch owner Howard Dolgon started expressing his interest in holding a similar event in Syracuse. Alliance Bank stadium was the logical location to hold such an event since it is the only outdoor professional sports venue in the area. The Crunch estimated the cost of such an event to be between $850,000 and $1.05 million.

That being the case, Dolgon decided to ask the Onondaga County legislature for some financial help in putting on the event. Dolgon argued that since the event was expected to bring many out of town hockey fans to Syracuse, the county could use $350,000 of money set aside "specifically to promote tourism and to attract out-of-town dollars to Syracuse". The money in that fund is collected as a tax on hotel rooms in the county and could be replenished by the people coming in from out-of-town for the hockey game. However, the legislature voted 16-2 to not provide the $350,000 in funding and instead approved a total $75,000 in funding. Prior to the legislature's vote, Dolgon stated publicly that without the $350,000, the game would not go on. After the vote, Dolgon immediately turned the money down, stating:

We're not doing an outdoor game. I'll tell ya, besides disappointing the fans and, of course, our organization, I can tell you about 10–12 prominent companies in Syracuse who are not going to be happy because the idiots who voted the way they did. And I don't mind saying that word. What are they going to do? Get mad at me and vote against something else I want to do?

Eventually, the game was held at the New York State Fairgrounds on Saturday, February 20, 2010, as the Mirabito Outdoor Classic.

However, with new ownership of the stadium, Dolgon would consider holding an outdoor game at NBT Bank Stadium.

=== Scranton/Wilkes-Barre ===
During the 2009 International League Season, the Scranton/Wilkes-Barre RailRiders (then known as the Scranton/Wilkes-Barre Yankees) were forced to postpone 11 games due to drainage problems at their home park, PNC Field. In an effort to allow groundskeepers ample time to repair the field, Scranton/Wilkes-Barre decided to relocate four of their home games. Two of these games, both against the Buffalo Bisons, were moved to Syracuse.

== Economics ==
=== Construction ===
Construction on the stadium was completed in 1997, at a total cost of approximately $28 million.

=== Financing ===
According to The Post-Standard newspaper, financing for stadium construction included:

- $16 million from New York state taxpayers
- $6.6 million from Onondaga County taxpayers
- $4 million from the Syracuse Chiefs/ Community Baseball Club of Central New York, Inc.
- $1 million from the Toronto Blue Jays (which was then the Chiefs' affiliated team)

=== Lease ===
In 2012, the Community Baseball Club of Central New York (Syracuse Chiefs) signed an 11-year lease of the stadium with Onondaga County, starting at $126,000 per year, and increasing two percent per year through 2022, when it would pay $153,576. The Chiefs and County share maintenance, utility and other costs, with the former contributing about $500,000 per year to stadium upkeep.

In its prior, 15-year lease, the Baseball Club paid no rent, but its $4 million contribution to the construction of the stadium was amortized over the term of the lease, in lieu of rent, amounting to about $22,222 per month ($266,664 per year).

The Community Baseball Club had an "option to buy" the stadium from Onondaga County "by the end of 2013", at a price of $3.05 million.

=== Naming rights ===
NBT Bank pays Onondaga County $140,000 per year for stadium naming rights. The 20-year agreement continues through 2025. Jack Webb, executive vice president of NBT Bank and former president of Alliance Bank, serves on the board of directors of the Community Baseball Club of Central New York, Inc., owners of the Syracuse Chiefs and current operator of NBT Bank Stadium.

Previously, the stadium was known as P&C Stadium, derived from P&C Foods, the regional brand of supermarkets run by then Syracuse-based Penn Traffic Corporation (1997–2005); and Alliance Bank Stadium (2005–2013). In 2013, Alliance Bank merged with NBT Bank, which agreed to carry on the naming rights agreement.

=== Video screen ===
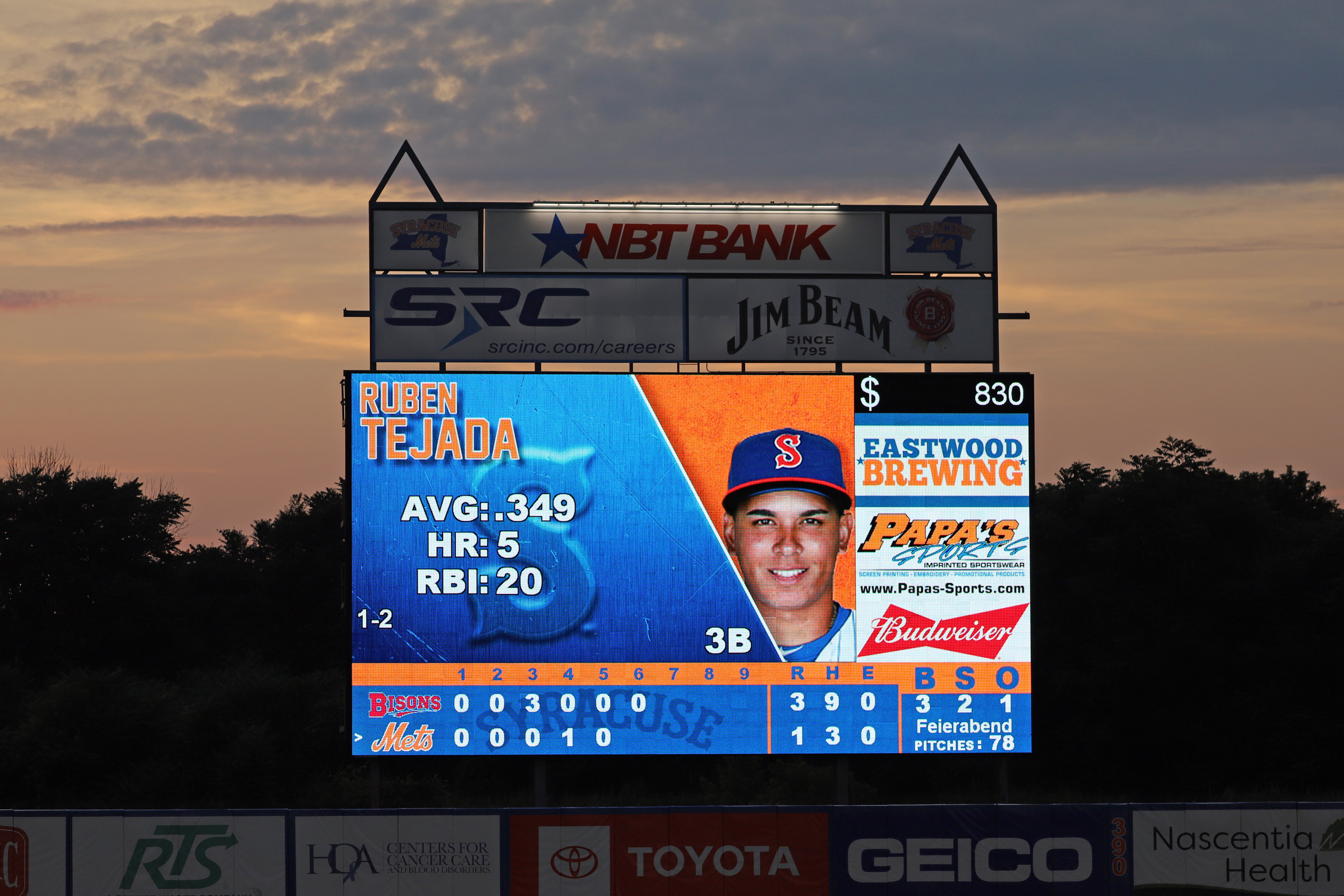
The scoreboard in July 2019

The stadium's HD digital video screen, installed in 2012, was purchased by the Chiefs with a bank loan of $950,000, with Community Baseball Club investments as collateral; and with a County contribution of $200,000. The loan was due January 31, 2014.

=== Renovations ===
In August 2018, the New York Mets and Onondaga County discussed a renovation which could reduce seating capacity by a third while adding a greater array of amenities, with an eye toward extending the team's commitment to NBT Bank Stadium beyond the 2025 season. At the same time, some local officials raised the possibility of constructing a new downtown ballpark.

On July 2, 2019, a $25 million renovation was approved by Onondaga County lawmakers. A 25-year lease with the Mets was also approved. A sign to the left of the main entrance to the stadium state that renovations would begin in Fall 2019.

The renovations were ready for the 2021 season. This includes new seating and also includes exterior painting to match the Mets' color scheme of orange and blue. This new seating includes molded armrests and cupholders. Some seats will be angled to improve the view. However, there will be around 2,000 fewer seats than before, including that some of the seats will be replaced by cafe style-seating. Also, all eight light towers will have new LED lighting. Other improvements include a new bar area atop the left field fence, a renovated Hank Sauer Room (now Metropolitan Club) and an expansion and build-out of the main gate area.

Total seating capacity was decreased from 11,071 to 10,815.

== Gallery ==
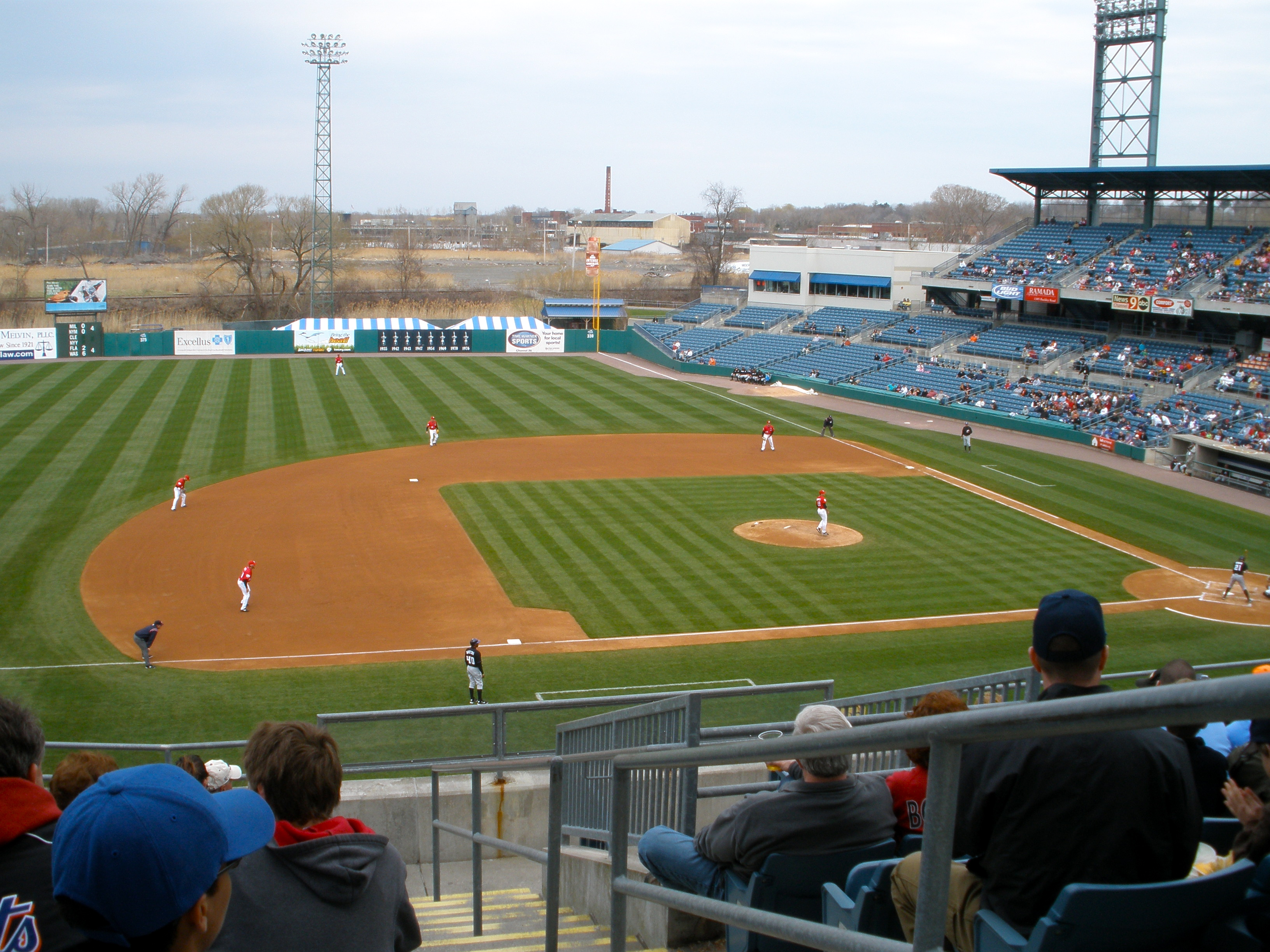
The Syracuse Chiefs playing the field during a game in 2009.

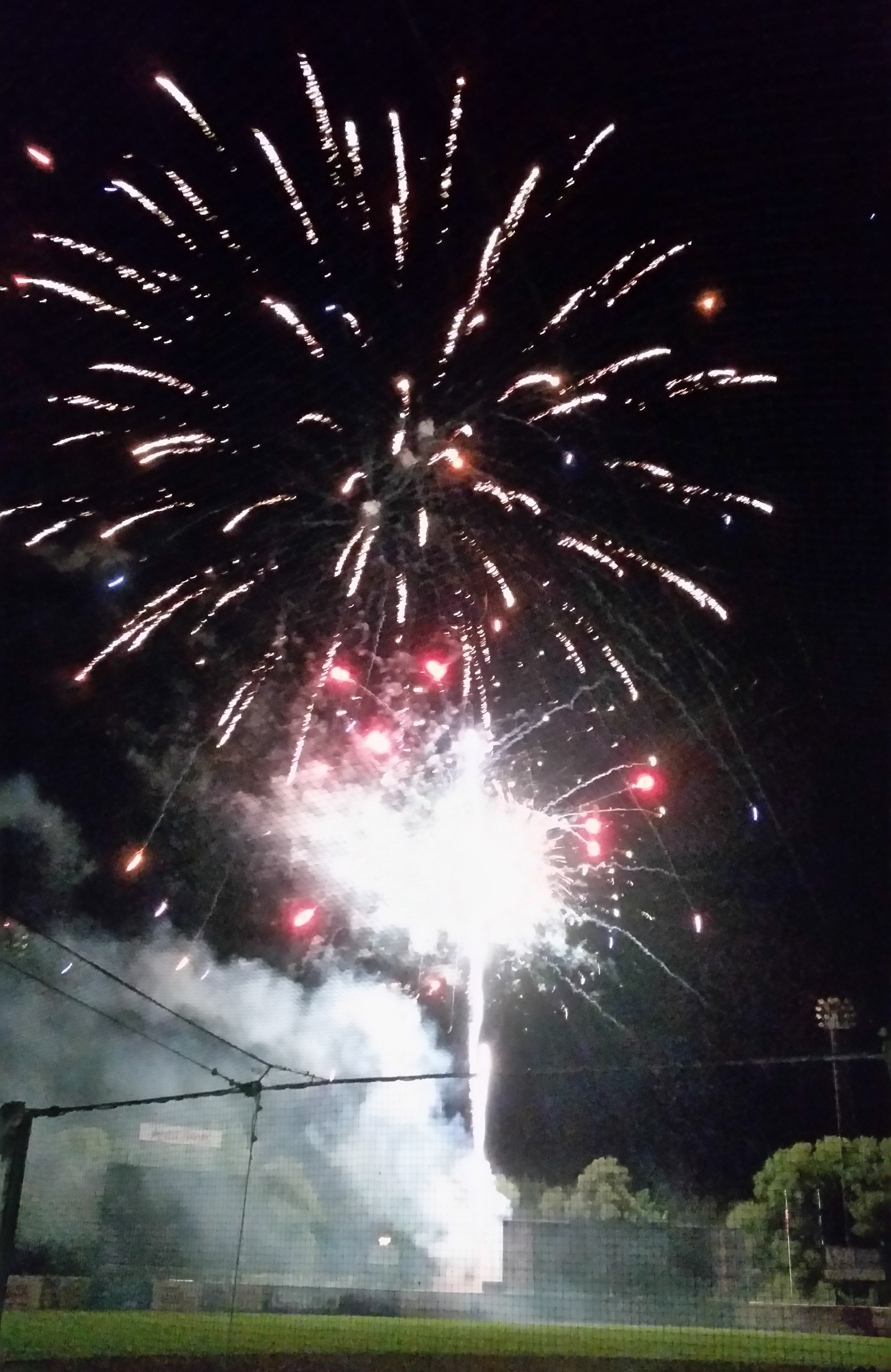
Fireworks, NBT Bank Stadium in 2016.

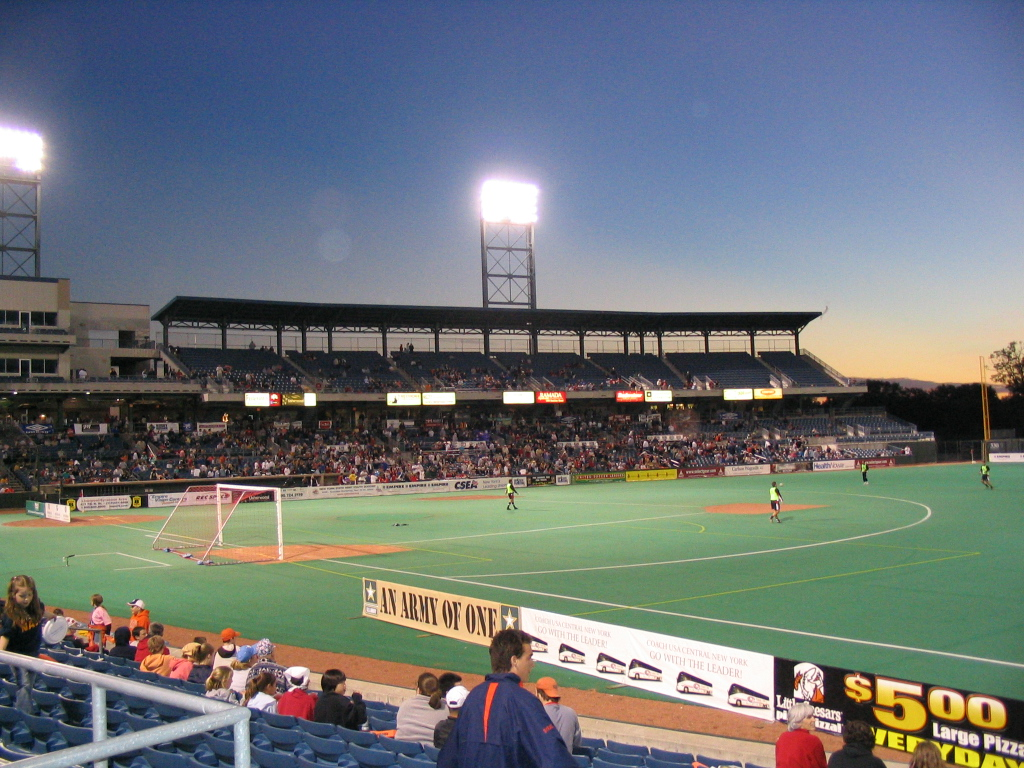
A Syracuse Salty Dogs game at the stadium in 2004.

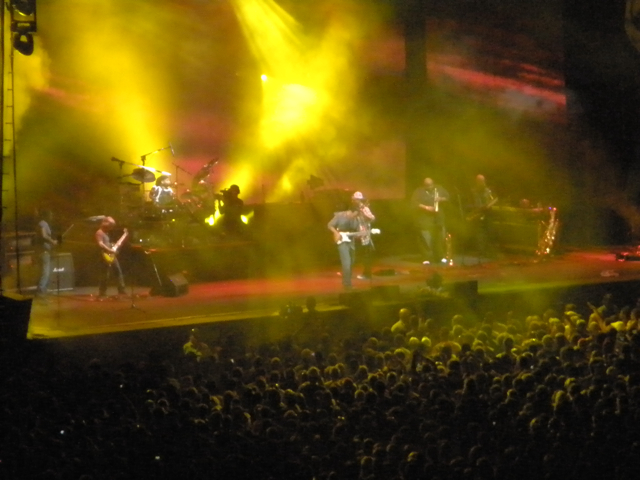
Dave Matthews Band onstage in 2009.

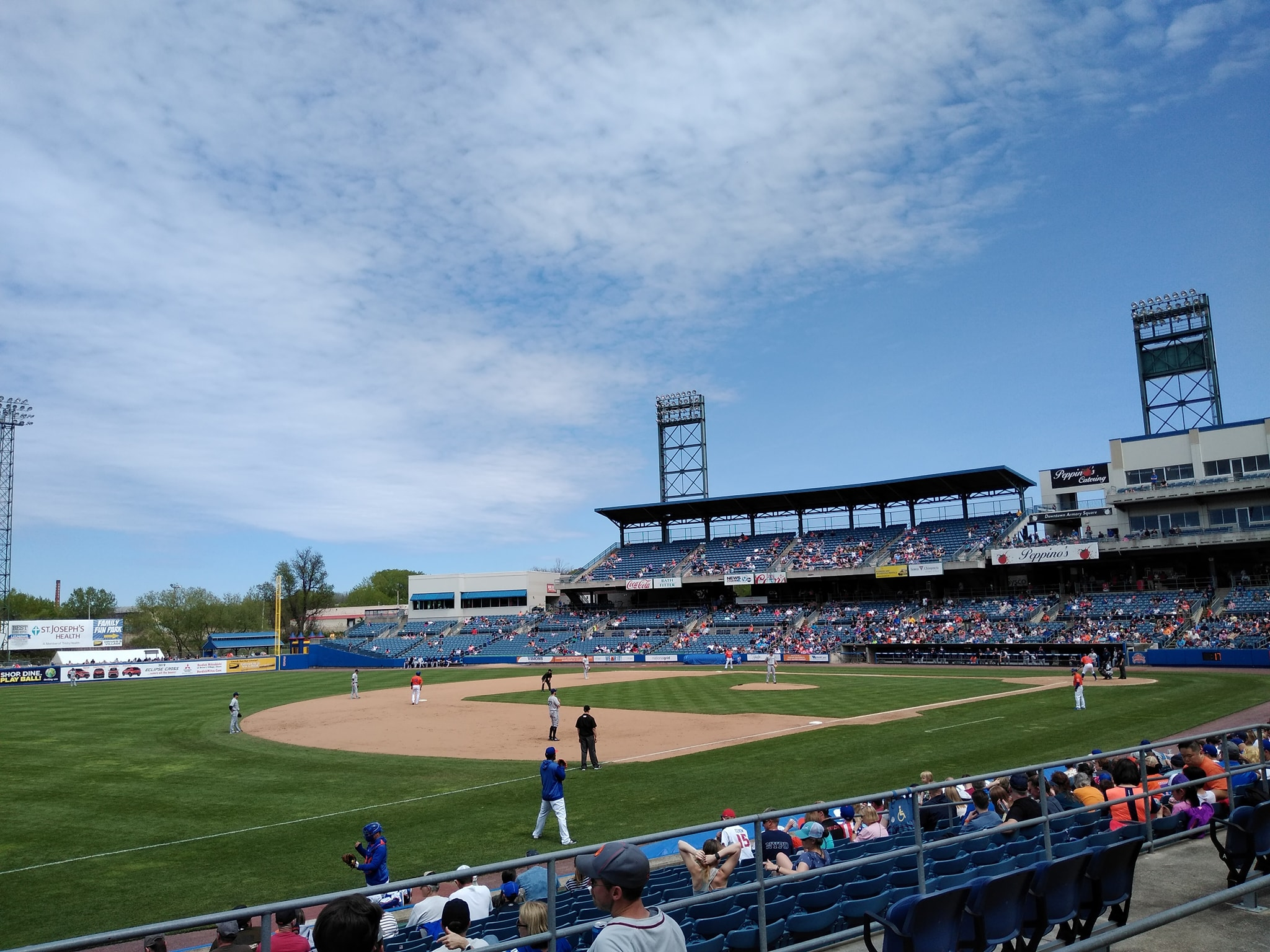
Syracuse Mets vs. Columbus Clippers, May 12, 2019.

Preceded by MacArthur Stadium	Home of the Syracuse Chiefs; 1997 – present	Succeeded by Current
