= Lars Lyssand =

American soccer player

Personal information
- Full name: Lars Robert Lyssand
- Date of birth: December 29, 1979 (age 46)
- Place of birth: Redwood City, California, U.S.
- Height: 6 ft 0 in (1.83 m)
- Positions: Defender; midfielder

Youth career
- 1998–2001: San Jose State Spartans

Senior career*
Years	Team	Apps	(Gls)
2003–2004	Syracuse Salty Dogs	55	(7)
2005–2006	Montreal Impact	53	(2)
2007	Puerto Rico Islanders	15	(0)
Total		123	(9)
- * Club domestic league appearances and goals

Lars Lyssand is an American retired soccer player who played professionally in the USL First Division.

Born to a Norwegian immigrant father and a Swedish immigrant mother, Lyssand grew up in Northern California. He graduated from Woodside High School where he was a three-sport athlete – soccer, football and baseball. Lyssand attended San Jose State University, playing on the men's soccer team from 1998 to 2001, and was the 2001 Mountain Pacific Sports Federation Player of the Year. In February 2002, the San Jose Earthquakes selected Lyssand with the last pick (70th overall) of the 2002 MLS SuperDraft. Although he appeared as a guest player in an August 2002 game against America, Lyssand never played for the Earthquakes during the MLS season. In 2003, he signed with the Syracuse Salty Dogs of the USL A-League. The Salty Dogs ceased operations following the 2004 season. In March 2005, Lyssand signed a two-year contract with the Montreal Impact where he was a two-year starter. In 2007, Lyssand did not report to the Impact, refusing to play for them. On June 14, 2007, the Impact traded Lyssand to the Puerto Rico Islanders in exchange for Alen Marcina. Lyssand finished the season with the Islanders then retired from professional soccer.
