= Peter Luzak =

American soccer player

Personal information
- Date of birth: March 18, 1978 (age 48)
- Place of birth: Media, Pennsylvania, U.S.
- Height: 6 ft 1 in (1.85 m)
- Positions: Midfielder; defender

College career
Years	Team	Apps	(Gls)
1996–1999	Richmond Spiders		

Senior career*
Years	Team	Apps	(Gls)
2000–2005	Richmond Kickers	156	(9)
- * Club domestic league appearances and goals

Peter Luzak is an American retired soccer defender who spent six seasons with the Richmond Kickers in the USL A-League.

In 1996, Luzak graduated from Strath Haven High School where he won the 1995 Pennsylvania Class AAA high school championship. He attended the University of Richmond, playing on the men's soccer team from 1996 to 1999. In February 2000, the Richmond Kickers selected Luzak in the USL A-League draft. Luzak signed with Richmond and spent six seasons with the Kickers. In 2004, he was a First Team All League defender. In 2002 and 2005, the Kickers finished runner up in the league championship game.

In January 2005, a strike by United States men's national soccer team players led to the national coaching staff calling up Luzak and other second division players for an upcoming World Cup qualifier against Trinidad and Tobago. The first team players came to an agreement before the team and Luzak and the other players were released back to their USL teams.

Luzak retired at the end of the 2005 season.
