= Temoc Suarez =

American soccer player-coach

Personal information
- Full name: Cuauhtemoc Suarez
- Date of birth: April 19, 1975 (age 51)
- Place of birth: Mount Pleasant, South Carolina, United States
- Height: 5 ft 7 in (1.70 m)
- Position: Forward

College career
Years	Team	Apps	(Gls)
1993–1996	North Carolina Tar Heels		

Senior career*
Years	Team	Apps	(Gls)
1997–1999	Dallas Burn	56	(3)
1997	→ New Orleans Riverboat Gamblers (loan)	1	(0)
1998	→ New Orleans Riverboat Gamblers (loan)	1	(0)
1999	→ Austin Lone Stars (loan)	1	(0)
1999	→ Atlanta Silverbacks (loan)	4	(3)
2000	Charleston Battery	25	(1)
2000–2002	Cleveland Crunch (indoor)	42	(11)
2001	Connecticut Wolves	23	(7)
2002–2003	Rochester Raging Rhinos	53	(5)
2004	Syracuse Salty Dogs	15	(1)

International career
- United States U17
1999–2000	United States (futsal)	7	(0)
- * Club domestic league appearances and goals

Cuauhtemoc “Temoc” Suarez (born April 19, 1975) is an American former soccer player who spent three seasons in Major League Soccer, two in the National Professional Soccer League and five in the USL First Division. Suarez played for the United States Under-17 national team and also for the national futsal squad.

== Youth ==
Suarez grew up in South Carolina, attending Bishop England High School in Charleston where he was a Parade Magazine high school All American. In 1991, he was selected for the U.S. U-17 national team which qualified for the 1991 FIFA U-17 World Championship. Suarez and his teammates finished 3–0 in group play, but fell in the second round to Qatar in penalty kicks after the two teams played to a 1–1 tie. In 1993, Suarez entered UNC Chapel Hill, where he played on the Tar Heels men's soccer team from 1993 to 1996. Suarez was the 1993 Atlantic Coast Conference Rookie of the Year and a 1994 second team All American. He finished his four years at UNC with 47 career goals.

== Professional ==
In 1997, Long Island Rough Riders of the second division USISL selected Suarez in the first round (third overall) of the USISL Territorial Draft. However, the Dallas Burn of first division Major League Soccer also chose Suarez in the first round (sixth overall) of the 1997 College Draft. Suarez signed with the Burn, spending three seasons with them. While with the Burn, Suarez went on loan several times to teams in the USISL. The Burn released following the 1999 season.

In 2000, he joined his hometown club Charleston Battery of the USL A-League for one season. That fall, he moved indoors with the Cleveland Crunch of the National Professional Soccer League (NPSL). In 2001, the NPSL was renamed the Major Indoor Soccer League. He would play two season with the Crunch until it folded and became the Force in 2002. In August 2002, the Milwaukee Wave selected Suarez the first round (ninth overall) in the MISL dispersal draft, but he chose to concentrate on his outdoor career. In 2001, Suarez left the Battery and joined the Connecticut Wolves for one season. He then moved to the Rochester Raging Rhinos for the 2002 and 2003 seasons and the Syracuse Salty Dogs in 2004. He retired from playing professionally following the 2004 season.

== Futsal ==
Suarez earned seven caps with the United States national futsal team between 1999 and 2000 as the team prepared for the FIFA Futsal World Cup. However, the U.S. failed to qualify.

== Coaching ==
Following his retirement Suarez entered the field of youth coaching in his hometown of Charleston, founding Suarez Soccer School, a series of clinics focused on technical training for beginner-level players. In 2010, Suarez was named boys varsity soccer coach at Pinewood Preparatory School in Summerville, South Carolina. Suarez also serves as director of the Charleston Battery's youth summer camps.
