= Frank Sanfilippo =

American soccer player (born 1981)

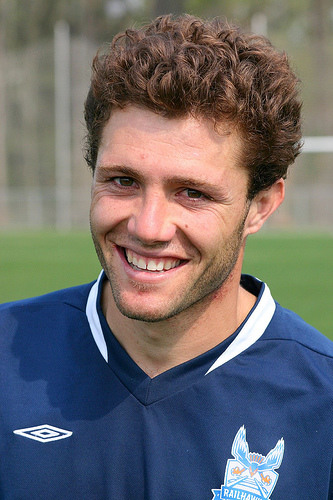

Personal information
- Full name: Francisco Sanfilippo
- Date of birth: September 8, 1981 (age 45)
- Place of birth: San Diego, California, United States
- Height: 5 ft 9 in (1.75 m)
- Position: Defender

College career
Years	Team	Apps	(Gls)
2000–2003	San Jose State Spartans	79	(7)

Senior career*
Years	Team	Apps	(Gls)
2004	Syracuse Salty Dogs	25	(0)
2005–2006	Rochester Raging Rhinos	53	(1)
2007–2008	Carolina RailHawks	51	(1)
2009	Charleston Battery	29	(2)
2010	Rochester Rhinos	28	(1)
2011–2014	Tampa Bay Rowdies	103	(4)
2015	Fort Lauderdale Strikers	30	(1)
2015–2016	Tampa Bay Rowdies	2	(0)

Managerial career
- 2021–: San Diego Toreros (assistant)
- * Club domestic league appearances and goals as of 16 April 2022

Francisco Sanfilippo (born September 8, 1981) is an American former soccer player who is currently an assistant coach for the University of San Diego.

== Career ==
=== College ===
Sanfilippo was born in San Diego, California. After graduating from University High School in 1999, he attended San José State University where he was a member of the men's soccer team from 1999 to 2003.

In February 2003, the San Jose Earthquakes selected Sanfilippo in the 6th round (56th overall) of the 2003 MLS SuperDraft. He did not sign with the Earthquakes, but remained in school to finish his degree in sociology.

=== Professional ===
Sanfilippo signed with Syracuse Salty Dogs in the USL First Division in 2004. The Dogs folded at the end of the 2004 season, and he moved to the Rochester Rhinos in 2005. When Rhinos defender Scott Schweitzer retired at the beginning of the 2006 season, it was Sanfilippo that Rhinos' coach Laurie Calloway called upon to be a steadying force in the Rhinos defense and mentor a young Rhinos backline, which had been devastated from the previous years' retirements, transfers, and injuries. He was equal to the task and helped lead the Rhinos to the USL Championship match. Sanfilippo was named to the 2006 USL-1 All-Star team.

In 2007, he moved to the expansion Carolina RailHawks where he played two seasons, both as team captain. On 20 January 2009, he signed with the Charleston Battery.

Sanfilippo rejoined Rochester Rhinos in February 2010. After one season with the Rhinos, he signed with FC Tampa Bay of the North American Soccer League on February 8, 2011, on a one-year contract with a club option for 2012.

After a successful 2011 season with Tampa Bay, the club exercised its 2012 option on Sanfilippo's contract on October 4, 2011. Two months later, the club signed Sanfilippo to a new contract through the 2014 season.

Sanfilippo spent the 2015 season in South Florida with the Fort Lauderdale Strikers before returning to Tampa Bay on December 21, 2015.

== Honors ==
=== Tampa Bay Rowdies ===
- North American Soccer League:
  - Champion 2012

=== Rochester Rhinos ===
- USSF Division 2 Pro League Regular Season Champions: 2010
