= Syracuse Salty Dogs =

Syracuse Football Club
- Full name: Syracuse Football Club
- Nickname: Salty Dogs
- Founded: 2003
- Dissolved: 2004
- Stadium: P&C Stadium; Syracuse, New York
- Capacity: 12,000
- Owner(s): Syracuse Pro Sports Group
- President: (United States) Tim Kuhl
- Coach: (England) Laurie Calloway
- League: USL A-League
Home colors	Away colors

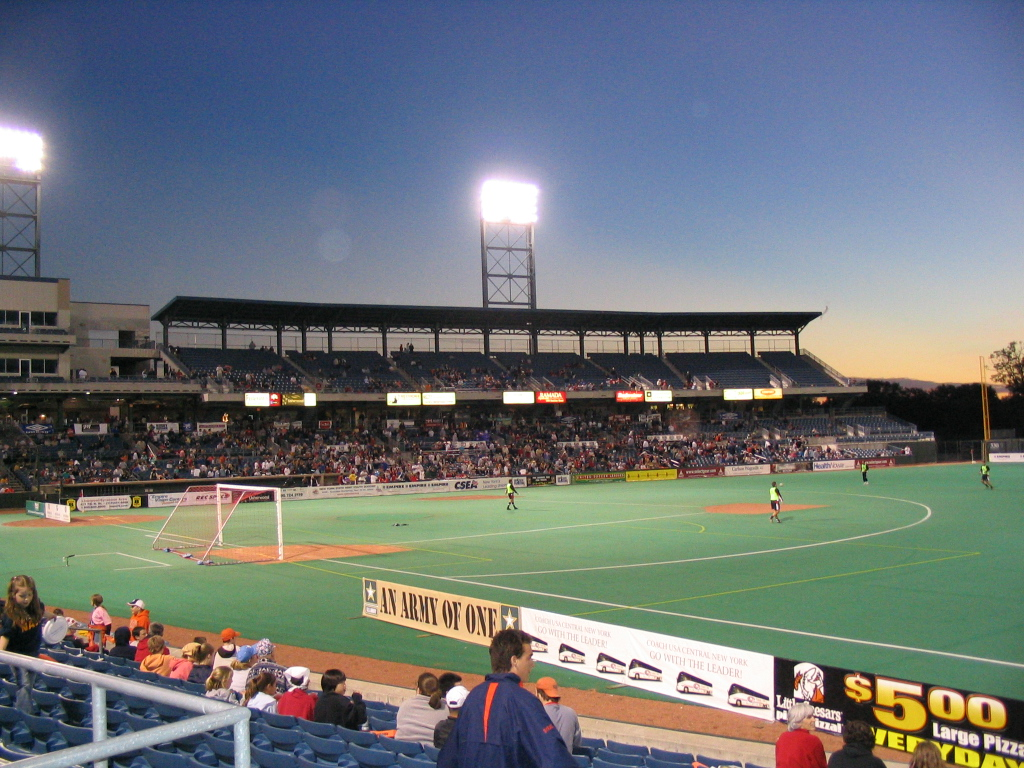
The Syracuse Salty Dogs vs. the Atlanta Silverbacks in 2004 at Alliance Bank Stadium in Syracuse, NY

The Syracuse Salty Dogs (formally Syracuse Football Club) were a professional men's soccer team based in Syracuse, New York. The name of the club originates from "Salty Dog" which is nautical slang for an experienced sailor who has spent much of his life aboard a ship at sea and thus generally given increased credibility by ship mates in matters pertaining to ship-board life and duties. The club was a member of the USL A-League, playing only two seasons from 2003–2004. The club was owned and operated by the Syracuse Pro Sports Group and played most home games at P&C Stadium. The team suspended operations in October 2004 due to financial difficulties and has not played since. However, groups have been working to return pro soccer to Syracuse.

== History ==
The Salty Dogs debuted in their first season in 2003, where they ended with a record of 11–12–5 (W–L–D) under coach Laurie Calloway. The club improved their record to 15–8–5 in their second season and averaged the third highest attendance in the A-League during both years of play.

=== Financial difficulties & dissolution ===
Despite high attendance in the A-League over both years of play and reasonable success on the field, the team faltered financially. The club's budget had been strained as a result of using P&C Stadium (now known as NBT Bank Stadium), which is run by the SkyChiefs. During their first season, the team was forced to play several home games at the Liverpool Athletic Complex at Liverpool High School, which was primarily a football field in Liverpool, NY (also shared by the CNY Express, an amateur American football team). During its second season, the team's playoff home games were in Cortland, NY for similar reasons.

During the 2004 season, there were proposals to build a downtown soccer stadium near Armory Square. After the team's folding, Matt Driscoll, Syracuse's mayor, stated that realization of such a stadium is only feasible if a team returns. The Syracuse Pro Sports group filed for bankruptcy and folded the team in October 2004.

=== Future soccer expansion in Syracuse ===
The Syracuse-based Monolith Athletic Club had been working to return professional soccer to Syracuse. After over a year of negotiations, the group has cleared two out of the four hurdles necessary to bring USL soccer back to Syracuse. The second hurdle, seen as the pivotal one, involving the Chiefs baseball team, was cleared in April 2006. The final two steps involved a settlement on territorial rights with the Rochester Raging Rhinos and expansion approval from the USL.

In September 2007, Matt Michael of the Syracuse Post-Standard reported that Monolith Athletic Club owner, Vito William Lucchetti, was no longer involved with bringing pro soccer to Syracuse, citing his intent to focus on his other business dealings.

Professional soccer did return to Syracuse in 2011 when the expansion Syracuse Silver Knights began play in the Major Indoor Soccer League.

== Players ==
=== 2004 Roster ===
Salty Dogs roster for their final 2004 season.

Note: Flags indicate national team as defined under FIFA eligibility rules; some limited exceptions apply. Players may hold more than one non-FIFA nationality.

No.	Pos.	Nation	Player
1	GK	USA	Byron Foss
28	GK	USA	Paul Nagy
2	DF	USA	Timothy O'Neill
3	DF	USA	Scott Schweitzer
4	DF	USA	Kupono Low
5	MF	USA	Ryan Mack
6	DF	USA	Jason Perry
7	MF	USA	Lars Lyssand
8	MF	USA	Tommy Tanner
9	MF	ENG	Matthew Barnes-Homer
10	FW	HUN	Cjaba Kerekes
11	FW	USA	Anthony Maher
12	DF	USA	Mike Kirmse
12	DF	USA	David Lara
13	DF	USA	Ryan Hall

No.	Pos.	Nation	Player
14	MF	USA	Temoc Suarez
15	MF	USA	Frank Sanfilippo
16	FW	JAM	Machel Millwood
16	MF		Nuno Almeida
17	DF	ROU	Christian Neagu
17	FW	ARG	Mauro Carabajal
18	MF	ENG	Ian Woan
19	MF	USA	Christopher Dore
20	MF		Paul Buckley
22	FW	NIR	Jonny Steele
24	DF		Chris Fehrle
25	DF	SUR	Benito Kemble
25	FW	HUN	Attila Vendegh
26	MF	BRA	Rene Rivas

== Coach ==
- (England) Laurie Calloway 2003–2004

== Year-by-year ==
Year	League	Reg. season	Playoffs	Open Cup	Record	Avg. attendance
2003	USL A-League	4th, Northeast	Did not qualify	Did not qualify	11–12–5 (W-L-D)	6,885
2004	USL A-League	3rd, Eastern	Semifinals	3rd Round	15–8–5	6,387

== Player statistics ==
2003

Player	Goals	Assists	Points
Gabriel Valencia	10	1	21
Machel Millwood	6	2	14
Lars Lyssand	4	3	11
Rene Rivas	4	0	8
Mike Kirmse	3	2	8
Noah Delgado	1	5	7
Ryan Mack	2	2	6
Jack Jewsbury	2	0	4
Neil McNab	2	0	4
Tommy Tanner	2	0	4
Ryan Hall	1	2	4
Ian Woan	1	2	4
Adauto Neto	1	1	3
Isiais Bardales	1	0	2
Anthony Medina	0	2	2
Paul Nagy	0	1	1

2004

Player	Goals	Assists	Points
Mauro Carabajal	9	1	19
Machel Millwood	6	4	16
Rene Rivas	6	2	14
Anthony Maher	6	1	13
Christopher Dore	3	6	12
Atilla Vendegh	3	3	9
Ian Woan	2	4	8
Lars Lyssand	3	1	7
Timothy O'Neil	1	2	4
Jonathon Steele	1	2	4
Matthew Barnes-Homer	1	0	2
Cjaba Kerekes	1	0	2
Christian Neagu	1	0	2
Cuauhtemoc Suarez	1	0	2
Kupono Low	0	1	1
Ryan Mack	0	1	1
Jason Perry	0	1	1

== See also ==
- Rochester Rhinos
- New York Red Bulls
