= René Rivas =

Brazilian footballer (born 1968)

Personal information
- Full name: René Luís Vilela Squella Rivas
- Date of birth: 18 October 1968 (age 58)
- Place of birth: Rio de Janeiro, Brazil
- Height: 1.86 m (6 ft 1 in)
- Positions: Defender; midfielder

Senior career*
Years	Team	Apps	(Gls)
1992	Botafogo	19	(3)
1993–1995	Campomaiorense	24	(2)
1996–1997	Rochester Rhinos	32	(2)
1997–2000	Campomaiorense	47	(8)
2000	Santa Clara	9	(0)
2000–2001	Leça	30	(1)
2001–2002	Vila Real		
2002–2003	Imortal DC		
2003–2004	Syracuse Salty Dogs	42	(10)
2005	Rochester Rhinos	17	(3)
- * Club domestic league appearances and goals

René Luís Vilela Squella Rivas (born 18 October 1968), or Rene Playboy is a Brazilian former professional footballer who spent his career in the United States and Portuguese lower divisions.

In 1993, Rivas joined S.C. Campomaiorense in Portugal. After two seasons, he moved to the United States and signed with the Rochester Raging Rhinos of the A-League. He was 1996 First Team All A-League. During the 1997 season, he left the Rhinos and signed with S.C. Campomaiorense. He began the 1999–2000 season with Compaomaiorense, but moved to Santa Clara during the winter transfer window. He then moved to Leça F.C. for the 2000–01 season, Vila Real for the 2001–02 season and Imortal Desportivo Clube for the 2002–03 season. In July 2003, Rivas went on loan to the Syracuse Salty Dogs of the A-League. Imortal then sold his contract to Syracuse and Rivas remained with the Salty Dogs through the 2004 season. In 2005, Rivas returned to the Rhinos. He retired at the end of the season.
