= Timothy O'Neill (soccer) =

American soccer player

Tim O'Neill
Personal information
- Full name: Timothy O'Neill
- Date of birth: February 17, 1982 (age 44)
- Place of birth: Philadelphia, Pennsylvania, U.S.
- Height: 5 ft 8 in (1.73 m)
- Position: Midfielder

Youth career
- 2000: Rider Broncs
- 2001–2003: St. John's Red Storm

Senior career*
Years	Team	Apps	(Gls)
2003	South Jersey Barons	15	(1)
2004	Syracuse Salty Dogs	28	(1)
2005–2006	Virginia Beach Mariners	49	(1)
2005–2006	Philadelphia KiXX (indoor)		
2007–2009	New Jersey Ironmen (indoor)		
- * Club domestic league appearances and goals

Timothy O'Neill (born February 17, 1982) is an American soccer midfielder who played professionally in the USL First Division.

O'Neill graduated from Northeast Catholic High School in Philadelphia, Pennsylvania. He was a 1999 All State High School soccer player at Northeast. In 2000, he began college at Rider University where he led the team in scoring. He transferred to St. John's University, playing on the men's soccer team from 2001 to 2004. In 2003, they were beaten by the Indiana Hoosiers in the final of the 2003 NCAA Division I Men's Soccer Championship. During the 2003 college off-season, O'Neill played for the South Jersey Barons of the USL Premier Development League.

In 2004, he turned professional with the Syracuse Salty Dogs of the USL A-League. That season, the Salty Dogs reached the A-League Eastern Conference final but folded during the off-season. In 2005, he moved to the Virginia Beach Mariners. That season, he made 27 appearances for the Mariners, scoring one goal. He continued with the Mariners in 2006, playing 22 more games.

In October 2005, O'Neill attended an open tryout with the Philadelphia KiXX of the Major Indoor Soccer League. The KiXX offered him a contract and he joined the team in November. In February 2006, the Mariners recalled O'Neill to the team for pre-season workouts, ending his time with the KiXX. In fall 2007, he joined the expansion New Jersey Ironmen Major Indoor Soccer League. He played for the Ironmen in the 2008 playoffs, but did not begin the 2008–2009 season with them. In March 2009, he signed with the Ironmen, now playing in the Xtreme Soccer League, for the rest of the season.
