= Dustin Branan =

American soccer player (born 1981)

Personal information
- Full name: Dustin Branan
- Date of birth: May 21, 1981 (age 45)
- Place of birth: Atlanta, Georgia, U.S.
- Height: 6 ft 3 in (1.91 m)
- Position: Defender

Youth career
- 1999–2002: Brown University

Senior career*
Years	Team	Apps	(Gls)
2003–2004	Minnesota Thunder	41	(2)
2005	Kansas City Wizards	1	(0)
2006	Minnesota Thunder	26	(2)
- * Club domestic league appearances and goals as of December 22, 2006

Dustin Branan (born May 21, 1981), is an American retired soccer defender who played for the Kansas City Wizards of Major Soccer League and the Minnesota Thunder of the USL First Division.

Branan attended Lakeville High School where he was a 1998 first team All State soccer player. He played college soccer at Brown, from 1999 to 2002, where he started 58 games, and was twice named first-team All-Ivy. Upon graduating, he was drafted by the Minnesota Thunder of the A-League and, despite joining the team midseason because of college commitments, was named the club's Rookie of the Year in 2003. The next year, Branan anchored the Thunder's formidable defense, and was a finalist for the A-League Defender of the Year Award.

Following his 2004 season, Branan signed with the Kansas City Wizards of MLS as a developmental player in early 2005. He was released by the Wizards at the end of the season and returned to the Minnesota Thunder.
