= Billy Sleeth =

American soccer player (born 1979)

Personal information
- Full name: William Charles Sleeth
- Date of birth: October 23, 1979 (age 47)
- Place of birth: Spokane, Washington, United States
- Height: 6 ft 0 in (1.83 m)
- Position: Defender

Youth career
- 1998–2001: Washington Huskies

Senior career*
Years	Team	Apps	(Gls)
1999	Spokane Shadow		
2000–2001	Seattle Sounders Select		
2002	Chicago Fire	13	(0)
2003	Colorado Rapids	0	(0)
2004–2005	Seattle Sounders	35	(0)
- * Club domestic league appearances and goals

William Charles Sleeth (born October 23, 1979) is a former American soccer player.
