= List of Richmond Kickers seasons =

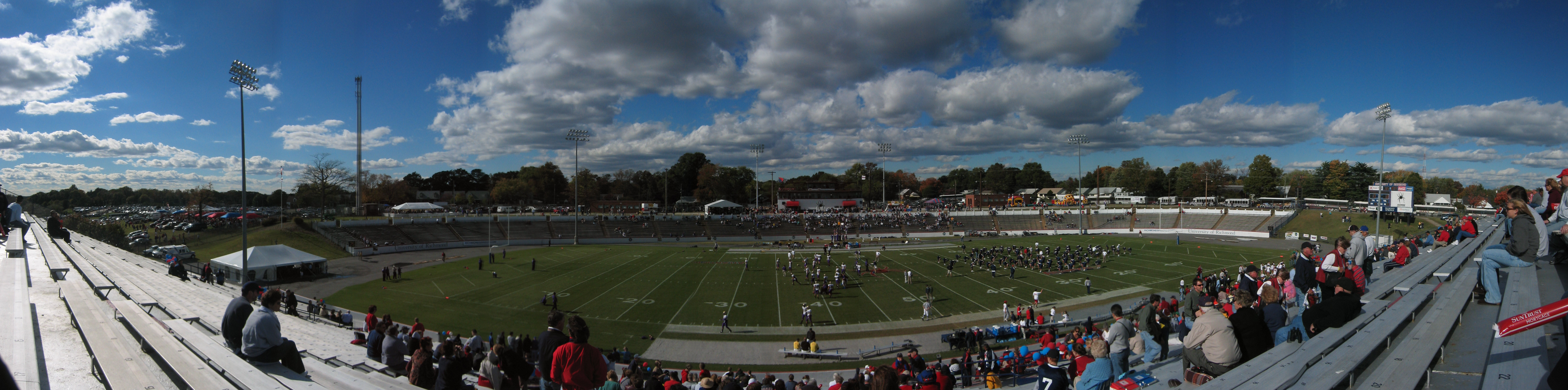
The Kickers play at City Stadium in Richmond, Virginia, and has played in the stadium its entire existence. The stadium is pictured in 2007.

The Richmond Kickers are an American professional soccer club based in Richmond, Virginia that compete in the USL Professional Division (USL Pro), the third division in the United States. Founded in 1993, the club has had several spells in the second, third and fourth tiers of American soccer. Since 2006, the club has played in whichever league has represented the third division in American soccer.

The Kickers have reached eight league championships in their existence, winning three total; two in the third division and one in the fourth division. In 2005, the Kickers lost to the Seattle Sounders in the USL First Division championship, to determine the second division champion that season, making it the strongest season performance in club history. The Kickers have won the U.S. Open Cup once in their history, winning the 1995 edition of the tournament. Their next best Open Cup performance was in 2011, when the Kickers reached the semifinals of the tournament, defeating two MLS sides in the process.

The following is a list of each season completed by the Kickers, inclusive of all competitive competitions.

== Key ==
Key to competitions

- USL League One (USL L1) – The third division of soccer in the United States, established in 2019.
- USL Championship (USLC) – The second division of soccer in the United States, established in 2010 and previously known as USL and USL Pro. The Championship was the third division of American soccer from its founding until its elevation to second division status in 2017.
- USL First Division (USL-1) – The second division of soccer in the United States from 2005 through 2009.
- USL Second Division (USL-2) – The third division of soccer in the United States from 2005 through 2009.
- A-League – The second division of soccer in the United States from 1995 through 2004, now defunct.
- American Professional Soccer League (APSL) – The second division of soccer in the United States from 1990 through 1996, now defunct.
- USL Select League (USISL) – The third division of soccer in the United States from 1989 through 1997, now defunct.
- U.S. Open Cup (USOC) – The premier knockout cup competition in US soccer, first contested in 1914.
- CONCACAF Champions League (CCL) – The premier competition in North American soccer since 1962. It went by the name of Champions' Cup until 2008.

Key to colors and symbols

1st or W	Winners
2nd or RU	Runners-up
Last	Wooden Spoon
♦	Golden Boot
	Highest average attendance

Key to league record

- Season = The year and article of the season
- Div = Level on pyramid
- League = League name
- Pld = Played
- W = Games won
- L = Games lost
- D = Games drawn
- GF = Goals scored
- GA = Goals against
- Pts = Points
- PPG = Points per game
- Conf = Conference position
- Overall = League position

Key to cup record

- DNE = Did not enter
- DNQ = Did not qualify
- NH = Competition not held or canceled
- QR = Qualifying round
- PR = Preliminary round
- GS = Group stage
- R1 = First round
- R2 = Second round
- R3 = Third round
- R4 = Fourth round
- R5 = Fifth round
- QF = Quarterfinals
- SF = Semifinals
- RU = Runners-up
- W = Winners

== Seasons ==
Season	League											Position		Playoffs	USOC	Continental / Other		Average attendance	Top goalscorer(s)	
Season	Div	League	Pld	W	L	D	GF	GA	GD	Pts	PPG	Conf.	Overall	Playoffs	USOC	Continental / Other		Average attendance	Name	Goals
1993	3	USISL	16	8	8	0	30	30	0	24	1.50	4th	22nd	R2	DNE	Ineligible		2,433	N/A	N/A
1994	3	USISL	18	4	14	0	21	43	–22	12	0.67	9th	60th	DNQ	DNE	Ineligible		985	N/A	N/A
1995	4	USISL PL	18	15	3	0	47	21	+26	45	2.50	2nd	3rd	W	W	Ineligible		1,109	(United States) Rob Ukrop	10
1996	2	USISL SL	18	10	8	0	34	24	+10	30	1.67	2nd	9th	RU	DNQ	CONCACAF Cup Winners Cup	NH	1,255	(United States) Ben McKnight	9
1997	2	A-League	28	15	13	0	41	35	+6	45	1.61	3rd	8th	R1	Ro16	Ineligible		1,925	(United States) Rob Ukrop	13
1998	2	A-League	28	21	7	0	48	22	+26	63	2.25	2nd	3rd	QF	DNQ	Ineligible		2,527	(Ukraine) Ihor Dotsenko	11
1999	2	A-League	28	17	11	0	51	44	+7	51	1.82	6th	11th	R1	DNQ	Ineligible		2,488	(Jamaica) Onandi Lowe	15
2000	2	A-League	28	20	7	1	42	25	+17	61	2.18	2nd	5th	QF	Ro16	Ineligible		2,192	(Canada) Dwayne De Rosario	15
2001	2	A-League	26	16	7	3	47	34	+13	51	1.96	1st	1st	QF	QF	Ineligible		2,436	(Trinidad and Tobago) Kevin Jeffrey	15
2002	2	A-League	28	13	9	6	44	37	+7	45	1.61	4th	7th	RU	Ro16	Ineligible		2,431	(United States) Josh Henderson	16
2003	2	A-League	28	12	9	7	41	32	+9	43	1.54	6th	11th	DNQ	DNQ	Ineligible		2,273	(Trinidad and Tobago) Kevin Jeffrey	10
2004	2	A-League	28	17	8	3	44	29	+15	54	1.93	2nd	3rd	QF	QF	Ineligible		2,333	(Liberia) McColm Cephas	12
2005	2	USL-1	28	10	9	9	28	30	–2	39	1.39	N/A	6th	RU	Ro16	Ineligible		2,754	(England) Matthew Delicâte	8
2006	3	USL-2	20	13	3	4	50	20	+30	43	2.15	N/A	1st	W	R2	Ineligible		2,341	(Uganda) Robert Ssejjemba	17
2007	3	USL-2	20	12	3	5	37	15	+22	41	2.05	N/A	1st	RU	QF	Ineligible		2,594	(United States) Ricky Schramm	6
2008	3	USL-2	20	14	4	2	48	20	+28	44	2.20	N/A	2nd	SF	Ro16	Ineligible		2,519	(United States) David Bulow	11
2009	3	USL-2	20	11	3	6	39	18	+21	39	1.95	N/A	2nd	W	R1	DNQ		2,874	(England) Matthew Delicâte	11
2010	3	USL-2	20	9	5	6	25	20	+5	33	1.65	N/A	2nd	RU	Ro16	DNQ		2,044	(England) Matthew Delicâte	11
2011	3	USL Pro	24	12	7	5	35	21	+14	41	1.71	3rd	3rd	SF	SF	DNQ		2,545	(England) Matthew Delicâte	13
2012	3	USL Pro	24	11	8	5	31	27	+4	38	1.58	N/A	4th	R1	R3	DNQ		2,433	(United States) Chris Agorsor	8
2013	3	USL Pro	26	15	1	10	51	24	+27	55	2.12	N/A	1st	SF	R3	DNQ		2,637	(Zimbabwe) Joseph Ngwenya	11
2014	3	USL Pro	28	13	3	12	53	28	+25	51	1.82	N/A	4th	SF	R4	DNQ		2,679	(England) Matthew Delicâte	16
2015	3	USL	28	10	7	11	41	35	+6	41	1.46	6th	12th	R1	R4	DNQ		3,747	(United States) Jason Yeisley	8
2016	3	USL	30	12	9	9	33	26	+7	45	1.50	7th	12th	R1	R3	DNQ		3,996	(Japan) Yudai Imura	11
2017	2	USL	32	8	16	8	24	36	–12	32	1.00	14th	25th	DNQ	R3	DNQ		4,665	(Sierra Leone) Alhaji Kamara	4
2018	2	USL	34	6	24	4	30	80	–50	22	0.65	15th	31st	DNQ	R4	DNQ		3,976	(United States) Brian Shriver (Cuba) Heviel Cordovés	7
2019	3	USL L1	28	9	14	5	26	35	–9	32	1.14	N/A	9th	DNQ	R2	DNQ		3,468	(United States) Joe Gallardo	6
2020	3	USL L1	16	8	6	2	22	22	0	26	1.63	N/A	4th	DNQ	NH	DNQ		875	(Argentina) Emiliano Terzaghi	10
2021	3	USL L1	28	11	10	7	35	35	–1	40	1.43	N/A	5th	QF	NH	DNQ		2,051	(Argentina) Emiliano Terzaghi	18 ♦
2022	3	USL L1	30	14	7	9	54	35	+19	51	1.70	N/A	1st	SF	R4	DNQ		3,551	(Argentina) Emiliano Terzaghi	17 ♦
2023	3	USL L1	32	6	15	11	42	55	–13	29	0.91	N/A	11th	DNQ	R3	DNQ		4,786	(Argentina) Emiliano Terzaghi	12
2024	3	USL L1	22	6	10	6	25	34	–9	24	1.09	N/A	8th	QF	R3	DNQ		4,672	(England) Chandler O'Dwyer	7
2025		USL L1	30	8	17	5	43	53	–10	29	1.43		13th	DNQ	R1			4,369	(Honduras) Darwin Espinal	9
Total	–	–	832	386	285	161	1262	1046	+216	1329	1.61	–	–	–	–	–		–	(England) Matthew Delicâte	113

1. Avg. attendance only includes statistics from regular season matches.
2. Top goalscorer(s) includes all goals scored in the regular season, playoffs, U.S. Open Cup, and other competitive matches.
3. Points and PPG have been adjusted from non-traditional to traditional scoring systems for seasons prior to 2003 to more effectively compare historical team performance across seasons.
