= 2005 Richmond Kickers season =

Richmond Kickers
2005 season
- Owner: Rob Ukrop
- Head coach: Leigh Cowlishaw
- Stadium: University of Richmond Stadium; Richmond, Virginia
- USL-1: League: 6th Playoffs: Final
- U.S. Open Cup: Fourth round
- James River Cup: Winners (3–1–0)
- Highest home attendance: 8,412 vs. D.C. United (August 4 U.S. Open Cup)
- Lowest home attendance: 702 vs. Ocean City (July 13; U.S. Open Cup)
Home colors	Away colors

The 2005 Richmond Kickers season was the club's thirteenth season in existence. The club played in the USL First Division, which represented the second-tier of American soccer.

Playing in the second tier of American soccer for the past nine seasons, this season was the Kickers' final season of playing in the second tier until 2017, as the club self-relegated themselves starting the following season. The reasons primarily emphasized financial stability, stating that the club would be more profitable in the third division rather than the second.

== Background ==
The Kickers came off a successful 2004 campaign that saw the club finish second in the A-League Eastern Division. Amassing a total of 17 wins, eight losses and three draws, the Kickers posted 54 points that season, having the third strongest overall record in the league, behind Portland Timbers and Montreal Impact. The former VCU standout, McColm Cephas lead the team in scoring during the 2004 season, tallying 10 goals.

== Competitions ==
=== USL First Division ===
==== Standings ====
Commissioner's Cup, bye to semifinal round of playoffs
Bye to semifinal round of playoffs
First round of playoffs

Pos	Club	Pts	Pld	W	L	T	GF	GA	GD	Qualification	H2H Pts
1	Montreal Impact	61	28	18	3	7	37	15	+22	Commissioner's Cup, 2005 USL Playoffs Semifinals	
2	Rochester Raging Rhinos	51	28	15	7	6	45	27	+18	2005 USL Playoffs Semifinals	
3	Vancouver Whitecaps	45	28	12	7	9	37	21	+16	2005 USL Playoffs First round	
4	Seattle Sounders	44	28	11	6	11	33	25	+8	2005 USL Playoffs First round	
5	Portland Timbers	39	28	10	9	9	40	42	−2	2005 USL Playoffs First round	POR: 4 pts RIC: 1 pt
6	Richmond Kickers	39	28	10	9	9	28	30	−2	2005 USL Playoffs First round	POR: 4 pts RIC: 1 pt
7	Puerto Rico Islanders	38	28	10	10	8	46	43	+3		
8	Atlanta Silverbacks	33	28	10	15	3	40	52	−12		
9	Charleston Battery	32	28	9	14	5	27	36	−9		
10	Minnesota Thunder	31	28	7	11	10	37	42	−5		
11	Virginia Beach Mariners	28	28	7	14	7	26	39	−13		
12	Toronto Lynx	17	28	3	17	8	26	50	−24		

==== Game reports ====
April 16, 2005 1	Richmond Kickers	3–1	Atlanta Silverbacks	Richmond, Virginia
				Stadium: University of Richmond Stadium; Attendance: 2,975

April 22, 2005 2 James River Cup	Richmond Kickers	2–1	Virginia Beach Mariners	Richmond, Virginia
				Stadium: University of Richmond Stadium; Attendance: 2,354

April 23, 2005 3 James River Cup	Virginia Beach Mariners	1–0	Richmond Kickers	Virginia Beach, Virginia
				Stadium: Virginia Beach Sportsplex; Attendance: 781

April 30, 2005 4	Richmond Kickers	2–1	Toronto Lynx	Richmond, Virginia
				Stadium: University of Richmond Stadium; Attendance: 2,452

May 8, 2005 5	Richmond Kickers	0–0	Montreal Impact	Richmond, Virginia
				Stadium: University of Richmond Stadium; Attendance: 2,567

May 11, 2005 6 James River Cup	Richmond Kickers	3–1	Virginia Beach Mariners	Richmond, Virginia
				Stadium: University of Richmond Stadium; Attendance: 1,611

May 13, 2005 7 James River Cup	Virginia Beach Mariners	0–1	Richmond Kickers	Virginia Beach, Virginia
				Stadium: Virginia Beach Sportsplex; Attendance: 749

May 15, 2005 8	Atlanta Silverbacks	1–2	Richmond Kickers	Clarkston, Georgia
				Stadium: DeKalb Memorial Stadium; Attendance: 1,812

May 21, 2005 9	Richmond Kickers	3–1	Minnesota Thunder	Richmond, Virginia
				Stadium: University of Richmond Stadium; Attendance: 3,812

May 30, 2005 10	Richmond Kickers	2–0	Charleston Battery	Richmond, Virginia
				Stadium: University of Richmond Stadium; Attendance: 2,591

June 3, 2005 11	Richmond Kickers	0–2	Seattle Sounders	Richmond, Virginia
				Stadium: University of Richmond Stadium; Attendance: 2,411

June 11, 2005 12	Richmond Kickers	1–1	Atlanta Silverbacks	Richmond, Virginia
				Stadium: University of Richmond Stadium; Attendance: 3,658

June 17, 2005 13	Charleston Battery	2–1	Richmond Kickers	Charleston, South Carolina
				Stadium: Blackbaud Stadium; Attendance: 4,731

June 24, 2005 14	Puerto Rico Islanders	3–1	Richmond Kickers	Bayamón, Puerto Rico
				Stadium: Loubriel Stadium; Attendance: 4,118

July 2, 2005 15	Richmond Kickers	1–0	Puerto Rico Islanders	Richmond, Virginia
				Stadium: University of Richmond Stadium; Attendance: 3,412

July 6, 2005 16	Montreal Impact	2–0	Richmond Kickers	Montreal
				Stadium: Complexe sportif Claude-Robillard; Attendance: 10,503

July 9, 2005 17	Atlanta Silverbacks	1–2	Richmond Kickers	Clarkston, Georgia
				Stadium: DeKalb Memorial Stadium; Attendance: 1,112

July 17, 2005 18	Richmond Kickers	0–1	Charleston Battery	Richmond, Virginia
				Stadium: University of Richmond Stadium; Attendance: 2,361

July 22, 2005 19	Richmond Kickers	0–0	Rochester Raging Rhinos	Richmond, Virginia
				Stadium: University of Richmond Stadium; Attendance: 2,651

July 30, 2005 20	Rochester Raging Rhinos	0–0	Richmond Kickers	Rochester, New York
				Stadium: Frontier Field; Attendance: 11,113

July 31, 2005 21	Toronto Lynx	0–0	Richmond Kickers	Toronto, Ontario
				Stadium: Centennial Park Stadium; Attendance: 1,946

August 7, 2005 22	Richmond Kickers	0–2	Vancouver Whitecaps	Richmond, Virginia
				Stadium: University of Richmond Stadium; Attendance: 2,011

August 13, 2005 23	Seattle Sounders	1–1	Richmond Kickers	Seattle
				Stadium: Qwest Field; Attendance: 2,446

August 14, 2005 24	Vancouver Whitecaps	1–1	Richmond Kickers	Vancouver
				Stadium: Swangard Stadium; Attendance: 4,875

August 20, 2005 25	Charleston Battery	1–1	Richmond Kickers	Charleston, South Carolina
				Stadium: Blackbaud Stadium; Attendance: 3,578

August 28, 2005 26	Minnesota Thunder	2–0	Richmond Kickers	Saint Paul, Minnesota
				Stadium: James Griffin Stadium; Attendance: 3,414

September 3, 2005 27	Richmond Kickers	1–1	Portland Timbers	Richmond, Virginia
				Stadium: University of Richmond Stadium; Attendance: 2,289

September 10, 2005 28	Portland Timbers	3–0	Richmond Kickers	Portland, Oregon
				Stadium: PGE Park; Attendance: 7,858

=== USL Playoffs ===
==== First round ====
September 16, 2005 Leg 1	Richmond Kickers	0–0	Vancouver Whitecaps	Richmond, Virginia
				Stadium: University of Richmond Stadium; Attendance: 2,476

September 18, 2005 Leg 2	Vancouver Whitecaps	0–0 (a.e.t.) (0–0 agg.) (4–5 p)	Richmond Kickers	Vancouver
				Stadium: Swangard Stadium; Attendance: 5,332

==== Semifinals ====
September 23, 2005 Leg 1	Richmond Kickers	3–1	Rochester Rhinos	Richmond, Virginia
				Stadium: University of Richmond Stadium; Attendance: 2,672

September 25, 2005 Leg 2	Rochester Raging Rhinos	1–1 (a.e.t.) (1–4 agg.)	Richmond Kickers	Rochester, New York
				Stadium: Frontier Field; Attendance: 6,195

==== Championship ====
October 1, 2005 Final	Seattle Sounders	1–1 (a.e.t.) (4–3 p)	Richmond Kickers	Seattle
				Stadium: Qwest Field; Attendance: 8,011

=== U.S. Open Cup ===
July 13, 2005 Third round	Richmond Kickers (Virginia)	8–4	(New Jersey) Ocean City Barons	Richmond, Virginia
	Luzak 12'; Cephas 13', 16', 28'; Jeffrey 69'; Brown 77'; Bobo 82'; Delicate 84'	Report	Carmichael 4', 41'; Donatelli 54'; Todd 84'	Stadium: Sports Backers Stadium; Attendance: 702; Referee: Ben Jones

August 4, 2005 Fourth round	Richmond Kickers (Virginia)	1–3	(Washington, D.C.) D.C. United	Tuckahoe, Virginia
	Cephas 69'	Report	Adu 26'; Gómez 76' (pen.) 81'	Stadium: University of Richmond Stadium; Attendance: 8,412; Referee: Abbey Okulaja

== See also ==
- Richmond Kickers
- List of Richmond Kickers seasons
- 2005 United Soccer Leagues
- 2005 U.S. Open Cup
- 2005 in American soccer
