= 1999 Richmond Kickers season =

Richmond Kickers
1999 season
- USL A-League: 2nd place, Atlantic Division
- USL A-League Play Offs: Conference Quarterfinals

The 1999 Richmond Kickers season was the Richmond Kickers' seventh season of existence, and their third consecutive season in the A-League, the second division of the American soccer pyramid from 1995 until 2004.

== Roster ==
The following players played for the Kickers during the 1999 season.

Note: Flags indicate national team as defined under FIFA eligibility rules; some limited exceptions apply. Players may hold more than one non-FIFA nationality.

No.	Pos.	Nation	Player
1	GK	USA	Mike McGinty
2	DF	USA	Kevin Scott
3	FW	USA	Roger Thomas
4	MF	USA	Trip Ellis
5	DF	USA	Chris Fox
6	FW	USA	Rob Ukrop
7	FW	HAI	Derrick Etienne, Sr.
8	DF	CAN	Nevio Pizzolitto
9	MF	USA	Paul Lekics
10	MF	USA	Matt Borgard
11	MF	USA	Tony Williams
12	MF	HON	Orlando Bueso

No.	Pos.	Nation	Player
13	FW	NIR	Leigh Cowlishaw
14	FW	CAN	Dwayne DeRosario
15	DF	HAI	Darrell Etienne
16	DF	USA	Josh McKay
17	FW	TRI	Gary Glasgow
18	FW	JAM	Onandi Lowe
20	MF	USA	Marco Ferruzzi
21	FW	UKR	Ihor Dotsenko
22	GK	USA	Alex Deegan
24	MF	JAM	Gregory Messam
25	FW	ENG	Lee Radzki
26	MF	USA	Mark Jonas
27	MF	USA	Erin Wilson

== Competitions ==
=== A-League ===
==== Standings ====
Place	Team	GP	W	L	SW	SL	GF	GA	GD	BP	Points
1	Hershey Wildcats	28	17	11	2	1	54	33	+21	10	75
2	Richmond Kickers	28	17	11	3	1	51	44	+7	6	69
3	Charleston Battery	28	15	13	3	2	43	39	+4	6	62
4	Jacksonville Cyclones	28	13	15	1	1	51	61	-10	9	59
5	Atlanta Silverbacks	28	15	13	1	1	51	61	-10	9	59
6	Hampton Roads Mariners	28	15	13	5	2	45	41	+4	5	57
6	Raleigh Express	28	11	17	2	2	32	50	-18	5	47
6	Maryland Mania	28	3	25	1	1	16	85	-69	2	13

==== Match results ====
April 24, 1999 1	Long Island Rough Riders	0–1	Richmond Kickers	South Huntington, New York
7:30 p.m. EST		Report		Stadium: Cy Donnelly Stadium; Attendance: 3,208

May 1, 1999 2	Richmond Kickers	2–1 (a.e.t.)	Hampton Roads Mariners	Richmond, Virginia
7:00 p.m. EST		Report		Stadium: University of Richmond Stadium; Attendance: 2,179

May 7, 1999 3	Richmond Kickers	1–0 (a.e.t.)	Toronto Lynx	Richmond, Virginia
7:00 p.m. EST		Report		Stadium: University of Richmond Stadium; Attendance: 4,014

May 14, 1999 4	Charleston Battery	3–1	Richmond Kickers	Charleston, South Carolina
7:30 p.m. EST		Report		Stadium: Blackbaud Stadium; Attendance: 4,317

May 22, 1999 5	Hampton Roads Mariners	2–1	Richmond Kickers	Virginia Beach, Virginia
7:30 p.m. EST		Report		Stadium: Virginia Beach Sportsplex

May 28, 1999 6	Atlanta Silverbacks	2–3 (a.e.t.)	Richmond Kickers	Clarkston, Georgia
7:35 p.m. EST		Report		Stadium: DeKalb Memorial Stadium; Attendance: 1,832

June 4, 1999 7	Richmond Kickers	1–0	Maryland Mania	Richmond, Virginia
7:00 p.m. EST		Report		Stadium: University of Richmond Stadium; Attendance: 2,079

=== A-League Playoffs ===
September 11, 1999	Staten Island Vipers	3–2 (a.e.t.)	Richmond Kickers	Staten Island, New York
	Inneh 27', 57'; Dugas 97'		Glasgow 30', 80'	Attendance: 1,452
