= 1993 Richmond Kickers season =

Richmond Kickers
1993 season
- Owner: Cookie Ketcham
- Head coach: Bobby Lennon
- Stadium: First Market Stadium
- USISL: Division: 4th Overall: 20th
- USISL Cup: Second round
- U.S. Open Cup: Did not enter
Home colors	Away colors

The 1993 Richmond Kickers season was the inaugural season for the club. In their first season of competitive soccer, the Kickers played in the United States Interregional Soccer League, which at the time served as the third division of the American soccer pyramid. The Kickers played their first season on the campus of the University of Richmond at the site of the former East Market Stadium.

In the inaugural season the Kickers played in the Atlantic Division, where they finished in fourth place in the division, qualifying for the play-in round of the playoffs. Richmond defeated the Charleston Battery, who would eventually become bitter rivals with the team, as they were some of the few surviving clubs from the early 90s, in the play-in round, before eventually losing to the Greensboro Dynamo in the divisional playoff semifinals.

== Squad ==
=== Roster ===
The following players were part of the 1993 squad.

Note: Flags indicate national team as defined under FIFA eligibility rules; some limited exceptions apply. Players may hold more than one non-FIFA nationality.

No.	Pos.	Nation	Player
1	DF	SCO	Liam Behrens
2	DF	ENG	Tony Blunt
3	MF	USA	Matt Borgard
4	GK	USA	Scott Budnick
5	MF	USA	Patrick Burke
6	DF	USA	Karlton Byrd
7	FW	NIR	Leigh Cowlishaw
8	DF	USA	Scott Davis
9	FW	USA	John Dugan
10	FW	USA	Eric Dumbleton

No.	Pos.	Nation	Player
11	MF	USA	Mike Huwiler
12	MF	USA	Cookie Ketcham
13	DF	USA	Ted Gillen
14	GK	USA	Joe O'Carroll
15	DF	USA	Sean Phillips
16	DF	USA	Duncan Satchell
17	FW	USA	Khary Stockton
19	FW	USA	Rob Ukrop
20	MF	USA	Richie Williams

=== Team management ===
The following individuals were part of the club's management for the 1993 season.

Position	Staff
Owner, Office Manager, and Director	(United States) Cookie Ketcham
Owner, Coach, and General Manager	(United States) Bobby Lennon
Athletic Trainer	(United States) Jack Thomas
Athletic Trainer	(United States) Kathlene Watz

Source: Source

== Competitions ==
=== Exhibitions ===
June 4, 1993	Richmond Kickers	v	International opponent	Richmond, Virginia
7:35 p.m. EDT				Stadium: University of Richmond Soccer Stadium

=== USISL regular season ===
==== Table ====
===== Atlantic Division =====
Pos.	Team	Pld.	W	L	GF	GA	GD	Pts.	Qualification
2	Delaware Wizards	16	10	6	34	22	+12	88	Playoffs
3	Raleigh Flyers	16	10	6	31	24	+7	84	Playoffs
4	Richmond Kickers	16	8	8	30	30	0	78	Playoffs
5	Charleston Battery	16	8	8	27	33	−6	72	Playoffs
6	Connecticut Wolves	16	7	9	29	33	−4	68	

==== Results ====
April 30, 1993 1	Columbia Spirit	3–2 (OT)	Richmond Kickers	Columbia, South Carolina
7:30 p.m. EDT	Mario Lone 5:30'; Nigel James 20:30'	Report	Leigh Colishaw 89'	Stadium: Eugene E. Stone III Stadium

May 1, 1993 2	Charleston Battery	2–1	Richmond Kickers	Charleston, South Carolina
7:30 p.m. EDT	Mario Lone 5:30'; Nigel James 20:30'	Report	Leigh Colishaw 89'	Stadium: Stoney Field; Attendance: 2,132

May 8, 1993 3	Richmond Kickers	2–0	Columbia Spirit	Richmond, Virginia
7:35 p.m. EDT				Stadium: University of Richmond Soccer Complex; Attendance: 2,791

May 15, 1993 4	Raleigh Flyers	2–1	Richmond Kickers	Raleigh, North Carolina
7:35 p.m. EDT		Report		Stadium: Method Road

May 22, 1993	Richmond Kickers	1–2	Connecticut Wolves	Richmond, Virginia
7:35 p.m. EDT				Stadium: University of Richmond Soccer Complex; Attendance: 2,620

May 28, 1993	Richmond Kickers	2–3	Baltimore Bays	Richmond, Virginia
7:35 p.m. EDT				Stadium: University of Richmond Soccer Complex; Attendance: 2,076

June 12, 1993	Greensboro Dynamo	4–0	Richmond Kickers	Greensboro, North Carolina
7:30 p.m. EDT		Report		Stadium: UNGC Stadium; Attendance: 1,450

June 18, 1993	Richmond Kickers	2–0	Raleigh Flyers	Richmond, Virginia
7:35 p.m. EDT				Stadium: University of Richmond Soccer Complex; Attendance: 2,812

July 2, 1993	Richmond Kickers	3–0	Dallas Rockets	Richmond, Virginia
7:35 p.m. EDT				Stadium: University of Richmond Soccer Complex; Attendance: 2,143

July 9, 1993	Richmond Kickers	2–4	Delaware Wizards	Richmond, Virginia
7:35 p.m. EDT				Stadium: University of Richmond Soccer Complex; Attendance: 1,623

July 17, 1993	Richmond Kickers	2–1	Charlotte Eagles	Richmond, Virginia
7:35 p.m. EDT				Stadium: University of Richmond Soccer Complex; Attendance: 2,572

July 24, 1993	Richmond Kickers	2–0	Charleston Battery	Richmond, Virginia
7:35 p.m. EDT				Stadium: University of Richmond Soccer Complex; Attendance: 2,539

=== USISL Playoffs ===
1993 First round	Richmond Kickers	2–0	Charleston Battery	Richmond, Virginia
EDT	Goal			Stadium: First Market Stadium

1993 Second round	Greensboro Dynamo	4–1	Richmond Kickers	Greensboro, North Carolina
EDT	Mike Gailey 14', 58', 61'; Jason Haupt 62'	Report	89:30' Robert Ukrop	Stadium: UNCG Soccer Stadium; Attendance: 1,825

== Transfers ==
=== In ===
No.	Pos.	Player	Transferred from	Fee/notes	Date	Source
1	DF	(Scotland) Liam Behrens	(United States) VCU Rams	Free	April 1, 1993	
2	DF	(England) Tony Blunt	(United States) Old Dominion Monarchs	Free	April 1, 1993	
3	MF	(United States) Matt Borgard	(United States) South Florida Bulls	Free	April 1, 1993	

=== Loan in ===
No.	Pos.	Player	Loaned from	Start	End	Source
4	GK	(United States) Scott Budnick	(United States) William & Mary Tribe	April 1, 1993	August 1, 1993	

== See also ==
- List of Richmond Kickers seasons
- Richmond Kickers
