= 2005 United Soccer Leagues =

United Soccer Leagues
- Season: 2005

Men's soccer
- USL First Division: Seattle Sounders
- USL Second Division: Charlotte Eagles

The 2005 USL season was the first following a rebranding of two United Soccer Leagues operated leagues. The A-League and the Pro Soccer League were renamed to the USL First Division and USL Second Division, respectively. These leagues also became single table this year, ending the use of regional conferences.

== Changes from 2004 ==
- The Syracuse Salty Dogs, Milwaukee Wave United, Edmonton Aviators, and Calgary Mustangs of the First Division folded following the 2004 season.
- The Utah Blitzz of the Second Division folded following the 2004 season.
- The Cincinnati Kings joined the Second Division as an expansion club.
- The Westchester Flames, San Diego Gauchos, and California Gold switched from the Second Division to the PDL.

== Summary ==
Competition	Champion	Runner-up	Regular season champion/best USL team
USL First Division	Seattle Sounders	Richmond Kickers	Montreal Impact
USL Second Division	Charlotte Eagles	Western Mass Pioneers	Western Mass Pioneers
USL PDL	Des Moines Menace	El Paso Patriots	Orange County Blue Star
U.S. Open Cup	Los Angeles Galaxy (MLS)	FC Dallas (MLS)	Minnesota Thunder (lost in semifinal)
Voyageurs Cup	Montreal Impact	Vancouver Whitecaps	n/a

== First Division ==
USL First Division
- Season: 2005
- Champions: Seattle Sounders (1st Title)
- Regular Season title: Montreal Impact (1st Title)
- Matches: 168
- Goals: 422 (2.51 per match)
- Best Player: (Canada) Jason Jordan, Vancouver Whitecaps
- Top goalscorer: (Canada) Jason Jordan, Vancouver Whitecaps (17 goals)
- Best goalkeeper: (Canada) Greg Sutton, Montreal Impact

Pos	Team	Pld	W	L	T	GF	GA	GD	Pts	Qualification
1	Montreal Impact (S)	28	18	3	7	37	15	+22	61	Semifinal of playoffs
2	Rochester Raging Rhinos	28	15	7	6	45	27	+18	51	Semifinal of playoffs
3	Vancouver Whitecaps	28	12	7	9	37	21	+16	45	First round of playoffs
4	Seattle Sounders (C)	28	11	6	11	33	25	+8	44	First round of playoffs
5	Portland Timbers	28	10	9	9	40	42	−2	39 (Note: POR: 4 pts; RIC: 1 pt)	First round of playoffs
6	Richmond Kickers	28	10	9	9	28	30	−2	39	First round of playoffs
7	Puerto Rico Islanders	28	10	10	8	46	43	+3	38	
8	Atlanta Silverbacks	28	10	15	3	40	52	−12	33	
9	Charleston Battery	28	9	14	5	27	36	−9	32	
10	Minnesota Thunder	28	7	11	10	37	42	−5	31	
11	Virginia Beach Mariners	28	7	14	7	26	39	−13	28	
12	Toronto Lynx	28	3	17	8	26	50	−24	17	

(C) Champions; (S) Commissioner's Cup (regular season winner)

=== Playoffs ===
Each round except the final was a two-game aggregate goal series decided by extra time and a penalty shoot-out immediately following the second game of the series, if necessary. The away goals rule was not used as a tie-breaker. Tournament was re-seeded after the first round.

Quarterfinals
4	Seattle Sounders	1	2	3
5	Portland Timbers	0	0	0
3	Vancouver Whitecaps	0	0	0 (4)
6	Richmond Kickers (p)	0	0	0 (5)

Semifinals
1	Montreal Impact	2	1	3
4	Seattle Sounders	2	2	4
2	Rochester Raging Rhinos	1	1	2
6	Richmond Kickers	1	3	4

Finals
4	Seattle Sounders (p)	1 (4)
6	Richmond Kickers	1 (3)

==== Quarterfinals ====
September 16, 2005
7::00 PM ET
Leg 1

Richmond Kickers	0–0	Vancouver Whitecaps
Cephas (yellow card) 13'; Worthen (yellow card) 69'	Report	Clarke (yellow card) 58'; Dasovic (yellow card) 64'

University of Richmond Stadium
Richmond, Virginia
Attendance: 2,476
Referee: Joe Cardecio
September 18, 2005
10:00 PM ET
Leg 2

Vancouver Whitecaps	0–0	Richmond Kickers
Nash (yellow card) 42'; Morris (yellow card) 49'; Lyall (yellow card) 112'	Report	Brown (yellow card) 15'; Williams (yellow card) 99'
Penalties
Corazzin (penalty scored); Franks (penalty missed); Nash (penalty scored); Kindel (penalty scored); Dasovic (penalty scored)	4–5	(penalty scored) Ssejjemba; (penalty scored) Delicate; (penalty scored) Gorres; (penalty scored) Worthen; (penalty scored) Jeffrey

Swangard Stadium
Burnaby, British Columbia
Attendance: 5,332
Referee: Steve De Piero

Richmond Kickers won 5–4 on Penalty kicks after tying both games 0–0.

September 16, 2005
10:00 PM EDT
First Leg

Portland Timbers	0–1	Seattle Sounders
Miranda (yellow card) 30'	Report	Levesque 2'; Scott (yellow card) 32'; Sleeth (yellow card) 45'; O'Brien (yellow card) 72'; Gregor (yellow card) 90'

PGE Park
Portland, Oregon
Attendance: 5,667
Referee: Yader Reyes
September 18, 2005
10:00 PM EDT

Seattle Sounders	2–0	Portland Timbers
Levesque 5', 54'; O'Brien (yellow card) 29'	Report	Marcum (yellow card) 17'; Alvarez (yellow card) 22'; Lines (yellow card) 25' (yellow-red card) 27'

Starfire Sports Complex
Tukwila, Washington
Attendance: 2,543
Referee: Fotis Bazakos

Seattle Sounders won 3–0 on Aggregate.

==== Semifinals ====
September 23, 2005
7:00 PM EDT
First Leg

Richmond Kickers	3–1	Rochester Raging Rhinos
Delicate 12', 55'; Brown (yellow card) 41'; Worthen 65'	Report	15' (o.g.); Sedgewick (yellow card) 56'; Miller (yellow card) 68'; Howes (yellow card) 70'

University of Richmond Stadium
Richmond, Virginia
Attendance: 2,672
Referee: Tony Crush
September 25, 2005
7:00 PM EDT
Second Leg

Rochester Raging Rhinos	1–1	Richmond Kickers
Carrieri (yellow card) 55'; Bobo (yellow card) 88'; Carabajal (red card) 90'; Miller 90+5' (pen.)	Report	Delicate 51'; Vallow (yellow card) 55'; Schweitzer (yellow card) 81'; Cephas (red card) 90'

Frontier Field
Rochester, New York
Attendance: 6,195
Referee: Agusto St Silva

Richmond Kickers won 4–2 on Aggregate.

September 23, 2005
10:00 PM EDT
First Leg

Seattle Sounders	2–2	Montreal Impact
Sturm 10'; O'Brien 22' (yellow card) 34'; Sleeth (yellow card) 44'	Report	Gervais (yellow card) 21'; Vincello (yellow card) 22'; Burpo (yellow card) 62'; Gbeke 86', 88'

Starfire Sports Complex
Tukwila, Washington
Attendance: 2,698
Referee: Ramon Hernandez
September 25, 2005
4:00 PM EDT
Second Leg

Montreal Impact	1–2	Seattle Sounders
Pizzolitto (yellow card) 28'; Gervais (yellow card) 67'	Report	Edwards (yellow card) 32'; Levesque (yellow card) 52' (goal) 90'; Whitfield 59'; Gregor (yellow card) 78'; Sakuda (yellow card) 90'

Claude Robillard Sports Complex
Montreal, Quebec
Attendance: 10,124
Referee: Silviu Petrescu

Seattle Sounders won 4–3 on Aggregate.

==== Final ====
October 1, 2005
11:00 PM EDT

Seattle Sounders	1–1 (a.e.t.)	Richmond Kickers
Scott (yellow card) 19'; Edwards (yellow card) 45'; Klaas (yellow card) 65'; Galindo 73'; Gregor (yellow card) 79'	Report	Carrieri (yellow card) 17'; Brown (yellow card) 19'; Gorres 24'; Burke (yellow card) 29'
Penalties
Gregor (penalty scored); O'Brien (penalty scored); Levesque (penalty missed); Somoza (penalty missed); Graham (penalty missed); Sakuda (penalty scored); Jenkins (penalty scored)	4–3	(penalty missed) Delicate; (penalty missed) Ssejjemba; (penalty scored) Gorres; (penalty scored) Williams; (penalty missed) Jeffrey; (penalty scored) Pauls; (penalty missed) Pascale

Qwest Field
Seattle, Washington
Attendance: 8,011
Referee: Ricardo Valenzuela

==== Awards and All-League Teams ====
First Team
F: (Jamaica) Fabian Dawkins (Atlanta Silverbacks); (Canada) Jason Jordan (Vancouver Whitecaps) (MVP & Leading Goalscorer); (Brazil) Mauricio Salles (Puerto Rico Islanders)
M: (Mexico) Hugo Alcaraz-Cuellar (Portland Timbers); (Canada) Mauro Biello (Montreal Impact); (United States) Steve Klein (Vancouver Whitecaps); (United States) Kirk Wilson (Rochester Raging Rhinos)
D: (Canada) Gabriel Gervais (Montreal Impact); (United States) Taylor Graham (Seattle Sounders) (Defender of the Year); (United States) Scot Thompson (Portland Timbers)
G: (Canada) Greg Sutton (Montreal Impact) (Goalkeeper of the Year)
Coach: (Canada) Nick De Santis (Montreal Impact) (Coach of the Year)

Second Team
F: (United States) Dan Antoniuk (Portland Timbers); (Liberia) Johnny Menyongar (Minnesota Thunder); (Liberia) Melvin Tarley (Minnesota Thunder)
M: (England) Darren Caskey (Virginia Beach Mariners); (United States) Jeff Matteo (Minnesota Thunder); (Chile) Rodrigo Rios (Atlanta Silverbacks); Petter Villegas (Puerto Rico Islanders))
D: (United States) Ben Hollingsworth (Charleston Battery); (United States) Peter Luzak (Richmond Kickers); (Canada) Nevio Pizzolitto (Montreal Impact)
G: (United States) Preston Burpo (Seattle Sounders)

== Second Division ==
USL Second Division
- Season: 2005
- Champions: Charlotte Eagles (2nd Title)
- Regular Season title: Western Mass Pioneers (2nd Title)
- Matches: 90
- Goals: 307 (3.41 per match)
- Best Player: (United States) Jacob Coggins, Charlotte Eagles
- Top goalscorer: (United States) Jacob Coggins, Charlotte Eagles (14 goals)
- Best goalkeeper: (United States) Chris McClellan, Charlotte Eagles

Pos	Team	Pld	W	L	D	GF	GA	GD	Pts	Qualification
1	Western Mass Pioneers (S)	20	13	3	4	41	22	+19	43	Playoff berth clinched
2	Charlotte Eagles (C)	20	13	5	2	44	20	+24	41	Playoff berth clinched
3	Harrisburg City Islanders	20	12	3	5	43	24	+19	41	Playoff berth clinched
4	Wilmington Hammerheads	20	12	6	2	45	23	+22	38	Playoff berth clinched
5	Cincinnati Kings	20	7	8	5	28	23	+5	26	
6	Long Island Rough Riders	20	7	13	0	29	42	−13	21	
7	Pittsburgh Riverhounds	20	6	11	3	32	25	+7	21	
8	New Hampshire Phantoms	20	6	11	3	29	38	−9	21	
9	Northern Virginia Royals	20	2	18	0	16	90	−74	6	

Source: rsssf.com
(C) Champions; (S) Regular season winner

=== Playoffs ===
Semifinals
1	Western Mass Pioneers	0	3	3
4	Wilmington Hammerheads	1	1	2
2	Charlotte Eagles (a.e.t.)	0	4	4
3	Harrisburg City Islanders	1	1	2

Finals
1	Western Mass Pioneers	2 (4)
2	Charlotte Eagles (a.e.t.) (p)	2 (5)

==== Semifinals ====
August 17, 2005
7:30 PM EDT

Wilmington Hammerheads	1–0	Western Mass Pioneers
Miller (yellow card) 45'; Bagley 57'; Krupnik (yellow card) 64'; Corrie (yellow card) 86'; Webb (yellow card) 90'	Report	Augustine (yellow card) 12'; Mahoney (red card) 41'; Fletcher (yellow card) 69'; Maciel (yellow card) 90'

Legion Stadium
Wilmington, North Carolina
Attendance: 1,237
Referee: Kai Goodrich
August 20, 2005
7:30 PM EDT
Second Leg

Western Mass Pioneers	3–1	Wilmington Hammerheads
Willis (yellow card) 1'; Maciel 18', 72'; Krause 75'	Report	Chase (yellow card) 28'; Bagley 53'; Nylen (yellow card) 57'; Gledhill (yellow card) 81'

Lusitano Stadium
Ludlow, Massachusetts
Attendance: 2,970
Referee: Gus St Silva

Western Mass Pioneers won 3–2 on Aggregate.

August 18, 2005
7:05 PM EDT
First Leg

Harrisburg City Islanders	1–0	Charlotte Eagles
Potteiger 83'	Report	Swinehart (yellow card) 88'

Skyline Sports Complex
Harrisburg, Pennsylvania
Attendance: 1,468
Referee: Matt Hamilton
August 20, 2005
7:30 PM EDT
Second Leg

Charlotte Eagles	4–1 (a.e.t.)	Harrisburg City Islanders
Coggins 3', 102' (yellow card) 28'; Johnson 64'; Guastaferro 96'	Report	Severs 25'; Bixler (yellow card) 48'; Potteiger (yellow card) 75'

Waddell Stadium
Charlotte, North Carolina
Attendance: 1,172
Referee: Ken George

Charlotte Eagles won 4–2 on Aggregate. Charlotte lost 0–1 and then on the second leg won 2–1. The tied series in aggregate then went into overtime periods where Charlotte scored 2 goals.

==== Final ====
August 27, 2005
7:30 PM EDT

Western Mass Pioneers	2–2 (a.e.t.)	Charlotte Eagles
Willis (yellow card) 25'; McFarlane 43'; Fernandes 46' (yellow card) 56'; Maciel (yellow card) 58'; Fletcher (yellow card) 79'	Report	Coggins 1' (yellow card) 81'; Swinehart (yellow card) 57'; DiNunzio (yellow card) 58'; Meek (yellow card) 67' (goal) 90+3'
Penalties
Fletcher (penalty scored); Maciel (penalty scored); Fernandes (penalty scored); Deren (penalty scored); Augustine (penalty missed); Moya (penalty missed)	4–5	(penalty scored) Swinehart; (penalty scored) Coggins; (penalty scored) Guastaferro; (penalty scored) DiNunzio; (penalty missed) Watkins; (penalty scored) Meek

Lusitano Stadium
Ludlow, Massachusetts
Attendance: 4,722
Referee: Lee Suckle

== See also ==
- 2005 PDL season
