= 2006 Richmond Kickers season =

Richmond Kickers
2006 season
- Owner: Rob Ukrop
- Head coach: Leigh Cowlishaw
- Stadium: University of Richmond Stadium
- USL-2: 1st
- USL-2 Playoffs: Winners
- U.S. Open Cup: Second round
- James River Cup: Runners-up
- Top goalscorer: Robert Ssejjemba (17)
Home colors	Away colors

The 2006 Richmond Kickers season was the club's fourteenth season in existence. The club played in the USL Second Division, which represented the third-tier of American soccer.

This was the first season since 1996 that the Kickers played in the third division of American soccer. The season was noted for the Kickers winning a regular season and postseason championship. It was the Kickers' second ever league championship, and their first since 1995. It was also their second regular season championship, their first since 2001.

== Non-competitive ==
August 30, 2006	Richmond Kickers	0–0	D.C. United	Richmond, Virginia
		Report		Stadium: University of Richmond Stadium
Note: Match suspended in the 20th minute due to lightning.

== Competitive ==
=== USL-2 ===
April 23, 2006 1	Richmond Kickers	0–1	Cincinnati Kings	Richmond, Virginia
2:00 p.m.	Neagu (yellow card) 39'	Report	Smith 50'; Fiore (yellow card) 54'	Stadium: University of Richmond Stadium; Attendance: 1,327; Referee: James Conlee

May 6, 2006 2	Richmond Kickers	5–0	Long Island Rough Riders	Richmond, Virginia
7:00 p.m.				Stadium: University of Richmond Stadium; Attendance: 1,919

May 12, 2006 3	Charlotte Eagles	2–4	Richmond Kickers	Charlotte, North Carolina
8:00 p.m.				Stadium: Waddell High School; Attendance: 1,472

May 14, 2006 4	Richmond Kickers	5–2	Harrisburg City Islanders	Richmond, Virginia
4:00 p.m.				Stadium: University of Richmond Stadium; Attendance: 894

May 20, 2006 5	Richmond Kickers	1–0	Pittsburgh Riverhounds	Richmond, Virginia
7:00 p.m.				Stadium: University of Richmond Stadium; Attendance: 2,745

May 27, 2006 6	Long Island Rough Riders	0–0	Richmond Kickers	Uniondale, New York
7:30 p.m.				Stadium: Mitchel Athletic Complex; Attendance: 1,802

June 2, 2006 7	Pittsburgh Riverhounds	1–1	Richmond Kickers	North Franklin, Pennsylvania
7:05 p.m.				Stadium: Falconi Field; Attendance: 1,943

June 3, 2006 8	Cincinnati Kings	0–1	Richmond Kickers	Norwood, Ohio
7:00 p.m.				Stadium: XU Soccer Complex; Attendance: 1,263

=== USL-2 Playoffs ===
==== Semifinals ====
August 18, 2006 First leg	Richmond Kickers	2–1	Cincinnati Kings	Richmond, Virginia
7:00 p.m.	Watson 40'; Burke 60' (pen.)	Report	Fiore (yellow card) 14'; Krause (yellow card) 31'; Barton 45'; Jones (yellow card) 47'	Stadium: University of Richmond Stadium; Attendance: 2,187; Referee: James Conlee

August 20, 2006 First leg	Cincinnati Kings	0–0 (1–2 agg.)	Richmond Kickers	Cincinnati, Ohio
7:00 p.m.		Report		Stadium: XU Soccer Complex; Attendance: 1,202

==== Final ====
August 26, 2006	Richmond Kickers	2–1	Charlotte Eagles	Richmond, Virginia
7:00 p.m.	Ssejjemba 9' (pen.); Carrieri 34' (yellow card) 34'	Report	Spencer 90'	Stadium: University of Richmond Stadium; Attendance: 3,288; Referee: Daniel Stead

=== U.S. Open Cup ===
June 28, 2006 Second round	Carolina Dynamo (North Carolina)	1–0	(Virginia) Richmond Kickers	Greensboro, North Carolina
7:00 p.m.	Hunter 30'	Report		Stadium: Macpherson Stadium; Attendance: 1,460; Referee: Charles Mitchell

== Transfers ==
=== Loan out ===
Pos.	Player	Loaned to	Beginning	End	Source
FW	Robert Ssejjemba (Uganda)	D.C. United (United States)	September 15, 2006	November 15, 2006	
