= 2018 Richmond Kickers season =

Richmond Kickers
2018 season
- Owner: RKYSC
- Head coach: Leigh Cowlishaw (until June 26); David Bulow (since June 27)
- Stadium: City Stadium
- USL: East: 11th Overall: 22nd
- USL Playoffs: TBD
- U.S. Open Cup: Fourth round
- Top goalscorer: League: Shriver; Cordovés (7); All: Shriver; Cordovés (7)
- Highest home attendance: 7,356 (Jul 26 vs ESP — Friendly)
- Lowest home attendance: 1,957 (May 24 vs PNFC — USOC)
- Average home league attendance: 4,894
Home colors	Away colors

The 2018 Richmond Kickers season was the club's 26th season of existence. It was also the club's 11th season playing in the second tier of American soccer, and their seventh straight season in the United Soccer League, since renamed the USL Championship.

The Kickers failed to improve on their 2017 campaign, and saw the team failed to qualify for the playoffs for consecutive seasons for the first time in club history. It was the fourth season in the club's history where they failed to qualify for the postseason. The Kickers finished with six wins, their fewest since 1994, and 24 losses, their most ever. During the season, the Kickers saw their long-time head coach, Leigh Cowlishaw step down from the post, and David Bulow take up coaching duties for the second half of the 2018 season.

On September 11, 2018, the Kickers announced that due to financial issues associated with competing in the main USL, they would self-relegate themselves and become a founding member of USL League One, a new third-tier professional league operated by USL's parent company, United Soccer League (not to be confused with the former name of its top league).

== Background ==
The club is looking to improve off of a historically poor season. During the 2017 campaign, the Kickers finished with an 8–16–8 record, causing them to miss the playoffs for the first time since 2003. The Kickers amassed a club low 25 goals in the 32-match season. The club finished 14th out of 15 teams in the USL's Eastern Conference, and finished 26th in the 30-team league. The Kickers also suffered a second round exit in the U.S. Open Cup, losing to amateur outfit, Christos FC. It was the Kickers' shortest spell in the Open Cup since 2009.

== Roster ==
As of March 16, 2018.

No.	Name	Nat	Position	Since	Date of birth (age)	Signed from	Games	Goals
Goalkeepers
1	Trevor Spangenberg	(United States)	GK	2018	April 21, 1991 (age 35)	Puerto Rico FC	0	0
45	Kent Dickey	(United States)	GK	2018	March 7, 2000 (age 26)	(United States) Richmond Strikers	0	0
48	Travis Worra	(United States)	GK	2018	April 9, 1993 (age 33)	(United States) D.C. United (loan)	23	0
50	Zachery Tashjy	(United States)	GK	2018	March 21, 1995 (age 31)	(United States) Catholic University Cardinals	0	0
Defenders
2	William Yomby	(Cameroon)	CB	2009	June 18, 1981 (age 45)	Puerto Rico Islanders	216	9
3	Austin Yearwood	(United States)	LB	2018	August 12, 1994 (age 32)	(United States) Charlotte Independence	0	0
5	Conor Shanosky	(United States)	CB	2016	December 13, 1991 (age 34)	(United States) Louisville City	52	4
10	Scott Thomsen	(United States)	LB	2018	December 31, 1993 (age 32)	(United States) Orlando City B	0	0
15	Mallan Roberts	(Canada)	CB	2017	June 6, 1992 (age 34)	(Canada) FC Edmonton	30	1
18	Alex Lee	(Guam)	RB	2013	January 15, 1990 (age 36)	(United States) FC Dallas	103	2
31	Braeden Troyer	(United States)	LB	2015	March 19, 1993 (age 33)	(United States) South Carolina Gamecocks	83	0
55	Mekeil Williams	(Trinidad and Tobago)	RB	2018	July 24, 1990 (age 36)	(United States) Colorado Rapids	0	0
Midfielders
4	Fred Sekyere	(Ghana)	LM	2015	March 31, 1986 (age 40)	(United States) Charlotte Eagles	79	3
7	Neil Hlavaty	(United States)	AM	2018	December 27, 1986 (age 39)	(United States) Myrtle Beach Mutiny	0	0
8	Finnlay Wyatt	(England)	LM	2017	January 18, 1995 (age 31)	(United States) Longwood Lancers	11	0
11	Matt Bolduc	(United States)	RM	2017	October 12, 1994 (age 32)	(United States) Harrisburg City Islanders	14	2
12	Evan Lee	(United States)	DM	2017	November 23, 1993 (age 32)	(United States) Ohio Wesleyan Battling Bishops	14	0
14	Yudai Imura	(Japan)	AM	2015	June 25, 1991 (age 35)	(Japan) Tokyo Musashino City	67	13
17	Oscar Umar	(Ghana)	CM	2017	February 20, 1993 (age 33)	(United States) West Chester United	14	0
24	Koby Osei-Wusu	(United States)	CM	2018	December 26, 1995 (age 30)	(United States) George Washington Colonials	0	0
25	Brandon Eaton	(United States)	CM	2017	October 31, 1994 (age 32)	(United States) VCU Rams	1	0
27	Raul Gonzalez	(United States)	RM	2017	September 23, 1994 (age 32)	(United States) Memphis Tigers	24	2
42	Sam Bacon	(United States)	CM	2018	July 3, 1999 (age 27)	(United States) Richmond Strikers	0	0
Forwards
16	Heviel Cordovés	(Cuba)	ST	2018	November 10, 1989 (age 36)	(United States) Charleston Battery	0	0
21	Brian Shriver	(United States)	ST	2018	August 5, 1987 (age 39)	(United States) Jacksonville Armada	0	0
29	Dane Kelly	(Jamaica)	ST	2018	February 9, 1991 (age 35)	(United States) D.C. United (loan)	0	0
32	Bruno Miranda	(Bolivia)	ST	2018	February 10, 1998 (age 28)	(United States) D.C. United (loan)	0	0
71	Luiz Fernando	(Brazil)	RW	2016	June 23, 1997 (age 29)	(Brazil) Flamengo	50	3
92	Giuseppe Gentile	(United States)	ST	2018	October 18, 1992 (age 34)	Puerto Rico FC	0	0

== Transfers ==
=== In ===
No.	Pos.	Player	Transferred from	Fee	Date	Source
16	FW	(Cuba) Heviel Cordovés	(United States) Charleston Battery	Free	December 4, 2017	
3	DF	(United States) Austin Yearwood	(United States) Charlotte Independence	Free	December 15, 2017	
21	FW	(United States) Brian Shriver	(United States) Jacksonville Armada	Free	January 11, 2018	
92	FW	(United States) Giuseppe Gentile	Puerto Rico FC	Feee	January 23, 2018	
42	MF	(United States) Sam Bacon	(United States) Richmond Strikers	Academy signee	February 7, 2018	
45	GK	(United States) Kent Dickey	(United States) Richmond Strikers	Academy signee	February 7, 2018	
55	DF	(Trinidad and Tobago) Mekeil Williams	(United States) Colorado Rapids	Free	February 16, 2018	
1	GK	(United States) Trevor Spangenberg	Puerto Rico FC	Free	February 28, 2018	
7	MF	(United States) Neil Hlavaty	(United States) Myrtle Beach Mutiny	Free	March 12, 2018	
10	DF	(United States) Scott Thomsen	(United States) Orlando City B	Free	March 12, 2018	
24	MF	(Ghana) Koby Osei-Wusu	(United States) George Washington Colonials	Free	March 12, 2018	
28	MF	(United States) Greg Boehme	(United States) VCU Rams	Free	April 13, 2018	
	GK	(United States) Eric Klenofsky	(United States) D.C. United	Free	June 1, 2018	

=== Out ===
No.	Pos.	Player	Transferred to	Fee	Date	Source
42	MF	(United States) Simon Fitch	(United States) George Washington Colonials	Free	August 1, 2017	
1	GK	(Canada) Marcel DeBellis		Free	October 31, 2017	
7	MF	(Brazil) Oliver	(Australia) South Melbourne	Free	October 31, 2017	
10	FW	(Lesotho) Sunny Jane	(Cambodia) Phnom Penh Crown	Free	October 31, 2017	
16	MF	(Republic of Ireland) Patrick McCann		Free	October 31, 2017	
20	FW	(United States) Mikey Minutillo		Free	October 31, 2017	
22	GK	(United States) Alex Wimmer		Free	October 31, 2017	
24	MF	(United States) Jackson Eskay		Free	October 31, 2017	
28	MF	(Ghana) Samuel Asante		Free	October 31, 2017	
35	MF	(United States) Brandon Eaton		Free	October 31, 2017	
70	FW	(Cameroon) Franck Tayou	(United States) FC Wichita	Free	October 31, 2017	

=== Loan in ===
No.	Pos.	Player	Loaned from	Start	End	Source
29	FW	(Jamaica) Dane Kelly	(United States) D.C. United	March 15, 2018	October 31, 2018	
32	FW	(Bolivia) Bruno Miranda	Universidad de Chile	March 15, 2018	October 31, 2018	
48	GK	(United States) Travis Worra	(United States) D.C. United	March 15, 2018	October 31, 2018	

== Non-competitive ==
=== Preseason friendlies ===
February 25, 2018	Richmond Kickers	2–0	James Madison Dukes	Richmond, Virginia
	Gonzalez 46'; Shriver 84'	Report		Stadium: Ukrop Park; Attendance: 100

February 28, 2018	Richmond Kickers	1–2	William & Mary Tribe	Richmond, Virginia
	Gentile 88'		Goal	Stadium: Ukrop Park; Attendance: 100

March 3, 2018	VCU Rams	0–0 (a.e.t.)	Richmond Kickers	Richmond, Virginia
		Report		Stadium: Sports Backers Stadium; Attendance: 400

March 6, 2018	Richmond Kickers	3–0	Liberty Flames	Richmond, Virginia
	Shriver 22', 29'; Luiz Fernando 57'			Stadium: City Stadium

March 10, 2018	Richmond Kickers	1–0	Maryland Terrapins	Richmond, Virginia
	Cordovés 36'	Report		Stadium: City Stadium

=== Midseason friendlies ===
April 20, 2018	Maryland Terrapins	Not reported	Richmond Kickers	College Park, Maryland
11:00 EST		Report		Stadium: Ludwig Field

April 20, 2018	D.C. United	Not reported	Richmond Kickers	College Park, Maryland
14:00 EST				Stadium: Ludwig Field

July 25, 2018	Richmond Kickers (United States)	2–4	(Spain) Espanyol	Richmond, Virginia
19:00 EST	Shanosky 11'; Troyer 43'	Report	Iglesias 38'; Darder (yellow card) 40' (goal) 87'; Sánchez (yellow card) 54'; Puado 82', 90+1'	Stadium: City Stadium; Attendance: 7,356; Referee: J. C. Griggs

== Competitive ==
=== USL ===
==== Table ====
Pos	Team	Pld	W	D	L	GF	GA	GD	Pts
12	Tampa Bay Rowdies	34	11	8	15	44	44	0	41
13	Penn FC	34	9	10	15	38	47	−9	37
14	Atlanta United 2	34	7	10	17	37	72	−35	31
15	Richmond Kickers	34	6	4	24	30	80	−50	22
16	Toronto FC II	34	4	6	24	42	77	−35	18

Source: 2018 USL standings
Rules for classification: 1) total wins; 2) total goal differential; 3) total goals scored; 4) points earned against top four Conference finishers; 5) disciplinary points; 6) coin toss or drawing of lots

==== Results ====
March 18, 2018 1	Bethlehem Steel	4–1	Richmond Kickers	Bethlehem, Pennsylvania
14:00 EDT	Ayuk 24'; Jones 40'; Allen 64', 90'	Report	Umar 57'	Stadium: Goodman Stadium; Attendance: 3,284; Referee: Marcos DeOliveira

March 24, 2018 2	Richmond Kickers	0–1	Indy Eleven	Richmond, Virginia
17:00 EDT	Sekyere (yellow card) 88' (red card) 90'	Report	McInerney 41'; Matern (yellow card) 60'; Steinberger (yellow card) 68'; Ferreira (yellow card) 90'	Stadium: City Stadium; Attendance: 4,756; Referee: Matthew Franz

March 31, 2018 3	Richmond Kickers	2–1	North Carolina FC	Richmond, Virginia
17:00 EDT	Umar (yellow card) 41'; Imura 77' (pen.); Gonzalez 83'	Report	Rios 43'; Guillen (yellow card) 76'	Stadium: City Stadium; Attendance: 5,032; Referee: Sergii Demianchuk

April 7, 2018 4	Richmond Kickers	1–1	New York Red Bulls II	Richmond, Virginia
17:00 EDT	Shriver 17'; Thomsen (yellow card) 42'; Lee (yellow card) 67'	Report	Moreno (yellow card) 34'; Scarlett (yellow card) 57'; Aguinaga 69'	Stadium: City Stadium; Attendance: 2,061; Referee: Jonathan Bilinski

April 14, 2018 5	Louisville City FC	2–1	Richmond Kickers	Louisville, Kentucky
19:30 EDT	Smith 64' (pen.); Davis IV 90+'	Report	Shriver 18'; Cordovés (yellow card) 66'	Stadium: Louisville Slugger Field; Attendance: 6,009; Referee: Joshua Brooks

April 25, 2018 6	Richmond Kickers	2–1	Toronto FC II	Richmond, Virginia
19:00 EDT	Imura 11'; Onkony 55' (o.g.); Osei-Wusu (yellow card) 78'; Gentile (yellow card) 81'	Report	Daniels 9'	Stadium: City Stadium; Attendance: 2,623; Referee: Marcos de Oliveira

May 6, 2018 7	Bethlehem Steel	3–1	Richmond Kickers	Bethlehem, Pennsylvania
17:00 EDT	Real 29'; Moar 68'; Skundrich (yellow card) 72'; Nanco 83' (pen.)	Report	Cordovés 15' (yellow card) 36'; Yearwood (yellow card) 72'; Umar (yellow card) 79'; Lee (yellow card) 85'	Stadium: Goodman Stadium; Attendance: 2,116; Referee: Thomas Snyder

May 12, 2018 8	Richmond Kickers	1–0	Tampa Bay Rowdies	Richmond, Virginia
19:00 EDT	Kelly 38'; Shanosky (yellow card) 90'	Report	Hristov (yellow card) 35'; Lachowecki (yellow card) 65'; Rozeboom (yellow card) 90'	Stadium: City Stadium; Attendance: 5,860; Referee: Lorant Varga

May 26, 2018 9	Richmond Kickers	1–3	Charlotte Independence	Richmond, Virginia
19:00 EDT	Shriver 80'	Report	Ekra 14'; Cato 45', 76'; Johnson (yellow card) 90'	Stadium: City Stadium; Attendance: 3,867; Referee: Sergii Demianchuk

June 2, 2018 10	Richmond Kickers	1–2	Pittsburgh Riverhounds	Richmond, Virginia
19:00 EDT	Williams (yellow card) 21'; Luiz Fernando 54'; Sekyere (yellow card) 85'; Umar (red card) 86'	Report	Dover (yellow card) 41'; Brett 72'; Kerr (yellow card) 75'; Parkes 79'	Stadium: City Stadium; Attendance: 2,451; Referee: Lukasz Szpala

June 9, 2018 11	Richmond Kickers	2–0	Charleston Battery	Richmond, Virginia
19:00 EDT	Cordovés (yellow card) 5' (goal) 63'; Luiz Fernando 90'	Report	Bolt (yellow card) 73'; Svantesson (yellow card) 86'	Stadium: City Stadium; Attendance: 3,441; Referee: Matt Franz

June 12, 2018 12	Penn FC	2–1	Richmond Kickers	Harrisburg, Pennsylvania
19:00 EDT	Bond (yellow card) 45'; Osae (yellow card) 52' (goal) 56'; Tiago (yellow card) 62'; Metzger 86'	Report	Worra (yellow card) 52'; Umar (yellow card) 74'; Williams (yellow card) 90+1'; Cordovés 90+4'	Stadium: FNB Field; Attendance: 2,114; Referee: Kevin Broadley

June 16, 2018 13	FC Cincinnati	4–0	Richmond Kickers	Cincinnati, Ohio
19:30 EDT	Ledesma 8', 67'; Albadawi 36'; König 60'; Welshman (yellow card) 82'; Keinan (yellow card) 90+2'	Report	Cordovés (yellow card) 33'; Williams (yellow card) 90'	Stadium: Nippert Stadium; Attendance: 28,026; Referee: Elvis Osmanovic

June 23, 2018 14	Richmond Kickers	1–1	Charlotte Independence	Richmond, Virginia
19:00 EDT	Shriver 6'	Report	Cato 20'; George (yellow card) 63'	Stadium: City Stadium; Attendance: 5,365; Referee: Javier Santos Escobar
Note: Leigh Cowlishaw's final match as manager.

June 30, 2018 15	Richmond Kickers	1–3	North Carolina FC	Richmond, Virginia
19:00 EDT	Cordovés 4'; Worra (yellow card) 90'	Report	Umar 59' (o.g.); da Luz 62'; Ewolo 90' (pen.)	Stadium: City Stadium; Attendance: 5,137; Referee: Eric Tattersall
Note: David Bulow's first match as manager.

July 9, 2018 16	Penn FC	1–2	Richmond Kickers	Harrisburg, Pennsylvania
19:00 EDT	Franco (yellow card) 38'; Mkosana 77' (pen.); Metzger (yellow card) 87'	Report	Thomsen 32' (yellow card) 59'; Worra (yellow card) 69'; Luiz Fernando 74' (yellow card) 85'	Stadium: FNB Field; Attendance: 2,124; Referee: Nicked Fateh

July 13, 2018 17	New York Red Bulls II	5–1	Richmond Kickers	Montclair, New Jersey
19:00 EDT	Stroud 2', 14', 68'; Moreno 34'; Cásseres Jr. (yellow card) 53'; Louro (yellow card) 56' (yellow-red card); White 60'	Report	Sekyere (yellow card) 46'; Lee (yellow card) 56'; Shriver 76'; Troyer (yellow card) 90'	Stadium: MSU Soccer Park at Pittser Field; Attendance: 614; Referee: Lorant Varga

July 21, 2018 18	Richmond Kickers	1–1	Atlanta United 2	Richmond, Virginia
19:00 EDT	Shriver 38'; Boehme (yellow card) 45'; Thomsen (yellow card) 50'	Report	Kendall-Moullin (yellow card) 15'; Metcalf (yellow card) 32'; Gallagher 67'; Kissiedou (yellow card) 90'	Stadium: City Stadium; Attendance: 2,956; Referee: Bardhyl Pashaj

July 28, 2018 19	Charleston Battery	3–0	Richmond Kickers	Charleston, South Carolina
19:00 EDT	Rittmeyer 15', 45'; Guerra 51'	Report		Stadium: MUSC Health Stadium; Attendance: 3,221; Referee: Sergii Demianchuk

August 1, 2018 20	Pittsburgh Riverhounds	3–0	Richmond Kickers	Pittsburgh, Pennsylvania
19:00 EDT	Brett 5', 69'; Zemanski (yellow card) 42'; Lubahn (yellow card) 49'; Pratzner (yellow card) 58'; Fitzpatrick 81'	Report	Bolduc (yellow card) 62'; Williams (yellow card) 84'	Stadium: Highmark Stadium; Attendance: 2,138; Referee: Charles Murphy

August 4, 2018 21	Richmond Kickers	0–3	Bethlehem Steel	Richmond, Virginia
19:00 EDT	Troyer (yellow card) 48'	Report	Real (yellow card) 18'; Mahoney (yellow card) 45'; Moar 54'; Holness 77'; Ngalina 85'	Stadium: City Stadium; Attendance: 3,254; Referee: Jose Lara

August 12, 2018 22	Toronto FC II	1–0	Richmond Kickers	Toronto, Ontario
19:30 EDT	Bjornethun (yellow card) 2'; Hamilton 48'; Srbely (yellow card) 85'	Report	Gonzalez (yellow card) 39'; Roberts (yellow card) 60'	Stadium: BMO Field; Attendance: 696; Referee: David Barrie

August 15, 2018 23	Ottawa Fury FC	2–0	Richmond Kickers	Ottawa, Ontario
19:00 EDT	Haworth 8'; Portilla (yellow card) 41'; Taylor 84'	Report		Stadium: TD Place Stadium; Attendance: 3,535; Referee: Matt Souare

August 18, 2018 24	Richmond Kickers	3–2	Penn FC	Richmond, Virginia
19:00 EDT	Spangenberg (yellow card) 24'; Shriver 27' (pen.); Cordovés 30', (yellow card) 45+1'; Lee (yellow card) 54'; Sekyere 80'	Report	Mkosana 24' (pen.); Venter (yellow card) 26'; Ramírez 54' (pen.); Shaibu (yellow card) 85'	Stadium: City Stadium; Attendance: 5,376; Referee: Javier Santos Escobar

August 25, 2018 25	Richmond Kickers	0–6	Louisville City FC	Richmond, Virginia
19:00 EDT	Hlavaty (yellow card) 40'; Troyer (yellow card) 52'; Agyemang (yellow card) 56'; Nascimento (yellow card) 68'; Yearwood (yellow card) 87'	Report	Lancaster 33'; Davis IV 37'; Carranza 58'; McCabe 61'; Spencer 78', 82'	Stadium: City Stadium; Attendance: 5,869; Referee: Eric Tattersall

August 28, 2018 26	Nashville SC	4–0	Richmond Kickers	Nashville, Tennessee
19:30 CDT/20:30 EDT	Hume 42', 60'; Bourgeois 48'; Davis (yellow card) 55'; LaGrassa 57'	Report		Stadium: First Tennessee Park; Attendance: 8,651; Referee: Marcos de Oliveira

September 1, 2018 27	Indy Eleven	1–1	Richmond Kickers	Indianapolis, Indiana
19:00 EDT	Mares 14'; Reiner (yellow card) 81'	Report	Gonzalez 5', (yellow card) 69'; Williams (yellow card) 82'; Agyemang (yellow card) 90+3'	Stadium: Lucas Oil Stadium; Attendance: 11,344; Referee: Victor Rivas

September 8, 2018 28	Charlotte Independence	2–1	Richmond Kickers	Matthews, North Carolina
19:00 EDT	Zayed 5'; Areman 58'	Report	Gonzalez 72'; Nascimento (yellow card) 83'	Stadium: Sportsplex at Matthews; Attendance: 1,175; Referee: Greg Dopka

September 15, 2018 29	Richmond Kickers	0–2	Ottawa Fury	Richmond, Virginia
19:00 EDT	Roberts (yellow card) 83'	Report	Roberts 10' (o.g.); Haworth 38'	Stadium: City Stadium; Attendance: 2,369; Referee: Thomas Snyder

September 22, 2018 30	Tampa Bay Rowdies	3–0	Richmond Kickers	St. Petersburg, Florida
19:30 EDT	Gorskie 49' (Hristov); Chavez 57' (Taku), (yellow card) 58'; Flemmings 90+3' (Cole)	Report	Umar (yellow card) 9'; Hlavaty (yellow card) 18'; Williams (yellow card) 87'	Stadium: Al Lang Stadium; Attendance: 6,472; Referee: Lukas Szpala

September 26, 2018 31	Richmond Kickers	1–4	FC Cincinnati	Richmond, Virginia
19:00 EDT	Eaton (yellow card) 14'; Cordovés 32'; Luiz Fernando (yellow card) 50'; Sekyere (yellow card) 72'; Shanosky (yellow card) 85'	Report	Albadawi 16'; Ledesma 40', 44', (yellow card) 45+3'; Alashe (yellow card) 45+5'; Welshman 63'	Stadium: City Stadium; Attendance: 1,519; Referee: Nickrod Fateh

September 29, 2018 32	North Carolina FC	3–2	Richmond Kickers	Cary, North Carolina
19:00 EDT	Bekker 39', 73' da Luz 61'; Ríos (yellow card) 90+1'	Report	Cordovés (yellow card) 11', (goal) 44', (yellow card) 79' (red card); Agyemang 30'; Boehme (yellow card) 45+1'; Eaton (yellow card) 50'	Stadium: WakeMed Soccer Park; Attendance: 8,004; Referee: Kevin Broadley

October 6, 2018 33	Richmond Kickers	0–3	Nashville SC	Richmond, Virginia
19:00 EDT	Boehme (yellow card) 40'; Agyemang (yellow card) 81'; Gentile (yellow card) 90'	Report	Hume 20'; Reed 29'; Winn 56'	Stadium: City Stadium; Attendance: 5,659; Referee: Matt Franz

October 13, 2018 34	Atlanta United 2	3–2	Richmond Kickers	Lawrenceville, Georgia
19:00 EDT	Kunga 61', 69'; Shannon (yellow card) 65'; Sandoval 76'	Report	Gentile 80', 90+1'	Stadium: Coolray Field; Attendance: 3,334; Referee: Natalie Simon

=== U.S. Open Cup ===
May 16, 2018 Second round	Reading United (Pennsylvania)	1–1 (a.e.t.) (3–4 p)	(Virginia) Richmond Kickers	Reading, Pennsylvania
19:00 EDT	Bennett 70'; Campbell (yellow card) 81'	Report	Osei-Wusu 8'; Lee (yellow card) 68'; Bolduc (yellow card) 75'; Gonzalez (yellow card) 113'; Umar (red card) 115'	Stadium: Don Thomas Stadium; Referee: Brandon Smith
	Penalties
	Molloy (penalty scored); Krutzen (penalty scored); Lipinski (penalty missed); Maloney (penalty scored); Bennett (penalty missed)		(penalty scored) Imura; (penalty scored) Gonzalez; (penalty missed) Williams; (penalty scored) Cordovés; (penalty scored) Hlavaty

May 23, 2018 Third round	Richmond Kickers (Virginia)	3–2	(Pennsylvania) Penn FC	Richmond, Virginia
7:00 PM EDT	Luiz Fernando 13', 22'; Cordovés 83'	Report	Rivera 36', 60' (yellow card) 80'; De Sousa (yellow card) 62'	Stadium: City Stadium; Attendance: 1,957; Referee: JC Griggs

June 6, 2018 Fourth round	Philadelphia Union (Pennsylvania)	5–0	(Virginia) Richmond Kickers	Chester, Pennsylvania
TBD EDT	Elliott 3'; Accam 27' (pen.); Fontana 44'; Epps 45+2'; Simpson 49'; Rosenberry (yellow card) 88'	Report		Stadium: Talen Energy Stadium; Attendance: 3,565

== Statistics ==
=== Appearances and goals ===
As of July 30, 2018

No.	Pos	Nat	Player	Total		USL		USL Cup		U.S. Open Cup	
No.	Pos	Nat	Player	Apps	Goals	Apps	Goals	Apps	Goals	Apps	Goals
1	GK	(United States) USA	Trevor Spangenberg	6	0	4+0	0	0+0	0	2+0	0
2	DF	(Cameroon) CMR	William Yomby	7	0	2+5	0	0+0	0	0+0	0
3	DF	(United States) USA	Austin Yearwood	14	0	11+0	0	0+0	0	3+0	0
4	MF	(Ghana) GHA	Fred Sekyere	9	0	2+6	0	0+0	0	0+1	0
5	DF	(United States) USA	Conor Shanosky	20	0	17+0	0	0+0	0	2+1	0
7	MF	(Czech Republic) CZE	Neil Hlavaty	10	0	6+1	0	0+0	0	2+1	0
8	MF	(England) ENG	Finnlay Wyatt	2	0	0+2	0	0+0	0	0+0	0
10	DF	(United States) USA	Scott Thomsen	12	1	10+1	1	0+0	0	1+0	0
11	MF	(United States) USA	Matt Bolduc	8	0	2+4	0	0+0	0	2+0	0
12	DF	(United States) USA	Evan Lee	1	0	0+1	0	0+0	0	0+0	0
14	MF	(Japan) JPN	Yudai Imura	21	2	13+6	2	0+0	0	1+1	0
15	MF	(Canada) CAN	Mallan Roberts	0	0	0+0	0	0+0	0	0+0	0
16	FW	(Cuba) CUB	Heviel Cordovés	17	5	10+5	4	0+0	0	1+1	1
17	MF	(Ghana) GHA	Oscar Umar	15	1	12+1	1	0+0	0	2+0	0
18	DF	(Guam) GUM	Alex Lee	17	0	14+0	0	0+0	0	3+0	0
21	FW	(United States) USA	Brian Shriver	21	6	18+1	6	0+0	0	1+1	0
24	MF	(Ghana) GHA	Koby Osei-Wusu	17	1	10+4	0	0+0	0	2+1	1
26	MF	(United States) USA	Brandon Eaton	4	0	2+0	0	0+0	0	1+1	0
27	MF	(United States) USA	Raul Gonzalez	20	1	14+3	1	0+0	0	2+1	0
28	MF	(United States) USA	Greg Boehme	3	0	2+1	0	0+0	0	0+0	0
29	FW	(Jamaica) JAM	Dane Kelly	4	1	3+1	1	0+0	0	0+0	0
31	DF	(United States) USA	Braeden Troyer	20	0	18+0	0	0+0	0	2+0	0
32	FW	(Bolivia) BOL	Bruno Miranda	1	0	0+1	0	0+0	0	0+0	0
42	DF	(United States) USA	Sam Bacon	0	0	0+0	0	0+0	0	0+0	0
45	GK	(United States) USA	Kent Dickey	0	0	0+0	0	0+0	0	0+0	0
48	GK	(United States) USA	Travis Worra	15	0	15+0	0	0+0	0	0+0	0
50	GK	(United States) USA	Zachery Tashjy	0	0	0+0	0	0+0	0	0+0	0
55	DF	(Trinidad and Tobago) TTO	Mekeil Williams	19	0	14+2	0	0+0	0	3+0	0
71	FW	(Brazil) BRA	Luiz Fernando Nascimento	17	5	8+7	3	0+0	0	2+0	2
92	FW	(Italy) ITA	Giuseppe Gentile	6	0	2+4	0	0+0	0	0+0	0

=== Top scorers ===
As of June 10, 2018

No.	Pos.	Player	USL	USL Cup	U.S. Open Cup	TOTAL
71	MF	(Brazil) Luiz Fernando Nascimento	2	0	2	4
21	FW	(United States) Brian Shriver	3	0	0	3
16	FW	(Cuba) Heviel Cordovés	2	0	1	3
14	MF	(Japan) Yudai Imura	2	0	0	2
17	MF	(Ghana) Oscar Umar	1	0	0	1
24	MF	(United States) Koby Osei-Wusu	0	0	1	1
27	MF	(United States) Raul Gonzalez	1	0	0	1
29	FW	(Jamaica) Dane Kelly	1	0	0	1
Own Goals			1	0	0	1
Totals			10	0	4	14

== Awards ==
=== USL Team of the Week ===
Week	Player	Pos.	Ref.
3	Brian Shriver	MF	

== See also ==
- Richmond Kickers
- 2018 in American soccer
- 2018 USL season
