= 2005 in American soccer =

Soccer in the United States
- Season: 2005

Men's soccer
- Supporters' Shield: San Jose Earthquakes
- MLS Cup: Los Angeles Galaxy

The 2005 season was the 93rd year of competitive soccer in the United States.

== National team ==
Wins	Losses	Draws
14	3	3

The home team or the team that is designated as the home team is listed in the left column; the away team is in the right column.

Win Draw Loss

February 9 World Cup Qualifying 3rd Round	Trinidad and Tobago	1 – 2	United States	Port of Spain, Trinidad & Tobago
15:30 UTC−04	Eve 89'	(Report)	Johnson 30'; Lewis 54'	Stadium: Queen's Park Oval; Attendance: 11,000; Referee: Benito Archundia (Mexico)

March 9 International Friendly	United States	3 – 0	Colombia	Fullerton, California
	Noonan 25'; Marshall 33' Mathis 66'			Stadium: Titan Stadium; Attendance: 7,086; Referee: Marco Antonio Rodriguez (Mexico)

March 19 International Friendly	United States	1 – 0	Honduras	Albuquerque, New Mexico
14:00 UTC−07	Johnson 45'	(Report)		Stadium: University Stadium; Attendance: 9,222; Referee: Mauricio Navarro (Canada)

March 27 World Cup Qualifying 3rd Round	Mexico	2 – 1	United States	Mexico City, Mexico
12:00 UTC−06	Borgetti 32'; Naelson 35'	(Report)	Lewis 59'	Stadium: Estadio Azteca; Attendance: 110,000; Referee: Rodolfo Sibrian (El Salvador)

March 30 World Cup Qualifying 3rd Round	United States	2 – 0	Guatemala	Birmingham, Alabama
19:00 UTC−06	Johnson 11'; Ralston 71'	(Report)		Stadium: Legion Field; Attendance: 31,624; Referee: Ramesh Ramdhan (Trinidad & Tobago)

May 28 International Friendly	United States	1 – 2	England	Chicago, Illinois
14:06 UTC−05	Dempsey 79'	(Report)	Richardson 4', 44'	Stadium: Soldier Field; Attendance: 45,000; Referee: Benito Archundia (Mexico)

June 4 World Cup Qualifying 3rd Round	United States	3 – 0	Costa Rica	Salt Lake City, Utah
17:30 UTC−06	Donovan 6', 62'; McBride 87'	(Report)		Stadium: Rice-Eccles Stadium; Attendance: 40,586; Referee: Carlos Batres (Guatemala)

June 8 World Cup Qualifying 3rd Round	Panama	0 – 3	United States	Panama City, Panama
21:30 UTC−04		(Report)	Bocanegra 6'; Donovan 20'; McBride 40'	Stadium: Estadio Rommel Fernández; Attendance: 17,000; Referee: Mauricio Navarro (Canada)

July 7 Gold Cup Group Stage	Cuba	1 – 4	United States	Seattle, Washington
19:30 UTC−07	Moré 18'	(Report)	Dempsey 45'; Donovan 20', 90'; Beasley 89'	Stadium: Qwest Field; Attendance: 15,831; Referee: José Pineda (Honduras)

July 9 Gold Cup Group Stage	United States	2 – 0	Canada	Seattle, Washington
12:30 UTC−07	Hutchinson 48' (o.g.); Donovan 90'	(Report)		Stadium: Qwest Field; Attendance: 15,109; Referee: Neal Brizan (Trinidad & Tobago)

July 12 Gold Cup Group Stage	United States	0 – 0	Costa Rica	Foxborough, Massachusetts
19:30 UTC−04		(Report)		Stadium: Gillette Stadium; Attendance: 15,211; Referee: Benito Archundia (Mexico)

July 16 Gold Cup Quarterfinals	United States	3 – 1	Jamaica	Foxborough, Massachusetts
19:30 UTC−04	Wolff 6'; Beasley 42', 83'	(Report)	Fuller 88'	Stadium: Gillette Stadium; Attendance: 22,108; Referee: Carlos Batres (Guatemala)

July 21 Gold Cup Semifinals	Honduras	1 – 2	United States	East Rutherford, New Jersey
18:00 UTC−04	Guerrero 31'	(Report)	O'Brien 86'; Onyewu 90'	Stadium: Giants Stadium; Attendance: 41,721; Referee: Peter Prendergast (Jamaica)

July 24 Gold Cup Final	United States	0 – 0 (a.e.t.) (3 – 1 p)	Panama	East Rutherford, New Jersey
15:00 UTC−04		(Report)		Stadium: Giants Stadium; Attendance: 31,018; Referee: Carlos Batres (Guatemala)
	Penalties
	Quaranta (penalty scored); Armas (penalty missed); Donovan (penalty scored); Davis (penalty scored)		Tejada (penalty missed); Valdés (penalty missed); Baloy (penalty scored); Blanco (penalty missed)

August 17 World Cup Qualifying 3rd Round	United States	1 – 0	Trinidad and Tobago	East Hartford, Connecticut
20:00 UTC−04	McBride 3'	(Report)		Stadium: Rentschler Field; Attendance: 25,488; Referee: Marco Antonio Rodríguez (Mexico)

September 3 World Cup Qualifying 3rd Round	United States	2 – 0	Mexico	Columbus, Ohio
19:30 UTC−04	Ralston 55'; Beasley 62'	(Report)		Stadium: Columbus Crew Stadium; Attendance: 24,685; Referee: Carlos Batres (Guatemala)

September 7 World Cup Qualifying 3rd Round	Guatemala	0 – 0	United States	Guatemala City, Guatemala
21:00 UTC−06		(Report)		Stadium: Estadio Mateo Flores; Attendance: 27,000; Referee: Marco Antonio Rodríguez (Mexico)

October 8 World Cup Qualifying 3rd Round	Costa Rica	3 – 0	United States	San José, Costa Rica
14:00 UTC−06	Wanchope 32'; Hernández 60', 87'	(Report)		Stadium: Estadio Ricardo Saprissa; Attendance: 30,000; Referee: Benito Archundia (Mexico)

October 12 World Cup Qualifying 3rd Round	United States	2 – 0	Panama	Foxborough, Massachusetts
18:58 UTC−04	Martino 53'; Twellman 59'	(Report)		Stadium: Gillette Stadium; Attendance: 9,192; Referee: Gilberto Alcalá (Mexico)

November 12 International Friendly	Scotland	1 – 1	United States	Glasgow, Scotland
16:00 UTC−0	Webster 37'	(Report)	Wolff 9' (pen.)	Stadium: Hampden Park; Attendance: 9,192; Referee: Alberto Undiano Mallenco (Spain)

== Major League Soccer ==
=== Standings ===
Position	Eastern Conference	Points	Played	Wins	Losses	Ties	Goals	Against	Difference	Average attendance
1	New England Revolution	59	32	17	7	8	55	37	+18	12,525
2	D.C. United	54	32	16	10	6	58	37	+21	16,664
3	Chicago Fire	49	32	15	13	4	49	50	-1	17,238
4	MetroStars	47	32	12	9	11	53	49	+4	15,077
5	Kansas City Wizards	45	32	11	9	12	52	44	+8	9,691
6	Columbus Crew	38	32	11	16	5	34	45	-11	12,916
Position	Western Conference	Points	Played	Wins	Losses	Ties	Goals	Against	Difference	Average attendance
1	San Jose Earthquakes	64	32	18	4	10	53	31	+22	13,037
2	FC Dallas	48	32	13	10	9	52	44	+8	11,189
3	Colorado Rapids	45	32	13	13	6	40	37	+3	13,638
4	Los Angeles Galaxy	45	32	13	13	6	44	45	-1	24,204
5	Real Salt Lake	20	32	5	22	5	30	65	-35	18,037
6	Chivas USA	18	32	4	22	6	31	67	-36	17,080

=== Playoffs ===
Conference Semifinals
E1	New England Revolution	0	3
E4	MetroStars	1	1
Eastern Conference
E3	Chicago	0	4
E2	D.C. United	0	0
W1	San Jose Earthquakes	1	1
W4	Los Angeles Galaxy	3	1
Western Conference
W3	Colorado Rapids (a.e.t.)	0	2(5)
W2	FC Dallas	0	2(4)

Conference Finals
E1	New England Revolution	1
E3	Chicago Fire	0
W4	Los Angeles Galaxy	2
W3	Colorado Rapids	0

MLS Cup 2005
E1	New England Revolution	0
W4	Los Angeles Galaxy	1

=== MLS Cup ===
November 13
15:30 UTC−06

New England Revolution	0 – 1 (a.e.t.)	Los Angeles Galaxy
	(Report)	Ramírez 105'

Pizza Hut Park, Frisco, Texas
Attendance: 21,193

== USL First Division ==
=== Standings ===
Place	Team	P	W	L	T	GF	GA	Points
1	Montreal Impact	28	18	3	7	37	15	61
2	Rochester Raging Rhinos	28	15	7	6	45	27	51
3	Vancouver Whitecaps	28	12	7	9	37	15	45
4	Seattle Sounders	28	11	6	11	33	25	44
5	Portland Timbers	28	10	9	9	40	42	39
6	Richmond Kickers	28	10	9	9	28	30	39
7	Puerto Rico Islanders	28	10	10	8	46	43	38
8	Atlanta Silverbacks	28	10	15	3	40	52	33
9	Charleston Battery	28	9	14	5	27	36	32
10	Minnesota Thunder	28	7	11	10	37	42	31
11	Virginia Beach Mariners	28	7	14	7	26	39	28
12	Toronto Lynx	28	3	17	8	26	50	17

=== Playoffs ===
Quarterfinals; September 15/17
4	Seattle Sounders	1-2-3
5	Portland Timbers	0-0-0
3	Vancouver Whitecaps	0-0-0(4)
6	Richmond Kickers (a.e.t)	0-0-0(5)

Semifinals; September 22/24
1	Montreal Impact	2-1-3
4	Seattle Sounders	2-2-4
2	Rochester Raging Rhinos	1-1-2
6	Richmond Kickers	3-1-4

Final; October 1
4	Seattle Sounders (a.e.t)	1(4)
6	Richmond Kickers	1(3)

=== Final ===
October 1
20:00 UTC−07

Seattle Sounders	1 – 1 (a.e.t.)	Richmond Kickers
Galindo 73'		Görres 24'
Penalties
Gregor (penalty scored); O'Brien (penalty scored); Levesque (penalty missed); Somoza (penalty missed); Graham (penalty missed); Saskuda (penalty scored); Jenkins (penalty scored)	4 – 3	(penalty missed) Delicate; (penalty missed) Ssejjemba; (penalty scored) Görres; (penalty scored) Williams; (penalty missed) Jeffrey; (penalty scored) Pauls; (penalty missed) Pascale

Qwest Field, Seattle
Attendance: 8,011

== USL Second Division ==
=== Standings ===
Purple indicates regular season champion
Green indicates playoff berth clinched

Place	Team	P	W	L	T	GF	GA	Points
1	Western Mass Pioneers	20	13	3	4	41	22	43
2	Charlotte Eagles	20	13	5	2	44	20	41
3	Harrisburg City Islanders	20	12	3	5	43	24	41
4	Wilmington Hammerheads	20	12	6	2	45	23	38
5	Cincinnati Kings	20	7	8	5	28	23	26
6	Long Island Rough Riders	20	7	13	0	29	42	21
7	Pittsburgh Riverhounds	20	6	11	3	32	25	21
8	New Hampshire Phantoms	20	6	11	3	29	38	21
9	Northern Virginia Royals	20	2	18	0	16	90	6

=== Playoffs ===
Semifinals 2-game aggregate

Semifinals; August 17/20
1	Western Mass Pioneers	0-3-3
4	Wilmington Hammerheads	1-1-2
3	Harrisburg City Islanders	1-1-2
2	Charlotte Eagles	0-2-2

Finals; August 27
1	Western Mass Pioneers	2(4)
2	Charlotte Eagles(a.e.t.)	2(5)

=== Final ===
August 27
19:30 UTC−04

Western Mass Pioneers	2 – 2 (a.e.t.)	Charlotte Eagles
McFarlane 43'; Fernandes 46'		Coggins 1'; Meek 90+2'
Penalties
	4 – 5

Lusitano Stadium, Ludlow, Massachusetts
Attendance: 4,722

== Lamar Hunt U.S. Open Cup ==
=== Bracket ===
Home teams listed on top of bracket

Third Round
USL1	Portland	2
USL1	Seattle	0
USL2	Charlotte	2
MLS	Chivas USA (AET)	3
USL1	Atlanta	1
PDL	Des Moines	5
USL1	Minnesota (AET)	6
MLS	Real Salt Lake	4
USL1	Richmond	8
PDL	Ocean City	4
MLS	FC Dallas (AET)	3
USL2	Wilmington	2
USL1	Rochester	2
USL1	Virginia Beach	1
USL2	Western Mass	1
MLS	Chicago	3

Fourth Round
USL1	Portland	0
MLS	San Jose	2
MLS	Chivas USA	2
MLS	Los Angeles	5
MLS	Kansas City	6
PDL	Des Moines	1
USL1	Minnesota	4
MLS	Colorado	1
USL1	Richmond	1
MLS	D.C. United	3
MLS	Columbus	1
MLS	FC Dallas (AET)	3
USL1	Rochester	3
MLS	MetroStars	1
MLS	New England	2
MLS	Chicago (AET)	3

Quarterfinals
MLS	San Jose	1
MLS	Los Angeles	2
MLS	Kansas City	1
USL1	Minnesota	3
MLS	D.C. United	1 (1)
MLS	FC Dallas (AET, PEN)	1 (4)
USL1	Rochester	1 (4)
MLS	Chicago (AET, PEN)	1 (5)

Semifinals
MLS	Los Angeles	5
USL1	Minnesota	2
MLS	FC Dallas	1
MLS	Chicago	0

Finals
MLS	Los Angeles	1
MLS	FC Dallas	0

=== Final ===
September 28
20:00 UTC−07

Los Angeles Galaxy	1 – 0	FC Dallas
Gomez 5'

Home Depot Center, Carson, California
Attendance: 10,000
Referee: Alex Prus

== American clubs in international competitions ==
Club	Competition	Final round
D.C. United	2005 CONCACAF Champions' Cup	Semifinals
Kansas City Wizards	2005 CONCACAF Champions' Cup	Quarterfinals

=== D.C. United ===
March 9 Champions Cup Quarterfinal	D.C. United (United States)	2 – 1	(Jamaica) Harbour View	Germantown, Maryland
	Eskandarian 5'; Gros 64'		Shelton 23'	Stadium: Maryland SoccerPlex; Attendance: 3,825

March 16 Champions Cup Quarterfinal	Harbour View (Jamaica)	1 – 2	(United States) D.C. United	Kingston, Jamaica
	Stewart 45'		Walker 74'; Moreno 77'	Stadium: Harbour View Stadium

April 6 Champions Cup Semifinal	D.C. United (United States)	1 – 1	(Mexico) UNAM	Washington, D.C.
	Gómez 10'		Aílton 51' (pen.)	Stadium: RFK Stadium; Attendance: 21,185

April 13 Champions Cup Semifinal	UNAM (Mexico)	5 – 0	(United States) D.C. United	Mexico City, Mexico
	Marioni 11'; Beltrán 48', 73'; Toledo 85'; Lozano 88'			Stadium: Estadio Olímpico Universitario; Attendance: 22,000

=== Kansas City Wizards ===
March 9 Champions Cup Quarterfinal	Kansas City Wizards (United States)	0 – 0	(Costa Rica) Deportivo Saprissa	Kansas City, Missouri
				Stadium: Arrowhead Stadium; Attendance: 1,207

March 16 Champions Cup Quarterfinal	Deportivo Saprissa (Costa Rica)	0 – 0 (a.e.t.)	(United States) Kansas City Wizards	San José, Costa Rica
	Drummond 90', 96'		Burciaga 79'	Stadium: Estadio Ricardo Saprissa
