= McColm =

McColm is both a surname and a given name. Notable people with the name include:

- Malcolm McColm (1914–1966), Australian politician
- Matt McColm (born 1965), American actor, stuntman, and model
- McColm Cephas (born 1978), Liberian footballer
