= Richmond Ivy SC =

Virginia soccer club

- Full name: Richmond Ivy Soccer Club
- Nickname: Ivy
- Founded: 2024
- Stadium: City Stadium (Richmond)
- Head Coach: Robert Ukrop
- League: USL W League
- Website: http://www.richmondivy.com
Home colors	Away colors

Ricmond Ivy SC is a pre-professional amateur women's soccer club based in Richmond, Virginia. Founded in 2024, the club fields a first team that plays in USL W League (USWL).

== History ==
=== Expansion ===
The United Soccer League announced on July 15, 2023, that Richmond would get an expansion team in the USL W League and be affiliated with the Richmond Kickers of the USL League One.

The Richmond Ivy Soccer Club was formed in 2024 under the ownership of 22 Holdings LLC a group that included former Richmond Kickers player Robert Ukrop as CEO and chairman and several other former Davidson College soccer players.

Former Richmond United and Richmond Strikers player Madeline McCraken was the club's first hire as the sporting director. On March 11, 2024, the team announced its name as the Ivy in honor of the ivy that grows around the city of Richmond. The club's inaugural game was a 1-0 win over the Virginia Maruaders in front of a sold-out crowd at City Stadium on May 11. The Ivy averaged 4,811 fans at home during their inaugural season. The Ivy were led by Kanna Matsuhisa in 2024 with 7 goals in 12 games.

=== Early years (2025–2026) ===
In 2025, former Virginia Commonwealth Universitt and George Mason standout Fred Sekyere was hired to be the new head coach. The Ivy once again won their season-opening match in front of a sold out crowd versus Virginia Beach. Olivia Woodson led the Ivy in their second season with 4 goals.

On April 1, 2026, it was announced the Ivy would host Portuguese women's soccer team Racing Power FC's United States-based squad in an exhibition match. On May 26, the Ivy announced that Rob Ukrop would take over as head coach for the 2026 season.

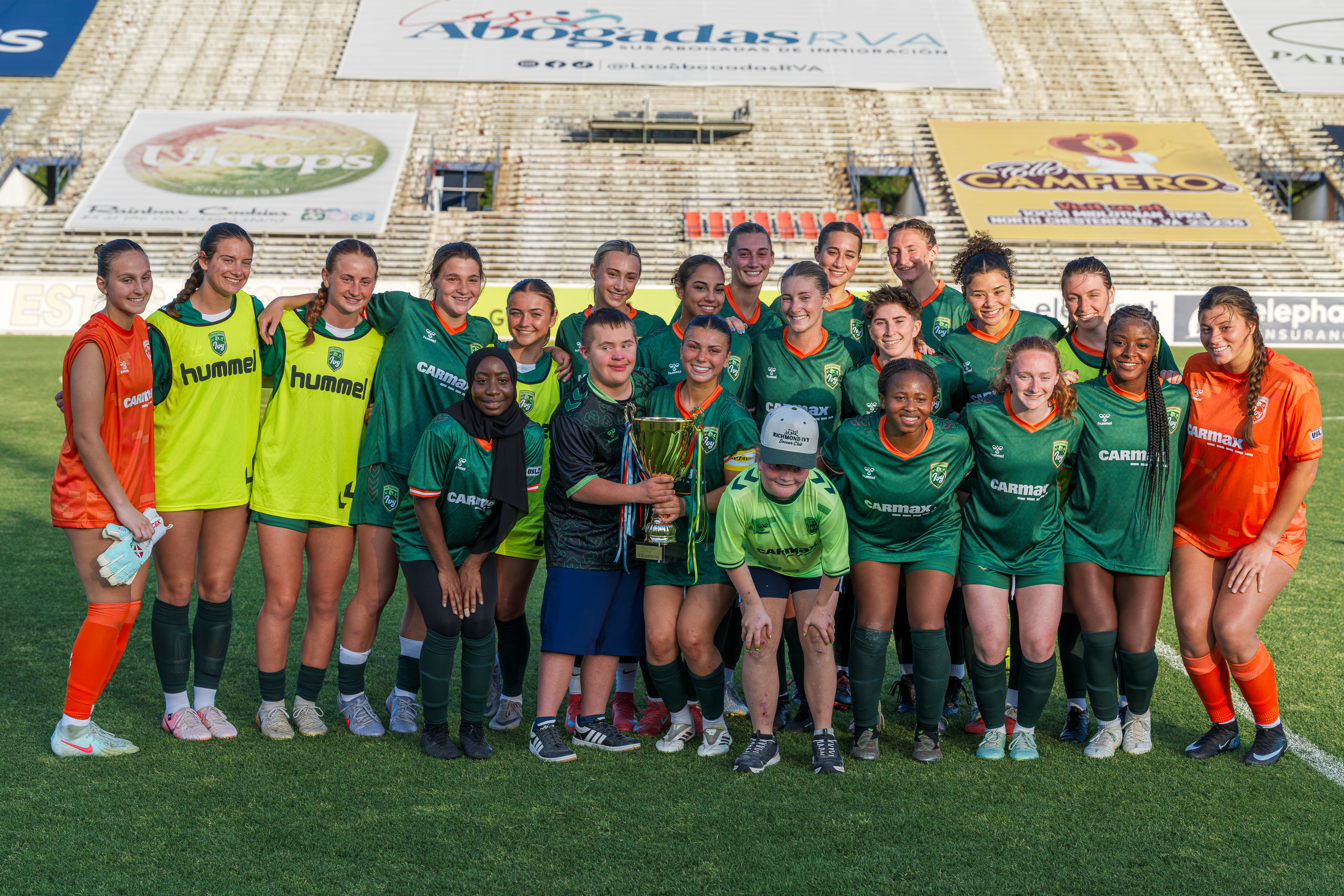
Ivy posing with the Kick It Forward Cup

The Ivy started the 2026 campaign with a 3-2 win over Lancaster Inferno FC in the inaugural Kick It Forward Cup Charity Match. Returning players Olivia Woodson, Maci Landel and Sunniyah Tucker scored. On Jun 17, 2026 they defeated Racing Power FC USA 1-1, 3-1 on penalty kicks in a friendly.

On July 24, 2026 the Ivy announced that Sporting Director Madeline McCracken departed the club.

== Players ==
=== 2026 Team ===
Final 2026 Roster

Note: Flags indicate national team as defined under FIFA eligibility rules; some limited exceptions apply. Players may hold more than one non-FIFA nationality.

No.	Pos.	Nation	Player
0	GK	USA	Logan Marks
1	GK	USA	Lauren Hargrove
2	DF	USA	Ella Stanley
4	DF	USA	Gianna Chrapek
5	MF	USA	Sophie Stroud
6	DF	USA	Taryn Chance
8	DF	USA	Mackenzie Fitzgerald
9	FW	USA	Jazmin Jackson
11	FW	USA	Sunniyah Tucker
12	DF	USA	Alexis Pierce
13	MF	USA	Jurnee Durrett-Finney
14	DF	USA	Naomi Knight
16	DF	USA	Kenley Campbell
17	DF	USA	Megan Dwyer

No.	Pos.	Nation	Player
18	MF	USA	Kiera McCloskey
19	FW	USA	Jill Flammia
20	DF	USA	Ava Lozada
21	DF	USA	Kate Weyer
22	FW	USA	Olivia Woodson
23	DF	USA	Dakota Brown
24	MF	USA	Emerson Moore
26	DF	USA	Molly Widderich
27	DF	USA	Georgia Skelton
28	FW	USA	Maci Landel
30	MF	USA	Madison Abi-Saab
34	DF	USA	Shaye Doherty
37	FW	USA	Lyla Charlet
38	MF	USA	Taylor Shell
39	DF	USA	Ava Marvin

=== Richmond United Training Players ===
Note: Flags indicate national team as defined under FIFA eligibility rules; some limited exceptions apply. Players may hold more than one non-FIFA nationality.

No.	Pos.	Nation	Player
25		USA	Alexis Newman
31		USA	Ava Martin
32		USA	Annabel Sharrer
33		USA	Molly Flammia

No.	Pos.	Nation	Player
35		USA	Aliya Cobb
36		USA	Meghan Pattern
44	GK	USA	Audra Sholtz
45	GK	USA	Ava Dodd

=== Notable former players ===
- (Jamaica) Kameron Simmonds: Richmond Ivy (2024–2025) Utah Royals
- (United States) Camryn Miller: Richmond Ivy (2025) Bay FC
- (Japan) Kanna Matsuhisa: Richmond Ivy (2024) Kolbotn IL

== Team standings and statistics ==
Season	League										Position		Playoffs	Other	Average attendance (Note: Average attendance only includes statistics from regular season matches.)	Top goalscorer(s) (Note: Top goalscorer(s) includes all goals scored in the regular season.)	
Season	League	Pld	W	L	D	GF	GA	GD	Pts	PPG	Conf.	Overall	Playoffs	Other	Average attendance	Name(s)	Goals
2026	USLW	10	4	3	3	17	13	4	15	1.5	Chesapeake Division	4	did not qualify	did not qualify	4,022	(United States) Jill Flammia	4
2025	USLW	10	4	3	3	17	10	7	15	1.5	Chesapeake Division	4	did not qualify	did not qualify	4,272	(United States) Olivia Woodson	4
2024	USLW	12	6	5	1	24	18	6	19	1.58	Mid-Atlantic Division	4	did not qualify	did not qualify	4,811	(Japan) Kanna Matsuhisa	7

== Coaching staff ==
- Rob Ukrop, Head Coach (2026–present)
- Mac Phillips, Assistant Coach (2026–present)
- Carter Yeisley, Assistant Coach (2025–present)

=== Past ===
- Fred Sekyere, Head Coach (2025)
- Kimmy Cummings, Head Coach (2024)

== Home stadiums ==
- City Stadium (Richmond) (2024-present)
