= Justin Lee (footballer) =

Guamanian footballer

Personal information
- Full name: Justin David Wei Hung Lee
- Date of birth: January 15, 1990 (age 36)
- Place of birth: Rockville, Maryland, United States
- Height: 1.78 m (5 ft 10 in)
- Position: Defender

Youth career
- Potomac Cougars

College career
Years	Team	Apps	(Gls)
2008–2011	Penn State Nittany Lions	85	(2)

International career^{‡}
2015–	Guam	18	(1)
- ‡ National team caps and goals as of 10:20, 13 June 2021 (UTC)

Justin David Wei Hung Lee (born January 15, 1990) is an American-Guamanian football player who plays as a midfielder and defender.

== College career ==
Lee was a four-year starter at Penn State University, making 85 appearances and scoring two goals.

== International career ==
Despite being born in Maryland in the United States, Lee chose to represent Guam at international level, as he is eligible through his grandmother. He made his senior debut in a 0–1 defeat by Hong Kong in 2015. He scored his first goal in a 3–2 friendly defeat by Chinese Taipei.

== Personal life ==
Lee has two brothers; a twin, Alex and a younger brother, Nate, who have both also represented Guam at international level. All three made their debut in the same game against Hong Kong.

== International statistics ==
As of matches played November 19, 2019.

National team	Year	Apps	Goals
Guam	2015	8	0
Guam	2016	5	1
Guam	2017	0	0
Guam	2018	1	0
Guam	2019	3	0
Total		17	1

=== International goals ===
Scores and results list Guam's goal tally first.

No	Date	Venue	Opponent	Score	Result	Competition
1.	19 March 2016	Taipei Municipal Stadium, Tapei, Taiwan	Chinese Taipei	1–1	2–3	Friendly
