= Nate Lee (footballer) =

Association soccer player

Personal information
- Full name: Nathaniel Prescott Wei Wah Lee
- Date of birth: May 6, 1994 (age 32)
- Place of birth: Derwood, Maryland, United States
- Height: 1.80 m (5 ft 11 in)
- Position: Defender

Youth career
- Bethesda Real

College career
Years	Team	Apps	(Gls)
2013–2015	Penn State Nittany Lions	30	(0)
2016	High Point Panthers	6	(0)

International career^{‡}
2015–	Guam	11	(0)
- ‡ National team caps and goals as of 13 June 2021

Nathaniel Prescott Wei Wah Lee (born May 6, 1994) is a soccer player who plays as a defender. Born in the United States, he represents the Guam national team.

== College career ==
After graduating from the Pennsylvania State University in 2015, Lee enrolled at the High Point University in 2016.

== International career ==
Despite being born in Maryland in the United States, Lee chose to represent Guam at international level, as he is eligible through his grandmother. He made his senior debut in a 0–1 defeat by Hong Kong in 2015.

== Personal life ==
Lee has two brothers, Alex and Justin, who have both also represented Guam at international level. All three made their debut in the same game against Hong Kong.

== International statistics ==
As of matches played 20 April 2017.

National team	Year	Apps	Goals
Guam	2015	2	0
Guam	2016	2	0
Total		4	0
