= Raúl González (footballer, born 1994) =

Puerto Rican footballer

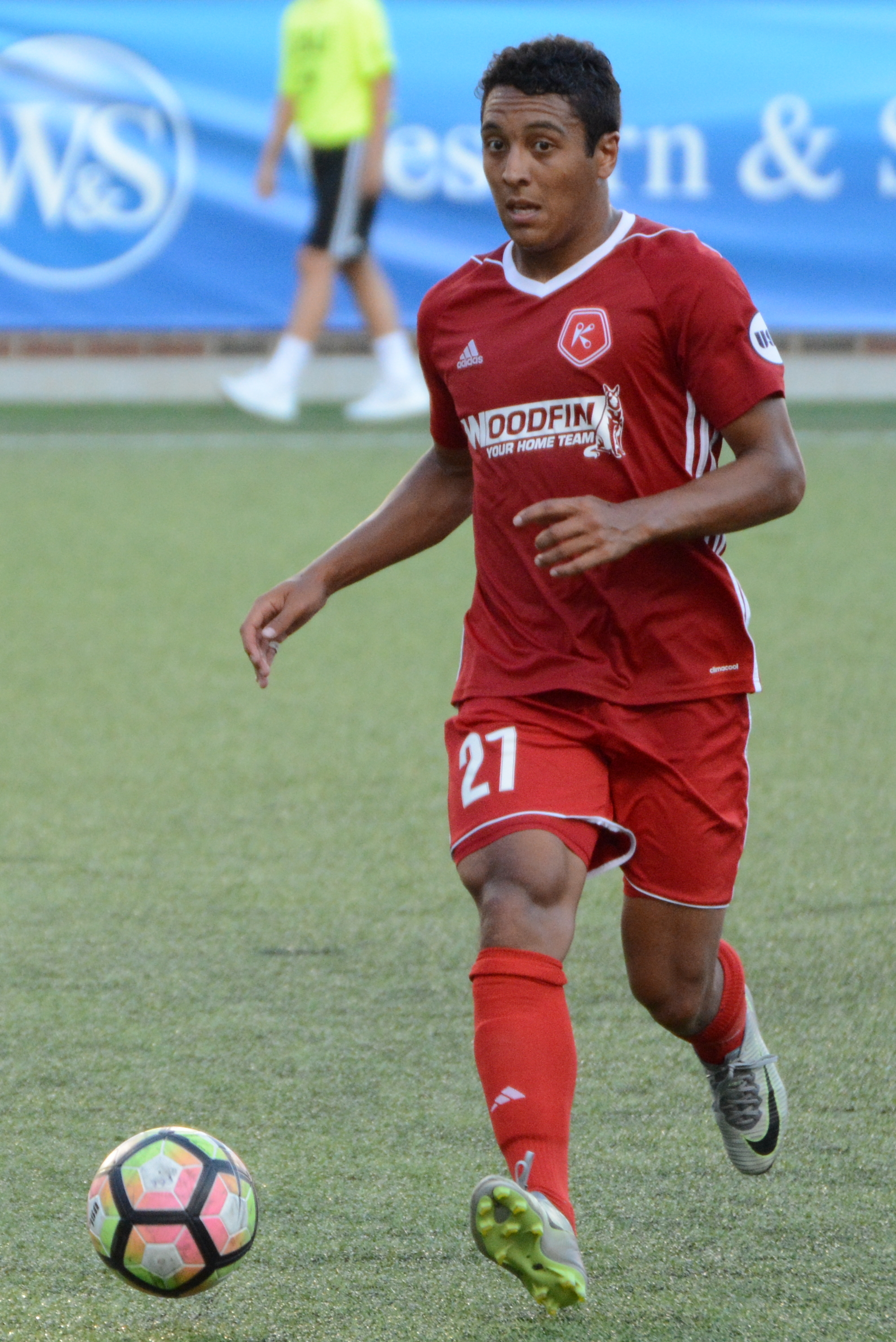
- González playing for Richmond Kickers in 2017.

Personal information
- Full name: Raúl González III
- Date of birth: 23 September 1994 (age 32)
- Place of birth: Ocean Springs, Mississippi, United States
- Height: 1.73 m (5 ft 8 in)
- Position: Midfielder

Youth career
- 2007–2011: Gulf Coast United
- 2012–2013: IMG Academy

College career
Years	Team	Apps	(Gls)
2013–2016	Memphis Tigers	65	(13)

Senior career*
Years	Team	Apps	(Gls)
2016	Des Moines Menace	7	(1)
2017–2018	Richmond Kickers	56	(5)
2019–2021	Memphis 901	27	(1)

International career
2021–2022	Puerto Rico	6	(0)
- * Club domestic league appearances and goals

Raúl González III (born 23 September 1994) is a Puerto Rican footballer who plays for USL Championship club Memphis 901 FC and the Puerto Rico national team. He is usually employed as a central or attacking midfielder. He is now retired.

== Youth and college career ==
From 2007 to 2011, González played youth soccer for Gulf Coast United's development program. In 2012 to 2013, he played at as a forward/midfielder for the U-18 IMG Academy. He also played four years of high school soccer for Ocean Springs High School in Ocean Springs, Mississippi. In addition, he was a varsity letter-winner in track, football and baseball.

== Club career ==
Between his junior and senior years of college, González played in seven matches for the Premier Development League side, Des Moines Menace. He made seven appearances and tallied one goal for the Menace.

On 30 March 2017, González signed a professional contract with the Richmond Kickers of the United Soccer League. He scored his first goal for the Kickers on 21 May 2017 in a 1–1 away draw at Rochester Rhinos.

González joined USL Championship expansion team Memphis 901 FC ahead of the 2019 season. Unfortunately, he sustained a season-ending knee injury during a preseason friendly match against Louisville City FC on 20 February 2019.

== International career ==
In October 2020, it was announced that González agreed to represent Puerto Rico internationally for the upcoming 2022 FIFA World Cup qualification set to start in 2021. He made his international debut on 19 January 2021, as a starter in a 1–0 away friendly win against the Dominican Republic.
