= Roger Thomas (footballer) =

Jamaican footballer (born 1973)

Personal information
- Date of birth: 17 April 1973 (age 53)
- Place of birth: Jamaica
- Positions: Midfielder; forward

Senior career*
Years	Team	Apps	(Gls)
1998	Miami Fusion	5	(1)
- * Club domestic league appearances and goals

Roger Thomas (born 17 April 1973) is a Jamaican retired footballer.

== Career ==
At the age of 13, a teacher asked Thomas "what he was going to do with his life besides play soccer", which inspired him to do well in school. As a result, Thomas left Jamaica after high school to attend college in the United States.

After training with Chilean side Club Deportivo Universidad Católica, he signed for Miami Fusion in the American top flight.
