= Anthony Augustine =

Grenadian footballer

Personal information
- Full name: Anthony Augustine
- Date of birth: September 26, 1980 (age 46)
- Place of birth: Saint Mark Parish, Grenada
- Height: 6 ft 0 in (1.83 m)
- Position: Midfielder

Team information
- Current team: Western Mass Pioneers
- Number: 12

Youth career
- 2000–2003: Southern New Hampshire Penmen

Senior career*
Years	Team	Apps	(Gls)
2005–2010	Western Mass Pioneers	85	(1)

International career^{‡}
2001–2011	Grenada	6	(1)
- * Club domestic league appearances and goals as of March 21, 2013 ‡ National team caps and goals as of March 21, 2013

Anthony Augustine (born September 26, 1980) is a retired Grenadian footballer.

== Career ==
=== College and amateur ===
Augustine came to the United States in 2000 to play college soccer at Southern New Hampshire University. While at SNHU Augustine was named to the NSCAA All-New England second team and the ALL NE-10 team in 2002 and 2003.

=== Professional ===
Augustine turned professional in 2005, playing for the Western Mass Pioneers in the USL Second Division. He made his debut on April 22, 2005, in the Pioneers' home opener against the Charlotte Eagles, and has been with the team ever since, anchoring the team's midfield. He helped the Pioneers to the 2005 USL2 regular season championship, and has made over 70 appearances for the team in total.

=== International ===
Augustine has been a part of the Grenada national football team camp since 2001, and made his most recent appearance for the Spice Boys in a 2004 world cup qualifier against Guyana.
