= Derek Potteiger =

American soccer player

Personal information
- Date of birth: 6 January 1980 (age 46)
- Place of birth: United States
- Position: Midfielder

Senior career*
Years	Team	Apps	(Gls)
2002	New England Revolution	0	(0)
2002-2003	Pittsburgh Riverhounds	48	(3)
2004-2006	Harrisburg City Islanders	48	(5)
2007-2008	Cleveland City Stars	37	(4)

Managerial career
- 2009–2013: Navy Midshipmen (assistant)
- 2013–2017: Gordon College Fighting Scots
- 2017–: Lee University Flames
- * Club domestic league appearances and goals

Derek Potteiger (born 6 January 1980 in the United States) is an American retired soccer player.

== College ==
Potteiger attended Cumberland Valley High School before playing collegiately at Penn State University for Penn State Nittany Lions men's soccer. During his time at the university, he was a 2001 preseason All-American, a first-team All-Big Ten selection, and was named the Penn State Nike Classic MVP and to the All-Tournament Team. Potteiger would earn Big Team First Team honors three of his four years at Penn State, and was named team MVP his sophomore year.

== Professional ==
Potteiger was selected with the 41st pick in the 2002 MLS SuperDraft by the New England Revolution of Major League Soccer on February 10, 2002. He was released by the team on March 14, 2002. Potteiger then signed with Pittsburgh Riverhounds SC of the A-League as a "Territorial draft pick" in April. He finished the 2002 A-League season with 27 appearances (16 starts) scoring one goal and notching three assists.

When the Riverhounds dropped down to the USL Pro Soccer League (USL's second division) for the 2004 season, Potteiger joined the expansion team Harrisburg City Islanders for their 2004 inaugural league campaign and became a fan-favorite. He was eventually named the club's captain, and in 2005 signed a contract extension through 2010. He was named to the Pro Soccer League Team of the Week for the first week of the 2004 season, and would earn the honor three more times before being named to the 2004 All-USL First Team.

Potteiger spent three seasons with the City Islanders (all as team captain) before joining the Cleveland City Stars in April of 2007, with whom he won the 2009 USL Second Division championship.

== Coaching ==
In 2009 Potteiger became an assistant coach to Dave Brandt for Navy Midshipmen men's soccer. In January 2013, Potteiger was named head coach of Gordon College's men's soccer team. Potteiger spent 4 years at Gordon, posting a 61-18-3 record, before becoming head coach at Lee University in January 2017.

== Honors ==
Cleveland City Stars

USL Second Division Championship: (2008)
