= John Dugan (soccer) =

American soccer player and coach

Personal information
- Positions: Forward; midfielder

Youth career
- 1986–1990: VCU Rams

Senior career*
Years	Team	Apps	(Gls)
1992–1993	Canton Invaders (indoor)	38	(22)
1993–1994	Richmond Kickers		
1993–1994	Richmond Kickers (indoor)	7	(24)
1994–1995	Canton Invaders (indoor)	16	(11)
1998	Richmond Kickers		
1999	Raleigh Express	16	(2)

Managerial career
- 1999: Raleigh Express (assistant)
- 1999–2000: Raleigh Express
- 2001: Atlanta Silverbacks
- * Club domestic league appearances and goals

John Dugan is an American retired soccer player and coach who both played and coached professionally in the USL A-League.

== Player ==
Dugan attended Virginia Commonwealth University, playing on the men's soccer team from 1986 to 1990. In 1992, he joined the Canton Invaders of the National Professional Soccer League. In 1993, he moved to the Richmond Kickers in the USISL. During the 1993–94 USISL indoor season, Dugan scored twenty-four goals in seven games, putting him second on the league's points chart. In the fall of 1994, Dugan returned to the Canton Invaders for a single season. In 1998, he again played for the Kickers before finishing his playing career with the Raleigh Express in 1999.

== Coach ==
In 1999, the Raleigh Capital Express hired Dugan as a player-assistant coach. Midway through the season, he became head coach. In 2001, he move to the Atlanta Silverbacks as head coach. In 2003, he was the General Manager of the Richmond Kickers youth clubs.
