= Alex Lee (Guamanian footballer) =

American soccer player

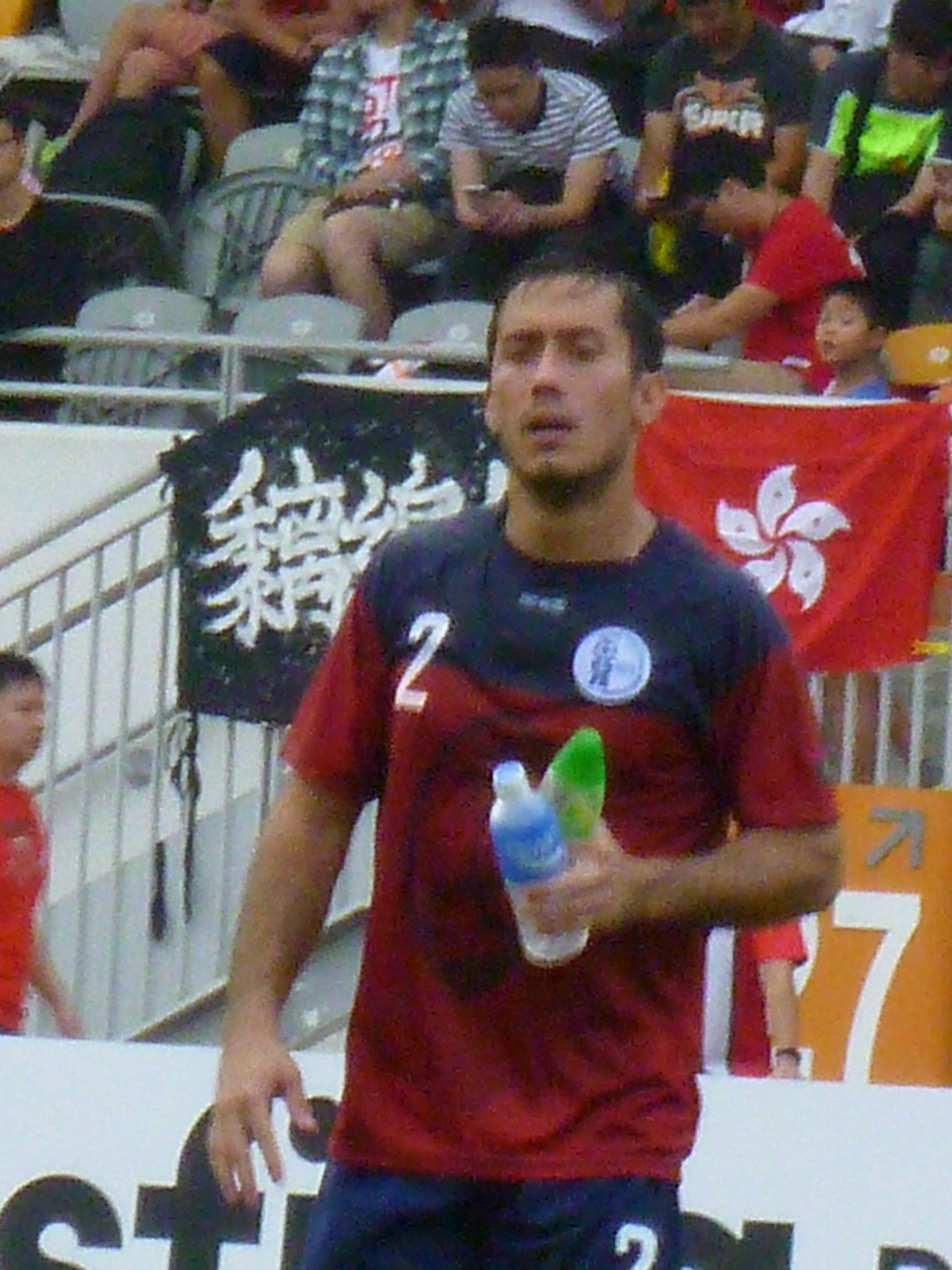

Personal information
- Full name: Alexander Francis Vei Chen Lee
- Date of birth: January 15, 1990 (age 36)
- Place of birth: Rockville, Maryland, United States
- Height: 5 ft 10 in (1.78 m)
- Positions: Defender; defensive midfielder

Team information
- Current team: FC Frederick

Youth career
- Potomac Cougars

College career
Years	Team	Apps	(Gls)
2008–2011	Maryland Terrapins	65	(0)

Senior career*
Years	Team	Apps	(Gls)
2011	Real Maryland	6	(1)
2012	FC Dallas	0	(0)
2013–2018	Richmond Kickers	122	(2)
2019–	FC Frederick		

International career^{‡}
2015–2021	Guam	19	(0)
- * Club domestic league appearances and goals ‡ National team caps and goals as of 18:09, 13 June 2021 (UTC)

Alexander Francis Vei Chen Lee (born January 15, 1990), known as Alex Lee, is a Guamanian international footballer who currently plays for FC Frederick. Alex is sometimes referred to by his nickname "A-Lee.” He is a Guam international.

== Club career ==
=== College ===
Lee played college soccer at the University of Maryland, College Park between 2008 and 2011. Lee missed the majority of his sophomore year in 2009 season due to injury from a car accident.

While at college, Lee played for USL PDL club Real Maryland Monarchs during their 2011 season.

=== Professional ===
Lee was selected by FC Dallas with the 11th pick in the first round of the 2012 MLS Supplemental Draft. He signed with Dallas on March 13, 2012. Lee failed to appear with Dallas during their 2012 season and was released at the end of the season.

Lee signed with USL Pro club Richmond Kickers on March 5, 2013.

== Personal life ==
Lee has two brothers; a twin, Justin and a younger brother, Nate, who have both also represented Guam at international level. All three made their debut in the same game against Hong Kong.
