= Orlando Bueso =

Honduran football player (born 1974)

Personal information
- Full name: Orlando Bueso
- Date of birth: May 13, 1974 (age 52)
- Place of birth: Atlántida, Honduras
- Height: 5 ft 6 in (1.68 m)
- Position: Midfielder

Youth career
- 1995–1998: Lindsey Wilson Blue Raiders

Senior career*
Years	Team	Apps	(Gls)
1999–2002	Richmond Kickers		
2008	Honduras Five Star		
2009	Miami FC	15	(1)
- * Club domestic league appearances and goals as of 22 October 2009

Orlando Bueso (born May 13, 1974) is a Honduran football player who last played for Miami FC in the USL First Division.

== Career ==
=== College and amateur ===
Bueso grew up in Hialeah, Florida, and played college soccer at the Lindsey Wilson College. He is the only player in Lindsey Wilson history to be a four-time first-team All-American and, in 1998, became the first Blue Raider to be named NAIA National Player of the Year. He is the school's all-time leader in points (208) and assists (48), ranks second in goals scored (80), and helped lead the Blue Raiders to an 84-13-5 record during his career, including three NAIA national championships. He was voted to Lindsey Wilson's Athletic Hall of Fame in 2004.

=== Professional ===
Bueso was drafted in the first round of the 1999 A-League draft by Richmond Kickers, and played for them for several years before disappearing to the amateur ranks in the mid-2000s.

After playing with the amateur Honduras Five Star (Honduras Cinco Estrellas) in the Copa Latina qualification tournament for the 2008 US Open Cup, Bueso signed with Miami FC of the USL First Division on April 13, 2009. He scored one goal in 15 games that season.
