= Kevin Jeffrey =

Trinidad and Tobago footballer

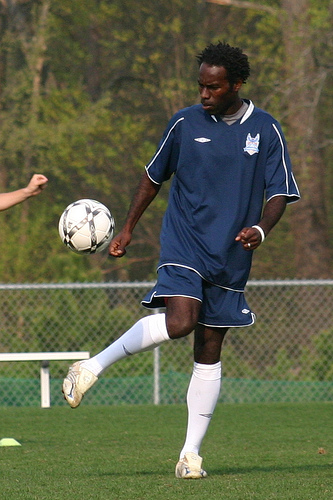
- Jeffrey in 2007

Personal information
- Date of birth: 4 October 1974 (age 52)
- Place of birth: Trincity, Trinidad and Tobago
- Height: 6 ft 0 in (1.83 m)
- Position: Forward

Youth career
- 1996–1997: Yavapai Roughriders
- 1998–1999: VCU Rams

Senior career*
Years	Team	Apps	(Gls)
2000	San Juan Jabloteh F.C.		
2000	Bay Area Seals	24	(12)
2001–2005	Richmond Kickers	124	(40)
2005	→ North East Stars F.C. (loan)		
2006	Toronto Lynx	22	(9)
2007	Carolina RailHawks	14	(0)
Total		184	(61)

International career
2003	Trinidad and Tobago	1	(0)
- * Club domestic league appearances and goals

Kevin Jeffrey (born 4 October 1974 in Trincity, Trinidad and Tobago) is a former professional football (soccer) forward who spent eight seasons in the USL First Division. After his playing career, he became a football manager.

After a successful college-level experience, he was drafted first overall by the San Francisco Bay Seals, making his professional debut in 2000. Good form led to an international call-up in 2000, after he was signed by Richmond Kickers in 2001. It was at Richmond where Jeffrey was able to establish himself as a consistent striker with a proven track record. Received several Team of the Week, and Player of the Week selections and led Richmond to claim their second Conference title. Once the Kickers were relegated, Jeffrey finished off his career with stints in Toronto and Carolina.

== Youth level ==
He started playing amateur soccer with Yavapai Junior College in 1997, where he led Yavapai to a National Junior College Athletic Association championship. He earned the first-team Junior College All-American honors and was named Junior College Player of the Year. Later on, he would go and play NCAA soccer with Virginia Commonwealth University for two years, being named to the first-team All-Colonial Athletic Association team both years. And won the Virginia State Player of the Year in 1999 and third-team NSCAA All-American. He tallied 29 goals and 7 assists in 38 games for the Rams and hold their school record for most goals in a season with 18, a mark that was once held by John Dugan with 17 in 1987.

In 2009, he was inducted into the NJCAA hall of fame along with footballer Stern John.

== Playing career ==
=== A-League ===
He was the first overall pick in the 2000 A-League draft by the San Francisco Bay Seals where he recorded 12 goals and 3 assists as a rookie and finished as the club's top goal scorer. He earlier played in the TT Pro League with San Juan Jabloteh F.C.

When the ownership of San Francisco went on hiatus in 2001 Jeffrey remained in the A-League by signing with league rivals Richmond Kickers. In his first season with the club, he led the Kickers in goals and points, scoring 20 goals, adding 9 assists, and was named Team of the Week twice. He also assisted the club in winning the Central Conference title and was selected to the All A-League First team. He helped Richmond make the championship final the following season but was defeated by Milwaukee Rampage. In the 2003 season, he finished as the top goal scorer for the club for the second time in his career as a result was named to the All A-League Second Team.

He re-signed with Richmond for this fifth and final season in 2005. In his final season with the Kickers, he helped the club reach the USL Championship final once more where his team lost in a penalty shoot-out to the Seattle Sounders. In the winter of 2005, he was loaned to North East Stars F.C. in the TT Pro League.,

=== USL First Division ===
After the 2005 season, the Kickers were relegated to the USL Second Division and Jeffrey remained in the First Division with the Toronto Lynx. Jeffrey made his Lynx debut on 4 June 2006 coming on as a substitute for Damien Pottinger in a match against the Virginia Beach Mariners. He would record his first goal on 21 July 2006 in a 1–1 draw against rivals Rochester Rhinos. He was selected to the USL First Division First All-League team three times and named USL Player of the Week. He concluded the season as the team's leading goal scorer with nine goals and helped the Toronto club reach the finals of the Open Canada Cup.

After the 2006 season, the Lynx franchise dropped two divisions down to the USL Premier Development League, thus releasing Jeffrey from his Toronto contract. He signed with expansion franchise Carolina RailHawks in 2007 and appeared in fourteen league games for the RailHawks.

== International career ==
He has also earned one cap with the Trinidad and Tobago national team in 2003. On 19 November 2003, he made his debut for the national team in a friendly match against Cuba.

== Managerial career ==
On 7 December 2009, he was appointed Director of Football for the North East Stars in the TT Pro League. In 2018, he was named the under- 18 head coach for San Juan Jabloteh F.C.
