= Robert Ssejjemba =

Ugandan footballer (born 1980)

Personal information
- Full name: Robert Ssejjemba
- Date of birth: 5 December 1980 (age 45)
- Place of birth: Kampala, Uganda
- Height: 5 ft 8 in (1.73 m)
- Position: Forward

College career
Years	Team	Apps	(Gls)
2000–2004	Virginia Intermont College		

Senior career*
Years	Team	Apps	(Gls)
2004	Kalamazoo Kingdom	15	(12)
2005–2007	Richmond Kickers	31	(22)
2006	→ D.C. United (loan)	1	(0)
2007	Charlotte Eagles	16	(5)

International career
2005–2006	Uganda	2	(0)

Managerial career
- 2009–2013: Virginia Intermont Cobras
- 2014–2019: Southwest Mustangs
- 2019–: Wayland Baptist Pioneers
- * Club domestic league appearances and goals

Robert Ssejjemba (born 5 December 1980) is a retired Ugandan professional soccer player and the current coach of the Wayland Baptist University men's soccer program.

== Career ==
Late in the 2006 Major League Soccer season, he made one start for D.C. United, but was not signed to a professional contract by them. He then played the 2007 season with the Richmond Kickers before moving to the Charlotte Eagles for the 2008 season. In the 2008 USL Second Division final with the Eagles, however, an ACL injury ended Ssejjemba's playing career. He also made several appearances for the Ugandan national team, including qualifiers for the 2006 World Cup.

In 2009, he became the head coach of the revived men's soccer program at Virginia Intermont College, his alma mater. After the college closed permanently, he became the head coach for the University of the Southwest men's team from 2014 until 2019. In 2019, he became the head coach of Wayland Baptist University.
