= Raleigh Express =

Raleigh Capital Express logo.

The Raleigh Express was a soccer club that competed in the United Soccer Leagues from 1993 to 2000. Based in Raleigh, North Carolina, the club started as the Raleigh Flyers in the USISL before moving to the A-League in 1997. In 1999, the club was renamed the Express, and in 2000, became the Raleigh Capital Express.

The Express were the inaugural winners of the Southern Derby competition, and shortly thereafter folded.

== Year-by-year ==
Year	Division	League	Reg. season	Playoffs	Open Cup
1993	N/A	USISL	3rd, Atlantic	Divisional Semifinals	Did not enter
1994	3	USISL	4th, Atlantic	Divisional Semifinals	Did not enter
1995	3	USISL Pro League	3rd, Atlantic	Divisional Finals	Did not qualify
1996	3	USISL Select League	5th, South Atlantic	Did not qualify	Did not qualify
1997	2	USISL A-League	5th, Atlantic	Did not qualify	Did not qualify
1998	2	USISL A-League	7th, Atlantic	Did not qualify	Did not qualify
1999	2	USL A-League	7th, Atlantic	Did not qualify	Did not qualify
2000	2	USL A-League	5th, Atlantic	Conference Quarterfinals	Did not qualify

== Players ==
Preceded by none	Southern Derby Winner; 2000	Succeeded by Charlotte Eagles
