= McColm Cephas =

Liberian former footballer

Personal information
- Full name: McColm Cephas
- Date of birth: 30 September 1978 (age 48)
- Place of birth: Monrovia, Liberia
- Height: 5 ft 5 in (1.65 m)
- Position: Forward

Youth career
- 2002–2003: VCU Rams

Senior career*
Years	Team	Apps	(Gls)
2003	Richmond Kickers Future	11	(8)
2004–2005	Richmond Kickers	47	(11)
2006	Virginia Beach Mariners	12	(0)
2007	Carolina RailHawks	14	(1)
Total		84	(20)

International career
2004	Liberia	2	(0)
- * Club domestic league appearances and goals

McColm Cephas (born 30 September 1978) is a Liberian former footballer who played as a forward. He has earned two caps with the Liberia national team.

== Career ==
Cephas attended Virginia Commonwealth University where he played for the men's soccer team in 2002 and 2003.

He played two World Cup 2006 qualifying games for Liberia in 2004.

In 2007, Cephas signed with the Carolina RailHawks of the USL First Division. He scored only one goal in fourteen league games, but more significantly, he scored the only goal as Carolina upset the Chicago Fire, holders of the cup, in the 2007 Lamar Hunt U.S. Open Cup.
