= Robert Ukrop =

American former soccer player (born 1970)

Rob Ukrop
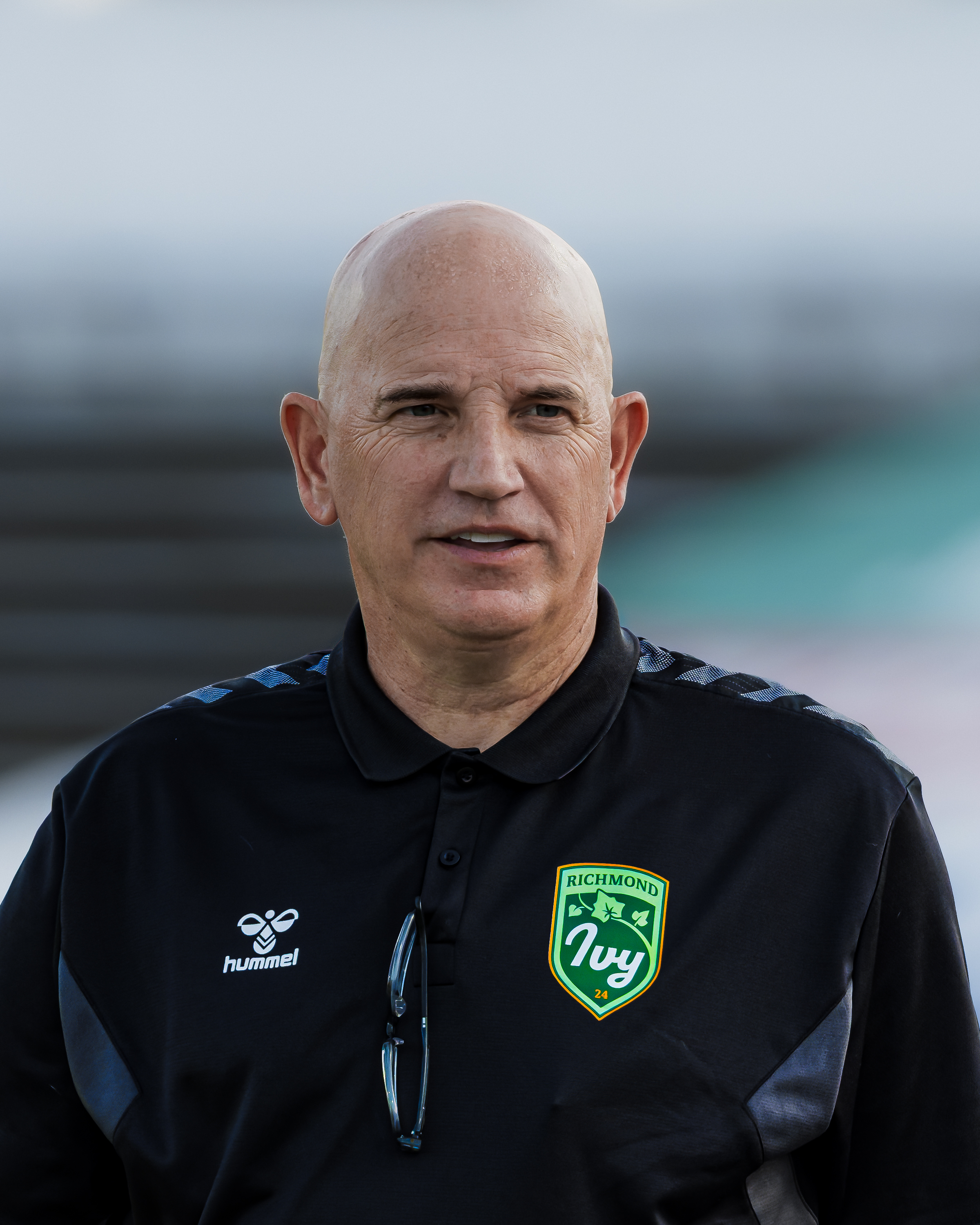
- Ukrop coaching the Richmond Ivy SC in 2026

Personal information
- Full name: Robert Stephen Ukrop Jr.
- Date of birth: April 5, 1970 (age 56)
- Place of birth: Richmond, Virginia, U.S.
- Height: 6 ft 2 in (1.88 m)
- Position: Forward

Team information
- Current team: Richmond Kickers (chairman) Richmond Ivy ( Head Coach)

College career
Years	Team	Apps	(Gls)
1988–1992	Davidson Wildcats		

Senior career*
Years	Team	Apps	(Gls)
1993	Richmond Kickers	7	
1993–1994	Baltimore Spirit (indoor)	29	(13)
1994	Raleigh Flyers	15	(10)
1994	Fort Lauderdale Strikers		
1994–1995	Dayton Dynamo (indoor)	31	(33)
1995	Richmond Kickers		
1996	New England Revolution	9	(2)
1996–1997	Cincinnati Silverbacks (indoor)	5	(3)
1996–2004	Richmond Kickers		

International career
1993	United States U23		
- * Club domestic league appearances and goals

Robert Stephen Ukrop Jr. (born April 5, 1970) is an American former soccer player who is chairman of USL League One club Richmond Kickers and head coach of USL W League club Richmond Ivy.

Ukrop, part of the Ukrop's Super Market family, grew up in Richmond where he attended Collegiate School where he starred with both the school's golf and soccer teams. When Ukrop graduated from high school in 1988, he had roster offers from Wake Forest and the University of Richmond. However, he chose to attend Davidson College. He was a member of the Sigma chapter of the Kappa Alpha Order. At the time, Davidson had no soccer pedigree, but Ukrop brought it into national prominence during his four and a half seasons there. His junior year, Ukrop scored 22 goals and assisted on 12, earning him second team All American honors. However, he broke his leg at the start of the 1991 season. As a result, he was a medical redshirt that year, but came back strong in 1992. In 1992, his last season at Davidson, Ukrop led the nation in scoring, bagging 31 goals and assisting on 10 others. He also led Davidson to the NCAA Final Four only to fall to San Diego 3–2 in overtime in the semifinals. That year, Ukrop was named a first team All American and the ISAA Player of the Year. He finished his four years at Davidson with the school record in career goals (76), points (184) and assists. His points total is almost double the next player on the points list.

While still at Davidson, Ukrop played with the U.S. national B Team. After graduating from Davidson in 1993 with a bachelor's degree in classical studies, Ukrop went to the World University Games with the U.S. U-23 national team. He scored two goals and added an assist in the U.S. victory over Italy. That summer he also joined the Richmond Kickers of the USISL. The USISL had begun as a small indoor league in the Southwest U.S., but gradually expanded outdoor as well. In 1993, the Kickers joined the league, making the playoffs as a wild card team. They defeated the Charleston Battery, then lost to the eventual USISL champion Greensboro Dynamo.

Ukrop spent the 1993–1994 indoor season with the Baltimore Spirit of the National Professional Soccer League (NPSL). That year, he lost a significant number of games when he took an elbow to his face, resulting in a broken jaw.

Ukrop then moved to the Raleigh Flyers (USISL) for the 1994 outdoor season, before moving to the Fort Lauderdale Strikers of the American Professional Soccer League (APSL). He then spent the 1994–95 indoor season with the Dayton Dynamo of the NPSL. The Dynamo moved to Cincinnati and renamed itself the Silverbacks in 1995. In 1996, Ukrop rejoined the team for the 1996–1997 season.

In 1995, he was with the Richmond Kickers when that team won the USISL title. Ukrop was a USISL Atlantic Division All Star. The Kickers also took the 1995 U.S. Open Cup with Ukrop being named the championship game MVP.

In January 1996, the New England Revolution drafted Ukrop in the seventh round (65th overall) of the 1996 MLS Draft. He scored the Revolution's first goal (and second goal, recording the team's first brace) in team history on April 13, 1996, against the Tampa Bay Mutiny. However, he never became a regular contributor for the Revs, managing only nine games and the aforementioned two goals, both goals coming in the Revolution's first game of the season. The Revs released Ukrop on June 28, 1996, and he returned to the Richmond Kickers for the remainder of the season. Ukrop continued to play each season with the Kickers until he announced his retirement on December 9, 2004. Ukrop retired holding the club records for career goals (70), career assists (30), career points (170) and matches (231).

On January 24, 2004, Davidson retired Ukrop's jersey number (#6) and inducted him into its Hall of Fame. On April 30, 2017, Ukrop was inducted into Virginia Sports Hall of Fame.

In 2019, 22 Holdings, LLC, an organization consisting of former Davidson College soccer players and led by Ukrop, acquired a controlling interest in the Richmond Kickers. Ukrop is currently the chairman and CEO.

In 2026 Ukrop became the head coach of the Richmond Ivy.
