= Leigh Cowlishaw =

English footballer and coach

Personal information
- Date of birth: 16 December 1970 (age 55)
- Place of birth: Burton upon Trent, England
- Position: Midfielder

College career
Years	Team	Apps	(Gls)
1989–1992	Richmond Spiders		

Senior career*
Years	Team	Apps	(Gls)
1993–1999	Richmond Kickers	148	(19)
2007–2009	Richmond Kickers	4	(1)
Total		152	(20)

Managerial career
- 2000–2018: Richmond Kickers
- 2012: Richmond Spiders (interim)
- * Club domestic league appearances and goals

Leigh Cowlishaw (born 16 December 1970) is an English former footballer and coach. He served as the head coach of the Richmond Kickers from 2000 until 2018.

== Career ==
=== Coaching ===
Cowlishaw had been manager of the Kickers since 2000, during which time he coached the team to a Central Conference title in his debut year, two USL2 regular season titles in 2006 and 2007, three US Open Cup quarter final berths in 2001, 2004 and 2007, and two USL Second division championships, in 2006 and 2009. He is a two-time USL2 Coach of the Year nominee, helped guide the organisation to four USL Organization of the Year awards (1995, 2000, 2006 and 2007), the Fair Play Award in 2004, and was named FieldTurf USL2 Coach of the Year in 2006.

On June 26, 2018, Cowlishaw stepped down as the head coach of the Kickers to assume the Director of Soccer role with the club.
