= 2002 USL A-League =

USL A-League -2002 Season-
- Season: 2002
- Teams: 18
- Champions: Milwaukee Rampage (2nd Title)
- Premiers: Seattle Sounders (2nd Title)
- Matches: 252
- Goals: 751 (2.98 per match)
- Best Player: (United States) Leighton O'Brien, Seattle Sounders
- Top goalscorer: (United States) McKinley Tennyson, Portland Timbers, (Syria) Fadi Afash, Portland Timbers (Cuba) Eduardo Sebrango, Montreal Impact (18 goals each)
- Best goalkeeper: (United States) Dusty Hudock, Charleston Battery

The 2002 USL A-League was an American Division II league run by the United Soccer League during the summer of 2002.

== League standings ==
=== Eastern Conference ===
==== Northeast Division ====
Pos	Team	Pld	W	L	T	GF	GA	GD	BP	Pts
1	Rochester Raging Rhinos	28	17	8	3	38	25	+13	1	72
2	Montreal Impact	28	16	9	3	39	29	+10	5	72
3	Toronto Lynx	28	10	13	5	37	35	+2	3	48
4	Pittsburgh Riverhounds	28	8	15	5	39	44	−5	4	41

Source: kenn.com

==== Southeast Division ====
Pos	Team	Pld	W	L	T	GF	GA	GD	BP	Pts
1	Charleston Battery	28	19	3	6	46	16	+30	7	89
2	Richmond Kickers	28	13	9	6	44	37	+7	7	65
3	Atlanta Silverbacks	28	13	13	2	47	44	+3	8	62
4	Charlotte Eagles	28	10	14	4	46	46	0	6	50
5	Hampton Roads Mariners	28	6	19	3	25	57	−32	2	29

Source: kenn.com

=== Western Conference ===
==== Central Division ====
Pos	Team	Pld	W	L	T	GF	GA	GD	BP	Pts
1	Milwaukee Rampage	28	16	7	5	48	29	+19	6	75
2	Minnesota Thunder	28	14	9	5	55	35	+20	9	70
3	Cincinnati Riverhawks	28	8	20	0	35	68	−33	3	35 (Note: Cincinnati lost three point for using an ineligible player (bonus points entry total reflects this deduction))
4	Indiana Blast	28	6	18	4	29	67	−38	1	29

Source: kenn.com

==== Pacific Division ====
Pos	Team	Pld	W	L	T	GF	GA	GD	BP	Pts
1	Seattle Sounders	28	23	4	1	71	27	+44	14	107
2	Portland Timbers	28	13	12	3	47	39	+8	8	63
3	Vancouver Whitecaps	28	11	12	5	41	39	+2	5	54
4	El Paso Patriots	28	10	11	7	38	48	−10	7	54
5	Calgary Storm	28	4	21	3	26	66	−40	3	22

Source: kenn.com

The 2002 USL A-League points system was 4 points for a win, 1 point for a draw, 0 points for a loss + 1 bonus point when scoring three or more goals in a game.

== Playoff bracket ==
First Round
W4	Portland Timbers	0	0	0
W5	Vancouver Whitecaps	1	1	2
Western Conference
W3	Minnesota Thunder	2	1	3
W6	El Paso Patriots	1	1	2
E4	Richmond Kickers	1	2	3
E5	Atlanta Silverbacks	1	1	2
Eastern Conference
E3	Montreal Impact (p)	0	1	1 (6)
E6	Charlotte Eagles	1	0	1 (5)

Conference Semifinals
W1	Seattle Sounders	0	2	2
W5	Vancouver Whitecaps	2	6	8
W2	Milwaukee Rampage	0	2	2
W3	Minnesota Thunder	0	1	1
E1	Charleston Battery	2	1	3
E4	Richmond Kickers	1	3	4
E2	Rochester Raging Rhinos	0	1	1
E3	Montreal Impact	0	0	0

Conference Finals
W2	Milwaukee Rampage (a.e.t.)	0	2	2
W5	Vancouver Whitecaps	0	1	1
E4	Richmond Kickers (p)	1	0	1 (9)
E2	Rochester Raging Rhinos	1	0	1 (8)

Final
Milwaukee Rampage (a.e.t.)	2
Richmond Kickers	1

== Playoff first round ==
=== Charlotte vs Montreal ===
September 4, 2002
7:00 PM EST

Charlotte Eagles (NC)	1–0	Montreal Impact (QC)
Dwyane Demmin 17'	Report	(yellow card) 30' Adam Braz; (yellow card) 67' Nevio Pizzolitto

Transamerica Field, Charlotte, North Carolina
Attendance: 546

September 8, 2002
4:00 PM EST

Montreal Impact (QC)	1–0 (a.e.t.)	Charlotte Eagles (NC)
Eduardo Sebrango 36'
Penalties
Patrick Leduc (penalty scored); Giuliano Oliviero (penalty scored); Darko Kolic (penalty scored); Eduardo Sebrango (penalty scored); Gabriel Gervais (penalty scored); Mark Rowland (penalty scored)	6–5	(penalty scored) Andy McDermott; (penalty scored) Leo Gajardo; (penalty scored) Dustin Swinehart; (penalty scored) Jamie Wellington; (penalty scored) Carlos Calderson; (penalty missed) Nathan Watkins

Complexe sportif Claude-Robillard, Montreal, Quebec
Attendance: 6,883

Montreal advances on penalties after series tied 1–1 on aggregate.

=== Richmond vs Atlanta ===
September 5, 2002

Richmond Kickers (VA)	1–1	Atlanta Silverbacks (GA)
Peter Luzak (yellow card) 23'; Josh Henderson (yellow card) 86'; Peter Luzak 90'	Report	36', (red card) 88' James Wall; (yellow card) 42' Alan Woods; (yellow card) 56' Jason Annicchero; (yellow card) 86' Jeff Cassar

Sports Backers Stadium, Richmond, Virginia
Attendance: 1,258
Referee: Todd Perry

September 8, 2002
6:00 PM EST

Atlanta Silverbacks (GA)	1–2	Richmond Kickers (VA)
Philippe Godoy (yellow card) 10'; Ryan Leib (yellow card) 20'; Jason Annicchero (yellow card) 39'; John Barry Nusum (yellow card) 55', (goal) 88'; Gilbert Jean-Baptiste (yellow card) 66'; Byron Mitchell (yellow card) 78' (yellow-red card) 84'	Report	8' Josh Henderson; (yellow card) 13' Bryan Namoff; (yellow card) 39' Kevin Knight; 45' Kevin Jeffrey; (yellow card) 80' Khary Stockton

DeKalb Memorial Stadium, Clarkston, Georgia
Attendance: 351
Referee: Kermit Quisenberry

Richmond advances 3–2 on aggregate.

=== Minnesota vs El Paso ===
September 5, 2002

El Paso Patriots (TX)	1–2	Minnesota Thunder (MN)
Johnny Frias 7'		25' Johnny Torres; 29' Johnny Menyongar

Sun Bowl, El Paso, Texas
Attendance: 1,270

September 7, 2002
8:00 PM EST

Minnesota Thunder (MN)	1–1	El Paso Patriots (TX)
Zafer Kılıçkan 70'		32' (pen.) Jose Abarca

National Sports Center, Blaine, Minnesota
Attendance: 1,567

Minnesota advances 3–2 on aggregate.

=== Vancouver vs Portland ===
September 5, 2002
7:05 PM PST

Portland Timbers (OR)	0–1	Vancouver Whitecaps (BC)
Keith Costigan (yellow card) 10'; Fadi Afash (yellow card) 68'; Brent Sancho (yellow card) 69'	Report	32' Paul Dailly; (yellow card) 43' Chris Franks; (yellow card) 45' Ollie Heald; (yellow card) 68' Nick Dasovic

PGE Park, Portland, Oregon
Attendance: 4,071

September 7, 2002

Vancouver Whitecaps (BC)	1–0	Portland Timbers (OR)
Steve Kindel 52'	Report

Swangard Stadium, Burnaby, British Columbia
Attendance: 4,060

Vancouver Whitecaps advance 2–0 on aggregate.

== Conference semifinals ==
=== Eastern Conference Semifinal 1 ===
September 12, 2002

Montreal Impact (QC)	0–0	Rochester Rhinos (NY)
Eduardo Sebrango (yellow card) 53'; Gabriel Gervais (yellow card) 81'	Report	(yellow card) 22' Kalin Bankov; (yellow card) 30' Bill Sedgwick

Complexe sportif Claude-Robillard, Montreal, Quebec
Attendance: 6,354

September 14, 2002
8:00 PM (EST)

Rochester Rhinos (NY)	1–0	Montreal Impact (QC)
Yuri Lavrinenko (yellow card) 26'; Bill Sedgwick 62'	Report	(yellow card) 43' Patrice Bernier

Frontier Field, Rochester, New York
Attendance: 10,367

The Rochester Rhinos advanced 1–0 on aggregate.

=== Eastern Conference Semifinal 2 ===
September 13, 2002

Charleston Battery (SC)	2–1	Richmond Kickers (VA)
Justin Evans 63'; Paul Conway 87' (pen.)	Report	75' Mike Burke; (yellow card) 86' Marco Ferruzzi

Blackbaud Stadium, Charleston, South Carolina
Attendance: 2,379
Referee: Daniel Baruk (USA)

September 15, 2002
6:00 PM (EST)

Richmond Kickers (VA)	3–1	Charleston Battery (SC)
Josh Henderson 8'; Kevin Jeffrey 22'; Chris Fox (yellow card) 24'; David Hayes 36'	Report	4', (yellow card) 45' Mac Cozier; (yellow card) 15' Mark Watson

UR Stadium, Richmond, Virginia
Attendance: 2,043
Referee: Mike Stutt (USA)

The Richmond Kickers advanced 4–3 on aggregate.

=== Western Conference Semifinal 1 ===
September 12, 2002
8:30 (EST)

Minnesota Thunder (MN)	0–0	Milwaukee Rampage (WI)
Mike Gores (yellow card) 42'; Don Gramenz (yellow card) 64'; Steve Shak (yellow card) 82'; Mike Gentile (yellow card) 87'	Report

National Sports Center, Blaine, Minnesota
Attendance: 1,321

September 14, 2002
8:00 (EST)

Milwaukee Rampage (WI)	2–1	Minnesota Thunder (MN)
Miguel Saavedra 20'; John Wolyniec 77'		65' Steve Shak

Milwaukee Rampage Sports Complex, Franklin, Wisconsin
Attendance: 3,579

The Milwaukee Rampage advanced 2–1 on aggregate.

=== Western Conference Semifinal 2 ===
September 13, 2002
7:30 P.M. (PST)

Vancouver Whitecaps (BC)	2–0	Seattle Sounders (WA)
Chris Franks (yellow card) 3'; Jason Jordan 44', 90'; Jeff Clarke (yellow card) 47'	Report	(yellow card) 14' Dick McCormick; (red card) 78' Viet Nguyen; (yellow card) 79' Leighton O'Brien

Swangard Stadium, Burnaby, British Columbia
Attendance: 5,686
Referee: Steve DePiero (USA)

September 15, 2002
5:00 P.M. (PST)

Seattle Sounders (WA)	2–6	Vancouver Whitecaps (BC)
Andrew Gregor (yellow card) 38'; Leighton O'Brien (yellow card) 43'; Kyle Smith 52'; Jason Farrell 60'; Scott Jenkins (yellow card) 61'	Report	(yellow card) 19', (goal) 26', 70' (pen.) Ollie Heald; 22' Jeff Clarke; 39' Steve Kindel; 67' Dave Morris; (yellow card) 75' Kevan Cameron; 90' Niall Thompson

Memorial Stadium, Seattle, Washington
Attendance: 3,917
Referee: Sandra Hunt (USA)

The Vancouver Whitecaps advanced 8–2 on aggregate.

== Conference finals ==
=== Eastern Conference ===
September 19, 2002

Richmond Kickers (VA)	1–1	Rochester Rhinos (NY)
Josh Henderson 49'		28' Lenin Steenkamp

Sports Backers Stadium, Richmond, Virginia
Attendance: 3,327

September 21, 2002

Rochester Rhinos (NY)	0–0 (a.e.t.)	Richmond Kickers (VA)
Penalties
Stoian Mladenov (penalty scored); Carlos Zavala (penalty scored); Yuri Lavrinenko (penalty scored); Temoc Suarez (penalty scored); Tommy Tanner (penalty scored); Bill Sedgewick (penalty scored); Craig Demmin (penalty scored); Lenin Steenkamp (penalty scored); Greg Simmonds (penalty missed)	8–9	(penalty scored) Rob Ukrop; (penalty scored) Paul Lekics; (penalty scored) Ihor Dotsenko; (penalty scored) Ray Goodlett; (penalty scored) David Hayes; (penalty scored) Mike Burke; (penalty scored) Tony Williams; (penalty scored) Kevin Knight; (penalty scored) Ronnie Pascale

Frontier Field, Rochester, New York
Attendance: 10,148

The Richmond Kickers advanced.

=== Western Conference ===
September 19, 2002
7:30 PM PST

Vancouver Whitecaps (BC)	0–0	Milwaukee Rampage (WI)
Ollie Heald (yellow card) 45'	Report

Swangard Stadium, Burnaby, British Columbia
Attendance: 6,056

September 21, 2002
8:00 PM EST

Milwaukee Rampage (WI)	2–1 (a.e.t.)	Vancouver Whitecaps (BC)
Destin Makumbu (yellow card) 43'; Matt Bobo 56', 101'; Matt Behncke (yellow card) 60'; Bobby Brennan (yellow card) 90'	Report	59' Niall Thompson

Milwaukee Rampage Sports Complex, Franklin, Wisconsin
Attendance: 3,223

The Milwaukee Rampage advanced.

== Final ==
September 28, 2002
8:00 PM EST

Milwaukee Rampage (WI)	2–1 (a.e.t.)	Richmond Kickers (VA)
John Wolyniec 45', (yellow card) 62'; Steve Bernal (yellow card) 58'; David Lara (yellow card) 68'; Siniša Angelovski 106'	Report	(yellow card) 22' Tony Williams; (yellow card) 56' (yellow-red card) 93' Khary Stockton; 59' (pen.) Marco Ferruzzi; (yellow card) 62' Kevin Knight; (yellow card) 96' Josh Henderson

Milwaukee Rampage Sports Complex, Franklin, Wisconsin
Attendance: 6,189

MPV: John Wolyniec

== Points leaders ==
Rank	Scorer	Club	GP	Goals	Assists	Points
1	(United States) McKinley Tennyson	Portland Timbers	24	18	6	42
1	(United States) Brian Ching	Seattle Sounders	25	16	8	42
3	(United States) Leighton O'Brien	Seattle Sounders	27	13	11	37
4	(Syria) Fadi Afash	Portland Timbers	22	18	0	36
4	(Cuba) Eduardo Sebrango	Montreal Impact	28	18	0	36
6	(United States) Paul Conway	Charleston Battery	25	13	6	32
7	(Liberia) Johnny Menyongar	Minnesota Thunder	25	10	11	31
8	(United States) Johnny Torres	Minnesota Thunder	23	12	5	29
9	(United States) Darren Sawatzky	Seattle Sounders	28	9	10	28
10	(United States) Dustin Swinehart	Charlotte Eagles	27	10	6	26
10	(Zimbabwe) Digital Takawira	Milwaukee Rampage	22	9	8	26
12	(Canada) Niki Budalic	Toronto Lynx	28	12	1	25
12	(United States) John Wolyniec	Milwaukee Rampage	26	10	5	25
14	(United States) Josh Henderson	Richmond Kickers	23	11	2	24
14	(United States) Brian Piesner	Atlanta Silverbacks	25	7	10	24

== Awards and All A-League teams ==
All A-League First Team
F: (United States) Brian Ching (Seattle Sounders); (United States) McKinley Tennyson (Portland Timbers) (Co-Leading Goalscorer); (Cuba) Eduardo Sebrango (Montreal Impact) (Co-Leading Goalscorer)
M: (United States) Andrew Gregor (Seattle Sounders); (United States) Leighton O'Brien (Seattle Sounders); (United States) Brian Piesner (Atlanta Silverbacks); (South Africa) Lenin Steenkamp (Rochester Raging Rhinos)
D: (Canada) Gabriel Gervais (Montreal Impact); (England) Destin Makumbu (Milwaukee Rampage); (Canada) Mark Watson (Defender of the Year)
G: (United States) Dusty Hudock (Charleston Battery) (Goalkeeper of the Year)
Coach: (United States) Brian Schmetzer, Seattle Sounders) (Coach of the Year)

All A-League Second Team
F: (Syria) Fadi Afash (Portland Timbers) (Co-Leading Goalscorer); (United States) Josh Henderson (Richmond Kickers); (Liberia) Johnny Menyongar (Minnesota Thunder)
M: (Canada) Mauro Biello (Montreal Impact); (Brazil) Luis da Gama (El Paso Patriots); (United States) Jose Gomez (Charlotte Eagles); (Canada) Steve Kindel (Vancouver Whitecaps)
D: (Trinidad and Tobago) Craig Demmin (Rochester Raging Rhinos); (Jamaica) Linval Dixon (Charleston Battery); (United States) Mark Schulte (Minnesota Thunder)
G: (United States) Preston Burpo (Seattle Sounders)

== See also ==
- 2002 U.S. Open Cup
- 2002 Voyageurs Cup
