= List of Seattle Sounders (1994–2008) seasons =

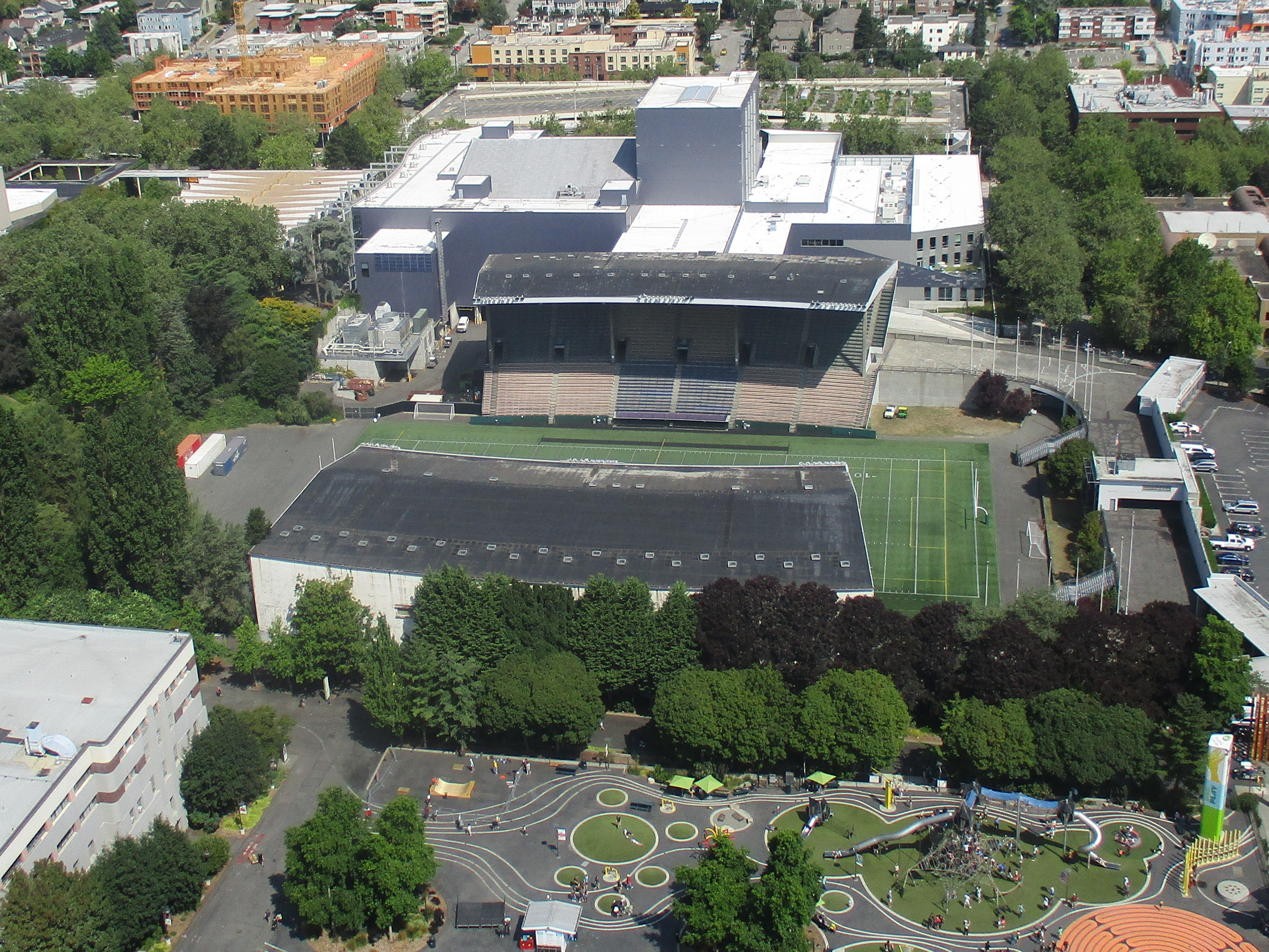
Overhead view of Memorial Stadium in Seattle, where the Sounders played for seven seasons

The Seattle Sounders were a professional soccer team based in Seattle, Washington, that played in several second-division leagues for 15 seasons from 1994 to 2008. They were the second team to use the "Sounders" name, following the original franchise who played in the North American Soccer League for ten seasons from 1974 to 1983. The revived Sounders joined the American Professional Soccer League (APSL) in 1994 and remained in the league through its renaming to the A-League in 1995 and merger with the United States Interregional Soccer League (USISL; later USL) in 1997. The USISL continued using the A-League name for its new second-division league until it was rebranded as the USL First Division in 2005. The second-division Sounders were folded in 2008 to prepare for the launch of Seattle Sounders FC, which began play in 2009 as an expansion team in Major League Soccer (MLS), the top flight of men's soccer in the United States.

The APSL, A-League, and USL First Division all used a summer calendar with a regular season that ran for 20 to 30 matches and concluded with a postseason playoffs competition to determine the winner. The points system varied over the years, with a penalty shootout after ties in regulation time used until 1999 and bonus points for scoring in some years. During their 15 seasons as a second-division team, the Sounders won four championships: the 1995 and 1996 A-League championships, and the 2005 and 2007 titles for the USL First Division. The team's overall goalscoring record is held by Mark Baena, who had 44 goals in two seasons with the Sounders. In addition to league play, the Sounders participated in the U.S. Open Cup, the national cup competition for men's teams in the United States. They were semifinalists in three editions of the competition and defeated several MLS teams in U.S. Open Cup play. Seattle also played in the 1996 edition of the CONCACAF Champions' Cup, the continental club championship, and reached the final round to finish in fourth place.

The Sounders played their inaugural season at the Tacoma Dome, an indoor venue, and Memorial Stadium in Seattle. They stayed at Memorial Stadium for the following seven seasons, with the exception of the 1999 season at Renton Memorial Stadium due to renovations. The team also proposed to build a soccer-specific stadium at various locations in the Seattle metropolitan area. On July 28, 2002, the Sounders became the first men's team to play at Qwest Field (now Lumen Field) in Seattle, which was built for both soccer and American football, and drew 25,515 spectators to break the A-League attendance record. The team moved all of their home matches to the new stadium in the 2003 season and shared the venue with the Seattle Seahawks of the National Football League. The Sounders played the opening match of their final season at Qwest Field but moved to the Starfire Sports Complex in Tukwila for the remainder of the year.

== Key ==
Key to colors and symbols

| 1st or W | Winners |
| 2nd or RU | Runners-up |
| 3rd | Third place |
| Last † | Last place |
| ♦ | League top scorer |

Key to cup record

- DNE = Did not enter
- DNQ = Did not qualify
- R1 = First round
- R2 = Second round
- R3 = Third round
- QF = Quarterfinals or Conference Semifinals
- SF = Semifinals or Conference Finals
- F = Final
- RU = Runners-up
- W = Winners

== List of seasons ==
Results of the Seattle Sounders by second-division season
| Season | League | | | | | | | | | | | | | | Position | | Playoffs | USOC | Other | | Top goalscorer(s) (Note: Top goalscorer(s) includes all goals scored in regular season matches.) | |
| Season | League | Div. | Conference | Pld. | W | L | D | SW | SL | GF | GA | GD | Pts | Pct | Conf. | Overall | Playoffs | USOC | Competition | Result | Player(s) | Goals |
|---|---|---|---|---|---|---|---|---|---|---|---|---|---|---|---|---|---|---|---|---|---|---|
| 1994 | APSL | 2 (Note: The American Professional Soccer League was sanctioned as a Division II league but was the de facto top flight league in the United States until Major League Soccer began play in 1996.) | — | 20 | 14 | 5 | — | 0 | 1 | 38 | 16 | +22 | 121 | .725 | — | 1st | SF | DNE | — | — | Chance Fry | 11 |
| 1995 | A-League | 2 | — | 24 | 13 | 4 | — | 5 | 2 | 40 | 24 | +16 | 51 | .688 | — | 2nd | W | SF | — | — | Peter Hattrup ♦ | 11 |
| 1996 | A-League | 2 | — | 27 | 12 | 11 | — | 4 | 0 | 35 | 25 | +10 | 40 | .519 | — | 3rd | W | QF | CONCACAF Champions' Cup | 4th | Jason Farrell | 6 |
| 1997 | A-League | 2 | Pacific (Note: The USISL A-League used divisions as their equivalent to conferences from 1997 to 1999 before reorganizing them under conferences beginning in the 2000 season.) | 28 | 16 | 7 | — | 2 | 3 | 42 | 19 | +23 | 50 | .661 | 2nd | 5th | QF | R2 | — | — | Mike Gailey | 10 |
| 1998 | A-League | 2 | Pacific | 28 | 17 | 10 | — | 1 | 0 | 63 | 28 | +35 | 52 | .625 | 2nd | 6th | QF | DNQ | — | — | Mark Baena ♦ | 24 |
| 1999 | A-League | 2 | Pacific | 28 | 16 | 8 | — | 3 | 1 | 56 | 36 | +20 | 81 (Note: From 1999 to 2002, the A-League awarded a bonus point to teams that scored three or more goals in a match. The Sounders earned 10 bonus points in 1999, 10 bonus points in 2000, 4 bonus points in 2001, and 14 bonus points in 2002.) | .643 | 3rd | 6th | QF | R3 | — | — | Mark Baena ♦ | 20 |
| 2000 | A-League | 2 | Western | 28 | 18 | 7 | 3 | — | — | 56 | 38 | +18 | 85 | .696 | 3rd | 4th | QF | R2 | — | — | Greg Howes ♦ | 17 |
| 2001 | A-League | 2 | Western | 26 | 13 | 12 | 1 | — | — | 40 | 39 | +1 | 57 | .519 | 5th | 12th | DNQ | R2 | — | — | Leighton O'Brien | 11 |
| 2002 | A-League | 2 | Western | 28 | 23 | 4 | 1 | — | — | 71 | 27 | +44 | 107 | .839 | 1st | 1st | QF | R3 | — | — | Brian Ching | 16 |
| 2003 | A-League | 2 | Western | 28 | 16 | 7 | 5 | — | — | 45 | 24 | +21 | 53 | .661 | 2nd | 3rd | SF | QF | — | — | Kyle Smith | 6 |
| 2004 | A-League | 2 | Western | 28 | 13 | 11 | 4 | — | — | 40 | 34 | +6 | 43 | .536 | 4th | 9th | RU | DNQ | — | — | Welton Melo | 5 |
| 2005 | USL-1 | 2 | — | 28 | 11 | 6 | 11 | — | — | 33 | 25 | +8 | 44 | .589 | — | 4th | W | R3 | — | — | Roger Levesque | 6 |
| 2006 | USL-1 | 2 | — | 28 | 11 | 13 | 4 | — | — | 42 | 48 | −6 | 37 | .464 | — | 7th | DNQ | R3 | — | — | Cam Weaver ♦ | 18 |
| 2007 | USL-1 | 2 | — | 28 | 16 | 6 | 6 | — | — | 37 | 23 | +14 | 54 | .679 | — | 1st | W | SF | — | — | Sébastien Le Toux ♦ | 10 |
| 2008 | USL-1 | 2 | — | 30 | 10 | 10 | 10 | — | — | 37 | 36 | +1 | 40 | .500 | — | 6th | QF | SF | — | — | Sébastien Le Toux | 14 |
