= 2003 USL A-League =

USL A-League -2003 Season-
- Season: 2003
- Teams: 19
- Champions: Charleston Battery (1st Title)
- Premiers: Milwaukee Wave United (1st Title)
- Matches: 266
- Goals: 754 (2.83 per match)
- Best Player: (Brazil) Thiago Martins, Pittsburgh Riverhounds
- Top goalscorer: (Brazil) Thiago Martins, Pittsburgh Riverhounds (22 goals)
- Best goalkeeper: (Canada) Greg Sutton, Montreal Impact

The 2003 USL A-League was an American Division II league run by the United Soccer League during the summer of 2003.

== League standings ==
=== Eastern Conference ===
==== Northeast Division ====
Pos	Team	Pld	W	D	L	GF	GA	GD	Pts
1	Montreal Impact	28	16	6	6	40	21	+19	54
2	Rochester Raging Rhinos	28	15	6	7	55	36	+19	51
3	Pittsburgh Riverhounds	28	15	4	9	50	41	+9	49
4	Syracuse Salty Dogs	28	11	5	12	42	38	+4	38
5	Toronto Lynx	28	11	4	13	29	38	−9	37

==== Southeast Division ====
Pos	Team	Pld	W	D	L	GF	GA	GD	Pts
1	Charleston Battery	28	15	7	6	41	27	+14	52
2	Virginia Beach Mariners	28	14	5	9	51	34	+17	47
3	Richmond Kickers	30	12	9	9	41	32	+9	43 (Note: 2 points deducted?)
4	Charlotte Eagles	28	6	7	15	29	59	−30	25
5	Atlanta Silverbacks	28	4	7	17	27	48	−21	19

=== Western Conference ===
==== Central Division ====
Pos	Team	Pld	W	D	L	GF	GA	GD	Pts
1	Milwaukee Wave United	28	18	0	10	61	32	+29	54
2	Minnesota Thunder	28	17	2	9	44	28	+16	53
3	El Paso Patriots	28	9	3	16	33	48	−15	30
4	Cincinnati Riverhawks	28	9	0	19	38	62	−24	24 (Note: 3 points deducted?)
5	Indiana Blast	28	3	2	23	28	67	−39	11

==== Pacific Division ====
Pos	Team	Pld	W	D	L	GF	GA	GD	Pts
1	Seattle Sounders	28	16	5	7	45	24	+21	53
2	Vancouver Whitecaps	28	15	7	6	45	24	+21	52
3	Portland Timbers	28	15	2	11	39	33	+6	47
4	Calgary Storm	28	4	3	21	16	62	−46	15

== Playoffs ==
=== Bracket ===
Division finals
S1	Charleston Battery	0	4	4
S2	Virginia Beach Mariners	1	1	2
Eastern Conference
N1	Montreal Impact	1	0	1
N2	Rochester Raging Rhinos	2	0	2
C2	Minnesota Thunder (a.e.t.)	0	2	3
C1	Milwaukee Wave United	1	0	1
Western Conference
P2	Vancouver Whitecaps	0	1	1 (5)
P1	Seattle Sounders (p)	0	1	1 (6)

Conference finals
Charleston Battery	0	1	1
Rochester Rhinos	0	0	0
Minnesota Thunder	1	1	2
Seattle Sounders	0	0	0

Final
Charleston Battery	3
Minnesota Thunder	0

=== Division finals ===
==== Northeast Division ====
September 5, 2003
7:35 PM (EDT)

Rochester Rhinos (NY)	2–1	Montreal Impact (SC)
Ian Fuller (red card) 6'; Stoian Mladenov 8' (pen.); Doug Miller 50'; Kirk Wilson (yellow card) 90'	Report	(red card) 6' Nevio Pizzolitto; 84' Zé Roberto

Frontier Field, Rochester, New York
Attendance: 8,339
Referee: Ken Heller (USA)

September 7, 2003
4:00 PM (EDT)

Montreal Impact (SC)	0–0	Rochester Rhinos (NY)
Zé Roberto (yellow card) 4'; Martin Nash (yellow card) 63' (yellow-red card) 90'; Abraham Francois (yellow card) 89'	Report	(yellow card) 15' Scott Schweitzer; (yellow card) 65' Yuri Lavrinenko; (yellow card) 72' Kirk Wilson; (yellow card) 81' David Hayes

Complexe sportif Claude-Robillard, Montreal, Quebec
Attendance: 8,445
Referee: Silviu Petrescu (Canada)

The Rochester Rhinos advance 2 – 1 on aggregate.

==== Southeast Division ====
September 5, 2003

Virginia Beach Mariners (VA)	1–0	Charleston Battery (SC)
Roy Lassiter 18'; Stephen Danbusky (yellow card) 75'	Report

Virginia Beach Sportsplex, Virginia Beach, Virginia
Attendance: 3,200
Referee: Dan Stead (USA)

September 7, 2003
6:00 PM (EDT)

Charleston Battery (SC)	4–1	Virginia Beach Mariners (VA)
Chris Goos 3'; Josh Henderson 14', 71'; Russell Hutchison 17' (o.g.)	Report	10' Hamisi Amani-Dove; (yellow card) 37' Roland Vargas-Aguilera; (yellow card) 58' Stephen Danbusky

Blackbaud Stadium, Charleston, South Carolina
Attendance: 2,031
Referee: Todd Perry (USA)

The Charleston Battery advance 4 – 2 on aggregate.

==== Central Division ====
September 5, 2003

Milwaukee Wave United (WI)	1–0	Minnesota Thunder (MN)
Greg Howes 14' (pen.); Chris Morman (yellow card) 78'	Report	(yellow card) 54' Steve Shak

Uihlein Soccer Park, Milwaukee, Wisconsin
Attendance: 1,927
Referee: Cien Asoera (USA)

September 7, 2003
5:30 PM (CDT)

Minnesota Thunder (MN)	2–0 (OT)	Milwaukee Wave United (WI)
Johnny Torres 62', 92'	Report	(yellow card) 84' Todd Dusosky

National Sports Center, Blaine, Minnesota
Attendance: 2,649
Referee: Brent Sorg (USA)

The Minnesota Thunder advance 2 – 1 on aggregate.

==== Pacific Division ====
September 5, 2003
7:00 (PDT)

Seattle Sounders (WA)	0–0	Vancouver Whitecaps (BC)
Marco Vélez (yellow card) 14'; Scott Jenkins (yellow card) 15'; Ryan Edwards (yellow card) 34'	Report	(yellow card) 35' Carlo Corazzin; (yellow card) 87' Ollie Heald; (yellow card) 90' Paul Dailly

Seahawks Stadium, Seattle, Washington
Attendance: 2,178
Referee: Cory Dean (Canada)

September 7, 2001
3:00 PM (PDT)

Vancouver Whitecaps (BC)	1–1 (a.e.t.)	Seattle Sounders (WA)
Jean Piette (yellow card) 11'; Dave Morris 90'; Steve Kindel (yellow card) 117'	Report	2' Roger Levesque; (yellow card) 4' Chad Brown; (yellow card) 18' Andrew Gregor; (yellow card) 77' Zach Scott; (yellow card) 78' Darren Sawatzky
Penalties
Ollie Heald (penalty scored); Tiarnan King (penalty scored); Chris Franks (penalty scored); Carlo Corazzin (penalty scored); Dave Morris (penalty scored); Jeff Clarke (penalty missed)	5–6	(penalty scored) Kyle Smith; (penalty scored) Chad Brown; (penalty scored) Darren Sawatzky; (penalty scored) Herculez Gomez; (penalty scored) Andrew Gregor; (penalty scored) Viet Nguyen

Swangard Stadium, Burnaby, British Columbia
Attendance: 5,175
Referee: Hu Lui (USA)

The Seattle Sounders advance 1 – 0 on aggregate.

=== Conference finals ===
==== Eastern Conference final ====
September 12, 2003
8:00 PM (EDT)

Rochester Rhinos (NY)	0–0	Charleston Battery (SC)
	Report

Frontier Field, Rochester, New York
Attendance: 10,017
Referee: Andrew Chapin (USA)

September 14, 2003
6:00 PM (EDT)

Charleston Battery (SC)	1–0	Rochester Rhinos (NY)
Josh Henderson 41'	Report	(yellow card) 41' Ian Fuller

Blackbaud Stadium, Charleston, South Carolina
Attendance: 2,571
Referee: Brian D'Amato (USA)

The Charleston Battery advance 1 – 0 on aggregate.

==== Western Conference final ====
September 12, 2003
7:00 PM (PDT)

Seattle Sounders (WA)	0–1	Minnesota Thunder (MN)
Andrew Gregor (yellow card) 9'; Zach Scott (yellow card) 53'; Scott Jenkins (yellow card) 57'; Chad Brown (yellow card) 59'	Report	79' Steve Shak

Seahawks Stadium, Seattle, Washington
Attendance: 3,190
Referee: Ricardo Valenzuela (USA)

September 14, 2003
6:00 PM (CDT)

Minnesota Thunder (MN)	1–0	Seattle Sounders (WA)
Johnny Torres 59'; Duncan Tarley (yellow card) 90'	Report	(yellow card) 8' Viet Nguyen; (yellow card) 23' Ryan Edwards; (yellow card) 85' Craig Tomlinson

National Sports Center, Blaine, Minnesota
Attendance: 2,612
Referee: Terry Vaughn (USA)

The Minnesota Thunder advance 2 – 0 on aggregate.

=== Final ===
September 20, 2003
7:00 PM (EDT)

Charleston Battery (SC)	3–0	Minnesota Thunder (MN)
Ted Chronopoulos 13'; Terry Phelan (yellow card) 15'; Paul Conway 21'; John Wilson (yellow card) 32'; Steve Klein 37'

Blackbaud Stadium, Charleston, South Carolina
Attendance: 5,711
Referee: Jair Marrufo (USA)

== Points leaders ==
Rank	Scorer	Club	GP	Goals	Assists	Points
1	(Brazil) Thiago Martins	Pittsburgh Riverhounds	25	22	7	51
2	(United States) Doug Miller	Rochester Rhinos	28	17	4	38
3	(United States) Dante Washington	Virginia Beach Mariners	26	18	1	37
4	(United States) Greg Howes	Milwaukee Wave United	28	11	12	34
5	(United States) Todd Dusosky	Milwaukee Wave United	26	11	7	29
5	(Bolivia) Roland Vargas-Aguilera	Virginia Beach Mariners	26	10	9	29
5	(Trinidad and Tobago) Kevin Jeffrey	Richmond Kickers	27	10	9	29
8	(United States) Josh Henderson	Charleston Battery	20	10	5	25
8	(Mexico) Byron Alvarez	Portland Timbers	21	12	1	25
8	(United States) McKinley Tennyson	Portland Timbers	27	11	3	25
11	(Brazil) Lourenço Andrade	El Paso Patriots	20	9	4	22
11	(North Macedonia) Dino Delevski	Milwaukee Wave United	23	8	6	22

== Awards and All A-League Teams ==
All A-League First Team
F: (Brazil) Thiago Martins (Pittsburgh Riverhounds) (MVP & Leading Goalscorer); (United States) Doug Miller (Rochester Raging Rhinos); (United States) Dante Washington (Virginia Beach Mariners)
M: (Bolivia) Roland Aguilera (Virginia Beach Mariners); (United States) Marco Ferruzzi (Minnesota Thunder); (United States) Andrew Gregor (Seattle Sounders); (Brazil) Ricardo Villar (Pittsburgh Riverhounds)
D: (Canada) Gabriel Gervais (Montreal Impact) (Defender of the Year); (England) Danny Jackson (Seattle Sounders); (United States) John Wilson (Charleston Battery)
G: (Canada) Greg Sutton (Montreal Impact) (Goalkeeper of the Year)
Coach: (United States) Bob Lilley, Montreal Impact) (Coach of the Year)

All A-League Second Team
F: (Mexico) Byron Alvarez (Portland Timbers); (United States) Greg Howes (Milwaukee Wave United); (Trinidad and Tobago) Kevin Jeffrey (Richmond Kickers)
M: (United States) Ted Chronopoulos (Charleston Battery); (Canada) Ollie Heald (Vancouver Whitecaps); (Brazil) Zé Roberto (Montreal Impact); (United States) David Testo (Richmond Kickers)
D: (United States) Scott Schweitzer (Rochester Raging Rhinos); (United States) Steve Shak (Minnesota Thunder); (United States) Alan Woods (Atlanta Silverbacks)
G: (United States) Rich Cullen (Seattle Sounders)
