= 2002 U.S. Open Cup =

2002 Lamar Hunt U.S. Open Cup
Tournament details
- Country: United States

Final positions
- Champions: Columbus Crew (1st title)
- Runners-up: Los Angeles Galaxy
- 2003 CONCACAF Champions' Cup: Columbus Crew

Tournament statistics
- Top goal scorer(s): Johnny Menyongar (4 goals)

The 2002 U.S. Open Cup was the 89th edition of the Lamar Hunt U.S. Open Cup was a club soccer tournament in the United States open to all men's teams in the country. It was organized by the United States Soccer Federation (USSF) and featured 32 teams. The tournament ran from June to October.

The Columbus Crew won the Open Cup with a 1–0 victory over the defending-champion Los Angeles Galaxy in the final at Columbus Crew Stadium. Just three days before, Los Angeles had won MLS Cup 2002; Columbus was the MLS Supporters' Shield champion.

Every third-round game featured an MLS team against an A-League squad. Although the MLS teams won seven of the eight games, four went to overtime, including San Jose's memorable 4–3 win over Seattle. The Des Moines Menace turned in the best performance by a PDL team, taking Rochester to overtime in a 3-2 second-round loss.

== Open Cup Bracket ==
Home teams listed on top of bracket

Second Round
D3	South Jersey Barons	0
A-L	Hampton Roads Mariners	1
PDL	Raleigh CASL Elite	0
A-L	Richmond Kickers	3
A-L	Milwaukee Rampage	4
D3	New York Freedom	0
A-L	Rochester Rhinos (ASDET)	3
PDL	Des Moines Menace	2
D3	Utah Blitzz	1
A-L	Seattle Sounders	2
A-L	Minnesota Thunder	6
PDL	San Diego Gauchos	1
A-L	Atlanta Silverbacks	2
PDL	Memphis Express	0
D3	Greenville Lions	0
A-L	Charleston Battery	3

Third Round
A-L	Hampton Roads Mariners	0
MLS	MetroStars	1
MLS	Columbus Crew	3
A-L	Richmond Kickers	0
A-L	Milwaukee Rampage	1
MLS	Chicago Fire	0
A-L	Rochester Rhinos (ASDET)	2
MLS	Kansas City Wizards	3
A-L	Seattle Sounders	3
MLS	San Jose Earthquakes (ASDET)	4
A-L	Minnesota Thunder	0
MLS	Los Angeles Galaxy	4
A-L	Atlanta Silverbacks	1
MLS	Dallas Burn (ASDET)	2
A-L	Charleston Battery	0
MLS	Colorado Rapids (ASDET)	1

Quarterfinals
MLS	MetroStars	1
MLS	Columbus Crew	2
A-L	Milwaukee Rampage	0
MLS	Kansas City Wizards	2
MLS	San Jose Earthquakes	0
MLS	Los Angeles Galaxy (ASDET)	1
MLS	Dallas Burn (ASDET)	1
MLS	Colorado Rapids	0

Semifinals
MLS	Columbus Crew (ASDET)	3
MLS	Kansas City Wizards	2
MLS	Los Angeles Galaxy	4
MLS	Dallas Burn	1

Finals
MLS	Columbus Crew	1
MLS	Los Angeles Galaxy	0

== Schedule ==
Note: Scorelines use the standard U.S. convention of placing the home team on the right-hand side of box scores.

=== First round ===
Seven D3 Pro League, five PDL, and four USASA teams start.

June 9, 2002	Real Madrid (Texas) (USASA)	1–3	Greenville Lions (D3 Pro)	Greenville, South Carolina
	Marlon Irias 22'	(Report)	Jerome Lee Yaw 20', 31', 69'	Stadium: Sirrine Stadium; Attendance: -- Referee: John Frey (USA)

June 9, 2002	South Jersey Barons (D3 Pro)	4–0	Vereinigung Erzgebirge (USASA)	Doylestown, Pennsylvania
	James Harvey; Kevin Griffin; Gary Williams; Matt Miles	(Report)		Stadium: Vereinigung Erzgebirge Soccer Club; Attendance: -- Referee: Stanford Nagle (USA)

June 11, 2002	Carolina Dynamo (D3 Pro)	2–5	Raleigh CASL Elite (PDL)	Cary, North Carolina
	Mario Benjamin 28'; Lester Felician 60'	(Report)	Matt Crawford 6'; Michael Karim 36'; Logan Pause 70'; Trevor Perea 79'; Ryan Kneipper 86'	Stadium: SAS Stadium; Attendance: 815; Referee: Charles Mitchell (USA)

June 11, 2002	New Jersey Stallions (D3 Pro)	1–3	Des Moines Menace (PDL)	Des Moines, Iowa
	Júlio Santos 53' (pen)	(Report)	Tomas Boltnar 45', 48'; Matt Nickell 62'	Stadium: Cara McGrane Stadium; Attendance: 2,780; Referee: Terry Vaughn (USA)

June 11, 2002 (forfeit)	Mexico SC (USASA)	0–2 / f	San Diego Gauchos (D3 Pro)	Chula Vista, California
		(Report)		Stadium: Stan Canaris Stadium; Attendance: -- Referee: -- (USA)
Note: San Diego was awarded a 2–0 victory due to an ineligible player for Mexico SC. The match was originally a 2–2 draw with a 6–5 victory on penalty kicks for Mexico SC.

June 12, 2002	Utah Blitzz (D3 Pro)	2–0	Chico Rooks (PDL)	Chico, California
	Sterling Wescott 5', 90'	(Report)		Stadium: University Soccer Stadium; Attendance: -- Referee: David Bragg (USA)

June 12, 2002	AAC Eagles (USASA)	0–1 (asdet)	New York Freedom (D3 Pro)	Queens, New York
		(Report)	Shalrie Joseph 119'	Stadium: St. John's University; Attendance: -- Referee: John Konstantinidis (USA)

June 12, 2002	Memphis Express (PDL)	2–0	Texas Spurs (PDL)	Richardson, Texas
	Tony Kuhn 67', 84'	(Report)		Stadium: UT-Dallas; Attendance: -- Referee: Troy Travis (USA)

=== Second round ===
Eight A-League teams enter.

June 25, 2002	Seattle Sounders (A-League)	2–1	Utah Blitzz (D3 Pro)	Salt Lake City, Utah
	Leighton O'Brien 61' (pen); Greg Foisie 81'	(Report)	Jorge Estrada 89'	Stadium: Cottonwood High School; Attendance: -- Referee: Cory Dean (USA)

June 26, 2002	San Diego Gauchos (D3 Pro)	1–6	Minnesota Thunder (A-League)	Blaine, Minnesota
	Ralph Dartt 58'	(Report)	Johnny Menyongar 24', 32', 77', 89'; Johnny Torres 64'; Zafer Kilickan 75'	Stadium: National Sports Center; Attendance: 4,789; Referee: Robert Petersen (USA)

June 26, 2002	Memphis Express (PDL)	0–2	Atlanta Silverbacks (A-League)	Clarkston, Georgia
		(Report)	John Barry Nusum 22', 78'	Stadium: DeKalb Memorial Stadium; Attendance: -- Referee: Brian D'Amato (USA)

June 26, 2002	Charleston Battery (A-League)	3–0	Greenville Lions (D3 Pro)	Greenville, South Carolina
	Steve Klein 58'; John Jones 61'; Raúl Díaz Arce 68'	(Report)		Stadium: Sirrine Stadium; Attendance: 200; Referee: Roni Canales (USA)

June 26, 2002	Des Moines Menace (PDL)	2–3 (asdet)	Rochester Raging Rhinos (A-League)	Rochester, New York
	Tomas Boltnar 35'; Edward Child 70'	(Report)	Kirk Wilson 2'; Martin Nash 21'; Lenin Steenkamp 93'	Stadium: Frontier Field; Attendance: 8,485; Referee: Islam Sallaj (USA)

June 26, 2002	New York Freedom (D3 Pro)	0–4	Milwaukee Rampage (A-League)	Franklin, Wisconsin
		(Report)	Angel Rivillo 54'; Jason Russell 70'; John Wolyniec 81'; Destin Makumbu 90'	Stadium: Milwaukee Rampage Sports Complex; Attendance: 2,241; Referee: Francisco Sanchez (USA)

June 26, 2002	Richmond Kickers (A-League)	3–0	Raleigh CASL Elite (PDL)	Cary, North Carolina
	Josh Henderson 40', 81'; Tony Williams 86'	(Report)		Stadium: SAS Stadium; Attendance: 347; Referee: Daniel Purak (USA)

June 26, 2002	Hampton Roads Mariners (A-League)	1–0	South Jersey Barons (D3 Pro)	Camden, New Jersey
	Richard Hansen 64'	(Report)		Stadium: Rutgers University; Attendance: -- Referee: William Guarini (USA)

=== Third round ===
Eight MLS teams enter.

July 16, 2002	MetroStars (MLS)	1–0	Hampton Roads Mariners (A-League)	Virginia Beach, Virginia
	Rodrigo Faria 76'	(Report)		Stadium: Virginia Beach Sportsplex; Attendance: 828; Referee: Mike Stutts (USA)

July 17, 2002	Richmond Kickers (A-League)	0–3	Columbus Crew (MLS)	Columbus, Ohio
		(Report)	Brian McBride 34' (pen); Dante Washington 68', 73'	Stadium: Crew Stadium; Attendance: 7,887; Referee: Misail Tsapos (USA)

July 17, 2002	Kansas City Wizards (MLS)	3–2 (asdet)	Rochester Raging Rhinos (A-League)	Webster, New York
	Darío Fabbro 86'; Igor Simutenkov 90'; Chris Brown 105'	(Report)	Temoc Suarez 6'; Kirk Wilson 63'	Stadium: Webster Municipal Stadium; Attendance: 4,665; Referee: Kevin Barci (USA)

July 17, 2002	Chicago Fire (MLS)	0–1	Milwaukee Rampage (A-League)	Franklin, Wisconsin
		(Report)	Ranko Golijanin 54'	Stadium: Milwaukee Rampage Sports Complex; Attendance: 5,323; Referee: Marcel Yonan (USA)

July 17, 2002	San Jose Earthquakes (MLS)	4–3 (asdet)	Seattle Sounders (A-League)	Seattle, Washington
	Ronnie Ekelund 30', 78' (pen); Dwayne De Rosario 39'; Ariel Graziani 120'	(Report)	Andrew Gregor 11'; Scott Jenkins 58'; Brian Ching 60'	Stadium: Interbay Stadium; Attendance: 1,275; Referee: Cory Dean (USA)

July 17, 2002	Los Angeles Galaxy (MLS)	4–0	Minnesota Thunder (A-League)	Blaine, Minnesota
	Alejandro Moreno 18'; Chris Albright 26'; Carlos Ruiz 59'; Chris Albright 70'	(Report)		Stadium: National Sports Center; Attendance: 5,154; Referee: Sean O'Grady (USA)

July 17, 2002	Dallas Burn (MLS)	2–1 (asdet)	Atlanta Silverbacks (A-League)	Clarkston, Georgia
	Antonio Martínez 82', 102'	(Report)	Velco Iotov 18'	Stadium: DeKalb Memorial Stadium; Attendance: 1,731; Referee: Robert Mann (USA)

July 17, 2002	Colorado Rapids (MLS)	1–0 (asdet)	Charleston Battery (A-League)	Charleston, South Carolina
	John Spencer 98'	(Report)		Stadium: Blackbaud Stadium; Attendance: 4,125; Referee: Brian Poeschel (USA)

=== Quarterfinals ===
August 7, 2002	Columbus Crew (MLS)	2–1	MetroStars (MLS)	Uniondale, New York
	Brian McBride 34'; Kyle Martino 46'	(Report)	Rodrigo Faria 49'	Stadium: Mitchel Athletic Complex; Attendance: 8,314; Referee: Brian Poeschel (USA)

August 7, 2002	Los Angeles Galaxy (MLS)	1–0 (asdet)	San Jose Earthquakes (MLS)	San Jose, California
	Carlos Ruiz 101'	(Report)		Stadium: Spartan Stadium; Attendance: 6,481; Referee: Terry Vaughn (USA)

August 7, 2002	Colorado Rapids (MLS)	0–1 (asdet)	Dallas Burn (MLS)	Dallas, Texas
		(Report)	Ronnie O'Brien 111'	Stadium: Cotton Bowl; Attendance: 1,301; Referee: Jair Marrufo (USA)

August 24, 2002	Kansas City Wizards (MLS)	2–0	Milwaukee Rampage (A-League)	Franklin, Wisconsin
	Eric Quill 1'; Preki 21'	(Report)		Stadium: Milwaukee Rampage Sports Complex; Attendance: 6,576; Referee: Jesse Johnson (USA)

=== Semifinals ===
September 3, 2002	Dallas Burn (MLS)	1–4	Los Angeles Galaxy (MLS)	Fullerton, California
	Ronald Cerritos 89'	(Report)	Carlos Ruiz 11'; Mauricio Cienfuegos 17'; Cobi Jones 34'; Simon Elliott 81'	Stadium: Titan Stadium; Attendance: 3,132; Referee: Kevin Stott (USA)

September 10, 2002	Kansas City Wizards (MLS)	2–3 (asdet)	Columbus Crew (MLS)	Columbus, Ohio
	Chad McCarty 2' (og); Chris Brown 62'	(Report)	Edson Buddle 76'; John Wilmar Perez 90'; John Wilmar Perez 108'	Stadium: Crew Stadium; Attendance: 2,103; Referee: Casey Frankewicz (USA)

=== Final ===
October 24, 2002

Los Angeles Galaxy (MLS)	0–1	Columbus Crew (MLS)
	(Report)	Freddy García 30'

Crew Stadium
Columbus, Ohio
Attendance: 6,054
Referee: Brian Hall (USA)

Los Angeles Galaxy	Columbus Crew

== Top scorers ==
Position	Player	Club	Goals
1	Johnny Menyongar	Minnesota Thunder	4
2	Carlos Ruiz	Los Angeles Galaxy	3
	Tomas Boltnar	Des Moines Menace	3
	Jerome Lee Yaw	Greenville Lions	3

== See also ==
- 2002 National Amateur Cup
