= Ollie Heald =

Canadian former soccer player (born 1975)

Personal information
- Full name: Oliver Richard Heald
- Date of birth: 13 March 1975 (age 51)
- Place of birth: Vancouver, British Columbia, Canada
- Height: 6 ft 0 in (1.83 m)
- Positions: Midfielder; forward

Youth career
- 1992–1993: Norvan

Senior career*
Years	Team	Apps	(Gls)
1993–1995	Port Vale	0	(0)
1995–1996	Scarborough	9	(1)
1996–1998	Vancouver 86ers		
1999	Seattle Sounders		
2000	Vancouver 86ers		
2001–2004	Vancouver Whitecaps		

International career
1990–1991	Canada U16	2	(0)
1994–1996	Canada U23	14	(0)
Medal record
Men's soccer
Representing Canada
CONCACAF Men's Olympic Qualifying Championship
Silver medal – second place	1996 Canada	team
- * Club domestic league appearances and goals

Oliver Richard Heald (born 13 March 1975) is a Canadian former professional soccer player.

He signed with English club Port Vale in September 1993 but never made a first-team appearance before moving on to Scarborough in May 1995. The next year, he returned to his hometown club, the Vancouver 86ers. He spent the next eight years in the A-League with the club, other than a brief spell with the Seattle Sounders in 1999. His only success with the club was when they topped the Western Conference table in 2000.

== Career ==
=== England ===
Heald joined Port Vale, initially on trial, in September 1993, before he was offered a contract by manager John Rudge. He had first enquired about joining an English club after going on vacation to visits relatives there the previous year. The "Valiants" won promotion out of the Second Division in 1993–94 and competed in the First Division in 1994–95, though Heald never made a league appearance at Vale Park. He left on a free transfer to Ray McHale's Scarborough in the Third Division in May 1995. He only started three games for the "Seadogs" in 1995–96, but made eleven substitute appearances, scoring twice in all competitions.

=== Canada ===
Heald returned to his hometown in Canada to play for the Vancouver 86ers, who were competing in the A-League. The club failed to reach the playoffs in 1996, but reached the Conference final in 1997, where they were beaten by the Milwaukee Rampage following a penalty shoot-out. They reached the quarter-finals in 1998, where they lost to the San Diego Flash. He spent the 1999 season with the Seattle Sounders, who lost out to the San Diego Flash at the semi-final stage; Heald was sent off in the game. He returned to Vancouver, who would lose to the Minnesota Thunder in the semi-finals in 2000. Now called the Whitecaps, they won the Western Conference in 2001, but lost to the Hershey Wildcats in the playoff semi-finals. In 2002, they reached the Conference final but lost to the Milwaukee Rampage after extra time. The next year, they lost to the Seattle Sounders in the division final following a penalty shoot-out; Heald successfully converted his penalty but Jeff Clarke's miss proved to be fatal. The 2004 season was the last of the A-League's existence, and the Whitecaps lost again to the Seattle Sounders in the Conference final.

== Career statistics ==
Appearances and goals by club, season and competition
Club	Season	League			FA Cup		Other		Total	
Club	Season	Division	Apps	Goals	Apps	Goals	Apps	Goals	Apps	Goals
Port Vale	1993–94	Second Division	0	0	0	0	0	0	0	0
Port Vale	1994–95	First Division	0	0	0	0	0	0	0	0
Port Vale	Total		0	0	0	0	0	0	0	0
Scarborough	1995–96	Third Division	9	1	1	0	4	1	14	2

== Honours ==
Vancouver Whitecaps

- A-League Western Conference: 2000
