= Kevin Knight (soccer) =

American soccer player

Personal information
- Date of birth: October 22, 1976 (age 50)
- Place of birth: Fairfax, Virginia, U.S.
- Height: 6 ft 1 in (1.85 m)
- Position: Defender

College career
| Years | Team | Apps | (Gls) |
| 1995–1998 | James Madison Dukes | | |

Senior career*
| Years | Team | Apps | (Gls) |
| 1999 | MetroStars | 11 | (0) |
| 1999 | → Long Island Rough Riders (loan) | 1 | (0) |
| 2000–2008 | Richmond Kickers | 217 | (10) |
- * Club domestic league appearances and goals

Kevin Knight (born October 22, 1976) is an American former professional soccer player who played as a defender.

== Youth ==
Knight attended James Madison University where he played on the men's soccer team from 1995 to 1998.

== Professional ==
On February 6, 1999, the MetroStars drafted Knight in the second round (sixteenth overall) of the 1999 MLS College Draft. He saw time in eleven games before being waived on November 25, 1999. In 2000, Knight signed with the Richmond Kickers of the USL A-League. He spent eight seasons with the Kickers, retiring midway through the 2007 season in order to become a firefighter. In 2006, Knight and his teammates won the USL Second Division championship. In February 2008, Knight came out of retirement to rejoin the Kickers. He suffered from several injures and played in only five games before retiring permanently at the end of the season.

== Statistics ==
| Club performance | | | League | | Cup | | League Cup | | Continental | | Total | |
| Season | Club | League | Apps | Goals | Apps | Goals | Apps | Goals | Apps | Goals | Apps | Goals |
| USA | | | League | | Open Cup | | League Cup | | North America | | Total | |
|---|---|---|---|---|---|---|---|---|---|---|---|---|
| 1999 | MetroStars | MLS | 11 | 0 | 1 | 0 | 0 | 0 | 0 | 0 | 12 | 0 |
| 1999 | Long Island Rough Riders | USL A-League | 1 | 0 | 0 | 0 | 3 | 0 | 0 | 0 | 1 | 0 |
| 2000 | Richmond Kickers | USL A-League | 27 | 3 | 0 | 0 | 3 | 0 | 0 | 0 | 35 | 3 |
| 2001 | Richmond Kickers | USL A-League | 25 | 1 | 0 | 0 | 2 | 1 | 0 | 0 | 35 | 4 |
| 2002 | Richmond Kickers | USL A-League | 27 | 1 | 0 | 0 | 5 | 0 | 0 | 0 | 39 | 1 |
| 2003 | Richmond Kickers | USL A-League | 23 | 2 | 0 | 0 | 0 | 0 | 0 | 0 | 23 | 2 |
| 2004 | Richmond Kickers | USL A-League | 28 | 1 | 0 | 0 | 2 | 0 | 0 | 0 | 35 | 2 |
| 2005 | Richmond Kickers | USL First Division | 27 | 0 | 0 | 0 | 5 | 0 | 0 | 0 | 34 | 0 |
| 2006 | Richmond Kickers | USL Second Division | 12 | 1 | 0 | 0 | 5 | 0 | 0 | 0 | 15 | 1 |
| 2007 | Richmond Kickers | USL Second Division | 7 | 0 | 0 | 0 | 5 | 0 | 0 | 0 | 7 | 0 |
| 2008 | Richmond Kickers | USL Second Division | 4 | 0 | 0 | 0 | 5 | 0 | 0 | 0 | 5 | 0 |
| Career total | | | 11 | 0 | 1 | 0 | 0 | 0 | 0 | 0 | 12 | 0 |
