= Destinn =

Destinn may refer to:

- Emmy Destinn (1878–1930), Czech opera singer
- 6583 Destinn

== See also ==
- Destin (disambiguation)
