= Bobby Brennan (soccer) =

American soccer player

Personal information
- Full name: Robert Brennan
- Date of birth: April 14, 1979 (age 47)
- Place of birth: Northport, New York, U.S.
- Height: 6 ft 0 in (1.83 m)
- Position: Defender

Youth career
- 1997–2001: American Eagles

Senior career*
Years	Team	Apps	(Gls)
2002	Milwaukee Rampage	22	(1)
2004	Long Island Rough Riders	1	(0)
- * Club domestic league appearances and goals

Robert "Bobby" Brennan is an American retired soccer defender who played professionally in the USL A-League.

Brennan attended American University. He was a four-year starter. However, he was forced to redshirt the 2000 season after dislocating his shoulder early in the season. In February 2002, D.C. United selected Brennan in the fourth round (42nd overall) of the 2002 MLS SuperDraft. D.C. United released him during the pre-season and Brennan signed with the Milwaukee Rampage of the USL A-League. The Rampage won the 2002 A-League title. In 2004, he played one game with the Long Island Rough Riders of the USL Premier Development League.
