= Destin =

Destin may refer to:

- Destin (name)
- Destin, Florida, United States, city in Okaloosa County
- Destin Pipeline, a natural gas pipeline
- Destin (song), a French song recorded by Celine Dion
- Destin (film), a 1927 French silent film directed by Dimitri Kirsanoff
