= Jason Annicchero =

American soccer player (born 1975)

Personal information
- Date of birth: September 27, 1975 (age 51)
- Place of birth: Pleasanton, California, U.S.
- Height: 6 ft 4 in (1.93 m)
- Position: Defender

College career
Years	Team	Apps	(Gls)
1993–1996	Santa Clara Broncos		

Senior career*
Years	Team	Apps	(Gls)
1997	California Jaguars	20	(0)
1998–1999	Seattle Sounders	51	(1)
2000	San Diego Flash	25	(0)
2001–2002	Atlanta Silverbacks	44	(1)
Total		140	(2)
- * Club domestic league appearances and goals

Jason Annicchero (born September 27, 1975) is an American retired soccer defender who spent six seasons in A-League.

In 1993, Annicchero graduated from Amador Valley High School. He attended Santa Clara University where he was a 1996 Second Team All American. On February 1, 1997, the San Jose Clash selected Αnnicchero in the second round (fourteenth overall) of the 1997 MLS College Draft. Four days later, the Seattle Sounders picked him in the first round of the USISL A-League draft. Annicchero decided to remain in school to finish his bachelor's degree in business which led to the Clash releasing him. In June 1997, he signed with the California Jaguars where he played one season. In February 1998, he Annicchero moved to the Sounders. He spent two seasons with the Sounders. On April 8, 2000, Seattle traded him to the San Diego Flash for cash. In February 2001, he signed with the Atlanta Silverbacks. He played two seasons in Atlanta then retired.

In July 2019, Annicchero was recognized by the City of Pleasanton as an Employee of the Year.
