= Destin (name) =

Destin is a given name and a surname. Notable persons with the name include:

== Given name ==
- Destin Damachoua (born 1986), Central African-French basketball player
- Destin Daniel Cretton (born 1978), American film director, screenwriter, producer, and editor
- Destin Destine (1895-?), Haitian sport shooter
- Destin Hall (born 1987), American attorney and politician
- Destin Hood (born 1990), American MLB player
- Destin Makita (born 1984), Republic of the Congo football (soccer) player
- Destin Makumbu (born 1982), English former professional footballer
- Destin Onka Malonga (1988–2016), Congolese football (soccer) player
- Destin Route (born 1990), American rapper, known as JID
- Destin Sandlin (born 1981), American YouTube educator
- Destin Talbert (born 1999), American football player
