= Chad Brown (soccer) =

American soccer player (born 1975

Personal information
- Date of birth: September 1, 1975 (age 51)
- Place of birth: United States
- Height: 5 ft 9 in (1.75 m)
- Position: Midfielder

Youth career
- 1994: Bellevue Community College
- 1996: Spokane Falls Community College
- 1997–1998: Fresno State Bulldogs

Senior career*
| Years | Team | Apps | (Gls) |
| 1996–1999 | Spokane Shadow | | |
| 2000 | Seattle Sounders Select | | |
| 2000–2005 | Seattle Sounders | 83 | (1) |

Managerial career
- 2006–2009: UNLV Rebels (assistant)
- 2010: West Virginia Mountaineers (assistant)
- 2014–2016: Spokane Shadow
- * Club domestic league appearances and goals

Chad Brown is an American retired soccer midfielder who played six seasons with the Seattle Sounders in the USL First Division. He was the head coach of NPSL team Spokane Shadow.

== Player ==
In 1994, Brown played collegiate soccer at Bellevue Community College. In 1996, he played for Spokane Community College. In 1996, Brown spent the summer with the Spokane Shadow. In 1997, Brown transferred to Fresno State where he spent his last two seasons of collegiate eligibility. In 1999, Brown served as an assistant coach with Fresno State and played for the Spokane Shadow as he finished his degree in sociology. In 2000, Brown began the season with the Seattle Sounders Select before being called up to the Seattle Sounders first team in July. He remained with the Sounders through the 2005 season. That season, the Sounders won the USL First Division championship.

== Coach ==
In 1999, Brown served as a volunteer assistant coach with Fresno State while finishing his degree. When he retired from playing, he spent several years with the Crossfire Soccer Club in Redmond, Washington. In March 2006, the University of Nevada-Las Vegas hired Brown as an assistant coach. In March 2010, Brown became an assistant coach at the West Virginia University. In 2014, Brown was named head coach of Spokane Shadow.
