= Mike Franks (soccer) =

Canadian retired soccer player

Personal information
- Date of birth: 20 April 1977 (age 49)
- Place of birth: Edmonton, Alberta, Canada
- Height: 6 ft 5 in (1.96 m)
- Position: Goalkeeper

Youth career
- 1997: Vancouver Whitecaps

College career
Years	Team	Apps	(Gls)
- UBC Thunderbirds

Senior career*
Years	Team	Apps	(Gls)
1998	Vancouver 86ers	5	(0)
1998–2000	PSV Eindhoven		
1999	→ RBC Roosendaal (loan)		
2000–2001	Hibernian	2	(0)
2003–2005	Vancouver Whitecaps	43	(0)
- Vancouver Firemen

International career
1997	Canada U20	4	(0)
1998–2000	Canada U23	9	(0)
- * Club domestic league appearances and goals

Michael Franks (born 20 April 1977) is a Canadian retired soccer player who has played professionally in North America, the Netherlands, and Scotland.

== Career ==
=== Club career ===
Franks has played professionally for the Vancouver 86ers, PSV Eindhoven, RBC Roosendaal and Hibernian.

=== International career ===
Franks never earned a full cap for the Canada men's national soccer team, although he was a squad member for a number of competitions including the 2001 FIFA Confederations Cup and 2005 CONCACAF Gold Cup. He also earned youth caps.

== Personal ==
He is the younger brother of Chris Franks.
