= Khary Stockton =

American soccer player and coach

Personal information
- Date of birth: September 15, 1971 (age 55)
- Place of birth: Alexandria, Virginia, United States
- Height: 6 ft 0 in (1.83 m)
- Position: Midfielder

College career
Years	Team	Apps	(Gls)
1989–1992	William & Mary Tribe		

Senior career*
Years	Team	Apps	(Gls)
1993	Richmond Kickers	6	(3)
1993	Atlético Sorocaba		
1994	A.E. Velo Clube		
1995	Richmond Kickers	18	(2)
1996	Milwaukee Rampage		(4)
1997	Carolina Dynamo	27	(1)
1998	New Orleans Storm	21	(8)
1999	Lehigh Valley Steam	26	(5)
2000	Northern Virginia Royals	14	(2)
2001	Milwaukee Rampage	17	(0)
2002–2003	Richmond Kickers	52	(0)

Managerial career
- Catholic University Cardinals (assistant)
- 2007–2011: District of Columbia Firebirds
- * Club domestic league appearances and goals

Khary Stockton (born September 15, 1971, in Alexandria, Virginia) is a retired U.S. soccer midfielder who spent his entire career in the lower U.S. and Brazilian divisions. From 2007-2011, he was the head coach of the University of the District of Columbia.

== Career ==
Stockton attended the College of William and Mary, playing on the men's soccer team from 1989 to 1992. He graduated with a bachelor's degree in anthropology in 1993. That year, he began his professional career with the newly established Richmond Kickers in the USISL. He played six games, scored three goals and then moved to Brazil. In September 1993, he signed with Atlético Sorocaba in the Brazilian Third Division. On May 27, 1994, he joined A.E. Velo Clube in the Brazilian Second Division. In 1995, he moved back to the United States where he rejoined the Kickers who went on to win the 1995 U.S. Open Cup. On February 8, 1996, the MetroStars selected Stockton in the 12th round of the 1996 MLS Inaugural Player Draft. On March 26, 1996, the MetroStars waived Stockton as part of a preseason roster reduction. He then moved to the Milwaukee Rampage. In 1997, he spent a single season with the Carolina Dynamo. He moved again for the 1998 season, this time to the New Orleans Storm before playing for the Lehigh Valley Steam in 1999. The Steam folded at the end of the season and he played for the Northern Virginia Royals in 2000. In 2001, he moved to the Milwaukee Rampage before finishing his career with the Richmond Kickers in 2002 and 2003.

Stockton spent three seasons as an assistant at The Catholic University of America. On July 16, 2007, he became the head coach at the University of the District of Columbia.
