= Viet Nguyen =

American soccer player and coach

Personal information
- Date of birth: August 6, 1975 (age 51)
- Place of birth: Dallas, Texas, U.S.
- Height: 5 ft 7 in (1.70 m)
- Position: Forward

College career
Years	Team	Apps	(Gls)
1994–1998	Washington Huskies		

Senior career*
Years	Team	Apps	(Gls)
1999–2004	Seattle Sounders	153	(14)
2011	Tacoma Stars (indoor)	7	(2)

International career
1994	United States U20		
- * Club domestic league appearances and goals

Viet Nguyen is an American retired soccer player who spent his entire professional career with the Seattle Sounders in the USL First Division. As of January 2019, Nguyen is the youth director for Pacific Northwest Soccer Club.

== Club career ==
Nguyen was born in Dallas, Texas from Vietnamese parents. He attended the University of Washington, playing on the men's soccer team in 1994 and 1995 and again in 1997 and 1998. He played sixty-nine games, scoring fifteen goals and adding eleven assists, during his four-year collegiate career. He graduated with a bachelor's degree in sociology. In 1999, the Seattle Sounders selected Nguyen in the territorial round of the A-League draft. Nguyen spent six seasons with the Sounders before retiring and entering the coaching ranks.

In 2011, he came out of retirement to play for the Tacoma Stars of the Professional Arena Soccer League.

== International career ==
In 1994, Nguyen played for the United States national under-20 team in the CONCACAF U-20 Tournament. The United States got eliminated in the group phase and failed to qualify for the 1995 FIFA World Youth Championship.
