= Cam Weaver =

American soccer player

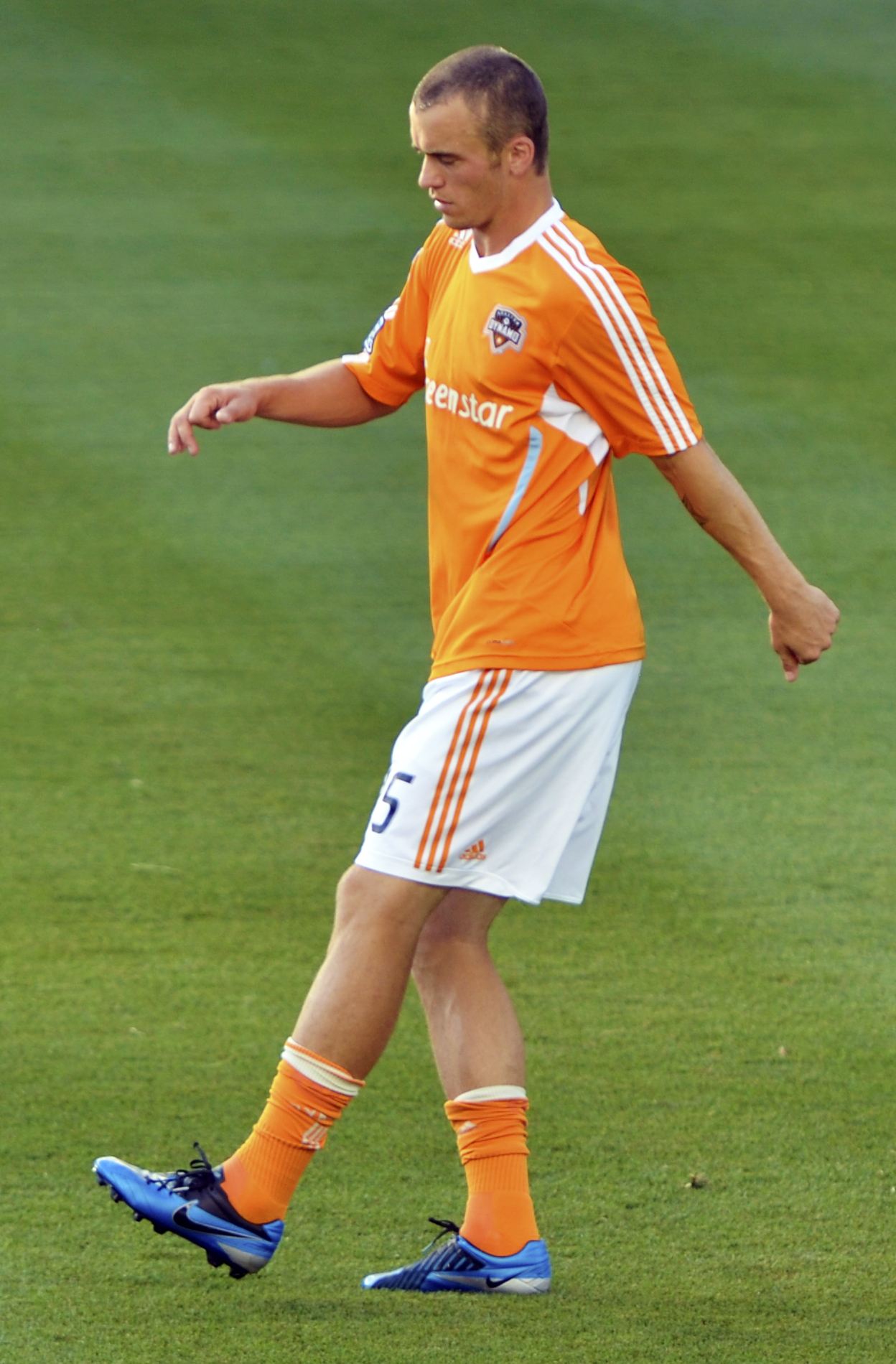
- Cam Weaver warming up at Livestrong Sporting Park in 2012

Personal information
- Full name: William Cameron Weaver
- Date of birth: June 10, 1983 (age 43)
- Place of birth: Kent, Washington, United States
- Height: 6 ft 4 in (1.93 m)
- Position: Forward

College career
| Years | Team | Apps | (Gls) |
| 2002–2003 | Skagit Valley Cardinals | | |
| 2004–2005 | Seattle Redhawks | 41 | (17) |

Senior career*
| Years | Team | Apps | (Gls) |
| 2005 | Kalamazoo Kingdom | 7 | (4) |
| 2006 | Seattle Sounders | 27 | (18) |
| 2007–2009 | Haugesund | 51 | (21) |
| 2009 | San Jose Earthquakes | 9 | (1) |
| 2009–2013 | Houston Dynamo | 81 | (12) |
| 2014 | Seattle Sounders FC | 3 | (0) |
| Total | | 178 | (56) |
- * Club domestic league appearances and goals as of March 8, 2015

William Cameron "Cam" Weaver (born June 10, 1983) is an American former professional soccer player.

== Career ==
=== High school and college ===
Weaver attended Kentwood High School in Covington, Washington, and played four years of college soccer at Skagit Valley College and Seattle University.

Weaver also played for the Kalamazoo Kingdom in the USL Premier Development League.

=== Professional ===
Weaver signed for the Seattle Sounders of the USL First Division in 2006. He became the league's co-leading scorer in his rookie season, a title he shared with Brazilian legend Romario of Miami FC. The scoring title earned him international recognition, and Weaver subsequently signed a three-year contract with Norwegian club Haugesund, for whom he subsequently scored 21 goals in 51 Adeccoligaen appearances.

In February 2009, Weaver joined the San Jose Earthquakes of Major League Soccer. On June 9, 2009, the Earthquakes traded Weaver to Houston Dynamo in exchange for forward Chris Wondolowski and a conditional pick in the 2010 MLS draft. He notched his first assist for the Dynamo in his first game with them on June 10, 2009, against Chivas USA. Three days later he scored for the first time with the Dynamo with a brace against FC Dallas to lead the team to a 3–1 win.

Cam signed to the Seattle Sounders FC in March 2014. He had three first team appearances. His option was declined for 2015.

On March 8, 2015, Weaver announced his retirement from professional soccer.

== Honors ==
=== Individual ===
- USL First Division Top Scorer: 2006
