= Dusty Hudock =

American soccer player (born 1972)

David Hudock
Personal information
- Full name: David Hudock
- Date of birth: September 4, 1972 (age 54)
- Place of birth: Cleveland, Ohio, United States
- Height: 6 ft 2 in (1.88 m)
- Position: Goalkeeper

Youth career
- Tucson Amigos

College career
Years	Team	Apps	(Gls)
1991–1993	Washington Huskies		

Senior career*
Years	Team	Apps	(Gls)
1994–1995	Seattle Sounders	6	(0)
1996	Colorado Rapids	9	(0)
1997–1998	Seattle Sounders	61	(0)
1998	→ Colorado Rapids (loan)	0	(0)
1998	→ Chicago Fire (loan)	0	(0)
1999	Miami Fusion	3	(0)
1999–2004	Charleston Battery	177	(0)
2005	Rochester Raging Rhinos	3	(0)
2006–2009	Charleston Battery	85	(0)
Total		344	(0)
- * Club domestic league appearances and goals

David "Dusty" Hudock (born September 4, 1972, in Cleveland, Ohio) is an American former professional soccer player who played as a goalkeeper. Hudock began his career in the APSL, playing primarily for the Seattle Sounders, before moving to the Charleston Battery of the A-League and USL First Division.

== Career ==
=== Youth and college ===
Hudock grew up in Phoenix, Arizona and played youth soccer for CISCO Arsenal. He played at the University of Washington from 1991 to 1993, where he was named to the All American Second Team in 1992 and 1993. He was also a member of the US soccer team at the 1991 World Student Games held in Sheffield. At some point during his collegiate career, Hudock also played for the Tucson Amigos of the USISL.

=== Professional ===
Hudock initially began playing soccer at the college level at the University of Washington, until turning professional by signing with the Seattle Sounders of the A-League in 1994. During his tenure with the Sounders, he primarily served as a backup for then starting goalie Marcus Hahnemann which resulted in minimal appearances for the young goalkeeper. Despite not recording much minutes on the field, he did receive his first piece of silverware as Seattle would become the A-League Champions in 1995. In 1996, the Colorado Rapids drafted Hudock in the second round of the 1996 MLS Inaugural Player Draft. At Colorado, he received the chance to experience being a starter during the commence of earlier part of the season, but was soon after replaced by Chris Woods, and returned to Seattle in 1997. Ironically soon after his release from Colorado, the club would sign his former teammate Hahnemann as his successor, which allowed Hudock to complete for a starting goalkeeper position in Seattle. Hudock superb performances during the 1997 campaign resulted in him to be awarded the A-League Goalkeeper of the Year award. After an exceptional showing at Seattle led him to be sign by the Chicago Fire on a loan, where it got Hudock a MLS championship.

In April 1998, he went on loan with the Colorado Rapids., while a late call-up during the playoffs by the Chicago Fire got Hudock an MLS championship ring as he was on the bench in the final.

During the time of the 1999 MLS draft it was presumed by many that Tampa Bay Mutiny would sign Hudock, but instead the team signed Scott Garlick. Dusty entered the MLS Draft and was picked up by the Miami Fusion. Hudock started the first three games of the season until usual starter Jeff Cassar returned from injury. Fusion waived Hudock, and he signed with the Charleston Battery on April 15, 1999.

In Charleston he earned a reputation for being a prime goalkeeper and an outstanding shot-stopper. His immense contributions brought Charleston to a great level of prestige among the league. During his tenure at Charleston he has established himself as the all-time leading goalkeeper for the Battery with 142 wins and a GAA of 1.04. His Battery records include 104 shutouts and 281 appearances (280 starts). He assisted the club by claiming their second A-League Championship and several Division titles; he was awarded for the second time in his career A-League Goalkeeper of the Year award in 2002. In February, 2010 he was ranked 16th in the USL First Division Top 25 of the Decade, which announced a list of the best and most influential players of the previous decade.

In 2000, he posted a career high season by recording 17 victories under his belt, as well receiving his first piece of silverware by winning the Division title. His 2002 season was exceptional, as he managed to finish as the league's leading goalkeeper with 13 shutouts that resulted in a GAA of 0.60. His remarkable season led to him being awarded the A-League Goalkeeper of the Year award, as well receiving the majority of his domestic club's team awards. Hudock would experience a tremendous season with Charleston in 2003, where he provided a pivotal role in the club's championship season. He recorded 11 shutouts that clinched the Southeast Division title and provided a playoff berth for the Battery. In the club's playoff round, Hudock posted three consecutive shutouts against the likes of the Rochester Rhinos, and including the final match against the Minnesota Thunder, which culminated in a 3-0 A-League Championship victory. For his dedication the club honoured him with the Charleston Battery MVP award for the second consecutive year in a row. The following season, Charleston produced a mediocre season because the majority of its championship winning squad went overseas to pursue new opportunities. Despite not making the post season, he led the club to the semifinals of the Lamar Hunt US Open Cup. In 2005, Hudock would pursue other club offers eventually signing with the Rochester Rhinos.

His tenure at Rochester met an unfavorable run for the goalkeeper, where he would primarily serve as a substitute to Scott Vallow. This prompted a return to South Carolina in 2006, where he was appointed club captain and once again played an important role in Charleston entry into the playoffs. In 2008, Hudock was part of the Charleston squad that made history in the US Open Cup, by becoming the second USL club in the MLS era of the tournament to reach the tournament championship, where their opponents were D.C. United. Unfortunately in the final, D.C. United came away with a 2–1 victory. During his time at the Battery he won the USL1 in 2003, Battery MVP 02,03,04 Battery defender of the year in 01 and 02 and USL Goalkeeper of the year in 02.

=== Coaching ===
Following his retirement Hudock settled in the Charleston area and has served as an assistant to Battery head coach Mike Anhaeuser in various capacities. As of 2015 Hudock is the head coach of the Battery's U-18 academy squad playing in the U.S. Soccer Development Academy.

== Honors ==
=== Club ===
Seattle Sounders A-League Champions 1995

==== Charleston Battery ====
- A-League Championship
  - Champions (1): 2003

=== Individual ===
- Charleston Battery MVP (3): 2002, 2003, 2004
- Charleston Battery Defender of the Year (2): 2001, 2002
- A-League
  - Goalkeeper of the Year (2): 1997, 2002
