= Nathan Watkins =

American soccer player

Nate Watkins
Personal information
- Full name: Nathan Watkins
- Date of birth: April 26, 1977 (age 49)
- Place of birth: Stone Mountain, Georgia, United States
- Height: 5 ft 11 in (1.80 m)
- Positions: Midfielder; defender

Youth career
- 1995–1998: South Carolina Gamecocks

Senior career*
Years	Team	Apps	(Gls)
1999–2005	Charlotte Eagles	135	(17)
- * Club domestic league appearances and goals

Nathan "Nate" Watkins is a retired American soccer player who played professionally in the USL A-League.

Watkins attended the University of South Carolina, playing on the men's soccer team from 1995 to 1998. In 1999, Watkins signed with the Charlotte Eagles. In 2001, the Eagles moved up to the USL A-League. In 2000 and 2005, the Eagles won the league championship. Watkins final season with Charlotte came in 2005.
