= Brian Piesner =

American soccer player

Personal information
- Date of birth: June 4, 1978 (age 48)
- Place of birth: Commack, New York, U.S.
- Height: 5 ft 9 in (1.75 m)
- Position: Midfielder

Youth career
- 1996–1999: Rutgers Scarlet Knights

Senior career*
Years	Team	Apps	(Gls)
1999	Central Jersey Riptide		
2000	Atlanta Silverbacks	27	(7)
2001	Charleston Battery	29	(2)
2002	Atlanta Silverbacks	25	(7)
2002	→ MetroStars (loan)	1	(0)
2002	→ Dallas Burn (loan)	0	(0)
- * Club domestic league appearances and goals

Brian Piesner is an American retired soccer midfielder who played professionally in Major League Soccer and the USISL A-League.

Piesner spent most of his early life on Long Island, New York. When he was fourteen, his family moved to Spring, Texas, where he played youth soccer with the Texans Soccer Club – Houston. His family moved to Southern California in 1994 where he attended Santa Margarita Catholic High School. He played on the Santa Margarita boys' team, graduating in 1996. He attended Rutgers University, where he played on the men's soccer team from 1996 to 1999. During the 1999 collegiate off season, Piesner played for the Central Jersey Riptide of the USL Premier Development League. On February 6, 2000, the Dallas Burn chose Piesner in the fourth round (forty-sixth overall) of the 2000 MLS SuperDraft. That year, the Atlanta Silverbacks selected Piesner in the first round (twenty-second overall) of the A-League draft. Piesner signed with the Burn but was released him on February 24 and he signed with the Silverbacks. On December 19, 2001, the Battery signed Pierson to a three-year contract. The Battery released him before the 2002 season and Pierson returned to the Silvebacks where he was a 2002 First Team All Star. On July 24, 2002, the Silverbacks loaned Piesner to the MetroStars. Piesner played a single minute in the MetroStars’ 3–1 victory over the Kansas City Wizards. In September 2002, he played for the Dallas Burn in their penalty kick victory over C.D. Olimpia in the New Orleans Saints Pan-American Life Cup.
