= Leighton O'Brien =

American soccer player

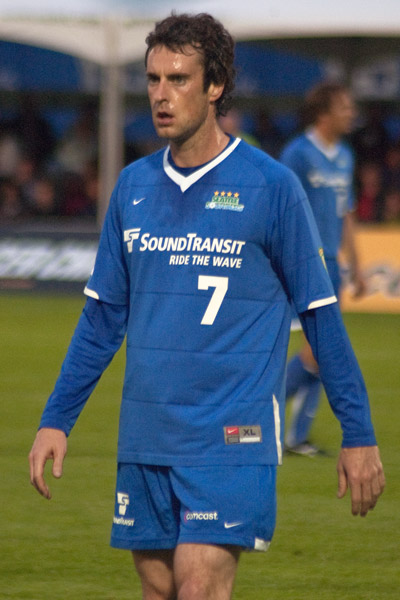

Personal information
- Date of birth: March 14, 1976 (age 50)
- Place of birth: Tacoma, Washington, United States
- Height: 5 ft 10 in (1.78 m)
- Position: Midfielder

Team information
- Current team: Pacific Northwest Soccer Club (Technical Director)

College career
Years	Team	Apps	(Gls)
1994–1998	San Diego Toreros		

Senior career*
Years	Team	Apps	(Gls)
1999	San Jose Clash	4	(0)
1999	→ MLS Pro-40 (loan)	7	(0)
2000	San Diego Flash	21	(0)
2001–2005	Seattle Sounders	53	(14)
2001	→ Sacramento Knights (loan - indoor)		
2002	→ San Jose Earthquakes (loan)	0	(0)
2002–2004	→ Milwaukee Wave (loan - indoor)	36	(19)
2003–2004	→ Bodens BK (loan)	35	(6)
2005	Real Salt Lake	6	(0)
2005	→ Seattle Sounders (loan)	14	(2)
2006–2008	Seattle Sounders	50	(10)
2009	Tacoma Tide	12	(0)
2009	Montreal Impact	7	(1)
2010–2012	Tacoma Stars (indoor)	19	(8)

Managerial career
- 2010–2011: Seattle Sounders Women
- * Club domestic league appearances and goals

Leighton O'Brien (born March 14, 1976) is an American soccer player who is serving as the Technical Director for the Pacific Northwest Soccer Club.

O'Brien is noted most significantly for his tenure with the Seattle Sounders of the USL First Division, where the Tacoma native helped the Sounders claim the double, and as well as several other titles. Most of his personal achievements derived from his time with Seattle. In February, 2010 he was ranked 11th in the USL First Division Top 25 of the Decade, which announced a list of the best and most influential players of the previous decade.

== Career ==
=== Youth and college ===
Born in Tacoma, Washington, O'Brien grew up in the Pacific Northwest, graduating from Federal Way High School in 1994. He played college soccer at the University of San Diego, redshirting his freshman season after an early season injury sidelined him.

=== Professional ===
O'Brien was drafted by the New England Revolution in the third round of the 1999 MLS College Draft. He never played for the Revs before being waived on March 31, 1999. On April 5, 1999, the San Jose Clash claimed O'Brien in the waiver draft. He spent most of the season on loan with MLS Pro-40 and only four games with the Clash first team before being released at the end of the season. In 2000, he signed with the San Diego Flash of the USL A-League. At some point, he also played for the Sacramento Knights of the World Indoor Soccer League.

On April 30, 2001, Leighton signed with the Seattle Sounders, where he had a successful season by posting 11 goals and seven assists, All-League honors. Following the completion of the USL season, he signed with the Sacramento Knights of the World Indoor Soccer League for the remainder of their season. In 2002, the Sounders loaned him to the Clash. In 2002, he had another successful campaign with the Sounders where his 13 goals and 11 assists helped the Sounders claim the regular season championship. His efforts also earned him All-League recognition, Assist Leader honor, and was named the USL A-League MVP. He then signed on loan from the Sounders with the Milwaukee Wave of Major Indoor Soccer League for the 2002–03 season. He played two winter indoor seasons, 2002–03 and 2003–04 with the Wave. The Sounders signed O'Brien to a three-year contract before the 2003 season, but he played only three games in Seattle before moving on loan to Bodens BK in the Swedish Second Division. He played 23 games, scoring six goals and adding nine assists. In 2004, he returned to Boden for the 2004 season, but lost most of the season with a groin injury. On November 14, 2005, the Wave traded O'Brien's rights to the California Cougars in exchange for Pat White, but did not play for the Cougars.

On March 29, 2005, he signed with the expansion Real Salt Lake of Major League Soccer. At the time, he was still under contract with the Sounders. The Sounders released him to Salt Lake in exchange for the team to play an exhibition against Seattle. Salt Lake loaned O'Brien back to Seattle several times during the season before releasing him on August 19, 2005. O'Brien immediately signed with the Sounders. His free kick in the 2005 USL-1 Final started what would become Seattle Sounders tying goal. His kick was redirected twice before Maykel Galindo scored Seattle's goal in a 1–1 draw with Richmond Kickers. O'Brien then scored one of four penalty kicks for Seattle as they won the 2005 Championship in penalty kicks. Leighton signed back on with Seattle for the 2006 season, and in 2007, he helped the Sounders claim the double. He remained with the club for its final season as the team folded at the end of 2008 due to Seattle Sounders FC joining Major League Soccer.

Having been unable to secure a professional contract, O'Brien signed with Tacoma Tide of the USL Premier Development League for the 2009 season.

On August 7, 2009, O'Brien signed a contract for the remainder of the season with the Montreal Impact, joining his brother Ciaran O'Brien who was on loan with the same team. On September 29, O'Brien was released by Impact.

As of January 2019, O'Brien is the technical director for Pacific Northwest Soccer Club in the Seattle, Washington area.

== Personal life ==
O'Brien is the son of former Republic of Ireland international player Fran O'Brien, and the brother of fellow professional soccer player Ciaran O'Brien. His uncle Derek O'Brien (footballer) former Irish professional football player, his sons Mark O'Brien, Neil O'Brien, Colin O'Brien are all Irish football players.

== Honors ==
Seattle Sounders

- USL First Division Championship: 2005, 2007
- USL First Division Commissioner's Cup: 2007
- Pacific Division: 2002
- Cascadia Cup: 2006, 2007

Individual

- A-League MVP: 2002
- A-League Assist Leader: 2002
