= Zafer Kılıçkan =

Turkish footballer

Zafer Kilickan
Personal information
- Full name: Zafer Kılıçkan
- Date of birth: February 22, 1973 (age 53)
- Place of birth: Gölcük, Turkey
- Height: 5 ft 9 in (1.75 m)
- Position: Midfielder

Team information
- Current team: Minnesota Thunder
- Number: 24

Senior career*
Years	Team	Apps	(Gls)
1991–1998	Pendikspor		
1998–1999	Kuşadasıspor		
1999–2001	Pendikspor		
2000–2001	→ Anadolu Üsküdar 1908 (loan)		
2001–2002	Boluspor		
2002–2006	Minnesota Thunder		

Managerial career
- 2004–: Augsburg University
- * Club domestic league appearances and goals as of December 22, 2006

Zafer Kılıçkan (born February 22, 1973, in Gölcük) is a former Turkish football midfielder who last played for USL First Division side Minnesota Thunder.

== Club career ==
Kılıçkan played for several clubs in the lower divisions of Turkish football, including Pendikspor and Boluspor. In 2002, Kılıçkan signed with the Minnesota Thunder of the USL First Division, playing with the team through the 2006 season.

== Career as manager ==
He is currently the Assistant Coach of Women's Soccer team at Augsburg University. He is also the Director of Camps for the Minneapolis United Soccer. Zafer also teaching PowerYoga - Vinyasa during the winter season at UnitedClubs, Lotus and Yoga Rooms in Istanbul.
