= Josh Henderson (soccer) =

American soccer player

Personal information
- Date of birth: October 14, 1977 (age 49)
- Place of birth: Baton Rouge, Louisiana, U.S.
- Height: 6 ft 0 in (1.83 m)
- Position: Forward

Youth career
- 1995–1997: Duke Blue Devils

Senior career*
Years	Team	Apps	(Gls)
1998	New Orleans Storm	3	(1)
1999	Lehigh Valley Steam	25	(8)
2000	Atlanta Silverbacks	27	(8)
2001–2002	Richmond Kickers	60	(27)
2003	Charleston Battery	25	(13)
- * Club domestic league appearances and goals

Josh Henderson (born October 14, 1977) is an American retired soccer forward who played professionally in the USL A-League.

== Youth ==
After spending his early childhood in Potosi, Missouri, Henderson grew up playing soccer in Baton Rouge, where his talent was quickly noticed by many professional scouts. He attended his first three years of high school at Bishop Joseph V. Sullivan High School, now called St. Michael the Archangel High School, in southeast Baton Rouge. There he led the Warriors to a Division II state title and a 24-2-3 record in the 1993–1994 season. The 1–0 win over state soccer power Vandebilt Catholic High School secured the school's only soccer title to date. Building on that season's success, St. Michael now has one of the premiere soccer programs in the state of Louisiana, which produces many professional soccer players. The team will celebrate the 20th-year anniversary of the state title next season.

After leading his team to the state title, Henderson began looking for ways to secure a professional career. While his parents remained in Baton Rouge, Josh moved to Los Angeles to attend La Canada High School, which has one of the country's best soccer programs. Henderson graduated in 1995. He then attended Duke University, playing three seasons (1995–1997) with the Duke's soccer team. In 1995, Duke went to the NCAA Men's Division I Soccer Championship where it fell to the Wisconsin Badgers.

== Professional ==
In 1998, Henderson moved to Scotland where he had unsuccessful trials with several teams. After spending some time with the Hearts reserve team, he returned to United States. He joined the Chicago Fire, but after the Fire released him, he finished the season with the New Orleans Storm of the USISL A-League. The Storm folded at the end of the season and Henderson moved to the Lehigh Valley Steam for the 1999 A-League season. In February 2000 the Los Angeles Galaxy drafted Henderson in the fourth round (47th overall) of the 2000 MLS SuperDraft. The Galaxy released Henderson during the pre-season and Henderson signed with the Atlanta Silverbacks for the 2000 A-League season. On January 22, 2001, the Richmond Kickers signed Henderson. On January 21, 2003, Henderson moved to the Charleston Battery.
