= Kirk Wilson =

American soccer player

Personal information
- Date of birth: October 7, 1977 (age 49)
- Place of birth: Torrance, California, United States
- Height: 5 ft 10 in (1.78 m)
- Positions: Forward; midfielder

Youth career
- 1996–1997: Drake Bulldogs

Senior career*
Years	Team	Apps	(Gls)
1997	Des Moines Menace		
1998	El Paso Patriots	27	(15)
1999–2000	Dallas Burn	6	(0)
1999	→ Austin Lone Stars (loan)	1	(2)
1999	→ MLS Pro 40 (loan)	11	(1)
1999	→ El Paso Patriots (loan)	3	(2)
2000	El Paso Patriots	21	(2)
2001–2005	Rochester Rhinos	116	(22)
2006	Montreal Impact	16	(0)

International career
1998–1999	United States U23		
- * Club domestic league appearances and goals

Kirk Wilson is a retired American soccer player who played professionally in Major League Soccer and the USL A-League.

== Youth ==
Wilson's family moved from California to El Paso, Texas when he was a child. He graduated from Coronado High School where he was part of the 1996 Texas State High School soccer championship team. During the summer of 1997, Wilson played for the Des Moines Menace of the USISL Premier Development Soccer League. Wilson attended Drake University, playing on the men's soccer team 1996 and 1997.

== Professional ==
In 1998, Wilson left Drake soon after and moved to Germany where he spent time training with various teams. In the spring of 1998, he returned to the United States and signed with the El Paso Patriots of the USISL A-League for the 1998 A-League season. He was fourth in the league's points chart, finished runner-up in the Rookie of the Year, and was Second Team All League. In February 1999, the Dallas Burn selected Wilson in the first round (seventh overall) of the 1999 MLS Supplemental Draft. He played five games for the Burn that season, going on loan to the Patriots in June and the MLS Project 40 team, which also competed in the USISL A-League, from June through the playoffs. In 2000, Wilson began the MLS season with the Burn, playing one game. On April 2, 2000, the Burn waived Wilson. He quickly signed with the El Paso Patriots where he played the rest of the season. In 2001, Wilson moved to the Rochester Rhinos where he was part of the Rhinos 2001 championship squad. He spent five seasons in Rochester. In 2005, his last season with the Rhinos, Wilson was first team All League. In December 2005, Wilson signed as a free agent with the Montreal Impact. Wilson retired at the end of the season and moved his family back to Des Moines, Iowa where he founded a company focused on training soccer players.

== International ==
In 1998 and 1999, Wilson played for the United States men's national under-23 soccer team.
