= Gabriel Gervais =

Canadian soccer player (born 1976)

Personal information
- Date of birth: September 18, 1976 (age 50)
- Place of birth: Montreal, Quebec, Canada
- Height: 6 ft 2 in (1.88 m)
- Position: Defender

College career
Years	Team	Apps	(Gls)
- McGill Redmen
- Syracuse Orange

Senior career*
Years	Team	Apps	(Gls)
2000–2001	Rochester Rhinos	15	(2)
2000–2001	Toronto ThunderHawks (indoor)	37	(10)
2002–2008	Montreal Impact	150	(7)

International career
2004–2007	Canada	11	(0)
- * Club domestic league appearances and goals

Gabriel Gervais (born September 18, 1976) is a Canadian retired soccer player who played as a defender for the Montreal Impact and Canada. He was named president of CF Montreal on March 28, 2022.

== Club career ==
Gervais was born in Montreal, Quebec, Canada. During this tenure with the Montreal Impact Gervais helped the club win the league championship in 2004, as well as the regular season championships in 2005 and 2006. He was proclaimed Defensive Player of the Year for the Impact three times in 2002, 2003 and 2006, and won the Giuseppe-Saputo Trophy in 2004, awarded to the most valuable player of the Impact. Gervais was also named Defender of the Year in the USL First Division in 2003, 2004 and 2006, becoming the first player in the league to win that award three times. Gervais was also picked on the USL First Division All-League Team for six straight years, from 2002 to 2007.

On January 6, 2009, Gervais announced his retirement from soccer, after a nine-year career in the United Soccer Leagues First Division. On April 15, 2009, during the Montreal Impact's pre-season banquet the club honoured Gervais by recognizing him as a Team Builder and was made an ambassador to the club. Gervais had a stint in the National Professional Soccer League with the short lived expansion franchise the Toronto ThunderHawks during the 2000–2001 winter indoor season. He helped the ThunderHawks reach the postseason by finishing second in the National Conference, and reached the Conference finals where they were defeated by the Milwaukee Wave.

== International career ==
Gervais made his national team debut on January 18, 2004, in a 1–0 win against Barbados. He was invited to the Canadian World Cup team's training camp held between January 12 and 23, 2004, in Fort Lauderdale, following the hiring of Frank Yallop as new head coach. He played against Guatemala September 8, 2004, in a World Cup qualifying game. He played an international friendly against Northern Ireland on February 9, 2005, in Belfast where he received two yellow cards and was sent off. He was invited to the Canadian national team's training camp in Fort Lauderdale from June 4 to 9, 2005, and to the Gold Cup, from July 6 through 24. Though he missed the opening game for Canada at the Gold Cup against Costa Rica due to injury, he started and played 90 minutes against the United States on July 9, as well as playing against Cuba on July 12.

== Career statistics ==
Appearances and goals by club, season and competition
Team	Season	League			Playoffs		Cup (Note: Includes Lamar Hunt U.S. Open Cup (American Based Clubs), Nutrilite Canadian Cup (Canadian Based Clubs))		Total	
Team	Season	Division	Apps	Goals	Apps	Goals	Apps	Goals	Apps	Goals
Rochester Rhinos	2000	A-League	1	0	–		–		1	0
Rochester Rhinos	2001	A-League	14	2	1	0	–		15	2
Rochester Rhinos	Total		15	2	1	0	0	0	16	2
Montreal Impact	2002	A-League	28	2	4	0	–		32	2
Montreal Impact	2003	A-League	26	1	2	0	–		28	1
Montreal Impact	2004	A-League	26	0	5	0	–		31	0
Montreal Impact	2005	USL-1	21	2	2	0	–		23	2
Montreal Impact	2006	USL-1	23	1	2	0	–		25	1
Montreal Impact	2007	USL-1	17	1	2	0	–		19	1
Montreal Impact	2008	USL-1	9	0	–		1	0	10	0
Montreal Impact	Total		150	7	17	0	1	0	168	7
Career total			165	9	18	0	1	0	184	9

== Honours ==
Montreal Impact

- USL First Division Championship: 2004
- USL First Division Commissioners Cup: 2005, 2006
- Voyageurs Cup: 2004, 2005, 2006, 2007, 2008

Rochester Raging Rhinos

- USL First Division Championship: 2000, 2001
