= Chris Franks (soccer) =

Canadian soccer player and physiotherapist

Personal information
- Date of birth: 27 April 1974 (age 52)
- Place of birth: Montreal, Quebec, Canada
- Height: 5 ft 11 in (1.80 m)
- Position: Defender

Youth career
- 1988–1993: UBC Thunderbirds

Senior career*
Years	Team	Apps	(Gls)
1994–2000	Vancouver 86ers	87	(11)
2001–2005	Vancouver Whitecaps FC	85	(0)
2005–2006	Doncaster Rovers	0	(0)

International career
1991–1992	Canada U20	3	(1)
1994–1996	Canada U23	11	(2)
1998	Canada	1	(0)
- * Club domestic league appearances and goals

Chris Franks (born 27 April 1974) is a Canadian former international soccer player who played professionally in North America and England.

He currently is physiotherapist at Vancouver Whitecaps FC.

== Club career ==
Franks has played professionally for the Vancouver Whitecaps FC and Doncaster Rovers. However, he never made a league appearance for Doncaster.

== International career ==
He made his debut for Canada in a May 1998 friendly match against Macedonia and that game proved to be his only international appearance.

== Personal life ==
He is the older brother of Mike Franks.
