= Scott Jenkins (soccer) =

American soccer player

Personal information
- Date of birth: December 11, 1973 (age 52)
- Place of birth: Redmond, Washington, U.S.
- Height: 6 ft 2 in (1.88 m)
- Position: Defender

College career
Years	Team	Apps	(Gls)
1992–1995	Washington Huskies		

Senior career*
Years	Team	Apps	(Gls)
1996	Everett BigFoot		
1997–2005	Seattle Sounders	224	(12)
- * Club domestic league appearances and goals

Scott Jenkins is an American retired soccer defender who spent his entire professional career with the Seattle Sounders in the USL A-League.

Jenkins graduated from Redmond High School. He attended the University of Washington, playing on the men's soccer team from 1992 to 1995. In 1996, he played for the Everett BigFoot. In 1997, he turned professional with the Seattle Sounders of the USL A-League. Jenkins spent his entire career with Seattle, winning the league title in 2005, his last season with the team.
