= Tony Williams (soccer) =

American soccer player

Personal information
- Date of birth: July 13, 1976 (age 50)
- Place of birth: St. Louis, Missouri, United States
- Height: 5 ft 7 in (1.70 m)
- Positions: Defender; midfielder

Youth career
- 1994–1997: Clemson Tigers

Senior career*
Years	Team	Apps	(Gls)
1998–2007	Richmond Kickers	219	(13)
- * Club domestic league appearances and goals

Tony Williams is a retired American soccer player who spent his entire career with the Richmond Kickers.

In 1994, Williams graduated from St. John Vianney High School. He attended Clemson University, playing on the men's soccer team from 1994 to 1997. In February 1998, the Hampton Roads Mariners selected Williams in the second round (twentieth overall) of the A-League draft. They traded his rights to the Richmond Kickers where he played from 1998 to 2007. In 2006, the Kickers won the USL Second Division championship.
