= Lehigh Valley Steam =

Former soccer club in Pennsylvania

Lehigh Valley Steam was a soccer club that competed in the A-League in 1999. Based in Lehigh Valley, Pennsylvania, the club has problems securing a home stadium and folded after a single season. The club featured future U.S. national team player Kerry Zavagnin and was coached by Daryl Shore.

The team name was decided through a "Name the Soccer Team Contest", with eight different contestants submitting "Lehigh Valley Steam" or slight variants for the name.

== Year-by-year ==
| Year | Division | League | Reg. season | Playoffs | Open Cup |
|---|---|---|---|---|---|
| 1999 | 2 | USL A-League | 5th, Northeast | Round of 16 | Did not qualify |
