= James R. Hallford Stadium =

Football stadium in Clarkston, US

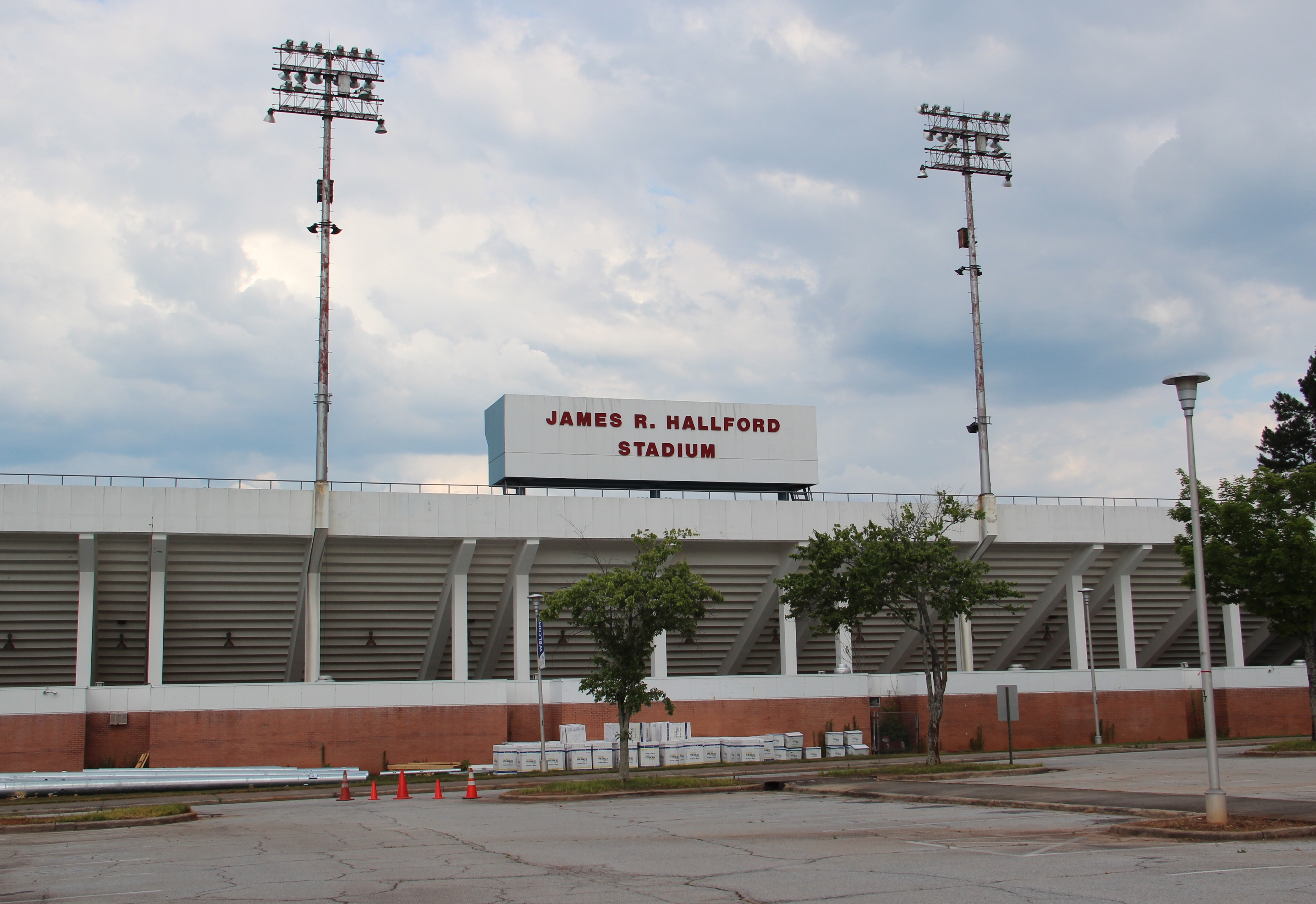
- Interactive map of James R. Hallford Stadium
- Former names: DeKalb Memorial Stadium (1968–1999)
- Location: 3789 Memorial College Ave. Clarkston, Georgia
- Coordinates: 33.79575°N 84.233691°W
- Owner: DeKalb County Public Schools
- Capacity: 15,000

Construction
- Opened: 1968

Tenants
- Georgia Generals (ASL) (1982); Atlanta Silverbacks (USL-1) (2003–2005); Martin Luther King Jr. High School (GHSA); Stephenson High School (GHSA)

James R. Hallford Stadium is a football stadium in Clarkston, Georgia. Until 1999 it was called DeKalb Memorial Stadium.

The stadium holds 15,000 spectators and is currently used by two DeKalb County high schools. The stadium is also used by all DeKalb County high school football teams for all home state football playoff games as this is the largest stadium and the only stadium with bleachers on both sides of the field in the DeKalb County School District. The GHSA held football championship games here in 1970, 1972, 1973, 1993, and 1995.

On August 2, 1981, the Atlanta Chiefs of the North American Soccer League played a regular season home game against the Fort Lauderdale Strikers, drawing 14,437 fans. It was the largest home crowd for the 1979–81 iteration of the Chiefs franchise. There was even talk that they might move there for the following season, but they folded 26 days later after being eliminated from the playoffs.

The following year it was the home stadium of Georgia Generals of the American Soccer League, and two decades later the Atlanta Silverbacks of the A-League called it home until they moved to the RE/MAX Greater Atlanta Stadium in 2004.

== GHSA football championship games ==
- December 12, 1970 (Class AAA): Lakeside (DeKalb) 7, Richmond Academy 6
- December 10, 1971 (Class AA): Westminster 13, North Fulton 0
- December 8, 1973 (Class AAA): Thomasville 40, Wheeler 35
- December 18, 1993 (Class AAAA): Dunwoody 21, South Gwinnett 7
- December 16, 1995 (Class AAAA): Southwest DeKalb 14, Parkview 7
