= Steve Shak =

American soccer player and coach

Personal information
- Full name: Steve Shak
- Date of birth: February 8, 1978 (age 48)
- Place of birth: Cerritos, California, United States
- Height: 6 ft 1 in (1.85 m)
- Position: Midfielder

Youth career
- 1996–1999: UCLA Bruins

Senior career*
Years	Team	Apps	(Gls)
2000–2001	MetroStars	32	(1)
2001–2002	Colorado Rapids	6	(0)
2002	→ Hampton Roads Mariners (loan)	2	(0)
2002–2003	Minnesota Thunder	35	(1)
2004	Bodens BK		
2004–2006	Virginia Beach Mariners	63	(6)
2007–2009	Charlotte Eagles	51	(5)
Total		152	(12)

Managerial career
- 2007–: Charlotte Eagles (assistant)
- * Club domestic league appearances and goals

Steve Shak (born February 8, 1978, in Cerritos, California) is a retired American soccer player. He currently works for Northwestern Mutual. Previously Shak was an assistant coach with the Charlotte Eagles of the USL Second Division. He also joined the North Carolina State coaching staff as a volunteer assistant coach in 2013.

A former UCLA college standout and Major League Soccer number one draft pick, Shak spent four years in the American top league with the MetroStars and with Colorado Rapids, but with the exception of a brief stint in Sweden, spent the majority of his career in the USL, including extended periods with the Virginia Beach Mariners and the Eagles.

== Career ==
=== College ===
Shak played college soccer at UCLA, where he started out as a walk-on and became a starter, helping the Bruins to the College Cup in 1997. He also played for the United States at under-23 level.

=== Professional ===
With the MetroStars coming off the worst season in MLS history in 1999, they were given the first pick in the 2000 MLS SuperDraft. Despite Shak being projected to go in the third or fourth round, and such highly rated prospects as Nick Garcia, Carlos Bocanegra, and Danny Califf on the board, the Metrostars drafted Shak as the first overall pick.

Shak spent nearly 2 seasons with the MetroStars, playing on defense as well as midfield, scoring a goal and an assist. He was traded to the Colorado Rapids for Ross Paule at the end of the 2001 season. After playing one minute for the Rapids in 2002 and going on loan to the Hampton Roads Mariners for two games, Shak was released by the Rapids prior to the 2003 season. Shak then signed with the Minnesota Thunder of the USL A-League. In 2004, Shak played for Bodens BK in the Swedish Supperettan (2nd Division). Later in 2004 he returned to the United States and signed with the Virginia Beach Mariners where he captained the team for the 2005 and 2006 seasons. When the Mariners folded in early 2007, Shak switched to the Charlotte Eagles. He made his debut for them on April 20, 2007, scoring one goal in a 4–1 victory over Crystal Palace Baltimore, and subsequently played 51 times for the team before retiring after the end of the 2009 season.

=== International ===
In 1999 Shak was a member of the US Olympic Team that won a bronze medal in the Pan-American Games in Winnipeg, Canada. He started 5 of 6 games for the USA but was later cut from the Olympic Team roster before the 2000 Sydney Olympics. In 2005, Shak was a replacement player during the U.S. national team labor dispute.
