= Destin Makumbu =

English footballer

Personal information
- Date of birth: 28 April 1982 (age 44)
- Place of birth: London, England
- Height: 6 ft 0 in (1.83 m)
- Position: Defender

Youth career
- Tottenham Hotspur

Senior career*
Years	Team	Apps	(Gls)
2001–2002	Milwaukee Rampage	42	(2)
2003–2007	Bodens BK		
2008	Kongsvinger	1	(0)
2008–2013	Mo IL	49	(0)
2010	→ Tønsberg (loan)	1	(0)
2014	Åga	3	(1)
2015–2017	Stålkameratene	47	(0)
- * Club domestic league appearances and goals

Destin Makumbu (born 4 August 1982) is an English former professional footballer who played as a defender in the United States, Sweden and Norway.

Makumbu played in the Tottenham Hotspur youth system. In 2001, he moved to the United States where he joined the Milwaukee Rampage of the USL A-League. In 2003, he moved to Sweden and signed with Bodens BK. He played five seasons with Boden before moving to Norwegian club Kongsvinger for one season. In August 2008, Makumbu moved to Mo IL.

== Personal life ==
Makumbu is of Congolese descent.
