= Kyle Smith (soccer, born 1973) =

American soccer player

Personal information
- Date of birth: August 9, 1978 (age 48)
- Place of birth: San Diego, California, United States
- Height: 6 ft 0 in (1.83 m)
- Positions: Midfielder; defender

Youth career
- 1996: San Diego State Aztecs
- 1997–2000: Santa Clara Broncos

Senior career*
Years	Team	Apps	(Gls)
2001–2004	Seattle Sounders	80	(15)

Managerial career
- 2011: San Diego State Aztecs (assistant)
- * Club domestic league appearances and goals

Kyle Smith is a retired American soccer player who played professionally with the Seattle Sounders in the USL A-League. He is the Director of Soccer Operations at San Diego State University

In 1996, Smith began his collegiate career at San Diego State University. He started nine of the fifteen games he played that season, scoring one goal. Smith then transferred to Santa Clara University where he was a three-year starter. In 1999, Santa Clara was runner-up to the Indiana Hoosiers in the NCAA Division I Men's Soccer Championship. In 2001, Smith had an invitation-only trial with the Seattle Sounders of the USL A-League. Smith played for the Sounders until 2004, leading the team in scoring in 2003. Both during his time with the Sounders and after his retirement, Smith coached youth soccer in the Seattle area. In 2011, Smith became an assistant coach with the San Diego State Aztecs men’ soccer team. In 2012, he moved up to become the Director of Soccer Operations at San Diego State.
