= Seattle Sounders (1994–2008) =

Former American soccer team

- Sounders logo used from 1994 to 2002
- Full name: Seattle Sounders
- Nickname: Sounders
- Founded: 1994
- Dissolved: 2008 (transferred to MLS)
- Stadium: Starfire Sports Complex
- Capacity: 4,500
- Chairman: Adrian Hanauer
- Manager: Brian Schmetzer (2002–2008)
- League: American Professional Soccer League (1994); A-League (1995–2004); USL First Division (2005–2008)
- 2008: League: 6th Playoffs: Did not qualify
Home colors	Away colors

The Seattle Sounders were an American professional soccer team that was founded in 1994 and played in several second-division leagues, beginning with the American Professional Soccer League. They played in the A-League, later renamed the USL First Division, from 1997 to 2008. The team was named for the Seattle Sounders of the North American Soccer League (NASL), which folded in 1983. The Sounders folded after the 2008 season as part of a transition to a new Major League Soccer (MLS) team named Seattle Sounders FC that debuted in 2009.

The team generally used blue and white jerseys. They played at Memorial Stadium and various small venues from 1994 until their move to Qwest Field (now Lumen Field) in 2003. The Sounders played their last season at the Starfire Sports Complex in Tukwila, Washington, which would become the training facility for the MLS team. Their head coach from 2002 to 2008 was Brian Schmetzer, who had played for the NASL Sounders and later coached the MLS team. A sister organization, the Seattle Sounders Women, played in the women's USL W-League from 2001 to 2015.

== History ==
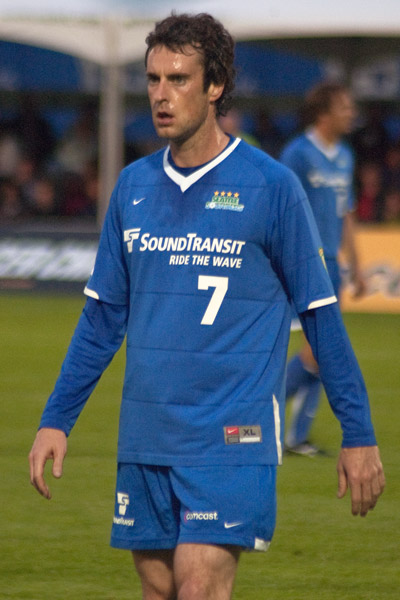
Leighton O'Brien in the Seattle Sounders away uniform during the 2008 season

The club was founded in 1994 and named after the original Seattle Sounders team, which played from 1974 to 1983 in the North American Soccer League. Former coach Alan Hinton had acquired rights to the Sounders name after the club folded and began a campaign to bring an American Professional Soccer League (APSL; later the A-League) team to the city in 1992. The league previously had another Seattle team, the Seattle Storm, that had joined from the Western Soccer Alliance and played for one APSL season in 1990 before they folded.

A bid for a new APSL team, to be named the Sounders and owned by former Microsoft executives Scott Oki and Neil Farnsworth, was announced in September 1993. The bid's approval was announced by United States Soccer Federation secretary general Hank Steinbrecher on January 30, 1994, during a men's international friendly match between the United States and Russia at the Kingdome that was attended by 43,651 spectators. The reborn Sounders competed with a rival group that aimed to create a Seattle franchise for Major League Soccer, the new top-level soccer league for the United States. Hinton was named club president and later appointed himself as head coach prior to the inaugural season.

The Sounders played their inaugural season at the Tacoma Dome and Memorial Stadium. The team decided against playing at the Kingdome and Husky Stadium due to their high rents, and found Cheney Stadium in Tacoma to be unsuitable for soccer use. The Sounders finished the 1994 season with a 14–6 record, the best in the A-League, but lost in the first round of the playoffs to the Colorado Foxes. Hinton resigned as head coach and club president in 1996 and transferred the rights to the Sounders name to Oki. The Sounders played in the 1996 CONCACAF Champions' Cup and advanced to the final round in Guatemala City, where they finished at the bottom of a four-team group. They were the second Seattle-based team to play in the continental championship, after the Seattle Mitre Eagles in the 1988 edition, who also lost to Cruz Azul.

For the 1999 season, the team played at Renton Memorial Stadium, a 6,500-seat suburban venue in Renton, while Memorial Stadium in Seattle underwent renovations. The Sounders had an average attendance of 6,132 in 1994, but declined to 2,100 by 1999; the club had also lost its profitability during this time. They attracted more spectators in Renton, but found group sales had declined and needed more locker room space for their various teams; in 2000, the Sounders returned to Memorial Stadium.

The Sounders earned four A-League championships, winning the playoffs in 1995, 1996, 2005, and 2007. Seattle finished with the best regular season record in the league in 1994, 2002, and 2007. In addition to their titles, the Sounders finished as runners-up in the league championship to the Montreal Impact in 2004. Seattle drew the Richmond Kickers 1–1 at Qwest Field before claiming the 2005 championship 4–3 in a penalty shootout. In 2007, the Sounders defeated the Atlanta Silverbacks 4–0 to claim their fourth championship title, an A-League/USL-1 record.

The team primarily played at Memorial Stadium, which was aging and in need of repairs, and later Seahawks Stadium (Qwest Field) beginning in 2003 despite their low average attendance. Seahawks Stadium had been designed to be used by a future MLS team, but an expansion team had not been granted after it opened. In the early 2000s, the team considered plans to build a soccer-specific stadium with approximately 15,000 to 20,000 seats and a complex of fields in various suburbs, including Fife and Kent. In 2006, the Sounders proposed a stadium at the Kitsap County Faigrounds in Bremerton, one of Seattle's western suburbs in Kitsap County. A 6,500-seat stadium was proposed again in 2007 as the home of a possible Major League Soccer franchise. A move to Tacoma or folding the club were also considered in the event that a rival MLS bid won rights to an expansion team in Seattle, according to Hanauer.

=== MLS expansion and final season ===
The Sounders looked to earn an MLS expansion team in the 1990s and 2000s while also competing with other prospective ownership groups. Farnsworth and Oki initially stated that they were interested in becoming minority investors in an MLS team and permit use of the Sounders name, rather than being majority owners. In 2000, the club announced plans to pursue a MLS team that would play in the then-unbuilt Seahawks Stadium (now Lumen Field) and keep the A-League franchise as a developmental team named "Sounders Premier". Later owner Adrian Hanauer also made a bid for a 2005 expansion slot that was instead awarded to Real Salt Lake. On November 13, 2007, Major League Soccer (MLS) announced that it had selected Seattle as the recipient of an expansion team that would begin play at Qwest Field in 2009. USL Sounders owner Adrian Hanauer would become one of the team's owners, along with Drew Carey, Paul Allen and majority owner Joe Roth.

The team's name, Seattle Sounders FC, was unveiled on April 7, 2008, continuing the Sounders name into MLS. The USL team would play their last season in 2008, mostly at the Starfire Sports Complex in Tukwila. The Sounders made their second consecutive appearance in the U.S. Open Cup semifinals, where they lost to fellow USL-1 club Charleston Battery in a penalty shootout. Following a regular season that finished with a 10–10–10 record, the second-division team were eliminated from the playoffs in the first round by the Montreal Impact and played their last competitive match on September 28, 2008. The Sounders played a series of exhibition matches in Argentina against the reserve squads of local clubs as part of a farewell tour in late October 2008. They won all six matches, which also served as a tryout for the MLS team for the existing members of the USL team. A proposal to relocate the Sounders franchise in USL to Bremerton, Washington, was rejected by the league and instead granted as a Premier Development League team that was named the Kitsap Pumas.

== Club identity ==
The Sounders adopted a new logo in 1994 that featured an orca jumping from the wordmark to head a soccer ball. It was replaced by the original logo from the NASL team at the beginning of the 2003 season.

== Year-by-year ==
This is a complete list of seasons for the A-League/USL club. For a season-by-season history including the current Seattle Sounders FC MLS franchise, see History of professional soccer in Seattle#Sounders season results.

Results of the Seattle Sounders by second-division season
Season	League														Position		Playoffs	USOC	Other		Top goalscorer(s) (Note: Top goalscorer(s) includes all goals scored in regular season matches.)	
Season	League	Div.	Conference	Pld.	W	L	D	SW	SL	GF	GA	GD	Pts	Pct	Conf.	Overall	Playoffs	USOC	Competition	Result	Player(s)	Goals
1994	APSL	2 (Note: The American Professional Soccer League was sanctioned as a Division II league but was the de facto top flight league in the United States until Major League Soccer began play in 1996.)	—	20	14	5	—	0	1	38	16	+22	121	.725	—	1st	SF	DNE	—	—	Chance Fry	11
1995	A-League	2	—	24	13	4	—	5	2	40	24	+16	51	.688	—	2nd	W	SF	—	—	Peter Hattrup ♦	11
1996	A-League	2	—	27	12	11	—	4	0	35	25	+10	40	.519	—	3rd	W	QF	CONCACAF Champions' Cup	4th	Jason Farrell	6
1997	A-League	2	Pacific (Note: The USISL A-League used divisions as their equivalent to conferences from 1997 to 1999 before reorganizing them under conferences beginning in the 2000 season.)	28	16	7	—	2	3	42	19	+23	50	.661	2nd	5th	QF	R2	—	—	Mike Gailey	10
1998	A-League	2	Pacific	28	17	10	—	1	0	63	28	+35	52	.625	2nd	6th	QF	DNQ	—	—	Mark Baena ♦	24
1999	A-League	2	Pacific	28	16	8	—	3	1	56	36	+20	81 (Note: From 1999 to 2002, the A-League awarded a bonus point to teams that scored three or more goals in a match. The Sounders earned 10 bonus points in 1999, 10 bonus points in 2000, 4 bonus points in 2001, and 14 bonus points in 2002.)	.643	3rd	6th	QF	R3	—	—	Mark Baena ♦	20
2000	A-League	2	Western	28	18	7	3	—	—	56	38	+18	85	.696	3rd	4th	QF	R2	—	—	Greg Howes ♦	17
2001	A-League	2	Western	26	13	12	1	—	—	40	39	+1	57	.519	5th	12th	DNQ	R2	—	—	Leighton O'Brien	11
2002	A-League	2	Western	28	23	4	1	—	—	71	27	+44	107	.839	1st	1st	QF	R3	—	—	Brian Ching	16
2003	A-League	2	Western	28	16	7	5	—	—	45	24	+21	53	.661	2nd	3rd	SF	QF	—	—	Kyle Smith	6
2004	A-League	2	Western	28	13	11	4	—	—	40	34	+6	43	.536	4th	9th	RU	DNQ	—	—	Welton Melo	5
2005	USL-1	2	—	28	11	6	11	—	—	33	25	+8	44	.589	—	4th	W	R3	—	—	Roger Levesque	6
2006	USL-1	2	—	28	11	13	4	—	—	42	48	−6	37	.464	—	7th	DNQ	R3	—	—	Cam Weaver ♦	18
2007	USL-1	2	—	28	16	6	6	—	—	37	23	+14	54	.679	—	1st	W	SF	—	—	Sébastien Le Toux ♦	10
2008	USL-1	2	—	30	10	10	10	—	—	37	36	+1	40	.500	—	6th	QF	SF	—	—	Sébastien Le Toux	14

== Honors ==
=== Team honors ===
- League Championship
  - Winner (4): 1995, 1996, 2005, 2007
  - Runners-up (1): 2004
- Commissioner's Cup (regular season championship)
  - Winner (3): 1994, 2002, 2007
- Pacific Division Champion
  - Winner (3): 2000, 2002, 2003
  - Runners-up (2): 1997, 1998
- Western Conference Champion
  - Winner (1): 2004
- Cascadia Cup
  - Winner (2): 2006, 2007

=== Individual player honors ===
MVP

- 1995 – Peter Hattrup
- 1998 – Mark Baena
- 2002 – Leighton O'Brien
- 2007 – Sebastian Le Toux

Leading scorer

- 1995 – Peter Hattrup
- 1998 – Mark Baena
- 1999 – Niall Thompson
- 2006 – Cam Weaver
- 2007 – Sebastian Le Toux (tied)

Goalkeeper of the Year

- 1994 – Marcus Hahnemann
- 1995 – Marcus Hahnemann
- 1997 – Dusty Hudock

Defender of the Year

- 2005 – Taylor Graham

Coach of the Year

- 1994 – Alan Hinton
- 2000 – Neil Megson
- 2002 – Brian Schmetzer

Rookie of the Year

- 1994 – Jason Dunn
- 2000 – Greg Howes
- 2006 – Cam Weaver

First team All Star

- 1994 – Marcus Hahnemann, Neil Megson, Shawn Medved, Chance Fry
- 1995 – Marcus Hahnemann, Peter Hattrup
- 1996 – Wade Webber
- 1997 – Dusty Hudock, Mark Watson
- 1998 – Mark Baena
- 1999 – Mark Baena
- 2000 – Darren Sawatzky
- 2001 – Leighton O'Brien
- 2002 – Andrew Gregor, Leighton O'Brien, Brian Ching
- 2003 – Danny Jackson, Andrew Gregor
- 2005 – Taylor Graham
- 2008 – Taylor Graham

== Stadiums ==
Average attendance
Year	Attendance
1994	6,348
1995	4,571
1996	3,750
1997	2,873
1998	2,902
1999	2,243
2000	2,143
2001	1,885
2002	4,087
2003	3,357
2004	2,874
2005	2,885
2006	3,826
2007	3,325
2008	3,386

- Tacoma Dome, Tacoma (1994)
- Memorial Stadium, Seattle (1994–1998, 2000–2003)
- Renton Memorial Stadium, Renton, Washington (1999), due to construction at Seattle Center
- Interbay Stadium, occasional matches (2002)
- Huskies Soccer Field, U.S. Open Cup match (2003)
- Qwest Field (formerly Seahawks Stadium and CenturyLink Field; now Lumen Field), Seattle, Washington (2003–2007)
- Starfire Sports Complex, Tukwila, Washington (2005–2007 occasional games, 2008)

The Sounders originally played at Memorial Stadium, with select matches at other venues such as the Tacoma Dome, and moved to Qwest Field (originally Seahawks Stadium) in 2003. The Sounders and the Sounders Select Women played the first-ever sporting event at the stadium on July 28, 2002, before 25,515 fans—setting an A-League attendance record. For Sounders matches, Qwest Field was limited to a capacity of 8,500 seats on the east side of the lower bowl. After opening the 2008 season at Qwest Field, the Sounders played their remaining 14 league home fixtures at Starfire Sports Complex.

Various exhibition matches against A-League and MLS opponents were played at local high schools, including Marysville Pilchuck in 1998 and Mount Vernon in 1999.

== Ownership and management ==
In 2007, the team had eight owners: general manager Adrian Hanauer; former Microsoft executives Scott Oki, Neil Farnsworth, and Josef Bascovitz; tour operator Paul Barry; real estate developer Robin Waite; tech executive Rick Cantu; and investor Tor Taylor. The Sounders had been unprofitable for most of their existence in the second division of American soccer.

=== Head coaches ===
Note: A-League/USL First Division did not have draws until 2000.

Name	Nation	Tenure	Record		
Name	Nation	Tenure	W	L	D
Alan Hinton	England	April 6, 1994 – January 22, 1996	37	15	–
Neil Megson	United States	March 1, 1996 – April 19, 2001	89	47	3
Bernie James	United States	April 19, 2001 – November 9, 2001 (interim)	13	12	1
Brian Schmetzer	United States	November 28, 2001 – 2008	122	69	46

== Affiliated teams ==
During their first years in the USISL/USL, the Sounders were affiliated with the Colorado Rapids of Major League Soccer. Their assigned affiliation was changed to the San Jose Earthquakes in 2001. The Sounders formed a partnership with the German side Werder Bremen in 1998 due to Sounders USL-PDL player Andrew Dallman's involvement with the German side via US indoor soccer legends Fernando Clavijo, Raffaele Ruotolo, and Jean Willrich. The also formed a partnership with English side Cambridge United in 2006 due to the shared involvement of Adrian Hanauer, who bought the Sounders in 2002.

The Sounders founded a developmental USL Premier Development League (PDL) team, named Seattle Sounders Select, in 1999. They replaced the Seattle BigFoot, an independent team who had been considered an unofficial development squad. In the second round of the 2001 U.S. Open Cup, they eliminated MLS side Dallas Burn and advanced further than their parent club, losing to the Los Angeles Galaxy in the third round. The team had financial troubles and folded after the 2002 season after failing to pay for its $85,000 budget. The Sounders later formed a relationship with a new PDL franchise, the Tacoma Tides, which was established in 2006.

A women's team, named Seattle Sounders Select Women, began play in 2000 and moved to the USL W-League the following year. The team was rebranded as Seattle Sounders Women in 2003 and was sold in 2008 to Tacoma Tides owner Mike Jennings as part of preparations for the USL–MLS transition. The Sounders Women was temporarily home to several national team players in 2012 following the collapse of Women's Professional Soccer. The Sounders Women left the W-League when it folded in 2015 and moved to the Women's Premier Soccer League, where they won their first national championship in 2018. The team terminated their branding agreement with the MLS Sounders in January 2020 and were renamed Sound FC.

== Rivalries ==
The Sounders had local two rivals—the Portland Timbers to the south and the Vancouver Whitecaps to the north. All three teams were successors to their respective NASL teams that competed in the 1970s and 1980s. They competed in the annual Cascadia Cup, which was established by fan organizations in 2004 and has been contested by the teams' MLS successors since 2011. The Sounders won the trophy in 2006 and 2007.

== Supporters ==
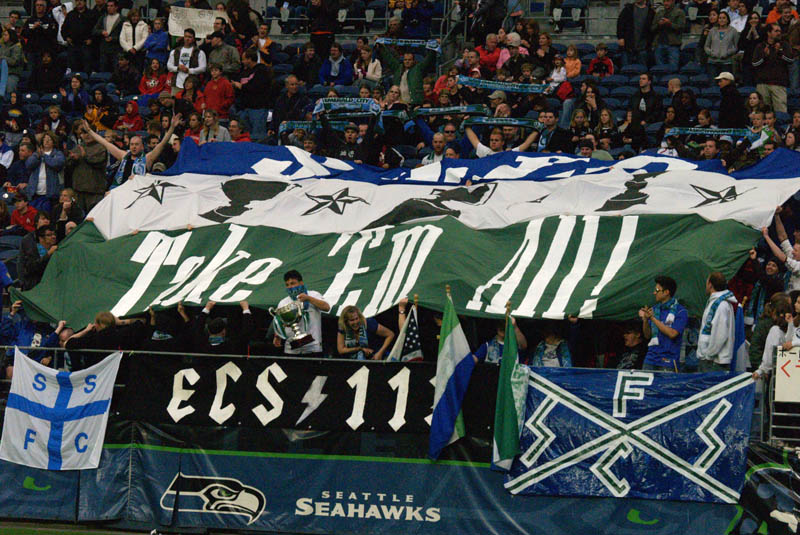
Emerald City Supporters display at the 2008 home opener

The original Seattle Sounders were supported by the Seattle Sounders Booster Club in the 1970s and early 1980s. A small group named "The Pod", named for the Sounders' orca mascot, formed to support the second incarnation of the club in the 1990s. The Emerald City Supporters were formed in 2005 to organize fans and perform songs, chants, and displays during matches. They remained with the club when the Sounders moved to MLS in 2009. The Sounders organization created an official fan club, named the Sounders Legion, in 2007.
