= List of Seattle Sounders (USL) players =

This list comprises all players who have participated in at least one league match for Seattle Sounders from the time the USL began keeping archived records in 2003, until the team's last competitive season in 2008. Players who were on the roster but never played a first team game are not listed; players who appeared for the team in other competitions (US Open Cup, CONCACAF Champions League, etc.) but never actually made an USL appearance are noted at the bottom of the page where appropriate.

A "†" denotes players who only appeared in a single match.
A "*" denotes players who are known to have appeared for the team prior to 2003.

== A ==
- (United States) Seyi Abolaji
- (United States) Chugger Adair *
- (Mexico) Hugo Alcaraz-Cuellar
- (Nigeria) Pedro Amusu *
- (United States) Jason Annicchero *
- (Canada) Robbie Aristodemo
- (Canada) Geoff Aunger *

== B ==
- (United States) Mark Baena *
- (United States) Casey Barber *
- (United States) Kieran Barton *
- (Jamaica) Patrick Beech *
- (Algeria) Fawzi Belal
- (United States) Alex Bengard
- (United States) Jacob Besagno
- (United States) Nikolas Besagno
- (United States) Rees Bettinger *
- (United States) Tom Bialek *
- (Costa Rica) Jonathan Bolaños
- (United States) Jason Boyce *
- (United States) Nate Boyden
- (United States) Chad Brown
- (United States) Preston Burpo

== C ==
- (United States) Sean Michael Callahan
- (United States) J.P. Capodanno *
- (United States) Mike Casale *
- (United States) Jason Cascio
- (Costa Rica) Franklin Chacón
- (United States) Brian Ching *
- (United States) Billy Colelo *
- (United States) John Cowmay *
- (United States) Billy Crook *
- (United States) Derek Crothers *
- (United States) Rich Cullen *

== D ==
- (United States) Nate Daligcon *
- (Jamaica) Fabian Davis *
- (United States) Ben Dragavon
- (United States) Oscar Draguicevich *
- (United States) James Dunn *
- (United States) Jason Dunn *
- (United States) Tom Dutra *
- (United States) Andrew Dallman *

== E ==
- (United States) Dion Earl *
- (United States) Ryan Edwards
- (United States) Mike Enneking *
- (United States) Chris Eylander

== F ==
- (United States) Chris Farnsworth *
- (United States) Jason Farrell *
- (United States) Eddie Fernandez *
- (United States) Vincente Figueroa *
- (United States) John Fishbaugher
- (United States) Greg Foisie
- (United States) Kevin Forrest
- (United States) Chance Fry *
- (United States) Robby Fulton

== G ==
- (United States) Mike Gailey *
- (Cuba) Maykel Galindo
- (United States) Josh Gardner
- (United States) Shawn Gaw *
- (United States) Paul Gelvezon *
- (United States) Herculez Gomez *
- (United States) Taylor Graham
- (United States) Andrew Gregor
- (United States) Henry Gutierrez

== H ==
- (United States) Marcus Hahnemann *
- (United States) Peter Hattrup *
- (United States) Jordan Harvey
- (Trinidad and Tobago) Brian Haynes *
- (Canada) Ollie Heald *
- (England) Gary Heale *
- (United States) Pat Henderson *
- (United States) Sean Henderson
- (Canada) David Hernandez *
- (Scotland) David Hoggan *
- (United States) Greg Howes
- (United States) Dusty Hudock *
- (United States) Danny Huet *
- (United States) Matt Hulen

== J ==
- (England) Bernie James *
- (England) Danny Jackson
- (United States) Scott Jenkins

== K ==
- (France) Youssouf Kanté
- (United States) Stephen Keel
- (United States) Dominic Kinnear *
- (United States) Kei Kinoshita
- (United States) C. J. Klaas
- (New Zealand) Nathan Knox

== L ==
- (Jamaica) Kevin Lamey *
- (Paraguay) Gerardo Laterza *
- (United States) Joey Leonetti *
- (France) Sébastien Le Toux
- (United States) Roger Levesque

== M ==
- (United States) David Mahoney
- (United States) Randy Mann *
- (United States) Bill May *
- (United States) Bobby McAllister *
- (United States) Dick McCormick *
- (United States) Bryan McNiel *
- (United States) Shawn Medved *
- (United States) Neil Megson *
- (United States) Noah Merl
- (United States) Doug Morrill *
- (United States) Shannon Murray *

== N ==
- (Germany) Alexander Nouri *
- (The Gambia) Sanna Nyassi
- (United States) Viet Nguyen *

== O ==
- (United States) Ciaran O'Brien
- (United States) Leighton O'Brien

== P ==
- (United States) Charles Paulson*
- (United States) Shawn Percell
- (United States) Michael Perrin *
- (South Africa) Dylin Pillay *
- (United States) Eugene Poublon *
- (United States) Brandon Prideaux *
- (United States) Sean Purcell

== R ==
- (Mexico) Santa Maria Rivera
- (Canada) Marco Rizi *
- (United States) Ralph Robertson *
- (United States) Esmundo Rodriguez *
- (Costa Rica) Michael Rodríguez
- (United States) Ian Russell *

== S ==
- (United States) Jake Sagare
- (United States) Kevin Sakuda
- (United States) Darren Sawatzky
- (United States) Brian Schmetzer *
- (United States) Andre Schmid
- (United States) Zach Scott
- (United States) George Singh *
- (United States) Billy Sleeth
- (United States) Kyle Smith
- (United States) Ben Somoza
- (Germany) Tim Steidten *
- (United States) Jason Stoddard *
- (United States) Erik Storkson *
- (United States) Gabe Sturm
- (United States) Jamal Sutton

== T ==
- (United States) Stoner Tadlock *
- Andrade Taffalo *
- (Canada) Niall Thompson *
- (Jamaica) Craig Tomlinson
- (United States) Kenji Treschuk

== U ==
- (United States) Ali John Utush *
- (United States) Rashid Utush *

== V ==
- (Puerto Rico) Marco Vélez

== W ==
- (United States) Craig Waibel *
- (United States) James Ward
- (Canada) Mark Watson *
- (United States) Cam Weaver
- (United States) Wade Webber *
- (Brazil) Welton
- (United States) Adam West
- (United States) Brent Whitfield
- (United States) Brett Wiesner
- (United States) Mark Wittstruck

== Sources ==
- "USL-1 Team History". uslsoccer.com. United Soccer Leagues. Archived from the original on February 5, 2013.
