= List of Seattle Sounders FC players =

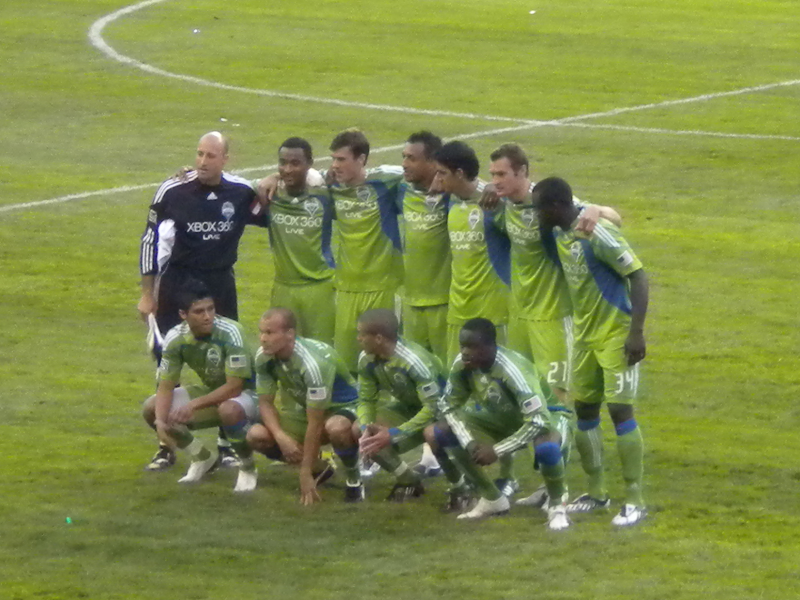
Starting players before a 2009 Sounders FC match

Seattle Sounders FC is an American soccer club founded in 2008, after the city of Seattle was awarded a Major League Soccer (MLS) franchise. Sounders FC began playing competitive soccer in the 2009 season. It plays its home games at Lumen Field, competing in the Western Conference of the MLS. The current Sounders FC is the third soccer team from Seattle to bear the Sounders nickname. The tradition was started by Seattle's North American Soccer League team in 1974, and continued by the city's United Soccer Leagues side, formed in 1994. The current Sounders FC is an entity distinct to both of these clubs, and played its first MLS game on March 19, 2009.

As of the start of the 2021 season, a total of 125 players have participated in at least one league match for Sounders FC. Raúl Ruidíaz is the club's all-time top goal scorer, and Nicolás Lodeiro is club's all-time leader in assists.

== Players ==
A Major League Soccer club's active roster consists of up to 30 players. All 30 players are eligible for selection to each 18-player game-day squad during the regular season and playoffs. Players who were contracted to the club but never played a regular season MLS game are not listed below.

All statistics are for MLS regular season games only, including the group stage of the 2020 MLS is Back Tournament, and are correct as of February 3, 2026.

Key

DF = Defender

MF = Midfielder

FW = Forward/striker

=== Outfield players ===
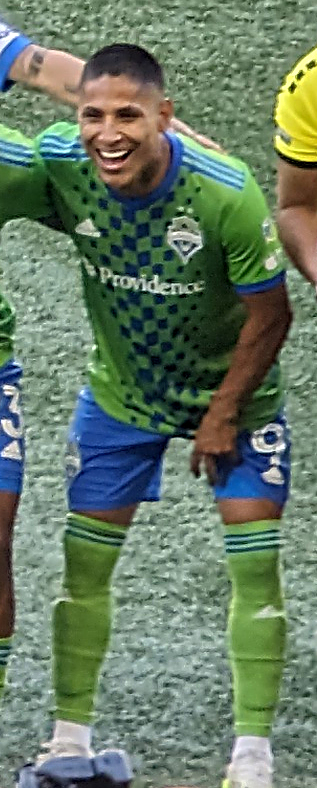
Raúl Ruidíaz is the Sounders all-time leading goal scorer.

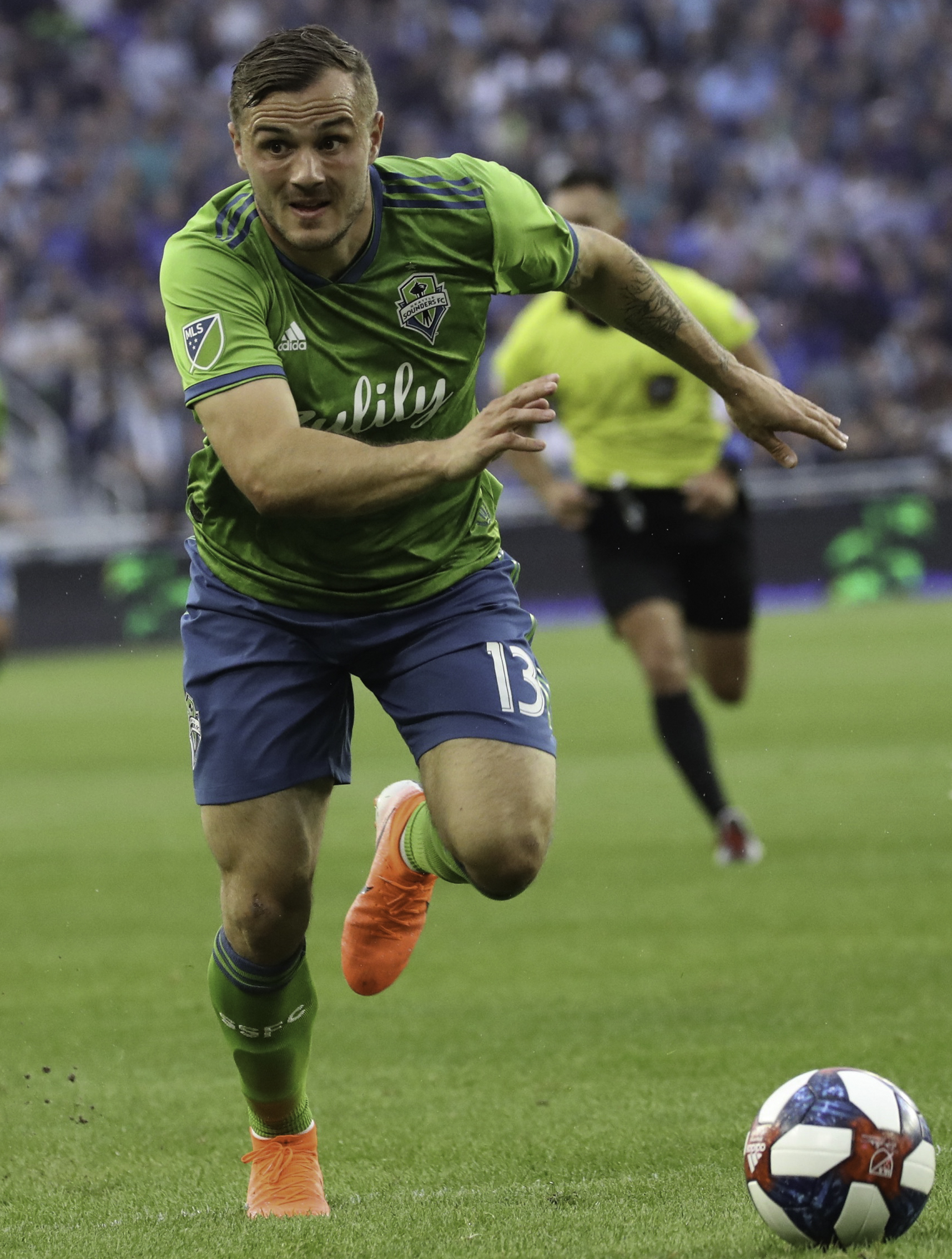
Mercer Island native Jordan Morris is second in all time goals.

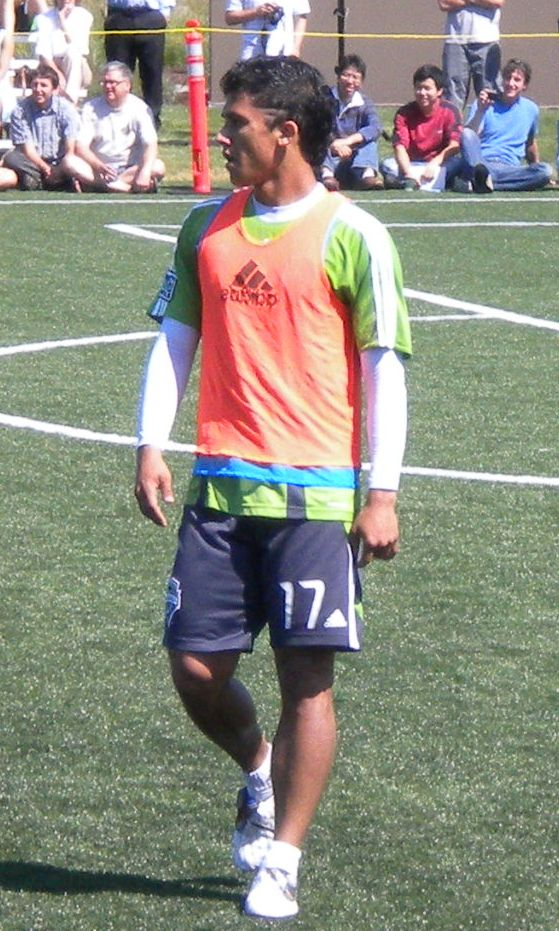
Fredy Montero is the third in all time goals.

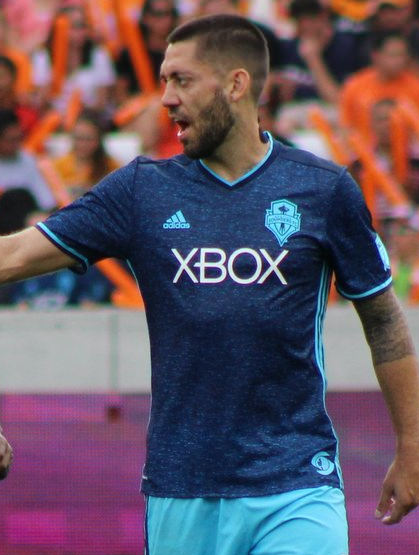
Clint Dempsey is Sounders FC's fourth leading scorer.

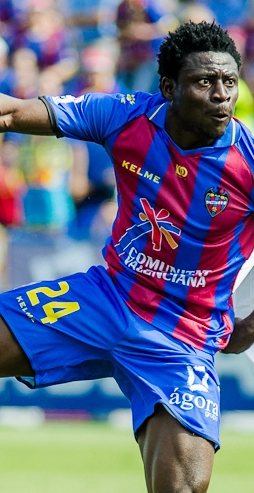
Obafemi Martins is Sounders FC's sixth all-time leader in goals.

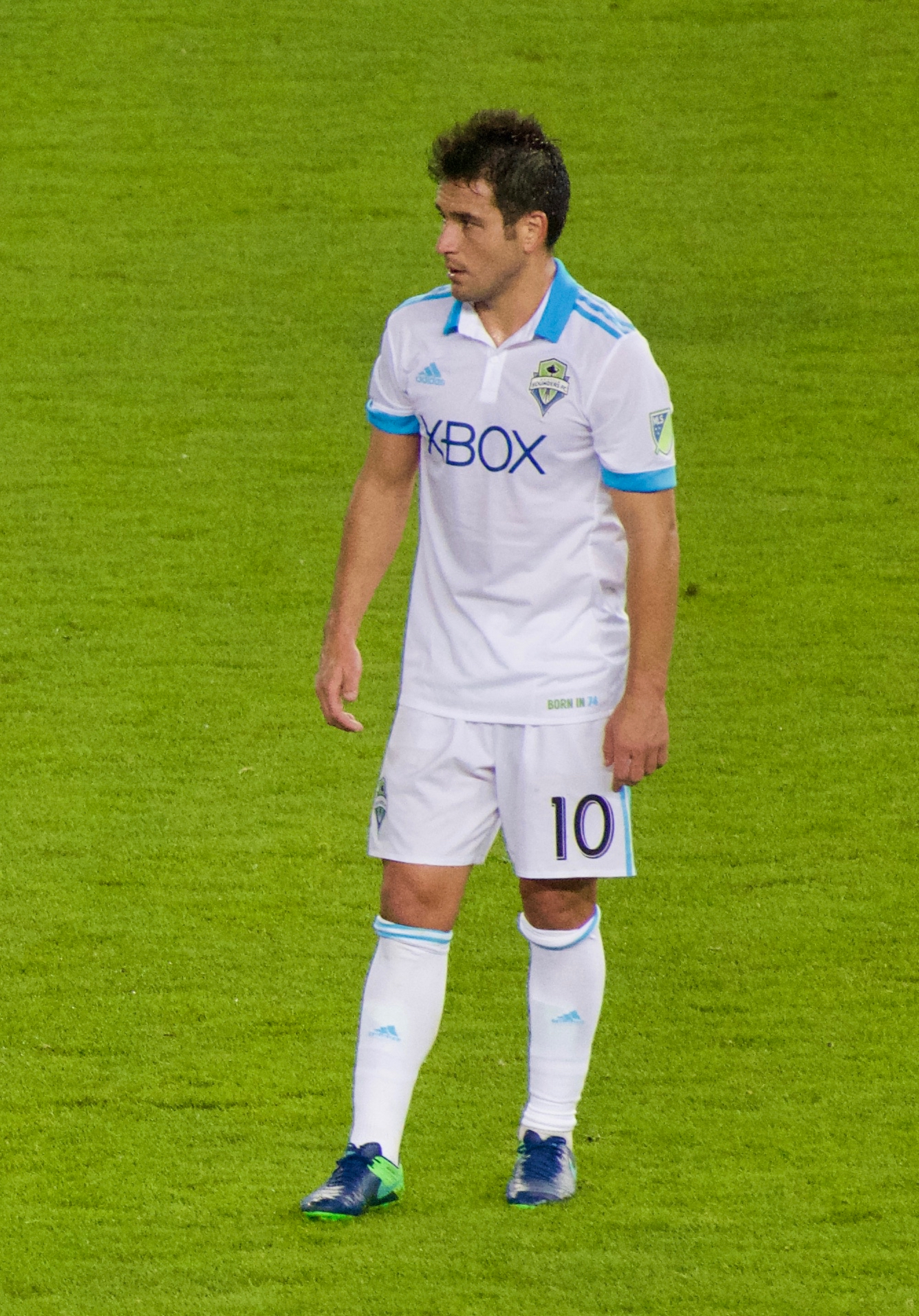
Nicolás Lodeiro is Sounders FC's all-time leader in assists.

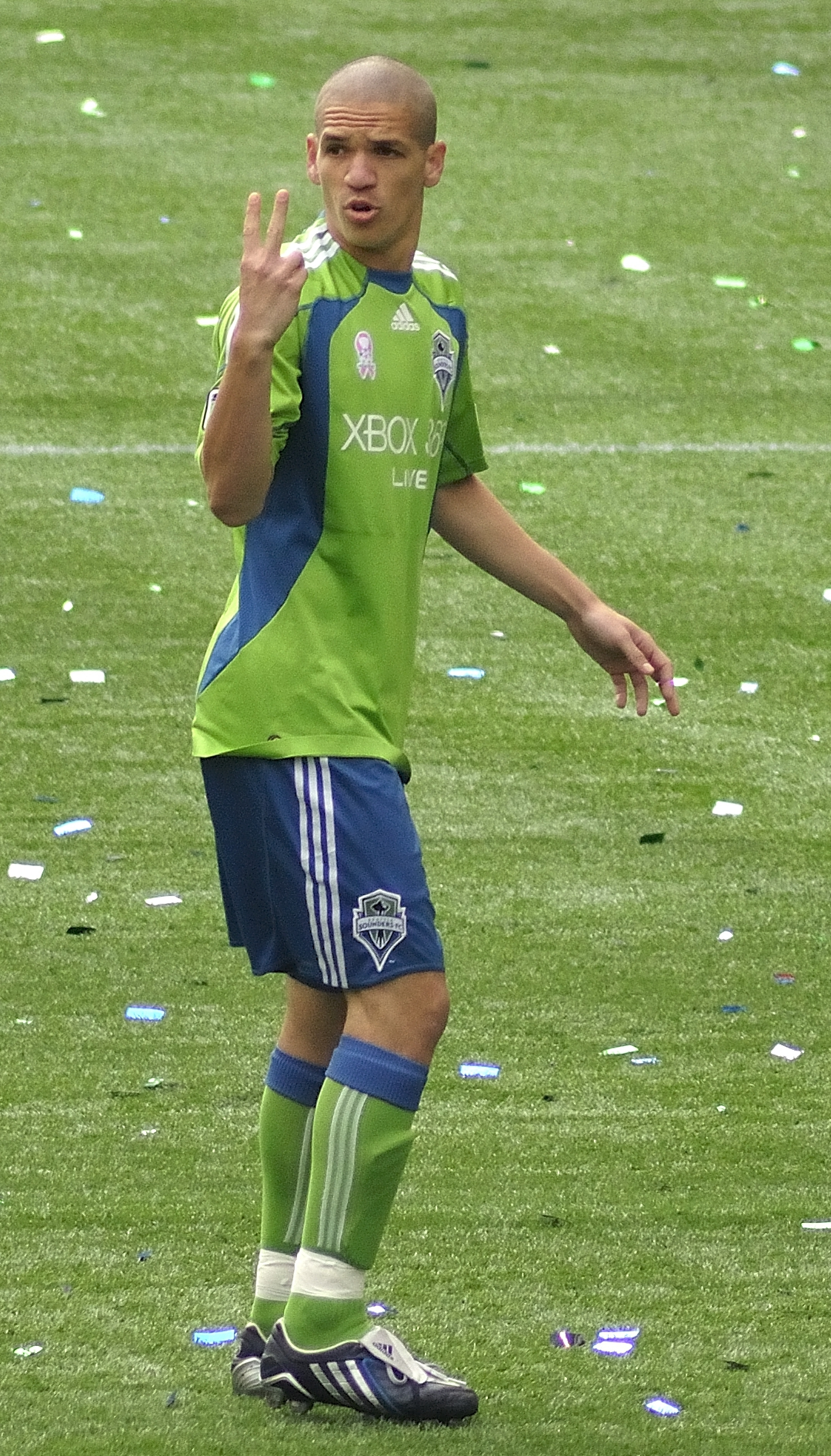
Osvaldo Alonso is second in all time appearances.

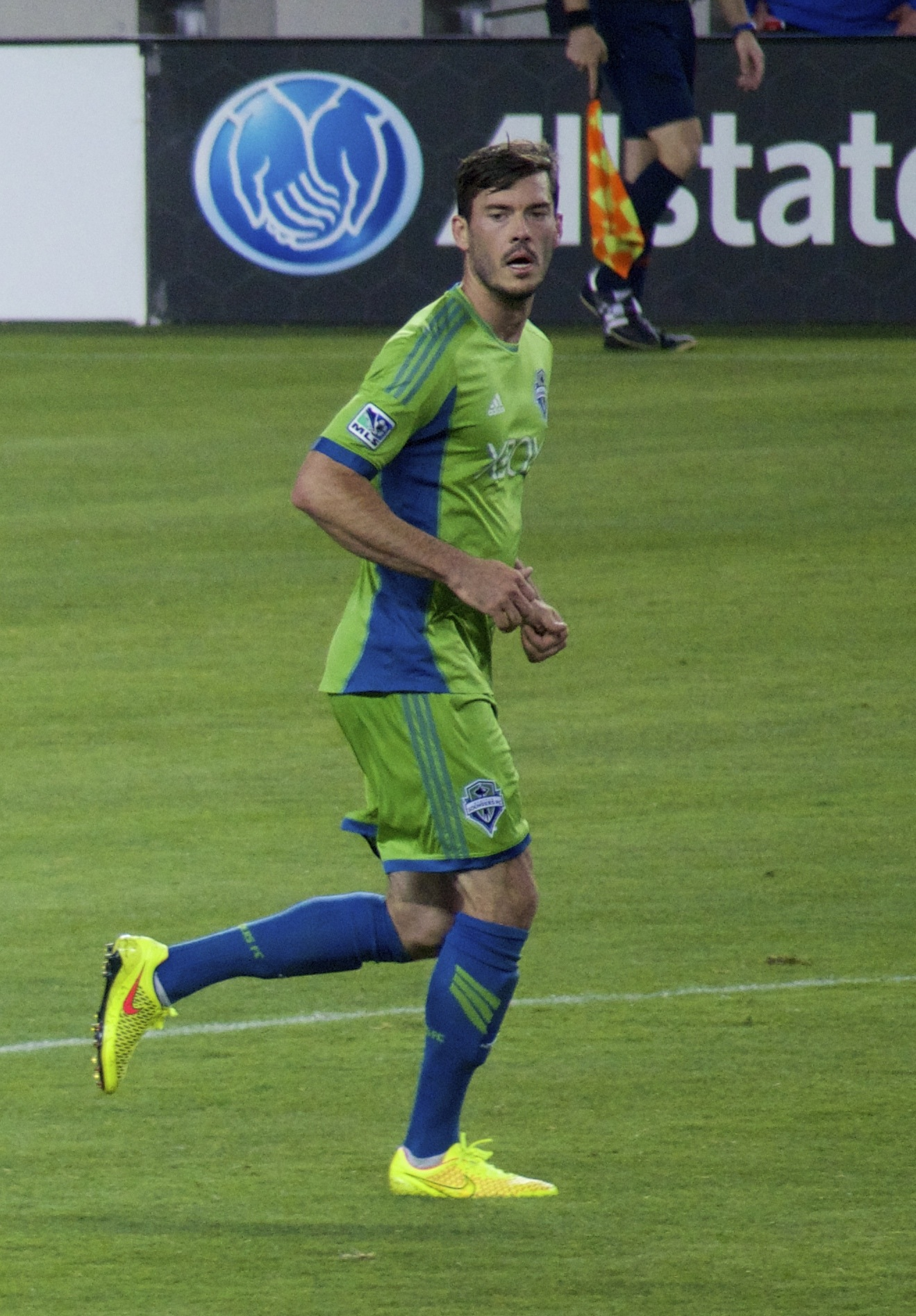
US international Brad Evans is fifth in all time appearances.

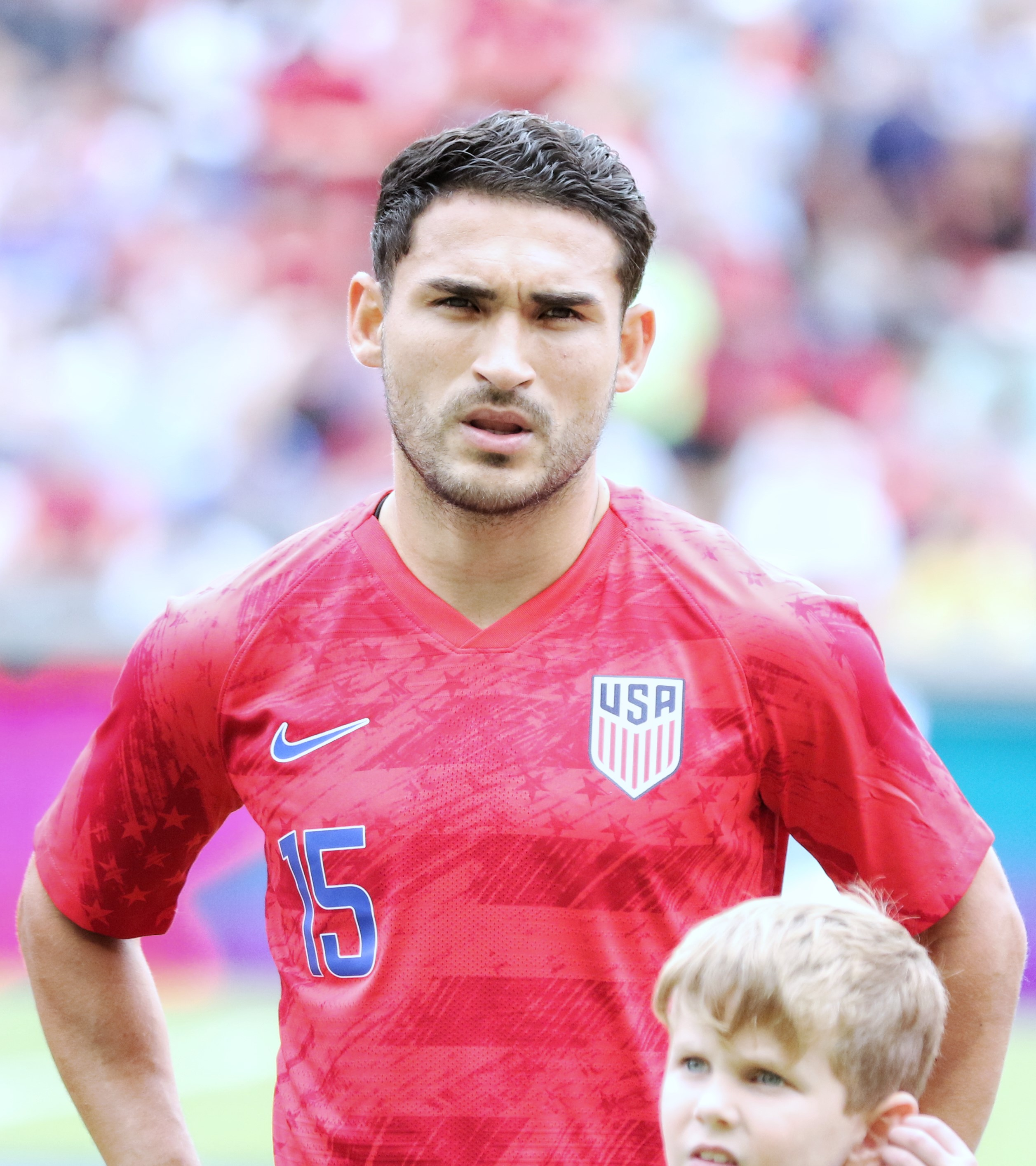
US international Cristian Roldan has the most appearances for an outfield player.

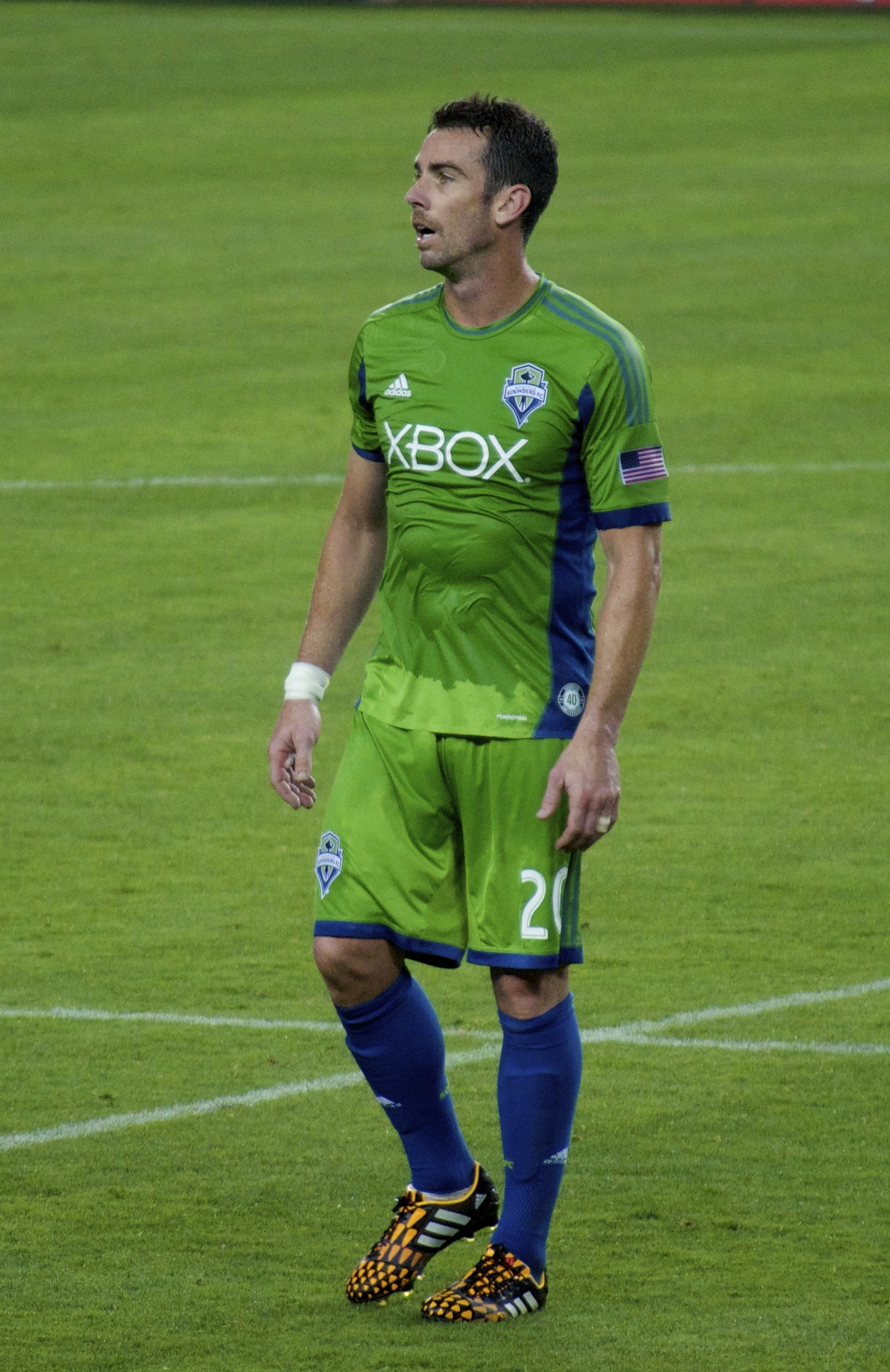
Since 2002 Zach Scott has made over 250 total appearances for the Sounders including both the MLS and USL teams

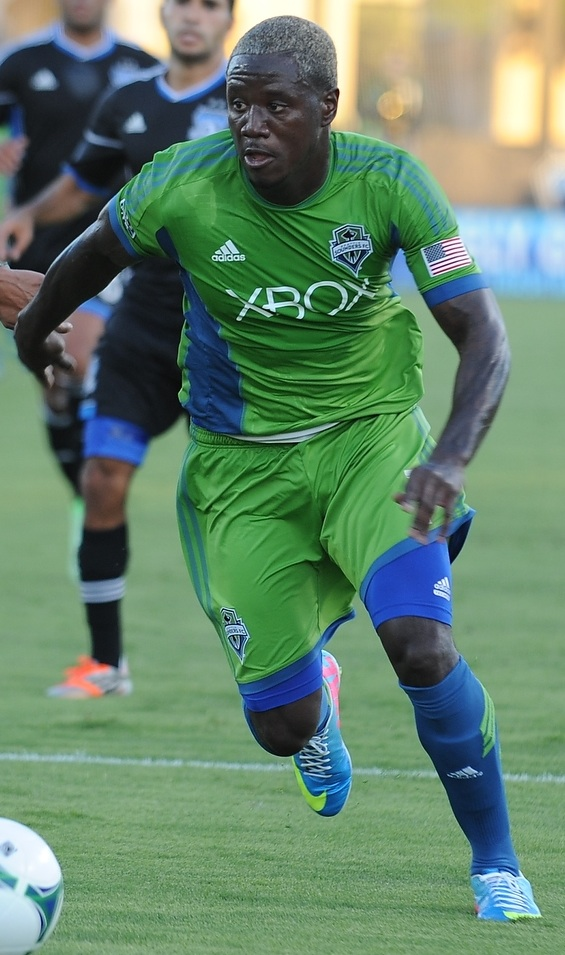
Former Sounder Eddie Johnson has 63 caps for the United States.

Name	Position	Country	Years	Games	Goals	Assists	Notes
Saad Abdul-Salaam	DF	USA	2019	18	0	1	
Seyi Adekoya	FW	USA	2017–2018	2	0	0	
Samuel Adeniran	FW	USA	2021–2022	4	0	0	
Tony Alfaro	DF	Mexico	2016–2018	25	0	0	
Osvaldo Alonso	MF	Cuba	2009–2018	277	10	24	
Oalex Anderson	FW	St. Vincent	2016	15	0	0	
Jalil Anibaba	DF	USA	2014	16	0	1	
Xavier Arreaga	DF	Ecuador	2019–2024	100	3	2	
Paul Arriola	MF	USA	2025–	2	0	0	
Josh Atencio	MF	USA	2019–	91	1	4	
Michael Azira	MF	Uganda	2014–2015	25	0	0	
Cody Baker	DF	USA	2023–	28	0	1	
Reed Baker-Whiting	MF	USA	2021–	61	0	2	
Chad Barrett	FW	USA	2014–2015	44	12	1	
Jonathan Bell	DF	USA	2024–2025	31	1	0	
Nicolas Benezet	MF	France	2021	13	3	1	
Tristan Bowen	FW	USA	2014	2	0	0	
Will Bruin	FW	USA	2017–2022	132	27	13	
Snyder Brunell	MF	USA	2024–	6	2	0	
Marc Burch	DF	USA	2012–2013	49	0	7	
Handwalla Bwana	MF	Somalia	2018–2020	32	4	3	
Jonathan Campbell	DF	USA	2019	4	0	0	
Servando Carrasco	MF	USA	2011–2013	40	1	1	
Alex Caskey	MF	USA	2012–2013	30	1	4	
Cordell Cato	FW	Trinidad and Tobago	2012	8	0	1	
Emanuel Cecchini	MF	Argentina	2019	4	0	0	
Léo Chú	FW	Brazil	2021–2024	79	7	14	
Abdoulaye Cissoko	DF	France	2021–2023	26	0	0	
Kenny Cooper	FW	USA	2014–2015	22	3	4	
Andy Craven	FW	USA	2015–2016	3	0	0	
Osaze De Rosario	FW	Guyana	2025–	12	1	0	
Pedro de la Vega	FW	Argentina	2024–	42	5	6	
Jordy Delem	DF	Martinique	2017–2021	74	1	3	
Clint Dempsey	MF	USA	2013–2018	115	47	28	
Justin Dhillon	FW	USA	2019–2020	6	0	0	
Ethan Dobbelaere	MF	USA	2020–2023	19	0	0	
David Estrada	FW	USA	2010–2014	41	5	0	
Brad Evans	MF	USA	2009–2017	200	20	27	
Michael Farfan	MF	USA	2016	1	0	0	
Álvaro Fernández	MF	Uruguay	2010–2012, 2016–2017	75	14	4	
Jesús Ferreira	FW	USA	2025–	32	4	7	
Oniel Fisher	DF	Jamaica	2015–2017	27	0	1	
Waylon Francis	DF	Costa Rica	2018	11	0	1	
Erik Friberg	MF	Sweden	2011, 2015–2016	64	1	6	
Mike Fucito	FW	USA	2010–2011	23	3	2	
Hérculez Gómez	FW	USA	2016	21	0	0	
Yeimar Gómez	DF	Colombia	2020–	167	7	2	
Leonardo González	DF	Costa Rica	2009–2015	137	2	4	
Taylor Graham	DF	USA	2009–2011	1	0	0	
Stuart Hawkins	DF	USA	2024–	4	0	0	
Héber	FW	Brazil	2023	22	2	1	
Shandon Hopeau	FW	USA	2019–2021	6	0	0	
Jhon Kennedy Hurtado	DF	Colombia	2009–2013	108	1	3	
Patrick Ianni	DF	USA	2009–2013	83	3	2	
Miguel Ibarra	FW	USA	2020	12	0	0	
Andreas Ivanschitz	MF	Austria	2015–2016	34	4	9	
Nate Jaqua	FW	USA	2009–2011	66	9	12	
Adam Johansson	DF	Sweden	2012	21	0	2	
Eddie Johnson	FW	USA	2012–2013	49	23	5	
Darwin Jones	FW	USA	2015–2016	11	0	0	
Joevin Jones	DF	Trinidad and Tobago	2016–2017, 2019–2020	93	5	19	
Shalrie Joseph	MF	Grenada	2013	10	1	0	
Kim Kee-hee	DF	South Korea	2018–2019, 2025–	74	0	1	
Ryan Kent	MF	England	2025	15	0	4	
Stephen King	MF	USA	2009	10	0	0	
Peter Kingston	MF	USA	2025–	1	0	0	
Sota Kitahara	MF	USA	2023–2024	3	0	0	
Kalani Kossa-Rienzi	MF	USA	2024–	23	3	3	
Aaron Kovar	MF	USA	2014–2018	32	1	0	
Sébastien Le Toux	MF	France	2009	28	1	3	
Kelvin Leerdam	DF	Suriname	2017–2020	91	9	12	
Roger Levesque	FW	USA	2009–2012	53	6	2	
Danny Leyva	MF	USA	2019–2025	82	0	6	
Freddie Ljungberg	MF	Sweden	2009–2010	37	2	12	
Nicolás Lodeiro	MF	Uruguay	2016–2023	191	41	80	
Antino Lopez	DF	USA	2024–	2	0	0	
Philip Lund	MF	Denmark	2013	1	0	0	
Victor Mansaray	FW	USA	2015–2017	3	0	0	
Chad Marshall	DF	USA	2014–2019	156	10	6	
Tyrone Marshall	DF	Jamaica	2009–2010	46	3	3	
Mario Martínez	MF	Honduras	2012–2013	13	0	1	
Obafemi Martins	FW	Nigeria	2013–2015	72	40	23	
Jordan McCrary	DF	USA	2018	15	0	0	
Tyrone Mears	DF	England	2015–2016	65	1	5	
Jimmy Medranda	DF	Colombia	2020–2022	46	4	6	
Georgi Minoungou	DF	Ivory Coast	2024–	31	2	4	
Adam Moffat	MF	Scotland	2013	6	0	0	
Miguel Montaño	FW	Colombia	2010–2011	8	0	0	
Fredy Montero	FW	Colombia	2009–2014, 2021–2023	191	59	43	
Jordan Morris	FW	USA	2016–	213	71	31	
Danny Musovski	FW	USA	2024–	55	15	5	
Nathan	DF	Brazil	2024	4	0	0	
Lamar Neagle	FW	USA	2011, 2013–2015, 2017–2018	130	28	17	
Blaise Nkufo	FW	Switzerland	2010	11	5	0	
Pat Noonan	FW	USA	2010–2011	21	1	1	
Sanna Nyassi	MF	Gambia	2009–2010	38	2	3	
Shane O'Neill	DF	USA	2020–2021	45	1	0	
A. Ocampo-Chavez	FW	USA	2019–2022	3	0	0	
Sammy Ochoa	FW	USA	2011–2013	17	3	1	
Jimmy Ockford	DF	USA	2014–2016	1	0	0	
Sean Okoli	FW	USA	2014–2015	3	0	0	
Marco Pappa	MF	Guatemala	2014–2015	49	9	11	
Jeff Parke	DF	USA	2010–2012	78	1	2	
João Paulo	MF	Brazil	2020–2025	119	6	19	
Gonzalo Pineda	MF	Mexico	2014–2015	56	4	9	
Jackson Ragen	DF	USA	2022–	112	5	2	
Dylan Remick	DF	USA	2013–2016	44	0	0	
James Riley	DF	USA	2009–2011	84	1	9	
Victor Rodríguez	MF	Spain	2017–2019	43	9	10	
Alex Roldan	MF	El Salvador	2018–	193	4	19	
Cristian Roldan	MF	USA	2015–	307	37	51	
Mauro Rosales	MF	Argentina	2011–2013	86	12	34	
Andy Rose	MF	England	2012–2015	82	5	7	
Paul Rothrock	MF	USA	2023–	62	10	9	
Kelyn Rowe	MF	USA	2021–2023	71	2	6	
Raúl Ruidíaz	FW	Peru	2018–2024	139	72	13	
Albert Rusnák	MF	Slovakia	2022–	125	29	32	
Amadou Sanyang	MF	Gambia	2011	1	0	0	
Mike Seamon	MF	USA	2010–2012	9	0	1	
Zach Scott	DF	USA	2009–2016	118	1	1	
Harry Shipp	MF	USA	2017–2020	64	10	7	
Luis Silva	MF	Mexico	2019	5	0	0	
Christian Sivebæk	MF	Denmark	2012	3	0	0	
Brad Smith	DF	Australia	2018–2019, 2020–2021	63	3	11	
Nathan Sturgis	MF	USA	2009–2010, 2016	29	1	2	
Gustav Svensson	MF	Sweden	2017–2020	90	4	6	
Dylan Teves	MF	USA	2022–2024	25	2	0	
Thomás	MF	Brazil	2015	11	1	1	
Christian Tiffert	MF	Germany	2012	12	0	3	
Nouhou Tolo	DF	Cameroon	2017–	222	2	10	
Román Torres	DF	Panama	2015–2019, 2020	69	1	3	
Djimi Traoré	DF	Mali	2013–2014	42	1	0	
Peter Vagenas	MF	USA	2009–2010	21	0	2	
Nelson Valdez	FW	Paraguay	2015–2016	31	1	2	
Obed Vargas	MF	Mexico	2021–2025	92	4	12	
Alex Villanueva	DF	USA	2021	2	0	0	
Tyson Wahl	DF	USA	2009–2011	39	1	3	
Cam Weaver	FW	USA	2014	3	0	0	
O'Brian White	FW	Jamaica	2011	7	2	2	
Henry Wingo	MF	USA	2017–2019	22	0	0	
Magnus Wolff Eikrem	MF	Norway	2018	15	1	1	
DeAndre Yedlin	DF	USA	2013–2014	56	1	6	
Steve Zakuani	MF	DR Congo	2009–2013	80	17	14	
Eriq Zavaleta	FW	El Salvador	2013–2014	5	0	0	

=== Goalkeepers ===
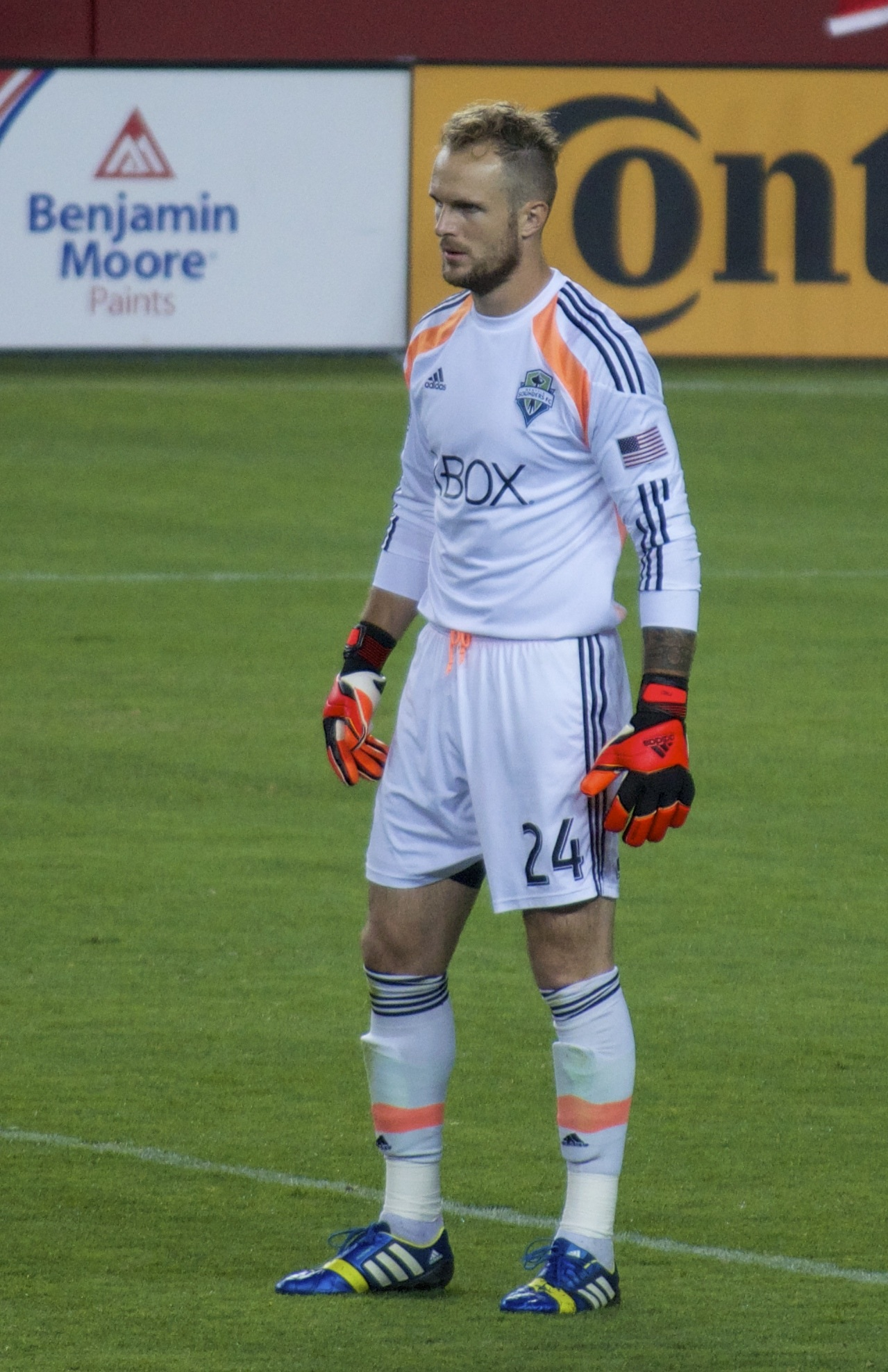
All-time appearance leader Stefan Frei

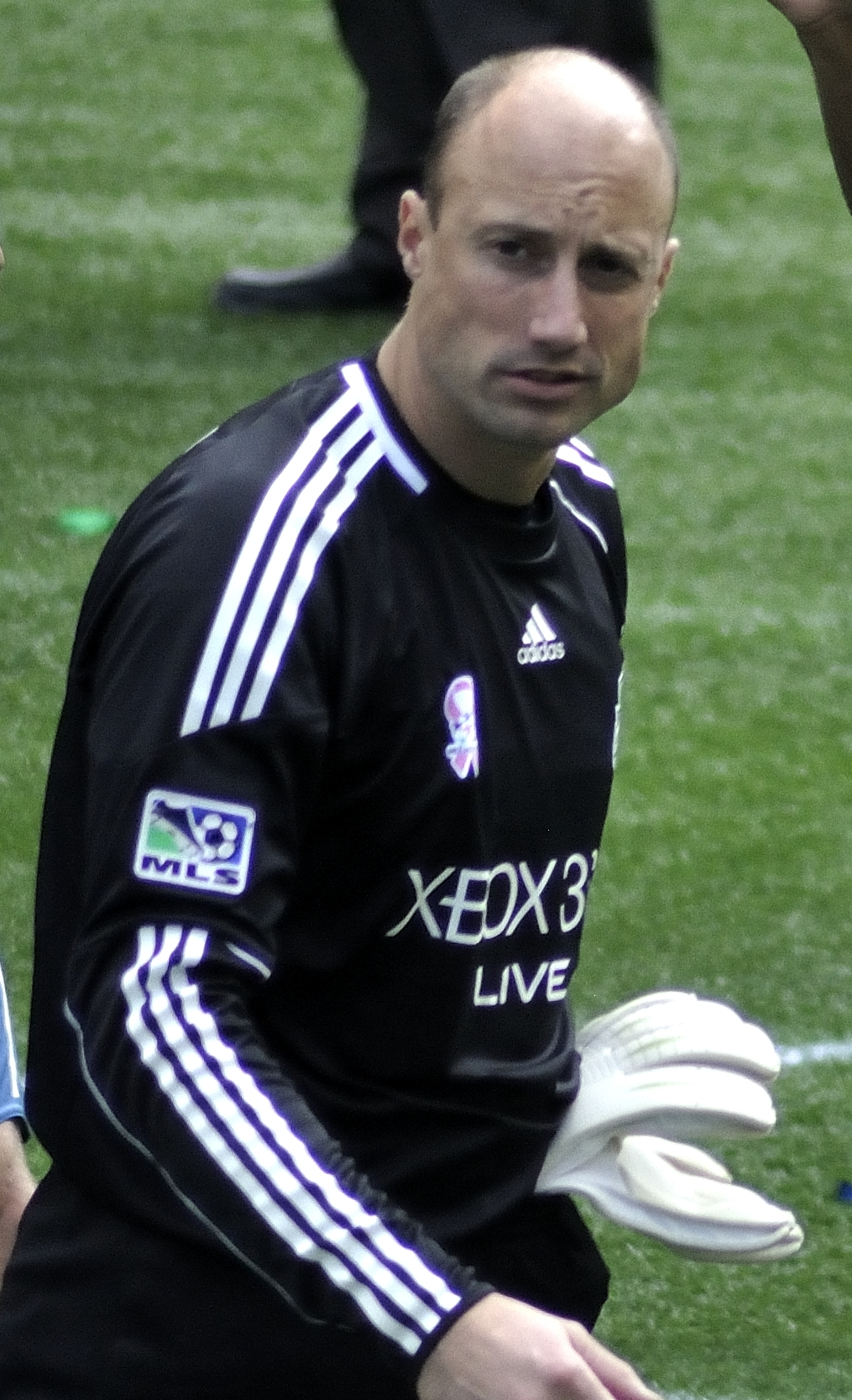
Former Sounders FC captain Kasey Keller

In their history the Seattle Sounders FC have used three primary goalkeepers. US national team member and Seattle area native Kasey Keller was the goalkeeper for the team's first three seasons. In November 2011, just shy of his 42nd birthday, Keller retired. Austrian Michael Gspurning was brought in as Keller's replacement in 2012. After two seasons Gspurning and the Sounders FC front office were unable to come to an agreement on a contract and Gspurning was released. Toronto FC traded Stefan Frei to the Sounders in December 2013. Frei would be the first choice goalkeeper for the Sounders from the 2014 season to present.

Name	Country	Years	Games	Conceded	Shutouts (Note: A shutout occurs when a goalkeeper plays in a game without conceding a goal. This is sometimes known outside North America as a clean sheet.)	Notes
Terry Boss	Puerto Rico	2009–2011	1	1	0	
Stefan Cleveland	USA	2020–2023	29	37	4	
Ben Dragavon	USA	2009	1	1	0	
Chris Eylander	USA	2009	1	2	0	
Stefan Frei	Switzerland	2014–	351	406	107	
Michael Gspurning	Austria	2012–2013	49	50	18	
Marcus Hahnemann	USA	2012–2014	4	4	1	
Kasey Keller	USA	2009–2011	93	97	30	
Bryan Meredith	USA	2011–2012, 2017–2019	13	17	3	
Tyler Miller	USA	2016–2017	2	5	0	
Troy Perkins	USA	2015	4	3	0	
Spencer Richey	USA	2021	2	0	2	
Andrew Thomas	Russia	2021–	15	25	3	
Andrew Weber	USA	2012, 2013	6	7	0	

== By nationality ==
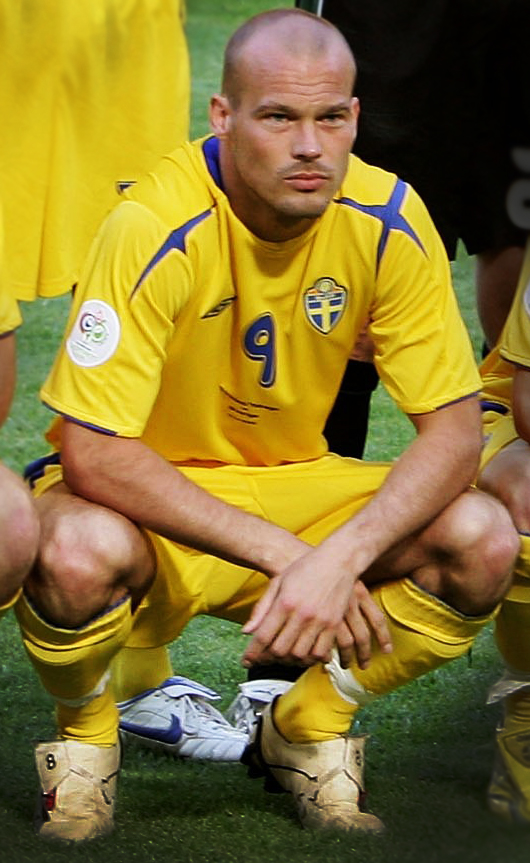
Freddie Ljungberg has represented the Sweden national team, as well as several European clubs.

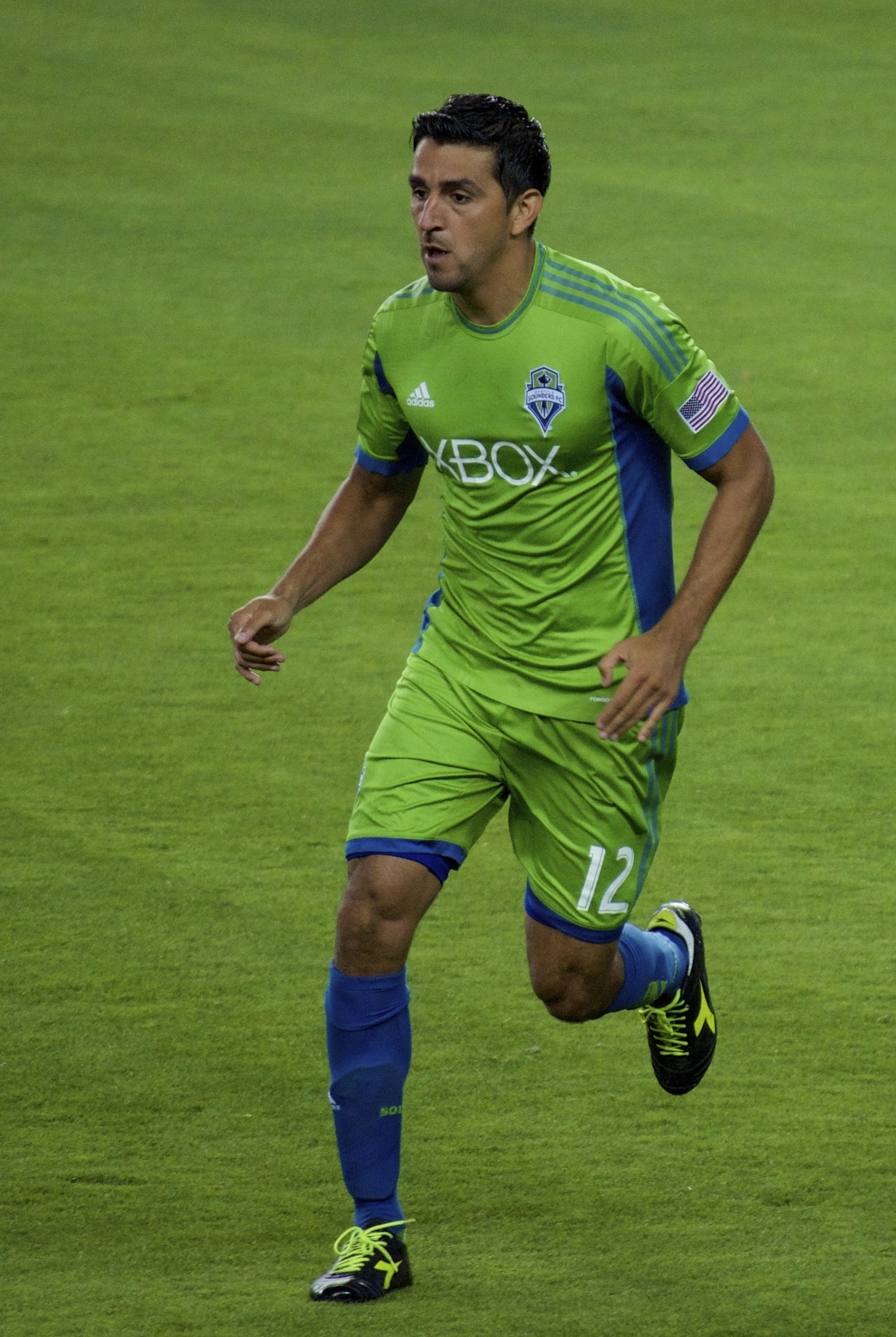
Leonardo González has over 60 caps for Costa Rica.

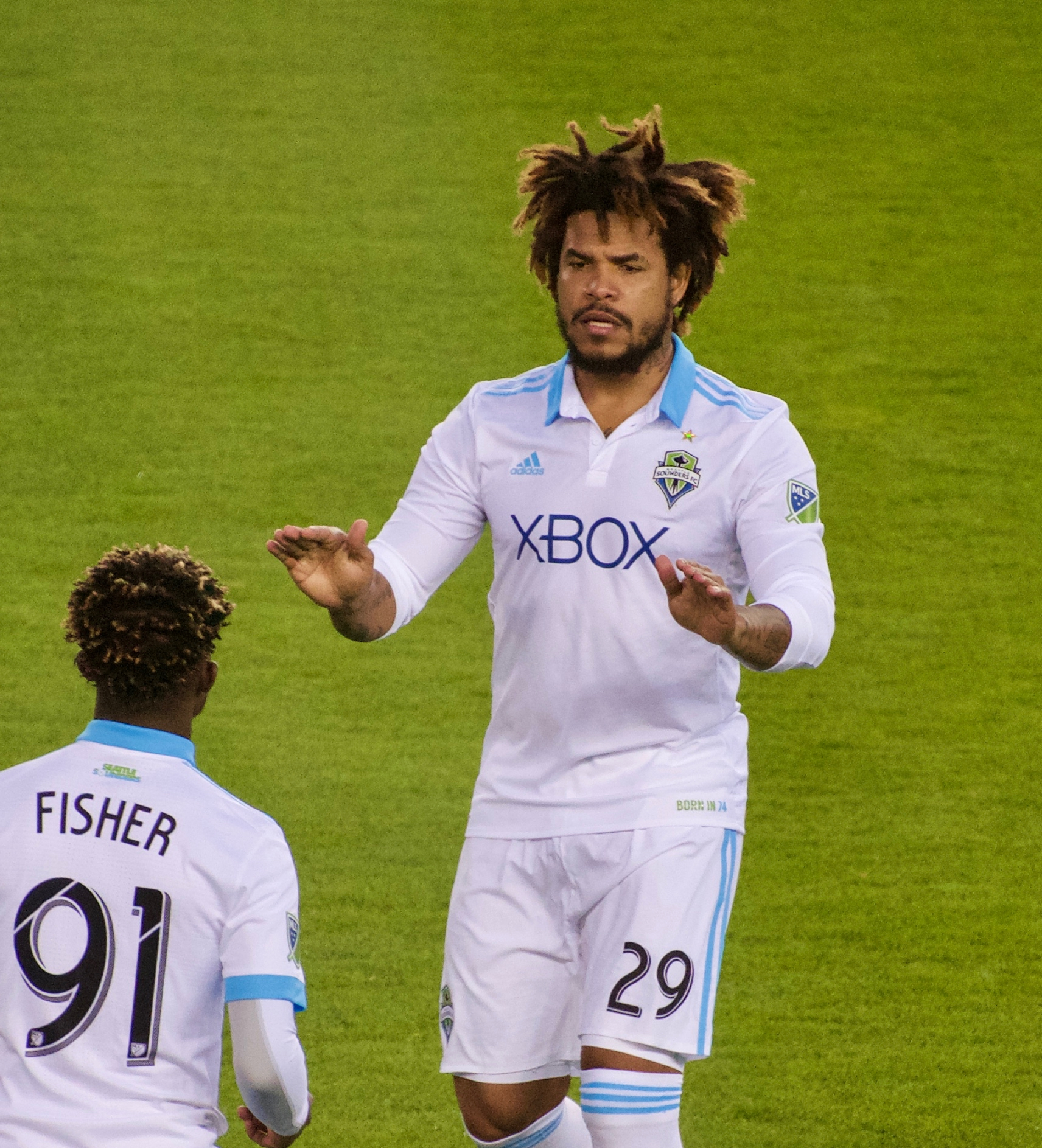
Román Torres led Panama to the 2018 World Cup.

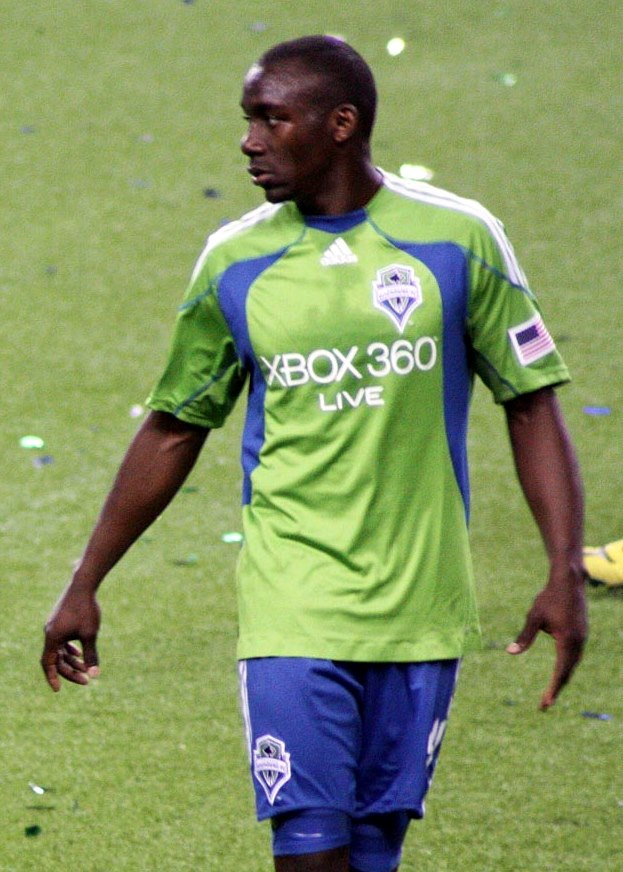
Jhon Kennedy Hurtado is one of five Colombians to play for the Sounders.

MLS regulations permit teams to name eight players from outside of the United States in their rosters. However, this limit can be exceeded by trading international slots with another MLS team, or if one or more of the overseas players is a refugee or has permanent residency rights in the USA. As of April 24, 2023, 67 players from outside the United States have played in MLS for Seattle Sounders FC.

Country	Number of players	Games
Argentina	3	132
Australia	1	63
Austria	2	83
Brazil	5	235
Cameroon	1	222
Colombia	5	520
Costa Rica	2	148
Cuba	1	277
DR Congo	1	80
Denmark	2	4
Ecuador	1	100
El Salvador	2	193
England	3	162
France	3	67
Gambia	2	39
Germany	1	12
Grenada	1	10
Guatemala	1	49
Guyana	1	12
Ivory Coast	1	31
Honduras	1	13
Jamaica	3	80
Mali	1	42
Martinique	1	74
Mexico	4	250
Nigeria	1	72
Norway	1	15
Panama	1	69
Paraguay	1	31
Peru	1	139
Puerto Rico	1	1
Russia	1	15
Saint Vincent and the Grenadines	1	15
Scotland	1	6
Slovakia	1	125
Somalia	1	32
South Korea	1	74
Spain	1	43
Suriname	1	91
Sweden	4	212
Switzerland	2	362
Trinidad and Tobago	2	101
Uganda	1	25
Uruguay	2	266
USA	84	3,444

== Additional players ==
In addition to competing in Major League Soccer every year, Sounders FC participate in other competitions such as the Lamar Hunt U.S. Open Cup and the CONCACAF Champions League. Below is a list of players who have not appeared in a league match, but have played for the team in other competitions.

Name	Position	Country	Years	Competitions
Evan Brown	DF	USA	2009	2009 US Open Cup qualifying
Snyder Brunell	MF	USA	2024	2024 US Open Cup
Felix Chenkam	FW	Cameroon	2017–2018	2017 US Open Cup
Osaze De Rosario	FW	Guyana	2024	2024 US Open Cup
Rodrigue Ele	FW	Cameroon	2017–2018	2017 US Open Cup
Kevin Forrest	FW	USA	2009	2009 US Open Cup qualifying
Stuart Hawkins	DF	USA	2024	2024 US Open Cup
Nick Hinds	DF	USA	2018	2018 US Open Cup
Zach Mathers	MF	USA	2016–2017	2016 US Open Cup
Francisco Narbón	MF	Panama	2017	2017 US Open Cup
David Olsen	FW	USA	2018	2018 US Open Cup
Irvin Parra	MF	USA	2017	2017 US Open Cup
Fábio Pereira	MF	Brazil	2014	2014 US Open Cup
Sam Rogers	DF	USA	2017	2017 US Open Cup
Ray Saari	MF	USA	2017–2018	2017 US Open Cup
Jarrod Smith	FW	New Zealand	2009	2009 US Open Cup
Travian Sousa	DF	USA	2023	2023 US Open Cup
Michael Tetteh	MF	Ghana	2011–2012	2011 US Open Cup
Hal Uderitz	DF	USA	2023	2023 US Open Cup

== See also ==
- List of Seattle Sounders (USL) players – list of players who played for Seattle Sounders FC's USL predecessor
- List of Tacoma Defiance players – list of players who play for Seattle Sounders FC's reserve team
