= 2015 Evergreen Premier League =

Evergreen Premier League
- Season: 2015
- Champions: Spokane Shadow (2nd divisional title)
- Top goalscorer: Eleazar Galvan (11)
- Biggest home win: South Sound FC 8–2 Wenatchee FC (23 May 2015)
- Biggest away win: Wenatchee FC 2–8 Spokane Shadow (3 May 2015)
- Highest scoring: Yakima United FC 6–5 Olympic Force (29 May 2015)
- All statistics correct as of 14 March 2017.

The 2015 Evergreen Premier League (referred to as the EPLWA) was the second season of the Evergreen Premier League. The season began on 25 April 2015.

Eight clubs participated. WestSound FC folded and Olympic Force joined the league in 2015.

Spokane Shadow won the Evergreen Premier League title.

== League table ==
Pos	Team	Pld	W	D	L	GF	GA	GD	Pts	Promotion, qualification or relegation
1	Spokane Shadow	14	11	2	1	39	13	+26	35	Champions
2	South Sound FC	14	8	5	1	36	18	+18	29	
3	Vancouver Victory FC	14	8	1	5	31	16	+15	25	
4	Olympic Force	14	6	0	8	28	38	−10	18	
5	Wenatchee United FC	14	5	3	6	27	37	−10	18	
6	Yakima United FC	14	4	3	7	28	31	−3	15	
7	Seattle Stars FC	14	3	3	8	19	32	−13	12	
8	Bellingham United FC	14	2	1	11	23	46	−23	7	

Updated to match(es) played on 14 March 2017. Source: 2015 Evergreen Premier League table
Rules for classification: 1) Points; 2) Total number of wins; 3) Head-to-head points; 4) Goal differential; 5) Goals for; 6) Road goal differential; 7) Home differential 8) Home goals for; 9) Coin toss (2 teams) or drawing of lots (3 or more teams)

== Results ==
Home \ Away	BU	OF	SEA	SOU	SPO	VV	WU	YU
Bellingham United FC		2–3	5–2	1–5	0–2	0–3	6–2	0–4
Olympic Force	4–2		1–0	0–2	0–3	2–4	1–4	5–1
Seattle Stars FC	4–2	1–2		2–3	1–4	1–6	2–1	4–2
South Sound FC	2–2	3–2	3–0		0–0	2–1	8–2	1–1
Spokane Shadow	4–1	5–1	1–1	4–3		0–2	2–1	2–0
Vancouver Victory FC	4–1	0–1	1–1	0–1	0–2		4–1	3–2
Wenatchee United FC	3–1	5–1	0–0	1–1	2–8	1–0		1–0
Yakima United FC	4–0	6–5	1–0	2–2	1–2	1–3	3–3	

Updated to match(es) played on 26 July 2015. Source: EPLWA
Legend: Blue = home team win; Yellow = draw; Red = away team win.

=== Top scorers ===
Rank	Player	Club	Goals
1	Eleazar Galvan	Wenatchee	11
2	Hector Valdovinos	Yakima	8
2	Adam Talley	Spokane	8
4	Tyler Bjork	Bellingham	7
4	Timur Zhividze	Vancouver	7
4	Jesse Esquivel	Yakima	7
