= 2016 Evergreen Premier League =

Evergreen Premier League
- Season: 2016
- Champions: Vancouver Victory FC (1st title)
- Top goalscorer: Tyler Bjork (14)
- Biggest home win: Wenatchee FC 6–0 Olympic Force (31 July 2016)
- Biggest away win: Wenatchee FC 0–6 Spokane Shadow (24 July 2016)
- Highest scoring: Olympic Force 5-6 Yakima United FC (16 July 2016)
- All statistics correct as of 14 March 2017.

The 2016 Evergreen Premier League (referred to as the EPLWA) was the third season of the Evergreen Premier League. The season began on 1 May 2016.

Eight clubs participated.

Vancouver Victory FC won the Evergreen Premier League title.

== League table ==
Pos	Team	Pld	W	D	L	GF	GA	GD	Pts	Promotion, qualification or relegation
1	Vancouver Victory FC	14	10	2	2	30	17	+13	32	Champions
2	Bellingham United FC	14	9	1	4	34	28	+6	28	
3	Spokane Shadow	14	9	1	4	30	19	+11	28	
4	South Sound FC	14	6	1	7	25	25	0	19	
5	Wenatchee United FC	14	5	2	7	24	28	−4	17	
6	Seattle Stars FC	14	4	2	8	21	28	−7	14	
7	Yakima United FC	14	4	2	8	27	32	−5	14	
8	Olympic Force	14	2	3	9	28	42	−14	9	

Updated to match(es) played on 14 March 2017. Source: 2016 Evergreen Premier League table
Rules for classification: 1) Points; 2) Total number of wins; 3) Head-to-head points; 4) Goal differential; 5) Goals for; 6) Road goal differential; 7) Home differential 8) Home goals for; 9) Coin toss (2 teams) or drawing of lots (3 or more teams)

== Results ==
Home \ Away	BU	OF	SEA	SOU	SPO	VV	WU	YU
Bellingham United FC		3–1	4–3	2–0	2–1	1–1	4–2	4–2
Olympic Force	6–2		3–3	3–3	0–3	2–3	1–1	5–6
Seattle Stars FC	4–2	1–4		1–2	0–1	1–2	1–2	1–0
South Sound FC	3–2	1–0	0–1		2–3	1–2	3–0	5–2
Spokane Shadow	1–4	5–2	3–1	2–1		0–3	0–2	2–0
Vancouver Victory FC	2–0	3–0	3–1	3–1	2–3		1–0	3–1
Wenatchee United FC	1–2	6–0	1–2	3–1	0–6	1–1		5–2
Yakima United FC	1–2	2–1	1–1	1–2	0–0	5–1	4–0	

Updated to match(es) played on 31 July 2016. Source: EPLWA
Legend: Blue = home team win; Yellow = draw; Red = away team win.

=== Top scorers ===
Rank	Player	Club	Goals
1	Tyler Bjork	Seattle Stars FC	14
2	Fernando Alvarez	Spokane Shadow	10
3	Kyle Witzel	Bellingham United FC	6
3	Miles Nilsen	Olympic Force	6
3	JJ Schmeck	South Sound FC	6
3	Eleazar Galvan	Wenatchee FC	6
