= 2017 Evergreen Premier League =

Evergreen Premier League
- Season: 2017
- Champions: Seattle Stars FC
- Top goalscorer: Tyler Bjork (14)

Locations of the Evergreen Premier League teams

The 2017 Evergreen Premier League (referred to as the EPLWA) was the fourth season of the Evergreen Premier League. The season began on 30 April 2017.

Eight clubs participated. Wenatchee FC folded and Oly Town FC joined the league in 2017.

== League table ==
Pos	Team	Pld	W	D	L	GF	GA	GD	Pts	Promotion, qualification or relegation
1	Seattle Stars FC	14	10	3	1	36	14	+22	33	Champions
2	Bellingham United FC	14	10	2	2	40	15	+25	32	
3	WPSS Shock	14	7	2	5	26	16	+10	23	
4	Vancouver Victory FC	14	5	3	6	32	27	+5	18	
5	Olympic Force	14	4	4	6	15	25	−10	16	
6	Oly Town FC	14	4	3	7	17	26	−9	15	
7	Yakima United FC	14	3	3	8	23	38	−15	12	
8	Spokane Shadow	14	3	0	11	15	43	−28	9	

Updated to match(es) played on 14 March 2017. Source: 2017 Evergreen Premier League table
Rules for classification: 1) Points; 2) Total number of wins; 3) Head-to-head points; 4) Goal differential; 5) Goals for; 6) Road goal differential; 7) Home differential 8) Home goals for; 9) Coin toss (2 teams) or drawing of lots (3 or more teams)

== Results ==
Home \ Away	BU	OT	OF	SEA	SOU	SPO	VV	YU
Bellingham United FC								
Oly Town FC								
Olympic Force								
Seattle Stars FC	–2							
South Sound FC								
Spokane Shadow								
Vancouver Victory FC								
Yakima United FC								

Updated to match(es) played on 14 March 2017. Source: EPLWA
Legend: Blue = home team win; Yellow = draw; Red = away team win.
