= 2014 Evergreen Premier League =

Evergreen Premier League
- Season: 2014
- Champions: Spokane Shadow (1st divisional title)
- Top goalscorer: Tyler Bjork (13)
- Biggest home win: Spokane Shadow 11–0 Seattle Stars FC (19 July 2014)
- Biggest away win: Seattle Stars FC 0–4 Bellingham United FC (18 May 2014); Yakima United FC 0–4 Wenatchee United FC (15 June 2014)
- Highest scoring: Spokane Shadow 11–0 Seattle Stars FC (19 July 2014)
- All statistics correct as of 13 March 2017.

The 2014 Evergreen Premier League (referred to as the EPLWA) was the first season of the Evergreen Premier League. The season began on 26 April 2014.

Eight clubs participated.

Spokane Shadow won the Evergreen Premier League title.

== League table ==
Pos	Team	Pld	W	D	L	GF	GA	GD	Pts	Promotion, qualification or relegation
1	Spokane Shadow	14	10	2	2	36	11	+25	32	Champions
2	South Sound FC	14	10	1	3	24	12	+12	31	
3	Vancouver Victory FC	14	8	1	5	31	25	+6	25	
4	Bellingham United FC	14	6	2	6	32	29	+3	20	
5	Yakima United FC	14	5	1	8	32	37	−5	16	
6	Wenatchee United FC	14	5	0	9	27	34	−7	15	
7	Seattle Stars FC	14	4	2	8	24	38	−14	14	
8	WestSound FC	14	3	1	10	15	35	−20	10	

Updated to match(es) played on 13 March 2017. Source: 2014 Evergreen Premier League table
Rules for classification: 1) Points; 2) Total number of wins; 3) Head-to-head points; 4) Goal differential; 5) Goals for; 6) Road goal differential; 7) Home differential 8) Home goals for; 9) Coin toss (2 teams) or drawing of lots (3 or more teams)

== Results ==
Home \ Away	BU	SEA	SOU	SPO	VV	WU	WS	YU
Bellingham United FC		3–3	1–2	0–2	2–0	4–2	0–1	8–2
Seattle Stars FC	0–4		0–1	1–4	0–1	5–1	4–1	2–2
South Sound FC	2–1	0–2		1–1	4–1	2–1	3–0	2–0
Spokane Shadow	1–2	11–0	1–0		1–1	3–0	1–0	2–3
Vancouver Victory FC	5–1	3–2	0–2	1–2		3–1	4–0	5–4
Wenatchee United FC	2–5	1–2	3–1	2–3	3–1		2–0	3–1
WestSound FC	1–1	2–1	0–2	0–3	2–4	4–2		2–3
Yakima United FC	6–0	4–2	1–2	0–1	1–2	0–4	5–2	

Updated to match(es) played on 20 July 2014. Source: EPLWA
Legend: Blue = home team win; Yellow = draw; Red = away team win.

=== Top scorers ===
Rank	Player	Club	Goals
1	Tyler Bjork	Bellingham	13
2	Mike Ramos	Spokane	11
3	Hector Valdovinos	Yakima	9
4	Eleazar Galvan	Wenatchee	7
4	Jordan Jones	Vancouver	7
6	Jesse Esquivel	Yakima	6
6	Mizra Ramic	Vancouver	6
8	Buba Jammeh	Seattle	5
8	Nick Hamer	Spokane	5
8	Junior Garcia	Yakima	5
8	Izzy Deluna	WestSound	5
8	Adam Talley	Spokane	5
