= Bill May (soccer) =

American soccer player (born 1974)

Personal information
- Date of birth: October 2, 1974 (age 52)
- Place of birth: Castro Valley, California, U.S.
- Height: 6 ft 3 in (1.91 m)
- Position: Goalkeeper

College career
Years	Team	Apps	(Gls)
1993–1997	Washington Huskies		

Senior career*
Years	Team	Apps	(Gls)
1994	Santa Cruz Surf		
1996	Spokane Shadow		
1997	Puget Sound BigFoot		
1998	San Francisco Bay Seals	22	(0)
1998	→ San Jose Clash (loan)	0	(0)
1999–2000	Seattle Sounders	26	(0)
1999	→ Los Angeles Galaxy (loan)	0	(0)

Managerial career
- 1999–2004: Washington Huskies (assistant)
- * Club domestic league appearances and goals

Bill May (born October 2, 1974) is an American retired soccer goalkeeper who played professionally in the USL A-League.

== Player ==
=== Youth ===
May graduated from Moreau Catholic High School. He then attended the University of Washington, playing on the men's soccer team from 1993 to 1997. He redshirted his freshman season.

=== Professional ===
In 1994, May played for the Santa Cruz Surf of the USISL during the collegiate off-season. In 1996, he played for the Spokane Shadow and in 1997 with the Puget Sound BigFoot, both also in the USISL. On February 1, 1998, the Tampa Bay Mutiny selected May in the third round (thirty-first overall) of the 1998 MLS College Draft. On March 1, 1998, the Mutiny waived May. He then signed with the San Francisco Seals of the USL A-League. In April 1998, he was called up by the San Jose Clash of Major League Soccer. In 1999, the Seals traded May to the Seattle Sounders in exchange for Ryan Edwards. He gained his first game with the Sounders in August 1999, after Preston Burpo injured his shoulder. He played six games in 1999 and twenty in 2000. He was called up to the Los Angeles Galaxy in October 1999. On February 26, 2001, May announced his retirement from playing.

== Coach ==
May has an extensive youth soccer coaching resume. From 1999 to 2004, he served as an assistant coach with the University of Washington men's soccer team.
