= Ryan Edwards (American soccer) =

American soccer player

Personal information
- Date of birth: January 28, 1976 (age 50)
- Place of birth: Fremont, California, U.S.
- Height: 6 ft 1 in (1.85 m)
- Position: Defender

Youth career
- –1993: Mission San Jose Warriors

College career
Years	Team	Apps	(Gls)
1994–1997	Washington Huskies		

Senior career*
Years	Team	Apps	(Gls)
1996–1997	Spokane Shadow		
1998	Seattle Sounders	3	(0)
1999–2000	San Francisco Bay Seals	40	(5)
2000	→ San Jose Earthquakes (loan)	1	(0)
2001–2005	Seattle Sounders	124	(10)
Total		168	(15)

Managerial career
- 2005–2006: Bellevue Bulldogs (assistant)
- 2006–2008: Saint Mary's Gaels (assistant)
- * Club domestic league appearances and goals

Ryan Edwards (born January 28, 1976) is an American retired soccer defender who played professionally in the USL First Division and Major League Soccer, now gracing the recreational soccer fields of Northern California as a member of North Tam United.

== Player ==
=== Youth ===
Edwards graduated from Mission San Jose High School in Fremont, California, where he led the league in scoring and was named most valuable player by the San Jose Mercury News. The Mission High School men's soccer team won the state championship Edwards' junior and senior seasons. Edwards attended the University of Washington, playing on the men's soccer team from 1994 to 1997. In 1995 and 1997, he also played for the Spokane Shadow during the collegiate off-season.

=== Professional career ===
In April 1998, Edwards turned professional with the Seattle Sounders of the USL A-League. In February 1999, the Sounders traded Edwards to the Bay Area Seals for Bill May. Edwards spent two seasons with the Seals. In August 2000, the Seals sent him on loan to the San Jose Earthquakes for a game against the Los Angeles Galaxy. In November 2000, the Seals withdrew from the league. In 2001, Edwards returned to the Sounders as a free agent. From that point on, he became one of the team's leaders in all-time minutes played and was voted to Team of the Week numerous times. He remained with Seattle until his retirement after the 2005 season. That year, the Sounders won the league title against the Richmond Kickers.

=== Over 40s career ===
In 2017, Edwards joined North Tam United in the Marin Over-40s League.

== Coaching career ==
During his years with the Sounders, Edwards served as an assistant coach with Bellevue Community College. In 2006, Edwards became an assistant coach to the Saint Mary's College of California men's soccer team.

== Personal life ==
Edwards resides in Marin County, California, with his wife, Carly.
