= Evergreen Premier League =

Soccer league in Washington (state)

- Founded: 2013
- First season: 2014
- Country: United States
- Confederation: CONCACAF
- Leagues: EPLWA Men's Premier, EPLWA Championship Division, EPLWA Women's
- Domestic cup: Lamar Hunt U.S. Open Cup National Amateur Cup
- Current champions: Yakima United FC (2nd title) (2025)
- Most championships: Spokane Shadow (3 titles)
- Website: evergreenpremierleaguewa.com

The Evergreen Premier League (EPLWA) is an amateur men's soccer league in the U.S. state of Washington affiliated with the United States Adult Soccer Association. The league was established in 2013 and is contested by ten teams— eight from Western Washington and two from Eastern Washington. The current champions are Bellingham United. The league is headquartered in Bellingham.

== History ==
EPLWA was founded in 2013 and began accepting clubs in August of that year, beginning with Bellingham United transferring from the Pacific Coast Soccer League as the league's founding member. The league adopted its current logo, a silhouetted soccer player over a map of Washington, in September 2013. On May 16, 2014, three weeks into the league's inaugural season, EPLWA was recognized as an "Elite Amateur League" affiliated with the United States Adult Soccer Association.

The inaugural season was won by the Spokane Shadow. The Shadow went on to win the second season with only a single defeat in their 13 matches, finishing with 32 points.

Everett Jets FC was announced as the league's 12th team in 2020.

On November 15th 2025, it was announced that former EPLWA club FC Olympia, who now play in USL 2, will field a reserve team, both men's and women's.

In 2025, the EPLWA debuted the EPLWA Championship Division as a lower-tier competition. The division is a staging ground for teams looking to eventually join the main Premier Division. Later that year, EPLWA introduced the EPLWA Premier Women's, a new elite semi-professional women's league. Teams are still pending. On December 19th, 2025, Port Orchard FC announced that the team was planning on switching leagues from Cascadia Premier League, for the 2026 season. In 2022, Port Orchard FC won the 2nd Division of the Cascadia Premier League, gaining promotion to the top division of the Cascadia Premier League, and they have won numerous CPL championships, gaining recognition, thus making Port Orchard a top contender to join EPLWA.

== Teams ==
Team	City	Stadium	Founded	Joined	Titles
Bellevue Athletic 2	Bellevue	Bellevue College Soccer Field Robinswood Community Park	2022	October 17, 2017	0
Bellingham United FC	Bellingham	Civic Stadium	2011	August 6, 2013	2
Rat City FC	White Center	Steve Cox Memorial Complex	2024	October 17, 2019	0
FC Olympia Reserves	Olympia	Tenino Beaver Stadium	2022	December 7, 2024	0
Skagit Athletic FC	Mount Vernon	Sedro-Woolley High School	2015	2020	0
Vancouver Victory	Vancouver	Harmony Sports Complex	2013	September 4, 2013	1
Washington East Surf	Mead	Union Stadium	2023	March 12, 2024	0
Yakima United FC	Yakima	SOZO Sport Complex	2010	January 21, 2014	1

Locations of the Evergreen Premier League teams

=== Former teams ===
Team	City	Stadium	Founded	Joined	Folded
WestSound FC	Silverdale	Silverdale Stadium (2,500)	2013	August 14, 2013	2015
Everett Jets FC	Everett	Everett Memorial Stadium	2013	2013	2025
Wenatchee FC	Wenatchee	Wenatchee Apple Bowl (3,000)	2013	August 12, 2013	2016
Spokane Shadow	Spokane	Spokane Polo Grounds	1996	August 19, 2013	2025
OlyTown FC Artesians	Olympia	The Pavilion at The Evergreen State College	2014	March 4, 2020	Moved to USL League Two
Tri-Cities Badgers	Richland	Fran Rish Stadium (9,000)	2023	2023	2025

=== Hiatus ===
Team	City	Stadium	Founded	Joined	Start of Hiatus	Titles
Seattle Stars FC	Tukwila	Starfire Sports Complex (4,500) (Note: Beginning in 2015, Seattle Stars FC played some of their home matches at Quil Ceda Stadium in Marysville.)	2011	August 13, 2013		1 (2017)
Tacoma Narrows FC	Tacoma	Silas High School	2018	October 15, 2019	March 4, 2020	0
Tri-Cities Alliance FC	Kennewick	Neil F. Lampson Stadium (6,800)	2017	October 17, 2017	March 11, 2022	0

== Seasons ==
As of April 2025.

Season	Winner	Runner-up	Highest goalscorer		Average attendance	Total attendance
2014	Spokane Shadow (1)	South Sound FC	Tyler Bjork (Bellingham)	13	298	16,695
2015	Spokane Shadow (2)	South Sound FC	Eleazar Galvan (Wenatchee)	11	237	13,372
2016	Vancouver Victory FC (1)	Bellingham United	Tyler Bjork (Seattle)	14	—	—
2017	Seattle Stars FC (1)	Bellingham United	Tyler Bjork (Seattle)	14	—	—
2018	Washington Premier FC (1)	Seattle Stars FC	Brandon Madsen (WPFC)	10	—	—
2019	Washington Premier FC (2)	Bellingham United FC	Tyler Bjork (PacNW)	12	—	—
2020	Season cancelled due to the COVID-19 pandemic					
2021	Bellingham United FC (1)	Pacific Northwest SC	Tyler Bjork (PacNW)	6	—	—
2022	Bellingham United FC (2)	Washington Premier FC	Ale Tomasi (Bellingham)	8	—	—
2023	Spokane Shadow (3)	Yakima United FC				
2024	Yakima United FC (1)	Everett Jets FC	Muhammed Darboe (Everett)	11		
2025	Yakima United FC (2)	Washington East Surf FC	JP Warnell (Vancouver Victory)	10		
