= Tim Steidten =

German association football player

Personal information
- Date of birth: 27 April 1979 (age 47)
- Place of birth: Germany
- Height: 1.85 m (6 ft 1 in)
- Position: Defensive midfielder

Senior career*
Years	Team	Apps	(Gls)
1997–1998	SC Weyhe	0	(0)
1998–2000	Werder Bremen II	0	(0)
2000	Seattle Sounders	10	(0)
2001–2002	FC Oberneuland		
2002–2004	VfB Oldenburg		
2004–2006	SV Meppen	38	(1)
2006–2009	VfL Oldenburg		
- * Club domestic league appearances and goals

Tim Steidten (born 27 April 1979 in Germany) is a German former professional footballer who played as a defensive midfielder.

In July 2023, he was appointed as technical director of West Ham United, having previously worked for Werder Bremen and Bayer Leverkusen, before leaving in January 2025.
