= Seyi Abolaji =

American association football player

Personal information
- Full name: Oluwaseyi Abolaji
- Date of birth: May 6, 1983 (age 43)
- Place of birth: New Bussa, Nigeria
- Height: 1.75 m (5 ft 9 in)
- Positions: Defender; midfielder

Youth career
- Colorado Rush

College career
Years	Team	Apps	(Gls)
2001–2004	Stanford Cardinal		

Senior career*
Years	Team	Apps	(Gls)
2005–2007	California Cougars (indoor)	35	(2)
2006	Seattle Sounders	19	(0)
Total		54	(2)
- * Club domestic league appearances and goals

Oluwaseyi Abolaji (born May 6, 1983) is an American former soccer player. He and his brother, Oluwaseun Abolaji, are the founders of Wilson's Juice Co, a lemonade juice company with a start-up of $10 in 2010 after his return to Nigeria.

== Career ==
Abolaji spent four years of his college career at Stanford University where he made a total of 51 appearances for the Cardinal. He also played professionally for California Cougars in the MISL and for Seattle Sounders in the USL First Division.

He was a system analyst for McMaster-Carr.
