= Dylin Pillay =

South African soccer player (born 1979)

Personal information
- Date of birth: 16 December 1979 (age 46)
- Place of birth: South Africa
- Height: 1.85 m (6 ft 1 in)
- Position: Forward

Senior career*
Years	Team	Apps	(Gls)
- AmaZulu
2001	Seattle Sounders	9	(1)
- Manning Rangers
- Nathi Lions

International career
- South Africa U20
- * Club domestic league appearances and goals

Dylin Pillay (born 16 December 1979) is a South African former soccer player who is last known to have played as an attacker for Nathi Lions.

== Career ==
Before the 2001 season, Pillay signed for American second division side Seattle Sounders after playing for AmaZulu in the South African Premier Division, before joining South African second division club Nathi Lions.

At the age of 29, he retired due to an injury.
