= Ben Dragavon =

American soccer player

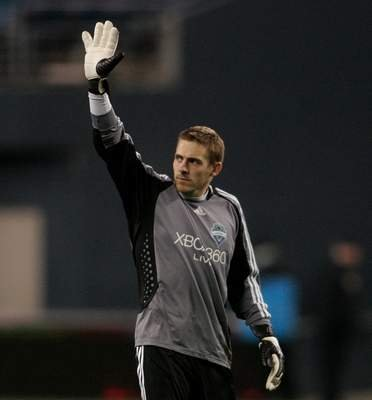

Personal information
- Full name: Benjamin Dragavon
- Date of birth: December 31, 1983 (age 42)
- Place of birth: Monroe, Washington, U.S.
- Height: 6 ft 1 in (1.85 m)
- Position: Goalkeeper

College career
Years	Team	Apps	(Gls)
2002–2005	Western Washington Vikings	76	(0)

Senior career*
Years	Team	Apps	(Gls)
2006–2008	Seattle Sounders	5	(0)
2007–2008	Seattle Wolves (indoor)		
2009	MLS Pool	–	(–)
2009	→ Seattle Sounders FC (loan)	1	(0)
2009	→ Toronto FC (loan)	0	(0)
2011	Tacoma Stars (indoor)	2	(0)
2013	Seattle Sounders FC U-23	1	(0)

Managerial career
- 2010–2011: Seattle Redhawks (assistant)
- 2012: Western Washington Vikings (assistant)
- 2012–2013: Seattle Sounders FC U-23 (assistant)
- 2013–2017: Seattle Reign FC (goalkeeper)
- * Club domestic league appearances and goals

Ben Dragavon (born December 31, 1983) is an American former soccer player who is currently an assistant coach for Seattle Reign FC in the National Women's Soccer League.

== Personal life ==
Dragavon is married to Alex Thomason.
(m. 2020)

== Career ==
=== Youth and college ===
Dragavon graduated from Monroe High School in 2002. In 2001, he backstopped the Bearcats to the Washington State 3A High School Championship. He then attended Western Washington University, playing on the men's soccer team from 2002 to 2005. He finished his career at WWU with the team's all-time record in shutouts. He is also third on the school's list with a 1.38 GAA.

=== Professional ===
On July 20, 2006, the Seattle Sounders signed him as a back-up to Chris Eylander when the Seattle's backup goalkeeper James Ward was injured. He played no games that season, but saw time in four games in 2007. On July 16, 2007, the Milwaukee Wave of Major Indoor Soccer League picked Dragavon in the seventh round of the 2007 MISL Supplemental Draft. However, he did not sign with the Wave. During the winter of 2007–2008, he played indoor soccer with the Seattle Wolves FC of the Premier Arena Soccer League.

Dragavon signed a contract in early 2009 to become part of the Major League Soccer League-Wide Reserve Goalkeeper Pool. During the early part of 2009 he was called up by Seattle Sounders FC to provide cover for Kasey Keller while regular reserve keeper Chris Eylander was out injured. He made his MLS debut for Seattle on April 11, 2009, in a game against the Kansas City Wizards, when Keller was sent off for handling outside the penalty area. He was on the bench for Toronto FC during their 5–0 loss to New York Red Bulls on October 25, 2009.

In early March 2010, Dragavon pre-signed a two-year contract with the Aztex, against whom he made his USL debut in 2009, but he was released before the season started after failing his medical.

=== Coaching ===
In 2012, Dragavon became the goalkeeper coach for the USL PDL club Seattle Sounders FC U-23. He made an appearance as goalkeeper for the Sounders U-23 team versus Washington Crossfire on May 31, 2013.

In 2013, he became the goalkeeper coach for Seattle Reign FC of the National Women's Soccer League. He became a full-time assistant coach in 2017.

== Honors ==
Seattle Sounders

- USL First Division Championship: 2007
- USL First Division Commissioner's Cup: 2007
