= Chris Eylander =

American soccer player

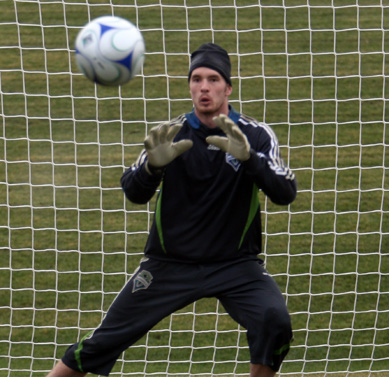

Personal information
- Full name: Christopher Mark Eylander
- Date of birth: March 14, 1984 (age 42)
- Place of birth: Sumner, Washington, U.S.
- Height: 6 ft 1 in (1.85 m)
- Position: Goalkeeper

College career
Years	Team	Apps	(Gls)
2002–2005	Washington Huskies	49	(0)

Senior career*
Years	Team	Apps	(Gls)
2002	Seattle Sounders Select	1	(0)
2004	Spokane Shadow	8	(0)
2005	Yakima Reds	10	(0)
2006–2008	Seattle Sounders	78	(0)
2009	Seattle Sounders FC	1	(0)
- * Club domestic league appearances and goals as of 22 March 2010

Chris Eylander (born March 14, 1984) is an American former soccer player.

== Career ==
=== Youth and college ===
Eylander had an outstanding youth career. He won the 1998, 1999 and 2000 Washington State youth soccer championship with his club team, Federal Way United Storm '83. He attended Auburn Riverside High School where he was the 2002 Washington State Player of the Year. He then attended the University of Washington, playing on the men's soccer team from 2002 to 2005. During his college career, Eylander would spend each summer with a Premier Development League team. In 2002 and 2003, he played with the Seattle Sounders Select, in 2004 with the Spokane Shadow and in 2005 with the Yakima Reds.

=== Professional ===
In 2006, the Seattle Sounders of the USL First Division selected Eylander with their pick in the USL First Division College Draft. He played 23 games his first season with the Sounders and twenty-seven in 2007 as Seattle took the USL-1 championship. Eylander led the USL First Division in saves during the 2007 and 2008 seasons as he recorded 29 clean sheets in three seasons with the Sounders. After much speculation, he eventually made the move 'up' to MLS expansion team Seattle Sounders FC, signing with them on January 6, 2009. He made his first start on April 18, 2009, after starter Kasey Keller was forced to sit out a game for a red card. He also played in a 4-1 U.S. Open Cup play-in victory over Real Salt Lake on April 28, 2009. Eylander was waived by the Sounders on March 22, 2010.
