= Spokane Shadow =

- Full name: Spokane Soccer Club Shadow
- Founded: 1996; 30 years ago
- Stadium: Joe Albi Stadium (1996–2005); Spokane Falls Community College Stadium (2014 – present)
- Capacity: 4,000
- Manager: Mike Pellicio
- League: Evergreen Premier League; National Premier Soccer League
- 2018: 1st
Home colours	Away colours

Spokane Shadow is an American soccer team, founded in 1996. The team competed in the National Premier Soccer League as well as the Evergreen Premier League, one of United States Adult Soccer Association's elite amateur leagues. From 1996 to 2005, the team played in the United Soccer Leagues' Premier Development League (PDL), the fourth tier of the American Soccer Pyramid. The men's team folded when the franchise was terminated in 2006 by the PDL after the 10-year-old artificial turf at their home ground, Joe Albi Stadium in Spokane, Washington was declared unsafe for play.

Spokane's place in the Western Conference Northwest Division of the PDL was taken by Tacoma F.C. The team was revived as Spokane Shadow Club Shadow in 2014 as a member of the Evergreen Premier League (EPLWA) and play at Spokane Falls Community College. Beginning with the 2017 season, SSC Shadow also fielded a team in NPSL.

== Year-by-year ==
Year	Division	League	Regular season	Playoffs	Open Cup
1996	4	USISL Premier	1st, Western Northern	Division Finals	did not qualify
1997	4	USISL PDSL	1st, Northwest	Quarterfinals	did not qualify
1998	4	USISL PDSL	1st, Northwest	Division Semifinals	did not qualify
1999	4	USL PDL	2nd, Northwest	Runner-up	2nd Round
2000	4	USL PDL	2nd, Northwest	Conference Semifinals	did not qualify
2001	4	USL PDL	3rd, Northwest	did not qualify	did not qualify
2002	4	USL PDL	2nd, Northwest	Conference Semifinals	did not qualify
2003	4	USL PDL	1st, Northwest	Conference Semifinals	did not qualify
2004	4	USL PDL	2nd, Northwest	Conference Semifinals	1st Round
2005	4	USL PDL	2nd, Northwest	did not qualify	did not qualify
2014	5	EPLWA	1st	N/A	did not qualify
2015	5	EPLWA	1st	N/A	did not qualify
2016	5	EPLWA	3rd	N/A	did not qualify
2017	4	NPSL	4th, Northwest	N/A	did not qualify
2018	4	NPSL	1st, Northwest	1st Round	did not qualify
2019	4	NPSL	3rd, Northwest	did not qualify	did not qualify

== Honors ==
- NPSL Northwest Conference Champions 2018
- EPLWA Champions 2014, 2015, 2023
- USL PDL Northwest Division Champions 2003
- USL PDL Western Conference Champions 1999
- USISL PDSL Northwest Division Champions 1997, 1998
- USISL Premier League Western-Northern Division Champions 1996

== Coaches ==
- (Iceland) Einar Thorarinsson (1995–1996)
- (United States) Sean Bushey (1997–1999)
- (United States) Stuart Saunders (2004–2005)
- (United States) Chad Brown (2014–2016)
- (United States) Cameron Bushey (2017–2018)
- (United States) Mike Pellicio (2018–2021)
- (United States) Jay Vela (2022–2022)
- (United States) Mike Pellicio (2022–present)

== Stadia ==
- Joe Albi Stadium, Spokane, Washington 1996–05
- Spokane Falls Community College, Spokane, Washington 2014–present
- Spokane Polo Club

== Attendances ==
Attendance stats are calculated by averaging each team's self-reported home attendances from Kenn.com https://kenn.com/blog/soccer/all-time-usl-league-two-attendance/

- 1996: 1,311 (2nd in PDL) Playoffs: 1,560 Overall : 1,344
- 1997: 1,358 (2nd in PDL) Playoffs: 1,614 Overall : 1,417
- 1998: 2,179 (1st in PDL)
- 1999: 1,967 (1st in PDL) Playoffs: 3,836 Overall : 2,234
- 2000: 1,452 (2nd in PDL) Playoffs: 1,005 Overall : 1,407
- 2001: 1,336 (4th in PDL)
- 2002: 1,330 (4th in PDL) Playoffs: 1,276 Overall : 1,325
- 2003: 1,027 (4th in PDL) Playoffs: 982 Overall : 1,023
- 2004: 999 (4th in PDL)
- 2005: 954 (5th in PDL)

== See also ==
- Spokane Spiders
