= List of San Jose Earthquakes players =

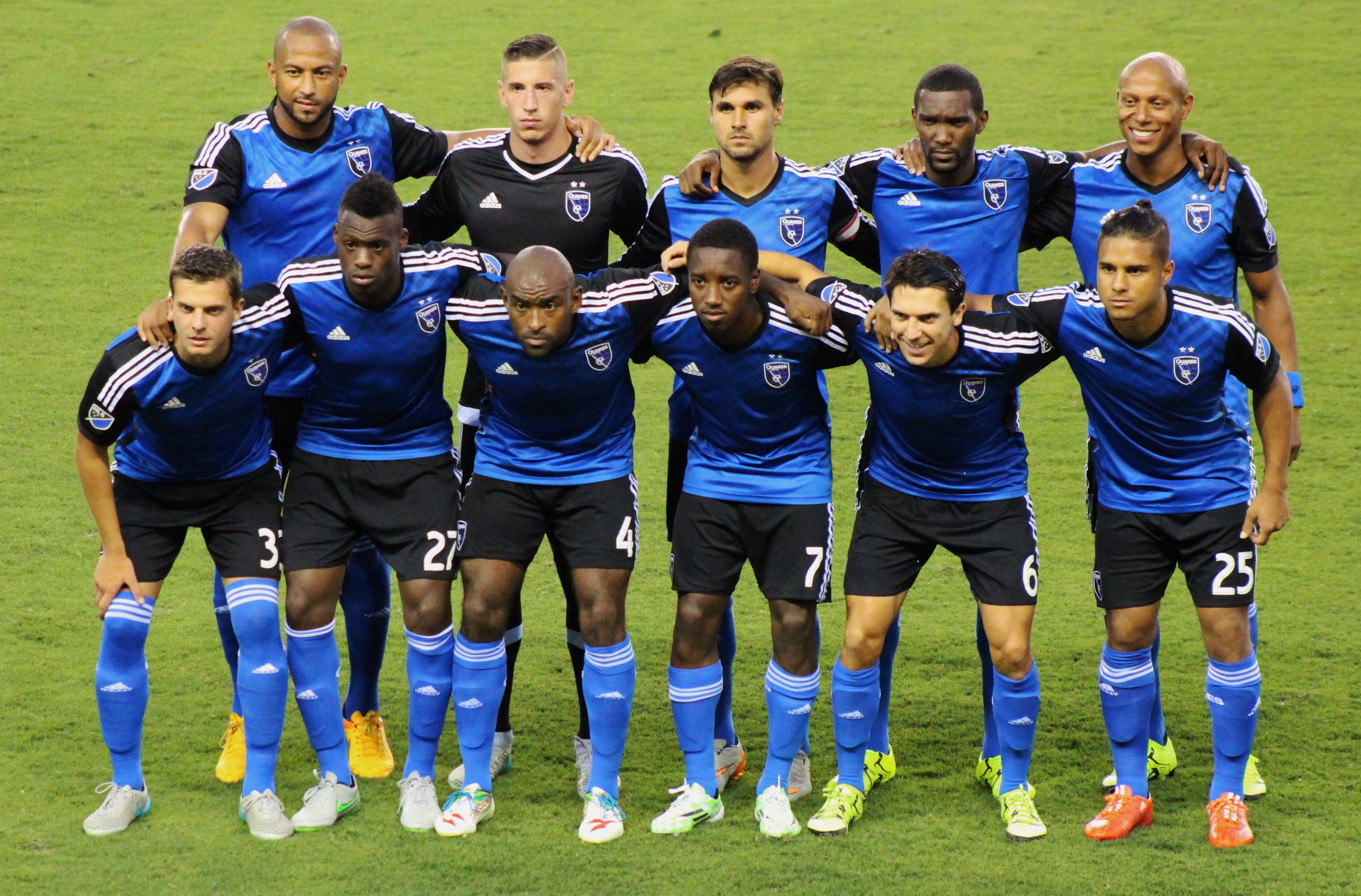
The San Jose Earthquakes on the field before a match against the Houston Dynamo in 2015

The San Jose Earthquakes are an American soccer club founded in 1994 as the San Jose Clash after the city of San Jose was awarded an inaugural Major League Soccer (MLS) franchise. San Jose began playing competitive soccer in the 1996 season. It plays its home games at Avaya Stadium, competing in the Western Conference of the MLS. The current San Jose Earthquakes is the second soccer team from San Jose to bear the Earthquakes nickname. The tradition was started by San Jose's North American Soccer League team in 1974 who carried the name until the team folded in 1988. The current San Jose Earthquakes is an entity distinct of this club, and hosted the first ever MLS game on April 6, 1996, against D.C. United. In 2005, the then owner of the Earthquakes, Anschutz Entertainment Group, announced plans of the team relocating to Houston due to failing efforts to secure a soccer-specific stadium in San Jose. The organization in Houston would be considered an expansion team by the league, eventually being known as the Houston Dynamo, who began play in 2006. The Earthquakes returned after a two-year hiatus, resuming play in 2008.

As of January 18, 2017, a total of 210 players have participated in at least one league match for the San Jose Earthquakes. Chris Wondolowski is the MLS all-time top scorer with 171 goals as well as the San Jose Earthquakes club all-time top scorer with 171 goals. Shea Salinas has the most assists for the club with 50. A total of 106 Earthquakes players have represented their country at full international level. Landon Donovan has made the most international appearances (157 for the United States), and scored the most goals (57).

== Players ==
Major League Soccer clubs are allowed a roster of 28 players at any one time during the MLS season. Players who were contracted to the club but never played an MLS game are not listed.

DF = Defender

MF = Midfielder

FW = Forward/striker

Int. caps = International appearances

Int. goals = International goals

=== Outfield players ===
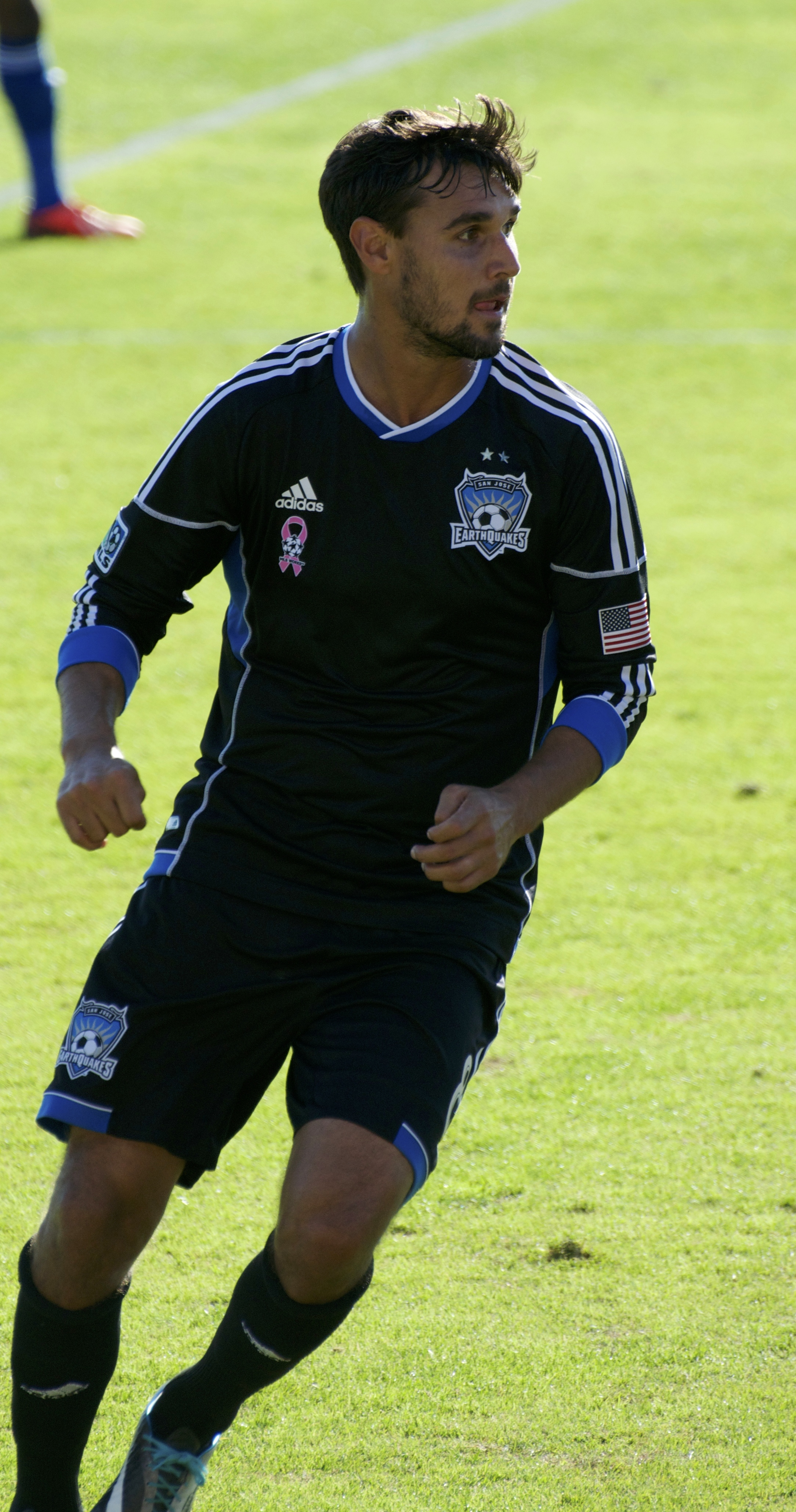
Chris Wondolowski is the Earthquakes' all-time leader in goals.

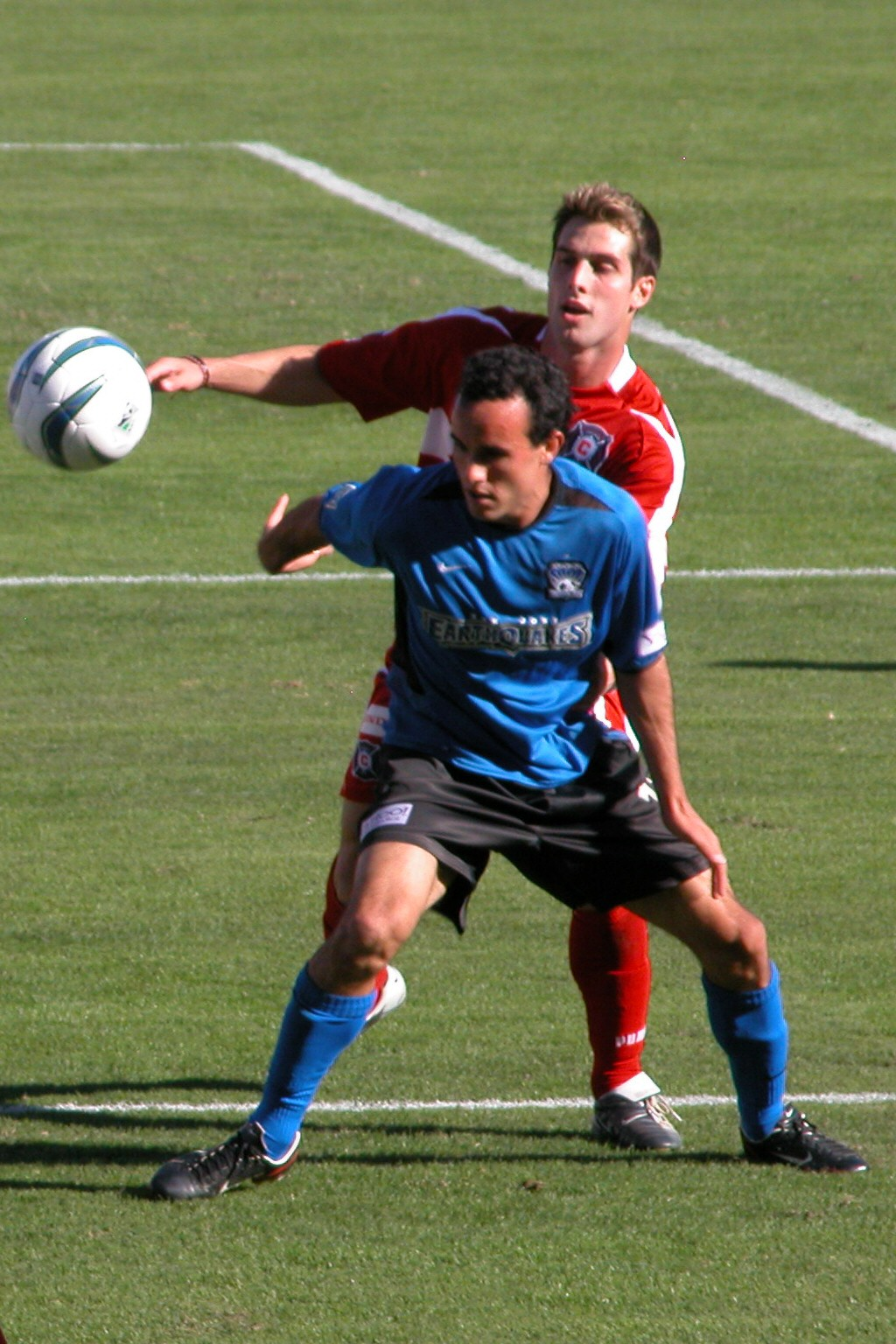
Landon Donovan is the Earthquakes' third all-time leader in goals.

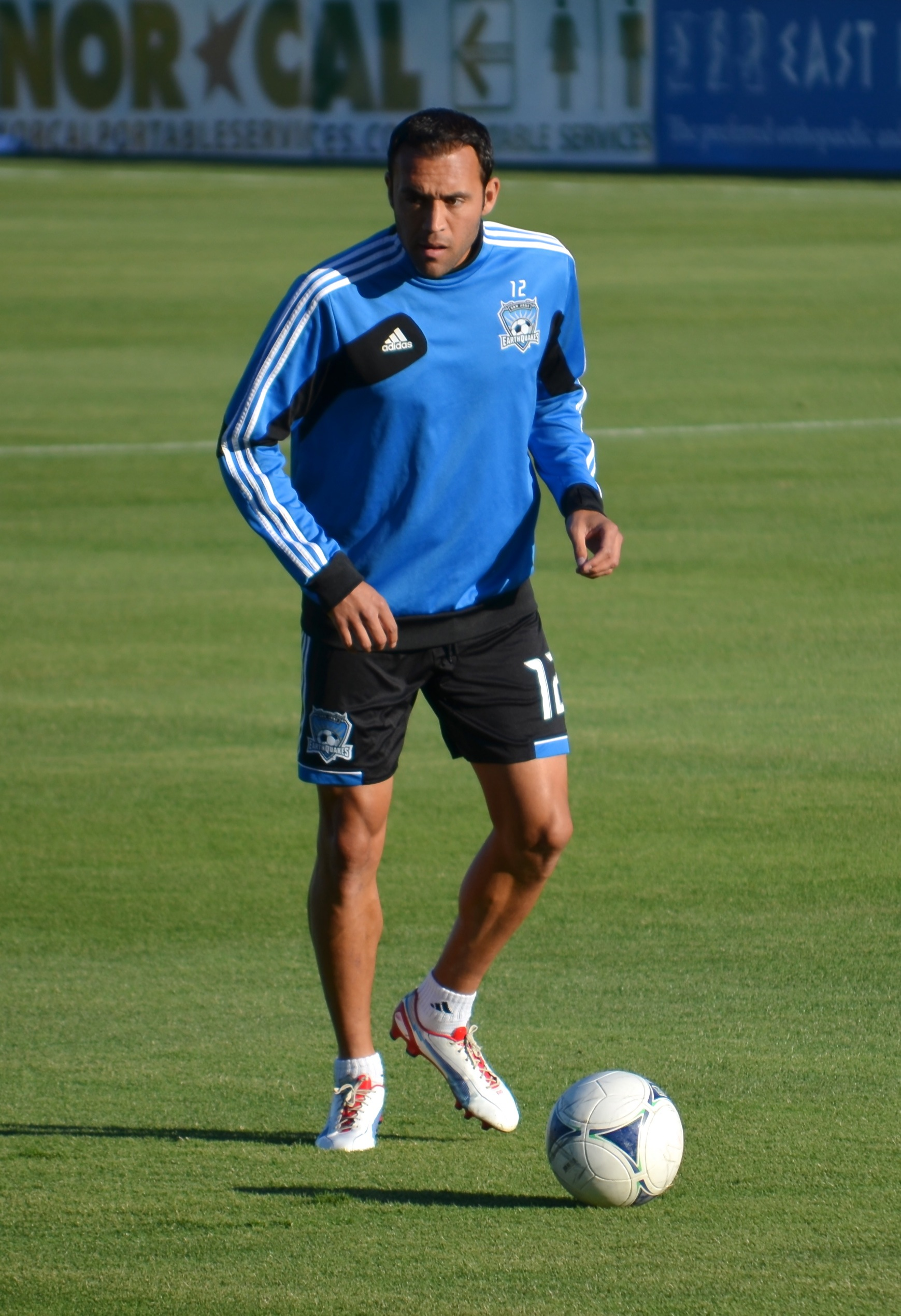
Ramiro Corrales has made the most appearances for the Earthquakes with 250.

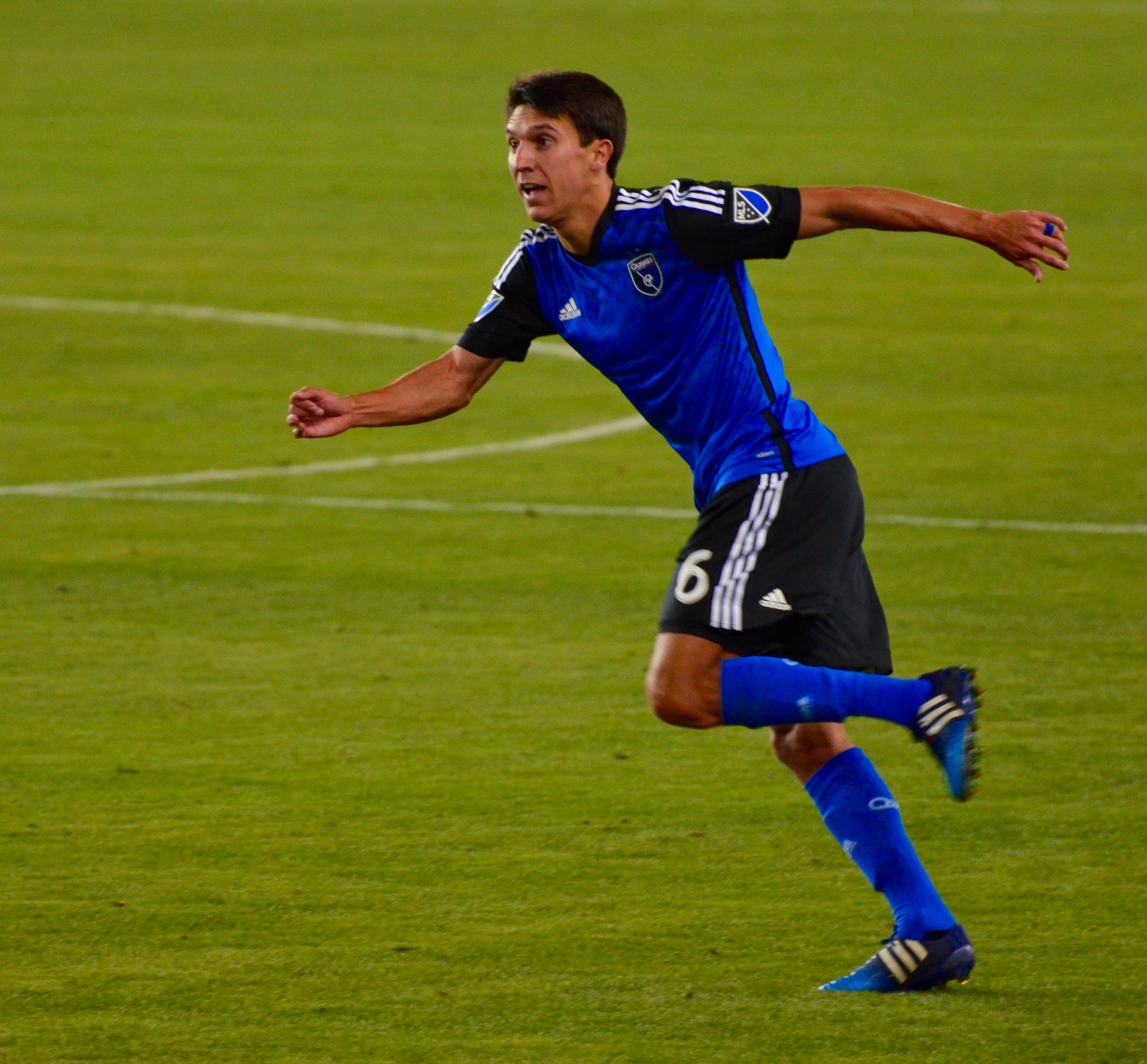
Shea Salinas is third in all time appearances for the Earthquakes.

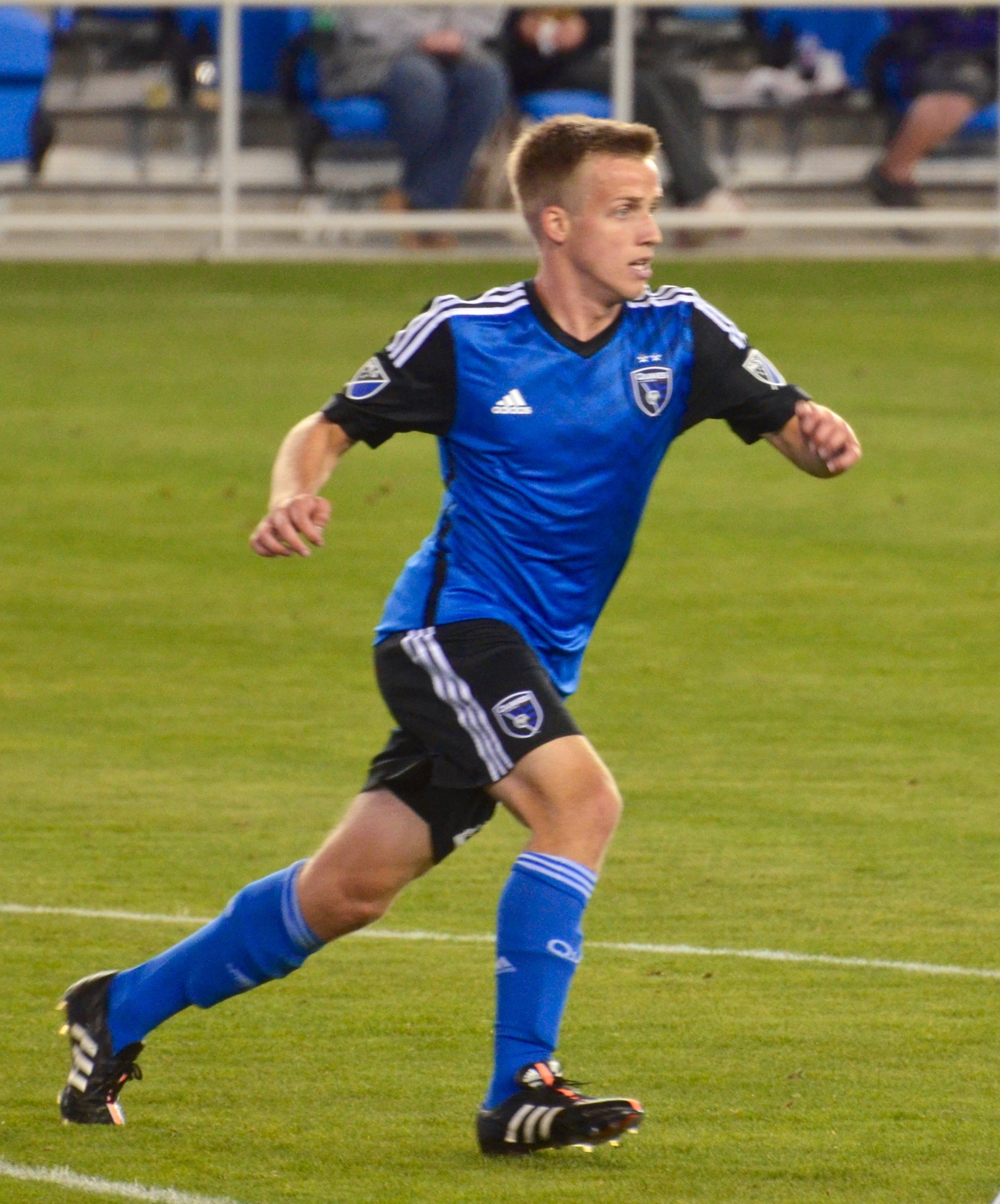
Tommy Thompson was the Earthquakes' first Homegrown Player

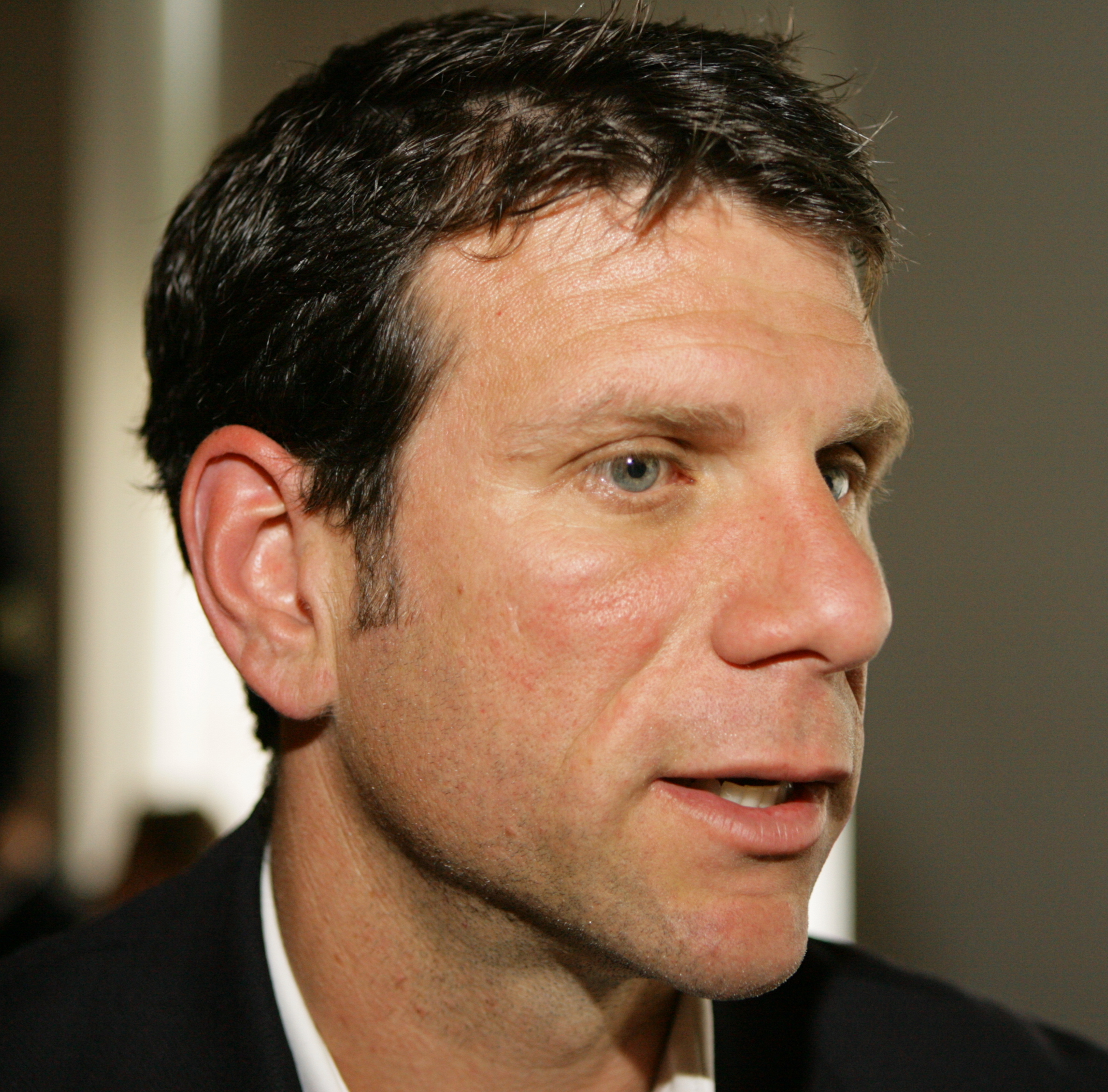
Former Earthquake Jeff Agoos had 134 caps for the United States.

All statistics are for the MLS regular season games only, and are correct as of November 30, 2017.

Name	Position	Country	Years	Games	Goals	Assists	Int. caps	Int. goals	Notes
François Affolter	DF	Switzerland	2017–2020	16	0	0	5	0	
Junior Agogo	FW	Ghana	2001	14	4	3	27	12	
Jeff Agoos	DF	USA	2001–2004	98	6	8	134	4	
Jaime Alas	MF	El Salvador	2013	8	0	0	58	6	
Fatai Alashe	MF	USA	2015–2019	63	4	3	0	0	
Jean Alexandre	MF	Haiti	2012	2	0	0	28	2	
Chris Aloisi	DF	USA	2004–2005	6	0	0	0	0	
Arturo Álvarez	FW	El Salvador	2003–2004; 2008–2010	80	13	7	43	4	
Quincy Amarikwa	FW	USA	2009–2010; 2015–2018	72	10	9	0	0	
Rafael Amaya	DF	Colombia	1996	7	0	0	0	0	
Anthony Ampaipitakwong	MF	Thailand	2011–2012	12	0	2	2	0	
Nana Attakora	DF	Canada	2011; 2013	14	0	1	8	0	
Khodadad Azizi	FW	Iran	2000	20	3	4	47	11	
Rafael Baca	MF	Mexico	2011–2013	79	2	9	0	0	
Jeff Baicher	FW	USA	1996–1999	102	20	15	2	0	
Medhi Ballouchy	MF	Morocco	2012–2013	11	0	0	0	0	
Devin Barclay	FW	USA	2002	12	0	0	0	0	
Brandon Barklage	DF	USA	2014–2015	13	0	0	0	0	
Leandro Barrera	FW	Argentina	2015–2017	6	0	0	0	0	
Chad Barrett	FW	USA	2016	20	2	1	1	0	
Wade Barrett	DF	USA	1998–2002; 2005	142	6	24	2	0	
Steven Beitashour	DF	Iran	2010–2013	87	2	16	6	0	
Víctor Bernárdez	DF	Honduras	2012–2017	152	6	5	78	4	
Scott Bower	MF	USA	1999–2002	41	0	6	0	0	
Paul Bravo	MF	USA	1996	31	13	5	4	1	
Dario Brose	MF	USA	1999–2001	56	9	6	0	0	
Chris Brown	MF	USA	2004	11	2	1	0	0	
Bobby Burling	DF	USA	2009–2011	48	1	2	0	0	
Mike Burns	DF	USA	2000	18	0	2	75	0	
Altimont Butler	MF	Jamaica	1996	14	2	0	69	12	
Dan Calichman	DF	USA	2000	16	0	1	2	0	
Danny Califf	DF	USA	2005	20	2	0	23	1	
Pablo Campos	FW	Brazil	2009	14	2	2	0	0	
Chris Carrieri	MF	USA	2001	5	0	0	0	0	
Cordell Cato	MF	Trinidad and Tobago	2013–2017	98	7	9	15	1	
Darwin Cerén	MF	El Salvador	2016–2017	33	0	1	41	2	
Ronald Cerritos	FW	El Salvador	1997–2001; 2005	148	61	47	70	8	
Marvin Chávez	MF	Honduras	2012–2013	42	4	14	48	4	
Brian Ching	FW	USA	2003–2005	56	25	11	45	11	
Mark Chung	MF	USA	2005	26	6	7	24	2	
Jamie Clark	DF	Scotland	1999–2001	34	2	2	0	0	
Ricardo Clark	MF	USA	2005	30	3	2	34	3	
Braeden Cloutier	FW	USA	1998–1999	56	4	9	0	0	
Ryan Cochrane	DF	USA	2004–2005; 2008–2009	53	2	2	0	0	
Kip Colvey	DF	New Zealand	2016–2017	4	0	1	15	0	
Jimmy Conrad	DF	USA	1999–2002	84	2	6	27	1	
Abdul Thompson Conteh	FW	Sierra Leone	2000	30	15	3	17	0	
Bobby Convey	MF	USA	2009–2011	75	3	14	46	1	
Ramiro Corrales	DF	USA	1996–1997; 2001–2004; 2008–2013	250	16	32	6	0	
Sam Cronin	MF	USA	2010–2014	140	5	12	2	0	
Arnold Cruz	DF	Honduras	1998	20	0	2	50	3	
Harold Cummings	DF	Panama	2017–2019	0	0	0	46	0	
John Cunliffe	FW	England	2008	12	2	0	0	0	
Brad Davis	MF	USA	2005	18	2	8	17	0	
Simon Dawkins	MF	Jamaica	2011–2012; 2016–2018	96	19	5	19	3	
Troy Dayak	DF	USA	1996–1998; 2001–2005	129	9	7	9	0	
Dwayne De Rosario	MF	Canada	2001–2005	108	27	31	81	22	
Eric Denton	DF	USA	2008–2009	37	0	3	0	0	
Raúl Díaz Arce	FW	El Salvador	1999	18	4	2	68	39	
César Díaz Pizarro	FW	Peru	2012–2013	1	0	0	0	0	
Yannick Djaló	FW	Portugal	2014	18	3	2	1	0	
Tighe Dombrowski	DF	USA	2004–2005	4	0	0	0	0	
Landon Donovan	FW	USA	2001–2004	87	32	29	157	57	
John Doyle	DF	USA	1996–2000	135	11	15	53	3	
Oscar Draguicevich	DF	USA	1996–1998	45	4	2	0	0	
Todd Dunivant	DF	USA	2003–2004	46	1	6	2	0	
Gabe Eastman	DF	USA	2000	2	0	0	0	0	
Eduardo	MF	Brazil	2010	8	0	1	0	0	
Ryan Edwards	DF	USA	2000	1	0	0	0	0	
Ronnie Ekelund	MF	Denmark	2001–2004	91	11	16	0	0	
Simon Elliott	MF	New Zealand	2009	15	0	0	69	6	
Innocent Emeghara	FW	Switzerland	2015–2017	13	1	0	9	0	
Michael Emenalo	DF	Nigeria	1996–1997	56	1	4	14	0	
Eduardo Espinoza	MF	Mexico	1996	26	10	5	41	4	
Justin Evans	MF	USA	2000	13	0	0	0	0	
Rodrigo Faria	FW	Brazil	2003	4	0	1	0	0	
Carlos Farias	MF	Chile	1999	2	0	0	0	0	
Vicente Figueroa	MF	Mexico	1998	20	0	0	0	0	
Shaun Francis	DF	Jamaica	2014–2017	69	0	1	11	3	
Adam Frye	DF	USA	1999	3	0	1	0	0	
Mike Fucito	FW	USA	2013–2015	17	0	0	0	0	
Nick Garcia	DF	USA	2008–2009	36	0	2	6	0	
Dan Gargan	DF	USA	2013	8	0	1	0	0	
Sam Garza	FW	USA	2012–2014	12	4	1	0	0	
Geovanni	MF	Brazil	2010	12	1	3	1	0	
Joey Gjertsen	MF	USA	2010–2012	36	2	4	0	0	
Cornell Glen	FW	Trinidad and Tobago	2009–2010	33	5	1	69	23	
Gavin Glinton	FW	Turks and Caicos Islands	2008	6	0	0	10	4	
Aníbal Godoy	MF	Panama	2015–2019	59	5	2	55	1	
Henok Goitom	FW	Eritrea	2016	8	0	0	2	1	
Kevin Goldthwaite	DF	USA	2005	3	0	1	0	0	
Luchi Gonzalez	FW	USA	2002	8	0	0	0	0	
Clarence Goodson	DF	USA	2013–2016	49	2	3	46	5	
Alan Gordon	FW	USA	2011–2014	64	18	10	2	0	
Andreas Görlitz	DF	Germany	2014	3	0	0	2	0	
Richard Gough	DF	Scotland	1998–1999	19	2	1	61	6	
Ned Grabavoy	MF	USA	2008	24	0	4	0	0	
Kelly Gray	MF	USA	2005; 2008–2009	43	1	2	0	0	
Ariel Graziani	FW	Ecuador	2002	28	14	5	34	15	
Maxwell Griffin	FW	USA	2011	4	0	0	0	0	
Iván Guerrero	DF	Honduras	2008	14	1	0	84	4	
Henry Gutierrez	MF	USA	1996	7	1	1	1	0	
Sercan Güvenışık	FW	Turkey	2012	5	0	0	0	0	
Daniel Guzman	FW	Mexico	1997	3	0	1	20	6	
Ty Harden	DF	USA	2013–2015	26	1	1	0	0	
Atiba Harris	MF	Saint Kitts and Nevis	2014	24	4	2	60	14	
Wes Hart	DF	USA	2004–2005	25	0	0	0	0	
Ryshiem Henderson	FW	USA	1996	3	0	0	0	0	
Jason Hernandez	DF	Puerto Rico	2008–2014	165	0	3	3	0	
Danny Hoesen	FW	Netherlands	2017	32	5	5	0	0	
Paul Holocher	MF	USA	1996	4	1	0	1	0	
Darren Huckerby	MF	England	2008–2009	28	9	6	0	0	
Jahmir Hyka	MF	Albania	2017–2018	30	3	5	46	2	
Tayt Ianni	DF	USA	1996–1997	7	0	0	0	0	
Zak Ibsen	DF	USA	2001–2002	41	2	4	15	0	
Andres Imperiale	DF	Argentina	2016–2017	24	0	0	0	0	
Ben Iroha	MF	Nigeria	1996–1997	33	2	8	50	1	
Adam Jahn	FW	USA	2013–2016	62	6	1	0	0	
Jair	FW	Cape Verde	1999	3	1	1	2	0	
Omar Jasseh	MF	Gambia	2010–2011	5	0	1	0	0	
Ryan Johnson	FW	Jamaica	2008–2011	99	17	13	36	8	
Florian Jungwirth	DF	Germany	2017–	30	2	3	0	0	
Kei Kamara	FW	Sierra Leone	2008	12	2	1	25	5	
Harut Karapetyan	FW	Armenia	1998	5	0	0	1	0	
Dominic Kinnear	DF	USA	1997	28	2	4	54	9	
Jovan Kirovski	FW	USA	2008	9	0	0	62	9	
J. J. Koval	MF	USA	2014–2015	37	0	0	0	0	
Wojtek Krakowiak	MF	Poland	2000–2001	25	5	0	0	0	
Manny Lagos	MF	USA	2001–2003	79	14	17	3	0	
Chris Leitch	DF	USA	2009–2011	58	0	8	0	0	
Steven Lenhart	FW	USA	2011–2016	72	20	8	0	0	
Roger Levesque	FW	USA	2003–2005	4	0	0	0	0	
Eddie Lewis	MF	USA	1996–1999	115	9	35	82	10	
Francisco Lima	MF	Brazil	2008	14	0	2	0	0	
Nick Lima	DF	USA	2017–	22	2	1	0	0	
Lawrence Lozzano	MF	USA	1997–1998	41	14	11	7	0	
André Luiz	MF	Brazil	2009–2011	16	0	1	19	2	
Matt Luzunaris	FW	USA	2011	6	0	0	0	0	
Tim Martin	DF	USA	1996–1998	83	1	3	2	0	
Joey Martinez	DF	USA	1999	15	0	1	0	0	
Walter Martínez	MF	USA	2013	15	2	2	49	12	
Brandon McDonald	DF	Guam	2009–2011	58	3	3	9	1	
Ellis McLoughlin	FW	USA	2011–2012	10	1	0	0	0	
Shawn Medved	FW	USA	1997–1998	50	4	7	0	0	
Victor Mella	FW	Chile	1998	31	4	8	0	0	
Lindo Mfeka	MF	South Africa	2017	1	0	0	0	0	
Alejandro Moreno	FW	Venezuela	2005	31	8	4	41	3	
Tressor Moreno	MF	Colombia	2012	12	0	3	32	7	
Justin Morrow	DF	USA	2010–2013	71	2	6	1	0	
Brian Mullan	MF	USA	2003–2005	83	12	23	4	0	
Travis Mulraine	MF	Trinidad and Tobago	2000	15	0	1	21	0	
Richard Mulrooney	MF	USA	1999–2004	173	4	44	14	0	
Julian Nash	FW	USA	2005	10	1	1	0	0	
Sanna Nyassi	MF	Gambia	2015	28	2	2	9	1	
Leighton O'Brien	MF	USA	1999; 2002	4	0	0	0	0	
Ronnie O'Brien	MF	Ireland	2008	28	4	6	0	0	
Curt Onalfo	DF	USA	1997	6	0	0	1	0	
Ike Opara	DF	USA	2010–2012	35	3	0	0	0	
Danny O'Rourke	DF	USA	2005	13	0	0	0	0	
Marc Pelosi	MF	USA	2015–2017	12	0	0	0	0	
Matías Pérez García	MF	USA	2014–2016	47	3	9	0	0	
Jacob Peterson	FW	USA	2011	9	0	2	0	0	
Peguero Jean Philippe	FW	Haiti	2008	3	0	0	26	21	
Jean-Baptiste Pierazzi	MF	Corsica	2014–2015	27	1	0	4	0	
Pablo Pintos	DF	Uruguay	2014	6	0	0	0	0	
Aaron Pitchkolan	DF	USA	2009	9	0	0	0	0	
Caleb Porter	MF	USA	1998–1999	4	0	0	0	0	
Valeri Qazaishvili	MF	Georgia	2017–2020	13	5	2	31	6	
Alberto Quintero	MF	Panama	2016	30	3	4	75	4	
Paulo Renato	DF	Portugal	2015	5	0	0	0	0	
António Ribeiro	MF	Canada	2009	7	0	0	3	0	
James Riley	DF	USA	2008	24	0	2	0	0	
Brad Ring	MF	USA	2010–2013	37	0	1	0	0	
Jamil Roberts	DF	USA	2008–2009	1	0	0	0	0	
Eddie Robinson	DF	USA	2001–2005	70	4	3	1	1	
Javier Robles	MF	Argentina	2010	2	0	0	0	0	
Jorge Rodas	MF	Guatemala	1996	29	1	3	38	4	
Esmundo Rodriguez	FW	USA	1997–2000	10	0	0	0	0	
Chris Roner	DF	USA	2002–2004	27	2	2	0	0	
Ian Russell	MF	USA	2000–2005	131	5	20	0	0	
Shea Salinas	MF	USA	2008–2009; 2012–	216	9	41	0	0	
Ramón Sánchez	MF	El Salvador	2009–2010	13	2	1	74	2	
Kofi Sarkodie	DF	USA	2016–2017	31	0	1	0	0	
Giovanni Savarese	FW	Venezuela	2000	4	0	1	30	10	
Billy Schuler	FW	USA	2014	6	0	0	0	0	
Scott Sealy	FW	Trinidad and Tobago	2008; 2010–2011	40	3	4	25	2	
Brian Sebapole	FW	South Africa	1998	12	0	3	0	0	
Alejandro Sequeira	FW	Costa Rica	1999	14	3	2	2	0	
Mark Sherrod	FW	USA	2015–2016	6	0	0	0	0	
Matheus Silva	DF	Brazil	2015–2017	4	0	0	0	0	
Adam Smarte	FW	Liberia	2008	3	0	0	0	0	
Mauricio Solís	MF	Costa Rica	1999–2000	30	4	1	110	6	
Davide Somma	FW	South Africa	2008–2009	4	0	0	3	1	
Khari Stephenson	MF	Jamaica	2010–2012; 2014–2015	92	10	10	32	3	
Jordan Stewart	DF	England	2013–2016	71	0	3	0	0	
Christopher Sullivan	MF	USA	1997	24	2	6	19	2	
Ryan Tinsley	MF	USA	1999–2000	35	1	1	0	0	
Tommy Thompson	FW	USA	2014–	79	1	4	0	0	
Marcus Tracy	FW	USA	2012–2013	5	0	0	0	0	
István Urbányi	MF	Hungary	1997–1998	23	1	3	2	0	
Marco Ureña	FW	Costa Rica	2017	25	5	1	25	5	
Francisco Uribe	FW	Mexico	1998	12	2	5	19	9	
Martin Vasquez	MF	USA	1998	28	0	7	7	0	
Joe Vide	MF	USA	2008	5	0	0	0	0	
Maxi Viera	MF	USA	1999	5	0	0	0	0	
Craig Waibel	DF	USA	2003–2005	53	1	4	0	0	
Jamil Walker	MF	USA	2003–2004	29	4	0	0	0	
Tim Ward	DF	USA	2010–2012	16	0	1	0	0	
Cam Weaver	FW	USA	2009	9	1	2	0	0	
Tim Weaver	DF	USA	1998–1999	13	0	0	0	0	
Chris Wondolowski	FW	USA	2005; 2009–	254	130	32	35	11	
Mauricio Wright	DF	Costa Rica	1999–2000	36	3	2	67	6	
Eric Wynalda	FW	USA	1996–1999	57	21	29	106	34	
Marvell Wynne	DF	USA	2015–2017	65	0	3	5	0	
Jackson Yueill	MF	USA	2017–	24	0	1	0	0	
Mike Zaher	DF	USA	2009	10	0	2	0	0	
Jed Zayner	DF	USA	2012	1	0	0	0	0	
Zico	FW	Brazil	1997	7	1	1	0	0	
Edmundo Zura	FW	Ecuador	2011	1	0	0	11	1	
Amahl Pellegrino	FW	Norway	2024–	45	8	4			

=== Goalkeepers ===
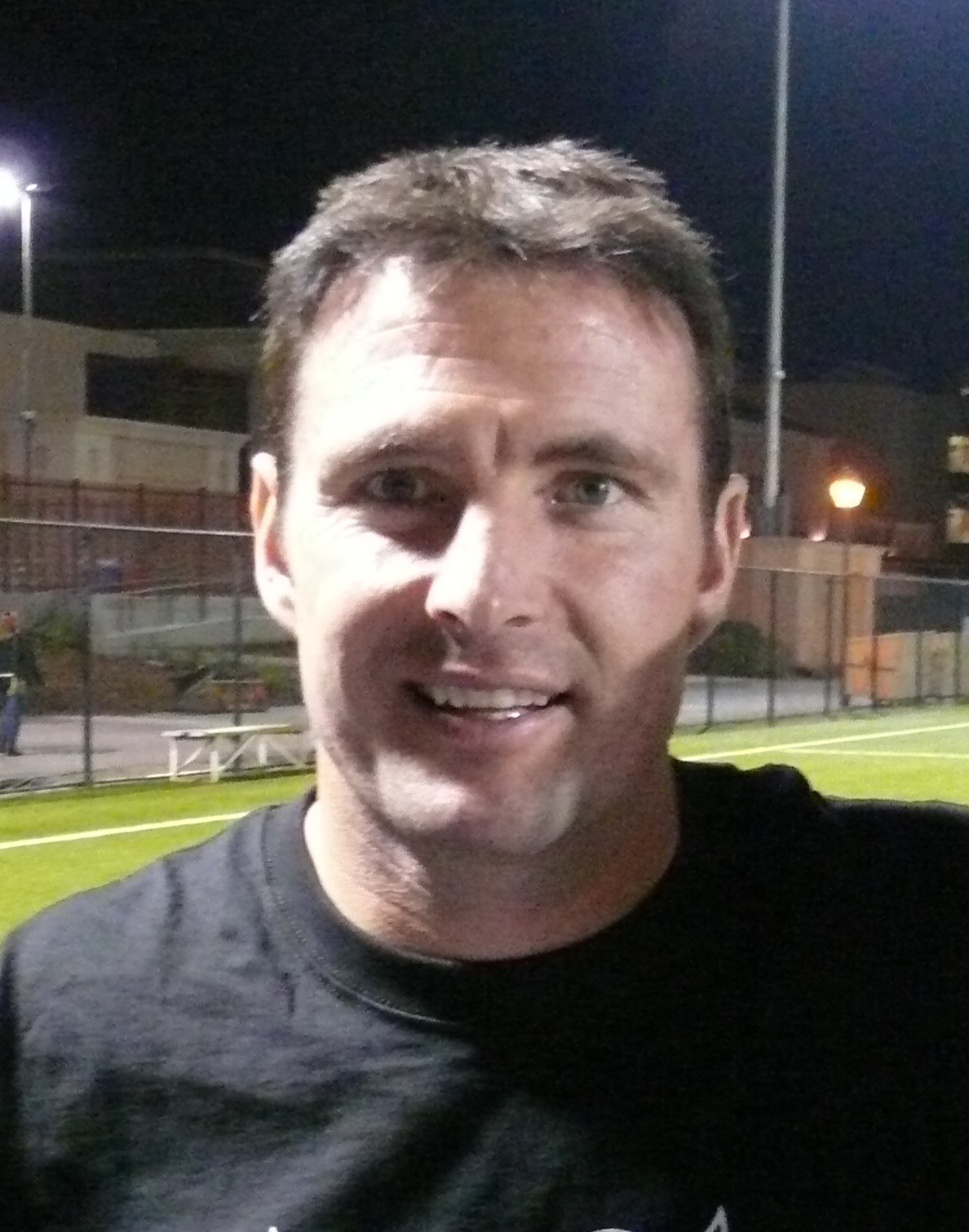
Joe Cannon has made the most appearances at goalie for the Earthquakes

The San Jose Earthquakes' most used goalkeeper all-time is Joe Cannon, who helped lead San Jose to their first MLS Cup in 2001 and won MLS Goalkeeper of the Year in 2002. Pat Onstad took on the starting role in 2003 after Cannon left the Earthquakes, leading the team to their second ever MLS Cup in 2003 and first ever Supporters' Shield in 2005, winning MLS Goalkeeper of the Year in both respective seasons. When the Earthquakes franchise was restarted in 2008, Cannon was the starting goalkeeper once again. Jon Busch became San Jose's starting goalkeeper in 2010, leading San Jose to playoff appearances in 2010 and 2012 as well as the club's second Supporters' Shield in the latter season. Long time backup David Bingham became the team's starting goalkeeper in 2015 and has since earned his first international caps for the United States as well as his first MLS All-Star appearance in 2016.

All statistics are for the MLS regular season games only, and are correct as of September 23, 2023.

Name	Country	Years	Games	Conceded	Shutouts (Note: A shutout occurs when a goalkeeper plays in a game without conceding a goal. This is sometimes known outside North America as a clean sheet.)	Int. caps	Notes
David Bingham	USA	2011–2017	104	124	30	3	
Matt Bersano	USA	2017–2022	5	7	2	0	
Jon Busch	USA	2010–2014	150	194	36	1	
Joe Cannon	USA	1999–2002; 2008–2010	171	228	44	2	
Jon Conway	USA	2000–2005	18	26	5	0	
Andy Kirk	USA	1998	9	21	2	0	
David Kramer	USA	1997–1999	44	76	6	0	
Tom Liner	USA	1996–1997	22	37	4	0	
Pat Onstad	Canada	2003–2005	84	92	27	57	
Dave Salzwedel	USA	1996–1997	34	52	6	0	
Andrew Tarbell	USA	2016–2019	54	25	2	0	
Andrew Weber	USA	2009–2011	2	3	0	0	
Daniel Vega	Argentina	2019-2021	49	99	10	0	
JT Marcinkowski	USA	2018-2024	95	159	18	0	
Daniel	Brazil	2023-	18	24	5	0	

== By nationality ==
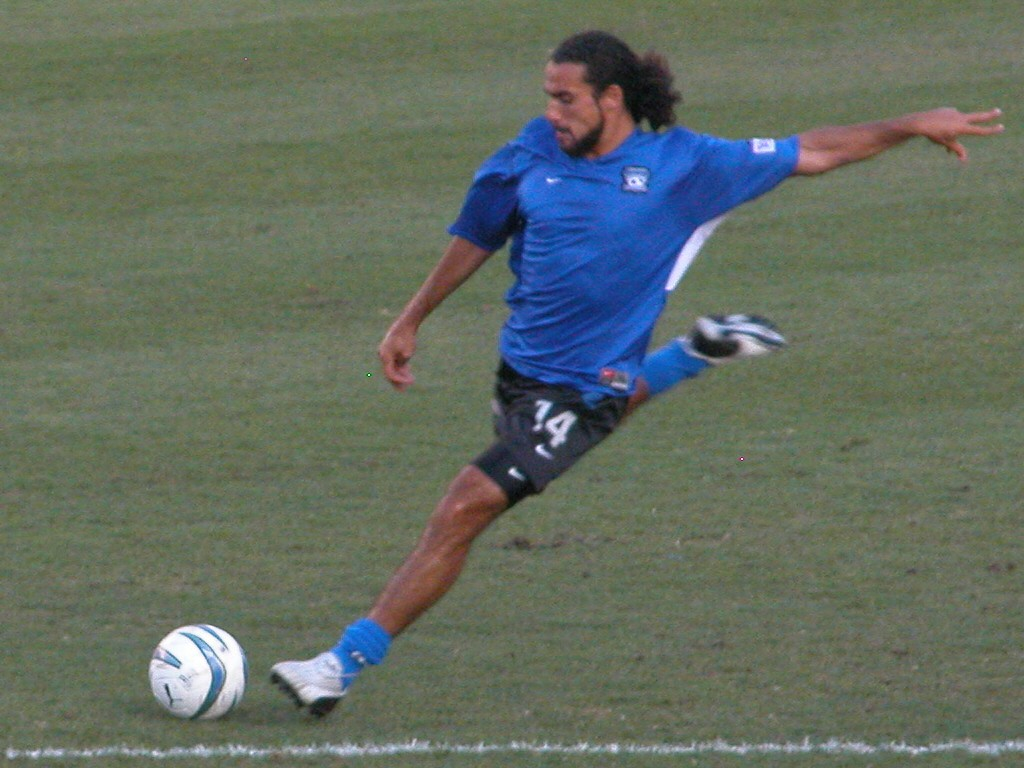
Dwayne De Rosario is the all-time leading scorer of the Canada national team

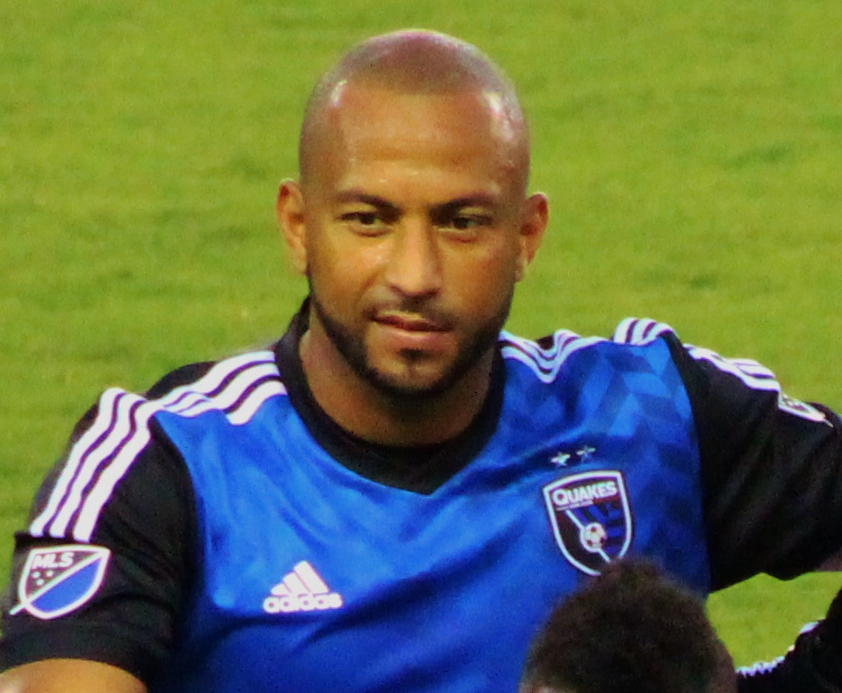
Víctor Bernárdez has 127 caps for Honduras.

MLS regulations permit teams to name eight players from outside of the United States in their rosters. However, this limit can be exceeded by trading international slots with another MLS team, or if one or more of the overseas players is a refugee or has permanent residency rights in the USA. As of November 30, 2017, ninety-nine players from outside the United States have played in MLS for the San Jose Earthquakes.

Country	Number of players	Games
Albania	1	30
Argentina	3	32
Armenia	1	5
Brazil	8	79
Canada	4	213
Cape Verde	1	3
Chile	2	33
Colombia	2	19
Corsica	1	27
Costa Rica	4	105
Denmark	1	91
Ecuador	2	29
El Salvador	6	300
England	3	111
Eritrea	1	8
Gambia	2	33
Georgia	1	13
Germany	2	33
Ghana	1	14
Guam	1	58
Guatemala	1	29
Haiti	2	5
Honduras	4	203
Hungary	1	23
Iran	2	107
Ireland	1	28
Jamaica	5	334
Liberia	1	3
Mexico	5	140
Morocco	1	11
Netherlands	1	32
New Zealand	2	19
Nigeria	2	89
Panama	3	89
Peru	1	1
Poland	1	25
Portugal	2	23
Puerto Rico	1	165
Saint Kitts and Nevis	1	24
Scotland	2	53
Sierra Leone	2	42
South Africa	3	17
Switzerland	2	19
Thailand	1	12
Trinidad and Tobago	4	186
Turkey	1	5
Turks and Caicos Islands	1	6
Uruguay	1	6
USA	123	5,386
Venezuela	2	35
