= 1996 San Jose Clash season =

San Jose Clash
1996 season
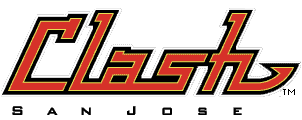
- Owner: Major League Soccer
- Coach: Laurie Calloway
- Stadium: Spartan Stadium
- Major League Soccer: Conference: 4th Overall: 7th
- MLS Cup: Conference Semifinals
- U.S. Open Cup: Did not qualify
- Top goalscorer: Paul Bravo (13)
- Highest home attendance: 31,728 (May 12 vs. Los Angeles)
- Lowest home attendance: 10,299 (May 29 vs. Kansas City)
- Average home league attendance: 17,231

The 1996 San Jose Clash season was, including previous iterations of the franchise, the sixteenth season of the team's existence, their first season in MLS, their first season in the top division of American soccer since 1984. The team won the inaugural MLS game against D.C. United.

== Squad ==
=== Current squad ===
Note: Flags indicate national team as defined under FIFA eligibility rules; some limited exceptions apply. Players may hold more than one non-FIFA nationality.

No.	Pos.	Nation	Player
1	GK	USA	Tom Liner
1	GK	USA	Dave Salzwedel
3	DF	USA	John Doyle
4	DF	COL	Rafael Amaya
5	DF	USA	Oscar Draguicevich
5	DF	NGA	Michael Emenalo
6	MF	NGA	Ben Iroha
7	MF	MEX	Missael Espinoza
8	FW	USA	Jeff Baicher
9	MF	USA	Paul Bravo
11	FW	USA	Eric Wynalda

No.	Pos.	Nation	Player
12	DF	USA	Troy Dayak
14	MF	USA	Paul Holocher
15	FW	CHI	Victor Mella
15	MF	JAM	Altimont Butler
17	DF	USA	Tim Martin
18	FW	USA	Ryshiem Henderson
19	DF	USA	Tayt Ianni
21	MF	USA	Eddie Lewis
22	MF	USA	Ramiro Corrales
23	MF	GUA	Jorge Rodas
24	MF	USA	Henry Gutierrez

== Competitions ==
=== Major League Soccer ===
==== Standings ====
===== Western Conference =====
Pos	Team	Pld	W	SOW	L	GF	GA	GD	Pts	Qualification
1	Los Angeles Galaxy	32	15	4	13	59	49	+10	49	MLS Cup Playoffs
2	Dallas Burn	32	12	5	15	50	48	+2	41	MLS Cup Playoffs
3	Kansas City Wiz	32	12	5	15	61	63	−2	41	MLS Cup Playoffs
4	San Jose Clash	32	12	3	17	50	50	0	39	MLS Cup Playoffs
5	Colorado Rapids	32	9	2	21	44	59	−15	29	

Source: MLS

===== Overall Table =====
Pos	Team	Pld	W	SOW	L	GF	GA	GD	Pts
5	Kansas City Wiz	32	12	5	15	61	63	−2	41
6	NY/NJ MetroStars	32	12	3	17	45	47	−2	39
7	San Jose Clash	32	12	3	17	50	50	0	39
8	Columbus Crew	32	11	4	17	59	60	−1	37
9	New England Revolution	32	9	6	17	43	56	−13	33

Source: MLS
Rules for classification: 1) points; 2) head-to-head record; 3) goal difference; 4) number of goals scored

==== Results by round ====
Matchday	1	2	3	4	5	6	7	8	9	10	11	12	13	14	15	16	17	18	19	20	21	22	23	24	25	26	27	28	29	30	31	32
Stadium	H	A	H	A	A	H	H	A	H	H	A	A	A	H	H	H	A	A	H	A	A	H	A	A	H	H	H	A	H	A	H	A
Result	W	L	L	L	W	W	L	L	W	SO	L	L	W	W	W	L	W	W	L	L	L	W	L	L	SO	W	L	W	L	L	L	SO

Source: FBREF.com
A = Away; H = Home; W = Win; L = Loss; SO = Shootout Win

==== Matches ====
April 6, 1996 1	San Jose Clash	1–0	D.C. United	San Jose, California
	Emenalo (yellow card) 44'; Wynalda 88'	Report	Díaz Arce (yellow card) 5'; Gori (yellow card) 44'; Harkes (yellow card) 72'; Fazlagic (yellow card) 87'	Stadium: Spartan Stadium; Attendance: 31,683; Referee: Esse Baharmast

April 14, 1996 2	Dallas Burn	0–0 (2–1 SO)	San Jose Clash	Dallas, Texas
	Ashton (yellow card) 50'; Álvarez (yellow card) 72'	Report	Emenalo (yellow card) 24'; Bravo (yellow card) 32'	Stadium: Cotton Bowl; Attendance: 27,779; Referee: Kevin Terry
	Shootout
	Kerr (penalty scored); Lozzano (penalty scored); Glenn (penalty missed); Álvarez (penalty missed)		(penalty missed) Wynalda; (penalty scored) Mella; (penalty missed) Iroha; (penalty missed) Bravo; (penalty missed) Doyle

April 21, 1996 3	San Jose Clash	2–2 (7–8 SO)	Kansas City Wiz	San Jose, California
	Iroha 7'; Holocher 33'; Rodas (yellow card) 34'; Wynalda (yellow card) 58'	Report	McKeon (yellow card) 3'; Okafor 16'; Ekemé (yellow card) 40' (yellow-red card) 47'; Prampin 86'	Stadium: Spartan Stadium; Attendance: 17,580; Referee: Brian Hall
	Shootout
	Iroha (penalty scored); Baicher (penalty missed); Rodas (penalty scored); Holocher (penalty missed); Wynalda (penalty missed); Doyle (penalty missed); Emenalo (penalty scored); Martin (penalty missed); Lewis (penalty missed); Dayak (penalty scored); Iroha (penalty scored); Baicher (penalty missed); Rodas (penalty missed); Holocher (penalty scored); Wynalda (penalty scored); Doyle (penalty missed)		(penalty missed) Prampin; (penalty scored) Chung; (penalty missed) Eichmann; (penalty missed) Preki; (penalty scored) Takawira; (penalty missed) Okafor; (penalty scored) Reasoner; (penalty missed) Bowers; (penalty missed) Uderitz; (penalty scored) Harrington; (penalty scored) Prampin; (penalty missed) Chung; (penalty missed) Eichmann; (penalty scored) Preki; (penalty scored) Takawira; (penalty scored) Okafor

April 28, 1996 4	Los Angeles Galaxy	2–1	San Jose Clash	Pasadena, California
	Vasquez 26'; Cienfuegos 44'	Report	Emenalo (yellow card) 30'; Rodas (yellow card) 42'; Iroha (yellow card) 58'; Bravo 77'	Stadium: Rose Bowl; Attendance: 40,347; Referee: Kevin Stott

May 4, 1996 5	New England Revolution	1–2	San Jose Clash	Foxborough, Massachusetts
	Woodring (yellow card) 39'; Aunger 86' (pen.)	Report	Emenalo (yellow card) 4'; Wynalda 23'; Doyle (yellow card) 30'; Dayak (yellow card) 37'; Bravo 70'	Stadium: Foxboro Stadium; Attendance: 16,334; Referee: Raul Dominguez

May 8, 1996 6	San Jose Clash	3–1	Colorado Rapids	San Jose, California
	Baicher 35'; Bravo 37', (yellow card) 38'; Emenalo (yellow card) 52'; Martin 72'	Report	Balboa 2'; Kmosko (yellow card) 6'; Henderson (yellow card) 58'	Stadium: Spartan Stadium; Attendance: 12,972; Referee: Tim Weyland

May 12, 1996 7	San Jose Clash	1–2	Los Angeles Galaxy	San Jose, California
	Gutierrez (yellow card) 7'; Bravo 75'	Report	Hurtado 9'; Semioli (yellow card) 15'; Motajo (yellow card) 27'; Salcedo (yellow card) 35'; Vanney 82'	Stadium: Spartan Stadium; Attendance: 31,728; Referee: Rich Grady

May 18, 1996 8	Tampa Bay Mutiny	3–2	San Jose Clash	Tampa, Florida
	Lassiter 18', 43'; Ralston 22'; Backman (yellow card) 28'; Pittman (yellow card) 45'; Yallop (yellow card) 90'	Report	Rodas (yellow card) 11'; Iroha (yellow card) 19'; Emenalo (yellow card) 21'; Espinoza (yellow card) 62'; Bravo 65' (pen.), 71'	Stadium: Houlihan's Stadium; Attendance: 12,047; Referee: Esse Baharmast

May 29, 1996 9	San Jose Clash	2–1	Kansas City Wiz	San Jose, California
	Martin (yellow card) 1'; Wynalda 23', 46', (yellow card) 85'; Emenalo (yellow card) 25'; Iroha (yellow card) 36'; Doyle (yellow card) 40'	Report	Lagerwey (yellow card) 22'; Uderitz (yellow card) 31'; Allnutt 70'	Stadium: Spartan Stadium; Attendance: 10,299; Referee: Kevin Stott

June 1, 1996 10	San Jose Clash	2–2 (2–1 SO)	Columbus Crew	San Jose, California
	Iroha (yellow card) 21'; Gutierrez 29'; Doyle (yellow card) 36'; Baicher (yellow card) 46'; Wynalda (yellow card) 63'; Butler 84'; Dayak (yellow card) 90'	Report	Watson (yellow card) 2'; Paz (yellow card) 11'; Marino 31'; McBride 68' (pen.); Oshoniyi (yellow card) 90'	Stadium: Spartan Stadium; Attendance: 16,077; Referee: Arturo Angeles
	Shootout
	Iroha (penalty missed); Wynalda (penalty missed); Butler (penalty scored); Rodas (penalty missed); Espinoza (penalty scored)		(penalty scored) Marino; (penalty missed) McBride; (penalty missed) Paz; (penalty missed) Ward; (penalty missed) Bliss

June 5, 1996 11	D.C. United	3–1	San Jose Clash	Washington, D.C.
	Díaz Arce 23'; Etcheverry (yellow card) 32'; Rammel 36', 49'; Williams (yellow card) 69'	Report	Iroha (yellow card) 33'; Emenalo (yellow card) 35'; Rodas (yellow card) 43'; Butler 68'	Stadium: RFK Stadium; Attendance: 15,845; Referee: Paul Tamberino

June 8, 1996 12	Dallas Burn	4–1	San Jose Clash	Dallas, Texas
	Sánchez 15'; Kreis 33'; Emenalo 44' (o.g.); Soñora 65'	Report	Espinoza 12'; Doyle (yellow card) 48'	Stadium: Cotton Bowl; Attendance: 25,187; Referee: Esse Baharmast

June 16, 1996 13	New York/New Jersey MetroStars	0–1	San Jose Clash	East Rutherford, New Jersey
	Baba (yellow card) 4'; Vermes (yellow card) 26'	Report	Baicher 14'; Iroha (yellow card) 58'	Stadium: Giants Stadium; Attendance: 18,404; Referee: Kevin Stott

June 23, 1996 14	San Jose Clash	2–1	D.C. United	San Jose, California
	Espinoza 41'; Draguicevich (yellow card) 58'; Baicher 66'; Espinoza (yellow card) 86'	Report	Díaz Arce 50'; Rammel (yellow card) 51'; Sanneh (yellow card) 67'	Stadium: Spartan Stadium; Attendance: 14,088; Referee: Frank Gorog

June 30, 1996 15	San Jose Clash	4–0	Tampa Bay Mutiny	San Jose, California
	Wynalda 1', 25', (yellow card) 22'; Bravo 34'; Espinoza 44'; Dayak (yellow card) 85'; Draguicevich (yellow card) 88'	Report	McKinley (yellow card) 5'; Ralston (yellow card) 32'; Kooiman (yellow card) 62'	Stadium: Spartan Stadium; Attendance: 19,380; Referee: Tim Weyland

July 6, 1996 16	San Jose Clash	1–1 (3–4 SO)	New England Revolution	San Jose, California
	Wynalda 60'; Doyle (yellow card) 64'	Report	Wélton (yellow card) 33'; Kerr 66'	Stadium: Spartan Stadium; Attendance: 18,813; Referee: Brian Hall
	Shootout
	Wynalda (penalty scored); Butler (penalty missed); Rodas (penalty missed); Iroha (penalty scored); Espinoza (penalty scored); Emenalo (penalty missed)		(penalty scored) Wélton; (penalty scored) Kerr; (penalty missed) Naveda; (penalty missed) Sawatzky; (penalty scored) Aunger; (penalty scored) Woodring

July 17, 1996 17	Colorado Rapids	1–2	San Jose Clash	Denver, Colorado
	Wegerle (yellow card) 54'; Bartlett 80'; Bates (yellow card) 88'	Report	Bravo 14', 50'; Rodas (yellow card) 84'; Draguicevich (yellow card) 86'	Stadium: Mile High Stadium; Attendance: 6,117; Referee: Joshua Patlak

July 20, 1996 18	Columbus Crew	3–4	San Jose Clash	Columbus, Ohio
	Warzycha 22'; McBride 37', 58'	Report	Wynalda 7'; Bravo 17', 60'; Baicher (yellow card) 42'; Doyle 50'; Draguicevich (yellow card) 56'; Espinoza (yellow card) 67' (yellow-red card) 73'	Stadium: Ohio Stadium; Attendance: 18,156; Referee: Ali Saheli

July 24, 1996 19	San Jose Clash	0–1	New York/New Jersey MetroStars	San Jose, California
	Rodas (yellow card) 29'	Report	Zaun (yellow card) 12'; Johnson 29'	Stadium: Spartan Stadium; Attendance: 15,096; Referee: Kevin Stott

July 28, 1996 20	New York/New Jersey MetroStars	4–1	San Jose Clash	East Rutherford, New Jersey
	Savarese (yellow card) 31'; Johnson 36'; Caricola (yellow card) 38'; Vermes 51'; Wood 80'; Harty 88'	Report	Emenalo (yellow card) 9'; Wynalda 39'; Doyle (red card) 42'; Lewis (red card) 81'	Stadium: Giants Stadium; Attendance: 21,212; Referee: Rich Grady

July 31, 1996 21	New England Revolution	2–0	San Jose Clash	Foxborough, Massachusetts
	Fraser (yellow card) 11'; Moore 48', 67'; Wylie (yellow card) 83'; Keegan (yellow card) 84'	Report	Emenalo (yellow card) 57'	Stadium: Foxboro Stadium; Attendance: 12,871; Referee: Ruben Rodhas

August 11, 1996 22	San Jose Clash	6–1	New England Revolution	San Jose, California
	Dayak 31', 70'; Espinoza 48', 84'; Doyle 62'; Rodas 81'	Report	Moore 8'; Olaroh (yellow card) 61' (yellow-red card) 79'	Stadium: Spartan Stadium; Attendance: 12,099; Referee: Kevin Terry

August 15, 1996 23	Kansas City Wiz	4–1	San Jose Clash	Kansas City, Missouri
	Johnston 5'; Preki 46'; Takawira 81', 88'	Report	Wynalda (yellow card) 33'; Doyle 78'	Stadium: Arrowhead Stadium; Attendance: 8,250; Referee: Esse Baharmast

August 18, 1996 24	Columbus Crew	2–0	San Jose Clash	Columbus, Ohio
	Maisonneuve 77'; Paz 82'	Report	Emenalo (yellow card) 23'; Espinoza (yellow card) 45'	Stadium: Ohio Stadium; Attendance: 16,629; Referee: Paul Tamberino

August 22, 1996 25	San Jose Clash	0–0 (3–2 SO)	Dallas Burn	San Jose, California
		Report	Sanchez (yellow card) 75' (yellow-red card) 82'; Lozzano (yellow card) 89'	Stadium: Spartan Stadium; Attendance: 13,359; Referee: Tim Weyland
	Shootout
	Wynalda (penalty scored); Baicher (penalty scored); Iroha (penalty scored); Rodas (penalty missed)		(penalty scored) Haynes; (penalty missed) Lozzano; (penalty missed) Ashton; (penalty scored) Farrer; (penalty missed) Santel

August 25, 1996 26	San Jose Clash	1–0	Colorado Rapids	San Jose, California
	Espinoza 1'	Report	Bartlett (yellow card) 36'	Stadium: Spartan Stadium; Attendance: 12,369; Referee: Marcel Yonan

September 1, 1996 27	San Jose Clash	1–1 (1–3 SO)	Los Angeles Galaxy	San Jose, California
	Espinoza 26'; Emenalo (yellow card) 62'	Report	Salcedo (yellow card) 29'; Wilson (yellow card) 38'; Jones 53'; Vanney (yellow card) 66'	Stadium: Spartan Stadium; Attendance: 26,184; Referee: Zimmerman Boulos
	Shootout
	Wynalda (penalty missed); Iroha (penalty missed); Bravo (penalty scored); Rodas (penalty missed)		(penalty missed) Jara; (penalty scored) Vanney; (penalty missed) Jones; (penalty scored) Garvey; (penalty scored) Salcedo

September 8, 1996 28	Colorado Rapids	1–3	San Jose Clash	Denver, Colorado
	Harbor 28', (red card) 33'; Cannon (yellow card) 43'	Report	Espinoza 24', 40'; Rodas (yellow card) 50'; Bravo 85'	Stadium: Mile High Stadium; Attendance: 8,990; Referee: Roberto Van de Wyngard

September 11, 1996 29	San Jose Clash	2–2 (1–3 SO)	Dallas Burn	San Jose, California
	Espinoza 49'; Draguicevich (yellow card) 59' (yellow-red card) 84'; Iroha 74'	Report	Haynes (yellow card) 55', (goal) 79'; Álvarez (yellow card) 56'; Kreis 87'	Stadium: Spartan Stadium; Attendance: 10,894; Referee: Frank Gorog
	Shootout
	Wynalda (penalty scored); Iroha (penalty missed); Baicher (penalty missed); Rodas (penalty missed)		(penalty missed) Lozzano; (penalty scored) Haynes; (penalty scored) Sanchez; (penalty missed) Ashton; (penalty scored) Farrer

September 15, 1996 30	Los Angeles Galaxy	4–2	San Jose Clash	Pasadena, California
	Karapetyan 12'; Onalfo (yellow card) 19'; Armas 32'; Hurtado 78', 83', (yellow card) 80'	Report	Espinoza (yellow card) 19'; Corrales (yellow card) 43'; Bravo 69'; Emenalo (yellow card) 78'; Doyle (yellow card) 81'; Wynalda 86' (pen.)	Stadium: Rose Bowl; Attendance: 14,179; Referee: Arturo Angeles

September 18, 1996 31	San Jose Clash	1–1 (1–3 SO)	Tampa Bay Mutiny	San Jose, California
	Corrales 3'	Report	Pittman (yellow card) 2'; Frye (yellow card) 35'; Lassiter 55'; Kooiman (yellow card) 58'; Viera (yellow card) 90'	Stadium: Spartan Stadium; Attendance: 13,091; Referee: Zimmerman Boulos
	Shootout
	Wynalda (penalty missed); Iroha (penalty missed); Bravo (penalty missed); Rodas (penalty scored)		(penalty scored) Hunjak; (penalty scored) Lassiter; (penalty missed) Ralston; (penalty missed) Vásquez; (penalty scored) Pittman

September 21, 1996 32	Kansas City Wiz	0–0 (1–2 SO)	San Jose Clash	Kansas City, Missouri
		Report	Wynalda (yellow card) 19'; Martin (yellow card) 73'	Stadium: Arrowhead Stadium; Attendance: 18,594; Referee: Marcel Yonan
	Shootout
	Chung (penalty missed); Wright (penalty missed); Preki (penalty scored); Sorber (penalty missed); Prampin (penalty missed)		(penalty scored) Wynalda; (penalty missed) Iroha; (penalty missed) Espinoza; (penalty missed) Rodas; (penalty scored) Bravo

(SO) = Shootout

=== MLS Cup Playoffs ===
==== Western Conference semifinals ====
September 26, 1996 Game 1	San Jose Clash	1–0	Los Angeles Galaxy	San Jose, California
	Ianni 36'; Wynalda (yellow card) 90'	Report	Onalfo (yellow card) 30'; Calichman (yellow card) 38'; Salcedo (yellow card) 89'	Stadium: Spartan Stadium; Attendance: 17,209; Referee: Kevin Stott

September 29, 1996 Game 2	Los Angeles Galaxy	2–0	San Jose Clash	Pasadena, California
	Hurtado (yellow card) 29', (goal) 90'; Fraser 84'	Report	Emenalo (yellow card) 1'; Rodas (yellow card) 22'; Wynalda (yellow card) 28' (yellow-red card) 87'; Draguicevich (yellow card) 90' (red card) 90'	Stadium: Rose Bowl; Attendance: 27,833; Referee: Joshua Patlak

October 2, 1996 Game 3	Los Angeles Galaxy	2–0	San Jose Clash	Pasadena, California
	Hurtado 31'; Cienfuegos 36' (pen.)	Report	Espinoza (yellow card) 25'; Iroha (yellow card) 35'	Stadium: Rose Bowl; Attendance: 30,231; Referee: Esse Baharmast
