= 1997 San Jose Clash season =

San Jose Clash
1997 season
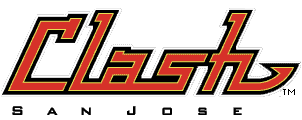
- Owner: Major League Soccer
- Coach: Brian Quinn
- Stadium: Spartan Stadium
- Major League Soccer: Conference: 5th Overall: 10th
- MLS Cup: Did not qualify
- U.S. Open Cup: Quarterfinals
- California Clásico: 1st
- Top goalscorer: Ronald Cerritos (12)

The 1997 San Jose Clash season was the second season of the team's existence. San Jose finished the season in fifth place missing the playoffs for the first time. The season also saw head coach Laurie Calloway replaced by Brian Quinn halfway through the season. Controversy surrounded Eric Wynalda and Laurie Calloway. Tayt Ianni, Mac Cozier, Edumundo Rodriguez and Tom Liner were released halfway through the season when Calloway was replaced. Daniel Guzman played in only three games for the Clash before returning to Mexico.

== Squad ==
=== Current squad ===
Note: Flags indicate national team as defined under FIFA eligibility rules; some limited exceptions apply. Players may hold more than one non-FIFA nationality.

No.	Pos.	Nation	Player
0	GK	USA	Louis Mata
1	GK	USA	Tom Liner
1	GK	USA	Dave Salzwedel
3	DF	USA	John Doyle
4	DF	USA	Curt Onalfo
2	DF	USA	Oscar Draguicevich
29	MF	USA	Alberto Montoya
5	DF	NGA	Michael Emenalo
6	MF	NGA	Ben Iroha
6	DF	BRA	Arnold Cruz
7	DF	USA	Dominic Kinnear
8	FW	USA	Jeff Baicher
9	FW	USA	Lawrence Lozzano
10	MF	USA	Christopher Sullivan
11	FW	USA	Eric Wynalda
12	DF	USA	Troy Dayak

No.	Pos.	Nation	Player
13	FW	USA	Shawn Medved
14	FW	USA	Daniel Guzman
14	FW	USA	Esmundo Rodriguez
15	DF	HUN	Istvan Urbanyi
16	MF	USA	Steve Rullo
17	DF	USA	Tim Martin
18	MF	USA	Alberto Montoya
19	DF	USA	Tayt Ianni
20	FW	SLV	Ronald Cerritos
20	FW	USA	Mac Cozier
21	MF	USA	Eddie Lewis
22	MF	USA	Ramiro Corrales
23	MF	USA	Chris McDonald
24	GK	USA	David Kramer
25	DF	USA	Jason Annichero
27	MF	USA	Steve Rullo
28	FW	USA	Edmundo Rodriguez

== Competitions ==
=== Major League Soccer ===
==== Matches ====
March 22, 1997	San Jose Clash	0–0 (4–3 SO)	New York/New Jersey MetroStars	San Jose, California
		Report		Stadium: Spartan Stadium; Attendance: 23,501

March 29, 1997	Kansas City Wizards	2–2 (4–3 SO)	San Jose Clash	Kansas City, Missouri
	Johnston 13'; Preki 53'	Report	Wynalda 50', 65'	Stadium: Arrowhead Stadium; Attendance: 10,198

April 5, 1997	Dallas Burn	2–1	San Jose Clash	Dallas, Texas
	Santel 37'; Elliott 66'	Report	Dayak 57'	Stadium: Cotton Bowl; Attendance: 6,195

April 12, 1997	San Jose Clash	4–1	Los Angeles Galaxy	San Jose, California
	Kinnear 9'; Doyle 61'; Cerritos 70'; Urbányi 89'	Report	Cienfuegos 38'	Stadium: Spartan Stadium; Attendance: 17,628

April 19, 1997	Columbus Crew	1–1 (2–1 SO)	San Jose Clash	Columbus, Ohio
	Marino 2'	Report	Baicher 50'	Stadium: Ohio Stadium; Attendance: 18,358

April 26, 1997	D.C. United	2–2 (0–2 SO)	San Jose Clash	Washington, D.C.
	Moreno 9'; Díaz Arce 23'	Report	Baicher 67', 78'	Stadium: RFK Stadium; Attendance: 24,775

May 3, 1997	San Jose Clash	1–3	Columbus Crew	San Jose, California
	Medved 73'	Report	Bliss 35'; Khumalo 56'; McBride 71'	Stadium: Spartan Stadium; Attendance: 14,295

May 9, 1997	New York/New Jersey MetroStars	0–1	San Jose Clash	East Rutherford, New Jersey
		Report	Lozzano 47'	Stadium: Giants Stadium; Attendance: 14,724

May 16, 1997	San Jose Clash	1–1 (0–3 SO)	New England Revolution	San Jose, California
	Dayak 7'	Report	Baba 52'	Stadium: Spartan Stadium; Attendance: 10,532

May 18, 1997	Los Angeles Galaxy	1–1 (3–2 SO)	San Jose Clash	Pasadena, California
	Wélton 32'	Report	Lozzano 47'	Stadium: Rose Bowl; Attendance: 10,338

May 22, 1997	D.C. United	3–1	San Jose Clash	Washington, D.C.
	Moreno 8', 87'; Díaz Arce 31'	Report	Wynalda 77'	Stadium: RFK Stadium; Attendance: 12,214

June 1, 1997	San Jose Clash	2–3	D.C. United	San Jose, California
	Lozzano 21'; Doyle 86'	Report	Rammel 2'; Kelderman 39'; Sanneh 86'	Stadium: Spartan Stadium; Attendance: 14,071

June 8, 1997	San Jose Clash	2–3	Kansas City Wizards	San Jose, California
	Wynalda 18'; Lozzano 61'	Report	Chung 44'; Preki 58', 87'	Stadium: Spartan Stadium; Attendance: 11,629

June 15, 1997	Kansas City Wizards	1–3	San Jose Clash	Kansas City, Missouri
	Bowers 43'	Report	Cerritos 33'; Sullivan 74'; Cerritos 80'	Stadium: Arrowhead Stadium; Attendance: 7,431

June 21, 1997	Tampa Bay Mutiny	3–1	San Jose Clash	Tampa, Florida
	Valderrama 8'; Lassiter 39'; Wise 90'	Report	Cerritos 35'	Stadium: Houlihan's Stadium; Attendance: 9,462

June 28, 1997	San Jose Clash	3–1	Dallas Burn	San Jose, California
	Medved 48'; Lozzano 71'; Kinnear 89'	Report	Damián 18'	Stadium: Spartan Stadium; Attendance: 11,941

July 4, 1997	Colorado Rapids	3–1	San Jose Clash	Denver, Colorado
	Vermes 19'; Bravo 58', 68'	Report	Cerritos 5'	Stadium: Mile High Stadium; Attendance: 36,252

July 6, 1997	San Jose Clash	3–2	New England Revolution	San Jose, California
	Baicher 37'; Dayak 45'; Cerritos 72'	Report	Naveda 38'; Lalas 59'	Stadium: Spartan Stadium; Attendance: 11,753

July 13, 1997	San Jose Clash	2–2 (3–5 SO)	Tampa Bay Mutiny	San Jose, California
	Lewis 56'; Cerritos 70'	Report	Galderisi 31'; Vargas 90'	Stadium: Spartan Stadium; Attendance: 12,771

July 18, 1997	Dallas Burn	3–1	San Jose Clash	Dallas, Texas
	Washington 42', 46', 68'	Report	Baicher 25'	Stadium: Cotton Bowl; Attendance: 7,371

July 20, 1997	Tampa Bay Mutiny	3–1	San Jose Clash	Tampa, Florida
	Vásquez 37'; Gilmar 65'; Lassiter 72'	Report	Cerritos 65'	Stadium: Houlihan's Stadium; Attendance: 8,781

July 25, 1997	San Jose Clash	1–2	Colorado Rapids	San Jose, California
	Sullivan 8'	Report	Trittschuh 2'; Patiño 41'	Stadium: Spartan Stadium; Attendance: 11,003

August 3, 1997	New England Revolution	1–5	San Jose Clash	Foxborough, Massachusetts
	Baba 22'	Report	Lozzano 36', 68'; Baicher 71', 90'; Emenalo 84'	Stadium: Foxboro Stadium; Attendance: 22,673

August 9, 1997	San Jose Clash	1–1 (4–3 SO)	Columbus Crew	San Jose, California
	Lozzano 70'	Report	Dooley 45'	Stadium: Spartan Stadium; Attendance: 11,799

August 17, 1997	Los Angeles Galaxy	2–3	San Jose Clash	Pasadena, California
	Machón 48'; Cienfuegos 80'	Report	Lozzano 15'; Baicher 27', 36'	Stadium: Rose Bowl; Attendance: 22,621

August 24, 1997	San Jose Clash	2–2 (1–2 SO)	Kansas City Wizards	San Jose, California
	Cerritos 6'; Baicher 88'	Report	Preki 51'; McKeon 90'	Stadium: Spartan Stadium; Attendance: 13,605

August 29, 1997	New York/New Jersey MetroStars	3–0	San Jose Clash	East Rutherford, New Jersey
	Donadoni 41'; Savarese 48', 54'	Report		Stadium: Giants Stadium; Attendance: 14,511

September 6, 1997	San Jose Clash	4–0	New York/New Jersey MetroStars	San Jose, California
	Cerritos 23'; Zico 57'; Medved 68'; Lozzano 89'	Report		Stadium: Spartan Stadium; Attendance: 14,020

September 11, 1997	San Jose Clash	0–1	Dallas Burn	San Jose, California
		Report	Damián 70'	Stadium: Spartan Stadium; Attendance: 7,955

September 17, 1997	Colorado Rapids	1–2	San Jose Clash	Denver, Colorado
	Paz 74'	Report	Cerritos 41'; Wynalda 61'	Stadium: Mile High Stadium; Attendance: 6,955

September 21, 1997	San Jose Clash	2–3	Los Angeles Galaxy	San Jose, California
	Cerritos 22'; Lewis 68'	Report	Vasquez 71', 76', 80'	Stadium: Spartan Stadium; Attendance: 20,117

September 28, 1997	San Jose Clash	1–3	Colorado Rapids	San Jose, California
	Medved 87'	Report	Bravo 35'; Vermes 53'; Balboa 67'	Stadium: Spartan Stadium; Attendance: 10,926

(SO) = Shootout

=== U.S. Open Cup ===
July 27, 1997 Third Round	Central Coast Roadrunners	2–5	San Jose Clash
		Report	Lozzano 26', 81'; Zico 44'; Baicher 75'; Cerritos 83'	Attendance: 7,112

August 20, 1997 Quarterfinal	San Jose Clash	1–2	S.F. Bay Seals
	Cerritos 20'	Report	Simpson 77'; Watkins 86'	Attendance: 4,327

=== Friendlies ===
September 24, 1997	California Jaguars	1–3	San Jose Clash	Salinas, California
			Onalfo 3'; Lozzano 81'; Cerritos 83'

=== Standings ===
Pos	Team	Pld	W	SOW	L	GF	GA	GD	Pts	Qualification
1	Kansas City Wizards	32	14	7	11	57	51	+6	49	MLS Cup Playoffs
2	Los Angeles Galaxy	32	14	2	16	55	44	+11	44	MLS Cup Playoffs
3	Dallas Burn	32	13	3	16	55	49	+6	42	MLS Cup Playoffs
4	Colorado Rapids	32	12	2	18	50	59	−9	38	MLS Cup Playoffs
5	San Jose Clash	32	9	3	20	55	59	−4	30	

Source: MLS

Pos	Team	Pld	W	SOW	L	GF	GA	GD	Pts	Qualification
1	D.C. United (C, S)	32	17	4	11	70	53	+17	55	CONCACAF Champions' Cup
2	Kansas City Wizards	32	14	7	11	57	51	+6	49	
3	Tampa Bay Mutiny	32	14	3	15	55	60	−5	45	
4	Los Angeles Galaxy	32	14	2	16	55	44	+11	44	
5	Dallas Burn	32	13	3	16	55	49	+6	42	
6	Columbus Crew	32	12	3	17	42	41	+1	39	
7	Colorado Rapids	32	12	2	18	50	59	−9	38	CONCACAF Champions' Cup
8	New England Revolution	32	11	4	17	40	53	−13	37	
9	NY/NJ MetroStars	32	11	2	19	43	53	−10	35	
10	San Jose Clash	32	9	3	20	55	59	−4	30	

Source: MLS
Rules for classification: 1) points; 2) head-to-head record; 3) goal difference; 4) number of goals scored
(C) Champions; (S) Supporters' Shield
