= 1996 Dallas Burn season =

Dallas Burn
1996 season
- Owner: Major League Soccer
- Head coach: Dave Dir
- Stadium: Cotton Bowl
- MLS: Conference: 2nd Overall: 4th
- MLS Cup: Lost Semifinals vs. Kansas City Wiz (1–2)
- U.S. Open Cup: Lost Semifinals vs. D.C. United
- Highest home attendance: 35,250 vs. Columbus Crew (May 5, 1996)
- Lowest home attendance: 7,338 vs. Columbus Crew (August 14, 1996)
- Average home league attendance: 16,012 (regular season); 9,964 (playoffs)
Home colors	Away colors

The 1996 Dallas Burn season was the inaugural season of the Major League Soccer team. It was the first time since 1981 that the Dallas-Fort Worth metroplex had a professional soccer team. The team made the playoffs for the first time in franchise history.

== Final standings ==
=== Western Conference ===
Pos	Team	Pld	W	SOW	L	GF	GA	GD	Pts	Qualification
1	Los Angeles Galaxy	32	15	4	13	59	49	+10	49	MLS Cup Playoffs
2	Dallas Burn	32	12	5	15	50	48	+2	41	MLS Cup Playoffs
3	Kansas City Wiz	32	12	5	15	61	63	−2	41	MLS Cup Playoffs
4	San Jose Clash	32	12	3	17	50	50	0	39	MLS Cup Playoffs
5	Colorado Rapids	32	9	2	21	44	59	−15	29	

Source: MLS

=== Overall table ===
Pos	Team	Pld	W	SOW	L	GF	GA	GD	Pts	Qualification
2	Los Angeles Galaxy	32	15	4	13	59	49	+10	49	CONCACAF Champions' Cup
3	D.C. United (C)	32	15	1	16	62	56	+6	46	CONCACAF Champions' Cup
4	Dallas Burn	32	12	5	15	50	48	+2	41	
5	Kansas City Wiz	32	12	5	15	61	63	−2	41	
6	NY/NJ MetroStars	32	12	3	17	45	47	−2	39	

Source: MLS
Rules for classification: 1) points; 2) head-to-head record; 3) goal difference; 4) number of goals scored
(C) Champions

== Regular season ==
=== Results by round ===
Matchday	1	2	3	4	5	6	7	8	9	10	11	12	13	14	15	16	17	18	19	20	21	22	23	24	25	26	27	28	29	30	31	32
Stadium	H	H	A	A	A	H	A	H	H	A	H	H	H	A	A	H	H	A	A	H	A	H	A	H	H	A	A	A	H	A	H	A
Result	SO	W	L	W	L	SO	W	W	L	L	L	W	SO	L	W	L	SO	L	L	W	W	W	W	W	L	L	W	L	L	SO	L	L

Source: FBREF.com
A = Away; H = Home; W = Win; L = Loss; SO = Shootout Win

=== Match Results ===
April 14, 1996 1	Dallas Burn	0–0 (2–1 SO)	San Jose Clash	Dallas, Texas
	Ashton (yellow card) 50'; Álvarez (yellow card) 72'	Recap	Emenalo (yellow card) 24'; Bravo (yellow card) 32'	Stadium: Cotton Bowl; Attendance: 27,779; Referee: Kevin Terry
	Shootout
	Kerr (penalty scored); Lozzano (penalty scored); Glenn (penalty missed); Álvarez (penalty missed)		(penalty missed) Wynalda; (penalty scored) Mella; (penalty missed) Iroha; (penalty missed) Bravo; (penalty missed) Doyle

April 18, 1996 2	Dallas Burn	3–0	Kansas City Wiz	Dallas, Texas
	Kreis 48'; Álvarez (yellow card) 61'; Rodriguez 72'; Kerr 85'	Recap	Ekemé (yellow card) 63'	Stadium: Cotton Bowl; Attendance: 9,405; Referee: Kevin Stott

April 21, 1996 3	Colorado Rapids	3–1	Dallas Burn	Denver, Colorado
	Hamlett (yellow card) 19'; Balboa 48', 64'; Bartlett 57'	Recap	Soñora (yellow card) 1'; Kerr 59'; Puskarich (yellow card) 87'	Stadium: Mile High Stadium; Attendance: 21,711; Referee: Esse Baharmast

April 28, 1996 4	Tampa Bay Mutiny	1–2	Dallas Burn	Tampa, Florida
	Lassiter 81'	Recap	Soñora (yellow card) 21'; Kreis 24'; Rodriguez 30'; Álvarez (yellow card) 54'	Stadium: Tampa Stadium; Attendance: 14,084; Referee: Raul Dominguez

May 1, 1996 5	D.C. United	3–1	Dallas Burn	Washington, D.C.
	Diaz Arce 15' (pen.); Rammel (yellow card) 39', (goal) 64'; Agoos (yellow card) 53'; Etcheverry 53'	Recap	Puskarich (yellow card) 15'; Lozzano (yellow card) 24'; Rodriguez (yellow card) 31', (goal) 43' (pen.); Santel (yellow card) 53'; Álvarez (yellow card) 62'	Stadium: RFK Stadium; Attendance: 11,253; Referee: Byungil Noh

May 5, 1996 6	Dallas Burn	0–0 (3–1 SO)	Columbus Crew	Dallas, Texas
	Álvarez (yellow card) 16' (yellow-red card) 87'	Recap	Michallik (yellow card) 10'	Stadium: Cotton Bowl; Attendance: 35,250; Referee: Brian Hall
	Shootout
	Haynes (penalty scored); Rodriguez (penalty scored); Lozzano (penalty missed); Ashton (penalty scored)		(penalty missed) McBride; (penalty missed) Thompson; (penalty missed) Ward; (penalty scored) Carrera

May 11, 1996 7	Kansas City Wiz	2–3	Dallas Burn	Kansas City, Missouri
	Uderitz (yellow card) 24' (yellow-red card) 84'; Preki 38' (pen.), 45'; Klopas (yellow card) 39'	Recap	Kreis 27'; Eck (yellow card) 75'; Kerr 79'; Rodriguez 85'	Stadium: Arrowhead Stadium; Attendance: 17,706; Referee: Ted Covaciu

May 18, 1996 8	Dallas Burn	3–2	D.C. United	Dallas, Texas
	Kreis 40', 82'; Eck (yellow card) 63'; Álvarez (yellow card) 75'; Sanchez 88', (yellow card) 90'	Recap	Harkes (yellow card) 37'; Sanneh 65'; Agoos 90'	Stadium: Cotton Bowl; Attendance: 23,251; Referee: Arturo Angeles

May 23, 1996 9	Dallas Burn	0–1	Tampa Bay Mutiny	Dallas, Texas
	Soñora (yellow card) 56'; Santel (yellow card) 63'	Recap	McKinley (yellow card) 10'; Yallop (yellow card) 76'; Lassiter 82'	Stadium: Cotton Bowl; Attendance: 11,457; Referee: Tim Weyland

May 29, 1996 10	Colorado Rapids	2–0	Dallas Burn	Denver, Colorado
	Henderson 24'; Harbor 67' (pen.)	Recap		Stadium: Mile High Stadium; Attendance: 10,971; Referee: Brian Hall

June 2, 1996 11	Dallas Burn	0–1	New York/New Jersey Metrostars	Dallas, Texas
	Rodriguez (yellow card) 66' (yellow-red card) 67'	Recap	Vermes (yellow card) 60'; Wood 62'	Stadium: Cotton Bowl; Attendance: 10,610; Referee: Kevin Terry

June 8, 1996 12	Dallas Burn	4–1	San Jose Clash	Dallas, Texas
	Sanchez 15'; Kreis 33'; Emenalo 44' (o.g.); Soñora 65'	Recap	Espinoza 12'; Doyle (yellow card) 48'	Stadium: Cotton Bowl; Attendance: 25,187; Referee: Esse Baharmast

June 15, 1996 13	Dallas Burn	1–1 (4–2 SO)	Colorado Rapids	Dallas, Texas
	Álvarez (yellow card) 4'; Sanchez 73'	Recap	Harbor 1'; Hamlett (yellow card) 36'; Trittschuh (yellow card) 39'	Stadium: Cotton Bowl; Attendance: 9,704; Referee: Rich Grady
	Shootout
	Haynes (penalty scored); Lozzano (penalty scored); Ashton (penalty scored); Santel (penalty scored)		(penalty missed) Henderson; (penalty missed) Bates; (penalty scored) Benedetti; (penalty scored) Harbor

June 19, 1996 14	New York/New Jersey Metrostars	0–0 (2–0 SO)	Dallas Burn	East Rutherford, New Jersey
		Recap	Álvarez (yellow card) 33'; Lozzano (yellow card) 50'	Stadium: Giants Stadium; Attendance: 14,322; Referee: Esse Baharmast
	Shootout
	Knowles (penalty scored); Lagos (penalty missed); Joseph (penalty scored)		(penalty missed) Haynes; (penalty missed) Lozzano; (penalty missed) Santel; (penalty missed) Soñora

June 23, 1996 15	New England Revolution	1–4	Dallas Burn	Foxborough, Massachusetts
	Keegan 27'; Naveda (yellow card) 31'; Aunger (yellow card) 43'; Fraser (yellow card) 59'; Wélton (yellow card) 68'	Recap	Álvarez (yellow card) 29' (yellow-red card) 80'; Sanchez (yellow card) 30'; Lozzano 36'; Farrer 48'; Santel 60'; Haynes 89'	Stadium: Foxboro Stadium; Attendance: 17,066; Referee: Edwin Resendes

June 29, 1996 16	Dallas Burn	0–1	Kansas City Wiz	Dallas, Texas
	Flores (yellow card) 60'; Farrer (yellow card) 89'	Recap	Ekemé (yellow card) 10'; Okafor (yellow card) 34'; Sorber 39'; Gutiérrez (yellow card) 66'	Stadium: Cotton Bowl; Attendance: 9,615; Referee: Joshua Patlak

July 4, 1996 17	Dallas Burn	1–1 (3–1 SO)	D.C. United	Dallas, Texas
	Kreis 33'; Santel (yellow card) 39'; Sanchez (yellow card) 71'	Recap	Sanneh (yellow card) 21'; Diaz Arce 61', (yellow card) 77'	Stadium: Cotton Bowl; Attendance: 16,177; Referee: Tim Weyland
	Shootout
	Ashton (penalty scored); Santel (penalty missed); Sanchez (penalty scored); Farrer (penalty scored)		(penalty missed) Imler; (penalty missed) Kelderman; (penalty scored) Agoos; (penalty missed) Sanneh

July 7, 1996 18	D.C. United	6–1	Dallas Burn	Washington, D.C.
	Diaz Arce 3', 48', 61', 63'; Rammel 18', 77'; Williams (yellow card) 68'	Recap	Ashton 69'	Stadium: RFK Stadium; Attendance: 11,244; Referee: Paul Tamberino

July 10, 1996 19	New York/New Jersey Metrostars	3–2	Dallas Burn	East Rutherford, New Jersey
	Harty (yellow card) 32'; Caricola 35'; Savarese 48', 77'; Johnson (yellow card) 49'; Ramos (yellow card) 53'; Meola (yellow card) 63'	Recap	Álvarez (yellow card) 32', (goal) 63' (pen.); Kreis (yellow card) 65'; Sanchez 66', (yellow card) 90'	Stadium: Giants Stadium; Attendance: 17,416; Referee: Ruben Rodhas

July 17, 1996 20	Dallas Burn	5–2	Los Angeles Galaxy	Dallas, Texas
	Ibsen (yellow card) 16', (goal) 28'; Kreis 23', 47'; Álvarez (yellow card) 25'; Haynes 69'; Elliott 83'	Recap	Semioli (yellow card) 39'; Hurtado 66'; Jones 70'	Stadium: Cotton Bowl; Attendance: 17,665; Referee: Rich Grady

July 20, 1996 21	Kansas City Wiz	1–2	Dallas Burn	Kansas City, Missouri
	Preki 22' (pen.)	Recap	Kreis 13'; Santel (yellow card) 22'; Elliott 75'	Stadium: Arrowhead Stadium; Attendance: 11,592; Referee: Brian Hall

July 27, 1996 22	Dallas Burn	3–0	Colorado Rapids	Dallas, Texas
	Álvarez 53'; Sanchez 64' (pen.); Elliott 78'	Recap		Stadium: Cotton Bowl; Attendance: 9,081; Referee: Arturo Angeles

July 31, 1996 23	Columbus Crew	1–2	Dallas Burn	Columbus, Ohio
	Iribarren (yellow card) 10'; Caligiuri (yellow card) 30'; Warzycha (yellow card) 53'; McBride 83'	Recap	Kreis 27'; Sanchez (yellow card) 29'; Lozzano 47'	Stadium: Ohio Stadium; Attendance: 13,190; Referee: Tim Weyland

August 10, 1996 24	Dallas Burn	2–1	Tampa Bay Mutiny	Dallas, Texas
	Santel (yellow card) 9'; Álvarez 16', (yellow card) 89'; Haynes 32'; Kreis (yellow card) 66'	Recap	Lassiter 35'; Vásquez (yellow card) 80'	Stadium: Cotton Bowl; Attendance: 12,503; Referee: Kevin Stott

August 14, 1996 25	Dallas Burn	2–2 (2–3 SO)	Columbus Crew	Dallas, Texas
	Elliott 73', 76'	Recap	Carrera 62'; Iribarren (yellow card) 76' (yellow-red card) 79'; McBride 83'	Stadium: Cotton Bowl; Attendance: 7,338; Referee: Zimmerman Boulos
	Shootout
	Haynes (penalty missed); Lozzano (penalty scored); Sanchez (penalty scored); Farrer (penalty missed); Elliott (penalty missed); Kreis (penalty missed); Puskarich (penalty missed); Soñora (penalty missed); Flores (penalty missed)		(penalty scored) Carrera; (penalty missed) Marino; (penalty missed) Maisonneuve; (penalty missed) Yeagley; (penalty scored) Paz; (penalty missed) Caligiuri; (penalty missed) McBride; (penalty missed) Smith; (penalty scored) Clark

August 22, 1996 26	San Jose Clash	0–0 (3–2 SO)	Dallas Burn	San Jose, California
		Recap	Sanchez (yellow card) 75' (yellow-red card) 82'; Lozzano (yellow card) 89'	Stadium: Spartan Stadium; Attendance: 13,359; Referee: Tim Weyland
	Shootout
	Wynalda (penalty scored); Baicher (penalty scored); Iroha (penalty scored); Rodas (penalty missed)		(penalty scored) Haynes; (penalty missed) Lozzano; (penalty missed) Ashton; (penalty scored) Farrer; (penalty missed) Santel

August 25, 1996 27	Los Angeles Galaxy	2–3	Dallas Burn	Pasadena, California
	Calichman (yellow card) 6'; Salcedo (yellow card) 31'; Hurtado 53', 80'	Recap	Soñora 23'; Kreis 32'; Dodd (yellow card) 73'; Washington 76'	Stadium: Rose Bowl; Attendance: 19,279; Referee: Kevin Terry

September 4, 1996 28	New England Revolution	2–1	Dallas Burn	Foxborough, Massachusetts
	Watson 35'; Moore (yellow card) 48', (goal) 78' (pen.); DeBrito (yellow card) 89'	Recap	Soñora (yellow card) 37'; Eck (yellow card) 68', (goal) 74'	Stadium: Foxboro Stadium; Attendance: 12,933; Referee: Robert Sheker

September 7, 1996 29	Dallas Burn	0–2	New England Revolution	Dallas, Texas
	Farrer (yellow card) 20'; Kreis (yellow card) 39'	Recap	Lalas (yellow card) 16'; Sawatzky 19'; Watson (yellow card) 22'; Baba 43'	Stadium: Cotton Bowl; Attendance: 18,582; Referee: Kevin Stott

September 11, 1996 30	San Jose Clash	2–2 (1–3 SO)	Dallas Burn	San Jose, California
	Espinoza 49'; Draguicevich (yellow card) 59' (yellow-red card) 84'; Iroha 74'	Recap	Haynes (yellow card) 55', (goal) 79'; Álvarez (yellow card) 56'; Kreis 87'	Stadium: Spartan Stadium; Attendance: 10,894; Referee: Frank Gorog
	Shootout
	Wynalda (penalty scored); Iroha (penalty missed); Baicher (penalty missed); Rodas (penalty missed)		(penalty missed) Lozzano; (penalty scored) Haynes; (penalty scored) Sanchez; (penalty missed) Ashton; (penalty scored) Farrer

September 19, 1996 31	Dallas Burn	1–2	Los Angeles Galaxy	Dallas, Texas
	Sanchez 23'; Kreis (yellow card) 29'; Álvarez (yellow card) 88'; Soñora (yellow card) 90'; Elliott (yellow card) 90'	Recap	Hurtado 11', (yellow card) 90'; Cienfuegos (yellow card) 24'; Vanney 48'; Salcedo (yellow card) 63'; Karapetyan (yellow card) 80'	Stadium: Cotton Bowl; Attendance: 12,569; Referee: Ali Saheli

September 22, 1996 32	Los Angeles Galaxy	2–1	Dallas Burn	Pasadena, California
	Noamouz 76'; Garvey 82'	Recap	Flores (yellow card) 10'; Cassar (yellow card) 85'; Eck 89'	Stadium: Rose Bowl; Attendance: 18,347; Referee: Joshua Patlak

== MLS Cup Playoffs ==
=== Western Conference semifinals ===
September 26, 1996 Game 1	Kansas City Wiz	3–2	Dallas Burn	Kansas City, Missouri
	Johnston 16'; McKeon 79'; Preki 89'	Recap	Elliott 21'; Ashton 25'; Soñora (yellow card) 57'; Álvarez (yellow card) 87'	Stadium: Arrowhead Stadium; Attendance: 4,466; Referee: Tim Weyland

September 29, 1996 Game 2	Dallas Burn	2–1	Kansas City Wiz	Dallas, Texas
	Kreis 5', (yellow card) 17'; Farrer (yellow card) 20'; Washington 32'	Recap	Preki 30'; Sorber (yellow card) 50'; Gutiérrez (yellow card) 70'	Stadium: Cotton Bowl; Attendance: 10,125; Referee: Esse Baharmast

October 2, 1996 Game 3	Dallas Burn	2–2 (2–3 SO)	Kansas City Wiz	Dallas, Texas
	Sanchez 27', (yellow card) 41'; Elliott 66'; Farrer (yellow card) 73'; Haynes (yellow card) 81'	Recap	Uderitz (yellow card) 22'; Preki (yellow card) 35'; Chung 41'; Takawira 62'	Stadium: Cotton Bowl; Attendance: 9,802; Referee: Rich Grady
	Shootout
	Haynes (penalty missed); Lozzano (penalty missed); Sánchez (penalty scored); Farrer (penalty scored); Ashton (penalty missed)		(penalty missed) Johnston; (penalty scored) Preki; (penalty scored) Klopas; (penalty scored) Wright; (penalty missed) Takawira

== U.S. Open Cup ==
September 16, 1996 Quarterfinal	Dallas Burn (Texas)	3–2	(Washington (state)) Seattle Sounders	Dallas, Texas
	Álvarez (yellow card) 54'; Lozzano 58'; Elliott 70'; Eck 79'	Report	Leonetti 3'; Hoggan 90' (pen.)	Stadium: Cotton Bowl; Attendance: 1,305; Referee: Kevin Terry

October 27, 1996 Semifinal	Dallas Burn (Texas)	0–2	(Washington, D.C.) D.C. United	Dallas, Texas
	Haynes (yellow card) 26'; Soehn (yellow card) 58'; Farrer (yellow card) 63'	Report	Moreno 12', 82'	Stadium: Cotton Bowl; Attendance: 1,958; Referee: Kevin Terry
