= Washington Rodríguez =

Washington Rodríguez may refer to:

- Washington Rodríguez (boxer) (1944–2014), Uruguayan boxer
- Washington Rodríguez (footballer) (born 1970), Uruguayan footballer

== See also ==
- Washington Rodrigues (born 1936), Brazilian radio sports broadcaster
