= Christopher Sullivan (soccer, born 1965) =

American soccer player, trainer, and sports broadcaster (born 1965)

Personal information
- Date of birth: April 18, 1965 (age 61)
- Place of birth: San Jose, California, United States
- Height: 6 ft 0 in (1.83 m)
- Positions: Midfielder; forward

College career
Years	Team	Apps	(Gls)
1983–1987	Tampa Spartans		

Senior career*
Years	Team	Apps	(Gls)
1987–1988	US Joué-lès-Tours		
1988–1989	Le Touquet AC		
1989	Orlando Lions		
1989–1990	Győri ETO FC	11	(1)
1990	Landskrona BoIS	6	(2)
1992	Brøndby IF	0	(0)
1992–1993	Hertha BSC	6	(0)
1994–1995	Yucatan		
1995	San Francisco Bay Diablos		
1996–1997	Győri ETO FC	5	(1)
1997	San Jose Clash	24	(2)

International career
1987–1992	United States	19	(2)
- * Club domestic league appearances and goals

Christopher Sullivan (born April 18, 1965) is an American retired soccer player and current trainer and sports broadcaster.

== Youth and college ==
Sullivan began playing soccer at a young age. When he was four he began playing with West Valley S.C. He attended and played soccer at NCAA Division II powerhouse University of Tampa. He was inducted into the University of Tampa Athletic Hall of Fame in October 2010. While playing for the University of Tampa, he earned a second-team Division II All American in 1986 and a first-team All American in 1987.

== Professional career ==
His professional career spanned two continents and seven countries. He began his career in France with lower division clubs US Joué-lès-Tours and Le Touquet. In 1989, he was back in the U.S. with the Orlando Lions of the American Soccer League. He then returned to Europe, signing with Hungary club Raba ETO before moving to Swedish club Landskrona BoIS, Danish club Brøndby IF and German club Hertha BSC. He also spent time with the Mexican lower division club Yucatan. In 1995, he played for the San Francisco Bay Diablos in the USISL. During this time, he twice left active playing for family reasons. On February 1, 1997, Major League Soccer allocated Sullivan to the San Jose Clash. He played the 1997 season with The Clash. On November 6, 1997, MLS held an Expansion Draft. The Clash did not protect Sullivan, but neither Chicago nor Miami selected him. Despite this, the Clash traded Sullivan to the Miami Fusion for the third-round draft pick two weeks later. He elected to retire rather than join the Fusion. However, he continued to play in the San Francisco Soccer Football League, including club El Farolito in 2003.

== National team ==
He made his US Men's National Team debut while still in college. In 1987, he came on for Brian Bliss in a Presidents Cup game against Egypt in South Korea. He was a member of the 1990 FIFA World Cup U.S. team. In 1992, he played his last game for the U.S. national team in a 1–0 loss to Brazil.

== Post-playing career ==
Since retiring from playing, Sullivan is now a soccer trainer but is probably more recognized for his soccer analyst work on television. He started as a sideline reporter for Fox Sports Bay Area covering the San Jose Earthquakes. He gained national exposure as a soccer analyst on Fox Soccer Channel's now defunct MLS Wrap. Sullivan's technical and tactical insight into the game, his encyclopedia-like recall of soccer history and his passionate delivery soon earned him a more permanent and prominent spot in the Fox Soccer Channel lineup.

He has served as the color commentator or analyst on countless Major League Soccer games as well as on the pre and post game shows for Fox Soccer Channel's Soccer Night in America featuring the Major League Soccer game of the week. Sullivan has worked virtually every level of game broadcast on Fox Soccer Channel in recent history including the FIFA Club World Cup, UEFA Champions League, UEFA Europa League, UEFA Super Cup, CONCACAF Champions League, United States Men's National Team games as well as Fox Soccer Channel's 2006 and 2010 FIFA World Cup previews. Sullivan has been an analyst for the last four World Cups. In 2014 Sullivan was the lead analyst for Yahoo Sports in Brazil and appeared on beIN Sports nightly shows from Rio de Janeiro. He covered the 2015 Copa America Chile and the 2016 Copa America Centenario in the U.S. for beIN Sports and worked as an in studio analyst for beIN Sports for both the 2017 Confederations Cup and 2018 FIFA World Cup Russia.

In 2022, Sullivan covered his 5th World Cup in Doha, Qatar for beIN Sports.
