= Washington Rodríguez (footballer) =

Uruguayan footballer (born 1970)

Washington Rodriguez
Personal information
- Full name: Washington Oscar Secco Rodriguez
- Date of birth: 12 January 1970 (age 56)
- Place of birth: Montevideo, Uruguay
- Height: 1.73 m (5 ft 8 in)
- Position: Midfielder

Youth career
- –1989: Liverpool Montevideo

Senior career*
Years	Team	Apps	(Gls)
1989–1995	Liverpool Montevideo	144	(27)
1996	Dallas Burn	14	(4)
1996	Benfica	0	(0)
1997	Liverpool Montevideo		
1997–1998	Nacional	25	(7)
1999–2003	Liverpool Montevideo	115	(11)

International career
1990	Uruguay U20		
1992	Uruguay U23		
- * Club domestic league appearances and goals

Washington Rodriguez (born 12 January 1970) is a former Uruguayan professional footballer who played as a midfielder in Uruguay and the United States.

== Career ==
Rodriguez played five seasons with Liverpool F.C. of the Uruguayan Primera División for five seasons before joining the Dallas Burn of the American Major League Soccer for their inaugural season in 1996. During his time with the Dallas Burn Rodriguez played in 14 matches and scored 4 goals in his only season with the club.
