= Altimont Butler =

Jamaican footballer (born 1968)

Freddie Butler
Personal information
- Full name: Altimont Butler
- Date of birth: 21 July 1968 (age 58)
- Place of birth: Kingston, Jamaica
- Height: 1.77 m (5 ft 10 in)
- Position: Midfielder

College career
Years	Team	Apps	(Gls)
1990–1993	Southern New Hampshire	79	(30)

Senior career*
Years	Team	Apps	(Gls)
1984–1987	Harbour View		
1988–1990	L'Etoile		
1994–1995	Torreense	3	(0)
1995–1996	Brest	2	(0)
1996	North Jersey Imperials	10	(1)
1996	San Jose Clash	14	(2)
1997	Columbus Crew	1	(0)
1998	Cleveland Crunch (indoor)	4	(0)
1998	New Hampshire Phantoms		(3)

International career
1985–1998	Jamaica	69	(12)

Managerial career
- 2000–2005: New Jersey Dynamos
- 2005–2006: Jersey Crew Reggae Boyz
- 2007–2010: Oratory Preparatory School
- 2007–2012: Sogndal FC (U19 / Reserve Team Head Coach)
- 2012 – present: Cedar Stars Academy
- 2015 – present: Jamaica U20 (assistant coach)
- * Club domestic league appearances and goals

Altimont "Freddie" Butler (born 21 July 1968) is a Jamaican former professional footballer who played as a striker.

== Youth career ==
Butler was born in Kingston, Jamaica. His youth career began at age 12 with the Golden Star in Port Royal. During the next three years, he had played in the President's Cup, Minor League and Sid Bartlett League. When he was fourteen, Butler left Port Royal All Age School for Dunoon Technical High School, where he played for the school's football team for three years.

When he was seventeen, Butler began his career with Harbour View. During a tournament in Guadeloupe, L'Etoile spotted Butler and signed him to a contract when he was nineteen. In 1990, Butler entered Southern New Hampshire University (then known as New Hampshire College) where he played with the men's soccer team from 1990 to 1993. He received All-Americana recognition three times, twice as a first team (1992 and 1993). Butler graduated in 1994 with a bachelor's degree in sociology and a minor in computer information. In 2001, he was inducted in the SNHU Penmen Hall of Fame.

== Professional career ==
Following graduation, he moved to Portugal where he spent a single season with Torreense. In 1995, he moved to French club Stade Brest. He also spent time with the North Jersey Imperials of the USISL.

In February 1996, the San Jose Clash of Major League Soccer (MLS) drafted Butler in the second round (eighteenth overall) of the league's Inaugural Player Draft. He spent the 1996 season in San Jose before being traded to the Columbus Crew for Mac Cozier on 6 November 1996. After appearing in only one game, scoring one goal, for the Crew, Butler left the team to concentrate on his national team commitments in the lead up to the 1998 FIFA World Cup.

On 11 March 1998, Butler signed a one-year contract with the Cleveland Crunch of the National Professional Soccer League (NPSL). He played four games at the end of the 1997–1998 season, then retired.

Since then, Butler has worked as a coach and scout while playing amateur and semi-professionally.

== International career ==
In 1985, Butler started his career with the Jamaica national football team. He went on to earn 69 caps, scoring twelve goals. He also played for the Jamaican youth football team. When the national team qualified for the 1998 World Cup, manager Renê Simões dropped Butler from the team before the tournament for two reasons. First, he was injured several months before the game and second, Butler publicly complained when Simões said he intended to replace several players who had played during the qualification process with better players.

== Coaching career ==
Butler coached with the New Jersey Dynamos Soccer Club from 2000 to 2005. Butler currently coaches a MAPS Boys team for the New Jersey Crew Soccer Club aptly named the Jersey Crew Reggae Boyz. His boys team won the US Club State Cup in 2006.

In 2007, Butler was named the head soccer coach at Oratory Preparatory School in Summit, New Jersey. Butler coached the team to an 11–6 season and their first appearance in the NJSIAA State Championships since the 1990s.

In 2010, he accepted the head coaching position of the U19 team and Sogndal FC in Norway. Today Butler is the head of player development and the head coach of the reserve team at sogndal football club in Norway.

Currently in 2012–13 season, Butler is the youth director of boys soccer club Cedar Stars Academy in New Jersey. He leads their U13 boys team to become 1st in the state and 1st in the nation only to become higher. Winning the Manhattan Kickoff Classic, Jefferson Cup, and DTS Winter Invitational. As well as the EDP Cup in the fall of 2013. In December 2015, Butler was named as an assistant coach for the Jamaica u20 national team.
