= Zico (footballer, born 1966) =

Brazilian football manager and former player

Milton Antonio Nunes Niemet (born November 13, 1966), known as Zico, is a Brazilian football manager and former player. A forward, he came from Brazil to Mexican football in the middle of the 1991–92 season for Puebla. He started in the youth team of the Flamengo Club.
