= Tom Liner =

American soccer player and coach

Personal information
- Date of birth: November 27, 1970 (age 55)
- Place of birth: Redwood City, California, United States
- Height: 6 ft 0 in (1.83 m)
- Position: Goalkeeper

Youth career
- 1988–1991: Chico State

Senior career*
Years	Team	Apps	(Gls)
1991–1992	S.K. Kallein		
1994	Reno Rattlers		
1994–1996	P.S.V. Schwartz Weiss		
1996–1997	San Jose Clash	22	(0)

Managerial career
- 1992–1994: Chico State (assistant)
- 1997–: Foothill College
- * Club domestic league appearances and goals

Tom Liner (born November 27, 1970, in Redwood City, California) is a former U.S. soccer goalkeeper who currently coaches the Foothill College men's soccer team. He played two seasons in Major League Soccer with the San Jose Clash as well as in the USISL and lower Austrian divisions.

Liner grew up in San Carlos, California and attended Sequoia High School where he played both soccer and tennis. He went on to play soccer at California State University, Chico from 1988 to 1991. He holds the school record for career shut outs with 22 and career goalkeeping victories with 30. In 1991, he moved to Austria where he signed with third division S.K. Kallein, based out of Salzburg. After one season, he returned to the United States, where he served as an assistant coach at Chico State. In the summer of 1994, he played for the expansion Reno Rattlers in the USISL in addition to coaching at Chico and Sacred Heart Preparatory in Atherton, California. That fall he received an offer to play for P.S.V. Schwartz Weiss in the Austrian second division. Liner would remain in Austria for the next two years. In February 1996 the San Jose Clash selected Liner in the fourteenth round (138th overall) of the 1996 MLS Inaugural Player Draft. That season, he was the Clash starting goalkeeper, playing twenty games with a 1.73 goals against average. Injuries reduced his playing time in 1997 to two games. He retired from playing professionally at the end of the season and was immediately hired as the head coach of the Foothill College women's soccer team. From 2007 he has coached the Foothill Men's soccer team.
