= Missael Espinoza =

Mexican footballer (born 1965)

Personal information
- Full name: Eduardo Missael Espinoza Padilla
- Date of birth: 12 April 1965 (age 61)
- Place of birth: Tepic, Nayarit, Mexico
- Height: 1.81 m (5 ft 11 1/2 in)
- Position: Midfielder

Senior career*
Years	Team	Apps	(Gls)
1984–1993	Monterrey	193	(23)
1993–1997	Guadalajara	104	(30)
1996	→ San Jose Clash (loan)	26	(10)
1997–2002	León	107	(19)
1998–1999	→ Necaxa (loan)	23	(1)
2002–2003	Querétaro	36	(4)
2004–2005	Monterrey	4	(0)
Total		493	(87)

International career
1990–1995	Mexico	41	(4)
- * Club domestic league appearances and goals

Eduardo Missael Espinoza Padilla (born 12 April 1965) is a Mexican former professional footballer who played as a midfielder.

== Club career ==
A versatile player capable of lining up in the attack or on the right side of midfield, Espinoza began his career with Monterrey during the 1984–85 season. He participated with the Monterrey team that won the shortened Mexico 86 championship, becoming a frequent starter two seasons later and remaining with the club through 1993. Espinoza then joined Chivas, coming back from a serious injury that sidelined him for much of 1993, and scored a career-high 14 goals in 1994–95. In 1996, he signed with the San Jose Clash of the newly formed Major League Soccer, scoring 10 goals and winning honors as the club's most valuable player. Returning to Mexico with Chivas, he filled the role of a designated substitute as the club won the Verano 1997 title. He moved to León, finishing as runner-up to Cruz Azul in the Invierno 1997 tournament, then joined Necaxa to win the Invierno 1998 competition. He returned to León in 2000, transferred Querétaro upon the 2002 relegation of León, and closed his top-flight career with his original club Monterrey in 2005 at the age of 40.

== International career ==
Espinoza also obtained a total number of 41 caps and 4 goals for the Mexico national team between 1990 and 1995. His first cap came in a 2–0 victory over Colombia on April 17, 1990. He later represented Mexico at the inaugural CONCACAF Gold Cup of 1991, playing all five matches, and appeared in six qualifying matches for the 1994 FIFA World Cup under the direction of César Luis Menotti. Espinoza made the final squad for the World Cup, albeit without playing a game in the competition. He was also selected for Miguel Mejía Baron's 22-man squad at the 1995 Copa América, which was the final major event of his international career. His last cap came in a penalty-kick defeat in the Copa América quarterfinal against the United States on July 17, 1995.

List of international goals scored by Misael Espinoza
No.	Date	Venue	Opponent	Score	Result	Competition	Ref.
1	12 March 1991	Los Angeles Memorial Coliseum, Los Angeles, United States	United States	2–1	2–2	Friendly	
2	9 April 1991	Estadio Luis Pirata Fuente, Veracruz, Mexico	Chile	1–0	1–0	Friendly	
3	19 August 1992	Vasil Levski National Stadium, Sofia, Bulgaria	Bulgaria	1–0	1–1	Friendly	
4	9 July 1995	Estadio Domingo Burgueño, Maldonado, Uruguay	Venezuela	3–1	3–1	1995 Copa America	

== Honours ==
Monterrey

- Mexican Primera División: Mexico 1986
- Copa México: 1991–92
- CONCACAF Cup Winners Cup: 1993

Guadalajara

- Mexican Primera División: Verano 1997

Necaxa

- Mexican Primera División: Invierno 1998
