= Curt Onalfo =

American former soccer player and coach (born 1969)

Personal information
- Full name: Curt Onalfo
- Date of birth: November 19, 1969 (age 56)
- Place of birth: São Paulo, Brazil
- Height: 6 ft 2 in (1.88 m)
- Position: Defender

Youth career
- 1987–1990: Virginia Cavaliers

Senior career*
Years	Team	Apps	(Gls)
1991–1992	La Ciotat		
1994–1995	Connecticut Wolves		
1995–1996	Los Angeles Galaxy	13	(0)
1995	→ Tampico Madero (loan)		
1997	San Jose Clash	6	(0)
1998–1999	D.C. United	4	(0)
1998	→ MLS Pro 40 (loan)	2	(0)
1999	→ Maryland Mania (loan)	1	(0)
1999	→ MLS Pro 40 (loan)	2	(0)
1999	→ Mariners (loan)	2	(0)

International career
1989	United States U20		
1992	United States U23		
1988	United States	1	(0)

Managerial career
- 2000–2002: D.C. United (assistant)
- 2001: D.C. United (interim)
- 2002: United States U23 (assistant)
- 2003–2007: United States (assistant)
- 2007–2009: Kansas City Wizards
- 2010: D.C. United
- 2011–2014: LA Galaxy (assistant)
- 2014–2016: LA Galaxy II
- 2017: LA Galaxy
- * Club domestic league appearances and goals

Curt Onalfo (born November 19, 1969) is a former soccer player and coach who currently serves as Senior Vice President of Soccer Operations for the Major League Soccer club New England Revolution.

As a player, he played two seasons in France, two in the USISL, one in Mexico and four in Major League Soccer, achieving his most success with the Los Angeles Galaxy and D.C. United. Born in Brazil, he earned one cap with the United States national team.

He has an extensive coaching résumé, having served as head coach of three MLS clubs. Following a five-game losing streak with the Galaxy, Onalfo was removed from his role as head coach of the team on July 27, 2017.

== Youth and amateur ==
Onalfo was born in São Paulo, Brazil, but grew up in the United States in Ridgefield, Connecticut, and played high school soccer at Ridgefield High School. He went on to play four years of college soccer at the University of Virginia under Bruce Arena - an association that would serve him well in his later coaching career.

== Playing career ==
=== Professional ===
His first experience abroad came at La Ciotat, in the French fifth division, but a six-month battle with Hodgkin's Disease in 1993 disrupted his career and almost ended his life. After extensive chemotherapy, the cancer went into remission and Onalfo recovered, going on to play for the Connecticut Wolves of the USISL in 1994 and 1995. In 1995, he signed with Major League Soccer which was planning to begin its first season that year. When the league was forced to delay its first season until 1996, the league sent Onalfo on loan with Tampico Madero of the Mexican second division. He met and married his wife in Tampico and his family still maintain a home there; Onalfo also speaks fluent Spanish. In February 1996, the Los Angeles Galaxy selected Onalfo in the eight round (seventy-fourth overall) in the inaugural draft. He would feature in almost half of the Galaxy's games that year, as well as the first MLS Cup. He went on to play for the San Jose Clash (later the Earthquakes) in the next season, and then for D.C. United in 1998 and 1999, winning the MLS Cup with United in his last year. In 1999, United sent Onalfo on loan to MLS Pro 40, Virginia Beach Mariners and Maryland Mania.

=== International ===
In the late 80s and early 90s, Onalfo featured for the U.S. national teams on both youth and senior levels, co-captaining the U.S. U-20 national team at the 1989 FIFA World Youth Championship, the gold medal-winning team of the 1991 Pan American Games, and also the U.S. squad at the 1992 Summer Olympics. In sum, he played over 100 games for the United States at various levels, though he was capped only once for the senior team. That cap came in a 1–0 victory over Costa Rica on June 14, 1988.

== Coaching career ==
After retiring, Onalfo continued to work with youth soccer in training, coaching, and technical director roles, as he had done throughout his playing days – for McLean Youth Soccer in Virginia, various teams in Ridgefield, CT, and for his own company, Curt Onalfo Soccer.

His first managerial job in professional soccer came when he was hired as assistant coach to Thomas Rongen – later replaced by Ray Hudson – at D.C. United, a position he occupied from 2001 through 2002. In the latter year, Onalfo left to become an assistant to Bruce Arena during the 2002–2006 stretch of Arena's tenure as coach of the U.S. national team. In 2005, Onalfo was included among the final three candidates for the top job at the Colorado Rapids, eventually being passed over for Fernando Clavijo.

In November 2006, Onalfo was appointed as head coach of the Kansas City Wizards, replacing interim coach Brian Bliss. He pledged to install an attacking style as a coach for the Wizards, who had finished poorly in their previous season and failed to make the playoffs. Wizards technical director Peter Vermes cited Onalfo's skill as a communicator, leadership, scouting, and talent evaluation in announcing the hire.

With the Wizards in sixth place in MLS's Eastern Conference with a 5–6–7 record and coming off a 6–0 road loss to FC Dallas two nights earlier, Onalfo was dismissed on August 3, 2009. He finished with a 27–29–22 record with the club.

He was hired as the head coach of D.C. United in December 2009. On August 4, 2010, after D.C. United started the season with a record of 3–12–3, Onalfo was dismissed as head coach of D.C. United.

On January 27, 2011, Onalfo was named assistant coach for the Los Angeles Galaxy, reuniting with head coach Bruce Arena, with whom he formerly coached for the U.S. National Team and played for at D.C. United in 1998. He was also named head coach of the Galaxy's reserve team the same day. Onalfo continued serving as reserve coach when the reserve team entered the United Soccer League as a full club. Following the departure of Arena to coach the United States national team, Onalfo was promoted to first team head coach for the 2017 season. However, once again, this tenure lasted less than a full season, with Onalfo being fired on July 27, 2017, after a 6-10-4 record.

On June 2, 2019, Onalfo was named as technical director of New England Revolution. He served as the interim sporting director during the suspension of Bruce Arena on July 30, 2023, and continued to serve in this role after Arena's resignation on September 9. On November 30, Onalfo was named the permanent sporting director.

On June 29, 2026, Onalfo was promoted to the role of Senior Vice President of Soccer Operations for the New England Revolution, a newly created position.

== Personal life ==
Onalfo has two children. Curt's son Christian also became a soccer player. In 2015, Christian Onalfo was called up to the U.S. under-20 national team.
