= Tayt Ianni =

American soccer player (born 1971)

Personal information
- Full name: Tayt Ianni
- Date of birth: December 6, 1971 (age 54)
- Place of birth: Lodi, California, US
- Height: 5 ft 8 in (1.73 m)
- Position: Defender

Youth career
- 1990–1993: UCLA

Senior career*
Years	Team	Apps	(Gls)
1994	East Los Angeles Cobras		
1994–1995	TuS Celle		
1995	Monterey Bay Jaguars		
1995–1996	Rajpracha		
1996	Tampa Bay Mutiny	0	(0)
1996–1997	San Jose Clash	7	(0)
1997–2000	Orange County Zodiac		

International career^{‡}
1996	United States	1	(0)
- * Club domestic league appearances and goals as of 16 March 2007 ‡ National team caps and goals as of 9 June 2007

Tayt Ianni (born December 6, 1971, in Lodi, California) is a former U.S. soccer defender.

== Career ==
=== College ===
Ianni grew up in Lodi, California, and attended Lodi High School where he was a two time Parade Magazine high school All-American soccer player. After high school, Ianni attended UCLA where he played on the men's soccer team from 1990 to 1993. He started eighty-two games during his four seasons with the Bruins, and was the team captain his senior year. His freshman year, the Bruins won the NCAA championship.

=== Professional ===
In 1994, Ianni signed with the East Los Angeles Cobras of USISL. He then moved to German Third Division (Regionalliga) club TuS Celle for the 1994–1995 season. He returned to the United States in 1995 and joined the Monterey Bay Jaguars for the last month of the 1995 USISL regular season. The Jaguars won the Divisional title, to advance to the Sizzlin’ Nine tournament. At the end of the USISL season, he moved to Thailand where he signed with First Division club Rajpracha-UCOM. He spent the 1995–1996 season in Thailand and played with Raj Pracha FC in the Asian Cup Winners Cup. In February 1996, the Tampa Bay Mutiny of Major League Soccer (MLS) picked Ianni in the eighth round (seventy-seventh overall) of the Inaugural MLS Draft. Ianni joined the Mutiny on the completion of the Thai season, appearing in several pre-season MLS games. Ianni made his first MLS start July 31, 1996, against the New England Revolution at right back. However, the Mutiny waived him on July 1, 1996, and the next day, the San Jose Clash claimed him off waivers. Over the course of the 1996 season, Ianni played in ten games and scored one goal with the Clash. The Clash waived Ianni on May 18, 1997. After being released by the Clash, Ianni joined the Orange County Zodiac for the 1997 season. Then, that fall, he moved to Japan to play professional beach soccer. In February 1998, the Colorado Rapids selected Ianni in the third round (35th overall) of the MLS Supplemental Draft However, they never signed him to a contract. Instead, he continued to play for the Zodiacs through the 2000 season. That year, they club was renamed the Orange County Waves.

=== International ===
In 1988, Ianni played five games with the U.S. U-18 national team. The next two years, he was part of the U.S. U-20 team which qualified for the 1991 U-20 FIFA World Championship, but he did not play in that tournament. From 1992 to 1994, he played several games with the U.S. National "B" Team. Ianni earned his only cap with the U.S. national team in a 4–1 loss to Peru on October 16, 1996. Ianni, along with several teammates in the game, was called up when the regular national team players went on strike and refused to play.

== Personal life ==
Ianni now works as a mortgage broker for Nation's Funding Limited in Newport Beach, California. He married his wife Nicole, the daughter of former UCLA football coach Terry Donahue, in 1996 and has three children. His brother Patrick also played soccer in Major League Soccer and for the United States under-23 men's national soccer team.
