= Jorge Rodas =

Guatemalan footballer

Personal information
- Full name: Jorge Alexander Rodas Hurtarte
- Date of birth: 9 October 1971 (age 55)
- Place of birth: Jalapa, Guatemala
- Height: 1.79 m (5 ft 10 in)
- Position: Midfielder

Senior career*
Years	Team	Apps	(Gls)
1992–1994	Municipal		
1994–1996	Comunicaciones		
1996	San Jose Clash	29	(1)
1997–2002	Comunicaciones		
2002–2003	Xelajú MC		
2004–2006	Deportivo Jalapa		
2007	Deportivo Mixco		
2007–2008	Aurora		

International career^{‡}
1991–2001	Guatemala	38	(4)
- * Club domestic league appearances and goals as of 13 March 2010 ‡ National team caps and goals as of 13 March 2010

Jorge Alexander Rodas Hurtarte (born October 9, 1971) is a Guatemalan former professional football midfielder. He last played for Aurora F.C. in the Guatemalan Primera División as of the end of the 2007-08 season.

Rodas was the first Guatemalan footballer to play in Major League Soccer, when he starred for San José Clash in 1996. He was also a member of the Guatemala national team.

He is the younger brother of Julio Rodas, who was also a member of the national team.

== Club career ==
Rodas began playing professionally for Municipal of Guatemala City, where he became first known for his abilities as a central midfielder and his shooting range. After winning the 1993-94 league tournament with Municipal, he signed with their arch-rival, Comunicaciones, where he would be part of seven championship-winning squads.

=== Major League Soccer ===
In 1996, Rodas became the first Guatemalan to play professionally in the United States, when he was signed by San Jose Clash. He took the field in the first-ever Major League Soccer match on April 6. 1996, when The Clash beat D.C. United 1-0 at home. Alongside players like Eric Wynalda, John Doyle, and Eddie Lewis, Rodas helped San Jose reach the MLS playoffs that year. He played in 29 matches, made three assists, and scored one goal on a direct free kick against New England Revolution on August 11, catalogued in the San Jose Earthquakes 100 Greatest Goals DVD as the team's second-best goal of the year. After the inaugural MLS season, Rodas was transferred back to Communicaciones in January 1997.

=== Later career ===
Rodas would stay at Comunicaciones until 2002, and after that he played briefly for Xelajú MC. Later, he joined Deportivo Jalapa, achieving further success by helping the team win the Domestic Cup in consecutive years in 2005 and 2006; he scored the only goal of a 1-0 win over Municipal in the 2006 final. He had other notable individual performances at Jalapa, among them scoring a hat-trick against Deportivo Heredia in a 3-2 win on which the team advanced to the semi-final of the 2005 apertura tournament.

After his tenure with Jalapa ended in 2006, Rodas, aged 35, continued his career with a brief spell with Deportivo Mixco in the Primera División. For the 2007-08 season, he was signed by former top-division team Aurora F.C., which had been relegated to the Segunda División the previous season. Aurora earned promotion back to the Primera División for the 2008–2009 season.

== International career ==
Rodas made his debut for Guatemala in a May 1991 UNCAF Nations Cup match against El Salvador alongside his brother Julio. Jorge Rodas earned 38 overall caps, scoring four goals, and represented his country in 12 FIFA World Cup qualification matches and was part of the squads that competed at the CONCACAF Gold Cup tournaments of 1996 and 2000, and at the UNCAF Nations Cup of 1995, 1997, and 1999. His final international was a January 2001 World Cup qualification match against Costa Rica.

== Career statistics ==
=== International goals ===
Scores and results list. Guatemala's goal tally first.

#	Date	Venue	Opponent	Score	Result	Competition
1	7 December 1995	Estadio De la Flor Blanca, San Salvador, El Salvador	El Salvador	1–0	1–0	UNCAF Nations Cup 1995
2	7 March 1999	Estadio Mateo Flores, Guatemala City, Guatemala	Jamaica	1–4	2–4	Copa de la Paz
3	7 March 1999	Estadio Mateo Flores, Guatemala City, Guatemala	Jamaica	2–4	2–4	Copa de la Paz
4	7 July 2000	Los Angeles Memorial Coliseum, Los Angeles, USA	El Salvador	1–0	1–0	Friendly match

== See also ==
- List of foreign MLS players
