= Benedict Iroha =

Nigerian footballer

Personal information
- Date of birth: 29 November 1969 (age 56)
- Place of birth: Aba, Nigeria
- Height: 1.73 m (5 ft 8 in)
- Positions: Left-back; left midfielder

Senior career*
Years	Team	Apps	(Gls)
1989	Bendel Insurance	Falcons FC, Aba	
1985	Iwuanyanwu Nationale		
1991–1992	ASEC Mimosas	?	(?)
1992–1996	Vitesse Arnhem	21	(1)
1996–1997	San Jose Clash	33	(2)
1997	D.C. United	17	(4)
1997–1998	Elche	1	(0)
1998–2000	Watford	10	(0)
Total		82	(7)

International career
1990–1998	Nigeria	50	(1)

Managerial career
- 2000–2006: FC Dallas (Youth Coach)
- 2007: Nigeria U-17 (assistant coach)
- 2007–2008: Dolphins FC
- 2009–2010: Heartland F.C. (Chief Trainer)
- * Club domestic league appearances and goals

Benedict "Ben" Iroha (born 29 November 1969) is a Nigerian former professional association football player who played as a left-back or left midfielder.

== Career ==
Iroha started his career in Nigeria, scoring the first ever goal in the newly professional Nigerian league in 1990 for Iwuanyanwu Nationale, who went on to win the league that year.

Iroha was originally a midfielder before national coach Clemens Westerhof converted him to play left back. His club career in Europe was largely unsuccessful, and Iroha was allocated to San Jose Clash in 1996. Iroha ended up playing in the inaugural MLS match against D.C. United, and is credited with the league's first-ever assist. The next season, he was traded to D.C. United, where he won the league title but was dropped to comply with salary restrictions. He entered negotiations with the team to re-sign his contract, but they were halted after Iroha was called up to the World Cup squad for Nigeria. After a move to Spanish side Elche CF in 1997, he moved to Watford in December 1998, playing ten games for the Hertfordshire side. A problem with bunions forced him to the sidelines, and he retired in March 2000.

== International career ==
Playing for the Nigerian national team, he featured in the 1994 FIFA World Cup and the 1998 FIFA World Cup as well as when they won the 1994 African Nations Cup. At the Nations Cup, he scored his only goal for Nigeria in the semifinals against Côte d'Ivoire. At the 1994 World Cup, he played Nigeria's very first World Cup game against Bulgaria, which Nigeria won 3−0, but suffered an injury in that game and was subsequently replaced by Michael Emenalo for the remainder of Nigeria's tournament, which ended in a 2−1 defeat to Italy in the round of 16.

== Coaching career ==
After retiring, he returned to the US to coach in the youth department of FC Dallas. Most recently, he was an assistant with the Nigerian U-17 team that won the 2007 FIFA U-17 World Cup and head coach of Nigeria's Dolphins FC. Iroha is on the staff of Heartland of Owerri.
