= Michael Emenalo =

Nigerian footballer

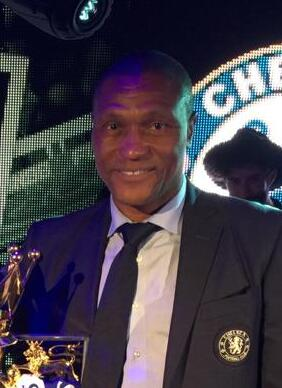

Personal information
- Full name: Michael Emenalo
- Date of birth: 14 July 1965 (age 61)
- Place of birth: Aba, Abia, Nigeria
- Height: 1.85 m (6 ft 1 in)
- Position: Left-back

College career
Years	Team	Apps	(Gls)
1985–1988	Boston Terriers		(36)

Senior career*
Years	Team	Apps	(Gls)
1985	Enugu Rangers		
1989–1993	RWD Molenbeek	47	(5)
1993–1994	Eintracht Trier		
1994–1995	Notts County	7	(0)
1996–1997	San Jose Clash	56	(1)
1997–1998	Lleida	22	(1)
1998–2000	Maccabi Tel Aviv	43	(0)
Total		175	(7)

International career
1985–1995	Nigeria	14	(0)

Managerial career
- 2010–2011: Chelsea (assistant)
- * Club domestic league appearances and goals

Michael Emenalo (born 14 July 1965) is a Nigerian football executive and former coach and player who played as a left-back. He is the director of football for the Saudi Pro League.

He is the former director of football of Premier League club Chelsea and Ligue 1 side Monaco.

== Playing career ==
Emenalo began his career in his native Nigeria before moving to the United States, where he attended college at and played for Boston University, from 1985 to 1988. He played for Molenbeek in Belgium. In the winter of 1993, Emenalo completed a trial training session at SV Prüm, but a contract was not signed. Eintracht Trier in Germany, and Notts County F.C in England followed, before going back to the US. Emenalo was part of the original allocated players for Major League Soccer and spent two seasons (1996–97) with the San Jose Clash. After that, he played with UE Lleida in Spain and Maccabi Tel Aviv in Israel.

Emenalo won 14 caps for Nigeria and played in the 1994 FIFA World Cup as the backup to starting left back Ben Iroha. After Iroha picked up an injury in Nigeria's first game against Bulgaria, Emenalo subsequently replaced him at left back for the remainder of Nigeria's run in the tournament against Argentina, Greece, and Italy.

== Technical director ==
Emenalo became director of player development at the Tucson Soccer Academy in the US in 2006, before joining the coaching staff at Chelsea when former manager Avram Grant was in charge in 2007. After the departure of Ray Wilkins, Emenalo was promoted from his position as chief scout to assistant first team coach on 18 November 2010. On 8 July 2011, Chelsea appointed Emenalo as Technical Director of the club. He completely restructured the club's academy, scouting, loan and women's team setups, and is credited as a key figure behind the club's success having overseen the scouting and transfers of key players including Juan Mata, Thibaut Courtois, Kevin De Bruyne, Mohamed Salah, N'Golo Kanté, Eden Hazard, and Cesc Fàbregas. He has been credited by numerous sources as being the driving force behind Chelsea's most influential signings. He has also been credited for the development of the Chelsea Football Club Academy (CFC Academy) as well as the recent resurgence of the Chelsea Football Club Women's Team.

On 10 June 2013, Emenalo requested that his contract be terminated "to facilitate the return of José Mourinho", but his request was denied.

On 6 November 2017, he resigned as technical director of the club, and at the end of that month joined Monaco as its sporting director. On 12 August 2019, Emenalo left Monaco by mutual consent.

On 12 July 2023, The Athletic reported that Emenalo would become the first director of football of the Saudi Pro League.

== Personal life ==
Emenalo's son, Landon, is currently a player at Chelsea academy.

== Honours ==
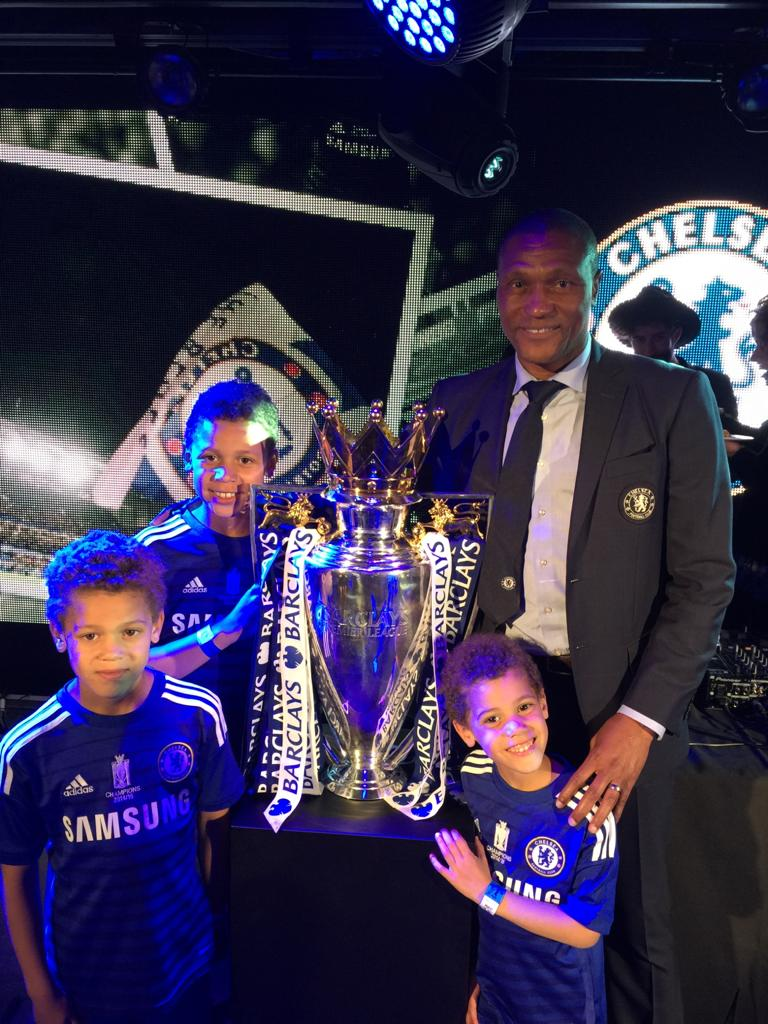
Michael Emenalo celebrates winning the Premier League with his children

Chelsea

- Premier League: 2009–10, 2014–15, 2016–17
- FA Cup: 2008–09, 2009–10, 2011–12, 2017–18
- Football League Cup / EFL Cup: 2014–15
- UEFA Champions League: 2011–12
- UEFA Europa League: 2012–13
