= Lawrence Lozzano =

American soccer player (born 1970)

Personal information
- Date of birth: July 25, 1970 (age 56)
- Place of birth: Los Angeles, California, United States
- Height: 6 ft 1 in (1.85 m)
- Positions: Forward; midfielder; defender

Senior career*
Years	Team	Apps	(Gls)
1990	California Emperors		
1991–1992	San Francisco Bay Blackhawks	17	(2)
1993–1994	Los Angeles Salsa		
1995	Tampico		
1996	Dallas Burn	34	(2)
1997–1998	San Jose Clash	41	(14)
1998–1999	Los Angeles Galaxy	7	(0)
1999	→ MLS Pro 40 (loan)	2	(0)
1999	MetroStars	13	(1)

International career
1994–1996	United States	7	(0)
- * Club domestic league appearances and goals

Lawrence Lozzano (born July 25, 1970) is an American former professional soccer player who earned seven caps with the United States national team.

== Club career ==
Born in Los Angeles, California, Lozzano grew up in Cerritos, California playing for several youth clubs, at least one of which was coached by Luis Balboa, father of Marcelo Balboa. In 1990, Lozzano played with the California Emperors of the American Professional Soccer League (APSL). The Kickers folded at the end of the 1990 season and Lozzano moved to the San Francisco Bay Blackhawks for the 1991 and 1992 season. In 1991, they won the APSL championship and in 1992 went to the semifinals of the CONCACAF Champions Cup The Blackhawks dropped a division at the end of the 1992 season and Lozzano jumped to the expansion Los Angeles Salsa. The Salsa went to the 1993 APSL championship game, but folded at the end of the 1994 season. In 1995, Lozzano played for Tampico in México Primera División A (Second Division). He scored for Tampico in the first and second rounds of the 1995–96 Copa México. Lozzano led the team in scoring. In February 1996, the Dallas Burn of Major League Soccer (MLS) selected Lozzano in the third round (23rd overall) of the Inaugural Player Draft. Lozzano played in thirty-one regular season and three playoff games as a defender, scoring only two goals before being released by the team on October 16, 1996. The San Jose Clash picked up Lozzano and he spent the next two seasons in San Jose playing as a forward before being traded to the Los Angeles Galaxy for Harut Karapetyan on August 7, 1998. In 1997, he scored ten goals and picked up ten assists. He began the 1999 season with the Galaxy before being waived on June 16, 1999. The MetroStars picked up Lozzano off waivers the next day and he appeared in thirteen games, scoring a single goal in his last game with the team. He was waived by the MetroStars on February 21, 2000.

== International career ==
Lozzano earned his first cap with the United States national team in a 2–1 loss to Saudi Arabia on October 19, 1994, being replaced by Maurice Ligeon in the 72nd minute. He played several games through the end of 1994 and the first two games in 1995. However, he did not play again until his last cap on October 16, 1996, in a 4–1 loss to Peru.
