= Oscar Draguicevich =

American retired soccer player

Personal information
- Date of birth: August 19, 1969 (age 57)
- Place of birth: Pflugerville, Texas, U.S.
- Height: 6 ft 1 in (1.85 m)
- Position: Defender

Youth career
- University of North Texas

Senior career*
Years	Team	Apps	(Gls)
1990	Orlando Lions		
1990–1991	Detroit Rockers (indoor)		
1991–1994	SC Norderstedt		
1994	Detroit Neon (indoor)	27	(17)
1994–1996	Cleveland Crunch (indoor)	69	(40)
1996–1998	San Jose Clash	45	(4)
1997	→ Seattle Sounders (loan)	2	(0)
1998	→ San Francisco Bay Seals (loan)	1	(0)
1998–2000	Cleveland Crunch (indoor)	46	(11)

International career
1989	U.S. U-20		
1996–1999	U.S. Futsal		
- * Club domestic league appearances and goals

Oscar Draguicevich II (born August 19, 1969) is an American retired soccer player who spent three seasons in Major League Soccer. He also played in the American Professional Soccer League, Continental Indoor Soccer League, National Professional Soccer League and the German third division. He was a member of the United States U-20 national team at the 1989 FIFA World Youth Championship.

== Youth ==
Draguicevich attended the University of North Texas. In 1989, he was a member of the U.S. U-20 national team which placed fourth at the 1989 FIFA World Youth Championship. He later earned three caps with the U.S. national futsal team between 1996 and 1999 representing the US national futsal team. He was a member of the U.S. team which competed at the 1996 FIFA Futsal World Cup. During high school, Draguicevich also served as a locker room attendant for the Dallas Sidekicks during the 1986–1987 season.

== Professional ==
In 1990, he began his professional career with the Orlando Lions in the American Professional Soccer League. That fall, he signed with the Detroit Rockers in the National Professional Soccer League (NPSL) where he was elected to the All-Star Team. In 1991, he moved to Germany where he spent three seasons with SC Norderstedt. In 1994, he returned to the United States where he spent the summer playing for the Detroit Neon of the Continental Indoor Soccer League. In the fall of 1994, he signed with the Cleveland Crunch of the NPSL where he won his first of two Championships. On February 7, 1996, the San Jose Clash selected Draguicevich in the eleventh round (108th overall) in the 1996 MLS Inaugural Player Draft. Over three seasons, he played forty-five games for the Clash and scoring 4 goals. In August 1997, he played two games on loan with the Seattle Sounders of the USISL in August 1997. After his final year in Major League Soccer, Draguicevich returned to the Cleveland Crunch. He remained with the team through the end of the 1999–2000 season, retired on August 24, 2000. He currently works with his brother Marcelo in their company, Laser Manufacturing in their hometown of Pfugerville, Texas.

== Personal life ==
Oscar's son, Oscar Draguicevech III, is an American football kicker. He played college football at Incarnate Word and Washington State where he still holds the record for longest punt average. He was signed by the Carolina Panthers after going undrafted in the 2021 NFL draft.
