= 1998 Columbus Crew season =

Columbus Crew
1998 season
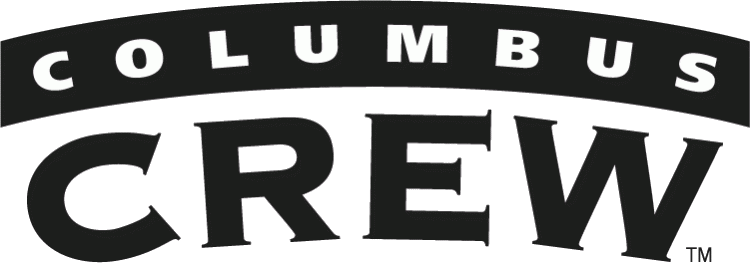
- Investor-operators: Lamar Hunt; Clark Hunt; Dan Hunt; Lamar Hunt Jr. Sharron Hunt Munson; Ron Pizzuti and a group of local investors
- Head Coach: Tom Fitzgerald
- Stadium: Ohio Stadium
- Major League Soccer: Conference: 2nd Overall: 4th
- MLS Cup playoffs: Conference finals
- U.S. Open Cup: Runners-up
- Top goalscorer: League: Stern John (26); All: Stern John (30)
- Highest home attendance: 15,628 (7/25 v. DAL)
- Lowest home attendance: 9,166 (9/16 v. COL)
- Average home league attendance: 12,255 (48.8%)
- Biggest win: CLB 6–1 NE (8/8)
- Biggest defeat: NY 3–0 CLB (7/19)
Home colors	Away colors

The 1998 Columbus Crew season was the club's third season of existence and their third consecutive season in Major League Soccer, the top flight of soccer in the United States. The first match of the season was on March 21 against Tampa Bay Mutiny. It was the third season under head coach Tom Fitzgerald.

== Roster ==
As of December 6, 1998

Note: Flags indicate national team as defined under FIFA eligibility rules; some limited exceptions apply. Players may hold more than one non-FIFA nationality.

No.	Pos.	Nation	Player
1	GK	USA	Juergen Sommer
2	DF	USA	Mike Lapper
3	DF	USA	Mike Clark
4	DF	ARG	Ricardo Iribarren
5	DF	USA	Thomas Dooley (captain)
6	MF	USA	Todd Yeagley
7	DF	USA	Scott Cannon
8	FW	JAM	Andy Williams
9	FW	USA	Billy Thompson
10	MF	USA	Brian Maisonneuve
11	FW	USA	Jeff Cunningham
12	MF	USA	Jason Farrell

No.	Pos.	Nation	Player
13	DF	TRI	Ancil Elcock
14	FW	TRI	Stern John
15	MF	USA	Andrew Gregor
16	MF	USA	Rob Smith
17	FW	USA	Brian West
19	MF	POL	Robert Warzycha
20	FW	USA	Brian McBride
22	MF	USA	Marcelo Carrera
24	MF	USA	Nick Theslof
25	DF	USA	Ubusuku Abukusumo
33	GK	USA	Mark Dougherty

== Technical Staff ==
Position	Staff
President/General Manager	(United States) Jamey Rootes
Head Coach	(United States) Tom Fitzgerald
Assistant Coach/Goalkeeper Coach	(United States) Greg Andrulis
Assistant Coach/Scout	(United States) Nick Roberts
Head Trainer	(United States) Amy Baer
Team Manager	(United States) Chris Baer

== Non-competitive ==
=== Preseason ===
Columbus started preseason in the Orlando area. They brought their draft picks and some non-roster invitees into training camp that played in some of their early preseason games. These non-roster invitees included Vital Rivelino, Sander Vermuelen, Diego Cerro, Luciano Da Silva, Mikhail Zaritskiy, Chris Lewis, Francisco, and Alejandro Kenig. Alex Deegan from the Richmond Kickers also joined the Crew for 3 weeks in preseason.

February 7 MLS Spring Training	Columbus Crew	0-2	Colorado Rapids	Lake Buena Vista, FL
5:30 PM EST		Report	Siersbaek 50'; Boyce 86'	Stadium: Disney's Wide World of Sports Complex; Referee: Reggie Rutty; Assistant referees: Glenn Prechac; Robbie Mann

February 10 MLS Spring Training	Columbus Crew	1-0	Chicago Fire	Lake Buena Vista, FL
5:30 PM EST	John 34'	Report		Stadium: Disney's Wide World of Sports Complex; Referee: Ricardo Valenzuela; Assistant referees: Richard Huber; Thomas Smith

February 12 Friendly	U.S. U-20 National Team	1-0	Columbus Crew
	Tsakiris	Report

February 14 MLS Spring Training 5th Place Game	Columbus Crew	1-0	Dallas Burn	Lake Buena Vista, FL
7:30 PM EST	John 14'	Report		Stadium: Disney's Wide World of Sports Complex; Referee: Marcel Yonan; Assistant referees: Paul James; Gerry Corrie

February 20 Friendly	Tampa Spartans	1-5	Columbus Crew	Tampa, FL
8:00 PM EST				Stadium: Pepin-Rood Stadium

February 21 Friendly	Tampa Bay Mutiny	v	Columbus Crew	Bradenton, FL
5:00 PM EST				Stadium: Manatee High School

February 24 Friendly	Cocoa Expos	0-3	Columbus Crew	Cocoa, FL
7:30 PM EST			Nebrelius 37'; Warzycha; Theslof	Stadium: Cocoa Expo Sports Center; Attendance: 500

March 1 Friendly	Columbus Crew	2-1	South Carolina Gamecocks
		Report

March 7 Dayton Cup	Columbus Crew	0-0 (3-2 SO)	Kansas City Wizards	Washington Township, OH
7:00 PM EST		Report	McKeon (red card) 51'; Okafor (red card) 82'	Stadium: Centerville Soccer Stadium; Attendance: 5,000
	Shootout
	Thompson (penalty missed); Maisonneuve (penalty scored); Warzycha (penalty missed); Yeagley (penalty missed); McBride (penalty missed); Clark (penalty scored); Cunningham (penalty missed); Elcock (penalty missed); Winner (penalty scored)		(penalty scored) Chung; (penalty missed) Hunjak; (penalty missed) Preki; (penalty missed) Marino; (penalty missed) Johnston; (penalty scored) DeBrito; (penalty missed) Klein; (penalty missed) Uderitz; (penalty missed) Ammann

=== Midseason ===
March 31 Keith Evans Memorial Match	Columbus Crew	v	Indiana Hoosiers	Obetz, OH
5:30 PM EST				Stadium: Crew Training Facility

April 7 Friendly	Cincinnati Riverhawks	2-3	Columbus Crew	Kings Mills, OH
7:00 PM EDT	Yacks 58'; Rocky 63'	Report	Farrell 31'; Carrera 36'; Cunningham 66'	Stadium: Galbreath Field; Attendance: 4,371

April 14 Friendly	Columbus Crew	v	Akron Zips	Obetz, OH
				Stadium: Crew Training Facility

April 21 Friendly	Columbus Crew	v	Xavier Musketeers	Obetz, OH
7:00 PM EDT				Stadium: Crew Training Facility

Friendly	Columbus Crew	v	Ohio State Buckeyes	Obetz, OH
				Stadium: Crew Training Facility

June 26 Friendly	Cincinnati Riverhawks	1-4	Columbus Crew	Kings Mills, OH
8:00 PM EDT	Yacks 31'		Yeagley 30'; Cunningham 34', 60'; John 62'	Stadium: Galbreath Field

== Competitive ==
=== Overview ===
Competition	First match	Last match	Starting round	Final position	Record							
Competition	First match	Last match	Starting round	Final position	Pld	W	D	L	GF	GA	GD	Win %
Major League Soccer	March 21, 1998	September 27, 1998	Matchday 1	4th	32	15	0	17	67	56	+11	46.88
MLS Cup Playoffs	September 30, 1998	October 21, 1998	Conference Semifinals	Conference Finals	5	2	1	2	10	11	−1	40.00
Total					37	17	1	19	77	67	+10	45.95

Source: Competitions

=== MLS ===
==== Standings ====
===== Eastern Conference =====
Pos	Team	Pld	W	SOW	L	GF	GA	GD	Pts	Qualification
1	D.C. United	32	17	7	8	74	48	+26	58	MLS Cup Playoffs
2	Columbus Crew	32	15	0	17	67	56	+11	45	MLS Cup Playoffs
3	MetroStars	32	12	3	17	54	63	−9	39	MLS Cup Playoffs
4	Miami Fusion	32	10	5	17	46	68	−22	35	MLS Cup Playoffs
5	Tampa Bay Mutiny	32	11	1	20	46	57	−11	34	

Source: MLS

===== Overall table =====
Pos	Team	Pld	W	SOW	L	GF	GA	GD	Pts	Qualification
2	D.C. United	32	17	7	8	74	48	+26	58	CONCACAF Champions' Cup
3	Chicago Fire (C)	32	18	2	12	62	45	+17	56	CONCACAF Champions' Cup
4	Columbus Crew	32	15	0	17	67	56	+11	45	
5	Colorado Rapids	32	14	2	16	62	69	−7	44	
6	MetroStars	32	12	3	17	54	63	−9	39	

Source: MLS
Rules for classification: 1) points; 2) head-to-head record; 3) goal difference; 4) number of goals scored
(C) Champions

==== Results summary ====
Overall								Home						Away					
Pld	Pts	W	L	T	GF	GA	GD	W	L	T	GF	GA	GD	W	L	T	GF	GA	GD
32	45	15	17	0	67	56	+11	11	5	0	49	31	+18	4	12	0	18	25	−7

Source: MLS standings
Pld = Matches played; Pts = Points; W = Matches won; T = Matches tied; L = Matches lost; GF = Goals for; GA = Goals against; GD = Goal difference

==== Results by round ====
Round	1	2	3	4	5	6	7	8	9	10	11	12	13	14	15	16	17	18	19	20	21	22	23	24	25	26	27	28	29	30	31	32
Stadium	A	A	H	H	H	A	A	A	H	A	A	H	A	H	H	A	H	A	H	A	H	A	H	H	A	H	H	A	H	A	H	A
Result	W	L	W	W	W	L	W	L	L	W	L	W	L	L	W	L	W	L	L	L	W	L	W	W	W	W	W	L	L	L	L	L

Source: schedule
A = Away; H = Home; W = Win; L = Loss; SW = Shootout Win

==== Match results ====
March 21 1	Tampa Bay Mutiny	1-2	Columbus Crew	Tampa, FL
8:00 PM EST	Duhaney (yellow card) 32'; Hejduk (yellow card) 34'; Ziober (yellow card) 66'; Kinnear 72'	Report	McBride 44'; Maisonneuve 59'; Warzycha (yellow card) 62'; Yeagley (yellow card) 64'	Stadium: Houlihan's Stadium; Attendance: 16,122; Referee: Paul Tamberino; Assistant referees: Craig Lowry; Andrew Barnes; Fourth official: Kevin Hines

March 29 2	Dallas Burn	2-1	Columbus Crew	Dallas, TX
3:00 PM EST	Rodríguez (yellow card) 21'; Elliott 39'; Washington 66'; Kreis (yellow card) 80'	Report	McBride 12'; Lapper (yellow card) 56'	Stadium: Cotton Bowl; Attendance: 10,216; Referee: Esse Baharmast; Assistant referees: Chip Reed; Misail Tsapos; Fourth official: Ali Piran

April 4 3	Columbus Crew	2-1	D.C. United	Columbus, OH
7:30 PM EST	John (yellow card) 8'; Lapper 13', (red card) 21'; McBride 56'	Report	Pope (yellow card) 20' (red card) 64'; Moreno 21', (yellow card) 23'	Stadium: Ohio Stadium; Attendance: 14,148; Referee: Tim Weyland; Assistant referees: Nate Clement; Richard Eddy; Fourth official: Hugh Cullin

April 11 4	Columbus Crew	3-2	New England Revolution	Columbus, OH
7:30 PM EDT	Warzycha 9'; Farrell 57'; McBride 89'	Report	Wise (yellow card) 32'; McKinley (yellow card) 53'; Nakhid (yellow card) 67'; Arce 68'; Goulooze (red card) 74'; Keegan 89'	Stadium: Ohio Stadium; Attendance: 10,121; Referee: Richard Heron; Assistant referees: Delfrim Rainho; Roberto Van de Wyngard; Fourth official: Mikael Lundqvist

April 18 5	Columbus Crew	5-1	Miami Fusion F.C.	Columbus, OH
7:30 PM EDT	Farell 37'; John 48', 56', 70'; McBride 64'	Report	Kooiman (yellow card) 19'; Stebbins 51'	Stadium: Ohio Stadium; Attendance: 12,636; Referee: Robert Sheker; Assistant referees: Zekay Akbay; Brian Darling; Fourth official: Douglas Palomaki

April 26 6	D.C. United	1-1 (3-2 SO)	Columbus Crew	Washington, D.C.
3:00 PM EDT	Peay (yellow card) 49'; Agoos (yellow card) 87'; Moreno 89'	Report	John 4'; Iribarren (yellow card) 53'; Warzycha (yellow card) 84'	Stadium: Robert F. Kennedy Memorial Stadium; Attendance: 11,338; Referee: Paul Tamberino; Assistant referees: Jorge Reyes; Thomas Perry; Fourth official: Daniel Stead
	Shootout
	Etcheverry (penalty scored); Moreno (penalty missed); Harkes (penalty missed); Sanneh (penalty scored); Agoos (penalty scored)		(penalty missed) Carrera; (penalty scored) Thompson; (penalty missed) John; (penalty missed) Yeagley; (penalty scored) McBride

April 30 7	Tampa Bay Mutiny	0-1	Columbus Crew	Tampa, FL
7:30 PM EDT	Keller (yellow card) 20' (yellow-red card) 85'; Houser (yellow card) 28'	Report	Smith (yellow card) 12'; Yeagley 59'; Clark (yellow card) 63' (yellow-red card) 80'; Cunningham (yellow card) 86'	Stadium: Houlihan's Stadium; Attendance: 4,892; Referee: Juan Carlos Paniagua; Assistant referees: Reggie Rutty; Shane Moody; Fourth official: Jaime Guerra

May 9 8	Miami Fusion F.C.	2-0	Columbus Crew	Fort Lauderdale, FL
4:00 PM EDT	Stebbins 13'; Vaudreuil (yellow card) 19'; Kmosko (yellow card) 37'; Kooiman (yellow card) 50'; Tamashiro 82', (yellow card) 90'; Serna (yellow card) 83'	Report		Stadium: Lockhart Stadium; Attendance: 9,010; Referee: Esse Baharmast; Assistant referees: Reggie Rutty; Jose Boza; Fourth official: Sophie Rhodes

May 17 9	Columbus Crew	2-4	Los Angeles Galaxy	Columbus, OH
3:00 PM EDT	Cunningham 18'; Carrera 50'	Report	Machón 46', 75', 85'; Mathis (yellow card) 78'; Wélton 90'	Stadium: Ohio Stadium; Attendance: 10,854; Referee: Ted Covaciu; Assistant referees: Tarek Khan; Jamil Hamdan; Fourth official: Hugh Cullin

May 22 10	New England Revolution	0-2	Columbus Crew	Foxborough, MA
7:30 PM EDT	Chronopoulos (yellow card) 71'	Report	Cunningham 35'; Warzycha 48'; Gregor (yellow card) 83'	Stadium: Foxboro Stadium; Attendance: 14,302; Referee: Noel Kenny; Assistant referees: Chip Reed; Alberto Giordano; Fourth official: Claudiu Badea

May 27 11	Kansas City Wizards	1-1 (3-2 SO)	Columbus Crew	Kansas City, MO
8:30 PM EDT	Preki (yellow card) 50'; Rideout 82'; Bowers (red card) 90'	Report	Farrell 54'; Thompson (yellow card) 87'	Stadium: Arrowhead Stadium; Attendance: 5,027; Referee: Ruben Rodhas; Assistant referees: Paul Scott; Alan Shepherd; Fourth official: Ermanno Rossi
	Shootout
	Chung (penalty missed); Hunjak (penalty scored); Preki (penalty scored); Marino (penalty scored)		(penalty missed) Thompson; (penalty missed) Farrell; (penalty scored) Elcock; (penalty scored) Warzycha; (penalty missed) West

May 30 12	Columbus Crew	4-1	San Jose Clash	Columbus, OH
7:30 PM EDT	Cunnigham 27'; John 62', 72', 80'	Report	Baicher 31'; Doyle (yellow card) 60'	Stadium: Ohio Stadium; Attendance: 10,903; Referee: Kevin Terry; Assistant referees: Edwin Resendes; Brian Darling; Fourth official: Mikael Lundqvist

June 6 13	Chicago Fire	2-0	Columbus Crew	Chicago, IL
8:00 PM EDT	Razov (yellow card) 3'; Kotschau 8'; Brown (yellow card) 48'; Nowak 52'	Report	Elcock (yellow card) 81'	Stadium: Soldier Field; Attendance: 19,801; Referee: Noel Kenny; Assistant referees: Edwin Resendes; John Spicer-Escalante; Fourth official: Marcos Guitron

June 13 14	Columbus Crew	3-3 (3-4 SO)	D.C. United	Columbus, OH
7:30 PM EDT	Farrell 7'; John 29' (pen.), (yellow card) 63'; Clark (yellow card) 31'; West 49'; Carrera (yellow card) 59'; Iribarren (yellow card) 81'; Gregor (yellow card) 90'	Report	Harkes 25'; Sanneh (yellow card) 31'; Moreno 37' (pen.); Presthus (yellow card) 45'; Llamosa (yellow card) 61'; Lassiter 67'	Stadium: Ohio Stadium; Attendance: 13,347; Referee: Marcel Yonan; Assistant referees: Gerry Corrie; Brian Darling; Fourth official: Douglas Palomaki
	Shootout
	John (penalty missed); Carrera (penalty missed); Cunningham (penalty scored); Farrell (penalty scored); Elcock (penalty scored); Clark (penalty missed)		(penalty scored) Etcheverry; (penalty missed) Moreno; (penalty scored) Wood; (penalty scored) Sanneh; (penalty missed) Lassiter; (penalty scored) Talley

June 20 15	Columbus Crew	2-1	NY/NJ MetroStars	Columbus, OH
7:30 PM EDT	John 29'; Yeagley (yellow card) 48'; Thompson 63'; Elcock (yellow card) 87'	Report	Kelly 7'; Knowles (yellow card) 26'	Stadium: Ohio Stadium; Attendance: 11,301; Referee: Kevin Terry; Assistant referees: Kermit Quisenberry; John Konstantinidis; Fourth official: Hugh Cullin

July 3 16	San Jose Clash	1-1 (4-2 SO)	Columbus Crew	San Jose, CA
10:30 PM EDT	Gough (yellow card) 2'; Cerritos 84'	Report	Clark (yellow card) 36'; Maisonneuve 39'	Stadium: Spartan Stadium; Attendance: 10,326; Referee: Ted Covaciu; Assistant referees: Javier Padilla; David Bragg; Fourth official: Cory Dean
	Shootout
	Wynalda (penalty scored); Lewis (penalty scored); Cloutier (penalty scored); Mella (penalty scored)		(penalty scored) Thompson; (penalty missed) Elcock; (penalty scored) Cunningham; (penalty missed) McBride

July 9 17	Columbus Crew	3-0	Chicago Fire	Columbus, OH
7:30 PM EDT	John 8'; Dooley (yellow card) 34'; Smith 40'; McBride 68'	Report		Stadium: Ohio Stadium; Attendance: 10,091; Referee: Paul Tamberino; Assistant referees: Roberto Van de Wyngard; Brian Darling; Fourth official: Douglas Palomaki
Note: Originally scheduled for August 26.

July 19 18	NY/NJ MetroStars	3-0	Columbus Crew	East Rutherford, NJ
3:00 PM EDT	Savarese 26'; Kelly (yellow card) 40'; Hurtado 42', 86'; Ramos (red card) 60'	Report	Gregor (yellow card) 10'; West (yellow card) 34'; Thompson (yellow card) 61'	Stadium: Giants Stadium; Attendance: 13,826; Referee: Kevin Stott; Assistant referees: Greg Barkey; Rob Fereday; Fourth official: Ken Heller

July 25 19	Columbus Crew	1-2	Dallas Burn	Columbus, OH
7:30 PM EDT	Yeagley (yellow card) 9', (goal) 41'	Report	Trotman 10'; Farrer (yellow card) 79'; Santel (yellow card) 82'; Rodríguez 85'	Stadium: Ohio Stadium; Attendance: 15,628; Referee: Noel Kenny; Assistant referees: Jorge Reyes; Patrick Ruetschle; Fourth official: Mikael Lundqvist

July 29 20	Miami Fusion F.C.	3-2	Columbus Crew	Fort Lauderdale, FL
7:30 PM EDT	Herrera 8', 61' (pen.); Gutierrez 34', (yellow card) 56'; McLaren (yellow card) 58'; Webber (yellow card) 60'; Serna (yellow card) 64'; Mastroeni (yellow card) 85'	Report	Iribarren (yellow card) 63' (yellow-red card) 75'; Cunningham 64', 82'; Dooley (yellow card) 65'; Smith (yellow card) 77'	Stadium: Lockhart Stadium; Attendance: 8,182; Referee: Ruben Rodhas; Assistant referees: Kermit Quisenberry; Jose Boza; Fourth official: Robbie Mann
Note: Originally scheduled for July 8.

August 8 21	Columbus Crew	6-1	New England Revolution	Columbus, OH
7:00 PM EDT	Farrell 19'; Clark (yellow card) 21'; John 32', 84'; McBride 41'; Dooley 63'; Smith 78'	Report	Moore (yellow card) 17'; Nakhid (yellow card) 51'; Arce 89'	Stadium: Ohio Stadium; Attendance: 13,712; Referee: Michael Kennedy; Assistant referees: Edwin Resendes; Jamil Hamdan; Fourth official: Douglas Palomaki

August 12 22	NY/NJ MetroStars	3-1	Columbus Crew	East Rutherford, NJ
7:30 PM EDT	Vega (yellow card) 12', (goal) 58'; Meola (yellow card) 21'; Hurtado (yellow card) 27'; Rooney 75'; Joseph 88'	Report	Iribarren (yellow card) 7'; Cunningham 69'	Stadium: Giants Stadium; Attendance: 12,117; Referee: Noel Kenny; Assistant referees: Chip Reed; Delfrim Rainho; Fourth official: Ken Heller

August 16 23	Columbus Crew	5-3	Kansas City Wizards	Columbus, OH
3:00 PM EDT	Cunningham 6'; Bowers 54' (o.g.); John 71', 79', 81'; Iribarren (yellow card) 73'	Report	Wright (yellow card) 30'; Preki 35', 52'; Rideout 7'	Stadium: Ohio Stadium; Attendance: 11,922; Referee: Alberto Giordano; Assistant referees: Craig Lowry; Tarek Khan; Fourth official: Hugh Cullin

August 22 24	Columbus Crew	3-1	Tampa Bay Mutiny	Columbus, OH
7:30 PM EDT	Yeagley (yellow card) 47'; John 59', 76'; Williams 84'	Report	Eriksson (yellow card) 34'; Kinnear 40'; Houser (yellow card) 41'; Salcedo (yellow card) 54'	Stadium: Ohio Stadium; Attendance: 15,110; Referee: Ali Saheli; Assistant referees: Richard Eddy; Zekay Akbay; Fourth official: Mikael Lundqvist

August 29 25	Los Angeles Galaxy	0-3	Columbus Crew	Pasadena, CA
10:30 PM EDT	Cienfuegos (yellow card) 57'; Mathis (yellow card) 76'	Report	McBride 31', (yellow card) 37'; John 44', 79'	Stadium: Rose Bowl; Attendance: 19,633; Referee: Reggie Rutty; Assistant referees: Roberto Van de Wyngard; Kari Seitz; Fourth official: Theodore Bennett

September 6 26	Columbus Crew	4-3	NY/NJ MetroStars	Columbus, OH
3:00 PM EDT	Duhaney 25' (o.g.); John 36'; McBride 45' (pen.), (yellow card) 50'; Smith 67'; Iribarren (yellow card) 80'	Report	Kelly (yellow card) 18'; Ramos (yellow card) 29'; Semioli (yellow card) 35' (yellow-red card) 51'; Hurtado 42'; Savarese 54', 77'; Palacios (red card) 78'	Stadium: Ohio Stadium; Attendance: 13,598; Referee: Rich Grady; Assistant referees: Nate Clement; Rob Fereday; Fourth official: Douglas Palomaki

September 9 27	Columbus Crew	1-0	Miami Fusion F.C.	Columbus, OH
7:30 PM EDT	Warzycha (yellow card) 41'; Cunningham 49'	Report	Martinez (yellow card) 10' (yellow-red card) 33'	Stadium: Ohio Stadium; Attendance: 9,305; Referee: Jose Manuel Garcia Aranda; Assistant referees: Greg Barkey; Chip Reed; Fourth official: Mikael Lundqvist

September 12 28	New England Revolution	2-0	Columbus Crew	Foxborough, MA
7:30 PM EDT	Moore 35'; Motajo (yellow card) 46'; Baba (yellow card) 50'; Feuer (yellow card) 57'; Jair 83'	Report		Stadium: Foxboro Stadium; Attendance: 35,462; Referee: Jose Manuel Garcia Aranda; Assistant referees: Chip Reed; Sophie Rhodes; Fourth official: Thomas Supple

September 16 29	Columbus Crew	2-4	Colorado Rapids	Columbus, OH
7:30 PM EDT	Yeagley (yellow card) 11'; Elcock (yellow card) 11'; John 63', 64'; Iribarren (yellow card) 90'	Report	DiGiamarino 32', 74'; Trittschuh (yellow card) 42'; Bravo 51'; Harris 89'	Stadium: Ohio Stadium; Attendance: 9,166; Referee: Ricardo Valenzuela; Assistant referees: Chip Reed; Richard Eddy; Fourth official: Douglas Palomaki
Note: Originally scheduled for September 20.

September 19 30	Colorado Rapids	2-1	Columbus Crew	Denver, CO
9:00 PM EDT	Bravo 40' (pen.); Harris 68'; Paz (yellow card) 76'	Report	Warzycha (yellow card) 23'; John 44'; Elcock (yellow card) 45'	Stadium: Mile High Stadium; Attendance: 23,452; Referee: Tim Weyland; Assistant referees: Alex Prus; Richard Heron; Fourth official: Casey Dout
Note: Originally scheduled for July 16.

September 24 31	Columbus Crew	3-4	Tampa Bay Mutiny	Columbus, OH
8:00 PM EDT	John 28'; McBride 75' (pen.); Maisonneuve 78'	Report	Dougherty 10'; Eriksson (yellow card) 21'; Ramos 30', 46'; McCarty (yellow card) 70'; Shannon 87'	Stadium: Ohio Stadium; Attendance: 14,552; Referee: Alex Prus; Assistant referees: Craig Lowry; Gerry Corrie; Fourth official: Hugh Cullin

September 27 32	D.C. United	2-2 (3-2 SO)	Columbus Crew	Washington, D.C.
7:30 PM EDT	Wood 2'; Llamosa (yellow card) 56'; Smith 70' (o.g.)	Report	John 10', 15'; Iribarren (yellow card) 43'	Stadium: Robert F. Kennedy Memorial Stadium; Attendance: 14,440; Referee: Rich Grady; Assistant referees: Richard Huber; Greg Barkey; Fourth official: Daniel Stead
	Shootout
	Agoos (penalty missed); Wood (penalty scored); Harkes (penalty scored); Aunger (penalty missed); Lassiter (penalty scored)		(penalty scored) West; (penalty missed) McBride; (penalty scored) John; (penalty missed) Williams; (penalty missed) Elcock

=== MLS Cup Playoffs ===
==== Conference Semifinals ====
September 30 Game 1	Columbus Crew	5-3	NY/NJ MetroStars	Columbus, OH
7:30 PM EDT	McBride 9', 12'; Smith 33'; Farrell 38', (yellow card) 48'; Williams (yellow card) 55'; John 58'; Iribarren (yellow card) 60'; Warzycha (yellow card) 81'	Report	Vega (yellow card) 17'; Hurtado 53'; Sorber 60' (pen.); Joseph 80'	Stadium: Ohio Stadium; Attendance: 10,996; Referee: Ali Saheli; Assistant referees: Greg Barkey; George Vergara; Fourth official: Michael Kennedy

October 3 Game 2	NY/NJ MetroStars	1-1 (2-3 SO)	Columbus Crew	East Rutherford, NJ
7:00 PM EDT	Ramos 13'; Palacios (yellow card) 16'; Joseph (yellow card) 33'; Lalas (yellow card) 72'	Report	Iribarren (yellow card) 13'; John 22'; McBride (yellow card) 83'	Stadium: Giants Stadium; Attendance: 11,686; Referee: Michael Kennedy; Assistant referees: Craig Lowry; Peter Kokolski; Fourth official: Alberto Giordano
	Shootout
	Ramos (penalty scored); Savarese (penalty missed); Duhaney (penalty missed); Sorber (penalty scored); Petke (penalty missed)		(penalty scored) Thompson; (penalty missed) Yeagley; (penalty scored) Dooley; (penalty scored) John; (penalty missed) Williams
Note: Columbus Crew wins series 2-0, advances to Conference finals.

October 7 Game 3	Columbus Crew	If Necessary	NY/NJ MetroStars	Columbus, OH
7:30 PM EDT				Stadium: Ohio Stadium

==== Conference Finals ====
October 11 Game 1	D.C. United	2-0	Columbus Crew	Washington, D.C.
3:00 PM EDT	Sanneh 68'; Etcheverry 78'	Report	Yeagley (yellow card) 53'; Elcock (yellow card) 56'; McBride (yellow card) 73'	Stadium: Robert F. Kennedy Memorial Stadium; Attendance: 17,755; Referee: Kevin Stott; Assistant referees: Craig Lowry; George Vergara; Fourth official: Alberto Giordano

October 18 Game 2	Columbus Crew	4-2	D.C. United	Columbus, OH
4:00 PM EDT	McBride 8', 47'; Dooley (yellow card) 18', (goal) 37'; Smith (yellow card) 29'; Elcock (yellow card) 75'; Iribarren (yellow card) 78'; John 81'	Report	Llamosa (yellow card) 47'; Aunger (yellow card) 62'; Sanneh 65'; Lassiter 77'; Williams (yellow card) 88'	Stadium: Ohio Stadium; Attendance: 13,193; Referee: Rich Grady; Assistant referees: Tom Bobadilla; Levon Baladjanian; Fourth official: Ted Covaciu

October 21 Game 3	D.C. United	3-0	Columbus Crew	Washington, D.C.
8:00 PM EDT	Agoos 12'; Etcheverry (yellow card) 21'; Lassiter 44', 79'	Report	Clark (yellow card) 28'; Farrell (yellow card) 56'	Stadium: Robert F. Kennedy Memorial Stadium; Attendance: 21,453; Referee: Noel Kenny; Assistant referees: Greg Barkey; Craig Lowry; Fourth official: Paul Tamberino
Note: D.C. United wins series 2-1, advances to MLS Cup 1998.

=== U.S. Open Cup ===
July 7 Third round	Rochester Raging Rhinos (A-L) (New York (state))	1-2 (a.e.t.)	(Ohio) Columbus Crew (MLS)	Rochester, NY
	Hardy (yellow card) 9'; Demmin (yellow card) 28'; Tilley 60'; Schweitzer (red card) 79'	(Report)	McBride 13' (pen.); Elcock (yellow card) 19'; Yeagley 103'	Stadium: Frontier Field; Attendance: 9287

July 22 Quarterfinals	Columbus Crew (MLS) (Ohio)	3-0	(Florida) Miami Fusion F.C. (MLS)	Chattanooga, TN
	Cunningham 12'; McBride 36', 44'	Report	Webber (yellow card) 28'	Stadium: Finley Stadium; Attendance: 3,757; Referee: Sandra Hunt

August 4 Semifinals	Columbus Crew (MLS) (Ohio)	1-0	(New Jersey) NY/NJ MetroStars (MLS)	New Orleans, Louisiana
7:00 PM EDT	Iribarren 5'	Report	Meola (yellow card) 45'	Stadium: Zephyr Field; Attendance: 6,142; Referee: Tim Weyland

October 30 Final	Chicago Fire (MLS) (Illinois)	2-1 (a.e.t.)	(Ohio) Columbus Crew (MLS)	Chicago, IL
9:00 PM EST	Keller (yellow card) 17'; Podbrożny 45' (pen.); Okaroh (yellow card) 60'; Brown (yellow card) 69'; Klopas 99'	Report	Sommer (yellow card) 43'; John 53'; Maisonneuve (yellow card) 60'; Elcock (yellow card) 61'	Stadium: Soldier Field; Attendance: 18,615; Referee: Arturo Angeles
Note: Originally scheduled to be played at Virginia Beach Sportsplex on August 26, then rescheduled to August 27 due to Hurricane Bonnie.

== Statistics ==
=== Appearances and goals ===
Under "Apps" for each section, the first number represents the number of starts, and the second number represents appearances as a substitute.

No.	Pos	Nat	Player	Total		MLS		MLS Cup Playoffs		U.S. Open Cup	
No.	Pos	Nat	Player	Apps	Goals	Apps	Goals	Apps	Goals	Apps	Goals
1	GK	(United States) USA	Juergen Sommer	30	0	21+0	0	5+0	0	3+1	0
2	DF	(United States) USA	Mike Lapper	7	1	7+0	1	0+0	0	0+0	0
3	DF	(United States) USA	Mike Clark	39	0	30+0	0	5+0	0	4+0	0
4	DF	(Argentina) ARG	Ricardo Iribarren	30	1	22+2	0	4+0	0	2+0	1
5	DF	(United States) USA	Thomas Dooley	31	2	23+0	1	5+0	1	3+0	0
6	MF	(United States) USA	Todd Yeagley	36	3	22+5	2	4+1	0	3+1	1
7	DF	(United States) USA	Scott Cannon	17	0	9+6	0	0+0	0	2+0	0
8	FW	(Jamaica) JAM	Andy Williams	19	1	11+2	1	3+1	0	2+0	0
9	FW	(United States) USA	Billy Thompson	34	1	24+5	1	0+3	0	2+0	0
10	MF	(United States) USA	Brian Maisonneuve	16	3	12+1	3	1+0	0	2+0	0
11	FW	(United States) USA	Jeff Cunningham	30	9	8+17	8	0+2	0	1+2	1
12	MF	(United States) USA	Jason Farrell	36	6	24+4	5	5+0	1	1+2	0
13	DF	(Trinidad and Tobago) TRI	Ancil Elcock	36	0	27+1	0	5+0	0	3+0	0
14	FW	(Trinidad and Tobago) TRI	Stern John	35	30	25+2	26	5+0	3	3+0	1
15	MF	(United States) USA	Andrew Gregor	12	0	3+7	0	0+0	0	1+1	0
16	MF	(United States) USA	Rob Smith	33	4	15+9	3	5+0	1	3+1	0
17	FW	(United States) USA	Brian West	19	1	4+9	1	2+2	0	1+1	0
19	MF	(Poland) POL	Robert Warzycha	30	2	19+6	2	0+3	0	2+0	0
20	FW	(United States) USA	Brian McBride	33	17	24+0	10	5+0	4	4+0	3
22	MF	(United States) USA	Marcelo Carrera	17	1	5+11	1	0+0	0	0+1	0
24	MF	(United States) USA	Nick Theslof	0	0	0+0	0	0+0	0	0+0	0
25	DF	(United States) USA	Ubusuku Abukusumo	12	0	3+4	0	1+2	0	1+1	0
33	GK	(United States) USA	Mark Dougherty	12	0	11+0	0	0+0	0	1+0	0
			Own goal	0	2	-	2	-	0	-	0
Players who left Columbus during the season:
18	GK	(United States) USA	David Winner	1	0	0+1	0	0+0	0	0+0	0
21	MF	(United States) USA	Brandon Ward	0	0	0+0	0	0+0	0	0+0	0
23	FW	(United States) USA	Jimmy Glenn	5	0	3+2	0	0+0	0	0+0	0
26	MF	(United States) USA	Craig Yacks	0	0	0+0	0	0+0	0	0+0	0

=== Disciplinary record ===
No.	Pos.	Name	MLS		MLS Cup Playoffs		U.S. Open Cup		Total	
No.	Pos.	Name	Booked	Sent off (straight red)	Booked	Sent off (straight red)	Booked	Sent off (straight red)	Booked	Sent off (straight red)
1	GK	(United States) Juergen Sommer	0	0	0	0	1	0	1	0
2	DF	(United States) Mike Lapper	1	1	0	0	0	0	1	1
3	DF	(United States) Mike Clark	4	1	1	0	0	0	5	1
4	DF	(Argentina) Ricardo Iribarren	8	1	3	0	0	0	11	1
5	DF	(United States) Thomas Dooley	2	0	1	0	0	0	3	0
6	MF	(United States) Todd Yeagley	5	0	1	0	0	0	6	0
7	DF	(United States) Scott Cannon	0	0	0	0	0	0	0	0
8	FW	(Jamaica) Andy Williams	0	0	1	0	0	0	1	0
9	FW	(United States) Billy Thompson	2	0	0	0	0	0	2	0
10	MF	(United States) Brian Maisonneuve	0	0	0	0	1	0	1	0
11	FW	(United States) Jeff Cunningham	1	0	0	0	0	0	1	0
12	MF	(United States) Jason Farrell	0	0	2	0	0	0	2	0
13	DF	(Trinidad and Tobago) Ancil Elcock	4	0	2	0	2	0	8	0
14	FW	(Trinidad and Tobago) Stern John	2	0	0	0	0	0	2	0
15	MF	(United States) Andrew Gregor	3	0	0	0	0	0	3	0
16	MF	(United States) Rob Smith	2	0	1	0	0	0	3	0
17	FW	(United States) Brian West	1	0	0	0	0	0	1	0
19	MF	(Poland) Robert Warzycha	4	0	1	0	0	0	5	0
20	FW	(United States) Brian McBride	2	0	2	0	0	0	4	0
22	MF	(United States) Marcelo Carrera	1	0	0	0	0	0	1	0
24	MF	(United States) Nick Theslof	0	0	0	0	0	0	0	0
25	DF	(United States) Ubusuku Abukusumo	0	0	0	0	0	0	0	0
33	GK	(United States) Mark Dougherty	0	0	0	0	0	0	0	0
Players who left Columbus during the season:
18	GK	(United States) David Winner	0	0	0	0	0	0	0	0
21	MF	(United States) Brandon Ward	0	0	0	0	0	0	0	0
23	FW	(United States) Jimmy Glenn	0	0	0	0	0	0	0	0
26	MF	(United States) Craig Yacks	0	0	0	0	0	0	0	0

=== Clean sheets ===
No.	Name	MLS	MLS Cup Playoffs	U.S. Open Cup	Total	Games Played
1	(United States) Juergen Sommer	4	0	1	5	30
33	(United States) Mark Dougherty	1	0	1	2	12
Players who left Columbus during the season:
18	(United States) David Winner	0	0	0	0	1

== Transfers ==
=== In ===
Pos.	Player	Transferred from	Fee/notes	Date	Source
FW	(United States) Brian West	(United States) Virginia Cavaliers	Allocated by Major League Soccer as part of MLS Project-40.	January 20, 1998	
FW	(United States) Juergen Sommer	(United States) Queens Park Rangers F.C.	Allocated by Major League Soccer	January 28, 1998	
FW	(United States) Jeff Cunningham	(United States) South Florida Bulls	Drafted in round 1 of the 1998 MLS College Draft.	January 31, 1998	
MF	(United States) Andrew Gregor	(United States) Portland Pilots	Drafted in round 2 of the 1998 MLS College Draft.	February 1, 1998	
FW	(Sweden) Henrik Nebrelius	(United States) Tampa Spartans	Drafted in round 2 of the 1998 MLS College Draft.	February 1, 1998	
MF	(United States) Nick Theslof	(United States) UCLA Bruins	Drafted in round 3 of the 1998 MLS College Draft.	February 1, 1998	
MF	(United States) Brandon Ward	(United States) Richmond Kickers	Drafted in round 1 of the 1998 MLS Supplemental Draft.	February 1, 1998	
MF	(United States) Scott Cannon	(United States) Richmond Kickers	Drafted in round 2 of the 1998 MLS Supplemental Draft.	February 1, 1998	
MF	(United States) Jason Farrell	(United States) Chicago Fire	Traded for Frank Klopas.	February 19, 1998	
FW	(Trinidad and Tobago) Stern John	(United States) New Orleans Riverboat Gamblers	Signed via discovery.	February 26, 1998	
FW	(Jamaica) Andy Williams	(Jamaica) Harbour View F.C.	Signed via discovery.	March 2, 1998	
DF	(Argentina) Ricardo Iribarren	(Argentina) Club Almagro	Allocated by Major League Soccer after clearing up visa problems.	March 30, 1998	

=== Loan in ===
Pos.	Player	Parent club	Length/Notes	Beginning	End	Source
GK	(United States) Chris Wanamaker	(United States) Cincinnati Riverhawks	Short term agreement. Did not make a game roster.	April 23, 1998	April 24, 1998	
FW	(United States) Jimmy Glenn	(United States) Rochester Raging Rhinos	Short term agreement.	May 12, 1998	June 30, 1998	
FW	(United States) Jason Cairns	(United States) Cincinnati Riverhawks	Short term agreement. Did not make a game roster.	June 3, 1998	June 10, 1998	
DF	(United States) Mike Crosby	(United States) Cincinnati Riverhawks	Short term agreement. Did not make a game roster.	June 3, 1998	June 10, 1998	
MF	(United States) Craig Yacks	(United States) Cincinnati Riverhawks	Short term agreements.	June 3, 1998; July 23, 1998	June 10, 1998; July 26, 1998	
DF	(United States) Brett Strang	(United States) Cincinnati Riverhawks	Short term agreement. Did not make a game roster.	June 3, 1998	June 10, 1998	

=== Out ===
Pos.	Player	Transferred to	Fee/notes	Date	Source
FW	(United States) Frank Klopas	(United States) Chicago Fire	Traded for Jason Farrell.	February 19, 1998	
FW	(Sweden) Henrik Nebrelius	(Sweden) Ystads IF	Placed on waivers.	March, 1998	
DF	(United States) Brandon Ward	(United States) Chicago Stingers	Placed on waivers.	March 30, 1998	
GK	(United States) David Winner	(United States) New England Revolution	Placed on waivers.	June 30, 1998	
DF	(Argentina) Ricardo Iribarren	(United States) Milwaukee Rampage	Placed on waivers.	October 31, 1998	
DF	(United States) Scott Cannon	(United States) Richmond Kickers	Placed on waivers.	October 31, 1998	
FW	(Argentina) Marcelo Carrera	(United States) Canton Invaders	Placed on waivers.	October 31, 1998	
MF	(United States) Andrew Gregor	(United States) Seattle Sounders	Contract expired	December 31, 1998	
MF	(United States) Nick Theslof	Retired	Contract expired	December 31, 1998	

=== Loans out ===
Pos.	Player	Loanee club	Length/Notes	Beginning	End	Source
FW	(United States) Brian West	(United States) MLS Project-40	Multiple short term agreements.	February 25, 1998	End of Season	
DF	(United States) Ubusuku Abukusumo	(United States) MLS Project-40	Multiple short term agreements.	February 25, 1998	End of Season	
MF	(United States) Andrew Gregor	(United States) Cincinnati Riverhawks	Multiple short term agreements.	March 21, 1998	End of Season	
MF	(United States) Nick Theslof	(United States) Cincinnati Riverhawks	Multiple short term agreements.	March 21, 1998	End of Season	
GK	(United States) David Winner	(United States) Worcester Wildfire	Columbus retains right to recall.	April 17, 1998	May 16, 1998	
MF	(United States) Andrew Gregor	(United States) MLS Project-40	Multiple short term agreements.	April 23, 1998	End of Season	

=== MLS Draft picks ===
Draft picks are not automatically signed to the team roster. Only those who are signed to a contract will be listed as transfers in. The picks for the Columbus Crew are listed below:

1998 Columbus Crew College Draft Picks
Round	Pick	Player	Position	College
1	9	(United States) Jeff Cunningham	FW	South Florida
2	21	(United States) Andrew Gregor	MF	Portland
2	24	(Sweden) Henrik Nebrelius	FW	Tampa
3	33	(United States) Nick Theslof	MF	UCLA

1998 Columbus Crew Supplemental Draft Picks
Round	Pick	Player	Position	College
1	12	(United States) Brandon Ward	MF	Indiana
2	21	(United States) Scott Cannon	MF	Evansville

== Awards ==
=== MLS Player of the Week ===
Week	Player	Opponent(s)	Link
4	(United States) Jason Farrell	New England Revolution	
5	(Trinidad and Tobago) Stern John	Miami Fusion F.C.	
11	(Trinidad and Tobago) Stern John	San Jose Clash	
20	(Trinidad and Tobago) Stern John	Kansas City Wizards	

=== MLS Player of the Month ===
Month	Player	Stats	Link
April	(United States) Juergen Sommer		
August	(Trinidad and Tobago) Stern John		

=== 1998 MLS All-Star Game ===
Starters

- DF Thomas Dooley
- FW Brian McBride (MVP)

Reserves

- FW Stern John
- MF Brian Maisonneuve

=== Postseason ===
MLS Best XI

- FW Stern John
- DF Thomas Dooley

MLS Scoring Champion

- FW Stern John

MLS Goal of the Year

- FW Brian McBride

MLS Fair Play Award

- DF Thomas Dooley

=== Crew Team Awards ===
- Most Valuable Player – Stern John
- Defensive Player of the Year – Thomas Dooley
- Scoring Champion – Stern John
- Man of the Year – Mike Clark
- Coach's Award – Ancil Elcock
