= 1998 D.C. United season =

D.C. United
1998 season
- General manager: Dave Kasper
- Head coach: Bruce Arena
- Stadium: RFK Stadium
- MLS: 2nd
- MLS Cup: Runners-Up
- CONCACAF Champions Cup: Champions
- Copa Interamericana: Champions
- Top goalscorer: League: All: Roy Lassiter (18)
Home colors	Away colors	Third colors

The 1998 D.C. United season was the clubs' fourth year of existence, as well as their third season in Major League Soccer.

D.C. United entered their third season as the two-time defending MLS Cup champion, as well as the defending Supporters' Shield titleholder. Finishing as runners-up in MLS Cup '98 and second-place in the regular season standings, United failed to defend both domestic honors. In international play, D.C. United made American soccer history, becoming the first American soccer club to win any CONCACAF club tournament when they won the 1998 CONCACAF Champions' Cup. It was only the third time in CONCACAF history that an American soccer club reached the Champions' Cup final (previously achieved by Los Angeles Galaxy the previous season and New York Pancyprian-Freedoms in 1984 though they were disqualified without playing in the finals). Besides D.C. United, only the Galaxy have won the Champions' Cup, which they accomplished in 2000. Following the Galaxy's win, no American club reached the North American club final again until 2011 when Real Salt Lake reached the 2011 CONCACAF Champions League Finals.

== Background ==
D.C. United ended their sophomore campaign on a high note, claiming the "league double", earning both the Supporters' Shield (regular season), and the 1997 MLS Cup championship (postseason). During the 1997 campaign, the club nearly earned a tuble, which is to win four or more top tier trophies during a single season, but ultimately fell short of that. In the domestic cup competition, the U.S. Open Cup, D.C. United reached the final of the competition, only to lose against Dallas Burn (now known as FC Dallas). In the continental club tournament, the CONCACAF Champions' Cup, United finished in third place, after falling to Los Angeles Galaxy in the semifinals.

== Competitions ==
=== Major League Soccer ===
==== Standings ====
===== Eastern Conference =====
Pos	Team	Pld	W	SOW	L	GF	GA	GD	Pts	Qualification
1	D.C. United	32	17	7	8	74	48	+26	58	MLS Cup Playoffs
2	Columbus Crew	32	15	0	17	67	56	+11	45	MLS Cup Playoffs
3	MetroStars	32	12	3	17	54	63	−9	39	MLS Cup Playoffs
4	Miami Fusion	32	10	5	17	46	68	−22	35	MLS Cup Playoffs
5	Tampa Bay Mutiny	32	11	1	20	46	57	−11	34	
6	New England Revolution	32	9	2	21	53	66	−13	29	

Source: MLS

===== Overall table =====
Pos	Team	Pld	W	SOW	L	GF	GA	GD	Pts	Qualification
1	Los Angeles Galaxy (S)	32	22	2	8	85	44	+41	68	CONCACAF Champions' Cup
2	D.C. United	32	17	7	8	74	48	+26	58	CONCACAF Champions' Cup
3	Chicago Fire (C)	32	18	2	12	62	45	+17	56	CONCACAF Champions' Cup
4	Columbus Crew	32	15	0	17	67	56	+11	45	
5	Colorado Rapids	32	14	2	16	62	69	−7	44	

Source: MLS
Rules for classification: 1) points; 2) head-to-head record; 3) goal difference; 4) number of goals scored
(C) Champions; (S) Supporters' Shield

==== Results by round ====
Matchday	1	2	3	4	5	6	7	8	9	10	11	12	13	14	15	16	17	18	19	20	21	22	23	24	25	26	27	28	29	30	31	32
Stadium	A	H	H	A	H	A	H	H	A	H	H	A	H	A	A	H	A	A	H	H	A	H	A	H	A	H	A	A	A	A	H	H
Result	W	W	SO	L	SO	L	SO	W	W	W	W	L	W	SO	W	L	SO	L	W	W	W	W	W	SO	W	W	W	L	L	W	L	SO

Source: FBREF.com
A = Away; H = Home; W = Win; L = Loss; SO = Shootout Win

==== Match reports ====
March 15 1	Miami Fusion	0–2	D.C. United	Fort Lauderdale, Florida
	Herrera (yellow card) 24'; Kooiman (yellow card) 29'	Report	Williams 16'; Aunger (yellow card) 17'; Moreno (red card) 29'; Sanneh 37'; Talley (yellow card) 45'; Etcheverry (yellow card) 61'	Stadium: Lockhart Stadium; Attendance: 20,450; Referee: Brian Hall

March 21 2	D.C. United	3–2	Kansas City Wizards	Washington, D.C.
	Wegerle 13' (pen.), 38'; Olsen (yellow card) 52'; Harkes 75'	Report	Johnston 5', 16'	Stadium: RFK Stadium; Attendance: 18,108; Referee: Kevin Terry

March 29 3	D.C. United	1–1 (3–2 SO)	New England Revolution	Washington, D.C.
	Harkes (yellow card) 12'; Aunger (yellow card) 20'; Etcheverry (yellow card) 64'; Kamler 88'	Report	Baba (yellow card) 52', (goal) 54'	Stadium: RFK Stadium; Attendance: 22,263; Referee: Noel Kenny
	Shootout
	Wegerle (penalty scored); Etcheverry (penalty scored); Moreno (penalty missed); Kamler (penalty scored)		(penalty scored) Baba; (penalty missed) Wise; (penalty missed) Burns; (penalty scored) McKinley; (penalty missed) Díaz Arce

April 4 4	Columbus Crew	2–1	D.C. United	Columbus, Ohio
	John (yellow card) 8'; Lapper 13', (red card) 21'; McBride 56'	Report	Pope (yellow card) 20' (red card) 64'; Moreno 21', (yellow card) 23'	Stadium: Ohio Stadium; Attendance: 14,148; Referee: Tim Weyland

April 11 5	D.C. United	3–3 (2–0 SO)	Colorado Rapids	Washington, D.C.
	Williams 38'; Etcheverry 45', (yellow card) 45'; Moreno 53'; Garlick (yellow card) 83'	Report	Balboa 39', (yellow card) 45'; Vermes 72'; Harris 83' (pen.)	Stadium: RFK Stadium; Attendance: 14,009; Referee: Brian Hall
	Shootout
	Wegerle (penalty scored); Kamler (penalty missed); Etcheverry (penalty scored)		(penalty missed) Paz; (penalty missed) Harris; (penalty missed) Bravo; (penalty missed) Sáenz

April 18 6	New England Revolution	1–1 (3–2 SO)	D.C. United	Foxborough, Massachusetts
	Jair 40'	Report	Etcheverry 33'; Aunger (yellow card) 59'; Pope (yellow card) 80'	Stadium: Foxboro Stadium; Attendance: 24,133; Referee: Kevin Stott
	Shootout
	Baba (penalty scored); McKinley (penalty scored); Burns (penalty missed); Wise (penalty missed); Torres (penalty missed); Keegan (penalty scored)		(penalty scored) Moreno; (penalty missed) Etcheverry; (penalty scored) Wegerle; (penalty missed) Olsen; (penalty missed) Sanneh; (penalty missed) Harkes

April 26 7	D.C. United	1–1 (3–2 SO)	Columbus Crew	Washington, D.C.
	Peay (yellow card) 49'; Agoos (yellow card) 87'; Moreno 89'	Report	John 4'; Iribarren (yellow card) 53'; Warzycha (yellow card) 84'	Stadium: RFK Stadium; Attendance: 11,338; Referee: Paul Tamberino
	Shootout
	Etcheverry (penalty scored); Moreno (penalty missed); Harkes (penalty missed); Sanneh (penalty scored); Agoos (penalty scored)		(penalty missed) Carrera; (penalty scored) Thompson; (penalty missed) John; (penalty missed) Yeagley; (penalty scored) McBride

April 29 8	D.C. United	3–1	San Jose Clash	Washington, D.C.
	Harkes 11', 59'; Williams (yellow card) 21'; Peay (yellow card) 54'; Lassiter 70'	Report	Lozzano 25'; Cerritos (yellow card) 55'; Draguicevich (yellow card) 60'; Figueroa (yellow card) 68'	Stadium: RFK Stadium; Attendance: 9,755; Referee: Marcel Yonan

May 2 9	Chicago Fire	1–3	D.C. United	Chicago, Illinois
	Klopas 9'; Kosecki (red card) 65'	Report	Sanneh (yellow card) 13'; Etcheverry (yellow card) 14', (goal) 86'; Lassiter 19'; Llamosa (yellow card) 25'; Talley (yellow card) 85'; Olsen 88'	Stadium: Soldier Field; Attendance: 27,136; Referee: Reggie Rutty

May 9 10	D.C. United	2–0	MetroStars	Washington, D.C
	Etcheverry 40'; Lassiter 56'	Report	Palacios (yellow card) 89'	Stadium: RFK Stadium; Attendance: 17,027; Referee: Kevin Stott

May 13 11	D.C. United	3–2	New England Revolution	Washington, D.C.
	Olsen 16'; Sanneh 46'; Lassiter 55'	Report	Jair 50'; Chronopoulos 51'	Stadium: RFK Stadium; Attendance: 14,442; Referee: Michael Kennedy

May 16 12	MetroStars	4–3	D.C. United	East Rutherford, New Jersey
	Savarese 21', 64'; Hurtado (yellow card) 38', (goal) 47'; Rooney 42'	Report	Lassiter (yellow card) 12', (goal) 76'; Etcheverry (yellow card) 40'; Sanneh 71'; Williams (yellow card) 83'; Moreno 86'	Stadium: Giants Stadium; Attendance: 15,322; Referee: Noel Kenny

May 23 13	D.C. United	3–2	Tampa Bay Mutiny	Washington, D.C
	Etcheverry 22', (yellow card) 33'; Lassiter 53'; Sanneh 65'	Report	Prampin 29'; Ramos 32'	Stadium: RFK Stadium; Attendance: 16,991; Referee: Esse Baharmast

May 30 14	Tampa Bay Mutiny	1–1 (1–2 SO)	D.C. United	Tampa, Florida
	Houser (yellow card) 21'; Shannon (yellow card) 33'; Gilmar 40', (yellow card) 45'; Ravelli (yellow card) 45'	Report	Lassiter (yellow card) 45'; Williams (yellow card) 57'; Moreno 68'	Stadium: Houlihan's Stadium; Attendance: 8,324; Referee: Robert Sheker
	Shootout
	Jara (penalty missed); Gilmar (penalty missed); Kinnear (penalty scored); Quill (penalty missed); Ramos (penalty missed)		(penalty scored) Moreno; (penalty missed) Kamler; (penalty missed) Sanneh; (penalty scored) Wood; (penalty missed) Lassiter

June 3 15	San Jose Clash	0–4	D.C. United	San Jose, California
	Figueroa (yellow card) 37' (red card) 75'; Doyle (yellow card) 71'; Vásquez (yellow card) 88'	Report	Moreno 41' (pen.); Olsen 54'; Williams 65'; Sanneh 76'; Aunger (yellow card) 81'	Stadium: Spartan Stadium; Attendance: 10,191; Referee: Richard Heron

June 7 16	D.C. United	4–4 (1–3 SO)	Dallas Burn	Washington, D.C.
	Lassiter 19', 70'; Etcheverry 31'; Soehn 88' (o.g.)	Report	Suarez 24'; Farrer 38'; Álvarez 56' (pen.); Trotman 88'	Stadium: RFK Stadium; Attendance: 13,454; Referee: Refugio Ramirez
	Shootout
	Moreno (penalty missed); Etcheverry (penalty missed); Kamler (penalty scored); Sanneh (penalty missed)		(penalty missed) Haynes; (penalty scored) Farrer; (penalty missed) Suarez; (penalty scored) Soehn; (penalty scored) Eck

June 13 17	Columbus Crew	3–3 (3–4 SO)	D.C. United	Columbus, Ohio
	Farrell 7'; John 29' (pen.), (yellow card) 63'; Clark (yellow card) 31'; West 49'; Carrera (yellow card) 59'; Iribarren (yellow card) 81'; Gregor (yellow card) 90'	Report	Harkes 25'; Sanneh (yellow card) 31'; Moreno 37' (pen.); Presthus (yellow card) 45'; Llamosa (yellow card) 61'; Lassiter 67'	Stadium: Ohio Stadium; Attendance: 13,347; Referee: Marcel Yonan
	Shootout
	John (penalty missed); Carrera (penalty missed); Cunningham (penalty scored); Farrell (penalty scored); Elcock (penalty scored); Clark (penalty missed)		(penalty scored) Etcheverry; (penalty missed) Moreno; (penalty scored) Wood; (penalty scored) Sanneh; (penalty missed) Lassiter; (penalty scored) Talley

June 25 18	Colorado Rapids	3–1	D.C. United	Denver, Colorado
	Paule 2', (yellow card) 64'; Paz 20'; Bravo 27'	Report	Peay (yellow card) 45'; Aunger (yellow card) 57'; Moreno (yellow card) 66'; Wood 68'	Stadium: Mile High Stadium; Attendance: 9,132; Referee: Ted Covaciu

July 2 19	D.C. United	3–1	Miami Fusion	Washington, D.C.
	Moreno 40', 55'; Talley (yellow card) 74'; Lassiter 76'	Report	Serna (yellow card) 38' (red card) 43'; Herrera (yellow card) 42'; Vaudreuil 73'; Webber (yellow card) 85'	Stadium: RFK Stadium; Attendance: 13,030; Referee: Rich Grady

July 10 20	D.C. United	3–0	Los Angeles Galaxy	Washington, D.C.
	Harkes 23'; Lassiter 34', (yellow card) 86'; Moreno 49'; Williams (yellow card) 60'	Report	Caligiuri (yellow card) 30'; Hermosillo (red card) 82'	Stadium: RFK Stadium; Attendance: 23,631; Referee: Kevin Stott

July 15 21	New England Revolution	0–1	D.C. United	Foxborough, Massachusetts
	Goulooze (yellow card) 10'; Torres (yellow card) 30'	Report	Lassiter 81'	Stadium: Foxboro Stadium; Attendance: 17,206; Referee: Noel Kenny

July 18 22	D.C. United	4–1	Chicago Fire	Washington, D.C.
	Lassiter 53' (pen.), 69', 90'; Williams (yellow card) 56'; Moreno 78'	Report	Marsch 38', (yellow card) 49'	Stadium: RFK Stadium; Attendance: 16,779; Referee: Esse Baharmast

July 25 23	Los Angeles Galaxy	0–1	D.C. United	Pasadena, California
	Vanney (yellow card) 14'; Pena (yellow card) 24'; Jolley (yellow card) 43'; Wélton (red card) 57'	Report	Gori (yellow card) 7' (yellow-red card) 16'; Etcheverry (yellow card) 31'; Fraser 44' (o.g.); Aunger (yellow card) 60'	Stadium: Rose Bowl; Attendance: 26,873; Referee: Esse Baharmast

July 29 24	D.C. United	2–2 (4–3 SO)	Tampa Bay Mutiny	Washington, D.C.
	Etcheverry (yellow card) 14', (goal) 21', 54'; Harkes (yellow card) 36'; Agoos (red card) 43'	Report	Hejduk (yellow card) 19'; Ralston 62'; Ramos 88'	Stadium: RFK Stadium; Attendance: 11,062; Referee: Brian Hall
	Shootout
	Etcheverry (penalty scored); Moreno (penalty missed); Wood (penalty scored); Harkes (penalty scored); Talley (penalty scored)		(penalty scored) Salcedo; (penalty missed) Young; (penalty scored) Eriksson; (penalty scored) Yallop; (penalty missed) Dougherty

August 7 25	Dallas Burn	0–1	D.C. United	Dallas, Texas
	Dade (yellow card) 15'; Trotman (yellow card) 35'; Rodríguez (yellow card) 48'; Dodd (yellow card) 56'	Report	Lassiter 57' (pen.); Pope (yellow card) 84'	Stadium: Cotton Bowl; Attendance: 9,437; Referee: Ali Saheli

August 22 26	D.C. United	2–1	MetroStars	Washington, D.C.
	Kamler (yellow card) 57'; Moreno 59'; Etcheverry 78'	Report	Petke (yellow card) 35'; Soñora 41'	Stadium: RFK Stadium; Attendance: 16,729; Referee: Brian Hall

August 26 27	Kansas City Wizards	1–2	D.C. United	Kansas City, Missouri
	Preki 21' (pen.); Okafor (yellow card) 71'	Report	Garlick (yellow card) 21'; Pope (yellow card) 22'; Olsen (yellow card) 63'; Etcheverry 72'; Agoos 86'	Stadium: Arrowhead Stadium; Attendance: 6,401; Referee: Alex Prus

August 29 28	Tampa Bay Mutiny	2–2 (1–0 SO)	D.C. United	Tampa, Florida
	Prampin 18'; Kinnear 87'	Report	Lassiter 39'; Pope 85'	Stadium: Houlihan's Stadium; Attendance: 12,670; Referee: Kevin Terry
	Shootout
	Salcedo (penalty missed); Eriksson (penalty missed); Yallop (penalty missed); Shannon (penalty missed); Young (penalty missed); Wise (penalty scored)		(penalty missed) Etcheverry; (penalty missed) Wood; (penalty missed) Aunger; (penalty missed) Gori; (penalty missed) Talley; (penalty missed) Agoos

September 13 29	Miami Fusion	4–3	D.C. United	Fort Lauderdale, Florida
	McLaren 4', 18'; Kmosko (yellow card) 28'; Webber (yellow card) 30'; Gutierrez (yellow card) 34'; Serna 42', 64'; Parra (yellow card) 89'; Valderrama (yellow card) 90'	Report	Moreno 11', 58'; Care (yellow card) 37'; Gori (yellow card) 64'; Harkes 85'	Stadium: Lockhart Stadium; Attendance: 8,255; Referee: Kevin Stott

September 16 30	MetroStars	0–5	D.C. United	East Rutherford, New Jersey
	Meloa (yellow card) 3'; Vega (yellow card) 7' (yellow-red card) 7'; Lalas (yellow card) 58'	Report	Lassiter 4' (pen.); Moreno 15' (pen.); Olsen 36'; Harty 67' (o.g.); Wood 83'; Etcheverry (yellow card) 85'	Stadium: Giants Stadium; Attendance: 14,117; Referee: José María García-Aranda

September 19 31	D.C. United	1–3	Miami Fusion	Washington, D.C.
	Lassiter (yellow card) 16'; Olsen (red card) 35'; Moreno 50'; Harkes (yellow card) 81'	Report	McLaren 18'; Parra (yellow card) 52'; Serna 53', 80'	Stadium: RFK Stadium; Attendance: 23,069; Referee: Paul Tamberino

September 27 32	D.C. United	2–2 (3–2 SO)	Columbus Crew	Washington, D.C.
	Wood 42'; Llamosa (yellow card) 56'; Smith 70' (o.g.)	Report	John 10', 15'; Iribarren (yellow card) 43'	Stadium: RFK Stadium; Attendance: 14,440; Referee: Rich Grady
	Shootout
	Agoos (penalty missed); Wood (penalty scored); Harkes (penalty scored); Aunger (penalty missed); Lassiter (penalty scored)		(penalty scored) West; (penalty missed) McBride; (penalty scored) John; (penalty missed) Williams; (penalty missed) Elcock

=== MLS Cup Playoffs ===
==== Eastern Conference semifinals ====
September 30 Game 1	D.C. United	2–1	Miami Fusion	Washington, D.C.
	Llamosa (yellow card) 18'; Lassiter 28'; Moreno 38'; Agoos (yellow card) 63'	Report	Parra (yellow card) 59'; Serna (yellow card) 63'; McLaren (yellow card) 63', (goal) 69'	Stadium: RFK Stadium; Attendance: 15,187; Referee: Brian Hall

October 4 Game 2	Miami Fusion	0–0 (2–3 SO)	D.C. United	Fort Lauderdale, Florida
	Webber (yellow card) 3'; Parra (yellow card) 25'; Serna (yellow card) 34'	Report	Lassiter (red card) 3'; Williams (yellow card) 71'	Stadium: Lockhart Stadium; Attendance: 13,128; Referee: Tim Weyland
	Shootout
	Gutierrez (penalty scored); Maessner (penalty missed); Vargas (penalty missed); Cullen (penalty scored); Serna (penalty missed); Boyce (penalty missed)		(penalty missed) Wood; (penalty scored) Etcheverry; (penalty scored) Moreno; (penalty missed) Aunger; (penalty missed) Harkes; (penalty scored) Agoos

==== Eastern Conference finals ====
October 11 Game 1	D.C. United	2–0	Columbus Crew	Washington, D.C.
	Sanneh 68'; Etcheverry 78'	Report	Yeagley (yellow card) 53'; Elcock (yellow card) 56'; McBride (yellow card) 73'	Stadium: RFK Stadium; Attendance: 17,755; Referee: Kevin Stott

October 18 Game 2	Columbus Crew	4–2	D.C. United	Columbus, Ohio
	McBride 8', 47'; Dooley (yellow card) 18', (goal) 37'; Smith (yellow card) 29'; Elcock (yellow card) 75'; Iribarren (yellow card) 78'; John 81'	Report	Llamosa (yellow card) 47'; Aunger (yellow card) 62'; Sanneh 65'; Lassiter 77'; Williams (yellow card) 88'	Stadium: Ohio Stadium; Attendance: 13,193; Referee: Rich Grady

October 21 Game 3	D.C. United	3–0	Columbus Crew	Washington, D.C.
	Agoos 12'; Etcheverry (yellow card) 21'; Lassiter 44', 79'	Report	Clark (yellow card) 28'; Farrell (yellow card) 56'	Stadium: RFK Stadium; Attendance: 21,453; Referee: Noel Kenny

==== MLS Cup ====
October 25 MLS Cup	Chicago Fire	2–0	D.C. United	Pasadena, California
	Podbrożny 29'; Razov (yellow card) 31'; Gutiérrez 45', (yellow card) 50'; Marsch (yellow card) 60'	Report	Sanneh (yellow card) 25'; Etcheverry (yellow card) 33'	Stadium: Rose Bowl; Attendance: 51,350; Referee: Kevin Terry

=== CONCACAF Champions' Cup ===
August 11 Quarterfinals	D.C. United (United States)	8–0	(Trinidad and Tobago) Joe Public	Washington, D.C., United States
19:00 UTC−5	Olsen 13', 44'; Lassiter 22', 29', 67', 72'; Wood 75', 90+2'	Report		Stadium: RFK Stadium; Attendance: 7,117

August 14 Semifinals	D.C. United (United States)	2–0	(Mexico) León	Washington, D.C., United States
19:00 UTC−5	Lassiter 12', 61'	Report		Stadium: RFK Stadium

August 16 Final	D.C. United (United States)	1–0	(Mexico) Toluca	Washington, D.C., United States
19:00 UTC−5	Pope 41'; Garlick (yellow card) 74'; Lassiter (yellow card) 89'	Report	Taboada (yellow card) 37'; Estay (yellow card) 41'; Ruiz (yellow card) 58'; Cardozo (yellow card) 86'	Stadium: RFK Stadium; Attendance: 12,607; Referee: Carlos Batres (Guatemala)

=== Copa Interamericana ===
November 14 First leg	D.C. United (United States)	0–1	(Brazil) Vasco da Gama	Washington, D.C., United States
19:00 UTC−5	Pope (yellow card) 17'		Felipe 69'	Stadium: RFK Stadium; Attendance: 25,000; Referee: Carlos Batres (Guatemala)

December 5 Second leg	Vasco da Gama (Brazil)	0–2 (1–2 agg.)	(United States) D.C. United	Fort Lauderdale, United States
20:00 UTC−5	Luizão (yellow card) 7'; Nasa (yellow card) 70'		Moreno (yellow card) 15'; Sanneh 34'; Olsen (yellow card) 59'; Williams (yellow card) 63'; Pope 77'	Stadium: Lockhart Stadium; Attendance: 7,283; Referee: Carlos Batres (Guatemala)
Note: Match was played at Lockhart Stadium in Fort Lauderdale instead of Vasco da Gama's regular home ground, Estádio São Januário, Rio de Janeiro, Brazil.
