= 1998 Major League Soccer season =

3rd season of Major League Soccer

- Season: 1998
- Teams: 12
- MLS Cup: Chicago Fire (1st title)
- Supporters' Shield: Los Angeles Galaxy (1st shield)
- CONCACAF Champions' Cup: Chicago Fire; D.C. United; Los Angeles Galaxy
- Matches: 192
- Goals: 701 (3.65 per match)
- Top goalscorer: Stern John (26 goals)
- Longest winning run: Chicago Fire; Games: 11 (05/16 – 07/09)
- Longest losing run: New England Revolution; Games: 9 (05/13 – 07/04)
- Highest attendance: 56,404; MET 4–2 MIA (May 23, 1998)
- Lowest attendance: 4,130; KC 1–0 CHI (April 8, 1998)
- Total attendance: 2,747,897
- Average attendance: 14,312

Locations of teams for the 1998 Major League Soccer season
Western Conference Eastern Conference

The 1998 Major League Soccer season was the third season of Major League Soccer. It was also the 86th season of FIFA-sanctioned soccer in the United States, and the 20th with a national first-division league.

The Chicago Fire and Miami Fusion played their inaugural seasons as the league's first two expansion teams.

The NY/NJ MetroStars dropped the New York/New Jersey from their name and rebranded as just MetroStars, with no city, state or regional name attached to it.

The regular season began on March 15, and concluded on September 27. The MLS Cup Playoffs began on September 30, and concluded with MLS Cup on October 25. Chicago became the first expansion team to win MLS Cup and the first to win it in its inaugural season.

== Overview ==
=== Season format ===
The season began on March 15 and concluded with MLS Cup on October 25. The 12 teams were split evenly into two conferences. Each team played 32 games that were evenly divided between home and away. Each team played every other team in their conference four times, for a total of 20 games. The remaining schedule consisted of two games against each team from the opposite conference.

The top four teams from each conference qualified for the MLS Cup Playoffs. The conference semifinals and finals were played as a best-of-three series, and the winners advanced to MLS Cup. In all rounds, draws were broken by penalty shootout if necessary. The away goals rule was not used in any round.

The team with the most points in the regular season was awarded the MLS Supporters' Shield and qualified automatically for the CONCACAF Champions' Cup. Additionally, the winner of MLS Cup, and the runner-up, also qualified for the Champions' Cup.

=== Stadiums and locations ===
Team	Stadium	Capacity
Chicago Fire	Soldier Field	66,944
Colorado Rapids	Mile High Stadium	76,273
Columbus Crew	Ohio Stadium	102,329
D.C. United	RFK Stadium	46,000
Dallas Burn	Cotton Bowl	92,100
Kansas City Wizards	Arrowhead Stadium	81,425
Los Angeles Galaxy	Rose Bowl	92,542
MetroStars	Giants Stadium	80,200
Miami Fusion	Lockhart Stadium	20,450
New England Revolution	Foxboro Stadium	60,292
San Jose Clash	Spartan Stadium	30,456
Tampa Bay Mutiny	Houlihan's Stadium	74,301

=== Personnel and sponsorships ===
Team	Head coach	Captain	Shirt sponsor
Chicago Fire	(United States) Bob Bradley		—
Colorado Rapids	(United States) Glenn Myernick		
Columbus Crew	(United States) Tom Fitzgerald		Snickers
D.C. United	(United States) Bruce Arena		MasterCard
Dallas Burn	(United States) Dave Dir		
Kansas City Wizards	(England) Ron Newman		—
Los Angeles Galaxy	(Ecuador) Octavio Zambrano		—
MetroStars	(Federal Republic of Yugoslavia) Bora Milutinović	(United States) Tony Meola	Fujifilm
Miami Fusion	(Brazil) Ivo Wortmann		—
New England Revolution	(Italy) Walter Zenga		—
San Jose Clash	(Republic of Ireland) Brian Quinn	(United States) John Doyle	Honda
Tampa Bay Mutiny	(United States) Tim Hankinson		

=== Coaching changes ===
Team	Outgoing coach	Manner of departure	Date of vacancy	Incoming coach	Date of appointment
Tampa Bay Mutiny	(Poland) John Kowalski	Resigned	June 6, 1998	(United States) Tim Hankinson	June 8, 1998
Miami Fusion	(Argentina) Carlos Cordoba	Fired	July 24, 1998	(Brazil) Ivo Wortmann	July 25, 1998
New England Revolution	(Netherlands) Thomas Rongen	Fired	August 24, 1998	(Italy) Walter Zenga	August 24, 1998
MetroStars	(Spain) Alfonso Mondelo	Fired	September 21, 1998	(Federal Republic of Yugoslavia) Bora Milutinović	September 21, 1998

== Standings ==
=== Eastern Conference ===
Pos	Team	Pld	W	SOW	L	GF	GA	GD	Pts	Qualification
1	D.C. United	32	17	7	8	74	48	+26	58	MLS Cup Playoffs
2	Columbus Crew	32	15	0	17	67	56	+11	45	MLS Cup Playoffs
3	MetroStars	32	12	3	17	54	63	−9	39	MLS Cup Playoffs
4	Miami Fusion	32	10	5	17	46	68	−22	35	MLS Cup Playoffs
5	Tampa Bay Mutiny	32	11	1	20	46	57	−11	34	
6	New England Revolution	32	9	2	21	53	66	−13	29	

Source: MLS

=== Western Conference ===
Pos	Team	Pld	W	SOW	L	GF	GA	GD	Pts	Qualification
1	Los Angeles Galaxy	32	22	2	8	85	44	+41	68	MLS Cup Playoffs
2	Chicago Fire	32	18	2	12	62	45	+17	56	MLS Cup Playoffs
3	Colorado Rapids	32	14	2	16	62	69	−7	44	MLS Cup Playoffs
4	Dallas Burn	32	11	4	17	43	59	−16	37	MLS Cup Playoffs
5	San Jose Clash	32	10	3	19	48	60	−12	33	
6	Kansas City Wizards	32	10	2	20	45	50	−5	32	

Source: MLS

=== Overall standings ===
Pos	Team	Pld	W	SOW	L	GF	GA	GD	Pts	
1	Los Angeles Galaxy (S)	32	22	2	8	85	44	+41	68	Qualification for the CONCACAF Champions' Cup
2	D.C. United	32	17	7	8	74	48	+26	58	Qualification for the CONCACAF Champions' Cup
3	Chicago Fire (C)	32	18	2	12	62	45	+17	56	Qualification for the CONCACAF Champions' Cup
4	Columbus Crew	32	15	0	17	67	56	+11	45	
5	Colorado Rapids	32	14	2	16	62	69	−7	44	
6	MetroStars	32	12	3	17	54	63	−9	39	
7	Dallas Burn	32	11	4	17	43	59	−16	37	
8	Miami Fusion	32	10	5	17	46	68	−22	35	
9	Tampa Bay Mutiny	32	11	1	20	46	57	−11	34	
10	San Jose Clash	32	10	3	19	48	60	−12	33	
11	Kansas City Wizards	32	10	2	20	45	50	−5	32	
12	New England Revolution	32	9	2	21	53	66	−13	29	

Source: MLS
Rules for classification: 1) points; 2) head-to-head record; 3) goal difference; 4) number of goals scored
(C) MLS Cup champions; (S) Supporters' Shield winners

== MLS Cup playoffs ==
=== Bracket ===
- The ties were a best of three series.

Conference semifinals
E1	D.C. United	2	0 (3)	x
E4	Miami	1	0 (2)	x
Eastern Conference
E2	Columbus	5	1 (3)	x
E3	MetroStars	3	1 (2)	x
W1	Los Angeles	6	3	x
W4	Dallas	1	2	x
Western Conference
W2	Chicago	1 (3)	1	x
W3	Colorado	1 (2)	0	x

Conference finals
E1	D.C. United	2	2	3
E2	Columbus	0	4	0
W1	Los Angeles	0	1 (1)	x
W2	Chicago	1	1 (2)	x

MLS Cup
E1	D.C. United	0
W2	Chicago	2

=== Conference semifinals ===
Eastern Conference

September 30, 1998
Game 1

D.C. United	2–1	Miami Fusion
Lassiter 28'; Moreno 38'	Report	McLaren 69'

RFK Stadium, Washington, D.C.
Attendance: 15,187
Referee: Brian Hall
October 4, 1998
Game 2

Miami Fusion	0–0	D.C. United
	Report
Penalties
Gutierrez (penalty scored); Maessner (penalty missed); Vargas (penalty missed); Cullen (penalty scored); Serna (penalty missed); Boyce (penalty missed)	2–3	(penalty missed) Wood; (penalty scored) Etcheverry; (penalty scored) Moreno; (penalty missed) Aunger; (penalty missed) Harkes; (penalty scored) Agoos

Lockhart Stadium, Fort Lauderdale, Florida
Attendance: 13,128
Referee: Tim Weyland
- D.C. United advance 2–0, to the Conference Finals.

September 30, 1998
Game 1

Columbus Crew	5–3	MetroStars
McBride 9', 12'; Smith 33'; Farrell 38'; John 58'	Report	Hurtado 53'; Sorber 60' (pen.); Joseph 80'

Ohio Stadium, Columbus, Ohio
Attendance: 10,996
Referee: Ali Saheli
October 3, 1998
Game 2

MetroStars	1–1	Columbus Crew
Ramos 13'	Report	John 22'
Penalties
Ramos (penalty scored); Savarese (penalty missed); Duhaney (penalty missed); Sorber (penalty scored); Petke (penalty missed)	2–3	(penalty scored) Thompson; (penalty missed) Yeagley; (penalty scored) Dooley; (penalty scored) John; (penalty missed) Williams

Giants Stadium, East Rutherford, New Jersey
Attendance: 11,686
Referee: Michael Kennedy
- Columbus Crew advance 2–0, to the Conference Finals.

Western Conference

October 1, 1998
Game 1

Los Angeles Galaxy	6–1	Dallas Burn
Pena 10', 69'; Hermosillo 16', 32'; Cienfuegos 20'; Wélton 41'	Report	Washington 47'

Rose Bowl, Pasadena, California
Attendance: 10,047
Referee: Ted Covaciu
October 4, 1998
Game 2

Dallas Burn	2–3	Los Angeles Galaxy
Haynes 44'; Kreis 48'	Report	Hendrickson 80'; Caligiuri 85'; Mathis 88'

Cotton Bowl, Dallas, Texas
Attendance: 8,130
Referee: Brian Hall
- Los Angeles Galaxy advance 2–0, to the Conference Finals.

October 1, 1998
Game 1

Chicago Fire	1–1	Colorado Rapids
Kubík 50' (pen.)	Report	Sáenz 79'
Penalties
Kubík (penalty missed); Soehn (penalty scored); Klopas (penalty scored); Wolff (penalty missed); Kuhn (penalty missed); Marsch (penalty scored)	3–2	(penalty scored) Bravo; (penalty missed) Sáenz; (penalty scored) Henderson; (penalty missed) Vaudreuil; (penalty missed) Harris; (penalty missed) Vermes

Soldier Field, Chicago, Illinois
Attendance: 12,610
Referee: Kevin Terry
October 5, 1998
Game 2

Colorado Rapids	0–1	Chicago Fire
	Report	Kubík 24' (pen.)

Mile High Stadium, Denver, Colorado
Attendance: 6,582
Referee: Noel Kenny
- Chicago Fire advance 2–0, to the Conference Finals.

=== Conference finals ===
Eastern Conference

October 11, 1998
Game 1

D.C. United	2–0	Columbus Crew
Sanneh 68'; Etcheverry 78'	Report

RFK Stadium, Washington, D.C.
Attendance: 17,755
Referee: Kevin Stott
October 18, 1998
Game 2

Columbus Crew	4–2	D.C. United
McBride 8', 47'; Dooley 37'; John 81'	Report	Sanneh 65'; Lassiter 77'

Ohio Stadium, Columbus, Ohio
Attendance: 13,193
Referee: Rich Grady
October 21, 1998
Game 3

D.C. United	3–0	Columbus Crew
Agoos 12'; Lassiter 44', 79'	Report

RFK Stadium, Washington, D.C.
Attendance: 21,453
Referee: Noel Kenny
- D.C. United advance 2–1, to MLS Cup

Western Conference

October 10, 1998
Game 1

Los Angeles Galaxy	0–1	Chicago Fire
	Report	Marsch 86'

Rose Bowl, Pasadena, California
Attendance: 25,107
Referee: Kevin Terry
October 16, 1998
Game 2

Chicago Fire	1–1	Los Angeles Galaxy
Nowak 31'	Report	Pena 37'
Penalties
Nowak (penalty missed); Razov (penalty missed); Soehn (penalty missed); Marsch (penalty scored); Podbrożny (penalty scored)	2–1	(penalty missed) Jones; (penalty scored) Wélton; (penalty missed) Machón; (penalty missed) Cienfuegos; (penalty missed) Vanney

Soldier Field, Chicago, Illinois
Attendance: 32,744
Referee: Paul Tamberino
- Chicago Fire advance 2–0, to MLS Cup

=== MLS Cup ===
October 25, 1998

Chicago Fire	2–0	D.C. United
Podbrożny 29'; Gutiérrez 45'	Report

Rose Bowl, Pasadena, California
Attendance: 51,350
Referee: Kevin Terry

== Player statistics ==
=== Goals ===
Rank	Player	Club	Goals
1	(Trinidad and Tobago) Stern John	Columbus Crew	26
2	(United States) Cobi Jones	Los Angeles Galaxy	19
3	(United States) Roy Lassiter	D.C. United	18
3	(El Salvador) Raúl Díaz Arce	New England Revolution	18
5	(Brazil) Wélton	Los Angeles Galaxy	17
6	(Bolivia) Jaime Moreno	D.C. United	16
7	(Venezuela) Giovanni Savarese	MetroStars	14
8	(Jamaica) Wolde Harris	Colorado Rapids	13
8	(El Salvador) Mauricio Cienfuegos	Los Angeles Galaxy	13
8	(El Salvador) Ronald Cerritos	San Jose Clash	13

=== Hat-tricks ===
Player	Club	Against	Result	Date
(Trinidad and Tobago) Stern John	Columbus Crew	Miami Fusion	5–1	April 18
(United States) Cobi Jones	Los Angeles Galaxy	Colorado Rapids	7–4	May 6
(Liberia) Musa Shannon	Tampa Bay Mutiny	New England Revolution	3–4	May 10
(Zimbabwe) Vitalis Takawira	Kansas City Wizards	New England Revolution	3–1	May 16
(Guatemala) Martín Machón	Los Angeles Galaxy	Columbus Crew	3–1	May 17
(Trinidad and Tobago) Stern John	Columbus Crew	Chicago Fire	5–1	May 30
(Armenia) Harut Karapetyan	Los Angeles Galaxy	Dallas Burn	8–1	June 4
(United States) Roy Lassiter	D.C. United	Chicago Fire	4–1	July 18
(United States) Cobi Jones	Los Angeles Galaxy	Colorado Rapids	6–1	August 5
(Trinidad and Tobago) Stern John	Columbus Crew	Kansas City Wizards	5–3	August 16
(United States) Cobi Jones	Los Angeles Galaxy	New England Revolution	5–1	August 22
(Colombia) Diego Serna	Miami Fusion	New England Revolution	3–2	August 30
(United States) Preki	Kansas City Wizards	San Jose Clash	5–1	September 5

=== Assists ===
Rank	Player	Club	Assists
1	(Ecuador) Eduardo Hurtado	MetroStars	14
2	(United States) Marco Etcheverry	D.C. United	13
3	(Poland) Jerzy Podbrożny	Chicago Fire	12
4	(United States) Joe-Max Moore	New England Revolution	11
5	(Uruguay) Adrián Paz	Colorado Rapids	10
6	(El Salvador) Ronald Cerritos	San Jose Clash	9
6	(England) Paul Dougherty	MetroStars	9
6	(United States) Cobi Jones	Los Angeles Galaxy	9
9	10 players		8

=== Clean sheets ===
Rank	Player	Club	Clean sheets
1	(United States) Zach Thornton	Chicago Fire	8
2	(United States) Scott Garlick	D.C. United	7
2	(United States) Kevin Hartman	Los Angeles Galaxy	7
4	(United States) Mark Dodd	Dallas Burn	6
5	(United States) Mike Ammann	Kansas City Wizards	5
5	(United States) Ian Feuer	New England Revolution	5
5	(United States) David Kramer	San Jose Clash	5
8	(United States) Marcus Hahnemann	Colorado Rapids	4
8	(United States) Tony Meola	MetroStars	4
8	(United States) Juergen Sommer	Columbus Crew	4

== Awards ==
=== Individual awards ===
Award	Player	Team
Most Valuable Player	(Bolivia) Marco Etcheverry	D.C. United
Defender of the Year	(Czech Republic) Luboš Kubík	Chicago Fire
Goalkeeper of the Year	(United States) Zach Thornton	Chicago Fire
Coach of the Year	(United States) Bob Bradley	Chicago Fire
Rookie of the Year	(United States) Ben Olsen	D.C. United
Scoring Champion	(Trinidad and Tobago) Stern John	Columbus Crew
Goal of the Year	(United States) Brian McBride	Columbus Crew
Fair Play Award	(United States) Thomas Dooley	Columbus Crew

=== Best XI ===
Goalkeeper	Defenders	Midfielders	Forwards
(United States) Zach Thornton, Chicago	(United States) Thomas Dooley, Columbus (United States) Robin Fraser, LA Galaxy (Czech Republic) Luboš Kubík, Chicago (United States) Eddie Pope, D.C. United	(United States) Chris Armas, Chicago (El Salvador) Mauricio Cienfuegos, LA Galaxy (Bolivia) Marco Etcheverry, D.C. United (Poland) Piotr Nowak, Chicago	(Trinidad and Tobago) Stern John, Columbus (United States) Cobi Jones, LA Galaxy

=== Player of the Month ===
Week	Player	Club
March	(United States) Cobi Jones	Los Angeles Galaxy
April	(United States) Juergen Sommer	Columbus Crew
May	(Poland) Piotr Nowak	Chicago Fire
June	(United States) Ross Paule	Colorado Rapids
July	(United States) Roy Lassiter	D.C. United
August	(Trinidad and Tobago) Stern John	Columbus Crew
September	(Colombia) Diego Serna	Miami Fusion

=== Weekly awards ===
Player of the Week
Week	Player	Club
Week 1	(United States) Cobi Jones	Los Angeles Galaxy
Week 2	(United States) Cobi Jones	Los Angeles Galaxy
Week 3	(United States) Frank Klopas	Chicago Fire
Week 4	(United States) Jason Farrell	Columbus Crew
Week 5	(Trinidad and Tobago) Stern John	Columbus Crew
Week 6	(United States) Paul Bravo	Colorado Rapids
Week 7	(United States) Tony Meola	MetroStars
Week 8	(United States) Cobi Jones	Los Angeles Galaxy
Week 9	(Zimbabwe) Vitalis Takawira	Kansas City Wizards
Week 10	(Poland) Peter Nowak	Chicago Fire
Week 11	(Trinidad and Tobago) Stern John	Columbus Crew
Week 12	(Poland) Jerzy Podbrożny	Chicago Fire
Week 13	(United States) Zach Thornton	Chicago Fire
Week 14	(Poland) Roman Kosecki	Chicago Fire
Week 15	(Czech Republic) Luboš Kubík	Chicago Fire
Week 16	(United States) John Harkes	D.C. United
Week 17	(United States) Roy Lassiter	D.C. United
Week 18	(Bolivia) Marco Etcheverry	D.C. United
Week 19	(United States) Cobi Jones	Los Angeles Galaxy
Week 20	(Trinidad and Tobago) Stern John	Columbus Crew
Week 21	(United States) Cobi Jones	Los Angeles Galaxy
Week 22	(Colombia) Diego Serna	Miami Fusion
Week 23	(Mexico) Carlos Hermosillo	Los Angeles Galaxy
Week 24	(United States) Josh Wolff	Chicago Fire
Week 25	(Colombia) Diego Serna	Miami Fusion

== Attendance ==
Rank	Team	GP	Cumulative	High	Low	Mean
1	Los Angeles Galaxy	16	348,549	53,655	9,113	21,784
2	New England Revolution	16	307,004	35,462	13,074	19,188
3	Chicago Fire	16	286,190	37,122	7,598	17,887
4	MetroStars	16	264,316	56,404	8,826	16,520
5	D.C. United	16	256,127	23,631	9,755	16,008
6	Colorado Rapids	16	236,995	46,722	5,485	14,812
7	San Jose Clash	16	218,450	22,694	9,102	13,653
8	Columbus Crew	16	196,394	15,628	9,166	12,275
9	Dallas Burn	16	175,162	15,280	9,197	11,769
10	Tampa Bay Mutiny	16	164,999	22,704	4,473	10,312
11	Miami Fusion	16	164,548	20,450	6,127	10,284
12	Kansas City Wizards	16	129,163	13,146	4,130	8,073
Total		192	2,747,897	56,404	4,130	14,312
