= R. T. Moore =

R. T. Moore is the name of:

- Robert Thomas Moore (1882–1958), American businessman, ornithologist and philanthropist
- R. T. Moore (soccer) (Ryan T. Moore, born 1976), retired American soccer defender
- Royall T. Moore (1930–2014), mycologist
