= P. J. Brown (soccer) =

American soccer player (born 1973)

Personal information
- Full name: Philip J. Brown
- Date of birth: October 10, 1973 (age 53)
- Place of birth: Spokane, Washington, U.S.
- Height: 6 ft 2 in (1.88 m)
- Position: Defender

Youth career
- 1993–1997: Azusa Pacific

Senior career*
Years	Team	Apps	(Gls)
1998	Colorado Rapids	22	(4)
1999–2001	San Diego Flash	68	(7)
- * Club domestic league appearances and goals

Philip J. Brown is an American retired soccer defender who played professionally in the MLS and the USL A-League.

Brown attended the Azusa Pacific, playing on the men's soccer team from 1994 to 1997. He was a 1996 and 1997 First team All-American NAIA All American. and GSAC CO-Player of the year in 1996. On February 1, 1998, the Colorado Rapids selected Brown in the third round (thirty-fifth overall) of the 1998 MLS College Draft. In 1999, he signed with the San Diego Flash of the USL A-League. He remained with the Flash through the 2001 season. After his retirement, he coached youth soccer.
