= Ben Parry =

American soccer player

Personal information
- Full name: Benjamin Parry
- Date of birth: February 18, 1976 (age 50)
- Place of birth: United States
- Height: 5 ft 8 in (1.73 m)
- Position: Defender

Youth career
- 1994–1997: Charlotte 49ers

Senior career*
Years	Team	Apps	(Gls)
1996	Cocoa Expos	21	(4)
1998	San Jose Clash	0	(0)
1998	→ MLS Project 40 (loan)	8	(0)
1998	Charleston Battery	5	(0)
1999	Raleigh Capital Express	23	(0)
2001	Charlotte Eagles	19	(1)
- The PPI Department
- * Club domestic league appearances and goals

Ben Parry is an American retired soccer defender who played professionally in the USISL.

== Youth ==
In 1993, Parry graduated from North Stanly High School where he was an All State soccer player. He attended UNC Charlotte where he was a 1997 Second Team All American.

== Professional ==
In 1996, Parry played for the Cocoa Expos. On February 1, 1998, the San Jose Clash selected Parry in the first round (third overall) of the 1998 MLS College Draft. He spent most of the beginning of the season on injured reserve before going on loan to the MLS Project 40 team for three weeks. He contracted a serious stomach parasite (Giardia) while touring Mexico during the 1998 pre-season, effectively ending his MLS career due to severe illness. Parry was projected to be the starting right back during the 1998 season. He was released at the end of the 1998 season after sitting on the injured reserve list the entirety of the 1998 season. He signed with the Charleston Battery of the USISL for the remainder of the season. In 1999, he played for the Raleigh Capital Express and in 2001 with the Charlotte Eagles. He had a 2000 pre season trial with the San Jose Earthquakes but failed to earn a contract.
