= Craig Yacks =

American soccer player

Personal information
- Date of birth: March 14, 1976 (age 50)
- Place of birth: Cincinnati, Ohio, United States
- Height: 5 ft 9 in (1.75 m)
- Positions: Forward; midfielder

Youth career
- 1994–1997: Yale Bulldogs

Senior career*
Years	Team	Apps	(Gls)
1997–1999	Cincinnati Riverhawks		
1998	→ Columbus Crew (loan)	0	(0)
2000	El Paso Patriots	8	(3)
2002–2003	Cincinnati Riverhawks	26	(4)
2004–2008	Cincinnati Excite (indoor)		
- * Club domestic league appearances and goals

Craig Yacks (born March 14, 1976) is a retired American soccer player who spent most of his career in the USL A-League.

== Youth ==
In 1994, Yacks graduated from Anderson High School where he was a 1994 Parade Magazine High School All American soccer player. He attended Yale University where he played on the men's soccer team from 1994 to 1997. He holds the Yale single season assists record (set as a senior) and is third on the Yale career assists list. He graduated in 1998.

== Professional ==
In 1997, Yacks began playing for the expansion Cincinnati Riverhawks of the USISL. Yacks and many of his teammates had grown up together playing for the Team Cincinnati youth club. In July 1998, the Columbus Crew called Yacks up for a game against the Dallas Burn. He did not enter the game. On February 7, 1999, the Crew selected Yacks with the last pick (thirty-third overall) in the 1999 MLS Supplemental Draft. The Crew released him during the pre-season and he returned to the Riverhawks. In 2000, Yacks moved to the El Paso Patriots. He was injured during the season and lost the entire 2001 season. In 2002, he returned to the Riverhawks where he played until 2003. In 2004, he moved indoors with the Cincinnati Excite of the American Indoor Soccer League.

== Other pursuits ==
After retiring from professional soccer, Yacks obtained his master's degree in Community Planning from the University of Cincinnati College of Design, Architecture, Art, and Planning.

From 2011 to 2019, Yacks was a hospital administrator for veterinary clinics and emergency and specialty animal hospitals.

Currently, Yacks serves as the director of business development for a network of businesses focusing on the roofing industry.
