= Nick Theslof =

American soccer player

Personal information
- Full name: Nicholas Theslof
- Date of birth: December 12, 1975 (age 50)
- Place of birth: Minnesota, United States
- Positions: Midfielder; forward

Youth career
- –1991: Cleveland Crunch
- 1991–1993: PSV Eindhoven

College career
Years	Team	Apps	(Gls)
1994–1997	UCLA Bruins		

Senior career*
Years	Team	Apps	(Gls)
1998	Columbus Crew	0	(0)
2000	Orange County Waves	21	(1)
2005–2007	Orange County Blue Star	24	(3)

Managerial career
- 1998–2000: Ohio Wesleyan University (assistant)
- 2001–2006: Orange County Blue Star
- 2004: PSV Eindhoven (youth coach)
- 2006: Germany (assistant)
- 2008–2009: Bayern Munich (assistant)
- 2010–2011: Chivas USA (assistant)
- 2012–2013: Ohio Wesleyan University (assistant)
- 2014–2021: Toronto FC (assistant)
- 2021–: LA Galaxy (assistant)
- * Club domestic league appearances and goals

Nick Theslof (born December 12, 1975) is an American soccer manager and coach, who was midfield coach and international scout to Jürgen Klinsmann at Bayern Munich. He is currently an assistant coach for LA Galaxy in Major League Soccer.

He was one of the first and youngest American soccer players to have played in continental Europe, joining PSV Eindhoven's youth side in 1991 and playing there for two years. Coming from a sporting family, his grandparents were leading Swedish figure skater Vivi-Anne Hultén and Finnish figure skater Gene Theslof.

== Biography ==
=== Playing career ===
Having grown up in a family of renowned skaters, with both his grandparents and parents being skaters, Theslof was exposed to sports being a viable career option from a very early age. While his younger brother Tyler initially chose to become an ice hockey goaltender (though he later changed to being a soccer midfielder himself, playing for UC Irvine), Nick was interested in soccer and began playing for the youth indoor soccer club, the Cleveland Crunch. In 1991, his coach at the club, former English striker Ron Wigg, advised then PSV Eindhoven head of youth development Huub Stevens to have a look at Theslof, during a match for which PSV's reserve team had come to Cleveland. Stevens, impressed with Theslof's potential, offered him a youth contract at PSV, which Theslof accepted and moved from his home in Columbus to Eindhoven, the Netherlands. He subsequently played for PSV for the next two years, before his career abruptly ended due to an Achilles injury. He later moved back to the United States and attended UCLA, where he later played for their soccer team, where he was a captain and his performances were lauded. UCLA won the national championship in 1995. On February 1, 1998, the Columbus Crew selected Theslof in the 1998 MLS College Draft, but he was released during the 1998 season without playing a first team game due to a severe achilles injury. Nick moved to the Orange County Waves for the 2000-2003 USL A-League seasons where he was head coach and manager. More than 25 players that were trained by Nick at Blue Star ended up being drafted by the MLS or European teams. In 2005 and 2006, Theslof inserted himself into several Blue Star games.

=== Coaching career ===
Theslof began his coaching career as Dr. Jay Martin's assistant at Ohio Wesleyan University between 1998 and 2000, winning the NCAA Division III national title in 1998. Following his stay at Ohio Wesleyan, Theslof became head coach of the Orange County Blue Star, a team of the American Premier Development League and spent time with Juergen Klinsmann who enjoyed Amateur Soccer in Southern California. During that time, he also coached future American national team players Sacha Kljestan and Sal Zizzo. In 2004, Theslof coached his old club PSV's youth squad in the Netherlands. After Klinsmann became manager of the Germany national team, he appointed Theslof as coach and scout in 2006 during the 2006 FIFA World Cup, where he wrote detailed match summaries and reports for Klinsmann. In February 2008, after he was appointed manager of Bayern Munich, Klinsmann appointed Theslof as a second assistant coach and scout. On April 27, 2009, Klinsmann and his two assistant coaches were released early, even though they had won five of the previous seven league games and were only three points behind league leader VfL Wolfsburg.
