= R. T. Moore (soccer) =

American soccer player

R.T. Moore
Personal information
- Full name: Ryan T. Moore
- Date of birth: January 7, 1976 (age 50)
- Place of birth: Rockford, Illinois, U.S.
- Height: 6 ft 0 in (1.83 m)
- Position: Defender

Youth career
- 1994–1997: Maryland Terrapins

Senior career*
Years	Team	Apps	(Gls)
1998–1999	Tampa Bay Mutiny	19	(0)
1998	→ MLS Pro 40 (loan)	9	(0)
2000	Rockford Raptors		
- * Club domestic league appearances and goals

Ryan T. Moore is an American retired soccer defender who spent a season and a half in Major League Soccer with the Tampa Bay Mutiny.

== Youth ==
Moore played organized soccer first with Rockford United Soccer Club in Rockford, Illinois before joining Chicago Pegasus. He graduated from Boylan Catholic High School in 1993. He attended the University of Maryland, College Park, playing on the men's soccer team from 1994 to 1997. In 1997, as a senior biology major, Moore said that he planned to become a dentist.

== Professional ==
The Tampa Bay Mutiny selected Moore in the third round (34th overall) of the 1998 MLS College Draft. He became a starter his rookie season and continued in the starting line-up in 1999. In July 1999, he announced he was retiring to pursue a career in dentistry. Moore spent the 2000 summer season with the Rockford Raptors of the USL Premier Development League.

In 2003, he played a small part in the movie The Game of Their Lives.
