= Henrik Nebrelius =

Swedish footballer

Personal information
- Date of birth: September 16, 1974 (age 52)
- Place of birth: Sweden
- Height: 5 ft 11 in (1.80 m)
- Position: Striker

Senior career*
Years	Team	Apps	(Gls)
1992	Ystads		
1993–1995	BK Häcken		
1995–1997	University of Tampa		
1999	Ystads		
2000–2002	IFK Malmö		
2006	Ystads		
2009	BW 90 IF		
- * Club domestic league appearances and goals

Henrik "Henke" Nebrelius is a Swedish retired football striker.

== University ==
Nebrelius attended the University of Tampa where he was a 1995 and 1997 NCAA Division II First Team All American soccer player. In October 2003, the Sunshine State Conference named Nebrelius to its Silver Anniversary Men's Soccer Team. In 2004, the University of Tampa inducted Nebrelius into its Athletic Hall of Fame.

== Professional ==
On February 1, 1998, the Columbus Crew selected Nebrelius in the second round (twenty-fourth overall) of the 1998 MLS College Draft. In December 2008, he signed with BW 90 IF.
