= 1998 MLS College Draft =

College draft for soccer teams

The 1998 Major League Soccer College Draft was held in Fort Lauderdale, Florida on January 31 and February 1, 1998. The College Draft was followed by the 1998 MLS Supplemental Draft.

== Format ==
On Saturday, January 31, 1998, Major League Soccer held the first round of its 1998 college draft during the halftime of the Umbro Select All-Star Classic at Lockhart Stadium. The second and third rounds took place Sunday morning at the Airport Hilton in Fort Lauderdale. The 1998 MLS Supplemental Draft took place that afternoon at the same location.

== Changes from 1997 ==
- 1998 expansion teams Miami Fusion and Chicago Fire were awarded the first and second selections in each round.

*	Denotes player who has been selected for an MLS Best XI team

== Round 1 ==
Pick #	MLS team	Player	Position	Affiliation
1	Miami Fusion	Leo Cullen	D	University of Maryland
2	Chicago Fire	Ritchie Kotschau	D	George Mason
3	San Jose Clash	Ben Parry	D	UNC-Charlotte
4	Kansas City Wizards (Note: #4: MetroStars → Kansas City Wizards. 3 February 1997: Kansas City Wizards acquired this first-round pick and midfielder Damian Silvera from MetroStars in exchange for midfielder Mike Sorber.)	Chris Klein	M	Indiana University
5	New England Revolution	Johnny Torres	M	Creighton University
6	Los Angeles Galaxy	Clint Mathis	M	University of South Carolina
7	Tampa Bay Mutiny	Josh Keller	M	UCLA
8	MetroStars (Note: #8: Kansas City Wizards → MetroStars. 31 January 1998: MetroStars acquired this first-round selection from Kansas City Wizards in exchange for defender Brian Bliss.)	Mike Petke	D	Southern Connecticut State
9	Columbus Crew	Jeff Cunningham	F	University of South Florida
10	Dallas Burn	Matt Jordan	GK	Clemson University
11	Colorado Rapids	Tyrone Marshall	F	Florida International University
12	San Jose Clash (Note: #12: D.C. United → San Jose Clash. 15 May 1997: San Jose Clash acquired this first-round pick and defender Arnold Cruz from D.C. United in exchange for defender Benedict Iroha.)	Wade Barrett	M	William & Mary College

== Round 2 ==
Pick #	MLS team	Player	Position	Affiliation
13	Miami Fusion	Pablo Mastroeni	M	North Carolina State University
14	D.C. United (Note: #14: Chicago Fire → D.C. United. 6 January 1998: D.C. United acquired this second-round selection and forward A.J. Wood from Chicago Fire in exchange for a first-round pick (#11) in the 1999 MLS College Draft, a second-round pick (#23) in the 1999 College Draft (both picks originally "future considerations"), and midfielder Jesse Marsch.)	Carey Talley	M	University of North Carolina at Chapel Hill
15	MetroStars (Note: #15: San Jose Clash → MetroStars. 31 January 1998: MetroStars acquired this second-round pick from San Jose Clash in exchange for midfielder Braeden Cloutier.)	Joe Munoz	F	Cal State-Bakersfield
16	MetroStars	Billy Walsh	M	Rutgers University
17	New England Revolution	Jesse Van Saun	F	St. John's University
18	Los Angeles Galaxy	Daniel Hernandez	M	Southern Methodist University
19	Tampa Bay Mutiny	Chris Houser	D	Southern Connecticut State
20	Kansas City Wizards	Tom Hardy	D	Seattle University
21	Columbus Crew	Andrew Gregor	M	University of Portland
22	Dallas Burn	Hans Wittusen	D	Brown University
23	Colorado Rapids	Jason Boyce	F	University of Washington
24	Columbus Crew (Note: #24: D.C. United → Columbus Crew. Date Needed: Columbus Crew acquired this second-round selection from D.C. United in exchange for a second-round pick (#21) in the 1999 MLS College Draft. More information needed.)	Henrik Nebrelius	F	University of Tampa

== Round 3 ==
Pick #	MLS team	Player	Position	Affiliation
25	Dallas Burn (Note: #25: Miami Fusion → Dallas Burn. Date Needed: Dallas Burn acquired this third-round selection from Miami Fusion in exchange for a second-round pick (#18) in the 1999 MLS College Draft. More information needed.)	Matt Caution	F	Southwest Missouri State University
26	Los Angeles Galaxy (Note: #26: Chicago Fire → Los Angeles Galaxy. Date Needed: Los Angeles Galaxy acquired this third-round selection from Chicago Fire in exchange for a second-round pick (#16) in the 1998 MLS Supplemental Draft. More information needed.)	Matt Reis	GK	UCLA
27	San Jose Clash	Caleb Porter	M	Indiana University
28	MetroStars	Cesidio Colasante	F	La Salle University
29	New England Revolution	Kevin Coye	D	UCLA
30	Los Angeles Galaxy	Joe Franchino	D	University of Washington
31	Tampa Bay Mutiny	Bill May	GK	University of Washington
32	Kansas City Wizards	Mario Sanchez	M	Fresno State
33	Columbus Crew	Nick Theslof	M	UCLA
34	Tampa Bay Mutiny (Note: #34: Dallas Burn → Tampa Bay Mutiny. 31 January 1997: Tampa Bay Mutiny acquired this third-round selection and a first-round pick (#6) in the 1997 MLS Supplemental Draft from Dallas Burn in exchange for forward Peter Hattrup.)	R.T. Moore	D	University of Maryland
35	Colorado Rapids	P.J. Brown	D	Azusa Pacific
36	New England Revolution (Note: #36: D.C. United. → New England Revolution. Date Needed: New England Revolution acquired this third-round selection from D.C. United in exchange for a first-round selection in the 1998 MLS Supplemental Draft. More information needed.)	Tom McLaughlin	F	Harvard University

== Notable undrafted players ==
- Joe Cannon (GK, UC Santa Barbara) — 86 career MLS shutouts; MLS Goalkeeper of the Year (2002, 2004)
- Jimmy Conrad (DF, UCLA) — 288 MLS appearances, MLS Best XI (2004, 2005, 2006, 2008)
