= Arley Palacios =

Colombian footballer (born 1973)

Personal information
- Full name: José Arley Palacios Palacios
- Date of birth: 10 June 1973 (age 53)
- Place of birth: Chigorodó, Colombia
- Height: 1.85 m (6 ft 1 in)
- Position: Defender

Senior career*
Years	Team	Apps	(Gls)
1994–1997	Independiente Medellín		
1998–1999	MetroStars		
1999	Miami Fusion		
2000	Atlético Nacional		
2001–2002	Xiamen Blue Lions		
2003	Sichuan Guancheng		
2004	Xiamen Blue Lions		
2004	Independiente Medellín		
2005	Envigado		
2006	Macará		
2007	Boyacá Chicó		
2008	Atlético Bucaramanga		
2009	América de Cali		
2009–2010	Patriotas		
- * Club domestic league appearances and goals

José Arley Palacios Palacios (born 10 June 1973) is a retired Colombian football defender. He played in the United States' Major League Soccer, China and Ecuador in addition to his domestic top flight.
