= Chris Houser =

American soccer player

Personal information
- Date of birth: March 9, 1973 (age 53)
- Place of birth: Pierre, South Dakota, U.S.
- Height: 6 ft 4 in (1.93 m)
- Position: Defender

Youth career
- 1995–1997: Southern Connecticut Owls

Senior career*
Years	Team	Apps	(Gls)
1998–2001	Tampa Bay Mutiny	36	(1)
1999	→ MLS Pro 40 (loan)	2	(0)
2000	→ MLS Pro 40 (loan)	3	(0)
2002	Connecticut Wolves	6	(1)
2002	Western Mass Pioneers	6	(1)
- * Club domestic league appearances and goals

Chris Houser (born March 9, 1973) is an American retired soccer defender who played professionally in Major League Soccer. Since retiring from soccer, he has built a career in sales and marketing.

== Youth ==
Born in Pierre, Houser grew up in Sioux Falls, South Dakota. When he turned eight, his stepfather was assigned to Germany, where Houser began playing soccer. He later returned to Sioux Falls, where he graduated from high school. He spent a year working and playing with a local amateur team. His father then paid for him to attend the Vogelsinger Academy where he played well enough to gain an invitation to play for the Vogelsinger team as it toured Belgium. He gained a trial with a local club but his finances did not allow him to stay in Belgium. He returned to South Dakota, where he earned enough to return to Belgium but did not gain a contract. However, the coach of the Southern Connecticut State University had seen him play at with the Vogelsinger team and offered him a scholarship. He played soccer for the Owls from 1994 to 1997. In 1995, Houser and his teammates won the NCAA Men's Division II Soccer Championship. In 1997, he played for the Bridgeport Italians who went to the second round of the 1997 U.S. Open Cup. That year, he also played for the U.S. team which placed third at the World University Games. Houser was inducted into the South Dakota Soccer Hall of Fame in 2007.

== Professional ==
On February 1, 1998, the Tampa Bay Mutiny selected Houser in the second round (nineteenth overall) of the 1998 MLS College Draft. He became a regular on the Mutiny's back line and tied for the league lead in blocks but was sidelined in 1999 with an attack of colitis. He returned in 2000, but played only a handful of games due to a series of injuries. The Mutiny sent him on loan to MLS Pro 40 for three games in 2000. Houser remained with the Mutiny until he and the team agreed to terminate his contract in September 2001 after having his colon removed. In April 2002, he signed with the Connecticut Wolves of the USL A-League. He scored in the opening game for the Wolves, but by June 2002, he was with the Western Mass Pioneers.
