= Stern John =

Trinidadian footballer (born 1976)

Stern John CM
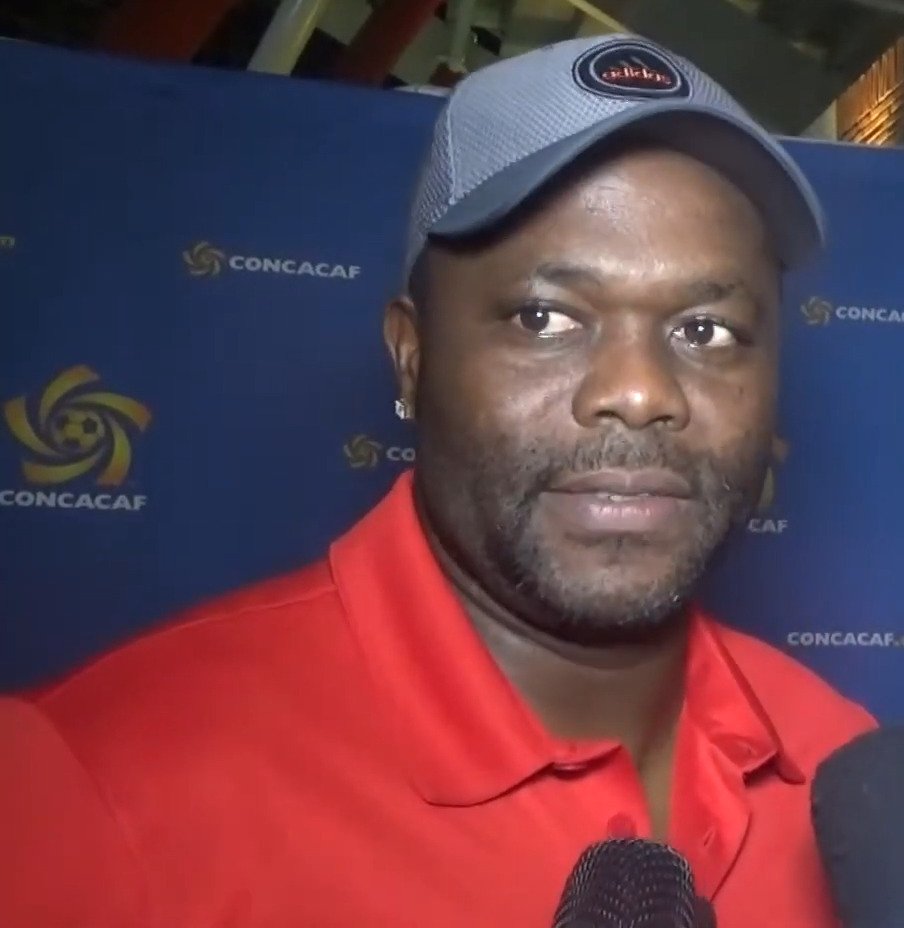
- John in 2018

Personal information
- Full name: Stern John
- Date of birth: 30 October 1976 (age 50)
- Place of birth: Tunapuna, Trinidad and Tobago
- Height: 1.80 m (5 ft 11 in)
- Position: Forward

Team information
- Current team: Grenada (manager)

College career
Years	Team	Apps	(Gls)
1995	Mercer County Vikings		

Senior career*
Years	Team	Apps	(Gls)
1996	Malta Carib Alcons	7	(1)
1997	Carolina Dynamo	5	(0)
1997	New Orleans Riverboat Gamblers	26	(16)
1998–1999	Columbus Crew	55	(44)
1999–2002	Nottingham Forest	72	(18)
2002–2004	Birmingham City	77	(16)
2004–2007	Coventry City	78	(26)
2005	→ Derby County (loan)	7	(0)
2007	Sunderland	16	(5)
2007–2009	Southampton	47	(19)
2008–2009	→ Bristol City (loan)	24	(2)
2009–2010	Crystal Palace	16	(2)
2009–2010	→ Ipswich Town (loan)	7	(1)
2011–2012	North East Stars	6	(1)
2012	Solihull Moors	0	(0)
2014	WASA FC	10+	(5)
2017–2018	Central F.C.		(0)
Total		453	(156)

International career
1995–2011	Trinidad and Tobago	115	(70)

Managerial career
- 2017–2020: Central F.C.
- 2020–2022: Anguilla
- 2022–2026: Saint Lucia
- 2026–: Grenada
- * Club domestic league appearances and goals

Stern John (born 30 October 1976) is a Trinidadian football manager and former player who has managed Grenada since 2026. He managed Anguilla from 2020 to 2022. He previously played for a number of American and English football clubs that included Columbus Crew, Nottingham Forest, Birmingham City, Coventry City, Derby County, Sunderland, Southampton, Bristol City, Crystal Palace and Ipswich Town. He is the all-time Central American/Caribbean men's top goal scorer in international football with 70 goals.

== Club career ==
=== Early US career ===
John moved to the United States in 1995 to attend New Jersey's Mercer County Community College. He had been recruited in Trinidad by the college's head coach, Charlie Inverso, who had previously sought international talent. John led the Mercer County Vikings to the 1995 NJCAA soccer championship and scored 27 goals, including one in the final against Yavapai College.

He made his professional debut for the Carolina Dynamo of the A-League, the second division of U.S. club soccer, in April 1997 while on loan from the Trinidad and Tobago Football Association. John was traded to the New Orleans Riverboat Gamblers for Jamie Wellington a month later, having not scored a goal in five appearances for Carolina. With New Orleans, where he was paired with fellow Trinidadian forward Mickey Trotman, John scored 16 goals in 21 appearances and was named Rookie of the Year.

John was invited by the New England Revolution to their 1998 preseason camp, but was not retained after his trial. Following the 1998 CONCACAF Gold Cup, where he scored two goals, John was invited for a walk-on trial by the Columbus Crew. His second cousin Ansil Elcock, a fellow Trinidad and Tobago international who had been signed by the Crew, had recommended John to head coach Tom Fitzgerald. Following a successful trial, John was signed and made his Major League Soccer debut on 29 March 1998 against the Dallas Burn, where he replaced Elcock but failed to score. He scored his first MLS goal in his fifth appearance, a 5–1 victory over the Miami Fusion, and ended the match with a hat-trick and an assist. John ended his rookie MLS season as the league scoring champion with 26 goals in 27 matches and a place in the MLS Best XI. He was the first MLS player to score three hat-tricks in a single season, including 16 goals in a span of 12 matches.

He scored 18 goals in the 1999 season, tied for the league's scoring leaderboard, and attracted interest from European clubs but declined a mid-season transfer. He ended his MLS career with 44 goals in 55 matches.

=== Nottingham Forest ===
After the 1999 season with Columbus, John was acquired by Nottingham Forest of the English First Division for a fee of £1.5 million. John scored on his debut in a 2-0 win over Portsmouth in November 1999. However, eventual financial difficulties at Forest following the team's failed bid at promotion forced John's sale to Birmingham City in February 2002, then pushing for promotion to the Premier League, for the sum of £100,000. John scored 18 goals in 49 starts for Forest.

=== Birmingham City ===
At Birmingham, John scored nine goals in 60 Premier League appearances in two full seasons and was effective with his hold up play and also had some memorable moments in the blue shirt of Birmingham. These included the winning goal on his debut against Barnsley; his turn and finish away at West Ham in 2002; his last minute equaliser at Villa Park in the Birmingham derby; and his last minute goal away at Millwall which put Birmingham through to the Playoff Final in 2002. He then scored one of the penalties in the play-off final shootout to help them get promoted to the Premier League. Popular with the Birmingham fans for his goals, he nonetheless fell out of favour with management, and was sold to Coventry City on 14 September 2004.

=== Coventry City ===
In his first season with Coventry, John finished second in team scoring with 12 goals despite starting in barely half of Coventry's games. He also scored a debut goal at his third club in a row, this time in a 2-2 draw with Gillingham.

=== Derby County ===
At the start of the 2005–06 season, following the signing of James Scowcroft, John found himself outside of manager Micky Adams's first-team plans. As a result, he was loaned to Derby County on 16 September 2005. He rejoined Coventry three months later.

=== Sunderland ===
On 29 January 2007, John was transferred to Sunderland for an undisclosed fee. The signing was Sunderland manager Roy Keane's sixth signing of the 2006–07 season January transfer window. He made his debut against the club he had just left, and then scored his first goals against Southend United in a 4–0 victory on 17 February 2007.

=== Southampton ===
On 29 August 2007, John moved to Southampton as part of a deal that took his international teammate Kenwyne Jones in the opposite direction.

He scored his first goals with two in a 3–2 win against West Bromwich Albion on 6 October 2007. From then on he scored regularly for "The Saints", with nine goals in his first fifteen appearances, including a second half hat trick against Hull City on 8 December 2007. He finished the 2007–08 season fourth highest scorer in the Championship with 19 goals for Southampton. (He had also scored once for Sunderland in the Premier League prior to his transfer.) Before being sent off for a second bookable offence, John scored two goals, including the match winner, in Southampton's final game of the season against Sheffield United, as the Saints narrowly avoided relegation to League One.

=== Bristol City ===
John was loaned to Bristol City in October 2008 until the end of the 2008–09 season. John made his first Bristol City appearance, coming on as a substitute, against Barnsley in a 0–0 draw. John scored his first goal for Bristol City in a 4–1 defeat to Reading at Ashton Gate Stadium on 1 November 2008.

=== Crystal Palace ===
On 29 July 2009, John signed for Crystal Palace on a year-long deal after turning down an offer to stay at Southampton. He made his debut on the opening day of the season against Plymouth Argyle, he had to come off after 35 minutes due to an injury. He returned in mid-October, but joined Ipswich Town on a one-month loan at the end of November. He scored his first goal for Ipswich in a 3–2 win over Coventry City on 16 January 2010. Upon his return to Palace he scored his first goal for the club in a 3–1 win at Watford on 30 March 2010. New Palace manager George Burley had hoped to discuss the player's future at the end of the season, but no discussion occurred, and John left the club.

=== Solihull Moors ===
In August 2012, after two seasons out of English football, John returned, signing for Solihull Moors. He did not make an appearance in any competition for the club.

=== WASA FC ===
John retired and moved back to his native Trinidad and Tobago after his spell at Solihull Moors. He came out of retirement a second time in order to join WASA FC of the National Super League of Trinidad and Tobago in January 2014. He scored on his debut

=== Central F.C. ===
John came out of retirement once again in 2016 when he was appointed as player-coach of Central F.C. in the TT Pro League.

== International career ==
John made his international debut for Trinidad and Tobago national team on 15 February 1995 against Finland in a friendly at the Queen's Park Oval, scoring one goal on his debut. He was a vital player for the "Soca Warriors" and remains the team's all-time leading scorer with 70 goals in 115 caps. He was also the 7th highest international goalscorer at the time of his retirement in 2011. He is also the all-time top CONCACAF goal scorer.

John was instrumental in helping his country qualify for the 2006 FIFA World Cup and played in all three of his country's World Cup group matches at Germany 2006. In Germany, he scored an offside goal. He was also named Trinidad and Tobago Football Federation Player of the Year in 2002. John is currently the second most capped Trinidad and Tobago international behind former teammate Angus Eve. He was the only player to score in 12 consecutive international matches, from 1998 to 1999.

== Coaching career ==
On 9 November 2020, John become the new manager of the Anguilla national team. On 23 May 2022, the Saint Lucia Football Association announced that John had taken over as head coach of the Saint Lucia national team.. In July 2026 he announced that he was stepping down as head coach of Saint Lucia On August 18th 2026 he was announced as the Grenadian National team coach, the island of his mother's birth.

== Personal life ==
John was born in Tunapuna, Trinidad and Tobago, to a sporting family that included several professional footballers and cricket players. He played on the Trinidad and Tobago cricket youth national team until age 16, when he switched to playing soccer full-time.

As a member of the squad that competed at the 2006 FIFA World Cup in Germany, John was awarded the Chaconia Medal (Gold Class), the second highest state decoration of Trinidad and Tobago.

== Career statistics ==
=== Club ===
Appearances and goals by club, season and competition
Club	Season	League			National cup (Note: Includes U.S. Open Cup, FA Cup)		League cup (Note: Includes MLS Cup Playoffs, Football League Cup)		Other		Total	
Club	Season	Division	Apps	Goals	Apps	Goals	Apps	Goals	Apps	Goals	Apps	Goals
Columbus Crew	1998	Major League Soccer	27	26	3	1	5	3	2	0	35	30
Columbus Crew	1999	Major League Soccer	28	18	2	2	5	5	0	0	35	25
Columbus Crew	Total		55	44	5	3	10	8	2	0	75	58
Nottingham Forest	1999–2000	First Division	17	3	3	0	—		—		20	3
Nottingham Forest	2000–01	First Division	29	2	1	0	2	1	—		32	3
Nottingham Forest	2001–02	First Division	26	13	1	0	1	1	—		28	14
Nottingham Forest	Total		72	18	5	0	3	2	—		80	20
Birmingham City	2001–02	First Division	15	7	—		—		3 (Note: Appearances in Football League play-offs)	1	18	8
Birmingham City	2002–03	Premier League	30	5	1	1	1	3	—		32	9
Birmingham City	2003–04	Premier League	29	4	2	0	1	0	—		32	4
Birmingham City	2004–05	Premier League	3	0	—		—		—		3	0
Birmingham City	Total		77	16	3	1	2	3	3	1	85	21
Coventry City	2004–05	Championship	30	11	2	1	1	0	—		33	12
Coventry City	2005–06	Championship	25	10	3	1	1	0	—		29	11
Coventry City	2006–07	Championship	23	5	2	1	1	0	—		26	6
Coventry City	Total		78	26	7	3	3	0	—		88	29
Derby County (loan)	2005–06	Championship	7	0	—		—		—		7	0
Sunderland	2006–07	Championship	15	4	—		—		—		15	4
Sunderland	2007–08	Premier League	1	1	—		0	0	—		1	1
Sunderland	Total		16	5	—		0	0	—		16	5
Southampton	2007–08	Championship	40	19	2	0	—		—		42	19
Southampton	2008–09	Championship	7	0	—		3	1	—		10	1
Southampton	Total		47	19	2	0	3	1	—		52	20
Bristol City (loan)	2008–09	Championship	24	2	2	0	—		—		26	2
Crystal Palace	2009–10	Championship	16	2	—		0	0	—		16	2
Ipswich Town (loan)	2009–10	Championship	7	1	2	0	—		—		9	1
Career total			399	133	26	7	21	14	5	1	454	158

=== International ===
Appearances and goals by national team and year
National team	Year	Apps	Goals
Trinidad and Tobago	1995	2	1
Trinidad and Tobago	1996	8	5
Trinidad and Tobago	1997	2	1
Trinidad and Tobago	1998	11	13
Trinidad and Tobago	1999	8	9
Trinidad and Tobago	2000	4	0
Trinidad and Tobago	2001	18	9
Trinidad and Tobago	2002	2	1
Trinidad and Tobago	2003	5	5
Trinidad and Tobago	2004	11	10
Trinidad and Tobago	2005	20	9
Trinidad and Tobago	2006	10	3
Trinidad and Tobago	2008	6	2
Trinidad and Tobago	2009	3	0
Trinidad and Tobago	2011	5	1
Total		115	70

Scores and results list Trinidad and Tobago's goal tally first, score column indicates score after each John goal.

List of international goals scored by Stern John
No.	Date	Venue	Opponent	Result	Competition
1	15 February 1995	Port of Spain, Trinidad and Tobago	Finland	2–1	Friendly
2	6 March 1996	Miami, United States	Haiti	2–0	Friendly
3	2 June 1996	Port of Spain, Trinidad and Tobago	Martinique	2–1	1996 Caribbean Cup (Note: Matches against Martinique and Guadeloupe are not considered full internationals by FIFA.)
4	23 June 1996	Port of Spain, Trinidad and Tobago	Dominican Republic	8–0	1998 World Cup qualifier
5	23 June 1996	Port of Spain, Trinidad and Tobago	Dominican Republic	8–0	1998 World Cup qualifier
6	23 June 1996	Port of Spain, Trinidad and Tobago	Dominican Republic	8–0	1998 World Cup qualifier
7	18 December 1997	Fort-de-France, Martinique	Martinique	2–3	Friendly
8	4 January 1998	Bridgetown, Barbados	Barbados	1–0	Friendly
9	1 February 1998	Oakland, United States	Honduras	3–1	1998 CONCACAF Gold Cup
10	1 February 1998	Oakland, United States	Honduras	3–1	1998 CONCACAF Gold Cup
11	22 July 1998	Port of Spain, Trinidad and Tobago	Antigua and Barbuda	3–2	1998 Caribbean Cup
12	24 July 1998	Port of Spain, Trinidad and Tobago	Martinique	2–1	1998 Caribbean Cup
13	24 July 1998	Port of Spain, Trinidad and Tobago	Martinique	2–1	1998 Caribbean Cup
14	26 July 1998	Port of Spain, Trinidad and Tobago	Dominica	8–0	1998 Caribbean Cup
15	26 July 1998	Port of Spain, Trinidad and Tobago	Dominica	8–0	1998 Caribbean Cup
16	26 July 1998	Port of Spain, Trinidad and Tobago	Dominica	8–0	1998 Caribbean Cup
17	26 July 1998	Port of Spain, Trinidad and Tobago	Dominica	8–0	1998 Caribbean Cup
18	29 July 1998	Port of Spain, Trinidad and Tobago	Haiti	4–1	1998 Caribbean Cup
19	29 July 1998	Port of Spain, Trinidad and Tobago	Haiti	4–1	1998 Caribbean Cup
20	31 July 1998	Port of Spain, Trinidad and Tobago	Jamaica	1–2	1998 Caribbean Cup
21	28 March 1999	Port of Spain, Trinidad and Tobago	Jamaica	2–0	Friendly
22	6 May 1999	Port of Spain, Trinidad and Tobago	South Africa	2–0	Friendly
23	3 June 1999	Port of Spain, Trinidad and Tobago	Jamaica	1–0	1999 Caribbean Cup
24	11 June 1999	Port of Spain, Trinidad and Tobago	Haiti	6–1	1999 Caribbean Cup
25	13 June 1999	Port of Spain, Trinidad and Tobago	Cuba	2–1	1999 Caribbean Cup
26	8 September 1999	Miami, United States	Colombia	4–3	Friendly
27	8 September 1999	Miami, United States	Colombia	4–3	Friendly
28	8 September 1999	Miami, United States	Colombia	4–3	Friendly
29	17 November 1999	Tegucigalpa, Honduras	Honduras	2–3	Friendly
30	17 November 1999	Tegucigalpa, Honduras	Honduras	2–3	Friendly
31	25 February 2001	Grand Cayman, Cayman Islands	Cayman Islands	3–0	Friendly
32	15 May 2001	Malabar, Trinidad and Tobago	Barbados	5–0	2001 Caribbean Cup
33	15 May 2001	Malabar, Trinidad and Tobago	Barbados	5–0	2001 Caribbean Cup
34	22 May 2001	Port of Spain, Trinidad and Tobago	Cuba	2–0	2001 Caribbean Cup
35	16 June 2001	Port of Spain, Trinidad and Tobago	Honduras	2–4	2002 World Cup qualifier
36	23 June 2001	Prospect, Bermuda	Bermuda	5–0	Friendly
37	23 June 2001	Prospect, Bermuda	Bermuda	5–0	Friendly
38	30 June 2001	Port of Spain, Trinidad and Tobago	Jamaica	1–2	2002 World Cup qualifier
39	7 October 2001	San Pedro Sula, Honduras	Honduras	1–0	2002 World Cup qualifier
40	20 January 2002	Miami, United States	Costa Rica	1–1	2002 CONCACAF Gold Cup
41	26 March 2003	Port of Spain, Trinidad and Tobago	Antigua and Barbuda	2–0	2003 CONCACAF Gold Cup qualifier
42	28 March 2003	Tunapuna, Trinidad and Tobago	Guadeloupe	1–0	2003 CONCACAF Gold Cup qualifier
43	30 March 2003	Marabella, Trinidad and Tobago	Cuba	1–3	2003 CONCACAF Gold Cup qualifier
44	3 July 2003	Port of Spain, Trinidad and Tobago	Venezuela	2–2	Friendly
45	3 July 2003	Port of Spain, Trinidad and Tobago	Venezuela	2–2	Friendly
46	31 March 2004	Cairo, Egypt	Egypt	1–2	Friendly
47	23 May 2004	West Bromwich, England	Iraq	2–0	Friendly
48	23 May 2004	West Bromwich, England	Iraq	2–0	Friendly
49	30 May 2004	Edinburgh, Scotland	Scotland	1–4	Friendly
50	13 June 2004	Santo Domingo, Dominican Republic	Dominican Republic	4–0	2006 World Cup qualifier
51	13 June 2004	Santo Domingo, Dominican Republic	Dominican Republic	4–0	2006 World Cup qualifier
52	4 September 2004	Basseterre, Saint Kitts and Nevis	Saint Kitts and Nevis	2–1	2006 World Cup qualifier
53	8 September 2004	Port of Spain, Trinidad and Tobago	Mexico	1–3	2006 World Cup qualifier
54	13 June 2004	Marabella, Trinidad and Tobago	Saint Kitts and Nevis	5–1	2006 World Cup qualifier
55	13 June 2004	Marabella, Trinidad and Tobago	Saint Kitts and Nevis	5–1	2006 World Cup qualifier
56	3 February 2005	Port of Spain, Trinidad and Tobago	Haiti	2–1	Friendly
57	25 May 2005	Port of Spain, Trinidad and Tobago	Bermuda	4–0	Friendly
58	27 May 2005	Marabella, Trinidad and Tobago	Bermuda	1–0	Friendly
59	4 June 2005	Port of Spain, Trinidad and Tobago	Panama	2–0	2006 World Cup qualifier
60	3 September 2005	Port of Spain, Trinidad and Tobago	Guatemala	3–2	2006 World Cup qualifier
61	3 September 2005	Port of Spain, Trinidad and Tobago	Guatemala	3–2	2006 World Cup qualifier
62	8 October 2005	Panama City, Panama	Panama	1–0	2006 World Cup qualifier
63	12 October 2005	Port of Spain, Trinidad and Tobago	Mexico	2–1	2006 World Cup qualifier
64	12 October 2005	Port of Spain, Trinidad and Tobago	Mexico	2–1	2006 World Cup qualifier
65	27 May 2006	Graz, Austria	Wales	1–2	Friendly
66	7 October 2006	Port of Spain, Trinidad and Tobago	Saint Vincent and the Grenadines	5–0	Friendly
67	7 October 2006	Port of Spain, Trinidad and Tobago	Saint Vincent and the Grenadines	5–0	Friendly
68	15 June 2008	Tunapuna, Trinidad and Tobago	Bermuda	1–2	2010 World Cup qualifier
69	22 June 2008	Hamilton, Bermuda	Bermuda	2–0	2010 World Cup qualifier
70	21 August 2011	Port of Spain, Trinidad and Tobago	India	3–0	Friendly

== Honours ==
Columbus Crew

- U.S. Open Cup runner-up: 1998

Birmingham City

- Football League First Division play-offs: 2002

Sunderland

- Football League Championship: 2006–07

Trinidad and Tobago

- Caribbean Cup: 1996, 1999, 2001

Individual

- MLS Golden Boot: 1998
- MLS Best XI: 1998
- MLS All-Star, 1998, 1999
- Trinidad and Tobago Football Federation Player of the Year: 2002

Medals

- Chaconia Medal Gold Class: 2006

== See also ==
- List of top international men's football goalscorers by country
- List of men's footballers with 100 or more international caps
- List of men's footballers with 50 or more international goals
