= Ricardo Iribarren =

Argentine footballer

Personal information
- Full name: Ricardo Jorge Iribarren
- Date of birth: November 2, 1967 (age 58)
- Place of birth: Berisso, Argentina
- Position: Defender

Senior career*
Years	Team	Apps	(Gls)
1985–1990, 1991–1994	Estudiantes	172	(0)
1991	LDU Quito	7	(0)
1994–1996	Belgrano de Córdoba	32	(0)
1996	Columbus Crew	19	(1)
1997	Almagro	12	(0)
1998	Columbus Crew	30	(1)
1999	Milwaukee Rampage	27	(0)
2000	FC Dallas	25	(0)
2001–2003	Pittsburgh Riverhounds	54	(3)

Managerial career
- 2003-2008: Pittsburgh Riverhounds (coach)
- 2009–2013: Columbus Crew (assistant)
- 2014: Argentina National Football Team (assistant)
- * Club domestic league appearances and goals as of November 2021

Ricardo Iribarren (born November 2, 1967, in Berisso, Argentina) is an Argentine footballer who played for a number of teams in Argentina, Ecuador, and the United States.

Iribarren played in the Argentine Primera for Estudiantes (1985–1990 / 1991–1994) and Belgrano de Córdoba (1994/1996). Iribarren played in Ecuador for LDU Quito in the first semester of 1991. In 1996, he played for the Columbus Crew in Major League Soccer. He returned to Argentina in 1997 where he played for Almagro. He then returned to the United States to MLS to play for Columbus, with FC Dallas, and in the United Soccer League with the Pittsburgh Riverhounds.

After retiring with the Pittsburgh Riverhounds in 2003, he coached the team until 2006.

In 2006, he coached high school soccer at the American School Foundation in Mexico City. Ricardo led the ASF soccer team to two undefeated varsity soccer finals in the local league, a first and third place in the ASOMEX tournament, and the junior varsity team to a first place in the local league. In 2008, he led the junior varsity in an almost perfect season with a score of 7–0 and lost the finals in penalties.

The Columbus Crew hired Ricardo Iribarren on January 22, 2009, as an assistant coach, reuniting him with former teammates Robert Warzycha and Brian Bliss.

Ricardo Iribarren was called as assistant coach to the Argentina National Team during the 2014 World Cup, helping lead them to second place.

Ricardo Iribarren is married to Evie and they have three children: Milena (32), Blas (30), and Jeremias (21). He also has three grandsons, Enzo, Kenzo, and Luca. Kenzo Iribarren is following in his grandfather's footsteps and currently playing soccer in Miami, Florida.
