= Jason Farrell =

American soccer player (born 1970)

Personal information
- Date of birth: December 31, 1970 (age 55)
- Place of birth: Seattle, Washington, United States
- Height: 5 ft 10 in (1.78 m)
- Position: Midfielder

College career
Years	Team	Apps	(Gls)
1989	Skagit Valley Cardinals		
1990	Washington Huskies		
1991–1992	Seattle Pacific Falcons		

Senior career*
Years	Team	Apps	(Gls)
1994–1996	Seattle Sounders	69	(9)
1995–1997	Kansas City Attack (indoor)	71	(47)
1997–2000	Columbus Crew	98	(11)
2000–2001	Wichita Wings (indoor)	19	(8)
2001–2004	Seattle Sounders	88	(9)
2001	→ LA Galaxy (loan)	0	(0)
Total		345	(84)

Managerial career
- 2005: Seattle Redhawks (assistant)
- 2006: Seattle Sounders (assistant)
- 2022–2023: Ballard FC
- 2023-: Seattle Redhawks (assistant)
- * Club domestic league appearances and goals

Jason Farrell (born December 31, 1970) is an American former soccer midfielder and current coach who spent four seasons in Major League Soccer, two in the American Professional Soccer League, one in the A-League, three in the National Professional Soccer League and four in the USL First Division. As a player he won two outdoor and one indoor championships.

As a manager he led Ballard FC to the USL League Two championship in 2023. He currently coaches collegiate soccer as an assistant with Seattle University.

== High school and college ==
Farrell was born and grew up in Seattle, Washington, attending Shorecrest High School and playing in the Seattle Youth Soccer Association. After graduating from Shorecrest in 1989, he attended Skagit Valley College for one year before transferring to the University of Washington for another year. While he played soccer at both Skagit and UW, he did not gain significant recognition until transferring to Seattle Pacific University. Farrell played two seasons with SPU, graduating in 1992.

== Professional ==
Following his graduation from SPU in 1992, there is a two-year gap in his career before Farrell signed with the expansion Seattle Sounders of the American Professional Soccer League in 1994. He played three seasons in Seattle, winning the 1995 and 1996 championships. Farrell scored the final goal of the 1995 A-League Championship, which would also prove to be the final goal scored in the first tier of American Soccer prior to Major League Soccer's formation and takeover of that slot the following year. In the 1996 championship, he assisted on Joey Leonetti’s first goal in a 2–0 victory over the Rochester Raging Rhinos. In 1995, Farrell signed with the indoor Kansas City Attack of the National Professional Soccer League (NPSL). He would play two seasons in Kansas City, alternating between them and the outdoor Sounders. In 1996, the Attack lost in the finals, but took the championship in 1997, giving Farrell his third title. While he Farrell is listed in some sources as playing the 1997–1998 season with the Attack, he is not listed in their end of year statistics. In March 1997, the Columbus Crew of Major League Soccer selected Farrell in the second round (13th overall) of the 1997 MLS Supplemental Draft. He played eighteen games, starting ten that season. Just more than three months after being the fourth player picked by the Chicago Fire in the 1997 MLS Expansion Draft on November 6, 1997, he was sent back to the Crew in exchange for Frank Klopas on February 19, 1998. Despite playing twenty-four games in the 2000 season, the Crew released Farrell after his relationship with head coach Tom Fitzgerald became acrimonious. In January 2001, Farrell was signed by the Wichita Wings of the NPSL after his good friend Jason Dunn was lost for the season due to a neck injury. Farrell helped solidify the midfield for the Wings, and he helped lead them to the playoffs. Unfortunately after the season, the Wings' franchise folded after 22 years, and Farrell moved back to the Pacific Northwest to rejoin the Sounders. On January 30, 2001, he signed with the sounders, playing the 2001 season with them. However, on August 31, 2001, he was loaned to the Los Angeles Galaxy of MLS when Brian Ching was injured. Farrell remained an unused substitute during his short stint in Los Angeles. On September 14, 2004, announced Farrell intention to retire at the end of the season.

== Coaching ==
On February 20, 2006, Farrell joined the Sounders as an assistant coach. He spent only one season in that position before leaving to become an assistant at Seattle Pacific University in April 2007, but was not on the coaching roster during the 1997 collegiate season. He has also served as an assistant coach with Seattle University and youth clubs in the Seattle area. In 2007 Farrell joined Pacific Premier FC in Northern Snohomish County as their Coaching Director. In January 2010, he was named Technical Director of the Seattle United youth soccer club, as part of a coaching leadership team that also includes ex-Seattle Sounder Jimmy McAlister.

Farrell was named first-ever head coach of USL League Two side Ballard FC on January 6, 2022. The next year, the team won the USL League Two national championship. On July 23, 2023, Farrell stepped down as Ballard FC head coach.
