= Billy Thompson (soccer, born 1968) =

American soccer player and coach

Personal information
- Full name: William Thompson
- Date of birth: May 5, 1968 (age 58)
- Place of birth: Cupertino, California, U.S.
- Height: 5 ft 6 in (1.68 m)
- Positions: Forward; midfielder

College career
Years	Team	Apps	(Gls)
1986–1990	UCLA Bruins		

Senior career*
Years	Team	Apps	(Gls)
1988–1989	Los Angeles Heat	?	(10)
1991–1995	Pau FC		
1995	Rajpracha		
1995	Hawaii Tsunami	14	(21)
1995–1996	Tampa Bay Terror (indoor)	40	(30)
1996–1999	Columbus Crew	82	(4)

International career
1988	United States	1	(0)

Managerial career
- 1999: Ohio Wesleyan women (assistant)
- 2000: Ohio Wesleyan men (assistant)
- 2000–2008: Worthington United (director of coaching)'
- 2000–2010: Wellington HS Dukes
- 2008–2015: Crew SC Academy
- 2017–2021: Capital Crusaders (assistant)
- 2022–: Los Gatos United (club director)
- * Club domestic league appearances and goals

William Thompson (born May 5, 1968) is a retired U.S. soccer player who is currently the club director for Los Gatos United. He earned one cap with the U.S. national team and played three seasons in Major League Soccer with the Columbus Crew.

== College ==
Thompson, born in Cupertino, California, attended UCLA where he played as a forward on the men's soccer team from 1986 to 1990. Thompson earned first team All American honors as a senior. That year he was the captain of the Bruins team which won the NCAA championship. Thompson was also the 1990 ISAA Player of the Year and finished his time at UCLA with 42 goals and 27 assists.

== Early career ==
While playing with UCLA, Thompson spent the 1988 and 1989 collegiate offseason with the Los Angeles Heat of the Western Soccer Alliance. In 1988, he was named to the WSA All Star team.

Following his last season at UCLA, Thompson was a member of the U.S. soccer team at the 1991 Summer World University Games. He then moved to France to play for FC Pau from 1991 to 1994. He was with the team from 1991 to 1994 before returning to the United States for a short spell with professional beach soccer which led him to compete in the Beach Soccer World Championship in Rio de Janeiro, Brazil a year later. In 1995, he spent a single season with the Hawaii Tsunami of the USISL. As a Member of the US Men's national team, Thompson played in the 1991 President's Cup in Seoul Korea where he was named the league's Offensive MVP. He also played in the World University Games in 1991 in Sheffield, England, the 1991 Gold Cup in Vancouver, Canada, the 1989 Tournoir Espoirs in Toulon, France, and the 1988 Marlboro Cup in Miami, Florida. He also competed in the President's Club, and was named the league's Offensive MVP. That same year he also guest played with Raj Pracha FC of Thailand.

== MLS ==
On February 6–7, 1996, Major League Soccer (MLS) held its first draft. The Columbus Crew selected Thompson in the third round (21st overall) ahead of fellow Bruins Eddie Lewis, Frankie Hejduk, and Ante Razov. At the time he was playing indoor soccer with the Tampa Bay Terror of the National Professional Soccer League. Thompson went on to play four seasons with the Crew. However, at the end of his second season, in which he saw time in only six games (four as a starter), the Crew did not protect Thompson during the expansion draft. The next season, he came back strong, appearing in twenty-nine games. However, he retired at the end of the 1999 season finishing with 4 goals and 18 assists for his MLS career.

== Coaching ==
After retiring from professional soccer, Thompson remained in Columbus to pursue a career youth soccer development. From 2000 to 2001, he served as the assistant coach to the Ohio Wesleyan men's and women's soccer teams. He also served as head coach for the Wellington High School girls' team from 2000 to 2011. In 2000, Thompson joined Worthington United, a local youth soccer club, growing the program from six teams to 60+, leading the 1990 boys team to the Ohio State Cup semifinals in 2006 and 2007, and to their first state title in 2008. In 2008 Worthington United partnered with the Columbus Crew where Thompson became the Director of Coaching and Player Development, and Academy Director for the Crew Soccer Academy of the newly formed Major League Soccer Youth Development Initiative. Thompson was the Director of Coaching for the Worthington Crew Juniors and Crew Juniors Soccer programs from 2008 to 2015. He was awarded Ohio South's coach of the year honors in 2005 and holds a USSF Youth Technical Director License and a USSF National "A" License. Since 2016, In 2016 Thompson transitioned to the Ohio Premier Soccer Club where he is presently the Ohio Premier Boys Director of Coaching and Player Development/Technical Director. In 2018, the Ohio Premier Boys ECNL U-19 team won the National Championship. In May 2022, he was named the Executive & Technical Director of Los Gatos United Soccer Club.

== National team ==
Thompson earned one cap with the U.S. national team. His one cap came in a 1–0 victory over Costa Rica on June 14, 1988. He played seventeen total games with the national team, but sixteen of those were not full internationals.

== Personal ==
Billy and his wife, Shawnda, reside in the Columbus area with their two children.
