= Musa Shannon =

Liberian footballer

Personal information
- Date of birth: 1 August 1975 (age 51)
- Place of birth: Syracuse, New York, United States
- Height: 1.82 m (6 ft 0 in)
- Position: Striker

Youth career
- 1993–1996: Robert Morris University

Senior career*
Years	Team	Apps	(Gls)
1997–1999	Tampa Bay Mutiny	50	(20)
1997	→ Carolina (loan)	1	(1)
1999–2001	Marítimo	18	(3)
2002	Colorado Rapids	2	(0)
2002	Vancouver Whitecaps	2	(0)
2003	Ningbo Yaoma	2	(0)
2004	Dongguan Dongcheng	14	(10)
Total		59	(21)

International career
2000–2001	Liberia	12	(1)
- * Club domestic league appearances and goals

Musa Shannon (born 1 August 1975) is a former professional footballer and administrator. He played professionally in the United States, Portugal, and China. Born in the United States, he represented the Liberia national team.

== Early and personal life ==
Shannon was born in the United States, where his Liberian parents were attending Syracuse University. Shannon was raised in the Liberian capital of Monrovia, before returning to the United States as a fifteen-year-old in 1990 following the escalation of the First Liberian Civil War.

== Playing career ==
On 2 February 1997, the Tampa Bay Mutiny selected Shannon in the third round (twenty-eighth overall) of the 1997 MLS College Draft. On 10 August 1997, Shannon went on loan to the Carolina Dynamo. He entered the game with five minutes remaining and scored the game-winning goal. In 2000, he moved to Marítimo in the Portuguese Primeira Liga. In 2002, he moved back to the United States where he signed with the Colorado Rapids. On 15 April 2003, Shannon signed with the Vancouver Whitecaps of the USL A-League. He played two games, then was released. He finished his professional career with Ningbo Yaoma in the Chinese third division.

After retiring as a professional, Shannon returned to the United States to play in the amateur Cosmopolitan Soccer League for Barnstonworth Rovers.

=== International career ===
Shannon also represented Liberia at international level, scoring one goal in 12 appearances between 2000 and 2001.

== Administration career ==
Shannon was named as President of FCAK-Liberia in 2008. In 2010, Shannon was elected to the position of Vice-President of the Liberia Football Association.

== Career statistics ==
=== International ===
Appearances and goals by national team and year
National team	Year	Apps	Goals
Liberia	2000	6	0
Liberia	2001	6	1
Total		12	1

Scores and results list Liberia's goal tally first, score column indicates score after each Shannon goal.

List of international goals scored by Musa Shannon
No.	Date	Venue	Opponent	Score	Result	Competition
1	28 October 2001	Accra Sports Stadium, Accra, Ghana	Ghana	3–1	3–1	2002 FIFA World Cup qualification
