= Rob Smith (soccer) =

American soccer player

Personal information
- Full name: Robert Christopher Smith
- Date of birth: August 20, 1973 (age 53)
- Place of birth: Wilmington, Delaware, U.S.
- Height: 5 ft 10 in (1.78 m)
- Position: Midfielder

Youth career
- 1991–1994: University of South Carolina

Senior career*
| Years | Team | Apps | (Gls) |
| 1996 | Delaware Wizards | 11 | (0) |
| 1996–2000 | Columbus Crew | 92 | (4) |
| 2000 | Indiana Blast | 1 | (0) |

Managerial career
- 2000–2001: University of South Carolina (assistant)
- * Club domestic league appearances and goals

Robert Christopher Smith (born August 20, 1973, in Wilmington, Delaware) is a former U.S. soccer player. He spent five seasons with the Columbus Crew of Major League Soccer as a midfielder. He was also a member of the U.S. soccer team at the 1996 Summer Olympics.

== Player ==
=== Youth ===
Rob Smith played for Kirkwood Soccer Club in New Castle Delaware for many of his youth years.

Rob Smith played for Thomas McKean High school in Wilmington, DE before attending the University of South Carolina where he played on the men's soccer team from 1991 to 1994. He holds the school's career assists record with 40.

=== Professional ===
In 1995, Smith played eleven games with the Delaware Wizards of USISL. The Columbus Crew selected Smith in the second round (20th overall) in the 1996 MLS Supplemental Draft. He spent five seasons with the Crew. Smith announced his retirement from playing on May 5, 2000. He played one game with the Indiana Blast. He then signed with the Charleston Battery on August 2, 2000, for the remainder of the 2000 USL season. He never played a game for the Battery.

=== National teams ===
In 1993, Smith was selected for the U.S. team which qualified for the 1993 U-20 World Cup to be held in Australia. At the World Cup, the U.S. went 1–1–1 in group play, qualifying for the second round where it fell to Brazil. Smith started all four games and assisted on two U.S. goals. In 1995, Smith was part of the U.S. soccer team at the Pan American games. The U.S. lost all three of its first-round games and did not qualify for the second round. That year, he also played on the U.S. World University Games soccer team. In 1996, U.S. coach Bruce Arena named Smith to the U.S. soccer team at the 1996 Summer Olympics. The team went 1–1–1, but failed to make the second round.

== Coaching ==
Since retiring from playing professionally, Smith has held several youth soccer positions beginning with Learning Through Sports, an organization he founded in 1996. In 2001, he joined the Worthington United Soccer Club and the Ohio South Olympic Development Program and continued with them both through 2003. In 2004, he joined WASA Eagles FC as the Director of Player Development. He also spent two seasons as an assistant coach with the University of South Carolina.

Besides coaching youth soccer, Smith is the Gym teacher at Worthington Hills Elementary School.

He taught badminton courses at Ohio State University in 2006–2007.

He also taught a gym class at Calumet Christian School in Columbus, Ohio, for elementary and middle school students from 2002 to 2006.

== Hall of Fame ==
In 2015 he was inducted into the Delaware Sports Hall of Fame.
