= Jason Boyce =

American soccer player

Personal information
- Date of birth: October 14, 1975 (age 51)
- Place of birth: Hollywood, California, U.S.
- Height: 5 ft 7 in (1.70 m)
- Position: Forward

Youth career
- 1994–1997: Washington Huskies

Senior career*
Years	Team	Apps	(Gls)
1998	Colorado Rapids	10	(0)
1998	→ MLS Pro 40 (loan)	4	(0)
1999	Miami Fusion	9	(0)
1999	→ MLS Pro 40 (loan)	2	(0)
1999–2000	Orange County Zodiac	27	(14)
2002	Seattle Sounders	13	(1)
2004	Utah Blitzz	5	(3)
2005	Los Angeles Galaxy	0	(0)
2006	Orange County Blue Star	3	(1)
2007–2008	Hollywood United		

International career
1994	United States U-20		
- * Club domestic league appearances and goals

Jason Boyce (born October 14, 1975) is an American former professional soccer player who played as a forward.

== Youth ==
While born in Hollywood, California, Boyce grew up in Newport Beach. He graduated from Corona del Mar High School where he was a 1993 Parade Magazine High School All American soccer player. He was also a California state finalist in the long jump his senior year. Boyce attended the University of Washington, playing on the men's soccer team from 1994 to 1997. He was a 1997 Second Team All American.

== Professional ==
On February 1, 1998, the Colorado Rapids selected Boyce in the second round (twenty-third overall) of the 1998 MLS College Draft. In July 1998, the Rapids sent Boyce on loan to MLS Pro 40. On August 14, 1998, the Rapids traded Boyce and Tyrone Marshall to the Miami Fusion in exchange for David Vaudreuil. He played five league games and one playoff game with the Fusion, then another four league games during the 1999 season before being waived in June 1999. He signed with the Orange County Zodiac of the USL A-League. He remained with the team, renamed the Orange County Wave in 2000. He broke his foot near the end of the 2000 season and sat out the 2001 season. He returned to the University of Washington to finish his degree. In June 2002, Boyce signed with the Seattle Sounders after the team was hit with several injuries. In 2004, he signed with the Utah Blitzz for that team's last season. In 2005, he played for the Los Angeles Galaxy reserve team. Boyce played for Hollywood United in 2007 and 2008. In 2010, he again played for the Galaxy reserve team.

== International ==
In 1994, Boyce played several games for the United States men's national under-20 soccer team.
