= 1996 Columbus Crew season =

Columbus Crew
1996 season
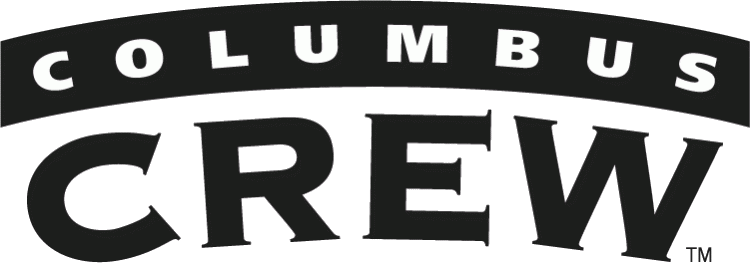
- Investor-operators: Lamar Hunt; Clark Hunt; Dan Hunt; Lamar Hunt Jr. Sharron Hunt Munson; Ron Pizzuti and a group of local investors
- Head Coach: Timo Liekoski (until August 2); Tom Fitzgerald (interim) (from August 2)
- Stadium: Ohio Stadium
- Major League Soccer: Conference: 4th Overall: 8th
- MLS Cup playoffs: Conference semifinals
- Top goalscorer: League: Brian McBride (17); All: Brian McBride (19)
- Highest home attendance: 31,550 (9/15 v. NY)
- Lowest home attendance: 12,832 (7/25 v. TB)
- Average home league attendance: 19,058 (75.8%)
- Biggest win: CLB 4–0 DC (4/13); KC 1–5 CLB (9/7)
- Biggest defeat: CLB 0–4 NY (6/30)
Home colors	Away colors

The 1996 Columbus Crew season was the club's first season of existence and their first season in Major League Soccer, the top flight of soccer in the United States. The first match of the season was on April 13 against D.C. United. It was the first season under head coach Timo Liekoski who resigned on August 2. Tom Fitzgerald took over as interim head coach through the rest of the season.

== Roster ==
As of August 10, 1996

Note: Flags indicate national team as defined under FIFA eligibility rules; some limited exceptions apply. Players may hold more than one non-FIFA nationality.

No.	Pos.	Nation	Player
1	GK	USA	Bo Oshoniyi
1	GK	USA	Brad Friedel
2	FW	USA	Mac Cozier
3	DF	USA	Mike Clark
4	DF	USA	Janusz Michallik
5	DF	USA	Paul Caligiuri
6	MF	USA	Todd Yeagley
7	DF	USA	Shane Battelle
8	DF	USA	Brian Bliss
9	FW	USA	Billy Thompson
10	MF	USA	Brian Maisonneuve

No.	Pos.	Nation	Player
11	FW	URU	Adrián Paz
12	FW	USA	Pete Marino
15	MF	RSA	Doctor Khumalo (captain)
16	MF	USA	Rob Smith
18	GK	USA	David Winner
19	MF	POL	Robert Warzycha
20	FW	USA	Brian McBride
21	DF	ARG	Ricardo Iribarren
22	FW	ARG	Marcelo Carrera
29	GK	CAN	Pat Harrington

=== Out on loan ===
Note: Flags indicate national team as defined under FIFA eligibility rules; some limited exceptions apply. Players may hold more than one non-FIFA nationality.

No.	Pos.	Nation	Player
17	FW	USA	Ricci Greenwood (on loan to Ohio Xoggz)
17	DF	USA	Todd Miller (on loan to Milwaukee Rampage)

== Technical Staff ==
Position	Staff
General Manager	(United States) Jamey Rootes
Head Coach	(Finland) Timo Liekoski until August 2 (United States) Tom Fitzgerald after August 2
Assistant Coach	(United States) Tom Fitzgerald until August 2 (United States) John Ellinger after August 11
Assistant Coach	(Argentina) Oscar Pisano
Goalkeeper Coach	(United States) Greg Andrulis
Head Trainer	(United States) Amy Baer

== Non-competitive ==
=== Preseason ===
March 16 Friendly	Columbus Crew	1-1	Kansas City Wiz	Boca Raton, FL
	Goal		Goal	Stadium: Florida Atlantic University

March 17 Friendly	Columbus Crew	2-2	Tampa Bay Mutiny	Boca Raton, FL
	Young 5'; Marino pen.'	Report	Lassiter; Viera 81'	Stadium: Florida Atlantic University; Attendance: 2,000

March 18 Friendly	Columbus Crew	6-0	Lynn Fighting Knights	Boca Raton, FL

March 19 Friendly	Columbus Crew	3-2	Kansas City Wiz	Boca Raton, FL
7:00 PM EST	Clark 21', 61'; Marino 80'	Report	Ekemé 37'; Snow 51'	Stadium: Florida Atlantic University

March 20 Friendly	Columbus Crew	2-1	NY/NJ Metrostars	Boca Raton, FL
	Miller 15'; Paz 67'	Report	Savarese 73'; Caricola (red card) 81'	Stadium: Florida Atlantic University

March 21 Friendly	Columbus Crew	v	Florida Atlantic Owls	Boca Raton, FL
6:30 PM EST				Stadium: Florida Atlantic University

March 22 Friendly	Columbus Crew	2-2	New England Revolution	Boca Raton, FL
	Young 45'; Marino 72'	Report	Galderisi 3', 57' (pen.)	Stadium: Florida Atlantic University

March 23 Friendly	Columbus Crew	1-1	Kansas City Wiz	Boca Raton, FL
	Marino 53'	Report	Takawira 67'	Stadium: Saint Andrew's School

=== Midseason ===
June 14 Friendly	Columbus Crew	2-3	U.S. U-23 National Team	Columbus, OH
7:30 PM EDT	Cozier (yellow card) 33', (goal) 63'; Warzycha 39'	Report	Peay (yellow card) 2'; Amani-Dove 36'; Baba 44'; Maisonneuve 56'	Stadium: Ohio Stadium; Attendance: 13,630; Referee: Ali Saheli

== Competitive ==
=== Overview ===
Competition	First match	Last match	Starting round	Final position	Record							
Competition	First match	Last match	Starting round	Final position	Pld	W	D	L	GF	GA	GD	Win %
Major League Soccer	April 13, 1996	September 21, 1996	Matchday 1	4th	32	11	17	4	59	60	−1	34.38
MLS Cup Playoffs	September 25, 1996	October 2, 1996	Conference Semifinals	Conference Semifinals	3	1	0	2	2	7	−5	33.33
Total					35	12	17	6	61	67	−6	34.29

Source: Competitions

=== MLS ===
==== Standings ====
===== Eastern Conference =====
Pos	Team	Pld	W	SOW	L	GF	GA	GD	Pts	Qualification
1	Tampa Bay Mutiny	32	19	1	12	66	51	+15	58	MLS Cup Playoffs
2	D.C. United	32	15	1	16	62	56	+6	46	MLS Cup Playoffs
3	NY/NJ MetroStars	32	12	3	17	45	47	−2	39	MLS Cup Playoffs
4	Columbus Crew	32	11	4	17	59	60	−1	37	MLS Cup Playoffs
5	New England Revolution	32	9	6	17	43	56	−13	33	

Source: MLS

===== Overall table =====
Pos	Team	Pld	W	SOW	L	GF	GA	GD	Pts
6	NY/NJ MetroStars	32	12	3	17	45	47	−2	39
7	San Jose Clash	32	12	3	17	50	50	0	39
8	Columbus Crew	32	11	4	17	59	60	−1	37
9	New England Revolution	32	9	6	17	43	56	−13	33
10	Colorado Rapids	32	9	2	21	44	59	−15	29

Source: MLS
Rules for classification: 1) points; 2) head-to-head record; 3) goal difference; 4) number of goals scored

==== Results summary ====
Overall								Home						Away					
Pld	Pts	W	L	T	GF	GA	GD	W	L	T	GF	GA	GD	W	L	T	GF	GA	GD
32	37	11	17	4	59	60	−1	8	8	0	32	27	+5	3	9	4	27	33	−6

Source: MLS standings
Pld = Matches played; Pts = Points; W = Matches won; T = Matches tied; L = Matches lost; GF = Goals for; GA = Goals against; GD = Goal difference

==== Results by round ====
Round	1	2	3	4	5	6	7	8	9	10	11	12	13	14	15	16	17	18	19	20	21	22	23	24	25	26	27	28	29	30	31	32
Stadium	H	H	A	A	A	H	A	H	A	A	H	H	A	A	H	A	A	H	H	H	A	H	A	H	A	H	H	H	A	H	A	A
Result	W	L	W	L	L	W	L	L	L	L	L	L	SW	SW	L	L	L	L	L	W	L	L	SW	W	SW	W	W	W	W	W	L	W

Source: schedule
A = Away; H = Home; W = Win; L = Loss; SW = Shootout Win

==== Match results ====
April 13 1	Columbus Crew	4-0	D.C. United	Columbus, OH
7:30 PM EDT	Lee 18' (o.g.); McBride 29', 86'; Clark (yellow card) 39'; Marino 48'; Oshoniyi (yellow card) 79'	Report	Williams (yellow card) 19'; Lee (yellow card) 33'; Etcheverry (yellow card) 66'	Stadium: Ohio Stadium; Attendance: 25,266; Referee: Raul Dominguez; Assistant referees: Walter Jones; Kim Vieira; Fourth official: Kelly Ross

April 20 2	Columbus Crew	1-2	Tampa Bay Mutiny	Columbus, OH
7:30 PM EDT	Battelle (yellow card) 19'; Watson (yellow card) 54'; Khumalo 60'; Maisonneuve (yellow card) 62'	Report	Vásquez 12', (yellow card) 10'; Marino 28' (o.g.); Kooiman (yellow card) 59'; Viera (yellow card) 77'; Dougherty (yellow card) 86'	Stadium: Ohio Stadium; Attendance: 24,434; Referee: Rich Grady; Assistant referees: Michael Kennedy; Ted Covaciu; Fourth official: Giovanni Piazza

April 27 3	NY/NJ MetroStars	0-2	Columbus Crew	East Rutherford, NJ
7:30 PM EDT	Knowles (yellow card) 33'; Zaun (yellow card) 44'; Vermes (yellow card) 58'	Report	Bliss 13', (yellow card) 15'; Thompson 87'	Stadium: Giants Stadium; Attendance: 26,416; Referee: Zimmerman Boulos; Assistant referees: Ricardo Renderos; Charles Ponti; Fourth official: Matt Lawlor

May 2 4	Kansas City Wiz	6-4	Columbus Crew	Kansas City, MO
8:30 PM EDT	Chung 5'; Johnston 47', 70'; Preki 67' (pen.), 88'; Sorber 77'	Report	McBride 20'; Bliss (yellow card) 41'; Yeagley 48'; Clark 64'; Bowers 65' (o.g.); Thompson (yellow card) 79'	Stadium: Arrowhead Stadium; Referee: Esse Baharmast; Assistant referees: Ali Mohebbi; Alan Shepherd; Fourth official: Michael Pfeiffer

May 5 5	Dallas Burn	0-0 (3–1 SO)	Columbus Crew	Dallas, TX
4:00 PM EDT	Álvarez (yellow card) 41' (yellow-red card) 87'	Report	Michallik (yellow card) 10'	Stadium: Cotton Bowl; Attendance: 35,250; Referee: Brian Hall; Assistant referees: Michael Williams; Andrew Barnes; Fourth official: Glenn Prechac
	Shootout
	Haynes (penalty scored); Rodríguez (penalty missed); Lozzano (penalty scored); Ashton (penalty scored)		(penalty missed) McBride; (penalty missed) Thompson; (penalty missed) Ward; (penalty scored) Carrera

May 11 6	Columbus Crew	3-2	New England Revolution	Columbus, OH
7:30 PM EDT	McBride 48' (pen.), 89'; Marino 87'	Report	Wélton 18'; Naveda 34', (yellow card) 78'; Burns (yellow card) 48'; Aunger (yellow card) 68'; DeBrito (yellow card) 71'; Chronopoulos (yellow card) 87'	Stadium: Ohio Stadium; Attendance: 24,750; Referee: Roberto Van de Wyngard; Assistant referees: Vito Testa; Frank Fiehn; Fourth official: Michael Porpora

May 15 7	D.C. United	5-2	Columbus Crew	Washington, D.C.
7:30 PM EDT	Rammel 28', 48', 53'; Arce 67', 70', (yellow card) 88'		Khumalo (yellow card) 51'; McBride 76'; Paz 85' (pen.)	Stadium: Robert F. Kennedy Memorial Stadium; Attendance: 7,422; Referee: Esse Baharmast; Assistant referees: Robert Kuhnle; Steve Taylor (AR2); Fourth official: Rob Fereday

May 19 8	Columbus Crew	2-4	Colorado Rapids	Columbus, OH
4:00 PM EDT	Khumalo (yellow card) 22', (goal) 42' (pen.); McBride 27'	Report	Kinnear (yellow card) 19': Bartlett 49', 73'; Balboa 80'; Sharpe 88'	Stadium: Ohio Stadium; Attendance: 20,184; Referee: Zekay Akbay; Assistant referees: Jamil Hamdan; Carlos Folino; Fourth official: Mark Carpenter

May 26 9	LA Galaxy	3-2	Columbus Crew	Pasadena, CA
4:00 PM EDT	Karapetyan 29', 50'; Hurtado (yellow card) 44', (goal) 68'	Report	Yeagley (yellow card) 17' (yellow-red card) 23'; Marino 24', 51'	Stadium: Rose Bowl; Attendance: 15,231; Referee: Tim Weyland; Assistant referees: Rene Flores; Bryan Elliott; Fourth official: Juan Hernandez

June 1 10	San Jose Clash	2-2 (2–1 SO)	Columbus Crew	San Jose, CA
10:30 PM EDT	Iroha (yellow card) 21'; Gutierrez 29'; Doyle (yellow card) 36'; Baicher (yellow card) 46'; Wynalda (yellow card) 63'; Butler 84'; Dayak (yellow card) 90'	Report	Watson (yellow card) 2'; Paz (yellow card) 11'; Marino 31'; McBride 68' (pen.); Oshoniyi (yellow card) 90'	Stadium: Spartan Stadium; Attendance: 16,077; Referee: Arturo Angeles; Assistant referees: David Bragg; Miguel Moreno; Fourth official: Fidel Gutierrez
	Shootout
	Iroha (penalty missed); Wynalda (penalty missed); Butler (penalty scored); Rodas (penalty missed); Espinoza (penalty scored)		(penalty scored) Marino; (penalty missed) McBride; (penalty missed) Paz; (penalty missed) Ward; (penalty missed) Bliss

June 8 11	Columbus Crew	3-3 (1–4 SO)	Kansas City Wiz	Columbus, OH
1:30 PM EDT	Paz 38', 43'; Marino 41'; Caligiuri (red card) 59'; Oshoniyi (yellow card) 85'	Report	Takawira 1'; Johnston (yellow card) 21'; Uderitz (yellow card) 48', (goal) 50'; Preki 60' (pen.)	Stadium: Ohio Stadium; Attendance: 16,526; Referee: Raul Dominguez; Assistant referees: Brian Darling; Kermit Quisenberry; Fourth official: Douglas Palomaki
	Shootout
	Thompson (penalty scored); Paz (penalty missed); Michallik (penalty missed)		(penalty scored) Chung; (penalty scored) Eichmann; (penalty scored) Preki; (penalty scored) Koetters

June 19 12	Columbus Crew	2-2 (1–4 SO)	Colorado Rapids	Columbus, OH
7:30 PM EDT	Thompson 31'; Carrera 58'	Report	Trittschuh 44'; Balboa 48', (yellow card) 83'	Stadium: Ohio Stadium; Attendance: 13,093; Referee: Marcel Yonan; Assistant referees: Kim Vieira; Clement Adduchio; Fourth official: Patrick Ruetschle
	Shootout
	Thompson (penalty missed); Warzycha (penalty missed); Marino (penalty scored)		(penalty scored) Henderson; (penalty scored) Benedetti; (penalty scored) Bartlett; (penalty scored) Sharpe

June 22 13	Tampa Bay Mutiny	3-3 (2–3 SO)	Columbus Crew	Tampa, FL
7:30 PM EDT	Ralston 28'; Wise (yellow card) 39'; Pittman (yellow card) 39'; Lassiter 64' (pen.); Vásquez 71'	Report	Caligiuri 7'; Khumalo 21' (pen.); Winner (yellow card) 40'; Bliss (yellow card) 50'; Marino 50'; Warzycha (yellow card) 60'	Stadium: Houlihan's Stadium; Attendance: 8,767; Referee: Joshua Patlak; Assistant referees: Shane Moody; Jack Holland; Fourth official: Jaime Guerra
	Shootout
	Pittman (penalty missed); Kooiman (penalty missed); Lassiter (penalty scored); Vásquez (penalty scored); Ralston (penalty missed)		(penalty scored) Thompson; (penalty scored) Marino; (penalty scored) Carrera; (penalty missed) Warzycha

June 27 14	New England Revolution	1-1 (1–2 SO)	Columbus Crew	Foxborough, MA
7:00 PM EDT	Aunger (yellow card) 50'; Burns (yellow card) 70'; Kerr (yellow card) 72'; Wélton 77'	Report	Marino 20'; Winner (yellow card) 90'	Stadium: Foxboro Stadium; Attendance: 15,209; Referee: Zimmerman Boulos; Assistant referees: Delfrim Rainho; John Motta; Fourth official: Thomas Supple
	Shootout
	Wélton (penalty missed); Keegan (penalty missed); Aunger (penalty scored); Kerr (penalty missed); Burns (penalty missed); Sawatzky (penalty missed); Fraser (penalty missed); Okaroh (penalty missed); Wylie (penalty missed)		(penalty missed) Thompson; (penalty missed) Marino; (penalty scored) Carrera; (penalty missed) Cozier; (penalty missed) Caligiuri; (penalty missed) Clark; (penalty missed) Warzycha; (penalty missed) Michallik; (penalty scored) Battelle

June 30 15	Columbus Crew	0-4	NY/NJ MetroStars	Columbus, OH
2:00 PM EDT	Cozier (yellow card) 70'	Report	Caricola 23'; Ramos (yellow card) 27', (goal) 79'; Vermes (yellow card) 29'; Harty (yellow card) 41'; Savarese 76'; Unger 90'	Stadium: Ohio Stadium; Attendance: 17,261; Referee: Rich Grady; Assistant referees: Michael Kennedy; Giovanni Piazza; Fourth official: Mikael Lundqvist

July 4 16	Tampa Bay Mutiny	4-1	Columbus Crew	Tampa, FL
7:30 PM EDT	Galderisi 15'; Ralston 56'; Lassiter 73', 78'	Report	Marino 18'; Battelle (yellow card) 32'	Stadium: Houlihan's Stadium; Attendance: 18,761; Referee: Joshua Patlak; Assistant referees: Shane Moody; Jack Holland; Fourth official: Jaime Guerra

July 7 17	Colorado Rapids	2-1	Columbus Crew	Denver,CO
4:00 PM EDT	Trittschuh 41'; Harbor (yellow card) 62'; Hamlett (yellow card) 67'; Benedetti 83'	Report	Caligiuri (yellow card) 29'; Iribarren (yellow card) 40'; Warzycha 77'	Stadium: Mile High Stadium; Attendance: 7,911; Referee: Kevin Terry; Assistant referees: Kevin Yant; Val Leibold; Fourth official: Justin De Grado

July 11 18	Columbus Crew	1-1 (0–3 SO)	New England Revolution	Columbus, OH
7:30 PM EST	Caligiuri 25'	Report	Chronopoulos 78'	Stadium: Ohio Stadium; Attendance: 13,751; Referee: Arturo Angeles; Assistant referees: Jamil Hamdan; Carlos Folino; Fourth official: Kelly Ross
	Shootout
	Thompson (penalty missed); Marino (penalty missed); Carrera (penalty missed)		(penalty scored) Naveda; (penalty scored) Chronopoulos; (penalty scored) Keegan

July 20 19	Columbus Crew	3-4	San Jose Clash	Columbus, OH
7:30 PM EDT	Warzycha 22'; McBride 37', 58'	Report	Wynalda 7'; Bravo 17', 60'; Baicher (yellow card) 42'; Doyle 50'; Draguicevich (yellow card) 56'; Espinoza (yellow card) 67' (yellow-red card) 73'	Stadium: Ohio Stadium; Attendance: 18,156; Referee: Ali Saheli; Assistant referees: Frank Fiehn; Michael Porpora; Fourth official: Vito Testa

July 25 20	Columbus Crew	1-0	Tampa Bay Mutiny	Columbus, OH
7:30 PM EDT	Marino 16'; Mike Clark (yellow card) 21'	Report	McKinley (yellow card) 7'; Frye (yellow card) 25' (yellow-red card) 60'; Dougherty (yellow card) 67'; Kooiman (yellow card) 70'	Stadium: Ohio Stadium; Attendance: 12,832; Referee: Roberto Van de Wyngard; Assistant referees: Walter Jones; Clement Adduchio; Fourth official: Hugh Cullin

July 28 21	D.C. United	2-0	Columbus Crew	Washington, D.C.
4:00 PM EDT	Rammel 1'; Marsch 83'	Report	Warzycha (yellow card) 61'	Stadium: Robert F. Kennedy Memorial Stadium; Attendance: 11,173; Referee: Ruben Rodhas; Assistant referees: Nate Clement; Bruce Kamerer; Fourth official: Mike Clair

July 31 22	Columbus Crew	1-2	Dallas Burn	Columbus, OH
7:30 PM EDT	Iribarren (yellow card) 10'; Caligiuri (yellow card) 30'; Warzycha (yellow card) 53'; McBride 83'	Report	Kreis 27'; Sánchez (yellow card) 29'; Lozzano 47'	Stadium: Ohio Stadium; Attendance: 13,190; Referee: Tim Weyland; Assistant referees: Brian Darling; Kermit Quisenberry; Fourth official: Brian Apswich

August 4 23	LA Galaxy	1-1 (2–3 SO)	Columbus Crew	Pasadena, CA
7:30 PM EDT	Jones (yellow card) 33'; Calichman (yellow card) 36'; Cienfuegos (yellow card) 52', (goal) 70'; Vanney (yellow card) 56'; Armas (yellow card) 84'	Report	Clark (red card) 33'; Iribarren (yellow card) 36'; Paz 87'	Stadium: Rose Bowl; Attendance: 15,089; Referee: Frank Gorog; Assistant referees: Jorge Reyes; Roger Itaya; Fourth official: Rene Flores
	Shootout
	Salcedo (penalty scored); Fraser (penalty scored); Jones (penalty missed); Cienfuegos (penalty missed); Vanney (penalty missed)		(penalty missed) Thompson; (penalty missed) Marino; (penalty scored) Carrera; (penalty scored) Yeagley; (penalty scored) Maisonneuve

August 10 24	Columbus Crew	3-2	D.C. United	Columbus, OH
7:30 PM EDT	Smith (yellow card) 18'; Iribarren 55'; McBride 57'; Paz 60'	Report	Moreno 27'; Arce 31'; Pope (yellow card) 75'	Stadium: Ohio Stadium; Attendance: 18,587; Referee: Steve Olson; Assistant referees: Frank Fiehn; Jeffrey Mellen; Fourth official: Douglas Palomaki

August 14 25	Dallas Burn	2-2 (2–3 SO)	Columbus Crew	Dallas, TX
8:30 PM EDT	Elliott · 73', 76'	Report	Carrera 62'; Iribarren (yellow card) 76' (yellow-red card) 79'; McBride 83'	Stadium: Cotton Bowl; Attendance: 7,338; Referee: Zimmerman Boulos; Assistant referees: Paul Scott; Bill Briseno; Fourth official: Ralph Boggs
	Shootout
	Haynes (penalty missed); Lozzano (penalty scored); Sánchez (penalty scored); Farrer (penalty missed); Elliot (penalty missed); Kreis (penalty missed); Puskarich (penalty missed); Soñora (penalty missed); Flores (penalty missed)		(penalty scored) Carrera; (penalty missed) Marino; (penalty missed) Maisonneuve; (penalty missed) Yeagley; (penalty scored) Paz; (penalty missed) Caligiuri; (penalty missed) McBride; (penalty missed) Smith; (penalty scored) Clark

August 18 26	Columbus Crew	2-0	San Jose Clash	Columbus, OH
2:00 PM EDT	Maisonneuve 77'; Paz 82'	Report	Emenalo (yellow card) 23'; Espinoza (yellow card) 45'	Stadium: Ohio Stadium; Attendance: 16,629; Referee: Paul Tamberino; Assistant referees: Patrick Ruetschle; Giovanni Piazza; Fourth official: Hugh Cullin

August 24 27	Columbus Crew	2-1	Kansas City Wiz	Columbus, OH
7:30 PM EDT	McBride 5'; Maisonneuve 10'; Clark (yellow card) 56' (yellow-red card) 81'	Report	Johnston 41'	Stadium: Ohio Stadium; Attendance: 20,246; Referee: Joshua Patlak; Assistant referees: Walter Jones; Kim Vieira; Fourth official: Hugh Cullin

August 28 28	Columbus Crew	2-0	LA Galaxy	Columbus, OH
7:30 PM EDT	Caligiuri 9'; Michallik (yellow card) 59'; Warzycha (yellow card) 63'; McBride 72'; Smith (yellow card) 77'	Report	Vasquez (yellow card) 53'; Campos (yellow card) 80'	Stadium: Ohio Stadium; Attendance: 16,747; Referee: Ruben Rodhas; Assistant referees: Tarek Khan; Clement Adduchio; Fourth official: Mikael Lundqvist

September 7 29	Kansas City Wiz	1-5	Columbus Crew	Kansas City, MO
8:30 PM EDT	Okafor (yellow card) 20'; Klopas (yellow card) 30'; Preki 54'; Takawira (red card) 72'	Report	Carrera 8'; Maisonneuve 9', 50', 82'; Warzycha (yellow card) 17'; Friedel (yellow card) 61'; Marino 80'	Stadium: Arrowhead Stadium; Attendance: 12,141; Referee: Arturo Angeles; Assistant referees: Thomas Smith; Richard Huber; Fourth official: Rob Chaplin

September 15 30	Columbus Crew	2-0	NY/NJ MetroStars	Columbus, OH
4:00 PM EDT	McBride 3'; Carrera 14'; Yeagley (yellow card) 34'	Report	Caricola (yellow card) 6'; Vermes (yellow card) 21'	Stadium: Ohio Stadium; Attendance: 31,550; Referee: Robert Sheker; Assistant referees: Frank Fiehn; Michael Porpora; Fourth official: Vito Testa

September 18 31	NY/NJ MetroStars	1-0	Columbus Crew	East Rutherford, NJ
7:30 PM EDT	de Ávila 9'; Ramos (yellow card) 82'; Silvera (yellow card) 84'	Report	Iribarren (yellow card) 44'; Warzycha (yellow card) 63'	Stadium: Giants Stadium; Attendance: 14,007; Referee: Kevin Terry; Assistant referees: Noel Kenny; Alberto Giordano; Fourth official: George Vargas

September 21 32	New England Revolution	0-1	Columbus Crew	Foxborough, MA
7:30 PM EDT	Lalas (yellow card) 30'; Watson (red card) 33'	Report	McBride 37'; Mike Clark (yellow card) 69'	Stadium: Foxboro Stadium; Attendance: 38,633; Referee: Esse Baharmast; Assistant referees: Edwin Resendes; Mark Oliver; Fourth official: Thomas Supple

=== MLS Cup Playoffs ===
==== Conference Semifinals ====
September 25 Game 1	Columbus Crew	0-2	Tampa Bay Mutiny	Columbus, OH
	Yeagley (yellow card) 11'	Report	Lassiter (yellow card) 34', (goal) 82', 87'	Stadium: Ohio Stadium; Attendance: 20,807; Referee: Brian Hall; Assistant referees: Roberto Van de Wyngard; Kelly Ross; Fourth official: Hugh Cullin

September 28 Game 2	Tampa Bay Mutiny	1-2	Columbus Crew	Tampa, FL
	Lassiter 26', (yellow card) 59'	Report	Paz 1'; Caliguri (yellow card) 44'; McBride 58'; Iribarren (yellow card) 62'; Warzycha (yellow card) 67'; Friedel (yellow card) 85'	Stadium: Houlihan's Stadium; Attendance: 13,009; Referee: Rich Grady; Assistant referees: Roger O'Brien; Roger Sill; Fourth official: George Banica

October 2 Game 3	Tampa Bay Mutiny	4-1	Columbus Crew	Tampa, FL
	Vásquez 3', (yellow card) 27'; Lassiter 41', 58'; Kooiman (yellow card) 53'; Pittman 55'	Report	McBride 35'; Iribarren (yellow card) 36'; Caliguri (yellow card) 45'; Warzycha (yellow card) 60'	Stadium: Houlihan's Stadium; Attendance: 6,871; Referee: Tim Weyland; Assistant referees: Mario Martinez; Shane Moody; Fourth official: Jaime Guerra
Note: Tampa Bay Mutiny wins series 2–1, advances to Conference finals.

== Statistics ==
=== Appearances and goals ===
Under "Apps" for each section, the first number represents the number of starts, and the second number represents appearances as a substitute.

No.	Pos	Nat	Player	Total		MLS		MLS Cup Playoffs	
No.	Pos	Nat	Player	Apps	Goals	Apps	Goals	Apps	Goals
1	GK	(United States) USA	Bo Oshoniyi	13	0	13+0	0	0+0	0
1	GK	(United States) USA	Brad Friedel	12	0	9+0	0	3+0	0
2	FW	(United States) USA	Mac Cozier	13	0	0+13	0	0+0	0
3	DF	(United States) USA	Mike Clark	30	1	27+0	1	3+0	0
4	DF	(United States) USA	Janusz Michallik	32	0	28+3	0	1+0	0
5	DF	(United States) USA	Paul Caligiuri	25	3	21+1	3	3+0	0
6	MF	(United States) USA	Todd Yeagley	25	1	14+8	1	3+0	0
7	DF	(United States) USA	Shane Battelle	16	0	10+5	0	1+0	0
8	DF	(United States) USA	Brian Bliss	19	1	19+0	1	0+0	0
9	FW	(United States) USA	Billy Thompson	24	2	24+0	2	0+0	0
10	MF	(United States) USA	Brian Maisonneuve	18	5	13+2	5	3+0	0
11	FW	(Uruguay) URU	Adrián Paz	30	7	19+8	6	3+0	1
12	FW	(United States) USA	Pete Marino	32	11	18+11	11	3+0	0
15	MF	(South Africa) RSA	Doctor Khumalo	26	3	23+2	3	1+0	0
16	MF	(United States) USA	Rob Smith	12	0	9+0	0	3+0	0
17	FW	(United States) USA	Ricci Greenwood	1	0	0+1	0	0+0	0
17	DF	(United States) USA	Todd Miller	4	0	2+1	0	1+0	0
18	GK	(United States) USA	David Winner	7	0	6+1	0	0+0	0
19	MF	(Poland) POL	Robert Warzycha	23	2	20+0	2	3+0	0
20	FW	(United States) USA	Brian McBride	31	19	28+0	17	3+0	2
21	DF	(Argentina) ARG	Ricardo Iribarren	19	1	15+1	1	3+0	0
22	FW	(Argentina) ARG	Marcelo Carrera	33	4	12+18	4	2+1	0
29	GK	(Canada) CAN	Pat Harrington	4	0	4+0	0	0+0	0
			Own goal	0	2	-	2	-	0
Players who left Columbus during the season:
13	DF	(Canada) CAN	Mark Watson	14	0	14+0	0	0+0	0
14	FW	(Nigeria) NGA	Obi Monome	1	0	0+1	0	0+0	0
17	FW	(Jamaica) JAM	Paul Young	4	0	1+3	0	0+0	0
17	FW	(United States) USA	Dante Washington	3	0	3+0	0	0+0	0
21	MF	(United States) USA	Brandon Ward	6	0	3+3	0	0+0	0
-	GK	(England) ENG	Ron Fearon	0	0	0+0	0	0+0	0

Source: Columbus stats

=== Disciplinary record ===
No.	Pos.	Name	MLS		MLS Cup Playoffs		Total	
No.	Pos.	Name	Booked	Sent off (straight red)	Booked	Sent off (straight red)	Booked	Sent off (straight red)
1	GK	(United States) Bo Oshoniyi	3	0	0	0	3	0
1	GK	(United States) Brad Friedel	1	0	1	0	2	0
2	FW	(United States) Mac Cozier	1	0	0	0	1	0
3	DF	(United States) Mike Clark	4	2	0	0	4	2
4	DF	(United States) Janusz Michallik	2	0	0	0	2	0
5	MF	(United States) Paul Caligiuri	2	1	2	0	4	1
6	MF	(United States) Todd Yeagley	2	1	1	0	3	1
7	DF	(United States) Shane Battelle	2	0	0	0	2	0
8	DF	(United States) Brian Bliss	3	0	0	0	3	0
9	FW	(United States) Billy Thompson	1	0	0	0	1	0
10	MF	(United States) Brian Maisonneuve	1	0	0	0	1	0
11	FW	(Uruguay) Adrián Paz	1	0	0	0	1	0
12	FW	(United States) Pete Marino	0	0	0	0	0	0
15	MF	(South Africa) Doctor Khumalo	2	0	0	0	2	0
16	MF	(United States) Rob Smith	2	0	0	0	2	0
17	FW	(United States) Ricci Greenwood	0	0	0	0	0	0
17	DF	(United States) Todd Miller	0	0	0	0	0	0
17	FW	(Jamaica) Paul Young	0	0	0	0	0	0
18	GK	(United States) David Winner	2	0	0	0	2	0
19	MF	(Poland) Robert Warzycha	6	0	2	0	8	0
20	FW	(United States) Brian McBride	0	0	0	0	0	0
21	DF	(Argentina) Ricardo Iribarren	5	1	2	0	7	1
22	FW	(Argentina) Marcelo Carrera	0	0	0	0	0	0
29	GK	(Canada) Pat Harrington	0	0	0	0	0	0
Players who left Columbus during the season:
13	DF	(United States) Mark Watson	2	0	0	0	2	0
14	FW	(Nigeria) Obi Monome	0	0	0	0	0	0
17	FW	(Jamaica) Paul Young	0	0	0	0	0	0
17	FW	(United States) Dante Washington	0	0	0	0	0	0
21	MF	(United States) Brandon Ward	0	0	0	0	0	0
-	GK	(England) Ron Fearon	0	0	0	0	0	0

=== Clean sheets ===
No.	Name	MLS	MLS Cup Playoffs	Total	Games Played
1	(United States) Bo Oshoniyi	2	0	2	13
1	(United States) Brad Friedel	4	0	4	12
18	(United States) David Winner	0	0	0	7
29	(Canada) Pat Harrington	1	0	1	4
Players who left Columbus during the season:
-	(England) Ron Fearon	0	0	0	0

== Transfers ==
=== In ===
Pos.	Player	Transferred from	Fee/notes	Date	Source
MF	(South Africa) Doctor Khumalo	(South Africa) Kaizer Chiefs	Allocated by the league.	December 21, 1995	
MF	(United States) Brian Maisonneuve	(United States) Indiana Hoosiers	Allocated by the league.	February 1, 1996	
FW	(Uruguay) Adrián Paz	(China) Shanghai Pudong	Allocated by the league.	February 4, 1996	
DF	(United States) Brian Bliss	(Germany) FC Carl Zeiss Jena	Allocated by the league.	February 4, 1996	
FW	(United States) Brian McBride	(Germany) VfL Wolfsburg	Drafted in round 1 of the 1996 MLS Inaugural Player Draft.	February 6, 1996	
DF	(Canada) Mark Watson	(Canada) Vancouver 86ers	Drafted in round 2 of the 1996 MLS Inaugural Player Draft.	February 6, 1996	
FW	(United States) Billy Thompson	(United States) Tampa Bay Terror	Drafted in round 3 of the 1996 MLS Inaugural Player Draft.	February 6, 1996	
DF	(United States) Mike Clark	(United States) Richmond Kickers	Drafted in round 4 of the 1996 MLS Inaugural Player Draft.	February 6, 1996	
GK	(United States) Bo Oshoniyi	(United States) New York Centaurs	Drafted in round 5 of the 1996 MLS Inaugural Player Draft.	February 6, 1996	
MF	(United States) Brandon Ward	(United States) Hampton Roads Mariners	Drafted in round 6 of the 1996 MLS Inaugural Player Draft.	February 6, 1996	
DF	(United States) Janusz Michallik	(United States) New York Centaurs	Drafted in round 7 of the 1996 MLS Inaugural Player Draft.	February 7, 1996	
MF	(United States) Todd Yeagley	(United States) Richmond Kickers	Drafted in round 8 of the 1996 MLS Inaugural Player Draft.	February 7, 1996	
DF	(United States) Ramiro Corrales	(United States) California Jaguars	Drafted in round 9 of the 1996 MLS Inaugural Player Draft.	February 7, 1996	
FW	(Argentina) Marcelo Carrera	(United States) Canton Invaders	Drafted in round 10 of the 1996 MLS Inaugural Player Draft.	February 7, 1996	
DF	(United States) Shane Battelle	(United States) St. Louis Knights	Drafted in round 11 of the 1996 MLS Inaugural Player Draft.	February 7, 1996	
FW	(United States) Pete Marino	(Germany) Bayer Leverkusen	Drafted in round 12 of the 1996 MLS Inaugural Player Draft.	February 7, 1996	
FW	(Jamaica) Paul Young	(United States) Charleston Battery	Drafted in round 13 of the 1996 MLS Inaugural Player Draft.	February 7, 1996	
DF	(United States) Laurence Piturro	(United States) Long Island Rough Riders	Drafted in round 14 of the 1996 MLS Inaugural Player Draft.	February 7, 1996	
DF	(United States) Todd Haskins	(United States) Washington Warthogs	Drafted in round 15 of the 1996 MLS Inaugural Player Draft.	February 7, 1996	
MF	(United States) Manny Catano	(United States) Des Moines Menace	Drafted in round 16 of the 1996 MLS Inaugural Player Draft.	February 7, 1996	
FW	(United States) Mac Cozier	(United States) Charlotte 49ers	Drafted in round 1 of the 1996 MLS College Draft.	March 4, 1996	
FW	(United States) Ricci Greenwood	(United States) Seattle Pacific Falcons	Drafted in round 2 of the 1996 MLS College Draft.	March 4, 1996	
DF	(United States) Todd Miller	(United States) Westminster Griffins	Drafted in round 3 of the 1996 MLS College Draft.	March 4, 1996	
DF	(United States) Paul Caligiuri	(United States) FC St. Pauli	Drafted in round 1 of the 1996 MLS supplemental draft.	March 4, 1996	
MF	(United States) Michael Robles	(United States) Montclair Standard Falcons	Drafted in round 2 of the 1996 MLS supplemental draft.	March 4, 1996	
MF	(United States) Rob Smith	(United States) Delaware Wizards	Drafted in round 2 of the 1996 MLS supplemental draft.	March 4, 1996	
GK	(United States) Kevin East	(United States) Jersey Dragons	Drafted in round 3 of the 1996 MLS supplemental draft.	March 4, 1996	
GK	(United States) David Winner	(United States) Tampa Bay Cyclones		March 20, 1996	
FW	(Poland) Robert Warzycha	(Hungary) Budapest Honvéd	Signed via discovery.	June 4, 1996	
GK	(England) Ron Fearon	(England) Leyton Orient F.C.	Signed via discovery.	June 11, 1996	
FW	(United States) Dante Washington	(United States) Washington Warthogs	Signed as a free agent.	June 18, 1996	
DF	(Argentina) Ricardo Iribarren	(Argentina) Belgrano de Córdoba	Allocated by the league.	June 28, 1996	
GK	(Canada) Pat Harrington	(United States) Kansas City Wiz	Picked up on waivers.	June 30, 1996	
GK	(United States) Brad Friedel	(Turkey) Galatasaray	Rights traded from Dallas Burn for Dante Washington and a pick in the 1997 MLS supplemental draft.	August 9, 1996	
MF	(Jamaica) Altimont Butler	(United States) San Jose Clash	Traded for Mac Cozier	November 7, 1996	

=== Loan in ===
Pos.	Player	Parent club	Length/Notes	Beginning	End	Source
FW	(Nigeria) Obi Monome	(United States) Ohio Xoggz	Signed with Cleveland Crunch after his loan.	September 5, 1996	September 9, 1996	

=== Out ===
Pos.	Player	Transferred to	Fee/notes	Date	Source
DF	(United States) Ramiro Corrales	(United States) San Jose Clash	Traded for the 13th overall pick in the 1996 MLS supplemental draft.	February 7, 1996	
MF	(United States) Manny Catano	(United States) Hawaii Tsunami	Placed on waivers.	March 25, 1996	
MF	(United States) Michael Robles	(United States) San Fernando Valley Golden Eagles	Placed on waivers.	March 25, 1996	
DF	(United States) Laurence Piturro	(United States) Long Island Rough Riders	Placed on waivers.	April 3, 1996	
DF	(United States) Todd Haskins		Placed on waivers.	April 3, 1996	
GK	(United States) Kevin East	(United States) Central Jersey Riptide	Placed on waivers.	April 16, 1996	
FW	(Jamaica) Paul Young	(United States) South Carolina Shamrocks	Placed on waivers.	June 5, 1996	
MF	(United States) Brandon Ward	(United States) Richmond Kickers	Placed on waivers.	July 2, 1996	
DF	(United States) Mark Watson	(United States) New England Revolution	Placed on waivers.	July 16, 1996	
FW	(United States) Dante Washington	(United States) Dallas Burn	Traded for the rights to Brad Friedel and a pick in the 1997 MLS supplemental draft.	August 9, 1996	
GK	(England) Ron Fearon	(England) Chelmsford City		August 9, 1996	
FW	(United States) Mac Cozier	(United States) San Jose Clash	Traded for Altimont Butler	November 7, 1996	
GK	(United States) Bo Oshoniyi	(United States) Connecticut Wolves	Placed on waivers.	November 7, 1996	
GK	(Canada) Pat Harrington	(United States) Detroit Safari	Placed on waivers.	November 7, 1996	
DF	(United States) Shane Battelle	Retired	Placed on waivers.	November 7, 1996	
FW	(United States) Ricci Greenwood	(United States) Columbus Invaders	Placed on waivers.	November 7, 1996	

=== Loans out ===
Pos.	Player	Loanee club	Length/Notes	Beginning	End	Source
FW	(United States) Ricci Greenwood	(United States) Ohio Xoggz	Columbus retains right to recall	April 16, 1996	End Of Season	
DF	(United States) Todd Miller	(United States) Milwaukee Rampage	Columbus retains right to recall	April 16, 1996	End Of Season	

=== MLS Draft picks ===
Draft picks are not automatically signed to the team roster. Only those who are signed to a contract will be listed as transfers in. The picks for the Columbus Crew are listed below:

1996 Columbus Crew Inaugural Player Draft Picks
Round	Pick	Player	Position	Team
1	1	(United States) Brian McBride	FW	VfL Wolfsburg
2	11	(Canada) Mark Watson	DF	Vancouver 86ers
3	21	(United States) Billy Thompson	FW	Tampa Bay Terror
4	31	(United States) Mike Clark	DF	Richmond Kickers
5	41	(United States) Bo Oshoniyi	GK	New York Centaurs
6	51	(United States) Brandon Ward	MF	Hampton Roads Mariners
7	61	(United States) Janusz Michallik	DF	New York Centaurs
8	71	(United States) Todd Yeagley	MF	Richmond Kickers
9	81	(United States) Ramiro Corrales	DF	California Jaguars
10	91	(Argentina) Marcelo Carrera	FW	Canton Invaders
11	101	(United States) Shane Battelle	DF	St. Louis Knights
12	111	(United States) Pete Marino	FW	Bayer Leverkusen
13	121	(Jamaica) Paul Young	FW	Charleston Battery
14	131	(United States) Laurence Piturro	DF	Long Island Rough Riders
15	141	(United States) Todd Haskins	DF	Washington Warthogs
15	151	(United States) Manny Catano	MF	Des Moines Menace

1996 Columbus Crew College Draft Picks
Round	Pick	Player	Position	College
1	10	(United States) Mac Cozier	FW	UNC Charlotte
2	20	(United States) Ricci Greenwood	FW	Seattle Pacific
3	30	(United States) Todd Miller	DF	Westminster College

1996 Columbus Crew Supplemental Draft Picks
Round	Pick	Player	Position	Team
1	10	(United States) Paul Caligiuri	DF	FC St. Pauli
2	13	(United States) Michael Robles	MF	Montclair Standard Falcons
2	20	(United States) Rob Smith	MF	Delaware Wizards
3	30	(United States) Kevin East	GK	Jersey Dragons

== Awards ==
=== MLS Player of the Week ===
Week	Player	Opponent(s)	Link
2	(United States) Brian McBride	D.C. United	
4	(United States) Bo Oshoniyi	NY/NJ MetroStars	
6	(United States) Brian McBride	New England Revolution	
19	(United States) Adrián Paz	Dallas Burn; San Jose Clash	
21	(United States) Brad Friedel	LA Galaxy	
22	(United States) Brian Maisonneuve	Kansas City Wiz	
24	(United States) Brad Friedel	NY/NJ MetroStars; New England Revolution	

=== MLS Player of the Month ===
Month	Player	Stats	Link
September	(United States) Brad Friedel		

=== 1996 MLS All-Star Game ===
Starters

- FW Brian McBride

Reserves

- MF Doctor Khumalo

=== Postseason ===
MLS Executive of the Year

- Jamey Rootes

=== Crew Team Awards ===
- Most Valuable Player – Brian McBride
- Defensive Player of the Year – Brad Friedel
- Scoring Champion – Brian McBride
- Man of the Year – Todd Yeagley
- Coach's Award – Paul Caligiuri
