= List of Columbus Crew seasons =

The Columbus Crew are an American soccer team that has been part of Major League Soccer (MLS) since the inaugural season in 1996. The club has competed in the league and other competitions since it was formed.

== Key ==
Key to competitions

- Major League Soccer (MLS) – The top-flight of soccer in the United States, established in 1996.
- U.S. Open Cup (USOC) – The premier knockout cup competition in U.S. soccer, first contested in 1914.
- CONCACAF Champions Cup/CONCACAF Champions League – The premier competition in North American soccer since 1962. It went by the name of Champions' League from 2008-2023.

Key to colors and symbols

1st or W	Winners
2nd or RU	Runners-up
3rd	Third place
	Last place
♦	MLS Golden Boot
	Highest average attendance
Italics	Ongoing competition

Key to league record

- Season = The year and article of the season
- Div = Division/level on pyramid
- League = League name
- Pld = Games played
- W = Games won
- L = Games lost
- D = Games drawn
- GF = Goals for
- GA = Goals against
- GD = Goal difference
- Pts = Points
- PPG = Points per game
- Conf. = Conference position
- Overall = League position

Key to cup record

- DNE = Did not enter
- DNQ = Did not qualify
- NH = Competition not held or canceled
- QR = Qualifying round
- PR = Preliminary round
- GS = Group stage
- R1 = First round
- R2 = Second round
- R3 = Third round
- R4 = Fourth round
- R5 = Fifth round
- Ro16 = Round of 16
- QF = Quarterfinals
- SF = Semifinals
- F = Final
- RU = Runners-up
- W = Winners

== Seasons ==
Season	League										Position		Playoffs	USOC	Continental / Other		Average attendance (Note: Average attendance only includes statistics from regular season matches.)	Top goalscorer(s) (Note: Top goalscorer(s) includes all goals scored in the regular season, MLS Cup Playoffs, U.S. Open Cup, MLS is Back Tournament, CONCACAF Champions League, FIFA Club World Cup, and other competitive continental matches.)	
Season	League	Pld	W	L	D	GF	GA	GD	Pts	PPG	Conf.	Overall	Playoffs	USOC	Continental / Other		Average attendance	Name(s)	Goals
1996	MLS	32	15	17	-	59	60	−1	37	1.16	4th	8th	QF	DNE	DNE		18,950	(United States) Brian McBride	19
1997	MLS	32	15	17	-	42	41	+1	39	1.22	3rd	6th	SF	DNE	DNQ		15,043	(United States) Pete Marino	8
1998	MLS	32	15	17	-	67	56	+11	45	1.41	2nd	4th	SF	RU	DNQ		12,274	(Trinidad and Tobago) Stern John	30♦ (Note: John won the MLS Golden Boot (57 points))
1999	MLS	32	19	13	-	45	39	+9	48	1.41	2nd	6th	SF	SF	DNQ		17,696	(Trinidad and Tobago) Stern John	25
2000	MLS	32	11	16	5	48	58	−10	38	1.19	4th	10th	DNQ	QF	DNQ		15,451	(United States) Dante Washington	15
2001	MLS	26	13	7	6	49	36	+13	45	1.73	2nd	4th	QF	QF	CONCACAF Giants Cup	QF	17,511	(United States) Jeff Cunningham	14
2002	MLS	28	11	12	5	44	43	+1	38	1.36	2nd	6th	SF	W	DNQ		17,429	(United States) Jeff Cunningham	16
2003	MLS	30	10	12	8	44	44	0	38	1.27	5th	8th	DNQ	Ro16	CONCACAF Champions' Cup	QF	16,250	(United States) Brian McBride	12
2004	MLS	30	12	5	13	40	32	+8	49	1.63	1st	1st	QF	Ro16	DNQ		16,872	(United States) Edson Buddle	13
2005	MLS	32	11	16	5	34	45	–11	38	1.19	6th	10th	DNQ	Ro16	DNQ		12,916	(United States) Edson Buddle	9
2006	MLS	32	8	15	9	30	42	–12	33	1.03	6th	12th	DNQ	Ro16	DNQ		13,294	(United States) Jason Garey (Zimbabwe) Joseph Ngwenya	5
2007	MLS	30	9	11	10	39	44	–5	37	1.23	6th	9th	DNQ	QR1	DNQ		15,230	(Venezuela) Alejandro Moreno	7
2008	MLS	30	17	7	6	50	36	+14	57	1.90	1st	1st	W	QR3	DNQ		14,662	(Venezuela) Alejandro Moreno	10
2009	MLS	30	13	7	10	41	31	+10	49	1.63	1st	1st	QF	Ro16	DNQ		14,175	(Argentina) Guillermo Barros Schelotto	12
2010	MLS	30	14	8	8	40	34	+6	50	1.67	2nd	5th	QF	RU	CONCACAF Champions League	QF	14,642	(Argentina) Guillermo Barros Schelotto	9
2011	MLS	34	13	13	8	43	44	−1	47	1.38	4th	9th	R1	Ro16	CONCACAF Champions League	QF	12,185	(Peru) Andrés Mendoza	13
2012	MLS	34	15	12	7	44	44	0	52	1.53	6th	10th	DNQ	R3	DNQ		14,397	(Costa Rica) Jairo Arrieta (United States) Eddie Gaven	9
2013	MLS	34	12	17	5	42	46	−4	41	1.21	8th	16th	DNQ	Ro16	DNQ		16,080	(Ghana) Dominic Oduro	13
2014	MLS	34	14	10	10	52	42	+10	52	1.53	3rd	7th	QF	Ro16	DNQ		16,881	(Argentina) Federico Higuaín	12
2015	MLS	34	15	11	8	58	53	+5	53	1.56	2nd	4th	RU	Ro16	DNQ		16,985	(Sierra Leone) Kei Kamara	26
2016	MLS	34	8	14	12	50	58	−8	36	1.06	9th	18th	DNQ	Ro16	DNQ		17,125	(Norway) Ola Kamara	16
2017	MLS	34	16	12	6	53	49	+4	54	1.59	5th	5th	SF	R4	DNQ		15,439	(Norway) Ola Kamara	19
2018	MLS	34	14	11	9	43	45	−2	51	1.50	5th	10th	QF	R4	DNQ		12,447	(United States) Gyasi Zardes	20
2019	MLS	34	10	16	8	39	47	−8	38	1.12	10th	20th	DNQ	Ro16	DNQ		14,856	(United States) Gyasi Zardes	13
2020	MLS	23	12	6	5	36	21	+15	41	1.78	3rd	4th	W	NH	MLS is Back Tournament	Ro16	3,761	(United States) Gyasi Zardes	15
2021	MLS	34	13	13	8	46	45	+1	47	1.38	9th	17th	DNQ	NH	CONCACAF Champions League Campeones Cup	QF W	18,990	(Armenia) Lucas Zelarayán	13
2022	MLS	34	10	8	16	46	41	+5	46	1.35	8th	16th	DNQ	R3	DNQ		19,237	(Armenia) Lucas Zelarayán	10
2023	MLS	34	16	9	9	67	46	+21	57	1.68	3rd	3rd	W	Ro16	Leagues Cup	Ro32	20,286	(Colombia) Cucho Hernández	24
2024	MLS	34	19	6	9	72	40	+32	66	1.94	2nd	2nd	Ro16	DNE	CONCACAF Champions Cup Leagues Cup Campeones Cup	RU W RU	20,646	(Colombia) Cucho Hernández	25
2025	MLS	34	14	8	12	55	51	+5	54	1.59	7th	11th	R1	DNE	CONCACAF Champions Cup Leagues Cup	Ro16 GS	23,663	(Uruguay) Diego Rossi	16
Total		923	380	338	205	1,366	1,262	+104	1,319	1.43	—	—	—	—	—		—	(United States) Brian McBride	79
