= Brandon Ward =

Brandon Ward may refer to:

- Brandon Ward (soccer), American soccer midfielder
- Brandon Ward (racing driver), American professional stock car racing driver
- B. J. Ward (American football) (Brandon Jeffrey Ward), American football player
