= 1996 MLS College Draft =

College draft for soccer teams

The 1996 Major League Soccer College Draft was held on March 4, 1996, in Fort Lauderdale, Florida.

== History ==
As Major League Soccer prepared for its first season, the league began stocking teams with players. As the teams were being created at the same time, the league adopted a measured approach to building rosters. First, the league allocated four "big name" players to each team. Then on February 6 and 7, 1996, the league held its 1996 MLS Inaugural Player Draft. Over sixteen rounds, teams selected players from any source. Then on March 4, 1996, the league held a three-round draft of collegiate players. The 1996 MLS Supplemental Draft was held later the same day.

^	Denotes player who has been inducted to the US Soccer Hall of Fame

*	Denotes player who has been selected for an MLS Best XI team

== Round 1 ==
Pick #	MLS team	Player	Position	Affiliation
1	Kansas City Wiz (Note: #1: D.C. United → Kansas City Wiz. 3 March 1996: Kansas City Wiz acquired this first-round pick and goalkeeper Garth Lagerwey from D.C. United in exchange for goalkeeper Jeff Causey.)	Matt McKeon	M	St. Louis University
2	D.C. United (Note: #2: New York/New Jersey MetroStars → D.C. United. 3 March 1996: D.C. United acquired this first-round selection from New York/New Jersey MetroStars in exchange for first-round (#1) and third-round (#21) picks in the 1996 MLS Supplemental Draft.)	Eddie Pope	D	University of North Carolina
3	Dallas Burn (Note: #3: San Jose Clash → New York/New Jersey MetroStars → Dallas Burn. 4 March 1996: Dallas Burn acquired this first-round selection from New York/New Jersey MetroStars in exchange for a first-round pick (#8) in the 1996 MLS Supplemental Draft. On 26 February 1996, in the first trade in league history, New York/New Jersey had acquired this first-round pick and midfielder Rhett Harty from San Jose Clash in exchange for defender Troy Dayak.)	Brandon Pollard	D	University of Virginia
4	Tampa Bay Mutiny	Adam Frye	D	UCLA
5	Kansas City Wiz	Chris Snitko	GK	UCLA
6	New England Revolution	Paul Keegan	F	Boston College
7	Los Angeles Galaxy	Guillermo Jara	F	University of San Diego
8	Dallas Burn	Jeff Cassar	GK	Florida International University
9	Colorado Rapids	Mike Gentile	M	University of Wisconsin–Madison
10	Columbus Crew	Mac Cozier	F	UNC-Charlotte

== Round 2 ==
Pick #	MLS team	Player	Position	Affiliation
11	New York/New Jersey MetroStars (Note: #11: D.C. United → New York/New Jersey MetroStars. 4 March 1996: New York/New Jersey MetroStars acquired this second-round pick, a second-round selection (#11) in the 1996 MLS Supplemental Draft, and goalkeeper Matthew Olson from D.C. United in exchange for a first-round pick (#8) in the 1996 Supplemental Draft.)	Scott Lamphear	D	University of Wisconsin–Madison
12	New York/New Jersey MetroStars	Miles Joseph	F	Clemson University
13	San Jose Clash	Derick Brownell	F	Santa Clara University
14	Tampa Bay Mutiny	Casey Sweeney	M	Butler University
15	Kansas City Wiz	Diego Gutierrez	M	Rockhurst University
16	New England Revolution	Imad Baba	M	Clemson University
17	Los Angeles Galaxy	Greg Vanney	M	UCLA
18	Tampa Bay Mutiny (Note: #18: Dallas Burn → Tampa Bay Mutiny. 4 March 1996: Tampa Bay Mutiny acquired this second-round pick from Dallas Burn in exchange for a second-round selection (#14) in the 1996 MLS Supplemental Draft.)	Steve Ralston	M	Florida International University
19	Colorado Rapids	Paul Grafer	GK	William & Mary College
20	Columbus Crew	Ricci Greenwood	F	Seattle Pacific University

== Round 3 ==
Pick #	MLS team	Player	Position	Affiliation
21	D.C. United	Jesse Marsch	M	Princeton University
22	New York/New Jersey MetroStars	Hamisi Amani-Dove	F	Rutgers University
23	San Jose Clash	Eddie Lewis	F	UCLA
24	Tampa Bay Mutiny	Nate Daligcon	D	Seattle Pacific University
25	Kansas City Wiz	Dion Sebwe	D	Park University
26	New England Revolution	Paulo Dos Santos	M	University of Rhode Island
27	Los Angeles Galaxy	Ante Razov	F	UCLA
28	Dallas Burn	Brandon Cavitt	M	Sacramento State University
29	Colorado Rapids	PASS		
30	Columbus Crew	Todd Miller	M	Westminster College

=== Round 3 trades ===
No trades reported.
