= Sergio Herrera =

Sergio Herrera may refer to:

- Sergio Herrera (footballer, born 1981), Colombian football striker
- Sergio Herrera (footballer, born 1993), Spanish football goalkeeper
