= David Winner (soccer) =

American soccer player and coach

Personal information
- Full name: David Winner
- Date of birth: April 23, 1971 (age 55)
- Place of birth: Fort Lauderdale, Florida, United States
- Height: 6 ft 2 in (1.88 m)
- Position: Goalkeeper

Youth career
- 1990: FIU Golden Panthers
- 1992–1994: Tampa Spartans

Senior career*
Years	Team	Apps	(Gls)
1995	Tampa Bay Cyclones		
1996–1998	Columbus Crew	12	(0)
1998	New England Revolution	0	(0)
1998	Chicago Fire	0	(0)
1998	Miami Fusion	3	(0)
1998	Worcester Wildfire	4	(0)
1999	Kansas City Wizards	8	(0)
2000	Connecticut Wolves	8	(0)
2000	Atlanta Silverbacks	9	(0)
2000	New England Revolution	0	(0)
2001	Indiana Blast	24	(0)
2001	→ Miami Fusion (loan)	0	(0)

Managerial career
- 2001–2002: Butler Bulldogs (assistant)
- 2009–2010: Austin Aztex (assistant)
- * Club domestic league appearances and goals

David Winner is a retired American soccer goalkeeper who had an extensive career in Major League Soccer, USISL and the USL A-League.

== Player ==
=== Youth ===
Winner graduated from Western High School where he was a 1989 Parade Magazine High School All American soccer player. He attended Florida International University. After one season, he transferred to the University of Tampa. In 1992, the Spartans finished runner-up in the NCAA Division II Men's Soccer Championship. In 1994, Winner and his teammates won the NCAA Division II championship. He graduated in 1994 with a bachelor's degree in communications.

=== Professional ===
In 1995, Winner turned professional with the Tampa Bay Cyclones of the USISL Pro League. In 1996, he signed with the Columbus Crew of Major League Soccer. Winner spent two seasons with the Crew before being waived on June 1, 1998. In June 1998, he spent time with the New England Revolution. At the beginning of July, he spent a few games as a backup with the Chicago Fire. At the end of July, the Miami Fusion signed Winner to a short-term contract after injuries hit the Fusion goalkeeper corps. He finished the season with the Worcester Wildfire of the USL A-League. On February 7, 1999, the Colorado Rapids selected Winner in the second round (twentieth overall) of the 1999 MLS Supplemental Draft. The Rapids released him, but the Kansas City Wizards signed him in March after Tony Meola and Chris Snitko were both injured during the pre-season. On March 20, 2000, Winner signed with the Connecticut Wolves of the USL A-League. In August 2000, he moved to the Atlanta Silverbacks where he played nine games. On September 4, 2000, the New England Revolution signed him for the remainder of the season. In 2001, Winner joined the Indiana Blast of the USL A-League. In June, the Miami Fusion called him up as a backup goalkeeper.

== Coach ==
In 2009 and 2010 Winner served as the goalkeeper coach for the Austin Aztex of the USL First Division. In 2012, he was the GK Coach for the Austin Aztex (PDL). He currently is working with the Columbus Crew Academy a goalie coach.
