= Marco Ferruzzi =

American soccer coach

Personal information
- Date of birth: October 15, 1970 (age 56)
- Place of birth: San Antonio, Texas, United States
- Height: 5 ft 9 in (1.75 m)
- Position: Midfielder

Youth career
- 1989–1992: University of North Carolina

Senior career*
Years	Team	Apps	(Gls)
1990	San Antonio Generals		
1993–1995	San Antonio Pumas		
1995–1996	Tampa Bay Terror (indoor)	21	(6)
1996	Tampa Bay Cyclones	18	(3)
1997	Tampa Bay Mutiny	19	(0)
1998	→ Jacksonville Cyclones (loan)	2	(0)
1998	Los Angeles Galaxy	0	(0)
1998	Charleston Battery	19	(2)
1999–2002	Richmond Kickers	98	(15)
2003–2004	Minnesota Thunder	47	(8)

Managerial career
- 2004–2019: FC Dallas (assistant)
- 2008: FC Dallas (interim)
- 2019–2022: FC Dallas (director of soccer operations)
- 2021: FC Dallas (interim)
- * Club domestic league appearances and goals

Marco Ferruzzi (born October 15, 1970, in San Antonio, Texas) is an American soccer coach and former professional player, who is currently director of methodology for FC Dallas. Ferruzzi had a ten-year professional career playing as a midfielder in several indoor and outdoor leagues including Major League Soccer and the USL First Division.

== Youth ==
In 1987, Ferruzzi played in one game for the U.S. U-16 national team at the 1987 FIFA U-16 World Championship In 1989, he entered the University of North Carolina at Chapel Hill where he played on the men's soccer team from 1989 to 1992.

== Professional ==
In 1990, Ferruzzi spent the collegiate off season with the San Antonio Generals in the Southwest Independent Soccer League. In 1993, he turned professional when he signed with the San Antonio Pumas of the USISL. He played for the Pumas through the 1995 season. In the fall of 1995, he signed with the Tampa Bay Terror of the National Professional Soccer League. He spent only one season with the Terror before signing with the Tampa Bay Cyclones of the USISL in 1996. However, there are hints that he may have played for the Cyclones in 1995 as well. In February 1997, the Tampa Bay Mutiny selected Ferruzzi in the first round (sixth overall) of the 1997 MLS Supplemental Draft. He spent the 1997 season in Tampa Bay, assisting on two goals in nineteen games. The Mutiny waived Ferruzzi on November 13, 1997.

Ferruzzi returned to Major League Soccer the next year after the Los Angeles Galaxy picked him in the third round (30th overall) in the 1998 MLS Supplemental Draft. He never played for the team before being released but saw time in 19 games with the Charleston Battery in the USL A-League. In 1999, Ferruzzi signed with the Richmond Kickers, also of the USL A-League. He played four seasons in Richmond, going to the 2002 A-League championship where the Kickers fell to the Milwaukee Rampage. On April 5, 2003, the Minnesota Thunder acquired Ferruzzi's rights from the Richmond Kickers. He played two seasons in Minnesota and went to the finals again in 2003, this time falling to his former team, the Charleston Battery. That season, he was also named to the USL All Star team. Ferruzzi retired following the 2004 season.

== Coaching and management ==
In 2004, the Dallas Burn of Major League Soccer hired Ferruzzi as an assistant coach. Over the years, his responsibilities have included evaluating prospective players, overseeing the reserve team, and assisting in first team practices. On May 21, 2008, he was named the interim head coach after the team fired head coach Steve Morrow. After Schellas Hyndman was named head coach, Ferruzzi resumed his duties as an assistant. FC Dallas announced in January 2012 that Ferruzzi would add the duties of head coach of FC Dallas Reserves in addition to serving as senior team assistant coach. Ferruzzi continued to serve as an assistant coach under Óscar Pareja. After Pareja left, Ferruzzi became the director of soccer operations.

Upon the firing of Luchi Gonzalez on September 19, 2021, Ferruzzi was once again named interim coach of FC Dallas. After the season, Ferruzzi was not made the permanent head coach but given a new role as director of methodology.

== Coaching statistics ==
As of November 20, 2021

Coaching record by club and tenure
Team	From	To	Record					Ref.
Team	From	To	P	W	D	L	Win %	Ref.
FC Dallas	September 19, 2021	November 20, 2021	8	1	3	4	12.5	
Total			8	1	3	4	12.5	
