= Obi Moneme =

Nigerian-American soccer player

Personal information
- Full name: Obinna Ifeanyichukwu Moneme
- Place of birth: Nigeria
- Height: 6 ft 0 in (1.83 m)
- Position: Forward

College career
Years	Team	Apps	(Gls)
1992–95	Ohio Wesleyan Battling Bishops		(57)

Senior career*
Years	Team	Apps	(Gls)
1996	Columbus Xoggz		
1996	→ Columbus Crew (loan)	1	(0)
1996	Cleveland Crunch (indoor)	12	(2)
1996–1998	Milwaukee Wave (indoor)	66	(31)
- * Club domestic league appearances and goals

Obi Moneme is a retired Nigerian-American soccer player who played as a forward. Moneme is now a neurological physician for OhioHealth.

== College career ==
Moneme graduated high school from Mansfield Christian. Moneme played his collegiate career at Ohio Wesleyan, scoring 57 goals across his four years, ranking third in all-time goals for the Battling Bishops. Moneme started his career by scoring 7 goals with 6 assists in his freshman year, helping his team reach the national championship where they lost to Kean University. In his sophomore year, Moneme scored 21 goals, earning him first-team All-Region (Division III) and first-team All-Ohio (all divisions). In his junior year, he recorded 21 goals and 9 assists, once again earning first-team All-Region and All-Ohio honors. Despite not producing as many goals, Moneme was awarded NCAC Offensive Player of the Year and first-team All-American (Division III) in his senior year.

== Club career ==
After finishing his career at Ohio Wesleyan, Moneme joined the Columbus Xoggz. Shortly after, he joined the Columbus Crew, who were in their first season in the newly formed Major League Soccer. He only appeared once for the club, registering one assist in his 26 minutes in a 5–1 win over Kansas City on September 9, 1996. After his Moneme's short-lived MLS contract, he returned to the Xoggz.

Moneme began his indoor career in 1996 with the Cleveland Crunch in the National Professional Soccer League, where he scored two goals in his 12 appearances. In a mid-season trade, Moneme was sent to the Milwaukee Wave, where he would spend two seasons, scoring 31 goals in 66 regular season games. He also scored three goals in 13 playoff games for Milwaukee.

== International career ==
Moneme represented the United States with the under-23 collegiate team at the World University Games.

== Honors ==
=== Individual ===
Ohio Wesleyan

- NCAC Offensive Player of the Year: 1995
- NSCAA All-American (Division III): 1993 (second-team), 1994 (second-team), 1995 (first-team)
