= 1997 MLS supplemental draft =

College draft for soccer teams

The 1997 Major League Soccer supplemental draft was held in Fort Lauderdale, Florida on February 2, 1997.

*	Denotes player who has been selected for an MLS Best XI team

== Round 1 ==
Pick #	MLS team	Player	Position	Affiliation
1	Los Angeles Galaxy (Note: #1: Colorado Rapids → Columbus Crew → Los Angeles Galaxy. 2 February 1997: Los Angeles Galaxy acquired this first-round selection from Columbus Crew in exchange for midfielder Jorge Salcedo. Earlier the same day, Columbus had acquired this first-round pick from Colorado Rapids in exchange for a third-round pick (#23) in the 1997 Supplemental Draft and midfielder Adrián Paz.)	Danny Pena	D	Cincinnati Silverbacks
2	Dallas Burn (Note: #2: New England Revolution → Dallas Burn. 2 February 1997: Dallas Burn acquired this first-round pick from New England Revolution in exchange for a first-round selection (#3) in the 1997 Supplemental Draft and a third-round pick in the 1997 MLS College Draft.)	Wade Webber	D	University of Portland, Seattle Sounders
3	New England Revolution (Note: #3: Columbus Crew → Dallas Burn → New England Revolution. 2 February 1997: New England Revolution acquired this first-round pick and a third-round pick in the 1997 MLS College Draft from Dallas Burn in exchange for a first-round selection (#2) in the 1997 Supplemental Draft. On 9 August 1996, Dallas had acquired this first-round pick and defender Dante Washington from Columbus Crew in exchange for an allocation. Columbus used the allocation to sign goalkeeper Brad Friedel.)	Bill Harte	D	Loyola University, Baltimore Spirit
4	Dallas Burn (Note: #4: San Jose Clash → Dallas Burn. 2 February 1997: Dallas Burn acquired this first-round pick and a second-round pick (#20) in the 1997 Supplemental Draft from San Jose Clash in exchange for a second-round pick (#16) in the 1997 Supplemental Draft and defender Lawrence Lozzano.)	Dan Stebbins	F	University of Notre Dame, Milwaukee Rampage
5	New York/New Jersey MetroStars	Ezra Hendrickson	D	Drake University, New Orleans Shell Shockers
6	Tampa Bay Mutiny (Note: #6: Dallas Burn → Tampa Bay Mutiny. 31 January 1997: Tampa Bay Mutiny acquired this first-round selection and a third-round pick in the 1998 MLS College Draft from Dallas Burn in exchange for forward Peter Hattrup.)	Marco Ferruzzi	M	University of North Carolina, Tampa Bay Cyclones
7	Kansas City Wizards	Ryan Tinsley	M	Fresno State, San Diego Sockers (CISL)
8	D.C. United (Note: #8: Tampa Bay Mutiny → D.C. United. 2 February 1997: D.C. United acquired this first-round pick from Tampa Bay Mutiny in exchange for a first-round pick (#10) in the 1997 Supplemental Draft and a second-round pick in the 1998 MLS Supplemental Draft.)	Carlos Llamosa	D	New York Centaurs
9	Los Angeles Galaxy	Bryan Taylor	F	Fresno State, Central Coast Roadrunners
10	Tampa Bay Mutiny (Note: #10: D.C. United → Tampa Bay Mutiny. 2 February 1997: Tampa Bay Mutiny acquired this first-round pick and a second-round pick in the 1998 MLS Supplemental Draft from D.C. United in exchange for a first-round pick (#8) in the 1997 Supplemental Draft.)	David Moxom	D	Robert Morris University, Carolina Dynamo

== Round 2 ==
Pick #	MLS team	Player	Position	Affiliation
11	Colorado Rapids	Billy Baumhoff	M	University of South Carolina, Kansas City Wiz
12	New England Revolution	Patrick Olalere	F	Carson-Newman, California Jaguars
13	Columbus Crew	Jason Farrell	M	Seattle Pacific University, Seattle Sounders
14	D.C. United (Note: #14: San Jose Clash → D.C. United. 22 January 1997: D.C. United acquired this second-round pick from San Jose Clash in exchange for a second-round pick (#20) in the 1997 Supplemental Draft and midfielder Shawn Medved.)	Gerson Echeverry	F	Seton Hall University, Richmond Kickers
15	New York/New Jersey MetroStars	Braeden Cloutier	F	San Diego Sockers
16	San Jose Clash (Note: #16: Dallas Burn → San Jose Clash. 2 February 1997: San Jose Clash acquired this second-round pick and defender Lawrence Lozzano from Dallas Burn in exchange for a first-round pick (#4) and a second-round pick (#20) in the 1997 Supplemental Draft.)	Curt Onalfo	D	University of Virginia, Los Angeles Galaxy
17	Kansas City Wizards	Ricci Greenwood	F	Seattle Pacific University, Columbus Invaders
18	Tampa Bay Mutiny	Paulo Dos Santos	M	Rhode Island University, New England Revolution
19	Los Angeles Galaxy	John Jones	F	Sacramento State University, Sacramento Scorpions
20	Dallas Burn (Note: #20: D.C. United → San Jose Clash → Dallas Burn. 2 February 1997: Dallas Burn acquired this second-round pick and a first-round pick (#4) in the 1997 Supplemental Draft from San Jose Clash in exchange for a second-round pick (#16) in the 1997 Supplemental Draft and defender Lawrence Lozzano. On 22 January 1997, San Jose had acquired this second-round pick and midfielder Shawn Medved from D.C. United in exchange for a second-round pick (#14) in the 1997 Supplemental Draft.)	Joey Martinez	D	Milwaukee Rampage

== Round 3 ==
Pick #	MLS team	Player	Position	Affiliation
21	Colorado Rapids	Kerry Zavagnin	M	University of North Carolina, Raleigh Flyers
22	New England Revolution	Sam George	M	UCLA, Anaheim Splash
23	Colorado Rapids (Note: #23: Columbus Crew → Colorado Rapids. 2 February 1997: Colorado Rapids acquired this third-round selection and midfielder Adrián Paz from Columbus Crew in exchange for a first-round pick (#1) in the 1997 Supplemental Draft.)	Mike Britton	D	Syracuse University, Houston Hotshots
24	San Jose Clash	Edmundo Rodriguez	F	University of New Mexico, Tampa Bay Terror
25	New York/New Jersey MetroStars	Dave Stewart	F	El Paso Patriots
26	Dallas Burn	Eric Stempinski	F	University of Wisconsin–Milwaukee, Milwaukee Rampage
27	Tampa Bay Mutiny (Note: #27: Kansas City Wizards → Tampa Bay Mutiny. 9 January 1997: Tampa Bay Mutiny acquired this third-round pick and forward Alan Prampin from Kansas City Wizards in exchange for defender Steve Pittman.)	Mike Heald	M	University of Tampa, Tampa Bay Cyclones
28	Columbus Crew (Note: #28: Tampa Bay Mutiny → Columbus Crew. 2 February 1997: Columbus Crew acquired this third-round pick from Tampa Bay Mutiny in exchange for a third-round selection in the 1998 MLS Supplemental Draft.)	Billy Clifford	D	University of South Carolina, South Carolina Shamrocks
29	Los Angeles Galaxy	Travis Rinker	D	University of Bridgeport, Long Island Rough Riders
30	D.C. United	Joey Thieman	M	Princeton University, R. Charleroi S.C.
