= Ricci Greenwood =

American soccer player

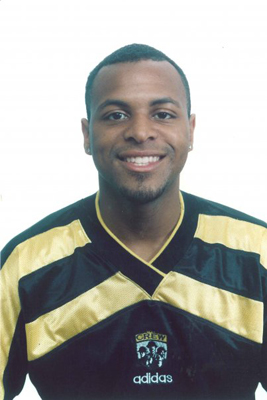

Personal information
- Date of birth: August 8, 1973 (age 53)
- Place of birth: Seattle, Washington, United States
- Height: 6 ft 2 in (1.88 m)
- Positions: Forward; midfielder

Youth career
- 1993–1995: Seattle Pacific University

Senior career*
Years	Team	Apps	(Gls)
1996	Columbus Crew	1	(0)
1996	→ Ohio Xoggz (loan)		
1996–1997	Columbus Invaders (indoor)	19	(8)
1997	El Paso Patriots	23	(3)
1998	Hampton Roads Mariners	20	(2)
1999–2001	1. FC Nürnberg	0	(0)
- * Club domestic league appearances and goals

Ricci Greenwood is a retired U.S. soccer player who played in Major League Soccer, USISL and the National Professional Soccer League.

Greenwood grew up in Washington state. He attended Federal Way High School where he was an All State soccer and All Conference basketball player. Following high school, he took classes, but did not play soccer, at Highline Community College. However, he continued to play club soccer with FC Heat which won the Washington State U-19 championship. In 1992, he entered Seattle Pacific University. He was a 1995 first team All American. In March 1996, the Columbus Crew selected Greenwood in the second round (20th overall) in the 1996 MLS College Draft. For 14 years he held the team record for least amount of time on field with seven minutes before being released. However, this record was broken in June 2010 by Sergio Herrera who played just 1 minute in his time with the Crew. He may have spent some of the season on loan to the Ohio Xoggz of the USISL during the season.

He signed with the Columbus Invaders of the National Professional Soccer League for the 1996–97 season. In February 1997, the Kansas City Wizards took him in the second round (17th overall) of the 1997 MLS Supplemental Draft, but never signed him. He then spent the 1997 season with the El Paso Patriots. In 1998, he played for the Hampton Roads Mariners of the USISL. From 1999–2001 he played for 1. FC Nürnberg in Germany.

Greenwood is now a soccer agent with 3 Star Sports & Entertainment Management.

Greenwood formerly held the distinction of having the least time on-field in Crew history at a mere 7 minutes. Sergio Herrera now holds the franchise mark with a single minute played, coming in 2010.
