= Diego Viera =

Uruguayan footballer (born 1972)

Personal information
- Date of birth: April 10, 1972 (age 54)
- Place of birth: Montevideo, Uruguay
- Height: 6 ft 2 in (1.88 m)
- Position: Striker

Senior career*
Years	Team	Apps	(Gls)
1990–1996	C.A. Cerro		
1996	Tampa Bay Mutiny	17	(5)
1996	→ Tampa Bay Cyclones (loan)		(1)
1998–1999	Florida ThunderCats (indoor)	9	(0)
- * Club domestic league appearances and goals

Diego Viera (born April 10, 1972 in Montevideo, Uruguay) is a Uruguayan football (soccer) forward who played professionally in Uruguay and Major League Soccer.

Viera began playing for C.A. Cerro in the Primera Division Uruguaya in 1990. On February 7, 1996, the Tampa Bay Mutiny selected Viera in the fifth round (forty-seventh overall) of the 1996 MLS Inaugural Player Draft. In 1998, he signed with the Florida ThunderCats in the National Professional Soccer League.
