= Roberto González (Argentine footballer) =

Argentine footballer

Personal information
- Full name: Roberto Ariel González
- Date of birth: April 11, 1974 (age 52)
- Place of birth: San Francisco, Argentina
- Position: Midfielder

Senior career*
Years	Team	Apps	(Gls)
1994–1995	Rosario Central		
2002–2004	Atlético Candelaria		
2005	Crucero del Norte		
2006	Atlético Candelaria		
2007	Crucero del Norte		
2008–2010	Argentino de Rosario		
2010–2011	Central Córdoba de Rosario		
2011	Chaco For Ever		
- * Club domestic league appearances and goals

Roberto González is an Argentine association football midfielder.

== Career ==
In 1994–95, González played for Rosario Central. In February 1996, the San Jose Clash selected him in the first round (third overall) of the 1996 MLS Supplemental Draft. On March 26, 1996, the Clash waived him. He played for numerous Argentinian teams during the 2000s.
