= MLS supplemental draft =

Major League Soccer supplemental draft details

The MLS supplemental draft had a number of incarnations in US soccer:

From 1996 to 1999, all players playing in the United States playing professionally in the United Soccer Leagues were eligible for the MLS Supplemental Draft, where they could be selected by all Major League Soccer teams. Players graduating college were entered into a separate MLS College Draft. The division between the two was eliminated in 2000, when they were combined into a single MLS SuperDraft.

- 1996 MLS supplemental draft
- 1997 MLS supplemental draft
- 1998 MLS supplemental draft
- 1999 MLS supplemental draft

In 2003, MLS held a Supplemental draft to distribute players who were signed by the league after the SuperDraft.

- 2003 MLS supplemental draft

From 2005 to 2008, with the expansion of developmental rosters, the creation of reserve teams, and contractual limits on the length of the MLS Superdraft included in the MLS Players Union Contract, MLS re-instituted the Supplemental draft, which was held after the SuperDraft those years.

- 2005 MLS supplemental draft
- 2006 MLS supplemental draft
- 2007 MLS supplemental draft
- 2008 MLS supplemental draft

In 2009 and 2010, due to roster changes resulting in fewer developmental spaces, MLS again discontinued the Supplemental Draft.

In January 2011, it was announced that the Supplemental Draft would be re-instated. The first two rounds of the Supplemental Draft replaced the last two rounds of the SuperDraft.

- 2011 MLS supplemental draft
- 2012 MLS supplemental draft
- 2013 MLS supplemental draft
