= 1996 MLS supplemental draft =

College draft for soccer teams

The 1996 Major League Soccer supplemental draft was held on March 4, 1996, in Fort Lauderdale, Florida.

== History ==
As Major League Soccer prepared for its first season, the league began stocking teams with players. As the teams were being created at the same time, the league adopted a measured approach to building rosters. First, the league allocated four "big name" players to each team. Then on February 6 and 7, 1996, the league held its 1996 MLS Inaugural Player Draft. Over sixteen rounds, teams selected players from any source. Then on March 4, the league held a three-round 1996 MLS College Draft. The 1996 MLS Supplemental Draft was held later the same day.

| ^ | Denotes player who has been inducted to the US Soccer Hall of Fame |

| * | Denotes player who has been selected for an MLS Best XI team |

== Round 1 ==
| Pick # | MLS team | Player | Position | Affiliation |
|---|---|---|---|---|
| 1 | New York/New Jersey MetroStars (Note: #1: D.C. United → New York/New Jersey MetroStars. 3 March 1996: New York/New Jersey MetroStars acquired this first-round selection and a third-round pick (#21) in the 1996 Supplemental Draft from D.C. United in exchange for a first-round selection (#2) in the 1996 MLS College Draft.) | Nicola Caricola | D | Genoa |
| 2 | New York/New Jersey MetroStars | Edmundo Rodriguez | M | Tampa Bay Terror |
| 3 | San Jose Clash | Roberto González | M | Rosario Central |
| 4 | Tampa Bay Mutiny | Evans Wise | M | SG Egelsbach |
| 5 | Kansas City Wiz | Pat Harrington | GK | Montreal Impact |
| 6 | New England Revolution | Alberto Naveda | F | Boca Juniors |
| 7 | Los Angeles Galaxy | Chris Armas | M | Long Island Rough Riders |
| 8 | D.C. United (Note: #8: Dallas Burn → New York/New Jersey MetroStars → D.C. United. 4 March 1996: D.C. United acquired this first-round pick from New York/New Jersey MetroStars in exchange for a second-round pick (#11) in the 1996 Supplemental Draft, a second-round selection (#11) in the 1996 MLS College Draft, and goalkeeper Matthew Olson. Earlier the same day, New York/New Jersey had acquired this first-round pick from Dallas Burn in exchange for a first-round selection (#3) in the 1996 MLS College Draft.) | Mario Gori | D | Rosario Central |
| 9 | Colorado Rapids | Dusty Hudock | GK | Seattle Sounders |
| 10 | Columbus Crew | Paul Caligiuri | D | FC St. Pauli |

== Round 2 ==
| Pick # | MLS team | Player | Position | Affiliation |
|---|---|---|---|---|
| 11 | New York/New Jersey MetroStars (Note: #11: D.C. United → New York/New Jersey MetroStars. 4 March 1996: New York/New Jersey MetroStars acquired this second-round pick, a second-round selection (#11) in the 1996 MLS College Draft, and goalkeeper Matthew Olson from D.C. United in exchange for a first-round pick (#8) in the 1996 Supplemental Draft.) | Juninho | M | Barra da Tijuca |
| 12 | New York/New Jersey MetroStars | Ken Hesse | D | Colorado Foxes |
| 13 | Columbus Crew (Note: #13: San Jose Clash → Columbus Crew. 4 March 1996: Columbus Crew acquired this second-round selection from San Jose Clash in exchange for defender Ramiro Corrales.) | Michael Robles | M | Montclair Standard Falcons |
| 14 | Dallas Burn (Note: #14: Tampa Bay Mutiny → Dallas Burn. 4 March 1996: Dallas Burn acquired this second-round pick from Tampa Bay Mutiny in exchange for a second-round selection (#18) in the 1996 MLS College Draft.) | Vagner | D | Lousano Paulista |
| 15 | Kansas City Wiz | David Moxom | D | Pittsburgh Stingers |
| 16 | New England Revolution | Wélton | F | América (Brazil) |
| 17 | Los Angeles Galaxy | David Vaudreuil | D | Baltimore Spirit |
| 18 | Dallas Burn | Chad Ashton | M | Wichita Wings |
| 19 | Colorado Rapids | Richard Sharpe | F | Cocoa Expos |
| 20 | Columbus Crew | Rob Smith | M | Delaware Wizards |

== Round 3 ==
| Pick # | MLS team | Player | Position | Affiliation |
|---|---|---|---|---|
| 21 | New York/New Jersey MetroStars (Note: #21: D.C. United → New York/New Jersey MetroStars. 3 March 1996: New York/New Jersey MetroStars acquired this third-round selection and a first-round pick (#1) in the 1996 Supplemental Draft from D.C. United in exchange for a first-round selection (#2) in the 1996 MLS College Draft.) | Tulio | F | XV de Piracicaba |
| 22 | New York/New Jersey MetroStars | Danny Barber | M | Las Vegas Dustdevils |
| 23 | San Jose Clash | James Woolridge | D | San Jose Grizzlies |
| 24 | Tampa Bay Mutiny | Boniface Okafor | F | Hannover 96 |
| 25 | Kansas City Wiz | Paul Wright | F | Sacramento Knights |
| 26 | New England Revolution | Zak Ibsen | D | Tampa Bay Terror |
| 27 | Los Angeles Galaxy | Chugger Adair | F | San Diego Sockers |
| 28 | Dallas Burn | Jonny Walker | GK | Memphis Jackals |
| 29 | Colorado Rapids | PASS | | |
| 30 | Columbus Crew | Kevin East | GK | Jersey Dragons |
