= Bo Oshoniyi =

American retired soccer player (born 1971)

Personal information
- Full name: Adegboyega Oshoniyi
- Date of birth: November 3, 1971 (age 54)
- Place of birth: Poughkeepsie, New York, United States
- Height: 6 ft 1 in (1.85 m)
- Position: Goalkeeper

Team information
- Current team: Vermont Academy(head coach)

College career
Years	Team	Apps	(Gls)
1990–1993	Southern Connecticut Owls		

Senior career*
Years	Team	Apps	(Gls)
1995	New York Centaurs	13	(0)
1996	Columbus Crew	13	(0)
1997	Connecticut Wolves	21	(0)
1998	Charleston Battery	27	(0)
1999	Atlanta Silverbacks	28	(0)
2000–2006	Kansas City Wizards	96	(0)
2000	→ Atlanta Silverbacks (loan)	2	(0)

Managerial career
- 2008: South Florida Bulls (assistant)
- 2009–2010: Wake Forest Demon Deacons (assistant)
- 2011–2014: Penn State Nittany Lions (assistant)
- 2014–2017: East Tennessee State Buccaneers
- 2018–2026: Dartmouth Big Green
- 2026-: Vermont Academy
- * Club domestic league appearances and goals

Adegboyega "Bo" Oshoniyi (born November 3, 1971) is an American former soccer player who played as a goalkeeper and spent eight seasons in Major League Soccer. Having parted ways with Dartmouth after eight years, he is now the head men's soccer coach at Vermont Academy.

== Career ==
Oshoniyi's Nigerian father drowned when Bo was four years old. He played college soccer at Southern Connecticut State University, where he helped lead the team to Division II championships in 1990 and 1992. He finished his career at the school with a record of 67 wins, 8 losses, and 7 ties. He is regarded as the finest goalkeeper ever at the University.

== Professional ==
=== Columbus Crew ===
Upon the creation of MLS, Oshoniyi was selected in the fifth round of the 1996 MLS Inaugural Player Draft by the Columbus Crew. Oshoniyi had a notable assist in the first ever Crew home game on a long punt that found Brian McBride. Oshoniyi posted a 3–10 record. He started 13 games with the Crew, but was beaten out for the job by Brad Friedel, who was acquired in mid-season. Oshoniyi was released by the Crew after 1996 along with 3rd string keeper Pat Harrington.

=== A-League / USL ===
In 1997 he played the next year with the Connecticut Wolves of the First Division. He moved to the Charleston Battery in 1998, and the Atlanta Silverbacks in 1999.

=== New England Revolution ===
Oshoniyi returned to MLS in 2000, when he was selected 39th overall in the MLS SuperDraft by the New England Revolution. He was traded by New England halfway through the preseason to the Kansas City Wizards for allocation money. He appeared in 1 preseason game for the Revolution, shutting out the Miami Fusion.

=== Kansas City Wizards ===
Oshoniyi played one game with the Kansas City Wizards, shutting out the San Jose Earthquakes while Meola was away with the National Team. It was Oshoniyi's first league game in 3 years. He was part of their MLS Cup-winning squad. An injury scare to Meola almost called Oshoniyi into duty early on in the 2000 season against the San Jose Earthquakes. In 2001 Oshoniyi was called into action for 11 games while Tony Meola was out injured posting a 4–5–1 record. He recorded 1 assist during the season. In 2002 while Meola was away with the National Team he again appeared in 13 games posting a 3–5–4 record on the year. 2003, he only appeared in 13 minutes of game action on the season when Meola picked up an injury. 2004 posted a career high 5–2–2 record after taking the starting job away from Tony Meola toward the end of the season, and was named the starting goalkeeper for the MLS Cup playoffs. He posted 5 shutouts in the final 9 games of the season going into the playoffs, recorded an assist in the final game of the season as well. He posted a 2–2 record in the playoffs, and was named the MLS Cup starting goalkeeper in a losing effort to D.C. United. Oshoniyi was named the starting goalkeeper going into the 2005 season, posting a career high 32 games, and an 11–9–12 record. He posted a career high in shutouts with 7, and finished 3rd in 2005 all star voting behind Pat Onstad and Matt Reis. In 2006 he had a 9–12–8 record. He enjoyed much success with the Wizards, posting a career total 36–43–27 record and 24 shutouts. Oshoniyi wasn't retained after the 2006 season when new head coach Curt Onalfo took over replacing him with Kevin Hartman. Oshoniyi was offered a trial with the Colorado Rapids and Houston Dynamo but declined the invitation electing to retire and move into the coaching full time.

== Career statistics ==
As of August 22, 2006

Club	Season	Apps.	Saves	Clean Sheets
Kansas City Wizards	2006	29	95	5
Kansas City Wizards	2005	32	112	7
Kansas City Wizards	2004	9	42	5
Kansas City Wizards	2003	1	0	0
Kansas City Wizards	2002	13	55	1
Kansas City Wizards	2001	11	48	3
Kansas City Wizards	2000	1	2	1
Columbus Crew	1996	13	64	2

== Head coaching record ==
Record table
Season	Coach	Overall	Conference	Standing	Postseason
East Tennessee State (Southern Conference) (2014–2017)
2014	East Tennessee State Buccaneers	7–10–1	3–6–1	5th of 6	
2015	East Tennessee State Buccaneers	8–7–4	4–4–2	4th of 6	
2016	East Tennessee State Buccaneers	12–5–3	7–1–2	1st of 6	NCAA 1st round
2017	East Tennessee State Buccaneers	9–2–7	6–0–4	1st of 6	
East Tennessee State Buccaneers:		36–24–15 .580			
Dartmouth College (Ivy League) (2019–present)
2018	Dartmouth Big Green	7–5–5	4–1–2	3rd	
2019	Dartmouth Big Green				
Dartmouth Big Green:		7–5–5 (.559)	4–1–2 (.714)		
Total:		43–29–20 .576			
National champion Postseason invitational champion Conference regular season champion Conference regular season and conference tournament champion Division regular season champion Division regular season and conference tournament champion Conference tournament champion
