= Mac Cozier =

American former soccer player (born 1973)

Personal information
- Date of birth: October 23, 1973 (age 53)
- Place of birth: Orange Park, Florida, U.S.
- Height: 5 ft 8 in (1.73 m)
- Positions: Forward; midfielder

Youth career
- 1992–1995: UNC Charlotte

Senior career*
| Years | Team | Apps | (Gls) |
| 1996 | Columbus Crew | 13 | (0) |
| 1996–1997 | Columbus Invaders (indoor) | 1 | (0) |
| 1997 | Richmond Kickers | 24 | (4) |
| 1998 | Deportes Antofagasta | 26 | (10) |
| 1999 | Jacksonville Cyclones | 26 | (13) |
| 2000–2002 | Charleston Battery | 82 | (26) |
| 2003–2004 | Atlanta Silverbacks | 54 | (14) |
| Total | | 226 | (67) |

International career
| 1996 | United States | 1 | (0) |
- * Club domestic league appearances and goals

Mac Cozier (born October 23, 1973) is an American retired soccer player. He played one season in Major League Soccer, one in the Chilean Second Division, one in USISL and six in the USL First Division. He also earned one cap with the United States national team in 1996.

== College ==
Cozier attended University of North Carolina at Charlotte, where he played on the men's team from 1992 to 1995. His best was 1994 when he was named a first team All-American. He finished his career as the school's all time, fourth on the career goals list and second on the career point.

== Professional ==
The Columbus Crew of Major League Soccer selected Cozier in the first round (tenth overall) of the 1996 MLS College Draft. He played games for the Crew. The Crew traded to the San Jose Clash, but the Clash released him. He signed the Richmond Kickers for the 1997 USISL season. He moved to Chilean Second Division club Deportes Antofagasta. After one season, in which he scored, returned to the States to sign with the Jacksonville Cyclones of the USL A-League. Cozier scored goals. The next season, he moved to the Charleston Battery. The Battery released Cozier following the 2002 season and he signed with the Rochester Raging Rhinos. However, the Rhinos diseased him on April 24, 2003, and he was immediately signed by the Atlanta Silverbacks. In 2004, he was named to the second-team USL All-Star team after scoring goals in games with Atlanta. He retired.

== Indoor soccer ==
Cozier played one game with the Columbus Invaders during the 1996–1997 National Professional Soccer League season.

== National team ==
Cozier played extensively with the U-23 national team in 1995. Cozier earned his only cap with the U.S. national team in a 4–1 loss to Peru on October 19, 1996. Cozier, along with several teammates that day, was called up when the regular national team players went on strike and refused to play. Cozier entered the game in the thirty-second minute, replacing Jean Harbor.

== Teaching ==
Since retiring from playing professionally, Cozier moved to Jacksonville, Fl. to become a teacher at both Englewood High School and at FSCJ. In 2020, he began teaching statistics at Douglas Anderson School of the Arts in Jacksonville, Florida.
