= Laurence Piturro =

American soccer player and coach

Larry Piturro
Personal information
- Full name: Laurance M. Piturro
- Date of birth: October 31, 1969 (age 57)
- Place of birth: Yonkers, New York, U.S.
- Height: 6 ft 0 in (1.83 m)
- Position: Defender

Youth career
- 1987–1988: Westchester Community College
- 1989–1990: Southern Connecticut State University

Senior career*
Years	Team	Apps	(Gls)
1993–1994	Connecticut Wolves		
1995–2001	Long Island Rough Riders		
2002–2004	Westchester Flames	48	(0)
2005	Long Island Rough Riders	7	(0)

Managerial career
- 1998–1999: Concordia College, Bronxville (assistant)
- 2000–2007: Concordia College, Bronxville
- * Club domestic league appearances and goals

Laurance "Larry" Piturro (born October 31, 1969) is an American retired soccer defender and coach. He spent eight years with the Long Island Rough Riders and three with the Westchester Flames. He was also the head coach of the Concordia College, Bronxville women's soccer team from 2000 to 2007.

== Player ==
Piturro began his collegiate career at Westchester Community College where he was a 1988 Second Team JUCO All American soccer player. He then transferred to Southern Connecticut State University, playing on the men's soccer team in 1989 and 1990. In 1993 and 1994, he played for the Connecticut Wolves. In 1995, he played twenty regular season games with the Long Island Rough Riders as they won the USISL championship. In February 1996, the Columbus Crew selected Piturro in the 14th round (131st overall) of the 1996 MLS Inaugural Player Draft but was not signed by the team. He remained with Long Island until 2001 when it was in the USL A-League. That spring, he played for the Tampa Bay Mutiny in pre-season exhibition games. In 2002, he moved to the Westchester Flames. In 2005, he returned to the Rough Riders for one more season before retiring.

== Coach ==
On November 2, 1998, Concordia College, Bronxville hired Piturro as an assistant coach for the women's soccer team. He became head coach in August 2000.
