= Ron Fearon =

English footballer

Personal information
- Full name: Ronald Thomas Fearon
- Date of birth: 19 November 1960 (age 65)
- Place of birth: Romford, England
- Height: 6 ft 0 in (1.83 m)
- Position: Goalkeeper

Youth career
- Dover

Senior career*
Years	Team	Apps	(Gls)
1980–1983	Reading	61	(0)
1983–1987	Sutton United		
1987–1989	Ipswich Town	28	(0)
1988	→ Brighton & Hove Albion (loan)	7	(0)
1989–1991	Wichita Wings (indoor)	47	(0)
1991–1992	Sutton United		
1992	Walsall	1	(0)
1992–1993	Sutton United		
1993–1994	Southend United	0	(0)
1994–1995	Ashford Town	15	(0)
1995–1996	Leyton Orient	18	(0)
1996	Columbus Crew	0	(0)
1996–1997	Chelmsford City	10	(0)
1997–1998	Dover Athletic	27	(0)
1998–1999	Barnet		
1999–2000	Hendon	3	(0)
- * Club domestic league appearances and goals

Ronald Thomas Fearon (born 19 November 1960) is an English retired professional football goalkeeper. He made 115 appearances in the Football League, as well as 47 appearances in the Major Indoor Soccer League for the Wichita Wings.

In 1984, he trained with the San Diego Sockers of the Major Indoor Soccer League (MISL) while visiting his wife's family who lived in California. In 1989, Terry Nicholl, coach of the Wichita Wings of the MISL called Fearon and invited him to a trial. At the time, Ipswich Town was asking for a transfer fee of approximately £140,000. Ipswich Town waived the fee for the transfer to the Wings. He signed with the Wings on 1 October 1989. In the summer of 1990, West Bromwich Albion expressed an interest in signing Fearon, but he decided to extend his contract with the Wings after Ipswich Town reinstated the transfer fee now that Fearon was returning to England.

On 12 June 1996, Fearon signed with the Columbus Crew of Major League Soccer. He played no games and was soon back in England.

In September 1999, he joined Hendon as cover for the injured Gary McCann and made five league and cup appearances in his single season at the club.
