= Sergio Herrera (footballer, born 1981) =

Colombian footballer

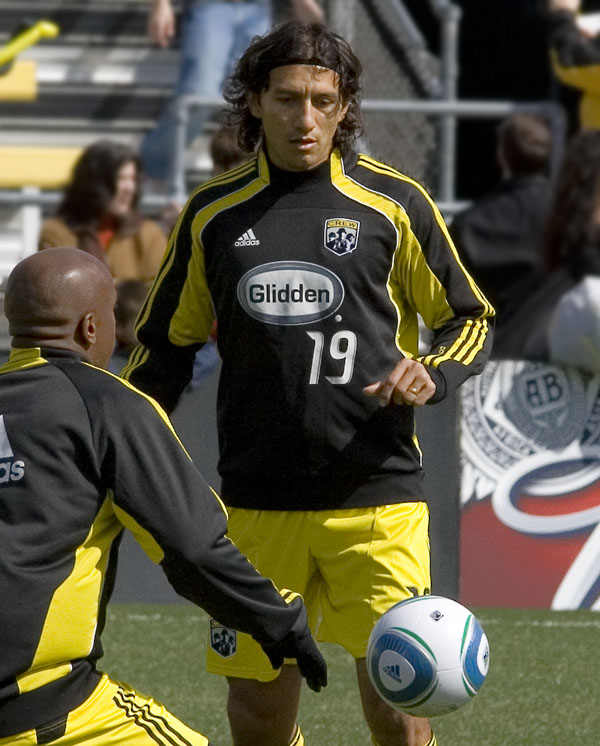

Personal information
- Full name: Sergio Darío Herrera Month
- Date of birth: 15 March 1981 (age 45)
- Place of birth: Barrancabermeja, Colombia
- Height: 6 ft 0 in (1.83 m)
- Position: Striker

Team information
- Current team: Deportivo Táchira (assistant manager)

Senior career*
| Years | Team | Apps | (Gls) |
| 1999 | Alianza Petrolera | 4 | (0) |
| 1999 | Almagro | 2 | (0) |
| 2000–2002 | América de Cali | 3 | (0) |
| 2003 | Alianza Petrolera | 28 | (25) |
| 2004 | América de Cali | 22 | (13) |
| 2004–2006 | Al-Ittihad | 11 | (4) |
| 2006 | Atlético Paranaense | 15 | (1) |
| 2007–2009 | Deportivo Cali | 93 | (33) |
| 2010 | Columbus Crew | 1 | (0) |
| 2011 | Deportivo Táchira | 56 | (27) |
| 2012 | Deportes Quindío | 10 | (6) |
| 2013 | Once Caldas | 25 | (11) |
| 2014 | Santa Fe | 12 | (2) |
| 2014–2015 | Deportivo Cali | 19 | (3) |
| 2016 | Deportivo Táchira | 32 | (8) |

International career^{‡}
| 2004–2008 | Colombia | 11 | (4) |

Managerial career
- 2017–2018: Universitario Popayán (assistant)
- 2018–2020: Alianza Petrolera (assistant)
- 2022–2023: Deportivo Cali (assistant)
- 2023: Deportivo Cali (caretaker)
- 2024: Deportivo Cali
- 2025: Deportivo Cali (assistant)
- 2025: Deportivo Cali (caretaker)
- 2025–: Deportivo Táchira (assistant)
- * Club domestic league appearances and goals as of 24 December 2016 ‡ National team caps and goals as of 15 June 2012

Sergio Darío Herrera Month (born 15 March 1981 in Barrancabermeja) is a Colombian football manager and former player who played as a forward. He is the current assistant manager of Venezuelan club Deportivo Táchira.

== Career ==
Herrera began his career in 1999 with Alianza Petrolera, but stayed for just one season before moving to play in the Argentine Second Division with Club Almagro. However, he was soon on the move again, going back to Colombia and signing for América de Cali for the start of the 2000 Mustang Cup, which he won with América. He stayed in Cali for three seasons before moving back to the club where he had started, Alianza Petrolera, where he again stayed for only one season before he switched back to América de Cali where he had a successful season, scoring 13 goals in 22 matches.

This sparked the interest of Saudi Premier League side Al Ittihad. However, he struggled to make an impact in Saudi Arabia and transferred to Brazil to play with Atlético Paranaense.

On 5 February 2010, Columbus Crew of MLS signed the Colombian forward from Deportivo Cali on an undisclosed terms.

He was named to the 18-man roster for the Crew's CONCACAF Champions League quarterfinal first leg against Deportivo Toluca of Mexico on 9 March 2010 in Columbus, Ohio, but did not enter the match. Herrera was again an unused substitute for the Black & Gold in the return leg at Deportivo Toluca on 17 March 2010 in Toluca, Mexico.

He was released on 29 June 2010 having played just one league minute for the Crew. This broke the previous club record for fewest career minutes held by Ricci Greenwood with 7, set 14 years earlier during the team's inaugural season. After his release from the Crew, Herrera signed for Venezuelan club Deportivo Táchira.

== Career statistics ==
=== International ===
Appearances and goals by national team and year
| National team | Year | Apps | Goals |
|---|---|---|---|
| Colombia | 2004 | 7 | 4 |
| Colombia | 2005 | 1 | 0 |
| Colombia | 2007 | 2 | 0 |
| Colombia | 2008 | 1 | 0 |
| Total | | 11 | 4 |

Scores and results list Colombia's goal tally first, score column indicates score after each Herrera goal.

List of international goals scored by Sergio Herrera
| No. | Date | Venue | Opponent | Score | Result | Competition | Ref. |
|---|---|---|---|---|---|---|---|
| 1 | 18 February 2004 | Estadio Nacional Chelato Uclés, Tegucigalpa, Honduras | Honduras | 1–1 | 1–1 | Friendly | |
| 2 | 6 June 2004 | Estadio Metropolitano Roberto Meléndez, Barranquilla, Colombia | Uruguay | 5–0 | 5–0 | 2006 FIFA World Cup qualification | |
| 3 | 27 June 2004 | Miami Orange Bowl, Miami, United States | Argentina | 2–0 | 2–0 | Friendly | |
| 4 | 24 July 2004 | Estadio Garcilaso, Cusco, Peru | Uruguay | 1–1 | 1–2 | 2004 Copa América | |

== Honors ==
=== América de Cali ===
- Copa Mustang (3): 2000, 2001, 2002

=== Al-Ittihad ===
- Crown Prince Cup (1): 2004
- AFC Champions League (1): 2005
