= Wélton =

Wélton is a given name. Notable people with the name include:

- Wélton Araújo Melo (born 1975), Brazilian footballer
- Wélton Felipe Marcos Soares (born 1986), Brazilian footballer

== See also ==
- Melton (surname)
