= Shane Battelle =

American soccer player (born 1971)

Personal information
- Date of birth: October 5, 1971 (age 55)
- Place of birth: Florissant, Missouri, U.S.
- Height: 6 ft 0 in (1.83 m)
- Position: Defender

College career
Years	Team	Apps	(Gls)
1990	SMU Mustangs		
1991–1993	Saint Louis Billikens		

Senior career*
Years	Team	Apps	(Gls)
1994–1995	St. Louis Ambush (indoor)		
1995	St. Louis Knights		
1996	Columbus Crew	15	

International career
1990–1994	United States U20		
- * Club domestic league appearances and goals

Shane Battelle (born October 5, 1971) is an American retired soccer player who played with the Columbus Crew in Major League Soccer.

== College ==
After capping off his senior year at Hazelwood Central High School with a state championship, Missouri Player of the Year honors, and being named a Parade Magazine All-American, Battalle spent one season (1990) playing soccer at Southern Methodist University. He was named to the Soccer America Magazine Freshman All-American Team as one of the best 11 freshmen in the entire country that year. In 1991, he transferred to St. Louis University, where he played for the men's soccer team. SLU finished the 1991 season ranked second in the nation. Battelle was team captain his senior year. The Billikens went to the quarterfinals of the NCAA Division I post-season tournament that season, and Battelle was selected as a 1993 first-team All-American. Battelle was also nominated for the MAC Award and Hermann Trophy as the best player in college soccer but finished behind Claudio Reyna in the voting. He was inducted to the Saint Louis University Hall of Fame in 1999 with teammate and longtime friend Brian McBride.

== Professional ==
In January 1994, the St. Louis Ambush selected Battelle in the first round of the National Professional Soccer League draft. The Ambush went on to win the NPSL Championship that season. In the summer of 1995, he played for the St. Louis Knights in the USISL In February 1996, the Columbus Crew of Major League Soccer selected Battelle in the 1996 MLS Inaugural Player Draft. Battelle spent one season playing for Columbus, starting at defensive center midfield. A knee injury suffered that season ended his career.

== International ==
In 1990, Battelle played with the United States U-20 National Soccer Team (US U-20) in its bid to qualify for the 1991 FIFA World Youth Championship. Battelle also played with the U.S. National B Team, a group of the best college players in the country who were seen as prospects for the full U.S. National Team, from 1992 to 1994. The full National Team, at that time, was composed only of players who had graduated from college. This period included a win over Trinidad & Tobago in Trinidad. He was co-captain of the U.S. at the 1993 World University Games along with Claudio Reyna, scoring key goals in wins against Ireland and Australia, and notching two goals and an assist in a victory over Nigeria. Battelle also played in the 1990 U.S. Olympic Festival, captaining the North team to the gold medal.
