= Todd Miller (soccer) =

American soccer player

Personal information
- Date of birth: November 29, 1973 (age 52)
- Place of birth: Salt Lake City, Utah, United States
- Height: 6 ft 1 in (1.85 m)
- Position: Midfielder

Youth career
- 1992–1995: Westminster College

Senior career*
Years	Team	Apps	(Gls)
1996–1997	Columbus Crew	6	(0)
1996	→ Milwaukee Rampage (loan)	30	(0)
1997–2000	Charleston Battery	97	(12)
- * Club domestic league appearances and goals

Todd Miller (born November 29, 1973) is an American soccer midfielder who currently plays for the amateur Olympique Montreux. He spent two seasons with the Columbus Crew and four in the USISL and A-League.

Miller grew up in Salt Lake City, graduating from Alta High School in 1992. He then attended Salt Lake City's Westminster College where he played on the school's NAIA soccer team from 1992 to 1995. While playing for Westminster College, Miller was selected to the U.S. National Amateur Team. He graduated with dual degree in mathematics and computer science.

In February 1996, the Columbus Crew selected Miller in the 3rd round (30th overall) of the 1996 MLS College Draft. The Crew sent him to the Milwaukee Rampage of the USISL as a developmental player.

In 1997, the Crew sent him on loan to the Charleston Battery before releasing him in July. He then signed with Battery. He played for the Battery through the 2000 season. He then returned to Salt Lake City where he played for the amateur International FC until 2005 when he moved to Olympique Montreux.
