= Cle Kooiman =

American soccer player

Personal information
- Full name: Christopher Clemence Kooiman
- Date of birth: July 3, 1963 (age 63)
- Place of birth: Ontario, California, United States
- Height: 6 ft 1 in (1.85 m)
- Position: Defender

College career
Years	Team	Apps	(Gls)
–1982	San Diego State Aztecs		

Senior career*
Years	Team	Apps	(Gls)
1982–1987	Los Angeles Lazers (indoor)	157	(10)
1989	California Kickers		
1990	San Diego Nomads		
1990–1991	Cobras de Ciudad Juárez	28	(1)
1992–1994	Cruz Azul	51	(2)
1994–1996	Atlético Morelia		
1996–1997	Tampa Bay Mutiny	54	(3)
1998	Miami Fusion	14	(0)

International career
1993–1994	United States	12	(1)

Managerial career
- United States U20 (assistant)
Medal record
Representing United States
Runner-up	CONCACAF Gold Cup	1993
Men's Soccer
- * Club domestic league appearances and goals

Christopher Clemence "Cle" Kooiman (born July 3, 1963) is an American former soccer defender. He played professionally in both Mexico and the United States including the first Major Indoor Soccer League, Western Soccer Alliance, American Professional Soccer League and Major League Soccer. He earned twelve caps, scoring one goal, with the U.S. national soccer team in 1993 and 1994. He was a member of the U.S. team at the 1994 FIFA World Cup.

== Club career ==
=== College ===
Cle Kooiman was born in Ontario, California, and attended San Diego State University. In 1982, he was named to the All Far West team.

=== MISL ===
In 1982, Kooiman began his professional career playing for the Los Angeles Lazers of the Major Indoor Soccer League. He would remain with the Lazers until 1987.

=== WSL/APSL ===
In 1989, he began his outdoor professional career with the California Kickers of the Western Soccer League (WSL). That year, he was named as a league First Team All Star. He moved to the San Diego Nomads for the 1990 season. However, by that time, the WSL had merged with the American Soccer League to form the American Professional Soccer League.

=== Mexico ===
At the end of the 1990, Kooiman moved to Mexico. He began with Cobras de Ciudad Juarez, of the Mexican Premier Division before moving to Cruz Azul in Mexican Premier League. While with Cruz Azul, he became the first U.S. citizen to captain a Mexican soccer team. In 1994, he moved to Atlético Morelia.

=== MLS ===
In 1996, the newly established Major League Soccer (MLS) distributed "marque" players throughout the league's teams. Kooiman was allocated to the Tampa Bay Mutiny. He would play two seasons with the Mutiny, but at the end of the 1997 season, the Mutiny left him exposed in the 1997 MLS Expansion Draft. The Miami Fusion selected Kooiman in the first round (14th overall) and he would play a single season for that team.

== International ==
Kooiman earned his first cap with the national team in 1993. He would eventually play 12 games with the national team, scoring a single goal and participating in the 1994 FIFA World Cup, where he played the full 90 minutes in the U.S.'s opening game against Switzerland.

== Personal life ==
Kooiman was diagnosed with aggressive prostate cancer in February 2018.

== Honors ==
individual

- MLS All-Star: 1996
