= Adrián Paz =

Uruguayan footballer (born 1966)

Personal information
- Full name: Adrián Gustavo Paz Charquero
- Date of birth: 9 September 1966 (age 60)
- Place of birth: Montevideo, Uruguay
- Height: 5 ft 10 in (1.78 m)
- Positions: Attacking midfielder; striker

Senior career*
Years	Team	Apps	(Gls)
1986–1987	Bella Vista		
1987–1988	Vélez Sársfield	28	(3)
1988–1991	Bella Vista		
1991–1992	Peñarol		
1992–1994	Estudiantes de La Plata	48	(6)
1994–1995	Ipswich Town	18	(1)
1995	Shanghai Pudong		
1996	Columbus Crew	27	(6)
1997–1998	Colorado Rapids	53	(6)
1999	Tianjin Teda	1	(0)
2000	Bella Vista	15	(2)
2000	Qingdao Etsong	4	(1)
Total		194	(25)

International career
1992–2000	Uruguay	10	(3)
- * Club domestic league appearances and goals

Adrián Gustavo Paz Charquero (born 9 September 1966) is a Uruguayan football coach and former professional footballer.

He played as a midfielder, notably in the Premier League for Ipswich Town who were his only team in European football. He also had notable spells across North and South America for Vélez Sársfield, Estudiantes de La Plata, Columbus Crew and Colorado Rapids. He also had spells in China with Shanghai Pudong, Tianjin Teda and Qingdao Etsong and had brief spells with Bella Vista and Peñarol. He was capped 10 times by Uruguay, scoring once.

== Club career ==
After playing in Uruguay and Argentina, Paz moved to Ipswich Town during the 1994–95 season in a joint transfer with the Argentinian defender Mauricio Taricco. He became the first Uruguayan to play in the English Premier League. In January 1996, Major League Soccer began allocating players to its newly established teams. Paz was sent to the Columbus Crew where he played 27 games. On February 1, 1997, the Crew sent Paz to the Colorado Rapids in exchange for the first-round selection in the 1997 MLS Supplemental Draft. He spent two seasons in Colorado before moving to Tianjin Teda in 1999. He only played one game for Tianjin as he suffered a serious injury during his first game, against Shanghai Shenhua, and was out injured until the end of 1999. He rejoined Bella Vista in Uruguay in 2000, then went back to China for a third time, where he played for Qingdao Etsong before retiring from football at the end of the season.

== International career ==
He made his debut for Uruguay in a friendly match against Brazil (1–0 win) on April 30, 1992, in the Estadio Centenario in Montevideo under coach Luis Alberto Cubilla. He went on to score the winner in that game.

== Coaching career ==
Paz now resides in Florida and runs a soccer academy.

== Honors ==
Individual

- MLS All-Star, 1998
