= Kevin East =

American soccer player and coach

Personal information
- Date of birth: March 29, 1971 (age 55)
- Place of birth: United States
- Height: 6 ft 2 in (1.88 m)
- Position: Goalkeeper

College career
| Years | Team | Apps | (Gls) |
| 1989–1992 | Kean Cougars | | |

Senior career*
| Years | Team | Apps | (Gls) |
| 1994–1995 | Jersey Dragons | | |
| 1996–1997 | Central Jersey Riptide | | |
| 1998 | New Jersey Stallions | | |
| 1998 | → MetroStars (loan) | 0 | (0) |
| 1999 | North Jersey Imperials | | |
| 1999 | → MetroStars (loan) | 0 | (0) |
| 2000–2001 | New Jersey Stallions | 7 | (0) |

Managerial career
- 1998–2006: New Jersey City Gothic Knights
- 2004: New Jersey City Gothic Knights (women)
- 2007–: Rutgers–Newark Scarlet Raiders
- * Club domestic league appearances and goals

Kevin East (born March 29, 1971) is an American professional soccer coach and former player who played as a goalkeeper. He is the head coach of the Rutgers–Newark Scarlet Raiders.

East spent six seasons in the USISL and two as a backup keeper with the MetroStars in Major League Soccer.

He is a member of the National Soccer Coaches Association of America National Rating Board and is a former president of the College Soccer Association of New Jersey.

== Early life and career ==
East graduated from Montgomery High School where he was an all-state soccer player. He then attended Kean University where he was a member of the men's soccer team from 1989 to 1992. In 1992, he and his teammates won the NCAA Division III national championship.

He holds the school record for single season and career saves as well as career shutouts. He graduated with a bachelor's degree in political science and criminal justice in 1993 and was inducted into the Kean University Hall of Fame in 2004.

== Playing career ==
In 1994, he signed with the Jersey Dragons in the USISL. He then played the 1995 season with the Dragons before being drafted by the Columbus Crew in the 3rd round (30th overall) of the 1996 MLS supplemental draft. He broke his wrist during the preseason and was released soon after.

On May 15, 1996, he signed a two-year contract with the Central Jersey Riptide of USISL.

In 1998, he began the season with the New Jersey Stallions before being sent on loan to the MetroStars of Major League Soccer when regular backup Tim Howard joined the U.S. under-20 national team in preparation for the 1999 FIFA World Youth Championship qualification. He shared time during the 1999 season with the MetroStars and the North Jersey Imperials.

In 2000 and 2001, he played a handful of games for the New Jersey Stallions.

== Coaching career ==
In 1993, East became an assistant coach at Kean University, a position he held through 1996. In 1998, he was hired as the men's soccer coach by New Jersey City University. Over the next nine seasons, he compiled a 123-66-11 record and was the 2005 New Jersey Athletic Conference Coach of the Year. In 2004, he coached the women's soccer team for a single season, compiling a 5-13-1 record.

In January 2007, he was hired by Rutgers University–Newark as the school's head soccer coach, a position he holds today. East led the men's soccer team to the program's first NJAC championship in 2017.

He is a member of the National Soccer Coaches Association of America National Rating Board. He is also a former president of the College Soccer Association of New Jersey.
