= Manny Catano =

American soccer player and coach

Personal information
- Full name: Manuel Catano
- Position: Midfielder

Youth career
- 1991: UMKC Kangaroos
- 1992–1994: Park College

Senior career*
Years	Team	Apps	(Gls)
1995	Des Moines Menace		
1996	Hawaii Tsunami		
1998	Atlanta Attack (indoor)		
1997–1998	Tallahassee Scorpions (indoor)		
- * Club domestic league appearances and goals

Manuel “Manny” Catano is an American retired soccer midfielder who played professionally in the USISL. He is a firefighter and coaches girls soccer.

== Career ==
Catano graduated from Blue Springs High School in Blue Springs, Missouri where he was an All State high school soccer player. In 1991, he played soccer at the University of Missouri–Kansas City. That season, he led the Kangaroos in goals and points. He then transferred to Park College where he finished his collegiate career. In 1995, he played for the Des Moines Menace in the USISL. In February 1996, the Columbus Crew selected Catano in the sixteenth round (151st overall) of the 1996 MLS Inaugural Player Draft. On March 26, 1996, the Crew waived him and he moved to the Hawaii Tsunami for the 1996 season. On August 16, 1997, Catano signed with the Tallahassee Scorpions of the Eastern Indoor Soccer League. That winter, he spent time with the Kansas City Attack of the National Professional Soccer League. He was back with the Scorpions in 1998.
