= Harut Karapetyan =

Armenian footballer

Personal information
- Full name: Harutyun Karapetyan
- Date of birth: 7 April 1972 (age 54)
- Place of birth: Yerevan, Armenian SSR, Soviet Union
- Height: 5 ft 9 in (1.75 m)
- Position: Forward

Senior career*
Years	Team	Apps	(Gls)
1993–1994	Los Angeles Salsa		
1996–1998	Los Angeles Galaxy	73	(18)
1998	San Jose Clash	5	(0)
1999	Tampa Bay Mutiny	2	(0)
2000	San Jose Earthquakes	24	(2)

International career
1997	Armenia	1	(0)
- * Club domestic league appearances and goals

Harutyun Karapetyan (born 7 April 1972) is an Armenian former professional footballer who played as a forward in Major League Soccer (MLS) for the Los Angeles Galaxy, the San Jose Clash, and the Tampa Bay Mutiny.

Karapetyan holds the record for the fastest hat-trick in MLS history, scoring one in five minutes in June 1998 while playing for the Galaxy in a game against FC Dallas (originally the Dallas Burn); the Galaxy eventually won the match 8–1.

== Career ==
Karapetyan played for the Los Angeles Salsa in the American Professional Soccer League in 1993 and 1994. In February 1996, the Galaxy selected him in the 7th round (74th overall) in the 1996 MLS Inaugural Player Draft. A resident of Van Nuys, he was so unknown that he was inadvertently omitted from the L.A. Times's 7 February 1996 account of the draft's opening rounds. On 26 May 1996, Karapetyan scored his first two goals for the Galaxy, in a 3–2 victory over the Columbus Crew. On 7 August 1998, the Galaxy traded him to the Clash in exchange for Lawrence Lozzano. The Clash waived Karapetyan on 2 November 1998. In May 2000, he returned to MLS when he signed with the San Jose Earthquakes. After retiring in 2000 due to injuries and coaching decisions, Karapetyan became the general sales manager at Honda of Hollywood.
