= Brian Bliss =

American soccer player (born 1965)

Personal information
- Full name: Brian Boyer Bliss
- Date of birth: September 28, 1965 (age 61)
- Place of birth: Webster, New York, U.S.
- Height: 5 ft 8 in (1.73 m)
- Position: Defender

Team information
- Current team: Sporting Kansas City (Director of Player Personnel)

College career
Years	Team	Apps	(Gls)
1983–1986	Southern Connecticut Owls		

Senior career*
Years	Team	Apps	(Gls)
1987–1988	Cleveland Force	51	(4)
1989	Albany Capitals	5	(0)
1990	Boston Bolts	?	(?)
1990–1991	Energie Cottbus	13	(1)
1991	Chemnitzer FC	12	(0)
1992–1996	FC Carl Zeiss Jena	83	(1)
1996–1997	Columbus Crew	31	(2)
1997	MetroStars	16	(0)
1998	Kansas City Wizards	3	(0)
1999	Connecticut Wolves	22	(0)
Total		236	(8)

International career
1984–1995	United States	33	(2)

Managerial career
- 1999: Connecticut Wolves
- 2000–2006: Kansas City Wizards (assistant)
- 2006: Kansas City Wizards (interim)
- 2012–2013: United States U20 (assistant)
- 2013: Columbus Crew (interim)
- 2015: Chicago Fire (interim)
- * Club domestic league appearances and goals

Brian Boyer Bliss (born September 28, 1965) is an American retired soccer defender and front office executive. He also serves as an assistant coach for the United States U-20 national team.

Bliss played professionally in Europe and the United States, including the original Major Indoor Soccer League, American Soccer League, and American Professional Soccer League. He earned forty-four caps, scoring two goals, with the U.S. national soccer team and was part of 1990 FIFA World Cup squad.

== Playing career ==
=== Early career ===
Bliss attended Webster Schroeder High School in Webster, New York. After high school, he attended Southern Connecticut State University from 1983 to 1986. On December 2, 1984, Bliss earned his first cap in a 2–2 tie with Ecuador. He would not play again until 1987 when he would play two of the three U.S. games. That year, the Cleveland Force of the Major Indoor Soccer League drafted Bliss with the top pick. He would play a single season with the Force in 1987–1988. In 1988, he played in the Summer Olympics. In 1989, Bliss played five games with the Albany Capitals of the American Soccer League. However, by that time he was a regular with the national team, playing nearly every game in the team's qualification campaign for the 1990 FIFA World Cup. He played only one of the team's three games in that cup, as a substitute in the loss to Austria. In 1990, he was on the roster of the Boston Bolts of the American Professional Soccer League.

=== European career ===
After the World Cup, Bliss went to Germany to play with Energie Cottbus of the 1990–91 NOFV-Oberliga. He later went on to play for Chemnitzer FC and then FC Carl Zeiss Jena. Bliss was one of the last cuts from the final 1994 FIFA World Cup roster when he tore cartilage in his knee.

=== Major League Soccer ===
As Major League Soccer prepared for its first season, it began a process of equitably distributing known players to each of the league's teams. As part of this process, Bliss was allocated to the Columbus Crew. He played a season and a half for Columbus, being traded 12 games into the 1997 season to the MetroStars for A.J. Wood. Bliss finished the 1997 season with the MetroStars, but was traded by the team to the Kansas City Wizards for a first round college draft pick during the 1998 off-season. He played only three games of the 1998 season. In 1999, he finished his career with the Connecticut Wolves.

== Coaching career ==
After retirement, he went on to coach the Connecticut Wolves of the A-League in 1999. The next year, Gansler selected him again, this time to be the assistant coach for the Wizards. On July 19, 2006, Gansler stepped down as head coach, allowing Bliss to become interim head coach for Kansas City. In March 2007, Curt Onalfo replaced Bliss as the Wizards head coach, and Bliss joined Kansas Youth Soccer as State Director of Coaching. He also coached the JV squad at Olathe Northwest Highschool where he coached Andy Cockrum who went on to play for La Masia, which is FC Barcelona's academy team.

Bliss served as the technical director of the Columbus Crew for six seasons, helping the Crew earn two Supporters' Shield and one MLS Cup. He served as interim head coach for part of the 2013 season following the dismissal of Robert Warzycha, but he was not retained as head coach and departed for Chicago following the hiring of Gregg Berhalter.

On September 20, 2015, Bliss was named interim coach of the Chicago Fire, while retaining his technical director duties at the club.

He joined Sporting Kansas City as Director of Player Personnel in January 2016.

== Career statistics ==
#	Date	Venue	Opponent	Goals	Result	Competition
1	December 2, 1984	Miami, Florida	Ecuador	-	2-2	Friendly
2	June 8, 1987	Seoul, South Korea	Egypt	-	1-3	Friendly
3	June 16, 1987	Chongju, South Korea	Thailand	-	1-0	Friendly
4	June 12, 1988	Fort Worth, Texas	Ecuador	-	0–0	Friendly
5	July 13, 1988	New Britain, Connecticut	Poland	-	0–2	Friendly
6	July 24, 1988	Kingston, Jamaica	Jamaica	-	0-0	1990 World Cup Qualifying
7	August 13, 1988	St. Louis, Missouri	Jamaica	1	5–1	1990 World Cup Qualifying
8	April 16, 1989	San Jose, Costa Rica	Costa Rica	-	0–1	1990 World Cup Qualifying
9	April 30, 1989	St. Louis, Missouri	Costa Rica	-	1–0	1990 World Cup Qualifying
10	June 4, 1989	East Rutherford, New Jersey	Peru	1	3-0	Friendly
11	June 17, 1989	New Britain, Connecticut	Guatemala	-	2-1	1990 World Cup Qualifying
12	June 24, 1989	Miami, Florida	Colombia	-	0–1	Friendly
13	August 13, 1989	Los Angeles, California	South Korea	-	1-2	Friendly
14	September 17, 1989	Tegucigalpa, Honduras	El Salvador	-	1–0	1990 World Cup Qualifying
15	October 8, 1989	Guatemala City, Guatemala	Guatemala	-	0–0	1990 World Cup Qualifying
16	November 5, 1989	St. Louis, Missouri	El Salvador	-	0–0	1990 World Cup Qualifying
17	November 14, 1989	Cocoa Beach, Florida	Bermuda	-	2-1	Friendly
18	November 19, 1989	Port of Spain, Trinidad	Trinidad and Tobago	-	1-0	1990 World Cup Qualifying
19	March 30, 1990	Budapest, Hungary	Hungary	-	0-2	Friendly
20	April 22, 1990	Miami, Florida	Colombia	-	0-1	Friendly
21	May 5, 1990	Piscataway, New Jersey	Malta	-	1-0	Friendly
22	May 30, 1990	Eschen, Liechtenstein	Liechtenstein	-	4–1	Friendly
23	June 19, 1990	Florence, Italy	Austria	-	1–2	1990 FIFA World Cup
24	July 28, 1990	Milwaukee, Wisconsin	East Germany	-	1–2	Friendly
25	September 15, 1990	High Point, North Carolina	Trinidad and Tobago	-	3–0	Friendly
26	November 18, 1990	Port of Spain, Trinidad	Trinidad and Tobago	-	0–0	Friendly
27	November 21, 1990	Port of Spain, Trinidad	Soviet Union	-	0-0	Friendly
28	December 18, 1993	Palo Alto, California	Germany	-	0–3	Friendly
29	May 25, 1994	Piscataway, New Jersey	Saudi Arabia	-	0–0	Friendly
30	June 11, 1995	Foxborough, Massachusetts	Nigeria	-	3-2	Friendly
31	June 25, 1995	Piscataway, New Jersey	Colombia	-	0-0	Friendly
