= Brandon Ward (soccer) =

American soccer player (born 1972)

Brandon Ward (Soccer player)
Personal information
- Date of birth: December 11, 1972 (age 53)
- Place of birth: Westerville, Ohio, United States
- Height: 5 ft 9 in (1.75 m)
- Position: Midfielder

Youth career
- 1991–1994: Indiana University

Senior career*
Years	Team	Apps	(Gls)
1996	Columbus Crew	6	(0)
1996–1998	St. Louis Ambush (indoor)	76	(33)
1998	Chicago Stingers		
- * Club domestic league appearances and goals

Brandon Ward (born December 11, 1972) and is a retired U.S. soccer midfielder who played one season in Major League Soccer as well as the USISL and National Professional Soccer League.

Ward attended the Indiana University, playing on the men's soccer team from 1991 to 1994. In his senior season, the Hoosiers went to the NCAA Men's Soccer Championship only to lose to the Virginia Cavaliers. Various sources place Ward with three different teams during 1995, the Hampton Roads Mariners, Richmond Kickers and Indiana Blast. On February 7, 1996, the Columbus Crew selected Ward in the sixth round (fifty-first overall) of the 1996 MLS Inaugural Player Draft. He played six games for the Crew before being released. He then joined the St. Louis Ambush in the National Professional Soccer League. He spent two seasons with the Ambush before being again being drafted by the Crew, this time in the first round of the 1998 MLS Supplemental Draft. The Crew released him on April 1, 1998, before Ward played a game. He then signed with the Chicago Stingers of the USISL.
