= Pat Harrington (soccer) =

Canadian soccer player (born 1965)

Personal information
- Full name: Patrick Harrington
- Date of birth: April 17, 1965 (age 61)
- Place of birth: Montreal, Quebec, Canada
- Height: 1.90 m (6 ft 3 in)
- Position: Goalkeeper

Senior career*
Years	Team	Apps	(Gls)
1985–1986	Charlton Athletic	0	(0)
1986–1990	Toronto Blizzard	52	(0)
1991–1992	Montreal Supra	28	(0)
1993–1995	Montreal Impact	43	(0)
1994–1997	Buffalo Blizzard (indoor)	69	(1)
1996	Kansas City Wizards	8	(0)
1996	Columbus Crew	4	(0)
1997	Detroit Safari (indoor)		
1999–2000	Sacramento Knights (indoor)	42	(0)

International career
1992	Canada	1	(0)
- * Club domestic league appearances and goals

Pat Harrington (born April 17, 1965) is a Canadian former professional soccer player who played as a goalkeeper. He made one appearance for the Canada national team.

== Club career ==
In December 1983, the Toronto Blizzard selected Harrington in the first round (second overall) of the 1983 North American Soccer League draft. He moved to English side Charlton Athletic before signing with the Toronto Blizzard in 1986. In his debut season with Toronto he played in the National Soccer League where he assisted in securing the NSL Canadian Championship. The following season he continued playing with the Blizzard in the Canadian Soccer League. He then played for Montreal outfits Supra and Impact. In 1994, he joined the Buffalo Blizzard of the National Professional Soccer League. He scored in the team's second game of the season, but played only eleven games that year due to injury. During the 1996-1997 NPSL season, Harrington had the league's lowest goals against average. On March 4, 1996, the Kansas City Wiz selected Harrington in the first round (fifth overall) of the 1996 MLS Supplemental Draft. He began the season with Kansas City, but moved to the Columbus Crew. The Crew released him at the end of the season. On April 24, 1997, the Detroit Safari selected Harrington in the first round (fifth overall) of the Continental Indoor Soccer League draft. In 1999 and 2000, he played for the Sacramento Knights in the World Indoor Soccer League.

== International career ==
Harrington made his senior debut for Canada in a September 1992 friendly match against the United States, coming on as a second-half substitute for Paul Dolan. It proved to be his only international appearance.

He did however also play at the inaugural 1989 FIFA Futsal World Championship. .
