= Pete Marino =

American soccer forward (born 1973)

Personal information
- Full name: Peter Marino
- Date of birth: April 23, 1973 (age 53)
- Place of birth: Pompano Beach, Florida, United States
- Height: 5 ft 8 in (1.73 m)
- Position: Forward

College career
Years	Team	Apps	(Gls)
- Brevard Community College

Senior career*
Years	Team	Apps	(Gls)
- SC Brouck
	Bayer Leverkusen	0	(0)
1996–1997	Columbus Crew	57	(19)
1998	Kansas City Wizards	11	(1)
1998	→ MLS Pro 40 (loan)	4	(4)
1999	Tampa Bay Mutiny	15	(1)
1999	→ Richmond Kickers (loan)	1	(0)
2000	D.C. United	15	(5)
2001	Miami Fusion	2	(0)
2003–2006	Cocoa Expos	34	(41)
2007–	Treasure Coast Galleons	25	(21)
- * Club domestic league appearances and goals

Pete Marino (born April 23, 1973) is an American soccer forward currently playing for the Treasure Coast Galleons in the FESL. Marino spent six seasons in Major League Soccer and one USL Premier Development League.

Marina attended Brevard Community College before moving to Germany to pursue a professional career. He spent two and a half years playing in the lower division with a team identified as SC Brouck. He then moved to Bayer Leverkusen, playing for its Regionalliga team. Marino was picked by the Columbus Crew in the 12th round of the 1996 Inaugural Draft, overall, and emerged as the 13th-highest scorer in the first season of MLS. In 1997, Marino led the Crew in scoring, but saw himself reduced to a substitute after being traded to the Kansas City Wizards for Frank Klopas) in 1998. His luck was no better the next year at the Tampa Bay Mutiny, as he again scored only one goal and was waived shortly thereafter. On May 27, 2000, D.C. United picked up Marino, who surged back to score 5 goals that season, finding play as a "super-sub". Marino ended up at the Miami Fusion for the 2001 season, scoring a goal and an assist before suffering a knee injury which forced him to sit out for the next two years, which ultimately ended his career with the Fusion and MLS after the team was contracted at the season's end.

Though his nickname came to refer to his clever, goal-poaching style of play, and was reinforced by a notable handball goal in early MLS history, Marino was first dubbed "Sneaky" by a Crew teammate who found him slippery and hard to mark in practice games.

In 2007, Marino became a founder of, and player with, the Treasure Coast Galleons of the newly formed Florida Elite Soccer League (FESL). In 2007, Marino was named the league MVP as the Galleons won the league title. In 2008, he finished fifth in league scoring and first in assists with 8 assists in 11 games.
