= Hamisi Amani-Dove =

American soccer player

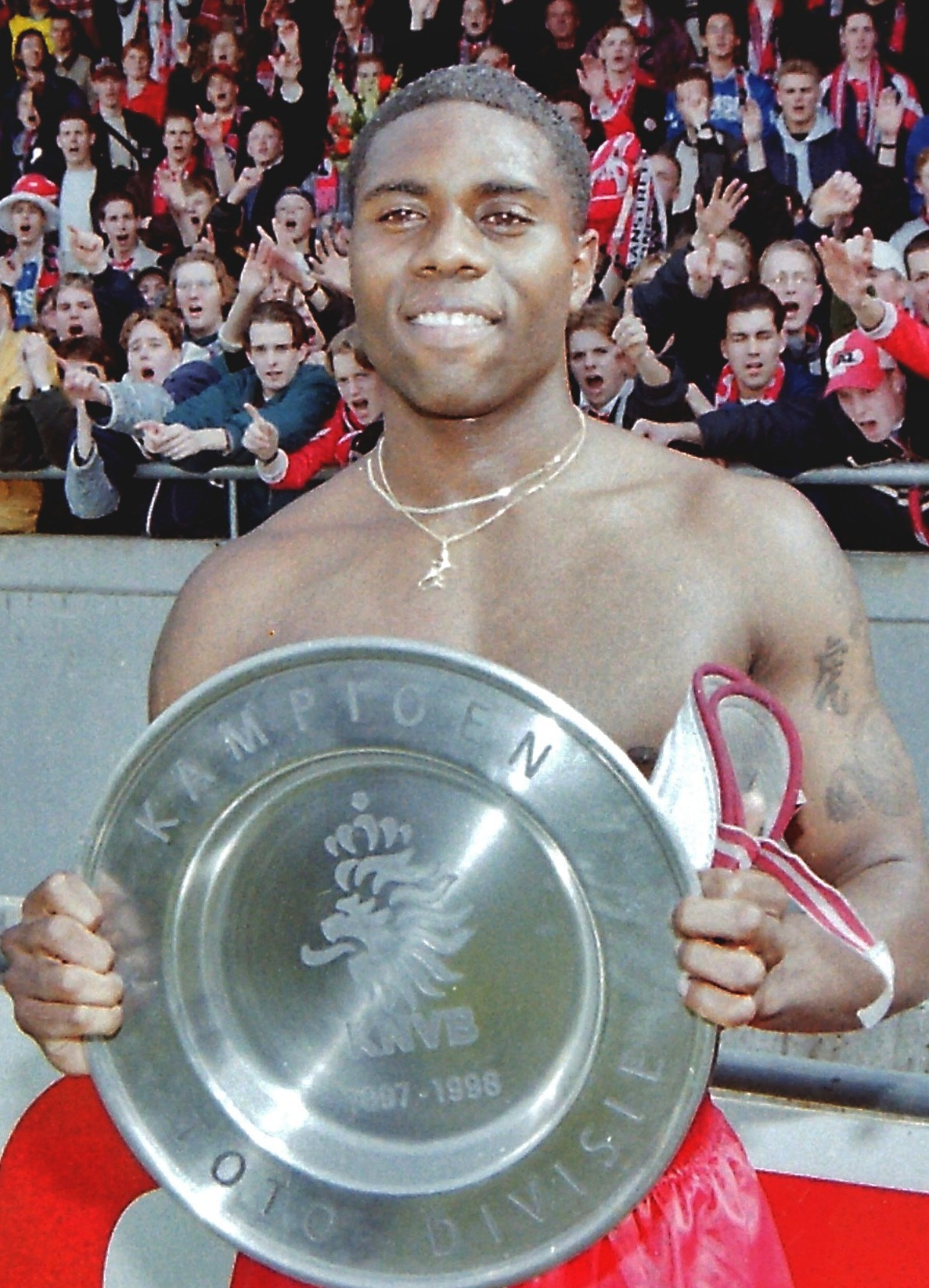
- Hamisi Amani-Dove after having won the Dutch Eerste Divisie with AZ in 1998

Personal information
- Full name: Hamisi Amani-Dove
- Date of birth: March 28, 1974 (age 52)
- Place of birth: New York City, United States
- Height: 5 ft 11 in (1.80 m)
- Position: Striker

Youth career
- 1995: Rutgers University

Senior career*
Years	Team	Apps	(Gls)
1996–1998	AZ	20	(2)
1998–1999	BSV Bad Bleiberg		(32)
2000–2001	Tzafririm Holon	20	(4)
2001–2002	Dallas Burn	6	(0)
2002	Rochester Raging Rhinos	16	(3)
2003–2005	Virginia Beach Mariners	82	(9)

International career
- US U-20
- * Club domestic league appearances and goals

Hamisi Amani-Dove (born March 28, 1974) is an American retired soccer player.

== Youth ==
A graduate of Rutgers University, sixth all-time scoring leader at the university with thirty-two goals in seventy-two games, he was drafted by the MetroStars of Major League Soccer after college. He turned down the offer, opting to sign with AZ in the Dutch Eerste Divisie. In 1996, he was also selected for the U.S. Olympic Team for the Atlanta Olympics. Amani-Dove scored the equalizer in the away match against ADO Den Haag in 1998, which secured promotion for the club.

== Professional ==
After the Netherlands, Amani-Dove played with Bad Bleiberg and was a featured player scoring 32 goals in two seasons with the club. In 1999 the player made a move to Tzafririm Holon in the Israeli first division where Amani-Dove again showed his scoring touch with nineteen goals in his two seasons with the club. In 2001 the Dallas Burn of Major League Soccer acquired Amani-Dove. In 2002 looking to transition from professional soccer to the business world, Amani-Dove moved to the USL and played with the Rochester Rhinos in 2002 and the Virginia Beach Mariners from 2003 to 2005., which gave him more time to pursue off-of-the-field opportunities.

== Post-soccer employment ==
Amani-Dove retired in 2005 and is now a businessman in the Washington, D.C. metro area. Amani-Dove has guest speaking engagements across the country focused on the importance of recreational programs and sports for youth. He also provides guest technical training for many youth clubs in Maryland and Virginia.
