= Columbus Xoggz =

American soccer team in Columbus, Ohio

- Founded: 1993
- Dissolved: February 1997
- Ground: Dublin Coffman High School
- Owner: Kinsley Nyce
- General manager: Brian Sells
- League: USISL Select League

The Columbus Xoggz (known as the Ohio Xoggz in their final season) were an American soccer team that played in Columbus, Ohio. The team played their games at Dublin Coffman High School.

== History ==
The Xoggz were founded ahead of the 1994 United States Interregional Soccer League (USISL) season by Kinsley Nyce, a lawyer and businessman who had previously been involved with the North American Soccer League and Major Indoor Soccer League. The club hired Chris Brown, who had previously coached at Wittenburg University, as its first head coach. According to Nyce, the club operated with a $250,000 budget for the first season, and needed to average 3,000 attendees per match to break even.

The Xoggz played their first home match on April 24, 1994, at Xoggz R Nyce Field at Dublin High School. 4,722 attendees came out for the 3–1 win over the Des Moines Menace. On June 9, 1994, the Xoggz fired Chris Brown due to a "personality conflict", replacing him with Ukrainian coach Yakov Roytman. The Xoggz finished the 1994 USISL regular season with a 12–7 record, putting them in third place in the midwest division. They suffered a 1–0 overtime loss to the Milwaukee Rampage in the first round of the USISL playoffs to end their season.

For the 1995 season, the USISL split into the professional USISL Pro League season and the amateur Premier Development League; the Xoggz joined the USISL Pro League. In early June, Yakov Roytman resigned as coach; Nyce said Roytman was unhappy with his diminishing responsibilities with the team. Player/assistant coach Nick Roberts took over as head coach. The Xoggz finished the regular season with a 17–3 record. In the first round of the USISL Pro League playoffs, the Xoggz hosted the Louisville Thoroughbreds. Regulation time ended in a 1–1 draw, and the match was suspended due to darkness; the league office ultimately awarded the win to the Xoggz due to their two shutout victories over Louisville in the regular season. The Xoggz' second round match against the Milwaukee Rampage was played in two parts. In the first part on August 11, the Xoggz hosted Milwaukee and played to a 1–1 tie in regulation before losing 2–0 in a penalty shootout. In the second part on August 13, the Xoggz lost 1–0 in regulation at Milwaukee, ending their playoffs run.

The team averaged over 3,000 attendees per game in its first two seasons. In 1996, however, came the arrival of the Columbus Crew, a team in newly founded Major League Soccer. Initially, the Xoggz were optimistic about surviving alongside the Crew, claiming in April 1996 that they had retained 90% of their sponsors and gained several others. However, attendance fell to 1,500–2,000 for the 1996 season, and in February 1997, the Xoggz ceased operations.

== Branding ==
The name "Xoggz" was chosen as a mysterious phrase with no known meaning; Nyce has said that the name was deliberately convoluted to create a cult following and drive merchandise sales. The club employed several novel marketing schemes. Instead of an electronic scoreboard, they had a "graffiti scoreboard", a plywood frame on which the score would be spray-painted by a fan after each goal.

== Stadium ==
In the 1994 season, the Xoggz played at Xoggz R Nyce Field at Dublin High School in Dublin, Ohio, a suburb northwest of Columbus. In 1995, they played at Sports Ohio, another facility in Dublin. The Xoggz returned to Dublin High School for the 1996 season.

== Year-by-year ==
Year	Division	League	Reg. season	Playoffs	Open Cup
1994	3	USISL	3rd, Midwest	Divisional Semifinals	Did not enter
1995	3	USISL Pro League	2nd, Midwest West	Divisional Semifinals	Did not qualify
1996	2	USISL Select League	4th, Central	Did not qualify	Did not qualify
