= 1996 MLS Inaugural Allocations =

The Major League Soccer Inaugural Allocations were signed by the league beginning with Tab Ramos on January 5, 1995. Major League Soccer then distributed to the ten initial teams prior to the beginning of the inaugural 1996 season. Each team was allocated four marquee players prior to the February 1996 MLS Inaugural Player Draft.

== Colorado Rapids ==
- (United States) Marcelo Balboa
- (South Africa) Shaun Bartlett
- (United States) Dominic Kinnear
- (United States) Roy Wegerle

== Columbus Crew ==
- (United States) Brian Bliss
- (South Africa) Doctor Khumalo
- (United States) Brian Maisonneuve
- (Uruguay) Adrián Paz

== Dallas Burn ==
- (Colombia) Leonel Álvarez
- (Uruguay) Washington Rodríguez
- (Mexico) Hugo Sánchez
- (United States) Mark Santel

== D.C. United ==
- (United States) Jeff Agoos
- (Bolivia) Marco Etcheverry
- (United States) John Harkes
- (Bolivia) Juan Berthy Suárez

== Kansas City Wiz ==
- (United States) Frank Klopas
- (United States) Preki
- (United States) Mike Sorber
- (Zimbabwe) Vitalis Takawira

== Los Angeles Galaxy ==
- (United States) Dan Calichman
- (Mexico) Jorge Campos
- (El Salvador) Mauricio Cienfuegos
- (Ecuador) Eduardo Hurtado

== NY/NJ MetroStars ==
- (Italy) Roberto Donadoni
- (United States) Tony Meola
- (United States) Tab Ramos
- (United States) Damian Silvera

== New England Revolution ==
- (United States) Mike Burns
- (Italy) Giuseppe Galderisi
- (United States) Alexi Lalas
- (United States) Jim St. Andre

== San Jose Clash ==
- (United States) John Doyle
- (Nigeria) Michael Emenalo
- (Nigeria) Ben Iroha
- (United States) Eric Wynalda

== Tampa Bay Mutiny ==
- (United States) Cle Kooiman
- (United States) Roy Lassiter
- (Colombia) Carlos Valderrama
- (United States) Martín Vásquez
