= Connecticut Wolves =

American soccer club

- Full name: Connecticut Wolves
- Founded: 1993
- Dissolved: 2004
- Stadium: Veterans Stadium
- Capacity: 5,200
- League: United States Interregional Soccer League; USL First Division

The Connecticut Wolves were an American soccer club that was founded by the Clifton Onolfo, the Onolfo Family, and several investors including Tony DiCicco. The Club's inaugural match was attended by 5,200 plus fans and competed in the United Soccer Leagues from 1993 to 2004. Based in New Britain, Connecticut, and playing in Veteran's Stadium, the club started in the D-3 Pro League before moving to the A-League in 1997. The Connecticut Wolves were sold to the City of New Britain in 1997. The Club had an extensive history of solid success for soccer and was sold to the City because there were two bidding inquires from New London Foxwoods area and another from Stamford CT. New Britain lobbied the State to win approval to buy the Club for a budget not to exceed $1.9 million for debts, player contracts, company stock and operations.

== History ==
In 1992 prior to MLS and NASL the USISL had 19 Teams across the South and Southeast. The Onolfo Family and Investors acquired the rights for USISL Connecticut and announced the Connecticut Wolves in 1993. The USISL grew steadily through the next five years adding teams in the North East including the Long Island Roughriders, NY Fever, Boston Breakers, Rochester Rhinos, Richmond Kickers, Delaware Wizards. 1996 the A League merged with the support of Umbro into the USL now 116 Teams Strong in ProAm, D3 and A League Divisions. The Club ownership was transferred the City oh New Britain, in lieu of moving to Stamford Connecticut. The Wolves enjoyed three seasons over 10 years where they reached the Quarterfinals of USL League playoffs. at its peak the Jr Wolves Academy hosted over 19 team affiliates coached by Wolves Players and Alumni, winning 11 State Championships. In 2002, USL and A League merged USL and D3, the Wolves played there for one year before the City of New Britain folded the team. Former players for the Wolves include Bo Oshoniyi of Southern Connecticut State University, David Kelly, currently coach at Central Connecticut State University, former Wimbledon F.C. player Carlton Fairweather, and former Moroccan international goalkeeper Chuck Martini (also known as Chuck Moussadik). Martini subsequently played for at least 12 football clubs in England, mostly non-league, the most recent being Worthing FC of the Ryman Premier League. David Williamson ex Hong Kong International and former Motherwell, Cambridge United league and cup winner with Bohemians of Dublin and cup winner with Hibernians of Malta.

Arguably the 3 biggest non A League victories for the Club in one season were the defeat of the MLS NE Revolution on Alexi Lalas night on a late goal by James Proctor assisted by Tony Kasulinous. They then defeated Galatasary of Turkey, 2-1 on unassisted goals by Mark Nihl and Sanjay Reed. Then the Wolves defeated Major League Soccer's Tampa Bay Mutiny 3–2 in the Lamar Hunt U.S. Open Cup to advance to the third round of the tournament. Tony Kasulinous registered a goal and an assist while Rob McEchon scored on a set piece and Jorge Sanchez scored from Kasulinous.

== Year-by-year ==
Year	Division	League	Reg. season	Playoffs	Open Cup	Avg. attendance
1993	N/A	USISL	6th, Atlantic	Did not qualify	Did not enter	N/A
1994	3	USISL	8th, Northeast	Did not qualify	Did not enter	N/A
1995	3	USISL Pro League	6th, Capital	Did not qualify	1st Round	N/A
1994/95	N/A	USISL Indoor	played one game	Did not qualify	N/A	N/A
1996	3	USISL Select League	3rd, North Atlantic	1st Round	Did not qualify	1,631
1997	2	USISL A-League	5th, Northeast	Did not qualify	Did not qualify	2,488
1998	2	USISL A-League	7th, Northeast	Did not qualify	Did not qualify	2,452
1999	2	USL A-League	8th, Northeast	Did not qualify	Did not qualify	1,227
2000	2	USL A-League	6th, Northeast	Did not qualify	Did not qualify	1,325
2001	2	USL A-League	5th, Northern	Did not qualify	3rd Round	1,986
2002	3	USL D3-Pro League	2nd, Northern	Semifinals	Did not qualify	2,151

== Head coaches ==
- (Poland) Leszek Wrona (1993–1995)
- Steven Stokoe (1995–1996)
- (United States) Brian Bliss (1999)
- (United States) Dan Gaspar (2000–2002)

Manager of Football & President Clifton Onolfo. (1993–1997)

General Manager Tom Jackson. (1993–2000)
