= Jacksonville Cyclones =

- Full name: Jacksonville Cyclones
- Nickname: Cyclones
- Founded: 1995 (as Tampa Bay Cyclones)
- Dissolved: 1999
- Stadium: Mandarin High School Football Field (1997-98); Wolfson Park (1999)
- Manager: Dennis Viollet
- League: A-League
| Home colors | Away colors |

The Jacksonville Cyclones were a professional soccer team based in Jacksonville, Florida. They played in the A-League from 1997 to 1999. The team originated as the Tampa Bay Cyclones, who played in Tampa, Florida from 1995 to 1996 before moving to Jacksonville. The team folded in 1999 shortly after the death of their manager Dennis Viollet, the former Manchester United and England striker.

== Year-by-year ==
| Year | Division | League | Reg. season | Playoffs | Open Cup |
|---|---|---|---|---|---|
| 1995 | 3 | USISL Pro League | 1st, Southeast | Semifinals | 1st Round |
| 1996 | 3 | USISL Select League | 4th, South Atlantic | Did not qualify | Did not qualify |
| 1997 | 2 | USISL A-League | 6th, Atlantic | Did not qualify | Did not qualify |
| 1998 | 2 | USISL A-League | 5th, Atlantic | Did not qualify | Did not qualify |
| 1999 | 2 | USL A-League | 4th, Atlantic | Did not qualify | 3rd Round |
