= 1996 D.C. United season =

D.C. United
1996 season
- General manager: Dave Kasper
- Head coach: Bruce Arena
- Stadium: RFK Stadium
- MLS: 3rd
- MLS Cup: Champions
- U.S. Open Cup: Champions
- Top goalscorer: League: Raúl Díaz Arce (23); All: Raúl Díaz Arce (24)
- Highest home attendance: 32,864 vs New England (April 27, 1996)
- Average home league attendance: 15,585
Home colors	Away colors

The 1996 D.C. United season was the teams debutant season in Major League Soccer (MLS), and 1996 was the inaugural year of play in MLS competition. United would become the first club to win the MLS Cup this year.

This was the first year since 1981 that a pro soccer team from the Washington metropolitan area played in the top tier of the American soccer pyramid.

== Background ==
Prior to Major League Soccer's inaugural season, it had been six years since the Washington Metropolitan Area had a professional soccer club play within the region. The last team, was the late 1980s/early 1990s version of the Washington Diplomats. The Diplomats, played in the American Soccer League, which at the time was, by de facto, the top division of soccer in the United States although it was not sanctioned by U.S. Soccer or FIFA as a top tier soccer league. With the installation of the D.C. United franchise, it was the first time since the 1981 that a top division pro soccer club played in the region.

The foundation of the team came on June 15, 1994, when Major League Soccer selected Washington, D.C. out of twenty-two applicants to host one of the first seven teams, with three more added before the league's launch.

== Club name ==
Once an MLS franchise was awarded to Washington, the new club management sought a name for the club. Attempting to allude to the American sporting culture, original suppositions included the area's name followed by a mascot for the club. Some ideas included the "Spies", "Americans" and "Eagles". Eventually, the idea of simply naming the team "D.C. United" was decided upon as the club name. The moniker "United" alluded to European club names such as Leeds and Manchester United, as well as reflecting on being based in capital of the United States.

== MLS regular season ==
The team got off to a slow start, losing its first three games in April, but improved during the season, including a four-match winning streak in August, and qualified for the playoffs.

== MLS Playoffs ==
The final month of D.C. United's inaugural season saw the club compete in the first ever MLS Cup Playoffs, eventually being crowned the MLS Cup champions. Ten days later, United earned the double by winning the 1996 U.S. Open Cup, the United States' domestic knockout cup competition. Such a feat would not be accomplished again until the Chicago Fire did so in 1998. To date, only four other MLS sides have ever achieved any sort of "double", being regular season, playoffs, or cup competition.

Playoff play continued into October with game three of the conference semifinal series, with kickoff on October 2. United, tied with the New York/New Jersey MetroStars were level 1–1 in the series. Played in front of a crowd of 20,423, United would emerge victorious in the match and in the series winning the match and series by a 2–1 scoreline. In game three, Steve Rammel opened the scoring in the 67th minute, giving United a crucial 1–0 victory. Inside 20 minutes later, the MetroStars leveled things up off an 86th-minute strike from NY/NJ's Antony de Ávila. The match, looking destined for sudden death extra time was abruptly halted when a penalty was called against NY/NJ in the box. The call resulted with United's Raúl Díaz Arce notching the eventual match winner in the 89th minute of play. The win booked United into the 1996 MLS Eastern Conference Finals.

D.C. United took on the Supporters' Shield winners, Tampa Bay Mutiny on October 10 to open up the Eastern Conference Finals. The first match of the three-game series was held at RFK Stadium, where United posted a 4–1 victory. The score was United's largest margin of victory throughout the playoffs. The match saw Díaz Arce notch a hat trick, making him the first player in MLS Cup Playoffs history to score a hat trick in a playoff match. Díaz Arce scored in the 38th minute to give United the go-ahead lead, only for Tampa Bay's Roy Lassiter to equalize in the 42nd minute. United's Steve Rammel score what would eventually be the match-winning goal in the 52nd minute to give United a 2–1 lead over the Mutiny. Díaz Arce would score insurance goals for United in a three-minute span, scoring in the 58th and 60th minutes of play.

Held two days later, game two of the conference finals took place at Houlihan's Stadium near Tampa, Florida. With a crowd of 9,339 on hand, Tampa Bay took a 1–0 lead against D.C. inside 15 minutes, thanks to a strike from Steve Ralston. Ralston's goal proved to be the difference between the two sides for the remainder of the first half. However, four minutes into the second half of play, United's Richie Williams netted the equalizer. Díaz Arce would, once again, provide last minute heroics scoring in the 82nd minute to give United the 2–1 lead, and to book themselves in the inaugural MLS Cup championship.

== Match results ==
=== Major League Soccer ===
==== Regular season ====
April 6, 1996 Matchday 1	San Jose Clash	1–0	D.C. United	San Jose, California
	Emenalo (yellow card) 44'; Wynalda 88'	Report	Diaz Arce (yellow card) 5'; Gori (yellow card) 44'; Harkes (yellow card) 72'; Fazlagic (yellow card) 87'	Stadium: Spartan Stadium; Attendance: 31,683; Referee: Esse Baharmast

April 13, 1996 Matchday 2	Columbus Crew	4–0	D.C. United	Columbus, Ohio
	Lee 18' (o.g.); McBride 29', 86'; Clark (yellow card) 39'; Marino 48'; Oshoniyi (yellow card) 79'	Report	Williams (yellow card) 19'; Lee (yellow card) 33'; Etcheverry (yellow card) 66'	Stadium: Crew Stadium; Attendance: 25,266; Referee: Raul Dominguez

April 20, 1996 Matchday 3	D.C. United	1–2	Los Angeles Galaxy	Washington, D.C.
	Diaz Arce 7'	Report	Cienfuegos 21' (pen.), (yellow card) 89'; Calichman (yellow card) 37'; Salcedo 72'; Vasquez (yellow card) 77'	Stadium: RFK Stadium; Attendance: 35,032; Referee: Paul Tamberino

April 27, 1996 Matchday 4	New England Revolution	1–1 (3–2 SO)	D.C. United	Foxborough, Massachusetts
	DeBrito (yellow card) 26'; Aunger 78' (pen.)	Report	Harkes (yellow card) 24'; Diaz Arce 69'	Stadium: Foxboro Stadium; Attendance: 32,864; Referee: Esse Baharmast
	Shootout
	Welton (penalty scored); Paul Keegan (penalty missed); Ukrop (penalty missed); Woodring (penalty missed); Aunger (penalty scored); Sawatzky (penalty scored)		(penalty missed) Crawley; (penalty missed) Harkes; (penalty scored) Diaz Arce; (penalty scored) Kelderman; (penalty missed) Peay; (penalty missed) Pope

May 1, 1996 Matchday 5	D.C. United	3–1	Dallas Burn	Washington, D.C.
	Diaz Arce 15' (pen.); Rammel (yellow card) 39', (goal) 64'; Agoos (yellow card) 52'; Etcheverry 53'	Report	Puskarich (yellow card) 15'; Lozzano (yellow card) 24'; Rodriguez (yellow card) 31', (goal) 43' (pen.); Santel (yellow card) 53'; Alvarez (yellow card) 62'	Stadium: RFK Stadium; Attendance: 11,253; Referee: Byungil Noh

May 5, 1996 Matchday 6	Los Angeles Galaxy	3–1	D.C. United	Pasadena, California
	Vasquez 42'; Hurtado 53'; Cienfuegos (yellow card) 54'; Salcedo 71'; Campos (yellow card) 88'	Report	Peay (yellow card) 13'; Diaz Arce (yellow card) 16'; Rammel 28'; Crawley (yellow card) 90'; Etcheverry (yellow card) 90'	Stadium: Rose Bowl; Attendance: 20,471; Referee: Arturo Angeles

May 12, 1996 Matchday 7	D.C. United	1–1 (1–2 SO)	NY/NJ MetroStars	Washington, D.C.
	Harkes 11'; Huwiler (yellow card) 24'; Peay (yellow card) 36'	Report	Restrepo (yellow card) 21'; Ramos (yellow card) 36' (yellow-red card) 77'; Knowles (yellow card) 52'; Savarese 64'	Stadium: RFK Stadium; Attendance: 14,722; Referee: Kevin Stott
	Shootout
	Agoos (penalty missed); Medved (penalty missed); Crawley (penalty scored); Diaz Arce (penalty missed); Harkes (penalty missed)		(penalty missed) Savarese; (penalty missed) Vermes; (penalty scored) Caricola; (penalty scored) Hernandez; (penalty missed) Donadoni

May 15, 1996 Matchday 8	D.C. United	5–2	Columbus Crew	Washington, D.C.
	Rammel 28', 49', 53'; Diaz Arce 67', 70', (yellow card) 88'	Report	Khumalo (yellow card) 51'; McBride 76'; Paz 85' (pen.)	Stadium: RFK Stadium; Attendance: 7,422; Referee: Esse Baharmast

May 18, 1996 Matchday 9	Dallas Burn	3–2	D.C. United	Dallas, Texas
	Kreis 40', 82'; Eck (yellow card) 63'; Alvarez (yellow card) 75'; Sanchez 88', (yellow card) 90'	Report	Harkes (yellow card) 37'; Sanneh 65'; Agoos 90'	Stadium: Cotton Bowl; Attendance: 23,351; Referee: Arturo Angeles

May 30, 1996 Matchday 10	NY/NJ MetroStars	1–2	D.C. United	East Rutherford, New Jersey
	Kydes (yellow card) 26'; Wood 27'; Knowles (yellow card) 45'	Report	Rammel 19'; Gori (yellow card) 23'; Sanneh 32'; Williams (yellow card) 38'	Stadium: Giants Stadium; Attendance: 25,322; Referee: Zimmerman Boulos

June 2, 1996 Matchday 11	Colorado Rapids	2–2 (1–3 SO)	D.C. United	Denver, Colorado
	Kinnear (yellow card) 34'; Balboa (yellow card) 44'; Trittschuh 67'; Harbor 77'; Kmosko (yellow card) 84'	Report	Diaz Arce 34'; Etcheverry (yellow card) 84'; Maessner 88'	Stadium: Mile High Stadium; Attendance: 8,517; Referee: Kevin Stott
	Shootout
	Henderson (penalty scored); Benedetti (penalty missed); Wegerle (penalty missed); Kinnear (penalty missed)		(penalty scored) Etcheverry; (penalty scored) Medved; (penalty missed) Agoos; (penalty missed) Rammel; (penalty scored) Imler

June 5, 1996 Matchday 12	D.C. United	3–1	San Jose Clash	Washington, D.C.
	Diaz Arce 23'; Etcheverry (yellow card) 32'; Rammel 36', 49'; Williams (yellow card) 69'	Report	Iroha (yellow card) 33'; Emenalo (yellow card) 35'; Rodas (yellow card) 43'; Butler 68'	Stadium: RFK Stadium; Attendance: 15,845; Referee: Paul Tamberino

June 20, 1996 Matchday 13	Kansas City Wiz	5–1	D.C. United	Kansas City, Missouri
	Preki 6' (pen.); Takawira 28', 54'; Chung 30'; Sorber 35'; Johnston (yellow card) 35'	Report	Williams (red card) 5'; Sanneh 42'	Stadium: Arrowhead Stadium; Attendance: 9,458; Referee: Rich Grady

June 23, 1996 Matchday 14	San Jose Clash	2–1	D.C. United	San Jose, California
	Espinoza 41'; Draguicevich (yellow card) 58'; Baicher 66'; Espinoza (yellow card) 86'	Report	Diaz Arce 50'; Rammel (yellow card) 51'; Sanneh (yellow card) 67'	Stadium: Spartan Stadium; Attendance: 14,088; Referee: Frank Gorog

June 30, 1996 Matchday 15	D.C. United	3–1	New England Revolution	Washington, D.C.
	Rammel 1'; Harkes (yellow card) 30'; Diaz Arce 46'; Harkes 89'	Report	Aunger (yellow card) 30'; Naveda 38'	Stadium: RFK Stadium; Attendance: 19,355; Referee: Esse Baharmast

July 4, 1996 Matchday 16	Dallas Burn	1–1 (3–1 SO)	D.C. United	Dallas, Texas
	Kreis 33'; Santel (yellow card) 39'; Sanchez (yellow card) 71'	Report	Sanneh (yellow card) 21'; Diaz Arce 61', (yellow card) 77'	Stadium: Cotton Bowl; Attendance: 16,177; Referee: Tim Weyland
	Shootout
	Ashton (penalty scored); Santel (penalty missed); Sanchez (penalty scored); Farrer (penalty scored)		(penalty missed) Imler; (penalty missed) Kelderman; (penalty scored) Agoos; (penalty missed) Sanneh

July 7, 1996 Matchday 17	D.C. United	6–1	Dallas Burn	Washington, D.C.
	Diaz Arce 3', 48', 61', 63'; Rammel 18', 77'; Williams (yellow card) 68'	Report	Ashton 69'	Stadium: RFK Stadium; Attendance: 11,244; Referee: Paul Tamberino

July 12, 1996 Matchday 18	D.C. United	1–0	Tampa Bay Mutiny	Washington, D.C.
	Etcheverry 72'	Report	Yallop (yellow card) 13'; Kooiman (yellow card) 26'	Stadium: RFK Stadium; Attendance: 20,014; Referee: Robert Sheker

July 20, 1996 Matchday 19	New England Revolution	2–0	D.C. United	Foxborough, Massachusetts
	Aunger (yellow card) 44'; Lips (yellow card) 44'; Woodring (yellow card) 53'; Sawatzky 54', 77', (yellow card) 70'; Paul Keegan (yellow card) 72'; Naveda (yellow card) 81'	Report	Diaz Arce (yellow card) 22' (yellow-red card) 36'	Stadium: Foxboro Stadium; Attendance: 18,347; Referee: Kevin Stott

July 28, 1996 Matchday 20	D.C. United	2–0	Columbus Crew	Washington, D.C.
	Rammel 1'; Marsch 83'	Report	Warzycha (yellow card) 61'	Stadium: RFK Stadium; Attendance: 11,373; Referee: Ruben Rodhas

July 31, 1996 Matchday 21	D.C. United	2–3	Kansas City Wiz	Washington, D.C.
	Medved 9'; Etcheverry 69'	Report	Vaudreuil 19' (o.g.); Preki 32'; Chung 64'	Stadium: RFK Stadium; Attendance: 9,457; Referee: Kevin Terry

August 4, 1996 Matchday 22	D.C. United	2–4	Kansas City Wiz	Washington, D.C.
	Etcheverry (yellow card) 20'; Diaz Arce 32' (pen.); Gori 47'	Report	Chung 16', 59'; Preki (yellow card) 29'; Johnston (yellow card) 30'; Bowers (yellow card) 36'; Sorber (yellow card) 53'; Takawira 66', 78'	Stadium: RFK Stadium; Attendance: 12,356; Referee: Joshua Patlak

August 7, 1996 Matchday 23	Tampa Bay Mutiny	1–3	D.C. United	Tampa, Florida
	McKinley (yellow card) 8'; Pittman (yellow card) 31'; Lassiter 90' (pen.)	Report	Moreno 4'; Agoos (yellow card) 19'; Sanneh (yellow card) 39'; Diaz Arce 45' (pen.), 87'; Etcheverry (yellow card) 53'; Causey (yellow card) 78'	Stadium: Houlihan's Stadium; Attendance: 6,476; Referee: Rich Grady

August 10, 1996 Matchday 24	Columbus Crew	3–2	D.C. United	Columbus, Ohio
	Smith (yellow card) 18'; Iribarren 55'; McBride 57'; Paz 60'	Report	Moreno 27'; Diaz Arce 31'; Pope (yellow card) 75'	Stadium: Ohio Stadium; Attendance: 18,587; Referee: Steve Olson

August 18, 1996 Matchday 25	D.C. United	2–1	Los Angeles Galaxy	Washington, D.C.
	Harkes 3'; Pope 56'	Report	Semioli (yellow card) 64'; Hurtado 77'	Stadium: RFK Stadium; Attendance: 24,536; Referee: Esse Baharmast

August 21, 1996 Matchday 26	NY/NJ MetroStars	2–3	D.C. United	East Rutherford, New Jersey
	de Avila 26', 65'; Ramos (yellow card) 36'; Harty (yellow card) 48'; Zaun (yellow card) 56'	Report	Agoos (yellow card) 27'; Williams 34'; Etcheverry 45', (yellow card) 79'; Diaz Arce (yellow card) 56', (goal) 77'; Pope (yellow card) 59'	Stadium: Giants Stadium; Attendance: 20,416; Referee: Arturo Angeles

August 25, 1996 Matchday 27	D.C. United	3–0	Tampa Bay Mutiny	Washington, D.C.
	Rammel 25'; Moreno 29'; Kelderman 81'	Report		Stadium: RFK Stadium; Attendance: 15,804; Referee: Roberto Van de Wyngard

August 29, 1996 Matchday 28	Colorado Rapids	1–2	D.C. United	Denver, Colorado
	Harbor 40'; Sharpe 56'	Report	Medved 3'; Rammel (yellow card) 38', (goal) 49'; Williams (yellow card) 82'; Causey (yellow card) 85'	Stadium: Mile High Stadium; Attendance: 6,368; Referee: Ali Saheli

September 6, 1996 Matchday 29	D.C. United	1–2	NY/NJ MetroStars	Washington, D.C.
	Sanneh (yellow card) 17', (goal) 50'; Agoos (yellow card) 31'; Rammel (yellow card) 88'	Report	Vermes (yellow card) 13'; de Avila 18', (yellow card) 76'; Joseph 30'; Caricola (yellow card) 37'; da Silva (yellow card) 45'	Stadium: RFK Stadium; Attendance: 8,053; Referee: Zimmerman Boulos

September 14, 1996 Matchday 30	Tampa Bay Mutiny	2–0	D.C. United	Tampa, Florida
	Ralston 4'; Lassiter 51'	Report		Stadium: Houlihan's Stadium; Attendance: 8,135; Referee: Paul Tamberino

September 17, 1996 Matchday 31	D.C. United	3–2	New England Revolution	Washington, D.C.
	Pope 58'; Diaz Arce 62', 89'	Report	Moore 39' (pen.), 78'; Okaroh (yellow card) 57'	Stadium: RFK Stadium; Attendance: 7,360; Referee: Marcel Yonan

September 21, 1996 Matchday 32	D.C. United	3–1	Colorado Rapids	Washington, D.C.
	Diaz Arce 27', 53' (pen.); Gori (yellow card) 60'; Medved 32'	Report	McKay (yellow card) 50'; Hamlett (yellow card) 53'; Henderson 90'	Stadium: RFK Stadium; Attendance: 20,573; Referee: Arturo Angeles

==== Playoffs ====
===== Conference semifinals =====
September 24, 1996 Game 1	NY/NJ MetroStars	2–2 (6–5 SO)	D.C. United	East Rutherford, New Jersey
	de Ávila 38'; Savarese 75'	Report	Díaz Arce 24'; Williams (yellow card) 44'; Moreno 56'	Stadium: Giants Stadium; Attendance: 14,416; Referee: (California) Esse Baharmast
	Shootout
	de Ávila (penalty scored); Donadoni (penalty scored); Ramos (penalty missed); Joseph (penalty scored); Knowles (penalty scored); Silvera (penalty missed); Savarese (penalty scored); Zaun (penalty missed); Meola (penalty missed); Johnson (penalty missed); Vermes (penalty scored)		(penalty scored) Agoos; (penalty scored) Etcheverry; (penalty scored) Moreno; (penalty missed) Díaz Arce; (penalty scored) Sanneh; (penalty missed) Harkes; (penalty scored) Gori; (penalty missed) Williams; (penalty missed) Peay; (penalty missed) Pope; (penalty missed) Causey
Note: MetroStars lead the series 1–0

September 27, 1996 Game 2	D.C. United	1–0	NY/NJ MetroStars	Washington, D.C.
	Etcheverry (yellow card) 5', (goal) 72'; Moreno (red card) 89'	Report	Zaun (yellow card) 47'; Caricola (yellow card) 62'	Stadium: RFK Stadium; Attendance: 21,442; Referee: (Maryland) Paul Tamberino
Note: Series tied 1–1

October 2, 1996 Game 3	D.C. United	2–1	NY/NJ MetroStars	Washington, D.C.
	Peay (yellow card) 61'; Rammel 67'; Díaz Arce 89' (pen.)	Report	Caricola (yellow card) 38'; Joseph (yellow card) 57'; de Ávila 86'; Meola (yellow card) 89'	Stadium: RFK Stadium; Attendance: 20,423; Referee: (California) Brian Hall
Note: D.C. United win series 2–1

===== Conference finals =====
October 10, 1996 Game 1	D.C. United	4–1	Tampa Bay Mutiny	Washington, D.C.
	Díaz Arce 36', 58', 60'; Rammel 54'; Gori (yellow card) 61'	Report	Galderisi (yellow card) 34'; Lassiter 42'; Hunjak (yellow card) 65'	Stadium: RFK Stadium; Attendance: 23,566; Referee: Kevin Stott
Note: D.C. United lead the series 1–0

October 12, 1996 Game 2	Tampa Bay Mutiny	1–2	D.C. United	Tampa, Florida
	Ralston 14'; Vásquez (yellow card) 27'; Valderrama (yellow card) 28' (yellow-red card) 83'; Pittman (yellow card) 54'; McKinley (yellow card) 62'	Report	Agoos (yellow card) 41'; Williams 49'; Moreno (yellow card) 54'; Vaudreuil (yellow card) 63'; Díaz Arce 82'; Simpson (yellow card) 90'	Stadium: Houlihan's Stadium; Attendance: 9,339; Referee: Rich Grady
Note: D.C. United wins series 2–0

===== MLS Cup =====
October 20 Final	LA Galaxy	2–3 (a.e.t.)	D.C. United	Foxborough, Massachusetts
	Hurtado 5', (yellow card) 41'; Armas 56'; Noamouz (yellow card) 74'	Report	Etcheverry (yellow card) 39'; Peay (yellow card) 53'; Sanneh 72'; Medved 81'; Pope 94'	Stadium: Foxboro Stadium; Attendance: 34,643; Referee: Esfandiar Baharmast

=== U.S. Open Cup ===
September 4 Quarterfinals	D.C. United (MLS) (Washington, D.C.)	2–0	(North Carolina) Carolina Dynamo (USISL)	Charlottesville, Virginia
	Rammel 50', 83'; Agoos (yellow card) 87'	Report	Allnutt (yellow card) 87'	Stadium: Klöckner Stadium; Attendance: 1,829; Referee: Ruben Rodhas

October 27 Semifinals	Dallas Burn (MLS) (Texas)	0–2	(Washington, D.C.) D.C. United (MLS)	Dallas, Texas
	Haynes (yellow card) 26'; Soehn (yellow card) 58'; Farrer (yellow card) 63'	Report	Moreno 12', 82'	Stadium: Cotton Bowl; Attendance: 1,958; Referee: Kevin Terry

October 30 Final	D.C. United (MLS) (Washington, D.C.)	3–0	(New York (state)) Rochester Raging Rhinos (A-L)	Washington, D.C.
	Díaz Arce 45'; Pope 63'; Williams (yellow card) 72'; Pope (yellow card) 72'; Moreno 89'	Report	Dauda (yellow card) 77'	Stadium: RFK Stadium; Attendance: 7,234; Referee: Esse Baharast

== League standings ==
=== Conference ===
Pos	Team	Pld	W	SOW	L	GF	GA	GD	Pts	Qualification
1	Tampa Bay Mutiny	32	19	1	12	66	51	+15	58	Qualification for the conference semifinals
2	D.C. United	32	15	1	16	62	56	+6	46	Qualification for the conference semifinals
3	NY/NJ MetroStars	32	12	3	17	45	47	−2	39	Qualification for the conference semifinals
4	Columbus Crew	32	11	4	17	59	60	−1	37	Qualification for the conference semifinals
5	New England Revolution	32	9	6	17	43	56	−13	33	

Source: MLS

=== Overall ===
Pos	Team	Pld	W	SOW	L	GF	GA	GD	Pts	Qualification
1	Tampa Bay Mutiny (S)	32	19	1	12	66	51	+15	58	
2	Los Angeles Galaxy	32	15	4	13	59	49	+10	49	Qualification for the CONCACAF Champions' Cup
3	D.C. United (C)	32	15	1	16	62	56	+6	46	Qualification for the CONCACAF Champions' Cup
4	Dallas Burn	32	12	5	15	50	48	+2	41	
5	Kansas City Wiz	32	12	5	15	61	63	−2	41	
6	NY/NJ MetroStars	32	12	3	17	45	47	−2	39	
7	San Jose Clash	32	12	3	17	50	50	0	39	
8	Columbus Crew	32	11	4	17	59	60	−1	37	
9	New England Revolution	32	9	6	17	43	56	−13	33	
10	Colorado Rapids	32	9	2	21	44	59	−15	29	

Source: MLS
Rules for classification: 1) points; 2) head-to-head record; 3) goal difference; 4) number of goals scored
(C) MLS Cup champions; (S) Supporters' Shield winners

== Transfers ==
=== In ===
Date	Player	Previous club	Fee/notes	Ref
January 24, 1996	(United States) Jeff Agoos	(Germany) Wehen	Allocated	
January 24, 1996	(Bolivia) Marco Etcheverry	(Colombia) América de Cali	Allocated	
January 24, 1996	(United States) John Harkes	(England) West Ham United	Allocated	
January 24, 1996	(Bolivia) Berthy Suárez	(Bolivia) Guabirá	Allocated	
February 6, 1996	(El Salvador) Raúl Díaz Arce	(El Salvador) Luis Ángel Firpo	Drafted	
February 6, 1996	(United States) Shawn Medved	(United States) Seattle Sounders	Drafted	
February 6, 1996	(United States) Erik Imler	(United States) Raleigh Flyers	Drafted	
February 6, 1996	(United States) Richie Williams	(United States) Richmond Kickers	Drafted	
February 6, 1996	(United States) Thor Lee	(United States) Wichita Wings	Drafted	
February 6, 1996	(United States) Brian Kamler	(United States) Richmond Kickers	Drafted	
February 6, 1996	(United States) Mile Milovac	(United States) Indianapolis Twisters	Drafted	
February 6, 1996	(United States) Kris Kelderman	(United States) St. Louis Ambush	Drafted	
February 7, 1996	(United States) Clint Peay	(United States) Virginia Cavaliers	Drafted	
February 7, 1996	(United States) Ben Crawley	(Germany) TuS Celle	Drafted	
February 7, 1996	(Bosnia and Herzegovina) Said Fazlagić	(Bosnia and Herzegovina) Sarajevo	Drafted	
February 7, 1996	(Venezuela) Daniel de Oliveira	(El Salvador) Luis Ángel Firpo	Drafted	
February 7, 1996	(United States) Matthew Olson	(United States) Everett BigFoot	Drafted	
February 7, 1996	(United States) Sterling Wescott	Hawaii Tsunami	Drafted	
February 7, 1996	(United States) Garth Lagerwey	(United States) Hampton Roads Mariners	Drafted	
February 7, 1996	(Mexico) Carlos Garcia	(United States) Myrtle Beach Boyz	Drafted	
April 19, 1996	(United States) Steve Rammel	(United States) Washington Mustangs	Loan	
July 18, 1996	(Bolivia) Jaime Moreno	(England) Middlesbrough	Lottery	
