= 1996 Major League Soccer season =

Inaugural season of Major League Soccer

- Season: 1996
- Teams: 10
- MLS Cup: D.C. United (1st title)
- Supporters' Shield: Tampa Bay Mutiny (1st shield)
- CONCACAF Champions' Cup: D.C. United; Los Angeles Galaxy
- Matches: 160
- Goals: 539 (3.37 per match)
- Top goalscorer: Roy Lassiter (27 goals)
- Longest winning run: Los Angeles Galaxy; Games: 12 (04/13 – 06/30)
- Longest losing run: Columbus Crew; Games: 6 (05/15 – 06/22)
- Highest attendance: 92,216; LA 2–2 TB (June 16, 1996)
- Lowest attendance: 6,013; COL 4–2 KC (August 7, 1996)
- Total attendance: 2,785,001
- Average attendance: 17,406

Locations of teams for the 1996 Major League Soccer season
Western Conference Eastern Conference

The 1996 Major League Soccer season was the inaugural season of Major League Soccer. It was the 84th season of FIFA-sanctioned soccer in the United States, and the 18th with a national first-division league.

== Overview ==
=== Preparation for first season ===
Major League Soccer had originally intended to begin competitive action in 1995. Various difficulties forced the league to postpone its first season until 1996. In preparation for its first season, the league began signing what it called marquee players, beginning with Tab Ramos on January 3, 1995. Beginning in October 1995, the league apportioned the marquee players in the MLS Inaugural Allocations. Each team received two national team and two foreign players in the allocation. The league then invited about 250 players to a tryout the second week of January 1996 on the campus of UC Irvine. On February 6 and 7, 1996, the league held its 1996 MLS Inaugural Player Draft in which the ten teams selected 160 players over sixteen rounds. The Columbus Crew selected Brian McBride with the first pick of the draft. On March 4, 1996, the league then held the 1996 MLS College Draft followed by the 1996 MLS Supplemental Draft later that day. Despite the numerous drafts, the teams were not obligated to sign only players from the drafts.

=== Preseason ===
The preseason began the first week of March. The teams reduced their rosters to twenty-two players by March 25 and had to make a final roster reduction to eighteen by April 15. The teams had a $1,200,000 salary cap with no player allowed to receive more than $192,500. In order to promote American players, teams were limited to five foreigners on the roster.

=== Season ===
Each of the 10 MLS teams played 32 games. A regulation win was worth three points, a shootout win one point, and zero points for a loss in any manner. Fear of alienating fans with tied games had led the league to adopting the shootout when games ended even. The league also adopted a countdown clock instead of running clock, unlike IFAB's standards. The league also divided the teams equally into two conferences – Eastern and Western.

The league began its first season on Saturday, April 6, 1996, when the San Jose Clash hosted D.C. United at Spartan Stadium. ESPN carried the game live which the Clash won on a goal by Eric Wynalda. That goal was selected as the Goal of the Year. The regular season ended on September 22. The playoffs began two days later.

=== Stadiums and locations ===
Team	Stadium	Capacity
Colorado Rapids	Mile High Stadium	76,273
Columbus Crew	Ohio Stadium	102,329
D.C. United	RFK Stadium	46,000
Dallas Burn	Cotton Bowl	92,100
Kansas City Wiz	Arrowhead Stadium	81,425
Los Angeles Galaxy	Rose Bowl	92,542
New England Revolution	Foxboro Stadium	60,292
NY/NJ MetroStars	Giants Stadium	80,200
San Jose Clash	Spartan Stadium	30,456
Tampa Bay Mutiny	Houlihan's Stadium	74,301

=== Personnel and sponsorships ===
Team	Head coach	Captain	Shirt sponsor
Colorado Rapids	(United States) Roy Wegerle		Budweiser
Columbus Crew	(United States) Tom Fitzgerald	(South Africa) Doctor Khumalo	Snickers
D.C. United	(United States) Bruce Arena		MasterCard
Dallas Burn	(United States) Dave Dir		AT&T
Kansas City Wiz	(England) Ron Newman		AT&T
Los Angeles Galaxy	(Germany) Lothar Osiander		Budweiser
New England Revolution	(Republic of Ireland) Frank Stapleton		BIC
NY/NJ MetroStars	(Portugal) Carlos Queiroz	(United States) Peter Vermes	Fujifilm
San Jose Clash	(England) Laurie Calloway	(United States) John Doyle	Honda
Tampa Bay Mutiny	(Netherlands) Thomas Rongen		Bandai

=== Coaching changes ===
Team	Outgoing coach	Manner of departure	Date of vacancy	Incoming coach	Date of appointment
NY/NJ MetroStars	(Italy) Eddie Firmani	Fired	May 24, 1996	(Portugal) Carlos Queiroz	May 30, 1996
Columbus Crew	(Finland) Timo Liekoski	Resigned	August 2, 1996	(United States) Tom Fitzgerald	August 2, 1996
Colorado Rapids	(England) Bob Houghton	Fired	September 10, 1996	(United States) Roy Wegerle	September 13, 1996

== Standings ==
=== Eastern Conference ===
Pos	Team	Pld	W	SOW	L	GF	GA	GD	Pts	Qualification
1	Tampa Bay Mutiny	32	19	1	12	66	51	+15	58	MLS Cup Playoffs
2	D.C. United	32	15	1	16	62	56	+6	46	MLS Cup Playoffs
3	NY/NJ MetroStars	32	12	3	17	45	47	−2	39	MLS Cup Playoffs
4	Columbus Crew	32	11	4	17	59	60	−1	37	MLS Cup Playoffs
5	New England Revolution	32	9	6	17	43	56	−13	33	

Source: MLS

=== Western Conference ===
Pos	Team	Pld	W	SOW	L	GF	GA	GD	Pts	Qualification
1	Los Angeles Galaxy	32	15	4	13	59	49	+10	49	MLS Cup Playoffs
2	Dallas Burn	32	12	5	15	50	48	+2	41	MLS Cup Playoffs
3	Kansas City Wiz	32	12	5	15	61	63	−2	41	MLS Cup Playoffs
4	San Jose Clash	32	12	3	17	50	50	0	39	MLS Cup Playoffs
5	Colorado Rapids	32	9	2	21	44	59	−15	29	

Source: MLS

=== Overall standings ===
Pos	Team	Pld	W	SOW	L	GF	GA	GD	Pts	Qualification
1	Tampa Bay Mutiny (S)	32	19	1	12	66	51	+15	58	
2	Los Angeles Galaxy	32	15	4	13	59	49	+10	49	Qualification for the CONCACAF Champions' Cup
3	D.C. United (C)	32	15	1	16	62	56	+6	46	Qualification for the CONCACAF Champions' Cup
4	Dallas Burn	32	12	5	15	50	48	+2	41	
5	Kansas City Wiz	32	12	5	15	61	63	−2	41	
6	NY/NJ MetroStars	32	12	3	17	45	47	−2	39	
7	San Jose Clash	32	12	3	17	50	50	0	39	
8	Columbus Crew	32	11	4	17	59	60	−1	37	
9	New England Revolution	32	9	6	17	43	56	−13	33	
10	Colorado Rapids	32	9	2	21	44	59	−15	29	

Source: MLS
Rules for classification: 1) points; 2) head-to-head record; 3) goal difference; 4) number of goals scored
(C) MLS Cup champions; (S) Supporters' Shield winners

== MLS Cup playoffs ==
=== Bracket ===
Conference semifinals
E1	Tampa Bay Mutiny	2	1	4
E4	Columbus Crew	0	2	1
Eastern Conference
E2	D.C. United	2 (5)	1	2
E3	NY/NJ MetroStars *(pen.)	2 (6)*	0	1
W1	Los Angeles Galaxy	0	2	2
W4	San Jose Clash	1	0	0
Western Conference
W2	Dallas Burn	2	2	2 (2)
W3	Kansas City Wiz *(pen.)	3	1	2 (3)*

Conference finals
E1	Tampa Bay Mutiny	1	1	x
E2	D.C. United	4	2	x
W1	Los Angeles Galaxy *(pen.)	2	1 (3)*	x
W3	Kansas City Wiz	1	1 (1)	x

MLS Cup
E2	D.C. United (aet)	3
W1	Los Angeles Galaxy	2

- Best of Three series winners will advance.

=== Conference semifinals ===
Eastern Conference

September 24, 1996
Game 1

NY/NJ MetroStars	2–2	D.C. United
De Ávila 38'; Savarese 75'	Report	Díaz Arce 24'; Moreno 56'
Penalties
De Ávila (penalty scored); Donadoni (penalty scored); Ramos (penalty missed); Joseph (penalty scored); Knowles (penalty scored); Silvera (penalty missed); Savarese (penalty scored); Zaun (penalty missed); Meola (penalty missed); Johnson (penalty missed); Vermes (penalty scored)	6–5	(penalty scored) Agoos; (penalty scored) Etcheverry; (penalty scored) Moreno; (penalty missed) Díaz Arce; (penalty scored) Sanneh; (penalty missed) Harkes; (penalty scored) Gori; (penalty missed) Williams; (penalty missed) Peay; (penalty missed) Pope; (penalty missed) Causey

Giants Stadium, East Rutherford, New Jersey
Attendance: 14,416
Referee: Esse Baharmast
September 27, 1996
Game 2

D.C. United	1–0	NY/NJ MetroStars
Etcheverry 72'	Report

RFK Stadium, Washington, D.C.
Attendance: 21,442
Referee: Paul Tamberino
October 2, 1996
Game 3

D.C. United	2–1	NY/NJ MetroStars
Rammel 67'; Díaz Arce 89' (pen.)	Report	De Ávila 86'

RFK Stadium, Washington, D.C.
Attendance: 20,423
Referee: Brian Hall
- D.C. United wins series 2–1, advances to Conference finals.

September 25, 1996
Game 1

Columbus Crew	0–2	Tampa Bay Mutiny
	Report	Lassiter 82', 87'

Ohio Stadium, Columbus, Ohio
Attendance: 20,807
Referee: Brian Hall
September 28, 1996
Game 2

Tampa Bay Mutiny	1–2	Columbus Crew
Lassiter 26'	Report	Paz 1'; McBride 58'

Houlihan's Stadium, Tampa, Florida
Attendance: 13,009
Referee: Rich Grady
October 2, 1996
Game 3

Tampa Bay Mutiny	4–1	Columbus Crew
Vásquez 3'; Lassiter 41', 58'; Pittman 55'	Report	McBride 35'

Houlihan's Stadium, Tampa, Florida
Attendance: 6,871
Referee: Tim Weyland
- Tampa Bay Mutiny wins series 2–1, advances to Conference finals.

Western Conference

September 26, 1996
Game 1

Kansas City Wiz	3–2	Dallas Burn
Johnston 16'; McKeon 79'; Preki 89'	Report	Elliott 21'; Ashton 25'

Arrowhead Stadium, Kansas City, Missouri
Attendance: 4,466
Referee: Tim Weyland
September 29, 1996
Game 2

Dallas Burn	2–1	Kansas City Wiz
Kreis 5'; Washington 32'	Report	Preki 30'

Cotton Bowl, Dallas, Texas
Attendance: 10,125
Referee: Esse Baharmast
October 2, 1996
Game 3

Dallas Burn	2–2	Kansas City Wiz
Sánchez 27'; Elliott 66'	Report	Chung 41'; Takawira 62'
Penalties
Haynes (penalty missed); Lozzano (penalty missed); Sánchez (penalty scored); Farrer (penalty scored); Ashton (penalty missed)	2–3	(penalty missed) Johnston; (penalty scored) Preki; (penalty scored) Klopas; (penalty scored) Wright; (penalty missed) Takawira

Cotton Bowl, Dallas, Texas
Attendance: 9,802
Referee: Rich Grady
- Kansas City Wiz wins series 2–1, advances to Conference finals.

September 26, 1996
Game 1

San Jose Clash	1–0	Los Angeles Galaxy
Ianni 36'	Report

Spartan Stadium, San Jose, California
Attendance: 17,209
Referee: Kevin Stott
September 29, 1996
Game 2

Los Angeles Galaxy	2–0	San Jose Clash
Fraser 84'; Hurtado 90'	Report

Rose Bowl, Pasadena, California
Attendance: 27,833
Referee: Joshua Patlak
October 2, 1996
Game 3

Los Angeles Galaxy	2–0	San Jose Clash
Hurtado 31'; Cienfuegos 36' (pen.)	Report

Rose Bowl, Pasadena, California
Attendance: 30,231
Referee: Esse Baharmast
- Los Angeles Galaxy wins series 2–1, advances to Conference finals.

=== Conference finals ===
Eastern Conference

October 10, 1996
Game 1

D.C. United	4–1	Tampa Bay Mutiny
Díaz Arce 36', 58', 60'; Rammel 54'	Report	Lassiter 42'

RFK Stadium, Washington, D.C.
Attendance: 23,566
Referee: Kevin Stott
October 12, 1996
Game 2

Tampa Bay Mutiny	1–2	D.C. United
Ralston 14'	Report	Williams 49'; Díaz Arce 82'

Houlihan's Stadium, Tampa, Florida
Attendance: 9,339
Referee: Rich Grady
- D.C. United wins series 2–0, advances to MLS Cup.

Western Conference

October 10, 1996
Game 1

Los Angeles Galaxy	2–1	Kansas City Wiz
Armas 48'; Vanney 57'	Report	Preki 52'

Rose Bowl, Pasadena, California
Attendance: 25,212
Referee: Brian Hall
October 13, 1996
Game 2

Kansas City Wiz	1–1	Los Angeles Galaxy
Preki 69'	Report	Vanney 77'
Penalties
Chung (penalty missed); Preki (penalty missed); Wright (penalty scored); Sorber (penalty missed)	1–3	(penalty missed) Noamouz; (penalty scored) Fraser; (penalty missed) Jones; (penalty scored) Cienfuegos; (penalty scored) Vanney

Arrowhead Stadium, Kansas City, Missouri
Attendance: 11,041
Referee: Zimmerman Boulos
- Los Angeles Galaxy wins series 2–0, advances to MLS Cup.

=== MLS Cup ===
October 20, 1996

Los Angeles Galaxy	2–3 (a.e.t.)	D.C. United
Hurtado 5'; Armas 56'	Report	Sanneh 72'; Medved 81'; Pope 94'

Foxboro Stadium, Foxborough, Massachusetts
Attendance: 34,643
Referee: Esse Baharmast

== Player statistics ==
=== Goals ===
Rank	Player	Club	Goals
1	(United States) Roy Lassiter	Tampa Bay Mutiny	27
2	(El Salvador) Raúl Díaz Arce	D.C. United	23
3	(Ecuador) Eduardo Hurtado	Los Angeles Galaxy	21
4	(United States) Preki	Kansas City Wiz	18
5	(United States) Brian McBride	Columbus Crew	17
6	(United States) Steve Rammel	D.C. United	14
7	(United States) Paul Bravo	San Jose Clash	13
7	(United States) Jason Kreis	Dallas Burn	13
7	(Venezuela) Giovanni Savarese	NY/NJ MetroStars	13
7	(Zimbabwe) Vitalis Takawira	Kansas City Wiz	13

=== Hat-tricks ===
Player	Club	Against	Result	Date
(United States) Steve Rammel	D.C. United	Columbus Crew	5–2	May 15
(Venezuela) Giovanni Savarese	NY/NJ MetroStars	Colorado Rapids	3–0	May 16
(Ecuador) Eduardo Hurtado	Los Angeles Galaxy	NY/NJ MetroStars	4–0	June 9
(Ecuador) Eduardo Hurtado	Los Angeles Galaxy	Colorado Rapids	3–1	June 26
(El Salvador) Raúl Díaz Arce^{4}	D.C. United	Dallas Burn	6–1	July 7
(United States) Cobi Jones	Los Angeles Galaxy	Tampa Bay Mutiny	3–4	July 27
(United States) Roy Lassiter	Tampa Bay Mutiny	Colorado Rapids	3–1	August 3
(United States) Brian Maisonneuve	Columbus Crew	Kansas City Wiz	5–1	September 7

=== Assists ===
Rank	Player	Club	Assists
1	(Bolivia) Marco Etcheverry	D.C. United	16
2	(United States) Eric Wynalda	San Jose Clash	11
2	(Colombia) Carlos Valderrama	Tampa Bay Mutiny	11
4	(El Salvador) Mauricio Cienfuegos	Los Angeles Galaxy	10
5	(United States) Preki	Kansas City Wiz	9
5	(United States) Mark Chung	Kansas City Wiz	9
5	(United States) Tab Ramos	NY/NJ Metrostars	9
8	(Uruguay) Adrián Paz	Columbus Crew	8
8	(Italy) Roberto Donadoni	NY/NJ MetroStars	8
8	(United States) John Harkes	D.C. United	8

=== Clean sheets ===
Rank	Player	Club	Clean sheets
1	(United States) Tony Meola	NY/NJ Metrostars	9
2	(United States) Mark Dodd	Dallas Burn	6
3	(Mexico) Jorge Campos	Los Angeles Galaxy	4
3	(United States) Brad Friedel	Columbus Crew	4
3	(England) Aidan Heaney	New England Revolution	4
3	(United States) Tom Liner	San Jose Clash	4
3	(United States) Dave Salzwedel	San Jose Clash	4
8	(United States) Mark Dougherty	Tampa Bay Mutiny	3
8	(United States) Garth Lagerway	Kansas City Wiz	3
8	(United States) Mark Simpson	D.C. United	3

== Awards ==
=== Individual awards ===
Award	Player	Club
Most Valuable Player	(Colombia) Carlos Valderrama	Tampa Bay Mutiny
Defender of the Year	(United States) John Doyle	San Jose Clash
Goalkeeper of the Year	(United States) Mark Dodd	Dallas Burn
Coach of the Year	(Netherlands) Thomas Rongen	Tampa Bay Mutiny
Rookie of the Year	(United States) Steve Ralston	Tampa Bay Mutiny
Scoring Champion	(United States) Roy Lassiter	Tampa Bay Mutiny
Goal of the Year	(United States) Eric Wynalda	San Jose Clash

=== Best XI ===
Goalkeeper	Defenders	Midfielders	Forwards
(United States) Mark Dodd, Dallas	(Colombia) Leonel Álvarez, Dallas (United States) John Doyle, San Jose (United States) Robin Fraser, LA Galaxy	(El Salvador) Mauricio Cienfuegos, LA Galaxy (Italy) Roberto Donadoni, MetroStars (Bolivia) Marco Etcheverry, D.C. United (United States) Preki, Kansas City (Colombia) Carlos Valderrama, Tampa Bay	(Ecuador) Eduardo Hurtado, LA Galaxy (United States) Roy Lassiter, Tampa Bay

=== Player of the Month ===
Month	Player	Club	Stats
April	(El Salvador) Mauricio Cienfuegos	Los Angeles Galaxy	2G
May	(Colombia) Carlos Valderrama	Tampa Bay Mutiny	2G, 4A
June	(Ecuador) Eduardo Hurtado	Los Angeles Galaxy	7G, 1A
July	(United States) Jason Kreis	Dallas Burn	5G
August	(Bolivia) Marco Etcheverry	D.C. United	1G, 8A
September	(United States) Brad Friedel	Columbus Crew	2GA

=== Weekly awards ===
Player of the Week
Week	Player	Club
Week 1	(United States) Eric Wynalda	San Jose Clash
Week 2	(United States) Brian McBride	Columbus Crew
Week 3	(United States) Marcelo Balboa	Colorado Rapids
Week 4	(United States) Bo Oshoniyi	Columbus Crew
Week 5	(Venezuela) Giovanni Savarese	NY/NJ MetroStars
Week 6	(United States) Brian McBride	Columbus Crew
Week 7	(Mexico) Jorge Campos	Los Angeles Galaxy
Week 8	(United States) Preki	Kansas City Wiz
Week 9	(United States) John Doyle	San Jose Clash
Week 10	(Ecuador) Eduardo Hurtado	Los Angeles Galaxy
Week 11	(United States) Mark Dodd	Dallas Burn
Week 12	(United States) Mark Chung	Kansas City Wiz
Week 13	(United States) Tony Meola	NY/NJ MetroStars
Week 14	(El Salvador) Raúl Díaz Arce	D.C. United
Week 15	(United States) Paul Bravo	San Jose Clash
Week 16	(United States) Cobi Jones	Los Angeles Galaxy
Week 17	(United States) Joe-Max Moore	New England Revolution
Week 18	(United States) Tony Meola	NY/NJ MetroStars
Week 19	(Uruguay) Adrián Paz	Columbus Crew
Week 20	(Bolivia) Marco Etcheverry	D.C. United
Week 21	(United States) Brad Friedel	Columbus Crew
Week 22	(United States) Brian Maisonneuve	Columbus Crew
Week 23	(Canada) Frank Yallop	Tampa Bay Mutiny
Week 24	(United States) Brad Friedel	Columbus Crew

== Attendance ==
Rank	Team	GP	Cumulative	High	Low	Mean
1	Los Angeles Galaxy	16	462,650	92,216	8,561	28,916
2	NY/NJ Metrostars	16	382,360	53,250	14,007	23,898
3	New England Revolution	16	304,392	38,633	11,009	19,025
4	Columbus Crew	16	303,202	31,550	12,832	18,950
5	San Jose Clash	16	275,712	31,728	10,894	17,232
6	Dallas Burn	16	256,173	35,250	7,338	16,011
7	D.C. United	16	244,199	35,032	7,360	15,262
8	Kansas City Wiz	16	206,044	21,141	8,062	12,878
9	Tampa Bay Mutiny	16	186,856	26,473	6,281	11,679
10	Colorado Rapids	16	163,413	21,711	6,013	10,213
Total		160	2,785,001	92,216	6,013	17,406
