= MLS Cup 1997 =

1997 edition of the MLS Cup

- Event: MLS Cup
| D.C. United | Colorado Rapids |
| 2 | 1 |
- Date: October 26, 1997
- Venue: Robert F. Kennedy Memorial Stadium, Washington, D.C., U.S.
- MLS Cup MVP: Jaime Moreno (D.C. United)
- Referee: Brian Hall
- Attendance: 57,431
- Weather: Rain, 46 °F (8 °C)

MLS Cup 1997 was the second edition of the MLS Cup, the post-season championship match of Major League Soccer (MLS) in the United States. It was played on October 26, 1997, between D.C. United and the Colorado Rapids to determine the champion of the 1997 season. The soccer match was played in front of 57,431 spectators at RFK Memorial Stadium in Washington, D.C.

D.C. United were defending champions and finished atop the Eastern Conference and the overall league standings despite being strained by runs in multiple competitions. Colorado had overhauled their roster after finishing last overall in the 1996 season and qualified for the playoffs with a losing record, finishing fourth in the Western Conference, but earned two upset victories in the playoffs. As finalists, D.C. United and the Colorado Rapids both earned berths to play in the 1998 CONCACAF Champions' Cup.

During a rainstorm that mirrored the previous final, D.C. repeated as MLS Cup champions by winning 2–1. The hosts took a lead through Jaime Moreno in the 37th minute and extended it with a header by Tony Sanneh in the 68th minute. Substitute Adrián Paz scored a consolation goal for Colorado in the 75th minute, but the team were unable to draw level despite several chances. The announced crowd of 57,431 was the second-largest attendance for a sporting event at RFK Memorial Stadium.

== Venue ==
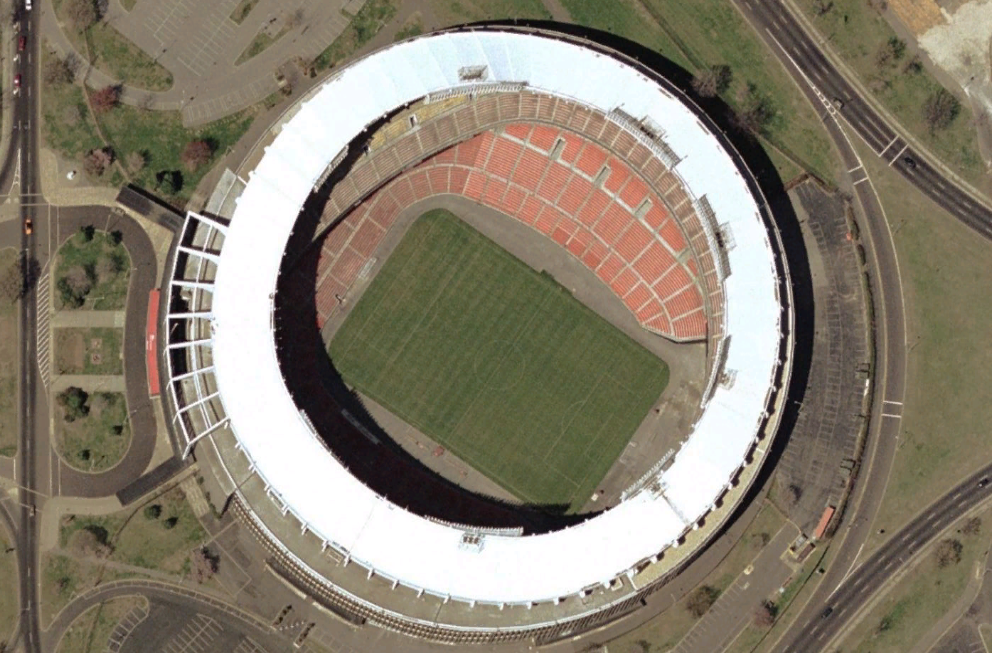
Aerial view of RFK Memorial Stadium in Washington, D.C., the host venue of MLS Cup 1997

RFK Memorial Stadium in Washington, D.C., the home of defending champions D.C. United, was selected as the host of the second MLS Cup on December 17, 1996. The stadium was opened in 1961 and was primarily used for American football and baseball, but previously hosted the 1980 Soccer Bowl and the 1996 U.S. Open Cup Final. It also hosted several matches during the 1994 FIFA World Cup and 1996 Olympics men's soccer tournament.

The league sold 32,000 tickets for the final in mid-October after D.C. United advanced to the conference finals. After the team clinched an appearance in the final, the remainder of the stadium's 56,000 seats were sold out and 1,000 bleacher seats were added.

== Road to the final ==
The MLS Cup is the post-season championship of Major League Soccer (MLS), a professional club soccer league based in the United States that began play in 1996. The league's second season was contested by ten teams organized into two conferences, each playing 32 matches during the regular season from April to September. Teams faced opponents from the same conference four times during the regular season and from outside their conference three or four times. MLS continued to use the modified version of the sport's rules that it adopted for the 1996 season, including a penalty shootout from 35 yards (32 m) to decide tied matches (for which the winners earned one point) and a countdown clock that stopped during dead plays.

The top four teams from each conference qualified for the playoffs, which were organized into three rounds and played in October. The first two rounds, named the conference semifinals and conference finals, were home-and-away series organized into a best-of-three format with a hosting advantage for the higher seed. The winners of the conference finals advanced to the single-match MLS Cup final, which would be held at a predetermined neutral venue.

MLS Cup 1997 was contested by defending champions and hosts D.C. United, who finished first in the regular season standings, and the Colorado Rapids, who finished fourth in the Western Conference. The two finalists swept through the playoffs by winning the conference semifinals and conference finals in two legs. During three regular season meetings between the two teams, D.C. won 5–2 in April and 5–0 in June, while Colorado won in a shootout following a 2–2 draw in August. The Rapids reached the final through a "Cinderella run" in the playoffs and were considered underdogs to defending champions D.C. United.

=== D.C. United ===
Inaugural season champions D.C. United retained most of their players and made few changes during the offseason, trading midfielder Shawn Medved to the San Jose Clash and acquiring defender Carlos Llamosa in the supplemental draft. Nine of their starting players were called up at various times to their national teams for World Cup qualifying, giving reserve players an opportunity to earn a starting spot. D.C. went on a preseason tour that included matches in Japan and Hong Kong, earning a 6–2 win–loss record, and returned to open the season against MLS Cup opponents Los Angeles Galaxy with a shootout win.

D.C. earned one shootout win and three wins in regulation time to put them atop the Eastern Conference standings early in the season, highlighted by the performance of rookie goalkeeper Scott Garlick, who replaced starter Mark Simpson during his stint with an indoor team. The team then drew four times and lost three of the shootouts, briefly losing first place in the East in May before retaking it by the end of the month. Despite losing Bolivian players Marco Etcheverry and Jaime Moreno to the national team for six weeks, D.C. won their next five matches but lost 6–1 to the Kansas City Wizards on June 21, ending a 22-match unbeaten streak in regulation time. D.C. United also had six players in the starting lineup for the All-Star Game, which was won 5–4 by the East.

After the All-Star Game in early July, D.C. United went through a series of underwhelming performances, including three regulation losses and one shootout loss in six matches, blamed in part on injuries to Etcheverry and captain John Harkes. The team then entered a stretch of 13 matches in 36 days, forced by their participation in the CONCACAF Champions' Cup (finishing third) and U.S. Open Cup (advancing to the semifinals). D.C. United went 8–4–1 in all competitions through the end of August, including three wins out of four matches in regular season play during a stretch of five matches in twelve days. The team made further changes to their goalkeepers, as Simpson had undergone two knee surgeries and backup Jeff Causey was signed by the New England Revolution; in their place, Scott Garlick and rookie Tom Presthus were rotated between matches as starters. On August 17, Mario Gori and Raúl Díaz Arce were arrested for an alleged rape at a Columbus hotel, but released the following day on bail and allowed to continue playing for the team; the case was later dropped without charges in January 1998 after the alleged victim declined to continue.

D.C. earned their playoff berth with their first win against the Kansas City Wizards in franchise history after five earlier losses, and subsequently clinched first place in the Eastern Conference with a 3–2 shootout win against New England. The team continued to heavily rotate lineups and rested eight starting players in the second of a home-and-away series against the Tampa Bay Mutiny, winning 5–1 despite losing the first match with most of their regular starters. D.C. finished the regular season atop the league-wide standings with 55 points and a 21–11 record, but fell short of matching the Mutiny's record 58 points from the 1996 season after losing to the MetroStars in their last match. The team showed its roster depth by using a different lineup for all 39 league and cup matches, including 24 different starting players. Bruce Arena was named MLS Coach of the Year, Eddie Pope was named Defender of the Year, and four United players were included in the MLS Best XI.

D.C. faced New England in the conference semifinals and earned a 4–1 victory in the first leg of the series at home. Roy Wegerle, a midseason signing from Colorado, scored to give United a half-time lead and added a second before Jaime Moreno scored two more; New England defender Mike Burns scored a consolation goal with a minute left in the match. In the away leg at Foxboro Stadium, D.C. were held to a 1–1 draw in regulation time, with a goal for Richie Williams canceled out by Joe-Max Moore's penalty kick in the 72nd minute. The two teams played in a seven-round shootout that ended 4–3 in United's favor after a series of saves from goalkeepers Walter Zenga and Tom Presthus that was broken up by defender Carlos Llamosa's conversion.

In the conference finals, D.C. played the third-seeded Columbus Crew after they had eliminated the Tampa Bay Mutiny. In the first leg, played without Etcheverry who was on national team duty, United took a three-goal half-time lead that was reduced by two for a 3–2 victory after a second half surge in pressure and chances from the Crew. D.C. clinched their second MLS Cup appearance with a 1–0 win at Ohio Stadium in Columbus, with Díaz Arce scoring the lone goal in the 47th minute from within the six-yard (5.5 m) box.

=== Colorado Rapids ===
The Colorado Rapids finished last overall in MLS during the league's inaugural season, with a 11–21 record under head coach Bob Houghton, who was replaced in the offseason by Glenn Myernick. Myernick and new general manager Dan Counce implemented a possession-oriented style and overhauled the Rapids roster by signing eleven new players, including trades to acquire defender Peter Vermes and midfielders Paul Bravo and Adrián Paz. The team also signed goalkeeper Marcus Hahnemann and forward Wolde Harris from the second-division A-League and were allocated Mexican midfielder David Patiño by the league.

After a short preseason tour in Mexico and Florida, the Rapids opened the season without forward Jean Harbor and several defenders who were either injured or called up to national team duty, winning only twice in their first seven matches. The team were able to consistently earn wins through the summer, with a 9–10 record by mid-July that allowed them to reach second in the Western Conference. Their record improved to 14–12 in mid-August while remaining in second place, trailing the conference-leading Kansas City Wizards by eight points.

The final seven matches of the Rapids season would be played against fellow teams in the Western Conference with higher stakes in playoffs positioning. The team entered a six-match losing streak, which included three losses to the Wizards, but qualified for the playoffs despite dropping to fourth place. Colorado won their final regular season match against San Jose and finished with a losing record of 14 wins and 18 losses. Leading goalscorers Bravo and Chris Henderson, along with defender Marcelo Balboa, were credited with the team's improved regular season performance.

In the conference semifinals, Colorado faced the Wizards, who had defeated the Rapids in all of their regular season meetings. The first leg at Kansas City's Arrowhead Stadium finished in a 3–0 upset victory for the Rapids, despite missing Paz and Balboa. The victory was credited to a disciplined performance by the Rapids defense, several saves from goalkeeper Marcus Hahnemann, and attackers who took advantage of mistakes from the Wizards. The Rapids began the second leg at home by conceding a goal to Wizards forward Vitalis Takawira, but equalized within minutes and took a lead after half-time with goals from Paul Bravo. The match ended in a 3–2 win for Colorado, who swept the playoffs series.

The Rapids advanced to play in the conference final against the Dallas Burn, who had defeated the Los Angeles Galaxy in another upset from the semifinals. Colorado won 1–0 in the first leg, played in Dallas, with a header in the 42nd minute from defender Sean Henderson; the Burn had several chances to equalize, including a free kick in the final five seconds that hit the post, but were unable to capitalize. In the second leg, played at Mile High Stadium in Denver, Dallas took an early lead in the fifth minute but were set back by an equalizer from David Patiño in the 23rd minute. The match remained tied until a scissored volley from Chris Henderson in the 87th minute clinched a 2–1 victory to win the conference championship for Colorado. The team became the first to take a pair of brothers, Chris and Sean Henderson, to the MLS Cup.

=== Summary of results ===
Note: In all results below, the score of the finalist is given first (H: home; A: away). Playoffs were in best-of-three format with penalty shootout if scores were tied.

| D.C. United | | Round | Colorado Rapids | |
|---|---|---|---|---|
| 1st place in Eastern Conference: Pos. / Club / Pld. / W / SW / L / Pts.; 1 / D.C. United (SS) / 32 / 17 / 4 / 11 / 55; 2 / Tampa Bay Mutiny / 32 / 14 / 3 / 15 / 45; 3 / Columbus Crew / 32 / 12 / 3 / 17 / 39; 4 / New England Revolution / 32 / 11 / 4 / 17 / 37; 5 / NY/NJ MetroStars / 32 / 11 / 2 / 19 / 35; Source: MLS Qualified for playoffs Supporters' Shield winner | | Regular season | 4th place in Western Conference: Pos. / Club / Pld. / W / SW / L / Pts.; 1 / Kansas City Wizards / 32 / 14 / 7 / 11 / 49; 2 / Los Angeles Galaxy / 32 / 14 / 2 / 16 / 44; 3 / Dallas Burn / 32 / 13 / 3 / 16 / 42; 4 / Colorado Rapids / 32 / 12 / 2 / 18 / 38; 5 / San Jose Clash / 32 / 9 / 3 / 20 / 30; Source: MLS Qualified for playoffs | |
| Opponent | Results | MLS Cup Playoffs | Opponent | Results |
| New England Revolution (2–0) | 4–1 (H), 1–1 (4–3 SO) (A) | Conference semifinals | Kansas City Wizards (2–0) | 3–0 (A), 3–2 (H) |
| Columbus Crew (2–0) | 3–2 (H), 1–0 (A) | Conference finals | Dallas Burn (2–0) | 1–0 (A), 2–1 (H) |

== Broadcasting ==
The match was broadcast on ABC in the United States, where it was watched by an estimated television audience of 2.2 million viewers, setting a record that would stand until the 2016 final. Phil Schoen and Ty Keough reprised their roles from the previous final as play-by-play and color commentator, respectively. The match was also televised in more than 100 foreign markets by ESPN International; it was the first MLS Cup to be broadcast in the United Kingdom, where it aired on Eurosport.

== Match ==
=== Summary ===
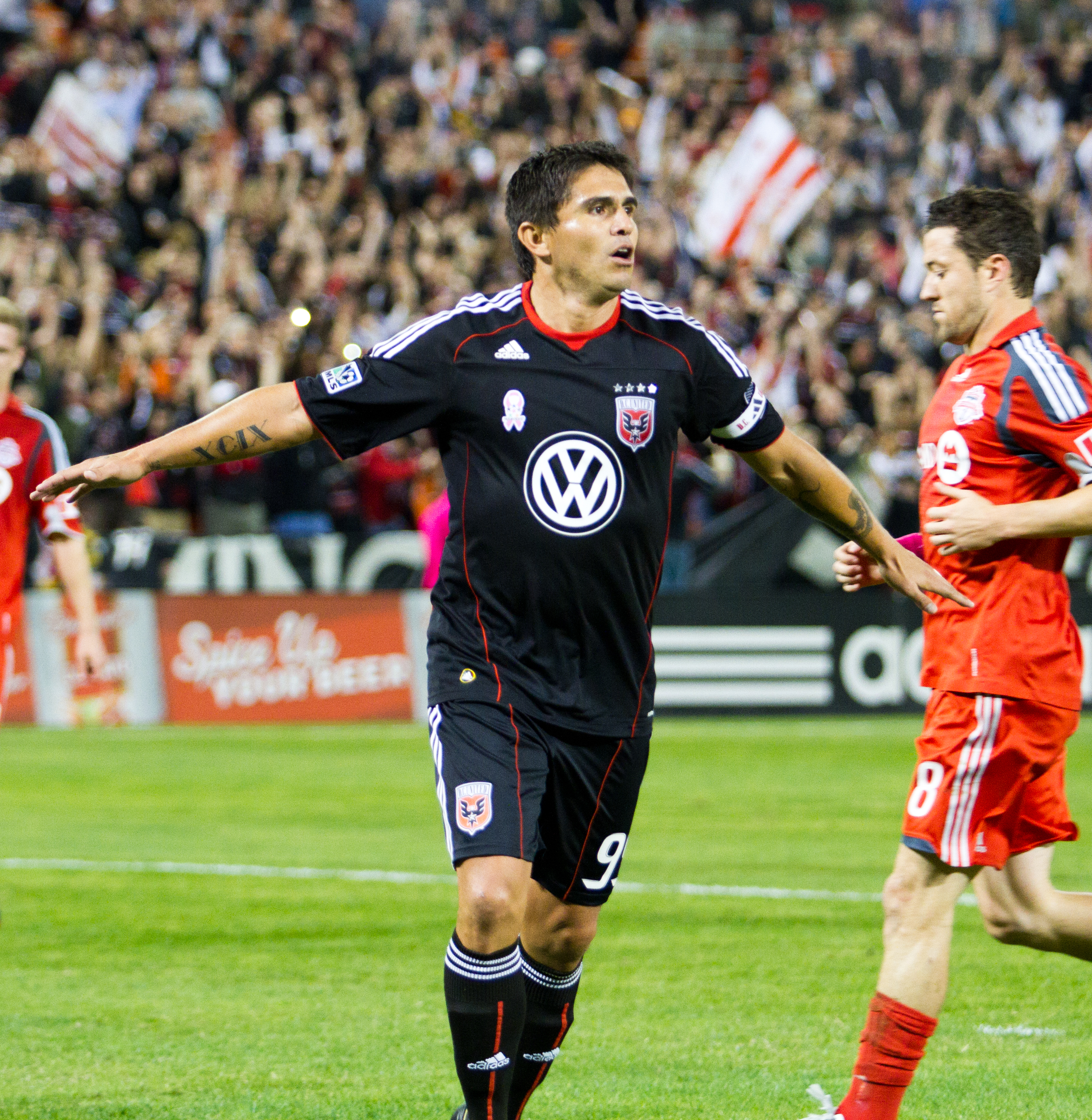
D.C. forward Jaime Moreno scored the opening goal and was named the match's most valuable player.

The MLS Cup final kicked off at 3:30 p.m. with an announced sellout crowd of 57,431 spectators at RFK Memorial Stadium, setting a new attendance record for a single playoff match. The match was played during a rainstorm in cold conditions, which mirrored the weather during the inaugural final and deterred some ticket-holding fans from attending. D.C. controlled the opening minutes, taking their first shot within 25 seconds, but Colorado used counterattacks to find chances and force goalkeeper Scott Garlick to make three saves and a foul that earned him a yellow card. The hosts responded with their own counterattacking plays that were channeled by Tony Sanneh towards Jaime Moreno, who could not finish his first few chances.

D.C. took a 1–0 lead in the 37th minute after a cross from Sanneh to Raúl Díaz Arce, who dummied the ball at the top of the penalty area. The cross fell to Moreno, who took a shot from 12 yards (11 m) that rolled past Marcus Hahnemann and two Colorado defenders. The Rapids were outshot 8–5 in the first half, with only one shot in the final 24 minutes. They attempted to find an equalizer early in the second half and had two chances through David Patiño that were not finished after missing a through ball and later hitting teammate Steve Rammel.

Sanneh extended the lead for D.C. in the 68th minute, scoring with a header at the far post on a high cross from John Harkes after cleaning up a cleared corner kick. The team continued its attacking pressure, but shifted to a defensive style to prepare for counterattacks from the Rapids. Marcelo Balboa moved up into the midfield and attempted a bicycle kick in the 70th minute that was saved by Garlick. Colorado scored a consolation goal in the 75th minute from substitute Adrián Paz, who struck the ball from a tight angle in the penalty area on an assist from Patiño. A chance to equalize came less than a minute later as Rapids forward Wolde Harris took an unimpeded shot from 20 yards (18 m) that flew over the crossbar. D.C. responded with their own attacks that were shut down by the Rapids, including two fouls that were described as potential penalty kicks that went uncalled by referee Brian Hall. The hosts won 2–1 to claim their second MLS Cup title; Moreno was named the MLS Cup Most Valuable Player for his performance, which included setting up plays throughout the match.

=== Details ===
October 26, 1997
3:30 p.m. EDT

| D.C. United | 2–1 | Colorado Rapids |
|---|---|---|
| Moreno 37'; Sanneh 68' | Report | Paz 75' |

Robert F. Kennedy Memorial Stadium, Washington, D.C.
Attendance: 57,431
Referee: Brian Hall

| D.C. United | Colorado Rapids |

| GK | 1 | (United States) Scott Garlick | (yellow card) 20' |
| DF | 12 | (United States) Jeff Agoos |
| DF | 18 | (Colombia) Carlos Llamosa |
| DF | 23 | (United States) Eddie Pope |
| DF | 24 | (United States) David Vaudreuil |
| MF | 10 | (Bolivia) Marco Etcheverry |
| MF | 6 | (United States) John Harkes (c) |
| MF | 20 | (United States) Tony Sanneh |
| MF | 16 | (United States) Richie Williams |
| FW | 21 | (El Salvador) Raúl Díaz Arce |
| FW | 9 | (Bolivia) Jaime Moreno |
Substitutes:
None used
Head coach:
(United States) Bruce Arena

| GK | 1 | (United States) Marcus Hahnemann |
| DF | 12 | (United States) Matt Kmosko |
| DF | 21 | (United States) Chris Martinez | | (substituted off) 59' |
| DF | 4 | (United States) Steve Trittschuh |
| DF | 2 | (United States) Peter Vermes |
| MF | 17 | (United States) Marcelo Balboa (c) | (yellow card) 86' |
| MF | 8 | (United States) Paul Bravo | | (substituted off) 27' |
| MF | 19 | (United States) Chris Henderson |
| MF | 3 | (United States) Sean Henderson | | (substituted off) 81' |
| FW | 6 | (Mexico) David Patiño |
| FW | 10 | (United States) Steve Rammel |
Substitutes:
| FW | 23 | (Jamaica) Wolde Harris | | (substituted on) 27' |
| MF | 11 | (Uruguay) Adrián Paz | | (substituted on) 59' |
| MF | 20 | (United States) Ross Paule | | (substituted on) 81' |
Head coach:
(United States) Glenn Myernick

MLS Cup Most Valuable Player:
Jaime Moreno (D.C. United)

Assistant referees:
Steve Olson
Greg Barkey
Fourth official:
Paul Tamberino

Match rules

- 90 minutes of regulation time with a countdown clock.
- Two 15-minute periods of extra time with golden goals to decide a winner.
- Penalty shootout from 35 yards if scores still tied.
- Maximum of three substitutions.

== Post-match ==
MLS Cup 1997 was the first sports championship for the Washington, D.C., area to be won at a stadium in the city. The announced attendance of 57,431 came within 600 spectators of breaking the overall record for largest sporting event at RFK Memorial Stadium, held by the United States–Portugal match during the 1996 Summer Olympics. It was the first day in which there were large sporting events at both of the major outdoor stadiums in the D.C. area, as Jack Kent Cooke Stadium also hosted a National Football League game. A railing in the upper stands at RFK Memorial Stadium collapsed during the celebrations after the match, causing minor injuries to 50 fans.

Three days after the MLS Cup final, D.C. United played the Dallas Burn in the U.S. Open Cup final with a chance to earn the league's first "treble". The Burn and United played to a scoreless draw and D.C. lost 5–3 in the ensuing penalty shootout. The team, with the exception of Etcheverry and Moreno on national team duty, was honored with a reception at the White House by President Bill Clinton. D.C. returned to the MLS Cup in 1998, where they lost to the Chicago Fire, and in 1999, where they defeated the Los Angeles Galaxy.

D.C. and Colorado qualified as the U.S. representatives for the 1998 CONCACAF Champions' Cup, which was hosted at RFK Memorial Stadium in Washington, D.C. The Rapids were eliminated in the qualifying playoff round, played in a home-and-away series against Club León of Mexico, by a 4–3 aggregate score. D.C. entered the competition in the quarterfinals and eliminated Trinidadian club Joe Public, León, and Mexican champion Toluca on their way to winning the Champions' Cup, becoming the first American team to be crowned as continental champions. United then advanced to the 1998 Copa Interamericana, where they defeated South American champions Vasco da Gama of Brazil over two legs played in the United States.
