= MLS Cup 1996 =

Inaugural edition of the MLS Cup

- Event: MLS Cup
| D.C. United | Los Angeles Galaxy |
| 3 | 2 |
- After golden goal overtime
- Date: October 20, 1996
- Venue: Foxboro Stadium, Foxborough, Massachusetts, U.S.
- MLS Cup MVP: Marco Etcheverry; (D.C. United)
- Referee: Esse Baharmast
- Attendance: 34,643
- Weather: Rain, 54 °F (12 °C)

MLS Cup 1996 was the inaugural edition of the MLS Cup, the championship match of Major League Soccer (MLS), the top-level soccer league of the United States. Hosted at Foxboro Stadium in Foxborough, Massachusetts, on October 20, 1996, it was contested by D.C. United and the Los Angeles Galaxy to decide the champion of the 1996 season.

Both finalists finished in the top two spots of their respective conferences, with D.C. placing second in the East and Los Angeles atop the West. The two teams also had identical win–loss records in the first two rounds of the playoffs, losing the opening match of the Conference Semifinals and winning the remaining four matches of both rounds. The final match was played in heavy rain due to the proximity of Hurricane Lili, which also inundated the field. The MLS Cup had an attendance of 34,643 spectators, falling short of the 42,000 people who paid for tickets, and included a large contingent of traveling D.C. supporters.

The match ended in a 3–2 victory for D.C. United, with a golden goal scored by Eddie Pope in overtime that followed a second-half comeback for the team. Los Angeles had taken a 2–0 lead in the 56th minute on goals by Eduardo Hurtado and Chris Armas, but conceded two goals to D.C. in the second half to force overtime. Marco Etcheverry assisted both goals, which began as free kicks that were headed into the goal by substitutes Tony Sanneh and Shawn Medved. Etcheverry went on to take the corner kick that led to Pope's goal and was named the man of the match. The finalists also earned a berth in the 1997 CONCACAF Champions' Cup and met in the semifinals, which ended in a victory for the Galaxy.

== Venue ==
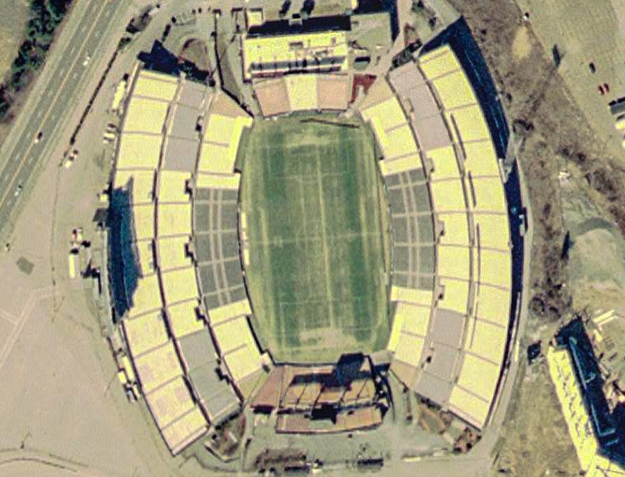
Aerial view of Foxboro Stadium, the host venue of MLS Cup 1996

Foxboro Stadium in the Boston suburb of Foxborough, Massachusetts, was announced as the venue of the inaugural MLS Cup during a league press conference on August 29, 1996. The other finalist, Robert F. Kennedy Memorial Stadium in Washington, D.C., was instead given hosting priority for the 1997 edition. The 58,098-seat stadium was the home venue of the New England Revolution and the New England Patriots of the National Football League. The league had planned to limit capacity to 33,000 seats for the championship, but canceled those plans as ticket sales reached more than 40,000 in the days prior to the cup.

== Road to the final ==
Major League Soccer (MLS) was formed as the Division I league of the United States in the early 1990s during organization of the 1994 FIFA World Cup to comply with FIFA's hosting requirements. The league decided on a playoff format to determine its yearly champion in a fashion similar to other sports leagues in North America. It also adopted an Americanized version of the game's rules, including a 35-yard (32 m) shootout to decide tied matches (for which the winners earned one point) and a countdown clock to keep time.

The inaugural MLS season was delayed to 1996 and consisted of ten teams organized into two conferences, divided between east and west. Each team played 32 matches in the regular season, which ran from April to September, facing opponents from the same conference four times and outside of their conference three to four times. The top four teams from each conference qualified for the playoffs, which were organized into three rounds and played from late September to October. The first two rounds, named the Conference Semifinals and Conference Finals, were home-and-away series organized into a best-of-three format with a hosting advantage for the higher seed. The winners of the Conference Finals advanced to the single-match MLS Cup final, which would be held at a predetermined neutral venue.

MLS Cup 1996 was contested by D.C. United, who finished second in the Eastern Conference, and the Los Angeles Galaxy, who finished first in the Western Conference. The two finalists played each other three times during the regular season, with the Galaxy winning away 2–1 on April 20 and at home 3–1 on May 5, D.C. winning 2–1 on August 18 at RFK Memorial Stadium. Both teams finished with a 4–1 record in the playoffs, losing only the opening match of the Conference Semifinals, and shared comparable records during the regular season.

=== D.C. United ===
Washington, D.C., was awarded an MLS franchise on June 15, 1994, which would play at RFK Memorial Stadium and later be named D.C. United. The league allocated U.S. defender Jeff Agoos, U.S. midfielder John Harkes, and Bolivian forwards Marco Etcheverry and Juan Berthy Suárez to D.C. United, which signed former University of Virginia Cavaliers coach Bruce Arena as its manager in January 1996. In the general player draft, D.C. was given the last pick and signed Salvadorian forward Raúl Díaz Arce in the first round, completing a trio of Latin American attackers, and several starting players in later rounds. With its two picks in the college draft, United selected defender Eddie Pope in the first round and midfielder Jesse Marsch in the third round; in the supplemental draft, D.C. used its single pick on Argentine midfielder Mario Gori.

D.C. United played in the inaugural league match against the San Jose Clash at Spartan Stadium on April 6, losing 1–0 to a goal by Eric Wynalda. The team went on to lose three more matches in April, including its home opener, before defeating the Dallas Burn on May 1 by a score of 3–1. In their next victory, 5–2 on May 15 against the Columbus Crew, newly added forward Steve Rammel scored the first hat-trick in league history while Etcheverry recorded three assists. D.C. went on to win three matches in a row to start June and earn the second-place spot in the Eastern Conference, trailing the Tampa Bay Mutiny by eight points. Bruce Arena spent part of his time in June and July as coach of the Olympic team, causing him to miss several D.C. matches.

The team remained in second place behind Tampa Bay for much of July and August, with a losing record, but was the fourth-highest scoring team in the league. The points gap between the two teams had increased to eleven at the beginning of August, but was reduced to five after D.C. United defeated the Mutiny three times. D.C. won four straight matches in late August and clinched a playoff berth, but still fell short of home-field advantage in the playoffs. The team finished the season with two more wins and two losses, retaining its second-place spot with a 16–16 record.

In the first round of the playoffs, D.C. played the third-place New York/New Jersey MetroStars, with whom they had developed a rivalry. The first leg, played at Giants Stadium on September 24, was the first playoff match in league history and ended in a 2–2 draw in regular time. The MetroStars won the match 6–5 in a shootout, which lasted eleven rounds until captain Peter Vermes scored the winning goal. Vermes was originally scheduled to be the eighth kicker for the MetroStars, but requested to be moved to the eleventh round because of an injury; D.C. officials claimed that the move made him an ineligible kicker and disputed the result, which the league ruled was valid. United won the second leg at home with a lone goal by Marco Etcheverry in the 72nd minute, following several hard tackles and an ejection for D.C. striker Jaime Moreno, to set up the third leg at RFK Memorial Stadium. D.C. United took a 1–0 lead in the 65th minute of the match on a goal by Rammel off a deflection by several MetroStars defenders. The MetroStars responded with an equalizing goal in the 86th minute on a strike by Antony de Ávila, but conceded a penalty in the final minute of regular time after Rob Johnson tripped Etcheverry. Díaz Arce converted the penalty kick to give D.C. a 2–1 win and clinch their place in the Eastern Conference Final.

United faced the Tampa Bay Mutiny, the regular season champions with a home advantage, in the Eastern Conference Final, which was rescheduled due to stadium conflicts for both teams. D.C. hosted the first leg and took advantage of Tampa's missing defender Frank Yallop to win 4–1 after being tied 1–1 at halftime. Díaz Arce scored a hat-trick, while Rammel scored the winning goal with a header in the 54th minute. D.C. United went on to win 2–1 in the second leg hosted by Tampa Bay, with goals by Richie Williams and Díaz Arce in the second half to clinch an MLS Cup appearance.

=== Los Angeles Galaxy ===
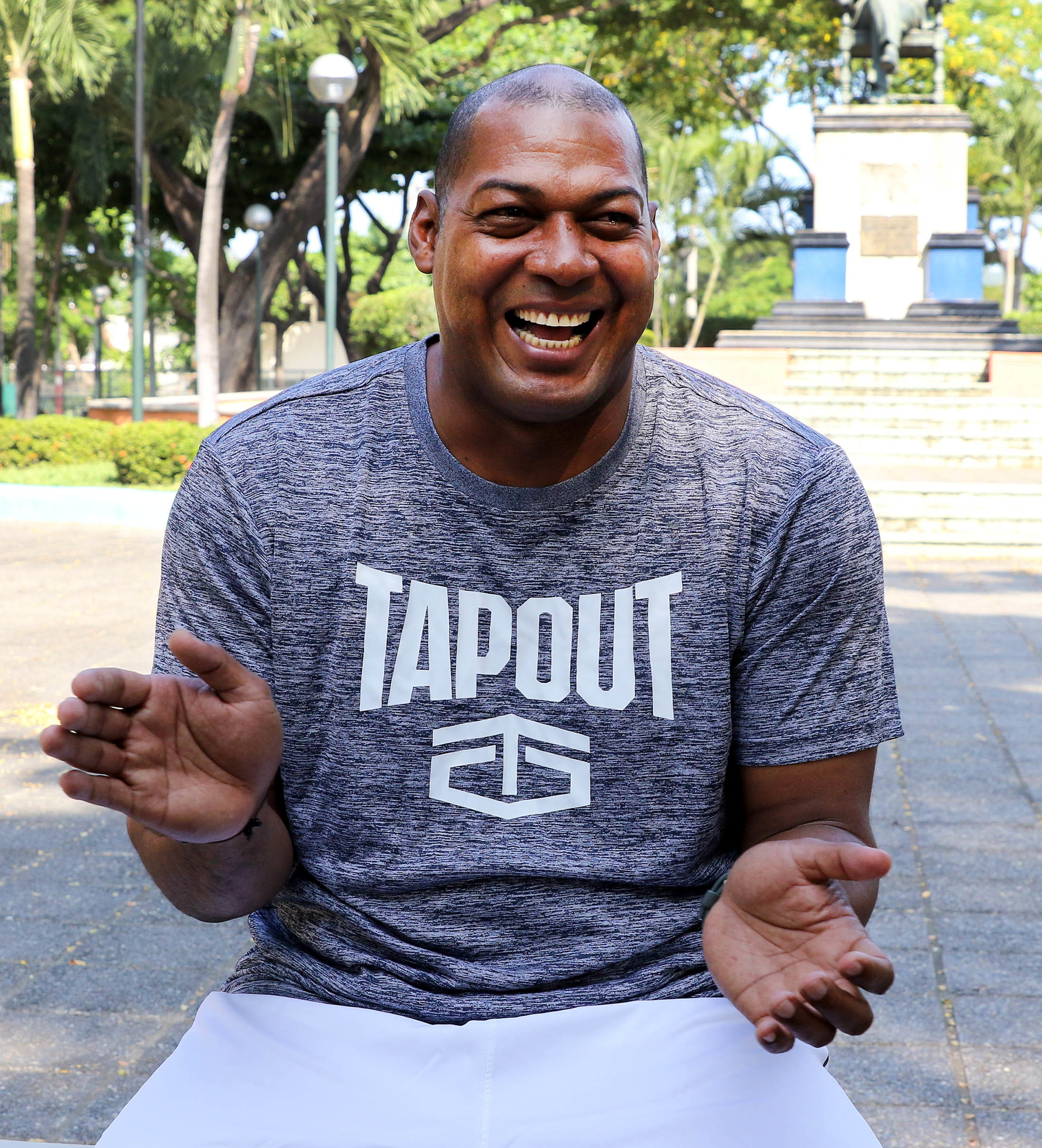
Eduardo Hurtado scored 21 goals for the Galaxy in their inaugural season.

Los Angeles was one of the original seven franchises awarded by MLS in 1994, and was owned by a group of investors led by banker Marc Rapaport. Former U.S. national team manager Lothar Osiander was hired as the first head coach of the Los Angeles franchise, which was named the Los Angeles Galaxy. The Galaxy had already acquired Mexican goalkeeper Jorge Campos, the league's first major international signing, and were also allocated American defender Dan Calichman, Salvadorian midfielder Mauricio Cienfuegos, and Ecuadorian striker Eduardo Hurtado. Osiander selected several experienced national team members in the general draft, including defenders Robin Fraser and Curt Onalfo, and midfielder Jorge Salcedo. The team also filled its roster by adding midfielders Greg Vanney and Chris Armas and forwards Guillermo Jara and Ante Razov from the collegiate and supplemental drafts in early March. National team winger Cobi Jones also signed with the Galaxy as a marquee player and left the team with 23 players on its roster, which was cut to 18 to fall under league regulations.

The Galaxy debuted to a crowd of 69,255 spectators at the Rose Bowl in Pasadena, California, and defeated the MetroStars 2–1. The team quickly took first place in the Western Conference by winning its first twelve matches, including the first eight without a shootout. The Galaxy led the league with 2.4 goals per game and 1.0 goals against average, with Eduardo Hurtado leading eleven goalscorers with seven goals. The winning streak was broken by the last-place Colorado Rapids on June 30, beginning a four-match losing streak that lasted through July and caused tension between the players and coaching staff.

Los Angeles alternated between wins and losses in early August before beginning a five-match losing streak that saw them fall to second place in the Western Conference behind the Kansas City Wiz. By the end of the month, the team had fallen to third place behind the Dallas Burn, but qualified for the playoffs ahead of Colorado and the San Jose Clash. Los Angeles climbed back into first place in mid-September with victories over San Jose and twice against Dallas to finish the regular season with a 19–13 record and 49 points atop the Western Conference and second overall in MLS. Hurtado finished second in scoring, with 21 goals and seven assists, and was named to the MLS Best XI alongside Marcos Cienfuegos and Robin Fraser.

The Galaxy faced the fourth-place San Jose Clash in the Conference Semifinals, who they won all four regular season matches against. The Clash hosted the first leg and won 1–0 on a headed goal by Tayt Ianni in the 36th minute, which came after several chances to score for the home side. Los Angeles tied the series at one match apiece with goals in the final six minutes by Fraser and Hurtado to win 2–0 in the second leg at the Rose Bowl. San Jose striker Eric Wynalda and defender Oscar Draguicevich were ejected late during the match after each being shown two yellow cards, and were suspended for the third leg. The Galaxy advanced to the Western Conference Final after a 2–0 victory in the third leg, with two goals scored in the first half by Hurtado and Cienfuegos from a controversial penalty kick called against Ben Iroha.

The Western Conference Final was played between the Galaxy and the third-seeded Kansas City Wiz, who had defeated the second-place Dallas Burn. Los Angeles hosted the first leg and won 2–1 with a volleyed goal by Chris Armas in the 48th minute and a 25-yard (23 m) shot by Greg Vanney in the 57th minute; Kansas City had responded to the first goal with an equalizer by Preki in the 52nd minute after a run through the Galaxy defense, but were unable to find a second goal. Preki opened the scoring in the 69th minute of the second leg with a penalty kick after being fouled in the box by Vanney, who went on to tie the match in the 77th minute after finishing a cross from Cienfuegos. The second leg remained tied after regulation time and overtime, with several disallowed goals called against Kansas City, and was decided in a penalty shootout from 35 yards (32 m). The shootout was won 3–1 by the Galaxy, with the winning shot by Robin Fraser in the fifth round, and the team advanced to the MLS Cup final.

=== Summary of results ===
Note: In all results below, the score of the finalist is given first (H: home; A: away). Playoffs were in best-of-three format with penalty shootout (SO) if scores were tied.

| D.C. United | | | | Round | Los Angeles Galaxy | | | |
|---|---|---|---|---|---|---|---|---|
| 2nd place in Eastern Conference: Pos. / Club / Pld. / W / SW / L / Pts.; 1 / Tampa Bay Mutiny (SS) / 32 / 20 / 1 / 12 / 58; 2 / D.C. United / 32 / 16 / 1 / 16 / 46; 3 / NY/NJ MetroStars / 32 / 15 / 3 / 17 / 39; 4 / Columbus Crew / 32 / 15 / 4 / 17 / 37; 5 / New England Revolution / 32 / 15 / 6 / 17 / 33; Source: MLS Qualified for playoffs Supporters' Shield winner | | | | Regular season | 1st place in Western Conference: Pos. / Club / Pld. / W / SW / L / Pts.; 1 / Los Angeles Galaxy / 32 / 19 / 4 / 13 / 49; 2 / Dallas Burn / 32 / 17 / 5 / 15 / 41; 3 / Kansas City Wiz / 32 / 17 / 5 / 15 / 41; 4 / San Jose Clash / 32 / 15 / 3 / 17 / 39; 5 / Colorado Rapids / 32 / 11 / 2 / 21 / 29; Source: MLS Qualified for playoffs | | | |
| Opponent | 1st leg | 2nd leg | 3rd leg | MLS Cup Playoffs | Opponent | 1st leg | 2nd leg | 3rd leg |
| NY/NJ MetroStars (2–1) | 2–2 (5–6 SO) (A) | 1–0 (H) | 2–1 (H) | Conference Semifinals | San Jose Clash (2–1) | 0–1 (A) | 2–0 (H) | 2–0 (H) |
| Tampa Bay Mutiny (2–0) | 4–1 (H) | 2–1 (A) | — | Conference Finals | Kansas City Wiz (2–0) | 2–1 (H) | 1–1 (3–1 SO) (A) | — |

== Broadcasting ==
The inaugural MLS Cup final was broadcast in the United States on ABC in English, with a broadcast team that was used by ESPN for its previous MLS matches during the regular season and playoffs. Phil Schoen was the play-by-play commentator, while Ty Keough and Bill McDermott provided color analysis; Roger Twibell was the studio anchor and was joined by Revolution defender Alexi Lalas, who also performed the national anthem with his electric guitar. The final reached an estimated audience of 1.6 million viewers, exceeding league expectations but falling short of other sports programming from that day. In local markets, the match had an estimated Nielsen rating of 2.4 in the Washington D.C. metropolitan area and 3.3 in Greater Los Angeles.

== Match ==
=== Summary ===
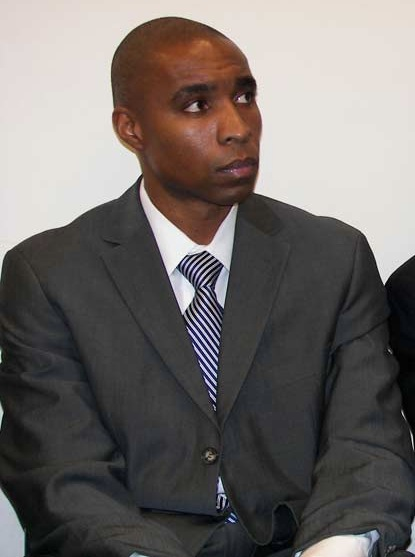
Eddie Pope scored the winning golden goal in the 94th minute

A nor'easter swept through New England following Hurricane Lili, bringing winds gusting at 30 to 50 miles per hour (48 to 80 km/h) and a rainstorm that inundated the field ahead of the match, which weighed down the tarp covering the field and created several shallow puddles. The weather caused league officials to consider cancellation or postponement of the MLS Cup final, but the lack of lightning allowed the match to continue as planned, kicking off with a temperature of 54 °F (12 °C). The storm also caused the cancellation of Major League Baseball's World Series opening game, which was being played on the same night in New York City. A total of 42,368 tickets were sold before the match, but only 34,643 spectators were counted in attendance, including approximately 5,000 to 7,000 United fans and supporters' group members who traveled from Washington, D.C. The match also attracted international attention, resulting in an overfilled press box that was cleared out by the fire marshal for a potential capacity code violation.

Both teams fielded most of their regular players, with the exception of Los Angeles captain Dan Calichman, who was suspended for yellow card accumulation during the playoffs. The Galaxy kicked off the match and had early control of possession, which they leveraged into several attacking chances. The opening goal of the final was scored in the fifth minute by Eduardo Hurtado, who headed a cross from Mauricio Cienfuegos on the right wing. Hurtado celebrated by sliding stomach-first with his teammates onto the waterlogged pitch. D.C. gained more possession of the ball during the remainder of the first half while looking for an equalizing goal, while Los Angeles switched to counter-attacking plays. Several shots towards goal from United, including a chance for Richie Williams in the 11th minute, missed the target or were saved by Jorge Campos.

The Galaxy continued to have the most scoring chances early in the second half and took a 2–0 lead in the 56th minute as Chris Armas dribbled past four defenders to make a left-footed shot from 16 yards (15 m). Weather conditions worsened as the match went on, with passes and other balls stopped by the water-logged field and higher winds. D.C. United coach Bruce Arena brought on two midfielders, Tony Sanneh and Shawn Medved, midway through the second half who helped shift momentum in the team's favor. Sanneh scored D.C.'s first goal in the 73rd minute, heading in a free kick that was won by Jaime Moreno and taken by Marco Etcheverry from 40 yards (37 m). Los Angeles coach Lothar Osiander responded by sending on two of his own substitutes, forward Ante Razov and defender Curt Onalfo, but the team was unable to extend its lead after Cobi Jones hit the crossbar with a chipped shot in the 78th minute.

Moreno won a second free kick near the penalty area in the 81st minute, setting up another shot taken by Etcheverry. Jorge Campos saved the free kick with a punch and a follow-up shot by Medved, but was unable to keep the rebound from Medved, who scored the tying goal from 8 yards (24 ft). After several attempts by various D.C. players to score a winning goal, the match reached the end of regulation time and proceeded into sudden death overtime. The Galaxy were unable to capitalize on several chances early in overtime before conceding a corner kick to D.C. United in the 94th minute. Etcheverry took the corner kick, which was redirected into the goal by defender Eddie Pope in the 6-yard (5.5 m) box, clinching a 3–2 victory for D.C. United. Pope celebrated the championship-winning golden goal by diving into the field before being mobbed by his teammates. For his three assists, Etcheverry was named the MLS Cup Most Valuable Player.

=== Details ===
October 20, 1996

| D.C. United | 3–2 (OT) | Los Angeles Galaxy |
|---|---|---|
| Sanneh 73'; Medved 81'; Pope 94' | Report | Hurtado 5'; Armas 56' |

Foxboro Stadium, Foxborough, Massachusetts, US
Attendance: 34,643
Referee: Esse Baharmast

| D.C. United | Los Angeles Galaxy |

| GK | 2 | (United States) Mark Simpson |
| DF | 4 | (United States) Clint Peay | (yellow card) 53' |
| DF | 23 | (United States) Eddie Pope |
| DF | 12 | (United States) Jeff Agoos |
| DF | 11 | (Argentina) Mario Gori | | (substituted off) 70' |
| MF | 16 | (United States) Richie Williams |
| MF | 19 | (United States) John Maessner | | (substituted off) 59' |
| MF | 6 | (United States) John Harkes (c) |
| MF | 10 | (Bolivia) Marco Etcheverry | (yellow card) 39' |
| FW | 9 | (Bolivia) Jaime Moreno |
| FW | 21 | (El Salvador) Raúl Díaz Arce |
Substitutes:
| MF | 7 | (United States) Tony Sanneh | | (substituted on) 59' |
| MF | 13 | (United States) Shawn Medved | | (substituted on) 70' |
Head coach:
(United States) Bruce Arena

| GK | 9 | (Mexico) Jorge Campos |
| DF | 19 | (Iran) Arash Noamouz | (yellow card) 74' |
| DF | 3 | (United States) Mark Semioli |
| DF | 4 | (United States) Robin Fraser (c) |
| DF | 18 | (United States) Greg Vanney |
| MF | 14 | (United States) Chris Armas |
| MF | 5 | (United States) Jorge Salcedo | | (substituted off) 77' |
| MF | 10 | (El Salvador) Mauricio Cienfuegos |
| MF | 13 | (United States) Cobi Jones |
| FW | 11 | (United States) Harut Karapetyan | | (substituted off) 75' |
| FW | 29 | (Ecuador) Eduardo Hurtado | (yellow card) 41' |
Substitutes:
| DF | 20 | (United States) Curt Onalfo | | (substituted on) 77' |
| FW | 7 | (United States) Ante Razov | | (substituted on) 75' |
Head coach:
(Germany) Lothar Osiander

MLS Cup Most Valuable Player:
Marco Etcheverry (D.C. United)

Assistant referees:
(United States) Scott Olson
(United States) Paul Tamberino
Fourth official:
(United States) Brian Hall

Match rules

- 90 minutes of regulation time with a countdown clock.
- Two 15-minute periods of extra time with golden goals to decide a winner.
- Penalty shootout from 35 yards if scores still tied.
- Maximum of three substitutions.

== Post-match ==
The match was called "a great exclamation point on an incredible season" by league commissioner Doug Logan, despite the weather conditions. The winning D.C. United players celebrated on the field for 30 minutes and returned the following day to a welcome by 1,000 fans at Reagan National Airport. D.C. went on to complete the "double" by winning a second trophy, the 1996 U.S. Open Cup, a week later at RFK Memorial Stadium by defeating the Rochester Raging Rhinos of the second-division A-League by a score of 3–0. D.C. United returned as MLS Cup finalists in the following three seasons, winning two more championships in 1997 and 1999, the latter of which was a rematch against the Galaxy in Foxborough.

D.C. and Los Angeles qualified as the U.S. representatives for the 1997 CONCACAF Champions' Cup, which was primarily hosted at RFK Memorial Stadium in Washington, D.C. The Galaxy played Santos Laguna in the qualifying playoffs and won 4–1 to earn a berth in the quarterfinals alongside D.C. United. Both teams defeated their quarterfinals opponent, with Los Angeles defeating Salvadorian club C.D. Luis Ángel Firpo 2–0 and hosts D.C. winning 1–0 against United Petrotrin of Trinidad and Tobago. The Galaxy then met D.C. United in the semifinals and won 1–0, the lone goal scored by Cobi Jones in the tenth minute, but were defeated 5–3 in the final by Cruz Azul, who won their fifth Champions' Cup.
