= San Jose Clash v D.C. United (April 1996) =

San Jose Clash v. D.C. United
- Event: 1996 Major League Soccer season
San Jose Clash	D.C. United
1	0
- Date: April 6, 1996
- Venue: Spartan Stadium, San Jose, California
- Referee: Esse Baharmast
- Attendance: 31,683
- Weather: 85 °F (29 °C)

On April 6, 1996, the San Jose Clash and D.C. United contested a Major League Soccer regular season match to open the 1996 Major League Soccer season. The match was the first played in the league's history. The Clash hosted United at Spartan Stadium, located on the campus of San Jose State University, to a crowd of 31,683. A late 88th-minute goal by Eric Wynalda gave the Clash their first ever victory in franchise history. (Note: This excludes the 1974–1988 edition of the San Jose Earthquakes)

== Match ==
=== Summary ===
The match was attended by a sellout crowd of 31,683, including FIFA president João Havelange and Univision commentator Andrés Cantor.

=== Details ===
April 4, 1996

San Jose Clash	1–0	D.C. United
Wynalda 88'	Report

Spartan Stadium
San Jose, California
Attendance: 34,643
Referee: Esse Baharmast

San Jose Clash	D.C. United

Assistant referees:
(United States) Levon Baladjanian
(United States) Reggie Rutty
Fourth official:
(United States) Joe Pimentel

Man-of-the Match:
Eric Wynalda (San Jose Clash)

== Aftermath ==
The loss prompted a four-match losing skid for United, before they finally won their first match on May 1, 1996, against Dallas Burn, but subsequently lost two more matches. However, United was able to overcome the early deficit record of 2–7 and finished the season 16–16, qualifying United for the MLS Cup Playoffs. United would eventually end up winning MLS Cup '96 against LA Galaxy, a team that eventually became a bitter rival of the Clash, and the team that actually eliminated San Jose from the playoffs. The MLS Cup victory sparked a remarkable dynasty run from United, who would reach every single MLS Cup final until 2000, winning three in the late 1990s. Further, United won the U.S. Open Cup that season completing the double. To date, United have earned 13 major titles, the most in MLS, and the second most of any American soccer club.

San Jose lost their next three matches, two in penalty shootouts, before winning another match. The Clash, despite having a sub .500 record of 12–17 earned the last seed in the Western Conference to qualify for the playoffs. The Clash lost a best-of-three series to the Galaxy in the first round of the postseason, losing two games to one. Wynalda would make 56 more league appearances for San Jose, amassing 20 more goals with the club, before having shorter spells with Club León, New England Revolution, Miami Fusion and Chicago Fire before retiring in 2001.

As part of the 20th anniversary of the match, a re-match between the San Jose Earthquakes (the successors to the Clash) and D.C. United was played on April 2, 2016, at Avaya Stadium in San Jose, California; the match ended in a 1–1 draw.

On April 6, 2025, a 30th anniversary match was played.
