= Kris Kelderman =

American soccer player (born 1968)

Personal information
- Date of birth: December 10, 1968 (age 57)
- Place of birth: Neenah, Wisconsin, United States
- Height: 6 ft 1 in (1.85 m)
- Position: Defender

College career
Years	Team	Apps	(Gls)
1987–1990	Virginia Cavaliers		

Senior career*
Years	Team	Apps	(Gls)
1990–1991	Baltimore Blast (indoor)	26	(2)
1992–1995	Buffalo Blizzard (indoor)	102	(32)
1994–1995	Milwaukee Rampage		
1995–1996	Tampa Bay Terror (indoor)	22	(3)
1996	St. Louis Ambush (indoor)	11	(3)
1996–1997	D.C. United	42	(3)
1998	Miami Fusion	21	(0)
1999	New England Revolution	18	(0)
2000–2001	Milwaukee Wave (indoor)	8	(0)
2000	Milwaukee Rampage		
2001	Milwaukee Bavarians		

International career
- United States U-16

Managerial career
- 2000: Wisconsin Rebels
- 2004–2006: D.C. United U-17
- 2005–2007: George Mason University (assistant)
- 2007–2009: Kansas City Wizards (assistant)
- 2010–2011: D.C. United (assistant)
- 2011: Green Bay Phoenix
- 2012–: Milwaukee Panthers
- * Club domestic league appearances and goals

Kris Kelderman (born December 10, 1968) is an American soccer coach and former player who is the head coach for the Milwaukee Panthers men's soccer team. A defender, he was a member of the U.S. team at the 1985 FIFA U-16 World Championship. He played professionally both indoors and out, including four seasons in Major League Soccer and was an assistant coach for D.C. United.

== Youth ==
Kelderman was born in Neenah, Wisconsin. He learned the game from his father, Harry Kelderman, who was the head coach of Neenah High School soccer team, eventually playing for his father at Neenah from 1983 to 1987. While still in high school, Kelderman was selected for the U.S. U-16 national team which played in the 1985 FIFA U-16 World Championship. The U.S. went 1–2 in group play and did not qualify for the second round. Kelderman then attended the University of Virginia where he played on the men's soccer team from 1987 to 1990. In 1989, Kelderman and his team mates won the NCAA Division I championship. He was also a member of the U.S. soccer team at the 1991 World University Games.

== Professional ==
In 1991, both the Milwaukee Wave of the National Professional Soccer League and the Baltimore Blast of Major Soccer League drafted Kelderman. He signed with the Blast, but the team and league collapsed at the end of the 1991–1992 season. In 1992, he signed with the expansion Buffalo Blizzard of the National Professional Soccer League. He remained with the team through the end of the 1994–1995 season. In 1994, he signed with the Milwaukee Rampage of USISL, playing two seasons with them. In the fall of 1995, he moved to the Tampa Bay Terror of the NPSL before moving to the St. Louis Ambush for the end of the season. On February 7, 1996, D.C. United selected Kelderman in the 8th round (80th overall) in the 1996 MLS Inaugural Player Draft. Kelderman played forty-two games over two seasons with United, winning the 1996 and 1997 MLS Cup as well as the 1996 U.S. Open Cup. On November 6, 1997, the Miami Fusion selected Kelderman with the sixth pick in the 1997 MLS Expansion Draft. He played twenty-one games with the Fusion, but was waived on November 2, 1998. He then signed with the New England Revolution for the 1999 season. The Revs waived him on December 2, 1999. In February 2000, Kelderman signed a three-year contract with the Milwaukee Rampage and Milwaukee Wave. He played four games with the Wave at the end of the season, then four more at the beginning of the 2000–2001 season. In the summer of 2000, he played for the Rampage. He retired from playing professionally in the fall of 2000.

== Coach ==
Following his playing career, Kelderman has forged a successful coaching career. In 1995, he served as an assistant with his father at Neenah High School. In 2000, he coached the Wisconsin Rebels of the Premier Development League. In 2004, he was hired by D.C. United as head coach of the team's U-17 program. That same year, he was hired as the Technical Director of the Vienna Youth Soccer Club in Vienna, Virginia. In October 2005, he also became the assistant coach with the George Mason men's soccer coach. On December 21, 2007, he became an assistant coach with the Kansas City Wizards. In 2010, he followed coach Curt Onalfo to D.C. United, serving as an assistant coach for the 2010 season. New coach Ben Olsen did not retain Kelderman as a part of his staff.

In May 2011, he was named the head coach of the Green Bay Phoenix men's soccer team.

In May 2012, he was named the head coach of the Milwaukee Panther men's soccer team after serving one year at UW-Green Bay.
