= Said Fazlagić =

Bosnian footballer (born 1969)

Personal information
- Date of birth: 25 January 1969 (age 57)
- Place of birth: Sarajevo, SFR Yugoslavia
- Position: Left back

Youth career
- Sarajevo

Senior career*
Years	Team	Apps	(Gls)
- Sarajevo
- Željezničar
- Rovinj
- SC Pfullendorf
1996	D.C. United	2	(0)

International career
1995	Bosnia and Herzegovina	1	(0)
- * Club domestic league appearances and goals

Said Fazlagić (born 25 January 1969) is a Bosnian retired international footballer who played professionally in Europe and the United States as a left back.

== Club career ==
Fazlagić played in Europe for FK Sarajevo, FK Željezničar, NK Rovinj and SC Pfullendorf, before signing with D.C. United in the 1996 MLS Inaugural Player Draft. Fazlagić made two appearances for D.C. United in the 1996 MLS season. After suffering a serious injury, Fazlagić was forced to retire at age 27. Later he served in capacity of Director of Coaching for United 1996 Futbol Club, Louisville, Kentucky from 1997 until 2004.

== International career ==
He made his debut in Bosnia and Herzegovina's first ever official international game, a November 1995 friendly match away against Albania, coming on as a late substitute for Nedžad Fazlagić. It remained his sole international appearance.

== Administrative career ==
He served as Secretary General of the Olympic Committee of Bosnia and Herzegovina from 2014 to 2026, and acting Secretary General between 2009 and 2014. He also served as "Chef de Mission" at eight Olympic Games, and other international sports events such as Youth Olympic Games, Mediterranean Games and European Youth Olympic Festival.

Since 25 December 2009 until 2014, Fazlagić has served as the Director of Sport, International Relations and Capital Projects of the Olympic Committee of Bosnia and Herzegovina.

He has also served as a member of the European Olympic Committee (EOC) Marketing Commission for 3 consecutive mandates from 2018 to 2028, and EOC EYOF Commission from 2012 to 2018.

He was elected as the project coordinator for the reconstruction of the Sarajevo Winter Olympics Museum, and as a member of the executive committee of EYOF Sarajevo and East Sarajevo 2019.
