= Jeff Causey =

American soccer player (born 1971)

Personal information
- Date of birth: October 19, 1971 (age 55)
- Place of birth: Manassas, Virginia, United States
- Height: 6 ft 3 in (1.91 m)
- Position: Goalkeeper

College career
Years	Team	Apps	(Gls)
1990–1993	Virginia Cavaliers		

Senior career*
Years	Team	Apps	(Gls)
1994	Boston Storm		
1995	Richmond Kickers		
1996–1997	D.C. United	25	(0)
1997–2001	New England Revolution	89	(0)
1998	→ MLS Pro 40 (loan)	3	(0)

Managerial career
- 1995: University of Virginia (assistant)
- 2002–2003: University of Maryland (assistant)
- 2006: Boston Breakers (assistant)
- * Club domestic league appearances and goals

Jeff Causey (born October 19, 1971) is an American former professional soccer player. He played as a goalkeeper who spent six seasons in Major League Soccer. He later served as an assistant coach at the collegiate and professional levels.

== College soccer ==
Causey was born in Manassas, Virginia. He attended the University of Virginia where he played on the men's soccer team from 1990 to 1993. He was a member of the Cavaliers teams which won the 1991, 1992, and 1993 NCAA Championships, taking Tournament Defensive MVP in 1991. He was a 1993 third team All American, graduating that year with a bachelor's degree in history. He holds the school record for 88 saves in the 1990 season and is tied for third with 10 shutouts that season.

== Professional career ==
In 1994, Causey signed with the Boston Storm of the USISL. In 1994, he moved to the Richmond Kickers, winning the 1995 USISL Championship and US Open Cup Championship.

On February 6, 1996, the Kansas City Wiz selected Causey in the 5th round (46th overall) in the 1996 MLS Inaugural Player Draft. The team then traded him to D.C. United in exchange for Garth Lagerway and the first overall pick in the 1996 MLS College Draft. Causey played nineteen games with United in 1996 as the team won both the MLS Cup and Open Cup. He began the year with United, but was waived on June 27, 1997.

=== New England Revolution ===
In July 1997, New England Revolution starting goalkeeper Walter Zenga was placed on Injured Reserve with a knee injury. As a result, on July 16, 1997, New England signed Causey. Causey made his Revolution debut on August 9 in a 3-0 loss to the Colorado Rapids. He made six starts total for the Revolution until Zenga's return in September. In the 2000 New England Revolution season Causey led the team in games in goal (22). He would again lead the team in 2001. Causey was a part of the New England Revolution until April 2002 when he retired from playing professionally. Causey was actively involved in the community and in 2000 & 2001, he received the New York Life "Humanitarian of the Year" as well the 2001 Boston Sports Awards "Ron Burton Community Hero." In 2008, Causey was inducted into the New England Soccer Hall of Fame.

== Coaching career ==
In 1995, Causey served as an assistant coach with the University of Virginia’s soccer team. On May 7, 2002, the University of Maryland, College Park announced it had hired Causey as an assistant with the men's soccer team. In 2003, he was an assistant coach with the Boston Breakers in the WUSA. With the collapse of the WUSA, Causey went into the financial services sector with Smith Barney in Manchester, New Hampshire. At the present time he is a Certified Financial Planner with TIAA-CREF. On January 19, 2012, it was announced that Causey would be joining the New England Revolution broadcast team for the 2012 season. Causey is still involved in soccer, coaching youth teams and players in the Massachusetts and New Hampshire area.
