= Mario Gori =

Argentine footballer

Personal information
- Full name: Mario Jose Gori
- Date of birth: June 1, 1973 (age 53)
- Place of birth: Rosario, Argentina
- Height: 5 ft 7 in (1.70 m)
- Position: Midfielder

Senior career*
Years	Team	Apps	(Gls)
1993–1996	Rosario Central	28	(0)
1996–1998	D.C. United	45	(2)
1997	→ Richmond Kickers (loan)	1	(0)
1998	→ Richmond Kickers (loan)	1	(0)
1999	Miami Fusion	12	(0)
1999	New England Revolution	17	(0)
2000	Columbus Crew	25	(1)
2001–2002	Pittsburgh Riverhounds	34	(0)
- * Club domestic league appearances and goals

Mario José Gori (born 1 June 1973) is an Argentine former professional footballer who played as a midfielder. Gori played professionally in Argentina and in the United States.

In 1993, Gori joined Rosario Central. On March 4, 1996, D.C. United selected Gori in the first round (eighth overall) of the 1996 MLS Supplemental Draft. Gori spent three seasons in D.C., winning the 1996 and 1997 MLS Cup and the 1998 CONCACAF Champions' Cup. In December 1998, D.C. sent Gori and its second round selection in the 1999 MLS College Draft to the Miami Fusion for Miami's 1999 MLS College Draft second round pick and Miami's first round pick in the 2000 MLS SuperDraft. Gori began the season in Miam but was traded to the New England Revolution on June 23, 1999, in exchange for Edwin Gorter. In 2000, he finished his MLS career with the Columbus Crew. In February 2001, the Crew waived Gori in order to free up one of the three foreign player slots in order to sign Tenywa Bonseu.

Gori then moved to the Pittsburgh Riverhounds of the USL A-League. Gori made an immediate impact on the team in 2001, but injuries limited his time in 2002 and 2003. The Riverhounds released him during the 2003 preseason.
