= Arash Noamouz =

Iranian footballer

Personal information
- Full name: Arash Noamouz
- Date of birth: 6 June 1967 (age 59)
- Place of birth: Tehran, Imperial State of Iran
- Height: 6 ft 0 in (1.83 m)
- Position: Left midfielder

Senior career*
Years	Team	Apps	(Gls)
- Poora
	Pas	65	(12)
- Bahman
1995	Houston Hotshots (indoor)	24	(11)
1996–1997	Los Angeles Galaxy	12	(2)

International career
1989–1993	Iran	3	(0)
1992	Iran (futsal)	3	(1)
- * Club domestic league appearances and goals

Arash Noamouz (Persian: آرش نوآموز, born 6 June 1967) is an Iranian former footballer who played as a left midfielder for Poora, Pas, Bahman, Los Angeles Galaxy and the Iran national football team.

== Career ==
After spending most of his career playing in Iran, Noamouz joined Major League Soccer club Los Angeles Galaxy in 1996. He scored the club's second MLS goal. In 1992, he played in FIFA Futsal World Championship with Iran.

== Personal life ==
Noamouz lives in Houston, Texas with his wife Kristina Coffey and co-owns Hungry’s Café and Bistro. He is son of Nasser Noamouz, former head of Iranian Football Federation.
