= Mark Simpson (soccer) =

American soccer player (born 1966)

Personal information
- Date of birth: March 18, 1966 (age 60)
- Place of birth: Wilmington, OH, United States
- Height: 6 ft 1 in (1.85 m)
- Position: Goalkeeper

Youth career
- Eastern Illinois Panthers

Senior career*
Years	Team	Apps	(Gls)
1990	Orlando Lions		
1988–1995	Chicago Power (indoor)		
1994	Rockford Raptors		
1995	Dayton Dynamo (indoor)	12	(1)
1995–1996	Cincinnati Silverbacks (indoor)	15	(0)
1996–2001	D.C. United	53	(0)
1996–1997	Buffalo Blizzard (indoor)	13	(0)
1998	→ MLS Pro-40 (loan)	2	(0)

International career
1999	U.S. Futsal	1	(0)

Managerial career
- 2002: D.C. United (goalkeeper)
- 2003: Virginia Beach Mariners (assistant)
- 2004–2010: D.C. United (assistant)
- * Club domestic league appearances and goals

Mark Simpson (born March 18, 1966) is an American former soccer player and coach. A goalkeeper, he spent six seasons with D.C. United in Major League Soccer. He backstopped the team to the MLS Cup 1996. He also spent one season in the American Professional Soccer League, two in the USISL and six in the National Professional Soccer League. He earned one cap with the U.S. National Futsal Team in 1999. He was the Director of Soccer Operations for the planned North American Soccer League team Virginia Cavalry FC.

== Player ==
=== Youth ===
Simpson attended Eastern Illinois University where he played on the men's soccer team until 1988.

=== Professional ===
On June 17, 1988, the Chicago Sting selected Simpson in the third round (25th overall) of the Major Indoor Soccer League draft. The Sting folded a month later and the San Diego Sockers picked up Simpson in the July 1988 dispersal draft. The Sockers did not sign him and Simpson joined the Chicago Power of the American Indoor Soccer Association in October 1988. He played each winter indoor season with the Power until February 1995 when he was traded to the Dayton Dynamo for Jim Adams and future considerations. He finished the 1994–1995 season with Dayton. In 1990, Simpson spent a season outdoors with the Orlando Lions of the American Professional Soccer League. He had also spent the summer of 1994 with the expansion Rockford Raptors of the USISL. In the fall of 1995, Simpson joined the Cincinnati Silverbacks of NPSL.

He had attended the MLS Supplemental Combine, but went undrafted in 1996. Intending to play the summer with the Richmond Kickers, he received a call from D.C. head coach Bruce Arena asking if he wanted to join United. On April 19, 1996, the Silverbacks sent Simpson on loan to D.C. United of Major League Soccer. Although he began the season as a backup, he made fifteen regular season appearances at the end of the season and was Arena's keeper of choice for the playoffs. On October 20, 1996, he backstopped United to the MLS Championship.

Simpson returned to the indoor game for the 1996-1997 indoor season with the Buffalo Blizzard. Upon returning to DC United for the 1997 season, he tore his lateral meniscus thirteen games into the season. He had surgery to repair the damage, but his knee then became infected. This kept him from playing for nearly a year and a half. In 1998, he began his comeback, going on loan to the MLS Pro-40 team and playing two games with D.C. United waived him on October 30, 1998. He returned to playing full-time in 1999 with DC United. He remained with D.C. until his retirement on January 8, 2002.

=== Futsal ===
In 1999, he earned one cap with the U.S. National Futsal team.

== Coaching and administration ==
In 2002, Simpson was the goalkeeper coach for D.C. United and spent some time in the same role with the club's Super Y-League team. At the end of the 2002 season, he left the team for the Virginia Beach Mariners of the USL A-League. On January 19, 2004, Simpson returned to United as an assistant coach for goalkeeping, eventually becoming a full assistant coach with the club until 2010.

In November 2012, Simpson was announced as the Director of Soccer Operations for the new North American Soccer League expansion team, Virginia Cavalry FC.
