= Clint Peay =

American soccer coach and player (born 1973)

Personal information
- Full name: Clint Eastwood Peay
- Date of birth: September 16, 1973 (age 53)
- Place of birth: Columbia, Maryland, United States
- Height: 6 ft 0 in (1.83 m)
- Position: Defender

Team information
- Current team: New England Revolution (assistant coach)

College career
Years	Team	Apps	(Gls)
1991–1995	Virginia Cavaliers		

Senior career*
Years	Team	Apps	(Gls)
1996–1998	D.C. United	43	(1)
1998	Charleston Battery	8	(0)
1999–2000	D.C. United	5	(1)
1999	→ Maryland Mania (loan)	5	(0)
1999	→ Northern Virginia Royals (loan)	1	(0)

International career
1996	United States U23	3	(0)

Managerial career
- 2003: Georgetown Hoyas (assistant)
- 2004–2007: Davidson Wildcats (assistant)
- 2008–2009: George Mason Patriots (assistant)
- 2009–2012: Richmond Spiders
- 2016–2018: United States U14
- 2018: United States U15
- 2019: North Carolina FC (assistant)
- 2020–2023: New England Revolution II
- 2023: New England Revolution (interim)
- 2024–: New England Revolution (assistant)
- * Club domestic league appearances and goals

Clint Peay (born September 16, 1973, in Columbia, Maryland) is an American soccer coach and former player who is currently serving as an assistant coach of the MLS team New England Revolution. He was a regular on the U.S. junior national teams and U.S. Olympic team in the mid-1990s. He also spent several years with D.C. United in Major League Soccer.

== Youth ==
Peay grew up in Columbia, Maryland and attended Oakland Mills High School where he played on the boys' soccer team. After graduating from high school, he attended the University of Virginia where he was a defender on the men's soccer team from 1991 to 1995. During Peay's four seasons, the Cavaliers won the NCAA championship four consecutive years. Of note, Oakland Mills won the Maryland State Championship and was ranked #1 in the state at the end of Peay's senior year. In Peay's four years at the University of Virginia, his teams also won their respective championships, each time ending the year ranked #1. For his first two years with the D.C. United, his team won the MLS Championship. Finally in or about 2000, Peay's decade long run of season ending championships came to an end when the D.C. United did not successfully defend their MLS Championship. He did.

== Junior National and Olympic Teams ==
In 1993, Peay was the captain of the U.S. U-20 national team that competed at the U-20 World Cup. The U.S. went 1–1–1 in the first round, qualifying for the second round where the team fell to Brazil 3–0. 1995, Peay was a member of the U.S. team at the 1995 Pan American games. The U.S. went 0–3 and did not make the second round. That year Peay also was on the U.S. team at the World University Games. In 1996, Bruce Arena, who coached Peay at the University of Virginia, selected Peay for the U.S. soccer team at the 1996 Summer Olympics. The U.S. went 1–1–1, but failed to qualify for the second round. Peay played all three games as a central defender.

== Club career ==
Arena continued to turn to Peay when D.C. United of Major League Soccer (MLS) drafted him in the ninth round (90th overall) of the 1996 MLS Draft. In 1996, Peay saw time in twenty-four games, twenty-three, as United went to the MLS championship and the U.S. Open Cup title. Peay's playing dropped significantly as in 1997 as he started only eight games. In 1998, it fell further as he played only 394 minutes in six games before United waived Peay on June 30, 1998. When Peay became available, the Charleston Battery of the USL First Division, signed him. He then played eight games with the Battery in 1998. At the end of the season, the Battery traded Peay to the Maryland Mania for first round 1999 draft pick. However, on May 13, 1999, D.C. United signed Peay, ironically as a discovery player. In 1999, Peay saw even fewer minutes than in 1998, a total of only 241 in five games. Then, during the 2000 pre-season, he tore the anterior cruciate ligament in his left knee. While he attempted to work himself back into playing condition, he realized he could not and retired on November 8, 2000.

Following his retirement from playing professionally, Peay became United's broadcast announcer.

== Coaching ==
On January 27, 2003, Georgetown University hired Peay as an assistant coach. In 2004, he moved to Davidson College as an assistant coach to the men's soccer team. He held that position until 2008 when he moved to George Mason University as an assistant. After George Mason, he accepted the men's head coaching job at the University of Richmond, which he started effective February 1, 2009.

In July 2012, Peay resigned from the men's head coaching job at Richmond to accept a position with the USMNT. In February 2019, Peay joined the North Carolina FC staff as an assistant coach to Dave Sarachan.

On November 25, 2019, Peay was announced as the first ever head coach of the newly formed Revolution II, starting competition in the USL-League One in the 2020 season.

On September 12, 2023, Peay was announced as interim head coach of the New England Revolution, replacing Richie Williams who had been serving in the same role since August 1, 2023 when Bruce Arena was as placed on administrative leave by the team on amid allegations of "insensitive and inappropriate remarks". Peay recorded his first win as Revolution interim coach on September 30, 2023, in a 2–1 victory over Charlotte FC.

On December 19, 2023, the Revolution announced that it had appointed Caleb Porter as its head coach, taking over from Peay. On January 8, Peay was named as an assistant coach for the first team.

== Head coaching record ==
Team	from	to	W	D	L	Win%
Revolution II	September 11, 2018	October 14, 2023	39	20	37	40.63
New England Revolution	September 12, 2023	December 19, 2023	2	6	1	22.22
