= Esfandiar Baharmast =

Iranian-American football referee

Esfandiar "Esse" Baharmast
- Full name: Esfandiar Baharmast
- Born: 11 March 1954 (age 72); Iran
- Other occupation: FIFA Instructor, US Soccer Director of Officials

Domestic
Years	League	Role
1996–1998	Major League Soccer	Referee

International
Years	League	Role
1993–1998	FIFA listed	Referee

Esfandiar "Esse" Baharmast (born March 11, 1954) is a retired Iranian-American football referee best known for supervising two matches during the 1998 FIFA World Cup held in France.

== Career ==
At that tournament, he was briefly vilified for giving a late penalty to Norway in the dying minutes of their first-round game with Brazil, only to be vindicated the following day when a Swedish TV station released previously unseen TV footage from a new camera angle indisputably showing that he made the right call; Norway striker Tore André Flo did indeed have his jersey pulled by Brazil defender Júnior Baiano. The call was later selected by Referee Magazine as one of the "Best 18 Calls of All Time."

He continued his involvement in refereeing by becoming the Director of Officials for US Soccer in August 1998. He also officiated the first MLS match on April 6, 1996, between San Jose Clash & D.C. United. He refereed the inaugural MLS Cup in 1996, and was named MLS referee of the year in 1997. He has been a member of CONCACAF Referees' Committee since 2003 and a FIFA Instructor.

As a FIFA instructor, he has been involved in numerous tournaments, such as FIFA U-17 World Cup in Finland (2003), FIFA U-20 World Cups in Netherlands (2005) and Canada (2007), FIFA World Cup in Germany (2006) and Beijing Olympic Games in China (2008).

He worked for FIFA as a technical instructor in the Referee Assistance Program (FIFA RAP) and dealt with the instruction and preparation of the referees for the 2010 World Cup in South Africa. He also has served Colorado by being the director of referees.

Baharmast was inducted into the National Soccer Hall of Fame in 2022.

== See also ==
- MLS Referee of the Year Award
