= Steve Rammel =

American soccer player (born 1968)

Personal information
- Date of birth: April 20, 1968 (age 58)
- Place of birth: Bridgeton, New Jersey, U.S.
- Height: 5 ft 9 in (1.75 m)
- Position: Forward

Youth career
- 1982–1986: West Deptford Eagles

College career
Years	Team	Apps	(Gls)
1987–1990	Rutgers University		

Senior career*
Years	Team	Apps	(Gls)
1991	Penn-Jersey Spirit	7	(2)
1991–1992	SC Norderstedt		
1992–1993	Tus Celle		
1996	Washington Mustangs		
1996–1997	D.C. United	37	(15)
1997	Colorado Rapids	10	(0)
- German-Hungarians

Managerial career
- 1994–1996: UMass Minutemen (assistant)
- 1998–2001: UCLA Bruins (assistant)
- 2001–2005: Saint Mary's Gaels
- 2005–2006: Los Angeles Galaxy (assistant)
- 2007–2008: Santa Rosa United (executive director)
- 2013–: Orlando City Youth (executive director)
- * Club domestic league appearances and goals

Steve Rammel (born April 20, 1968) is an American retired soccer player who played as a forward. Rammel spent five seasons in the U.S. and German lower divisions before playing two seasons in Major League Soccer. After retiring from playing in 1997, he served for many years as both an assistant and head coach for both college and professional teams. He was previously the executive director for the West Florida Flames Futbol Club in Brandon, Florida.

== High school and college ==
Rammel attended West Deptford High School in New Jersey where he played for the school's boys soccer team. He helped lead the team to one New Jersey state championship, being named the 1986 Parade Magazine's National High School Player of the Year.

After high school, Rammel attended and played soccer for The University of Connecticut from 1987 to 1989. He then transferred to Rutgers University where he played for its men's soccer team for the 1989 and 1990 seasons. In 1989, Rutgers went to the NCAA Final Four and, in Rammel's senior year, the team made it to the championship game where it lost in penalty kicks to UCLA. Rammel was selected as a first team All American his senior year and was second behind Ken Snow in the voting for the 1990 Hermann Trophy. Rammel finished his career with the Scarlet Knights with 44 goals in 86 games In 1991, he graduated with a Bachelor's degree in Economics.

== Playing career ==
=== National team ===
In 1991, Rammel was called into the U.S. national team camp, but never made a game day roster. However, he did play for the B-team in the 1991 World University Games.

=== Penn-Jersey Spirit ===
In 1991, Rammel spent seven games, scoring two goals, with the Penn-Jersey Spirit of the American Professional Soccer League.

=== Germany ===
Rammel then moved to Europe where he played for German lower division clubs SC Norderstedt in 1991-1992 and Tus Celle in 1992–1993.

In 1994, Rammel returned to school at the University of Massachusetts Amherst where he earned a Master's degree in Business Administration in Finance in 1996. While studying, he also served as an assistant coach with the University of Massachusetts Amherst men's soccer team.

=== MLS ===
In 1996, Rammel joined the Washington Mustangs of the USISL. On April 19, 1996, D.C. United acquired Rammel on loan from the Mustangs. They were impressed enough that they purchased his contract on May 3, 1996. He became an All Star that season, scoring 17 regular season and play off goals. He also scored the first MLS hat trick in a May 15, 1996 victory over the Columbus Crew.

His scoring touch deserted him in 1997 and after eleven games the team traded him on July 3, 1997, to the Colorado Rapids for Roy Wegerle. Rammel played the rest of the 1997 season with Colorado, never scoring a goal for the team. However, he did play 90 minutes in the championship game as the Rapids lost to United. On March 5, 1998, during the pre-season, the Rapids traded Rammel to the MetroStars for a 1999 first round supplemental draft choice. Two weeks later Rammel announced he planned to retire from playing and join UCLA as an assistant men's soccer coach. The MetroStars were allowed to keep their draft pick.

== Coaching career ==
Rammel had already re-entered the coaching ranks while with Colorado, becoming the assistant director of Coaching for the Colorado Rush youth club. However, his move to UCLA began a seven-year period where he devoted himself to coaching. Rammel was an assistant at UCLA for three years before moving to Saint Mary's College of California as the head men's soccer coach. He joined the team on March 29, 2001, and left five seasons later with a 32-54-10 record. On December 15, 2005, he left St. Mary's to become an assistant coach under Steve Sampson at the Los Angeles Galaxy. When Sampson was fired, the Galaxy purged the coaching ranks, firing Rammel in June 2006.

On January 26, 2007, the Santa Rosa United youth club hired Rammel as the club's executive director.

== Honors ==
Individual

- MLS All-Star: 1996
