= Richie Williams =

American soccer player (born 1970)

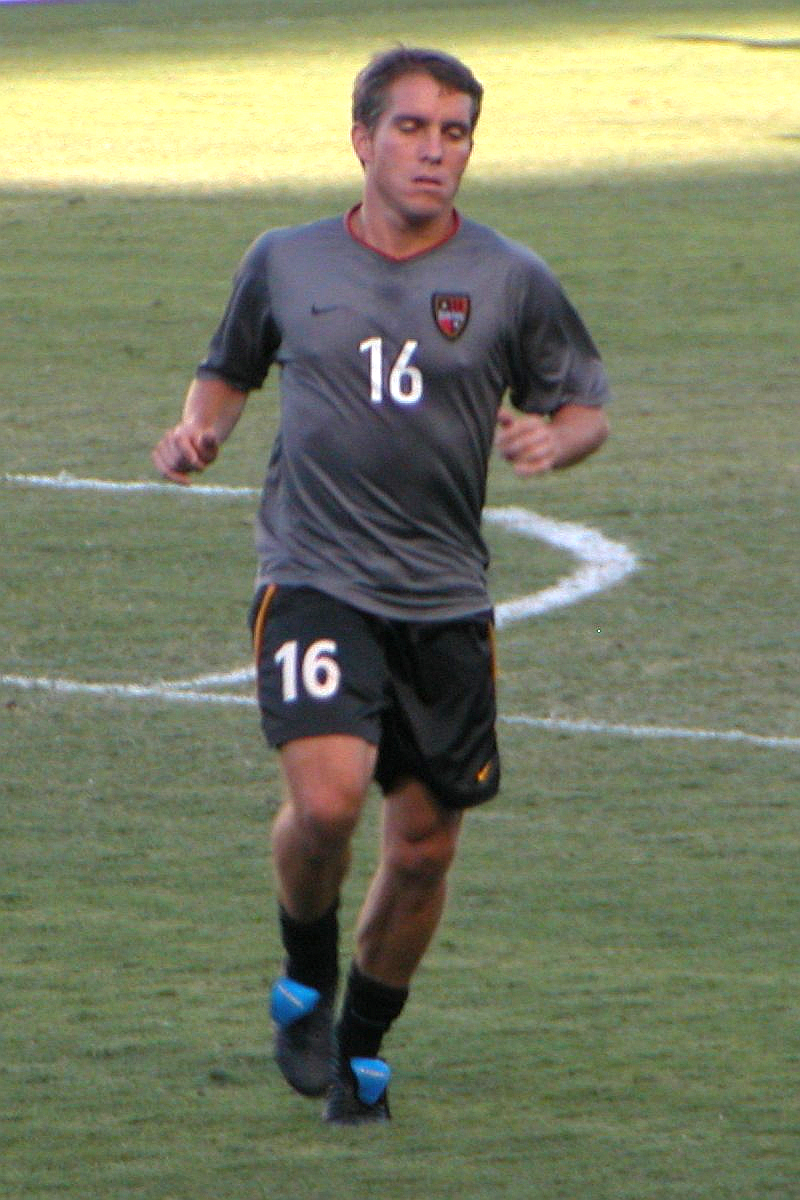
- Williams in 2003

Personal information
- Full name: Richard Williams
- Date of birth: June 3, 1970 (age 56)
- Place of birth: Middletown Township, New Jersey, United States
- Height: 5 ft 5 in (1.65 m)
- Position: Midfielder

College career
Years	Team	Apps	(Gls)
1988–1991	Virginia Cavaliers		

Senior career*
Years	Team	Apps	(Gls)
1992–1993	Buffalo Blizzard (indoor)	30	(10)
1993	Richmond Kickers		
1993–1994	Ayr United		
1994–1995	Richmond Kickers		
1996–2000	D.C. United	143	(8)
2001	MetroStars	21	(0)
2002	D.C. United	26	(0)
2003	MetroStars	26	(0)
2004–2005	Richmond Kickers	53	(2)
Total		299	(20)

International career
1989	United States U20		
1992	United States U23		
1998–2002	United States	20	(0)

Managerial career
- 2005–2006: Virginia Cavaliers (assistant)
- 2006–2011: New York Red Bulls (assistant)
- 2006: New York Red Bulls (interim)
- 2009: New York Red Bulls (interim)
- 2011–2012: United States U18
- 2012–2015: United States U17
- 2015–2016: Real Salt Lake (assistant)
- 2017–2018: United States (assistant)
- 2019: Loudoun United
- 2019–2023: New England Revolution (assistant)
- 2023: New England Revolution (interim head coach)
- 2024–2025: New England Revolution II
Medal record
Representing United States
Winner	CONCACAF Gold Cup	2002
Men's Soccer
- * Club domestic league appearances and goals

Richard "Richie" Williams (born June 3, 1970) is an American soccer coach and former player.

Known for his diminutive height and his dogged tackling, Williams spent the vast majority of his playing career in the United States, playing one season in the National Professional Soccer League, two in USISL, two in the USL A-League, and eight in Major League Soccer, most notably for D.C. United. He also earned 20 caps for the United States national team.

As a player, he won national championships at the youth (Union NJ Lancers, McGuire Cup U-19 in 1988), college (University of Virginia, NCAA Champions in 1989, 1991 and 1992), and professional (DC United, MLS Cups in 1996, 1997 and 1999) levels.

Since the end of his playing career, Williams has been involved in coaching, including as head coach of the U.S. Under-17 Men's National Team and as an assistant coach in Major League Soccer for the New York Red Bulls and the New England Revolution.

== Club career ==
=== Early career ===
Williams was born in Middletown Township, New Jersey and attended Mater Dei High School. Williams' career has been closely tied to Bruce Arena, former coach of the United States men's national team. Arena first coached Williams at the University of Virginia. The two parted ways after Williams graduated. In 1992, Williams signed with Buffalo Blizzard in the National Professional Soccer League. He played thirty games for the Blizzard during the 1992-1993 winter indoor season. In the spring of 1993, he signed with the Richmond Kickers of the USISL. That fall, he moved to Ayr United in Scottish Football League but then came back to the United States, signing with the Richmond Kickers of the USISL in 1994. Williams played two seasons with the Kickers, helping them to the 1995 U.S. Open Cup and USISL titles.

=== Major League Soccer ===
In February 1996, Williams was drafted by D.C. United head coach Bruce Arena in the fourth round of the 1996 MLS Inaugural Player Draft. Making up for his height with his ferocious shadowing of the opponent's top playmaker, he became an integral member of the early DC teams, helping them to three MLS Cup titles.

Williams was traded to MetroStars for Mike Ammann in 2001, spent a year there and was sent back to D.C. for Brian Kamler. His MLS career ended with the Metros in a trade with Eddie Pope and Jaime Moreno for Mike Petke, a draft pick, and an allocation before the 2003 season. Williams tallied just eight goals and added 33 assists in 216 regular season games in MLS (plus two goals and four assists in 26 playoff games).

Williams signed with his original American team Richmond Kickers which then played in the USL A-League, prior to the 2004 season, but left the club in September 2005 after disagreements with the coach Leigh Cowlishaw, and retired from playing shortly thereafter.

== International career ==
Williams earned his first cap for the United States on November 6, 1998, against Australia, and went on to appear 20 times for the national team.

== Coaching career ==
Williams spent several years as an assistant coach at his alma mater, the University of Virginia, before being named an assistant coach with the MetroStars in January 2006. In June 2006, Williams was named interim head coach of the re-branded New York Red Bulls, and went back as assistant following former United States men's national soccer team head coach Bruce Arena's appointment with the club. He remained as the club's top assistant coach, until he was once again called on to serve as the club's interim coach replacing Juan Carlos Osorio for the remaining eight matches of the 2009 season. Williams was retained by Red Bulls as an assistant coach for the 2010 season before being abruptly fired just three weeks before the start of the 2011 MLS season.

In October 2011, Williams was hired as the head coach of the U-18 national team. Three months later he was named head coach of the United States men's national under-17 soccer team. After the 2015 FIFA U-17 World Cup, Williams departed the program.

In January 2019, Williams was hired as the head coach of Loudoun United FC in the USL Championship. He left the team on May 30 to take a job as an assistant coach for the New England Revolution.

In August 2020 during the “MLS is Back Tournament” in a COVID-shortened season, Williams assumed head coaching duties of the New England Revolution for three games (a win and a tie, extending the team's unbeaten streak to eight games) while Bruce Arena served a temporary suspension.

On August 1, 2023, the New England Revolution announced that Bruce Arena was placed on administrative leave amid allegations of "insensitive and inappropriate remarks" and that Williams would act as interim head coach pending a related league investigation. On September 12, 2023, it was announced that Clint Peay would be replacing Williams as interim head coach.

Williams was named head coach of the Revolution's MLS Next Pro squad New England Revolution II on January 17, 2024.

== Managerial statistics ==
Team	From	To	Record						
Team	From	To	P	W	D	L	GF	GA	Win %
New York Red Bulls (interim coach)	June 2006	August 2006	8	3	2	3	8	7	37.50
New York Red Bulls (interim coach)	August 2009	October 2009	8	3	2	3	11	8	37.50
Loudoun United FC	January 28, 2019	May 30, 2019	9	2	4	3	11	13	22.22
New England Revolution	August 1, 2023	September 13, 2023	6	1	4	1	7	7	16.67
Total			31	9	12	10	37	35	29.03

== Honors ==
D.C. United

- MLS Cup: 1996, 1997, 1999
- MLS Supporters' Shield: 1997, 1999
- U.S. Open Cup: 1996
- CONCACAF Champions' Cup: 1998
- InterAmerican Cup: 1998

Richmond Kickers

- USISL Premier League Champions: 1995
- US Open Cup Champions: 1995
- James River Cup: 2004, 2005

United States

- CONCACAF Gold Cup: 2002

Individual

- MLS All-Star: 1997, 1999
