= Tony Sanneh =

American soccer player

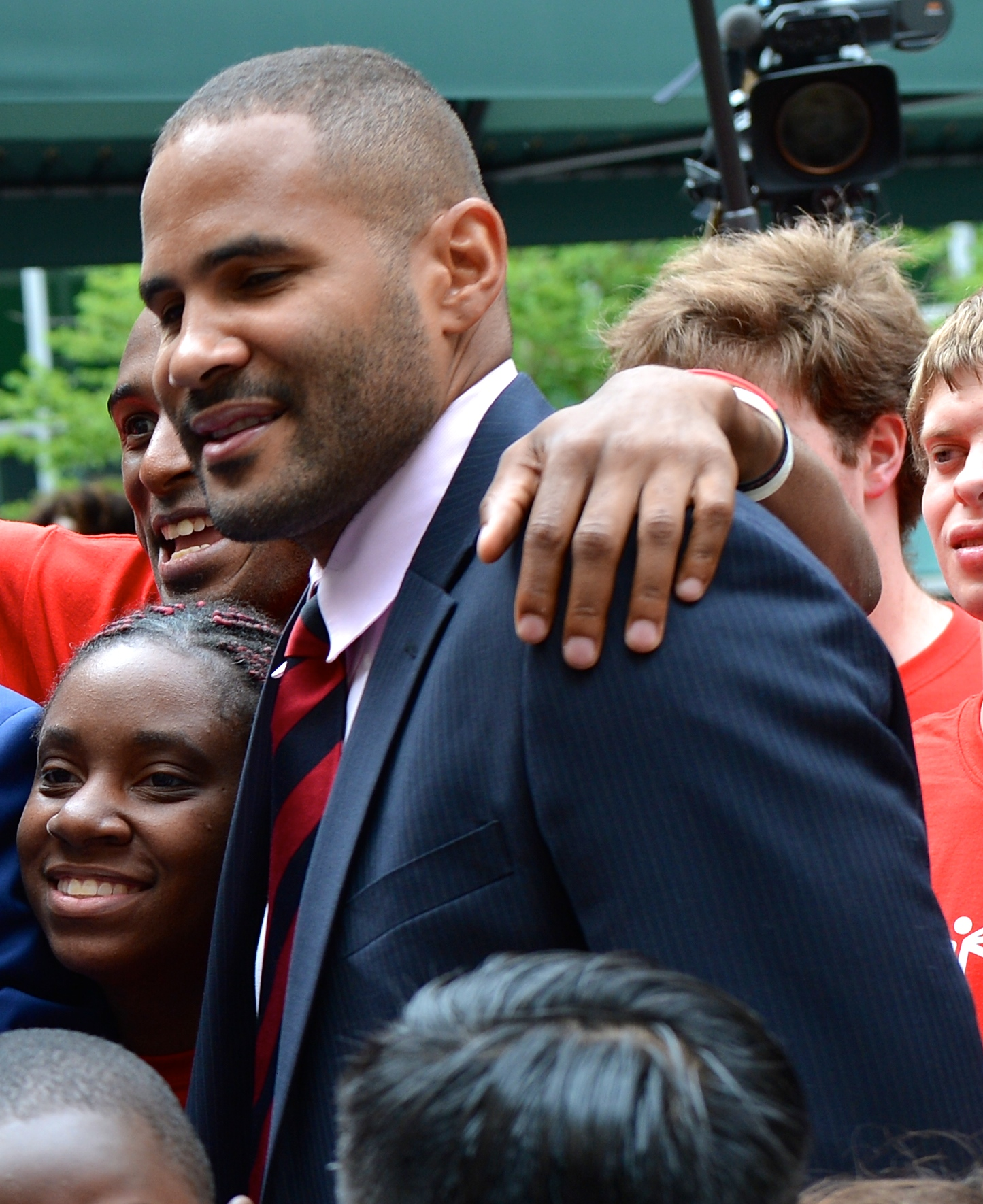
- Sanneh in 2014

Personal information
- Full name: Anthony Harry Sanneh
- Date of birth: June 1, 1971 (age 55)
- Place of birth: St. Paul, Minnesota, United States
- Height: 6 ft 2 in (1.88 m)
- Positions: Defender; midfielder

College career
Years	Team	Apps	(Gls)
1990–1993	Milwaukee Panthers		

Senior career*
Years	Team	Apps	(Gls)
1994	Milwaukee Rampage	18	(14)
1994–1996	Chicago Power (indoor)	43	(31)
1995–1996	Minnesota Thunder	24	(18)
1995–1996	Milwaukee Wave (indoor)	16	(6)
1996–1998	D.C. United	86	(20)
1999–2001	Hertha BSC	31	(1)
2001–2004	1. FC Nürnberg	52	(5)
2004	Columbus Crew	8	(2)
2005–2006	Chicago Fire	31	(0)
2007	Minnesota Thunder	2	(0)
2007	Colorado Rapids	9	(0)
2009	Los Angeles Galaxy	13	(0)
Total		333	(97)

International career
1997–2005	United States	43	(3)
Medal record
Representing United States
Winner	CONCACAF Gold Cup	2005
Men's Soccer
- * Club domestic league appearances and goals

Anthony Harry Sanneh (born June 1, 1971) is an American former professional soccer player who played as a defender or midfielder.

== Club career ==
=== Youth and college ===
Tony Sanneh was born in Saint Paul, Minnesota to an African father from Gambia and an American mother from Wisconsin. He attended the St. Paul Academy and Summit School and played for the local soccer team, St. Paul Blackhawks. He graduated in 1990 having been selected twice to the All State team. He went on to play college soccer for the NCAA Division I Milwaukee Panthers, where, as a striker, he became the school's all-time scoring leader, with 53 goals and 32 assists from 1990 to 1993. He was named an NCAA Second-Team All-American in 1993.

=== Professional ===
In 1994, his first year out of college, Sanneh played with USISL's Milwaukee Rampage, where he scored 14 goals and 14 assists while teaming up with Brian McBride. His partnership with McBride was highlighted by a goal that the latter scored during the opening 2002 World Cup match against Portugal, which originated from a cross by Sanneh. During the winter 1994 season, Sanneh joined the indoor soccer Chicago Power of the National Professional Soccer League (NPSL). He played 34 games, scoring 27 goals in the 1994–95 season. He also played goalkeeper in four games for a total of 79:15 minutes. In the 1995–96 indoor season, he played in only nine games, scoring four goals, but also played 4:19 minutes as a goalkeeper. In 1995, he played with a former Milwaukee Panthers teammate, Manny Lagos, on the Minnesota Thunder, amassing 18 goals and 22 assists with the team. He also played the 1995–96 indoor season with the Milwaukee Wave. In 1996, midway through the inaugural MLS season, Sanneh was signed by D.C. United. Originally a forward, Tony played a variety of positions for United, mostly at right midfield. He went on to score goals in the first two MLS Cups, leading D.C. to consecutive titles. Sanneh ended his original MLS stay after the 1998 season, signing with Bundesliga club Hertha BSC in January 1999.

Sanneh spent the next three years with Hertha, where he was a starter when healthy. His playing time was limited at times due to many injuries and a national team tug of war. He scored just one goal in league play, and is remembered for assisting on Ali Daei's first UEFA Champions League goal in a 2–1 victory over Chelsea. He transferred to 1. FC Nürnberg in 2001, where he played nearly every game the first year and a half leading the back line until he sustained a back injury that kept him out of action for 13 months. During his injury layoff Nürnberg was demoted to the second league. Upon his return Sanneh started the last seven games, winning five in a row, to give Nürnberg promotion and the second Bundesliga crown. He tallied a total of five goals. In 2004, he came back to MLS, signing with the Columbus Crew, to play alongside long-time friend, college and Thunder teammate Manny Lagos. The Crew finished the season with the league's best record and a 19-game unbeaten streak but lost in the playoffs after they missed two penalty kicks, one of which marred Sanneh's time there. Sanneh was traded following the end of the season to the Chicago Fire, in exchange for Ante Razov and part of an allocation. He played out the 2006 season assisting on the final goal of the Fire's 3–1 Open Cup win over the L.A. Galaxy. Sanneh's MLS league totals stand at 16 goals and 27 assists.

However, following the 2006 season, Sanneh and the Fire failed to reach a new agreement on his contract, prompting his release from the team. On July 24, 2007, USL First Division team Minnesota Thunder announced that they had signed Sanneh. The Colorado Rapids then acquired his rights from the Fire. He made his debut for the Rapids on August 16, 2007, against the New England Revolution at Dick's Sporting Goods Park. He played in 10 out of their final 12 games but did not agree to terms the following season.

After sitting out the 2008 season, he signed with Los Angeles Galaxy in February 2009. He made 13 appearances with the Western Conference champions (including five starts) but struggled with injuries the latter half of the season and was not invited to 2010's training camp.

== International career ==
Sanneh made his debut for the United States national team on January 29, 1997, in a 2–1 loss to China but failed to make Steve Sampson's final squad and was left out of the 1998 FIFA World Cup in France.

Sanneh then had very good seasons from there on out, enough to impress new U.S. coach Bruce Arena scoring his first international goal in a shock 3–0 win over Germany. Eventually, he became an important part of the team by the time the 2002 FIFA World Cup came around and was one of the US best players in the tournament, playing every minute of every game. In the US first game of the tournament, a 3–2 upset of Portugal, his precise cross from the right side of the field provided an assist to Brian McBride's goal. He was also instrumental, both defensively and offensively, in the US narrow 1–0 loss to Germany in the quarterfinals, barely missing an equalizing goal on two occasions in the 47th and 89th minute.

After the 2002 FIFA World Cup, Sanneh was rarely picked due to injury and an influx of young talent into the national team pool. However, after playing impressively for the Columbus Crew and Chicago Fire in MLS, he was recalled for the 2005 CONCACAF Gold Cup, starting in group games against Cuba and Costa Rica. The US later won the tournament upon beating Panama in the final. Following the tournament he was never called back into the national team and Sanneh finished his career for the US national team with three goals in 43 appearances.

=== International goals ===
Scores and results list the United States' goal tally first, score column indicates score after each Sanneh goal.

List of international goals scored by Tony Sanneh
No.	Date	Venue	Opponent	Score	Result	Competition
1	February 6, 1999	Alltel Stadium, Jacksonville, United States	Germany	2–0	3–0	Friendly
2	May 12, 2002	RFK Memorial Stadium, Washington, D.C., United States	Uruguay	1–0	2–1	Friendly
3	June 2, 2004	Gillette Stadium, Foxboro, United States	Honduras	4–0	4–0	Friendly

== Post-playing career ==
Sanneh operates his own soccer camp system in the Midwest and U.S. Virgin Islands. He also is a coach and consultant for the club soccer team Minneapolis United. In addition to overseeing youth development, he is the founder and executive director of his own charitable foundation headquartered in St. Paul (www.thesannehfoundation.org) which, among other initiatives, aims to help urban youth and also assists in recovery efforts in Haiti.

As of 2013, Sanneh has been playing with Brits Pub FC a local recreational team in Minneapolis, Minnesota.

In the summer of 2013, Sanneh formed a Minnesota Thunder Legends team for a match against the Stegman's Old Boys of Minneapolis in partnership with The Free Beer Movement to help raise money for The Sanneh Foundation.

Sanneh has also been an active participant in the Sports Diplomacy Sports Envoy program for the U.S. Department of State. In this function, he has traveled to Bahrain, Bangladesh, Bolivia, Cyprus, Haiti, and Malaysia, where he worked with to conduct soccer clinics and events that reached more than 3000 youth from underserved areas. In so doing, Sanneh helped contribute to Sports Diplomacy's mission to reach out to youth populations in order to promote growth and a mutual understanding through sports.

In November 2014, Sanneh received the Athletes in Excellence Award from The Foundation for Global Sports Development, in recognition of his community service efforts and work with youth.

In 2017, Sanneh was inducted into the United States Amateur Soccer Association (USASA) Hall of Fame.

In February 2018, Sanneh received the Community Advocate for Change Award from Saint Mary's University of Minnesota.

== Honors ==
United States

- CONCACAF Gold Cup Champions: 2005

United States: On October 21, 2017, Sanneh was inducted into the United States Amateur Soccer Association (USASA) Hall of Fame.
