= MLS Best XI =

Best players of each MLS season

The MLS Best XI is an annual acknowledgment of the best eleven players in Major League Soccer. The selection is determined by a collection of media, players, and MLS club technical staffs.

== Winners ==
Year	Goalkeeper	Defenders	Midfielders	Forwards
1996	(United States) Mark Dodd, Dallas	(Colombia) Leonel Álvarez, Dallas (United States) John Doyle, San Jose (United States) Robin Fraser, LA Galaxy	(El Salvador) Mauricio Cienfuegos, LA Galaxy (Italy) Roberto Donadoni, MetroStars (Bolivia) Marco Etcheverry, D.C. United (United States) Preki, Kansas City (Colombia) Carlos Valderrama, Tampa Bay	(Ecuador) Eduardo Hurtado, LA Galaxy (United States) Roy Lassiter, Tampa Bay
1997	(United States) Brad Friedel, Columbus	(United States) Jeff Agoos, D.C. United (United States) Thomas Dooley, Columbus (Scotland) Richard Gough, Kansas City (United States) Eddie Pope, D.C. United	(United States) Mark Chung, Kansas City (Bolivia) Marco Etcheverry, D.C. United (2) (United States) Preki, Kansas City (2) (Colombia) Carlos Valderrama, Tampa Bay (2)	(El Salvador) Ronald Cerritos, San Jose (Bolivia) Jaime Moreno, D.C. United
1998	(United States) Zach Thornton, Chicago	(United States) Thomas Dooley, Columbus (2) (United States) Robin Fraser, LA Galaxy (2) (Czech Republic) Luboš Kubík, Chicago (United States) Eddie Pope, D.C. United (2)	(United States) Chris Armas, Chicago (El Salvador) Mauricio Cienfuegos, LA Galaxy (2) (Bolivia) Marco Etcheverry, D.C. United (3) (Poland) Piotr Nowak, Chicago	(Trinidad and Tobago) Stern John, Columbus (United States) Cobi Jones, LA Galaxy
1999	(United States) Kevin Hartman, LA Galaxy	(United States) Jeff Agoos, D.C. United (2) (Czech Republic) Luboš Kubík, Chicago (2) (United States) Robin Fraser, LA Galaxy (3)	(United States) Chris Armas, Chicago (2) (El Salvador) Mauricio Cienfuegos, LA Galaxy (3) (Bolivia) Marco Etcheverry, D.C. United (4) (United States) Eddie Lewis, San Jose (United States) Steve Ralston, Tampa Bay	(United States) Jason Kreis, Dallas (Bolivia) Jaime Moreno, D.C. United (2)
2000	(United States) Tony Meola, Kansas City	(United States) Robin Fraser, LA Galaxy (4) (United States) Greg Vanney, LA Galaxy (United States) Peter Vermes, Kansas City	(United States) Chris Armas, Chicago (3) (Poland) Piotr Nowak, Chicago (2) (United States) Steve Ralston, Tampa Bay (2) (Bulgaria) Hristo Stoichkov, Chicago (Colombia) Carlos Valderrama, Tampa Bay (3)	(Senegal) Mamadou Diallo, Tampa Bay (United States) Clint Mathis, MetroStars
2001	(United States) Tim Howard, MetroStars	(United States) Jeff Agoos, San Jose (3) (United States) Carlos Llamosa, Miami (United States) Pablo Mastroeni, Miami (United States) Greg Vanney, LA Galaxy (2)	(United States) Chris Armas, Chicago (4) (Poland) Piotr Nowak, Chicago (3) (United States) Preki, Miami (3)	(Honduras) Alex Pineda Chacón, Miami (Colombia) Diego Serna, Miami (Scotland) John Spencer, Colorado
2002	(United States) Tim Howard, MetroStars (2)	(United States) Wade Barrett, San Jose (United States) Carlos Bocanegra, Chicago (United States) Alexi Lalas, LA Galaxy	(United States) Mark Chung, Colorado (2) (Denmark) Ronnie Ekelund, San Jose (Colombia) Óscar Pareja, Dallas (United States) Steve Ralston, New England (3)	(United States) Jeff Cunningham, Columbus (Guatemala) Carlos Ruiz, LA Galaxy (United States) Taylor Twellman, New England
2003	(Canada) Pat Onstad, San Jose	(United States) Carlos Bocanegra, Chicago (2) (New Zealand) Ryan Nelsen, D.C. United (United States) Eddie Pope, MetroStars (3)	(United States) Chris Armas, Chicago (5) (United States) DaMarcus Beasley, Chicago (United States) Mark Chung, Colorado (3) (United States) Landon Donovan, San Jose (United States) Preki, Kansas City (4)	(United States) Ante Razov, Chicago (Scotland) John Spencer, Colorado (2)
2004	(United States) Joe Cannon, Colorado	(United States) Jimmy Conrad, Kansas City (United States) Robin Fraser, Columbus (5) (New Zealand) Ryan Nelsen, D.C. United (2) (United States) Eddie Pope, MetroStars (4)	(United States) Eddie Gaven, MetroStars (Honduras) Amado Guevara, MetroStars (Republic of Ireland) Ronnie O'Brien, Dallas (United States) Kerry Zavagnin, Kansas City	(United States) Brian Ching, San Jose (Bolivia) Jaime Moreno, D.C. United (3)
2005	(Canada) Pat Onstad, San Jose (2)	(United States) Chris Albright, LA Galaxy (United States) Danny Califf, San Jose (United States) Jimmy Conrad, Kansas City (2)	(United States) Clint Dempsey, New England (Canada) Dwayne De Rosario, San Jose (Argentina) Christian Gómez, D.C. United (Grenada) Shalrie Joseph, New England (Republic of Ireland) Ronnie O'Brien, Dallas (2)	(Bolivia) Jaime Moreno, D.C. United (4) (United States) Taylor Twellman, New England (2)
2006	(United States) Troy Perkins, D.C. United	(United States) Bobby Boswell, D.C. United (United States) José Burciaga Jr., Kansas City (United States) Jimmy Conrad, Kansas City (3)	(United States) Ricardo Clark, Houston (United States) Clint Dempsey, New England (2) (Canada) Dwayne De Rosario, Houston (2) (Argentina) Christian Gómez, D.C. United (2) (United States) Justin Mapp, Chicago	(United States) Jeff Cunningham, Salt Lake (2) (Bolivia) Jaime Moreno, D.C. United (5)
2007	(United States) Brad Guzan, Chivas USA	(United States) Jonathan Bornstein, Chivas USA (United States) Michael Parkhurst, New England (United States) Eddie Robinson, Houston	(Argentina) Guillermo Barros Schelotto, Columbus (Canada) Dwayne De Rosario, Houston (3) (Argentina) Christian Gómez, D.C. United (3) (Grenada) Shalrie Joseph, New England (2) (United States) Ben Olsen, D.C. United	(Colombia) Juan Pablo Angel, Red Bulls (Brazil) Luciano Emílio, D.C. United
2008	(United States) Jon Busch, Chicago	(United States) Jimmy Conrad, Kansas City (4) (United States) Chad Marshall, Columbus (Mali) Bakary Soumaré, Chicago	(Mexico) Cuauhtémoc Blanco, Chicago (Grenada) Shalrie Joseph, New England (3) (United States) Sacha Kljestan, Chivas USA (United States) Robbie Rogers, Columbus (Argentina) Guillermo Barros Schelotto, Columbus (2)	(United States) Kenny Cooper, Dallas (United States) Landon Donovan, LA Galaxy (2)
2009	(United States) Zach Thornton, Chivas USA (2)	(United States) Geoff Cameron, Houston (Colombia) Wilman Conde, Chicago (United States) Chad Marshall, Columbus (2)	(Canada) Dwayne De Rosario, Toronto (4) (United States) Landon Donovan, LA Galaxy (3) (United States) Stuart Holden, Houston (Grenada) Shalrie Joseph, New England (4) (Sweden) Freddie Ljungberg, Seattle	(United States) Conor Casey, Colorado (United States) Jeff Cunningham, Dallas (3)
2010	(Jamaica) Donovan Ricketts, LA Galaxy	(United States) Nat Borchers, Salt Lake (United States) Omar Gonzalez, LA Galaxy (Colombia) Jámison Olave, Salt Lake	(Canada) Dwayne De Rosario, Toronto (5) (United States) Landon Donovan, LA Galaxy (4) (Colombia) David Ferreira, Dallas (France) Sébastien Le Toux, Philadelphia (Argentina) Javier Morales, Salt Lake	(United States) Edson Buddle, LA Galaxy (United States) Chris Wondolowski, San Jose
2011	(United States) Kasey Keller, Seattle	(United States) Todd Dunivant, LA Galaxy (United States) Omar Gonzalez, LA Galaxy (2) (Colombia) Jámison Olave, Salt Lake (2)	(England) David Beckham, LA Galaxy (United States) Brad Davis, Houston (Canada) Dwayne De Rosario, D.C. United (6) (United States) Landon Donovan, LA Galaxy (5) (United States) Brek Shea, Dallas	(France) Thierry Henry, Red Bulls (United States) Chris Wondolowski, San Jose (2)
2012	(Denmark) Jimmy Nielsen, Sporting KC	(Honduras) Víctor Bernárdez, San Jose (United States) Matt Besler, Sporting KC (France) Aurélien Collin, Sporting KC	(Cuba) Osvaldo Alonso, Seattle (United States) Landon Donovan, LA Galaxy (6) (United States) Chris Pontius, D.C. United (United States) Graham Zusi, Sporting KC	(France) Thierry Henry, Red Bulls (2) (Republic of Ireland) Robbie Keane, LA Galaxy (United States) Chris Wondolowski, San Jose (3)
2013	(Jamaica) Donovan Ricketts, Portland (2)	(United States) Matt Besler, Sporting KC (2) (Portugal) José Gonçalves, New England (United States) Omar Gonzalez, LA Galaxy (3)	(Australia) Tim Cahill, Red Bulls (Canada) Will Johnson, Portland (Argentina) Diego Valeri, Portland (United States) Graham Zusi, Sporting KC (2)	(Italy) Marco Di Vaio, Montreal (Republic of Ireland) Robbie Keane, LA Galaxy (2) (United States) Mike Magee, Chicago
2014	(United States) Bill Hamid, D.C. United	(United States) Bobby Boswell, D.C. United (2) (United States) Omar Gonzalez, LA Galaxy (4) (United States) Chad Marshall, Seattle (3)	(United States) Landon Donovan, LA Galaxy (7) (France) Thierry Henry, Red Bulls (3) (United States) Lee Nguyen, New England (Argentina) Diego Valeri, Portland (2)	(Republic of Ireland) Robbie Keane, LA Galaxy (3) (Nigeria) Obafemi Martins, Seattle (England) Bradley Wright-Phillips, Red Bulls
2015	(United States) Luis Robles, Red Bulls	(Belgium) Laurent Ciman, Montreal (United States) Matt Hedges, Dallas (Costa Rica) Kendall Waston, Vancouver	(Colombia) Fabián Castillo, Dallas (United States) Benny Feilhaber, Sporting KC (United States) Ethan Finlay, Columbus (United States) Dax McCarty, Red Bulls	(Italy) Sebastian Giovinco, Toronto (Sierra Leone) Kei Kamara, Columbus (Republic of Ireland) Robbie Keane, LA Galaxy (4)
2016	(Jamaica) Andre Blake, Philadelphia	(United States) Matt Hedges, Dallas (2) (Sweden) Axel Sjöberg, Colorado (Belgium) Jelle Van Damme, LA Galaxy	(Argentina) Mauro Díaz, Dallas (Mexico) Giovani dos Santos, LA Galaxy (United States) Sacha Kljestan, Red Bulls (2) (Argentina) Ignacio Piatti, Montreal	(Italy) Sebastian Giovinco, Toronto (2) (Spain) David Villa, New York City (England) Bradley Wright-Phillips, Red Bulls (2)
2017	(United States) Tim Melia, Sporting KC	(United States) Justin Morrow, Toronto (United States) Ike Opara, Sporting KC (Costa Rica) Kendall Waston, Vancouver (2)	(Paraguay) Miguel Almirón, Atlanta (Italy) Sebastian Giovinco, Toronto (3) (Argentina) Diego Valeri, Portland (3) (Spain) Víctor Vázquez, Toronto	(Venezuela) Josef Martínez, Atlanta (Hungary) Nemanja Nikolić, Chicago (Spain) David Villa, New York City (2)
2018	(United States) Zack Steffen, Columbus	(Jamaica) Kemar Lawrence, Red Bulls (United States) Aaron Long, Red Bulls (United States) Chad Marshall, Seattle (4)	(Argentina) Luciano Acosta, D.C. United (Paraguay) Miguel Almirón, Atlanta (2) (Argentina) Ignacio Piatti, Montreal (2) (Mexico) Carlos Vela, LAFC	(Sweden) Zlatan Ibrahimović, LA Galaxy (Venezuela) Josef Martínez, Atlanta (2) (England) Wayne Rooney, D.C. United
2019	(Italy) Vito Mannone, Minnesota	(United States) Ike Opara, Minnesota (2) (United States) Miles Robinson, Atlanta (United States) Walker Zimmerman, LAFC	(Colombia) Eduard Atuesta, LAFC (Spain) Carles Gil, New England (Argentina) Maximiliano Moralez, New York City (Spain) Alejandro Pozuelo, Toronto	(Sweden) Zlatan Ibrahimović, LA Galaxy (2) (Venezuela) Josef Martínez, Atlanta (3) (Mexico) Carlos Vela, LAFC (2)
2020	(Jamaica) Andre Blake, Philadelphia (2)	(United States) Mark McKenzie, Philadelphia (Ghana) Jonathan Mensah, Columbus (United States) Walker Zimmerman, Nashville (2)	(United States) Brenden Aaronson, Philadelphia (Colombia) Diego Chará, Portland (Uruguay) Nicolás Lodeiro, Seattle (Spain) Alejandro Pozuelo, Toronto (2)	(United States) Jordan Morris, Seattle (Uruguay) Diego Rossi, LAFC (Peru) Raúl Ruidíaz, Seattle
2021	(United States) Matt Turner, New England	(Colombia) Yeimar Gómez Andrade, Seattle (United States) Miles Robinson, Atlanta (2) (United States) Walker Zimmerman, Nashville (3)	(Canada) Tajon Buchanan, New England (Spain) Carles Gil, New England (2) (Germany) Hany Mukhtar, Nashville (Brazil) João Paulo, Seattle	(Argentina) Gustavo Bou, New England (Argentina) Taty Castellanos, New York City (Peru) Raúl Ruidíaz, Seattle (2)
2022	(Jamaica) Andre Blake, Philadelphia (3)	(Norway) Jakob Glesnes, Philadelphia (Germany) Kai Wagner, Philadelphia (United States) Walker Zimmerman, Nashville (4)	(Argentina) Luciano Acosta, Cincinnati (2) (Argentina) Sebastián Driussi, Austin (Hungary) Dániel Gazdag, Philadelphia (Germany) Hany Mukhtar, Nashville (2)	(United States) Jesús Ferreira, Dallas (United States) Brandon Vázquez, Cincinnati (Mexico) Carlos Vela, LAFC (3)
2023	(Switzerland) Roman Bürki, St. Louis	(United States) Matt Miazga, Cincinnati (United States) Tim Parker, St. Louis (United States) Walker Zimmerman, Nashville (5)	(Argentina) Luciano Acosta, Cincinnati (3) (Argentina) Thiago Almada, Atlanta (Mexico) Héctor Herrera, Houston (Germany) Hany Mukhtar, Nashville (3)	(Gabon) Denis Bouanga, LAFC (Greece) Giorgos Giakoumakis, Atlanta (Colombia) Cucho Hernández, Columbus
2024	(Croatia) Kristijan Kahlina, Charlotte	(Spain) Jordi Alba, Miami (Colombia) Yeimar Gómez Andrade, Seattle (2) (Cape Verde) Steven Moreira, Columbus	(Argentina) Luciano Acosta, Cincinnati (4) (Brazil) Evander, Portland (Spain) Riqui Puig, LA Galaxy	(Belgium) Christian Benteke, D.C. (Gabon) Denis Bouanga, LAFC (2) (Colombia) Cucho Hernández, Columbus (2) (Argentina) Lionel Messi, Miami
2025	(Canada) Dayne St. Clair, Minnesota	(United States) Tristan Blackmon, Vancouver (United States) Alex Freeman, Orlando (Norway) Jakob Glesnes, Philadelphia (2) (Germany) Kai Wagner, Philadelphia (2)	(United States) Sebastian Berhalter, Vancouver (Brazil) Evander, Cincinnati (2) (United States) Cristian Roldan, Seattle	(Gabon) Denis Bouanga, LAFC (3) (Denmark) Anders Dreyer, San Diego (Argentina) Lionel Messi, Miami (2)

== Appearances by player ==
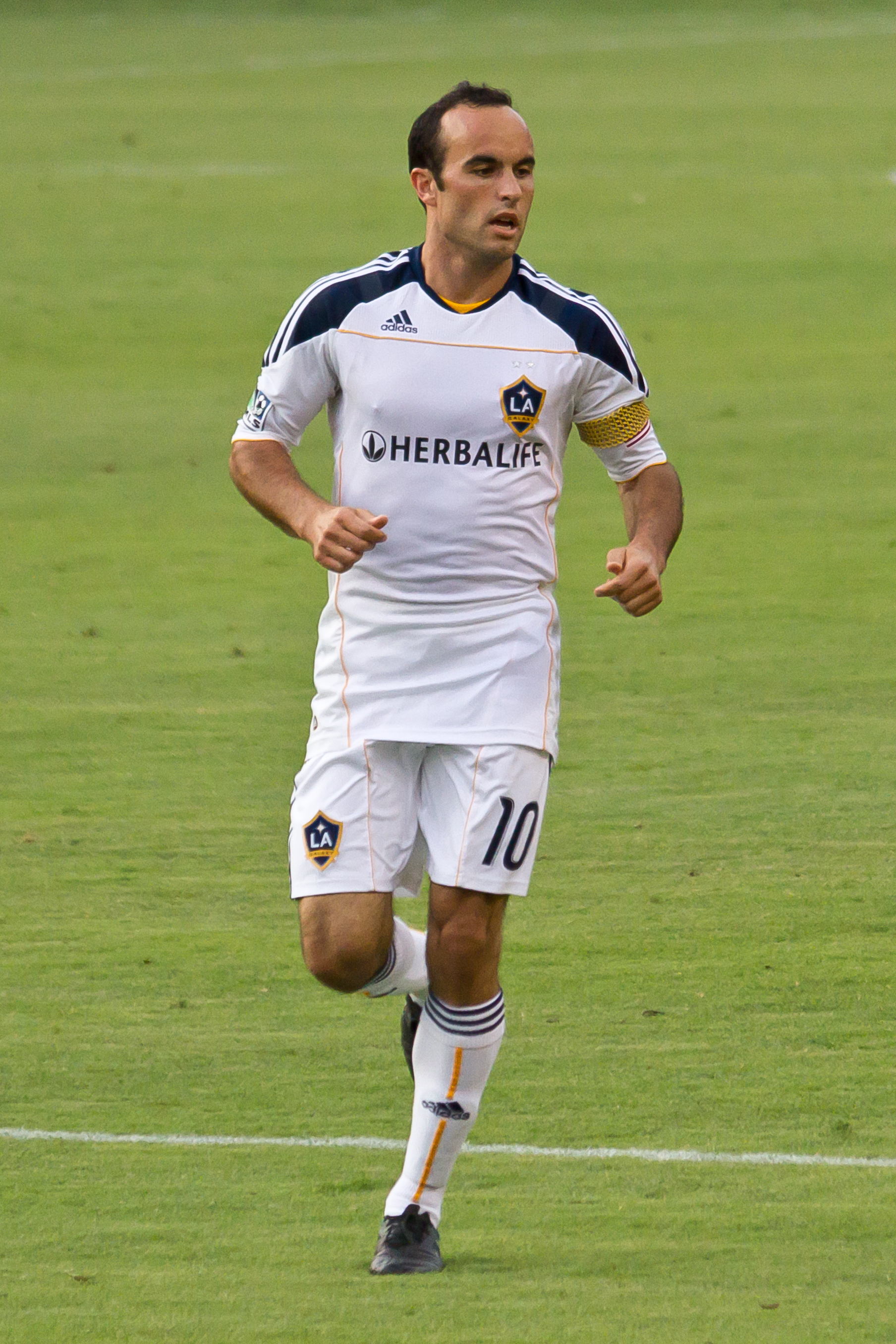
With seven appearances, Landon Donovan has the most selections to the MLS Best XI

The following players have appeared in the MLS Best XI two or more times.

Updated as of the conclusion of the 2025 MLS season.

^	Denotes players who are still active in Major League Soccer
*	Denotes players who are still active outside of Major League Soccer
†	Inducted into the National Soccer Hall of Fame as a player
Year (bold text)	Indicates the player won the MVP Award
Year (italicized text)	Indicates the player won the MLS Defender of the Year Award

MLS Best XI appearances
Player	Apps	Pos	Years	Club(s)
Landon Donovan^{†}	7	M/F	2003, 2008, 2009, 2010, 2011, 2012, 2014	San Jose Earthquakes (1), LA Galaxy (6)
Dwayne De Rosario	6	M	2005, 2006, 2007, 2009, 2010, 2011	San Jose Earthquakes (1), Houston Dynamo (2), Toronto FC (2), D.C. United (1)
Chris Armas	5	M	1998, 1999, 2000, 2001, 2003	Chicago Fire (5)
Robin Fraser	5	D	1996, 1998, 1999, 2000, 2004	LA Galaxy (4), Columbus Crew (1)
Jaime Moreno^{†}	5	F	1997, 1999, 2004, 2005, 2006	D.C. United (5)
Walker Zimmerman^{^}	5	D	2019, 2020, 2021, 2022, 2023	LAFC (1), Nashville SC (4)
Jimmy Conrad	4	D	2004, 2005, 2006, 2008	Kansas City Wizards (4)
Marco Etcheverry^{†}	4	M	1996, 1997, 1998, 1999	D.C. United (4)
Omar Gonzalez^{^}	4	D	2010, 2011, 2013, 2014	LA Galaxy (4)
Shalrie Joseph	4	M	2005, 2007, 2008, 2009	New England Revolution (4)
Robbie Keane	4	F	2012, 2013, 2014, 2015	LA Galaxy (4)
Chad Marshall	4	D	2008, 2009, 2014, 2018	Columbus Crew (2), Seattle Sounders FC (2)
Eddie Pope^{†}	4	D	1997, 1998, 2003, 2004	D.C. United (2), MetroStars (2)
Preki^{†}	4	M	1996, 1997, 2001, 2003	Kansas City Wizards (3), Miami Fusion (1)
Luciano Acosta	4	M	2018, 2022, 2023, 2024	D.C. United (1) FC Cincinnati (3)
Jeff Agoos^{†}	3	D	1997, 1999, 2001	D.C. United (2), San Jose Earthquakes (1)
Andre Blake^{^}	3	GK	2016, 2020, 2022	Philadelphia Union (3)
Mark Chung	3	M	1997, 2002, 2003	Colorado Rapids (3)
Mauricio Cienfuegos	3	M	1996, 1998, 1999	LA Galaxy (3)
Jeff Cunningham	3	F	2002, 2006, 2009	Columbus Crew (1), Real Salt Lake (1), FC Dallas (1)
Sebastian Giovinco	3	F	2015, 2016, 2017	Toronto FC (3)
Christian Gómez	3	M	2005, 2006, 2007	D.C. United (3)
Thierry Henry	3	F	2011, 2012, 2014	N.Y. Red Bulls (3)
Josef Martínez^{^}	3	F	2017, 2018, 2019	Atlanta United FC (3)
Hany Mukhtar^{^}	3	M	2021, 2022, 2023	Nashville SC (3)
Piotr Nowak	3	M	1998, 2000, 2001	Chicago Fire (3)
Steve Ralston	3	M	1999, 2000, 2002	Tampa Bay Mutiny (2), New England Revolution (1)
Carlos Valderrama	3	M	1996, 1997, 2000	Tampa Bay Mutiny (3)
Diego Valeri	3	M	2013, 2014, 2017	Portland Timbers (3)
Carlos Vela	3	M/F	2018, 2019, 2022	LAFC (3)
Chris Wondolowski	3	M	2010, 2011, 2012	San Jose Earthquakes (3)
Denis Bouanga^{^}	3	F	2023, 2024, 2025	Los Angeles FC (3)
Miguel Almirón^{^}	2	M	2017, 2018	Atlanta United (2)
Guillermo Barros Schelotto	2	M	2007, 2008	Columbus Crew (2)
Matt Besler	2	D	2012, 2013	Sporting Kansas City (2)
Carlos Bocanegra^{†}	2	D	2002, 2003	Chicago Fires SC (2)
Bobby Boswell	2	D	2006, 2014	D.C. United (2)
Clint Dempsey^{†}	2	M	2005, 2006	New England Revolution (2)
Thomas Dooley^{†}	2	D	1997, 1998	Columbus Crew (2)
Carles Gil^{^}	2	M	2019, 2022	New England Revolution (2)
Matt Hedges^{^}	2	D	2015, 2016	FC Dallas (2)
Tim Howard	2	GK	2001, 2002	MetroStars (2)
Zlatan Ibrahimović	2	F	2018, 2019	LA Galaxy (2)
Sacha Kljestan	2	M	2008, 2016	Chivas USA (1), New York Red Bulls (1)
Luboš Kubík	2	D	1998, 1999	Chicago Fire SC (2)
Ryan Nelsen	2	D	2003, 2004	D.C. United (2)
Ronnie O'Brien	2	M	2004, 2005	Dallas Burn\FC Dallas (2)
Jámison Olave	2	D	2010, 2011	Real Salt Lake (2)
Pat Onstad	2	GK	2003, 2005	San Jose Earthquakes (2)
Ike Opara	2	D	2017, 2019	Sporting Kansas City (1), Minnesota United FC (1)
Ignacio Piatti	2	M	2016, 2018	Montréal Impact (2)
Alejandro Pozuelo^{*}	2	M	2019, 2020	Toronto FC (2)
Donovan Ricketts	2	GK	2010, 2013	LA Galaxy (1), Portland Timbers (1)
Miles Robinson^{^}	2	D	2019, 2021	Atlanta United (2)
Raúl Ruidíaz^{*}	2	F	2020, 2021	Seattle Sounders FC (2)
John Spencer	2	F	2001, 2003	Colorado Rapids (2)
Zach Thornton	2	GK	1998, 2009	Chicago Fire SC (1), Chivas USA (1)
Taylor Twellman	2	F	2002, 2005	New England Revolution (2)
Greg Vanney	2	D	2000, 2001	LA Galaxy (2)
David Villa	2	F	2016, 2017	New York City FC (2)
Kendall Waston^{*}	2	D	2015, 2017	Vancouver Whitecaps FC (2)
Bradley Wright-Phillips	2	F	2014, 2016	New York Red Bulls (2)
Graham Zusi^{^}	2	M	2012, 2013	Sporting Kansas City (2)
Cucho Hernández^{*}	2	F	2023, 2024	Columbus Crew
Yeimar Gómez Andrade^{^}	2	D	2021, 2024	Seattle Sounders FC
Jakob Glesnes^{^}	2	D	2022, 2025	Philadelphia Union (2)
Evander^{^}	2	M	2024, 2025	Portland Timbers (1), FC Cincinnati (1)
Lionel Messi^{^}	2	F	2024, 2025	Inter Miami CF (2)
Kai Wagner^{^}	2	D	2022, 2025	Philadelphia Union (2)

== Appearances by team ==
Updated as of the conclusion of the 2025 MLS season.

Club	Apps
LA Galaxy	38
D.C. United	29
Chicago Fire	23
Kansas City Wiz/Kansas City Wizards/Sporting Kansas City	22
NY/NJ MetroStars/MetroStars/New York Red Bulls	20
Columbus Crew	18
New England Revolution	17
San Jose Clash/Earthquakes	16
Dallas Burn/FC Dallas	15
Seattle Sounders FC	14
Philadelphia Union	11
Los Angeles FC	9
Toronto FC	9
Atlanta United FC	8
Houston Dynamo	8
Colorado Rapids	7
Nashville SC	7
Portland Timbers	7
Tampa Bay Mutiny	7
FC Cincinnati	6
Miami Fusion	5
Real Salt Lake	5
Chivas USA	4
Montreal Impact/CF Montréal	4
New York City FC	4
Vancouver Whitecaps FC	4
Inter Miami CF	3
Minnesota United FC	3
St. Louis City SC	2
Austin FC	1
Charlotte FC	1
Orlando City SC	1
San Diego FC	1

== Appearances by nationality ==
Updated as of the conclusion of the 2025 MLS season.

Nationality	Apps
United States	153
Argentina	23
Colombia	18
Canada	11
Bolivia	9
Spain	9
Ireland	6
Italy	6
Jamaica	6
Mexico	6
France	5
Germany	5
Brazil	4
El Salvador	4
England	4
Grenada	4
Sweden	4
Belgium	3
Denmark	3
Gabon	3
Honduras	3
Poland	3
Scotland	3
Venezuela	3
Czech Republic	2
Costa Rica	2
Hungary	2
New Zealand	2
Norway	2
Paraguay	2
Peru	2
Uruguay	2
Australia	1
Bulgaria	1
Cape Verde	1
Croatia	1
Cuba	1
Ecuador	1
Ghana	1
Greece	1
Guatemala	1
Mali	1
Nigeria	1
Portugal	1
Senegal	1
Sierra Leone	1
Switzerland	1
Trinidad and Tobago	1

== See also ==
- MLS All-Time Best XI
