= Landon Donovan MVP Award =

Annual award for Major League Soccer players

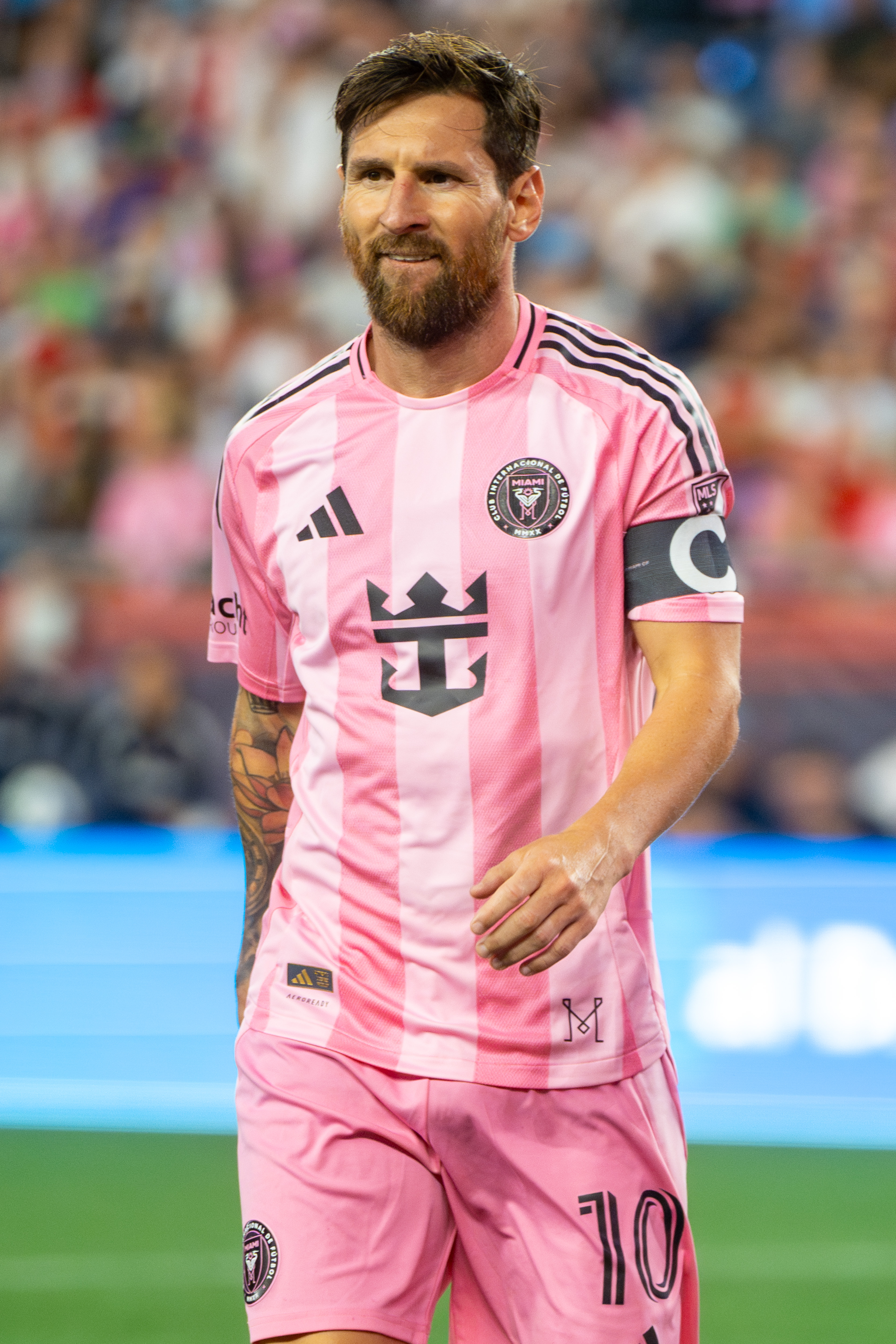
- Lionel Messi is the current award holder
- Date: 1996; 30 years ago
- Presented by: MLS
- Currently held by: (Argentina) Lionel Messi (2nd award)

Highlights
- Most awards: (United States) Preki (Argentina) Lionel Messi (2 awards each)

The Landon Donovan MVP Award is an annual award for Major League Soccer players. It is voted on by media, MLS players, and club management and is given to the player deemed the most valuable player in the league each season.

From 1996 to 2007, the award was known as the Honda MLS Most Valuable Player, for commercial purposes. From 2007 to 2014, the award was titled the Volkswagen MLS Most Valuable Player.

Players for D.C. United have won the award a record four times, while Kansas City and Los Angeles Galaxy players have won a second best three times. Carlos Valderrama won the award for the inaugural 1996 season. Kansas City's Preki is the first player to ever win twice, in 1997 and 2003, while Lionel Messi is the only player to ever win twice consecutively, in 2024 and 2025.

On January 15, 2015, MLS renamed its MVP award in honor of Landon Donovan, who won the award in 2009 and retired as the all-time leader in goals and assists in the league's history.

== Winners ==
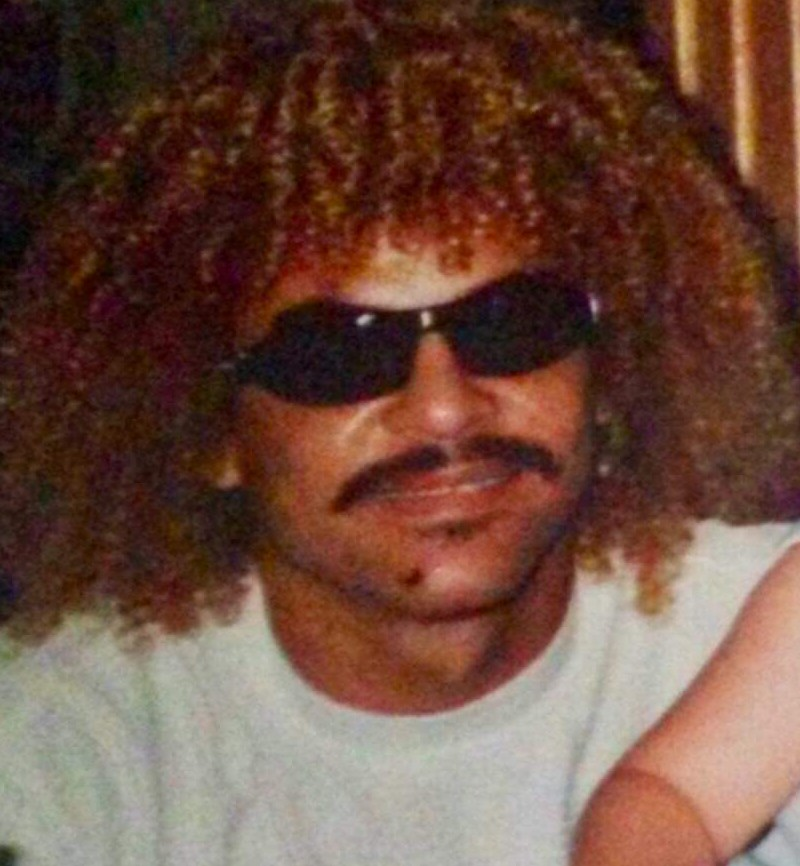
Carlos Valderrama won the inaugural award for the Tampa Bay Mutiny in 1996

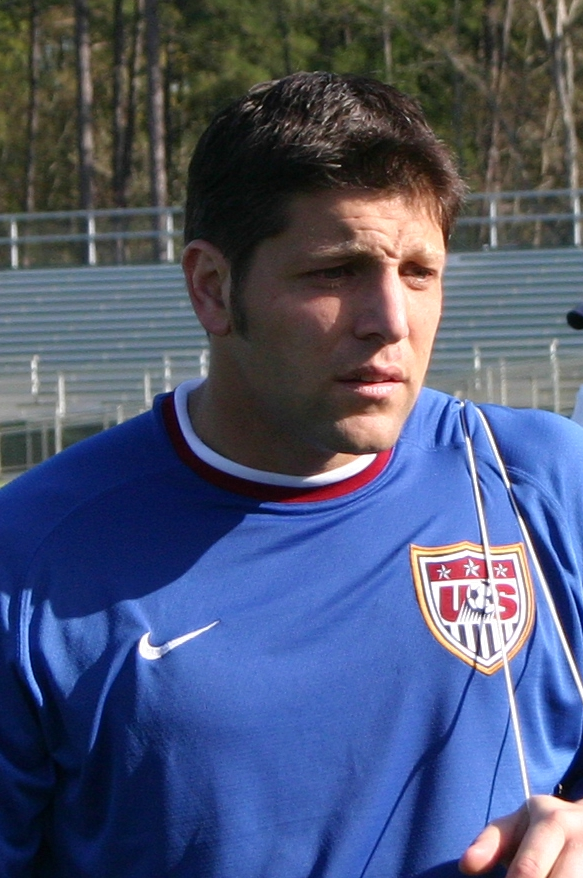
Tony Meola is the only goalkeeper to win the MVP award.

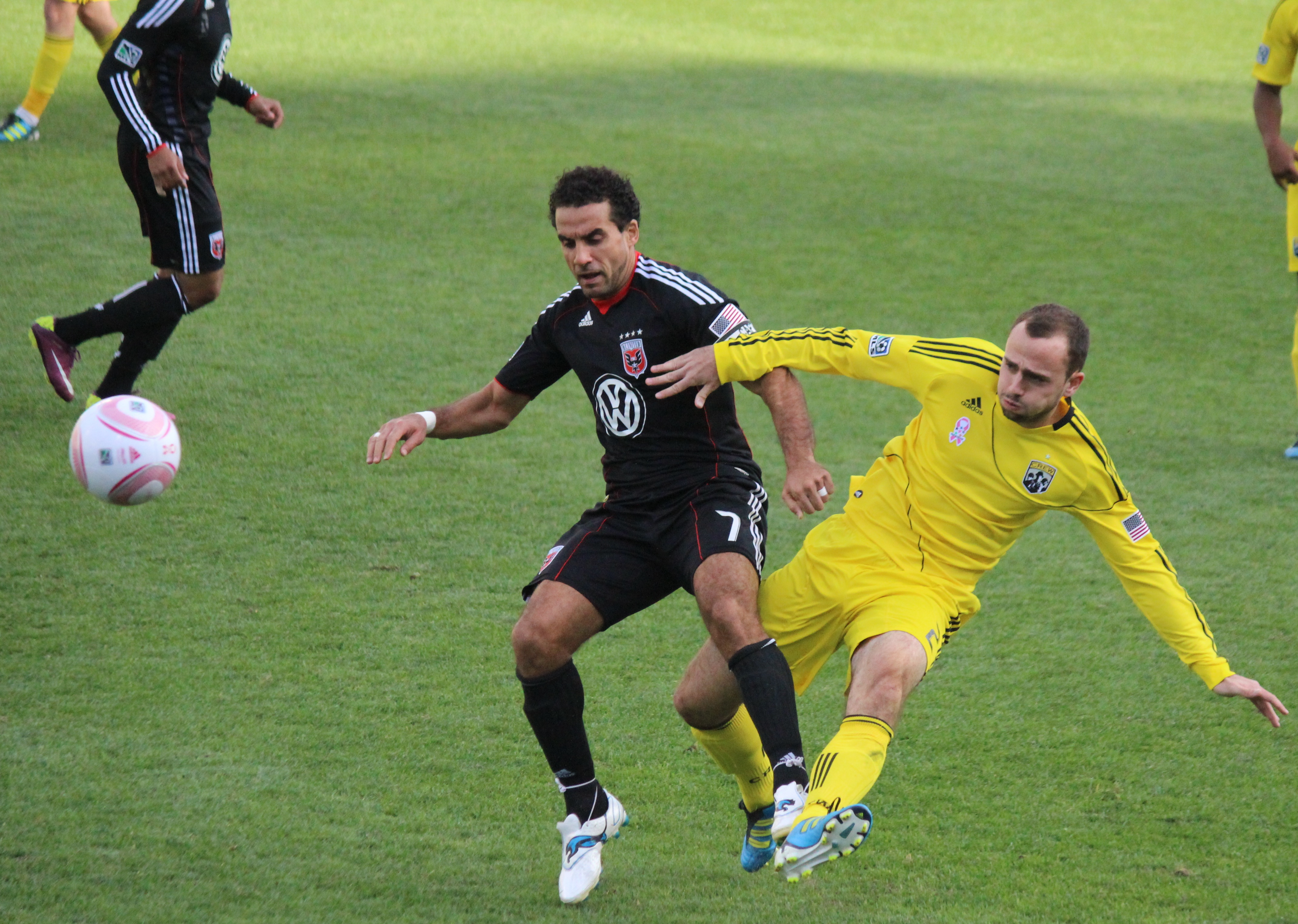
In 2011, Dwayne De Rosario became the first Canadian player to win MVP.

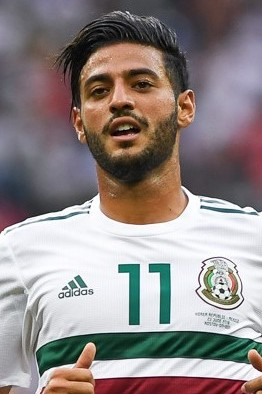
Carlos Vela scored a record 34 goals during his 2019 MVP season.

As of 2025 MLS season.

Season	Player	Club	Other Finalists
1996	(Colombia) Carlos Valderrama	Tampa Bay Mutiny	Roy Lassiter, Preki
1997	(United States) Preki	Kansas City Wizards	Marco Etcheverry, Carlos Valderrama
1998	(Bolivia) Marco Etcheverry	D.C. United	Cobi Jones, Peter Nowak
1999	(United States) Jason Kreis	Dallas Burn	Marco Etcheverry, Jaime Moreno
2000	(United States) Tony Meola	Kansas City Wizards	Mamadou Diallo, Clint Mathis
2001	(Honduras) Álex Pineda Chacón	Miami Fusion	Jeff Agoos, Diego Serna
2002	(Guatemala) Carlos Ruíz	Los Angeles Galaxy	Mark Chung, Taylor Twellman
2003	(United States) Preki (2)	Kansas City Wizards	Ante Razov, John Spencer
2004	(Honduras) Amado Guevara	MetroStars	Joe Cannon, Jaime Moreno
2005	(United States) Taylor Twellman	New England Revolution	Dwayne De Rosario, Jaime Moreno
2006	(Argentina) Christian Gómez	D.C. United	Jeff Cunningham, Dwayne De Rosario
2007	(Brazil) Luciano Emílio	D.C. United	Juan Pablo Ángel, Cuauhtémoc Blanco
2008	(Argentina) Guillermo Barros Schelotto	Columbus Crew	Landon Donovan, Cuauhtémoc Blanco
2009	(United States) Landon Donovan	Los Angeles Galaxy	Shalrie Joseph, Jeff Cunningham
2010	(Colombia) David Ferreira	FC Dallas	Edson Buddle, Chris Wondolowski
2011	(Canada) Dwayne De Rosario	D.C. United	Brad Davis, Brek Shea
2012	(United States) Chris Wondolowski	San Jose Earthquakes	Thierry Henry, Graham Zusi
2013	(United States) Mike Magee	Chicago Fire	Robbie Keane, Marco Di Vaio
2014	(Republic of Ireland) Robbie Keane	Los Angeles Galaxy	Lee Nguyen, Obafemi Martins
2015	(Italy) Sebastian Giovinco	Toronto FC	Kei Kamara, Benny Feilhaber
2016	(Spain) David Villa	New York City FC	Bradley Wright-Phillips, Sacha Kljestan
2017	(Argentina) Diego Valeri	Portland Timbers	David Villa, Nemanja Nikolić
2018	(Venezuela) Josef Martínez	Atlanta United FC	Miguel Almirón, Zlatan Ibrahimović
2019	(Mexico) Carlos Vela	Los Angeles FC	Zlatan Ibrahimović, Josef Martínez
2020	(Spain) Alejandro Pozuelo	Toronto FC	Andre Blake, Nicolás Lodeiro, Jordan Morris, Diego Rossi
2021	(Spain) Carles Gil	New England Revolution	Hany Mukhtar, João Paulo, Dániel Sallói, Valentín Castellanos
2022	(Germany) Hany Mukhtar	Nashville SC	Sebastián Driussi, Andre Blake
2023	(Argentina) Luciano Acosta	FC Cincinnati	Thiago Almada, Denis Bouanga
2024	(Argentina) Lionel Messi	Inter Miami CF	Cucho Hernández, Evander
2025	(Argentina) Lionel Messi (2)	Inter Miami CF	Anders Dreyer, Denis Bouanga, Evander, Sam Surridge

== Wins by team ==
Club	Wins
D.C. United	4
Kansas City Wizards/Sporting KC	3
LA Galaxy	3
Dallas Burn/FC Dallas	2
Inter Miami CF	2
New England Revolution	2
Toronto FC	2
Atlanta United FC	1
Chicago Fire	1
FC Cincinnati	1
Columbus Crew	1
Los Angeles FC	1
Miami Fusion	1
Nashville SC	1
New York City FC	1
NY/NJ MetroStars/New York Red Bulls	1
Portland Timbers	1
San Jose Earthquakes	1
Tampa Bay Mutiny	1

== Wins by nationality ==
Nationality	Wins
United States	8
Argentina	6
Spain	3
Colombia	2
Honduras	2
Bolivia	1
Brazil	1
Canada	1
Germany	1
Guatemala	1
Ireland	1
Italy	1
Mexico	1
Venezuela	1

== See also ==
- Best MLS Player ESPY Award
