= Mauricio Cienfuegos =

Salvadoran footballer (born 1968)

Personal information
- Full name: José Mauricio Cienfuegos
- Date of birth: 12 February 1968 (age 58)
- Place of birth: San Salvador, El Salvador
- Height: 5 ft 6 in (1.68 m)
- Position: Attacking midfielder

Senior career*
Years	Team	Apps	(Gls)
1985	Racing Junior		
1986–1987	Marte Soyapango		
1988–1991	Luis Ángel Firpo		
1991–1992	Atlético Morelia	37	(3)
1992–1993	Santos Laguna	18	(0)
1994–1995	Jaibos Tampico Madero		
1994–1996	Luis Ángel Firpo		
1996–2003	Los Angeles Galaxy	206	(35)

International career
1987–2003	El Salvador	68	(8)

Managerial career
- 2008: Nejapa
- 2011–2020: Los Angeles Galaxy (academy)
- 2023-: El Salvador (assistant)
- * Club domestic league appearances and goals

José Mauricio Cienfuegos (born 12 February 1968) is a Salvadoran former professional footballer who played as an attacking midfielder. He is the assistant coach to the El Salvador national team under the coaching staff of Hugo Pérez.

== Club career ==
Cienfuegos began his professional career in 1985 with Racing Junior. He played the next two seasons for Soyapango, and then moved to Luís Ángel Firpo, where he would play for four years.

Cienfuegos moved to Mexico to play for Atlético Morelia in the 1991, and then signed with Santos in 1992. However, after just one season at Santos Laguna, Cienfuegos became unhappy with how he was being used at the club and decided to try his luck in Europe. In the summer of 1993, he had trials with Swiss champions Servette and La Liga side Lleida. Cienfuegos was close to signing with the Spanish side, but ultimately he was not offered a contract, and he returned to Mexico with a brief stint at Tampico Madero during the second half of the 1994-95 season.

Cienfuegos played two more seasons with Luis Ángel Firpo before joining Major League Soccer for its inaugural 1996 season. Cienfuegos played for Los Angeles Galaxy for eight years as a midfielder, from 1996 until his retirement after the 2003 season. During those years, he established himself, along with Carlos Valderrama, Marco Etcheverry, and Peter Nowak, as one of the best playmakers in the league. He was elected to the MLS Best XI three times, in 1996, 1998, and 1999, and played in seven MLS All-Star Games as a central midfielder. During his MLS career, Galaxy won the 2000 CONCACAF Champions Cup, the 2001 U.S. Open Cup, and the 2002 MLS Cup. He finished his MLS career with 78 assists and 35 goals in 206 games for the club.

== International career ==
Cienfuegos was an important player for the El Salvador national team, joining the team as a teenager, and continuing to lead his national side well into his thirties. He has earned a total of 68 caps, scoring 8 goals, all of them during a home game. He has represented his country in a massive 32 FIFA World Cup qualification matches and played at the 1995 UNCAF Nations Cup as well as the 1996 and 1998 CONCACAF Gold Cups.

Cienfuegos played his final international game in July 2003, in a testimonial match against Mexico, played at the Galaxy's Home Depot Center.

== Coaching career ==
Cienfuegos was appointed head coach of Nejapa in El Salvador's Primera División de Fútbol Profesional in 2008. Despite having a good first season, a poor start to his second season in charge and non-payment of his players led to him to resign as head coach of the team. On 22 June 2011, it was announced that Mauricio Cienfuegos had been appointed as a technical coach for the LA Galaxy Academy. In January 2023, Cienfuegos was appointed to become assistant coach for the El Salvador national team.

== Personal life ==
Cienfuegos lives with his wife and three children in the San Gabriel Valley, California.

== Career statistics ==
Scores and results list El Salvador's goal tally first.

#	Date	Venue	Opponent	Score	Result	Competition
1	23 July 1992	Estadio Cuscatlán, San Salvador, El Salvador	Nicaragua	2–0	5–1	1994 FIFA World Cup qualification
2	1 November 1992	Estadio Cuscatlán, San Salvador, El Salvador	Bermuda	3–0	4–1	1994 FIFA World Cup qualification
3	23 March 1993	Estadio Cuscatlán, San Salvador, El Salvador	United States	2–2	2–2	Friendly match
4	29 November 1995	Estadio Oscar Quiteno, Santa Ana, El Salvador	Belize	1–0	3–0	1995 UNCAF Nations Cup
5	3 December 1995	Estadio Flor Blanca, San Salvador, El Salvador	Costa Rica	2–1	2–1	1995 UNCAF Nations Cup
6	8 September 1996	Estadio Cuscatlán, San Salvador, El Salvador	Cuba	5–0	5–0	1998 FIFA World Cup qualification
7	14 September 1997	Estadio Cuscatlán, San Salvador, El Salvador	Canada	3–1	4–1	1998 FIFA World Cup qualification
8	16 July 2000	Estadio Cuscatlán, San Salvador, El Salvador	Honduras	2–5	2–5	2002 FIFA World Cup qualification

== Honors ==
CD Luis Ángel Firpo

- Primera División de Fútbol Profesional: 1988–89, 1990–91, 1991–92

Los Angeles Galaxy

- CONCACAF Champions' Cup: 2000

(Runner-up 1997)

- MLS Cup: 2002

(Runner-up : 1996, 1999, 2001)

- MLS Supporters' Shield: 1998, 2002

(Runner-up : 1996, 1999)

- U.S. Open Cup: 2001

(Runner-up : 2002)

Individual

- MLS All-Star: 1996, 1997, 1998, 1999, 2000
- MLS Best XI: 1996, 1998, 1999
