= 1999 MLS All-Star Game =

Soccer game played in San Diego, California

MLS All-Star Game 1999
- Event: 1999 Major League Soccer season
MLS West	MLS East
(United States)	(United States)
6	4
- Date: July 17, 1999
- Venue: Qualcomm Stadium, San Diego, California
- Man of the Match: Preki (MLS West)
- Referee: Sandra Hunt
- Attendance: 23,227
- Weather: Sunny, 78 °F (26 °C)

The 1999 Major League Soccer All-Star Game was the 4th Major League Soccer All-Star Game, played on July 17, 1999, at Qualcomm Stadium in San Diego, California. The MLS Western All-Stars defeated the MLS Eastern All-Stars, 6–4, in front of 23,227 fans at Qualcomm Stadium in San Diego. While Major League Soccer did not have a team in San Diego at the time of the game, it would eventually place a team in the city called San Diego FC in 2023 that began play in 2025.

== Match ==
=== Summary ===
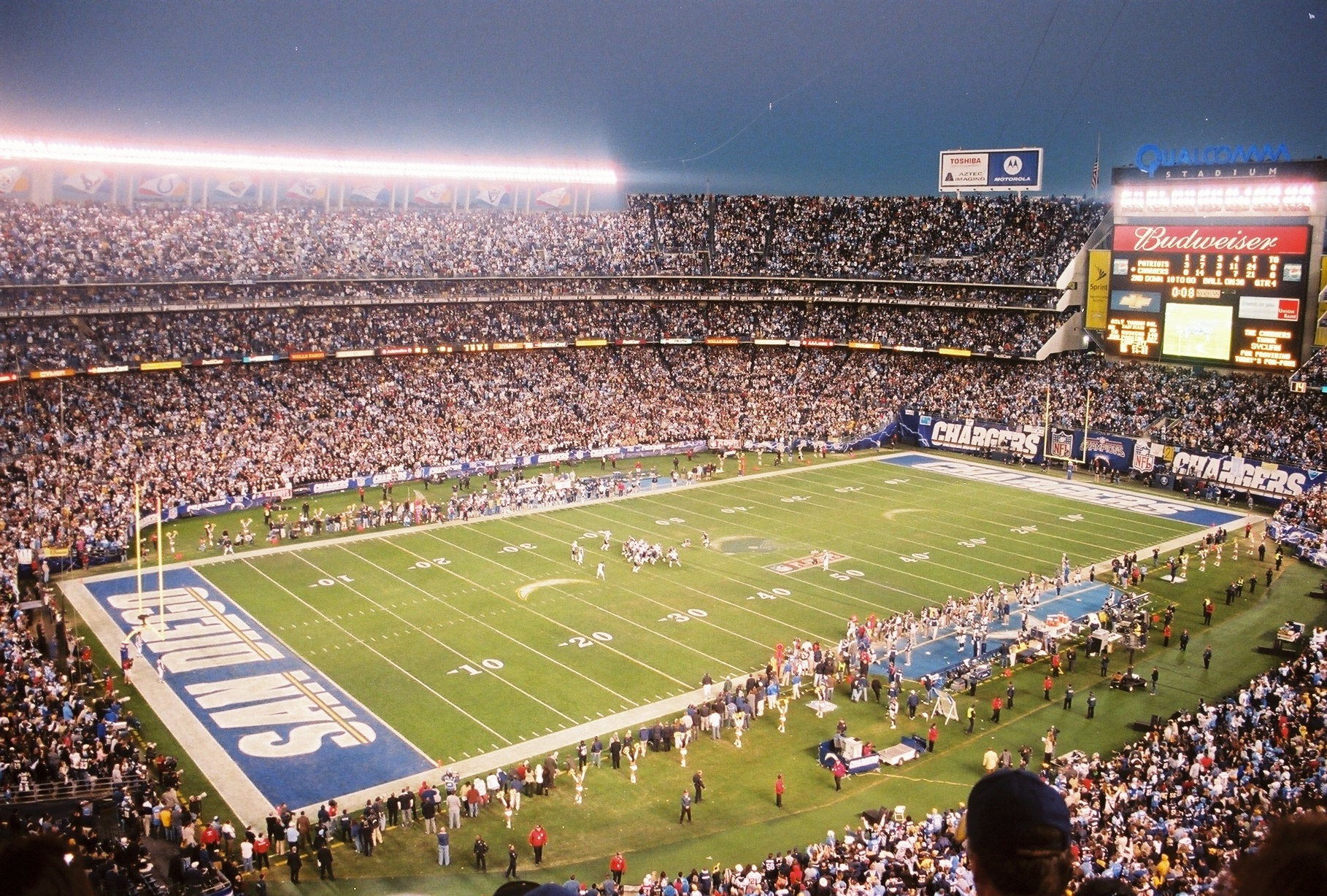
Qualcomm Stadium hosted the match

Roy Lassiter scored in the first minute of the match for the East, but their lead did not last long. Preki found an equalizer for the West in the 13th minute, and a go-ahead goal from Roman Kosecki gave them a 2–1 advantage in the 32nd minute. Cobi Jones netted one of his own in the 36th minute before another tally from Preki, who earned MVP honors, in the 38th minute gave the West a 4–1 halftime lead. A string of three unanswered second-half goals by the East brought things level once again.

A penalty kick by New England Revolution forward Joe-Max Moore in the 62nd minute, and strikes from Carlos Valderrama (73’) and Stern John (83’) capped the comeback. It would be short-lived, however. Two late goals from Mauricio Wright (84’) and Ronald Cerritos (89’) secured the victory for the West. The MLS Western All-Stars recorded their first win over the East in three All-Star game tries. Jeff Baicher was originally scheduled to appear for the West All-Star Team but injury prevented it from happening. He would be replaced by Paul Bravo.

=== Details ===
1999 MLS All-Star Game
July 17, 1999

MLS West (United States)	6–4	(United States) MLS East
Preki 13', 38'; Kosecki 32'; Jones 36'; Wright 84'; Cerritos 89'	Report	Lassiter 1'; Moore 62' (pen.); Valderrama 73'; John 83'

Qualcomm Stadium, San Diego
Attendance: 23,227
Referee: Sandra Hunt

West
East

GK	(United States) Zach Thornton	(substituted off) 46'
DF	(United States) Marcelo Balboa		(substituted off) 66'
DF	(Czech Republic) Lubos Kubik	(substituted off) 46'		(substituted on) 79'
DF	(United States) Alexi Lalas	(substituted off) 46'	(substituted on) 66'	(substituted off) 79'
DF	(United States) Cobi Jones		(substituted off) 61'
MF	(United States) Eddie Lewis	(substituted off) 46'
MF	(Poland) Piotr Nowak	(substituted off) 46'
MF	(United States) Preki	(substituted off) 46'
MF	(United States) Chris Armas	(substituted off) 46'
FW	(El Salvador) Raúl Díaz Arce	(substituted off) 46'
FW	(Poland) Roman Kosecki	(substituted off) 46'	(substituted on) 61'
Substitutions:
GK	(United States) Matt Jordan	(substituted on) 46'
DF	(Costa Rica) Mauricio Wright	(substituted on) 46'
DF	(United States) Robin Fraser	(substituted on) 46'
FW	(United States) Jason Kreis	(substituted on) 46'
MF	(United States) Paul Bravo	(substituted on) 46'
MF	(El Salvador) Mauricio Cienfuegos	(substituted on) 46'
MF	(United States) Ross Paule	(substituted on) 46'
FW	(Mexico) Carlos Hermosillo	(substituted on) 46'
FW	(El Salvador) Ronald Cerritos	(substituted on) 46'
Coach:
?

GK	(United States) Tom Presthus	(substituted off) 46'
DF	(United States) Eddie Pope	(substituted off) 46'
DF	(United States) Jeff Agoos	(substituted off) 46'
DF	(United States) Thomas Dooley	(substituted off) 46'
DF	(United States) Richie Williams	(substituted off) 46'
MF	(United States) John Harkes	(substituted off) 46'
MF	(Colombia) Carlos Valderrama
MF	(Bolivia) Marco Etcheverry
MF	(United States) Ben Olsen	(substituted off) 46'
FW	(United States) Brian McBride	(substituted off) 46'	(substituted on) 54'
FW	(United States) Roy Lassiter	(substituted off) 46'
Substitutions:
GK	(Italy) Walter Zenga	(substituted on) 46'
FW	(Poland) Robert Warzycha	(substituted on) 46'
DF	(United States) Leo Cullen	(substituted on) 46'
DF	(United States) Carlos Llamosa	(substituted on) 46'
FW	(Trinidad and Tobago) Stern John	(substituted on) 46'
MF	(United States) Brian Maisonneuve	(substituted on) 46'
MF	(Canada) Mark Chung	(substituted on) 46'	(substituted off) 54'
FW	(United States) Joe-Max Moore	(substituted on) 46'
FW	(Bolivia) Jaime Moreno	(substituted on) 46'
Coach:
?

MLS All-Star MVP:
(United States) Preki (MLS East)
Assistant referees:
Tom Bodadilla
Jorge Reyes
Fourth official:

Match rules

- 90 minutes.
- Unlimited substitutions.
- No extra time.
- Penalty shoot-out if scores still level.
