= 2000 MLS All-Star Game =

Soccer game played in Columbus, Ohio

MLS All-Star Game 2000
- Event: 2000 Major League Soccer season
MLS West	MLS East
(United States)	(United States)
4	9
- Date: July 29, 2000
- Venue: Columbus Crew Stadium, Columbus, Ohio
- Man of the Match: Mamadou Diallo (MLS East)
- Referee: Paul Tamberino
- Attendance: 23,495
- Weather: Cloudy, 78°F

The 2000 Major League Soccer All-Star Game was the fifth MLS All-Star Game. It was played on July 29, 2000 at Columbus Crew Stadium in Columbus, Ohio. In the highest scoring MLS All-Star Game, the Eastern Conference won 9-4.

Players from the league's three division were divided into East and West teams, decided by fans through voting online and at stadiums and stores.

== Match details ==
2000 MLS All-Star Game
July 29, 2000

MLS West (United States)	4–9	(United States) MLS East
Razov 17', 22'; Cienfuegos 19'; Nowak 44'	Report	Mathis 2'; Moreno 36'; Valencia 39'; Chung 51'; Diallo 59', 61'; Heaps 65'; Washington 67'; McBride 76'

Columbus Crew Stadium, Columbus
Attendance: 23,495
Referee: Paul Tamberino

West
East

GK	(United States) Tony Meola
DF	(United States) Robin Fraser
DF	(United States) Greg Vanney
DF	(United States) Marcelo Balboa
DF	(Iran) Khodadad Azizi
MF	(United States) Preki (c)
MF	(El Salvador) Mauricio Cienfuegos
MF	12	(Poland) Piotr Nowak
MF	(United States) Chris Armas
FW	9	(United States) Ante Razov
FW	13	(United States) Cobi Jones
Substitutions:
GK	22	(United States) Zach Thornton
DF	(United States) Peter Vermes
MF	(United States) Chris Henderson
FW	(Mexico) Luis Hernández
MF	(United States) Dario Brose
MF	2	(United States) Matt McKeon
FW	(United States) Jason Kreis
FW	(Ecuador) Ariel Graziani
Manager:

(substituted off) 46'	(substituted in) 80'
(substituted off) 46'
(substituted off) 46'	(substituted in) 67'	(substituted off) 80'
(substituted off) 67'
(substituted off) 46'
(substituted off) 46'
(substituted off) 32'
(substituted off) 46'
(substituted off) 46'
(substituted in) 46'
(substituted in) 46'
(substituted in) 46'
(substituted in) 46'
(substituted in) 46'
(substituted in) 32'
(substituted in) 46'
(substituted in) 46'

GK	1	(United States) Mike Ammann	(substituted off) 46'	(substituted in) 88'
DF		(United States) Eddie Pope	(substituted off) 32'
DF		(Germany) Lothar Matthäus	(substituted off) 46'
DF		(United States) Jeff Agoos	(substituted off) 34'
DF	6	(United States) John Harkes
MF		(United States) Steve Ralston	(substituted off) 34'
MF		(Colombia) Carlos Valderrama
MF		(United States) Mark Chung		(substituted off) 88'
MF	13	(United States) Clint Mathis	(substituted off) 46'
FW	9	(Bolivia) Jaime Moreno	(substituted off) 46'
FW		(Colombia) Adolfo Valencia	(substituted off) 46'
Substitutions:
GK		(United States) Scott Garlick	(substituted in) 46'
DF	33	(United States) Mike Clark	(substituted in) 32'
DF	4	(United States) Jay Heaps	(substituted in) 46'
DF		(United States) Mike Petke	(substituted in) 34'
FW	20	(United States) Brian McBride	(substituted in) 46'
MF		(Argentina) Pablo Mastroeni	(substituted in) 34'
FW	16	(Senegal) Mamadou Diallo	(substituted in) 46'
FW		(United States) Dante Washington	(substituted in) 46'
Manager:

Assistant referees:
George Vergara
Robert Fereday
