= 1996 MLS All-Star Game =

Soccer game played in East Rutherford, New Jersey

MLS All-Star Game 1996
- Event: 1996 Major League Soccer season
MLS East	MLS West
(United States)	(United States)
3	2
- Date: July 14, 1996
- Venue: Giants Stadium, East Rutherford, New Jersey
- Man of the Match: Carlos Valderrama (MLS East)
- Referee: Kevin Stott
- Attendance: 78,416

The 1996 Major League Soccer All-Star Game was the first Major League Soccer All-Star Game, a soccer match involving all-stars from Major League Soccer. Teams of the best players from each conference played against each other at Giants Stadium, East Rutherford, on July 14, 1996. The MLS All-Stars East won the game 3–2, with goals from Tab Ramos, Giovanni Savarese and Steve Pittman while Preki and Jason Kreis scored for the MLS All-Stars West. MLS All-Stars East midfielder Carlos Valderrama was named as the game's Most Valuable Player. Kevin Stott refereed the game, which was attended by 78,416 spectators.

== Venue ==
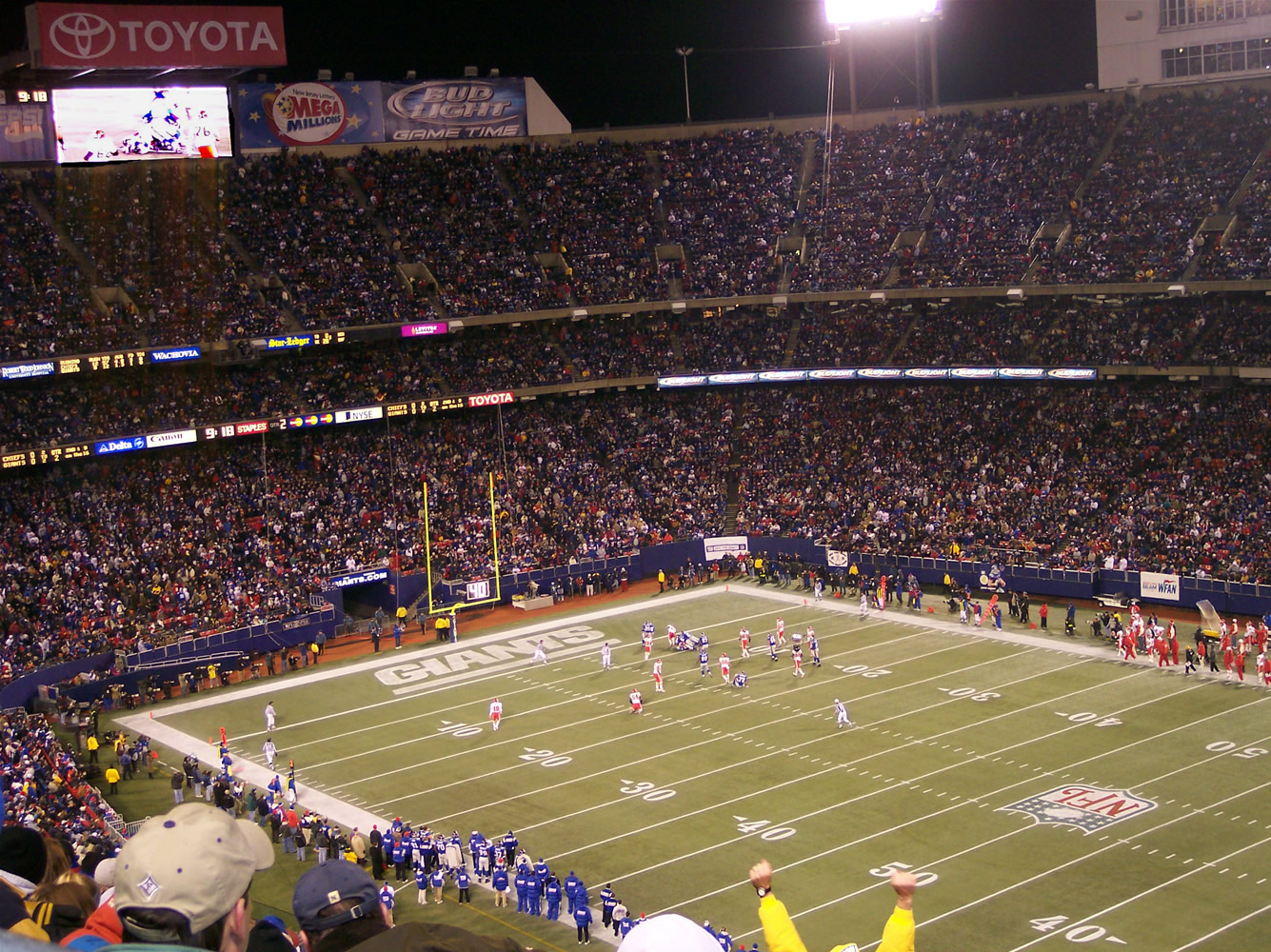
Giants Stadium in East Rutherford, NJ, hosted the match

== Match details ==
1996 MLS All-Star Game
July 14, 1996

MLS East (United States)	3–2	(United States) MLS West
Ramos 14'; Savarese 69'; Pittman 88'	Report	Preki 33'; Kreis 37'

Giants Stadium, East Rutherford, NJ
Attendance: 78,416
Referee: Kevin Stott

East
West

GK	1	(United States) Tony Meola	(substituted off) 45'
DF	5	(United States) Martín Vásquez	(substituted off) 67'
DF	12	(United States) Jeff Agoos
DF	18	(United States) Cle Kooiman	(substituted off) 45'
DF	22	(United States) Alexi Lalas
MF	7	(Italy) Roberto Donadoni	(substituted off) 35'
MF	9	(Colombia) Carlos Valderrama
MF	10	(United States) Tab Ramos	(substituted off) 60'
FW	11	(United States) Roy Lassiter	(substituted off) 42'
FW	16	(Brazil) Wélton
FW	20	(United States) Brian McBride
Substitutions:
GK	23	(United States) Mark Dougherty	(substituted in) 45'
DF	3	(United States) Steve Pittman	(substituted in) 45'
MF	8	(Bolivia) Marco Etcheverry	(substituted in) 35'
MF	15	(South Africa) Doctor Khumalo	(substituted in) 60'
FW	17	(Venezuela) Giovanni Savarese	(substituted in) 42'
FW	14	(United States) Steve Rammel	(substituted in) 67'
Coach:
(Netherlands) Thomas Rongen

GK	9	(Mexico) Jorge Campos	(substituted off) 45'
DF	3	(United States) John Doyle
DF	4	(United States) Robin Fraser
DF	6	(United States) Dan Calichman	(substituted off) 45'
MF	8	(United States) Preki
MF	10	(El Salvador) Mauricio Cienfuegos	(substituted off) 45'
MF	12	(United States) Cobi Jones	(substituted off) 45'
MF	14	(Colombia) Leonel Álvarez
MF	15	(United States) Jason Kreis
FW	11	(United States) Eric Wynalda	(substituted off) 45'
FW	29	(Ecuador) Eduardo Hurtado	(substituted off) 45'
Substitutions:
GK	1	(United States) Mark Dodd	(substituted in) 45'
DF	22	(Argentina) Diego Soñora	(substituted in) 45'
MF	16	(United States) Paul Bravo	(substituted in) 45'
MF	7	(United States) Mark Santel	(substituted in) 45'
FW	12	(Zimbabwe) Digital Takawira	(substituted in) 45'
FW	26	(Scotland) Mo Johnston	(substituted in) 45'
Coach:
(Germany) Lothar Osiander

Most Valuable Player:
(Colombia) Carlos Valderrama (MLS East)

Assistant referees:
Arthur Reed
Gregory Barkey
Fourth official:
Ruben Rodhas

Match rules

- 90 minutes.
- Unlimited substitutions.
- No extra time.
- Penalty shoot-out if scores still level.
