= MLS All-Time Best XI =

Best players in Major League Soccer from 1996 to 2005

The Major League Soccer All-Time Best XI was selected In 2005 as part of the league's tenth anniversary celebrations. Major League Soccer, the top soccer league in the United States, named its All-Time Best XI, a selection of the best eleven players in the history of the league. The winners were chosen by a combination of voting that included online voting on the league's official website, media votes, and MLS coaches and general managers.

The All-Time Best XI team was chosen from a pool of 78 players who were previous "Best XI" yearly selections or who were named to at least three All-Star Games since the inaugural season in 1996. D.C. United had four players selected who were with the team from 1996–2000, when D.C. United was the dominant team in MLS. Nine of the eleven players selected played with the league in the 1996 inaugural season; only Nowak (joined 1998) and Donovan (joined 2001) did not.

== All-Time Best XI ==
Pos	Player	Teams	MLS accolades
GK	(United States) Tony Meola	MetroStars/New York (1996–98, 2005–06); Kansas City (1999–2004)	62 shutouts
DF	(United States) Jeff Agoos	D.C. United (1996–2000), San Jose (2001–04), MetroStars (2005)	3 times MLS Best XI
DF	(United States) Marcelo Balboa	Colorado (1996–2001), MetroStars (2002)	—
DF	(United States) Eddie Pope	D.C. United (1996–2002), MetroStars (2003-04), Salt Lake (2005–07)	4 times MLS Best XI
MF	(Poland) Piotr Nowak	Chicago (1998–2002)	48 assists
MF	(United States) Preki	Kansas City (1996–2000, 2002–05), Miami (2001)	112 assists 4 times MLS Best XI
MF	(Bolivia) Marco Etcheverry	D.C. United (1996–2003)	101 assists, 4 times MLS Best XI
MF	(Colombia) Carlos Valderrama	Tampa Bay (1996–97, 2000–01), Miami (1998–99), Colorado (2001-02)	114 assists
MF	(United States) Landon Donovan	San Jose (2001–04), Los Angeles (2005–2014, 2016)	144 goals, 136 assists 7 times MLS Best XI
FW	(Bolivia) Jaime Moreno	D.C. United (1996–2002, 2004–10), MetroStars (2003)	133 goals, 102 assists 5 times MLS Best XI
FW	(United States) Brian McBride	Columbus Crew (1996–2003), Chicago Fire (2008–10)	80 goals

== See also ==
- MLS Best XI
