= 1992 FIFA Futsal World Championship squads =

This article lists the confirmed national futsal squads for the 1992 FIFA Futsal World Championship tournament held in Hong Kong, between 16 November and 28 November 1992.

== Group A ==
=== Argentina ===
No.	Pos.	Player	Date of birth (age)	Caps	Club
1	GK	Alberto Carfagna			
2	FP	Walter Fiele			
3	FP	Walter Sposaro			
4	FP	Gustavo Romero			
5	FP	Ruben Sosa			
6	FP	Fabio Gimenez			
7	FP	Pablo Parilla			
8	FP	Juan Avalos			
9	FP	Mauricio Ferraris			
10	FP	Marcelo Diaz			
11	FP	Gabriel Vilarin			
12	GK	Eduardo Socorro			

=== Hong Kong ===
Head coach: Vic Hermans

No.	Pos.	Player	Date of birth (age)	Caps	Club
1		Chung Ho Yin	15 April 1971		(Hong Kong) Kitchee
2		Chan Ping On (c)	9 August 1959		(Hong Kong) South China
3		Chu Yue Tai	23 September 1966		(Hong Kong) South China
4		Chan Chi Kwong	19 October 1964		(Hong Kong) Instant-Dict
5		Au Wai Lun	14 August 1971		(Hong Kong) Ernest Borel
6		Cheung Chi Tak	15 September 1958		(Hong Kong) Instant-Dict
7		Chiu Chun Ming	8 July 1964		(Hong Kong) Eastern
8		Tam Siu Wai	17 September 1970		(Hong Kong) Eastern
9		Wong Fuk Wing	20 January 1960		(Hong Kong) Sing Tao
10		Leslie Santos	20 July 1967		(Hong Kong) South China
11		Tam Ah Fook	2 August 1962		(Hong Kong) Ernest Borel
12		Chau Cheong Wa	17 February 1968		(Hong Kong) Happy Valley

=== Poland ===
Head coach: Krys Sobieski

== Group B ==
=== Iran ===
Head Coach:Mohammad Mayeli Kohan

No.	Pos.	Player	Date of birth (age)	Caps	Goals	Club
	FP	Saeid Rajabi	10 March 1965			(Iran) Gostaresh
	FP	Mohammad Habibi	8 January 1966			(Iran) Malavan
	GK	Vahid Ghelich	16 December 1957			(Iran) Persepolis
	FP	Mohammad Hassan Ansarifard	9 September 1962			(Iran) Persepolis
	FP	Mehdi Abtahi	2 March 1963			(Iran) Vahdat
	FP	Hamid Estili	1 April 1967			(Iran) PAS Tehran
	FP	Mohammad Khakpour	20 February 1969			(Iran) Persepolis
	FP	Hassan Shirmohammadi	22 May 1965			(Iran) Persepolis
	FP	Arash Noamouz	6 June 1967			(Iran) PAS Tehran
	FP	Asgar Akbari	12 April 1968			(Iran) Keshavarz

== Group C ==
=== Brazil ===
Head coach: Takão

No.	Pos.	Player	Date of birth (age)	Caps	Club
1	GK	Serginho Baptista	9 May 1964		(Brazil) Inpacel
2	DF	Serginho Schiochet	27 October 1960		(Brazil) SER Sadia
3	MF	Manoel Tobias	19 April 1971		(Brazil) Banfort
4	MF	Edinho	11 April 1966		(Brazil) Sumov
5	DF	Chiquinho	23 November 1965		(Brazil) Sumov
6	MF	Fininho	6 July 1972		(Brazil) Votorantim
7	DF	Ricardo Morillo	29 September 1966		(Brazil) Banespa
8	MF	Rogério Motta	30 May 1968		(Brazil) Banespa
9	FW	Jorginho Pimentel	10 October 1968		(Brazil) Banfort
10	GK	Mazureik	23 February 1963		(Brazil) Votorantim
11	FW	Luís Ortiz	8 May 1964		(Brazil) Sumov
12	MF	Vander Iacovino (c)	25 September 1965		(Brazil) Banfort

=== Costa Rica ===
Head coach: José Alberto Cubero Carmona

No.	Pos.	Player	Date of birth (age)	Caps	Club
1	GK	Francisco Alpízar	12 January 1959		(Costa Rica) UCR
2	DF	Geovanny Jara	20 July 1969		(Costa Rica) Herediano
3		Víctor Castro (footballer)	1 August 1959		(Costa Rica) Carmelita
4		Sergio Barrientos	9 June 1967		(Costa Rica) UCR
5		Gilberth Alpízar	7 January 1971		(Costa Rica) UCR
6		Daniel Knowlen	25 January 1963		(Costa Rica) Desamparados
7		José Carvajal (c)	31 March 1968		(Costa Rica) UCR
8		Miguel Ángel Porras	14 January 1966		(Costa Rica) UCR
9		Ricardo Gutiérrez	22 November 1961		(Costa Rica) UCR
10		Diego Solís	15 May 1962		(Costa Rica) UCR
11		Rolando Valverde	23 December 1969		(Costa Rica) Rescate Juvenil
12	GK	Ronald Castillo	19 August 1965		(Costa Rica) Calle Fallas

== Group D ==
=== United States ===
Head coach:

No.	Pos.	Player	Date of birth (age)	Caps	Club
1	GK	Victor Nogueira	17 July 1959 (age 33)		(United States) Milwaukee Wave
2	FW	George Fernandez	29 October 1961 (age 31)		(United States) Cleveland Crunch
3	MF	Andy Schmetzer	26 April 1967 (age 25)		(United States) Cleveland Crunch
4	DF	Jeff Agoos	2 May 1968 (age 24)		(United States) Dallas Sidekicks
5	DF	Michael Windischmann	6 December 1965 (age 26)		(United States) USSF
6	MF	Chico Borja	24 August 1959 (age 33)		(United States) USSF
7	FP	Jim Gabarra			
8	FP	Fernando Clavijo			
9	FP	Ted Eck			
10	FP	Terry Woodberry			
11	FP	Dale Ervine			
12	GK	Philip Johns			
