= Preki =

American soccer player and coach (born 1963)

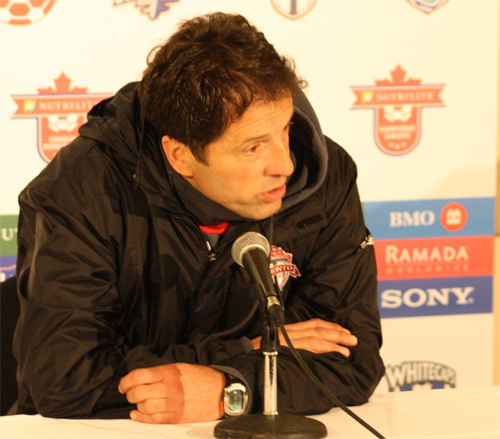
- Preki as head coach of Toronto FC in May 2010

Personal information
- Full name: Predrag Radosavljević
- Date of birth: June 24, 1963 (age 63)
- Place of birth: Belgrade, SR Serbia, SFR Yugoslavia
- Height: 5 ft 9 in (1.75 m)
- Position: Midfielder

Team information
- Current team: Seattle Sounders FC (assistant)

Youth career
- Čukarički

Senior career*
Years	Team	Apps	(Gls)
1982–1985	Red Star Belgrade	2	(0)
1985–1990	Tacoma Stars (indoor)	247	(209)
1990	Råslätts SK		
1990–1992	St. Louis Storm (indoor)	91	(113)
1992–1994	Everton	46	(4)
1994–1995	San Jose Grizzlies (indoor)	32	(67)
1994–1995	Portsmouth	40	(5)
1996–2000	Kansas City Wizards	145	(50)
2001	Miami Fusion	24	(8)
2002–2005	Kansas City Wizards	73	(21)
Total		330	(88)

International career
1996–2001	United States	28	(4)

Managerial career
- 2006: Chivas USA (assistant)
- 2007–2009: Chivas USA
- 2009–2010: Toronto FC
- 2014–2015: Sacramento Republic
- 2017: Saint Louis FC
- 2018–: Seattle Sounders FC (assistant)
Medal record
Men's Association football
Representing United States
CONCACAF Gold Cup
Runner-up	1998 United States
- * Club domestic league appearances and goals

Predrag Radosavljević (Serbian Cyrillic: Предраг Радосављевић; born June 24, 1963), better known by the nickname Preki (/ˈprɛki/), is a former soccer player and coach. He is currently an assistant coach with Seattle Sounders FC in Major League Soccer (MLS). He previously coached Sacramento Republic FC and Saint Louis FC in the United Soccer League and coached in MLS with Toronto FC and Chivas USA. Born in Yugoslavia, he represented the United States national team.

He played indoor soccer in the United States for over a decade, being considered among the best indoor players of all time. During his playing football career, he played for English clubs Everton and Portsmouth, and was an 'MLS original' upon the formation of MLS in 1996, playing for the Kansas City Wizards (now known as Sporting Kansas City) and Miami Fusion. He was the only two-time winner of the MLS MVP award, now known as the Landon Donovan MVP Award, until Lionel Messi achieved the feat in 2025 after also winning in 2024. He represented the United States at the 1998 FIFA World Cup. He was elected to the American National Soccer Hall of Fame in 2010.

In 2015 Preki left his managing role at Sacramento Republic FC by mutual consent. It was thought that he had landed the Leicester City FC job, but it was given to Claudio Ranieri.

== Playing career ==
=== Professional ===
Born in Belgrade, SR Serbia, Preki played briefly for Red Star Belgrade in the old Yugoslav First League after coming from FK Čukarički where he played in their youth team. In the summer of 1985, the Tacoma Stars head coach Bob McNab spotted Preki at an indoor tournament in Belgrade and sent him to the United States. He played five seasons for the Stars. During those years, he was a three-time First Team All Star, the 1988 and 1989 All Star Game MVP, led the league in assists in 1988 and scoring in 1989, and was the 1989 MISL MVP. During the summer of 1989, Preki began to consider becoming a U.S. citizen and returning to the outdoor game in order to make himself eligible for the U.S. national team. He played one season for Råslätts SK in Sweden in 1990. The Stars released Preki in July 1990 as part of a salary reduction move. In August, he signed with the St. Louis Storm. He played two seasons in St. Louis before being bought by Everton manager Howard Kendall for a fee of £100,000 in the summer of 1992 following a trial. He made 53 appearances for the Blues, 28 of those as a substitute. In June 1994, Preki signed with the San Jose Grizzlies of the Continental Indoor Soccer League where he rejoined Bob McNab from his Tacoma days. He played eight games, scoring sixteen goals, before returning to England in August 1994 to play for Portsmouth. On July 5, 1995, the Grizzlies purchased Preki's contract from Portsmouth. He was the CISL's second-leading scorer and league MVP.

=== Major League Soccer ===
Preki resumed outdoor play beginning with MLS's inaugural season in 1996 when he joined the Kansas City Wiz, renamed the Wizards after the 1996 season. The league allocated him to the Wiz on February 6, 1996. He was named to the MLS All-Star for five straight years between 1996 and 2000, being the MVP of the 1999 match after scoring a first-half brace to lead his side to a 6–4 win. In 1997, he won the scoring title with 41 points as well as the league MVP award. On 9 September 1998, Preki scored a hat-trick and made two assists against San Jose Earthquakes, tying a league record with eight points in a single game. In the opening match of the 2000 season, Preki scored his side's fourth goal in a 4–3 win over Chicago Fire, which proved to be crucial as both sides finished the 2000 regular season with a record-breaking 57 points, but the Wizards won the Supporters' Shield due to the goal difference. On 15 October, the 37-year-old Preki started in the 2000 MLS Cup, again against Chicago Fire, which ended in a 1–0 victory, being one of only three players, along with Mo Johnston and Uche Okafor, to have been a member of the inaugural Wizards team. The 2000 season still is the most successful in the club's history. Between 1996 and 2000, Preki scored a total of 50 goals in 145 appearances for Kansas City.

In 2001, Preki joined the Miami Fusion and scored eight goals and 14 assists in 24 games, thus playing a crucial role in the turnaround that saw the Fusion go from worst to first, winning his second Supporters Shield for the best regular season record in MLS. After spending the 2001 campaign with the Miami Fusion, Preki was able to rejoin his former club in the 2002 MLS Dispersal Draft, but only after every other team in the league had passed on selecting him. On 23 March 2002, he became MLS' all-time leading scorer with 223 points (65g, 93a), and finished that season as the team's leading scorer with 24 points (7g, 10a). On 31 May 2003, Preki notched two late goal contributions against New England Revolution to salvage a 2–2 away draw, marking the first time that Kansas City had come away with a road result after trailing by two goals with 20 minutes remaining. In 2003, the 40-year-old Preki played and started 30 games for the Wizards, logging nearly 2,700 minutes. His season total of 12 goals and 17 assists won him the MLS Most Valuable Player award, making him the oldest-ever winner of the award and also the only player alongside Lionel Messi to win the MLS MVP award more than once.

On 21 February 2004, Preki suffered a fractured fibula and dislocated left ankle during a preseason exhibition match and missed four months of the season, returning only in a 1–2 loss to Columbus Crew on 18 August. On 10 September, he underwent an arthroscopic surgery on his left ankle that ended his season, so he did not participate in Kansas' triumphant campaign in the 2004 U.S. Open Cup. He retired following the 2005 season, scoring a goal in the last minute of his final game with Kansas City to salvage a 2–2 draw with FC Dallas on 15 October, and in doing so at the age of 42 years and 111 days, he became both the oldest player and the oldest scorer in MLS history, although the appearance record has since been broken by Pat Onstad in 2011. He was named to the MLS All-Time Best XI after his retirement.

Preki is the only player to have won the MLS MVP Award and the MLS Scoring Champion Award (now respectively known as the Landon Donovan MVP Award and the MLS Golden Boot) twice, winning in 1997 and 2003, and is also the current all-time league leader in points with 270 (79 goals and 112 assists, plus another 25 points on 10 goals and 5 assists in the playoffs). Preki is still widely regarded as the greatest player in Kansas City's history, as he ranks first on career charts for both goals (79), and assists (112).

=== International ===
Originally from Yugoslavia, Preki was living and working in the U.S. in 1985 but when he was offered a spot on the U.S. national team he applied for U.S. citizenship which was granted on October 25, 1996. He made his debut for the United States on November 3, 1996, against Guatemala at the age of 33, making him one of the oldest players to make an international debut. Preki played a total of 28 games for the U.S., scoring four goals, one of them to beat Brazil at the 1998 Gold Cup. He made his last appearance for the national team in a 2–0 loss away to Costa Rica in World Cup qualifying on September 5, 2001.

=== International goals ===
#	Date	Venue	Opponent	Score	Result	Competition
1	December 21, 1996	San Salvador, El Salvador	Guatemala	1–0	2–2	1998 World Cup Qualifying
2	November 16, 1997	Foxborough, Massachusetts	El Salvador	4–2	4–2	1998 World Cup Qualifying
3	February 7, 1998	Oakland, California	Costa Rica	2–1	2–1	1998 CONCACAF Gold Cup
4	February 10, 1998	Los Angeles, California	Brazil	1–0	1–0	1998 CONCACAF Gold Cup

== Coaching career ==
Upon the appointment of Bob Bradley as the United States national team head coach, Preki was promoted as head coach of Chivas USA for the 2007 Major League Soccer season.

Preki left Chivas "by mutual consent" on November 12, 2009, following Chivas' failure to progress to the latter stages of the MLS playoffs. He became head coach of Toronto FC on November 19, 2009. However, Preki didn't last the 2010 MLS season with Toronto, being fired along with General Manager Mo Johnston on September 14, 2010. Under Preki, Toronto qualified for the 2010–11 CONCACAF Champions League after winning the 2010 Canadian Championship.

On July 15, 2013, after nearly three years out of coaching, Preki was named head coach of the USL Professional Division (now United Soccer League) expansion Sacramento Republic FC in advance of their inaugural 2014 season. He won the USL Pro Championship game in September 2014 with the club. On July 8, 2015, Preki announced his resignation from his post to take up a coaching role in the United Kingdom.

On October 12, 2016, USL club Saint Louis FC introduced Preki as its coach for the upcoming 2017 season. On November 20, 2017, Saint Louis FC relieved Preki of his coaching duties.

In January 2018, Preki was hired as an assistant coach to Brian Schmetzer with the Seattle Sounders FC.

=== Coaching record ===
As of November 19, 2017

Team	From	To	Record							
Team	From	To	G	W	L	T	GF	GA	GD	Win %
Chivas USA	January 17, 2007	November 12, 2009	107	41	36	30	132	125	+7	38.32
Toronto FC	November 19, 2009	September 14, 2010	32	11	11	10	30	31	−1	34.38
Sacramento Republic	July 15, 2013	July 8, 2015	53	33	15	5	108	60	+48	62.26
Saint Louis FC	October 12, 2016	November 19, 2017	35	11	15	9	41	53	−12	31.43
Total			227	96	77	54	311	269	+42	42.29

== Honors ==
=== Player ===
Red Star Belgrade

- Yugoslav First League: 1983–84

Tacoma Stars

- Major Indoor Soccer League runner-up: 1986–87
- Western Division Regular Season: 1986–87

Kansas City Wizards

- MLS Cup: 2000
- Supporters' Shield: 2000
- Western Conference Playoffs: 2004
- Western Conference Regular Season: 1997, 2000, 2004
- U.S. Open Cup: 2004

Miami Fusion

- Supporters' Shield: 2001
- Eastern Conference Regular Season: 2001

Individual

- Major Indoor Soccer League MVP: 1988–89
- Major Indoor Soccer League Scoring Champion: 1988–89
- MISL Pass Master (most assists): 1987–88, 1988–89
- MISL All-Star: 1989
- MISL All-Star Game MVP: 1989
- CISL MVP: 1995
- MLS All-Star: 1996, 1997, 1998, 1999, 2000
- MLS Best XI: 1996, 1997, 2001, 2003
- MLS MVP Award: 1997, 2003
- MLS Golden Boot: 1997, 2003
- CONCACAF Gold Cup Best XI: 1998
- MLS 50/50 Club
- National Soccer Hall of Fame: Class of 2010
- Indoor Soccer Hall of Fame: Class of 2013
- MLS 10th Anniversary Team

=== Manager ===
Chivas USA

- Western Conference Regular Season: 2007

Toronto FC

- Canadian Championship: 2009, 2010

Sacramento Republic

- USL Championship: 2014
- USL Playoffs: 2014, 2015

Seattle Sounders FC

- MLS Cup: 2019
- Western Conference Playoffs: 2019, 2020
- CONCACAF Champions League: 2022
- Leagues Cup: 2025
