= Jeff Agoos =

American soccer player and executive (born 1968)

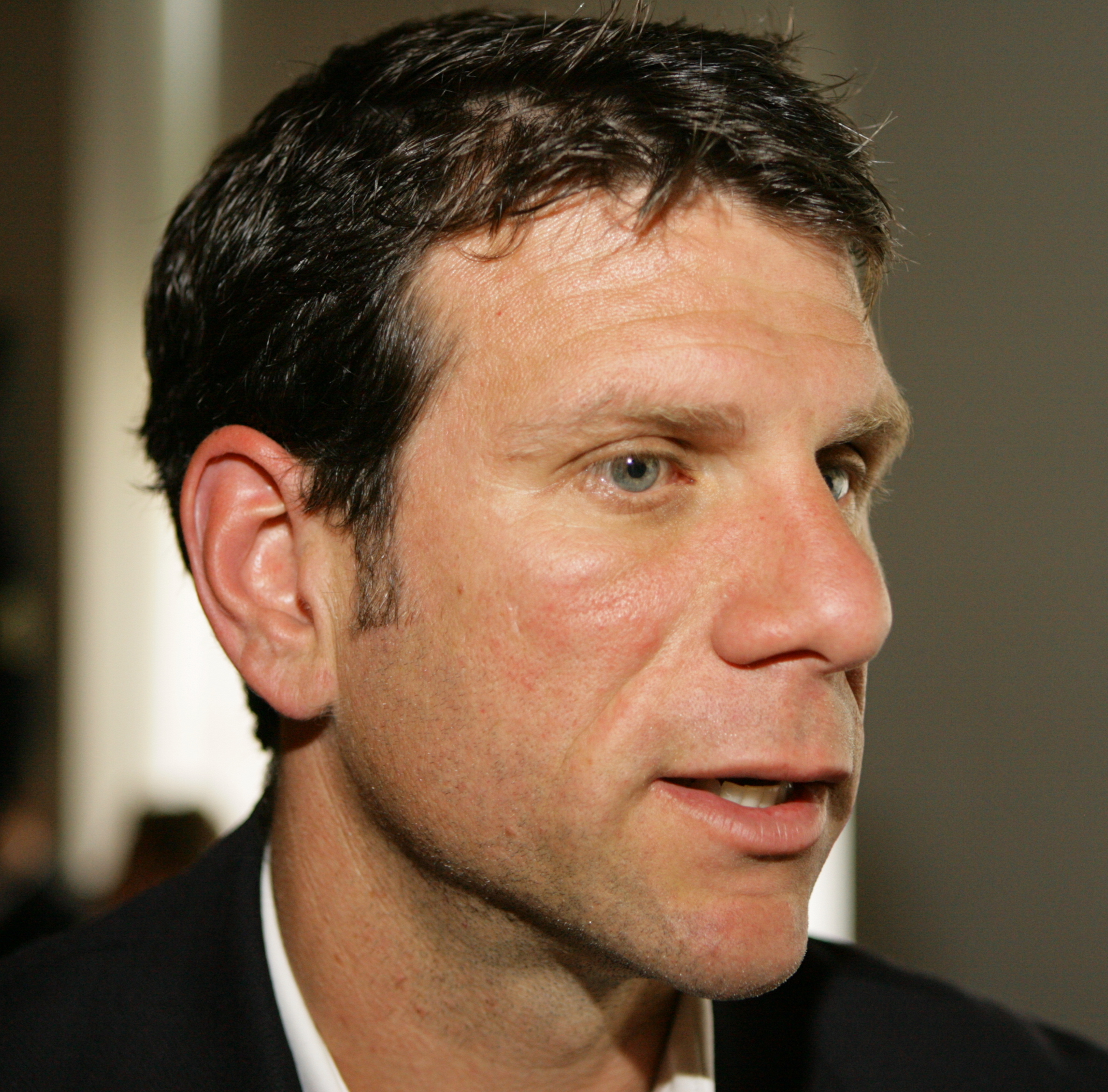
- Agoos in 2008

Personal information
- Full name: Jeffrey Alan Agoos
- Date of birth: May 2, 1968 (age 58)
- Place of birth: Geneva, Switzerland
- Height: 5 ft 10 in (1.78 m)
- Position: Defender

College career
Years	Team	Apps	(Gls)
1986–1990	University of Virginia		

Senior career*
Years	Team	Apps	(Gls)
1990	F.C. Dallas		
1991	Maryland Bays	5	(0)
1991–1992	Dallas Sidekicks (indoor)	30	(7)
1994	Los Angeles Salsa		
1994–1995	SV Wehen	9	(0)
1996–2000	D.C. United	115	(6)
2000	→ West Bromwich Albion (loan)	0	(0)
2001–2004	San Jose Earthquakes	84	(5)
2005	MetroStars	25	(0)

International career
2000	United States Olympic (O.P.)	6	(0)
1988–2003	United States	134	(4)

Managerial career
- 1995: University of Virginia (assistant)
Medal record
Men's Soccer
Representing United States
FIFA Futsal World Cup
Runner-up	1992 Hong Kong
CONCACAF Gold Cup
Winner	2002 United States
Runner-up	1998 United States
Third place	1996 United States
- * Club domestic league appearances and goals

Jeffrey Alan Agoos (born May 2, 1968) is a former professional soccer player who played as a defender. He is one of the all-time appearance leaders for the United States national team. Agoos won a record five MLS championships: three with D.C. United and two with the San Jose Earthquakes. He also won the 1996 U.S. Open Cup and was the 2001 MLS Defender of the Year. He was inducted into the National Soccer Hall of Fame in 2009.

Post-playing-career, Agoos served as the Technical Director and Sporting Director of the New York Red Bulls, and then Vice President of Competition for Major League Soccer. He is currently President and General Manager of Soccer Operations for Portland Thorns FC.

== Early life ==
Agoos (nicknamed Goose) was born in Geneva, Switzerland, as his father was working overseas there for Caterpillar Construction Company. He grew up in Texas, and attended J.J. Pearce High School in Richardson, Texas. He was named a two-time Parade Magazine High School All-American as well as a Dallas All-Sports Athlete-of-the-Year. Agoos is Jewish, and during the summer of 1985, represented the United States at the 1985 Maccabiah Games and was at 17 the youngest player on the team.

== Youth career ==
From 1986 to 1990, Agoos played soccer for Bruce Arena at the University of Virginia. During his four seasons with the Cavaliers, earned First-Team All-American honors twice, in 1988 and 1990 and is the only 4-time All American in Uva's history. He finished second in Hermann Award voting his senior season.

In 1989, his junior year, Virginia went to the NCAA championship game where it fought the Santa Clara University to a 1–1 draw after 4 overtimes. While the teams wanted to continue to play, NCAA officials ended the game and declared the two teams co-champions. At the time there were no penalty kicks to end a tie. At the end of the season, Agoos represented the United States at the 1989 Maccabiah Games.

== Club career ==
Upon graduating from college, Agoos played for the Maryland Bays of the A-League in 1991. On February 13, 1991, the Dallas Sidekicks of the Major Indoor Soccer League drafted Agoos with the second overall pick of the 1991 draft. He played in thirty games in the 1991–1992 season, scoring seven goals. In 1992, he left the Sidekicks to play full-time for the U.S. national team, but Dallas again selected him in a draft, this time the 1993 Continental Indoor Soccer League (CISL) draft, but he did not re-sign with the team. On June 26, 1994, after being cut from the U.S. roster for the 1994 FIFA World Cup, Agoos signed with the Los Angeles Salsa for the 1994 American Professional Soccer League season. The Salsa went to the playoff semifinals that season as Agoos was selected Second Team All League. In the fall of 1994, he moved to Germany, where he played for SV Wehen during the 1994–95 season.

=== Major League Soccer ===
Agoos returned from Germany in 1995 to sign with Major League Soccer. While waiting for the new league's first season, Agoos served as an assistant coach to Bruce Arena at the University of Virginia. In order to create a league, MLS allocated various recognized players to each team. As part of this process, the league allocated Agoos to D.C. United where he joined Bruce Arena, the team's first coach. That year, Agoos won the first MLS Championship as well as the U.S. Open Cup. He followed it up the next year with his second MLS Championship. In 1998, D.C. United achieved its greatest accomplishment when it defeated Vasco de Gama to take the Interamerican Cup. Agoos then won his third MLS Championship with D.C. United in 1999. He spent 2001 through 2004 with the San Jose Earthquakes, and proceeded to win his fourth and fifth MLS Championships. Agoos was named MLS Defender of the Year in 2001 and earned a place in the MLS Best XI three times (1997, 1999, and 2001). In 2005, Agoos was named to the league's tenth anniversary All-Time Best XI. He was traded to the MetroStars after the 2004 season for a fourth-round draft pick. In ten years in MLS, Agoos scored 11 regular-season goals and added 25 assists in 244 matches. In 2005, he was named to the MLS All-Time Best XI, before retiring December 8, 2005.

== International career ==
Agoos represented Team USA at the 1985 Maccabiah Games in Israel. At 17 years of age, he was the youngest player on the team.

Agoos made his debut with the United States national team on January 10, 1988, against Guatemala. His first national team goal came just three days later on January 13, 1988, also against Guatemala. He was the last member to be cut from the U.S. squad for the 1994 FIFA World Cup and he burned his uniform upon hearing the news. He made the squad for the 1998 FIFA World Cup in France but did not play a single minute, in favor of David Regis. In the 2002 World Cup in South Korea/Japan at the age of 34, Agoos started the first three games (he scored an own goal to finish the scoring in the surprising win against Portugal) until he suffered a calf injury against Poland, and then missed the rest of the tournament. He was capped a total of 134 times for the U.S., earning his last cap against Wales on May 26, 2003.

Agoos was also a member of the 1992 Team USA Futsal team which won a silver medal at the 1992 FIFA Futsal World Championship in Hong Kong. He earned ten caps and scored two goals with the futsal team.

== Post-playing career ==
Agoos was named as New York Red Bulls' Technical Director on September 28, 2006, serving under head coach Bruce Arena. He officially joined the Bulls organization on January 1, 2007. On January 7, 2008, he was promoted to Sporting Director.

In 2009 Agoos was inducted into the National Soccer Hall of Fame.

On March 28, 2011, Agoos was hired by MLS as their Technical Director of Competition. He will work on planning and competition strategies.

In January 2025, Agoos was announced as the President and General Manager of Soccer Operations for Portland Thorns FC, a team in the National Women's Soccer League.

== Career statistics ==
=== Club ===
Appearances and goals by club, season and competition
Club	Season	League			National Cup		League Cup		Continental		Other		Total	
Club	Season	Division	Apps	Goals	Apps	Goals	Apps	Goals	Apps	Goals	Apps	Goals	Apps	Goals
SV Wehen	1994–95	Regionalliga Süd	9	0							–			
D.C. United	1996	Major League Soccer	32	1							6	0		
D.C. United	1997	Major League Soccer	29	1							5	0		
D.C. United	1998	Major League Soccer	21	1							6	1		
D.C. United	1999	Major League Soccer	30	2							6	0		
D.C. United	2000	Major League Soccer	23	1							0	0		
D.C. United	Total		115	6							23	1		
San Jose Earthquakes	2001	Major League Soccer	20	2							6	0		
San Jose Earthquakes	2002	Major League Soccer	12	0							2	0		
San Jose Earthquakes	2003	Major League Soccer	28	2							4	1		
San Jose Earthquakes	2004	Major League Soccer	24	1							2	0		
San Jose Earthquakes	Total		84	5							14	1		
MetroStars	2005	Major League Soccer	25	0							2	0		
Career total			233	11							39	2		

=== International ===
Scores and results list the United States' goal tally first, score column indicates score after each Agoos goal.

List of international goals scored by Jeff Agoos
No.	Date	Venue	Opponent	Score	Result	Competition
1	January 13, 1988	Guatemala City, Guatemala	Guatemala	1–0	1–0	Friendly
2	November 14, 1993	Mission Viejo, California, United States	Cayman Islands	4–0	8–1	Friendly
3	January 20, 1996	Los Angeles, United States	Guatemala	2–0	3–0	1996 CONCACAF Gold Cup
4	February 2, 2002	Pasadena, California, United States	Costa Rica	2–0	2–0	2002 CONCACAF Gold Cup final

== Honors ==
Virginia Cavaliers

- NCAA Division I: 1989

F.C. Dallas

- Northern Division: 1990

Maryland Bays

- Western Conference: 1991

D.C. United

- MLS Cup: 1996, 1997, 1999
- Supporters' Shield: 1997, 1999
- Eastern Conference Playoffs: 1996, 1997, 1998, 1999
- Eastern Conference Regular Season: 1997, 1998, 1999
- U.S. Open Cup: 1996
- CONCACAF Champions' Cup: 1998
- InterAmerican Cup: 1998

San Jose Earthquakes

- MLS Cup: 2001, 2003
- Western Conference Playoff: 2003
- Western Conference Regular Season: 2003

United States

- CONCACAF Gold Cup: 2002
- FIFA Futsal World Cup runner-up: 1992

Individual

- APSL Honorable Mention All League: 1991
- MLS All-Star: 1996, 1997, 1998, 1999, 2000
- MLS Best XI: 1997, 1999, 2001
- MLS Defender of the Year Award: 2001
- MLS 25 Greatest
- MLS All-Time Best XI
- D.C. United Hall of Tradition: 2008
- National Soccer Hall of Fame: 2009

== See also ==
- List of United States men's international soccer players born outside the United States
- List of men's footballers with 100 or more international caps
- List of select Jewish soccer players

Sporting positions
Preceded by John Doyle	San Jose Earthquakes captain 2001–2004	Succeeded by Wade Barrett
