= Marco Etcheverry =

Bolivian footballer (born 1970)

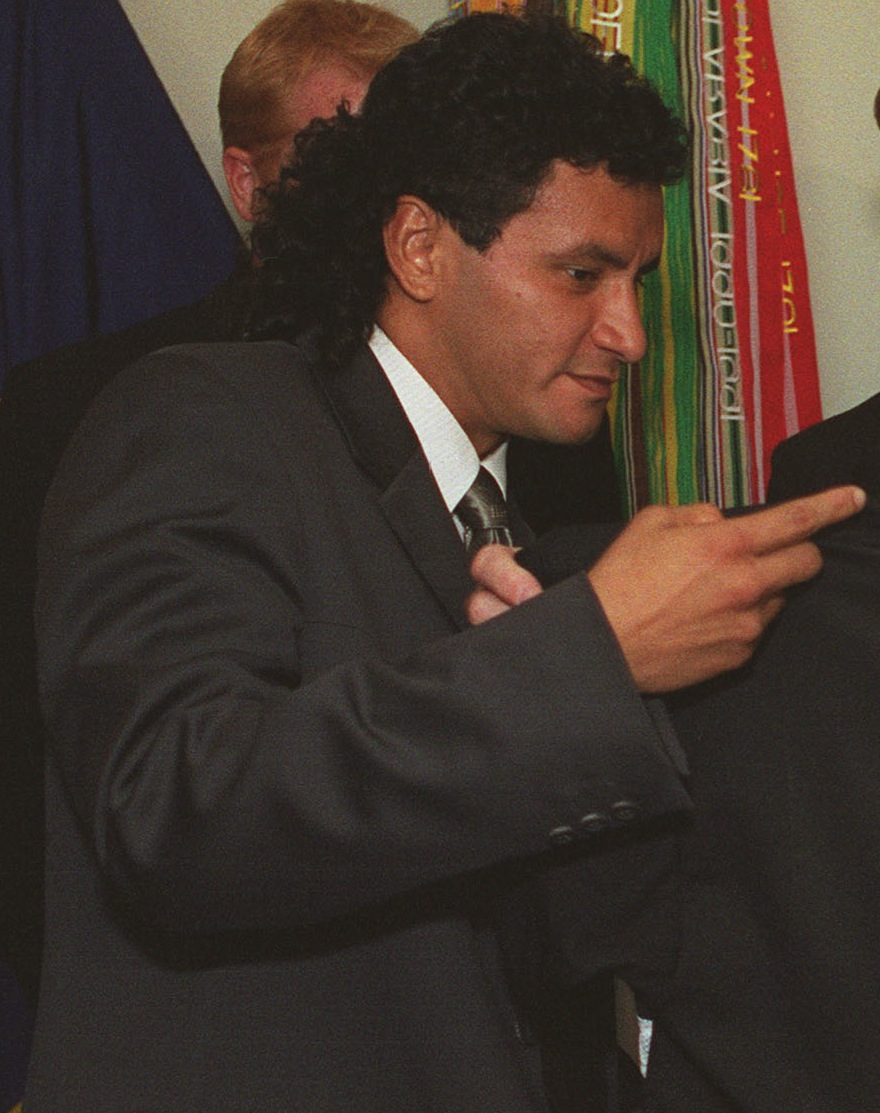
- Etcheverry in 2000

Personal information
- Full name: Marco Antonio Etcheverry Vargas
- Date of birth: 26 September 1970 (age 56)
- Place of birth: Santa Cruz de la Sierra, Bolivia
- Height: 1.79 m (5 ft 10 in)
- Position: Midfielder

Youth career
- 1984–1986: Tahuichi Academy

Senior career*
Years	Team	Apps	(Gls)
1986–1987	Destroyers	81	(17)
1987–1991	Bolívar	41	(21)
1991–1992	Albacete	15	(2)
1993–1994	Colo-Colo	28	(8)
1994–1995	América de Cali	21	(0)
1996–2003	D.C. United	191	(34)
1997	→ Barcelona SC (loan)	13	(6)
1998	→ Emelec (loan)	6	(0)
1999	→ Barcelona SC (loan)		
2001	→ Oriente (loan)	4	(1)
2004	Bolívar	7	(0)

International career
1989–2003	Bolivia	71	(13)

Managerial career
- 2008: United States U20 (assistant)
- 2009: Aucas
- 2023: D.C. United (academy)
- * Club domestic league appearances and goals

Marco Antonio Etcheverry Vargas (born 26 September 1970) is a Bolivian former professional footballer who played as a forward or midfielder. A creative playmaker, he is considered one of the greatest Bolivian players of all time. Etcheverry played for D.C. United of Major League Soccer from 1996 to 2003. He helped D.C United win eight trophies during that time, and was nominated to the MLS Best XI in four consecutive seasons from 1996 to 1999.

== Club career ==
Nicknamed El Diablo (The Devil), Etcheverry was trained at Bolivia's Tahuichi Academy, after which he played professionally with Bolivian sides (Destroyers, Bolívar, Oriente Petrolero), Spain (Albacete), Chile (Colo-Colo), Colombia (América de Cali) and Ecuador (Barcelona, Emelec).

Etchverry joined D.C. United of Major League Soccer in its 1st season of 1996, and led the team to three MLS Cups and was named MLS MVP in 1998. In eight years with the team, Etcheverry played 191 league games, scoring 34 goals and registering 101 assists (the games and assists were DC records). He retired at the end of the 2003 season.

=== DC United honors ===
In 2005, he was named to the MLS All-Time Best XI.

On 23 September 2006, Etcheverry was honored at a home game against the New York Red Bulls. During halftime he was put up on the "D.C. United Tradition of Excellence" sign in the stadium. After all of this Etcheverry walked over to the La Barra Brava part of the stadium and did his trademark clap in front of them, he did after every game, win or lose.

On 20 October 2007, Etcheverry was honored with a tribute match at RFK Stadium, prior to United's regular-season finale versus Columbus. Etcheverry is the first United player to be so honored. Etcheverry, playing with teammates from the club's 1997 MLS Cup winning side, defeated Hollywood United (a collection of former players and actors), 2–1, with Etcheverry drawing and scoring the winning penalty in the final minute.

== International career ==
Etcheverry compiled 71 caps and scored 13 goals for the Bolivia national team between 1989 and 2003. He scored four times during qualification for the 1994 FIFA World Cup, including an 88th minute opening goal in a 2–0 defeat of Brazil in La Paz - the first ever loss by the Seleção in World Cup qualifying, to help Bolivia participate in its first FIFA World Cup since 1950. At the tournament finals, Etcheverry was sent off for kicking Lothar Matthäus four minutes after appearing as a substitute in the tournament's opening game against Germany. The subsequent suspension meant that Etcheverry played no further part in Bolivia's tournament, as La Verde finished bottom of Group C with two losses and a draw to South Korea.

Etcheverry scored twice in the 1997 Copa América as Bolivia reached the final to achieve its best performance in the competition since winning in 1963. He went on to represent the team in the subsequent FIFA Confederations Cup in 1999.

On 12 April 2006, the Bolivian Congress awarded him with the "Order of Merit" and a title of "Distinguished Citizen", for his sport achievements, shortly after his retirement.

== Style of play ==
Etcheverry was a left-footed attacking and central midfielder.

== Coaching career ==
Etcheverry made his debut as football coach in early 2008 after he accepted an offer from second division club Sociedad Deportiva Aucas, but he was sacked after only four months in charge. On 6 October 2009, Etcheverry was announced as the new Oriente Petrolero coach, replacing Pablo Sánchez. But in the middle of the negotiations he decided not to go through.

He returned to the United States in 2023 to coach the under-15 boys' team for the D.C. United Academy.

=== International goals ===
Scores and results list Bolivia's goal tally first, score column indicates score after each Etcheverry goal.

List of international goals scored by Marco Etcheverry
No.	Date	Venue	Opponent	Score	Result	Competition
1	20 June 1993	Estadio 9 de Mayo, Machala, Ecuador	Colombia	1–0	1–1	1993 Copa América
2	25 July 1993	Estadio Hernando Siles, La Paz, Bolivia	Brazil	1–0	2–0	1994 World Cup qualification
3	8 August 1993	Estadio Hernando Siles, La Paz, Bolivia	Uruguay	2–0	3–1	1994 World Cup qualification
4	22 August 1993	Estadio Hernando Siles, La Paz, Bolivia	Venezuela	5–0	7–0	1994 World Cup qualification
5	22 August 1993	Estadio Hernando Siles, La Paz, Bolivia	Venezuela	6–0	7–0	1994 World Cup qualification
6	11 July 1995	Estadio Parque Artigas, Paysandú, Uruguay	United States	1–0	1–0	1995 Copa América
7	25 October 1995	Estadio Ramón Aguilera, Santa Cruz, Bolivia	Ecuador	1–0	2–2	Friendly
8	14 February 1996	Estadio Olímpico Patria, Sucre, Bolivia	Paraguay	4–1	4–1	Friendly
9	7 July 1996	Estadio Hernando Siles, La Paz, Bolivia	Venezuela	2–0	6–1	1998 FIFA World Cup qualification
10	12 January 1997	Estadio Hernando Siles, La Paz, Bolivia	Ecuador	2–0	2–0	1998 FIFA World Cup qualification
11	15 June 1997	Estadio Hernando Siles, La Paz, Bolivia	Peru	1–0	2–0	1997 Copa América
12	21 June 1997	Estadio Hernando Siles, La Paz, Bolivia	Colombia	1–0	2–1	1997 Copa América
13	20 July 1997	Estadio Hernando Siles, La Paz, Bolivia	Uruguay	1–0	1–0	1998 FIFA World Cup qualification

== Honours ==
Bolivar

- Bolivian League Championship: 1991

Colo-Colo

- Chilean Primera División: 1993
- Copa Chile: 1994

D.C. United

- MLS Cup: 1996, 1997, 1999
- Supporters' Shield: 1997, 1999
- U.S. Open Cup: 1996
- CONCACAF Champions' Cup: 1998
- Copa Interamericana: 1998

Barcelona SC

- Ecuadorian League Championship: 1997

Oriente Petrolero

- Bolivian League Championship: 2001

Bolivia Youth

- South American U-17 Championship: 1986

Bolivia

- Copa América runner-up: 1997

Individual

- South American Team of the Year: 1993
- MLS All-Star: 1996, 1997, 1998, 1999
- MLS Best XI: 1996, 1997, 1998, 1999
- MLS Goal of the Year: 1997, 1999
- MLS MVP: 1998
- MLS Cup MVP: 1996
- MLS All-Star Game MVP: 2002
- MLS All-Time Best XI
- D.C. United Hall of Tradition: 2007
- Washington DC Sports Hall of Fame: 2016
- National Soccer Hall of Fame: 2022
- Copa América Historical Dream Team: 2011
