= Tony Meola =

American soccer player

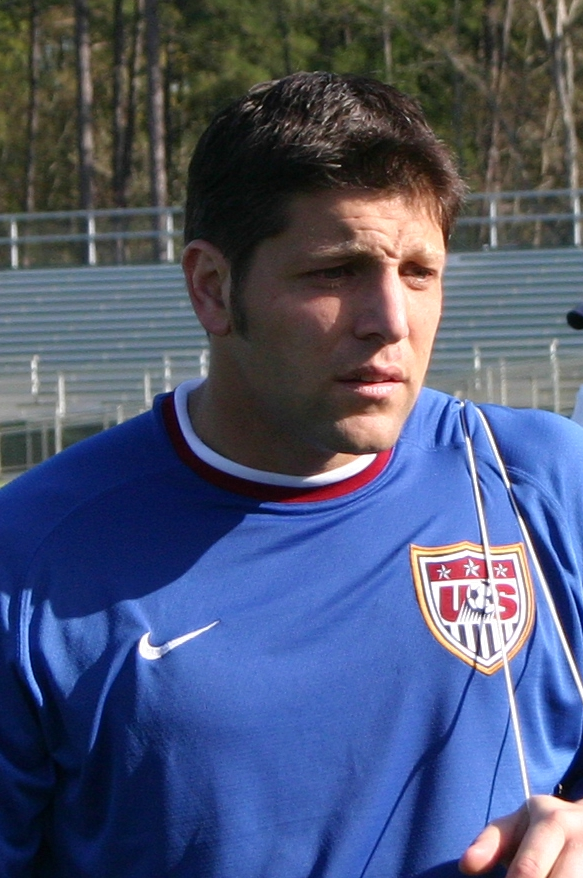
- Meola in 2006

Personal information
- Full name: Antonio Michael Meola
- Date of birth: February 21, 1969 (age 57)
- Place of birth: Belleville, New Jersey, U.S.
- Height: 6 ft 1 in (1.85 m)
- Position: Goalkeeper

College career
Years	Team	Apps	(Gls)
1988–1989	Virginia Cavaliers		

Senior career*
Years	Team	Apps	(Gls)
1990	Brighton & Hove Albion	2	(0)
1990	Watford	0	(0)
1991	Fort Lauderdale Strikers	7	(0)
1994–1995	Buffalo Blizzard (indoor)	12	(0)
1995	Long Island Rough Riders	14	(0)
1996–1998	New York/New Jersey MetroStars	90	(0)
1999–2004	Kansas City Wizards	125	(0)
2005–2006	New York Red Bulls	35	(0)
2007–2008	New Jersey Ironmen (indoor)	24	(0)
Total		309	(0)

International career^{‡}
1988–2006	United States	100	(0)

Managerial career
- 2015–2016: Jacksonville Armada
Medal record
Representing United States
Winner	CONCACAF Gold Cup	1991
Winner	CONCACAF Gold Cup	2002
Runner-up	CONCACAF Gold Cup	1993
Men's Soccer
- * Club domestic league appearances and goals as of October 20, 2008 ‡ National team caps and goals as of November 24, 2006

Antonio Michael Meola (/miˈoʊlə/; Italian: [ˈmɛːola]; born February 21, 1969) is an American former professional soccer player who played as a goalkeeper. He represented the United States national team at the 1990, 1994, and 2002 World Cups. From 1996 to 2006, he played in Major League Soccer, the U.S. top soccer division, where he obtained multiple honors. Meola was a radio host on SiriusXM FC until September of 2026.

== Early life ==
Meola was born in Belleville, New Jersey. He grew up in Kearny. He played boys' soccer for Kearny High School. He learned his love for the game from his father, Vincenzo, who played for Italian second division club Avellino before immigrating to the U.S. Meola was All-State both as a goalkeeper (1985) and a forward (1986). He had a part in 41 clean sheets and scored 42 goals during his high school career.

In 1989, Meola was named by The Star-Ledger as one of the top ten New Jersey high school soccer players of the 1980s. Meola not only excelled at soccer, he was a three-sport varsity letterman. He was the captain of the school's basketball team and was named an All-State baseball player in 1987. The New York Yankees drafted him out of high school, though Meola did not sign a contract with them.

== College ==
Meola attended the University of Virginia on a soccer/baseball athletic scholarship. While at Virginia, he played under coach Bruce Arena. By the time he was playing for the Cavaliers, he had already begun to make a name for himself on the international scene. In October 1987, he backstopped the U.S. U-20 national team at the 1987 FIFA World Youth Championship. He earned first team All American honors both his freshman and sophomore years. He also won the Hermann Trophy as a freshman in 1988 and the MAC Award as a sophomore in 1989. On December 15, 1989, he announced that he was leaving UVA to pursue a career with the U.S. national team.

Meola also lettered for the UVA Cavaliers baseball team his freshman year of 1988 as a third baseman.

== Professional career ==
=== Early soccer career ===
Meola had signed with the U.S. Soccer Federation before the 1990 FIFA World Cup. Following the cup, Meola signed on loan with English second division club Brighton & Hove Albion where he played eleven games; only two were league games. He gained his first start when he replaced the injured Perry Digweed and promptly won man of the match honors. On September 14, 1990, Meola was transferred to second division club Watford before moving back to the U.S., which he did when he was unable to renew his work permit due to his inability to gain first team time with Watford.

In 1991, Meola played for the Fort Lauderdale Strikers of the American Professional Soccer League. He shared the goal with Arnie Mausser.

=== American football and acting ===
Meola attempted to become a placekicker with NFL's New York Jets in July 1994, was paid $29,000 signing bonus.

Although Meola signed with the Buffalo Blizzard of the NPSL on December 14, 1994, for the 1994–95 indoor season and became the team's starting keeper, he left in mid-February 1995, as he had taken a lead role in the off-Broadway play Tony and Tina's Wedding and needed to join the cast.

=== United Soccer Leagues ===
In February 1995, Meola joined the Long Island Rough Riders for its upcoming 1995 USISL season. That year the Rough Riders claimed the USISL championship.

=== MetroStars ===
Meola spent three weeks in February 1996 training with Italian club Parma. Upon the creation of Major League Soccer, he was allocated to the NY/NJ MetroStars, for whom he played between 1996 and 1998, starting almost every game. During his time with the MetroStars, he set a league record with nine shutouts in 1996. He did not win the MLS Goalkeeper of the Year Award, however; the honor went to Mark Dodd.

=== Kansas City Wizards ===
Meola was traded to the Kansas City Wizards (with Alexi Lalas for Mark Chung and Mike Ammann) in 1999, but missed most of his first year in the midwest due to injury. Chris Snitko and David Winner backstopped during Meola's absence. The team struggled for results and wins with both Winner and Snitko.

In 2000, Meola was named League MVP, Goalkeeper of the Year, and MLS Cup MVP as he led Kansas City to the championship. He set a new league record by recording 16 shutouts. Meola was voted into the 2000 MLS All Star Game playing the first half in goal, and made a cameo in the 2nd half up top as a forward.

Meola played for the Wizards through the 2004 MLS season. That year, an injury forced him out of contention. Bo Oshoniyi took over the goalkeeping position, although Meola recorded a shutout in the Wizards' U.S. Open Cup final win over the Chicago Fire, and Meola was not asked back for next season, instead stuck with Oshoniyi as the starting goalkeeper.

=== MetroStars/Red Bulls return ===
Meola was re-acquired by the MetroStars in June 2005. He was named to the MLS All-Time Best XI after the season. Following the 2006 season, Meola was waived by the team, now known as the New York Red Bulls.

=== New Jersey Ironmen ===
Meola signed a contract in summer 2007 with the New Jersey Ironmen, an indoor soccer expansion team based in Newark, NJ that played in the Major Indoor Soccer League. As starting goalie, Meola led the team to the playoffs in its first year.

== International career ==
Meola made his U.S. national team debut on June 10, 1988, against Ecuador. Meola's second cap came in a June 4, 1989 victory over Peru in the Marlboro Cup which won the U.S. the cup. The team took the trophy to the Scots-American Club in Kearny, New Jersey. After the party, Meola drove back to the team's hotel, dropped the trophy at the front desk and drove home. As he remembers it, "A week later Doug Newman called me up and asked where the cup was. I told him I'd left it at for him at the hotel. . . . I'm sure they got it back. Back then there weren't too many cups in U.S. Soccer."

Later in the summer, the national team went on a tour of Italy, playing several Serie A teams. At the time, David Vanole was the main goalkeeper of the U.S., but over the previous month, he had fought with the U.S. Soccer Federation over a contract dispute and traded his place on the field with Meola to get his burgeoning weight under control. U.S. coach Bob Gansler wanted to start Meola against A.S. Roma, but Meola was injured in a freak accident when a ball struck his head during practice. Vanole started in his place, but let in three goals in a 4-3 U.S. victory. This bad performance led Gansler to drop Vanole, who never again played for the U.S., thus making Meola an undisputed starter between the sticks. He played the remaining qualifying games for the 1990 FIFA World Cup, including the famous 1–0 victory over Trinidad and Tobago that sealed a spot for the U.S. in the final tournament, where he also played every minute in goal.

Meola remained the keeper of choice for the U.S. national team from 1990 through the 1994 FIFA World Cup. At that tournament, his play and ponytail made him a recognizable face around the country. After the U.S. loss to Brazil in the second round of the World Cup, Meola informed the U.S. coach Bora Milutinović that he intended to pursue a professional American football career as a placekicker. Milutinović never called Meola back to the U.S. team. In a 2024 interview with CBS, Meola claimed that this lack of callback was actually related to leave he took for family reasons and that an unnamed USSF official effectively told him he was being blackballed as a result.

It was not until January 1999 that Meola again played for the U.S. By that time, Kasey Keller and Brad Friedel were competing for the starting goalkeeper spot on the team and Meola never regained the first team place he had enjoyed in the early 1990s. However, he continued to play for the U.S. and earned his 100th cap in 2006. He was the third-choice goalkeeper at the 2002 FIFA World Cup behind Friedel and Keller.

== Coach ==
=== Jacksonville Armada ===
On November 24, 2015, Meola was hired for his first coaching position in the NASL with Jacksonville Armada FC. Meola recorded his first managerial victory in the club's home opener against Miami FC on April 15, 2016. Meola was fired on August 7, 2016, after posting an overall record of 2W-6D-10L, including a 1-2-5 record in the Fall Season and 1-4-5 showing in the Spring Season.

=== Coaching record ===
As of August 7, 2016

Team	From	To	Record				
Team	From	To	G	W	L	T	Win %
Jacksonville Armada	November 24, 2015	August 7, 2016	18	2	10	6	11.11
Total			18	2	10	6	11.11

== Personal life ==
Meola's non-soccer ventures include appearing off-Broadway in Tony and Tina's Wedding in 1995, and running his own mortgage firm.

Meola was the original drummer for New Jersey cover band Mushmouth and still plays with the band on occasion.

A soccer video game for the SNES with Meola's name, Tony Meola's Sidekicks Soccer (also known as Super Copa in Latin America and Ruy Ramos' World Wide Soccer in Japan), was released in 1993.

In 2012, Meola was inducted into the National Soccer Hall of Fame.

Meola now lives in Toms River, New Jersey and has three children, Jon, Kylie, and Aidan. Jon Meola was a member of the University of Virginia baseball team during the 2016 season, before transferring to Stetson University. His son Aidan is a member of the Oklahoma State Cowboys baseball team.

== Broadcasting ==
Meola worked on beIN Sports coverage of Copa America. He also commentates on MLS games for FOX when their lead commentators are unavailable.

In 2018, he was a featured commentator on FOX and FS1 for their United States broadcasts of the FIFA World Cup. In 2020, he was named as the color commentator for the Chicago Fire FC.

== Career statistics ==
Club performance			League		Cup		League Cup		Continental		Total	
Season	Club	League	Apps	Goals	Apps	Goals	Apps	Goals	Apps	Goals	Apps	Goals
United States			League		Open Cup		League Cup		North America		Total	
1996	NY/NJ MetroStars	Major League Soccer	29	0	3	0					32	0
1997	NY/NJ MetroStars	Major League Soccer	30	0	0	0	3	0			33	0
1998	NY/NJ MetroStars	Major League Soccer	31	0	2	0	3	0			36	0
1999	Kansas City Wizards	Major League Soccer	9	0	0	0	0	0			9	0
2000	Kansas City Wizards	Major League Soccer	31	0	7	0					38	0
2001	Kansas City Wizards	Major League Soccer	17	0	3	0					20	0
2002	Kansas City Wizards	Major League Soccer	17	0	3	0					20	0
2003	Kansas City Wizards	Major League Soccer	30	0	3	0					33	0
2004	Kansas City Wizards	Major League Soccer	21	0	0	0	1	0			22	0
2005	New York Red Bulls	Major League Soccer	15	0	2	0					17	0
2006	New York Red Bulls	Major League Soccer	20	0							20	0
Total	United States		250	0	23	0	7	0			280	0
Career total			250	0	23	0	7	0			280	0

== Honors ==
Virginia Cavaliers

- NCAA Division I: 1989
- Conference Tournament: 1988
- Conference Regular Season: 1988, 1989

Fort Lauderdale Strikers

- American Conference: 1991

Long Island Rough Riders

- USISL Pro League: 1995
- Coastal Conference: 1995

Kansas City Wizards

- MLS Cup: 2000
- Supporters' Shield: 2000
- Western Conference (Playoffs): 2004
- Western Conference (Regular Season): 2000, 2004

United States

- CONCACAF Gold Cup: 1991, 2002

Individual

- Division I First-Team All-American: 1988, 1989
- Hermann Trophy: 1989
- MAC Award: 1989
- MLS All-Star: 1996, 1997, 1998, 2000
- MLS Goalkeeper of the Year: 2000
- MLS Most Valuable Player: 2000
- MLS Cup Most Valuable Player: 2000
- MLS Comeback Player of the Year Award: 2000
- MLS 10th Anniversary Team
- National Soccer Hall of Fame: 2012

== See also ==
- List of men's footballers with 100 or more international caps
