= Mark Chung (soccer) =

American soccer player

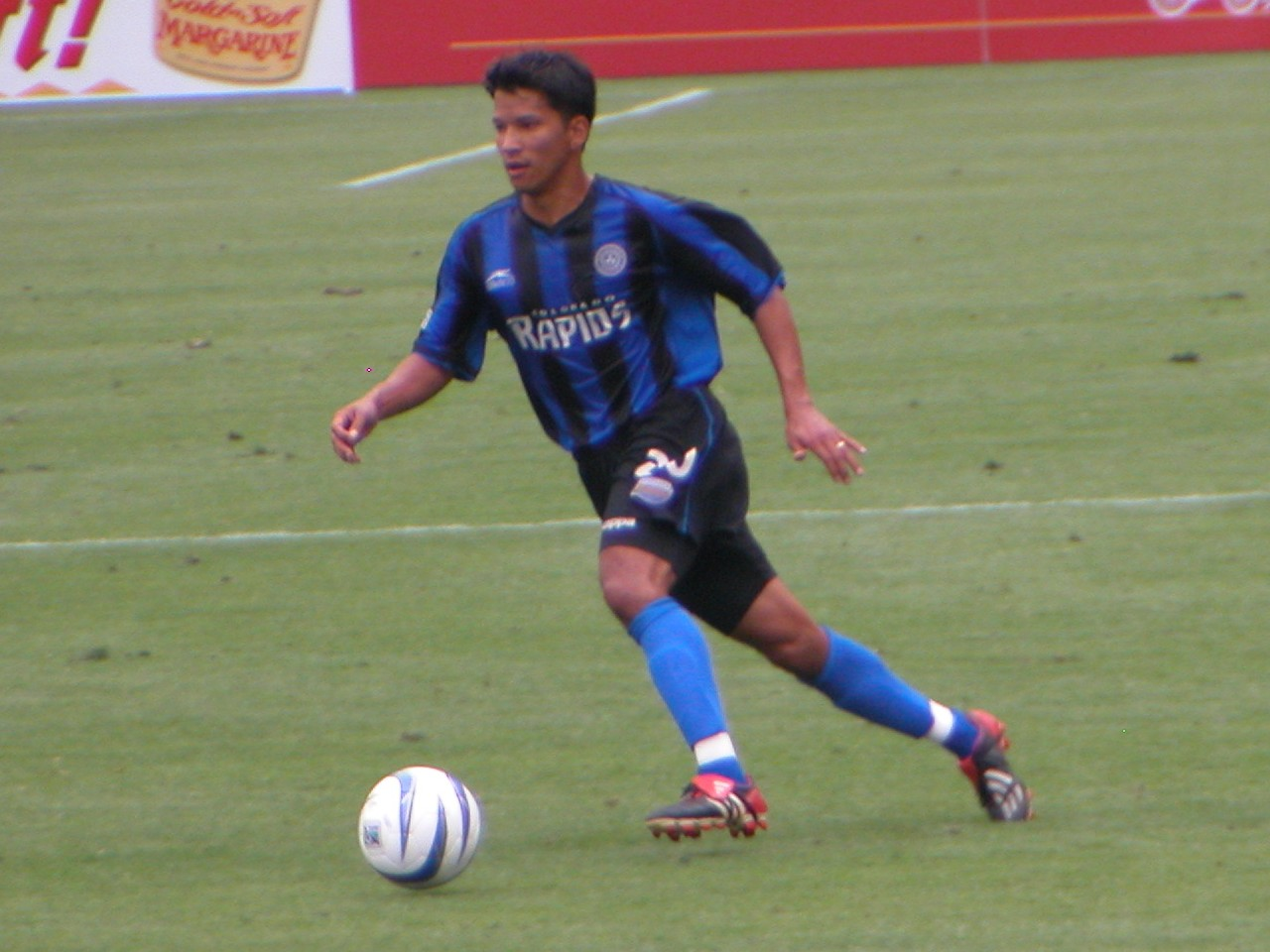
- Chung with the Colorado Rapids in 2007

Personal information
- Full name: Mark Chung
- Date of birth: June 18, 1970 (age 56)
- Place of birth: Toronto, Ontario, Canada
- Height: 5 ft 7 in (1.70 m)
- Position: Midfielder

College career
Years	Team	Apps	(Gls)
1988–1992	South Florida Bulls		

Senior career*
Years	Team	Apps	(Gls)
1995	San Diego Sockers (indoor)	28	(29)
1996–1998	Kansas City Wizards	101	(21)
1999–2001	MetroStars	90	(11)
2002–2005	Colorado Rapids	93	(27)
2005	San Jose Earthquakes	26	(6)
2008	Treasure Coast Galleons	1	(0)
Total		339	(94)

International career
1992–1998	United States	24	(2)
- * Club domestic league appearances and goals

Mark Chung (born June 18, 1970) is a former professional soccer player who played ten seasons in Major League Soccer. Born in Canada, he earned twenty-four caps, scoring two goals, with the US national team.

== Youth ==
Chung was born in Toronto to Hakka Chinese Jamaican parents. His family moved from Toronto to Pembroke Pines, Florida, when Chung was twelve. These moves created a choice for Chung when he received invitations to play from three national teams, the United States, Canada and Jamaica. He ultimately elected to play for the US. After graduating from Cooper City High School, Chung attended the University of South Florida where he studied finance. He also played on the men's soccer team from 1988 to 1992, finishing his collegiate soccer career with twenty-five assists. Chung is the cousin of the Jamaican international footballer Craig Ziadie.

== Professional ==
In 1995, Chung played with the San Diego Sockers of the Continental Indoor Soccer League (CISL). He scored twenty-nine goals en route to being named the league's Rookie of the Year. Chung was drafted in the first round (sixth overall) by the Kansas City Wizards in the MLS Inaugural Draft, and finished 1996 with eight goals and nine assists. Chung would be a mainstay at Kansas City for the next two years, was named to his first MLS Best XI in 1997, and would lead all of MLS in games played at the end of its first three seasons, with 97. After 1998, Kansas City traded Chung to the MetroStars, with Mike Ammann in exchange for Tony Meola and Alexi Lalas. He would play with the MetroStars for the next three seasons, but was greatly underused by Metro coach Octavio Zambrano. Chung called the role he played with the Metros an "idiot left wing". He was traded again before the 2002 season, this time to the Colorado Rapids in exchange for a draft pick. Chung was very successful with the Rapids, making MLS Best XI's in both 2002 and 2003. However, with a coaching change to Fernando Clavijo in 2005, he became unhappy, and requested a trade. The wish was granted, as Chung was sent to San Jose for an allocation. In ten years of MLS league play, he scored 61 goals and added 76 assists.

Chung retired after the Quakes moved to Houston after the 2006 season. Upon his retirement, he had played in 278 league matches. In 2008, he played one game with the Treasure Coast Galleons of the Florida Elite Soccer League.

== National team ==
Despite a significant amount of success in MLS, Chung never had a significant role in the US national team. Chung made his first appearance April 4, 1992 against his ancestral country, China, but in total made only 24 appearances, and scored only two goals. He was the first of two Chinese-American players to play for the US, the second being Brian Ching.

== Honors ==
Individual

- MLS All-Star: 1997, 1999, 2000
- MLS Best XI: 1997, 2002, 2003
- MLS Fair Play Award: 1997
