= Piotr Nowak =

Polish footballer (born 1964)

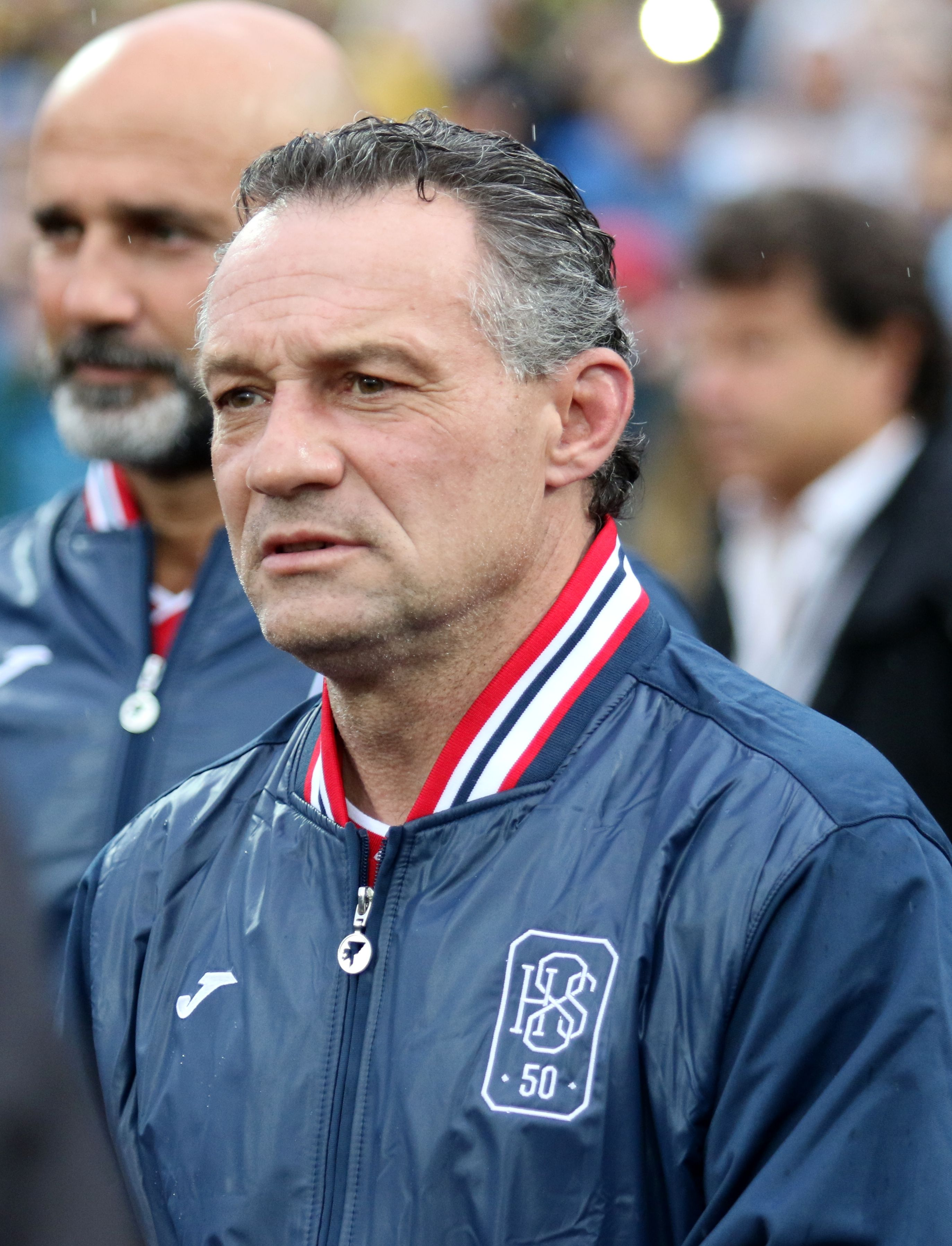
- Nowak in 2016

Personal information
- Date of birth: 5 July 1964 (age 62)
- Place of birth: Pabianice, Poland
- Height: 5 ft 7 in (1.70 m)
- Position: Midfielder

Senior career*
Years	Team	Apps	(Gls)
1979–1983	Włókniarz Pabianice		
1983–1984	GKS Bełchatów		
1984–1985	Zawisza Bydgoszcz	39	(8)
1985–1986	Widzew Łódź	10	(2)
1987–1990	Zawisza Bydgoszcz	83	(18)
1990–1992	Bakırköyspor	54	(16)
1992–1993	Young Boys	42	(4)
1993–1994	Dynamo Dresden	23	(2)
1994	1. FC Kaiserslautern	0	(0)
1994–1998	1860 Munich	93	(15)
1998–2002	Chicago Fire	114	(26)

International career
1990–1998	Poland	24	(3)

Managerial career
- 2004–2006: D.C. United
- 2007–2009: United States U23
- 2007–2009: United States (assistant)
- 2010–2012: Philadelphia Union
- 2014–2015: Antigua and Barbuda
- 2016–2017: Lechia Gdańsk
- 2017–2018: Lechia Gdańsk (sporting director)
- 2021–2022: Jagiellonia Białystok
- * Club domestic league appearances and goals

Piotr "Peter" Nowak (Polish pronunciation: [ˈpjɔtr ˈnɔvak]; born 5 July 1964) is a Polish professional football manager and former player. He was most recently in charge of Ekstraklasa club Jagiellonia Białystok.

Nowak played in Europe for Polish clubs such as Zawisza Bydgoszcz and Widzew Łódź, before going on to play in Turkey, Switzerland and Germany. He was voted one of the best players in the Bundesliga for the 1995–96 season while playing with 1860 Munich. He moved to the United States in 1998 and played four years with Chicago Fire. Nowak played for the Poland national football team throughout the 1990s, earning 24 caps, serving as national captain for several years, and being voted Polish Footballer of the Year in 1996.

As a coach, he is a former assistant coach of the United States men's national soccer team under Bob Bradley, former head coach of United States U-23 men's national soccer team, and former head coach of D.C. United and Philadelphia Union of MLS. However, his reputation in the USA took a big hit after he was accused of seriously mistreating and physically abusing players whilst being coach of the latter; an arbitration and a federal case that followed supported the charges in the accusations.

He had a brief stint whilst still a player in the United States as chairman of Górnik Konin, but was hugely unpopular and widely blamed for the club's demise. Over a decade later, he became technical and personal advisor to the president of Caribbean Football Union and technical director and head coach to the Antigua and Barbuda Football Association.

== Club playing career ==
Nowak was born in Pabianice, a small town in Poland. He signed his first professional contract at the age of 15. He played in Polish First Division for Zawisza Bydgoszcz and Widzew Lodz.

After playing at Bakirkoyspor (Turkey) and Young Boys Bern (Switzerland), Nowak moved to Germany to join Bundesliga side Dynamo Dresden. In 1994, he signed with fellow Bundesliga teams, first with 1. FC Kaiserslautern and later TSV 1860 Munich, where he played until 1998. During the 1995–96 season, Nowak was voted the Bundesliga ’s Best Playmaker, as well as the Polish Player of the Year. In the following season he advanced with 1860 Munich to UEFA Cup.

In 1998, Nowak moved to the United States and joined the Chicago Fire for the team ’s inaugural MLS season. He led the Fire to a MLS Cup (1998) and two US Open Cups (1998, 2000). He was elected three times to MLS All Star Team, three times as Chicago Fire MVP and three times as MLS Best XI including 1998 MLS Cup MVP. Nowak patrolled the Fire midfield for 114 league games, registering 26 goals and 48 assists. He played with Chicago for five seasons and retired in 2003. He was inducted as a first member of “Ring of Fire” Chicago Fire's Hall of Fame in 2004.

== International playing career ==
Nowak made his debut in the Poland national team in 1990, but it was not until the middle of the decade that he began to regularly appear in the team, briefly becoming captain later on. His last match for the national team was against England played on 31 May 1997 as part of the 1998 World Cup qualifiers. Overall he played in 19 matches and scored three goals.

== Chairman career ==
Whilst still playing for clubs in the United States, he became chairman of Polish club Górnik Konin in 1999. Manager Jerzy Kasalik was sacked by Nowak for unexplained reasons, despite their first place in the league, and he appointed little-known manager Jarosław Kotas. The team soon started to lose matches at an alarming rate and only just managed to escape relegation, only thanks to their good start.

The 1999–2000 season proved to be a disaster. The owners decided to rename the senior team KP Konin, whilst the reserve and junior teams used the old Aluminium Konin name. The club finished dead last. It then turned out that in the second half of the season plans to relocate the team to Bydgoszcz were put in place, and played under the name Zawisza SSA. In the end the relocation never came to fruition, but the team, which only amassed 8 points the entire season, was disbanded, with the club management and the chairman Piotr Nowak widely held responsible. The reserve team, which that same season was relegated from the Third Division, became the first team, and a season later (2000–01 season) managed to gain promotion, going straight back up.

Under the lead of Jerzy Kasalik, the team achieved a back-to-back promotion to the Second Division, restoring the club's place after the first team was disbanded. The success however was short-lived, after in the 2003–04 season the club finished last once again. Following their relegation, many of the Aluminium players were involved in the large corruption scandal in Polish football which shook the country that season, which had a major impact on the club sponsors who all withdrew. This meant that the new club couldn't even afford to play in the then regional Third Division, and the senior team was disbanded.

== Coaching career ==
=== D.C. United ===
Nowak worked in the Fire front office for one season as a director of international relations and ambassador, before moving to coaching in 2004, when he was hired as head coach of D.C. United. In his first season there, he guided D.C. United to a MLS Cup Championship. In three years with United, Nowak led the club to win the Supporters ’ Shield and was elected twice as a Head Coach of MLS All Star team (2004, 2006)

=== US national teams ===
He moved on to become an Assistant to US Men’s National Team Head Coach Bob Bradley. Nowak also served as Head Coach of the U-23 National Team, advancing to 2008 Olympic Games in Beijing. Together with Bradley, they coached over 70 players and orchestrated the USA’s championship run to a title in the 2007 CONCACAF Gold Cup and Mandela Cup. On 28 May 2009, Nowak resigned from his position with the US Men's National Team.

=== Philadelphia Union ===
In December 2011 Nowak was named Executive Vice President / Team Manager for the Philadelphia Union. In his 2nd season as head Coach, the Union made the playoffs for the first time. As a result, Nowak was elected to be the MLS All Star Head Coach for 2012.

==== Union firing for player abuse ====
Nowak was fired by the Union on 13 June 2012. Major League Soccer had conducted an investigation into Novak's mistreatment of Union players, and advised Union CEO Nick Sakiewicz to terminate Nowak’s contract. Sakiewicz when he fired Novak referred to “philosophical differences” between the Union ownership and Nowak.

Accusations of Nowak mistreating his players surfaced publicly thereafter. Among the accusations were Nowak's: repeatedly insulting players, trivializing injuries and calling players who had concussions "pussies" and "weak", brutal hazing of rookies, and trying to out those who took their grievances to the Players’ Union. Nowak admitted to making players run 10–12 miles in the heat while refusing them water over trainers' objections, spanking players with a sandal, and dipping his hands in ice water and paddling players. The club, in light of the evidence supporting the accusations, had in terminating Nowak said that Nowak had broken his contract, team rules, and the MLS collective bargaining agreement and was therefore fired "for cause." Nowak filed a wrongful termination lawsuit against the Philadelphia Union, which he lost, as it was rejected both by an arbitrator in 2015, and then again by a Philadelphia federal district court the following year. In addition to Nowak losing his lawsuit, he was ordered to pay $454,000 to the team for its legal fees.

=== Lechia Gdańsk ===
In 2016, he became the manager of Lechia Gdańsk in Poland.

== Administrative and advisory career ==
In February 2014, he was hired as a technical and personal advisor to the president of the Caribbean Football Union, which contains 31 countries as a part of CONCACAF. In September 2014, his duties were grown to include technical director and head coach of Antigua and Barbuda Football Association, overseeing all National Team Programs including FIFA Grass Roots and Female Programs.

== Career statistics ==
Scores and results list Poland's goal tally first, score column indicates score after each Nowak goal.

List of international goals scored by Piotr Nowak
No.	Date	Venue	Opponent	Score	Result	Competition
1	6 May 1990	Comiskey Park, Chicago, United States	Costa Rica		2–0	Friendly
2	25 April 1995	Górnik Zabrze Stadium, Zabrze, Poland	Israel		4–3	UEFA Euro 1996 qualifying
3	7 June 1995	Górnik Zabrze Stadium, Zabrze, Poland	Slovakia		5–0	UEFA Euro 1996 qualifying

== Managerial statistics ==
As of 27 May 2012

Managerial record by team and tenure
Team	From	To	Record				
Team	From	To	G	W	L	D	Win %
D.C. United	2004	2006	94	42	27	25	44.68
United States U-23	2007	2009					
Philadelphia Union	2010	2012	75	21	30	24	28
Total			169	63	57	49	37.28

== Legacy ==
In 2003, Nowak was named the first member of the Ring of Fire, the highest honor the Chicago Fire bestows, and his name and number 10 are displayed at midfield at their stadium, Toyota Park. In 2005, Nowak was named to the MLS All-Time Best XI. For his contribution to promotion of Poland abroad and achievements as a coach, he received the Knight's Cross of the Order of Merit of the Republic of Poland in 2005.

== Honours ==
Chicago Fire

- MLS Cup: 1998
- U.S. Open Cup: 1998, 2000

Individual

- Piłka Nożna Polish Footballer of the Year: 1996
- MLS Best XI: 1998, 2000, 2001
- MLS All-Time Best XI
- MLS Cup MVP: 1998
- MLS All-Star: 1999, 2000

== See also ==
- List of MLS coaches
