= Timeline of Major League Soccer =

The following is a timeline of organizational changes in Major League Soccer (MLS), a professional soccer league in the United States and Canada that began play in 1996 with 10 teams and currently has 30 teams. This article includes expansions, contractions, renamings of clubs and conference realignment.

== 1996–1999: Early years ==
=== 1996 (10 teams) ===
The league operated its first inaugural season in 1996 with 10 teams and two conferences.

1996 MLS teams
Eastern	Western
Columbus Crew	Colorado Rapids
D.C. United	Dallas Burn
New England Revolution	Kansas City Wiz
NY/NJ MetroStars	Los Angeles Galaxy
Tampa Bay Mutiny	San Jose Clash

=== 1997 (10 teams) ===
The Kansas City Wiz rebranded to Kansas City Wizards in the following season.

1997 MLS teams
Eastern	Western
Columbus Crew	Colorado Rapids
D.C. United	Dallas Burn
New England Revolution	Kansas City Wizards
NY/NJ MetroStars	Los Angeles Galaxy
Tampa Bay Mutiny	San Jose Clash

=== 1998–1999: First expansion (12 teams) ===
The league expanded for the first time in 1998 with Miami Fusion and Chicago Fire. The New York/New Jersey MetroStars went by just MetroStars by the same season.

Team's first season in MLS *

1998–1999 MLS teams
Eastern	Western
Columbus Crew	Chicago Fire *
D.C. United	Colorado Rapids
MetroStars	Dallas Burn
Miami Fusion *	Kansas City Wizards
New England Revolution	Los Angeles Galaxy
Tampa Bay Mutiny	San Jose Clash

== 2000–2001: Three divisions ==
=== 2000–2001 (12 teams) ===
In 2000, the league realigned to three divisions, with a new division: the Central Division. The Eastern and Western Conferences were renamed to the Eastern and Western Divisions respectively. The San Jose Clash rebranded to San Jose Earthquakes.

Team would fold after the 2001 season †

Eastern	Central	Western
D.C. United	Chicago Fire	Colorado Rapids
MetroStars	Columbus Crew	Kansas City Wizards
Miami Fusion †	Dallas Burn	Los Angeles Galaxy
New England Revolution	Tampa Bay Mutiny †	San Jose Earthquakes

== 2002–2006: League contraction ==
=== 2002–2004 (10 teams) ===
Prior to the 2002 MLS season, Miami Fusion of the Eastern Division and Tampa Bay Mutiny of the Central Division folded. The league returned to the two-conference format for the season with a similar alignment to the 1997 season, only with Chicago Fire moving to the Eastern Conference.

Team moved from the Central Division ‡

2002–2004 MLS teams
Eastern	Western
Chicago Fire ‡	Colorado Rapids
Columbus Crew ‡	Dallas Burn ‡
D.C. United	Kansas City Wizards
MetroStars	Los Angeles Galaxy
New England Revolution	San Jose Earthquakes

=== 2005 (12 teams) ===
Chivas USA and Real Salt Lake were both added to the Western Conference for the 2005 expansion. The Kansas City Wizards were subsequently moved to the Eastern Conference to even the conferences out. The Dallas Burn rebranded to FC Dallas.

Team's first season in MLS *
Team switched conferences ‡
Team relocated after the season †

2005 MLS teams
Eastern	Western
Chicago Fire	Chivas USA *
Columbus Crew	Colorado Rapids
D.C. United	FC Dallas
Kansas City Wizards ‡	Los Angeles Galaxy
MetroStars	Real Salt Lake *
New England Revolution	San Jose Earthquakes †

=== 2006 (12 teams) ===
The San Jose Earthquakes relocated to Houston to become the Houston Dynamo. The MetroStars rebranded as the New York Red Bulls.

2006 MLS teams
Eastern	Western
Chicago Fire	Chivas USA
Columbus Crew	Colorado Rapids
D.C. United	FC Dallas
Kansas City Wizards	Houston Dynamo
New England Revolution	Los Angeles Galaxy
New York Red Bulls	Real Salt Lake

== 2007–2014: Expansion into Canada ==
=== 2007 (13 teams) ===
Toronto FC was added to the Eastern Conference during 2007 expansion, adding a team in Canada for the first time.

Team's first season in MLS *

2007 MLS teams
Eastern	Western
Chicago Fire	Chivas USA
Columbus Crew	Colorado Rapids
D.C. United	FC Dallas
Kansas City Wizards	Houston Dynamo
New England Revolution	Los Angeles Galaxy
New York Red Bulls	Real Salt Lake
Toronto FC *	

=== 2008 (14 teams) ===
The San Jose Earthquakes returned to the Western Conference for the 2008 season after a 2-year hiatus.

Team returned to MLS ^

2008 MLS teams
Eastern	Western
Chicago Fire	Chivas USA
Columbus Crew	Colorado Rapids
D.C. United	FC Dallas
Kansas City Wizards	Houston Dynamo
New England Revolution	Los Angeles Galaxy
New York Red Bulls	Real Salt Lake
Toronto FC	San Jose Earthquakes ^

=== 2009 (15 teams) ===
Seattle Sounders FC was added to the Western Conference for the 2009 season, succeeding USL First Division team of the same name.

Team's first season in MLS *

2009 MLS teams
Eastern	Western
Chicago Fire	Chivas USA
Columbus Crew	Colorado Rapids
D.C. United	FC Dallas
Kansas City Wizards	Houston Dynamo
New England Revolution	LA Galaxy
New York Red Bulls	Real Salt Lake
Toronto FC	San Jose Earthquakes
	Seattle Sounders FC *

=== 2010 (16 teams) ===
Philadelphia Union was added to the Eastern Conference for the 2010 season.

Team's first season in MLS *

2010 MLS teams
Eastern	Western
Chicago Fire	Chivas USA
Columbus Crew	Colorado Rapids
D.C. United	FC Dallas
Kansas City Wizards	Houston Dynamo
New England Revolution	LA Galaxy
New York Red Bulls	Real Salt Lake
Philadelphia Union *	San Jose Earthquakes
Toronto FC	Seattle Sounders FC

=== 2011 (18 teams) ===
The Portland Timbers and Vancouver Whitecaps FC were both added to the Western Conference with both teams being successors of USL teams. Houston Dynamo subsequently switched to the Eastern Conference to make both conferences even. The Kansas City Wizards rebranded to Sporting Kansas City prior to the season.

Team's first season in MLS *
Team switched conferences ‡

2011 MLS teams
Eastern	Western
Chicago Fire	Chivas USA
Columbus Crew	Colorado Rapids
D.C. United	FC Dallas
Houston Dynamo ‡	LA Galaxy
New England Revolution	Portland Timbers *
New York Red Bulls	Real Salt Lake
Philadelphia Union	San Jose Earthquakes
Sporting Kansas City	Seattle Sounders FC
Toronto FC	Vancouver Whitecaps FC *

=== 2012–2014 (19 teams) ===
Montreal Impact was added to the Eastern Conference for the 2012 season, succeeding a USL First Division team of the same name.

Team's first season in MLS *
Team folded after the 2014 season †

2012–2014 MLS teams
Eastern	Western
Chicago Fire	Chivas USA †
Columbus Crew	Colorado Rapids
D.C. United	FC Dallas
Houston Dynamo	LA Galaxy
Montreal Impact *	Portland Timbers
New England Revolution	Real Salt Lake
New York Red Bulls	San Jose Earthquakes
Philadelphia Union	Seattle Sounders FC
Sporting Kansas City	Vancouver Whitecaps FC
Toronto FC	

== 2015–2025: Rapid expansion ==
=== 2015–2016 (20 teams) ===
New York City FC and Orlando City SC were both added to the Eastern Conference, the latter of which was a successor of a USL Pro team of the same name; subsequently the Houston Dynamo and Sporting Kansas City were relocated back to the Western Conference to make both conferences even. Chivas USA would fold prior to the 2015 season.

Team's first season in MLS *
Team switched conferences ‡

2015–2016 MLS teams
Eastern	Western
Chicago Fire	Colorado Rapids
Columbus Crew	FC Dallas
D.C. United	Houston Dynamo ‡
Montreal Impact	LA Galaxy
New England Revolution	Portland Timbers
New York City FC *	Real Salt Lake
New York Red Bulls	San Jose Earthquakes
Orlando City SC *	Seattle Sounders FC
Philadelphia Union	Sporting Kansas City ‡
Toronto FC	Vancouver Whitecaps FC

=== 2017 (22 teams) ===
Atlanta United FC and Minnesota United FC were added to the Eastern and Western Conferences, respectively; the latter of which was the successor to the NASL team of the same name.

Team's first season in MLS *

2017 MLS teams
Eastern	Western
Atlanta United FC *	Colorado Rapids
Chicago Fire	FC Dallas
Columbus Crew	Houston Dynamo
D.C. United	LA Galaxy
Montreal Impact	Minnesota United FC *
New England Revolution	Portland Timbers
New York City FC	Real Salt Lake
New York Red Bulls	San Jose Earthquakes
Orlando City SC	Seattle Sounders FC
Philadelphia Union	Sporting Kansas City
Toronto FC	Vancouver Whitecaps FC

=== 2018 (23 teams) ===
Los Angeles FC was added to the Western Conference for the 2018 season.

Team's first season in MLS *

2018 MLS teams
Eastern	Western
Atlanta United FC	Colorado Rapids
Chicago Fire	FC Dallas
Columbus Crew	Houston Dynamo
D.C. United	LA Galaxy
Montreal Impact	Los Angeles FC *
New England Revolution	Minnesota United FC
New York City FC	Portland Timbers
New York Red Bulls	Real Salt Lake
Orlando City SC	San Jose Earthquakes
Philadelphia Union	Seattle Sounders FC
Toronto FC	Sporting Kansas City
	Vancouver Whitecaps FC

=== 2019 (24 teams) ===
FC Cincinnati was added to the Eastern Conference after spending 3 years in the USL.

Team's first season in MLS *

2019 MLS teams
Eastern		Western	
Atlanta United FC	New England Revolution	Colorado Rapids	Portland Timbers
Chicago Fire	New York City FC	FC Dallas	Real Salt Lake
FC Cincinnati *	New York Red Bulls	Houston Dynamo	San Jose Earthquakes
Columbus Crew	Orlando City SC	LA Galaxy	Seattle Sounders FC
D.C. United	Philadelphia Union	Los Angeles FC	Sporting Kansas City
Montreal Impact	Toronto FC	Minnesota United FC	Vancouver Whitecaps FC

=== 2020 (26 teams) ===
Inter Miami CF and Nashville SC were both added to the Eastern and Western Conferences, respectively, for the 2020 season. However, after the MLS is Back Tournament, Nashville SC was moved to the Eastern Conference. The Chicago Fire SC rebranded to Chicago Fire FC.

Team's first season in MLS *
Team's first season in MLS, then switched conferences midseason *‡

2020 MLS teams
Eastern		Western	
Atlanta United FC	Nashville SC *‡	Colorado Rapids	Portland Timbers
Chicago Fire FC	New England Revolution	FC Dallas	Real Salt Lake
FC Cincinnati	New York City FC	Houston Dynamo	San Jose Earthquakes
Columbus Crew	New York Red Bulls	LA Galaxy	Seattle Sounders FC
D.C. United	Orlando City SC	Los Angeles FC	Sporting Kansas City
Inter Miami CF *	Philadelphia Union	Minnesota United FC	Vancouver Whitecaps FC
Montreal Impact	Toronto FC		

=== 2021 (27 teams) ===
Austin FC was added to the Western Conference for the 2021 season. The Montreal Impact rebranded to Club de Foot Montréal (CF Montréal).

Team's first season in MLS *

2021 MLS teams
Eastern		Western	
Atlanta United FC	Nashville SC	Austin FC *	Portland Timbers
Chicago Fire FC	New England Revolution	Colorado Rapids	Real Salt Lake
FC Cincinnati	New York City FC	FC Dallas	San Jose Earthquakes
Columbus Crew	New York Red Bulls	Houston Dynamo FC	Seattle Sounders FC
D.C. United	Orlando City SC	LA Galaxy	Sporting Kansas City
Inter Miami CF	Philadelphia Union	Los Angeles FC	Vancouver Whitecaps FC
CF Montréal	Toronto FC	Minnesota United FC	

=== 2022 (28 teams) ===
Charlotte FC was added to the Eastern Conference for the 2022 season; Nashville SC subsequently relocated to the Western Conference to even the conferences.

Team's first season in MLS *
Team switched conferences ‡

2022 MLS teams
Eastern		Western	
Atlanta United FC	CF Montréal	Austin FC	Nashville SC ‡
Charlotte FC *	New England Revolution	Colorado Rapids	Portland Timbers
Chicago Fire FC	New York City FC	FC Dallas	Real Salt Lake
FC Cincinnati	New York Red Bulls	Houston Dynamo FC	San Jose Earthquakes
Columbus Crew	Orlando City SC	LA Galaxy	Seattle Sounders FC
D.C. United	Philadelphia Union	Los Angeles FC	Sporting Kansas City
Inter Miami CF	Toronto FC	Minnesota United FC	Vancouver Whitecaps FC

=== 2023–2024 (29 teams) ===
St. Louis City SC was added to the Western Conference for the 2023 season; Nashville SC relocated to the Eastern Conference for a second time.

Team's first season in MLS *
Team switched conferences ‡

2023–2024 MLS teams
Eastern		Western	
Atlanta United FC	Nashville SC ‡	Austin FC	Portland Timbers
Charlotte FC	New England Revolution	Colorado Rapids	Real Salt Lake
Chicago Fire FC	New York City FC	FC Dallas	San Jose Earthquakes
FC Cincinnati	New York Red Bulls	Houston Dynamo FC	Seattle Sounders FC
Columbus Crew	Orlando City SC	LA Galaxy	Sporting Kansas City
D.C. United	Philadelphia Union	Los Angeles FC	St. Louis City SC *
Inter Miami CF	Toronto FC	Minnesota United FC	Vancouver Whitecaps FC
CF Montréal

=== 2025 (30 teams) ===
San Diego FC was added to the Western Conference for the 2025 season.

Team's first season in MLS *

2025 MLS teams
Eastern			Western		
Atlanta United FC	D.C. United	New York City FC	Austin FC	Los Angeles FC	San Jose Earthquakes
Charlotte FC	Inter Miami CF	New York Red Bulls	Colorado Rapids	Minnesota United FC	Seattle Sounders FC
Chicago Fire FC	CF Montréal	Orlando City SC	FC Dallas	Portland Timbers	Sporting Kansas City
FC Cincinnati	Nashville SC	Philadelphia Union	Houston Dynamo FC	Real Salt Lake	St. Louis City SC
Columbus Crew	New England Revolution	Toronto FC	LA Galaxy	San Diego FC *	Vancouver Whitecaps FC

== See also ==
- History of Major League Soccer
- Expansion of Major League Soccer
- Major League Soccer defunct clubs
