= History of Major League Soccer =

The history of Major League Soccer (MLS) began in 1988, when the United States Soccer Federation pledged to create a Division 1 professional soccer league as a condition to FIFA awarding the 1994 FIFA World Cup to the United States. MLS was officially formed in 1995. The league began play in 1996 with 10 teams, and in 1998 grew to 12 teams. MLS experienced some difficulties in its first seasons, with the league losing money in the early years, resulting in two teams folding after the 2001 season. MLS has rebounded since then, with increased attendance and the development of soccer-specific stadiums. With an average attendance of over 20,000 per game, MLS has the third highest average attendance of any sports league in the U.S. after the National Football League (NFL) and Major League Baseball (MLB), and is the seventh highest attended professional soccer league worldwide. MLS currently has 30 teams; the 30th team, San Diego FC, began play in 2025. As of 2023, MLS is the largest first division professional soccer league in the world by number of clubs.

== Background ==
Major League Soccer is the most recent of three professional men's Division 1 national association football leagues with clubs in the United States and Canada. In the US, with no clubs in Canada, the earliest of such leagues was the American Football Association, which was formed in 1884 and allied with The Football Association, becoming a member on February 22, 1909, at an FA meeting chaired by Charles Clegg,

The predecessor of MLS was the top-level North American Soccer League (NASL), which existed from 1968 until 1984. The United States did not have a truly national top-flight league with FIFA-sanctioning until the creation of the NASL. The first league to have U.S. and Canadian professional clubs, the NASL struggled until the mid-1970s when the New York Cosmos, the league's most prominent team, signed a number of the world's best players including Pelé and Franz Beckenbauer. Pelé's arrival attracted other well-known international stars to the league including Johan Cruyff, Gerd Müller, Eusébio, Bobby Moore, and George Best. The 1974 NASL Final between the Los Angeles Aztecs and the Miami Toros was televised live on CBS Sports, the first national broadcast of a pro soccer match in the United States since 1968. Despite dramatic increases in attendance (with some matches drawing over 70,000 fans such as Soccer Bowl '78, the highest attendance to date for any club soccer championship in the United States) over-expansion, the economic recession of the early 1980s, and disputes with the players union ultimately led to the collapse of the NASL following the 1984 season, leaving the United States without a top-level soccer league until MLS.

The other professional men's league starting after the NASL folded was the Canada-only Division 1 Canadian Soccer League (CSL), active from 1987 to 1992. During the positioning for Division 1 status, the CSL folded and teams from the three largest Canadian metropolitan areas, Toronto, Montreal, and Vancouver joined the APSL.

== Establishment ==
In 1988, in exchange for FIFA awarding the right to host the 1994 World Cup, U.S. Soccer promised to establish a Division 1 professional soccer league. In 1993, the USSF selected Major League Professional Soccer (the precursor to MLS) as the exclusive Division 1 professional soccer league. Major League Soccer was officially formed in February 1995 as a limited liability company. MLS had originally planned to begin play in 1995 with 12 teams. However, MLS announced in November 1994 that it would delay its launch until 1996 and began with ten teams: Columbus Crew, D.C. United, New England Revolution, NY/NJ MetroStars, Tampa Bay Mutiny, Colorado Rapids, Dallas Burn, Kansas City Wiz, Los Angeles Galaxy, and San Jose Clash. The league had generated some buzz by managing to lure some marquee players from the 1994 World Cup to play in MLS—including U.S. stars such as Alexi Lalas, Tony Meola and Eric Wynalda, and foreign players such as Mexico's Jorge Campos and Colombia's Carlos Valderrama. Before its maiden season and inaugural draft, MLS allocated four marquee players across the initial ten teams.

Major League Soccer with ESPN and ABC Sports announced the league's first television rights deal on March 15, 1994, without any players, coaches, or teams in place. The three-year agreement covered English-language broadcasting for the 1996–1998 seasons, and committed 10 games on ESPN, 25 on ESPN2, and the MLS Cup on ABC. The deal gave MLS no rights fees but split advertising revenue between the league and networks. Univision, Galavision, and UniMás broadcast matches in Spanish. The original Univision deal lapsed after a few years, leaving only the ABC/ESPN networks as the league's national broadcasters.

The early years of the league gave rise to the Bruce Arena-led dynasty of D.C. United, winning the MLS Cup in three of the league's first four seasons. The league added its first two expansion teams in 1998—the Miami Fusion and the Chicago Fire, with the Chicago Fire winning its first title in 1998 to interrupt United's dominance of the championship.

In 1996, the players filed an antitrust lawsuit, Fraser v. Major League Soccer, alleging that MLS's policy of centrally contracting players and limiting player salaries through a salary cap was an illegal conspiracy among team owners. The court ruled that MLS was a single entity and therefore incapable of conspiring with itself, and that the salary cap and other restrictions were a legal method for the League to maintain solvency and competitive parity, and avoid the problems that had plagued the defunct NASL.

== Early difficulties ==
After its first season, MLS suffered from a decline in attendance. The league's low attendance was all the more apparent in light of the fact that eight of the original ten teams began playing in stadiums owned or rented by American football teams, most of the venues with capacities of 60,000 or more.

MLS experimented with rules deviations in its early years in an attempt to "Americanize" what some viewed as a foreign sport. Some of these rules changes were borrowed from the original NASL, college soccer and high school soccer. MLS implemented the use of shootouts to resolve tie games. These best-of-five contests placed a player 35 yards from goal with five seconds to put the ball past the opposing goalkeeper; if needed the shootout progressed into extra frames. A winning team received one standings point (as opposed to three for the regulation win). MLS also used a countdown clock, rather than a standard progressive clock, with time paused for dead ball situations at a referee's discretion. Halves ended when the clock reached 0:00, rather than at the whistle of the referee as was customary elsewhere.

MLS eventually conceded that the rule changes, particularly the shootout, had alienated some traditional soccer fans while failing to draw new American sports fans as hoped. The shootout and countdown clock were eliminated after the 1999 season. MLS continued to experiment with the settling of tie games in regular season play. In 2000, a 10-minute golden goal period replaced the shootout for tied games, but was abandoned after 2003 after the sudden-death rules were abolished from the Laws of the Game.

The league's quality was cast into doubt when the U.S. men's national team, which was made up largely of MLS players, was eliminated in the first round of the 1998 World Cup by losing to all opponents in the group stage and finishing in last place.

The league began to market itself on the talents of American players, both experienced veterans and fresh talents. Breakout stars like DaMarcus Beasley and Landon Donovan began making names for themselves in MLS before starring for the U.S. national team, while established players such as Brian McBride, Eddie Pope, and Clint Mathis continued to prove their value to both their MLS clubs and the U.S. national team.

The league's ongoing financial problems led to the departure of then-Commissioner Doug Logan in August 1999, with Don Garber, a former National Football League executive, hired as commissioner that same month. Under Garber's auspices, Columbus Crew Stadium was built in 1999, becoming MLS's first soccer-specific stadium. This began a trend among the majority of MLS teams and owners to construct their own venues, abandoning their former stadiums whose main tenants were either professional or college gridiron football teams.

On the field, the early wave of international players who had joined MLS at its inception drifted into retirement or moved on to clubs elsewhere in the world. The run-up to the 2002 World Cup saw a gradual shift in the league's philosophy toward the development of American talent, a move that eventually led to success for U.S. soccer.

Major League Soccer lost an estimated $250 million during its first five years, and lost more than $350 million between its founding and the year 2004. The league's poor financial condition and declining attendances forced MLS to cut expenses to reduce operating losses. Prior to the 2001 season, MLS owners agreed to freeze team budgets and refrain from signing new expensive players. Also during the winter break between the 2000 and 2001 seasons, reports began circulating that MLS was considering trimming the league from 12 teams back to 10 teams. MLS ultimately announced in January 2002 that it had decided to contract the two Florida franchises, the Tampa Bay Mutiny and Miami Fusion. This left the league with 10 teams, the same number as when MLS began. Also, the league reorganized back to the Eastern and Western Conference format after two seasons with the third Central Division.

By 2002, MLS appeared to be in poor condition. Contraction had reduced the number of teams from 12 to 10; MLS was losing money each year; a number of owners pulled out, leaving only three owners in league, with one owner Phil Anschutz owning six teams; and only one team had its own soccer-specific stadium.

== Resurgence ==
The 2002 World Cup, in which the United States unexpectedly made the quarterfinals through wins against Portugal and Mexico, coincided with a resurgence in American soccer and MLS. MLS Cup 2002, held four months after the 2002 World Cup final, set an attendance record with 61,316 spectators at Gillette Stadium witnessing the Los Angeles Galaxy win their first title. This event held the largest crowd attendance in MLS Finals and second-highest attendance in overall domestic American soccer, after the North American Soccer League championship in 1978, which held nearly 75,000 at Giants Stadium.

MLS adopted the IFAB rules and standards in 2003, which included changes such as limiting teams to three substitutions per game. MLS had previously allowed a fourth, goalkeeper-only substitute, but changed the rule after MetroStars coach Bob Bradley used a loophole to insert an outfield player as a fourth substitute.

MLS drew international attention in 2004 with the debut of 14-year-old Freddy Adu for D.C. United, who entered the league with much fanfare and was heralded as one of the top prospects in American soccer history.

MLS underwent a significant transition in the years leading up to the 2006 World Cup. After marketing itself on the talents of American players, the league saw some of its homegrown stars depart for more prominent leagues in Europe. Tim Howard, goalkeeper for the MetroStars, was sold to Manchester United in one of the most lucrative contract deals in league history. DaMarcus Beasley of the Chicago Fire left for PSV Eindhoven, while Landon Donovan, on loan from Bayer Leverkusen, was recalled to Germany. Donovan's stint in Germany was brief; before the start of the 2005 MLS season he was sold back to MLS to play for the Los Angeles Galaxy.

Many more American players, though they factored little in the U.S. national team picture, did make an impact in MLS. In 2005, Jason Kreis of expansion club Real Salt Lake became the first player to score at least 100 career MLS goals. In 2005, the MLS Reserve Division was created, with each reserve squad playing 12 games, providing valuable playing time to develop non-starters on team rosters.

Part of the League's financial stabilization plan involved moving teams out of large American football stadiums and into soccer-specific stadiums. From 2003 to 2008, the League saw the construction of six additional soccer-specific stadiums, largely funded by owners such as Lamar Hunt and Phil Anschutz, so that by the end of 2008, a majority of MLS teams were now in soccer-specific stadiums.

It was also in this era that MLS expanded for the first time since the contraction of 2001. Real Salt Lake and Chivas USA began play in 2005, with Chivas USA becoming the second club in Los Angeles, sharing the Home Depot Center (now known as Dignity Health Sports Park) with the Galaxy. Chivas USA also became the first team in MLS to be directly connected to a foreign club, their sister club of Guadalajara. By 2006 the San Jose Earthquakes owners, players and a few coaches moved to Texas to become the expansion Houston Dynamo, after failing to build a stadium in San Jose. The Dynamo became an expansion team, leaving their history behind for a new San Jose ownership group that would materialize in 2007.

== Designated Players and expansion ==
The 2007 season was a turning point for Major League Soccer in several ways. Toronto FC joined the league as an expansion team with sellout crowds and thousands of people on the waiting list for tickets; Stan Kroenke purchased the Colorado Rapids with a plan to build a soccer-specific stadium; and David Beckham joined MLS as the league's first designated player, drawing sellout crowds.

Since 2007, Major League Soccer has taken steps to raise the league's level of play and to internationalize the league. Among the first moves in this regard was the Designated Player Rule, which helped MLS bring international stars into the league, despite the relatively meager MLS salary cap, and the creation of the SuperLiga, which placed top MLS clubs against top Mexican clubs in an effort to provide more meaningful competition for both leagues. MLS changed the rules regarding foreign players in the league to allow a total of eight per team. This period also saw expansion reach beyond the United States' borders into Canada, beginning with Toronto FC.

The 2007 season witnessed the MLS debut of David Beckham, whose signing had been seen as a coup for American soccer. Beckham's contract with the Los Angeles Galaxy was made possible by the Designated Player Rule. Players such as Cuauhtémoc Blanco of Club América signed for the Chicago Fire, and Juan Pablo Ángel, who moved from Aston Villa to the New York Red Bulls, are some of the first Designated Players who have made major contributions to their clubs.

The departures of Clint Dempsey and Jozy Altidore, coupled with the return of former U.S. national team stars Claudio Reyna and Brian McBride to New York and Chicago, respectively, highlight the exchange of top prospects to Europe for experienced veterans to MLS. Several other well-known foreign players have followed Beckham and Blanco to MLS, including Guillermo Barros Schelotto to Columbus and Freddie Ljungberg to Seattle.

The league announced "Game First" in 2007, a series of initiatives aimed at improving the league in several ways. This included the creation of an official league anthem by Audiobrain—similar to other competitions from around the world. Two anthems were composed: an orchestral versions for regular season matches and a chorus version for the MLS All-Star Game and MLS Cup.

By 2008, San Jose had returned to the league under new ownership. In 2009, the expansion side Seattle Sounders FC opened to a crowd of 32,523 at Qwest Field. The 2010 season ushered in an expansion franchise in the Philadelphia Union and the opening of the New York Red Bulls' soccer-specific stadium, Red Bull Arena. That same summer saw the opening of Philadelphia's own new stadium, PPL Park and the debut of Red Bulls striker Thierry Henry, the leading all-time goalscorer of Arsenal F.C. and the France national team.

The start of the 2011 season saw further expansion with the addition of Vancouver Whitecaps FC, the second Canadian MLS franchise, and the Portland Timbers. The addition of two West Coast teams pushed the Houston Dynamo into the Eastern Conference. The Kansas City Wizards began play under the rebranded moniker of Sporting Kansas City. The 2011 season saw Real Salt Lake reach the finals of the CONCACAF Champions League. During the season, the Galaxy signed another major international star in Republic of Ireland captain and all-time leading goalscorer Robbie Keane. The 2011 season drew an average attendance of 17,872, higher than the average attendances of the NBA and NHL, with nearly one third of MLS regular-season matches selling out.

In 2012, the Montreal Impact became the league's 19th franchise and the third located in Canada. The Impact, after playing their first MLS game at Vancouver, made their home debut at Olympic Stadium in front of a crowd of 58,912.

== 2013–2019 ==
In 2013, MLS introduced New York City FC as the league's 20th team, and Orlando City Soccer Club as the league's 21st team, both to begin playing in 2015. Beginning in summer of 2013 and continuing in the run up to the 2014 World Cup, MLS began signing U.S. stars based in Europe, including Clint Dempsey and Maurice Edu from the English Premier League, and Michael Bradley from Italy's Serie A who joined England International Striker Jermain Defoe in Toronto.

Also in 2013, on May 26 Robbie Rogers played his first match in MLS as a substitute for the LA Galaxy in a 4–0 win over the Seattle Sounders FC, becoming the first openly gay man to play in any top North American professional sports league.

In 2014, MLS announced the league's 22nd team, which had the league return to Miami under the ownership of David Beckham, Simon Fuller and Marcelo Claure.

MLS announced on October 27, 2014, that Chivas USA would cease operations immediately, to be replaced in 2017 with a new expansion franchise in LA. The league had bought Chivas USA, which had struggled to make its mark on or off the pitch, earlier in the year for approximately $70 million.

Despite not entering until 2015, New York City FC and Orlando City announced their first designated players – Spain's All-Time leading goalscorer David Villa (New York) and 2007 Ballon d'Or Winner Kaká (Orlando).

In early 2015, the league announced that two teams—Los Angeles FC and Minnesota United FC—would join MLS in either 2017 or 2018. The 20th season of MLS saw the arrivals of several players who have starred at the highest levels of European club soccer and in international soccer: Giovanni dos Santos, Kaká, Andrea Pirlo, Frank Lampard, Steven Gerrard, Didier Drogba, David Villa, and Sebastian Giovinco. On December 6, 2015, MLS announced its intent to expand to 28 teams. MLS confirmed in August 2016 that Minnesota United would begin play in 2017 along with Atlanta United FC.

In April 2016, the league's commissioner Don Garber reiterated the intention of the league to expand to 28 teams, with the next round of expansion "likely happening in 2020". In December 2016, he updated the expansion plans stating that the league will look to approve the 25th and 26th teams in 2017 and to start play in 2020. In January 2017, the league received bids from 12 ownership groups.

In July 2017, it was reported that Major League Soccer had rejected a $4 billion offer by MP & Silva to acquire all television rights to the league for 10 years following the conclusion of its current contracts with Fox, ESPN, and Univision. While it represents a substantial increase over the current agreements, MP & Silva insisted that the deal would be conditional on Major League Soccer adopting a promotion and relegation system similar to other international leagues. Although the league stated that it rejected the offer due to the exclusive periods that the current rightsholders have to negotiate extensions to their contracts, it was pointed out by the media that Major League Soccer had long-opposed the adoption of promotion and relegation, continuing to utilize the fixed, franchise-based model used in other U.S. sports leagues. Furthermore, MP & Silva founder Riccardo Silva appeared to have a conflict of interest because he also owned Miami FC of the NASL, which stood to benefit from such a promotion and relegation system.

In October 2017, Columbus Crew SC owner Anthony Precourt announced plans to move the franchise to Austin, Texas by 2019. The announcement spawned a league-wide backlash and legal action against the league by the Ohio state government. On August 15, 2018, the Austin City Council voted to approve an agreement with Precourt to move Crew SC to Austin, and on August 22, 2018, the club's new name, Austin FC, was announced. After negotiations between Precourt and Jimmy Haslam, owner of the Cleveland Browns, were announced, MLS made it clear that Austin would receive an expansion team only after a deal to sell Columbus to a local buyer had completed. The purchase of Crew SC by Haslam's group was finalized in late December 2018, and on January 15, 2019, Austin FC was officially announced as a 2021 MLS entry.

MLS announced on December 20, 2017, that it would be awarding an expansion franchise to Nashville, who would play in a yet-to-be-built 27,000-seat soccer-specific stadium, Nashville Fairgrounds Stadium, and are expected to join MLS in 2019 or 2020.

On January 29, 2018, MLS awarded Miami an expansion team, led by David Beckham. Inter Miami CF started play in the 2020 season and will open a proposed 25,000-seat stadium soon after. An expansion team was awarded to Cincinnati, Ohio on May 29, 2018, to the ownership group of USL's FC Cincinnati. The team, which retains the existing FC Cincinnati name, started MLS play in 2019 and moved to a new stadium in 2021 with a minimum capacity of 26,000 seats.

On March 19, 2019, MLS announced a 'multi-year strategic partnership' that made casino operator MGM Resorts International the league's first official gaming partner. Roar Digital, a joint venture of MGM and UK gambling operator GVC Holdings, will become the league's exclusive sports betting partner.

In 2013, New York City FC agreed to pay a record $100 million expansion fee for the right to join MLS in 2015. This record was surpassed by the ownership groups of FC Cincinnati and a new Nashville team, which each paid $150 million to join MLS (FC Cincinnati in 2019 and Nashville in 2020). (Note: A Miami team announced in January 2018 and later unveiled as Inter Miami CF only paid a $25 million fee. David Beckham, the public face of the ownership group, received an option for a future MLS team at that specified fee as part of his original MLS playing contract in 2007.) The same amount was paid as an effective entrance fee by a group that bought Columbus Crew SC in 2018, which led to that team's previous operator receiving a new team in Austin, Texas that will likely join MLS in 2021.

== 2020–present ==
With an average attendance of over 20,000 per game, MLS has the third highest average attendance of any sports league in the U.S. after the National Football League (NFL) and Major League Baseball (MLB), and is the seventh highest attended professional soccer league worldwide.

The league expanded to 30 teams with the addition of Inter Miami CF and Nashville SC in 2020, Austin FC in 2021, Charlotte FC in 2022, St. Louis City SC in 2023, and San Diego FC in 2025. MLS is currently the largest first division professional soccer league in the world.

On November 13, 2025, MLS announced that it will transition to a summer-to-spring schedule closer to European leagues beginning in 2027. The regular season will begin in mid-July, a winter break will take place from mid-December to early or mid-February, and the MLS Cup playoffs will occur in May. MLS stated that moving to this schedule would improve the league's competitiveness, transfer opportunities, and allow the playoffs to have more prominence and be held in warmer weather. Under the new schedule, the MLS Cup playoffs would now compete primarily with the NBA and NHL playoffs, but will still fall within a less-crowded period of North America's professional sports calendar. As part of the transition process, the league will play an abbreviated 2027 season in early 2027, followed by the 2027–28 season in July.

== MLS Cup and Supporters' Shield winners ==
Season	MLS Cup	Supporters' Shield
1996	D.C. United	Tampa Bay Mutiny
1997	D.C. United	D.C. United
1998	Chicago Fire	LA Galaxy
1999	D.C. United	D.C. United
2000	Kansas City Wizards	Kansas City Wizards
2001	San Jose Earthquakes	Miami Fusion
2002	LA Galaxy	LA Galaxy
2003	San Jose Earthquakes	Chicago Fire
2004	D.C. United	Columbus Crew
2005	LA Galaxy	San Jose Earthquakes
2006	Houston Dynamo	D.C. United
2007	Houston Dynamo	D.C. United
2008	Columbus Crew	Columbus Crew
2009	Real Salt Lake	Columbus Crew
2010	Colorado Rapids	LA Galaxy
2011	LA Galaxy	LA Galaxy
2012	LA Galaxy	San Jose Earthquakes
2013	Sporting Kansas City	New York Red Bulls
2014	LA Galaxy	Seattle Sounders FC
2015	Portland Timbers	New York Red Bulls
2016	Seattle Sounders FC	FC Dallas
2017	Toronto FC	Toronto FC
2018	Atlanta United FC	New York Red Bulls
2019	Seattle Sounders FC	Los Angeles FC
2020	Columbus Crew SC	Philadelphia Union
2021	New York City FC	New England Revolution
2022	Los Angeles FC	Los Angeles FC
2023	Columbus Crew	FC Cincinnati
2024	LA Galaxy	Inter Miami CF
2025	Inter Miami CF	Philadelphia Union
2026		Nashville SC

=== Results by team ===
Team	MLS Cups	Last Cup	Cup Finals	Supp. Shields	Last Supp. Shield	Inaugural MLS Season
LA Galaxy	6	2024	10	4	2011	1996
D.C. United	4	2004	5	4	2007	1996
San Jose Earthquakes	2	2003	2	2	2012	1996
Seattle Sounders FC	2	2019	4	1	2014	2009
Sporting Kansas City	2	2013	3	1	2000	1996
Houston Dynamo FC	2	2007	4	0	—	2006
Columbus Crew	3	2023	4	3	2009	1996
Toronto FC	1	2017	3	1	2017	2007
Chicago Fire FC	1	1998	3	1	2003	1998
Portland Timbers	1	2015	3	0	—	2011
Colorado Rapids	1	2010	2	0	—	1996
Real Salt Lake	1	2009	2	0	—	2005
Atlanta United FC	1	2018	1	0	—	2017
New York City FC	1	2021	1	0	—	2015
New York Red Bulls	0	—	2	3	2018	1996
FC Dallas	0	—	1	1	2016	1996
Philadelphia Union	0	—	1	1	2020	2010
Los Angeles FC	1	2022	2	2	2022	2018
New England Revolution	0	—	5	1	2021	1996
Vancouver Whitecaps FC	0	—	0	0	—	2011
CF Montreal	0	—	0	0	—	2012
Orlando City SC	0	—	0	0	—	2015
Minnesota United FC	0	—	0	0	—	2017
FC Cincinnati	0	—	0	1	2023	2019
Inter Miami CF	1	2025	1	1	2024	2020
Nashville SC	0	—	0	1	2026	2020
Austin FC	0	—	0	0	—	2021
Charlotte FC	0	—	0	0	—	2022
St Louis City SC	0	—	0	0	—	2023

== See also ==
- History of soccer in the United States
- Expansion of Major League Soccer
- List of Major League Soccer defunct clubs
