= Expansion of Major League Soccer =

Major League Soccer is the top level of professional soccer in the United States. It began play in 1996 with 10 teams and has expanded several times since 1998. From 2005 to 2025, the league expanded rapidly and has added an average of one new team per season. The league has 30 teams as of the 2025 season with the debut of San Diego FC.

Expanding and establishing a larger national reach is seen as essential to securing television rights fees needed to reach MLS's initially stated goal of becoming one of the top leagues in the world. As of December 2024, there are no pending expansion teams but the league may expand to 32 teams at a later date.

In 2007, Toronto FC became the first of three Canadian teams to join the league. In 2013, New York City FC agreed to pay a record $100 million expansion fee for the right to join MLS in 2015. This record was surpassed by the ownership groups of FC Cincinnati and Nashville SC, which each paid $150 million to join MLS (FC Cincinnati in 2019 and Nashville in 2020). (Note: A Miami team announced in January 2018 and later unveiled as Inter Miami CF only paid a $25 million fee. David Beckham, the public face of the ownership group, received an option for a future MLS team at that specified fee as part of his original MLS playing contract in 2007.) The same amount was paid as an effective entrance fee by a group that bought Columbus Crew SC in 2018, which led to that team's previous operator receiving a new team in Austin, Texas, that joined MLS in April 2021. Before Sacramento's group withdrew its franchise acquisition, MLS also announced that the ownership groups of the 28th and 29th teams would each pay a $200 million entrance fee and that of the 30th had to pay $325 million.

Major League Soccer considers several criteria when determining where to award expansion franchises:

- Owners that are committed to MLS and have the financial wherewithal to invest in a team
- A stadium or approved plans for a stadium (preferably a soccer-specific stadium) that allows the team to control revenue streams such as parking and concessions
- The size of the market of the metropolitan area
- An established local fan base.

Progression of MLS expansion
Seasons	No. of teams
1996–1997	10
1998–2001	12
2002–2004	10
2005–2006	12
2007	13
2008	14
2009	15
2010	16
2011	18
2012–2014	19
2015–2016	20
2017	22
2018	23
2019	24
2020	26
2021	27
2022	28
2023–2024	29
2025–present	30

== Early history: 1993–2004 ==
MLS expansion got off to a mixed start in its initial years. MLS began playing with 10 teams in 1996, grew to 12 teams in 1998, but put expansion plans on hold and then eliminated two teams following the 2001 season to return to 10 teams.

=== Foundation (1993–1996) ===
Major League Soccer was established in 1993, as part of an agreement with FIFA that the United States set up a professional first division to gain the right to host the 1994 FIFA World Cup. No successful professional outdoor soccer league existed since the North American Soccer League folded in 1985. Due to rapid over-expansion and poor franchise placement, the NASL collapse led future MLS leaders to be extremely cautious of establishing new franchises.

Initially 12 teams were to be placed in carefully selected cities where a strong soccer market was thought to exist, which was scaled back to 10 after potential backers could not be found. Eventually 22 communities submitted formal bids to host an inaugural MLS franchise.

The initial 10 teams were the Columbus Crew, D.C. United, New England Revolution, New York/New Jersey MetroStars (now New York Red Bulls), Tampa Bay Mutiny, Colorado Rapids, Dallas Burn (now FC Dallas), Kansas City Wiz (eventually Wizards; now Sporting Kansas City), Los Angeles Galaxy and San Jose Clash (now San Jose Earthquakes). Although New York City and Los Angeles were awarded franchises, the next four largest American cities – Chicago, Houston, Philadelphia, and Detroit – were without a team. Using American football stadiums, the new league kicked off in April 1996.

=== Expansion: Chicago and Miami (1998) ===
In 1998, the league expanded for the first time, rising from 10 teams to 12. The new teams were the Chicago Fire SC (now Chicago Fire FC) and Miami Fusion. Miami owner Ken Horowitz paid a $20 million expansion fee to join MLS, while the expansion fee for the Chicago team was $5 million.

=== Contraction from Florida (2002) ===
Major League Soccer reportedly lost an estimated $250 million during its first five years. During the winter break between the 2000 and 2001 seasons, reports began circulating that MLS was considering trimming the league from 12 teams back to 10 teams. MLS announced in January 2002 that it had decided to contract the two Florida franchises, the Tampa Bay Mutiny and Miami Fusion. The league chose to fold Miami, in part because their ownership reportedly lacked financial resources, had been trying to run the Fusion on a bare-minimum budget, and had asked the league to pay some of the club's expenses. Miami ownership had reportedly experienced $15 million in operating losses since Miami joined the league. The league folded the Tampa Bay Mutiny in part because the team was operated by the league instead of by an individual owner, meaning that the league had to absorb 100% of the team's operating losses. This contraction left the league with 10 teams, the same number as when MLS began.

== First growth phase: 2005–2014 ==
In 2005, MLS began a significant expansion phase, nearly doubling in size from 10 teams in 2004 to 19 teams in 2014.

=== Los Angeles and Salt Lake City (2005) ===
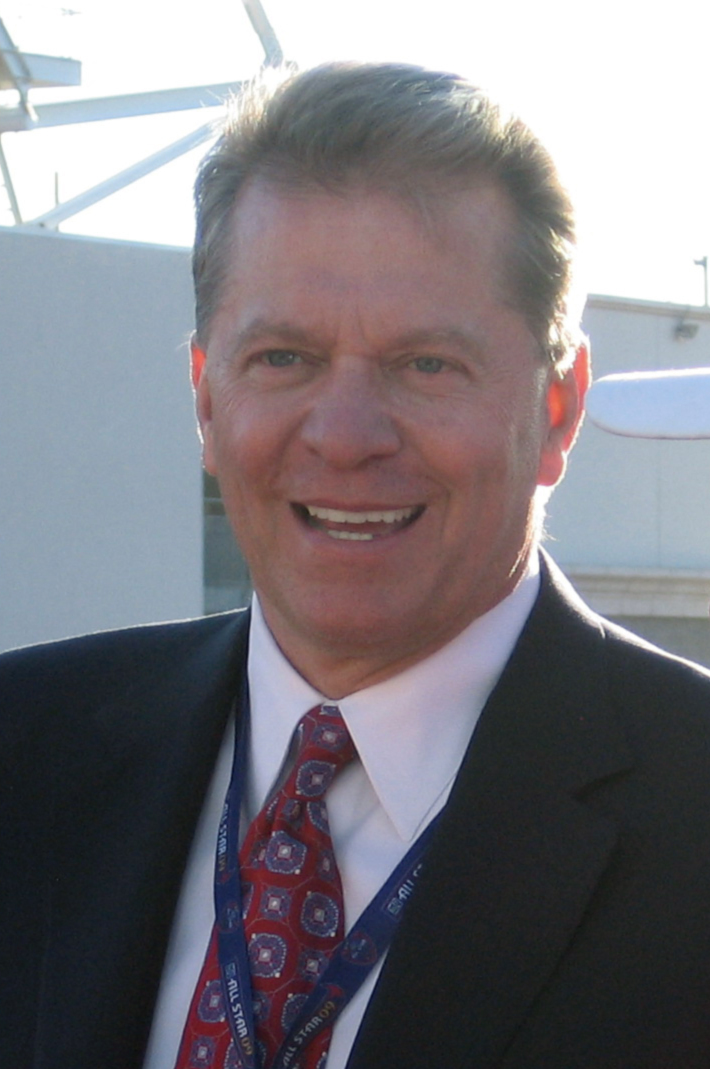
Dave Checketts, owner of Real Salt Lake, who kicked off in 2005

The performance of the US national team at the 2002 World Cup, where they reached the quarter-final, sparked a recovery in the league's fortunes, and attendances once again began to rise. MLS began looking to expand once more with a number of cities interested in hosting new teams. The demand for an expansion team grew.

MLS awarded a second franchise to the Los Angeles area, Chivas USA, in 2004 and began play in 2005. The expansion fee was $7.5 million. The team was owned partly by C.D. Guadalajara owner Jorge Vergara, and took the name and colors from the Mexican club with the aim of appealing to the Hispanic community in Southern California. Chivas and the Los Angeles Galaxy shared The Home Depot Center (now Dignity Health Sports Park) and played in the league's first local derby game.

The league also announced Real Salt Lake in 2004 and began play in 2005. The expansion fee was $7.5 million for the team in Utah. The franchise received permission to use the "Real" name from Real Madrid as part of a business agreement between the Salt Lake owner Dave Checketts and the Spanish club. Real Salt Lake initially played its home games at Rice-Eccles Stadium on the University of Utah campus before moving to Rio Tinto Stadium in the suburb of Sandy in October 2008.

=== Relocation: Houston (2006) ===
In 2005, the San Jose Earthquakes were put on hiatus because of a failure to secure a soccer-specific stadium. The players and the coach were moved to an expansion team in Houston, Texas, where they became the Houston Dynamo playing out of Robertson Stadium. The number of teams in the league did not change.

=== Toronto (2007) ===
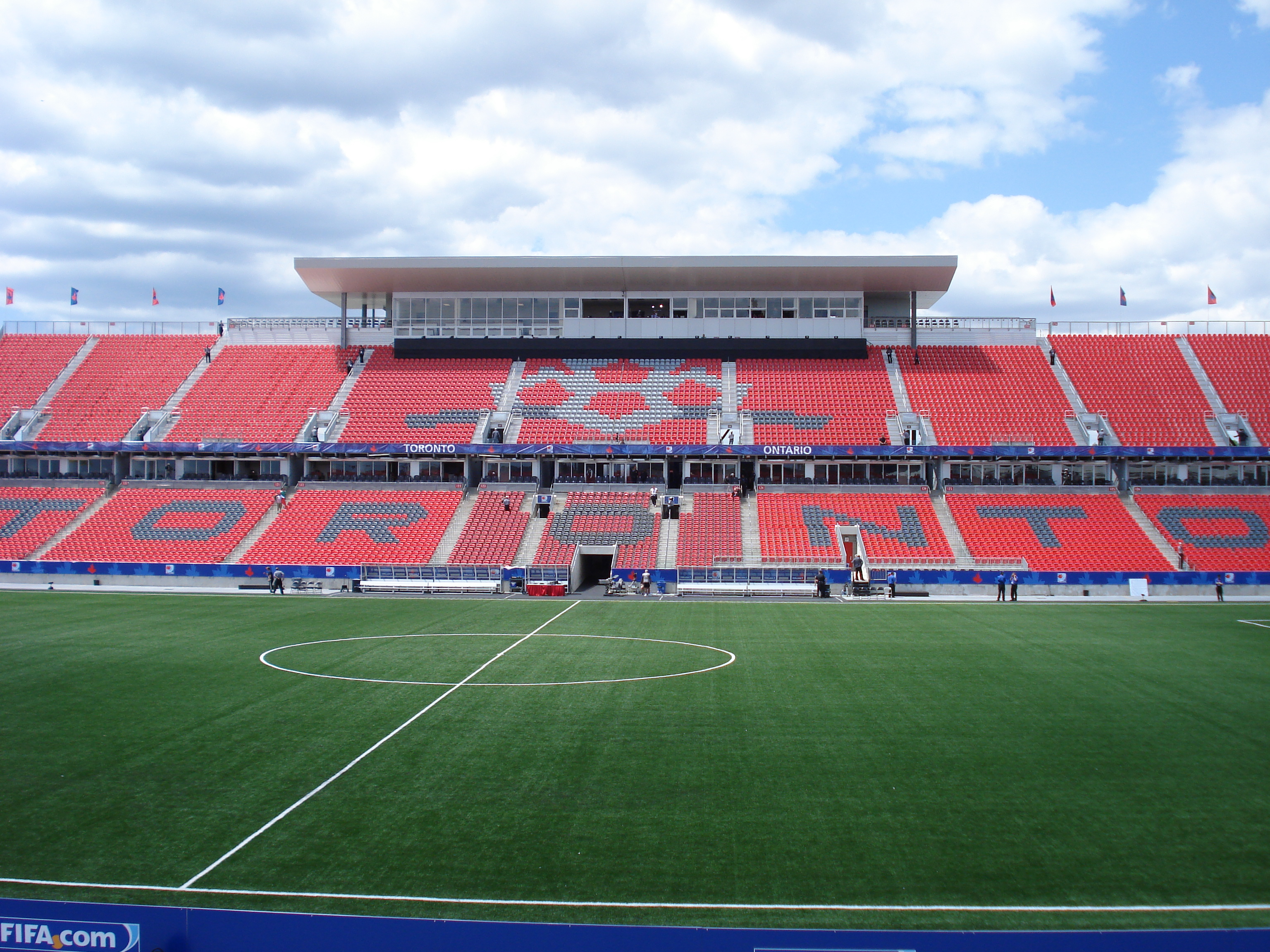
Toronto began play at BMO Field in 2007, the first time an MLS expansion club played its inaugural season in a soccer-specific stadium.

In November 2005, Major League Soccer announced that it had approved an expansion franchise in Toronto to be owned and operated by Maple Leaf Sports & Entertainment, which also owns the Toronto Maple Leafs and Toronto Raptors. The expansion fee was $10 million for the Toronto team. The Toronto City Council had previously approved $9.8 million in funding for a $62.8-million stadium, with the rest of the money coming from MLSE, the federal government, and the provincial government. The team name Toronto FC and logo were announced in May 2006. The club played their first season in MLS in 2007, finishing at the bottom of the standings. The introduction of MLS into Canada took MLS into a separate country for the first time.

=== San Jose (2008) ===
After a two-year hiatus, the San Jose Earthquakes were reactivated in 2007 and resumed play in MLS in 2008 under new ownership. The expansion fee was $20 million for the reinstated San Jose/Bay Area team.

=== Seattle (2009) ===
Seattle was awarded a franchise in 2009 for a reported expansion fee of $30 million. Following a write-in vote by supporters, the team chose the name Seattle Sounders FC, after the Seattle Sounders that played in the North American Soccer League in the 1970s and '80s. The city did not have a soccer-specific stadium or any plans to construct one, and instead, it shared Qwest Field (now known as Lumen Field) with the Seattle Seahawks of the National Football League who, like the Sounders, were owned in part by the late Microsoft co-founder Paul Allen. The stadium was built as a combined football/soccer stadium with an MLS team in mind, including soccer-specific features.

=== Philadelphia (2010) ===
On February 28, 2008, MLS announced that the sixteenth franchise would be awarded to Philadelphia. Philadelphia was appealing to MLS because Philadelphia was the largest metropolitan area in the U.S. without an MLS franchise, and it had a strong ownership group. There had been a strong campaign to bring a team to the city, with intense lobbying by supporters groups such as the Sons of Ben.

Philadelphia won the bid over a competing bid from St. Louis that was led by St. Louis investor Jeff Cooper. St. Louis had a stadium deal in Collinsville, Illinois, but lacked sufficient financing. The expansion fee was $30 million for the Philadelphia team.

On May 11, 2009, it was announced that the team name would be Philadelphia Union. The new team announced their intention to construct an 18,500-seat stadium in Chester, Pennsylvania, which opened as PPL Park and is now known as Subaru Park.

=== Vancouver and Portland (2011) ===
One of three Canadian cities in the running for 2011 MLS expansion, Vancouver's bid was led by local businessman Greg Kerfoot, at that time owner of the Vancouver Whitecaps FC in USSF D2 Pro. NBA star Steve Nash was also involved as a minority stakeholder. The city's bid was boosted by the proposed construction of the Whitecaps Waterfront Stadium, with an initial capacity of 20,000 and the potential for further expansion. Don Garber called the bid presentation by Vancouver "one of the best I've ever seen." On March 18, 2009, MLS commissioner Don Garber announced that Vancouver had been awarded one of the two 2011 expansion spots for a reported $35 million expansion fee. Vancouver continued to field the second-tier Whitecaps until the MLS team made its debut in 2011. The MLS Whitecaps began the 2011 season at Empire Field, sharing it with the BC Lions of the Canadian Football League, before both teams moved into the renovated BC Place in October 2011.

On July 31, 2008, Merritt Paulson announced that he would apply for an MLS franchise for Portland as an MLS continuation of the Portland Timbers. Paulson further outlined his plan by launching a website. The MLS Timbers would play in a renovated PGE Park, which was renamed to Jeld-Wen Field by the time the team made its MLS debut in 2011 and is now known as Providence Park, sharing with the Portland State University football team. On March 20, 2009, commissioner Don Garber confirmed in a news conference that Portland would receive the 18th franchise. Portland's expansion fee was $35 million.

=== Montreal (2012) ===
The city of Montreal had been in consideration by the Major League Soccer for a club since the league's founding and planning stages in 1993. In the fall of 2008, the Joey Saputo group was on a short list for the next round of expansion. On May 7, 2010, Commissioner Don Garber announced that Saputo and the Impact group (now CF Montréal) would join the league as its 19th club for the 2012 MLS season for an expansion fee of $40 million, with Stade Saputo being renovated to increase the seating capacity to around 20,000.

=== Dissolution of Chivas USA (2014) ===
Bookending the first growth phase of MLS was the dissolution of Chivas USA at the end of the 2014 regular season; this phase had begun with the addition of Chivas USA (along with Real Salt Lake) in 2005, and ended with Chivas USA's dissolution in 2014. The league bought the franchise and took over the operations from Jorge Vergara and Angélica Fuentes in February that year. The club had suffered poor performance on the field, low attendance and a series of discrimination lawsuits against the ownership. Commissioner Garber cited the "brand that was targeted specifically to the Hispanic market" and the belief that "the club could coexist with the Galaxy and share the StubHub Center" as mistakes.

== Second growth phase: 2015–2025 ==
MLS began its second growth phase in 2015, following contraction of Chivas USA in 2014. With MLS not having added any teams since 2012, the league set off on expanding from a 18-team league to a 30-team league by 2025. This phase is also marked by the significant increase in expansion fees. While the previous five expansion teams, Montreal (2012), Portland (2011), Vancouver (2011), Philadelphia (2010) and Seattle (2009) each paid expansion fees of $30–40 million, when the second growth phase began, Orlando (2015), Atlanta (2016), Minnesota (2016) and NYC (2015) paid fees of $70–100 million, marking a stark contrast to the previous phase. In 2019, Charlotte FC agreed to a reported $325 million expansion fee which was topped by a $500 million fee from San Diego FC in 2023.

=== New York City and Orlando (2015) ===
The 2015 MLS season marked the return of MLS to the state of Florida and the addition of a second team in the New York metro area. On June 27, 2012, MLS announced plans to build a new soccer-specific stadium in Queens, New York City, with a seating capacity of 25,000 and located near the USTA Billie Jean King National Tennis Center in Flushing Meadows. On May 21, 2013, MLS announced New York City FC and the location in NYC as the next expansion team. The team's rights were purchased by the English Premier League club Manchester City and the New York Yankees baseball team for the expansion fee of $100 million, and the team began play in 2015.

On October 25, 2010, Phil Rawlins and his investor group of Orlando City SC, announced their intentions of joining Major League Soccer within the next three to five years. In March 2012, Garber met with Orlando city and county officials, and said, "It's not a matter of if, but when", addressing Orlando's chances of joining MLS. In April 2013, the City of Orlando purchased downtown land to be used towards the construction of a $110 million MLS soccer stadium. Orange County Mayor Teresa Jacobs and Orlando Mayor Buddy Dyer reached an agreement on a deal to provide financial support for a variety of Orlando projects including the new MLS soccer stadium on August 8, 2013. The Orange County Board of Commissioners voted 5–2 on October 22, 2013, to approve the use of $20 million in tourist development tax funds to build an $84 million multi-purpose soccer stadium in downtown Orlando. On November 19, 2013, Orlando was officially announced as the league's newest team, and began play in MLS in 2015. The expansion fee was $70 million for the Orlando team.

=== Atlanta and Minnesota (2017) ===
The league announced it was awarding an expansion franchise in Atlanta to Atlanta Falcons owner and Home Depot co-founder Arthur Blank on April 16, 2014, with plans to begin play in 2017. The expansion fee was $70 million for the Atlanta team. The team shares Mercedes-Benz Stadium, which was completed in 2017, with the Falcons. Discussions between Blank and MLS "accelerated" following approval of the stadium plans in late 2013.

Atlanta became the third city in the southeastern United States in five months to announce an expansion team, following Orlando City in late 2013 and Miami, whose tentative approval was announced earlier in 2014. The Atlanta metropolitan area was at the time the largest media market without an MLS franchise. Previously, in October 2008, Arthur Blank's AMB Group had submitted a bid for an expansion franchise, but withdrew its bid in early 2009 due to its inability to have a stadium built.

On March 25, 2015, the league announced that it had awarded the 22nd MLS team to an investor group in Minneapolis–Saint Paul led by Bill McGuire, owner of the NASL team Minnesota United FC. Club president Nick Rodgers said he expected much of the team, including the name, logo, coach and some players, to remain intact. In addition to the Minnesota United bid, a group led by the Wilf family, owners of the NFL's Minnesota Vikings, had also been vying for a franchise, to play at the Vikings' new U.S. Bank Stadium, but were unsuccessful. The Wilfs would later become investors in Nashville's successful MLS bid.

The team had been expected to begin play in MLS in 2018, though the timing of their start date was described as "fluid." The ownership group did not meet its July 1, 2015, deadline to present stadium plans to MLS after the Minnesota state legislature failed to take up the club's proposal by the end of its session in May 2015. In October 2015, the team announced it had selected a stadium site in St. Paul. The expansion fee was $100 million for the team in Minnesota. The league later announced that Minnesota United would join MLS in 2017 and play in Minneapolis at the University of Minnesota's football home of TCF Bank Stadium until its new stadium was ready.

=== Los Angeles (2018) ===
On October 30, 2014, MLS commissioner Don Garber announced that a new team was awarded to Los Angeles and its ownership group led by Henry Nguyen for an expansion fee of $110 million. Other notable members of the ownership group included Peter Guber, Magic Johnson, Mia Hamm, Nomar Garciaparra, Tom Penn, and Tony Robbins, among others. The new team was announced with the working name, "Los Angeles Football Club", which later became its official name in September 2015. Originally set to begin play in 2017, the team did not begin until 2018 when construction of their new soccer-specific stadium, Banc of California Stadium, was completed.

=== Cincinnati (2019) ===
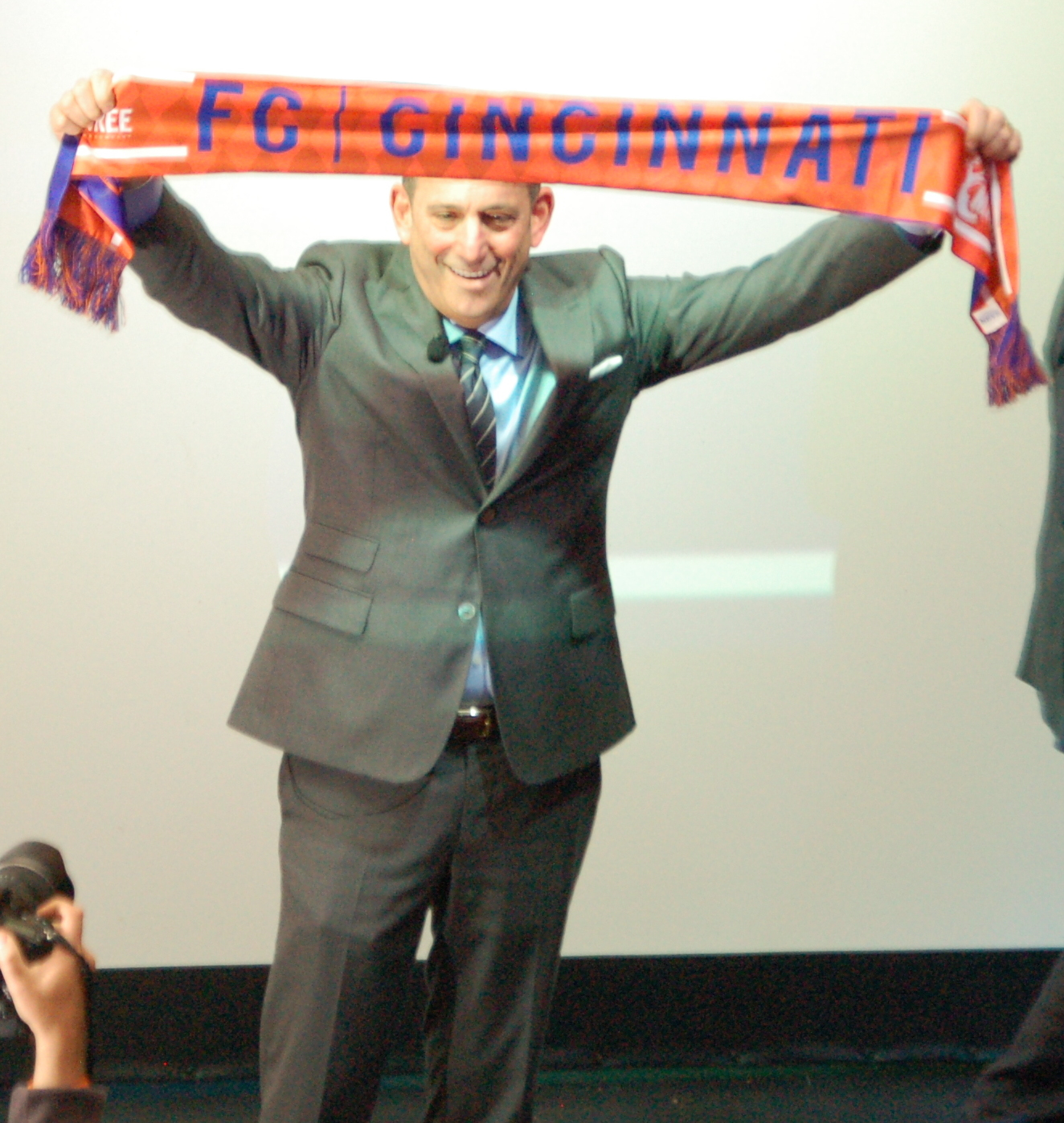
Garber holds up an FC Cincinnati scarf during his 2016 visit to Cincinnati.

On November 29, 2016, Don Garber visited with Cincinnati's mayor John Cranley, officials from FC Cincinnati of the USL, and civic and business leaders of the city to talk about a possible expansion. FC Cincinnati, in its first season in the USL in 2016, broke the USL's single-season attendance record, averaging 17,296 fans per game at Nippert Stadium. They also set the league's single-game playoff record for attendance with 30,187 spectators on October 2, 2016. On the heels of those attendance numbers, Cincinnati entered the expansion conversation. On June 12, 2017, FC Cincinnati revealed designs for a soccer-specific stadium to be built in conjunction with an MLS bid. FC Cincinnati was awarded an expansion on May 29, 2018, to start play in MLS in 2019 for the expansion fee of $150 million.

=== Miami and Nashville (2020) ===
Garber confirmed in a July 5, 2013, interview that Miami, Atlanta, Orlando, and San Antonio were all candidates for MLS expansion.

On February 5, 2014, the league announced that it would award a franchise in Miami to an investment group led by former player David Beckham, his business partner Simon Fuller, and Miami-based businessman Marcelo Claure for the expansion fee of $25 million. However, the ownership group's two stadium sites were rejected by city and county governments by July 2014.

In an August 2014 Q&A session, deputy commissioner Mark Abbott said Miami would be the 23rd team as long as a downtown stadium deal could be reached.

Commissioner Garber said he hoped to see Miami join the league with Atlanta in 2017, but repeated that the team would not play without political support for a downtown stadium.

The next development in the Beckham plan came on July 17, 2015, when Miami mayor Tomás Regalado announced a tentative deal with the ownership group, now known as Beckham United, for a new privately financed stadium in Little Havana next to Marlins Park, at the former site of the Orange Bowl. However, the plans for the Orange Bowl site fell through later that year after Beckham United was unable to secure deals with private owners of adjacent land.

In December of that year, Beckham United announced that a new stadium site, mostly private land but also containing a tract owned by Miami-Dade County, had been selected in Miami's Overtown neighborhood. The MLS governing board soon approved the location, and the Beckham group completed the purchase of the privately owned tracts in March 2016. Negotiations with county officials to assemble the final section of the stadium site are ongoing.

Beckham had received an option to buy an expansion franchise for $25 million as part of the contract he signed with the league when he joined the Los Angeles Galaxy.

In August 2016, a group of Nashville business leaders from several of the city's largest corporations formed the Nashville MLS Organizing Committee and began efforts to secure funding for an MLS stadium. The group, led by Bill Hagerty, pursued an MLS team immediately rather than work up the soccer pyramid. The group fully supports the recently awarded USL expansion team, Nashville SC, which began play in 2018. Both groups support each other in their common vision to grow the sport in Tennessee. In October 2017, the group unveiled their plans for $275 million stadium and redevelopment project, which was approved by the city in November. Nashville was granted a team for the expansion fee of $150 million on December 20, 2017, with the team was expected begin to play in 2020 season.

On January 29, 2018, MLS officially approved Beckham's expansion team in Miami with play expected to start in 2020.

=== Austin (2021) ===
On December 7, 2018, Garber announced in his annual State of the League news conference that "within the next few years MLS will become the first major sports league to have a team in the culturally dynamic city of Austin". On January 15, 2019, MLS officially announced that Austin had been granted a franchise for the expansion fee of $150 million and would begin play in 2021.

=== Charlotte (2022) ===
In 2017, Speedway Motorsports CEO Marcus Smith led an effort for MLS expansion to Charlotte that initially included a 20,000 to 30,000-seat stadium. In October 2017, however, the Charlotte city council confirmed that they would be unable to come up with the financing needed for the MLS deadline for expansion proposals, at which point the bid was effectively dead.

In March 2019, Carolina Panthers owner David Tepper and officials began discussions with MLS to start another bid for a Charlotte-based MLS team. After MLS announced that they would be expanding to 30 teams, the Panthers officially reactivated the bid.

MLS officially announced, on December 17, 2019, that Charlotte would be awarded with an MLS franchise and would begin play in the 2021 season. The expansion fee was reported to be $325M. The team plays in the Bank of America Stadium located in downtown Charlotte, Tepper and the ownership group announced under the team name, logo, and kits on July 22, 2020.

On July 17, 2020, MLS announced that the Charlotte expansion team's debut would be delayed by a year to 2022 due to the COVID-19 pandemic in North Carolina.

=== St. Louis (2023) ===
Jeff Cooper attempted in 2008 and 2009 to bring an MLS expansion team to St. Louis, only to have both bids turned down in favor of other cities; MLS was not impressed with the bid's financial backing and suggested Cooper expand his group of investors.

St. Louis announced in late 2014 that it was planning a new stadium to host both soccer and American football for the NFL's St. Louis Rams. In May 2015, Garber visited St. Louis to talk about a possible new stadium that could hold soccer games.

On January 12, 2016, the NFL's Rams relocated to Los Angeles from St. Louis and the Rams relocation initially accelerated the talks of an MLS expansion team. On January 27, 2016, St. Louis lawmaker, Keith English proposed a bill that would put a tax of not more than one-tenth of one percent on the ballot in St. Louis and St. Louis County, it also calls for the RSA to oversee the soccer stadium. The proposed tax would only go into effect if MLS awards a team to St. Louis by December 20, 2020. On February 17, 2016, the MLS2STL group was formed to bring an MLS team to the St. Louis area. In early 2017, a funding plan for a soccer-specific stadium adjacent to Union Station in downtown St. Louis was approved by the city's Board of Aldermen, before it was brought to a public vote on April 4, 2017, but the public vote failed.

On September 27, 2018, the St. Louis Post-Dispatch reported that a group was trying to bring a team to St. Louis. On October 9, 2018, the bid was effectively relaunched, with Carolyn Kindle Betz and other members of the Taylor family, principal owners of the Enterprise Holdings car rental company, as primary investors in the proposal. The stadium location remains the same as in the original 2016 location near Union Station. On November 30, 2018, the board of aldermen passed by 26 out of 28. On August 20, 2019, Garber announced at a press conference in St. Louis that the city had been granted a franchise to begin play in 2022 for the expansion fee of $200 million. The St. Louis expansion team's debut, originally scheduled for 2022, was later pushed to 2023 due to the COVID-19 pandemic in Missouri.

=== San Diego (2025) ===
In 1996, then-MLS commissioner Doug Logan called San Diego, California, a "prime candidate" for potential expansion for the newly established league. In 2014, Commissioner Garber mentioned San Diego as an expansion candidate, and again in April 2016. The potential ownership group included MLB San Diego Padres owner Peter Seidler. An MLS team in San Diego would be located close to two MLS teams in Los Angeles, as well as the Liga MX side Xolos of Tijuana. The NFL's Chargers 2017 relocation to Los Angeles accelerated the chances for an MLS expansion team in San Diego.

On February 20, 2017, a new plan for the Mission Valley site of the facility then known as Qualcomm Stadium was unveiled by a La Jolla investment group that was trying to lure a Major League Soccer team to San Diego. The former LA Galaxy striker Landon Donovan joined the San Diego ownership group on March 3, 2017. Donovan's group missed its attempt to bring an MLS team after losing the ballot measure to San Diego State University's new football stadium project in November 2018. By May 2022, MLS was interested in San Diego again as other groups began to pursue the city's franchise. In February 2023, Don Garber said San Diego remains an option for expansion.

On May 18, 2023, Don Garber announced at Snapdragon Stadium that San Diego would be the league's 30th team, starting play during the 2025 season. The San Diego FC ownership group includes Mohamed Mansour and the Sycuan Band of the Kumeyaay Nation, which paid an expansion fee of $500 million.

== Current expansion candidates ==
On April 18, 2019, the league announced it would expand to 30 teams. Ownership groups from Sacramento and St. Louis were given exclusive rights to negotiate for spots 28 and 29 at an expansion fee of $200 million each, while the league's Board of Governors deferred a decision on a fee and timetable for the 30th team. St. Louis was announced as an expansion team in August 2019. Sacramento was announced as an expansion team on October 21, 2019, but the owner later abandoned the bid. Charlotte was announced as an expansion team on December 17.

In February 2020, Garber stated there are more cities aiming to join the league and at some point they were to expand further. According to him, Las Vegas, Indianapolis, San Diego, Detroit, and Phoenix still had interest in joining the league, and Garber kept the discussions going.

In February 2023, Garber said that the league's plan was to announce the 30th team by the end of the year, and that the league was open to expanding beyond 30 teams. However, after San Diego was awarded the 30th team in May 2023, Garber said "I don't think sitting here today that we have any plan in the near future to go beyond 30 teams."

=== Las Vegas ===
The Las Vegas Sun reported on May 14, 2014, that a potential ownership group held talks about an expansion team in Las Vegas. The investor group, consisting of Findlay Sports and Entertainment and real estate developers, Cordish Company, acquired a site at Symphony Park in Downtown Las Vegas and planned to build a stadium there. Las Vegas Mayor, Carolyn Goodman, and the Findlay group expressed preference for a downtown stadium. League deputy commissioner Mark Abbott met with Mayor Goodman and toured the downtown area in July 2014.

On December 17, 2014, the Las Vegas City Council approved public funding of $56.5 million for the proposed soccer stadium in Symphony Park, contingent on MLS granting an expansion franchise to Las Vegas. Garber notified Las Vegas Mayor Carolyn Goodman on February 12, 2015, that MLS no longer considered Las Vegas as an expansion market until after 2018. The potential for a Las Vegas team was revived in January 2017 by the city council approaching a sports investment bank but an official bid was not reported by MLS.

In December 2021, Garber confirmed "Vegas is the frontrunner" and the 30th team was to be officially announced in the first quarter of 2022. Wes Edens and Nassef Sawiris, who co-own English football club Aston Villa had been in exclusive negotiations as prospective owners under their V Sports holding company, with the name Las Vegas Villains trademarked. By June 2022, those negotiations were ongoing. In February 2023, Don Garber said the Las Vegas bid remains active.

On April 30, 2026, a Las Vegas ownership group led by Grant Gustavson, son of Tamara Gustavson, submitted a formal offer to buy and relocate the Vancouver Whitecaps to Las Vegas. The group proposes playing at a temporary venue initially, with plans for a privately financed soccer-specific venue.

Las Vegas is currently home to Las Vegas Lights FC who play at Cashman Field.

=== Phoenix ===
In 2017, Phoenix entered the race for an expansion team. The bid for expansion is led by the ownership group of Phoenix Rising FC of the USLC including former Chelsea and Phoenix Rising FC player Didier Drogba. That year, Phoenix Rising signed an agreement with Goldman Sachs to help the funding of a new 20,000 person stadium on land purchased from the Salt River Pima-Maricopa Indian Community if selected. After Bally Sports Arizona agreed to air most Rising matches in March 2022, Phoenix was reported to have been drawn closer to becoming an MLS franchise.

In December 2024, Mesa mayor John Giles stated to local media that he had met with MLS officials and developers to build a stadium for a future team. A 200-acre (81 ha) site in northwestern Mesa once proposed for an Arizona Coyotes' arena was identified for a potential bid.

In November 2025, Mesa officials voted unanimously to turn the former Fiesta Mall location into a site to host a possible MLS and National Women's Soccer League (NWSL) team. The Fiesta Mall site is currently owned by Ernest Garcia II, and will be initially leased to Sunny Day Sports, led by Vicki Mayo. The company proposes a development that includes an enclosed 25,000 soccer-specific venue for a prospective NWSL franchise, along with MLS.

Phoenix is currently home to Phoenix Rising FC who play at Phoenix Rising Soccer Stadium.

== Failed or stalled expansion efforts ==
This section includes cities with bids that have either failed or stalled, or are otherwise not explicitly included in MLS's expansion roadmap, the latest of which was announced in December 2013.

=== Cleveland (2004–2006) ===
MLS announced in 2004 that Cleveland would be getting an expansion franchise for the 2005 season, as area businessman Bert Wolstein had signed a letter of intent to launch an MLS club. However, Wolstein ran into delays in trying to obtain public financing for a stadium, and died in 2004. In 2006 the Wolstein Sports and Entertainment Group proposed the construction of a soccer-specific stadium for an MLS club in the Cleveland suburb of Macedonia. However, Summit County voters rejected a tax to raise $104 million of the $165 million needed, environmental groups raised concerns about area wetlands, and the area was hit by the Great Recession of 2008.

In March 2014, Commissioner Garber said there had not been any developments regarding MLS expansion in Cleveland since talks were held "many years ago."

On April 19, 2025, Cleveland hosted their first MLS regular season game when the Columbus Crew and Inter Miami CF played a game at Huntington Bank Field, the home of the NFL's Cleveland Browns (who are also owned by Crew's owner Haslam Sports Group), with an attendance of 60,614 fans.

=== Miami (2008–2009) ===
A Miami expansion team led by Barcelona and Marcelo Claure, a Bolivian businessman based in the city, announced an expansion bid in October 2008, with plans to begin play in 2011. But in March 2009, the league and Barcelona announced that Miami was no longer a candidate due to local market conditions. Additionally, MLS expressed concerns about Miami's lack of fan interest in an MLS franchise, the fact that USL team Miami FC was not doing well, and the plan to use FIU Stadium relegating the team to a secondary tenant in a college football stadium with an artificial surface. However, Garber said that Miami would be an expansion target in the future. Claure later joined David Beckham's group of investors for the Miami expansion bid that was accepted by the league in 2014.

=== San Antonio (2011–2017) ===
A previous San Antonio expansion bid ended in 2005, when negotiations between the league and then-mayor Ed Garza ended. Incoming mayor Phil Hardberger criticized the proposed deal, while Garber claimed that the criticisms were politically motivated and hurt efforts to sell season tickets and recruit local investors.

In late 2011, San Antonio announced its bid to be MLS's 20th team. The city's North American Soccer League franchise, the San Antonio Scorpions, launched in 2012 and led the league in attendance in 2012 and 2013 seasons. In Commissioner Garber's December 2013 State of the League address, San Antonio was one of five cities listed on a presentation map of potential expansion locations. In March 2014, Garber said that expansion in the immediate future was "premature" for both San Antonio and Texas, though it was "something that is likely to happen".

In December 2014, Garber stated that the league was continuing to evaluate and receive updates on developments in San Antonio. Potential developments include the emergence of an outside investment group and the expansion plan of the current North American Soccer League stadium. In early December 2014, Garber revealed that San Antonio was "not as far along" as the three other cities under consideration at the time. But the league continues to monitor progress and efforts toward expansion in San Antonio.

On November 4, 2015, the city of San Antonio and Bexar County announced plans to purchase Toyota Field for $18 million with the intentions of acquiring an MLS franchise. Additionally, Spurs Sports & Entertainment, owners of the NBA's San Antonio Spurs, would hold a 20-year lease to operate the stadium; if SS&E fails to secure an MLS franchise for the stadium within 10 years, the group would owe the city and county a $5 million penalty. On December 22, 2015, the USL announced that Spurs Sports & Entertainment would operate the league's 31st team, San Antonio FC. The establishment of the club, along with the concurrent purchase of Toyota Field by the city of San Antonio and Bexar County, is part of a plan by local officials to obtain an expansion franchise in Major League Soccer. As a result, the Scorpions franchise was shut down.

On October 16, 2017, Columbus Crew owner Anthony Precourt announced his intentions of moving his club to Austin in 2019 if a new stadium in downtown Columbus was not built. As downtown Austin is approximately 75 miles (120 km) north of downtown San Antonio, the proposed relocation would have been in direct conflict with expansion efforts in San Antonio. However, Jimmy Haslam, owner of the NFL's Cleveland Browns, and Pete Edwards Jr. acquired the Crew in order to keep the club in Columbus and Precourt was granted rights to an expansion franchise in Austin.

=== Detroit (2016–2020) ===
Triple Sports & Entertainment, a firm owned by Andreas Apostolopoulos, planned to convert the Pontiac Silverdome into a soccer-specific stadium, and applied to MLS for an expansion franchise in June 2011, but without success. The company later submitted plans in July 2013 for the site that is being considered for the current Detroit expansion proposal, but was again unsuccessful.

NBA owners Dan Gilbert and Tom Gores unveiled in April 2016 a $1 billion plan to bring an MLS expansion team to Detroit. MLS Commissioner Don Garber has said that Detroit is on the list of cities that could get an expansion team in 2020, and has stated that MLS' interest in Detroit hinges on the fate of the 15-acre site of the stalled Wayne County jail development, which can connect the Greektown Entertainment District, Eastern Market and the three other sports facilities – Comerica Park, Ford Field, and Little Caesars Arena. Their plan received a boost at the end of July when Wayne County Executive Warren Evans announced that he had instructed his team to work towards a final deal on moving the jail and allowing Gilbert and Gores to build the stadium.

Detroit was considered by MLS to be one of the frontrunners for a 2020 bid, but MLS soured on Detroit when the ownership group decided not to build a soccer-specific stadium and to use Ford Field instead.

=== Raleigh (2016–2019) ===
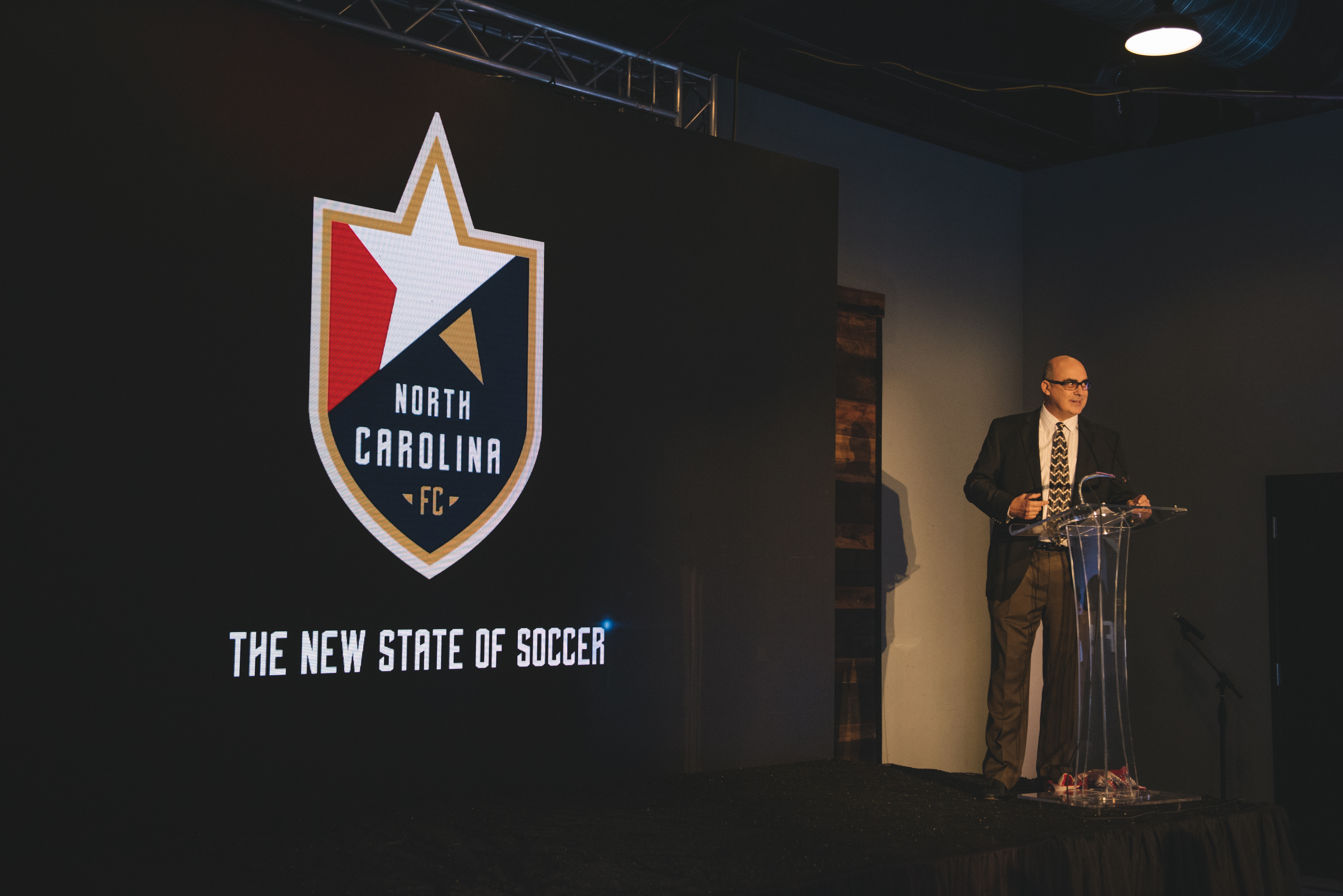
Owner Steve Malik announces rebranding to North Carolina FC

On December 6, 2016, Carolina Railhawks (later rebranded as North Carolina FC) owner Steve Malik announced a push for Raleigh's minor league team to become an MLS team, and build a privately funded $150 million, 22,000-seat stadium in Wake County. On June 18, 2019, the team unveiled plans for a 20,000-seat stadium as part of a $1.9 billion mixed use development in downtown Raleigh, intended to boost their MLS bid.

=== Tampa Bay (2016–2017) ===
In December 2016, MLS confirmed that Tampa / St. Petersburg was one of its ten potential expansion cities. Bill Edwards, the majority owner of the Tampa Bay Rowdies started a campaign to join the league. On May 2, 2017, a special election referendum was held in St. Petersburg to vote on the city negotiating a 25-year land lease for the Tampa Bay Rowdies current waterfront Al Lang Stadium and increasing capacity to 18,000 pending MLS expansion acceptance. The vote was 87% in favor of Al Lang Stadium redesign/expansion, and 13% against.

=== Sacramento (2017–2021) ===
In December 2011, a group led by former California Assembly Speaker Fabian Núñez began exploring the possibility of landing an MLS franchise for the Sacramento area, with the suburb of Elk Grove as a possible stadium site. On March 13, 2013, the Elk Grove city council voted unanimously to study potential sites for a soccer-specific stadium in the city that could host either an MLS or NASL team.

Sacramento was granted a USL Pro team that began play in the 2014 season. A group of investors, led by local business leader Warren Smith, expressed their hope to eventually convert this franchise to an MLS team. In November 2013, Smith restated his goal of having the team, christened Sacramento Republic FC, ascend to MLS in 2016.

In August 2014, owners of the Sacramento Kings NBA basketball team led by businessman Vivek Ranadivé expressed an interest in buying Republic FC with the ultimate goal of elevating the team to MLS. They met with league officials during the week of the 2014 MLS All-Star Game, and deputy commissioner Mark Abbott said league executives would visit the city and tour possible stadium locations. Kings owner Ranadive announced in January 2015 that he had joined the Republic ownership group, in a move seen as bolstering the city's chances of landing an MLS berth. Also in January 2015, the York family, owners of the NFL's San Francisco 49ers, agreed to invest in the Republic.

Sacramento's bid is also strengthened by its fan support. Upon their debut in 2014, the Republic set a USL single-game attendance record by selling out their first-ever home game at 20,000-seat Hughes Stadium; since moving to the smaller, soccer-specific stadium now known as Papa Murphy's Park midway through 2014, the team has continued to play in front of capacity crowds. As of January 2015, the club had nearly 10,000 ticket deposits as part of its "Built for MLS" campaign.

In March 2015, Sacramento mayor Kevin Johnson announced a joint initiative of the city and the club dubbed "Operation Turnkey", which would have stadium construction ready to begin should one of the other expansion candidates without a firm stadium plan fail to come up with one or the league decided to expand beyond 24 teams. In April 2016, MLS commissioner Don Garber announced that the league would expand to 28 teams and said "I hope, and fully expect, Sacramento to be one (of the 28)".

On February 4, 2017, after the official bid package was submitted without the Republic name or brand, Sacramento mayor Darrell Steinberg announced an agreement in principle for the Republic to be acquired by Sac Soccer & Entertainment Holdings, the company behind the submitted bid. Should the city's bid for an MLS expansion team succeed, it will indeed enter the league as Sacramento Republic FC. In July 2017, the group began preparations for building a 19,621-seat stadium in downtown Sacramento for the bid. By October, the group had 10,000 commitments for season tickets for the proposed MLS team.

On January 22, 2019, billionaire Ron Burkle was announced as the Republic's new lead investor to satisfy MLS requirements. Burkle has held a controlling stake in the NHL's Pittsburgh Penguins since 1999, and previously made an attempt to buy the Sacramento Kings. Burkle also purchased the Republic's proposed stadium site at the Sacramento Railyards, along with an additional 14 acres to be developed into an entertainment district. On October 21, 2019, the Republic was officially announced as the 29th team in Major League Soccer, scheduled to join the league in 2022.

On July 17, 2020, Sacramento Republic and MLS announced that the team would instead begin play in 2023, due to delays from the COVID-19 pandemic in California. However, on February 26, 2021, MLS announced that Burkle "had decided not to acquire an expansion team in Sacramento," and that the league would continue to work with Sacramento authorities on the future of the expansion plan. As a result, the bid was considered to be on indefinite hiatus, and on March 1 the Republic's logo was removed from the banner at the top of MLSSoccer.com. Burkle similarly rejected a Sacramento expansion team in the National Women's Soccer League in conjunction with the Republic bid, and on June 8, 2021, instead announced his investment in San Diego Wave FC to begin play in the 2022 NWSL season.

One year later, the Republic's Cinderella run to the 2022 U.S. Open Cup Final drew national attention, and inspired hopes of reviving the MLS expansion bid through a new investor group.

=== Louisville (2019–2021) ===
No current plans are in place for Louisville, Kentucky, to bid for a franchise in the league. Louisville City FC plays in the USL and was in the top 4 for league attendance in the 2019 season. The team has constructed a stadium in downtown Louisville. MLS has had discussions with the ownership of the team in the past, although the team president has no plans to place a bid at this time. In June 2020, the Mayor of Louisville's office confirmed that the city has been in contact with the Major League Soccer, in coordination with Louisville City FC, for a possible expansion in the future.

=== Other efforts ===
Rochester, New York, had been mentioned as an expansion candidate due to the success of the Rochester Rhinos. The Rhinos won the US Open Cup in 1999 – the only non-MLS team to win the Cup since MLS began play three years earlier – and the Rhinos averaged over 10,000 fans from 1999 to 2005. In 2006, Don Garber stated: "At some point we want to find a way we can have an MLS team in Rochester." However, the Rhinos saw a downturn in attendance and finances, and the city is no longer under consideration by MLS. The team ceased operations in 2023.

Ottawa was a longshot candidate throughout late 2008 and early 2009 for one of two slots for MLS expansion, but the push ended in March 2009 when MLS selected Vancouver and Portland instead. On June 20, 2011, Ottawa was awarded a NASL expansion franchise which began play as Ottawa Fury FC at TD Place Stadium in 2014; Fury FC moved to USL after the 2016 season. The team ceased operations following the 2019 season.

MLS announced in May 2010 its desire for a second franchise in the New York City area. The former owners of the New York Cosmos expressed interest in an MLS expansion franchise, but negotiations between MLS and the Cosmos broke down, and the new Cosmos began playing in the North American Soccer League in 2013. The league also met with other prospective ownership groups for a New York expansion team. For example, MLS held talks with New York Mets owner Fred Wilpon. MLS awarded the second New York franchise to New York City FC in May 2013. Garber confirmed in April 2014 that there would not be a third New York team after the New York Red Bulls and New York City FC.

Indianapolis launched an official bid in January 2017 to upgrade their NASL franchise, the Indy Eleven, to an MLS expansion member, but their bid was not chosen.

== Expansion and dispersal drafts ==
Draft	Date	Team(s) involved	Players drafted	First overall pick
1997	November 6, 1997	Chicago Fire; Miami Fusion	24	Danny Pena (Los Angeles Galaxy)
2002; Allocation/Dispersal	January 11, 2002	Miami Fusion; Tampa Bay Mutiny	19	Pablo Mastroeni (Colorado Rapids; allocation); Chris Henderson (Colorado Rapids; dispersal)
2004	November 19, 2004	Chivas USA; Real Salt Lake	20	Arturo Torres (Los Angeles Galaxy)
2006	November 17, 2006	Toronto FC	10	Paulo Nagamura (Los Angeles Galaxy)
2007	November 21, 2007	San Jose Earthquakes	10	Ryan Cochrane (Houston Dynamo)
2008	November 26, 2008	Seattle Sounders FC	14	Nate Jaqua (Houston Dynamo)
2009	November 25, 2009	Philadelphia Union	10	Jordan Harvey (Colorado Rapids)
2010	November 24, 2010	Portland Timbers; Vancouver Whitecaps FC	20	Dax McCarty (FC Dallas)
2011	November 23, 2011	Montreal Impact	10	Brian Ching (Houston Dynamo)
2014; Dispersal/Expansion	November 19, 2014 (dispersal); December 10, 2014 (expansion)	Chivas USA (dispersal); New York City FC (expansion); Orlando City SC (expansion)	7 (dispersal); 20 (expansion)	Dan Kennedy (to FC Dallas; dispersal); Donovan Ricketts (Portland Timbers; expansion)
2016	December 13, 2016	Atlanta United FC; Minnesota United FC	10	Donny Toia (Montreal Impact)
2017	December 12, 2017	Los Angeles FC	5	Tyler Miller (Seattle Sounders FC)
2018	December 11, 2018	FC Cincinnati	5	Darren Mattocks (D.C. United)
2019	November 19, 2019	Inter Miami CF; Nashville SC	10	Ben Sweat (New York City FC)
2020	December 15, 2020	Austin FC	5	Danny Hoesen (San Jose Earthquakes)
2021	December 14, 2021	Charlotte FC	5	McKinze Gaines (Austin FC)
2022	November 11, 2022	St. Louis City SC	5	Nicholas Gioacchini (Orlando City)
2024	December 11, 2024	San Diego FC	5	Heine Gikling Bruseth (Orlando City)

== See also ==
- Major League Soccer defunct clubs
- Timeline of Major League Soccer

== Bibliography ==
- Goldblatt, David. The Ball is Round: A Global History of Football. Penguin Books (2007).
- Tossell, David. Playing for Uncle Sam: The Brits' Story of the North American Soccer League. Mainstream Publishing (2003).
- Wangerin, David. Soccer in a Football World: The Story of America's Forgotten Game. WSC Books (2006).
