= Eastern Conference (MLS) =

Collection of top-flight soccer teams in North America

- Eastern MLS
- League: Major League Soccer
- Sport: Football
- Founded: 1996
- No. of teams: 15
- Most recent champions: Inter Miami CF (2025) (1st title)
- Most titles: D.C. United (5 titles)

Current Eastern Conference teams

The Eastern Conference (French: Association de l'Est) is one of Major League Soccer's two conferences, along with the Western Conference. The division of the conferences broadly follows the path of the Mississippi River from the Great Lakes to the Gulf of Mexico, with clubs east of the river in the Eastern Conference.

As of 2023, the Eastern Conference contains 15 teams. The conference has produced 18 Supporters' Shield champions and 12 MLS Cup winners in Major League Soccer's first 31 seasons. In 2000 and 2001, the conference was referred to as the Eastern Division when Major League Soccer briefly reorganized into three divisions.

== 2026 standings ==
MLS Eastern Conference table (2026)
Pos	Team	Pld	W	L	T	GF	GA	GD	Pts	Qualification
1	Nashville SC	34	23	3	8	71	25	+46	77	Qualification for round one and the CONCACAF Champions Cup round one
2	Inter Miami CF	34	16	6	12	80	59	+21	60	Qualification for round one
3	New England Revolution	34	18	12	4	55	47	+8	58	Qualification for round one
4	Chicago Fire FC	34	16	11	7	64	54	+10	55	Qualification for round one
5	Charlotte FC	34	15	10	9	66	51	+15	54	Qualification for round one
6	Philadelphia Union	34	14	12	8	66	52	+14	50	Qualification for round one
7	Columbus Crew	34	14	15	5	59	52	+7	47	Qualification for round one
8	Orlando City SC	34	13	14	7	63	78	−15	46	Qualification for the wild card round
9	FC Cincinnati	34	12	12	10	67	75	−8	46	Qualification for the wild card round
10	New York Red Bulls	34	12	16	6	48	62	−14	42	
11	New York City FC	34	10	12	12	49	45	+4	42	
12	Toronto FC	34	9	13	12	52	67	−15	39	
13	Atlanta United FC	34	9	19	6	43	60	−17	33	
14	D.C. United	34	7	15	12	39	61	−22	33	
15	CF Montréal	34	6	20	8	37	69	−32	26	

Source: MLS
Rules for classification: 1) points; 2) total wins; 3) total goal differential; 4) total goals scored; 5) fewer disciplinary points; 6) away goal differential; 7) away goals scored; 8) home goals differential; 9) home goals scored; 10) coin toss (2 clubs tied) or drawing of lots (≥3 clubs tied)

== Members ==
=== Current ===
Team	City	Stadium
Atlanta United FC	Atlanta, Georgia	Mercedes-Benz Stadium
Charlotte FC	Charlotte, North Carolina	Bank of America Stadium
Chicago Fire FC	Chicago, Illinois	Soldier Field
Columbus Crew	Columbus, Ohio	ScottsMiracle-Gro Field
FC Cincinnati	Cincinnati, Ohio	TQL Stadium
D.C. United	Washington, D.C.	Audi Field
Inter Miami CF	Fort Lauderdale, Florida	Chase Stadium
CF Montréal	Montreal, Quebec	Saputo Stadium
Nashville SC	Nashville, Tennessee	Geodis Park
New England Revolution	Foxborough, Massachusetts	Gillette Stadium
New York City FC	New York City, New York	Yankee Stadium
New York Red Bulls	Harrison, New Jersey	Sports Illustrated Stadium
Orlando City SC	Orlando, Florida	Inter.co Stadium
Philadelphia Union	Chester, Pennsylvania	Subaru Park
Toronto FC	Toronto, Ontario	BMO Field

=== Timeline ===
Eastern Conference member Western Conference member Central Division member

== Conference lineups by year ==
=== 1996–97 (5 teams) ===
- Columbus Crew
- D.C. United
- New England Revolution
- New York/New Jersey MetroStars
- Tampa Bay Mutiny

Changes from 1995: Creation of the Major League Soccer.

=== 1998–99 (6 teams) ===
- Columbus Crew
- D.C. United
- New York MetroStars
- Miami Fusion
- New England Revolution
- Tampa Bay Mutiny

Changes from 1997: New York/New Jersey MetroStars simplified their name to New York MetroStars; the Miami Fusion were added in the 1998 expansion.

=== 2000–01 (as Eastern Division) (4 teams) ===
- D.C. United
- New York MetroStars
- Miami Fusion
- New England Revolution

Changes from 1999: The Eastern Conference changed its name to Eastern Division with the creation of the Central Division; the Columbus Crew and the Tampa Bay Mutiny moved to the new division.

=== 2002–04 (5 teams) ===
- Chicago Fire
- Columbus Crew
- D.C. United
- New York MetroStars
- New England Revolution

Changes from 2001: The Eastern Division changed back its name to Eastern Conference following the contraction of the Miami Fusion and the Tampa Bay Mutiny, resulting in the disbanding of the Central Division; Chicago Fire and Columbus Crew moved in from the Central Division

=== 2005 (6 teams) ===
- Chicago Fire FC
- Columbus Crew
- D.C. United
- Kansas City Wizards
- New York MetroStars
- New England Revolution

Changes from 2004: Kansas City Wizards moved in from the Western Conference.

=== 2006 (6 teams) ===
- Chicago Fire FC
- Columbus Crew
- D.C. United
- Kansas City Wizards
- New England Revolution
- New York Red Bulls

Changes from 2005: The New York MetroStars were bought by Red Bull and changed their name to New York Red Bulls.

=== 2007–09 (7 teams) ===
- Chicago Fire FC
- Columbus Crew
- D.C. United
- Kansas City Wizards
- New England Revolution
- New York Red Bulls
- Toronto FC

Changes from 2006: Toronto FC was added in the 2007 expansion.

=== 2010 (8 teams) ===
- Chicago Fire FC
- Columbus Crew
- D.C. United
- Kansas City Wizards
- New England Revolution
- New York Red Bulls
- Philadelphia Union
- Toronto FC

Changes from 2009: Philadelphia Union was added in the 2010 expansion.

=== 2011 (9 teams) ===
- Chicago Fire FC
- Columbus Crew
- D.C. United
- Houston Dynamo
- New England Revolution
- New York Red Bulls
- Philadelphia Union
- Sporting Kansas City
- Toronto FC

Changes from 2010: The Kansas City Wizards changed their name to Sporting Kansas City; Houston Dynamo moved in from the Western Conference.

=== 2012–14 (10 teams) ===
- Chicago Fire FC
- Columbus Crew
- D.C. United
- Houston Dynamo
- Montreal Impact
- New England Revolution
- New York Red Bulls
- Philadelphia Union
- Sporting Kansas City
- Toronto FC

Changes from 2011: Montreal Impact was added in the 2012 expansion.

=== 2015–16 (10 teams) ===
- Chicago Fire FC
- Columbus Crew SC
- D.C. United
- Montreal Impact
- New England Revolution
- New York Red Bulls
- New York City FC
- Orlando City SC
- Philadelphia Union
- Toronto FC

Changes from 2014: New York City FC and Orlando City SC were added as expansion franchises; Sporting Kansas City and Houston Dynamo moved out to the Western Conference; Columbus Crew adds "SC" to the official team name.

=== 2017–18 (11 teams) ===
- Atlanta United FC
- Chicago Fire FC
- Columbus Crew SC
- D.C. United
- Montreal Impact
- New England Revolution
- New York Red Bulls
- New York City FC
- Orlando City SC
- Philadelphia Union
- Toronto FC

Changes from 2016: Atlanta United FC was added in the 2017 expansion.

=== 2019 (12 teams) ===
- Atlanta United FC
- Chicago Fire FC
- Columbus Crew SC
- FC Cincinnati
- D.C. United
- Montreal Impact
- New England Revolution
- New York Red Bulls
- New York City FC
- Orlando City SC
- Philadelphia Union
- Toronto FC

Changes from 2018: FC Cincinnati was added in the 2019 expansion.

=== 2020 (14 teams) ===
- Atlanta United FC
- Chicago Fire FC
- Columbus Crew SC
- FC Cincinnati
- D.C. United
- Inter Miami CF
- Montreal Impact
- Nashville SC
- New England Revolution
- New York Red Bulls
- New York City FC
- Orlando City SC
- Philadelphia Union
- Toronto FC

Changes from 2019: Inter Miami CF was added in the 2020 expansion, Nashville SC was added since the MLS is Back Tournament up to the end of the 2020 season; Chicago Fire SC was renamed Chicago Fire FC.

=== 2021 (14 teams) ===
- Atlanta United FC
- Chicago Fire FC
- FC Cincinnati
- Columbus Crew
- D.C. United
- Inter Miami CF
- CF Montréal
- Nashville SC
- New England Revolution
- New York Red Bulls
- New York City FC
- Orlando City SC
- Philadelphia Union
- Toronto FC

Changes from 2020: Nashville SC moved in from the Western Conference; the Montreal Impact was renamed Club de Foot Montréal. Columbus Crew SC was briefly renamed to Columbus SC and then to Columbus Crew.

=== 2022 (14 teams) ===
- Atlanta United FC
- Charlotte FC
- Chicago Fire FC
- FC Cincinnati
- Columbus Crew
- D.C. United
- Inter Miami CF
- CF Montréal
- New England Revolution
- New York Red Bulls
- New York City FC
- Orlando City SC
- Philadelphia Union
- Toronto FC

Changes from 2021: Charlotte FC was added as a then-unnamed expansion franchise in 2019, with its first season initially set for 2021 but delayed by a year due to the COVID-19 pandemic. Nashville SC moved back to the Western Conference.

=== 2023–26 (15 teams) ===
- Atlanta United FC
- Charlotte FC
- Chicago Fire FC
- FC Cincinnati
- Columbus Crew
- D.C. United
- Inter Miami CF
- CF Montréal
- Nashville SC
- New England Revolution
- New York Red Bulls
- New York City FC
- Orlando City SC
- Philadelphia Union
- Toronto FC

Changes from 2022: Nashville SC was moved back to the Eastern Conference as expansion side St. Louis City SC was added to the Western Conference.

== Eastern Conference playoff champions by year ==
Note: The conference finals were a best-of-three series through 2001 (including the MLS semifinals in 2000 and 2001, when a conference playoff format was not used). Matches tied after regulation were decided by a shoot-out. In 2002, a similar format was used except that draws were allowed and the team earning the most points advanced. From 2003 through 2011, the Finals were a single match. Matches tied after regulation moved to extra time (Golden goal extra time was implemented for 2003 only), then a shoot-out if necessary. Beginning in 2012, the finals were a two-match aggregate series. The away goals rule for series that finished even on aggregate was first implemented in 2014. Extra time and shoot-outs are used if necessary, although away goals did not apply in extra time. In 2019, the playoffs returned to a single match format (including the conference finals), hosted by the higher ranked team through the regular season.

**Bold**	MLS Cup champions

Season	Champions	Score	Runners-up
1996	**D.C. United**	2 matches to 0	Tampa Bay Mutiny
1997	**D.C. United**	2 matches to 0	Columbus Crew
1998	D.C. United	2 matches to 1	Columbus Crew
1999	**D.C. United**	2 matches to 1	Columbus Crew
2000	No conference playoffs		
2001	No conference playoffs		
2002	No conference playoffs		
2003	Chicago Fire	1–0 (a.e.t.)	New England Revolution
2004	**D.C. United**	3–3 (4–3 p)	New England Revolution
2005	New England Revolution	1–0	Chicago Fire
2006	New England Revolution	1–0	D.C. United
2007	New England Revolution	1–0	Chicago Fire
2008	**Columbus Crew**	2–1	Chicago Fire
2009	**Real Salt Lake**^{W}	0–0 (5–4 p)	Chicago Fire
2010	**Colorado Rapids**^{W}	1–0	San Jose Earthquakes^{W}
2011	Houston Dynamo	2–0	Sporting Kansas City
2012	Houston Dynamo	4–2 agg.	D.C. United
2013	**Sporting Kansas City**	2–1 agg.	Houston Dynamo
2014	New England Revolution	4–3 agg.	New York Red Bulls
2015	Columbus Crew SC	2–1 agg.	New York Red Bulls
2016	Toronto FC	7–5 agg. (a.e.t.)	Montreal Impact
2017	**Toronto FC**	1–0 agg.	Columbus Crew SC
2018	**Atlanta United FC**	3–1 agg.	New York Red Bulls
2019	Toronto FC	2–1	Atlanta United FC
2020	**Columbus Crew SC**	1–0	New England Revolution
2021	**New York City FC**	2–1	Philadelphia Union
2022	Philadelphia Union	3–1	New York City FC
2023	**Columbus Crew**	3–2 (a.e.t.)	FC Cincinnati
2024	New York Red Bulls	1–0	Orlando City SC
2025	**Inter Miami CF**	5–1	New York City FC

^{W} – Western Conference team.

== Eastern Conference regular season champions by year ==
No trophy is awarded for leading the conference standings at the end of the regular season, unless the regular season leader also wins the Supporters' Shield. The winner of the Conference play-offs is considered the Conference champion. Since 2013, the winner of each conference has qualified for the CONCACAF Champions Cup.

Three clubs have topped the Eastern Conference standings at the end of the regular season, won the Supporters' Shield, the Eastern Conference (MLS) and the MLS Cup; D.C. United, twice, Columbus Crew and Toronto FC. Toronto in 2017 also won the Canadian Championship, being the only MLS team to therefore take a clean sweep of all titles available to them.

	also won Supporters' Shield
Italic	also won Eastern Conference playoff final
**Bold**	also won MLS Cup

Season	Team	Record (W–L–T) (GD)	Playoffs result
1996	Tampa Bay Mutiny	20–12–0^ (+15)	Lost conference finals
1997	**D.C. United**	21–11–0^ (+17)	**Won** MLS Cup
1998	D.C. United	24–8–0^ (+30)	Lost MLS Cup
1999	**D.C. United**	23–9–0^ (+22)	**Won** MLS Cup
2000	MetroStars	17–12–3 (+8)	Lost Semifinals
2001	Miami Fusion†	16–5–5 (+21)	Lost Semifinals
2002	New England Revolution	12–14–2 (0)	Lost MLS Cup
2003	Chicago Fire	15–7–8 (+10)	Lost conference finals
2004	Columbus Crew	12–5–13 (+8)	Lost conference semifinals
2005	New England Revolution	17–7–8 (+18)	Lost MLS Cup
2006	D.C. United	15–7–10 (+14)	Lost conference finals
2007	D.C. United	16–7–7 (+22)	Lost conference semifinals
2008	**Columbus Crew**	17–7–6 (+14)	**Won** MLS Cup
2009	Columbus Crew	13–7–10 (+10)	Lost conference semifinals
2010	New York Red Bulls	15–9–6 (+9)	Lost conference semifinals
2011	Sporting Kansas City	13–9–12 (+10)	Lost conference finals
2012	Sporting Kansas City	18–7–9 (+15)	Lost conference semifinals
2013	New York Red Bulls	17–9–8 (+17)	Lost conference semifinals
2014	D.C. United	17–9–8 (+15)	Lost conference semifinals
2015	New York Red Bulls	18–10–6 (+19)	Lost conference finals
2016	New York Red Bulls	16–9–9 (+17)	Lost conference semifinals
2017	**Toronto FC**	20–5–9 (+37)	**Won** MLS Cup
2018	New York Red Bulls	22–7–5 (+29)	Lost conference finals
2019	New York City FC	18–6–10 (+21)	Lost conference semifinals
2020	Philadelphia Union	14–4–5 (+24)	Lost first round
2021	New England Revolution	22–5–7 (+24)	Lost conference semifinals
2022	Philadelphia Union	19–5–10 (+46)	Lost MLS Cup
2023	FC Cincinnati	20–5–9 (+18)	Lost conference finals
2024	Inter Miami CF	22–4–8 (+30)	Lost first round
2025	Philadelphia Union	20–8–6 (+22)	Lost conference semifinals
2026	Nashville SC	23–3–8 (+46)	TBD

^ – MLS did not have draws until the 2000 season.
† – Miami Fusion were declared winners of the Eastern Division in 2001 after the September 11, 2001 terrorist attacks forced the cancellation of the rest of the regular season. The MLS Cup playoffs began on September 20.

== MLS East at the MLS All-Star Game ==
In 1996, 1997, 1999, 2000, 2001, and 2004, the Major League Soccer All-Star Game was contested between an all-star team from the Eastern Conference and an all-star team from the Western Conference. In total, the MLS East all-star team has 4 wins, 1 draw, and 1 loss against the west.

Yearly results
Year	Result	Score	Series
1996	Won	3–2	East 1–0–0
1997	Won	5–4	East 2–0–0
1999	Lost	4–6	East 2–1–0
2000	Won	9–4	East 3–1–0
2001	Tied	6–6	East 3–1–1
2004	Won	3–2	East 4–1–1

== See also ==
- Western Conference (MLS)
- Central Division (MLS)
