= Western Conference (MLS) =

Collection of top-flight soccer teams in North America

- Western MLS
- League: Major League Soccer
- Sport: Soccer
- Founded: 1996
- No. of teams: 15
- Most recent champions: Vancouver Whitecaps FC (2025) (1st title)
- Most titles: LA Galaxy (8 titles)

Current Western Conference teams

The Western Conference is one of the two Major League Soccer conferences, along with the Eastern Conference. The division of the conferences broadly follows the path of the Mississippi River from the Great Lakes to the Gulf of Mexico, with clubs on, or west of the river in the Western Conference.

As of 2025, the Western Conference contains 15 teams. The conference has produced 11 Supporters' Shield champions and 18 MLS Cup winners in Major League Soccer's first 29 seasons. In 2000 and 2001, the conference was referred to as the Western Division when Major League Soccer briefly reorganized into three divisions.

== 2026 standings ==
MLS Western Conference table (2026)
Pos	Team	Pld	W	L	T	GF	GA	GD	Pts	Qualification
1	Vancouver Whitecaps FC	34	19	8	7	74	34	+40	64	Qualification for round one and the CONCACAF Champions Cup round one
2	FC Dallas	34	16	8	10	62	51	+11	58	Qualification for round one
3	St. Louis City SC	34	15	10	9	59	48	+11	54	Qualification for round one
4	San Jose Earthquakes	34	14	10	10	57	51	+6	52	Qualification for round one
5	Houston Dynamo FC	34	14	11	9	43	43	0	51	Qualification for round one
6	Los Angeles FC	34	12	11	11	52	40	+12	47	Qualification for round one
7	Portland Timbers	34	13	14	7	62	61	+1	46	Qualification for round one
8	Seattle Sounders FC	34	12	12	10	44	46	−2	46	Qualification for the wild card round
9	Real Salt Lake	34	13	15	6	53	52	+1	45	Qualification for the wild card round
10	Minnesota United FC	34	11	12	11	56	58	−2	44	
11	LA Galaxy	34	11	12	11	50	57	−7	44	
12	Colorado Rapids	34	12	15	7	47	50	−3	43	
13	San Diego FC	34	9	14	11	57	63	−6	38	
14	Austin FC	34	8	16	10	42	65	−23	34	
15	Sporting Kansas City	34	7	22	5	40	81	−41	26	

Source: MLS
Rules for classification: 1) points; 2) total wins; 3) total goal differential; 4) total goals scored; 5) fewer disciplinary points; 6) away goal differential; 7) away goals scored; 8) home goals differential; 9) home goals scored; 10) coin toss (2 clubs tied) or drawing of lots (≥3 clubs tied)

== Members ==
=== Current ===
Team	City	Stadium
Austin FC	Austin, Texas	Q2 Stadium
Colorado Rapids	Commerce City, Colorado	Dick's Sporting Goods Park
FC Dallas	Frisco, Texas	Toyota Stadium
Houston Dynamo FC	Houston, Texas	Shell Energy Stadium
LA Galaxy	Carson, California	Dignity Health Sports Park
Los Angeles FC	Los Angeles, California	BMO Stadium
Minnesota United FC	Saint Paul, Minnesota	Allianz Field
Portland Timbers	Portland, Oregon	Providence Park
Real Salt Lake	Sandy, Utah	America First Field
San Diego FC	San Diego, California	Snapdragon Stadium
San Jose Earthquakes	San Jose, California	PayPal Park
Seattle Sounders FC	Seattle, Washington	Lumen Field
Sporting Kansas City	Kansas City, Kansas	Sporting Park
St. Louis City SC	St. Louis, Missouri	Energizer Park
Vancouver Whitecaps FC	Vancouver, British Columbia	BC Place

=== Timeline ===
Western Conference member Eastern Conference member Central Division member

== Conference lineups by year ==
=== 1996 (5 teams) ===
- Colorado Rapids
- Dallas Burn
- Kansas City Wiz
- Los Angeles Galaxy
- San Jose Clash

Changes from 1995: Creation of the Major League Soccer.

=== 1997 (5 teams) ===
- Colorado Rapids
- Dallas Burn
- Kansas City Wizards
- Los Angeles Galaxy
- San Jose Clash

Changes from 1996: Kansas City changed their name from Wiz to Wizards.

=== 1998–99 (6 teams) ===
- Chicago Fire
- Colorado Rapids
- Dallas Burn
- Kansas City Wizards
- Los Angeles Galaxy
- San Jose Clash

Changes from 1997: Chicago Fire was added in the 1998 expansion.

=== 2000–01 (as Western Division) (4 teams) ===
- Colorado Rapids
- Kansas City Wizards
- Los Angeles Galaxy
- San Jose Earthquakes

Changes from 1999: The Western Conference renamed itself the Western Division upon the creation of the Central Division; Chicago Fire and Dallas Burn moved into the new division; The San Jose Clash renamed to the Earthquakes.

=== 2002–04 (5 teams) ===
- Colorado Rapids
- Dallas Burn
- Kansas City Wizards
- Los Angeles Galaxy
- San Jose Earthquakes

Changes from 2001: The Western Division renamed back to Western Conference following the contraction of the Miami Fusion and the Tampa Bay Mutiny, resulting in the disbanding of the Central Division; Dallas Burn moved in from the Central Division.

=== 2005 (6 teams) ===
- Chivas USA
- Colorado Rapids
- FC Dallas
- Los Angeles Galaxy
- Real Salt Lake
- San Jose Earthquakes

Changes from 2004: Chivas USA and Real Salt Lake were added in the 2005 expansion; Kansas City Wizards moved to the Eastern Conference; The Dallas Burn renamed to FC Dallas.

=== 2006–07 (6 teams) ===
- Chivas USA
- Colorado Rapids
- FC Dallas
- Houston Dynamo
- Los Angeles Galaxy
- Real Salt Lake

Changes from 2005: The San Jose Earthquakes was put on hiatus; The Houston Dynamo joined the league as an expansion franchise.

=== 2008 (7 teams) ===
- Chivas USA
- Colorado Rapids
- FC Dallas
- Houston Dynamo
- Los Angeles Galaxy
- Real Salt Lake
- San Jose Earthquakes

Changes from 2007: The San Jose Earthquakes return to MLS after its hiatus.

=== 2009–10 (8 teams) ===
- Chivas USA
- Colorado Rapids
- FC Dallas
- Houston Dynamo
- Los Angeles Galaxy
- Real Salt Lake
- San Jose Earthquakes
- Seattle Sounders FC

Changes from 2008: Seattle Sounders FC was added in the 2009 expansion.

=== 2011–14 (9 teams) ===
- Chivas USA
- Colorado Rapids
- FC Dallas
- Los Angeles Galaxy
- Portland Timbers
- Real Salt Lake
- San Jose Earthquakes
- Seattle Sounders FC
- Vancouver Whitecaps FC

Changes from 2010: The Portland Timbers and Vancouver Whitecaps FC were added in the 2011 expansion; Houston Dynamo moved to the Eastern Conference.

=== 2015–16 (10 teams) ===
- Colorado Rapids
- FC Dallas
- Houston Dynamo
- Los Angeles Galaxy
- Portland Timbers
- Real Salt Lake
- San Jose Earthquakes
- Seattle Sounders FC
- Sporting Kansas City
- Vancouver Whitecaps FC

Changes from 2014: Chivas USA ceases operations; Sporting Kansas City and the Houston Dynamo move in from the Eastern Conference.

=== 2017 (11 teams) ===
- Colorado Rapids
- FC Dallas
- Houston Dynamo
- Los Angeles Galaxy
- Minnesota United FC
- Portland Timbers
- Real Salt Lake
- San Jose Earthquakes
- Seattle Sounders FC
- Sporting Kansas City
- Vancouver Whitecaps FC

Changes from 2016: Minnesota United FC was added in the 2017 expansion.

=== 2018–19 (12 teams) ===
- Colorado Rapids
- FC Dallas
- Houston Dynamo
- LA Galaxy
- Los Angeles FC
- Minnesota United FC
- Portland Timbers
- Real Salt Lake
- San Jose Earthquakes
- Seattle Sounders FC
- Sporting Kansas City
- Vancouver Whitecaps FC

Changes from 2017: Los Angeles FC was added in the 2018 expansion.

=== 2020 (12 teams) ===
- Colorado Rapids
- FC Dallas
- Houston Dynamo
- LA Galaxy
- Los Angeles FC
- Minnesota United FC
- Portland Timbers
- Real Salt Lake
- San Jose Earthquakes
- Seattle Sounders FC
- Sporting Kansas City
- Vancouver Whitecaps FC

Changes from 2019: Nashville SC was added in the 2020 expansion, but moved to the Eastern Conference since the MLS is Back Tournament up to the end of the 2020 season.

=== 2021 (13 teams) ===
- Austin FC
- Colorado Rapids
- FC Dallas
- Houston Dynamo FC
- LA Galaxy
- Los Angeles FC
- Minnesota United FC
- Portland Timbers
- Real Salt Lake
- San Jose Earthquakes
- Seattle Sounders FC
- Sporting Kansas City
- Vancouver Whitecaps FC

Changes from 2020: Nashville SC moved to the Eastern Conference; Austin FC was added in the 2021 expansion; Houston Dynamo added "FC" to their name.

=== 2022 (14 teams) ===
- Austin FC
- Colorado Rapids
- FC Dallas
- Houston Dynamo FC
- LA Galaxy
- Los Angeles FC
- Minnesota United FC
- Nashville SC
- Portland Timbers
- Real Salt Lake
- San Jose Earthquakes
- Seattle Sounders FC
- Sporting Kansas City
- Vancouver Whitecaps FC

Change from 2021: Nashville SC moved in from the Eastern Conference.

=== 2023–24 (14 teams) ===
- Austin FC
- Colorado Rapids
- FC Dallas
- Houston Dynamo FC
- LA Galaxy
- Los Angeles FC
- Minnesota United FC
- Portland Timbers
- Real Salt Lake
- San Jose Earthquakes
- Seattle Sounders FC
- Sporting Kansas City
- St. Louis City SC
- Vancouver Whitecaps FC

Changes from 2022: Nashville SC moved back to the Eastern Conference as expansion side St. Louis City SC was added to the Western Conference.

=== 2025–26 (15 teams) ===
- Austin FC
- Colorado Rapids
- FC Dallas
- Houston Dynamo FC
- LA Galaxy
- Los Angeles FC
- Minnesota United FC
- Portland Timbers
- Real Salt Lake
- San Diego FC
- San Jose Earthquakes
- Seattle Sounders FC
- Sporting Kansas City
- St. Louis City SC
- Vancouver Whitecaps FC

Changes from 2024: San Diego FC was added in the 2025 expansion.

== Western Conference playoff champions by year ==
Note: The conference finals were a best-of-three series through 2001 (including the MLS semifinals in 2000 and 2001, when a conference playoff format was not used). Matches tied after regulation were decided by a shoot-out. In 2002, a similar format was used except that draws were allowed and the team earning the most points advanced. From 2003 through 2011, the Finals were a single match. Matches tied after regulation went to extra time (Golden goal extra time was implemented for 2003 only), then a shoot-out if necessary. Beginning in 2012, the finals were a two-match aggregate series. The away goals rule for series that finished even on aggregate was first implemented in 2014. Extra time and shoot-outs were used if necessary, although away goals did not apply in extra time. In 2019, the playoffs returned to a single match, single elimination format (including the conference finals), which were hosted by the higher placed team in the regular season.

From 2015 to 2021, the Western Conference was represented in the MLS Cup by either Seattle Sounders FC or the Portland Timbers.

**Bold**	MLS Cup champions

Season	Champions	Score	Runners-up
1996	LA Galaxy	2 matches to 0	Kansas City Wizards
1997	Colorado Rapids	2 matches to 0	Dallas Burn
1998	**Chicago Fire**	2 matches to 0	LA Galaxy
1999	LA Galaxy	2 matches to 1	Dallas Burn
2000	No conference playoffs		
2001	No conference playoffs		
2002	No conference playoffs		
2003	**San Jose Earthquakes**	3–2 (a.e.t.)	Kansas City Wizards
2004	Kansas City Wizards	2–0	LA Galaxy
2005	**LA Galaxy**	2–0	Colorado Rapids
2006	**Houston Dynamo**	3–1	Colorado Rapids
2007	**Houston Dynamo**	2–0	Kansas City Wizards
2008	New York Red Bulls^{E}	1–0	Real Salt Lake
2009	LA Galaxy	2–0 (a.e.t.)	Houston Dynamo
2010	FC Dallas	3–0	LA Galaxy
2011	**LA Galaxy**	3–1	Real Salt Lake
2012	**LA Galaxy**	4–2 agg.	Seattle Sounders FC
2013	Real Salt Lake	5–2 agg.	Portland Timbers
2014	**LA Galaxy**	2–2 agg. (a)	Seattle Sounders FC
2015	**Portland Timbers**	5–3 agg.	FC Dallas
2016	**Seattle Sounders FC**	3–1 agg.	Colorado Rapids
2017	Seattle Sounders FC	5–0 agg.	Houston Dynamo
2018	Portland Timbers	3–2 agg.	Sporting Kansas City
2019	**Seattle Sounders FC**	3–1	Los Angeles FC
2020	Seattle Sounders FC	3–2	Minnesota United FC
2021	Portland Timbers	2–0	Real Salt Lake
2022	**Los Angeles FC**	3–0	Austin FC
2023	Los Angeles FC	2–0	Houston Dynamo FC
2024	**LA Galaxy**	1–0	Seattle Sounders FC
2025	Vancouver Whitecaps FC	3–1	San Diego FC

^{E} – Eastern Conference team.

=== Western Conference Champion counts by team ===
As of the 2025 season, a total of sixteen different teams have competed in the Western Conference finals, and thirteen of those teams have won at least once. In the table below, teams are ordered first by the number of appearances in a Western Conference finals, then by the number of wins, and finally by year. Note that this table does not include years that a Western Conference team appeared in the Eastern Conference in the playoffs (such as 2010), and it does include appearances by Eastern Conference teams. Chivas USA (defunct), Nashville SC, and St. Louis City SC and have never made it to the Western Conference finals.

Club	Appearances	Wins	Losses	Most recent Year of Appearance
LA Galaxy	11	8	3	2024
Seattle Sounders FC	7	4	3	2024
Houston Dynamo FC	5	2	3	2023
Sporting Kansas City	5	1	4	2007
Colorado Rapids	4	1	3	2016
FC Dallas	4	1	3	2015
Real Salt Lake	4	1	3	2013
Portland Timbers	4	3	1	2021
New York Red Bulls (Eastern Conference team)	1	1	0	2008
San Jose Earthquakes	1	1	0	2003
Chicago Fire FC (now in Eastern Conference)	1	1	0	1998
Vancouver Whitecaps FC	1	1	0	2025
Minnesota United FC	1	0	1	2020
Los Angeles FC	3	2	1	2023
Austin FC	1	0	1	2022
San Diego FC	1	0	1	2025

== Western Conference regular season champions by year ==
Since 2013, the winner of each conference has qualified for the CONCACAF Champions Cup.

**Bold**	Supporters' Shield champions

Year	Team	Record (W–L–T) (GD)	Playoffs result
1996	LA Galaxy	19–13–0^ (+10)	Lost MLS Cup
1997	Kansas City Wizards	21–11–0^ (+6)	Lost conference semifinals
1998	**LA Galaxy**	24–8–0^ (+41)	Lost conference finals
1999	LA Galaxy	20–12–0^ (+20)	Lost MLS Cup
2000	**Kansas City Wizards**	16–7–9 (+18)	**Won** MLS Cup
2001	LA Galaxy†	14–7–5 (+16)	Lost Semifinals
2002	**LA Galaxy**	16–9–3 (+11)	**Won** MLS Cup
2003	San Jose Earthquakes	14–7–9 (+10)	**Won** MLS Cup
2004	Kansas City Wizards	14–9–7 (+8)	Lost MLS Cup
2005	**San Jose Earthquakes**	18–4–10 (+22)	Lost conference semifinals
2006	FC Dallas	16–12–4 (+4)	Lost conference semifinals
2007	Chivas USA	15–7–8 (+18)	Lost conference semifinals
2008	Houston Dynamo	13–5–12 (+13)	Lost conference semifinals
2009	LA Galaxy	12–6–12 (+5)	Lost MLS Cup
2010	**LA Galaxy**	18–7–5 (+18)	Lost conference finals
2011	**LA Galaxy**	19–5–10 (+20)	**Won** MLS Cup
2012	**San Jose Earthquakes**	19–6–9 (+29)	Lost conference semifinals
2013	Portland Timbers	14–5–15 (+21)	Lost conference finals
2014	**Seattle Sounders FC**	20–10–4 (+15)	Lost conference finals
2015	FC Dallas	18–10–6 (+13)	Lost conference finals
2016	**FC Dallas**	17–8–9 (+10)	Lost conference semifinals
2017	Portland Timbers	15–11–8 (+10)	Lost conference semifinals
2018	Sporting Kansas City	18–8–8 (+25)	Lost conference finals
2019	**Los Angeles FC**	21–4–9 (+48)	Lost conference finals
2020	Sporting Kansas City	12–6–3 (+13)	Lost conference semifinals
2021	Colorado Rapids	17–7–10 (+16)	Lost conference semifinals
2022	**Los Angeles FC**	21–9–4 (+28)	**Won** MLS Cup
2023	St. Louis City SC	17–12–5 (+17)	Lost first round
2024	Los Angeles FC	19–7–8 (+20)	Lost conference semifinals
2025	San Diego FC	19–9–6 (+23)	Lost conference finals
2026	Vancouver Whitecaps FC	19–8–7 (+40)	TBD

^ – MLS did not have draws until the 2000 season.
† – The LA Galaxy were declared winners of the Western Division in 2001 after the September 11, 2001 terrorist attacks forced the cancellation of the rest of the regular season. The MLS Cup playoffs began on September 20.

== MLS West at the MLS All-Star Game ==
In 1996, 1997, 1999, 2000, 2001, and 2004, the Major League Soccer All-Star Game was contested between an all-star team from the Western Conference against an all-star team from the Eastern Conference. In total, the MLS West all-star team has 1 win, 1 draw, and 4 losses against the east.

Yearly results
Year	Result	Score	Series
1996	Lost	2–3	East 1–0–0
1997	Lost	4–5	East 2–0–0
1999	Won	6–4	East 2–1–0
2000	Lost	4–9	East 3–1–0
2001	Tied	6–6	East 3–1–1
2004	Lost	2–3	East 4–1–1

== See also ==
- Eastern Conference (MLS)
- Central Division (MLS)
