= Phoenix MLS stadium =

Proposed sports stadium

Coordinates: 33.4391°N 111.9061°W

- Rendering of the proposed stadium
- Interactive map of Phoenix MLS stadium
- Location: Tempe, Arizona
- Owner: Phoenix Rising FC
- Operator: Phoenix Rising FC
- Capacity: 21,000
- Surface: Grass

Tenant
- Phoenix Rising FC (MLS)

The Phoenix MLS stadium is a proposed 21,000 seat soccer-specific stadium to be built in Tempe, Arizona for the Phoenix Rising FC, in its effort to join Major League Soccer.

In May 2017, Phoenix Rising signed an agreement with Goldman Sachs to help funding of a new stadium on land purchased from the Salt River Pima-Maricopa Indian Community if selected.
