= Major League Soccer defunct clubs =

Since its creation in 1996, Major League Soccer, the highest level of professional soccer in the United States, has had three clubs cease operations—the Tampa Bay Mutiny, the Miami Fusion, and Chivas USA. The two Florida-based clubs ceased playing after the 2001 season as a result of the league's financial situation, and Chivas USA folded after the 2014 season with plans to rebrand and move to a stadium in downtown Los Angeles. All three situations involved league ownership of the clubs and executive decisions to maintain the viability and competitiveness of the league.

== Defunct clubs ==
Defunct clubs
Club	City	Stadium	Years active	Reason for disbandment
Chivas USA	Carson, California	StubHub Center	2005–2014	Rebrand and stadium move
Miami Fusion	Fort Lauderdale, Florida	Lockhart Stadium	1998–2001	League financial situation
Tampa Bay Mutiny	Tampa, Florida	Tampa Stadium (1996–1998); Raymond James Stadium (1999–2001)	1996–2001	League financial situation

=== Tampa Bay Mutiny (1996–2001) ===
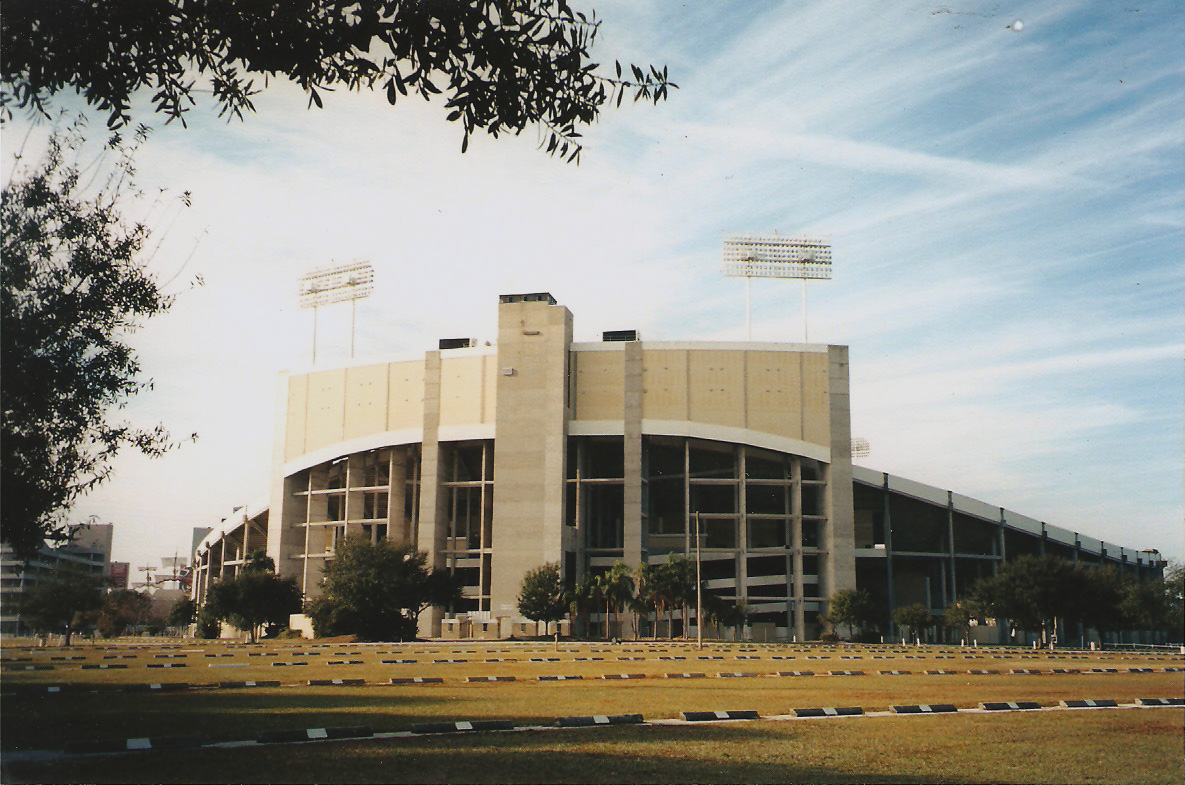
The Tampa Bay Mutiny played out of Tampa Stadium from 1996 to 1998, before it was demolished in 1999.

Tampa Bay Mutiny entered the league in 1996 as one of Major League Soccer's inaugural clubs. They won the first ever Supporter's Shield that year as the club with the best regular season record. In 1999, Tampa Stadium was demolished which forced the club to move to the newly built Raymond James Stadium. With this move came an unfavorable lease agreement, which funneled almost all the Mutiny's matchday revenue to the Buccaneers. Furthermore, the Mutiny was hampered by poor results on the field, failing to make it past the first round of the playoffs in both 1999 and 2000. In 2001, the Mutiny won just four games, drawing two, and losing 21. This caused a significant decrease in attendance, which averaged below 11,000 per game in the 2001 season.

Throughout the entire course of its existence, the Mutiny was owned by Major League Soccer. Since 1996, the league had reportedly posted losses of $250 million. MLS approached Malcolm Glazer to buy the club, which he ultimately declined. On January 8, 2002, MLS announced that they would be removing Tampa Bay Mutiny from the league because they never found local ownership and declining attendance combined with the unfavorable stadium lease failed to generate meaningful revenue for the league. Along with fellow Florida club Miami Fusion, the Mutiny ceased operations in early 2002. A dispersal draft for both clubs occurred in January 2002.

The Mutiny is the only MLS club ever to have been owned by the league throughout its entire history.

=== Miami Fusion (1998–2001) ===
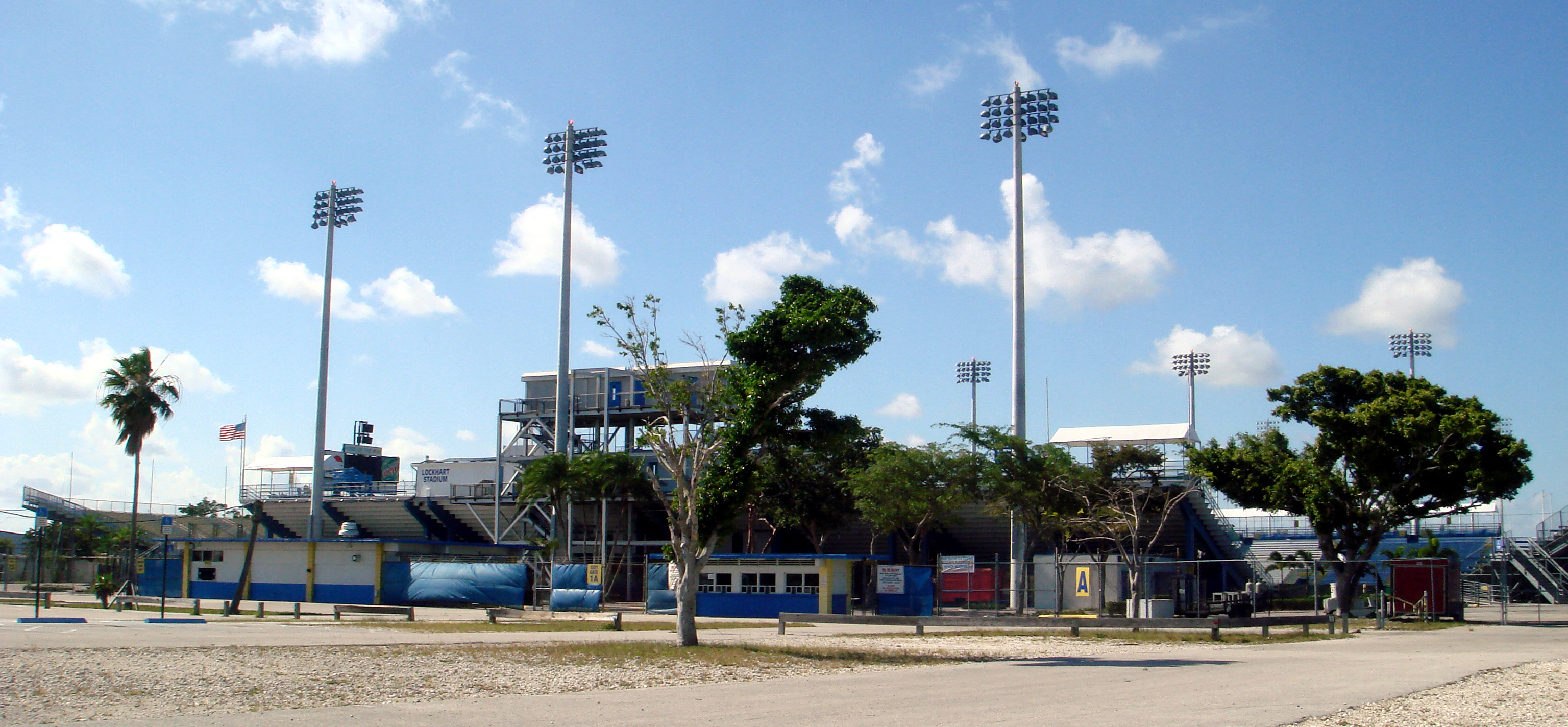
Playing out of Lockhart Stadium in Fort Lauderdale, Miami Fusion existed for just four seasons.

Miami Fusion entered the league in 1998, qualifying for the playoffs in each of their opening two seasons. However, they had losing records in each of their first three seasons. In 2001, head coach Ray Hudson led the Fusion to their best ever season, winning the Supporters' Shield with a record of 16–5–5. In the playoffs, the club would dispatch the defending champion Kansas City Wizards in three games. In the next round, the Fusion were eliminated by the San Jose Earthquakes after Troy Dayak scored in overtime in the series tiebreaker.

Despite this success, the Fusion still had the league's lowest season ticket sales and the lowest revenue from sponsors. Owner Ken Horowitz supported the imposition of measures to keep spending down for MLS clubs, as it was reported that the Fusion's ownership had lost $15 million in operating costs since joining the league. On January 8, 2002, MLS commissioner Don Garber announced that the Fusion and the Tampa Bay Mutiny would be expelled from the league and subsequently disbanded. Although the Fusion had their own lease on a 20,000-seat stadium, Garber cited low revenue and lack of corporate sponsorship as the reason for the decision. It was also reported that Horowitz had asked the MLS to pay some of the club's expenses, and this threatened the financial viability of the league, which had reportedly lost $250 million during its first five years. Horowitz also stated that Miami was not a feasible location for the Fusion because many residents did not identify with local sports teams. By the end of January 2002, MLS had contracted Miami Fusion and the club had ceased operations. A dispersal draft for the Fusion and Tampa Bay Mutiny occurred in January 2002.

MLS would return to the Miami market in 2020 in the form of Inter Miami CF playing on the Lockhart site at Chase Stadium.

=== Chivas USA (2005–2014) ===
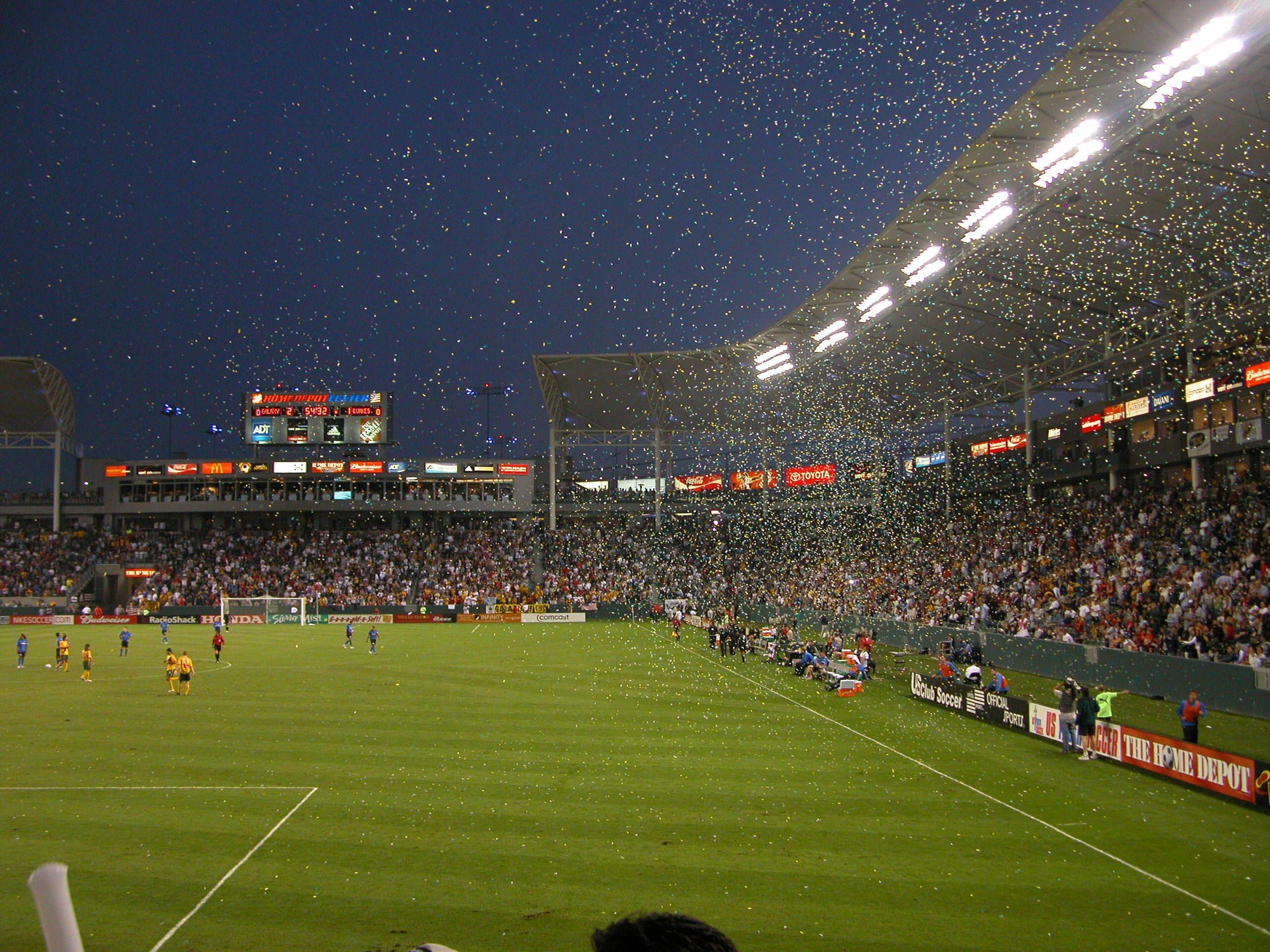
Inside the Home Depot Center, shared by LA Galaxy and Chivas USA until Chivas' contraction in 2014.

Despite initial success, Chivas USA faced challenges both on and off the field in the early 2010s. Consistent poor form led to the removal of four managers between 2010 and 2013. In addition, the club faced a discrimination lawsuit, administrative departures, and declining attendance. On February 20, 2014, Major League Soccer purchased Chivas USA from Jorge Vergara, the owner of Chivas since the club's inaugural season. They announced plans to sell to a buyer dedicated to keeping the club in Los Angeles, as well as a plan to rebrand the club in time for the 2015 MLS season. ESPN reported on September 29, 2014, that the club would suspend operations at the end of the MLS regular season, according to multiple sources.

On September 30, 2014, Grant Wahl of Sports Illustrated reported that a group of investors headed by Henry Nguyen, Los Angeles Dodgers investor Peter Guber, and Cardiff City owner Vincent Tan agreed to purchase the club for a fee over $100 million. The sale meant that Chivas USA would fold, on the condition that a new Los Angeles team would take the field as an expansion team in 2017 with a new stadium in Downtown Los Angeles.

Chivas USA ceased operations on October 27, 2014, with its player development academy continuing to be operated by MLS until June 2015. A dispersal draft took place after the 2014 season, having the remaining players from the club dispersed to other clubs in the league.

== Impact on Major League Soccer ==
Initially, MLS struggled to generate enough revenue to be profitable. The decision to expel Miami Fusion and Tampa Bay Mutiny was designed to cut costs, by reducing the league from 12 clubs to 10. Once the Florida clubs went defunct in 2002, it was taken as a sign that Major League Soccer was struggling, especially because of its inability to find ownership for its clubs. At that point, there were only three owners in the entire league. League commissioner Don Garber stated "I know many out there think this is the end of Major League Soccer, and that couldn't be further from the truth. We simply could not find a solution that was economically feasible at this time, and we hope to return to the state of Florida when the league expands in future years." However, despite a lack of confidence in the league, the cost-cutting measures were effective and the league eventually began to attract more local ownership groups. In 2015, Orlando City SC brought MLS back to Florida, followed in 2020 by Inter Miami CF.

After the folding of Chivas USA, its successor, Los Angeles FC, was expected to begin play in 2017, pending the construction of its own stadium (Chivas USA shared a stadium with the Los Angeles Galaxy throughout its existence). Due to the site chosen for the Los Angeles stadium, it was announced that the new team would push back its first season until 2018.

== See also ==
- History of soccer in the United States
- Expansion of Major League Soccer
