= Central Division (MLS) =

- League: Major League Soccer
- Sport: Soccer
- Founded: 2000
- Folded: 2001
- No. of teams: 4
- Last champion: Chicago Fire
- Most titles: Chicago Fire (2)

The MLS Central Division was one of Major League Soccer's three divisions, existing in 2000 and 2001.

== Division lineups ==
=== 2000–2001 ===
Locations of Central Division teams

==== Lineup for 2000–2001 ====
- Chicago Fire
- Columbus Crew
- Dallas Burn
- Tampa Bay Mutiny

==== Changes from 1999 ====
- The new Central Division is created
- The Chicago Fire and Dallas Burn move in from the Western Conference (which became the Western Division)
- The Columbus Crew and Tampa Bay Mutiny move in from the Eastern Conference (which became the Eastern Division)

=== After the 2001 season ===
- The Miami Fusion and Tampa Bay Mutiny were contracted, resulting in the disbanding of the Central Division
- The Chicago Fire and Columbus Crew move to the Eastern Division (now renamed Eastern Conference)
- The Dallas Burn move to the Western Division (now renamed Western Conference)

== Central Division champions by year ==
- 2000: Chicago Fire
- 2001: Chicago Fire†

† – The Chicago Fire were declared winners of the Central Division in 2001 after the September 11 attacks caused the cancellation of the rest of the regular season. The MLS Cup Playoffs began on September 20.

== See also ==
- Eastern Conference (MLS)
- Western Conference (MLS)
