= Aziza =

Aziza or Azizah may refer to:

== Given name ==
=== Aziza ===
- Aziza Abdel-Halim, chairwoman of the Muslim Women's National Network Australia
- Aziza Barnes (1992–2024), American poet, screenwriter, and playwright
- Aziza Baroud (1965–2025), Chadian politician and diplomat
- Aziza Brahim (born 1976), Sahrawi singer
- Aziza Jafarzadeh (1921–2003), Azerbaijani writer
- Aziza Mint Jiddou, Mauritanian politician
- Aziza Mustafa Zadeh (born 1969), Azerbaijani musician
- Azize Tanrıkulu (born 1986), Turkish martial artist
- Aziza Abdelfattah (born 1990), Egyptian synchronized swimmer
- Aziza Sleyum Ally, Member of Parliament in the National Assembly of Tanzania
- Aziza Ali, Singaporean former chef, food consultant, businessperson, artist, jeweller, and author
- Aziza Hussein, Paralympian athlete from Egypt
- Aziza Sbaity (born 1991), Lebanese sprinter
- Aziza (born 1964), Uzbek–Russian singer-songwriter.

=== Azizah ===
- Azizah Y. al-Hibri, American philosopher and academic
- Azizah Mohd Dun (born 1960), Sabah's State Minister for Community Development and Consumer Affairs
- Azizah Abd Allah Abu Lahum (born 1945), Yemeni novelist and writer
- Tunku Azizah Aminah Maimunah (born 1960), current Queen Consort of Malaysia
- Wan Azizah Wan Ismail (born 1952), Malaysian politician

== Other ==
- Aziza (African mythology), African legendary creature
- Aziza (Quest for Glory), a character in the Quest for Glory video game series
- "L'Aziza", a 1985 Daniel Balavoine song
- Aziza (album), a 2016 album by bassist Dave Holland
- Aziza (1980 film), a Tunisian and Algerian drama film
- Aziza (2019 film), a short film directed by Soudade Kaadan
- Azizah, an American magazine

== See also ==
- Aziz (equivalent masculine name)
- Ariza (disambiguation)
