= Ariza =

Ariza is a Spanish language name. It may refer to:

== Places ==
=== Spain ===
- Ariza, Zaragoza, municipality in the province of Zaragoza, Aragon, Spain
- Alconchel de Ariza
- Embid de Ariza
- Monreal de Ariza
- Pozuel de Ariza

== People ==
- Ariza (surname), includes list of people with the name
- Ariza Makukula (born 1981), Portuguese footballer

== Nature ==
- Bangana ariza, or Reba, a species of cyprinid fish found in India, Nepal, Bangladesh and Pakistan
- Tillandsia ariza-juliae, a species of flower

== Medicine ==
- Ariza, a former proposed brand name for the drug gepirone
