= Ariza (surname) =

Ariza is a surname. Notable people with the name include:

- Amilkar Ariza (born 1943), Colombian painter and sculptor
- Juan Ariza (1816–1876), Spanish novelist, poet, and playwright
- Juan Esteban Ariza Mendoza (1928–2006), Dominican lawyer, diplomat, and poet
- Julio Ariza (born 1957), Spanish entrepreneur
- Mayerli Buitrago Ariza (born 1986), Colombian shot putter
- Natalia Ariza (born 1991), Colombian footballer
- Óscar Ariza (born 1999), Venezuelan diver
- Patricia Ariza (born 1948), Colombian poet, playwright, and actor
- René Ariza (1940–1994), Cuban actor, director, and playwright
- Tatiana Ariza (born 1991), Colombian footballer
- Trevor Ariza (born 1985), American basketball player

== See also ==
- Araiza, surname
