= Carlos Valderrama =

Colombian footballer (born 1961)

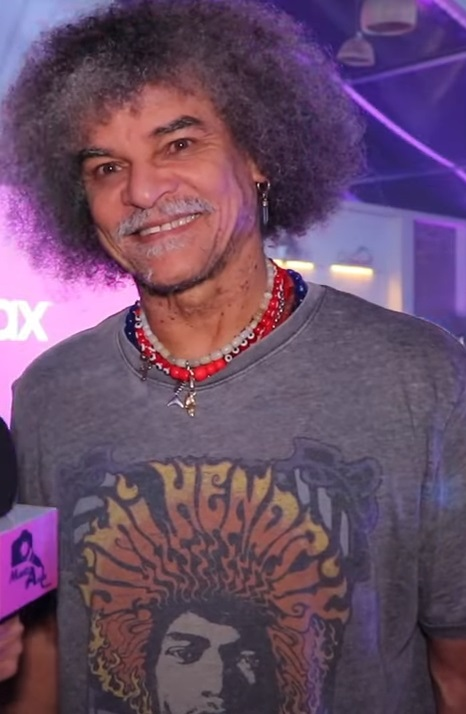
- Valderrama in 2022

Personal information
- Full name: Carlos Alberto Valderrama Palacio
- Date of birth: 2 September 1961 (age 65)
- Place of birth: Santa Marta, Colombia
- Height: 1.75 m (5 ft 9 in)
- Position: Attacking midfielder

Youth career
- Liceo Celedón
- Unión Magdalena

Senior career*
| Years | Team | Apps | (Gls) |
| 1980–1984 | Unión Magdalena | 94 | (5) |
| 1984–1985 | Millonarios | 33 | (0) |
| 1985–1987 | Deportivo Cali | 131 | (22) |
| 1987–1991 | Montpellier | 77 | (4) |
| 1991–1992 | Real Valladolid | 17 | (1) |
| 1992–1993 | Independiente Medellín | 10 | (1) |
| 1993–1995 | Atlético Junior | 82 | (5) |
| 1995–1997 | Tampa Bay Mutiny | 43 | (7) |
| 1996–1997 | → Deportivo Cali (loan) | 18 | (4) |
| 1997–1999 | Miami Fusion | 22 | (3) |
| 2000–2001 | Tampa Bay Mutiny | 71 | (5) |
| 2001–2002 | Colorado Rapids | 39 | (1) |
| Total | | 637 | (58) |

International career
| 1985–1998 | Colombia | 111 | (11) |

Managerial career
- 2007: Atlético Junior (assistant)
Medal record
Representing Colombia
Copa América
| Third place | 1987 Argentina |
| Third place | 1993 Ecuador |
| Third place | 1995 Uruguay |
- * Club domestic league appearances and goals

Carlos Alberto Valderrama Palacio (Colombian Spanish: [ˈkaɾlos alˈβeɾto βaldeˈrama paˈlasjo]; born 2 September 1961), also known as "El Pibe" ("The Kid"), is a Colombian former professional footballer and commentator for Fútbol de Primera. An attacking midfielder, Valderrama is considered by many to be one of the greatest South American players in history and was named by Pelé in the FIFA 100 list of the world's greatest living players.

A creative playmaker, he is regarded as one of the best Colombian footballers of all time, and by some, as Colombia's greatest player ever. His distinctive hairstyle, as well as his precise passing and technical skills made him one of South America's most recognisable footballers in the late 1980s and early 1990s. He won the South American Footballer of the Year award in 1987 and 1993, He is the fifth highest assister in the history of national teams and the twelfth overall, including clubs, and in 1999, he was also named one of the top 100 players of the 20th century by World Soccer.

Valderrama was a member of the Colombia national team from 1985 until 1998, representing his country in 111 full internationals and scoring 11 times. This makes him the fourth-most capped player in the national team's history, behind James Rodríguez, David Ospina and Juan Cuadrado. He played a major role during the golden era of Colombian football in the 1990s, representing his national side in three FIFA World Cups and five Copa América tournaments.

After spending most of his career playing club football in South America and Europe, towards the end of his career Valderrama played in Major League Soccer, joining the league in its first season. One of the most recognisable players in the league at the time of its inception, he helped popularise the league during the second half of the 1990s. He remained an icon, and is one of the most decorated MLS players; in 2005, he was named to the MLS All-Time Best XI.

== Club career ==
=== Colombia and Europe ===
Born on 2 September 1961 in Santa Marta, Colombia, Valderrama began his career at Unión Magdalena of the Colombian First Division in 1981. He also later played for Millonarios in 1984. He joined Deportivo Cali in 1985, where he played most of his Colombian football. In 1988, he moved to the French First Division side Montpellier. He struggled to adapt to the less technical and the faster, more physical, and tactical brand of football being played in Europe, losing his place in the squad. However, his passing ability later saw him become the club's main creative force, and he played a decisive role as his side won the Coupe de France in 1990. In 1991, he remained in Europe and joined Spanish side Real Valladolid for a season. He then returned to Colombia in 1992 and went on to play for Independiente Medellín, and subsequently Atlético Junior in 1993, with whom he won the Colombian championship in 1993 and 1995.

=== MLS career ===
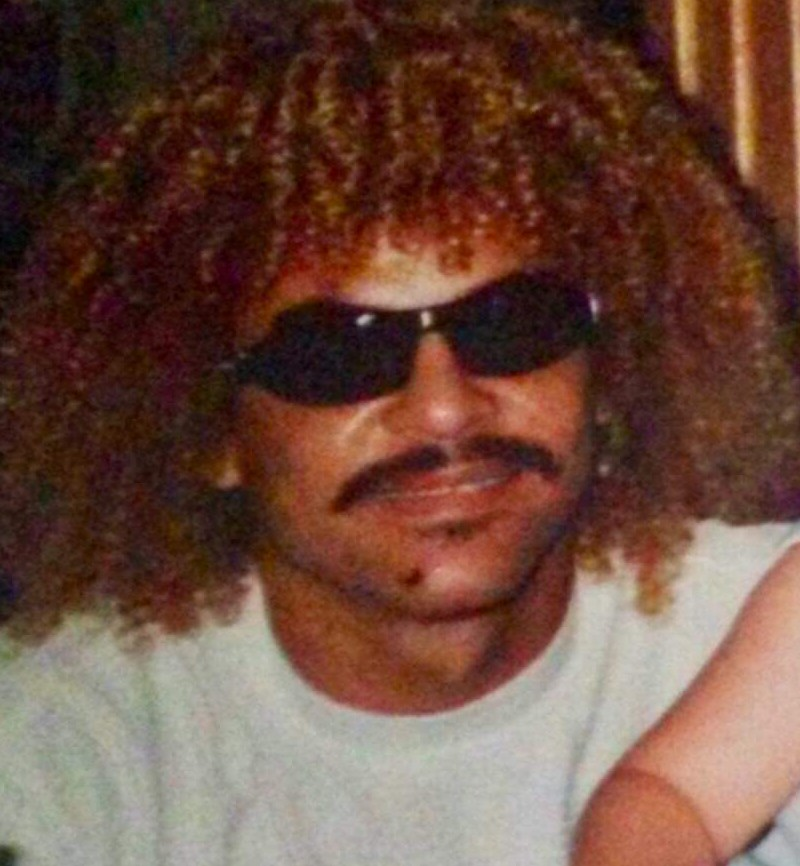
Valderrama at a Tampa Bay Mutiny fan meet in 1998

Valderrama began his Major League Soccer career with the US side Tampa Bay Mutiny in the league's inaugural 1996 season. The team won the first ever Supporters' Shield, awarded for having the league's best regular season record, while Valderrama was the league's first Most Valuable Player, finishing the season with 4 goals and 17 assists. He remained with the club for the 1997 season, and also spent a spell on loan back at Deportivo Cali in Colombia, before moving to another MLS side, Miami Fusion, in 1998, where he also remained for two seasons. He returned to Tampa Bay in 2000, spending two more seasons with the club; while a member of the Mutiny, the team would sell Carlos Valderrama wigs at Tampa Stadium. In the 2000 MLS season, the 38-year-old Valderrama recorded the only 20+ assist season in MLS history—ending the season with 26 — a single season assist record that remains intact to this day, and which MLS itself suggested was an "unbreakable" record in a 2012 article.

In 2001, Valderrama joined the Colorado Rapids, and remained with the team until 2002, when he retired. He played his last career match in a 1–1 draw with the Kansas City Wizards on 20 September 2002, with Valderrama assisting Mark Chung's goal, and in doing so at the age of 41 years and 18 days, he became the oldest player in the league's history at the time, a record that has since been surpassed by four other players, including three goalkeepers. His American soccer league career spanned a total of eight years, during which he made 175 appearances. In the MLS, Valderrama scored relatively few goals (16) for a midfielder, but is the league's fourth all-time leader in assists (114) after Brad Davis (123), Steve Ralston (135) – a former teammate, and Landon Donovan (145). In 2005, he was named to the MLS All-Time Best XI.

== International career ==
Valderrama was a member of the Colombia national football team from 1985 until 1998; he made 111 international appearances, scoring 11 goals, making him the third-most capped outfield player in the country's history. He represented and captained his national side in the 1990, 1994, and 1998 FIFA World Cups, and also took part in the 1987, 1989, 1991, 1993, and 1995 Copa América tournaments.

Valderrama made his international debut on 27 October 1985, in a 3–0 defeat to Paraguay in a 1986 World Cup qualifying match, at the age of 24. In his first major international tournament, he helped Colombia to a third-place finish at the 1987 Copa América in Argentina, as his team's captain, where he was named the tournament's best player; during the tournament, he scored the opening goal in Colombia's 2–0 over Bolivia on 1 July, their first match of the group stage.

Some of Valderrama's most impressive international performances came during the 1990 FIFA World Cup in Italy, during which he served as Colombia's captain. He helped his team to a 2–0 win against the UAE in Colombia's opening match of the group stage, scoring the second goal of the match with a strike from 20 yards. Colombia lost their second match against Yugoslavia, however, needing at least a draw against the eventual champions West Germany in their final group match in order to advance to the next round of the competition. In the decisive game, German striker Pierre Littbarski scored what appeared to be the winning goal in the 88th minute of the game; however, within the last minute of injury time, Valderrama beat several opposing players and made a crucial left-footed pass to Freddy Rincón, who subsequently equalised, sealing a place for Colombia in the second round of the tournament with a 1–1 draw. Colombia were eliminated in the round of 16, following a 2–1 extra time loss to Cameroon.

On 5 September 1993, Valderrama contributed to Colombia's historic 5–0 victory over South American rivals Argentina at the Monumental in Buenos Aires, which allowed them to qualify for the 1994 World Cup. Although much was expected of Valderrama at the World Cup, an injury during a pre-tournament warm-up game put his place in the squad in jeopardy; although he was able to regain match fitness in time for the tournament, Colombia disappointed and suffered a first-round elimination following defeats to Romania and the hosts USA. However, it is widely believed that internal problems and threats by drug cartel groups at the time contributed to the team's underwhelming results in the competition, in particular following the murder of Andrés Escobar after Colombia's 2–1 defeat to the host nation in the second group match; during the match, the Colombian defender had netted an own goal to open the scoring, which ultimately proved to be decisive, despite a 2–0 win over Switzerland in the final first round fixture.

Four years later, Valderrama led his nation to qualify for the 1998 World Cup in France, scoring three goals during the qualifying stages. His impact in the final tournament at the advancing age of 37, however, was less decisive, and, despite defeating Tunisia, Colombia once again suffered a first round exit, following a 2–0 defeat against England, which was Valderrama's final international appearance.

== Playing style ==
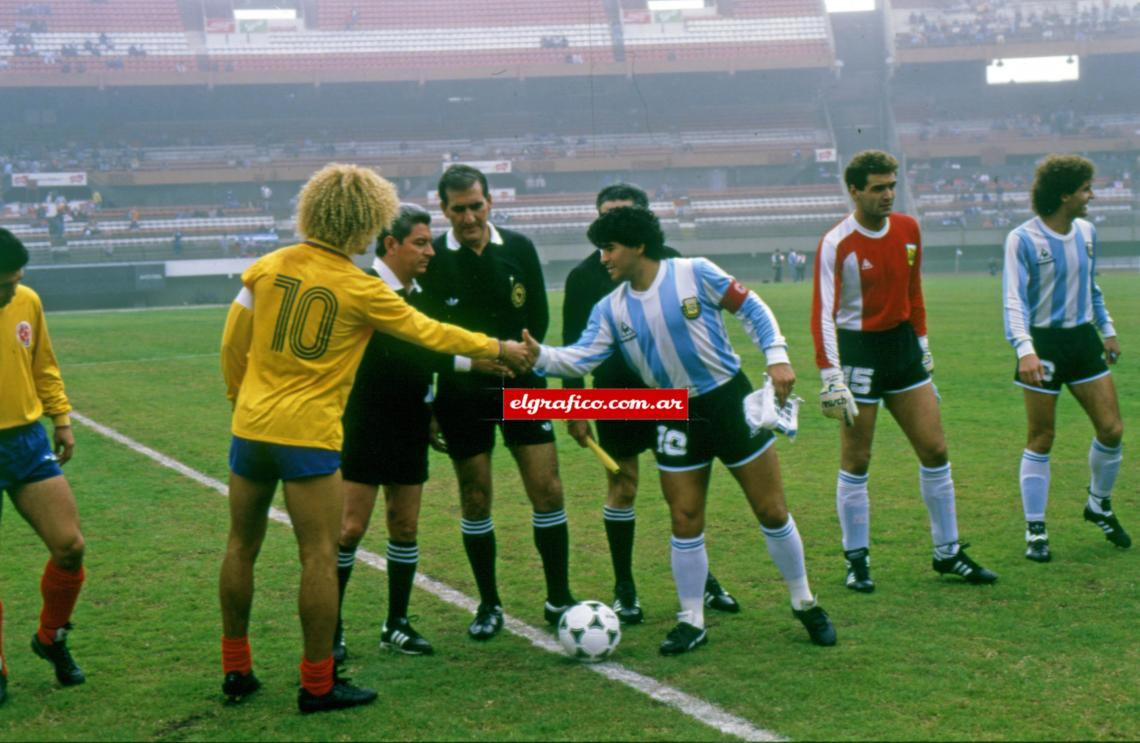
Valderrama greeting Diego Maradona in the 1987 Copa América

Although Valderrama is often defined as a 'classic number 10 playmaker', due to his creativity and offensive contribution, in reality he was not a classic playmaker in the traditional sense. Although he often wore the number 10 shirt throughout his career and was deployed as an attacking midfielder at times, he played mostly in deeper positions in the centre of the pitch – often operating in a free role as a deep-lying playmaker, rather than in more advanced midfield positions behind the forwards – in order to have a greater influence on the game. A team-player, Valderrama was also known to be an extremely selfless midfielder, who preferred assisting his teammates over going for goal himself; his tactical intelligence, positioning, reading of the game, efficient movement, and versatile range of passing enabled him to find space for himself to distribute and receive the ball, which allowed him both to set the tempo of his team in midfield with short, first time exchanges, or create chances with long lobbed passes or through balls.

Valderrama's most instantly recognisable physical features were his big afro-blonde hairstyle, jewelry, and moustache, but he was best known for his grace and elegance on the ball, as well as his agility, and quick feet as a footballer. His control, dribbling ability and footwork were similar to those of smaller players, which for a player of Valderrama's size and physical build was fairly uncommon, and he frequently stood out throughout his career for his ability to use his strength, balance, composure, and flamboyant technique to shield the ball from opponents when put under pressure, and retain possession in difficult situations, often with elaborate skills, which made him an extremely popular figure with the fans. Valderrama's mix of physical strength, two-footed ability, unpredictability and flair enabled him to produce key and incisive performances against top-tier teams, while his world class vision and exceptional passing and crossing ability with his right foot made him one of the best assist providers of his time; his height, physique and elevation also made him effective in the air, and he was also an accurate free kick taker and striker of the ball, despite not being a particularly prolific goalscorer.

Despite his natural talent and ability as a footballer, Valderrama earned a reputation for having a "languid" playing style, as well as lacking notable pace, being unfit, and for having a poor defensive work-rate on the pitch, in particular, after succumbing to the physical effects of ageing in his later career in the MLS. In his first season in France, he also initially struggled to adapt to the faster-paced, more physical, and tactically rigorous European brand of football, which saw him play in an unfamiliar position, and gave him less space and time on the ball to dictate attacking passing moves; he was criticised at times for his lack of match fitness and his low defensive contribution, which initially limited his appearances with the club, although he later successfully became a key creative player in his team's starting line-up due to his discipline, skill, and his precise and efficient passing. Despite these claims, earlier in his career, however, Valderrama demonstrated substantial pace, stamina, and defensive competence.

Former French defender Laurent Blanc, who played with Valderrama in Montpellier, described him thusly: "In the fast and furious European game he wasn't always at his ease. He was a natural exponent of 'toque', keeping the ball moving. But he was so gifted that we could give him the ball when we didn't know what else to do with it knowing he wouldn't lose it ... and often he would do things that most of us only dream about."

== Retirement and legacy ==
In February 2004, Valderrama ended his 22-year career in a tribute match at the Metropolitan stadium of Barranquilla, with some of the most important football players of South America, such as Diego Maradona, Enzo Francescoli, Iván Zamorano, and José Luis Chilavert.

In 2006, a 22-foot bronze statue of Valderrama, created by Colombian artist Amilkar Ariza, was erected outside Estadio Eduardo Santos in Valderrama's birthplace of Santa Marta.

Valderrama was the only Colombian to be featured by Pelé in FIFA's 125 Top Living Football Players list in March 2004.

=== Media ===
Valderrama appeared on the cover of Konami's International Superstar Soccer Pro 98. In the Nintendo 64 version of the game, he is referred to by his nickname, El Pibe.

Valderrama is one of the featured professional Soccer players in Backyard Soccer MLS Edition.

Valderrama has also appeared in EA Sports' FIFA football video game series; he was named one of the Ultimate Team Legend cards in FIFA 15.

Besides his link to videogames, Valderrama has been present in sports media through his work with Fútbol de Primera, Andrés Cantor's radio station. He works as a color commentator during broadcasts of different matches, mostly participating during the FIFA World Cup, alongside play-by-play commentators like Sammy Sadovnik or Cantor himself.

== Coaching career ==
Since retiring from professional football, Valderrama has become assistant manager of Atlético Junior. On 1 November 2007, Valderrama accused a referee of corruption by waving cash in the face of Oscar Julian Ruiz when the official awarded a penalty to América de Cali. Junior lost the match 4–1, which ended the club's hopes of playoff qualification. He later also served as a coach for a football academy called Clearwater Galactics in Clearwater, Florida.

In July 2013, Valderrama was named in charge of Colombia's indigenous peoples' squad, and included his former international teammate Faustino Asprilla in his coaching team. The team finished as runners-up at the 2015 Copa Americana de Pueblos Indígenas in Chile; Valderrama recommended young Wayuu player Luis Díaz to Atlético Junior, and Díaz later became a full international.

== Personal life ==
Valderrama married Claribeth Galván, a woman from La Guajira, with whom he had three sons. From his second marriage, with Elvira Redondo, he has twin daughters. He is also the father of Carlos Alberto, an illegitimate child whom he acknowledged in a lawsuit, who was playing in Santa Fe's under-20 squad in 2011.

== Career statistics ==
=== Club ===
Appearances and goals by club, season and competition
| Club | Season | League | | | Cup | | Continental | | Other | | Total | |
| Club | Season | Division | Apps | Goals | Apps | Goals | Apps | Goals | Apps | Goals | Apps | Goals |
|---|---|---|---|---|---|---|---|---|---|---|---|---|
| Unión Magdalena | 1981 | Categoría Primera A | 15 | 1 | 1 | 0 | – | | – | | 16 | 1 |
| Unión Magdalena | 1982 | Categoría Primera A | 43 | 2 | – | | – | | – | | 43 | 2 |
| Unión Magdalena | 1983 | Categoría Primera A | 36 | 2 | – | | – | | – | | 36 | 2 |
| Unión Magdalena | Total | | 94 | 5 | 1 | 0 | – | | – | | 95 | 5 |
| Millonarios | 1984 | Categoría Primera A | 33 | 0 | – | | – | | – | | 33 | 0 |
| Deportivo Cali | 1985 | Categoría Primera A | 48 | 13 | – | | – | | – | | 48 | 13 |
| Deportivo Cali | 1986 | Categoría Primera A | 46 | 5 | – | | 6 | 0 | – | | 52 | 5 |
| Deportivo Cali | 1987 | Categoría Primera A | 37 | 4 | – | | 6 | 1 | – | | 43 | 5 |
| Deportivo Cali | Total | | 131 | 22 | – | | 12 | 1 | – | | 143 | 23 |
| Montpellier | 1988–89 | Division 1 | 24 | 1 | 2 | 0 | 1 | 0 | – | | 27 | 1 |
| Montpellier | 1989–90 | Division 1 | 18 | 1 | 5 | 1 | – | | – | | 23 | 2 |
| Montpellier | 1990–91 | Division 1 | 35 | 2 | 2 | 0 | 4 | 0 | – | | 41 | 2 |
| Montpellier | Total | | 77 | 4 | 9 | 1 | 5 | 0 | – | | 91 | 5 |
| Real Valladolid | 1991–92 | La Liga | 17 | 1 | 4 | 0 | – | | – | | 21 | 1 |
| Independiente Medellín | 1992 | Categoría Primera A | 10 | 1 | – | | – | | – | | 10 | 1 |
| Atlético Junior | 1993 | Categoría Primera A | 35 | 4 | – | | – | | – | | 35 | 4 |
| Atlético Junior | 1994 | Categoría Primera A | 18 | 1 | – | | 7 | 0 | – | | 25 | 1 |
| Atlético Junior | 1995 | Categoría Primera A | 29 | 0 | – | | – | | – | | 29 | 0 |
| Atlético Junior | Total | | 82 | 5 | – | | 7 | 0 | – | | 89 | 5 |
| Tampa Bay Mutiny | 1996 | MLS | 23 | 4 | 1 | 1 | – | | 4 | 0 | 28 | 5 |
| Tampa Bay Mutiny | 1997 | MLS | 20 | 3 | 1 | 0 | – | | 2 | 0 | 23 | 3 |
| Tampa Bay Mutiny | Total | | 43 | 7 | 2 | 1 | – | | 6 | 0 | 51 | 8 |
| Deportivo Cali (loan) | 1996–97 | Categoría Primera A | 18 | 4 | – | | 3 | 1 | – | | 21 | 5 |
| Miami Fusion | 1998 | MLS | 18 | 2 | 1 | 0 | – | | 2 | 0 | 21 | 2 |
| Miami Fusion | 1999 | MLS | 4 | 1 | – | | – | | – | | 4 | 1 |
| Miami Fusion | Total | | 22 | 3 | 1 | 0 | – | | 2 | 0 | 25 | 3 |
| Tampa Bay Mutiny | 1999 | MLS | 27 | 3 | 2 | 0 | – | | 2 | 0 | 31 | 3 |
| Tampa Bay Mutiny | 2000 | MLS | 32 | 1 | 2 | 0 | – | | 2 | 0 | 36 | 1 |
| Tampa Bay Mutiny | 2001 | MLS | 12 | 1 | 1 | 0 | – | | – | | 13 | 1 |
| Tampa Bay Mutiny | Total | | 71 | 5 | 5 | 0 | – | | 4 | 0 | 80 | 5 |
| Colorado Rapids | 2001 | MLS | 12 | 0 | – | | – | | – | | 12 | 0 |
| Colorado Rapids | 2002 | MLS | 27 | 1 | 2 | 0 | – | | 5 | 1 | 34 | 2 |
| Colorado Rapids | Total | | 39 | 1 | 2 | 0 | – | | 5 | 1 | 46 | 2 |
| Career total | | | 637 | 58 | 24 | 2 | 27 | 2 | 17 | 1 | 705 | 63 |

=== International ===
Scores and results list Colombia's goal tally first, score column indicates score after each Valderrama goal.

List of international goals scored by Carlos Valderrama
| No. | Date | Venue | Opponent | Score | Result | Competition |
|---|---|---|---|---|---|---|
| 1 | 1 July 1987 | Estadio Gigante de Arroyito, Rosario, Argentina | Bolivia | 1–0 | 2–0 | 1987 Copa América |
| 2 | 30 March 1988 | Estadio Centenario, Armenia, Colombia | Canada | 2–0 | 3–0 | Friendly |
| 3 | 24 June 1989 | Miami Orange Bowl, Miami, United States | United States | 1–0 | 1–0 | Friendly |
| 4 | 27 June 1989 | Miami Orange Bowl, Miami, United States | Haiti | 3–0 | 4–0 | Friendly |
| 5 | 9 June 1990 | Stadio Renato Dall'Ara, Bologna, Italy | United Arab Emirates | 2–0 | 2–0 | 1990 FIFA World Cup |
| 6 | 22 July 1995 | Estadio Domingo Burgueño, Maldonado, Uruguay | United States | 2–0 | 4–1 | 1995 Copa América |
| 7 | 7 July 1996 | Estadio Metropolitano Roberto Meléndez, Barranquilla, Colombia | Uruguay | 2–0 | 3–1 | 1998 FIFA World Cup qualification |
| 8 | 20 August 1997 | Estadio Metropolitano Roberto Meléndez, Barranquilla, Colombia | Bolivia | 2–0 | 3–0 | 1998 FIFA World Cup qualification |
| 9 | 16 November 1997 | Estadio Alberto J. Armando, Buenos Aires, Argentina | Argentina | 1–0 | 1–1 | 1998 FIFA World Cup qualification |
| 10 | 23 May 1998 | Giants Stadium, East Rutherford, United States | Scotland | 1–0 | 2–2 | Friendly |
| 11 | 31 May 1998 | Waldstadion, Frankfurt, Germany | Germany | 1–3 | 1–3 | Friendly |

== Honours ==
Montpellier

- Coupe de France: 1990

Atletico Junior

- Colombian Championship: 1993, 1995

Tampa Bay Mutiny

- MLS Supporters' Shield: 1996

Individual

- Copa América MVP: 1987
- South American Footballer of the Year: 1987, 1993
- South American Team of the Year: 1987, 1993, 1996
- MLS Best XI: 1996, 1997, 2000
- MLS All-Star: 1996, 1997, 1998, 1999, 2000
- Major League Soccer MVP: 1996
- MLS All-Time Best XI: Midfielder
- World Soccer's 100 Greatest Footballers of All Time: 1999
- Colombian Player of the Century: 1999
- MLS Assist leader: 2000 (26 assists – a single season record)
- FIFA 100: 2004
- Copa América Historical Dream Team: 2011
- Golden Foot: 2013, as football legend

== See also ==
- List of men's footballers with 100 or more international caps

Sporting positions
| Preceded by Gabriel Martínez | Atlético Junior captain 1993–1995 | Succeeded by Jorge Bolaño |
