= Iyal Mansour =

Iyal Mansour عيال منصور
- Sub-district
- Location in Yemen
- Country: Yemen
- Governorate: Sana'a
- District: Nihm

Population (2004)
  - Total: 7,337
- Time zone: UTC+3

Iyal Mansour (Arabic: عيال منصور) is a sub-district located in Nihm District, Sana'a Governorate, Yemen. Iyal Mansour had a population of 7337 according to the 2004 census.
