= Araiza =

Araiza is a surname. Notable people with the surname include:

- Armando Araiza (born 1969), Mexican actor
- Francisco Araiza (born 1950), Mexican operatic tenor
- José Joaquín Araiza (1900–1971), Mexican chess master
- Manuel Enrique Ovalle Araiza (born 1968), Mexican politician
- Matt Araiza (born 2000), American football player
- Raúl Araiza (born 1964), Mexican actor and television presenter
- Raúl Araiza (director) (1935–2013), Mexican director, actor and producer

== See also ==
- Ariza (surname)
