= Pozuel =

Pozuel may refer to several places:

- Pozuel del Campo, a town in the province of Teruel, Aragón, Spain
- Pozuel de Ariza, a town in the province of Zaragoza, Aragón, Spain
