= Iyal Ghafir =

Iyal Ghafir عيال غفير
- Sub-district
- Location in Yemen
- Country: Yemen
- Governorate: Sana'a
- District: Nihm

Population (2004)
  - Total: 8,652
- Time zone: UTC+3

Iyal Ghafir (Arabic: عيال غفير) is a sub-district located in Nihm District, Sana'a Governorate, Yemen. Iyal Ghafir had a population of 8652 according to the 2004 census.
