= Marhabah (Sanaa) =

Marhabah مرهبة
- Sub-district
- Country: Yemen
- Governorate: Sana'a
- District: Nihm

Population (2004)
  - Total: 6,431
- Time zone: UTC+3

Marhabah (Arabic: مرهبة) is a sub-district located in Nihm District, Sana'a Governorate, Yemen. Marhabah had a population of 6431 according to the 2004 census.
