= Wandly Yazid =

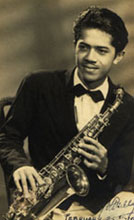
- Wandly Yazid on the saxophone, 1953.
- Born: 24 February 1925; Suliki, West Sumatra
- Died: 5 August 2005 (aged 80); Singapore
- Occupation: Composer

Hj Wandly Yazid, known as Pak Wandly (24 February 1925 – 5 August 2005) is a composer, arranger and musician, who contributed to the Malay film and music industry from the 1940s to the 1960s. He performed as a violinist with the Singapore Symphony Orchestra. In 2001, he received the COMPASS Meritorious Award by Composers and Authors Society of Singapore. He composed Gurindam Jiwa, the theme song for the classic film of the same name. In 2015, the song won the Top Song Award at Viva Musik SG50 by Suria, Warna 94.2FM, and Ria 89.7 FM.

== Background ==
Wandly Yazid was born on 24 February 1925 in Suliki, West Sumatra, Indonesia into a family of educators. His father Jazid Sutan Caniago was from Suliki and his mother Djalinoen Daud from Payakumbuh, both in Limapuluh Kota valley, West Sumatra.

He was educated in Dutch primary and high schools, and graduated from the Teachers Training Institute, West Sumatra.

== Music ==
Introduced to music during his primary school days, Wandly decided to study music at 17, when he was a schoolteacher. He learnt the violin and clarinet under teachers Pak Hamid and Mr I Bree. He also studied watercolour and oil painting under the late Indonesian master artist Wakidi, in Bukittinggi.

In 1947, this Minangkabau lad came to Singapore, where the Malay film industry was thriving. Here, he studied piano arrangement under Mr Concordio Soliano, and violin under Mr Raquiza and Mr Paul Soliano. He also learnt to play the saxophone and clarinet under Mr Paul Martinez.

== Achievements ==
Proficient in four instruments–piano, violin, clarinet and saxophone, Pak Wandly also wrote music scores. He formed the Wandy Yazid Orkestra, Wandy Five and the Megawati Orkestra (with The Radio Malaya) all in 1952, as well as set up his own record label.

He composed music for films by the Nusantara Film Company such as Angin Berpesan (1954), where he composed the song Kasih Bermula, accompanied by the Megawati Orkestra, which he conducted.

Wandly received an award for the music direction of Hassan's Homecoming (1954) for the Malayan Film Unit (now National Film Development Corporation Malaysia) or FINAS. Directed by Mohd Zain Hussain, this documentary was screened at the 8th Edinburgh International Film Festival (1954) and won Best Film (Non-Drama) at the 2nd Southeast Asia Film Festival, Singapore in 1955.

In 1956, he performed with the Singapore Symphony Orchestra as a violinist.

In 1959, Wandly founded the Fajar Record Company, where he composed and arranged songs, and accompanied singers like Julie Sudiro, Orchid Abdullah and Rosiah Chik. He also trained those who later became successful including Ernie Djohan and Rafeah Buang.

The 1960s saw him composing and arranging songs and background music for more than 13 classic films under Cathay-Keris Films (now Cathay Organisation), including Hang Jebat (1961), Jalak Lenteng (1961), Lanchang Kuning (1962), Panglima Besi (1964), Kasih Ibu (1965), Gurindam Jiwa (1965), Naga di Tasik Cini (1966), and many others. Gurindam Jiwa was to become a popular film, mostly due to his composition of the theme song, also titled Gurindam Jiwa. Originally sung by R. Ismail and Rafeah Buang, with lyrics by Hamzah Hussein, the song remains an evergreen favourite for many fans until today. Wandly was also appointed Music Director of Cathay-Keris Films during this time.

In the 1970s, Pak Wandly composed and arranged songs and background music for television programmes like Pesta Pop, as well as radio programmes.

In 1976, he became a violinist and member of the Singapore Broadcasting Corporation (now MediaCorp) Orchestra.

He later formed his own band, Café Vienna Trio, with Mr Ahmad Jarr and Mr Ahmad Sahab. They played classical and commercial music at Holiday Inn. He also gave solo piano performances at major hotels.

== Later life and art ==
Retiring in 1992, he continued to perform, and taught music to the young.

Not only was he a musician, but an artist. His watercolour paintings were exhibited at:

- 2001: Contemporary 2001, by Association of Artists of Various Resources (APAD), Singapore Calligraphy Centre
- 2005: Lakaran Warisan, by Taman Warisan Melayu (Malay Heritage Centre)

He died on 5 Aug 2005 at his Aljunied Crescent home. He leaves behind his wife, Hjh Iswanar Wahid, and five children – three of whom hold a master's degree, and one a bachelors.

== Membership ==
Wandly Yazid was a member of Composers and Authors Society of Singapore (COMPASS); PERKAMUS; APAD; Niniek Mamak (Council of Advisors), Singapore Minangkabau Association; and National Arts Council (Singapore) (NAC).

== Awards and recognition ==
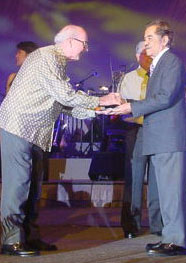
Wandly Yazid receiving the COMPASS Meritorious Award from Brother McNally (2001)

- 1953: Award for Best Documentary, by Malayan Film Unit for Hassan’s Homecoming. Highly commended background music by Wandly Yazid.
- 2001: Jasawan Agung Minang (Meritorious Minang Award), by Persatuan Minangkabau Singapura or Singapore Minangkabau Association (SMA).
- 2001: COMPASS Meritorious Award, by Composers and Authors Society of Singapore (COMPASS).
- 2002: 7 Magnificent Composers (7 Tokoh Muzik), published by Association of Malay Singers, Composers and Professional Musicians (PERKAMUS). Recognition of outstanding composers Wandly Yazid, Zubir Said, Osman Ahmad, Yusoff B., Ahmad Jaafar, P. Ramlee and Kassim Masdor.
- 2003: Simfoni Layar Perak, a concert by MediaCorp, held at Esplanade, Singapore. Due recognition to renowned composers and music arrangers of Malay film and music from the 1940s to 1960s, including Wandly Yazid, Yusoff B., Zubir Said, Osman Ahmad, P. Ramlee and S. Sudarmaji.
- 2005: Dendang Temasek (Melodies of Temasek), published by PERKAMUS. Compilation of essays on traditional Malay music with special mention of Wandly Yazid and his songs.
- 2006: Persembahan Muzik 7 Lagenda (Remembering the 7 Magnificent Composers), performed by the Pentatronics, a 4-piece group, held at Library@Espalanade, Singapore as a tribute to the legendary seven.
- 2013: Keronchong 1001 Malam, a concert by Maya Gallery as part of Malay CultureFest 2013, organised by Malay Heritage Centre, under (National Heritage Board (Singapore)), paid tribute to keronchong. Performed by musicians from Wandly Yazid Orkestra (Singapore & West Sumatra), Orkes Keronchong Putrajaya (Malaysia) and Akademi Seni Budaya dan Warisan Kebangsaan (Aswara), the recital performed classic Malay songs from 1960s including evergreen music composed by Wandly Yazid. Produced by Jeffrey Wandly, with music direction by Azmy Hassan (Singapore) and choreography by Hardie Pusako (West Sumatra). Performances by Julie Sudiro and R. Ismail.
- 2014, 26 September: The song Gurindam Jiwa was performed at the Classical Music in the Context of ASEAN International Symposium, at Princess Galyani Vadhana Institute of Music (PGVIM), Thailand. Special mention of composer Wandly Yazid, who was a member of the Singapore Symphony Orchestra and music director of Cathay-Keris Films. The song is described to be in the style of "Asli" (traditional) music, usually performed in a leisurely tempo inspired by soulful poetic body movements that project the graceful and charming native of Malay ladies. Performed by Princess Galyani Vadhana Institute of Music Youth orchestra (PYO) as part of the ASEAN Youth Orchestra (a partnership project between Ministry of Culture, Thailand and PGVIM). Arranged by Wiwat Suthiyam, and conducted by Vanich Potavanich.
- 2015: Top Song Award was accorded to Gurindam Jiwa, composed by Wandly Yazid, at Viva Musik SG50 (Celebrating 50 dynamic years of Singapore Malay Music), presented by Suria, Warna 94.2FM, and Ria 89.7 FM, held at the Kallang Theatre.
- 2018, 19 August: Screening of Hassan's Homecoming (1954), the award-winning documentary by Malayan Film Unit (now FINAS), at Galeri Petronas, KLCC, Kuala Lumpur. Music direction by Wandly Yazid.
- 2018, 8 September: Konsert Gurindam Jiwa, a tribute concert to Wandly Yazid's music and journey, as part of Silver Arts 2018 by National Arts Council, Singapore. Produced by Saiful Amri, music direction by Syafiqah 'Adha Sallehin, with Jeffrey Wandly as executive consultant. Performances by R. Ismail, Julie Sudiro and Rudy Djoharnaen.

== See also ==
- Malays in Singapore
- Cinema of Singapore
- Cinema of Malaysia
