= Iyal Sayad =

Iyal Sayad عيال صياد
- Sub-district
- Location in Yemen
- Country: Yemen
- Governorate: Sana'a
- District: Nihm

Population (2004)
  - Total: 10,364
- Time zone: UTC+3

Iyal Sayad (Arabic: عيال صياد) is a sub-district located in Nihm District, Sana'a Governorate, Yemen. Iyal Sayad had a population of 10364 according to the 2004 census.
