= Época (Spanish magazine) =

Spanish weekly news magazine, 1985–2013

- Categories: News magazine
- Frequency: Weekly
- Founder: Jaime Campmany
- Founded: 1985
- Final issue: 2013
- Company: Intereconomía Corporation
- Country: Spain
- Based in: Madrid
- Language: Spanish

Época was a Spanish weekly news magazine published in Madrid, Spain, from 1985 to 2013.

== History and profile ==
Established by Jaime Campmany in 1985, Época was a conservative publication by Intereconomía Corporation. The US Department of State also described the magazine as a conservative publication in 2000. The headquarters of the magazine was in Madrid.

In 1994 Época had a circulation of 67,000 copies.

Época became La Gaceta's Sunday magazine in 2009, but La Gaceta was defunct by Intereconomía in 2013. It had among its contributors Julián Marías, Ramón Pi, Pilar Urbano, Emilio Romero, Manuel Alcántara and Ricardo de la Cierva.

Although described by its publisher as "a reference," Época was the focus of several controversies in the 2000s. In 2008, it alleged that Infanta Elena was trying to annul her marriage to Jaime de Marichalar in that Marichalar used cocaine. In the following year, the magazines accused María Teresa Fernández de la Vega of electoral fraud for including her name after the legal period of the election. Both Marichalar and de la Vega opened legal actions against the magazine.

== See also ==
- List of magazines in Spain
