= Intereconomía Corporation =

Spanish media group

- Industry: Media
- Founded: 1995
- Founder: Julio Ariza
- Headquarters: Calle Modesto Lafuente 42, Madrid, Spain
- Products: Radio stations, a national broadcast channel, newspaper and magazines
- Owner: Independent
- Number of employees: 600–800
- Parent: Intereconomía Group

Intereconomía Corporation is a Spanish media group which owns radio stations, a national broadcast channel, newspaper and magazines. The chairman is Julio Ariza, who is also the main stakeholder.

Intereconomía headquarters are located in Madrid, but it also has offices in Barcelona and Valencia, where over 600 employees currently work. The corporate logo is a bull, inspired by the famous bull statue located on Wall Street.

According to his principles Intereconomía defends the sanctity of human life, individual freedom and free enterprise, and Spanish unity.

== History ==
Former logo from 2012.

Intereconomía was created in 1995. It started as small radio station broadcasting finance information. Since then, it has increased its influence in the Spanish media spectrum.

Its expansion eventually led to a corporate simplification into 5 companies related to its core business: radio, TV, newspapers, online, events and films.

== Shows ==
The company's most popular TV shows are El Gato al Agua and Punto Pelota. Intereconomía is good at reporting hard news because of his live connections and debates. Its ratings soared when the 15-M demonstrations took place Spain and whenever Real Madrid plays against FC Barcelona.

== Publications ==
- Época (1985–2013)
- La Gaceta (2009–2013)
