= List of power stations in Mauritania =

This article lists power stations in Mauritania. Energy is distributed by the national Mauritania Electricity Company (Somelec). Most energy comes from small, distributed diesel generators, but grid-connected electricity is rapidly increasing, particularly renewable energy due to Mauritania's favorable wind and solar conditions.

Mauritania exports surplus energy to Senegal and Mali, while also benefiting from hydroelectric dams in Mali.

== Thermal ==
Thermal power station	Community	Coordinates	Fuel type	Capacity	Year completed	Owner	Notes
Nouadhibou Thermal Power Station	Nouadhibou		Natural gas	120 MW	2014	Somelec & Others	

== Solar ==
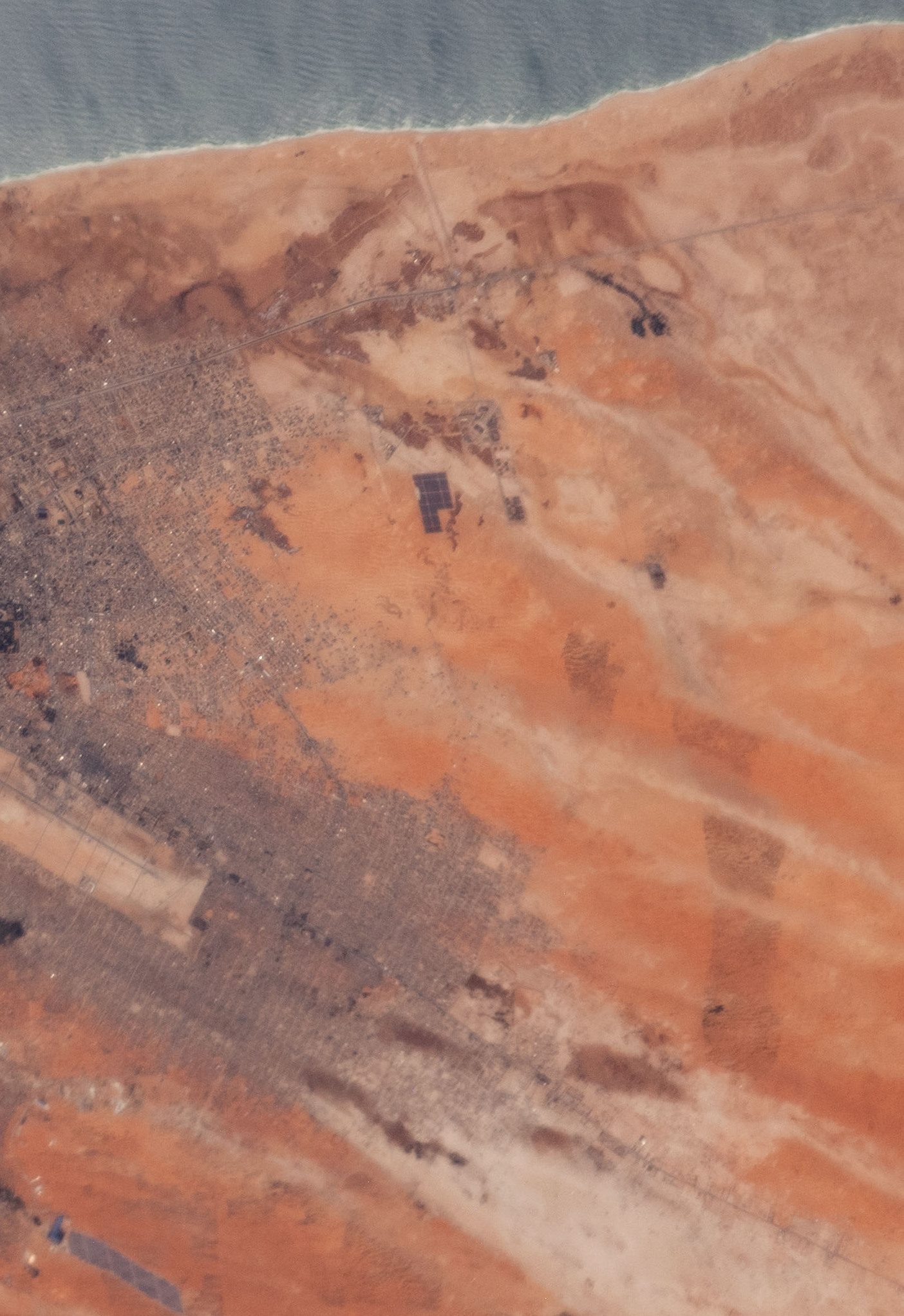
Centrale solaire de Sheikh Zayed

Solar power station	Community	Coordinates	Capacity	Year completed	Owner	Notes
Sheikh Zayed Solar Power Plant	Nouakchott		15 MW	2013	Masdar of Abu Dhabi	
Eight plants in rural areas	Atar and others		16.6 MW	2016	Masdar of Abu Dhabi	
Zouerat solar plant	Zouérat		3 MW	2013		
Nouakchott solar plant	Nouakchott		50 MW			Planned

== Wind ==
Wind farm	Community	Coordinates	Capacity	Year completed	Owner	Notes
Boulenouar Wind Power Station	Boulenoir	21°18′16″N 16°31′05″W	102.3 MW		Siemens	Under construction
Nouadhibou Wind Power Station	Nouadhibou		4.4 MW	2011	Somelec and others	
Nouakchott Wind Power Station	Nouakchott		30 MW	2015		

== See also ==
- List of power stations in Africa
- List of largest power stations in the world
- Energy in Mauritania
