= Al-Hanashat =

Al-Hanashat الحنشات
- Sub-district
- Location in Yemen
- Coordinates: 15.82099°N 44.50955°E
- Country: Yemen
- Governorate: Sana'a
- District: Nihm

Population (2004)
  - Total: 8,718
- Time zone: UTC+3

Al-Hanashat (Arabic: الحنشات) is a sub-district located in Nihm District, Sana'a Governorate, Yemen. Al-Hanashat had a population of 8718 according to the 2004 census.
