= Boulenouar Wind Power Station =

Power station in Boulenouar, Mauritania

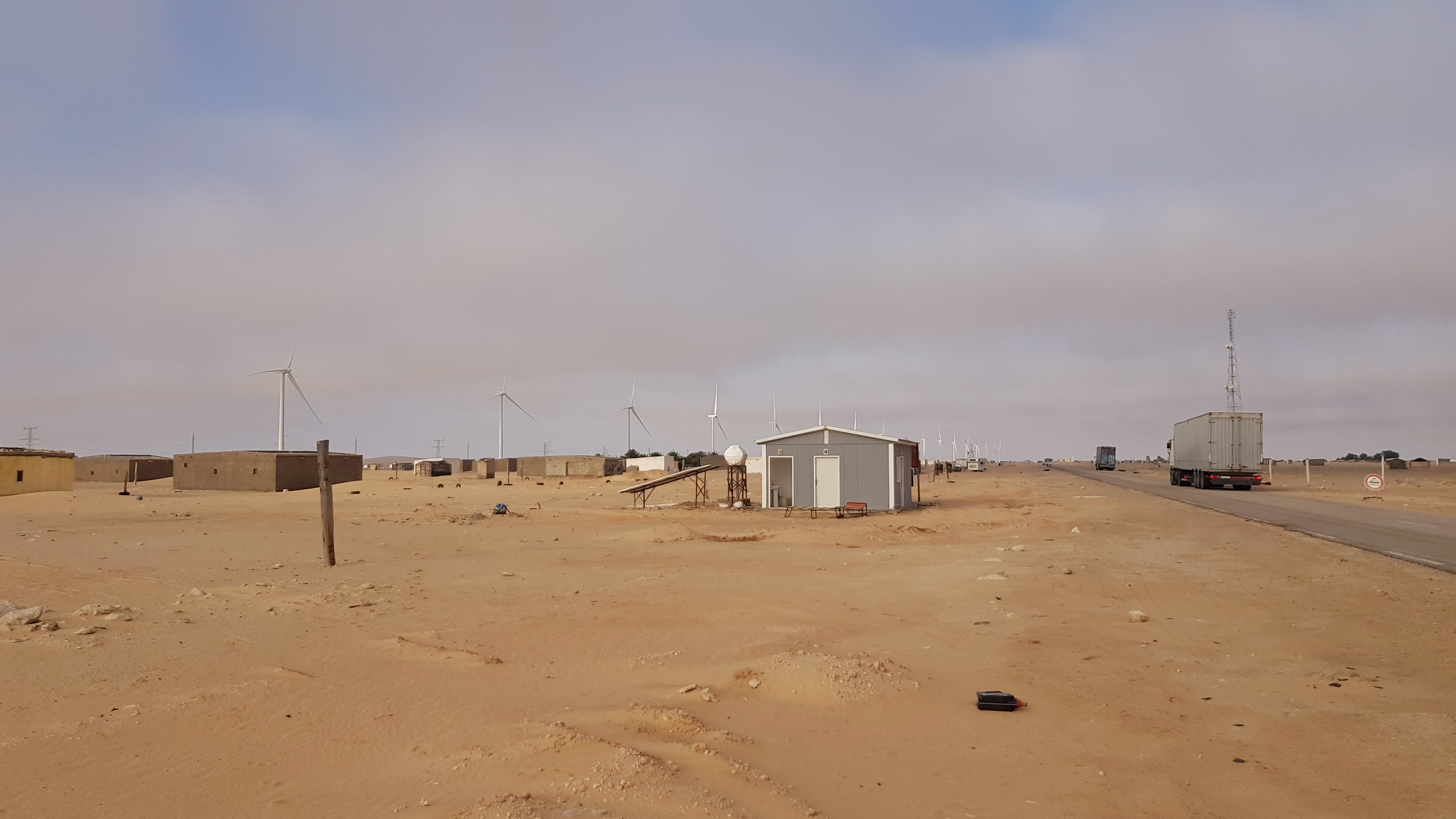
- Country: Mauritania
- Location: Boulenouar
- Coordinates: 21°18′16″N 16°31′05″W
- Status: Under construction
- Construction began: 2020 Expected
- Commission date: 2022 Expected
- Construction cost: €140 million

Power generation
- Nameplate capacity: 102.375 MW (137,287 hp)

Boulenouar Wind Power Station, also Boulenoir Wind Power Station, is a 102.375 MW (137,287 hp) wind power plant, under development in Mauritania. When completed, as expected in 2022, the power station will be the largest wind power station in Mauritania.

== Location ==
The power station is located in the village of Boulenouar approximately 400 kilometres (249 mi), northwest of the city of Nouakchott, the capital of Mauritania. This is in the extreme northwest of the country, close to the international border with Morocco.

== Overview ==
The wind farm consists of 39 Siemens-Gamesa turbines, each with rated capacity of 2.625 megawatts. The total installed capacity of the power station is 102.375 megawatts.

== Development ==
The power station is owned by the consortium that is developing it and will operate it once construction is completed. The shareholders in the consortium are (a) the German conglomerate Siemens and (b) the Spanish wind turbine manufacturer Siemens Gamesa. The Spanish technology conglomerate Elecnor was part of the consortium but withdrew and sold its shareholding to Siemens, in the third quarter of 2020.

== Costs and funding ==
As of September 2020, the development of this power station is budgeted at €140 million. The Arab Fund for Economic and Social Development (AFESD), a Kuwait-based development finance institution that is part of the Arab League, has committed to lend €120 million towards the development of this power station.

== Impact ==
As of 2020, Mauritania uses approximately 380 megawatts of electricity. Of this, approximately 76 percent (approx. 289 MW), is sourced from thermal generators. The remaining 24 percent (approx. 91 MW), is imported from Manantali Hydroelectric Power Station in Mali. With the country's population growling at 2.6 percent annually, renewable sources of energy, particularly solar and wind, offer an environmentally friendly pathway to expand its electricity supply and stimulate economic growth.

== See also ==
- List of power stations in Mauritania
