= Nouadhibou (department) =

- Department
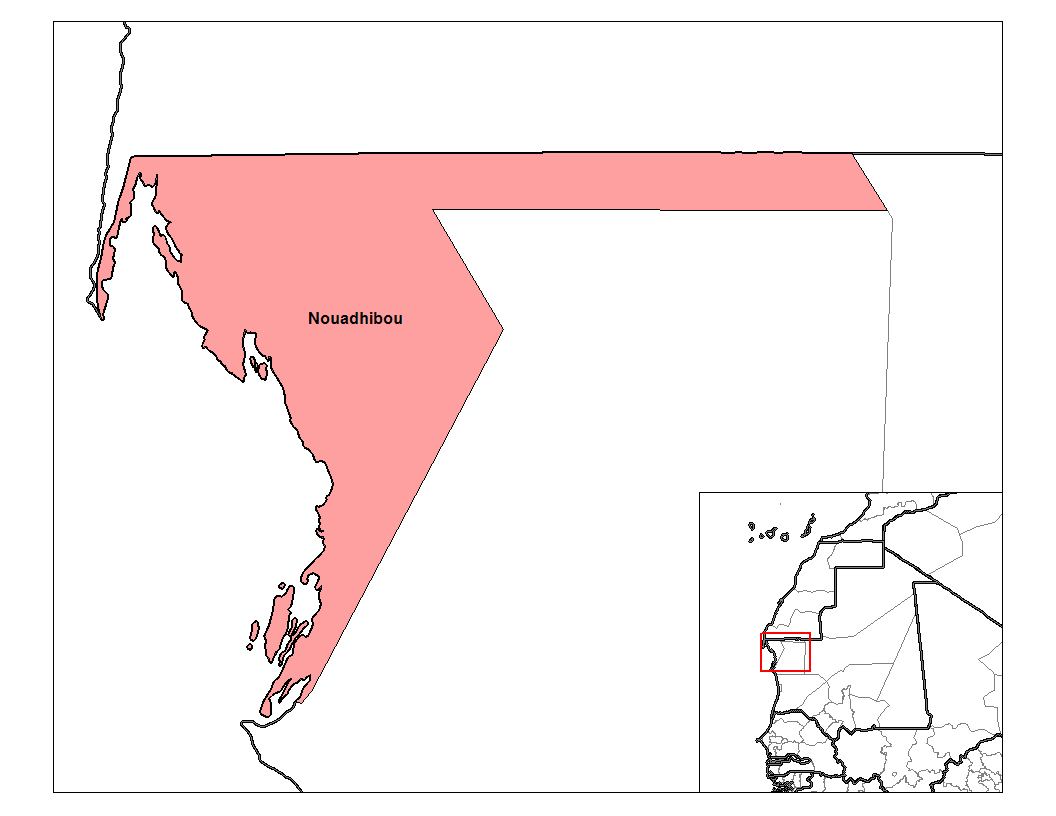

- Location within Mauritania
- Country: Mauritania

Area
  - Total: 16,211 km^{2} (6,259 sq mi)

Population (2013 census)
  - Total: 121,122
  - Density: 7.4716/km^{2} (19.351/sq mi)

Nouadhibou is a department in Dakhlet Nouadhibou Region in Mauritania.

== List of municipalities in the department ==
The Nouadhibou department is made up of following communes:

- Boulenouar
- Inal
- Nouadhibou
