= Azizah Abd Allah Abu Lahum =

Yemeni novelist and writer

- Born: 1945 (age 80–81); Nihm District, Sana'a
- Other names: Azizah Abd Allah
- Occupation: Novelist
- Years active: 1997-present

Azizah Abd Allah Abu Lahum (born 1945) is a Yemeni novelist and writer. She was born in Nihm District into a prominent sheikh family, and although she did not have formal schooling, she was brought up in a culturally aware environment. She married a diplomat which allowed her to live abroad and experience foreign cultures, before returning to live in Sana'a.

Along with Ramziyya al-Iryani, Azizah is considered one of the pioneering women of contemporary Yemeni literature. Her first novel Ahlam wa Nabilah was published from Cairo in 1997 and she has published several more novels since. More broadly, she has played a major role in the women's rights movement in Yemen. She helped to establish the Yemeni Women's Association in the 1970s and also participated in the US-based Arab Women's Council.

Because of the prominence of the Abu Lahum name, Azizah prefers to publish under the name of Azizah Abd Allah.
