= Inal, Mauritania =

Coordinates: 21°15′N 14°57′W

Inal إنال
- Commune and village
- Interactive map of Inal
- Country: Mauritania
- Region: Dakhlet Nouadhibou
- Department: Nouadhibou (department)

Government
  - Mayor: Cheikh Ely Baba

Population (2023)
  - Total: 183
- Time zone: UTC±00:00 (GMT)

Inal is a village and rural commune in Mauritania, situated on the Mauritania Railway line from Nouadhibou to Zouerate.

On the night of November 27, 1990, 28 black soldiers arrested in the previous weeks were allegedly tortured, hung and buried in a "mass grave" at Inal, in a celebratory act of the nation's Independence Day. Similar acts of ethnic cleansing were sanctioned by the Mauritanian government, as part of a larger campaign of terror and human rights abuses against black Mauritanians, from the late 1980s to the early 1990s.

Many survivors of such violence who live in the area and other affected communities still demand justice.
