= Pilar Urbano =

Spanish journalist and writer

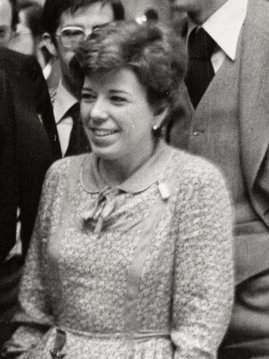
- 1979
- Born: Pilar Urbano Casaña; 1940 (age 85–86); Valencia, Spain
- Education: Official School of Journalism
- Occupations: Journalist, writer
- Employers: El Mundo; Época
- Organization: Opus Dei

Pilar Urbano Casaña (born 1940) is a Spanish journalist and writer.

== Biography ==
Pilar Urbano was born in Valencia in 1940. She currently publishes her contributions in the newspaper El Mundo. She is also a numerary member of Opus Dei.

=== Print journalism ===
After studying Philosophy and Letters, she soon channeled her professional career into the world of journalism and graduated at the top of her class from the Official School of Journalism.

She has worked, as a political commentator, at the newspapers the ABC (until 1985, where she wrote a periodical column called "Hilo directo"), Ya (1985–1989), and now in El Mundo and the magazine Época.

In 1994, she was sued for expressing opinions characterized as homophobic in an Elle magazine article.

=== Radio and television ===
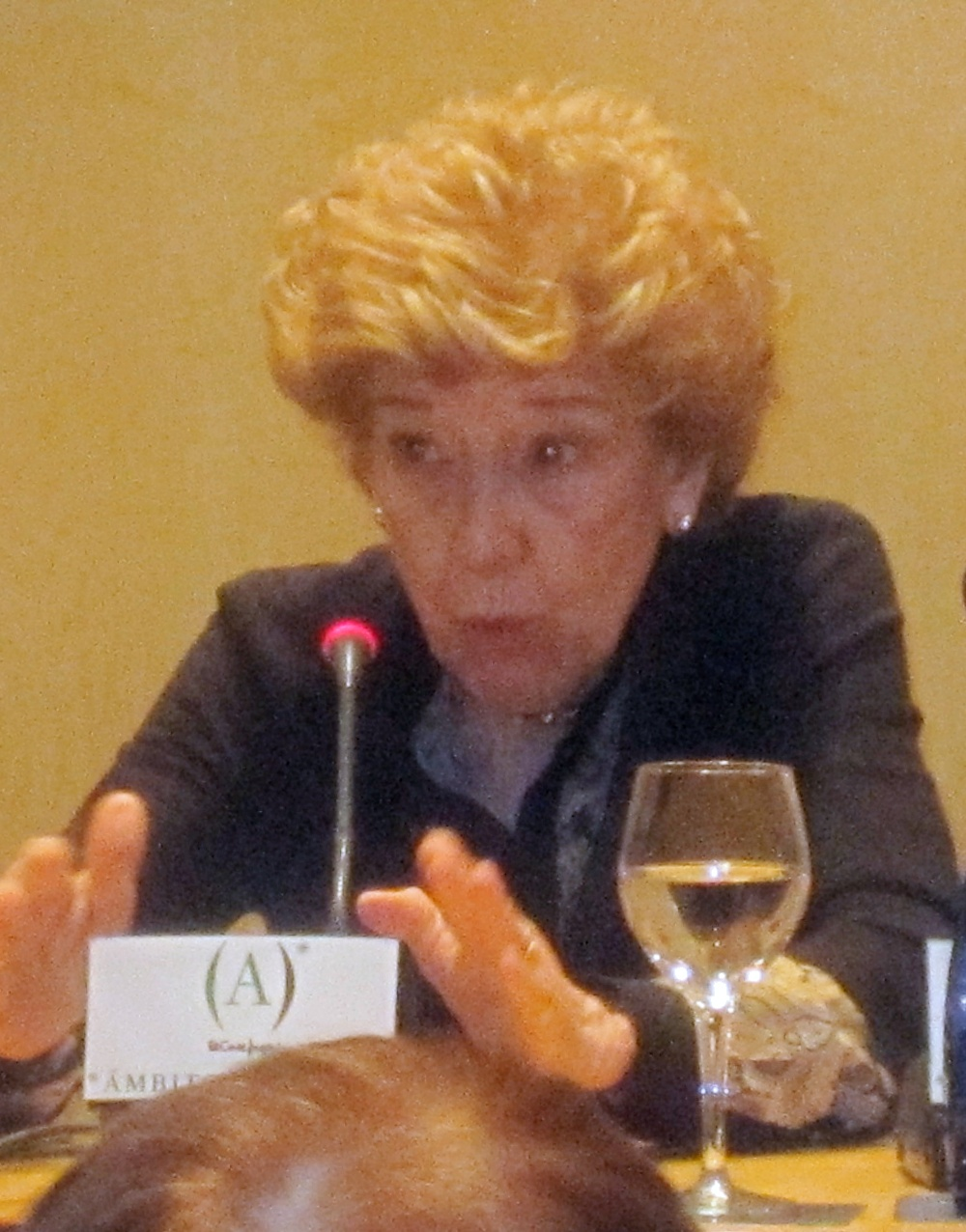
Pilar Urbano speaking at a conference

In 1988 she collaborated with Encarna Sánchez on her program Directamente Encarna on Cadena COPE. On television she did the same with Jesús Hermida, collaborating on the political tertulia of the programs La noche de Hermida (1993) and Hermida y Cía (1994), both on Antena 3.

In the 1994–1995 season, she joined the news program Informativos Telecinco, presented by Carmen Tomás.

Later she went on to the program La Brújula on Onda Cero (1995–1998), which was led by Ernesto Sáenz de Buruaga.

=== Books ===
Pilar Urbano has specialized in the publication of books on current affairs, including subjects such as the criminal plot of the September 11 attacks and the 23-F coup attempt in Spain. She was a direct witness to the latter, from the journalists' gallery of the Congress of Deputies. She was one of the people who remained standing. She later declared: "I had a submachine gun about a hand's breadth from my waist. I did not throw myself to the ground. That afternoon and that night I knew in a definite way that freedom is worth more than life."

She has also published two authorized biographies of Queen Sofía and Judge Baltasar Garzón.

In October 2008, the presentation of her book La Reina muy de cerca, published by Editorial Planeta, sparked strong controversy in Spain due to alleged statements by Queen Sofia against euthanasia, abortion, and same-sex marriage. This led to an official statement from the Royal Household in which it was said that Pilar Urbano, "after having a private conversation with Her Majesty the Queen, puts in Her Majesty's mouth alleged claims that some media reproduced today," which "do not correspond exactly to the opinions expressed by Her Majesty the Queen, as the author has been duly informed."

Before said statement, the journalist denied that the statements were of a private nature. "I have made a book with the Queen, knowing the Queen, not in the private sphere, but in the Zarzuela", adding that "what the queen has said is what appears in my book" and that the Royal House read and gave the book the "green light".

== Works ==
- España cambia la piel: entrevistas políticas (1976) ISBN 978-8473801706
- Con la venia, yo indagué el 23-F (1982) ISBN 978-8422614975
- El hombre de Villa Tevere: los años romanos de Josemaría Escrivá (1995) ISBN 978-8401375392
  - English Edition: The Man of Villa Tevere, Scepter Publishers, Princeton 2012, 378 pgs. ISBN 9781594171420
- Yo entré en el Cesid (1996) ISBN 978-8401376047
- La Reina (1997) ISBN 978-8401375552
- Garzón: el hombre que veía amanecer (2000) ISBN 978-8401376511
- Jefe Atta: el secreto de la Casa Blanca, Plaza & Janés (2003) ISBN 978-8467204186
- La madre del ajusticiado (2005) ISBN 978-8496326439
- La Reina muy de cerca (2008) ISBN 978-8408085133
- El precio del trono (2011) ISBN 978-8408107170
- La gran desmemoria. Lo que Suárez olvidó y el Rey prefiere no recordar (2014) ISBN 978-8408121459
- "Pieza 25, salvar a la infanta" (2017) ISBN 978-8491641797
