= Aziza Mint Jiddou =

Mauritanian politician

Member of Parliament
- Incumbent
- Assumed office 13 May 2023
- Constituency: Nouadhibou

Personal details
- Party: National Rally for Reform and Development (Tawāṣṣul)

Aziza Mint Jiddou is a Mauritanian politician and Member of the Mauritanian Parliament.

== Biography ==
Mint Jiddou is a Mauritanian Member of Parliament, elected by the electoral district of Nouadhibou during the 2023 Mauritanian parliamentary elections. She is a member of the National Rally for Reform and Development party, also known as Tawāṣṣul.

Mint Jiddou worked as Technical Adviser to the Minister of the Ministère des Pêches et de l'Economie Maritime (Ministry of Fisheries and Maritime Economy). In 2023, Mint Jiddou raised how there has been a violation of laws relating to the nationalization of the fishing sector and issues with the supply of drinking water in Boulenouar, during a speech in the Mauritanian Parliament. In 2025, Mint Jiddou questioned Amal mint Maouloud, Minister of Hydraulics and Sanitation, in the National Assembly about the continued water issues.

Mint Jiddou has also called for the opening of a multidisciplinary university in the town of Nouadhibou and has denounced corruption and mismanagement of local services in the capital city.
