= Maya Gallery =

- Established: 12 April 2012
- Location: 57 Genting Lane, #05-00, Singapore
- Coordinates: 1.32735°N 103.87539°E
- Type: Contemporary art gallery
- Website: mayagallery.com.sg

Maya Gallery is a contemporary, artist-run gallery in Singapore, founded in April 2012 by artist couple Jeffrey Wandly and Masturah Sha’ari, with renewed direction, centering on Malay artistic heritage. As a research-driven, non-profit institution, it is committed to documenting, preserving, and advancing key narratives in Singapore’s post-independence art history. By maintaining active dialogue on significant modern masters, continued development of its founders’ practices, and supporting contemporary artistic growth, the gallery creates a custodial space for cultural memory and critical discourse.

== History ==
Maya Gallery opened its first space in two-storey shophouse in Kampong Glam in April 2012, officiated by actor and Nominated Member of Parliament Janice Koh. It later relocated to Oxley Bizhub 2 in Ubi in 2015, before moving to its current space at Genting Lane in MacPherson/Potong Pasir during the COVID-19 pandemic in 2021.

== Artists ==
The gallery represents Singapore pioneers such as Hadiah Warisan recipient Idris Mohamed Ali, and Sarkasi Said, and the estates of Mohamed Abdul Kadir (S. Mohdir), and Sulaiman Suhaimi. It has also exhibited works by Cultural Medallion recipients Iskandar Jalil and Chng Seok Tin. It currently features works by Idris Ali, Terence Tan, Suriani Suratman, Hiroko Mita, P. Gnana, Aziza Ali, Teena Raju, Yeo Jian Long, and co-founders Jeffrey Wandly and Masturah Sha’ari, as part of its programming that includes established and emerging artists.

== Exhibitions and programmes ==
The gallery curates solo, group, thematic, heritage-focused, collaborative, and open-call exhibitions. With more than 100 showcases presented, notable ones include:

- Time and Space (2021), an exhibition that explores our built environment from the past, present, and into the future, through the eyes of three Singaporean architecture-trained professionals.
- Reflection (2021; 2024; 2025), a Ramadan-season series on introspection and relationships, including an edition featuring three artist couples.
- Serba Serbi (2022), a collaboration with Core Design Gallery, Malaysia, featuring Malaysian contemporary artists.
- Small Matter (2023; 2024), an open-call presentation of miniature artworks.
- Idris Ali: Hitam Putih (2023), a focused showcase by the Singapore pioneer artist.

=== International exhibitions ===
- Hữu Nghị: Singapore & Vietnam 50–10 (2023), at the Vietnam Fine Arts Museum (Hanoi), marking diplomatic ties.
- Creative Journeys / Những Hành Trình Sáng Tạo (2025), a commemorative exhibition in Hanoi with the Vietnam University of Fine Arts.

=== International art fairs ===
Maya Gallery has participated in various international art fairs:

- Affordable Art Fair Singapore (2014; 2015; 2016; 2023; 2024; 2025)
- Singapore Contemporary (2016; 2017), Art Expo Malaysia (2016; 2017), Art Busan (2014), and Bank Art Fair Hong Kong (2014)

== Community and education ==
The gallery organises public talks, artist conversations, and hands‑on workshops as part of its year‑round programmes, including sessions such as Art & the Built Environment, Art & Social Harmony, Kopi Talk, masterclasses, and life‑drawing/workshop activities. It also runs open calls to engage broader participation, including initiatives like “Small Matter,” and provides opportunities for Singapore‑based and international artists to present work. The gallery has also participated in fund‑raising projects and community initiatives alongside cultural partners and associations.

== Recognition ==
Maya Gallery was listed among the “Top 10 Art Galleries in Singapore” by TallyPress (2018).
