= 1987 Campeonato Profesional =

Campeonato Profesional
- Season: 1987
- Champions: Millonarios (12th title)
- Matches: 340
- Goals: 831 (2.44 per match)
- Top goalscorer: Jorge Aravena (23)

The 1987 Campeonato Profesional was season 40 of Colombia's top-flight football league. Millonarios won the league for the twelfth time after winning the Octagonal final.

== Teams ==
Team	City	Stadium
América	Cali	Olímpico Pascual Guerrero
Atlético Bucaramanga	Bucaramanga	Alfonso López
Atlético Nacional	Medellín	Atanasio Girardot
Cúcuta Deportivo	Cúcuta	General Santander
Deportes Quindío	Armenia	San José de Armenia
Deportes Tolima	Ibagué	Gustavo Rojas Pinilla
Deportivo Cali	Cali	Olímpico Pascual Guerrero
Deportivo Pereira	Pereira	Hernán Ramírez Villegas
Independiente Medellín	Medellín	Atanasio Girardot
Junior	Barranquilla	Romelio Martínez
Millonarios	Bogotá	El Campín
Once Caldas	Manizales	Palogrande
Santa Fe	Bogotá	El Campín
Unión Magdalena	Santa Marta	Eduardo Santos
