= Aziza Jafarzade =

Azerbaijani writer (1921–2003)

- Born: 29 December 1921; Baku, Azerbaijan
- Died: 4 September 2003 (aged 81); Baku, Azerbaijan
- Occupation: Writer
- Writing career
- Subject: Historical novels

Aziza Mammed qyzy Jafarzade (Note: "Mammed qyzy" in a patronymic literally meaning "daughter of Mammed:) (December 29, 1921, in Baku, Azerbaijan – September 4, 2003) (Azerbaijani: Cəfərzadə Əzizə Məmməd qızı) was an Azerbaijani writer and professor of philology. She was an expert on the history of Azerbaijani literature.

== Life ==
Aziza Jafarzadeh was born on December 29, 1921, in Baku. She received her primary education at School No. 25, then studied at the Theater Technical School and the Two-Year Teachers' Institute. From 1942 to 1944, she worked as a teacher in Chaparli village of the Agsu district. In 1946–1947, she graduated from the Faculty of Philology of Azerbaijan State University through external studies.

Between 1944 and 1946, she served as the head of the script department at the Jafar Jabbarli Azerbaijanfilm Studio. From 1947 to 1949, she was the director of the Theater Technical School, and from 1950 to 1955, she worked as an associate professor and department head at the Pedagogical Institute. In 1956, she held a position as an associate professor at the Kamchatka Pedagogical Institute. From 1957 to 1974, she worked at the Manuscripts Institute of the Azerbaijan Academy of Sciences as a senior researcher and head of department. Starting in 1974, she served as a professor at Baku State University.

Aziza Jafarzadeh was recognized as an expert in 19th-century Azerbaijani literature. She defended her candidate dissertation in 1950 on the topic "The Image of Enlightened Intellectuals in 19th-Century Azerbaijani Literature" and her doctoral dissertation in 1970 on "The Style of Folk Poetry in 19th-Century Azerbaijani Poetry."

== Death ==
Aziza Jafarzadeh died on September 4, 2003, at the age of 82, after a prolonged illness. According to her will, she was buried in the village of Tagili in the Hajigabul district, in the same cemetery as her parents, husband, and brothers.

== Career ==
Jafarzade headed the script department at the "Azerbaijanfilm" film studio named after Jafar Jabbarli during 1944–1946, before working as the principal of the theater technical director (1947–1949), docent and head of Pedagogical Institute (1950–1955), docent at the Kamchatka Pedagogical Institute (1956), senior researcher and head of department at the Institute of Manuscripts of the Azerbaijan National Academy of Sciences (1957–1974), and a professor at the Baku State University (since 1974). Jafarzadeh was renowned for her expertise in the sphere of the history of 19th-century Azerbaijani literature, and she defended her candidate thesis titled "Enlightening-intellectual figures in 19th-century Azerbaijani literature" in 1950, before gaining a PHD in the subject of "the art of folk poetry in 19th-century Azerbaijani poetry" in 1970.

== Works ==
- "Natəvan haqqında hekayələr" (1963) – A collection of stories about Khurshidbanu Natavan, the last khan of Karabakh, depicting her life in the 19th century.
- "Aləmdə səsim var mənim" (1973–1978) – The first historical novel by the author, focusing on the literary life of Seyid Azim Shirvani, a renowned 19th-century poet from Shamakhi.
- "Vətənə qayıt" (1977) – Set against the backdrop of the first arrival of Russian troops in Azerbaijan in the 18th century, this novel explores the life of poet Nishat Shirvani and the events in the Salyan region of Shirvan.
- "Yad et məni" (1980) – A novel about the life and work of Abbas Sahhat, a romantic poet active during the late 19th and early 20th centuries.
- "Bakı-1501" (1981) – A historical novel dedicated to Shah Ismail Khatai and his campaign in Baku.
- "Cəlaliyyə" (1983) – A story of Jalaliya, a female ruler of Nakhchivan in the 12th century, and her struggle to defend the country.
- "Sabir" (1989) – A work dedicated to the famous satirical poet Mirza Alakbar Sabir, who lived and worked during the late 19th and early 20th centuries.
- "Eldən elə" (1992) – A novel about the life of Zeynalabdin Shirvani, a 19th-century geographer who spent 37 years traveling the world.
- "Bir səsin faciəsi" (1995) – A tragic story about the life of Mirza Gullar, a singer from the late 19th century. * "Gülüstan"dan öncə" (1996) – A historical novel about the Russian invasion of Shirvan in the early 19th century.
- "Zərrintac-Tahirə" (1996) – A work about Tahira Qurratulayn, a female poet and one of the leaders of the Bábí movement in 19th-century Iranian Azerbaijan.
- "İşığa doğru" (1998) – A novella focusing on the tragic history associated with the echoes of the Bábí movement in 20th-century Iran.
- "Bəla" (2001) – A novel about the court struggles for power in 16th-century Azerbaijan following Shah Ismail Khatai, which ultimately led to the division of the region into small khanates.
- "Rübabə-sultanım" (2001) – A semi-biographical novel set against the backdrop of socio-political events in the 20th century.
- "Xəzərin göz yaşları" (2003) – A novella recounting the forced deportation of Iranian Azerbaijanis living in Azerbaijan to Iran by Stalin's regime in 1938.
- "Eşq sultanı" – Completed shortly before her death, this novel portrays the life of the great Azerbaijani poet Muhammad Fuzuli, who lived and created during the 15th–16th centuries.

== Awards ==
- The Honorary Decree of the Supreme Soviet of the Azerbaijan SSR. (28 December 1981)
- Order of Friendship of Peoples
- Shohrat Order
- The Individual Pension of the President of the Republic of Azerbaijan (11 June 2002)
- "Mother of Azerbaijan" (2001)
- "People's Writer of Azerbaijan" (2001)
