= Julio Ariza =

Spanish entrepreneur

Julio Ariza Irigoyen (born 1957 in Carcastillo, Navarra, Spain) is a Spanish entrepreneur who currently chairs the Grupo Intereconomia. He was part of the Spanish People's Party in Catalonia with Alejo Vidal-Quadras and an MP in the regional parliament.

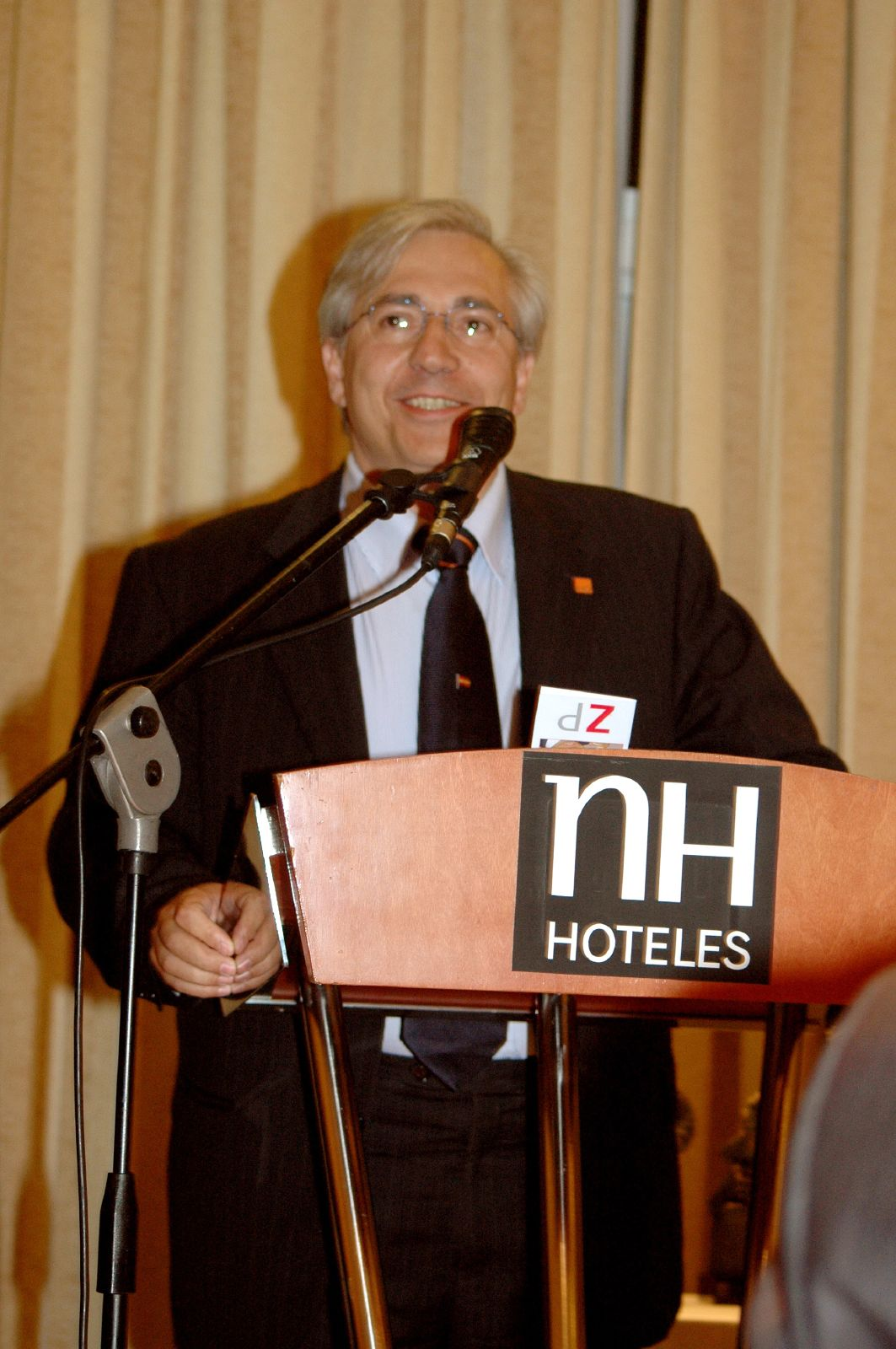
Julio Ariza 2005

After his political career in Catalonia, he moved to Madrid where he acquired Radio Intereconomía in 1997, a radio formula based on financial information and classical music. In the following years, it became a reference far-right station in Spain.

Until it filed for bankruptcy in March 2015, the Group comprised several media like television channels (IntereconomíaTV and Business TV), radio stations (Radio Inter and Radio Intereconomía) and the newspaper La Gaceta, with a strong conservative and anti-abortion ideology.
