= Alconchel de Ariza =

- municipality
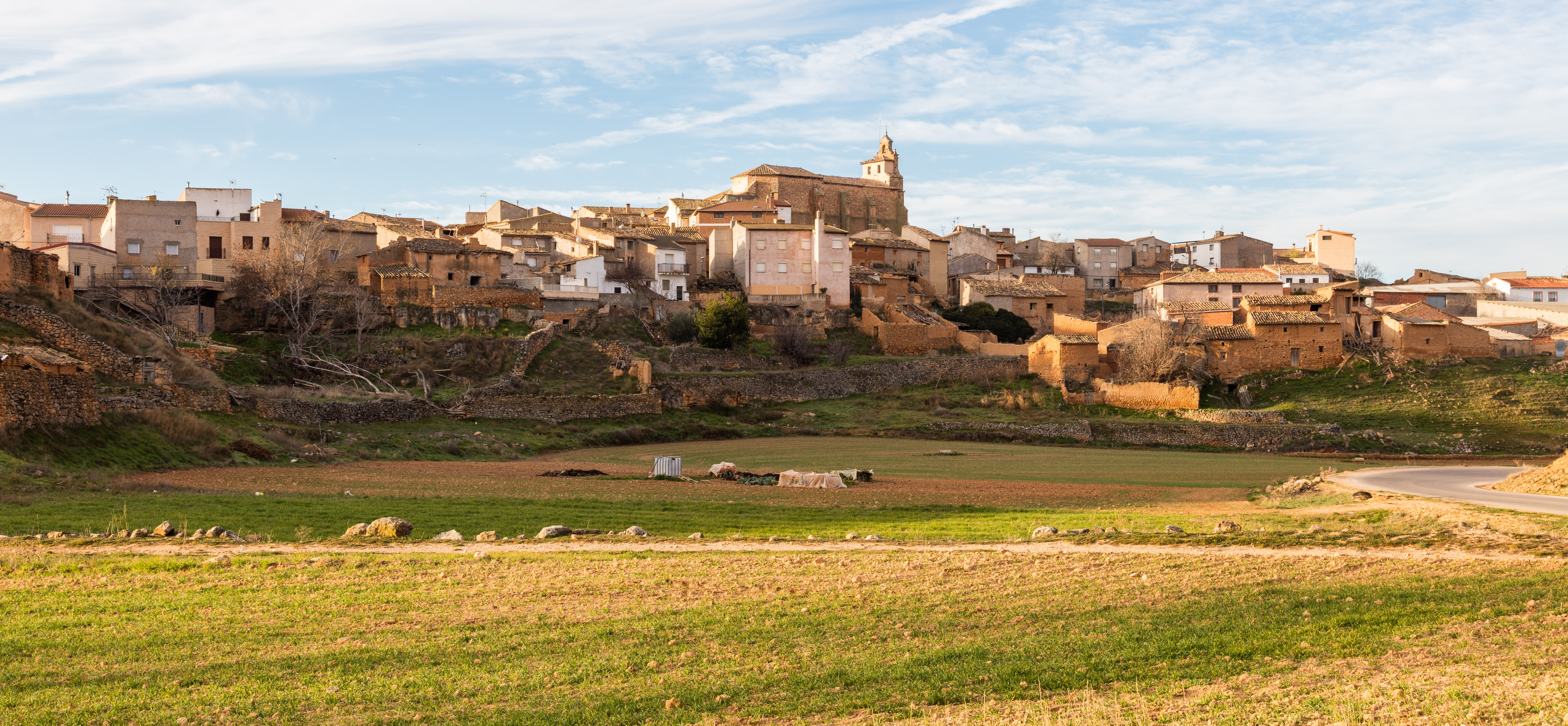

- Coat of arms

- Location within Aragon Location within Spain Location within Europe
- Country: Spain
- Autonomous community: Aragon
- Province: Zaragoza
- Municipality: Alconchel de Ariza

Area
  - Total: 35 km^{2} (14 sq mi)

Population (2025-01-01)
  - Total: 79
  - Density: 2.3/km^{2} (5.8/sq mi)
- Time zone: UTC+1 (CET)
  - Summer (DST): UTC+2 (CEST)

Alconchel de Ariza is a municipality in the province of Zaragoza, Aragon, Spain. According to the 2004 census (INE), the municipality has a population of 128.

== See also ==
- List of municipalities in Zaragoza
