= Tillandsia ariza-juliae =

Scientific classification
- Kingdom: Plantae
- Clade: Tracheophytes
- Clade: Angiosperms
- Clade: Monocots
- Clade: Commelinids
- Order: Poales
- Family: Bromeliaceae
- Genus: Tillandsia
- Subgenus: Tillandsia subg. Tillandsia
- Species: T. ariza-juliae

Binomial name
- Tillandsia ariza-juliae L.B.Sm. & J.J.Jiménez

Species of plant

Tillandsia ariza-juliae, the wand airplant, is a species in the genus Tillandsia. It is native to the Dominican Republic and Puerto Rico.

== Cultivars ==
- Tillandsia 'Pruinariza'
