= Manuel Enrique Ovalle Araiza =

Mexican politician

- Born: 7 April 1968 (age 58); Mexico
- Occupation: Politician
- Political party: PAN

Manuel Enrique Ovalle Araiza (born 7 April 1968) is a Mexican politician affiliated with the National Action Party. He served as Deputy of the LIX Legislature of the Mexican Congress as a plurinominal representative, and previously served as a local deputy in the LI Legislature of the Congress of Querétaro.
