= René Ariza =

American dramatist

- Born: 1940; Havana, Cuba
- Died: 1994 (aged 53–54); San Francisco, California
- Occupations: Actor, playwright, theater director

René Ariza (1940–1994) was a Cuban actor, director, and writer born in Havana, Cuba.

== Biography ==
Ariza graduated from the Academia Municipal de Artes Dramáticas in 1959, eventually receiving the Premio de la Unión Nacional de Escritores y Artistas de Cuba (UNEAC) in 1967 for his play La vuelta a la manzana.

An opponent of the Castro regime, he was jailed in 1974 for his political views until Amnesty International intervened and he was released in 1979. Ariza left Cuba during the Mariel boatlift and settled in Miami, where he continued to develop professionally.

His theatrical work carries a marked political valence and has been produced primarily in the United States (and had been even prior to his departure from Cuba).

Some of his most well-known plays include Los tres cerditos y el lobo carnicero, the aforementioned La vuelta a la manzana, and El banquete. His unpublished work was destroyed during his time in prison, but he continued his creative pursuits until his death in California in 1994.

== Works or publications ==
- Cuentos breves y brevísimos. Miami: Ediciones universal. 1997. ISBN 0897297288. OCLC 39703235.
- Escrito hasta en los bordes. San Francisco: Ibarra Bros. 1993. OCLC 29856062.
- La vuelta a la manzana. Havana: Unión Nacional de Escritores y Artistas de Cuba. 1968. OCLC 2102839.
- Pequeña antología. San Francisco: Public House. 1991. OCLC 41980259.
- Regreso de Alicia al pais de las maravillas. Miami: Ediciones Universal. 1994. ISBN 0897297288. OCLC 83296143.
