= Amilkar Ariza =

Colombian artist

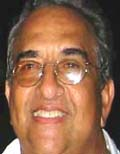
- Colombian artist and sculptor, Amilkar Ariza.
- Born: 1943 (age 82–83); Riohacha, Guajira, Colombia
- Known for: Painting; Sculpting

Amilkar Ariza (born 1943 in Riohacha, Guajira, Colombia) is a painter and sculptor.

== Art works ==
=== Sculptures ===
Ariza has created a collection of bronze sculptures, which have become his specialty, in which he aims to capture and illustrate the expressions and movements of the human body.

The series "The Golfers", inspired by the artist's passion for golf, consists of 10 bronze sculptures that try to capture the attention by transforming them emotionally into the actual experience of the game. A fan of many sports, Ariza has created another limited series of bronzes featuring baseball, basketball and tennis. His works featuring the movements of baseball include a life-size bronze sculpture of Major League Baseball catcher Iván Rodríguez in Miami, Florida.

Another example of Ariza's work is a limited series of 10 bronze sculptures called "Las Marias", depicting a woman's different expressions and sensibilities.

Ariza has also created monumental bronze sculptures, the most important of which is a 22 feet (6.7 m) monument to Colombian soccer player Carlos "El Pibe" Valderrama showing him in one of his most characteristic movements. The sculpture was placed in front of Valderrama's home town, Santa Marta, northern Colombia.

In March 2010 Amilkar Ariza revealed his more recent work, the monumental sculpture of "La Pilonera", a woman dancing the traditional "El Pilon" dance from Colombia's northern (Caribbean) coast. The monument portrays Consuelo Araújo Noguera, former head of the Ministry of Cultural Affairs in Colombia, who was killed by the FARC guerrilla during a rescue attempt by the Colombian Army. Mrs. Araujo is well known as one of the founders of the Vallenato Festival held annually in Valledupar, Colombia.

=== Murals ===
During the last few years, Ariza has created "Sculptured Murals", three-dimensional murals.

=== Paintings ===
In the past two decades, Ariza has created a collection of oil paintings inspired by the life and struggles of the indigenous Indians from his native Colombia.

== Exhibitions ==
1. 1976 - Club Militar - Bogotá (Colombia)
2. 1978 - Banco Central Hipotecario (Unicentro - Bogotá) (Colombia)
3. 1978 - Gimaura Hotel- Riohacha (Colombia)
4. 1979 - Colombo Europeo Club- Bogotá (Colombia)
5. 1980 - San Diego Gallery- Bogotá (Colombia)
6. 1982 - Casa de la Cultura - Valledupar (Colombia)
7. 1983 - Amilkar Ariza gallery inauguration- Bogotá (Colombia)
8. 1984 - Las Delicias Hotel- Riohacha (Colombia)
9. 1985 - Tequendama Hotel- Bogotá (Colombia) (Gold collection presentation)
10. 1986 - Instituto Colombiano de Bienestar familiar - Bogotá (Colombia)
11. 1987 - Mural sculpture "La Fuerza de Mis Raices", 20 square meters Casa Amilkar Ariza - Bogotá (Colombia)
12. 1988 - Mural sculpture "Clamor de Justicia", 36 square meters Justice Palace - Riohacha (Colombia)
13. 1989 - Town Center - Bonaventure, Fort Lauderdale - Florida
14. 1990 - Casa de la Cultura - Barrancas, Guajira (Colombia) Individual exposition - Retrospective
15. 1990 - Museum house Amilkar Ariza inauguration- Bogotá (Colombia) Permanent exposition
16. 1992 - Mural sculpture "GENESIS", 10 square meters, Club Campestre la Sabana Cundinamarca (Colombia)
17. 1993 - Mural sculpture "La Fuerza del Desierto" Amilkar Ariza's central office - Bogotá (Colombia)
18. 1993 - Amilkar Ariza's central office inauguration, for permanent exhibition of his art.
19. 1996 - The Golfers Series, Club Campestre La Sabana.
20. 1998 - The Golfers Series II. Weston Hills Country Club. Fort Lauderdale, Florida (United States)
21. 1998 - Meizner Park. Boca Raton, Florida (USA)
22. 1998 - Worth Avenue. West Palm Beach, Florida. (USA)
23. 1999 - Doral - Ryder Open. Champions Club Pavilion. Miami, Florida (USA)
24. 1999 - Doral Resort & Spa. Permanent Exposition. Miami, Florida.(USA)
25. 2000 - Bal Harbour Gallery. Miami, Florida (USA)
26. 2001 - Permanent Exhibition (Artist Museum)
27. 2002 - Monument Pibe Valderrama. Santa Marta, Colombia.
28. 2004 - Yahoo Cultural Gallery. San Francisco, California. (USA)
29. 2010 - Monument "La Pilonera Mayor" - Consuelo Araújo Noguera. Valledupar, Colombia
