= La Gaceta (Spain) =

Spanish newspaper

La Gaceta (La Gaceta de los Negocios)
- Type: Daily newspaper
- Format: Tabloid
- Owner: Grupo Intereconomia
- Founder: Jose Antonio Martinez Soler
- Founded: March 1989, as La Gaceta de los Negocios
- Political alignment: Right-wing; Conservative; Economic liberal
- Language: Spanish
- Headquarters: Madrid
- Website: gaceta.es

La Gaceta (Spanish for "The Gazette", full name La Gaceta de los Negocios, "The Business Gazette") is an online newspaper belonging to the Intereconomia Group which is conservative and supportive of market liberalism.

== History and profile ==
The newspaper was established as La Gaceta de los Negocios in March 1989. It was part of Grupo Zeta in the 1990s. In 1994 the paper had a circulation of 17,736 copies.

The paper previously belonged to Grupo Negocios until August 2009 when it was bought by Intereconomia Group. On 21 October 2009, the newspaper was relaunched nationally under the name La Gaceta. Following the transaction it also changed from a pure business focus, becoming a general newspaper. It sold out on its first day, selling 100,000 copies.

Its headquarters are in Madrid and it had branches in Barcelona, Bilbao, Valencia, and Valladolid. Conservative and economically liberal, La Gaceta positioned itself as the leading representative of Spanish conservatism and traditionalism. It took strong stances against abortion and same-sex marriage and heavily criticized the Socialist government of 2004-2011.

In December 2013 the paper ceased print publication. It continues to publish online.

== See also ==
- Spanish newspapers
- Intereconomía TV
