= Aziza Ali =

Singaporean chef

- Occupations: Chef, Food consultant, Businessperson, Artist, Jeweller, & Author

Aziza Ali is a Singaporean former chef, food consultant, businessperson, artist, jeweller, and author. She is recognised with opening Singapore's first Malay restaurant, as well as bringing fine Malay dining to the Singaporean public.

== Early life ==
The second of eight children, Aziza grew up in a kampung situated in Radin Mas, Singapore. Her father, a draughtsman, was a member of the Colombo Plan. Her mother, a housewife, was well-skilled in cooking and Aziza was taught the trade in her childhood. Her sister, Faridah Ali Chang, is now a psychologist. Aziza was educated at CHIJ Saint Theresa's Convent. After sitting for her GCE Ordinary Level examinations, she briefly worked as a relief teacher, a clerk, and a broker, before establishing Aziza's, a fine-dining restaurant serving Malay food, which was described as "unheard of" during the time. Aziza's "took Malay food to an international level", according to former The Straits Times food writer Violet Oon.

== Career ==
Cited to be the best known Malay restaurant in Singapore, Aziza's was originally an unfurnished shophouse at 36 Emerald Hill Road before Aziza purchased it in 1978 for S$150,000. Aziza's opened in 1979, becoming Singapore's first Malay restaurant. The restaurant is notable for having been patronised by Dione Warwick and James Ingram, as well as band Inner Circle, among others. Superstitious in nature, she would recite the Qur'an before opening time, as well as invite an imam to bless the restaurant regularly. Famous for its spicy beef rendang, it won the Singapore Tourism Board's Best Dining Experience Award in 1996.

Aziza's moved to Albert Court after being chased away by authorities in July 1995, after three lawsuits, in which Aziza won during the first two but ultimately lost in the third. Despite business being successful, Aziza was forced to close her restaurant following the 1997 Asian financial crisis, in 1998. Aziza then set up a food catering stall at Shaw Tower; it folded less than a year into business. Owing to her age, Aziza has declined offers to re-open Aziza's. She has appeared on television programmes to promote Malay food and has written one cookbook, titled Aziza's Creative Malay Cuisine, which was published in 2001. A self-taught artist, Aziza's artworks are priced at several thousand dollars; she has held two solo art exhibitions (2008 and 2010). Aziza also designs jewellery, which is then sold by her Emirati acquaintance. Aziza's 2013 memoir, titled Sambal Days, Kampong Cuisine, was released in March. It mainly discusses her childhood. She resides in Novena, Singapore.

The irrepressible Aziza Ali, a Malay Singaporean success story. Part I: Singapore's doyenne of Malay cuisine and fine dining

The irrepressible Aziza Ali, a Malay woman who succeeded in Singapore. Part II: Radin Mas, the village that nurtured her and a lost Malay world
