= Pozuel de Ariza =

Coordinates: 41°21′N 2°09′W

- municipality
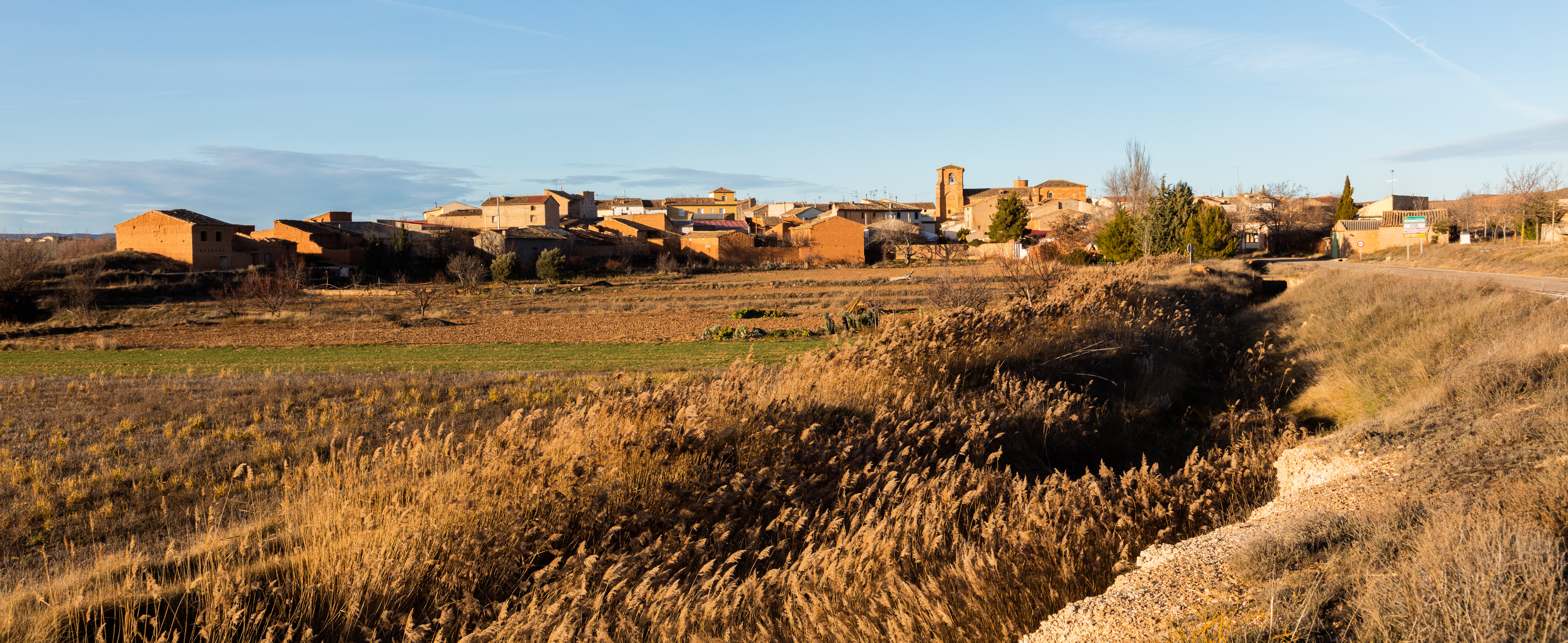

- Coat of arms
- Interactive map of Pozuel de Ariza
- Country: Spain
- Autonomous community: Aragon
- Province: Zaragoza

Area
  - Total: 22 km^{2} (8.5 sq mi)

Population (2025-01-01)
  - Total: 15
  - Density: 0.68/km^{2} (1.8/sq mi)
- Time zone: UTC+1 (CET)
  - Summer (DST): UTC+2 (CEST)

Pozuel de Ariza is a municipality located in the province of Zaragoza, Aragon, Spain. According to the 2004 census (INE), the municipality has a population of 27 inhabitants.

== See also ==
- List of municipalities in Zaragoza
