= Boulenouar =

Coordinates: 21.2944°N 16.5289°W

Boulenoir بولنوار
- Commune and town
- Interactive map of Boulenoir
- Country: Mauritania
- Region: Dakhlet Nouadhibou
- Department: Nouadhibou (department)

Area
  - Total: 3,831 sq mi (9,922 km^{2})

Population (2023 census)
  - Total: 3,369
  - Density: 0.8794/sq mi (0.3395/km^{2})
- Time zone: UTC±00:00 (GMT)

Boulenouar (Arabic: بولنوار, sometimes spelled Boulenoir) is a town and commune in Mauritania, situated on the railway line from Nouadhibou to Zouerate and on the road between Nouadhibou and Nouakchott.

Its main resource is water, which is close to the surface. The water is bottled and sold and also used as water supply for Nouadhibou. In the 2013 census, the population numbered 2,619. In the 2023 census, the population numbered 3,369.

Boulenouar is home to the Boulenouar Wind Power Station that is planned to be the biggest wind power station in Mauritania.
