= Nihm district =

Coordinates: 15°45′N 44°30′E

Nihm District مديرية نهم
- District
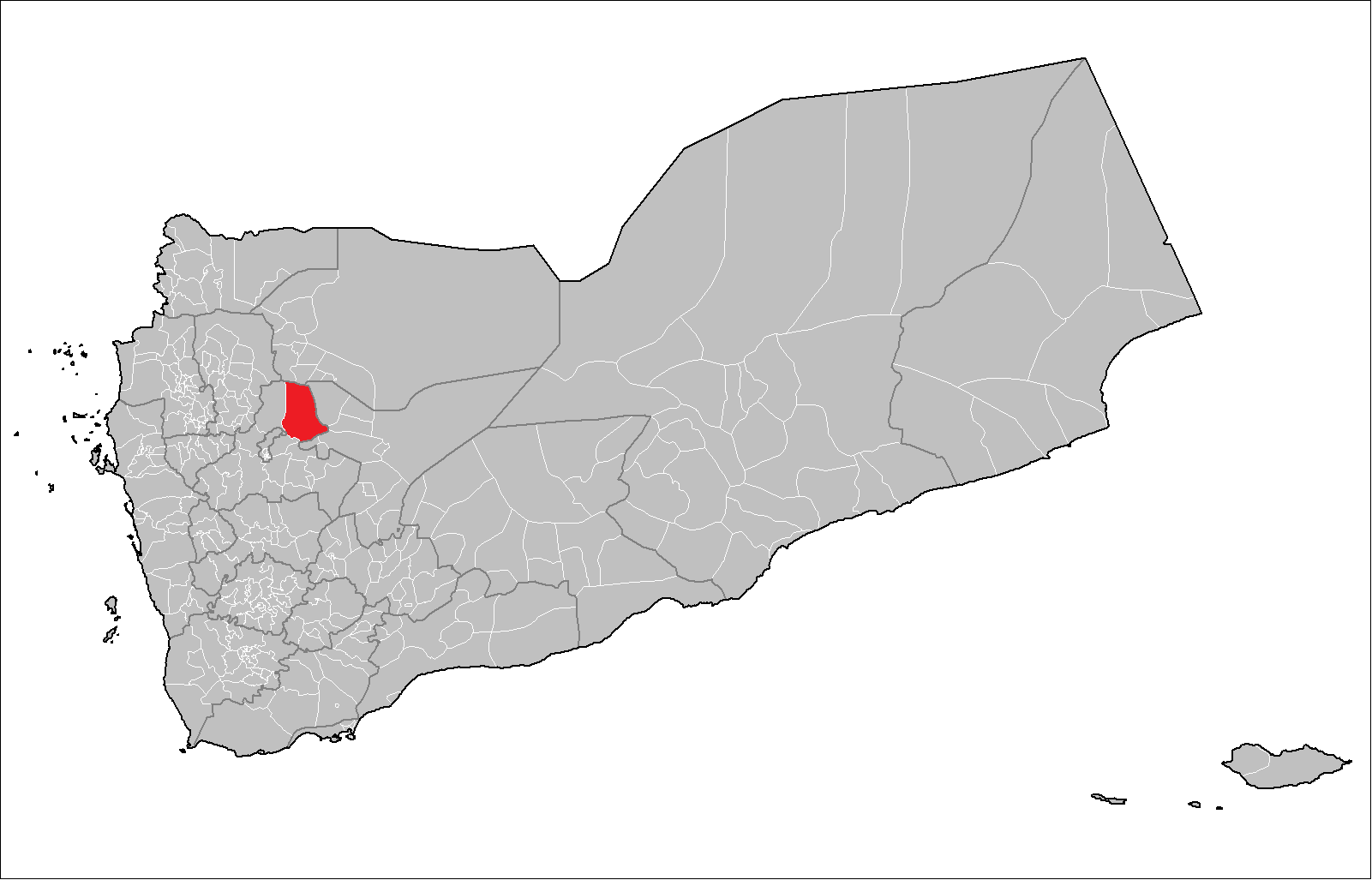
- Country: Yemen
- Governorate: Sana'a

Population (2003)
  - Total: 41,502
- Time zone: UTC+3 (Yemen Standard Time)

Nihm District (Arabic: مديرية نهم) is a district of the Sana'a Governorate, Yemen. As of 2003, the district had a population of 41,502 inhabitants.

== Climate ==
Climate data for Nihm
Month	Jan	Feb	Mar	Apr	May	Jun	Jul	Aug	Sep	Oct	Nov	Dec	Year
Mean daily maximum °C (°F)	21.6 (70.9)	23.2 (73.8)	24.5 (76.1)	24.7 (76.5)	25.6 (78.1)	27.6 (81.7)	26.5 (79.7)	25.8 (78.4)	24.9 (76.8)	21.9 (71.4)	19.1 (66.4)	21.1 (70.0)	23.9 (75.0)
Daily mean °C (°F)	12.4 (54.3)	13.3 (55.9)	16.1 (61.0)	16.8 (62.2)	18.2 (64.8)	19.1 (66.4)	19.8 (67.6)	19.1 (66.4)	18 (64)	14.5 (58.1)	11.4 (52.5)	12.4 (54.3)	15.9 (60.6)
Mean daily minimum °C (°F)	3.3 (37.9)	3.5 (38.3)	7.7 (45.9)	8.9 (48.0)	10.8 (51.4)	10.7 (51.3)	13.1 (55.6)	12.5 (54.5)	11.1 (52.0)	7.2 (45.0)	3.8 (38.8)	3.7 (38.7)	8.0 (46.5)
Average rainfall mm (inches)	7 (0.3)	2 (0.1)	9 (0.4)	33 (1.3)	38 (1.5)	3 (0.1)	42 (1.7)	58 (2.3)	5 (0.2)	0 (0)	6 (0.2)	8 (0.3)	211 (8.4)
Source: Climate-Data.org
