= History of D.C. United =

This article documents the history of D.C. United, an American soccer club based in Washington, D.C. For a general overview of the club, see D.C. United.

The club's roots trace back to FIFA awarding its quadrennial tournament, the FIFA World Cup to the United States in 1989, specifically for the 1994 FIFA World Cup. As part of receiving the hosting rights, the United States Soccer Federation had promised FIFA it would have a fully-professional first division soccer league sanctioned by the end of the century. In December 1993, Major League Soccer was founded with the anticipated goal of beginning play in 1996. In June 1994, Washington, D.C. was selected as one of the eight original cities to host an MLS franchise, and the first franchise to be announced by MLS. The club's name, colors, and logo were announced in New York City in October 1995. It was also announced that United would begin play at RFK Stadium located in the city's seventh ward near the Eastland Gardens neighborhood and D.C. Armory. The stadium would remain the club's home venue until moving to their current home, the soccer-specific, Audi Field in 2018.

The club hired played its first match in April 1996 against the then-called San Jose Clash. They would proceed to win three of the first MLS Cup championships. Additionally, during this period from 1996 until 1999, the club would win the Supporters Shield (league regular season champion) twice, the U.S. Open Cup (domestic knockout cup) once, the CONCACAF Champions' Cup (continental championship) once, and the now-defunct Copa Interamericana (intercontinental championship) once. For this run of success the club was often regarded as the league's "flagship franchise" early on and was seen The late 199 were seen as a dynasty era for United.

D.C. United was the first franchise awarded by MLS, and was the dominant team in MLS during the league's first few years of existence. For those reasons, United is often regarded as MLS's "flagship franchise". As of 2013, the club has won four regular season and league championships, more than any other sports franchise in the Washington area. The team has also won three U.S. Open Cup titles and a CONCACAF title.

== History of professional soccer in Washington, D.C. ==
The Washington Diplomats played in the North American Soccer League and American Soccer League from 1974 until 1991, and won one title, the ASL Championship in 1988. For a majority of the franchise's season, the Diplomats played at RFK Stadium, but some of their matches were played at W.T. Woodson High School in nearby Fairfax, Virginia.

== Early years (1995–1999) ==
=== Introduction ===
Prior to the 1994 FIFA World Cup, the United States Soccer Federation fulfilled promises to FIFA by aiding in the foundation of a new professional soccer league. On June 15, 1994, Major League Soccer selected Washington, D.C. out of twenty-two applicants to host one of the first seven franchises, with three more to be added before the league's launch. Once an MLS franchise was awarded to Washington, new management had to name it. In keeping with sports naming conventions in the United States, the earliest efforts entailed the area's name followed by a mascot. Some ideas included the "Spies", "Americans" and "Eagles". Eventually, however, the new team's operators decided simply to name the team "D.C. United". The name "United" alluded to well-known European club names such as Leeds and Manchester United, and reflected the team's location in the capital of the United States.

The team's colors and original logo, along with those of the other nine original teams, were announced on October 17, 1995, during a presentation in New York City. Black and white are D.C. United's primary colors, though the team's nickname is the "Black-and-Red." Red is used to accent the home jersey while white is the main color of the team's away kit. Three stripes along the shoulder, in white at home and black on the road (and originally on the front of the shirt itself), do not represent the three jurisdictions of the Washington Metropolitan Area Washington, D.C., Virginia, and Maryland, but reflect that the team's kits are made by Adidas. The team's shirt sponsor is Leidos. In 2011, the team introduced a predominantly red third kit with black accents to be worn four or more times in the season. The team has also previously used white away uniforms with red stripes. White and red are the colors of the flag of Washington, D.C., and the stripes are also reminiscent of those used on the flag. Goalkeepers usually distinguish themselves with a red or green colored shirt.

The team's original shield was implemented in 1996 consisting of the team's name, D.C. United, above a black bald eagle facing right on a red field, clutching in its talons three soccer balls overlaid on three white stars. The three stars and balls were again intended to represent the region's three jurisdictions. The eagle – the national bird of the United States – symbolizes many of the attributes of the team, including speed and power. This original logo was redesigned before the 1998 season. The current design reoriented the eagle facing left, and removed the three stars below it, whose metaphor was retained by three raised wing feathers. At the center of the eagle is a single gold colored star and soccer ball, which represents the team's victory in Major League Soccer's inaugural cup in 1996. The logo can also be adorned with four gold stars above it, representing the MLS Cups the team has won.

=== Immediate success (1996–99) ===
==== 1996 ====
D.C. United played its first MLS match on April 6, 1996, against the San Jose Clash (now Earthquakes). In this first game, the score remained tied at 0–0 until the last minutes of regulation time, when San Jose's attacker, Eric Wynalda, scored the first goal in league history and sent United to its first defeat. D.C. United lost its next three games and soon found itself in last place in both the Eastern Division and in the overall standings.

United managed, however, to turn its fortunes and qualify for the playoffs with an even 16–16 record. The team entered the playoffs with considerable momentum, and managed to win the Eastern Conference title with an upset win over Supporters' Shield winners, Tampa Bay Mutiny. In the inaugural MLS Cup championship match, United took on the Western Conference champions, Los Angeles Galaxy. In the championship match, United fell to an early 0–2 deficit, but regained form in the second half, where United rallied for a 3–2 golden goal victory and the championship. Additionally, United became the first sports team in the Washington, D.C. area in four years to win a league championship. United thereafter accomplished a "double", by adding the domestic (U.S. Open Cup) championship with a 3–0 victory over Rochester. The crowd of 8,000 at hand to see the Open Cup final would not be exceeded until 2009, when United itself hosted the Open Cup against Seattle. United's double was the first time a professional American soccer club won both the league and domestic championship since the New Bedford Whalers did so in 1932.

==== 1997 ====
In 1997, the club's success was highlighted by winning both the MLS Cup and Supporters' Shield, which has been accomplished only five times in league history. The team's second year saw United compete, in addition to Major League Soccer, in the U.S. Open Cup and the CONCACAF Champions' Cup.

On August 12, 1997, United would play their first international opponent, Trinidad and Tobago's United Petrotrin in the CONCACAF quarterfinals. There, an 84th-minute goal from Marco Etcheverry gave the club the 1–0 win, and a spot in the CONCACAF semifinals, where United would face a familiar foe, Los Angeles Galaxy. Played once again at Washington, D.C.'s RFK Stadium, the Galaxy's Cobi Jones netted once in the 10th minute of play, giving the visitors the advantage. Jones' goal, would be the decisive factor in the match, as United fell in the semifinals, and would play Mexico's Guadalajara in the consolation match. The third place game, ended in a 2–2 draw between the clubs, and third place was shared.

==== 1998 ====
By winning the 1997 MLS Cup, D.C. United earned its second consecutive berth into the CONCACAF Champions' Cup. In 1998, the tournament was held mid-season in the United States, and the club made it a priority to earn a North American title. Following a lopsided quarterfinal 8–0 victory over Trindiadian side Joe Public, United earned a semifinal matchup against the 1997 Mexican Invierno champions, León, ultimately defeating Club Leon 2–0 on goals by Roy Lassiter.

In the 1998 final, United went up against Deportivo Toluca, the 1998 Mexican Vernao champions. In front of a crowd of 12,607 a 41st-minute goal from United's Eddie Pope gave United its first, and to date, their only CONCACAF title. United became the first sports franchise in the Washington, D.C. metropolitan area to earn a continental honor, and the first American and MLS club to win a CONCACAF title. To this date, United is one of only two American soccer clubs to have won any CONCACAF club title.

United's continental success culminated in the 1998 Copa Interamericana, a now-defunct playoff series between the CONCACAF and CONMEBOL champions to determine the best soccer club in The Americas. As winners of 1998 Champions' Cup, United earned a berth into the series to take on Vasco da Gama of Brazil. In the first leg of the series, played at RFK Stadium, Vasco da Gama earned a 1–0 lead in the series. The return match, played in December 1998 was held at Lockhart Stadium in Fort Lauderdale, Florida. In the match, United earned a 2–0 win and the 2–1 advantage in aggregates to win the series and the final Interamericana title.

Despite two major continental titles in 1998, United failed to win an MLS trophy for the first time. Finishing with the second best regular season record, United fell 10 points shy of Los Angeles Galaxy in the competition for best record. United earned its way into the 1998 MLS Cup final through a shoot-out over Miami Fusion in the Eastern Conference semifinals, and a 2–1 series victory over Columbus Crew, for United's third consecutive Eastern Conference championship. Taking on upstart expansion side, Chicago Fire, United were shut out for a 0–2 loss against the Fire for the team's first MLS Cup loss.

==== 1999 ====
Bruce Arena had been D.C. United's coach from the beginning, but in October 1998, Arena left the team to direct the U.S. men's national team. To replace Arena, United turned to Thomas Rongen, who had won Coach of the Year honors as head of the Tampa Bay Mutiny in MLS's inaugural season. Rongen guided United to another successful season, and victory in the 1999 MLS Cup in Foxboro, Massachusetts.

== Rebuilding (2000–03) ==
Although it was not apparent at the time, Arena's departure marked the beginning of a downturn in the team's fortunes. While the club again won the MLS Cup in 1999 under coach Thomas Rongen, following the 1999 Major League Soccer season, the league substantially revised its rules regarding the structural format of the league, including the salary cap. The club was forced to release several key players so to come within the salary cap, and replaced them with younger, less expensive players. This "new look" United was the first D.C. United squad to fail to reach the MLS Cup and indeed failed to reach the playoffs altogether. D.C. United finished the 2000 MLS season with a record of 8–6–18 (W-T-L), second worst in the league.

In 2001 (a season that suffered, the team's 8–2–16 record consigned the team to a last place finish in the East. Following two disappointing seasons, the organization fired Rongen and hired former Miami Fusion head coach, Ray Hudson, who had become available when the Fusion was disbanded following contraction by MLS. Hudson had led the Fusion to a league best 16–5–5 record, winning the MLS Supporters' Shield. Despite his pedigree, however, Hudson failed to make a substantial impact with D.C. United in his first year of managing. In Hudson's debut year of 2002, United finished last in the Eastern Conference for the third consecutive year. In 2003, D.C. United ended its three-year playoff drought, but the team was eliminated in the conference semifinals by the Chicago Fire 4–0 on aggregate.

Despite the playoff berth, Hudson was fired following the 2003 season. Polish soccer player and manager Piotr Nowak replaced him before the start of the 2004 season.

== Second golden age, Nowak years (2004–07) ==
=== Fourth MLS Cup ===
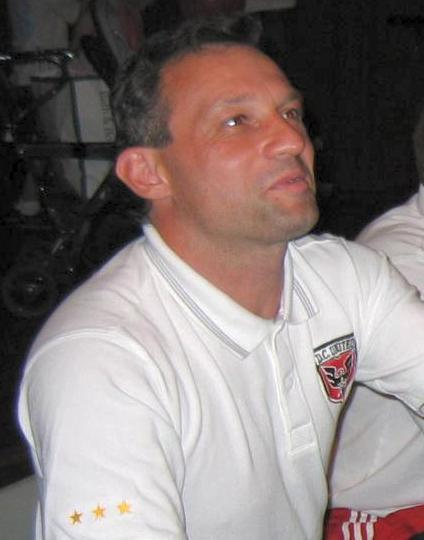
Under the helm of Piotr Nowak, D.C. United earned an MLS Cup and MLS Supporters Shield honors in 2004 and 2006, respectively.

The years under Piotr Nowak and the early years under Tom Sohen's coaching were seen as the strongest for United since their late 1990s dominance in the league. Highlighted with an MLS Cup title, two Supporters' Shields, and an Open Cup title, United nearly doubled their trophy case in the span of four years.

February 18, 2004; Nowak took the helm of head coach for United following the firing of Ray Hudson. The year was also marked by the arrival of up and coming teen prodigy Freddy Adu who, at the time, was only 14 years old. His professional contract with United made Adu the youngest pro athlete signed to an American sports league since 1887. The arrival of the prospect received major national headlines, and record crowds to United matches both at home and on the road. One match, resulted in a sellout of crowd upwards of 46,000 spectators; the fourth largest in United history.

The club's first season under Nowak was marred by injuries in the early going, and some players complained about Nowak's methods. Nevertheless, a strong finish, assisted in large measure by the late-season acquisition of Argentine midfielder Christian Gómez, propelled United into the 2004 playoffs as the second seed. There the team advanced past the New England Revolution on penalty kicks in what has been called one of the best games in MLS history. United then defeated the Kansas City Wizards to take their fourth MLS Cup.

While United struggled at first with consistency, the club defied expectations of a poor season and finished third place overall and second in the Eastern Conference. The record was good enough for a second seed in the 2004 MLS Cup Playoffs. In the Eastern Conference championship, the second seed United hosted fourth seed New England in a match that has been deemed as the greatest match in MLS history. In front of 21,000 spectators; United and the Revolution battled to a 3–3 draw during regulation time, thanks to a last gasp equalizer from New England's Pat Noonan. Still leveled at three-apiece, the match had to go into penalty kicks. The first takers, New England's Steve Ralston and D.C.'s Ben Olsen both missed their penalties, while the next two; Matt Reis and Santino Quaranta successfully converted their penalties. The third kick-takers, Taylor Twellman and Freddy Adu both nailed their shots. Things got interesting in the fourth and fifth rounds, where New England had their shot saved, while D.C.'s hit the crossbar. The series had to go to sudden death penalty kicks, where New England's Clint Dempsey missed his, whereas United's Brian Carroll successfully converted his. Followed by huge uproar and the club storming the field, it was the first time in five years United returned to the MLS Cup championship.

In MLS Cup 2004, United took on the Western Conference regular season and postseason champions, Kansas City Wizards. The Wizards, were coming off a 2–0 victory against the Los Angeles Galaxy in the Western Conference finals, to advance to the championship match. The 2004 final received additional hype around United making their first MLS Cup finals appearance in five years, as well as the prospect of Adu playing in his first major cup final. For Kansas City, it was their first trip to the final in four years, having won MLS Cup 2000 previously. For the Wizards, the team started on better ground as Wizards midfielder, Jose Burciaga Jr. drilled a 25-yard shot into the back of the net, giving the Wizards a 1–0 advantage only six minutes into the match. United quickly responded as the Black-and-Red scored thrice within seven minutes, starting with a 19th and 23rd minute pair of goals from Alecko Eskandarian preluding to Wizards defender, Alexandru Zotincă conceding an own goal in the 26th minute. The quick turn of events, according to analysis, shell shocked Kansas City. With a 3–1 lead going into the half, United looked poised to earn their fourth MLS championship, only to have that hope speculated in the 58th minute. During that moment, United defensive midfielder Dema Kovalenko drew a penalty kick for Kansas City and consequently earned a red card ejection from the match. With the ejection, Kovalenko infamously became the first MLS player to be ejected from an MLS Cup final in league history. To this date, no other player in MLS Cup history had been ejected from the championship. Thus allowed Wizards striker, Josh Wolff to convert a penalty to move the match within a goal. Subsequently, United's Eskandarian was substituted out for Adu, who made his appearance in the 65th minute. Adu was praised for a solid final 25 minutes in which he went on numerous runs deep down the Wizards' back third of the field. In spite of Adu's offensive spark, the shorthanded United had to spend a majority of the final 20 minutes continuously defending off the Wizards, who continuously pressured the back line wave after wave of attacks. However, United were able to veer off wave after wave of Wizards attack to earn their fourth ever MLS Cup title.

=== Consecutive shields ===
Following D.C. United's success in earning the 2004 MLS Cup title, the club went on a run in which has been credited as a "second golden age" for United. Between 2005 and 2008, United nearly doubled their trophy case by earning a U.S. Open Cup title in 2008 as well as two Supporters Shields during the three-year span. Most notably, United became the first MLS club to consecutively win the Supporters Shield, in which they won the regular season honor in both 2006 and 2007. The two Shields gave United berths into the 2007 and 2008 editions of the CONCACAF Champions' Cup in which the Black-and-Red made two semifinal runs.

The 2006 campaign was among United's best regular season performances in club history, tallying a league-best 52 goals while conceding only 38 goals, the second-fewest in the league. By the end of the regular season, United bested FC Dallas in the Supporters' Shield race, earning a total of 55 points off of a 15–7–10 record, ahead of Dallas' 52 points. Off the pitch, an attempt to sell the franchise fell through, while other clubs found owners, such as their Atlantic Cup rivals, the MetroStars being sold to Red Bull and being rebranded as New York Red Bulls.

== Underachievement (2008–2011) ==
=== Domestic glory, playoff and continental misfortune ===
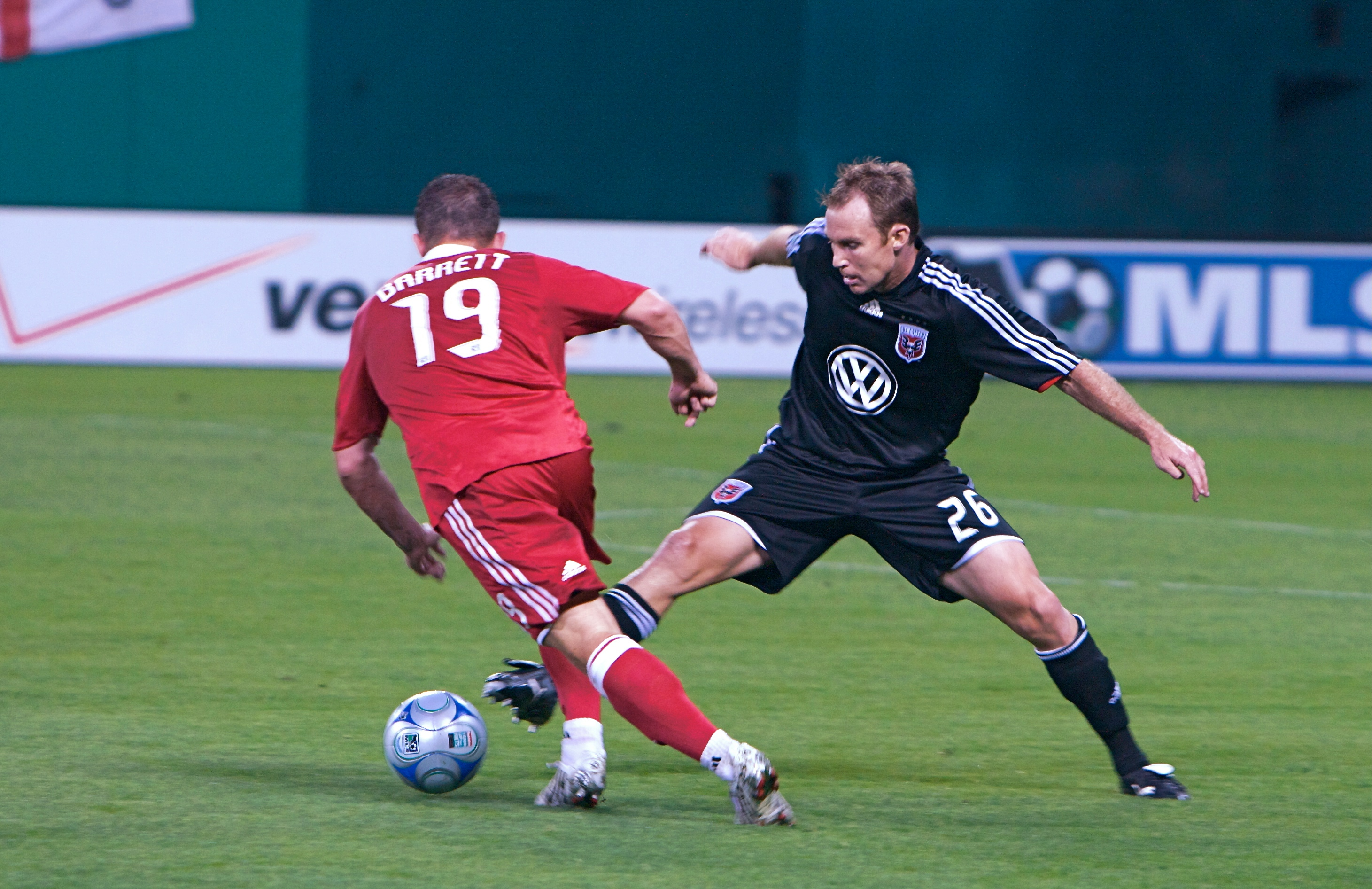

To fans and the media alike, 2008 marked a downfall for the franchise, as well as end to what was considered a "second golden age" for the club in league play. The justification behind this involved United's inability to defend the Supporters' Shield, an awarded given to the MLS club with the best regular season record, for a third-consecutive year. Additionally, the club failed to qualify for the playoffs for the first time since 2002, finishing sixth in the Eastern Conference and 10th in the overall table. The poorer record marked the team's lowest positioning in the league table in nearly five years.

Their performance league play reflected on the continental stage as well. Finishing as the 2007 MLS Supporters' Shield winners, United qualified for the inaugural CONCACAF Champions League, an international club tournament featuring the league, domestic and playoff champions from CONCACAF nations, pertaining to North and Central America, as well as the Caribbean. The tournament replaced the obsolete CONCACAF Champions' Cup, and was similarly modeled after its cousin tournament, the UEFA Champions League. In the Champions League, United continued their misfortunes, losing all their Group Stage matches at home, and only managing to pick up one draw at Costa Rica's Saprissa. United finished in the bottom of Group C, with a record of 0–1–5 (W-T-L).

Despite poor performance in MLS and CONCACAF competitions, United excelled in the domestic cup competition, the U.S. Open Cup. During the 2008 Open Cup campaign, United won their first Open Cup title in 12 years defeating the Charleston Battery, 2–1. The domestic cup title was their first since their inaugural season. The U.S. Open Cup, a domestic cup tournament much similar to the FA Cup runs parallel to the regular seasons of all tiers of professional and amateur soccer in the United States. The tournament is open for entry for any soccer club, professional or amateur, that is affiliated with the United States Soccer Federation. For MLS clubs, the top six American MLS clubs overall in the regular season are admitted entry into the third round proper, or round of 16, in the tournament. By finishing 1st overall in the regular season, United booked a third round entry in the tournament proper. The club opened Open Cup play with wins against Rochester Rhinos of the USL First Division (second tier) and New England Revolution of MLS (first tier) in the third round and quarterfinals respectively. In the semifinals, United won in extra time to defeat Chicago Fire. In the championship, United defeated Charleston Battery of the USL Second Division (third tier) to win the Open Cup for a second time in club history.

The 2009 season looked to be a stronger campaign for United, as the club held itself in a playoff position for a majority of MLS regular season play. Outside of the league, United made through the MLS qualification propers of the U.S. Open Cup to qualify for the main tournament proper. Once in the actual tournament, United reached the U.S. Open Cup final for the second consecutive year, and for the fourth time in their history. Hosting the Seattle Sounders FC, the match site was heavily criticized as to how U.S. Soccer determined the venue, which was kept private. The match, ended in a 2–1 victory for Seattle. Seattle's Fredy Montero and Roger Levesque scoring the team's two goals, while United's Clyde Simms scored a late-consolation goal. On-pitch controversy swirled around United goalkeeper, Josh Wicks who intentionally stomped on Montero's hand, after Montero scored the opening goal in the 67th minute. Two minutes later, Wicks was ejected from the match, causing United's Christian Gomez to sub out to be replaced by back-up keeper, Miloš Kocić. Following the match, U.S. Soccer suspended Wicks for five Open Cup matches.

By winning the 2008 U.S. Open Cup, United earned a berth into the 2009–10 CONCACAF Champions League. United fared better in their second Champions League journey, earning three wins, a draw and two losses. However, despite the winning record, United finished third in their group, narrowly missing out on the quarterfinals. Until the 2011–12 CONCACAF Champions League, United had the highest total number of points in Group Stage not to qualify for the knockout round of the Champions League.

=== 2010 ===
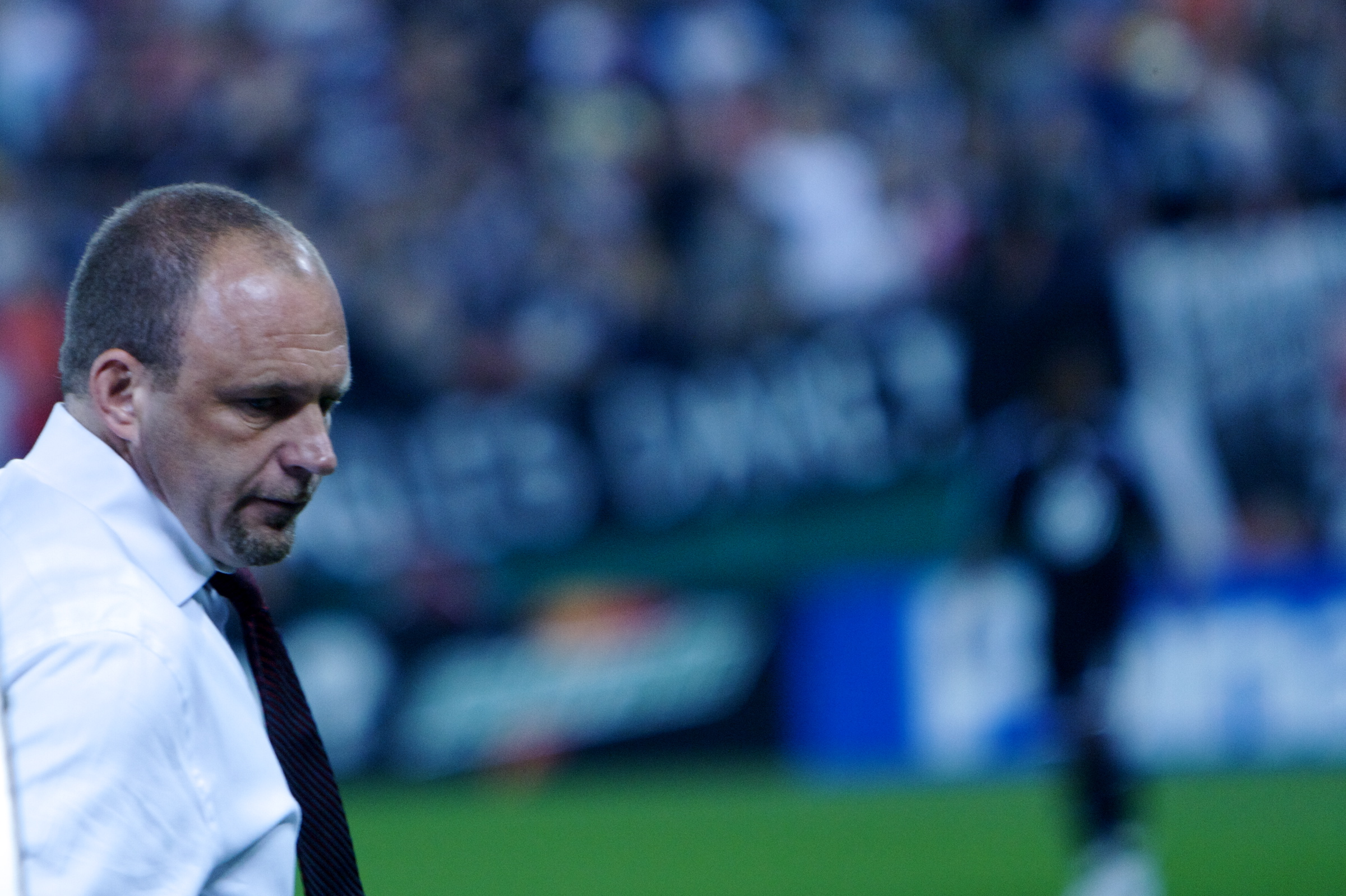

Following the club's failure to qualify for the MLS Cup Playoffs for two consecutive seasons, Tom Soehn resigned from the head coaching duties. Soehn became a director of soccer operations for the then-second tier club, Vancouver Whitecaps. D.C. United hired former Kansas City Wizards head coach, Curt Onalfo to replace Soehn. Onalfo, who had played for United in the 1990s, became the first former United player to be hired as a head coach. The recently retired Ben Olsen was hired as an assistant coach for Onalfo while Steve Sampson, who was an assistant to Soehn, remained on the coaching staff.

Onalfo's tenure was brief and unsuccessful. The 2010 season marked the poorest league finish for the club since 2002, and the worst regular season record in franchise history. The team managed to only win six regular season matches out of a possible 30, while losing 20 games and drawing four. United scored only 22 goals, the lowest team total in MLS regular season history, and the lowest offensive production since the Toronto FC in 2007. United's attendance fell to 14,500 fans a game. Onalfo was fired before the end of the season, on August 4, 2010, and the team assigned coaching duties to Ben Olsen on an interim basis. As interim manager, Olsen led the team to a 3–6–1 record during the final 10 games of the regular season.

Despite the team's poor regular season performance, the club had a strong run in the 2010 U.S. Open Cup, where they reached the semifinals before falling to eventual runners-up, Columbus Crew.

== Ben Olsen era (2012–2020) ==
Following 2010's poor showing, D.C. United undertook to overhaul the club's roster and management. The club signed interim manager Ben Olsen to a three-year contract, and released major signings such as Juan Manuel Pena and Jaime Moreno, both of whom opted for the MLS Re-Entry Draft. The club completed three major acquisitions during the offseason, first obtaining ex-Sporting Kansas City attacker Josh Wolff and Houston Dynamo striker Joseph Ngwenya in the MLS Re-Entry Draft and then in February 2011, following a lengthy trial, signing U.S. national team standout Charlie Davies on a season-long loan from French outfit Sochaux of the French Ligue 1.

=== 2012 ===
In summer 2012, Erick Thohir and Jason Levien, both at the time minority partners in the NBA's Philadelphia 76ers, joined club owner William Chang's ownership group. Their ambitions included expanding D.C. United's global reach as well as the prime goal, acquiring a soccer stadium for the team.

On October 21, 2012, D.C United defeated Columbus Crew at RFK, 3–2, and returned to the MLS Cup Playoffs for the first time in five years. The 3 goals that D.C.United scored against Columbus stood out in a 7-game undefeated streak, as the team closed out the regular season with 5 wins and 2 draws in their final 7 games. In their last 15 games, United scored more than 2 goals only once, in that playoff-clinching win over the Crew. In fact, that was the only game in the final six in which United scored more than one goal. After losing star player Dwayne De Rosario to a season-ending knee injury, coach Ben Olsen had implemented a strategy of playing a deliberately defensive shell and aiming for one clear chance in attack to win a game, tactics that came to be known as Bennyball.

In the playoffs, United defeated rival New York Red Bulls in the conference semifinals and proceeded to the Eastern Conference Finals, where they fell to the Houston Dynamo on a 4–2 aggregate score. The conference semifinals against New York were disrupted by Hurricane Sandy. The storm interrupted essential services in the New York / New Jersey area, making it impracticable to begin the two-game series in New York as scheduled. MLS, with United's concurrence, switched the order of the home-and-away games, moving the first game to Washington and thereby eliminating United's advantage, as the higher-seeded team, as host of the second and potentially deciding game. A snowstorm hit New York on the night of the rescheduled second match, and after ineffective snow removal, the match was postponed. The match finally took place the following night, with Nick Deleon finishing a through ball from Robbie Russell to seal victory for DC United.

On November 27, it was reported that president Kevin Payne was leaving the club he founded in order to take over operations at another MLS Club.

=== 2013 ===
D.C. United's surprising success in 2012 was followed by the worst season in club history, as the 2013 version of DC United set league records for futility, winning only 3 of regular-season 34 games and scoring even fewer goals per game than the previous MLS standard for offensive impotence, the 2010 D.C. United team. Despite the team's record-breaking awfulness in league play, D.C. United did win its first title since 2008, winning the 2013 U.S. Open Cup tournament, defeating Real Salt Lake 1–0 on a goal by Lewis Neal. That title meant that D.C. United would return to the CONCACAF Champions League in 2014, after a 5-year absence.

=== 2014 ===
Following the 2013 season, the team's roster once again underwent a major overhaul. The team traded the first 2014 MLS SuperDraft pick for the second position and selected Steve Birnbaum. The Re-Entry draft saw the return to the fold of Bobby Boswell, along with fellow free agents Sean Franklin and Fabian Espindola. Off-season trades also brought in veterans Davy Arnaud, Jeff Parke and Eddie Johnson, while a trade early in 2014 added another quality veteran in Chris Rolfe. While 2013 had brought the most precipitous one-season decline in MLS history, the 2014 D.C. United team managed the greatest turnaround in the other direction in league history. The team claimed the regular season Eastern Conference Championship, before falling to the New York Red Bulls in the playoffs. Coach Ben Olsen was named the MLS Coach of the Year and goalie Bill Hamid was given the award for the top goalkeeper in the league. The team also enjoyed great success in the 2014-15 CONCACAF Champions League, topping group play by winning all of its group games and earning the tournament's top seed for the quarterfinal round which would be played in February 2015.

2014 ended on a particularly high note for the franchise, as the District of Columbia government approved a plan to purchase land at Buzzard Point for a new stadium to be built and financed by the team and its ownership.

== Notable players ==
This list of former players includes those who received international caps while playing for the team, made significant contributions to the team in terms of appearances or goals while playing for the team, or who made significant contributions to the sport either before they played for the team, or after they left. Players in boldface are players who have been inducted into the Hall of Tradition.

Name	Nationality	Position	Years
Freddy Adu	(United States)	FW	2004–06
**Jeff Agoos**	(United States)	DF	1996–00
Ronald Cerritos	(El Salvador)	FW	2003–04
Bobby Convey	(United States)	MF	2000–04
**Raúl Díaz Arce**	(El Salvador)	MF	1996–97; 2000–01
Luciano Emilio	(Brazil)	FW	2006–09
Alecko Eskandarian	(United States)	FW	2003–06
**Marco Etcheverry**	(Bolivia)	MF	1996–03
Marcelo Gallardo	(Argentina)	MF	2008
Christian Gómez	(Argentina)	MF	2004–07; 2009
**John Harkes**	(United States)	MF	1996–98
Roy Lassiter	(United States)	FW	1998–99; 2002
Carlos Llamosa	(Colombia)	DF	1997–00
Jaime Moreno	(Bolivia)	FW	1996–02; 2004–10
Bryan Namoff	(United States)	DF / MF	2001–10
Ryan Nelsen	(New Zealand)	DF	2001–05
Ben Olsen	(United States)	MF	1998–09
**Eddie Pope**	(United States)	DF	1998–02
Tony Sanneh	(United States)	MF	1996–98
Earnie Stewart	(Netherlands)	MF	2003–04
Hristo Stoichkov	(Bulgaria)	FW	2003
Richie Williams	(United States)	MF	1996–00; 2002

== Honors ==
=== International ===
Copa Interamericana

- Winners (1): 1998

CONCACAF Champions League

- Winners (1): 1998
- Third Place (2): 1997, 1999

CONCACAF Giants Cup

- Runner-up (1): 2001

SuperLiga

- Semifinalist (1): 2007

=== Domestic ===
U.S. Open Cup

- Winner (3): 1996, 2008, 2013
- Runner-up (2): 1997, 2009

=== League ===
MLS Cup

- Winner (4): 1996, 1997, 1999, 2004
- Runner-up (1): 1998

MLS Supporters' Shield

- Winner (4): 1997, 1999, 2006, 2007
- Runner-up (1): 1998

MLS Eastern Conference

  - Winners (Regular Season) (6): 1997, 1998, 1999, 2006, 2007, 2014
  - Winners (Playoff) (5): 1996, 1997, 1998, 1999, 2004

=== Minor awards ===
Atlantic Cup

- Winner (11): 1996, 1998, 1999, 2002, 2004, 2005, 2006, 2007, 2008, 2009, 2012, 2014, 2016, 2021

Carolina Challenge Cup

- Winners (4): 2010, 2011, 2012, 2014

ATX Pro Challenge

- Winner (1): 2015

Capital Cup

- Winner (2): 2021, 2022

== See also ==
- Atlantic Cup – The name of United's longstanding rivalry against New York Red Bulls
- D.C. United
  - D.C. United Academy
  - D.C. United U-23
  - D.C. United Women
- D.C. United Hall of Tradition
- List of D.C. United head coaches
- List of D.C. United players
- List of D.C. United results by opponent
- List of D.C. United seasons
