= D.C. United Hall of Tradition =

Sports award

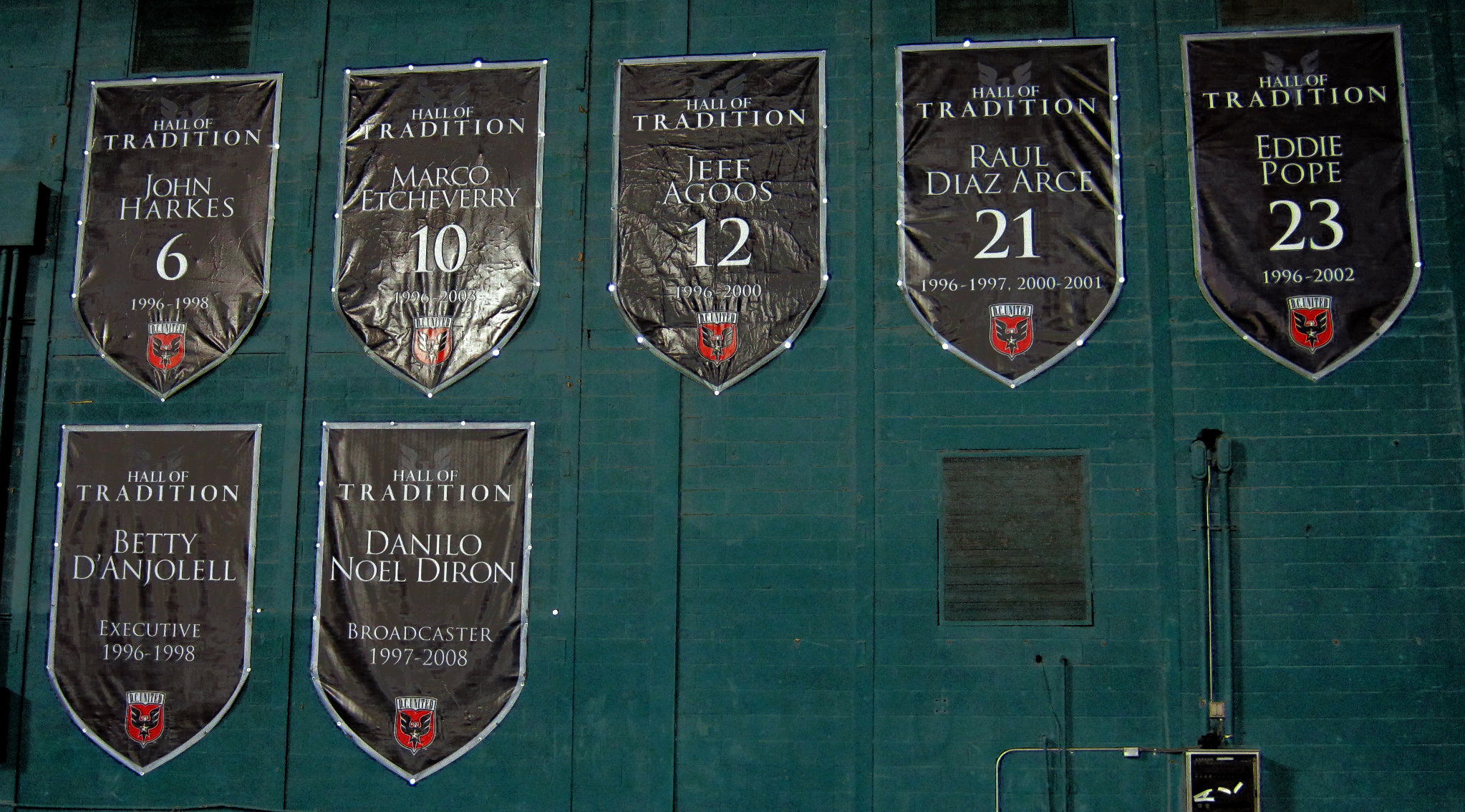
Banners for the "Hall of Tradition" members as displayed at RFK Stadium.

The D.C. United Hall of Tradition (formerly Tradition of Excellence) is an honor bestowed upon players, coaches and club management deemed by the franchise to have crucial to D.C. United's success.

Originally known as Tradition of Excellence, the honor was created in 2003 when the club honored midfielder John Harkes. Since 2007, six fellow players, executives and media partners have been honored by United.

The most recent inductee into the Hall of Tradition was United midfielder and current head coach, Ben Olsen was a member of the club during their late 1998 and 2009 dynasty, which included two MLS Cup honors, three MLS Supporter's Shields, a U.S. Open Cup and a CONCACAF title.

== Induction ceremony ==
On September 13, 2008, at halftime during a match against FC Dallas, D.C. United honored the 1998 squad that won the CONCACAF Champions' Cup including the two finalists for induction into the Hall; Richie Williams and Jeff Agoos. Agoos was inducted during a 2-1 playoff victory against the New England Revolution on December 16, 2008, after winning three MLS Cup titles during five seasons with D.C. United.

It is an honor and a privilege to join John and Marco in the D.C. United Hall of Tradition. It's a very special group. I was fortunate to be included on a team with great players in a quality organization and I want to thank all of the people involved.

— Jeff Agoos, Soccer Insider

Díaz Arce and Dirón became the fourth and fifth inductees during a halftime ceremony while D.C. United faced Seattle Sounders FC at RFK Stadium on September 12, 2009. Pope was inducted in the Hall at halftime ceremony during a 2–1 loss against the Los Angeles Galaxy on July 18, 2010.

=== 2011 induction ceremony ===
On June 13, 2011, D.C. United announced four nominees for the 2011 Hall of Tradition induction ceremony, including Roy Lassiter, Carlos Llamosa, John Maessner, and Richie Williams. On July 12, 2011, D.C. United announced that defensive midfielder Richie Williams would be inducted into the Hall of Tradition during a match against the Portland Timbers on August 27. Before the induction ceremony D.C. United President and CEO Kevin Payne recognized Williams' accomplishments:

Richie was a key member of the early D.C. United teams who set a standard for MLS, which remains unmatched. His intelligence and fiery determination on the field was a critical ingredient in our success. His work rate and understanding of the game allowed our more glamorous players to be successful, but his contributions were no less important to our many championships. It’s absolutely appropriate that Richie be inducted into the Hall of Tradition, alongside John Harkes, Marco Etcheverry, Jeff Agoos, Raul Diaz Arce and Eddie Pope.

Williams played for D.C. United six of his eight seasons in Major League Soccer. During his first five seasons with the club from 1996 until 2000 Williams helped the team win several titles, including the 1996, 1997, and 1999 MLS Cup titles; the 1996 U.S. Open Cup championship; the 1997 and 1999 Supporters Shields; and the 1998 Champions Cup and InterAmerican Cup victories. Williams played a final additional season with D.C. United in 2002.

=== 2013 induction ceremony ===
On September 14, 2013, Jaime Moreno was inducted into the Hall of Tradition at halftime of a match against the Los Angeles Galaxy at RFK Stadium. The ceremony was particularly poignant due to the presence of Galaxy coach Bruce Arena, who coached Moreno at DC United early in his career.

== List of members ==
Nat	Name	Type	Pos.	App.	G	Years	Inducted
(United States)	John Harkes	Player	Midfielder	83	14	1996–98	May 14, 2003
(Bolivia)	Marco Etcheverry	Player	Midfielder	190	34	1996–2003	October 20, 2007
(United States)	Betty D'Anjolell	Executive	N/A	N/A	N/A	1995–98	June 29, 2008
(United States)	Jeff Agoos	Player	Defender	158	7	1996–2000	October 16, 2008
(El Salvador)	Raúl Díaz Arce	Player	Forward	68	52	1996–97, 2000–01	September 12, 2009
(Uruguay)	Danilo Noel Dirón	Broadcaster	N/A	N/A	N/A	1997–2008	September 12, 2009
(United States)	Eddie Pope	Player	Defender	143	8	1996–02	July 18, 2010
(United States)	Richie Williams	Player	Midfielder	169	8	1996–2000, 2002	October 15, 2011
(United States)	Ben Olsen	Player	Midfielder	221	29	1998–2009	September 15, 2012
(Bolivia)	Jaime Moreno	Player	Forward	329	131	1996–2002, 2004–2010	September 14, 2013
(United States)	Kevin Payne	President/CEO	N/A	N/A	N/A	1994–2001, 2004–2012	October 2, 2015

== Members by position ==
Players only.

Position	Members
Midfielder	4
Defender	2
Forward	2
Goalkeeper	0

== Members by nationality ==
Nation	Members
United States	7
Bolivia	2
El Salvador	1
Uruguay	1

== See also ==
- D.C. United
- All-time D.C. United roster
- History of D.C. United
- List of D.C. United managers
