= 2011 National Soccer Hall of Fame Induction Class =

These are the results for the voting for the National Soccer Hall of Fame 2011 induction class. Cobi Jones, Eddie Pope and Earnie Stewart were selected for the Player category, Bruce Murray as a Veteran and Bob Gansler as a Builder.

The Hall of Fame inducts individuals in three categories, Player, Veteran and Builder. The Hall of Fame also selects individuals for special awards including the Colin Jose Media Award, Eddie Pearson Award and a Medal of Honor.

== Ceremony ==
The induction ceremony took place before an international friendly between the United States and Spain on June 4, 2011 at Gillette Stadium in Foxborough, Massachusetts. The five inductees were introduced on the field before a record crowd in Massachusetts along with current Hall of Fame members.

After the on-field presentation an induction ceremony was held in Gillette Stadium. Each player presented a story from his soccer experience. Pope recounted his first youth national team experience. Pope's coach at the University of North Carolina, Elmar Bolowich, set up an invitation to the national team training camp, which was run by head coach Bob Gansler. Despite a surprisingly poor initial performance, Gansler allowed Pope to attend a second camp.

Earnie Stewart's fear of flying was referenced in his introduction by teammate Claudio Reyna and Stewart's own address, in which he stated,

I’d like to thank [legendary Dutch coach] Rinus Michels. I was going to the airport and my fear of flying was terrible, so my wife dropped me off for a flight to California. I said to myself, ‘This is it, I’m quitting, I’m never going to play for the U.S. soccer team ever again.’ I told my wife to come pick up me because I’m hanging it up. All of a sudden, I saw Rinus Michels -- and I never got a chance to tell him — he was there. At that moment, I thought, ‘If such an important person is going to step on this plane, what can happen to me?’ I step on, I called my wife again and told her : ‘Forget what I said.’ I am so very glad I decided to do that because it's been a fantastic ride.

— Earnie Stewart,

Stewart continued by referencing his departure from D.C. United on somewhat rocky terms and later his continued commitment to the U.S. National Team, despite spending most of his life in the Netherlands.

== Player ==
To be eligible in this category, a player must have been retired for at least three full calendar years but no more than ten. The person must have also 1) played at least twenty full games for the United States or 2) at least five seasons in an American first-division league, being selected at least once as a league all star. Voting began on February 17, 2011 and ended on March 11, 2011. Any player who was named on at least 66.7% of the ballots cast was selected for induction. Any player who received less than 5% of the ballots was dropped from the Player eligibility list and will be placed on the Veterans eligibility list when they meet the criteria for that list. Those people eligible to vote for this category included all current and former coaches of the United States men's and women's national teams, active Major League Soccer and Women's Professional Soccer coaches with a minimum of four years tenure, select soccer administrators, designated members of the media and all Hall of Famers. Three individuals ran away with the voting: Cobi Jones, Eddie Pope and Earnie Stewart.

=== Voting results ===
Elected to the Hall of Fame:

- Cobi Jones
- Eddie Pope
- Earnie Stewart

87.13%
74.26%
71.29%

Not elected but remaining on future ballots:

- Marco Etcheverry
- Shannon MacMillan
- Joe-Max Moore
- Cindy Parlow
- Carlos Valderrama
- Peter Vermes
- Chris Armas

56.44%
54.46%
51.49%
43.56%
42.57%
38.61%
32.67%

=== Eligible players ===
The following individuals were also declared eligible for induction in 2010, but were not among those that got the top number of votes.

- Mike Burns
- Mauricio Cienfuegos
- Raúl Díaz Arce
- Robin Fraser
- Eduardo Hurtado
- Chris Henderson
- Jason Kreis
- Roy Lassiter
- Carlos Llamosa
- Victor Nogueira
- Piotr Nowak
- John O'Brien
- Tiffany Roberts
- Danielle Slaton
- Steve Trittschuh
- Tisha Venturini

== Veteran ==
Eligibility for Veterans is the same as for the Player category, but the individual must have been retired for at least ten years. The voting period was the same as for the Player category.

Elected to the Hall of Fame:

- Bruce Murray

58.14%

Not elected:

- Desmond Armstrong
- John Doyle
- Linda Hamilton
- Teófilo Cubillas
- Shep Messing
- Glenn Myernick
- George Best
- Bill McPherson
- Julio Cantillo

48.84%
48.84%
46.57%
44.19%
41.86%
41.86%
39.53%
18.60%
4.65%

== Builder ==
To be eligible, an individual must have had a major, sustained and positive impact on American soccer on a national or professional level for at least ten years and receive at least fifty percent of the votes cast. Only the person with the most votes is selected for induction.

Elected to the Hall of Fame:

- Bob Gansler

58.49%

Not elected:

- Tony DiCicco
- Chuck Blazer
- Sigi Schmid
- Robert Contiguglia
- Francisco Marcos
- Fritz Marth

56.60%
52.83%
50.94%
49.06%
41.51%
26.42%
