= D.C. United results by opponent =

All time records for D.C. United against opponents in distinct competitive matches.

== Table key ==
^{¤}	Team competes in Eastern Conference
*	Team competes in Western Conference

Win %	Denotes the percentage of total matches won against that team
First	Denotes the first season to include a match between D.C. United and that team

== Major League Soccer ==
=== Regular season ===
Club^{[A]}	P	W	D	L	Win %	First	Notes
Club^{[A]}	Total				Win %	First	Notes
Chicago Fire^{¤}	51	17	15	19	33.33	1997	^{[E]}
Columbus Crew^{¤}	58	25	9	24	43.10	1996	—
Miami Fusion^{¤}	4	2	1	1	50.00	1996	Defunct
CF Montreal^{¤}	10	5	3	2	50.00	2012	
New England Revolution^{¤}	64	29	9	26	45.31	1996	—
Red Bull New York^{¤}	75	39	11	25	52.00	1996	—
New York City FC^{¤}	0	0	0	0	—	2015	
Orlando City SC^{¤}	0	0	0	0	—	2015	
Philadelphia Union^{¤}	14	6	3	5	42.86	2010	^{[G]}
Tampa Bay Mutiny^{¤}	4	2	1	1	50.00	1996	Defunct
Toronto FC^{¤}	21	12	3	6	57.14	2009	^{[H]}
Chivas USA*	17	9	3	5	52.94	2005	Defunct
Colorado Rapids*	39	18	8	13	46.15	1996	—
FC Dallas*	41	15	8	18	36.59	1996	—
Houston Dynamo*	14	4	2	8	28.57	2006	^{[F]}
Los Angeles Galaxy*	41	13	9	19	31.71	1996	—
Portland Timbers*	5	1	2	2	20.00	2011	^{[C]}
Real Salt Lake*	18	7	4	7	38.89	2005	^{[B]}
San Jose Earthquakes*	35	13	6	16	37.14	1996	—
Seattle Sounders FC*	10	2	2	6	20.00	2009	^{[D]}
Sporting Kansas City*	51	20	11	20	39.22	1996	—
Vancouver Whitecaps FC*	5	1	2	2	20.00	2011	^{[C]}
Last updated March 6, 2015.

=== MLS Cup Playoffs ===
Club^{[A]}	P	W	D	L	P	W	D	L	P	W	D	L	Win %	First
Club^{[A]}	Home				Away				Total				Win %	First
Chicago Fire^{¤}	3	0	1	2	3	0	1	2	6	0	2	4	0.00	1998
Columbus Crew^{¤}	3	3	0	0	2	1	0	1	5	4	0	1	80.00	1997
Miami Fusion^{¤}	1	1	0	0	1	0	1	0	2	1	1	0	50.00	1998
CF Montreal^{¤}	0	0	0	0	0	0	0	0	0	0	0	0	—	—
New England Revolution^{¤}	3	1	1	1	1	0	1	0	4	1	2	1	25.00	1997
Red Bull New York^{¤}	6	5	1	0	5	2	2	1	11	7	3	1	63.64	1996
New York City FC^{¤}	0	0	0	0	0	0	0	0	0	0	0	0	—	
Orlando City SC^{¤}	0	0	0	0	0	0	0	0	0	0	0	0	—	
Philadelphia Union^{¤}	0	0	0	0	0	0	0	0	0	0	0	0	—	—
Tampa Bay Mutiny^{¤}	1	1	0	0	1	1	0	0	2	2	0	0	100.00	1996
Toronto FC^{¤}	0	0	0	0	0	0	0	0	0	0	0	0	—	—
Chivas USA*	0	0	0	0	0	0	0	0	0	0	0	0	—	—
Colorado Rapids*	1	1	0	0	0	0	0	0	1	1	0	0	100.00	1997
FC Dallas*	0	0	0	0	0	0	0	0	0	0	0	0	—	—
Houston Dynamo*	0	0	1	0	0	0	0	1	2	0	1	1	0.00	—
Los Angeles Galaxy*	1	1	0	0	1	1	0	0	2	2	0	0	100.00	1996
Portland Timbers*	0	0	0	0	0	0	0	0	0	0	0	0	—	—
Real Salt Lake*	0	0	0	0	0	0	0	0	0	0	0	0	—	—
San Jose Earthquakes*	0	0	0	0	0	0	0	0	0	0	0	0	—	—
Seattle Sounders FC*	0	0	0	0	0	0	0	0	0	0	0	0	—	—
Sporting Kansas City*	0	0	0	0	1	1	0	0	1	1	0	0	100.00	2004
Vancouver Whitecaps FC*	0	0	0	0	0	0	0	0	0	0	0	0	—	—
Last updated March 6, 2015. Source: D.C. United

== U.S. Open Cup ==
Similar to England's FA Cup, the U.S. Open Cup is the oldest soccer tournament in the United States. The first competition dates back to 1914. In the 1920s, professional American Soccer League clubs were allowed to play in the tournament, but following the folding of the original ASL, the Open Cup (then called the Challenge Cup) was only open to amateur clubs. It wasn't until 1995 that professional clubs were allowed to enter the competition.

Today, the competition is open to any American soccer club affiliated with the United States Soccer Federation. The United have participated in 14 Open Cups in their existence, winning the 1996 and 2008 editions of the tournament.

Club^{[I]}	P	W	D	L	P	W	D	L	P	W	D	L	Win %	First	Notes
Club^{[I]}	Home				Away				Total				Win %	First	Notes
(North Carolina) Carolina Dynamo	0	0	0	0	1	1	0	0	1	1	0	0	100.00	1996	—
(Texas) FC Dallas	4	3	1	0	1	0	0	1	5	3	1	1	60.00	1996	—
(New York (state)) Rochester Rhinos	4	4	0	0	1	0	0	1	5	4	0	1	80.00	1996	—
(Pennsylvania) Hershey Wildcats	1	1	0	0	1	1	0	0	2	2	0	0	100.00	1997	—
(Florida) Tampa Bay Mutiny	1	1	0	0	0	0	0	0	1	1	0	0	100.00	1997	—
(California) San Francisco Bay Seals	1	1	0	0	0	0	0	0	1	1	0	0	100.00	1997	—
(South Carolina) Charleston Battery	1	1	0	0	2	1	0	1	3	2	0	1	66.67	1999	—
(Florida) Miami Fusion	1	0	1	0	0	0	0	0	1	0	1	0	0.00	2000	—
(New Jersey) New Jersey Stallions	1	1	0	0	0	0	0	0	1	1	0	0	100.00	2001	—
(Massachusetts) New England Revolution	3	2	0	1	1	0	0	1	4	2	0	2	50.00	2001	—
(Pennsylvania) Pittsburgh Riverhounds	1	1	0	0	0	0	0	0	1	1	0	0	100.00	2003	—
Virginia Beach Mariners	1	1	0	0	0	0	0	0	1	1	0	0	100.00	2003	—
(North Carolina) Wilmington Hammerheads	0	0	0	0	1	1	0	0	1	1	0	0	100.00	2003	—
(New York (state)) Red Bull New York	2	2	0	0	1	0	0	1	3	2	0	1	66.67	2003	—
(Virginia) Richmond Kickers	1	1	0	0	3	3	0	0	4	4	0	0	100.00	2005	—
(Ohio) Columbus Crew	2	1	0	1	0	0	0	0	2	1	0	1	50.00	2006	—
(Illinois) Chicago Fire	1	1	0	0	2	1	0	1	3	2	0	1	66.67	2006	—
(Pennsylvania) Harrisburg City	1	1	0	0	1	0	0	1	2	1	0	1	50.00	2007	—
(New Jersey) Ocean City Barons	1	1	0	0	0	0	0	0	1	1	0	0	100.00	2009	—
(Washington (state)) Seattle Sounders FC	1	0	0	1	0	0	0	0	1	0	0	1	0.00	2009	—
(Utah) Real Salt Lake	2	2	0	0	0	0	0	0	2	2	0	0	100.00	2010	—
(Pennsylvania) Philadelphia Union	3	2	0	1	0	0	0	0	3	2	0	1	66.67	2011	—
Last updated March 6, 2015.

== Champions League ==
D.C. United first participated in the CONCACAF Champions League back when the tournament was called the CONCACAF Champions Cup. They debuted in the competition in 1997, subsequent to winning the 1996 MLS Cup. They have appeared in nine tournaments, more than any other American club, by winning four MLS Cup championships, four MLS Supporters' Shield league championships and one U.S. Open Cup championship.

The United are also one of only two American soccer clubs in history to win a continental title, the other being Los Angeles Galaxy. The United won the 1998 edition of the tournament. Since then, their best results have been semifinal runs in 2007 and 2008.

Club^{[J]}	P	W	D	L	P	W	D	L	P	W	D	L	Win %	First	Notes
Club^{[J]}	Home				Away				Total				Win %	First	Notes
(Trinidad and Tobago) United Petrotrin	1	1	0	0	0	0	0	0	1	1	0	0	100.00	1997	—
(United States) Los Angeles Galaxy	2	0	1	1	1	0	1	0	3	0	2	1	0.00	1997	—
(Mexico) Guadalajara	2	0	2	0	1	0	0	1	3	0	2	1	0.00	1997	—
(Trinidad and Tobago) Joe Public	1	1	0	0	0	0	0	0	1	1	0	0	100.00	1998	—
(Mexico) León	1	1	0	0	0	0	0	0	1	1	0	0	100.00	1998	—
(Mexico) Toluca	2	1	0	1	1	0	1	0	3	1	1	1	33.33	1998	—
(Honduras) Olimpia	2	2	0	0	1	1	0	0	3	3	0	0	100.00	1999	—
(Mexico) Necaxa	1	0	0	1	0	0	0	0	1	0	0	1	0.00	1999	—
(United States) Chicago Fire	0	0	0	0	1	0	1	0	1	0	1	0	0.00	1999	—
(Costa Rica) Alajuelense	2	2	0	0	1	0	0	1	3	2	0	1	66.67	2000	—
(Mexico) Pachuca	2	1	0	1	1	0	0	1	3	1	0	2	33.33	2000	—
(Jamaica) Arnett Gardens	1	1	0	0	1	1	0	0	2	2	0	0	100.00	2001	—
(Guatemala) Comunicaciones	2	2	0	0	1	0	0	1	3	2	0	1	66.67	2001	—
(Mexico) América	0	0	0	0	1	0	0	1	1	0	0	1	0.00	2001	—
(Jamaica) Harbour View	2	1	1	0	2	2	0	0	4	3	1	0	75.00	2005	—
(Mexico) UNAM	1	0	1	0	0	0	0	1	2	0	1	1	0.00	2005	—
(Costa Rica) Saprissa	1	0	0	1	1	0	1	0	2	0	1	1	0.00	2008	—
(Mexico) Cruz Azul	1	0	0	1	1	0	0	1	2	0	0	2	0.00	2008	—
(Honduras) Marathón	2	1	0	1	2	0	0	2	4	1	0	3	25.00	2008	—
(El Salvador) Firpo	1	0	1	0	1	0	1	0	2	0	2	0	0.00	2009	—
(Trinidad and Tobago) San Juan Jabloteh	1	1	0	0	1	1	0	0	2	2	0	0	100.00	2009	—
(Panama) Tauro	1	1	0	0	1	1	0	0	2	2	0	0	100.00	2015	—
(Jamaica) Waterhouse	1	1	0	0	1	1	0	0	2	2	0	0	100.00	2015	—
Last updated March 6, 2015.

== SuperLiga ==
D.C. United has participated in two North American SuperLiga's to-date. The SuperLiga, similar to UEFA's Europa League is the second-highest international soccer competition in North America.

Originally, the tournament was by invitation-only, in an effort to market to MLS markets with high Hispanic populations, as well to emphasize the arrival of David Beckham with the L.A. Galaxy. In 2008, the tournament was for the best four overall clubs in MLS, which is how D.C. United qualified, by being the Supporters' Shield winners, and having a 1st place overall record.

In 2009 the SuperLiga format changed to allow more clubs to have international play, and to decongest the schedules for Champions League clubs. It's now for the best MLS and Primera División de México clubs that do not qualify for the CONCACAF Champions League. Below are D.C. United's records vs. all opponents they have faced in the SuperLiga:

Club^{[J]}	P	W	D	L	P	W	D	L	P	W	D	L	Win %	First	Notes
Club^{[J]}	Home				Away				Total				Win %	First	Notes
(Mexico) Morelia	1	0	1	0	0	0	0	0	1	0	1	0	0.00	2007	—
(Mexico) América	1	1	0	0	0	0	0	0	1	1	0	0	100.00	2007	—
(United States) Houston	1	0	0	1	1	0	0	1	2	0	0	2	0.00	2007	—
(United States) L.A. Galaxy	0	0	0	0	1	0	0	1	1	0	0	1	0.00	2007	—
(Mexico) Guadalajara	1	0	0	1	0	0	0	0	1	0	0	1	0.00	2008	—
(Mexico) Atlante	1	0	0	1	0	0	0	0	1	0	0	1	0.00	2008	—
Last updated December 28, 2010.

=== Results ===
Club^{[A]}	P	W	D	L	Win %	First	Notes
Club^{[A]}	Total				Win %	First	Notes
D.C. United	—						
MLS Regular Season	543	240	113	190	44.20	1996	
MLS Cup Playoffs	36	19	9	8	52.78	1996	
Lamar Hunt U.S. Open Cup	48	35	2	11	72.92	1996	—
CONCACAF Champions League	51	24	11	16	47.06	1996	—
Copa Interamericana	2	1	0	1	50.00	1998	Defunct
CONCACAF Giants Cup	4	3	0	1	75.00	2001	Defunct
North American Superliga	7	1	1	5	14.29	2007	Defunct

== Footnotes ==
A : Includes matches played in the MLS Cup Playoffs and MLS Cup. All results are referenced to ESPN Soccernet, and RSSSF.
B : Chivas USA and Real Salt Lake are expansion teams that joined MLS in the 2005 season.
C : The Portland Timbers and the Vancouver Whitecaps joined MLS in the 2011 season.
D : The Seattle Sounders joined MLS in the 2009 season.
E : The Chicago Fire are an expansion team that joined MLS in the 1997 season.
F : The Houston Dynamo is an expansion team that joined MLS in the 2006 season.
G : The Philadelphia Union are an expansion team that joined MLS in the 2010 season.
H : Toronto FC is an expansion team that joined MLS in the 2007 season.
I : Includes qualification matches. All results are referenced to United States Soccer Federation, and RSSSF.
J : Includes preliminary round matches. All results are references to ESPN Soccernet, and RSSSF.
