= Kevin Payne (soccer) =

American soccer executive (1953–2022)

- Born: March 5, 1953
- Died: December 25, 2022 (aged 69); Charleston, South Carolina, United States
- Occupation: Soccer executive
- Years active: 1989–2021
- Children: 2
- Awards: Werner Fricker Builder Award (2011); D.C. United Hall of Tradition (2015); National Soccer Hall of Fame inductee (2021)

Kevin J. Payne (March 5, 1953 – December 25, 2022) was an American soccer executive. He was the president and chief executive officer of D.C. United from 1994 to 2012, and the president and general manager of Toronto FC. He was also chairman of the technical committee and board member for the U.S. Soccer Federation and vice chairman of the U.S. Soccer Foundation.

== Early career ==
Payne played soccer growing up, in college and at the amateur/semipro level. After careers as an award-winning radio journalist in New York City and as a senior resort marketing and special events executive in Vail, CO, Payne became the national administrator of the United States Soccer Federation in 1989. In the fall of 1990, he was named deputy executive director and director of marketing for the federation. In 1991, he moved to New York and became the executive vice president and, ultimately, the president of Soccer USA Partners, which owned all marketing, broadcast and event promotion rights to the United States men's national soccer team leading up to the 1994 FIFA World Cup.

Payne left the federation in 1991 to become executive vice president of sales and marketing of Soccer USA Partners (SUSAP/API Soccer), and was named its president in early 1994. This sports marketing agency staged more than 60 U.S. national team matches, including the 1992 and 1993 U.S. Cups, and developed more than $35 million in sponsorships for U.S. Soccer and U.S. Youth Soccer.

== Major League Soccer ==
In the fall of 1994, Payne, as president of SUSAP, began to work with Alan Rothenberg and a charter group of investors on the creation of Major League Soccer (MLS). Payne put together the original investment group for D.C. United, which included George Soros, Paul Tierney and The Sponsorship Group/API and served as the president and general manager of the team from its inception. Under his guidance, D.C. United has been the most successful team in MLS, winning 13 major championships.

In 2001, Payne joined Anschutz Entertainment Group (AEG) as senior vice president and managing director of AEG Soccer, which, during his tenure, oversaw six MLS teams, including the Los Angeles Galaxy, Colorado Rapids, Chicago Fire, D.C. United, MetroStars and San Jose Earthquakes. Payne also oversaw all other AEG soccer activities until his decision to return to D.C. United in 2004 as president and CEO.

Payne served as member of the board of governors of MLS and sat on the league marketing and competition committees

Payne left D.C. United for Toronto FC in November 2012. He served as club president and general manager until being fired in September 2013.

== Career history ==
- President/CEO, D.C. United, 1994–2001
- Senior vice president and managing director, AEG Soccer, 2001–2004
- President/CEO, D.C. United, 2004–2012
- President/general manager, Toronto FC, 2012–2013
- CEO/executive director, US Club Soccer, 2015–2021

== Personal life and death ==
Payne and his wife Pamela lived in Reston, Virginia, and had two daughters, Ashley and Rebecca. He died from idiopathic pulmonary fibrosis in Charleston, South Carolina, on December 25, 2022, at the age of 69.
