= Yuriy Smotrych =

Ukrainian footballer

Personal information
- Full name: Yuriy Ivanovych Smotrych
- Date of birth: 5 June 1962 (age 64)
- Place of birth: Odesa, Ukrainian SSR
- Height: 1.86 m (6 ft 1 in)
- Position: Defender

Senior career*
Years	Team	Apps	(Gls)
1981–1986	Chornomorets Odesa	51	(0)
1987–1988	SKA Karpaty Lviv	68	(5)
1989–1990	Chornomorets Odesa	19	(0)
1990–1993	Boby Brno	29	(1)
1993–1995	Chornomorets Odesa	24	(0)
1995	Mykolaiv	11	(0)
1995–1996	Prykarpattya Ivano-Frankivsk	7	(0)
1996–1997	Rochester Raging Rhinos	34	(0)
- * Club domestic league appearances and goals

Yuriy Ivanovych Smotrych (Ukrainian: Юрій Іванович Смотрич; born 5 June 1962) is a Ukrainian former professional footballer.

Smotrych played for Rochester Raging Rhinos in the 1996 U.S. Open Cup final.

== Honours ==
- USSR Federation Cup winner: 1990.
