= ATX Pro Challenge =

- Founded: 2014
- Teams: 4
- Current champions: D.C. United (1st title)
- Most championships: D.C. United (1 title)
- 2015 ATX Pro Challenge

The ATX Pro Challenge was a preseason soccer tournament hosted by the Austin Aztex and held in Austin, Texas. The only tournament was won by D.C. United.

== Trophy ==
The trophy received media attention for its unique character, being an armadillo donning a stetson hat, along with two pistol holsters.
