= 2015 ATX Pro Challenge =

Soccer tournament

Tournament details
- Host country: United States
- Dates: February 13 – 15
- Teams: 4
- Venue: 1 (in 1 host city)

Final positions
- Champions: D.C. United (1st title)
- Runners-up: FC Dallas

Tournament statistics
- Matches played: 4

The 2015 ATX Pro Challenge was the first edition of the preseason soccer tournament. The tournament was hosted by USL Pro side Austin Aztex with matches being played at Mike A. Myers Stadium on the campus of the University of Texas at Austin.

The first installation of the tournament was won by D.C. United, who beat FC Dallas 1–0 in the final.

== Participants ==
Team	League	Appearance
(Texas) Austin Aztex (hosts)	USL	1st
(Ohio) Columbus Crew	MLS	1st
(Washington, D.C.) D.C. United	MLS	1st
(Texas) FC Dallas	MLS	1st

== Bracket ==
Semi-finals
February 13 - Austin
Austin Aztex	0
D.C. United	2
February 13 - Austin
FC Dallas	3
Columbus Crew	1

Final
February 15 - Austin
D.C. United	1
FC Dallas	0
Third place
February 15 - Austin
Austin Aztex	0
Columbus Crew	1

== Matches ==
=== Semifinals ===
February 13	FC Dallas	3–1	Columbus Crew SC	Austin, Texas
17:45 CST	Pérez 29'; Hollingshead 38', 44'; Harris (yellow card) 43'; Toja (yellow card) 71'	Report	Kamara (yellow card) 28'; Parkhurst (yellow card) 45'; Tchani (yellow card) 60'; Steindórsson 65'	Stadium: Mike A. Myers Stadium; Referee: Ismail Elfath

February 13	Austin Aztex	0–2	D.C. United	Austin, Texas
20:00 CST			Opare (yellow card) 4'; Aguilar 9'; Doyle 16'; Arnaud (yellow card) 85'	Stadium: Myers Stadium

=== Consolation match ===
February 15	Austin Aztex	0–1	Columbus Crew	Austin, Texas
17:45 CST	Guaraci (yellow card) 32'; Mulamba (yellow card) 55'	Report	Trapp (yellow card) 38'; Barson 81'	Stadium: Myers Stadium; Referee: Hilario Grajeda

=== Final ===
February 15	FC Dallas	0–1	D.C. United	Austin, Texas
14:15 EDT			Arnaud (yellow card) 13'; Rolfe 54'; Trialist (yellow card) 90'	Stadium: Myers Stadium

== Scorers ==
2 goals

- (United States) Ryan Hollingshead — FC Dallas

1 goal

- (Mexico) Miguel Aguilar — D.C. United
- (United States) Chad Barson — Columbus Crew
- (Republic of Ireland) Conor Doyle — D.C. United
- (Panama) Blas Pérez — FC Dallas
- (United States) Chris Rolfe — D.C. United
- (Iceland) Kristinn Steindórsson — Columbus Crew

== See also ==
- ATX Pro Challenge
