= List of D.C. United head coaches =

D.C. United has had several head coaches since the inaugural 1996 Major League Soccer season. The club has had seven permanent head coaches. Bruce Arena was the club's inaugural coach in 1996, leaving his position coaching the men's soccer team at the University of Virginia. In 1998, after winning two MLS Cups and the 1996 U.S. Open Cup, Arena left to coach the United States men's national soccer team. Thomas Rongen then left his head coach position with the New England Revolution to come to D.C. Rongen led D.C. to another MLS cup in 1999 but was replaced by Ray Hudson in 2002, who was hired after the contraction of his Miami Fusion F.C. that year.

Hudson saw D.C. United fall to last in the table in 2002 and lose in the first round of the playoffs in 2003. Former Chicago Fire player Piotr (Peter) Nowak was then hired to replace Hudson, and led D.C. United to their fourth MLS Cup in 2004. Nowak left on December 21, 2006, for an assistant coaching position on the U.S. men's national team. Tom Soehn, another former Chicago Fire player, was hired next, and was the first American to coach the team since Bruce Arena. He left the team at the end of the 2009 season. On December 28, 2009, D.C. hired former Kansas City Wizards manager Curt Onalfo as their sixth head coach. On August 4, 2010, Onalfo was dismissed as head coach of D.C. United and former player Ben Olsen was named interim head coach. On November 29, 2010, Olsen was named head coach on a permanent basis. After a string of losses during the 2020 season, Ben Olsen was replaced by Chad Ashton on October 8, 2020. Aston's tenure as interim coach ended at the conclusion of the 2020 season, and D.C. appointed Hernán Losada as permanent head coach on January 18, 2021. On July 12, 2022, former Manchester United and DC United star Wayne Rooney came back to DC as their manager.

== List of head coaches ==
This list includes all those who have managed the club since 1996, when the club joined Major League Soccer for the first time, whether coaching on a full-time or caretaker basis. Games played include all League, Cup, Playoff, and Continental matches, and the win percentage is calculated from the total of games.

- Figures correct as of October 15, 2023. Includes all competitive matches

M = Matches played; W = Matches won; D = Matches drawn; L = Matches lost; F = Goals for; A = Goals against

Name	Nat	From	To	M	W	D	L	F	A	Win^{1}	Notes
Bruce Arena	(United States)	January 3, 1996	October 30, 1998	131	74	15^{3}	42	-	-	56.48%	
Thomas Rongen	(Netherlands)	December 2, 1998	August 4, 2001	97	45	8	44	-	-	46.39%	
Ray Hudson	(England)	January 8, 2002	December 15, 2003	110	44	20	46	-	-	40.00%	
Piotr Nowak	(Poland)	January 7, 2004	December 19, 2006	110^{3}	50	26	34	178	143	45.45%	
Tom Soehn	(United States)	December 21, 2006	November 3, 2009	110	48	25	37	171	152	43.64%	
Curt Onalfo	(United States)	January 5, 2010	August 4, 2010	22	7	3	12	22	34	31.82%	
Ben Olsen	(United States)	November 29, 2010	October 8, 2020	331	117	75^{2}	139	428	469	35.35%	Interim coach from August 5 – November 28, 2010
Chad Ashton	(United States)	October 8, 2020	November 8, 2020	5	3	1	1	8	6	60.00%	Interim coach from October 8 – November 8, 2020
Hernán Losada	(Argentina)	January 18, 2021	April 20, 2022	12	5	1	6	17	14	41.67%	
Chad Ashton	(United States)	April 20, 2022	July 12, 2022	12	3	2	7	16	32	25.00%	Interim coach from April 20 – July 23, 2022
Wayne Rooney	(England)	July 12, 2022	October 8, 2023	53	14	13	26	61	86	26.41%	
Frédéric Brillant	(France)	October 8, 2023	January 10, 2024	1	1	0	0	2	1	100.00%	Interim Coach
Troy Lesesne	(United States)	January 10, 2024	July 10, 2025	61	18	17	26	74	112	29.51%	
Kevin Flanagan	(United States)	July 10, 2025	August 16, 2025	5	0	0	5	5	12	0.00%	Interim Coach From July 10 - August 16
René Weiler	(Switzerland)	August 16, 2025	November 14, 2026	27	6	13	8	9	16	22.22%	
Óscar Pareja	(Colombia)	November 14, 2026	Present	0	0	0	0	0	0	0.00%	

- ^{1} Win% is rounded to a whole.
- ^{2} Three drawn cup games lost and one won after extra time or on penalties.
- ^{3} MLS matches that went into penalty kick shootouts are counted as a draw

== Coaches with Honors ==
Name	Nat	Tenure	Honors
Bruce Arena	(United States)	1996–1998	1996 U.S. Open Cup; 1996 MLS Cup; 1997 MLS Cup; 1997 MLS Supporters' Shield; 1998 CONCACAF Champions' Cup; 1998 Copa Interamericana
Thomas Rongen	(Netherlands)	1999–2001	1999 MLS Cup; 1999 MLS Supporters' Shield
Piotr Nowak	(Poland)	2004–2006	2004 MLS Cup; 2006 MLS Supporters' Shield
Tom Soehn	(United States)	2007–2009	2007 MLS Supporters' Shield; 2008 U.S. Open Cup
Ben Olsen	(United States)	2010–2020	2013 U.S. Open Cup
