= Eddie Pope =

American soccer player (born 1973)

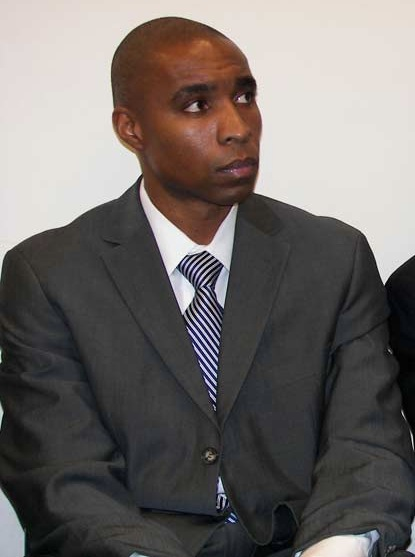
- Pope in 2008

Personal information
- Full name: George Edward Pope
- Date of birth: December 24, 1973 (age 52)
- Place of birth: High Point, North Carolina, U.S.
- Height: 6 ft 1 in (1.85 m)
- Position: Defender

College career
Years	Team	Apps	(Gls)
1992–1995	North Carolina Tar Heels		

Senior career*
Years	Team	Apps	(Gls)
1996–2002	D.C. United	143	(8)
2003–2004	MetroStars	42	(0)
2005–2007	Real Salt Lake	69	(2)
Total		254	(10)

International career^{‡}
1996–2006	United States	82	(8)
Medal record
Representing United States
Men's soccer
CONCACAF Gold Cup
Runner-up	1998 United States
Winner	2005 United States
- * Club domestic league appearances and goals as of October 19, 2007 ‡ National team caps and goals as of August 3, 2006

George Edward Pope (born December 24, 1973) is an American former soccer player who last played for Real Salt Lake of Major League Soccer and spent eleven years as a defender for the United States national team. He spent most of his career playing for D.C. United. Pope is a member of the National Soccer Hall of Fame.

== Youth ==
Born in High Point, North Carolina, Pope attended Southwest Guilford High School. Pope had a very successful career playing for the North Carolina Tar Heels where he also kicked for Mack Brown's football team. In 1994, he was a first-team All-American, and also earned All-ACC and All-South Region honors.

== Professional club career ==
In 1996, D.C. United selected Pope in the first round (second overall) in the MLS College Draft. His first season in Washington, D.C. was split between United and the men's Olympic team, which was preparing for the 1996 Summer Olympics in Atlanta. However, he still played 18 games for United and won a league title with the team, scoring a golden goal in the first-ever MLS Cup against the Los Angeles Galaxy. He also played his first game with the national team, helping the team beat Trinidad and Tobago 2–0 on November 10 that year.

In 1997, Pope made quite a splash on the MLS scene. He was named MLS Defender of the Year and earned a place in the MLS Best XI, as well as winning a second MLS title. In 1998, Pope helped United win both the CONCACAF Champions Cup and the InterAmerican Cup, the first continental honors earned by an MLS team. He scored goals in both of these two finals; including the winning goal in United's victory in the Interamerican Cup.

Pope's 1999 season was beset by injuries, and his playing time was limited, which continued to pester him into 2000, although he would play 19 and 21 games, respectively, in those seasons, and he earned his third and fourth consecutive trips to the MLS All-Star Game. Injuries continued to dog Pope in 2001, but he again played in the All-Star Game and also played an important role in the national team's World Cup qualification. His injuries continued into the 2002 MLS season, and he only appeared in seventeen matches.

On December 23, 2002, Pope was traded to the MetroStars, along with Jaime Moreno and Richie Williams, in return for Mike Petke, a first-round draft pick, and an allocation. Pope continued his quality play with the MetroStars, captaining the team to an excellent defensive record. He was named to the MLS Best XI for the third time for his efforts. In 2004, he had a down year with the Metros, but was still voted to the MLS Best XI for a second consecutive season. After the year, Pope was traded to expansion Salt Lake for an allocation. He played three seasons with Real Salt Lake, providing veteran leadership for the expansion franchise. In 2007, he retired from professional soccer. In ten years in MLS, he scored nine goals and ten assists, plus added that MLS Cup goal and an assist in the playoffs. In 2005, he was named to the MLS All-Time Best XI.

On June 14, 2007, Pope announced his plans to retire from all competitive soccer at the end of the 2007 season, saying: "It's just time...You get up in the morning and you're in pain. Before practice, you are in pain. And after practice you are still in pain."

On March 11, 2011, he was selected for induction into the National Soccer Hall of Fame.

== International career ==
Pope began his international career with the United States men's national soccer team on November 10, 1996, in a World Cup qualifier against Trinidad and Tobago. At the time, he was in his rookie season with D.C. United. He quickly became a fixture for the national team, which surprised the world when it defeated Brazil 1-0 and made its way to the finals of the CONCACAF Gold Cup. Pope also played in two games for the disappointing U.S. campaign at the 1998 FIFA World Cup. In 2002, he started all five U.S. matches in the World Cup, and played a big part in the surprising success of the United States in that tournament.

Pope started every game he played with the national team. On August 3, 2006, Pope announced his retirement from international soccer. His international career included 82 caps and 8 goals over an eleven-year period.

== Post-playing career ==
Pope served as the director of player relations for the MLS Players Union following his playing retirement. In 2015, Pope left the MLS Players Union to work at the Octagon sports agency.

In 2022, Pope was named as sporting director of the newly founded MLS Next Pro club Carolina Core FC, to begin play in 2024. The club is based in his hometown of High Point, North Carolina.

== Career statistics ==
=== Club ===
Club performance			League		Cup		League Cup		Continental		Total	
Season	Club	League	Apps	Goals	Apps	Goals	Apps	Goals	Apps	Goals	Apps	Goals
U.S.			League		Open Cup		League Cup		North America		Total	
1996	D.C. United	Major League Soccer	18	2	1	1	6	1	0	0	25	5
1997	D.C. United	Major League Soccer	29	3	0	0	5	0	0	0	34	3
1998	D.C. United	Major League Soccer	20	1	0	0	6	0	0	0	26	1
1999	D.C. United	Major League Soccer	19	1	0	0	6	0	0	0	25	1
2000	D.C. United	Major League Soccer	21	0	1	0	0	0	0	0	22	0
2001	D.C. United	Major League Soccer	19	0	3	1	0	0	0	0	22	1
2002	D.C. United	Major League Soccer	17	1	0	0	0	0	0	0	17	0
2003	MetroStars	Major League Soccer	20	0	4	2	2	0	0	0	26	2
2004	MetroStars	Major League Soccer	22	0	1	0	2	0	0	0	25	0
2005	Real Salt Lake	Major League Soccer	20	1	0	0	0	0	0	0	20	1
2006	Real Salt Lake	Major League Soccer	22	0	0	0	0	0	0	0	22	0
2007	Real Salt Lake	Major League Soccer	27	1	0	0	0	0	0	0	27	1
Total	U.S.		254	10	10	4	27	1	0	0	291	15
Career total			254	10	10	4	27	1	0	0	291	15

=== International goals ===
#	Date	Venue	Opponent	Score	Result	Competition
1	March 16, 1997	Palo Alto, California	Canada	2–0	3–0	1998 World Cup qualifying
2	April 20, 1997	Foxboro, Massachusetts	Mexico	1–1	2–2	1998 World Cup qualifying
3	February 7, 1998	Oakland, California	Costa Rica	1–0	2–1	1998 CONCACAF Gold Cup
4	August 16, 2000	Foxboro, Massachusetts	Barbados	1–0	7–0	2002 World Cup qualifying
5	April 17, 2002	Dublin, Ireland	Ireland	1–1	1–2	Friendly
6	April 29, 2004	Dallas, Texas	Mexico	1–0	1–0	Friendly
7	January 29, 2006	Carson, California	Norway	3–0	5–0	Friendly
8	February 10, 2006	San Francisco, California	Japan	1–0	3–2	Friendly

== Honors ==
DC United

- MLS Cup: 1996, 1997, 1999
- Supporters' Shield: 1997, 1999
- U.S. Open Cup: 1996
- CONCACAF Champions League: 1998
- Copa Interamericana: 1998

United States

- CONCACAF Gold Cup: 2005

Individual

- MLS All-Star: 1997, 1998, 1999, 2000
- MLS Best XI: 1997, 1998, 2003, 2004
- MLS Defender of the Year: 1997
- CONCACAF Gold Cup Best XI: 1998
- MLS Fair Play Award: 2004
- National Soccer Hall of Fame 2011 Inductee
- MLS 10th Anniversary Team
