= Jaime Moreno (footballer, born 1974) =

Bolivian footballer (born 1974)

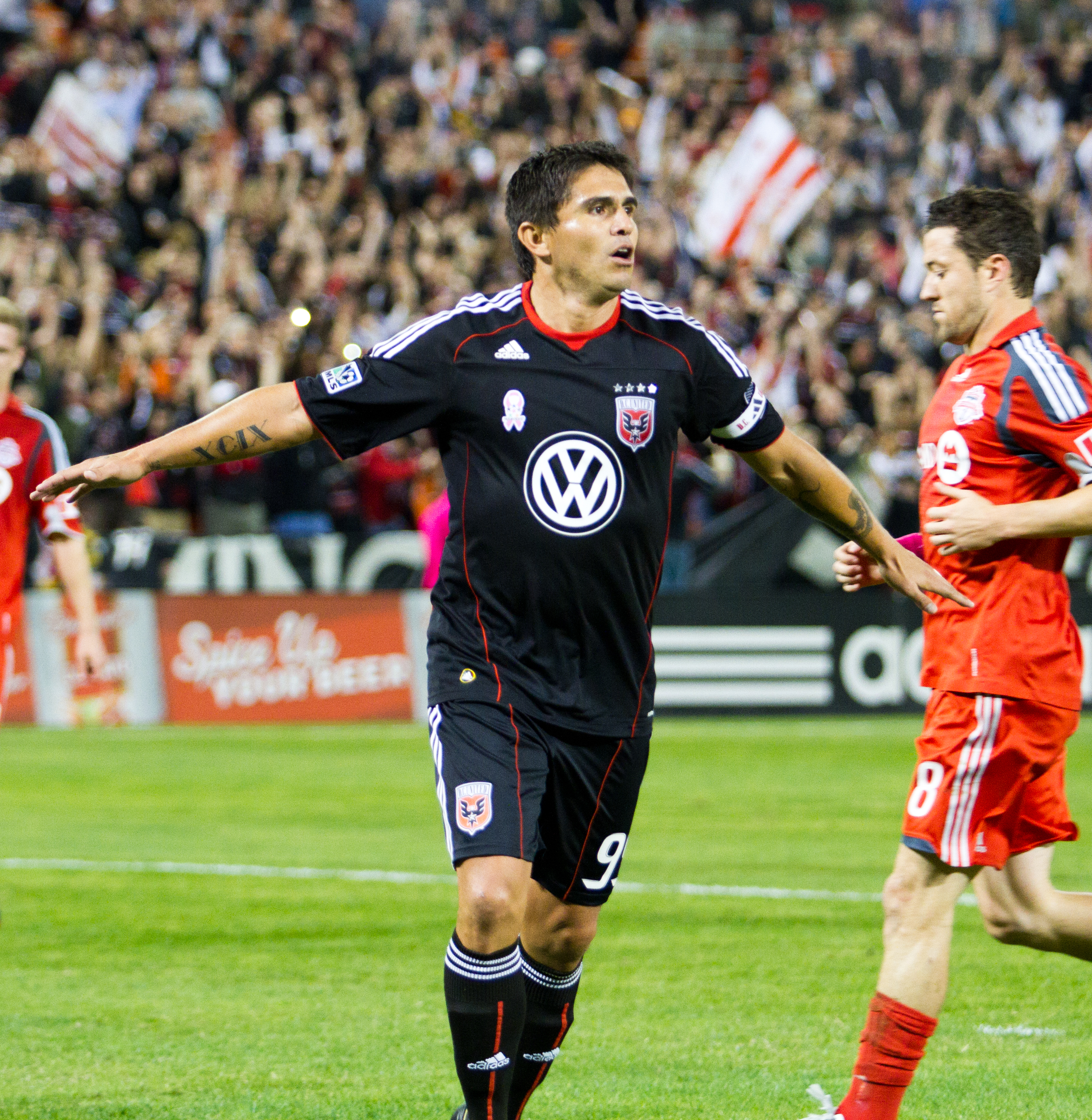
- Moreno with D.C. United in 2010, celebrating his final goal before retirement.

Personal information
- Full name: Jaime Moreno Morales
- Date of birth: 19 January 1974 (age 52)
- Place of birth: Santa Cruz de la Sierra, Bolivia
- Height: 5 ft 10 in (1.78 m)
- Position: Forward

Youth career
- Tahuichi Academy

Senior career*
Years	Team	Apps	(Gls)
1991–1994	Blooming	57	(14)
1994	Independiente Santa Fe	5	(0)
1994–1996	Middlesbrough	20	(1)
1996–2002	D.C. United	150	(69)
1997–1998	→ Middlesbrough (loan)	5	(1)
2003–2004	MetroStars	11	(2)
2004–2010	D.C. United	179	(62)
Total		427	(149)

International career
1991–2008	Bolivia	75	(9)

Managerial career
- 2011–2013: D.C. United U-23
- * Club domestic league appearances and goals

Jaime Moreno Morales (born 19 January 1974) is a Bolivian former professional footballer now serving as Youth Academy Technical Training Coach for D.C. United in Major League Soccer, and as the head coach of D.C. United's U-23 side.

Moreno began his career at Club Blooming and then played for Colombia's Independiente Santa Fe before spending two seasons at the English club Middlesbrough. The rest of his career was spent at D.C. United apart from one season at the New York MetroStars in 2003, and he was the all-time leading scorer in Major League Soccer at the time of his retirement in 2010. On 22 August 2007, in a match against the New York Red Bulls, he scored his 109th MLS goal, surpassing the previous league record set by former Dallas Burn and Real Salt Lake forward Jason Kreis. On 17 April 2009, Moreno became the first MLS player ever to reach the mark of 100 goals and 100 assists when he assisted on a Ben Olsen stoppage time goal.

From 1991 to 2008, Moreno played 75 matches for the Bolivia national team, scoring eight goals. He represented the nation in five Copa América tournaments and the 1994 FIFA World Cup.

== Club career ==
Moreno was born in Santa Cruz de la Sierra, Bolivia. He began his career attending the prestigious Tahuichi Academy and playing for Blooming from 1991 to 1994. He signed with the Colombian side Independiente Santa Fe in 1994, but made only five league appearances for the team.

In 1994 Moreno signed with Middlesbrough, and the following season he became the first Bolivian to play in the English Premiership. Moreno started in Middlesbrough's official opening of their new Riverside Stadium in a friendly against Italian side Sampdoria. He spent two years there, mostly coming off the bench. In total he made 20 league appearances for Boro, but only scored one league goal against Barnsley, also scoring another goal against A.C. Cesena in the Anglo-Italian Cup.

In 1996, in the middle of the Major League Soccer season, he was signed by the league and allocated to D.C. United, and helped lead them to the MLS Cup. He was one of the league's best players in 1997, when he led the league in goals (16), was named to the MLS Best XI and won another MLS Cup for his side (he would add a third Cup and another Best XI in 1999). After the 1997 season, he spent a few games on loan back to Middlesbrough, scoring once against Stoke City.

1998 was Moreno's best season, as he scored 16 goals and added 11 assists, only losing the MLS MVP Award to teammate and fellow Bolivian Marco Etcheverry. He continued to play well amid constant concerns about his weight, but injuries began to take toll in 2001. He missed a large chunk of the 2002 season, and a conflict with head coach Ray Hudson led to Moreno being traded to the MetroStars after that season.

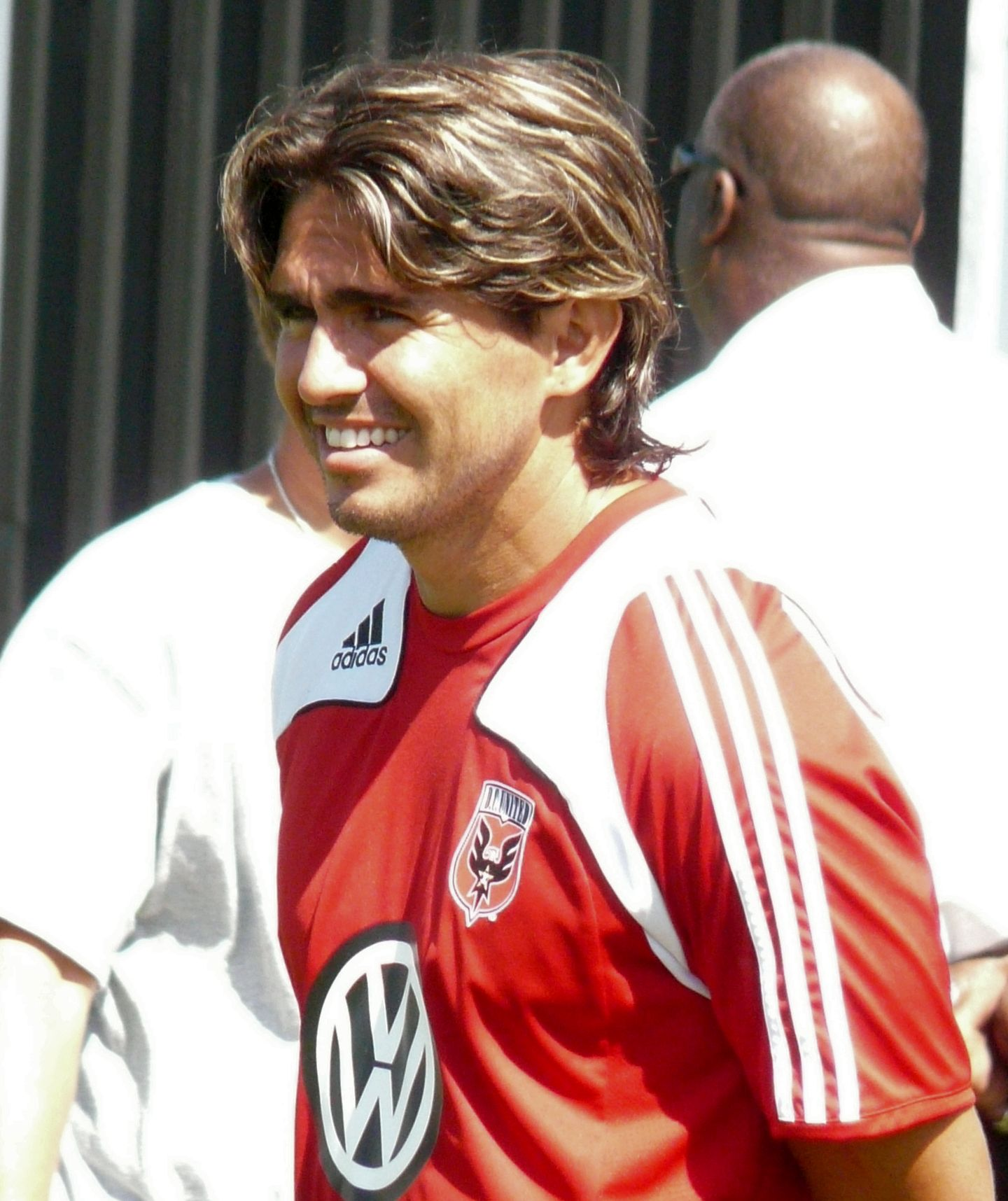
Moreno with D.C. United in 2008

Moreno missed most of his one season with the Metrostars, but did score two goals, one against United. He was shipped back to United before the 2004 season and, undertaking a strict training regimen to avoid injuries, regained much of his old form. He was a finalist for MLS MVP, was named to the league's Best XI for the second time, and led D.C. to their fourth MLS Cup. He was named to another Best XI in 2005. He was named to the MLS All-Time Best XI after the 2005 season.

In 2007, he scored his 108th goal on a penalty kick against Toronto FC on 19 May, tying him with Jason Kreis as the all-time leading scorer in MLS. Moreno and Steve Ralston are the only players to have played in each of the first 15 MLS seasons. On 12 August 2010, Jaime Moreno and D.C. United announced that the 2010 season would be his last year with the club. His last game was at home against Toronto FC on 23 October 2010, where he scored on a penalty kick.

After the 2010 MLS season D.C. United declined Moreno's contract option and he elected to participate in the 2010 MLS Re-Entry Draft. When he was not selected, Moreno retired as a player and was hired as Youth Academy Technical Training Coach for D.C. United on 4 March 2011.

== International career ==
Moreno was a regular on the Bolivia national team for most of the 1990s and played in the 1994 FIFA World Cup and the 1997 Copa América, but had been ignored for six years until recalled in 2007 for a friendly with Ireland. He played in the 2007 Copa América, where he scored his eighth international goal in the 39th minute of Bolivia's opening game against the host nation of Venezuela. He also scored in the 24th minute against Peru, though it was not enough for Bolivia to advance from the group stage.

Moreno announced his retirement from international football in October 2008, after 75 appearances and nine goals scored for his country. He played in 23 FIFA World Cup qualification matches and at the 1999 Confederations Cup.

== Managerial career ==
D.C. United announced on 1 March 2011 that Moreno had been named the club's Youth Academy Technical Training Coach.

On 5 May 2011; six months after his retirement, Moreno was hired by his former club, D.C. United, to coach their U-23 side. The team represents the highest tier in United's Academy, and will begin playing in the Premier Development League, the fourth division in American soccer in 2012.

== Post-playing career ==
On 14 September 2013, Moreno was inducted into the D.C. United Hall of Tradition at halftime of a match against the Los Angeles Galaxy at RFK Stadium.

On 2 October 2021, Moreno was inducted into the National Soccer Hall of Fame.

== Personal life ==
Moreno and his wife, Louise, reside in Loudoun County, Virginia, with their five children. Moreno's oldest son, James, 15, has been invited to train with Premier League club West Ham as of 20 October 2010.

== Career statistics ==
=== Club ===
Appearances and goals by club, season and competition
Club	Season	League			National cup (Note: Includes FA Cup, Open Cup)		League cup (Note: Includes League Cup)		Continental		Total	
Club	Season	Division	Apps	Goals	Apps	Goals	Apps	Goals	Apps	Goals	Apps	Goals
Middlesbrough	1994–95	First Division	14	1							14	1
Middlesbrough	1995–96	Premier League	7	0	0	0	0	0	–		7	0
Middlesbrough	Total		21	1							21	1
D.C. United	1996	Major League Soccer	9	3	0	0	4	1	0	0	13	4
D.C. United	1997	Major League Soccer	20	16			5	3			25	19
D.C. United	Total		29	19			9	4			38	23
Middlesbrough (loan)	1997–98	First Division	5	1	2	0	0	0	–		7	1
D.C. United	1998	Major League Soccer	31	16			6	1			37	17
D.C. United	1999	Major League Soccer	25	10			6	5			31	15
D.C. United	2000	Major League Soccer	25	12			0	0			25	12
D.C. United	2001	Major League Soccer	24	9			0	0	0	0	24	9
D.C. United	2002	Major League Soccer	16	3			0	0	0	0	16	3
D.C. United	Total		121	50			12	6			133	56
MetroStars	2003	Major League Soccer	11	2					0	0	11	2
D.C. United	2004	Major League Soccer	27	7			4	2	0	0	31	9
D.C. United	2005	Major League Soccer	29	16	1	0	2	0	4	1	36	17
D.C. United	2006	Major League Soccer	32	11	2	1	3	0	0	0	37	12
D.C. United	2007	Major League Soccer	21	7	0	0	2	0	4	1	27	8
D.C. United	2008	Major League Soccer	25	10	3	0	0	0	2	0	30	10
D.C. United	2009	Major League Soccer	24	9	3	1	0	0	5	2	32	12
D.C. United	2010	Major League Soccer	21	2	3	1	0	0	0	0	24	3
D.C. United	Total		179	62	12	3	11	2	15	4	217	71
Career total			365	135								

=== International ===
Scores and results list Bolivia's goal tally first, score column indicates score after each Moreno goal.

List of international goals scored by Jaime Moreno
No.	Date	Venue	Opponent	Score	Result	Competition
1	27 May 1993	Cochabamba, Bolivia	Paraguay		2–0	Copa Paz del Chaco
2	2 February 1994	Miami, United States	United States		1–1	Joe Robbie Cup
3	12 June 1996	Washington, D.C., United States	United States		2–0	U.S. Cup
4	10 November 1996	La Paz, Bolivia	Colombia		2–2	1998 FIFA World Cup qualification
5	12 January 1997	La Paz, Bolivia	Ecuador		2–0	1998 FIFA World Cup qualification
6	25 June 1997	La Paz, Bolivia	Mexico		3–1	1997 Copa América
7	28 June 2000	San Cristóbal, Venezuela	Venezuela		2–4	2002 World Cup Qualifying
8	26 June 2007	San Cristóbal, Venezuela	Venezuela		2–2	2007 Copa América
9	3 July 2007	Mérida, Venezuela	Peru		2–2	2007 Copa América

== Honours ==
D.C. United

- MLS Cup: 1996, 1997, 1999, 2004
- Supporters' Shield: 1997, 1999, 2006, 2007
- U.S. Open Cup: 1996, 2008
- CONCACAF Champions' Cup: 1998
- Copa Interamericana: 1998

Middlesbrough

- Football League First Division: 1994–95

Individual

- MLS All-Star: 1997, 1998, 1999, 2000
- MLS Best XI: 1997, 1999, 2004, 2005, 2006
- MLS Cup MVP: 1997
- D.C. United Hall of Tradition: 2013
- Washington DC Sports Hall of Fame: 2018
- National Soccer Hall of Fame: 2021
- MLS All-Time Best XI
- MLS 100 goals club
- MLS 50/50 club
