= 1996 U.S. Open Cup =

Tournament details
- Country: United States
- Teams: 17

Final positions
- Champions: D.C. United (1st title)
- Runners-up: Rochester Rhinos

Tournament statistics
- Matches played: 15
- Goals scored: 56 (3.73 per match)

The 1996 United States Open Cup was the 83rd edition of the tournament, and the first U.S. Open Cup to include Major League Soccer teams.

D.C. United defeated the Rochester Raging Rhinos 3–0 in the final at RFK Stadium, Washington, D.C.

Originally, four of the ten MLS teams entered the tournament. Five ended up participating, as D.C. United replaced the Los Angeles Galaxy (due to the Galaxy's congested schedule), and the Colorado Rapids replaced the Colorado Foxes (when the team could not reschedule its quarterfinal match against Kansas City). The A-League Rochester side beat two MLS teams en route to the final before falling to already-crowned MLS Cup champion D.C. United.

== Schedule ==
Schedule for 1996 U.S. Open Cup
Round	Match day	Entrants	Teams entered to date
First round	June 28 – July 4	5 USISL Select League teams 3 USASA teams	8 teams
Second round	July 30 – August 4	4 winners from first round 4 A-League teams	12 teams
Quarterfinals	September 4–16	3 winners from second round 5 Major League Soccer teams (Note: Second round winners Colorado Foxes were replaced by MLS team Colorado Rapids due to player availability.)	17 teams
Semifinals	October 12–27	4 winners from quarterfinals	17 teams
Final	October 30	2 winners from semifinals	17 teams

== Bracket ==
Second round
USASA	San Jose Oaks	0
A-L	Seattle Sounders	1
A-L	New York Fever	0
USISL	Carolina Dynamo	1
A-L	Rochester Rhinos	2
USISL	Fort Myers Manatees	0
A-L	Colorado Foxes	5
USISL	El Paso Patriots	1

Quarterfinals
MLS	Dallas Burn	3
A-L	Seattle Sounders	2
MLS	D.C. United	2
USISL	Carolina Dynamo	0
A-L	Rochester Rhinos (AET)	4
MLS	Tampa Bay Mutiny	3
MLS	Kansas City Wiz	2
MLS	Colorado Rapids	3

Semifinal
MLS	Dallas Burn	0
MLS	D.C. United	2
A-L	Rochester Rhinos	3
MLS	Colorado Rapids	0

Final
MLS	D.C. United	3
A-L	Rochester Rhinos	0

=== First Round ===
June 28, 1996	San Jose Oaks (USASA)	3–2	California Jaguars (USISL)

June 30, 1996	Fort Myers Manatees (USISL)	6–0	St. Petersburg Kickers (USISL)

July 3, 1996	Carolina Dynamo (USISL)	5–0	Mo's Sport Shop (USASA)
	Adair; Schweitzer; Gailey; Sloan; Beall	Report

July 4, 1996	El Paso Patriots (USISL)	3–0	RWB Adria (USASA)	El Paso, Texas
				Stadium: Dudley Field

=== Second Round ===
July 30, 1996	New York Fever (A-League)	0–1	Carolina Dynamo (USISL)	Valhalla, New York
		Report	Allnutt 11'

July 31, 1996	Rochester Raging Rhinos (A-League)	2–0	Fort Myers Manatees (USISL)	Rochester, New York
	Steenkamp 14'; Marinaro 56'	Report		Stadium: Frontier Field; Attendance: 6,149

August 4, 1996	San Jose Oaks (USASA)	0–1	Seattle Sounders (A-League)	San Jose, California
		Report	Thompson

August 4, 1996	Colorado Foxes (A-League)	5–1	El Paso Patriots (USISL)	Commerce City, Colorado
	McCreath 54'; Siersbaek 56'; Boyd 66', 86' (pen.); Epstein 82'	Report	Guardado 39', (red card) 86'	Stadium: Mile High Greyhound Park; Attendance: 1,623; Referee: Keith Hageman

=== Quarterfinals ===
September 4, 1996

D.C. United (MLS)	2–0	Carolina Dynamo (USISL)
Rammel 50', 83'	Report

Klöckner Stadium, Charlottesville, Virginia
Attendance: 1,829
Referee: Ruben Rodhas (USA)

September 7, 1996

Rochester Raging Rhinos (A-L)	4–3 (a.e.t.)	Tampa Bay Mutiny (MLS)
Gutierrez 34'; Miller 42', 82'; Kennell 113'	Report	Lassiter 80'; Valderrama 85' (pen.); Wise 86'

Frontier Field, Rochester, New York
Attendance: 12,428
Referee: Robert Sheker (USA)

September 15, 1996

Kansas City Wiz (MLS)	2–3	Colorado Rapids (MLS)
Bowers 36'; Takawira 62'	Report	Henderson 10', 85'; 45' (o.g.)

Arrowhead Stadium, Kansas City, Missouri
Attendance: 5,009
Referee: Ron Corey (USA)

Note: The Colorado Rapids replaced the Colorado Foxes when the team could not reschedule its Quarterfinal match after player availability conflicts due to CONCACAF World Cup Qualifying.

September 16, 1996

Dallas Burn (MLS)	3–2	Seattle Sounders (A-L)
Lozzano 58'; Elliott 70'; Eck 79'	Report	Leonetti 3'; Hoggan 90' (pen.)

Cotton Bowl, Dallas, Texas
Attendance: 1,305
Referee: Kevin Terry (USA)

=== Semifinals ===
October 12, 1996

Rochester Raging Rhinos (A-L)	3–0	Colorado Rapids (MLS)
Steenkamp 32'; Miller 56', 85'	Report

Frontier Field, Rochester, New York
Attendance: 12,179

October 27, 1996

Dallas Burn (MLS)	0–2	D.C. United (MLS)
	Report	Moreno 12', 82'

Cotton Bowl, Dallas, Texas
Attendance: 1,958
Referee: Kevin Terry (USA)

=== Final ===
October 30, 1996

D.C. United (MLS)	3–0	Rochester Raging Rhinos (A-League)
Díaz Arce 45'; Pope 63'; Moreno 89'	Report

RFK Stadium, Washington, D.C.
Attendance: 7,234
Referee: Esse Baharmast (USA)

D.C. United
Rochester Raging Rhinos

GK	2	(United States) Mark Simpson
DF	4	(United States) Clint Peay		(substituted off) 46'
DF	23	(United States) Eddie Pope	(yellow card) 72
DF	12	(United States) Jeff Agoos		(substituted off) 71'
DF	11	(Argentina) Mario Gori
MF	16	(United States) Richie Williams	(yellow card) 72
MF	19	(United States) John Maessner		(substituted off) 46'
MF	6	(United States) John Harkes		(substituted off) 66'
MF	10	(Bolivia) Marco Etcheverry
FW	21	(El Salvador) Raul Diaz Arce		(substituted off) 74'
FW	9	(Bolivia) Jaime Moreno
Substitution:
DF		(United States) David Vaudreuil		(substituted on) 46'
DF		(United States) Tony Sanneh		(substituted on) 46'
MF		(United States) Brian Kamler		(substituted on) 66'
MF		(United States) Erik Imler		(substituted on) 71'
FW		(United States) Steve Rammel		(substituted on) 74'
Head Coach:
(United States) Bruce Arena

GK	1	(United States) Bill Andracki
DF	17	(Ghana) Fuseini Dauda	(yellow card) 77
DF	5	(Ukraine) Yuriy Smotrych
DF	6	(Brazil) Rene Rivass
DF	14	(Argentina) Gustavo Villagra
MF	7	(United States) Henry Gutierrez
MF	8	(United States) Tommy Tanner
MF	10	(Scotland) Yogi McKay		(substituted off) 46'
MF	23	(South Africa) Lenin Steenkamp
FW	19	(United States) Doug Miller
FW	21	(Canada) Hector Marinaro		(substituted off) 46'
Substitutions:
MF	22	Darrell Stuart		(substituted on) 46'
		Chris Kennell		(substituted on) 46'
Head Coach:
(Canada) Pat Ercoli

== See also ==
1996 National Amateur Cup
