= Sons of Ben =

Sons of Ben may refer to:

- Sons of Ben (literary group), term applied to followers of Ben Jonson in English poetry and drama in the first half of the seventeenth century
- Sons of Ben (MLS supporters association), a supporters organization for the Philadelphia Union MLS soccer team which began play in 2010
