= Sons of Ben (MLS supporters association) =

Independent supporters' group for Philadelphia Union

- Abbreviation: SoB
- Founded: January 17, 2007; 19 years ago
- Type: Supporters' group
- Team: Philadelphia Union
- Motto: Ad Finem Fidelis (Latin: "Faithful to the end")
- Location: Philadelphia, Pennsylvania
- Stadium: Subaru Park
- Membership: 2,003 paid (as of July 2017)
- Website: www.sonsofben.com

The Sons of Ben (SoB) is an independent supporters group for Philadelphia Union of Major League Soccer. The group was created in January 2007 by soccer fans from Philadelphia and its metropolitan area, using such existing Major League Soccer fan clubs as the Screaming Eagles, La Barra Brava, and Section 8 Chicago as models. The name of the club alludes to Benjamin Franklin, who was one of the most well-known Founding Fathers of the United States and a particularly iconic figure of Philadelphia.

== History ==
Bryan James, Andrew Dillon, and David Flagler founded the Sons of Ben supporters club on January 17, 2007, the 301st anniversary of Benjamin Franklin's birthday. Philadelphia soccer fan Ethan Gomberg suggested the name. The Sons of Ben are the first Philadelphia Union supporters club, and use the Philadelphia civic colors of light blue and yellow as opposed to the darker shades officially used by the team. The Sons of Ben began during a flurry of rumors regarding Major League Soccer's negotiations with investors regarding a potential team in the Philadelphia region. As of 2009, the group has more than 4,500 members and ran a season ticket drive in 2007, attracting 2,800 requests. On February 28, 2008, Philadelphia was confirmed to be the league's 16th team, meaning that their initial goal has been accomplished. The Sons of Ben refocused their efforts on the most important mission of any supporters club: supporting the local team. Union began play in 2010.

At the "Meet the Owners" event held two days before the official expansion press conference in Chester, the Sons of Ben wore nametags with handwritten numbers intended to read "2010." The number was mistakenly interpreted as "ZOLO" by team ownership group member, Nick Sakiewicz. This led to the Sons of Ben being referred to as the "Zolos" in a series of inside jokes by the group. The story of the group is told in the documentary film "Sons of Ben".

== Logo ==
The Sons of Ben logo, designed by co-founder Andrew Dillon, incorporates various components alluding to Philadelphia's history and the achievements of Benjamin Franklin. The oar and the scythe represent the city's nautical and agricultural roots. Franklin invented bifocals, while the key, lightning bolts, and lozenge-shaped kite symbolize his exploration into the nature of electricity. The crack in Franklin's skull resembles that of the historic Liberty Bell.

== Associated supporters groups ==
The Sons of Ben organization was created to help bring a Major League Soccer team to Philadelphia. Some of the founding members were originally supporters of D.C. United. Bryan James in particular was very active in the D.C. supporters culture.

== Philanthropy ==
December 2007 marked the Sons of Ben's first philanthropic effort, Help Kick Hunger. Help Kick Hunger is a canned food and donation drive aimed to benefit the Bernardine Center in Chester, which opened as an Emergency Food Cupboard. The Center designed the model Super Cupboard program in 1987. This program seeks to break the cycle of poverty and dependence for low-income mothers by providing weekly sessions that include nutrition education and life skills workshops. The Super Cupboard model has been copied extensively throughout Pennsylvania. Other philanthropic efforts include the 2007 4th quarter drive that raised $1,500 and 561 pounds (254 kg) of food for the Bernardine Center, the 1Q08 campaign that raised $1,500 worth of Easter hams and an additional $1,000, and the 2008 4th quarter Help Kick Hunger drive that raised $2,501 and 603 pounds (274 kg) of food. Most recently, the Sons of Ben were able to raise $10,000 through their Help Kick Hunger campaign, which was donated to the Bernardine Center at the end of 2010, more than their previous three efforts combined. The group has grown its philanthropic efforts since the founding season to include the Unified Soccer program of Special Olympics PA - Philadelphia, Delaware County SPCA, Philly ACCT, St. Baldrick's, Coats for Chester, Chester-Upland School District (school supply drives), Philadelphia Union Foundation, Keystone Wounded Warrior Project of PA, William Trippley Youth Development Foundation, and several others.
