= List of Philadelphia Union seasons =

Since its foundation in 2008, the American soccer club Philadelphia Union has played in Major League Soccer. The team has finished as runner-ups thrice in the U.S. Open Cup and once in the MLS Cup. The following is a list of seasons completed by the club, inclusive of all competitive competitions.

== Key ==
Key to competitions

- Major League Soccer (MLS) – The top-flight of soccer in the United States, established in 1996.
- U.S. Open Cup (USOC) – The premier knockout cup competition in U.S. soccer, first contested in 1914.
- CONCACAF Champions Cup (CCC) – The premier competition in North American soccer since 1962. It went by the name of Champions' Cup until 2008. It went by the name of CONCACAF Champions League (CCL) from 2008 until 2023.

Key to colors and symbols

1st or W	Winners
2nd or RU	Runners-up
3rd	Third place
Last	Wooden Spoon
♦	MLS Golden Boot
	Highest average attendance
Italics	Ongoing competition

Key to cup record

- DNE = Did not enter
- DNQ = Did not qualify
- NH = Competition not held or canceled
- QR = Qualifying round
- PR = Preliminary round
- GS = Group stage
- R1 = First round
- R2 = Second round
- R3 = Third round
- R4 = Fourth round
- R5 = Fifth round
- Ro16 = Round of 16
- QF = Quarterfinals
- SF = Semifinals
- F = Final
- RU = Runners-up
- W = Winners

== Seasons ==
Results of Philadelphia Union league and cup competitions by season
Season	League										Position		Playoffs	USOC	CCC	Other		Average attendance (Note: Average attendance only includes statistics from regular season matches.)	Top goalscorer(s) (Note: Top goalscorer(s) includes all goals scored in the regular season, MLS Cup Playoffs, U.S. Open Cup, MLS is Back Tournament, CONCACAF Champions League, FIFA Club World Cup, and other competitive continental matches.)	
Season	League	Pld	W	L	D	GF	GA	GD	Pts	PPG	Conf.	Overall	Playoffs	USOC	CCC	Competition	Result	Average attendance	Name(s)	Goals
2010	MLS	30	8	15	7	35	49	–14	31	1.03	7th	14th	DNQ	QR1	DNE	—	—	19,254	(France) Sébastien Le Toux	14
2011	MLS	34	11	8	15	44	36	+8	48	1.41	3rd	8th	QF	QR1	DNQ	—	—	18,259	(France) Sébastien Le Toux	11
2012	MLS	34	10	18	6	37	45	–8	36	1.06	8th	15th	DNQ	SF	DNQ	—	—	18,053	(United States) Jack McInerney	8
2013	MLS	34	12	12	10	42	44	–2	46	1.35	7th	14th	DNQ	Ro16	DNQ	—	—	17,867	(United States) Jack McInerney	12
2014	MLS	34	10	12	12	51	51	+0	42	1.24	6th	12th	DNQ	RU	DNQ	—	—	17,631	(France) Sébastien Le Toux	12
2015	MLS	34	10	17	7	42	55	–13	37	1.09	9th	18th	DNQ	RU	DNQ	—	—	17,451	(United States) C.J. Sapong	9
2016	MLS	34	11	14	9	52	55	–3	42	1.24	6th	13th	R1	QF	DNQ	—	—	17,519	(United States) Chris Pontius	12
2017	MLS	34	11	14	9	50	47	+3	42	1.24	8th	16th	DNQ	Ro16	DNQ	—	—	16,812	(United States) C.J. Sapong	16
2018	MLS	34	15	14	5	49	50	–1	50	1.47	6th	11th	R1	RU	DNQ	—	—	16,518	(Jamaica) Cory Burke (United States) Fafà Picault	10
2019	MLS	34	16	11	7	58	50	+8	55	1.62	3rd	5th	QF	R4	DNQ	—	—	17,111	(Poland) Kacper Przybyłko	15
2020 (Note: The 2020 season does not include match data from one-off, in-season MLS is Back Tournament. The Union finished as semi-finalists in that tournament.)	MLS	23	14	4	5	44	20	+24	47	2.04	1st	1st	R1	NH	DNQ	MLS is Back; Tournament	SF	2,775	(Brazil) Sérgio Santos	11
2021	MLS	34	14	12	8	48	35	+13	54	1.59	2nd	6th	SF	NH	SF	—	—	12,653	(Poland) Kacper Przybyłko	17
2022	MLS	34	19	5	10	74	26	+46	67	1.97	1st	2nd	RU	R32	DNQ	—	—	18,126	(Hungary) Dániel Gazdag	24
2023	MLS	34	15	9	10	57	41	+16	55	1.62	4th	5th	QF	R32	SF	Leagues Cup	3rd	18,907	(Hungary) Dániel Gazdag	22
2024	MLS	34	9	15	10	62	55	+7	37	1.08	12th	22nd	DNQ	DNE	Ro16	Leagues Cup	4th	18,845	(Hungary) Dániel Gazdag	19
2025	MLS	34	20	8	6	57	35	+22	66		1st	1st	QF	SF	DNQ	—	—		(Israel) Tai Baribo	18
Total		529	205	184	140	800	694	+106	755	1.39	W (3)	W (2)	RU (1)	RU (3)	SF (2)	—	—	—	(Hungary) Dániel Gazdag	69
