= Philadelphia Union =

American professional soccer club based in Philadelphia metropolitan area

- Full name: Philadelphia Union
- Nicknames: The Union; The U; Zolos; The Snakes
- Founded: February 28, 2008; 18 years ago
- Stadium: Subaru Park; Chester, Pennsylvania
- Capacity: 18,500
- Owner: Jay Sugarman
- Sporting director: Jon Scheer
- Head coach: Ryan Richter (interim)
- League: Major League Soccer
- 2026: Eastern Conference: 6th Overall: 11th Playoffs: TBD
- Website: www.philadelphiaunion.com
| Home colors | Away colors | Third colors |

The Philadelphia Union are an American professional soccer club based in the Philadelphia metropolitan area. The club competes in Major League Soccer (MLS) as a member of the Eastern Conference. Founded on February 28, 2008, the Union began playing in 2010 as an expansion team. The club's home stadium is Subaru Park, a soccer-specific stadium located in Chester, Pennsylvania, on the banks of the Delaware River.

The Union are currently owned by Keystone Sports & Entertainment, with Jay Sugarman serving as majority owner and chairman of the club. Professional basketball player Kevin Durant serves as a minority owner. The Union finished as runners-up in the 2014, 2015 and 2018 U.S. Open Cup tournaments and the 2022 MLS Cup final. In 2025, Philadelphia secured the Supporters' Shield with their regular season performance, the second in the club's history.

== History ==
=== Drive for expansion ===
Despite being one of the ten largest metropolitan areas in the country and a top-five media market, the Philadelphia area was not represented when Major League Soccer kicked off in 1996. Philadelphia was previously represented by the Philadelphia Atoms (1973–76) and Philadelphia Fury (1978–80) in the FIFA-backed, major professional North American Soccer League (NASL). The Atoms won the Soccer Bowl in their inaugural 1973 season. Philadelphia goalkeeper and Ridley Park, Pennsylvania, native Bob Rigby became the first soccer player to be featured on the cover of Sports Illustrated following the club's championship. The Atoms folded after the 1976 season, having been bought by Mexican owners whose plans to move the team to San Antonio were not approved by the league. The Atoms and the Fury both played at Veterans Stadium, though the Atoms played their final season in Philadelphia at Franklin Field. The NASL folded in 1984, leaving the United States without a top-level soccer league until Major League Soccer (MLS) began play in 1996.

The first effort to bring professional soccer back to the Delaware Valley commenced in 2001, when a group of investors attempted to bring an MLS franchise to Trenton, New Jersey. The centerpiece of their efforts was a $31 million soccer-specific stadium to be built across the street from the CURE Insurance Arena and with access to the under-construction NJ Transit River Line. "Union FC" was the intended name for the Trenton MLS team if it came to fruition. However, the MetroStars (now the New York Red Bulls) held the right to block a franchise in Trenton, as it would infringe on their 75-mile competition-free zone.

Five years later, plans were in place to construct a 20,000-capacity stadium on the campus of Rowan University in Glassboro, New Jersey. The stadium would serve as the home field for both an MLS expansion club and Rowan's football team. Ultimately, $100 million in state bonds to fund the stadium and various other improvements on the Rowan campus were dropped by New Jersey Governor Jon Corzine. Shortly after the Rowan proposal fell through, Keystone Sports & Entertainment (the group that would eventually own the Union) looked at a site underneath the Commodore Barry Bridge in Chester to develop a soccer-specific stadium.

In 2007, the Sons of Ben supporter group formed to raise interest toward a Major League Soccer team in Philadelphia. They are credited with demonstrating to MLS an established fan base in the market.

Major League Soccer added Philadelphia as its sixteenth team on February 28, 2008. The finalization of the club was the result of a $47 million package approved by Delaware County politicians and Pennsylvania governor Ed Rendell that included the cost of Subaru Park and a major urban renewal project.

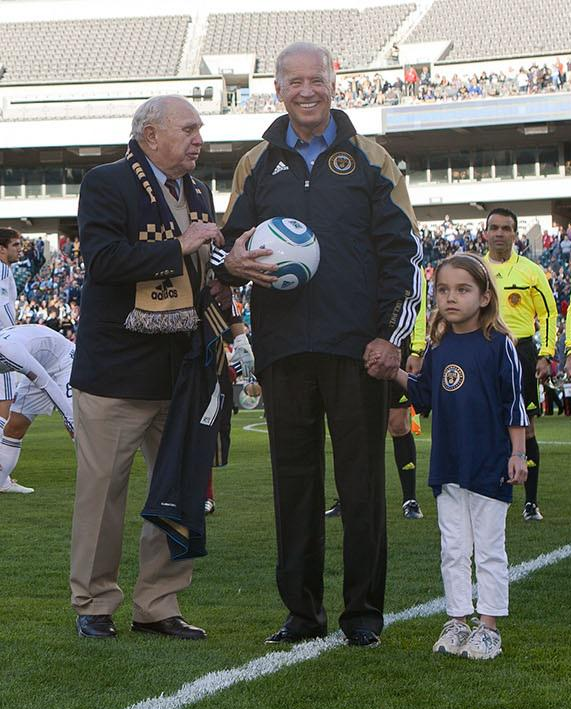
National Soccer Hall of Famer Walter Bahr, with then-Vice President Joe Biden, at a Philadelphia Union match, 2010

In December 2009, the Union added the Reading Rage youth soccer organization as their official minor league affiliate in the USL Premier Development League. As a result, the Rage were rebranded as "Reading United AC" with a new logo and colors for the 2010 PDL season. In the 2010 MLS SuperDraft, the Union selected forward Danny Mwanga from Oregon State University as the number one pick, as well as sixth and seventh picks Amobi Okugo from UCLA and Jack McInerney from the U.S. U-17 National Team in the first round. In March 2010, the Union signed an affiliation agreement with the Harrisburg City Islanders of the United Soccer League. And in January 2012, the Union formed their first international partnership with Deportivo Saprissa of the Costa Rican Primera División.

=== Inaugural season ===
The Union played their inaugural game on March 25, 2010, in which they lost 2–0 to Seattle Sounders FC at Qwest Field. Sébastien Le Toux became the first player to score a goal for Philadelphia in their home opener on April 10, 2010, a 3–2 win over D.C. United at Lincoln Financial Field. The team again played Seattle Sounders FC for the first match at Subaru Park on June 27, 2010. Le Toux scored the Union's initial goal at the venue from a penalty kick, which was instrumental to their 3–1 victory. All 12,000 season ticket packages for 2010 were sold prior to this opener. At the end of the inaugural season the Union finished 7th in the Eastern Conference and 14th overall in the league with a record of 8–15–7 (W-L-T).

=== The Piotr Nowak era (2010–2012) ===
The Union picked up three players in the 2011 MLS SuperDraft, most notably Zac MacMath, who was the fifth overall draft pick. On January 11, 2011, the Union acquired shirt sponsor Bimbo Bakeries USA. On January 20, Philadelphia introduced two new players: Colombians Faryd Mondragón (GK) and Carlos Valdés (D). Mondragón had recently come from playing with 1. FC Köln in the German Bundesliga, and has at least 50 caps with the Colombia national team. Valdés came from Independiente Santa Fe in the Colombian First Division, where he served as captain before coming to Philadelphia. The Union also signed during the summer transfer window US International Freddy Adu.

The team made a complete turnaround in the 2011 season, finishing 3rd in the Eastern Conference and 8th overall in the league with a record of 11–8–15 (W-L-T) scoring 44 goals and allowing 36. This marked the first time the Philadelphia Union qualified for the MLS Cup Playoffs. The Union had a stellar start of the season that saw them win 4 and only lost 1 of their first six league games. In the 2011 MLS Cup Playoffs the Union lost the first leg of the MLS Eastern Conference semi-finals 2–1 at home on October 30, 2011, with the 1st playoff Union goal coming from Sebastien Le Toux. The Union then lost the 2nd leg 1–0 on November 3, 2011, against the future MLS Cup finalist Houston Dynamo.

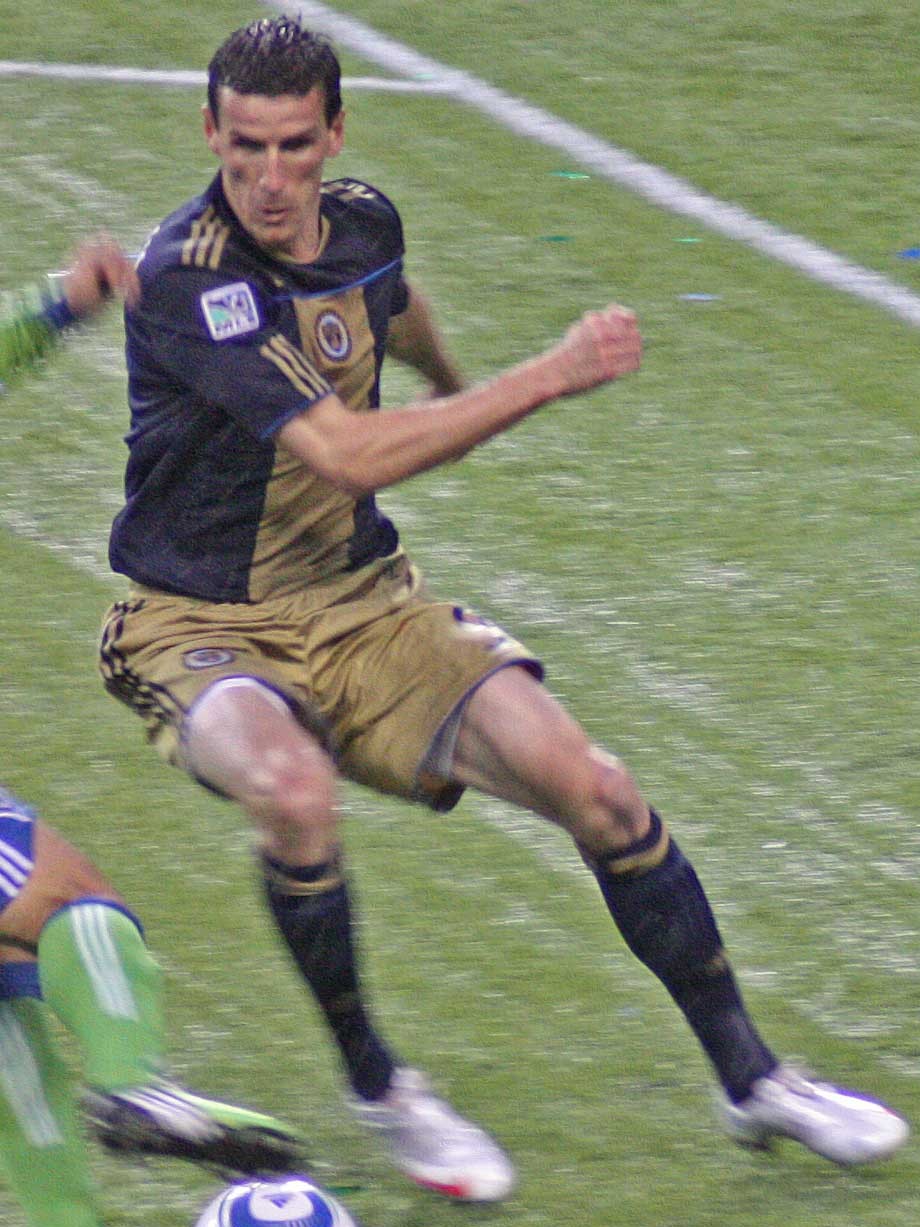
Sébastien Le Toux was the Union's first goal scorer.

=== Nowak to Hackworth (2012–2014) ===
John Hackworth became the Union's interim coach on June 13, 2012, receiving the role permanently on August 30, 2012. The Union finished their third season in eighth place in the Eastern Conference and fifteenth in MLS overall, with a record of 10–18–6 (W-L-T), scoring 37 goals and allowing 45. Antoine Hoppenot, who was selected in the third round of the 2012 Supplemental Draft, netted four goals within 817 minutes of play. Subaru Park, then known as PPL Park, was the site of the 2012 MLS All-Star Game in which the MLS All-Stars defeated Chelsea F.C., 3–2. The Union also made it to the semifinals of the 2012 U.S. Open Cup after defeating the Rochester Rhinos 3–0 in the third round and winning against D.C. United on the road 2–1, after extra time, in the fourth round. They subsequently defeated the Harrisburg City Islanders, their main affiliate at the time, 5–2 in the quarterfinals.

The Union traded allocation money in order to take the first overall pick, which was used on goalkeeper and Jamaican international Andre Blake. They then traded down multiple times in order to select Coastal Carolina University midfielder Pedro Ribeiro. Other new, preseason acquisitions included Maurice Edu, French midfielder Vincent Nogueira, Argentinian midfielder Cristian Maidana, and former MLS Rookie of the Year defender Austin Berry. Despite these additions, the Union still languished in mediocrity, winning just two of their first 14 games, posting a record of 2–7–5 (W-L-T). On April 20, 2014, the Union traded forward Jack McInerney to the Montreal Impact for winger Andrew Wenger, a Lancaster, Pennsylvania native. Hackworth's coaching career with the Union ended on June 10, 2014.

=== Jim Curtin takes charge (2014–2024) ===
Although failing to make the playoffs, the Union reached the 2014 Lamar Hunt U.S. Open Cup finals for the first time in the club's history. During the offseason, the club traded for forward C. J. Sapong from Sporting Kansas City. They also traded long time defensive midfielder Amobi Okugo to Orlando City SC. Other new preseason acquisitions included FC Nantes loanee Fernando Aristeguieta, S.L. Benfica loanee Steven Vitória, and free agent Cameroonian 18-year-old midfielder Eric Ayuk. During the 2015 MLS SuperDraft the Union drafted forward Dzenan Catic from Bosnia-Herzegovina, midfielder Eric Bird, and defender Raymond Lee. During the expansion draft, Orlando City SC drafted Philadelphia midfielder Pedro Ribeiro. Despite all the offseason transactions, the Union only registered one win in their first ten league games with a record of 1–6–3 (W-L-T).

During the 2015 summer transfer window, the Union traded longtime defender Sheanon Williams to the Houston Dynamo for allocation money, which they used to sign Swiss midfielder Tranquillo Barnetta on July 29, 2015. The club achieved a successful run in the 2015 Lamar Hunt U.S. Open Cup, earning a second consecutive appearance in the Open Cup final. This match took place against Sporting Kansas City, at Subaru Park on September 30, 2015.

In 2016, the Union would acquire Chris Pontius from D.C. United, Surinames midfielder Roland Alberg, and Brazilian right midfielder Ilsinho. They would also acquire U.S. international Alejandro Bedoya in the summer transfer window. The Union would also add key players from the 2016 MLS SuperDraft including Josh Yaro, Keegan Rosenberry, and Fabian Herbers. The 2016 season saw success from Goalkeeper Andre Blake who later would win the 2016 MLS Goalkeeper of the Year Award. The Union were in constant playoff contention, however went 0–5–2(W-L-T) in the final 7 matches of the regular season. The Union would still reach the playoffs for only the 2nd time in team history, beating out New England Revolution on goal differential. The Union were beaten 3–1 in the Knockout round of the 2016 MLS Cup Playoffs by Toronto FC.

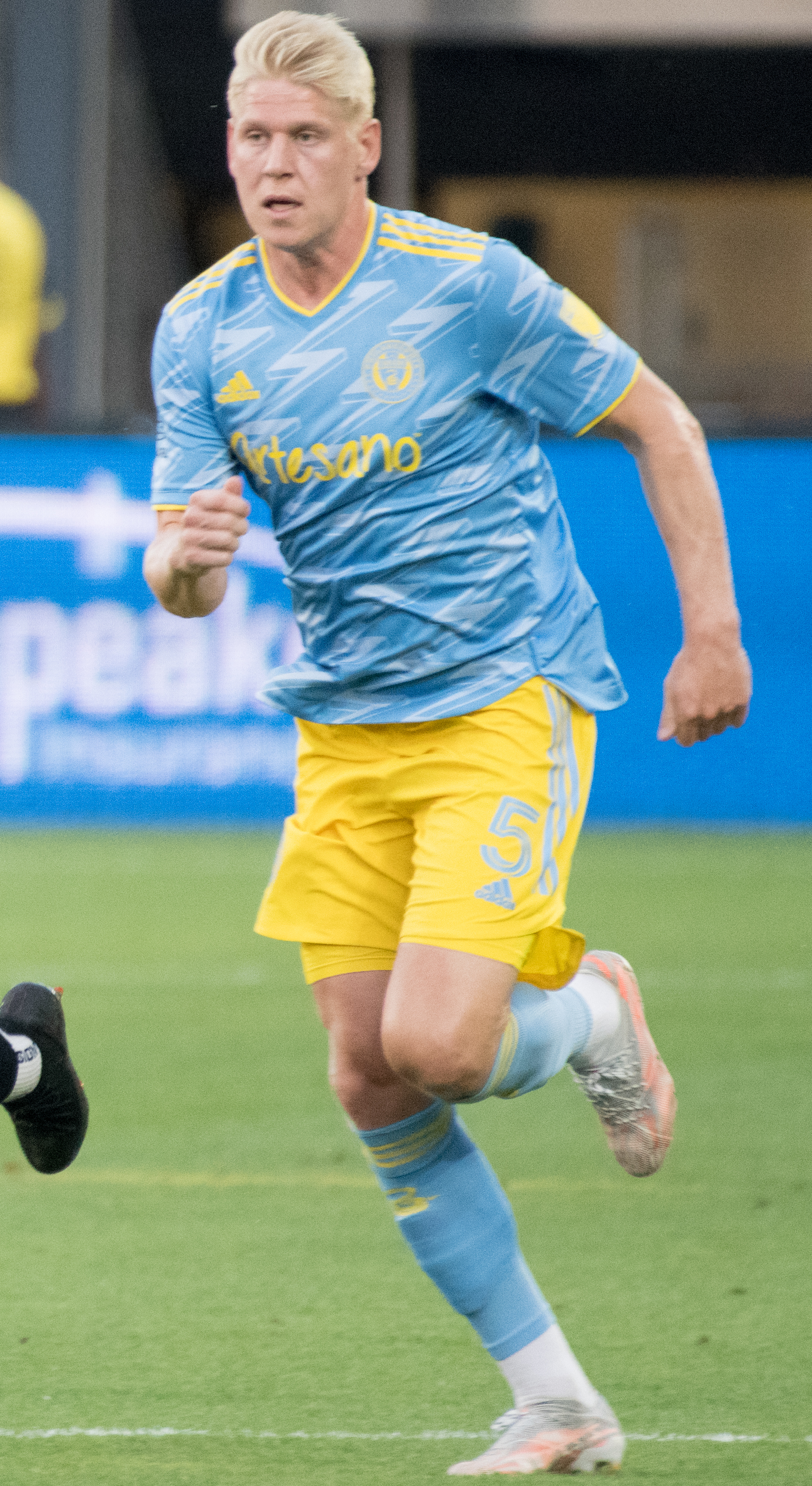
Jakob Glesnes during a May 2021 match is shown wearing the club's light blue away kit

A snake mascot, Phang, was introduced on September 10, 2018. Ahead of the 2019 season, Union Sporting Director, Ernst Tanner, announced that Curtin would be retained for the upcoming season on a one-year extension. By July of that season, the Union reach first place in the Eastern Conference and hitting the club's best start to a season. This success lead to the club announcing Curtin signed a two-year contract extension, to remain head coach through the 2021 season.

==== First trophy and success ====
The 2020 season was the most successful to date for the Union. Despite disruptions from the COVID-19 pandemic, the Union reached the semi-final of the MLS is Back Tournament and went on to win their first trophy finishing top of the league standings and earning the 2020 Supporters' Shield. The team's performance over the season earned Curtin his first Sigi Schmid Coach of the Year Award. Winning the Supporter's Shield earned the Union their debut in the CONCACAF Champions League, where the Union earned their first international win against Deportivo Saprissa; a victory that marked Curtin's 100th win as head coach of the club.

Within two days prior to the Union's first ever conference final match in team history, it was reported that 11 players, including six starters had to undergo the league's COVID-19 protocol. Philadelphia lost to eventual champions New York City FC 2–1. It was later stated that it would've been impossible to delay the game, as the players would not have been available for the MLS Cup Final.

On July 8, 2022, the Philadelphia Union defeated D.C. United 7–0, setting a club record and tying the MLS record for biggest goal differential win. The overall season proved to be special, as Philadelphia topped the Eastern table with 67 points—equal with Supporters' Shield winners Los Angeles FC (and with better goal differential but lost out due to MLS' tiebreaker of total wins). Philadelphia beat FC Cincinnati in the conference semifinals, 1–0, on a Leon Flach goal, and then defeated defending champions New York City FC 3–1 in the conference finals to advance to their first-ever MLS Cup final.

In MLS Cup, the Union erased 1−0 and 2−1 deficits and center back Jack Elliott scored twice in the match, including late in extra time. Ultimately LAFC came back to force penalties and won the Cup in a penalty shoot-out.

After a poor performance in the 2024 season, in which the Philadelphia Union failed to qualify for the playoffs, Jim Curtin was sacked on November 7, 2024.

=== Bradley Carnell era (2025–2026) ===
On January 2, 2025, Bradley Carnell was announced as the new head coach for the Philadelphia Union. Having recently managed St. Louis City SC, the club would acquire Indiana Vassilev from his former club, along with Jovan Lukić, Bruno Damiani, and mid-season signing Milan Iloski. Carnell would win his first match with Philadelphia, winning 4−2 at Orlando City. On April 11, 2025, the club's all-time top-scorer Dániel Gazdag transferred to Columbus Crew. Despite his departure, Philadelphia would go on to have a successful season. With a 1−0 win over New York City FC at Subaru Park, the Philadelphia Union clinched the Supporters' Shield for the second time in club history. The Union would win their best-of-three series with the Chicago Fire, but lost in the semifinals as the top seed in MLS to New York City FC for the second time in postseason history.

However, Carnell's time was short lived. The Union fired Carnell in May 2026, less than halfway through the 2026 season, after the Union started the season with a league-worst 1-10-4 record. Developmental team coach Ryan Richter was named the Union's interim manager.

== Colors and badge ==
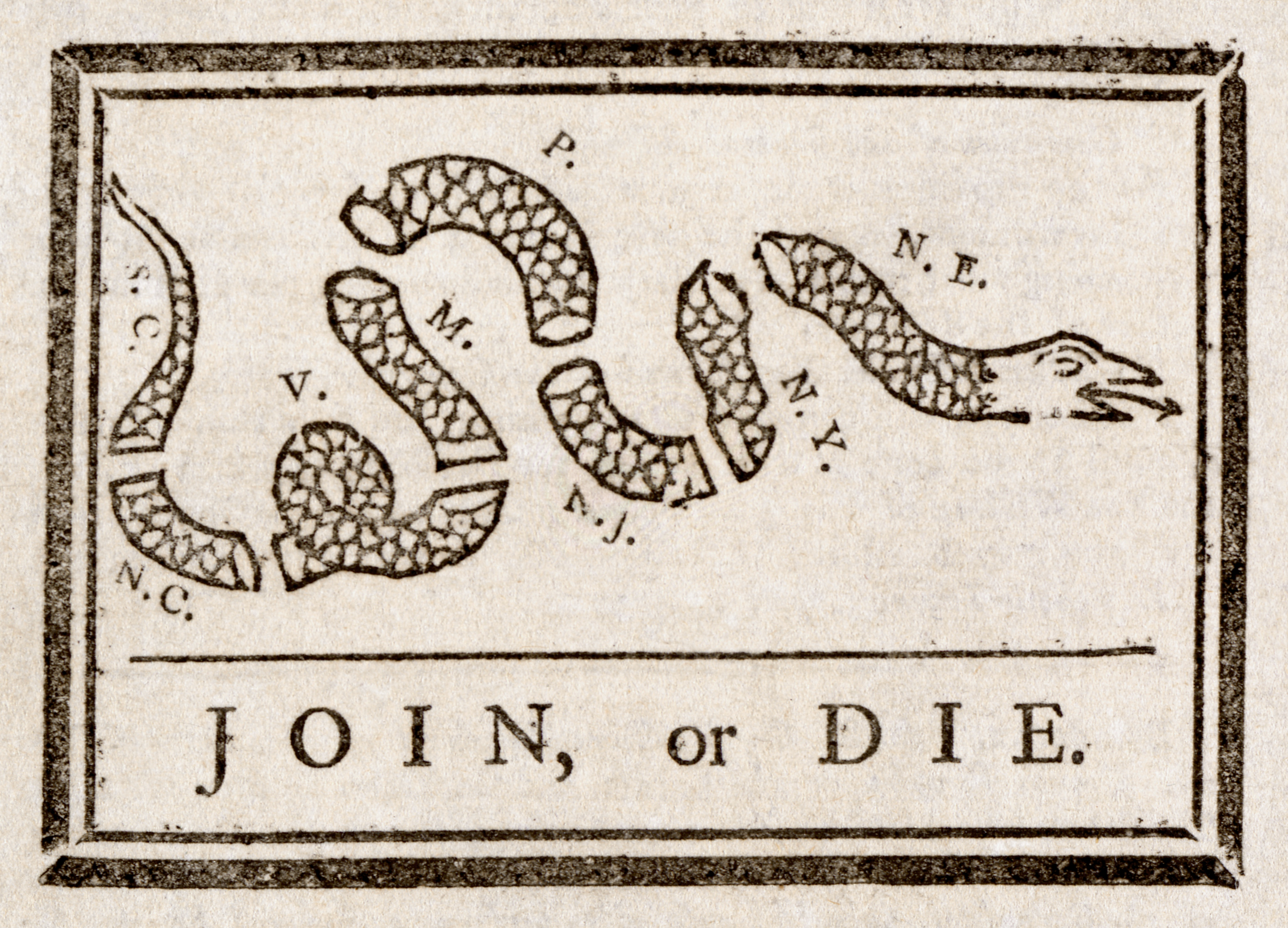
Join, or Die, the cartoon by Benjamin Franklin which was the inspiration behind the Union's brand

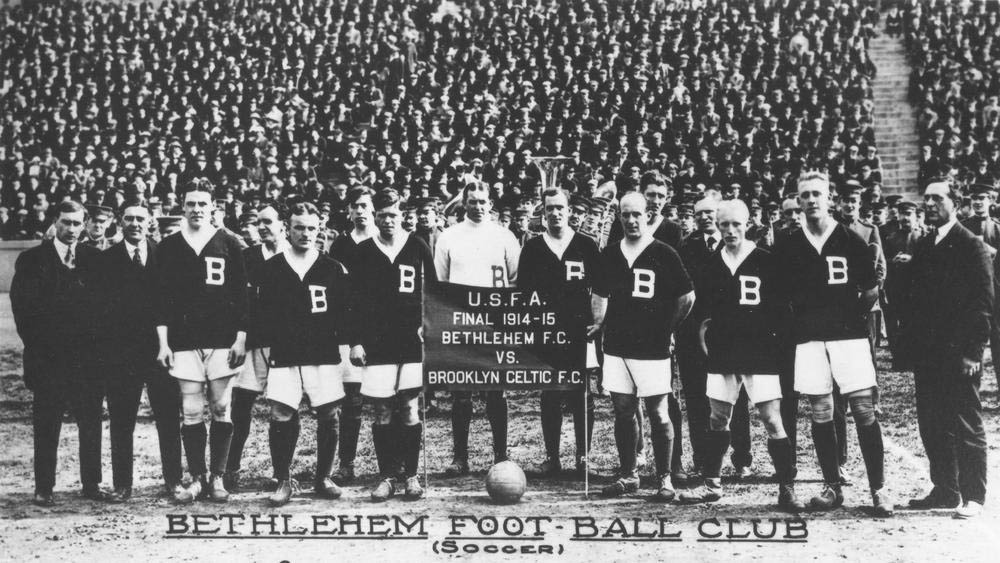
The Bethlehem Steel F.C. (pictured before 1915 U.S. Open Cup) was one of the most successful early American soccer clubs in the 20th century

On May 11, 2009, the Philadelphia Union's name, crest, and colors were officially announced during a ceremony held at Philadelphia City Hall. "Union" alludes to the union of the Thirteen Colonies, of which Philadelphia was the first capital as well as the area's historic role with the labor movement. The name was chosen following a fan poll held between January 19, 2009, and February 6, 2009; the other three options were AC Philadelphia, SC Philadelphia, and Philadelphia City.

The Union's colors are navy blue and gold, representing the primary colors of the Continental Army's uniforms during the American Revolutionary War. The team's crest is circular, symbolizing unity. Its thirteen gold stars represent the original Thirteen Colonies, while the shield's contour derives from the Philadelphia coat of arms. The rattlesnake pays homage to the "Join, or Die" political cartoon by Benjamin Franklin that was featured in the 1754 Pennsylvania Gazette, and is also reminiscent of the Gadsden flag, another Revolutionary icon. The light blue in the middle of the crest is a tribute to the Sons of Ben, and is further derived from the civic flag of Philadelphia. Coincidentally, the navy blue, gold, and light blue colors of the Union are also the predominant colors in the state flags of Pennsylvania, New Jersey, and Delaware. The team's secondary logo is a simplified version of the aforementioned design consisting of the blue shield with the rattlesnake, augmented with a gold border and a ribbon bearing the team's official motto: "jungite aut perite", a Latin translation of the phrase "join or die", which was also used in the 1754 Benjamin Franklin political cartoon mentioned above. The Philadelphia Union's name and colors also allude to the state's important role during the Civil War.

In February 2013, the team unveiled a third uniform that commemorated Bethlehem Steel F.C., one of the most successful early American soccer clubs. The kit was primarily black with white trim, featuring a sublimated Union emblem, and a Bethlehem Steel F.C. jock tag.

=== Sponsorship ===
On January 11, 2011, the Philadelphia Union announced a four-year agreement with Bimbo Bakeries USA to be its official jersey sponsor. The company's U.S. headquarters is located in the Philadelphia suburb of Horsham, thus providing local and global exposure to the team. It was also announced that Bimbo will be the official bread and baked goods partner of both the Union and Major League Soccer, as well as an overall league sponsor. The sponsorship deal is valued at about $12 million.

Bimbo and the Union agreed in 2014 to renew their sponsorship arrangement for five years at an annual value of $2.3 million. In January 2023, Bimbo Bakeries USA, and the Union agreed on a new multi year partnership, extending their sponsorship once more. The renewed partnership includes the company's subsidiary brand, Thomas' as the additional sponsor for the club's secondary and alternative jerseys.

On November 26, 2014, the Union announced the Milton, Delaware-based Dogfish Head Brewery as their official beer sponsor. The deal included the establishment of a beer garden at Subaru Park.

| Period | Kit manufacturer | Shirt sponsor | Sleeve sponsor |
|---|---|---|---|
| 2010 | Adidas | — | |
| 2011–2019 | Adidas | Bimbo | — |
| 2020–2021 | Adidas | Bimbo | Subaru |
| 2022 | Adidas | Bimbo | – |
| 2023 | Adidas | Bimbo / Thomas' | – |
| 2024–present | Adidas | Bimbo / Thomas' | Independence Blue Cross |

== Stadium ==
- Subaru Park; Chester, Pennsylvania (2010–present)
- Lincoln Financial Field; Philadelphia (2010)

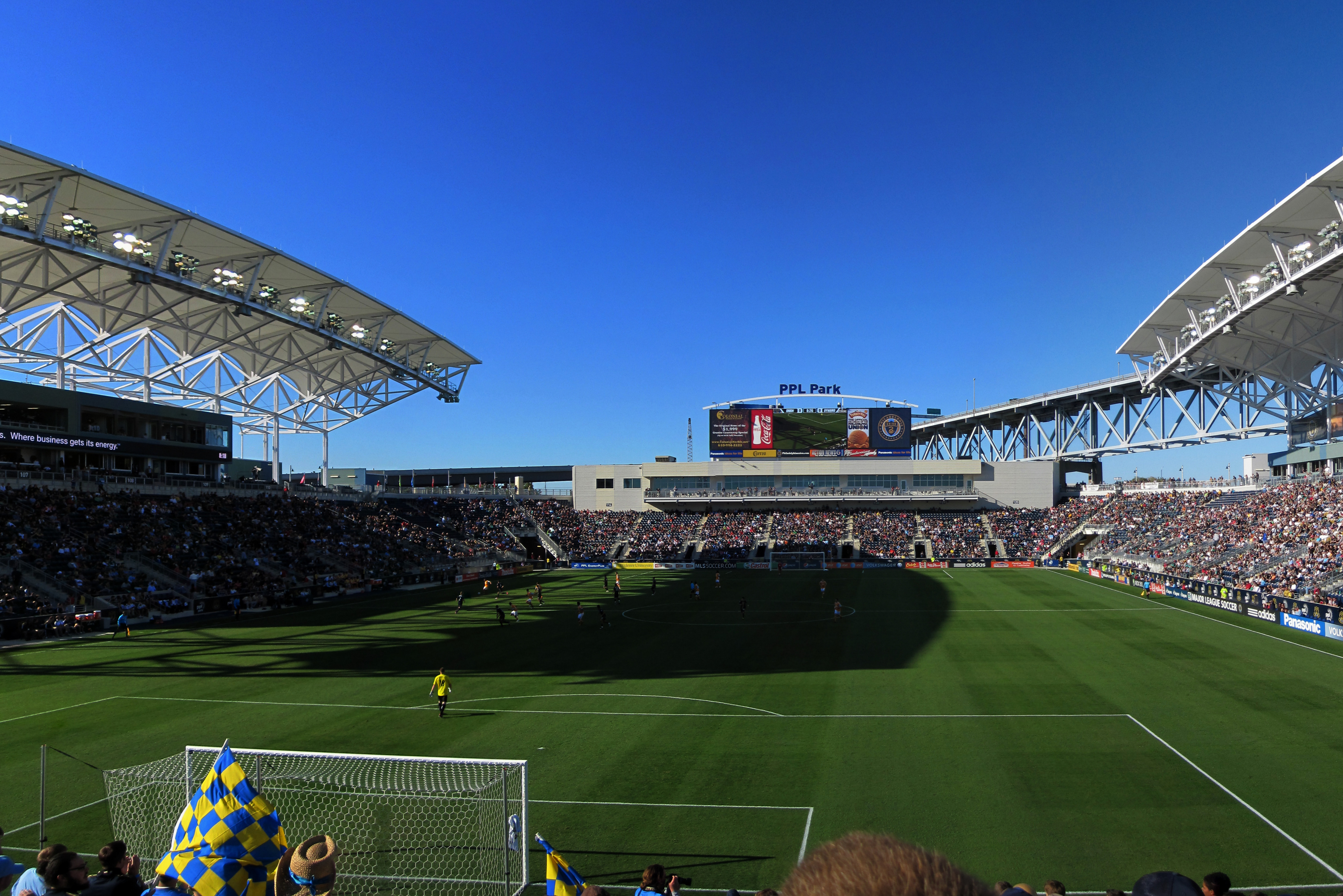
A view of Subaru Park from the River End supporters' section

The Union play most of their games at Subaru Park (formerly Talen Energy Stadium, and prior to that PPL Park), an 18,500-seat soccer-specific stadium located at the southwesterly corner of the Commodore Barry Bridge (U.S. Route 322). The structure was designed by Rossetti Architects and the ICON Venue Group, with the actual construction contracted to the Ardmore-based T.N. Ward Company. Subaru Park's design allows clear views of the Delaware River for approximately sixty percent of its spectators, and is the centerpiece of Chester's urban renewal process. The Environmental Protection Agency (EPA) worked with the city of Chester to ensure that construction activities did not impact the nearby parking facility which had been the site of the Wade Dump, a previously polluted Superfund site. Ahead of the 2025 season, Subaru Park underwent upgrades to enhance the matchday experience. A fully new sound system was installed, replacing original speakers and adding extra ones outside the stadium gates for clearer audio throughout the venue. Additional improvements include new premium seating, expanded hospitality spaces, and a wider selection of food and beverage options, all aimed at improving the overall atmosphere for fans.

In addition to Subaru Park, the Union also plays select games at Lincoln Financial Field, the home stadium of the NFL's Philadelphia Eagles and the NCAA's Temple University Owls football team. Prior to the completion of the then PPL Park, the Union played their home opener at Lincoln Financial Field on April 10, 2010, against D.C. United as well as their May 15 match against FC Dallas. Originally just scheduled to play only the home opener at Lincoln Financial Field, the second game was played there due to construction delays at Subaru Park. Lincoln Financial Field remains the team's secondary home, for matches with anticipated high attendances, such as a friendly against Manchester United, during their 2010 tour of North America. For the home opener, the team limited ticket sales to the lower bowl and club sections, totaling about 37,500 seats. On June 27, the Union officially opened their home with a 3–2 win over Seattle Sounders FC. Lincoln Financial Field also hosts international friendlies and was a venue for the 2025 FIFA Club World Cup. It also hosted six matches during the 2026 FIFA World Cup, including one round of 16 match.

=== Training facility ===
The Philadelphia Union training fields are right outside Subaru Park; Chester, Pennsylvania. The training complex features 2 grass fields that were constructed in fall 2014. Prior to having dedicated training fields, the Union was practicing at a nearby municipal park called Chester Park or directly at Subaru Park.

In 2016, the Philadelphia Union opened a 16,500 square foot training facility and offices built in the former machine shop of the Chester Waterside Station of the Philadelphia Electric Company.

In February 2023, the club announced WSFS Bank Sportsplex, a new $55 million indoor-outdoor training facility scheduled to open in 2024. The 170,000 square foot complex includes a 100,000 square foot indoor facility featuring a FIFA-regulation indoor pitch, two artificial turf fields, a 20,000 square foot performance center, and will serve as the permanent home for the Philadelphia Union Academy and Philadelphia Union II. Located adjacent to Subaru Park, the facility represents one of the largest investments in a MLS training facility to date and will be used year-round for both professional and youth development.

In July of 2025, the club officially opened WSFS Bank Sportsplex. Officially listed at 32 acres, the Sportsplex is expected to bring in more than 500,000 annual visitors and create a $90 million impact over the next decade.

== Youth development ==
=== Second team ===
On August 19, 2015, the team announced that they would operate a reserve team in Bethlehem, Pennsylvania that will compete in the United Soccer League (USL) starting in 2016 with matches being played at Lehigh University's Goodman Stadium. As a part of the announcement, the Union agreed to dissolve their partnership with the Harrisburg City Islanders.

On October 27, 2015, Bethlehem Steel FC's name, crest, and colors were officially announced during a ceremony held at the ArtsQuest at SteelStacks. "Steel FC", chosen in a public poll, alludes to the historical Bethlehem Steel F.C. soccer club, which played from 1907 to 1930. The team were unable to stay in the Lehigh Valley due to stadium requirements and moved to the Union's home stadium in 2018. In December 2019, the Union announced that the Bethlehem Steel identity would be retired ahead of the 2020 season and the club would become known as Philadelphia Union II. The team moved from USL to MLS Next Pro, a new reserve league in the third division, in the inaugural 2022 season.

=== Philadelphia Union Academy (Union III) ===
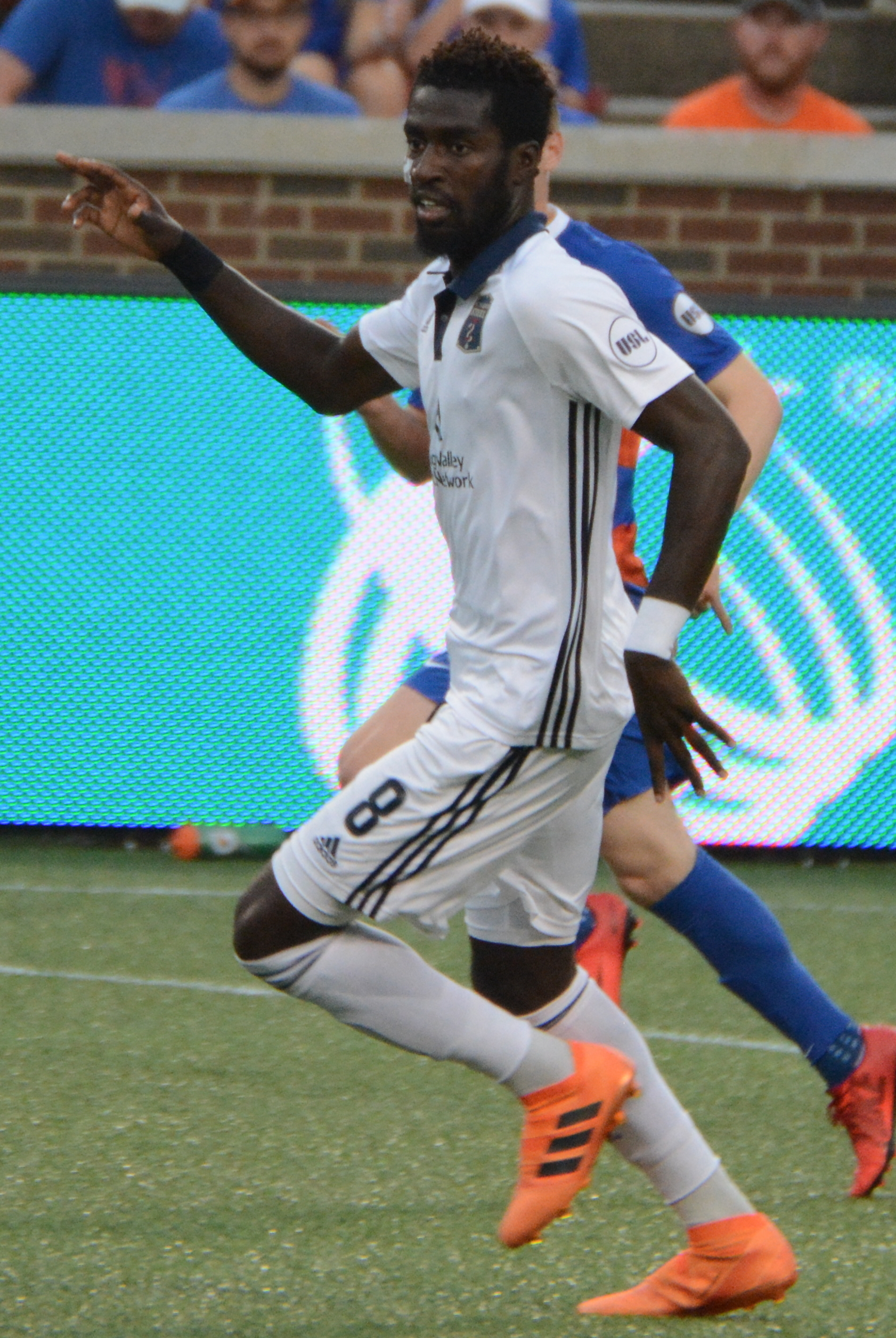
Former academy player Derrick Jones also played for Philadelphia Union II from 2016 to 2019

The Philadelphia Union operates a youth academy with training and competition program starting in the under-9 age group and running through under-17, after which players graduate to Union II, the Union's reserve team. The academy fields teams in the national MLS Next development system beginning in the under-13 age group; younger teams are placed in regional leagues and tournaments. The Union Academy teams train and compete in Wayne, Pennsylvania, as well as in Chester, Pennsylvania, home of Philadelphia Union's first team organization.

While the Union's competition rosters in MLS Next are composed of boys teams representing age groups Under-13 through Under-17, the Union Academy is unusual in that with many of its young players are competing with and even starting for the Union's USL Championship team, Union II. Widely considered one of the top youth academies affiliated with an MLS club, the Union Academy has seen success in tournaments both domestic and international.

The Philadelphia Union Academy has produced numerous players for the Philadelphia Union, Union II, elite NCAA programs, and professional clubs across the world. Philadelphia Union midfielder Quinn Sullivan made club history by becoming the first Homegrown player to reach 100 MLS appearances. Sullivan, who signed as a Homegrown player in 2020, debuted for the Union on May 1, 2021, against New York City FC. His first start came six weeks later, highlighted by a bicycle-kick goal against Chicago Fire. Sullivan's progression through the Union Academy and Union II led to a breakout 2024 season, where he recorded double-digit assists and joined an elite group of young MLS playmakers. His younger brothers Ronan, Declan and Cavan would go on to play for the club. On MLS Decision Day 2024, he became the Union's youngest player to achieve 10 goals and 10 assists in a single season. The academy has also produced several players who have successfully transitioned to European leagues. Brenden Aaronson moved to Red Bull Salzburg in 2021, where he quickly became a key player before transferring to Leeds United in 2022. Mark McKenzie, another Union Academy graduate, signed with Genk in Belgium in 2021, where he established himself as a reliable defender. His performances in the Belgian Pro League earned him international recognition, claiming his role in the U.S. Men's National Team. Another Union Academy graduate that has gone on to sign with a European team was Paxten Aaronson in 2022, signing with Bundesliga team Eintracht Frankfurt. Paxten has gone on to make a move back to Major League Soccer with the Colorado Rapids.

==== UPSL ====
In late 2022 it was announced that the Union would enter a team in the United Premier Soccer League for the Fall 2022 season with home games played at YSC Sports in Wayne, PA. Philadelphia Union UDS (Union Development Squad) competed in the Northeast Division of the American Conference, finishing the regular season with a record of 9–0–3 and qualifying for the postseason. UDS fell in the American Conference final to New Jersey Alliance FC in a penalty kick shootout.

In February 2023, the Union Development Squad joined the National Premier Soccer League for the 2023 season. The team was placed in the Keystone East Conference.

=== YSC Academy ===
Between 70 and 80 of the Philadelphia Union Academy's players attend private school YSC Academy, which was founded by Philadelphia Union investor Richie Graham in September 2013. It was the first soccer-specific school for elite soccer players from grades 7 through 12 to be opened by an MLS team. The school is located at the Union's training complex in Chester, Pennsylvania and is designed for student-athletes who aspire to play professional-level soccer. YSC Academy's first graduating class was in 2015. A substantial portion of the school's graduates have gone on to play professionally for the Philadelphia Union and other teams, with the balance going to college.

== Club culture ==
=== Supporters ===
Grassroots support was instrumental to the founding of the Philadelphia Union and the construction of Subaru Park. This backing came in the form of a supporters group known as the Sons of Ben, which was founded in January 2007. The Sons of Ben petitioned Major League Soccer to expand to the Philadelphia market until the official expansion announcement was made in January 2008. Named for Founding Father and Philadelphia icon, Benjamin Franklin, the group was included in the expansion press conference, singing their anthem, "I'm Looking Over a Four Leaf Clover", and closing the event by presenting scarves to the ownership group. They were also present on May 11, 2009, for the naming ceremony at City Hall. The Sons of Ben emphasize four main principles, be loud, be proud, be smart, and be passionate. Supporters are expected be fully engaged and create an intimidating atmosphere for opponents while avoiding violent, sexist, racist, or homophobic behavior.

The Sons of Ben are the predominant supporters group, along with the Doopin' Delinquents. Both are officially recognized by the Independent Supporters Council as official supporters groups of the Philadelphia Union. Smaller supporters groups also exist. These include the Tammany Saints (sections 101 and 133), the IllegitimateS (section 133), the Corner Creeps (section 134), the Bridge Crew (sections 120–121), La Union Latina (section 114), The Keystone State Ultras (section 140), and the Chester Soccer Casuals (section 140).

The supporters' culture has grown significantly since the team's founding, with the Sons of Ben reaching over 4,000 members by 2023. The group has become known for their distinctive tifo displays, including a notable 20,000 square foot display for the 2023 MLS Cup Eastern Conference Final. The various supporters groups collaborate on match day activities, charity initiatives, and the annual 'Help Kick Hunger' fundraiser, which has raised over $100,000 for Chester community food programs since its inception.

=== Rivalries ===
The Philadelphia Union's primary rivals are the New York Red Bulls and New York City FC. These rivalries exist primarily because of geographical proximity and the traditional animosities between the metropolitan areas of Philadelphia and New York City in other professional sports leagues.

Most Union fans consider the New York Red Bulls to be a rival due to the team's stadium being the closest in proximity to the Union's, leading to substantial away support from each team's fan bases every time the two sides play. There have been many consequential games played between the two sides, including the Union's first playoff win in team history. However, many New York Red Bulls fans do not consider the Union to be one of their main rivals, as NYCFC and D.C. United are their main antagonists.

In recent years, the Philadelphia Union's most meaningful rivalry has been with New York City FC. Though early fixtures between the two clubs did spark tensions between the two sets of fans, the rivalry reached a new level after New York City controversially eliminated the Union in the 2021 Eastern Conference Final, after the latter lost 11 players, including six starters, due to MLS's COVID-19 protocols. The Union would avenge their 2021 Eastern Conference final loss, defeating NYCFC 3–1 at home to win the 2022 Eastern Conference final, and earn their first ever appearance in an MLS Cup final. On October 5, 2025, the Philadelphia Union would beat NYCFC 1-0 at home to clinch the Supporters' Shield for the second time in their history. The two would meet again that year in the Eastern Conference Semifinal of the MLS Cup, with defeating the Union at Subaru Park 1-0 to knock them out.

The Union also has several other minor rivals. A smaller rivalry with D.C. United took shape early on due to their geographical proximity compared to other teams in the league. Other teams such as the New England Revolution and Atlanta United FC have been considered rivals to some extent due to many intense and important games against them, and some controversial moments. The Union have also had eras of rivalries with the Seattle Sounders and LAFC, despite playing in different MLS conferences.

FC Cincinnati is another rivalry that has intensified in recent years due to multiple high-profile departures from Philadelphia to Cincinnati. The former Union assistant coach, Pat Noonan became the head coach of Cincinnati in 2022, while Chris Albright, an important figure in Philadelphia's front office, took over as the general manager of Cincinnati. As well as several key players making the switch over, which fueled more competitive tension between the clubs. Matches between these clubs have become increasingly intense with both teams competing in the Eastern Conference.

== Broadcasting ==
Until the 2022 season, WPHL-TV and WPVI-TV were the main English-language television broadcasters for Union matches not carried by Major League Soccer's national media partners, with JP Dellacamera on play-by-play. The broadcasts were produced by WPVI, and part of the package was aired by the station. Prior to the 2018 season, CSN Philadelphia (now NBC Sports Philadelphia) produced the games for 6ABC, removing the NBC peacock from its graphics.

During the 2012 MLS season, seventeen select home and road matches were broadcast on radio by WIP. The Union also collaborated with WIP on a weekly hour-long soccer show. Beginning with the MLS is Back Tournament in July 2020, the Union moved to WDAS. Since 2023 97.5 The Fanatic has broadcast the Union's MLS matches on the radio.

From 2023, every Union match is available via MLS Season Pass on the Apple TV app. The Apple TV MLS package eliminates blackout restrictions, allowing fans to watch games anywhere with a subscription. Additionally, Union season ticket holders receive free access to the Apple TV MLS package. Apple TV's partnership with MLS could enhance sports betting by incorporating real-time analytics into broadcasts such as player movements, possession percentages, expected goals, and other stats.

== Players ==
=== Current roster ===
As of August 28, 2026

Note: Flags indicate national team as defined under FIFA eligibility rules; some limited exceptions apply. Players may hold more than one non-FIFA nationality.

| No. | Pos. | Nation | Player |
|---|---|---|---|
| 2 | DF | COL | Geiner Martínez |
| 4 | MF | SRB | Jovan Lukić |
| 5 | DF | DEN | Japhet Sery Larsen |
| 6 | MF | USA | Cavan Sullivan (HG) |
| 8 | MF | VEN | Jesús Bueno |
| 9 | FW | URU | Bruno Damiani |
| 10 | FW | USA | Milan Iloski |
| 11 | MF | USA | Alejandro Bedoya |
| 14 | MF | USA | Jeremy Rafanello (HG) |
| 16 | MF | USA | Ben Bender |
| 18 | GK | JAM | Andre Blake |
| 19 | MF | USA | Indiana Vassilev |
| 20 | DF | CGO | Philippe Ndinga |

| No. | Pos. | Nation | Player |
|---|---|---|---|
| 21 | MF | HAI | Danley Jean Jacques |
| 23 | FW | GHA | Ezekiel Alladoh |
| 26 | DF | USA | Nathan Harriel (HG) |
| 27 | DF | GER | Kai Wagner |
| 28 | FW | USA | Agustin Anello |
| 31 | GK | USA | George Marks |
| 33 | MF | USA | Quinn Sullivan (HG) |
| 39 | DF | USA | Frankie Westfield (HG) |
| 44 | DF | USA | Neil Pierre (HG) |
| 51 | FW | USA | Malik Jakupović (HG) |
| 55 | FW | MEX | Sal Olivas (HG) |
| 66 | DF | USA | Finn Sundstrum |
| 76 | GK | USA | Andrew Rick (HG) |

=== Players out on loan ===
Note: Flags indicate national team as defined under FIFA eligibility rules; some limited exceptions apply. Players may hold more than one non-FIFA nationality.

| No. | Pos. | Nation | Player |
|---|---|---|---|
| 17 | MF | USA | CJ Olney (HG; on loan to Brooklyn FC) |
| 35 | FW | USA | Markus Anderson (on loan to Lyngby) |
| 37 | FW | USA | Stas Korzeniowski (on loan to Rhode Island FC) |
| 77 | FW | USA | Eddy Davis III (HG; on loan to Loudoun United) |

== Management ==
=== Current staff ===
| Position | Staff | Nationality |
|---|---|---|
| Head coach | Ryan Richter (interim) | United States |
| Assistant Coach | Frank Leicht | Germany |
| Assistant Coach | Fred da Silva (interim) | Brazil |
| Assistant Coach / Director of Goalkeeping | Phil Wheddon | United Kingdom |
| Assistant Coach | Ben Moane | United States |
| Interim Analyst and Assistant Coach | Henry Apaloo | United Kingdom |
| Director of Video Coaching and Coaching Technology | Jay Cooney | United States |
| Head Athletic Trainer | Paul Rushing | United States |
| Team Coordinator | Josh Gros | United States |
| Sporting Director | Jon Scheer | United States |
| Assistant Sporting Director | Matt Ratajczak | United States |
| Academy Director | Paul Killian | United States |

=== Head coaches ===
This list includes all those who have managed the club since 2010, when the club joined Major League Soccer for the first time, whether coaching on a full-time or interim basis. Games played include all League, Cup, Playoff and continental matches, and the win percentage is calculated from the total of games.

As of May 27, 2026. Includes all competitive matches.

M = Matches played; W = Matches won; D = Matches drawn; L = Matches lost;

| Coach | Nat. | Tenure | M | W | D | L | Win % | Notes |
|---|---|---|---|---|---|---|---|---|
| Piotr Nowak | Poland | May 28, 2009 – June 13, 2012 | 78 | 22 | 32 | 24 | 28.21% | – |
| John Hackworth | United States | June 13, 2012 – June 10, 2014 | 77 | 25 | 20 | 32 | 32.47% | Interim coach through August 30, 2012 |
| Jim Curtin | United States | June 10, 2014 – November 7, 2024 | 321 | 137 | 79 | 105 | 42.68% | Interim coach through November 7, 2014 |
| Bradley Carnell | South Africa | January 2, 2025 – May 27, 2026 | 60 | 28 | 11 | 21 | 46.67% | – |

=== Sporting directors ===
| Name | Nation | Tenure | Notes |
|---|---|---|---|
| Diego Gutierrez | COL | December 2010 – July 1, 2012 | As Head of Scouting/Player Development |
| Nick Sakiewicz | USA | 2012 – October 2, 2015 | As CEO and Operating Partner supported by Chris Albright as Technical Director |
| Earnie Stewart | USA | October 26, 2015 – July 31, 2018 | Appointed Sporting Director |
| Ernst Tanner | GER | August 9, 2018 – present | Appointed Sporting Director |

=== Ownership ===
Keystone Sports & Entertainment (S&E) owns the Philadelphia Union. Jay Sugarman, (CEO) of iStar Financial, leads this group including Christopher F. Buccini, Robert Buccini, and David B. Pollin – co-founders of the Buccini/Pollin Group; Joseph J. Greco, chairman of the RevSpring technology company and president of Premier Management Services; and David Seltzer, principal and co-founder of the Mercator financial advisors. Nick Sakiewicz was the former CEO and investor in Keystone S&E until October 3, 2015, when Sugarman purchased his shares in the club and discontinued his involvement. His termination was primarily due to his strained relationship with the Union's fanbase, which blamed Sakiewicz for the team's mediocre record.

On June 15, 2020, it was announced that basketball player Kevin Durant had become an investor and community partner for the club, purchasing five percent of the club with potentially another five percent in the near future. Through his company, Thirty Five Ventures, Durant has helped grow the Union's brand visibility in the broader sports world. He has committed to supporting youth soccer programs, helping expand access to training and facilities for underserved communities. Durant was drawn to the Union's coaching staff, leadership, and club philosophy, stating that he "connected instantly" with their vision.

== Honors ==
Domestic
| Competitions | Titles | Seasons |
| Supporters' Shield | 2 | 2020, 2025 |
| Eastern Conference (Playoff) | 1 | 2022 |
| Eastern Conference (Regular Season) | 3 | 2020, 2022, 2025 |

== Team records ==
=== Year-by-year ===
This is a partial list of the last five seasons completed by the Union. For the full season-by-season history, see List of Philadelphia Union seasons.

| Season | League | | | | | | | | | | | Position | | Playoffs | USOC | Continental / Other | | Average attendance | Top goalscorer(s) | |
| Season | Div | League | Pld | W | L | D | GF | GA | GD | Pts | PPG | Conf. | Overall | Playoffs | USOC | Continental / Other | | Average attendance | Name(s) | Goals |
|---|---|---|---|---|---|---|---|---|---|---|---|---|---|---|---|---|---|---|---|---|
| 2020 | 1 | MLS | 23 | 14 | 4 | 5 | 44 | 20 | +24 | 47 | 2.04 | 1st | 1st | R1 | NH | Leagues Cup MLS is Back Tournament | NH SF | 2,775 | (Brazil) Sérgio Santos | 11 |
| 2021 | 1 | MLS | 34 | 14 | 12 | 8 | 48 | 35 | +13 | 54 | 1.59 | 2nd | 6th | CF | NH | CCL | SF | 12,903 | (Poland) Kacper Przybyłko | 17 |
| 2022 | 1 | MLS | 34 | 19 | 5 | 10 | 74 | 26 | +46 | 67 | 1.97 | 1st | 2nd | RU | R32 | Leagues Cup | NH | 18,126 | (Hungary) Dániel Gazdag | 24 |
| 2023 | 1 | MLS | 34 | 15 | 10 | 9 | 57 | 41 | +16 | 55 | 1.62 | 4th | 5th | QF | R32 | SF | 3rd | 18,907 | (Hungary) Dániel Gazdag | 22 |
| 2024 | 1 | MLS | 34 | 9 | 10 | 15 | 62 | 55 | +7 | 37 | 1.08 | 12th | 22nd | DNQ | DNE | Ro16 | 4th | 18,881 | (Hungary) Dániel Gazdag | 19 |
| 2025 | 1 | MLS | 34 | 20 | 8 | 6 | 57 | 35 | +22 | 66 | 1.94 | 1st | 1st | SF | SF | DNQ | - | 18,331 | (Israel) Tai Baribo | 18 |

1. Avg. attendance include statistics from league matches only.
2. Top goalscorer(s) includes all goals scored in League, MLS Cup Playoffs, U.S. Open Cup, MLS is Back Tournament, CONCACAF Champions League, FIFA Club World Cup, and other competitive continental matches.

=== International competitions ===
| Competition | Season | Round | Opposition | Home | Away | Aggregate |
|---|---|---|---|---|---|---|
| CONCACAF Champions Cup | 2021 | Round of 16 | (Costa Rica) Deportivo Saprissa | 4–0 | 1–0 | 5–0 |
| CONCACAF Champions Cup | 2021 | Quarterfinals | (United States) Atlanta United FC | 1–1 | 3–0 | 4–1 |
| CONCACAF Champions Cup | 2021 | Semifinals | (Mexico) Club América | 0–2 | 0–2 | 0–4 |
| CONCACAF Champions Cup | 2023 | Round of 16 | (El Salvador) Alianza | 4–0 | 0–0 | 4–0 |
| CONCACAF Champions Cup | 2023 | Quarterfinals | (Mexico) Atlas | 1–0 | 2–2 | 3–2 |
| CONCACAF Champions Cup | 2023 | Semifinals | (United States) LAFC | 1–1 | 0–3 | 1–4 |
| CONCACAF Champions Cup | 2024 | Round One | (Costa Rica) Deportivo Saprissa | 3–3 | 3–2 | 6–5 |
| CONCACAF Champions Cup | 2024 | Round of 16 | (Mexico) C.F. Pachuca | 0–0 | 0–6 | 0–6 |
| CONCACAF Champions Cup | 2026 | Round One | (Trinidad and Tobago) Defence Force | 7-0 | 5–0 | 12-0 |
| CONCACAF Champions Cup | 2026 | Round of 16 | (Mexico) América | 0-1 | 1–1 | 1-2 |

== Player records ==
=== Most goals ===
As of February 22, 2025 (all competitive matches)

| Rank | Name | Years | Goals (Note: Includes Major League Soccer, MLS Cup Playoffs, MLS is Back Tournament, U.S. Open Cup, CONCACAF Champions League and Leagues Cup matches) |
|---|---|---|---|
| 1 | (Hungary) Dániel Gazdag | 2021–2025 | 71 |
| 2 | (France) Sébastien Le Toux | 2010–2011; 2013–2016 | 56 |
| 3 | (Argentina) Julián Carranza | 2022–2024 | 43 |
| 4 | (Poland) Kacper Przybyłko | 2018–2021 | 40 |
| 5 | (United States) C.J. Sapong | 2015–2019 | 38 |
| 5 | (Denmark) Mikael Uhre | 2022–2025 | 38 |
| 7 | (Jamaica) Cory Burke | 2018–2022 | 30 |
| 8 | (United States) **Alejandro Bedoya** | 2016– | 29 |
| 9 | (United States) Jack McInerney | 2010–2014 | 28 |
| 10 | (United States) Conor Casey | 2013–2015 | 22 |
| 10 | (Brazil) Ilsinho | 2016–2021 | 22 |
| 10 | (United States) Fafa Picault | 2017–2019 | 22 |
| 10 | (Brazil) Sergio Santos | 2019–2022 | 22 |

- **Bold** signifies current Union player

=== Other player records ===
As of February 22, 2025 Stats only include MLS regular season matches. These do not include domestic cup, international, or playoff matches.

**Field players**

- Games played: Alejandro Bedoya (245)
- Minutes played: Alejandro Bedoya (19,388)
- Goals: Dániel Gazdag (58)
- Assists: Kai Wagner (54)

**Goalkeepers**

- Games played: Andre Blake (246)
- Minutes played: Andre Blake (21,984)
- Shutouts: Andre Blake (76)

== See also ==
- All-time Philadelphia Union roster
- Sports in Philadelphia
