= Nick Sakiewicz =

Commissioner of the National Lacrosse League

5th Commissioner of National Lacrosse League
- In office January 7, 2016 – February 23, 2022
- Preceded by: George Daniel
- Succeeded by: Jessica Berman (acting)

Personal details
- Born: January 14, 1961 (age 65) Passaic, New Jersey
- Education: University of New Haven

Nicolaus Sakiewicz (/səˈkævɪtʃ/ sə-KAV-itch; born January 14, 1961) is the former chief business officer of the Arizona Coyotes of the National Hockey League. From January 7, 2016, until February 23, 2022, he was the commissioner of the National Lacrosse League.

Previously, Sakiewicz was a founder, operating partner and CEO of the Philadelphia Union and a former professional soccer goalkeeper. He is a 21-year veteran of Major League Soccer and was part of a small group of people that started the League in 1995.

Until October 2015, Sakiewicz was the CEO and Operating Partner of Keystone Sports & Entertainment, LLC, the ownership group of the Philadelphia Union. He played in both the Major Indoor Soccer League and American Professional Soccer League and coached at the youth and college levels. Sakiewicz has been the CEO of Hartford Athletic, a USL-Championship professional soccer club.

== Early life and playing career ==
Nick Sakiewicz
Personal information
- Date of birth: January 14, 1961 (age 65)
- Place of birth: Passaic, New Jersey
- Position: Goalkeeper

College career
Years	Team	Apps	(Gls)
1979–1982	New Haven Chargers		

Senior career*
Years	Team	Apps	(Gls)
	FC Nantes		(0)
1983–1984	New York Arrows (indoor)		(0)
1984	Belenenses	2	(0)
1990	Tampa Bay Rowdies	6	(0)

Managerial career
- Lynn Fighting Knights (assistant)
- * Club domestic league appearances and goals

Sakiewicz, the son of a Polish immigrant father and mother, attended the University of New Haven where he played on the school's NCAA Division II soccer team from 1979 to 1982. He was a 1981, 1982 and 1983 All New England and 1982 Division II Second Team All American goalkeeper. After graduating from New Haven, he moved to Europe where he played in FC Nantes as a developmental player. He also spent a short time with Belenenses of Portugal in 1984. He returned to the United States and played for the New York Arrows of the Major Indoor Soccer League during the 1983–1984 season. He spent an extended hiatus from the professional game after a serious leg injury and pursued business opportunities, continuing with the game by coaching and playing at the amateur level. In 1990, he returned to the professional game for one season with the Tampa Bay Rowdies of the American Professional Soccer League. Following his retirement as a player, Sakiewicz coached youth soccer in Florida and was an assistant coach with the College of Boca Raton. In the late 1980s, Sakiewicz was a co-owner of the South Florida-based Ezell-Titterton Inc.

== Major League Soccer ==
In 1995, Sakeiwicz joined Major League Soccer as a founding executive and was named the first Vice President of Commercial Sponsorship Sales for the league. During his tenure as an MLS executive, Sakiewicz helped grow the league from ten teams in 1996 to 23 teams before leaving for the NLL in late 2015.

=== Tampa Bay Mutiny ===
In October 1996, he became the President and General Manager of the Tampa Bay Mutiny, and was named MLS Executive of the Year in 1999.

=== New York MetroStars ===
In 2000, he left to become president and General Manager of the MetroStars and won a second consecutive MLS executive of the year after the MetroStars finished atop the Eastern Division in the regular season. Over five seasons the MetroStars appeared in the 2003 U.S. Open Cup final and qualified for the MLS playoffs four times, but only won one playoff series. The team improved their sponsorship revenue and local broadcasting contracts under his management. Sakiewicz helped engineer the deal the build a soccer-specific stadium, Red Bull Arena.

During the 2005 season, Sakiewicz was promoted to President of AEG New York, LLC, where he oversaw the record-breaking $100 million sale of the MetroStars to Red Bull Energy Drink Company in 2006. In November 2007 he left AEG to become the co-founder and CEO of the Philadelphia Union, which were announced as the 16th MLS franchise in February 2008 and began play in 2010.

=== Philadelphia Union ===
Sakiewicz led all efforts in planning and construction of the Union's soccer-specific stadium PPL Park, including securing naming rights and other key sponsorships.

On October 2, 2015, Sakiewicz was removed from his duties as CEO and Operating Partner of the Philadelphia Union. Majority owner Jay Sugarman cited a difference in philosophy regarding the management of the franchise as the reason for his dismissal. Sakiewicz had also developed a contentious relationship with fans and the local media. In May 2015 he was the target of a protest by Philadelphia Union fans at PPL Park. Following his dismissal, allegations arose that Sakiewicz had threatened members of the local media with libel suits for their reporting on the franchise.

On January 7, 2016, Sakiewicz was introduced as the fifth commissioner in the history of the National Lacrosse League.

== National Lacrosse League ==
Since taking over as commissioner, Sakiewicz has partnered with Twitter to live stream select games, increased ticket sales and led the way in launching NLL TV. In March 2018, Sakiewicz secured the largest media rights deal in the history of the league, partnering with B/R Live, Turner's live streaming service, for all games to be streamed on the platform starting with the 2018–2019 season.

Under Sakiewicz's watch, the league has seen attendance growth for three consecutive years and games routinely average 10,000 fans per game.

Sakiewicz's biggest impact has come with league expansion. The last time the league added expansion franchises before Sakiewicz took over as commissioner was in 2007, when the Chicago Shamrox and the New York Titans joined the league. Starting with the 2008 season, the league saw continued consolidation, with the league going from 13 teams in 2007 to nine teams in 2012.

Under his watch, the NLL has grown back to 13 teams, and Sakiewicz has repeatedly stated his intention to grow the league by two teams per year to eventually reach 20–30 teams.

Sakiewicz's biggest initiative for expansion franchises is to get what he calls "blue-chip owners" in the league, with teams who have favorable arena deals and to be in a good sports and entertainment market.

The first team to be announced as an expansion franchise was the San Diego Seals on August 30, 2007. Joseph Tsai, co-founder of the Chinese e-commerce platform Alibaba Group, was announced as the ownership group. Two weeks later, on September 14, 2017, the NLL awarded an expansion franchise to Comcast Spectacor to return the Wings to Philadelphia. Tsai and Comcast each paid a reported $5 million for their expansion franchises.

On September 13, 2018, Sakiewicz announced that the Rochester KnightHawks would be moving to Halifax, Nova Scotia for the 2019–2020 season. Rochester will be awarded an expansion franchise under the ownership of Terry and Kim Pegula, who also own the Buffalo Bandits.

On December 11, 2018, Sakiewicz announced that New York would be awarded an expansion franchise to begin play during the 2019–2020 season. The team will play at the newly renovated NYCB LIVE, home of the Nassau Veterans Memorial Coliseum, and will be owned by live events and sports media entertainment company GF Sports

Sakiewicz also oversaw the sale and move of the Vancouver Stealth from previous owner, Denise Watkins, to the Canucks Sports & Entertainment group. The Stealth moved from Langley Events Centre to the Rogers Arena and were rebranded as the Vancouver Warriors, starting with the 2018–2019 season.

On February 23, 2022, the NLL announced that Sakiewicz "has decided to leave his current position (as NLL Commissioner) to pursue other interests but will continue to advise the league until June 30, 2022".
