= 1997 New England Revolution season =

American soccer club season

New England Revolution
1997 season
- Owner: Robert Kraft (The Kraft Group)
- Head coach: Thomas Rongen
- Stadium: Foxboro Stadium; Foxborough, Massachusetts
- MLS: Conference: 4th Overall: 8th
- MLS Cup Playoffs: Conference Semifinals
- U.S. Open Cup: Third Round
- Highest home attendance: League/All: 57,407 (4/20 v. Tampa Bay Mutiny)
- Lowest home attendance: League: 10,242 (6/01 v. Dallas Burn); All: 2,031 (7/31 v. Long Island Rough Riders, USOC)
- Average home league attendance: 21,298
- Biggest win: League/All: New England Revolution 4–2 Tampa Bay Mutiny (7/18)
- Biggest defeat: League/All: New England Revolution 5–1 San Jose Clash (8/3)

The 1997 New England Revolution season was the second season for the New England Revolution both as a club and in Major League Soccer (MLS). Along with the MLS regular season, the team made their debut in both the U.S. Open Cup and the MLS Cup Playoffs, although they failed to advance in either. The season began on March 29 with a 1–0 away win over the Dallas Burn, and concluded with a home shootout loss to D.C. United in the MLS Cup Playoffs on October 8. The 1997 season marked the first season with goalkeeper Walter Zenga, who would later be elevated to player-manager in the 1998 season after the departure of head coach Thomas Rongen.

== Transfers ==
=== Transfers In ===
Date	Position	No.	Name	From	Fee/notes	Ref.
February 20	FW	11	(Mozambique) Chiquinho Conde	(Portugal) Vitoria de Setubal	League Allocation	
March 4	GK	1	(Italy) Walter Zenga	(Italy) Calcio Padova	League Allocation	
March 6	DF	6	(Argentina) Leonardo Squadrone	(Argentina) Estudiantes de La Plata	League Allocation	
March 10	DF	25	(Argentina) Alejandro Farías	(Argentina) Boca Juniors	Discovery Player	
May 9	DF	3	(United States) Erik Imler	(United States) D.C. United	Claimed off Waivers	
June 5	FW	23	(United States) Rob Jachym	(United States) Columbus Crew	Signed	
June 5	DF	2	(United States) Brian Dunseth	(United States) Cal State Fullerton	Allocated from MLS Project-40	
July 10	MF	11	(Trinidad and Tobago) Evans Wise	(United States) Tampa Bay Mutiny	Trade for Bill Harte	
July 16	GK	26	(United States) Jeff Causey	(United States) D.C. United	Signed	
August 13	FW	33	(Italy) Giuseppe Galderisi	(United States) Tampa Bay Mutiny	Trade for Chiquinho Conde and Sam George	
August 13	MF	7	(South Africa) Ivan McKinley	(United States) Tampa Bay Mutiny	Trade for Chiquinho Conde and Sam George	

=== Transfers Out ===
Date	Position	No.	Name	To	Fee/notes	Ref.
March 3	MF	6	(Canada) Geoff Aunger		Waived	
March 3	MF	13	(Canada) Mark Watson		Waived	
March 5	FW	-	(United States) J.T. Roberts		Waived	
March 10	FW	11	(United States) Wélton	(United States) LA Galaxy	Traded for the Galaxy's first-round pick in the 1998 MLS Supplemental Draft	
March 10	DF	3	(United States) Iain Fraser		Waived	
March 10	GK	32	(England) Aidan Heaney		Waived	
March 10	GK	8	(United States) Peter Woodring		Waived	
March 17	MF	14	(United States) John DeBrito		Waived	
April 15	FW	24	(Nigeria) Patrick Olalere		Waived	
May 7	FW	19	(United States) Steve Klein		Waived	
May 28	DF	9	(United States) Kevin Wylie		Waived	
June 24	DF	17	(United States) Greg Lalas		Waived	
July 10	DF	2	(United States) Bill Harte	(United States) Tampa Bay Mutiny	Traded in exchange for Evans Wise	
August 13	FW	22	(Mozambique) Chiquinho Conde	(United States) Tampa Bay Mutiny	Traded in exchange for Giuseppe Galderisi and Ivan McKinley	
August 13	MF	14	(United States) Sam George	(United States) Tampa Bay Mutiny	Traded in exchange for Giuseppe Galderisi and Ivan McKinley	
November 6	DF	20	(Nigeria) Francis Okaroh	(United States) Chicago Fire	Claimed in the 7th round of the 1997 MLS Expansion Draft	
November 13	MF	25	(Argentina) Alejandro Farías		Waived	
November 13	FW	33	(Italy) Giuseppe Galderisi		Waived	
November 13	MF	3	(United States) Erik Imler		Waived	
November 13	FW	9	(United States) John Kerr Jr.		Waived	
November 13	MF	7	(United States) Darren Sawatzky		Waived	

=== Draft results ===
==== College draft ====
The Revolution traded their first-round pick to the Tampa Bay Mutiny in exchange for the singing of former Mutiny coach Thomas Rongen. In addition, the team acquired an additional third-round pick and a first-round selection (#3) in the 1997 MLS Supplemental Draft from the Dallas Burn in exchange for a first-round selection (#2) in the 1997 Supplemental Draft.

On February 2, 1997, the Revolution selected Scott Coufal, Steve Klein, and J.T. Roberts in the College Draft. On March 6, 1997, the Revolution waived Roberts.

New England Revolution – 1997 MLS College Draft
Round	Overall	Name	Position	Previous club
2	12	(United States) Scott Coufal	GK	(United States) Indiana University
3	22	(United States) Steve Klein	M	(United States) Bowling Green State University
3	26	(United States) J.T. Roberts	M	(United States) Northern Kentucky University

==== Supplemental draft ====
On February 2, 1997, the Revolution drafted Bill Harte, Patrick Olalere, and Sam George in the MLS Supplemental Draft.

New England Revolution – 1997 MLS Supplemental Draft
Round	Overall	Name	Position	Previous club
1	3	(United States) Bill Harte	D	(United States) Loyola University, Baltimore Spirit
2	12	(Nigeria) Patrick Olalere	F	(United States) Carson-Newman, California Jaguars
3	22	(United States) Sam George	M	(United States) UCLA, Anaheim Splash

== Club ==
=== Team management ===
Position	Staff
General Manager	(Republic of Ireland) Brian O'Donovan
Head Coach	(Netherlands) Thomas Rongen

=== Roster ===
All listed players made appearances in MLS regular season play.

Note: Flags indicate national team as defined under FIFA eligibility rules; some limited exceptions apply. Players may hold more than one non-FIFA nationality.

No.	Pos.	Nation	Player
4	DF	USA	Mike Burns
5	DF	USA	Ted Chronopoulos
22	DF	USA	Alexi Lalas
20	DF	NGA	Francis Okaroh
10	DF	ARG	Beto Naveda
8	MF	USA	Imad Baba
25	DF	ARG	Alejandro Farías
6	DF	ARG	Leonardo Squadrone
1	GK	ITA	Walter Zenga
11	FW	MOZ	Chiquinho Conde
9	FW	USA	John Kerr Jr.
12	FW	USA	Joe-Max Moore
14	MF	USA	Sam George
3	DF	USA	Erik Imler
11	DF	TRI	Evans Wise
7	DF	RSA	Ivan McKinley

No.	Pos.	Nation	Player
33	FW	ITA	Giuseppe Galderisi
26	GK	USA	Jeff Causey
7	FW	USA	Darren Sawatzky
18	FW	IRL	Paul Keegan
27	GK	USA	Scott Coufal
2	DF	USA	Bill Harte
2	DF	USA	Brian Dunseth
23	FW	USA	Rob Jachym
19	MF	USA	Steve Klein
9	DF	USA	Kevin Wylie
24	FW	NGA	Patrick Olalere
17	DF	USA	Greg Lalas

== Non-competitive ==
=== Preseason ===
The Revolution played six pre-season matches and had a 3-2-1 record.

==== Matches ====
January 11 Friendly	New England Revolution	1–0	Raleigh Flyers
	Darren Sawatzky	Report

February 26 (Note: The friendly match against Dallas was originally scheduled for February 25, but was postponsed.) Friendly	New England Revolution	0–2	Dallas Burn	Pensacola, Florida
		Report		Stadium: Pensacola Sports Complex

February 28 Friendly	New England Revolution	v	Colombus Crew

March 10 Friendly	New England Revolution	3–1	Kansas City Wizards	Bradenton, Florida
	Beto Naveda; Darren Sawatzky	Report	Paul Wright

March 12 Friendly	New England Revolution	5–0	Daytona Beach Sandsharks
	Darren Sawatzky; Patrick Olalere; Steve Klein; John DeBrito	Report

March 14 Friendly	Colorado Rapids	2–0	New England Revolution	Kissimmee, Florida
3pm		Report

=== Mid-season friendlies ===
==== Matches ====
July 23 Friendly	New England Revolution	0–1	Palmeiras	Foxborough, Massachusetts
		Report	Euller 71'	Stadium: Foxboro Stadium; Attendance: 19,623

== Competitive ==
=== Major League Soccer ===
==== Conference standings ====
Pos	Team	Pld	W	SOW	L	GF	GA	GD	Pts	Qualification
1	D.C. United	32	17	4	11	70	53	+17	55	MLS Cup Playoffs
2	Tampa Bay Mutiny	32	14	3	15	55	60	−5	45	MLS Cup Playoffs
3	Columbus Crew	32	12	3	17	42	41	+1	39	MLS Cup Playoffs
4	New England Revolution	32	11	4	17	40	53	−13	37	MLS Cup Playoffs
5	NY/NJ MetroStars	32	11	2	19	43	53	−10	35	

Source: MLS

==== Overall standings ====
Pos	Team	Pld	W	SOW	L	GF	GA	GD	Pts	Qualification
1	D.C. United (C, S)	32	17	4	11	70	53	+17	55	CONCACAF Champions' Cup
2	Kansas City Wizards	32	14	7	11	57	51	+6	49	
3	Tampa Bay Mutiny	32	14	3	15	55	60	−5	45	
4	Los Angeles Galaxy	32	14	2	16	55	44	+11	44	
5	Dallas Burn	32	13	3	16	55	49	+6	42	
6	Columbus Crew	32	12	3	17	42	41	+1	39	
7	Colorado Rapids	32	12	2	18	50	59	−9	38	CONCACAF Champions' Cup
8	New England Revolution	32	11	4	17	40	53	−13	37	
9	NY/NJ MetroStars	32	11	2	19	43	53	−10	35	
10	San Jose Clash	32	9	3	20	55	59	−4	30	

Source: MLS
Rules for classification: 1) points; 2) head-to-head record; 3) goal difference; 4) number of goals scored
(C) Champions; (S) Supporters' Shield

==== Matches ====
March 29 1	Dallas Burn	0–1	New England Revolution	Dallas
		Report	Dade 38' (o.g.)	Stadium: Cotton Bowl; Attendance: 11,063; Referee: Raul Dominguez

April 6 2	Tampa Bay Mutiny	4–0	New England Revolution	Tampa
	Hejduk 26'; Valderrama 44'; Lassiter 62'; Ralston 63'	Report		Stadium: Houlihan's Stadium; Attendance: 10,143; Referee: Rich Grady

April 12 3	NY/NJ MetroStars	3–1	New England Revolution	East Rutherford
	Savarese 17', 55'; Wood 82'	Report	George 16'	Stadium: Giants Stadium; Attendance: 20,328; Referee: Paul Tamberino

April 20 4	New England Revolution	2–1	Tampa Bay Mutiny	Foxborough
	Naveda 27'; Sawatzky 77'	Report	Batista 70'	Stadium: Foxboro Stadium; Attendance: 57,407; Referee: Brian Hall

April 26 5	New England Revolution	1–1 (SO) (2–1 p)	Colorado Rapids	Foxborough
	Moore 14'	Report	Vermes 90'	Stadium: Foxboro Stadium; Attendance: 12,219; Referee: Kevin Terry
	Penalties
	(penalty missed) Okaroh; (penalty scored) Baba; (penalty missed) Sawatzky; (penalty scored) Naveda		(penalty scored) Paz; (penalty missed) Trittschuh; (penalty missed) Balboa; (penalty missed) Vermes; (penalty missed) Bravo

May 3 6	New England Revolution	2–1	Kansas City Wizards	Foxborough
	Baba 1'; Conde 70'	Report	Tinsley (red card) 83'; Preki 85' (pen.)	Stadium: Foxboro Stadium; Attendance: 15,075; Referee: Rich Grady

May 9 7	New England Revolution	0–2	Columbus Crew	Foxborough
		Report	Carrera 6'; Salcedo 68'	Stadium: Foxboro Stadium; Attendance: 13,168; Referee: John Weselak

May 16 8	San Jose Clash	1–1 (0–3 p)	New England Revolution	San Jose
	Dayak 7'	Report	Baba 52'	Stadium: Spartan Stadium; Attendance: 10,532; Referee: Ali Saheli
	Penalties
	(penalty missed) Baicher; (penalty missed) Lozzano; (penalty missed) Urbányi		(penalty scored) Moore; (penalty scored) Baba; (penalty scored) Imler

May 18 9	New England Revolution	0–0 (2–4 p)	D.C. United	Foxborough
		Report		Stadium: Foxboro Stadium; Attendance: 15,109; Referee: Ted Covaciu
	Penalties
	(penalty missed) Moore; (penalty scored) Baba; (penalty scored) Imler; (penalty missed) Burns		(penalty scored) Baicher; (penalty missed) Marsch; (penalty scored) Kelderman; (penalty scored) Etcheverry; (penalty scored) Iroha

May 24 10	Colorado Rapids	1–2	New England Revolution	Denver
	Harris 12'	Report	Dayak 36', 88'	Stadium: Mile High Stadium; Attendance: 9,452; Referee: Tim Weyland

May 30 11	New England Revolution	3–1	NY/NJ MetroStars	Foxborough
	Naveda 57' (pen.), 71', 90'	Report	Savarese 31'	Stadium: Foxboro Stadium; Attendance: 15,849; Referee: Esse Baharmast

June 1 12	New England Revolution	3–1	Dallas Burn	Foxborough
	Conde 63'; Imad Baba 65', 82'	Report	Ted Eck 41'	Stadium: Foxboro Stadium; Attendance: 10,242; Referee: Tim Weyland

June 8 13	New England Revolution	0–0 (2–1 p)	LA Galaxy	Foxborough
		Report		Stadium: Foxboro Stadium; Attendance: 16,218; Referee: Alberto Giordano
	Penalties
	(penalty scored) Baba; (penalty missed) Burns; (penalty missed) Imler; (penalty scored) Naveda		(penalty missed) Jones; (penalty missed) Armas; (penalty missed) Fraser; (penalty scored) Vanney; (penalty missed) Jara

June 14 14	New England Revolution	0–1	D.C. United	Foxborough
		Report	Sanneh 72'	Stadium: Foxboro Stadium; Attendance: 26,313; Referee: Raul Dominguez

June 22 15	New England Revolution	2–2 (2–1 p)	Dallas Burn	Foxborough
	Farías 29'; Lalas 65'	Report	Álvarez 19'; Kreis 27'	Stadium: Foxboro Stadium; Attendance: 15,819; Referee: Noel Kenny
	Penalties
	(penalty scored) Baba; (penalty missed) Imler; (penalty missed) Naveda; (penalty scored) Okaroh		(penalty missed) Santel; (penalty scored) Soehn; (penalty missed) Soñora; (penalty missed) Elliott; (penalty missed) Eck

July 4 16	LA Galaxy	2–0	New England Revolution	Pasadena
	Jones 79'; Wélton 86'	Report		Stadium: Rose Bowl; Attendance: 51,704; Referee: Ali Saheli

July 6 17	San Jose Clash	3–2	New England Revolution	San Jose
	Baicher 37'; Dayak 45'; Cerritos 72'	Report	Naveda 37'; Lalas 59'	Stadium: Spartan Stadium; Attendance: 11,753; Referee: John Weselak

July 12 18	New England Revolution	2–0	Kansas City Wizards	Foxborough
	Kerr Jr. 37'; Wise 58'; Farías (red card) 88'	Report	Johnston (red card) 88'	Stadium: Foxboro Stadium; Attendance: 21,817; Referee: Tim Weyland

July 18 19	New England Revolution	4–2	Tampa Bay Mutiny	Foxborough
	Baba 53'; Chiquinho Conde 54', 57'; Kerr Jr. 71'	Report	Lassiter 31'; Vásquez 42'	Stadium: Foxboro Stadium; Attendance: 19,075; Referee: Paul Tamberino

July 20 20	Columbus Crew	1–0	New England Revolution	Columbus
	Warzycha 55'	Report		Stadium: Ohio Stadium; Attendance: 14,248; Referee: Raul Dominguez

July 26 21	Kansas City Wizards	0–0 (4–3 p)	New England Revolution	Kansas City
		Report		Stadium: Arrowhead Stadium; Attendance: 10,029
	Penalties
	(penalty scored) Chung; (penalty scored) Wright; (penalty scored) Preki; (penalty missed) Klopas; (penalty scored) McKeon		(penalty missed) Moore; (penalty scored) Wise; (penalty missed) Naveda; (penalty scored) Burns; (penalty scored) Okaroh

August 3 22	New England Revolution	1–5	San Jose Clash	Foxborough
	Baba 22'	Report	Lozzano 36', 68'; Baicher 71', 90'; Emenalo 84'	Stadium: Foxboro Stadium; Attendance: 22,673; Referee: Joshua Patlak

August 9 23	Colorado Rapids	3–0	New England Revolution	Denver
	Harris 7', 67'; Patiño 29'	Report		Stadium: Mile High Stadium; Attendance: 8,654

August 14 24	New England Revolution	1–1 (2–3 p)	LA Galaxy	Foxborough
	Chronopoulos (yellow card) 69' (yellow-red card) 82'; McKinley 90'	Report	Wélton 9'	Stadium: Foxboro Stadium; Attendance: 21,886; Referee: Paul Tamberino
	Penalties
	(penalty scored) Baba; (penalty missed) Okaroh; (penalty scored) Burns; (penalty missed) Wise; (penalty missed) Galderisi		(penalty missed) Karapetyan; (penalty scored) Jones; (penalty scored) Machón; (penalty scored) Armas; (penalty missed) Vanney

August 14 25	Columbus Crew	2–1	New England Revolution	Columbus
	Wood 43'; Elcock 87'	Report	McKinley 75'	Stadium: Ohio Stadium; Attendance: 15,718; Referee: Marcel Yonan

August 27 26	D.C. United	3–2	New England Revolution	Washington, D.C.
	Etcheverry 39'; Moreno 59'; Díaz Arce 88'	Report	Baba 43'; McKinley 51'	Stadium: Robert F. Kennedy Memorial Stadium; Attendance: 9,675; Referee: Noel Kenny

August 30 27	Tampa Bay Mutiny	4–0	New England Revolution	Tampa
	Vásquez 39'; Lassiter 64'; Prampin 82'; Vargas 87'	Report		Stadium: Houlihan's Stadium; Attendance: 9,253; Referee: Esse Baharmast

September 9 28	NY/NJ MetroStars	3–1	New England Revolution	East Rutherford
	Semioli 40'; Bartlett 45'; Savarese 74'	Report	Naveda 29'	Stadium: Giants Stadium; Attendance: 10,510; Referee: Noel Kenny

September 12 29	New England Revolution	1–0	Columbus Crew	Foxborough
	Naveda 3'	Report		Stadium: Foxboro Stadium; Attendance: 21,619; Referee: Ted Covaciu

September 16 30	D.C. United	2–2 (5–4 p)	New England Revolution	Washington, D.C.
	Keegan 32' (o.g.) Harkes 87'	Report	Moore 12', 53'	Stadium: Robert F. Kennedy Memorial Stadium; Attendance: 11,607; Referee: Toru Kamikawa
	Penalties
	(penalty missed) Etcheverry; (penalty scored) Kelderman; (penalty missed) Moreno; (penalty scored) Maessner; (penalty missed) Díaz Arce; (penalty missed) Sanneh; (penalty scored) Harkes; (penalty missed) Mario Gori; (penalty scored) Llamosa; (penalty scored) Pope		(penalty missed) Baba; (penalty scored) Imler; (penalty missed) Burns; (penalty missed) Wise; (penalty scored) Moore; (penalty missed) Klein; (penalty scored) Chronopoulos; (penalty missed) Farías; (penalty scored) Lalas; (penalty missed) Dunseth

September 20 31	New England Revolution	3–2	NY/NJ MetroStars	Foxborough
	Chronopoulos 22', 69' (yellow card) 67' (yellow-red card) 88'; McKinley 49'	Report	de Ávila 21'; Semioli 37'	Stadium: Foxboro Stadium; Attendance: 36,273; Referee: Arturo Angeles

September 25 31	Dallas Burn	1–2	New England Revolution	Dallas
	Elliott 31'	Report	Moore 58' (pen.); Keegan 88'	Stadium: Cotton Bowl; Attendance: 6,897; Referee: Brian Hall

=== MLS Cup Playoffs ===
The Revolution qualified for their first ever MLS Cup Playoffs and faced off against reigning champions D.C. United in a best-of-three matches. The team failed to secure a win in either match. It would take until the MLS Cup Playoffs in 2000 before the Revolution would appear in a playoff match again, and until the MLS Cup Playoffs in 2002 before they would advance in a playoff match-up.

==== Matches ====
October 5 Game 1	D.C. United	4–1	New England Revolution	Washington, D.C.
	Wegerle 13', 56'; Moreno 65', 76'		Burns 89'	Stadium: RFK Stadium; Attendance: 12,540; Referee: Tim Weyland

October 8 Game 2	New England Revolution	1–1 (a.e.t.) (3–4 p)	D.C. United	Foxborough, Massachusetts
	Okaroh (red card) 70'; Moore 72'	Report	Williams 53'	Stadium: Foxboro Stadium; Attendance: 16,233; Referee: Rich Grady
	Penalties
	Moore (penalty scored); Burns (penalty scored); Chronopoulos (penalty scored); Galderisi (penalty missed); Naveda (penalty missed); Keegan (penalty missed); McKinley (penalty missed)		(penalty scored) Etcheverry; (penalty scored) Moreno; (penalty scored) Kelderman; (penalty missed) Agoos; (penalty missed) Iroha; (penalty missed) Harkes; (penalty scored) Llamosa

D.C. United win the series 2–0.

=== U.S. Open Cup ===
The Revolution made their U.S. Open Cup debut after declining to participate in the 1996 edition. They exited in the Third Round after a 4-3 loss in sudden death extra time, to the Long Island Rough Riders.

==== Matches ====
July 31 Third Round	New England Revolution (Massachusetts)	3–4 (asdet)	Long Island Rough Riders (A-League) (New York (state))	Foxborough, Massachusetts
6:00 PM	Kerr 9'; Moore 59'; Sawatzky 19'		Rinker 43'; Rooney 74', 79'; Mohammed 108'	Attendance: 2,031; Referee: Ruben Rodhas

== Honors ==
New England Revolution – 1997 League and Team Awards
Honor	Name
Revolution Team Most Valuable Player	Walter Zenga
Revolution Team Scoring Champion	Alberto Naveda (20pts; 7g, 6a)
Revolution Team Defender of the Year	Francis Okaroh
MLS All-Stars	Alexi Lalas, Ted Chronopoulos, Walter Zenga
MLS Goalkeeper of the Year	Walter Zenga (finalist)
MLS Player of the Month	Walter Zenga (September)
MLS Player of the Month	Chiquinho Conde (Week 10), Alberto Naveda (Week 11)
