= All-time Tampa Bay Mutiny roster =

This list comprises all players who have participated in at least one league match for Tampa Bay Mutiny from the team's first Major League Soccer season in 1996 until its last season, in 2001. Players who were on the roster but never played a first team game are not listed; players who appeared for the team in other competitions (US Open Cup, CONCACAF Champions League, etc.) but never actually made an MLS appearance are noted at the bottom of the page.

A "†" denotes players who only appeared in a single match.

== A ==
- (Ghana) Joseph Addo
- (United States) Cesar Alvarado †
- (United States) Kevin Anderson

== B ==
- (United States) Derek Backman
- (England) Kyle Baker
- (Bulgaria) Kalin Bankov
- (United States) Devin Barclay
- (Brazil) João Batista
- (United States) Adin Brown
- (Mozambique) Manuel Bucuane
- (United States) Scott Budnick
- (Nigeria) Boniface Okafor

== C ==
- (United States) Scott Cannon
- (Mozambique) Chiquinho Conde
- (United States) Ali Curtis

== D ==
- (Trinidad and Tobago) Craig Demmin
- (United States) Eric Denton
- (Senegal) Mamadou Diallo
- (El Salvador) Raúl Díaz Arce
- (United States) John Diffley
- (United States) Mark Dougherty
- (England) Paul Dougherty
- (United States) Mike Duhaney

== E ==
- (Sweden) Jan Eriksson

== F ==
- (United States) Marco Ferruzzi
- (United States) Adam Frye

== G ==
- (Italy) Giuseppe Galderisi
- (United States) Scott Garlick
- (United States) Sam George
- (Brazil) Gilmar
- (Bolivia) Jefferson Gottardi
- (United States) Don Gramenz

== H ==
- (United States) Bill Harte
- (United States) Frankie Hejduk
- (United States) Daniel Hernandez
- (United States) Chris Houser
- (Socialist Federal Republic of Yugoslavia) Goran Hunjak

== J ==
- (Cape Verde) Jair
- (United States) Guillermo Jara

== K ==
- (Armenia) Harut Karapetyan
- (United States) Gus Kartes†
- (United States) Josh Keller
- (United States) Brian Kelly
- (United States) Dominic Kinnear
- (United States) Cle Kooiman
- (United States) Ritchie Kotschau
- (United States) Wojtek Krakowiak

== L ==
- (United States) Manny Lagos
- (United States) Greg Lalas
- (United States) Roy Lassiter
- (United States) Brian Loftin
- (United States) Alex Luna

== M ==
- (United States) John Maessner
- (United States) Amos Magee
- (United States) Pete Marino
- (United States) Chad McCarty
- (South Africa) Ivan McKinley
- (United States) R.T. Moore
- (Venezuela) Alberto Munoz

== P ==
- (United States) Danny Pena
- (United States) Doug Petras
- (United States) Steve Pittman
- (United States) Kevin Peterson
- (United States) Alan Prampin

== Q ==
- (United States) Eric Quill

== R ==
- (United States) Steve Ralston
- (Bolivia) Mauricio Ramos
- (Sweden) Thomas Ravelli

== S ==
- (United States) Jorge Salcedo
- (United States) Paul Schneider
- (Liberia) Musa Shannon
- (Argentina) Diego Soñora

== T ==
- (United States) Steve Trittschuh
- (Argentina) Maximiliano Torrillas

== V ==
- (Colombia) Carlos Valderrama
- (United States) Nelson Vargas
- (United States) Martin Vasquez
- (Uruguay) Diego Viera

== W ==
- (United States) Roy Wegerle
- (Trinidad and Tobago) Evans Wise

== Y ==
- (Canada) Frank Yallop
- (Jamaica) Paul Young

== Z ==
- (Poland) Jacek Ziober

== Sources ==
- "MLS All-Time MLS Player Register". Mlsnet.com. Major League Soccer. Archived from the original on 14 February 2009.
- "MLS Number Assignments Archive".
