= Chiquinho Conde =

Mozambican footballer (born 1965)

Personal information
- Full name: Francisco Queriol Conde Júnior
- Date of birth: 22 November 1965 (age 60)
- Place of birth: Beira, Mozambique
- Height: 1.70 m (5 ft 7 in)
- Position: Striker

Team information
- Current team: Mozambique (manager)

Senior career*
Years	Team	Apps	(Gls)
1986–1987	Maxaquene		
1987–1991	Belenenses	115	(29)
1991–1992	Braga	22	(3)
1992–1994	Vitória Setúbal	58	(27)
1994–1995	Sporting CP	27	(3)
1996	Belenenses	4	(0)
1996–1997	Vitória Setúbal	20	(7)
1997	New England Revolution	17	(6)
1997	Tampa Bay Mutiny	8	(0)
1998–2000	Vitória Setúbal	75	(27)
2000–2001	Alverca	16	(1)
2001–2002	Portimonense	33	(3)
2002–2003	Imortal	35	(5)
2004–2005	Montijo		
Total		430	(111)

International career
1986–2001	Mozambique	43	(12)

Managerial career
- 2005–2006: Maxaquene
- 2008: Liga Desportiva
- 2009–2010: Ferroviário Maputo
- 2011–2013: Vilankulo
- 2014–2016: Maxaquene
- 2017–2018: Songo
- 2018–2020: Vitória Setúbal (under-23)
- 2021–: Mozambique
- * Club domestic league appearances and goals

Francisco Queriol Conde Júnior (born 22 November 1965), known as Chiquinho Conde, is a Mozambican former footballer who played as a striker, currently manager of Mozambique.

Most of his extensive professional career was spent in Portugal, mainly with Vitória de Setúbal, also having a spell in the United States in 1997. Over the course of 13 seasons, he amassed Primeira Liga totals of 309 games and 85 goals.

Conde represented Mozambique in three Africa Cup of Nations. In 2005, he started working as a coach.

== Playing career ==
=== Early career ===
Born in Beira, Conde arrived in Portugal in the summer of 1987 from CD Maxaquene, and would remain in the country for the following decade, starting with C.F. Os Belenenses. After good spells at S.C. Braga and Vitória F.C. he signed with Sporting CP, but failed to reproduce his previous form, returning to Belenenses in January 1996.

=== Major League Soccer ===
Recommended to the Major League Soccer by former New York/New Jersey MetroStars coach Carlos Queiroz, Conde moved to the league aged 31, where he represented the New England Revolution and the Tampa Bay Mutiny. He joined the former on 20 February 1997, with newly appointed manager Thomas Rongen speaking highly of his acquisition, calling him "a proven goal scorer in an extremely competitive league", adding that he "has the versatility to play up top or out wide and will give us a leadership presence on and off the field."

Conde made his debut for the Revolution in the season opener, a 1–0 win against Dallas Burn on 29 March 1997. He scored his first goal for the club on 3 May, in the 2–1 victory over the Kansas City Wizards. He was named Player of the Week for the tenth round following his brace in a 2–1 defeat of Colorado Rapids, and represented the Eastern Conference in the MLS All-Star Game alongside teammates Ted Chronopoulos, Alexi Lalas and Walter Zenga.

On 13 August 1997, Conde was traded with Sam George to the Mutiny for Giuseppe Galderisi and Ivan McKinley. In 17 total starts for the Revolution, he scored six times and recorded four assists; at that time, he was leading the team in scoring, but Rongen was eager to reunite with Galderisi and McKinley.

=== Later years ===
In January 1998, Conde returned to Portugal and a former side, Vitória Setúbal (his third stint); in the first full season upon his return, he scored 14 goals as they qualified for the UEFA Cup as fifth.

Following stints at F.C. Alverca and Portimonense SC, Conde retired in 2005 after playing amateur football in the country. He represented Mozambique for 15 years, appearing at the 1986, 1996 and 1998 Africa Cup of Nations tournaments, with the national side finishing bottom of the group on all three occasions; he was regarded as one of the best players the country ever produced, alongside Dário and Tico-Tico.

== Coaching career ==
Conde worked as a manager after retiring, being in charge of several teams in the Moçambola and also coaching Vitória Setúbal's under-23s. In October 2021, the 55-year-old replaced the dismissed Horácio Gonçalves at the helm of the Mozambique national side.

Conde led the country at the 2023 Africa Cup of Nations, in a group-stage exit following two draws and a loss.

== Honours ==
Belenenses

- Taça de Portugal: 1988–89

Sporting CP

- Taça de Portugal: 1994–95

Individual

- MLS All-Star Game: 1997

== Managerial statistics ==
As of match played 17 November 2026

Managerial record by team and tenure
Team	Nat	From	To	Record					Ref.
Team	Nat	From	To	G	W	D	L	Win %	Ref.
Mozambique	(Mozambique)	October 2021	present	81	22	29	30	27.16	
Career Total				81	22	29	30	27.16	—
