= Coufal =

Coufal (feminine: Coufalová) is a Czech surname. Notable people with the surname include:

- Birgit Coufal (born 1985), Austrian squash player
- Kateřina Coufalová (born 1983), Czech Paralympic swimmer
- Petr Coufal (born 1995), Czech figure skater
- Scott Coufal (born 1974), American soccer player
- Vladimír Coufal (born 1992), Czech footballer
