= Giuseppe Galderisi =

Italian football manager (born 1963)

Personal information
- Date of birth: 22 March 1963 (age 63)
- Place of birth: Salerno, Italy
- Height: 1.70 m (5 ft 7 in)
- Position: Striker

Youth career
- Salernitana
- Juventus

Senior career*
Years	Team	Apps	(Gls)
1980–1983	Juventus	24	(6)
1983–1986	Verona	82	(24)
1986–1987	Milan	21	(3)
1987–1988	→ Lazio (loan)	33	(1)
1988–1989	→ Verona (loan)	28	(4)
1989–1995	Padova	180	(50)
1996	New England Revolution	4	(0)
1996–1997	Tampa Bay Mutiny	37	(12)
1997	New England Revolution	7	(0)
Total		416	(100)

International career
1982–1987	Italy U-21	16	(2)
1985–1987	Italy	10	(0)

Managerial career
- 2000–2001: Gubbio
- 2001–2002: Cremonese
- 2002–2003: Giulianova
- 2005: Viterbese
- 2005–2006: Sambenedettese
- 2006–2007: Avellino
- 2008–2009: Pescara
- 2009–2010: Arezzo
- 2010–2011: Benevento
- 2011–2012: Triestina
- 2012: Salernitana
- 2014: Olhanense
- 2014–2015: Lucchese
- 2016–2017: Lucchese
- 2018–2019: Gubbio
- 2020: Vis Pesaro
- 2021–2022: Mantova
- 2023: Gelbison
- * Club domestic league appearances and goals

Giuseppe Galderisi (Italian pronunciation: [dʒuˈzɛppe ɡaldeˈriːzi]; born 22 March 1963) is an Italian football manager and a former footballer who played as a forward.

== Club career ==
At club level, Galderisi played for several Italian teams throughout his career, scoring almost 200 goals across the various divisions of Italian football. A Juventus youth product, he began his professional career with the Juventus senior side, making his club debut on 20 August 1980, in a 2–2 draw against Udinese in the Coppa Italia; he made his Serie A debut with the club in a 0–0 away draw against Perugia, on 9 November 1980, his only league appearance of the 1980–81 season. Although he struggled to find the back of the net consistently with Juventus, he scored decisive goals during the 1981–82 season, including a hat-trick in Juventus's 3–2 home victory over Milan on 14 February 1982. During the 1982–83 season, he also won the Coppa Italia with Juventus and reached the 1983 European Cup final. In total he scored 6 goals in 16 appearances for Juventus.

After a spell of mixed success with Juventus, he joined provincial side Hellas Verona in 1983, where his goalscoring form improved; during the 1984–85 season, he established himself as one of the top strikers in the league, and was the Verona's top scorer with 11 goals as he helped the club win their historic first ever Serie A title. In 1986, he joined Milan (1986–87), and later played for Lazio (1987–88), and also had a second spell with Verona (1988–89), although he failed to replicate his form from previous seasons due to several injuries. After moving around between several different clubs, he joined Padova in 1989, where he remained until 1995, and had several positive seasons with the club in Serie B.

=== Major League Soccer ===
Major League Soccer was beginning its first season in 1996, and assigned "marquee players" to each of its ten teams. The Major League Soccer 1996 MLS Inaugural Allocations were signed by the league and then distributed to the ten clubs by February 1996. Each club was allocated four marquee players.

==== New England Revolution ====
As part of this process, on 5 February 1996, Galderisi, along with Jim St. Andre, were allocated by Major League Soccer to the New England Revolution for the team's inaugural season. Galderisi had been recommended to New England manager Frank Stapleton by his former Milan teammate Ray Wilkins. With the Revolution, Galderisi would be joining his former Padova teammate Alexi Lalas, who had also been allocated to the club.

Galderisi became the Revolution's second-highest paid player upon signing, making a reported $325,000, including bonuses that were guaranteed, and taking up one of the league's maximum $175,000 salary cap slots. Stapleton described Galderisi as a "proven goal-scorer who is a championship veteran of the Italian League. This aggressive and internationally experienced forward will be a vital piece in constructing a complete football team in New England."

Despite high-praise and early hopes, Galderisi struggled to make an impact, ultimately becoming the focal point of the Revolution's first-ever star player controversy and being labeled a "flop." He made his Revolution debut as an 89th-minute substitute for Beto Naveda in the club's first-ever match, a 3–2 loss to the Tampa Bay Mutiny on 13 April. He made his first start the following week, in the club's first-ever win, on 20 April against the MetroStars, and his home debut on 27 April against D.C. United in the club's first-ever home match. The following week, Galderisi was substituted in the 65th minute of the Revolution's 2–1 loss to the San Jose Clash, and made his frustrations regarding the decision known on the sideline, throwing a "temper tantrum" and stating post-match that management had no faith in him.

Galderisi clashed with Stapleton during the season, who admitted Galderisi was "not at the level we'd expect" and "wasn't making any impact." On 10 May the Revolution placed Galderisi on waivers.

==== Tampa Bay Mutiny ====
Galderisi signed with the Tampa Bay Mutiny mid-way through the 1996 Major League Soccer season and had substantially more success than he had in New England, making 19 starts for his new club, scoring seven goals and tallying eight assists in the 1996 Tampa Bay Mutiny season, ultimately helping the club to the first-ever MLS Supporters' Shield, a trophy given to the team with the best regular season record.

Galderisi made 15 starts for Tampa Bay in the 1997 season, recording five goals six assists, and earning a spot in the 1997 MLS All-Star Game, in which he scored a 63rd-minute goal in the MLS East's 5–4 win.

==== Return to New England ====
Following Stapleton's resignation at the end of the 1996 New England Revolution season, the Revolution hired Thomas Rongen as their new manager. Rongen, who had coached Galderisi in Tampa, pushed for a trade that would reunite Galderisi with his Tampa teammate Ivan McKinley, and on 13 August 1997 Galderisi was traded back to the Revolution (along with McKinley), in exchange for Chiquinho Conde and Sam George. Galderisi made seven regular season appearances for the Revolution upon his return (recording two assists), and additionally appeared in both of the club's playoff matches against D.C. United. He was again placed on waivers by New England on 11 November.

== International career ==
Galderisi, nicknamed Nanu (short) during his playing career, a nickname he earned during his time with Juventus, was capped ten times for Italy between 1985 and 1987, although he failed to score a goal. He made his international debut on 2 June 1985, in a 1–1 draw against Mexico, and was later part of his nation's 1986 FIFA World Cup squad under manager Enzo Bearzot.

== Style of play ==
A quick, agile and diminutive striker, Galderisi was a prolific goalscorer, with excellent reactions who was also known for his work-rate, generosity, tenacity, and his powerful and accurate striking ability with either foot. He was also known for his accuracy from distance, and was also effective in the air, despite his small stature, due to his timing and elevation. Although he began his career as a second striker, he came into his own as an out-and-out centre-forward, due to his pace, eye for goal, and his determined and opportunistic style of play. Despite his ability he was often prone to injuries throughout his career, and also struggled to maintain his best form in bigger teams, while he performed better at smaller clubs.

== Managerial career ==
On 21 April 1999 Galderisi accepted an assistant coaching role with Walter Zenga's New England Revolution. Galderisi was offered the managerial position upon Zenga's dismissal, but turned down the opportunity. He started his coaching career in 2000 as Serie C2 club Gubbio's boss. He then served as coach in years later for other Serie C clubs, such as Cremonese and Giulianova. His coaching career experienced a sudden break in January 2004, when Galderisi suffered a heart attack. He fully recovered since then, and in 2005 he accepted an offer from Viterbese of Serie C2. In 2006–2007, he coached Avellino of Serie C1; after a very impressive first half of season ended in first place, he was fired on 18 April 2007 despite his team, then in second place, was still involved in the promotion run.

In January 2008, Galderisi was appointed at the helm of Serie C1 side Foggia, replacing Salvatore Campilongo. During his tenure, the satanelli's performances dramatically improved as they managed to make a comeback to the promotion playoff spots.

In July 2008 he was appointed as new manager of Lega Pro Prima Divisione side Pescara, replacing Franco Lerda, with the aim to win promotion to Serie B for the biancazzurri. However, during his tenure as head coach, Galderisi had to face with serious economic issues within the club; Pescara was ultimately declared out of business in December 2008 and the club control passed legally to a bankruptcy trustee appointed by the Court of Pescara. In February 2009 a new property emerged, with Delfino Pescara 1936 being constituted and taking over the club from the Court of Pescara. Results did not improve anyway, with Pescara struggling in the bottom part of the table, and Galderisi was dismissed from his coaching post on 23 March 2009, being replaced by another former Juventus and Italy international footballer, Antonello Cuccureddu.

In the season 2009–10 he coached Arezzo and in the following season he coached Benevento.

On 25 October 2011 he signed a one-year deal with sleeping giants U.S. Triestina Calcio until the end of the season. The season turned out to be a particularly troubled one due to massive financial issues that ultimately led to many players' departures during the winter transfer market, no salaries being paid for most of the season, relegation and even the cancellation of the club from Italian football.

In July 2012 he was announced as new head coach of hometown club Salernitana, who were just promoted back into professionalism, but he left after getting only one point in three games.

Later in January 2014, he was named the new head coach of Portuguese top-flight strugglers S.C. Olhanense, a club owned by an Italian consortium and with a squad featuring several players formerly of Serie A. He left the club by the end of the season after failing to save it from relegation.

He returned to management in November 2014 to take over at struggling Lega Pro team Lucchese, not being confirmed for the following season despite succeeding in saving them from relegation. He returned at Lucchese in March 2016, signing a contract until June 2017. Galderisi's contract got terminated on 27 March 2017.

On 26 November 2018, he returned to the first club he managed, Gubbio, at the time in the 15th place in Serie C. Galderisi left the club on 23 May 2019.

On 18 February 2020, he was hired by Serie C club Vis Pesaro. He was fired by Vis Pesaro on 3 November 2020 following a poor start to the 2020–21 season.

On 14 December 2021, Galderisi returned into management as the new head coach of Serie C club Mantova, replacing Maurizio Lauro. He was dismissed on 12 April 2022 following a negative string of results, with Lauro being reinstated as head coach.

On 3 April 2023, Galderisi was hired by relegation-battling Serie C club Gelbison, agreeing on a contract until 30 June 2024. During his stint at the club, he failed to keep Gelbison into professionalism as they lost to Messina in the relegation playoffs, and consequently left the club.

== Honours ==
=== Player ===
Juventus

- Serie A: 1980–81, 1981–82
- Coppa Italia: 1982–83

Verona

- Serie A: 1984–85

Individual

- MLS All-Star: 1997
