= Imad Baba =

American soccer player

Personal information
- Full name: Imad Fuad Baba
- Date of birth: March 15, 1974 (age 52)
- Place of birth: Humble, Texas, US
- Height: 5 ft 10 in (1.78 m)
- Position: Midfielder

College career
| Years | Team | Apps | (Gls) |
| 1993–1995 | Clemson Tigers | | |

Senior career*
| Years | Team | Apps | (Gls) |
| 1996–2000 | New England Revolution | 102 | (23) |
| 2001–2002 | Colorado Rapids | 32 | (1) |
| Total | | 136 | (25) |

International career
| 1999 | United States | 1 | (0) |
- * Club domestic league appearances and goals

Imad Baba (born March 15, 1974) is an American former professional soccer player who played as a midfielder. He spent seven years in Major League Soccer (MLS) with the New England Revolution and Colorado Rapids. He was also a member of the American squads at the 1989 U-16 World Championships, 1993 U-20 World Cup and the 1996 Summer Olympics. Baba earned one cap with the senior United States national team.

== Club career ==
=== Early career ===
Baba's father moved to Texas from Palestine. Baba was born and raised in Texas. In 1990, he was given a trial at Manchester United, but failed to impress. He was the 1992 Texas High School Player of the Year and a four-time Parade Magazine high school All-American, the only player to earn that honor four times. After high school, he attended the Clemson University where he played on the men's soccer team for three seasons from 1993 to 1995. A varsity starter as a freshman, Baba elected to skip his last season in order to turn professional.

=== Professional career ===
On March 4, 1996, the New England Revolution selected Baba in the second round (16th overall) of the 1996 MLS College Draft. Baba spent five seasons in total with the Revs. He made his first appearance for the club on July 31 in a home win against the San Jose Clash, coming on as a 68th-minute substitute for Peter Woodring. His first start came on August 16 in a home win against the Colorado Rapids. He scored his first goal for the Revolution on August 31 against the Tampa Bay Mutiny. He finished the 1997 New England Revolution season as the team's joint-top scorer (alongside Alberto Naveda). Baba was named MLS Player of the Week in week 5 of the 2000 New England Revolution season after recording a brace against DC United on April 15. He finished the 2000 campaign with 9 goals and 8 assists, second only to Wolde Harris in scoring.

He became a free agent on December 21, 2000. On March 19, 2001, Baba and Carlos Parra were traded to the Colorado Rapids for Matthew Okoh, Alan Woods, and a natural second-round pick in the 2002 MLS SuperDraft. Baba spent the next two seasons with the Rapids before announcing his retirement on June 13, 2002.

== Personal life ==
Baba's brother, Nidal, also became a professional soccer player with the New York/New Jersey MetroStars. The two brothers also played together on the United States U16 national team.

== International ==
Baba entered the national team program with the U-16 team as it went through qualifications for the 1989 U-16 World Championship. The U.S. easily qualified only to go 1-1-1 in group play and fail to make the second round. However, Baba scored the lone U.S. goal in its victory over Brazil, the first U.S. goal of the tournament.

Baba went on to play for the U.S. at the 1993 U-20 World Cup in Australia. Baba scored a goal in the 6–0 victory over Turkey in the first U.S. game of the tournament. Once again this was the first U.S. goal of the tournament. The U.S. again went 1-1-1 in group play, but this time it advanced to the second round where the team met Brazil. This time the results were not so favorable to the U.S. as it fell 3–0 to Brazil.

In 1995, Baba again played with the U.S., this time as part of the U-23 national team at the Pan American Games. In this tournament, he started two of the three U.S. games as the U.S. crashed out with an 0–3 record.

He was a member of the Olympic soccer team at the 1996 Summer Olympics. The U.S. went 1-1-1 yet again, but this was not good enough to qualify for the second round.

Baba earned his only cap with the senior United States national team on January 24, 1999, in a scoreless tie with Bolivia when he came on for Eddie Lewis in the 75th minute.
