= Ivan McKinley =

South African soccer player

Personal information
- Date of birth: 15 June 1969 (age 57)
- Place of birth: Johannesburg, South Africa
- Height: 6 ft 1 in (1.85 m)
- Position: Defender

Youth career
- 1987–1991: College of Boca Raton

Senior career*
Years	Team	Apps	(Gls)
1991–1994	Fort Lauderdale Strikers		
1995	Neuchâtel Xamax		
1995	Wits University FC		
1996–1997	Tampa Bay Mutiny	35	(4)
1997–2000	New England Revolution	77	(13)
2000–2001	Miami Fusion	29	(2)
2002	D.C. United	23	(1)
2004	Charleston Battery	5	(0)

International career
1999–2000	South Africa	3	(0)
- * Club domestic league appearances and goals

Ivan McKinley (born 15 June 1969) is a South African retired soccer player who played in Major League Soccer from 1996 to 2002 with the Tampa Bay Mutiny, the New England Revolution, the Miami Fusion and DC United.

After graduating from Hillview High School, Pretoria in 1986, McKinley attended the College of Boca Raton from 1987 to 1991. He was a two-time NAIA All American soccer player at Boca Raton. In 1991, he signed with the Fort Lauderdale Strikers in the American Professional Soccer League. He played with the Strikers through the 1994 season. In 1995, he played for Neuchâtel Xamax in the Swiss First Division. He finished the year with Wits University FC in South African Premier Soccer League.

On 13 August 1997, McKinley, along with Giuseppe Galderisi, were acquired by the New England Revolution from the Tampa Bay Mutiny in exchange for Chiquinho Conde and Sam George. McKinely made his Revolution debut the next day against the LA Galaxy, and scored a late equalizer to force a shoot-out. In the 1999 New England Revolution season, McKinely was named to the MLS Team of the Week for match week 6, following his brace on 24 April against DC United. On 7 July 2000, McKinley was traded to the Miami Fusion for Eric Wynalda and "future draft considerations." In total for the Revolution McKinley made 77 appearances (76 starts) recording 13 goals and seven assists.

In 2004, he played five games for the Charleston Battery in the USL First Division.
