= Marina Perzy =

Italian television personality and actress

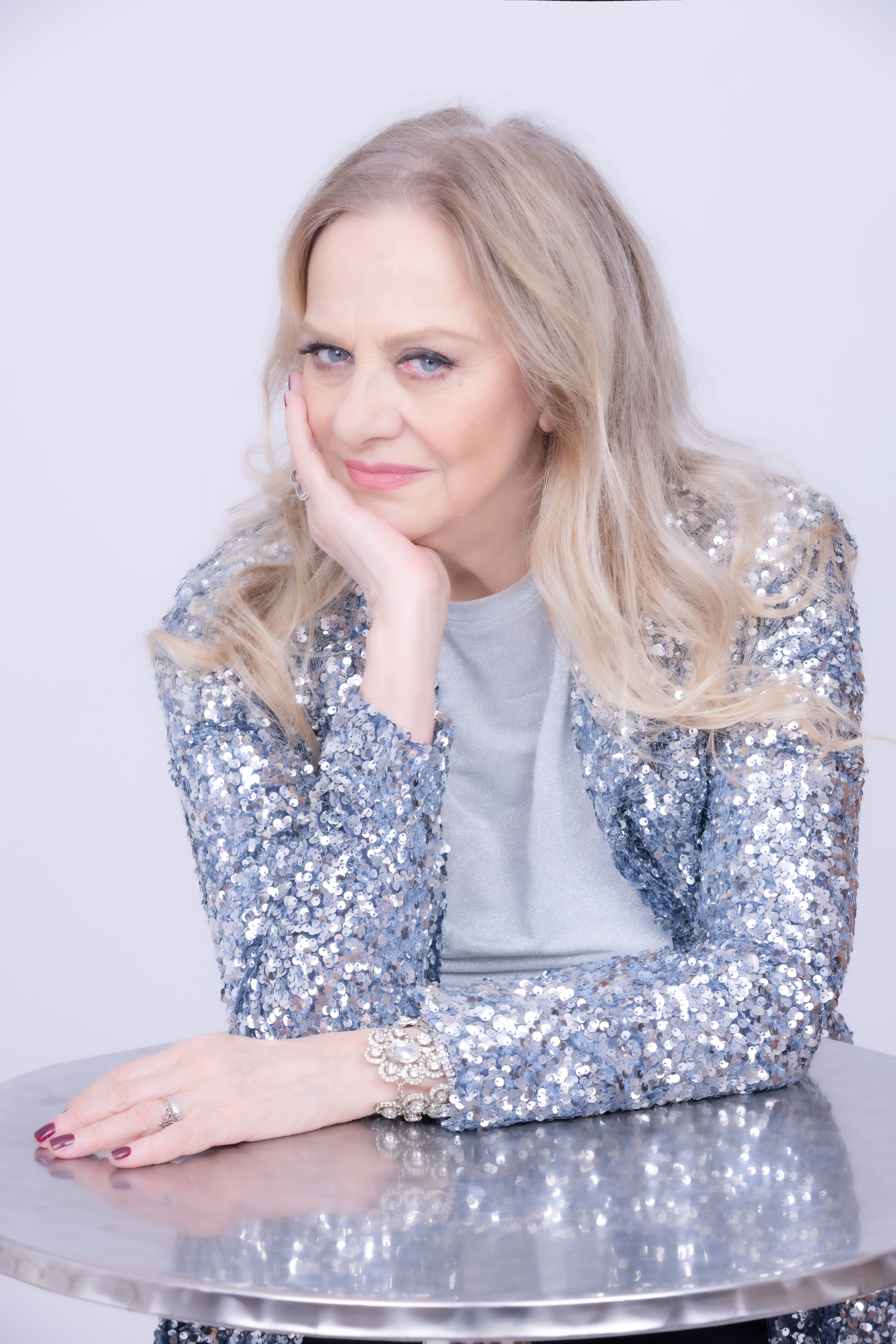
- Marina Perzy in 2024
- Born: 30 August 1955 (age 70); Milan, Italy
- Occupations: Television personality; actress

Marina Perzy (born 30 August 1955) is an Italian television personality, and actress.

== Life and career ==
Born in Milan, Perzy made her debut in 1978, as an assistant of Corrado Mantoni in the RAI television show Domenica in. She hosted a large number of radio and television programs, notably the long-running sport talk-show La Domenica Sportiva. She also starred in several comedy plays, and appeared in a number of films and TV series. In the mid-1980s she was a protagonist of gossip columns for a sentimental relationship with Italian footballer Walter Zenga.
