= Bill Harte =

American soccer player

Personal information
- Date of birth: December 20, 1971 (age 54)
- Place of birth: Baltimore, Maryland, U.S.
- Height: 5 ft 8 in (1.73 m)
- Position: Defender

College career
Years	Team	Apps	(Gls)
1991–1993	Loyola Greyhounds		

Senior career*
Years	Team	Apps	(Gls)
1994	Washington Warthogs (indoor)	27	(8)
1994–1995	Baltimore Bays		
1996	Baltimore Spirit (indoor)	9	(1)
1997	New England Revolution	5	(0)
1997	→ Worcester Wildfire	2	(0)
1997	Tampa Bay Mutiny	4	(0)
- * Club domestic league appearances and goals

Bill Harte is an American retired soccer defender who played one season in Major League Soccer.

Harte attended Loyola University Maryland where he played on the men's soccer team from 1991 to 1993. In the summer of 1994, Harte played for the Washington Warthogs in the Continental Indoor Soccer League. In October 1994, Harte signed with the Baltimore Bays of the USISL. In the fall of 1996, he signed with the Baltimore Spirit of the National Professional Soccer League. He played nine games for the Spirit before being waived on December 26, 1996. On February 1, 1997, the New England Revolution selected Harte in the first round (third pick overall) of the Supplemental Draft. On July 10, 1997, the Revolution sent Harte to the Tampa Bay Mutiny in exchange for Evans Wise. The Mutiny waived Harte in November 1997.

Harte later worked for Adidas America.
