= João Batista (footballer, born 1966) =

Brazilian footballer

Personal information
- Full name: João Batista da Silva
- Date of birth: December 28, 1966 (age 59)
- Place of birth: Brazil
- Position: Midfielder

Senior career*
Years	Team	Apps	(Gls)
- União Esporte Clube
- América Futebol Clube
- Independente Futebol Clube
- Associação Ferroviária de Esportes
- Associação Portuguesa de Desportos
1995	Red Bull Bragantino		
1996	Grêmio Novorizontino		
1997	Tampa Bay Mutiny	17	(1)
1999	São José Esporte Clube		
- Esporte Clube Noroeste
- Rio Preto Esporte Clube
2002–2003	Clube Atlético Sorocaba		
2003	Associação Atlética Anapolina		
- * Club domestic league appearances and goals

João Batista da Silva (born 18 December 1966 in Brazil) is a Brazilian retired footballer.

== Career ==
For the 1997 season, despite being hesitant at first, Batista signed for American top flight side Tampa Bay Mutiny after the brother of another Brazilian player who knew his friends thought he would be an ideal fit for the league. After that, Batista took the 1998 season off due to injury before playing in the Brazilian lower leagues with São José Esporte Clube, Esporte Clube Noroeste, Rio Preto Esporte Clube, Clube Atlético Sorocaba], and Associação Atlética Anapolina.
