= Jefferson Gottardi =

Bolivian footballer (1976–2003)

Personal information
- Full name: Jefferson Gottardi
- Date of birth: January 13, 1976
- Place of birth: Santa Cruz de la Sierra, Bolivia
- Date of death: September 4, 2003 (aged 27)
- Place of death: La Paz, Bolivia
- Height: 1.88 m (6 ft 2 in)
- Position: Striker

Youth career
- 1991–1994: Tahuichi Academy

Senior career*
Years	Team	Apps	(Gls)
1995–1997	Oriente Petrolero		
1998–2000	Bolívar		
1999	→ Tampa Bay Mutiny (loan)	11	(4)
1999	→ Deportivo Táchira (loan)		
2001	Goiás		

International career^{‡}
1995	Bolivia U-20		
1999	Bolivia	1	(0)
- * Club domestic league appearances and goals as of 5 April 2009 ‡ National team caps and goals as of 5 April 2009

Jefferson Gottardi (13 January 1976 — 4 September 2003) was a Bolivian footballer.

== Career ==
=== Club ===
Born in Santa Cruz de la Sierra, Gottardi began his career in his native Bolivia, attending the prestigious Tahuichi Academy (which also produced Marco Etcheverry and Jaime Moreno), and playing for Oriente Petrolero and Bolívar in the Liga de Fútbol Profesional Boliviano.

He secured a loan move to the United States in 1999 to play for Tampa Bay Mutiny, and scored two goals on his MLS debut in a 5–2 loss to D.C. United, but never truly settled in Major League Soccer. He was waived by the team in August 1999, having played just 11 games, scoring 4 goals.

After leaving Tampa, Gottardi went on loan at Deportivo Táchira in Venezuela, and then moved to Goiás in Brazil, his final club.

=== International ===
Gottardi was a member of the Bolivia national team, having competed in the qualifying tournament for the 1996 Atlanta Olympics, and in qualifying for the Copa América 1999 in Paraguay. In the end he only earned one senior cap, a friendly match against the United States.

== Personal life ==
His father, Toninho Gottardi, was a Brazilian who managed Oriente Petrolero.

His wife’s name is Veruschka Gotardi Wanderley and daughter’s name Alessia Gotardi Wanderley.

=== Health problems and death ===
While playing for Goiás in the Campeonato Brasileiro Série A, Gottardi began to suffer from "unusual problems with his heart", and was forced to retire from competitive play. He travelled to Cuba for treatment, to which he initially responded well, but was eventually diagnosed with ALS in July 2002. He suffered a heart attack on September 4, 2003, and died at the Virgen de la Asunción hospital in La Paz. He was 27 and was survived by his Brazilian wife Veruschka Vanderley and their 4-year-old daughter.

== See also ==
- List of foreign MLS players
