= Alberto Munoz (footballer) =

Venezuelan footballer (born 1981)

Personal information
- Date of birth: November 28, 1981 (age 44)
- Place of birth: Maracaibo, Venezuela
- Height: 5 ft 9 in (1.75 m)
- Position: Midfielder

Senior career*
Years	Team	Apps	(Gls)
2000	MLS Pro-40	8	(0)
2001	Tampa Bay Mutiny	2	(0)
2001	Carolina Dynamo	4	(0)
Total		14	(0)
- * Club domestic league appearances and goals

Alberto Munoz (born October 28, 1981) is a Venezuelan former soccer player who played for Tampa Bay Mutiny in the MLS.

== Career statistics ==
=== Club ===
Club	Season	League			Cup		Other		Total	
Club	Season	Division	Apps	Goals	Apps	Goals	Apps	Goals	Apps	Goals
MLS Pro-40	2000	USL A-League	8	0	0	0	0	0	8	0
Tampa Bay Mutiny	2001	MLS	2	0	0	0	0	0	2	0
Indiana Blast	2001	USISL D-3 Pro League	4	0	0	0	0	0	4	0
Career total			14	0	0	0	0	0	14	0
