= Alfonso Mondelo =

Spanish football coach

Alfonso Mondelo (born August 13, 1958 in Baracaldo, Spain) is a soccer coach.

Mondelo's coaching career includes many highlights, like the Puerto Rican national team, where he coached future United States of America (U.S.) National team star Chris Armas. He also coached the Long Island Rough Riders in the A-League. His big break came when he became the assistant coach for Major League Soccer's MetroStars, under Brazilian World Cup winning coach Carlos Alberto Parreira. When Parreira left, Mondelo was given the head job with the Metros. He coached the club in the 1998 season with a 14-17-0 record. He was fired with a game left in the regular season, when the MetroStars hired former U.S. national team coach Bora Milutinovic.

From 1999 to 2001, Mondelo was an assistant for the U.S. national team, under head coach Bruce Arena. He went back to MLS for the 2001 season to coach the Tampa Bay Mutiny. From 2002 until 2004 he was the director of coaching for the ENYYSA (Eastern New York Youth Soccer Association). He has remained very active as an assistant coach and consultant for U.S Soccer and in 2005, he was offered a job in the front office of Major League Soccer in New York City, where he now works in the player development department as the Director of Player Programs.
