= Alexi Lalas =

Greek American soccer player (born 1970)

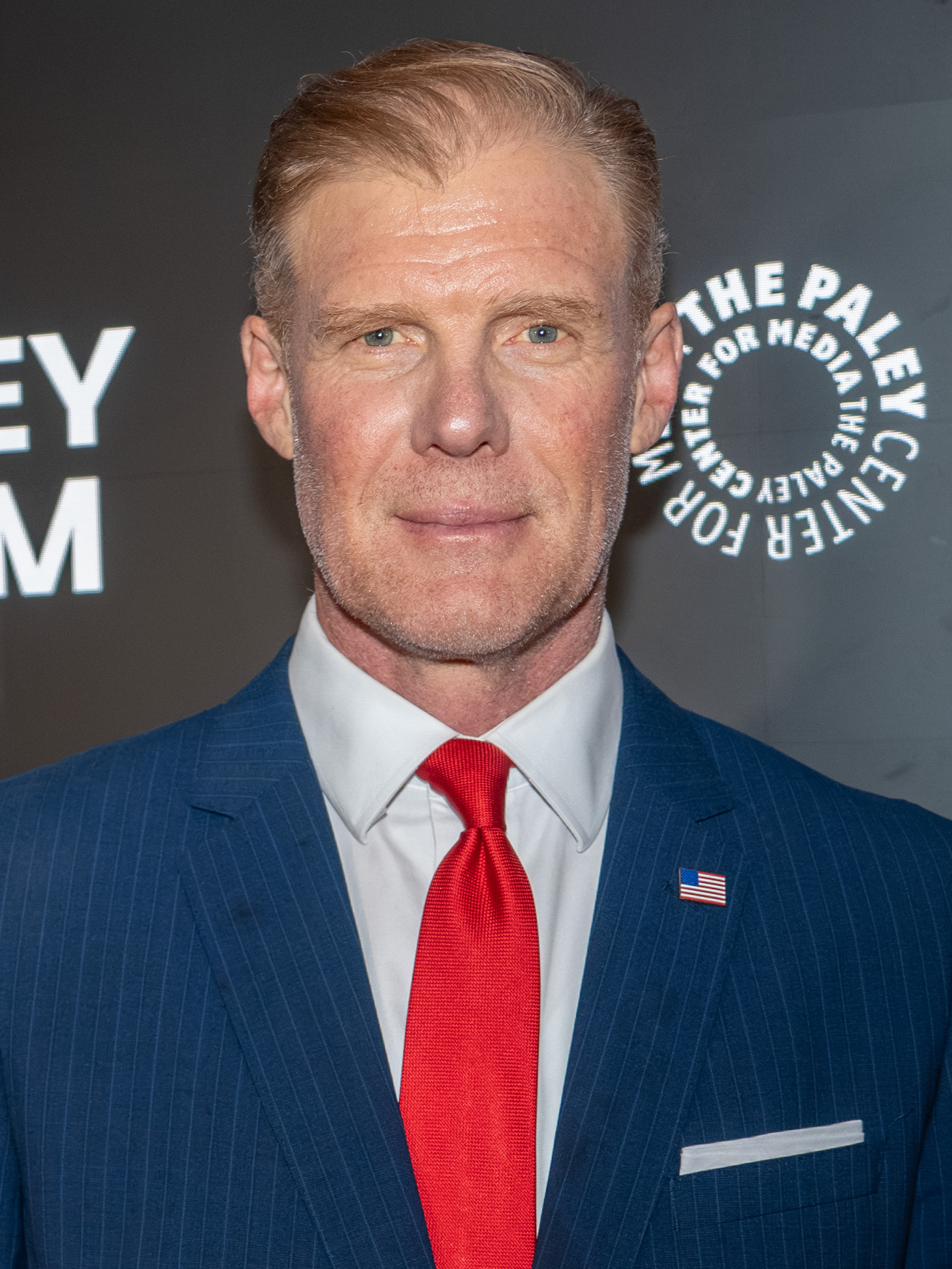
- Lalas in 2026

Personal information
- Full name: Panayotis Alexander Lalas
- Date of birth: June 1, 1970 (age 56)
- Place of birth: Birmingham, Michigan, U.S.
- Height: 6 ft 3 in (1.91 m)
- Position: Center-back

College career
Years	Team	Apps	(Gls)
1988–1991	Rutgers	81	(19)

Senior career*
Years	Team	Apps	(Gls)
1994–1995	Padova	33	(3)
1995–1996	→ Padova (loan) (Note: Signed by Major League Soccer (MLS) in 1995, but loaned back to Padova after the inaugural MLS season was postponed to 1996.)	11	(0)
1996–1997	New England Revolution	55	(3)
1997	→ Emelec (loan)	10	(0)
1998	MetroStars	25	(2)
1999	Kansas City Wizards	30	(4)
2001–2003	Los Angeles Galaxy	59	(7)
Total		223	(19)

International career
1992	United States U23	1	(0)
1996	United States Olympic (O.P.)	3	(0)
1991–1998	United States	96	(10)
- * Club domestic league appearances and goals

Panayotis Alexander Lalas (Greek: Παναγιώτης Αλέξανδρος Λαλάς; born June 1, 1970) is an American former soccer player and executive who is currently an analyst for Fox Sports.

A former center-back, Lalas is best known for his participation with the United States national team in the 1994 FIFA World Cup, where his distinctive long hair and beard made him a conspicuous player on the team. After the World Cup, he went on to become the first American in Italy's Serie A as a member of Padova.

In 1996, Lalas would return to the United States to take part in the newly formed Major League Soccer (MLS), as a member of the New England Revolution. He also played with Emelec of the Ecuadorian Serie A, and the MLS squads New York Red Bulls and Kansas City Wizards.

Nonetheless, his most successful time was with the Los Angeles Galaxy, with whom he won the CONCACAF Champions' Cup, U.S. Open Cup, and MLS Cup before retiring in 2003. His playing style was characterized by physicality and endurance.

Following his playing career, Lalas served as general manager of the San Jose Earthquakes, New York Red Bulls, and Los Angeles Galaxy of MLS. He was elected to the National Soccer Hall of Fame in 2006.

== Early life ==
Lalas was born in Birmingham, Michigan to a Greek father, Demetrios Lalas, and an Anglo-American mother, Anne Harding Woodworth. His father was a professor who later became the director of Greece's national observatory, while his mother is a widely published poet. His younger brother, Greg Lalas, was a former professional soccer player and previously the Chief Marketing Officer at United Soccer League.

== Club career ==
=== High school ===
Lalas attended Cranbrook Kingswood School in Bloomfield Hills, Michigan. Even though he did not begin playing soccer until he was 11, he had developed enough skills by his senior year to be named the 1987 Michigan High School Player of the Year. In addition to playing soccer, he was captain of his high school hockey team, which won the state championship.

=== College ===
Lalas attended Rutgers University, where after trying out, and playing some spring matches, and an indoor tournament in 1988, he played on the men's soccer team from 1988 to 1991. During his four seasons with the Scarlet Knights, he reached the NCAA Final Four in 1989 and the National Championship Game in 1990.

Lalas was named a third-team All-American in 1989 and 1990. In 1991, he gained first-team All-American recognition and was selected for both the Hermann Trophy and the Missouri Athletic Club Player of the Year award. As he did in high school, Lalas played hockey in college, leading the team in scoring in 1989.

Lalas left Rutgers in 1991 to focus on the U.S. national team despite being interested in finishing his degree. He resumed his education in 2013, when Rutgers began offering enough online classes, to fulfill what was required of Lalas to graduate. Lalas took 12 classes and 36 credits over 10 months to finish what he jokingly called "a 26-year plan", earning in 2014 a bachelor's degree in English with a minor in music.

After college and the 1992 Summer Olympics, Lalas trained with former Arsenal player Bob McNab in California. This led to a trial with Arsenal during the winter of 1992. It was quickly determined that Lalas did not have the quality that was needed for a first-team spot. As a result, Lalas only had a few training sessions with the reserve team before being cut. Lalas then returned home to Detroit and spent a month thinking about his future in soccer before coach Bora Milutinovic invited him for a United States tryout in Mission Viejo, California.

=== Padova ===
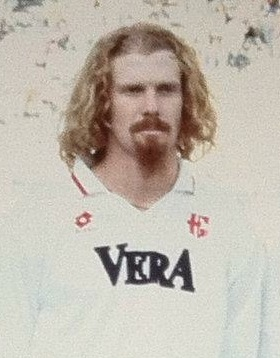
Lalas with Calcio Padova in 1994–1995

After the 1994 FIFA World Cup, Lalas signed with Italian Serie A club Padova. Padova finished the 1994–95 season 14th in the table. Only after winning a relegation play-off on June 10, 1995, did the team ensure its survival in the top ranks for the next season. On June 25, 1995, Major League Soccer (MLS) signed Lalas to play for one of the new teams. While MLS had intended to begin playing in 1995, it had run into difficulties which delayed the first season until 1996. In order to allow Lalas to maintain his match fitness, MLS loaned him back to Padova for the 1995–96 season. Lalas last played for Padova in a home game against Lazio on February 25, 1996.

=== Major League Soccer ===
Before the inaugural Major League Soccer (MLS) draft in February 1996, the league allocated high-profile players throughout the league's ten teams (except for the Dallas Burn, which alone amongst all MLS sides never received a U.S. national team allocation from the 1994 World Cup era). As part of this process, MLS placed Lalas with the New England Revolution on October 7, 1995.

Lalas was a regular on the Revs backline during the 1996 and 1997 seasons, starting 25 matches in 1996 and 29 in 1997. Lalas made his Revolution debut in the club's first-ever match, against Tampa Bay Mutiny on April 13, 1996, and recorded the first assist in Revolution history (in conjunction with Wélton), setting up Robert Ukrop for the team's first-ever goal, in the 20th minute. Lalas made his home debut on April 27 against D.C. United. He scored his first Revolution goal in the team's 4–2 win over Tampa Bay on August 26.

Lalas was named an MLS All Star in both 1996 and 1997, but famously clashed with Revolution head coach Frank Stapleton during the 1996 season, which ultimately resulted in being benched in August following a 6-1 drubbing to the San Jose Clash. Tensions arose after Lalas' Revolution teammate (and friend from his time in Padova) Giuseppe Galderisi was traded after only four games. Lalas referred to his Revolution tenure under Stapleton as a "joke" and a "nightmare from the beginning." At his request, the Revolution tried to trade Lalas during the summer transfer window, but could not find an interested party.

In November 1997, the Revolution loaned Lalas to Ecuadorian First Division Club Emelec for a month. He returned to New England at the end of December only to find himself traded to the MetroStars on February 4, 1998, in what would become the first three-team trade in MLS history.

The deal saw New England acquire Raúl Díaz Arce from D.C. United in exchange for Lalas and a second-round pick in the 1999 MLS College Draft, which were traded to the MetroStars, with the MetroStars’ second-round pick in the 1999 MLS College Draft and future considerations going to D.C. United along with New England's first-round pick in the 1999 MLS College Draft. He spent the 1998 season with the MetroStars before being traded, along with Tony Meola, to the Kansas City Wizards for Mark Chung and Mike Ammann on January 28, 1999. Lalas spent one season with the Wizards before announcing his retirement on October 10, 1999. Lalas was named to the MLS All-Star team in both the 1998 and 1999 seasons.

Just over a year later, he returned to the pitch when he signed with the Los Angeles Galaxy as a discovery player on January 16, 2001. Lalas' tenure with the Galaxy was some of the most decorated of his career. In 2001, Lalas helped the Galaxy win the 2000 CONCACAF Champions' Cup and also the 2001 U.S. Open Cup (the latter against his former club, New England). The next year, Lalas helped the Galaxy win the 2002 Supporters' Shield and MLS Cup 2002 (the latter against his former club, New England). He was named to the 2002 MLS Best XI. Nearly three years later, he retired again, this time permanently on January 12, 2004.

== International career ==
Lalas earned 96 caps, scoring nine goals, with the United States national team between 1991 and 1998. His first cap came in a 2–2 tie with Mexico on March 12, 1992, in the 1991 NAFC Championship. He gained his second cap four days later in a 2–0 win over Canada. While he started both games, he did not gain another cap until he came on for Fernando Clavijo in a 2–2 tie with Denmark on January 30, 1993.

His next game, a start, came on March 23, 1993, in a 2–2 tie with El Salvador. While he became a fixture on the team through the rest of 1993, he did not cement his position as a starter in the U.S. central defense until the beginning of 1994. He went on to start and play all ninety minutes in the four U.S. games of the 1994 FIFA World Cup and was named an honorable mention All-Star. On June 11, 1995, Lalas flew directly from a relegation playoff game with his club team, Padova, in order to appear in the second half of a 1995 U.S. Cup victory over Nigeria. His contributions to the national team led to his selection as the 1995 U.S. Soccer Athlete of the Year.

He also scored in a game against Saudi Arabia, in which the United States had their biggest comeback in their history (from 3–0 to 4–3; Lalas scored the first goal for the United States). While Lalas was on the roster for the U.S. at the 1998 FIFA World Cup, he never entered a game. His last cap had come in the final U.S. tuneup for the finals, a May 30, 1998, scoreless tie with Scotland where he was a second-half substitute for Earnie Stewart.

Lalas was part of the United States Olympic soccer team for the 1992 Summer Olympics in Spain. He was also selected as overage player on the United States Olympic soccer team at the 1996 Summer Olympics.

== Post-playing career ==
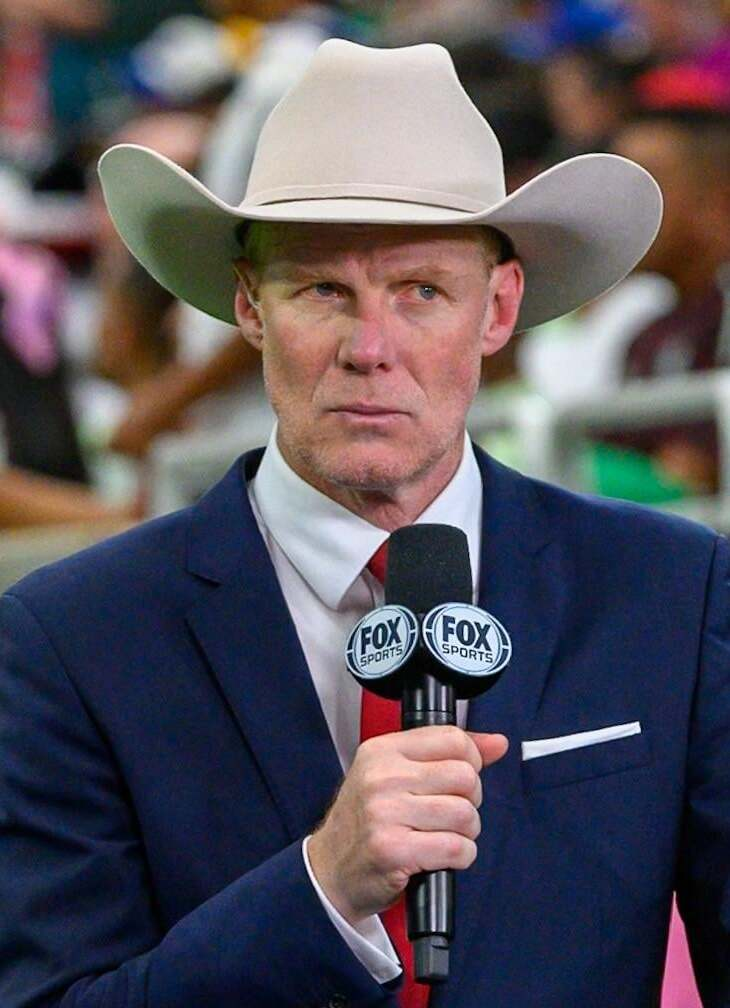
Lalas in 2025

Lalas served as president and general manager of the San Jose Earthquakes during the 2004 and 2005 MLS seasons. He served as a general manager of the MetroStars/New York Red Bulls from 2005 to 2006. Lalas served as President of the LA Galaxy from 2006 to 2008 during which time the club signed David Beckham.

Following his time at the Galaxy, Lalas spent six years as a commentator for ESPN before signing a commentary deal with Fox Sports. He also appeared in both FIFA 16 and FIFA 17, by EA Sports, as a legend card, having an 86 rated center back card in both iterations of the game. Currently, Lalas alongside pundit David Mosse, host the podcast State of the Union, dedicated to deliberating over American soccer.

== Television appearances ==
In 2026, Lalas competed in season fourteen of The Masked Singer as "High Voltage" which was a robot with plugs for hands. Despite being eliminated on "Care Bears Night", he did voice his disdain that the panelists guessed that an object in the shape of a soccer ball was placed in the costume's domed helmet mask at the last minute.

== Personal life ==
Lalas is married to Anne Rewey; they have two children.

Lalas is a Republican and endorsed Ron DeSantis in the 2024 United States presidential election. During the election, he ultimately voted for Donald Trump and has remained a supporter since the election: "I voted for Donald Trump multiple times, proudly, and I am happy in terms of the direction of the country (and) the things he is doing." On social media, he has posted messages supporting the MAGA movement and Trump talking points.

Lalas is a fan of the hair metal band Ratt.

== Musical career ==
Lalas has released eight solo albums over the past three decades: Far from Close (1996), Ginger (1998), So It Goes (2010), Infinity Spaces (2014), Shots (2016), Sunshine (2018), Look at You (2019) and Melt Away (2022). With a noted affinity for rock music since college, Lalas played in a band named The Gypsies, opening for Hootie & the Blowfish during a European tour in 1998. The Gypsies were featured in a self-produced, self-distributed album, Woodland, released by Lalas during the 1994 World Cup.

== Career statistics ==
=== Club ===
Appearances and goals by club, season and competition
Club	Season	League			National Cup		League Cup		Continental		Total	
Club	Season	Division	Apps	Goals	Apps	Goals	Apps	Goals	Apps	Goals	Apps	Goals
Padova	1994–95	Serie A	33	3								
Padova (loan)	1995–96	Serie A	11	0								
New England Revolution	1996	Major League Soccer	25	1								
New England Revolution	1997	Major League Soccer	30	2								
New England Revolution	Total		55	3								
Emelec (loan)	1997	Ecuadorian Serie A	10	0								
MetroStars	1998	Major League Soccer	25	2								
Kansas City Wizards	1999	Major League Soccer	30	4								
Los Angeles Galaxy	2001	Major League Soccer	11	2								
Los Angeles Galaxy	2002	Major League Soccer	26	4								
Los Angeles Galaxy	2003	Major League Soccer	22	1								
Los Angeles Galaxy	Total		59	7								
Career total			223	19								

=== International ===
Scores and results list the United States' goal tally first, score column indicates score after each Lalas goal.

List of international goals scored by Alexi Lalas
No.	Date	Venue	Opponent	Score	Result	Competition
1	May 8, 1993	Miami, United States	Colombia	1–0	1–2	Friendly
2	June 9, 1993	Foxboro, United States	England	2–0	2–0	1993 U.S. Cup
3	June 22, 1993	Estadio Olímpico Atahualpa, Ecuador	Venezuela	2–0	3–3	1993 Copa América
4	July 17, 1993	Dallas, United States	Honduras	1–0	1–0	1993 CONCACAF Gold Cup
5	November 7, 1993	Fullerton, United States	Jamaica	1–0	1–0	Friendly
6	January 29, 1994	Seattle, United States	Russia	1–1	1–1	Friendly
7	July 14, 1995	Paysandú, Uruguay	Argentina	2–0	3–0	1995 Copa América
8	October 8, 1995	Washington, D.C., United States	Saudi Arabia	1–3	4–3	Friendly
9	February 1, 1997	Guangzhou, China	China	1–0	1–1	Friendly
10	June 17, 1997	Jacksonville, United States	Israel	1–0	2–1	Friendly

== Honors ==
Los Angeles Galaxy

- MLS Cup: 2002
- Supporters' Shield: 2002
- Lamar Hunt U.S. Open Cup: 2001
- CONCACAF Champions' Cup: 2000

United States

- U.S. Cup: 1995
- 1991 Pan American Games Gold Medal

Individual

- Hermann Trophy: 1991
- Missouri Athletic Club Player of the Year: 1991
- Honda Player of the Year: 1995
- U.S. Soccer Athlete of the Year: 1995
- MLS Best XI: 2002
- MLS All-Star: 1996, 1997, 1998, 1999
