= 1997 MLS All-Star Game =

Soccer game played in East Rutherford, New Jersey

MLS All-Star Game 1997
- Event: 1997 Major League Soccer season
MLS East	MLS West
(United States)	(United States)
5	4
- Date: July 9, 1997
- Venue: Giants Stadium, East Rutherford, New Jersey
- Man of the Match: Carlos Valderrama (MLS East)
- Referee: Arturo Angeles
- Attendance: 24,816

The 1997 Major League Soccer All-Star Game was the second Major League Soccer All-Star Game, a soccer match involving all-stars from Major League Soccer. Teams of the best players from each conference played against each other at Giants Stadium, East Rutherford, on July 9, 1997. The MLS All-Stars East won the game 5–4, with goals from MVP Carlos Valderrama, Giuseppe Galderisi, Robert Warzycha, Richie Williams and Brian McBride. Dante Washington, Jorge Campos, Digital Takawira and Cobi Jones scored for the MLS All-Stars West. Arturo Angeles refereed the game, which was attended by 24,816 spectators.

== Venue ==
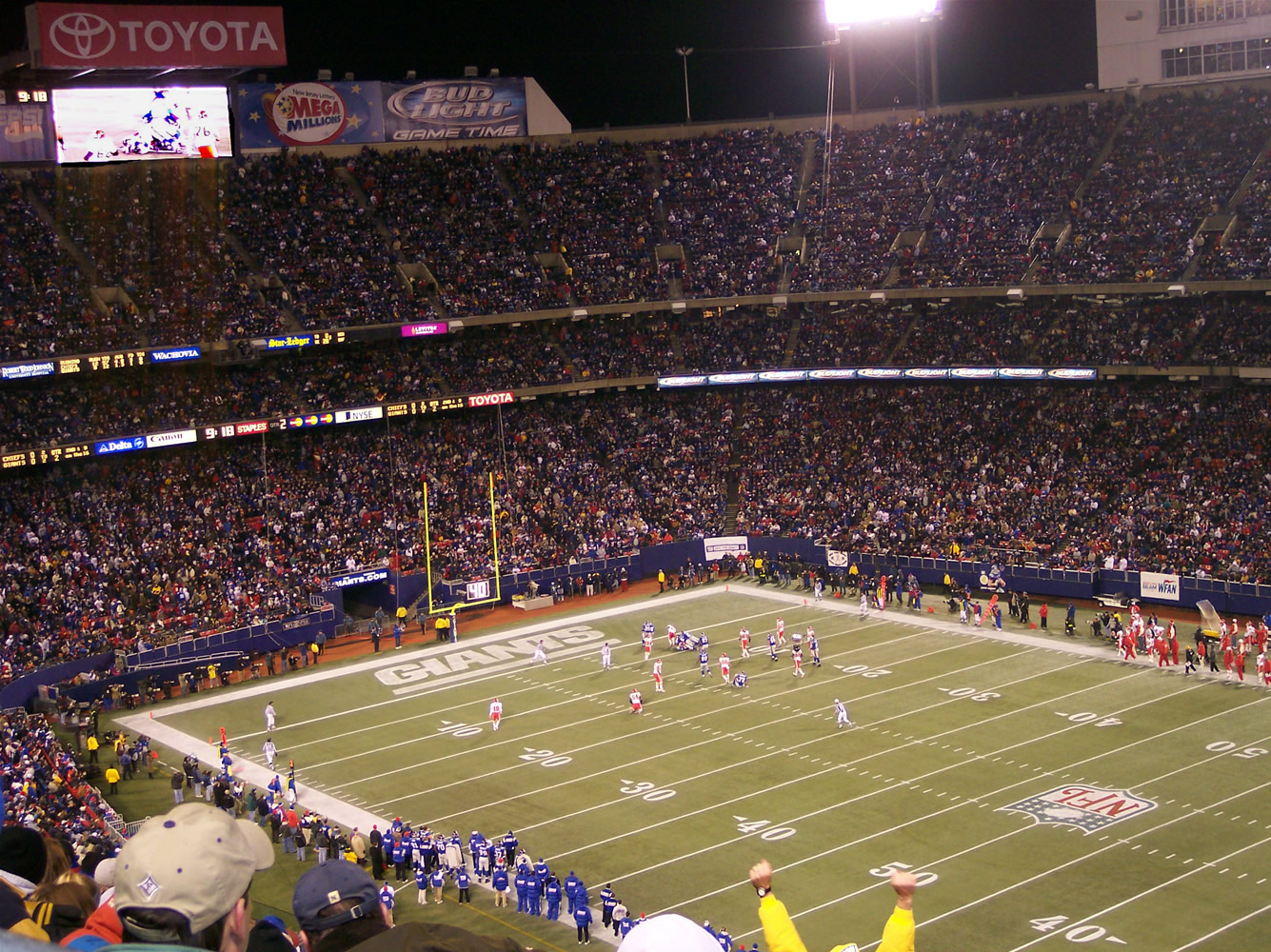
Giants Stadium hosted the match, which had an attendance of 24,816

== Match details ==
1997 MLS All-Star Game
July 9, 1997

MLS East (United States)	5–4	(United States) MLS West
Valderrama 50'; Galderisi 63'; Warzycha 66'; Williams 70'; McBride 88'	Report	Washington 11'; Campos 44'; Takawira 80'; Jones 86'

Giants Stadium, East Rutherford, NJ
Attendance: 24,816
Referee: Arturo Angeles

East
West

GK	1	(Italy) Walter Zenga	(substituted off) 46'
DF	23	(United States) Eddie Pope	(substituted off) 46'
DF	22	(United States) Alexi Lalas	(substituted off) 46'
DF	12	(United States) Jeff Agoos
MF	19	(Poland) Robert Warzycha		(substituted off) 79'
MF	6	(United States) John Harkes	(substituted off) 46'
MF	7	(Italy) Roberto Donadoni	(substituted off) 28'
MF	8	(Colombia) Carlos Valderrama
MF	10	(Bolivia) Marco Etcheverry	(substituted off) 46'
FW	2	(El Salvador) Raúl Díaz Arce	(substituted off) 46'	(substituted in) 79'
FW	9	(Bolivia) Jaime Moreno	(substituted off) 46'
Substitutions:
GK	18	(United States) Tony Meola	(substituted in) 46'
DF	4	(United States) Ted Chronopoulos	(substituted in) 46'
DF	5	(Canada) Frank Yallop	(substituted in) 46'
MF	16	(United States) Richie Williams	(substituted in) 46'
MF	14	(United States) Steve Ralston	(substituted in) 28'
FW	20	(Italy) Giuseppe Galderisi	(substituted in) 46'
FW	11	(Mozambique) Chiquinho Conde	(substituted in) 46'
FW	15	(United States) Brian McBride	(substituted in) 46'
Coach:

GK	1	(United States) Mark Dodd		(substituted off) 58'
DF	2	(Argentina) Diego Soñora
DF	4	(Scotland) Richard Gough	(substituted off) 46'
DF	17	(United States) Marcelo Balboa	(substituted off) 46'
MF	19	(United States) Chris Henderson
MF	6	(United States) Damian Silvera	(substituted off) 46'
MF	10	(El Salvador) Mauricio Cienfuegos
MF	8	(United States) Preki	(substituted off) 46'
MF	66	(Switzerland) Alain Sutter	(substituted off) 35'
FW	12	(Zimbabwe) Digital Takawira	(substituted off) 46'	(substituted in) 58'
FW	14	(United States) Dante Washington	(substituted off) 46'
Substitutions:
GK	9	(Mexico) Jorge Campos	(substituted in) 35'
DF	3	(United States) John Doyle	(substituted in) 46'
MF	7	(United States) Mark Santel	(substituted in) 46'
MF	23	(United States) Cobi Jones	(substituted in) 46'
MF	13	(United States) Mark Chung	(substituted in) 46'
FW	5	(Scotland) Mo Johnston	(substituted in) 46'
FW	20	(El Salvador) Ronald Cerritos	(substituted in) 46'
Coach:

Most Valuable Player:
(Colombia) Carlos Valderrama (MLS East)

Assistant referees:
Jorge Reyes
Thomas Bobadilla
