= Erik Imler =

American soccer player and coach (born 1971)

Personal information
- Full name: Erik Bradley Imler
- Date of birth: June 1, 1971 (age 55)
- Place of birth: Silver Spring, Maryland, U.S.
- Height: 5 ft 9 in (1.75 m)
- Positions: Midfielder; defender

College career
Years	Team	Apps	(Gls)
1989–1992	Virginia Cavaliers		

Senior career*
Years	Team	Apps	(Gls)
1994	Delaware Wizards	4	(0)
1995	Raleigh Flyers	23	(6)
1996	D.C. United	19	(0)
1997	Worcester Wildfire		
1997	New England Revolution	15	(0)
1998–1999	Charleston Battery	1	(0)
1999	Lehigh Valley Steam	24	(0)

International career
- United States U17
- United States U20
1992	United States U23		
1993	United States	1	(0)

Managerial career
- 1993: Virginia Cavaliers (assistant)
- 1998–1999: The Citadel Bulldogs (assistant)
- 2008: Belmont Abbey College
- 2010: United States U17 (assistant)
- 2021: Stumptown AC (assistant)
- * Club domestic league appearances and goals

Erik Bradley Imler (born June 1, 1971) is an American soccer coach and former player. He won national championships while playing at the University of Virginia before becoming part of the US team that competed at the 1992 Summer Olympics in Barcelona. He is currently an assistant coach for Stumptown AC in the National Independent Soccer Association.

== Youth and college ==
Imler grew up in Maryland, attending Bowie High School in Bowie, Maryland. In 1989, his senior year, he was named a Parade Magazine high school All-American soccer player. After high school, he attended the University of Virginia where he played as a defender and defensive midfielder on the men's soccer team from 1989 to 1992. During his four season at Virginia, the Cavaliers took the NCAA title twice (1991 and 1992) and were co-champions once (1989). In 1992, he was the team captain as a senior. Imler was a two-time second-team All-American. While at Virginia, he majored in sports medicine. In 2000, SoccerAmerica magazine named Imler to its College Team of the Century.

== Professional ==
In 1994, Imler played for the Delaware Wizards of USISL. In 1995, he moved to the Raleigh Flyers. In February 1996, D.C. United of Major League Soccer (MLS) drafted Imler in the third round (30th overall) in the 1996 MLS Inaugural Player Draft. He spent the 1996 season in central defense with United, playing in nineteen games as the team took both the 1996 MLS Cup and 1996 U.S. Open Cup titles. United released Imler in 1997 and he signed with the Worcester Wildfire of USISL. At the same time, he pursued a return to MLS and had a two-week try out with the New England Revolution. On May 7, 1997, the Revs signed Imler as a Discovery Player after impressing the coaches during his trial. The Revs waived Imler on November 10, 1997. In 1998, he signed with the Charleston Battery, but tore his anterior cruciate ligament during a pre-season game which led to his losing the entire 1998 season. In 1999, Imler played one game, twelve minutes total, for the Charleston Battery. The Battery then released him and he finished the season, and his career, with the Lehigh Valley Steam.

== National and Olympic teams ==
Imler was a member of the U.S. team at the 1987 U-16 World Cup in Canada. He then went on to play with the U.S. U-20 national team, but was not a member of the team at any cups. In 1991, Imler was part of the U.S. gold winning soccer team at the Pan American Games.

He then continued to play for the U-23 national team leading up to the 1992 Summer Olympics. Imler started all six games as the U.S. qualified for the tournament. He was then named to the U.S. soccer team for the games. At the Olympics, the U.S. went 1–1–1 and did not qualify for the second round.

On March 23, 1993, Imler earned his only caps with the U.S. national team in a 2–2 tie with El Salvador. However, in the 43d minute, he tore ligaments in his right knee during the game and was replaced by Yari Allnutt who scored a goal. Imler never appeared again for the senior national team.

== Coach ==
Since retiring from playing professionally, Imler has held several positions as a youth soccer coach. He was a Director of Coaching and team coach with Charlotte Soccer Academy in North Carolina. In May 2008, Imler became the head coach of the Belmont Abbey College women's soccer coach. He took the team to a 17–3–3 record in his only season as head coach. In September 2010, Imler became an assistant coach with the United States men's national under-17 soccer. In March 2021, he joined National Independent Soccer Association side Stumptown AC as an assistant coach.
