= Walter Zenga =

Italian footballer and manager

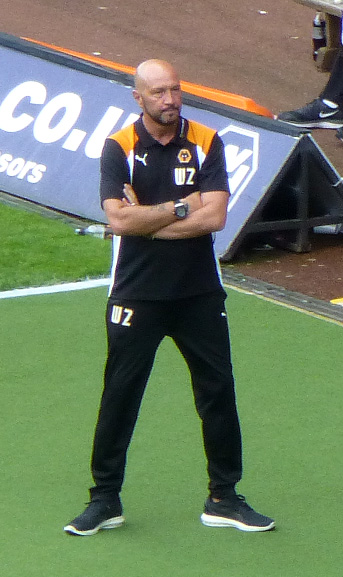
- Zenga coaching Wolverhampton Wanderers in 2016

Personal information
- Full name: Walter Zenga
- Date of birth: 28 April 1960 (age 66)
- Place of birth: Milan, Italy
- Height: 1.88 m (6 ft 2 in)
- Position: Goalkeeper

Youth career
- 1969–1971: Macallesi 1927
- 1971–1978: Inter Milan

Senior career*
Years	Team	Apps	(Gls)
1978–1994	Inter Milan	328	(0)
1978–1979	→ Salernitana (loan)	3	(0)
1979–1980	→ Savona (loan)	23	(0)
1980–1982	→ Sambenedettese (loan)	67	(0)
1994–1996	Sampdoria	41	(0)
1996–1997	Padova	21	(0)
1997–1998	New England Revolution	22	(0)
1998–1999	New England Revolution	25	(0)
Total		530	(0)

International career
1984–1986	Italy U21	15	(0)
1984	Italy Olympic	1	(0)
1986–1992	Italy	58	(0)

Managerial career
- 1998–1999: New England Revolution (player/coach)
- 2000–2001: Brera
- 2002–2003: Naţional București
- 2003: Naţional București (technical director)
- 2004–2005: Steaua București
- 2005–2006: Red Star Belgrade
- 2006–2007: Gaziantepspor
- 2007: Al-Ain
- 2007: Dinamo București
- 2008–2009: Catania
- 2009: Palermo
- 2010: Al-Nassr
- 2011–2013: Al-Nasr
- 2013–2014: Al-Jazira
- 2015: Sampdoria
- 2015–2016: Al-Shaab
- 2016: Wolverhampton Wanderers
- 2017–2018: Crotone
- 2018–2019: Venezia
- 2020: Cagliari
- 2023–2024: Persita Tangerang (technical director)
- 2024: Emirates
- 2024–2025: Siracusa (club manager)
Medal record
Men's football
Representing Italy
FIFA World Cup
Third place	1990 Italy
UEFA European Championship
Third place	1988 West Germany
UEFA European Under-21 Championship
Second place	1986 UEFA
- * Club domestic league appearances and goals

Walter Zenga Cavaliere OMRI (Italian pronunciation: [ˈvalter ˈdzeŋɡa, - ˈdzɛŋ-]; born 28 April 1960) is an Italian professional football manager and former player.

He is regarded as "one of the greatest goalkeepers of his generation", and "one of Italy's best keepers ever".

He was a long-time goalkeeper for Inter Milan and the Italy national team. During his playing career, Zenga was part of the Italian squad that finished fourth at the 1984 Olympics in Los Angeles and was the starting goalkeeper for the Italian team that finished third in the 1990 FIFA World Cup tournament held in Italy, keeping a World Cup record unbeaten streak, until broken by Unai Simón in 2026. A three-time winner of the IFFHS World's Best Goalkeeper Award, Zenga is regarded by pundits as one of the best goalkeepers of all time, and in 2013 was voted the eighth best goalkeeper of the past quarter-century by IFFHS. In 2000, he also placed 20th in the World Keeper of the Century Elections by the same organisation.

After retiring as a player, Zenga briefly became an actor in an Italian soap opera and also a pundit on Italian TV. Since 1998 he has worked as a head coach and managed clubs in the United States, Italy, Turkey, Romania, Serbia, Saudi Arabia, the United Arab Emirates and England.

== Club career ==
Zenga joined Inter Milan in 1982, after starting his professional career in 1978 in the lower divisions of Italian football (his first team was Salernitana in Serie C1, and he also played for Savona and Sambenedettese). Initially, (in the 1982–83 season) he was the substitute of Ivano Bordon, who was one of the top Italian goalkeepers of his era, as he had been Dino Zoff's reserve in the 1982 FIFA World Cup. However, Zenga played Inter's matches in the Coppa Italia, impressing enough that the club decided not to buy another goalkeeper after Bordon's decision to move to Sampdoria during the summer of 1983. Zenga became Inter's starting goalkeeper in the 1983–84 season, where he conceded only 23 goals, better than any other goalkeeper in that season.

The next season would prove to be bittersweet for Zenga: although he continued to play excellently, he did not manage to win any trophies. In Italy, Inter was the main rival of Hellas Verona who won the first and, to this day, only Scudetto of its history in 1985, while in Europe he had to suffer two bitter and quite controversial defeats at the hands of Spanish giants Real Madrid, both times in the UEFA Cup semi-finals. However, personal success was growing: he became a fan favourite due to his qualities and his love for the team, his fame was now nationwide thanks to his larger than life personality and he quickly established himself as one of the premier goalkeepers of the country, which led to him being called up to Italy's squad for the 1986 World Cup.

Apart from enjoying the selection for a World Cup, the summer of 1986 proved to be important for Zenga also at club level. In fact, Inter signed Giovanni Trapattoni, who left Juventus after a highly successful 10-year stint, to manage the team. Meanwhile, the trio formed by Zenga, Giuseppe Bergomi and Riccardo Ferri (who respectively occupied the positions of goalkeeper, right-sided full-back, and man-marking centre-back/stopper) was becoming the cornerstone of the team and of the Italian team also. In the 1986–87 season. Inter closely fought Napoli for the Scudetto, finishing third despite a series of injuries which plagued the team in the final weeks of the season (among others, Marco Tardelli, Alessandro Altobelli and Karl-Heinz Rummenigge had to watch the final matches from the bench). However, Zenga imposed himself as the best goalkeeper in Italy, finishing the 30 matches-long season conceding only 17 goals and by being picked by new Italy's manager Azeglio Vicini as the starter in the goalkeeping position.

The next season would prove to be disappointing for Inter and Zenga: the team struggled all the season, due to lack of compatibility between the two main forwards (team's captain Altobelli and the newly acquired Aldo Serena) and between the two offensive midfielders Gianfranco Matteoli and the Belgian Vincenzo Scifo. Plus Zenga, dissatisfied with the way the club was managed, decided to leave Inter and join the then dominant Napoli. However, the move did not materialize and Zenga remained with Inter. The highlight of the season for Zenga was the participation in the 1988 UEFA European Championships with Italy.

However, the next season would prove to be one of the best for Inter and Zenga. The team, reinvigorated by the acquisitions of the young Italians Alessandro Bianchi and Nicola Berti, the Germans Andreas Brehme and Lothar Matthäus from Bayern Munich and the Argentine Ramón Díaz dominated the season, winning the league title with a record haul of 58 points and breaking several other records during the year. Such a performance is even more impressive if the whole quality of the tournament is taken in consideration: in second position there was the Diego Maradona-led Napoli and in third position the star-studded and future European champion Milan. Zenga ended the season conceding only 19 goals, the best goalkeeper again in that respect.

The 1989–90 and 1990–91 seasons proved to be bittersweet for Inter: although the team remained a title contender, it didn't manage to take another success on home soil, except for the victory in the Supercoppa Italiana played in November 1989 against Sampdoria. The 1991 season turned out to be a close fight between Inter and Sampdoria, with the title decided in a match played in Milan, which Inter would lose 0–2 allowing Gianluca Vialli and Roberto Mancini to win the league title. However, Inter won the UEFA Cup that year, defeating, among the others, Aston Villa, Atalanta and Sporting CP on the road to the final against Roma. Inter won the first match 2–0 and lost only 1–0 in Rome, achieving the first European success since the 1960s. After that match, manager Giovanni Trapattoni left the team, as he decided to return as coach of Juventus.

On a personal scale, Zenga experienced in these seasons the peak of his career. For three consecutive years (1989–1991) he was nominated by IFFHS the best goalkeeper in the world, ahead of goalkeepers like Michel Preud'homme, Rinat Dasaev and Andoni Zubizarreta. Zenga was at his best between the posts, as his great explosiveness and sharp reflexes enabled him to make great and spectacular saves. Not known for being a great penalty saver (frequently dropping down to the ground in the middle of the goal), in his career he did however save penalty kicks from Roberto Baggio, Michel Platini and Paul Merson.

Zenga continued to play for Inter until 1994, winning the UEFA Cup in 1991 and 1994, his last season with the club.

In 1994, Zenga transferred to Sampdoria, and then to Padova two years later.

=== New England Revolution ===
On March 4, 1997, Major League Soccer allocated Zenga to the New England Revolution. He made his Revolution debut in the 1997 season opener on March 29, a 1–0 victory over the Dallas Burn. He made his home debut on April 20, in a 2–1 victory over the Tampa Bay Mutiny. During a game versus the Tampa Bay Mutiny, he celebrated a goal by running to the sidelines and making out with his girlfriend, as the Mutiny barely missed the open net straight from the kickoff.

In June On July 20, the club placed Zenga on injured reserve following a knee injury. He would fly to Italy following the Revolution's 4–2 victory over Tampa Bay on July 18 for arthroscopic surgery. Scott Coufal and Jeff Causey would fill in for Zenga until his return to net on September 12. Zenga was awarded MLS Player of the Month honors for the month of September, the first Revolution player to ever win the award. Despite missing time, Zenga was a finalist for the 1997 MLS Goalkeeper of the Year Award. He additionally represented the Revolution in the 1997 MLS All-Star Game, and won the team's Most Valuable Player Award. Prior to the All-Star game, at a fan event in Federal Hill, Providence, Rhode Island, then-Providence Mayor Buddy Cianci presented Zenga with a bottle of his personal marinara sauce, "Mayor’s Own Marinara Sauce." The Revolution supporter's group the Midnight Riders named Zenga their 1997 "Man of the Year."

On January 15, 1998, Zenga announced his retirement. He had led the Revolution to their first playoff berth in team history, and he finished the 1997 season with the second best goals-against average (1.27), second highest win total (15), and best league shootout record, allowing only 12 goals in 41 attempts. Despite his retirement, Zenga would continue his affiliation with the club as a part-time European scout.

Zenga departed the Revolution to pursue an acting career (he and his girlfriend starred in an Italian soap opera), however he would return on August 24, 1998, being named Revolution head coach after the resignation of Thomas Rongen on the same day. Zenga led the Revolution to a 3–3 record in the final 6 matches of the 1998 New England Revolution season.

Zenga stipulated that he would only return to the Revolution for the 1999 season if he could play as well as coach, and he became the Revolution's (and league's) first-ever player/coach on October 28, 1998. As a player-manager, Zenga led the Revolution to a 10–20 record. After issuing an ultimatum, demanding contract extension discussions begin prior to the season's end, Zenga was relieved of his duties on September 30, with interim manager Steve Nicol being brought in to conclude the season.

== International career ==
Zenga was capped 58 times for the Italy national football team at senior level between 1987 and 1992. In these, he conceded only 21 goals (0.36 per game) and kept 41 clean sheets (70.69%), both averages being a record for the Italy national team. He previously featured in the Italian squad at the 1984 Olympics, where the team managed a fourth-place finish, and also featured as one of the Italy under-21 side's overage players at the 1986 UEFA European Under-21 Championship, as the team's starting goalkeeper. He was also included in Enzo Bearzot's 22-man Italy squad for the 1986 World Cup. Initially selected as the team's third goalkeeper behind Fiorentina's Giovanni Galli and Roma's Franco Tancredi, his name was taken in consideration by Bearzot before the match against the Michel Platini-led France due to the poor performances of Galli (who, in the end, also played against France).

Zenga became the Italy national side's starting goalkeeper under manager Azeglio Vicini, ahead of his perceived career rival, Stefano Tacconi. During the 1988 UEFA European Championships, Zenga played all four of Italy's matches (a 1–1 draw against West Germany, a 1–0 victory over Spain, and a 2–0 win over Denmark in the group stage matches, and a 0–2 loss against the Soviet Union in the semi-final). Here again Zenga was at the centre of controversy: in the first match against West Germany he conceded a free kick inside the penalty area due to having made too many steps while carrying the ball in his hands (an infringement rarely penalised). Andreas Brehme, who would become Zenga's teammate at Inter only a few months later, scored from the resulting free kick to tie the game for West Germany. Italy reached the semi-finals of the competition.

Zenga remained first choice goalkeeper when Italy hosted the World Cup in 1990, and helped the team to a third-place finish, during which he set a record of five consecutive clean sheets, and a total of 517 minutes without conceding a goal, only broken by Unai Simón at the 2026 FIFA World Cup. His unbeaten streak was ended by Claudio Caniggia's header in the semi-finals against defending champions Argentina, after Zenga had made an error when coming out to collect a cross; following a 1–1 draw after extra-time, Argentina advanced to the final 4–3 on penalties, while Zenga failed to stop a single spot kick in the shoot-out. In the third-place match against England, Zenga conceded his second goal of the tournament when he was beaten by a David Platt header, although Italy managed to capture the bronze medal with a 2–1 victory.

After Italy had failed to qualify for the 1992 European Championship, Arrigo Sacchi was appointed as Italy's new manager, and he eventually excluded Zenga from his side, in favour of goalkeepers who were more suited to his zonal marking defensive system, such as Gianluca Pagliuca, and Luca Marchegiani.

== Style of play ==
An aggressive, consistent, physically strong, complete, and athletic goalkeeper, Zenga was nicknamed Deltaplano ("Hang glider") due to his excellent shot-stopping abilities, positioning, explosive reactions, bravery, and in particular for his speed, elegance, and agility, which enabled him to produce spectacular saves. Despite his reputation, the media was often critical of Zenga's penalty-saving record throughout his career, although he stopped penalties against notable specialists, such as Roberto Baggio, Paul Merson and Michel Platini; he was also criticised by pundits for his unsteady performances when coming out off his line to claim crosses, and performed best between the posts, while he was also not particularly adept with the ball at his feet, or very confident in his distribution, and initially struggled in teams which employed a zonal marking defensive system and the offside trap, due to his reluctancy to rush out of goal. Nevertheless, he was able to adapt successfully to the changes in regulations following the introduction of the back-pass rule, and maintained a high level of performance as his career progressed, even as goalkeepers were required to play more frequently with their feet. In addition to his goalkeeping ability, Zenga also stood out for his strong mentality and leadership from the back, as well as his temper and flamboyant celebrations as a footballer, and was also known for his composure under pressure, which enabled him not to be fazed if he ever made any errors.

His other nickname, L'Uomo Ragno ("Spider-Man"), is not related to his goalkeeping skills, but rather to a curious circumstance: in 1992, while answering questions about his exclusion from the Italy national team, Zenga softly sang a song by the Italian band 883, called Hanno ucciso l'Uomo Ragno ("Someone killed Spider-Man"), which led pundits and supporters to call him like the Marvel Comics character.

== Managerial career ==
=== Early career ===
Zenga became the head coach of the New England Revolution on August 24, 1998, replacing Thomas Rongen for the final six matches of the 1998 season. On October 28, Zenga was announced as Player-Manager of New England Revolution heading into the 1999 season. His tenure as Player-Manager would last less than one full campaign, as he was replaced with two matches left to play, following the Revolution's 1–0 loss to the Dallas Burn, on September 30, 1999. After he left the club, Zenga retired from active football, choosing to pursue a coaching career.

After a short stint with Milanese Serie D team Brera, Zenga moved to Romania in 2002, first managing Naţional București and then Steaua București, where he won the domestic title and reached the Round of 16 of the 2004–05 UEFA Cup after eliminating UEFA Cup winners Valencia from the competition.

In the summer 2005, after being fired from Steaua București before the end of the season, Zenga joined Red Star Belgrade, leading the Serbo-Montenegrin team to a double (national league and national cup).

In the summer 2006, Zenga was appointed coach of Turkish Süper Lig side Gaziantepspor; however, after a poor start (five wins in 17 league matches), he resigned in January 2007 in order to accept an offer from United Arab Emirates club Al-Ain.

After just five months in charge, Al-Ain sacked Zenga, who was announced in September 2007 as new Dinamo București coach, replacing Mircea Rednic, but he resigned only two months later following a 1–0 loss in a local derby lost to Steaua. He then accepted a job as a football commentator and pundit for Italian public broadcasting service RAI.

=== Catania ===
On 1 April 2008, he agreed to replace resigning boss Silvio Baldini as manager of Catania. He made his Serie A debut on 6 April with a 3–0 home win against Napoli, leading them to a dramatic relegation escape during the final minutes of the league, after a 1–1 home draw against Roma.

Confirmed at the helm of Catania for the 2008–09 season, Zenga proved to be fit for the Italian top flight, leading the rossoazzurri to impressive results in the early part of the season, and agreeing a one-year contract extension with the Sicilian club.

Catania's playing style under Zenga was notable for the coach's focus on free kick planning; his assistant manager Gianni Vio is known to work exclusively on this particular side of football tactics during the weekly training sessions. He guided Catania to a mid-table finish and the Serie A points record for the eastern Sicilian side; at the final home game of the season he announced he was parting company with his club by mutual consent.

=== Palermo ===
On 5 June 2009, after being linked with the managerial job at Lazio it was revealed that Zenga had agreed a three-year contract with Palermo to replace outgoing manager Davide Ballardini; the move was seen as a massive surprise due to the Rosanero club being rumoured to be interested in several other managers and the bitter rivalry between them and Catania, the only two Sicilian teams playing in the Italian top flight. He debuted with a 4–2 Coppa Italia win over SPAL 1907, and a 2–1 home win against Napoli in the first week of the Serie A season. However, a number of disappointing results followed, ending in an unimpressive 1–1 home tie to Catania that led Palermo chairman Maurizio Zamparini to remove Zenga from his managerial duties on 23 November, after only thirteen league games in charge of the rosanero.

=== Middle East ===
On 11 May 2010, he was announced new head coach of Saudi Professional League club Al-Nassr. He was removed from his position on 24 December after a string of poor results led Al-Nassr to be overtaken at the top of the league table.

On 6 January 2011, Zenga was appointed new head coach of Al Nasr in the UAE Pro-League.

=== Return to Italy ===
On 4 June 2015, Zenga returned to Italy, and was appointed head coach at Serie A side Sampdoria for the 2015–16 season. However, after he was sacked in November, and replaced by Vincenzo Montella as head coach, he later returned to the Middle East to manage bottom placed club Al-Shaab, however he was unable to turn around the club's fortunes and left the club on 20 February 2016 by mutual consent.

=== Wolverhampton Wanderers ===
On 30 July 2016, Zenga was appointed head coach of Football League Championship side Wolverhampton Wanderers for the 2016–17 season. Despite having never managed in England, he cited his vast foreign experience as enough to succeed. On 2 August, he made his first signings, buying Icelandic striker Jón Daði Böðvarsson from Kaiserslautern and bringing in Portuguese midfielder João Teixeira on a season-long loan from Benfica.

In his first game on 6 August, Zenga's team drew 2–2 away to Rotherham United, coming back from a 2–0 deficit with ten players; he described his first game as an "amazing experience". Zenga took Wolves on a six-game unbeaten run in all competitions, and eight points from his first four league games, including a 3–1 win at local rivals Birmingham City. He praised the Wolves players' spirit and credited them with leading them to the unbeaten start.

Following the end of the summer transfer window, Zenga, having made ten new signings since his appointment, claimed that the Wolves squad was so strong that he could field two different teams if needed. Following a 4–0 loss to Barnsley, Wolves beat promotion favourites Newcastle United, to end their five-game winning run. Zenga claimed his team's subsequent performances showed that the defeat to Barnsley was "an accident". Wolves then went on a five-game winless run, losing four, that would lead to his dismissal.

Despite the insistence of Dave Edwards that Zenga retained the support of the Wolves players, he was dismissed on 25 October following only 4 wins out of the club's first 14 Championship fixtures and Wolves 18th in the table. On 7 April 2017, Wolves director Jeff Shi said: "I liked Walter. He was passionate, a really lovely guy... Later we found out it was not a good match. We had to change very quickly... The only big mistake in my mind was the coach appointment at the beginning of the season."

=== Return to Italy ===
On 8 December 2017, Zenga was appointed Crotone manager. The team was relegated to Serie B at the end of the year.

Zenga returned into management on 11 October 2018 as he was named new head coach of Serie B club Venezia in place of Stefano Vecchi. He was sacked on 5 March 2019, after a run of four losses in five games had the club fighting relegation.

On 3 March 2020, Zenga was appointed new head coach of Serie A club Cagliari, signing a contract until 30 June 2021, with Under-19 coach Max Canzi named as his assistant. His debut for the Sardinian club was delayed due to the coronavirus pandemic and subsequent nationwide lockdown. He won three and drew four of his 13 games in charge as the team finished 14th, and was replaced by Eusebio Di Francesco in August.

On 27 September 2024, Italian Serie D club Siracusa announced the hiring of Zenga as a "club manager" and "brand ambassador", in a non-coaching role within the club.

== Style of management ==
As a manager, Zenga usually uses a four–man back-line with his teams, while he has used several different tactical systems and formations in midfield and attack throughout his career.

== Personal life ==
Zenga has been married three times; he has five children.

=== Marriages and relationships ===
In 1982, young professional footballer Zenga—residing in San Benedetto del Tronto while playing on loan with Serie B side U.S. Sambenedettese—married the local model and 1980 Miss Marche Elvira Carfagna, having first met her at Palazzina Azzurra on the town's waterfront. As Zenga re-joined Inter, the couple moved to Milan. In parallel with his marriage to Carfagna, throughout 1985, Zenga maintained an extramarital affair with television presenter Marina Perzy. In February 1985, already subject of media rumours, the ongoing affair generated public interest that culminated during an international break when Inter goalkeeper Zenga could not be reached to accept a national team call-up for a friendly match as part of Italy's FIFA World Cup preparation. Following Italian Football Federation officials' failure to get a hold of the young goalkeeper through his wife who didn't know where he was, it was discovered that Zenga was on a romantic weekend getaway with his mistress Perzy. The event reportedly even prompted Inter president and owner Ernesto Pellegrini to privately intervene with both Zenga and Perzy. In November 1986, his affair with Perzy behind him, Zenga had a child, son Jacopo, with his wife Carfagna. By late 1987, he became romantically involved with another television personality, 23-year-old Roberta Termali, whom he had been co-hosting a weekly Friday evening program, Forza Italia, with since September 1987 on Odeon TV. The relationship led to Zenga leaving his family and moving in with Termali in January 1988. Decades later, during a February 2021 appearance on Barbara D'Urso's Canale 5 talk-variety show, Carfagna publicly accused Termali of "stealing her husband" and "pretending to be her friend in order to get to [Zenga]".

Two years into Zenga's relationship with Termali, the couple's first child, son Nicolò, was born out-of-wedlock in December 1989. After giving birth, Termali took a break from her ascendant TV career in Italy. In February 1990—as Zenga was preparing for his upcoming FIFA World Cup appearance on home soil as Italy's first-choice goalkeeper, in addition to his daily professional obligations at Inter—Termali turned down a prominent role on Rai Uno's Gran Premio, a 14-episode weekly talent competition that would go on to become a massive television hit in Italy. Extended to her personally by the show's famous host Pippo Baudo, she reportedly declined the offer of being the program's on-location field reporter due to not wanting her and Zenga's son's infancy to be marked by two absent parents hyper-focused on their careers. Zenga and Termali wed in September 1992 in a notable ceremony at Milan's Via Palestra municipal gardens with Zenga's Inter teammate Davide Fontolan as the groom's best man and a prominent guest list that included Milan mayor Giampiero Borghini, Inter head coach Osvaldo Bagnoli, Inter vice-chairman Peppino Prisco, Italy national team manager Azeglio Vicini as well as footballers such as Gianluca Vialli and Ruud Gullit. Their second child, son Andrea, was born in September 1993. The couple divorced in 1997. In subsequent interviews and media appearances, looking back on her time with Zenga at the peak of his career as a professional footballer and the simultaneous decline of her television career, Termali specifically expressed regret over rejecting Baudo's 1990 Gran Premio offer and more generally for prioritizing Zenga's career over her own.

After divorcing Termali, almost 37-year-old veteran professional footballer Zenga entered a relationship with television presenter Hoara Borselli, 16 years his junior. With Zenga winding down his playing career by moving to the recently launched Major League Soccer in the United States, the couple lived in the country as he began transitioning into football coaching. Still unsure as to which line of work he ultimately wanted to pursue after playing professional football, Zenga also took media jobs in Italy, often with his new partner. The couple ended up spending six years together during which they notably co-hosted home shopping programs on privately owned television channels in Italy, selling appliances and consumer goods such as vacuum cleaners and electro-stimulators.

In 2003, while coaching in Romania, Zenga started a relationship with 21-year-old Romanian woman Raluca Rebedea, 21 years his junior, having met her at an airport while waiting to board a flight to Bucharest. In May 2005, the couple married in a civic ceremony in Bucharest followed by a reception at a Lake Floreasca restaurant. Three years later, in June 2008, the couple organized another wedding ceremony while on vacation in Las Vegas; held in a Vegas chapel, Zenga posted the wedding footage on his YouTube channel. On 19 November 2009, Rebedea gave birth to their daughter Samira Valentina. Though the family resided in Dubai, in April 2010, Zenga stated his willingness to take Romanian citizenship, which he reportedly obtained in April 2012. The couple's second child, son Walter Jr., was born in 2012. In October 2020, Zenga made the dissolution of his and Rebedea's 14-year marriage public via a lengthy Instagram post, revealing that the two "hadn't been a couple for some time" and identifying the reasons for the split in "both the distance, created because of [Zenga's] work as a [football] coach, as well as due to [Rebedea's] radical change", adding he had already filed for divorce at the Dubai Court of Appeal before concluding that "the freedom I've always given her has somehow turned against us [as a couple]". Zenga's particular statement about "the freedom he had given to his wife" triggered a reaction by Italian journalist Selvaggia Lucarelli who criticized the former goalkeeper for "considering his wife's freedom a concession". The resulting controversy online in Italy led to Zenga removing the post.

After divorcing Rebedea, Zenga, still living in Dubai, started a relationship with Dubai-based, Romanian-born and Italian-raised Instagram model and influencer Michela Motoc, 30 years his junior. By October 2021, when the relationship became public knowledge via a gossip magazine paparazzo pictorial, the couple had already moved to Milan.

=== Children ===
Zenga's son with Carfagna, Jacopo Zenga, became a professional footballer himself, playing in Serie D after spending time with Inter and Genoa at youth level.

The younger of Zenga's two sons with Termali, Andrea Zenga, also pursued professional football for a few years before turning to modelling and celebrity reality television in Italy. In September 2018, he appeared with his fiancé Alessandra Sgolastra on the first season of Italian Celebrity Temptation Island on Canale 5 as well as on the fifth season of Grande Fratello VIP (Italian Celebrity Big Brother) in December 2020. The Grande Fratello VIP appearance was marked by his opening up about harbouring ill feelings regarding his father Walter's alleged absentee parenting, a claim that received a lot of press in Italy including reaction from the parties involved.

== Career statistics ==
=== Club ===
Appearances and goals by club, season and competition
Club	Season	League			National Cup		Continental		Other^{1}		Total	
Club	Season	Division	Apps	Goals	Apps	Goals	Apps	Goals	Apps	Goals	Apps	Goals
Salernitana (loan)	1978–79	Serie C1	3	0	0	0	–		–		3	0
Savona (loan)	1979–80	Serie C2	23	0	0	0	–		–		23	0
Sambenedettese (loan)	1980–81	Serie C1	33	0	0	0	–		–		33	0
Sambenedettese (loan)	1981–82	Serie B	34	0	4	0	–		–		38	0
Sambenedettese (loan)	Total		67	0	4	0	–		–		71	0
Inter Milan	1982–83	Serie A	0	0	5	0	0	0	–		5	0
Inter Milan	1983–84	Serie A	30	0	5	0	6 (Note: Appearances in UEFA Cup)	0	–		41	0
Inter Milan	1984–85	Serie A	25	0	10	0	8	0	–		43	0
Inter Milan	1985–86	Serie A	30	0	4	0	10	0	–		44	0
Inter Milan	1986–87	Serie A	29	0	9	0	8	0	–		46	0
Inter Milan	1987–88	Serie A	26	0	11	0	6	0	–		43	0
Inter Milan	1988–89	Serie A	33	0	5	0	5	0	–		43	0
Inter Milan	1989–90	Serie A	31	0	4	0	2 (Note: Appearances in European Cup)	0	1 (Note: Appearance in Supercoppa Italiana)	0	38	0
Inter Milan	1990–91	Serie A	32	0	4	0	12	0	–		48	0
Inter Milan	1991–92	Serie A	31	0	6	0	2	0	–		39	0
Inter Milan	1992–93	Serie A	29	0	5	0	–		–		34	0
Inter Milan	1993–94	Serie A	32	0	5	0	12	0	–		49	0
Inter Milan	Total		328	0	73	0	71	0	1	0	473	0
Sampdoria	1994–95	Serie A	34	0	4	0	8 (Note: Appearances in UEFA Cup Winners' Cup)	0	1	0	47	0
Sampdoria	1995–96	Serie A	7	0	0	0	–		–		7	0
Sampdoria	Total		41	0	4	0	8	0	1	0	54	0
Padova	1996–97	Serie B	21	0	1	0	–		–		22	0
New England Revolution	1997	Major League Soccer	22	0	–		–		2 (Note: Appearances in MLS Cup Playoffs)	0	24	0
New England Revolution	1999	Major League Soccer	25	0	–		–		–		25	0
New England Revolution	Total		47	0	–		–		2	0	49	0
Career total			530	0	82	0	79	0	4	0	695	0

=== International ===
Appearances and goals by national team and year
National team	Year	Apps	Goals
Italy	1986	3	0
Italy	1987	10	0
Italy	1988	10	0
Italy	1989	10	0
Italy	1990	14	0
Italy	1991	8	0
Italy	1992	4	0
Total		59	0

== Managerial statistics ==
As of 20 April 2024

Managerial record by team and tenure
Team	Nat	From	To	Record							
Team	Nat	From	To	G	W	D	L	GF	GA	GD	Win %
New England Revolution (Note: During Zenga's tenure as manager, MLS rules did not allow for draws)	(United States)	24 August 1998	30 September 1999	36	13	0	23	71	88	−17	36.11
Brera	(Italy)	31 October 2000	18 January 2001	9	1	4	4	?	?	—	11.11
Naţional București	(Romania)	24 July 2002	10 September 2003	47	20	8	19	67	56	+11	42.55
Steaua București	(Romania)	1 July 2004	20 May 2005	40	21	8	11	57	31	+26	52.50
Red Star Belgrade	(Serbia and Montenegro)	22 July 2005	12 June 2006	43	33	6	4	102	36	+66	76.74
Gaziantepspor	(Turkey)	1 August 2006	3 January 2007	21	8	5	8	28	29	−1	38.10
Al Ain	(United Arab Emirates)	7 January 2007	30 June 2007	15	6	5	4	14	15	−1	40.00
Dinamo București	(Romania)	3 September 2007	24 November 2007	13	6	4	3	21	12	+9	46.15
Catania	(Italy)	1 April 2008	30 June 2009	50	16	10	24	56	64	−8	32.00
Palermo	(Italy)	1 July 2009	23 November 2009	14	5	5	4	21	20	+1	35.71
Al-Nassr	(Saudi Arabia)	11 May 2010	24 December 2010	16	7	8	1	33	19	+14	43.75
Al-Nasr	(United Arab Emirates)	6 January 2011	13 June 2013	94	36	26	32	162	142	+20	38.30
Al Jazira	(United Arab Emirates)	21 October 2013	14 May 2014	35	15	10	10	60	51	+9	42.86
Sampdoria	(Italy)	11 June 2015	10 November 2015	14	5	4	5	21	21	+0	35.71
Al-Shaab	(United Arab Emirates)	1 December 2015	20 February 2016	10	1	1	8	12	31	−19	10.00
Wolverhampton Wanderers	(England)	30 July 2016	25 October 2016	17	6	4	7	20	21	−1	35.29
Crotone	(Italy)	8 December 2017	19 June 2018	23	6	5	12	29	36	−7	26.09
Venezia	(Italy)	12 October 2018	5 March 2019	19	5	7	7	18	22	−4	26.32
Cagliari	(Italy)	3 March 2020	2 August 2020	13	3	4	6	11	16	−5	23.08
Emirates	(United Arab Emirates)	5 January 2024	23 April 2024	7	1	2	4	8	18	−10	14.29
Total				536	214	126	196	811	728	+83	39.93

== Honours ==
=== Player ===
Inter Milan

- Serie A: 1988–89
- Supercoppa Italiana: 1989
- UEFA Cup: 1990–91, 1993–94

Sampdoria

- Supercoppa Italiana runner-up: 1994

Italy U21

- UEFA European Under-21 Championship runner-up: 1986

Italy

- FIFA World Cup third place: 1990
- UEFA European Championship third place: 1988
- Scania 100 Tournament: 1991

Individual

- Guerin d'Oro: 1987
- IFFHS World's Best Goalkeeper: 1989, 1990, 1991
- UEFA Goalkeeper of the Year: 1990
- Pirata d'Oro (Internazionale Player of the Year): 1987
- MLS Player of the Month: 1997
- Midnight Riders Man of the Year Award: 1997
- MLS All-Star: 1997, 1999
- Inter Milan Hall of Fame: 2018

=== Coach ===
Național București

- Cupa României runner-up: 2002–03

Steaua București

- Divizia A: 2004–05

Red Star Belgrade

- Serbia and Montenegro SuperLiga: 2005–06
- Serbia and Montenegro Cup: 2005–06

Al Ain

- UAE President's Cup runner-up: 2006–07

Al Jazira

- UAE League Cup runner-up: 2013–14

=== Orders ===
- 5th Class / Knight: Cavaliere Ordine al Merito della Repubblica Italiana: 1991
