= J. T. Roberts =

American soccer player

J.T. Roberts
Personal information
- Date of birth: January 8, 1975 (age 51)
- Place of birth: United States
- Positions: Midfielder; forward

Youth career
- 1993–1996: Northern Kentucky Norse

Senior career*
Years	Team	Apps	(Gls)
1997–1999	Cincinnati Riverhawks		
2001	Cincinnati Riverhawks	22	(5)

Managerial career
- 2003: Northern Kentucky TC Stars
- * Club domestic league appearances and goals

J.T. Roberts was born on January 8, 1975. He is an American retired soccer player who played professionally in the USISL.

== Youth ==
In 1993, Roberts graduated from Princeton High School. He attended Northern Kentucky University, playing on the men's soccer team from 1993 to 1996. He was a 1996 NCAA Division II Second Team All American and is a member of the NKU Athletic Hall of Fame.

== Professional ==
On February 2, 1997, the New England Revolution selected J.T. in the third round (twenty-sixth overall) of the 1997 MLS College Draft. On March 6, 1997, the Revolution waived Roberts. He then signed with the Cincinnati Riverhawks of the USISL A-League. He played for the Riverhawks through the 1999 season, then again in 2001.

== Administration ==
In 2003, Roberts coached the Northern Kentucky TC Stars during its single season of existence in the W-League. Roberts has served as the general manager of the Cincinnati Kings.
