= Greg Lalas =

American former professional soccer player

Personal information
- Full name: Henry Gregory Lalas
- Date of birth: March 27, 1973 (age 53)
- Place of birth: Birmingham, Michigan, United States
- Height: 6 ft 1 in (1.85 m)
- Position: Defender

Youth career
- 1990: William & Mary Tribe
- 1991–1994: Brown Bears

Senior career*
Years	Team	Apps	(Gls)
1994	FC Avenir Beggen	-	(-)
1996	Tampa Bay Mutiny	3	(0)
1996	→ Tampa Bay Cyclones (loan)		(1)
1997	New England Revolution	2	(0)
1997	→ Worcester Wildfire (loan)	2	(0)
1998	Worcester Wildfire	23	(0)
- * Club domestic league appearances and goals

Henry Gregory Lalas is an American former professional soccer player who played as a defender. Currently, he is the chief marketing officer at United Soccer League.

== Biography ==
Perhaps best known as the brother of Alexi Lalas, he was previously site director of Goal.com, co-host of the twice-weekly internet show ExtraTime Radio on MLSsoccer.com, and the weekly podcast Waiting for Gaetjens. He played two seasons in Major League Soccer and one in the USISL. Lalas was also a columnist for Sports Illustrated Online from 2006 to 2010 and a former color commentator for the New England Revolution.

Lalas attended Brown University, where he played on the men's soccer team from 1991 to 1994. He decided to attend Brown after a conversation he had with his childhood hero, Chris Berman, who graduated from Brown in 1977. He was All-Ivy League in 1991, 1992 and 1993. In 1994, he played for FC Avenir Beggen in the Luxembourg National Division. In February 1996, the Tampa Bay Mutiny selected him in the 16th round (157th overall) in the 1996 MLS Inaugural Player Draft. He came in as a late substitute in three games and was waived at the end of the season. The New England Revolution claimed Lalas off waivers in 1997, but he played only two games before the team granted his request for a release on June 24, 1997. During the season, he spent two games on loan with the Worcester Wildfire in the USISL. His Major League Soccer career was a short one, consisting of only five games played, 100 minutes, one shot on goal, and one foul committed. Following his retirement, he spent the year touring the country on a motorcycle. In 1998, he played a single season for Worcester Wildfire before retiring permanently.
