= Guillermo Jara =

American soccer forward (born 1973)

Personal information
- Date of birth: October 20, 1973 (age 53)
- Place of birth: Sacramento, California, U.S.
- Height: 5 ft 8 in (1.73 m)
- Position: Forward

College career
Years	Team	Apps	(Gls)
1992–1995	San Diego Toreros		

Senior career*
Years	Team	Apps	(Gls)
1996–1998	Los Angeles Galaxy	37	(2)
1996	→ Sacramento Scorpions (loan)		(3)
1998–1999	Tampa Bay Mutiny	25	(0)
1999	→ MLS Pro-40 (loan)	4	(0)
1999	Colorado Rapids	2	(0)
2000	San Diego Flash	23	(5)

International career
1994–1995	United States U23	5	(0)
- * Club domestic league appearances and goals

Guillermo Jara (born October 20, 1973) is an American former soccer forward who played four seasons in Major League Soccer.

== Youth ==
Jara grew up in Sacramento, California, attending Christian Brothers High School where he was a 1991 Parade magazine high school all-American. Jara also played club soccer with the Tri-Valley Soccer Club. He then played four years of college soccer at the University of San Diego from 1992 to 1995. He was the Soccer America magazine Freshman of the Year when he finished second in the US in assists and tied for third in the points list. He holds the university records for both goals and assists with 51 and 48 respectively. In his senior year, he was the 1995 West Coast Conference Player of the Year and a third team all-American.

Jara is one of 22 college players to be part of the 40-40 club, having both 40 goals and 40 assists in their college career.

== U-23 national team ==
Jara earned five caps with the United States U-23 men's national soccer team in 1994 and 1995. However, he never played for the senior national team.

== Professional ==
In February 1996, the Los Angeles Galaxy selected Jara in the first round (7th overall) of the 1996 MLS College Draft. While he played in twenty-one games for the Galaxy in 1996, it was mostly as a late game substitute, amassing only 811 minutes. Consequently, the Galaxy loaned him to the Sacramento Scorpions of the USISL for several games. Jara plated even less in 1997, a total of only 353 minutes. In 1998, he played one game with the Galaxy before being traded to the Tampa Bay Mutiny. The Mutiny also used him sparingly, and in July sent him to the MLS Pro-40 team for four games. Jara began the 1999 season in Tampa Bay, but was traded to the Colorado Rapids on June 14, 1999, in exchange for Steve Trittschuh. Jara played only six minutes with the Rapids before the team released him on November 24, 1999. In 2000, Jara spent the season with the San Diego Flash of the USL A-League.
