= Leonardo Squadrone =

Argentine footballer

Personal information
- Full name: Leonardo Gastón Squadrone
- Date of birth: December 1, 1971 (age 53)
- Place of birth: La Plata, Argentina
- Height: 6 ft 2 in (1.88 m)
- Position(s): Defender

Senior career*
Years	Team	Apps	(Gls)
1992–1995	Estudiantes		
1993–1994	→ Lanús (loan)		
1995–1996	Huracán		
1997	New England Revolution	23	(0)
1997–1998	Cipolletti		
- *Club domestic league appearances and goals

Leonardo Gastón Squadrone (born 1 December 1971 in La Plata) is a retired Argentine association football player.
