= Alejandro Farías =

Argentine footballer

Personal information
- Date of birth: January 27, 1970 (age 55)
- Place of birth: Buenos Aires, Argentina
- Position(s): Midfielder

Senior career*
Years	Team	Apps	(Gls)
-1996	Boca Juniors	20	(1)
1996–1997	Club Atlético Atlanta	9	(0)
1997	New England Revolution	25	(1)
1998–2000	Club Almagro	30	(0)
2000–2002	Club Atlético Nueva Chicago	39	(1)
2002–2003	Defensores de Belgrano	5	(0)
- *Club domestic league appearances and goals

Alejandro Fabian Farías (born 27 January 1970, in Argentina) is an Argentine retired footballer.

== Career ==
Farías started his career with Boca Juniors, one of Argentina's most successful club, leaving due to injury. After that, he played in the American top flight with New England Revolution as well as the Argentine second division with Club Atlético Atlanta, Club Almagro, Club Atlético Nueva Chicago, and Defensores de Belgrano.
