= Beto Naveda =

Argentine footballer

Alberto "Beto" Naveda
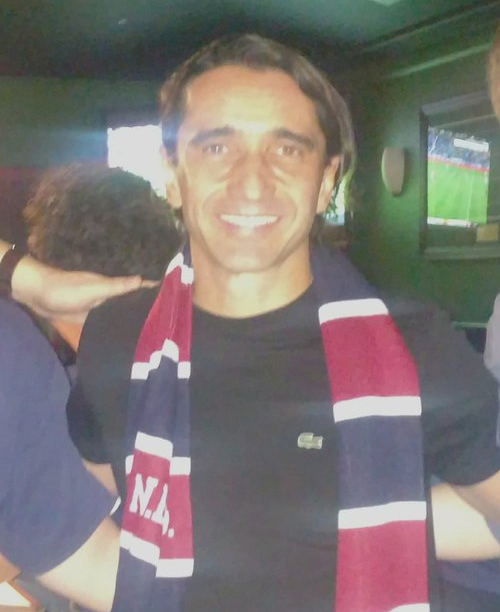

Personal information
- Full name: Alberto Dante Naveda
- Date of birth: 24 May 1972 (age 54)
- Place of birth: San Juan, Argentina
- Height: 1.75 m (5 ft 9 in)
- Position: Midfielder

Senior career*
Years	Team	Apps	(Gls)
1994	Boca Juniors	1	(0)
1995–1996	Quilmes		
1996–1997	New England Revolution	54	(13)
1997–1998	Maccabi Acre	28	(5)
1998–1999	Maccabi Ironi Ashdod	16	(2)
1999–2000	Hapoel Jerusalem	13	(1)
2000–2001	Dundee United	13	(2)
2001–2002	Dundee	2	(0)
2002–2003	U.S. Sanremese		
- * Club domestic league appearances and goals

Alberto "Beto" Dante Naveda (born 24 May 1972 in San Juan, Argentina, is an Argentine former footballer who played as a midfielder. He played professionally in Argentina, Israel, Scotland and the United States.

== Career ==
Naveda started his career with Boca Juniors, where he spent during the year 1994, then was in Quilmes Athletic Club in 1995 and 1996.

=== Major League Soccer ===
After leaving, he moved to the United States, playing for Long Island in the USISL.

The New England Revolution or Major League Soccer selected Naveda with their first-ever supplemental draft pick (sixth overall) in the 1996 MLS Supplemental draft on March 4, 1996.

Naveda spent two seasons with the Revolution, starting 20 matches in 1996 and 28 in 1997. He led the team in assists both years. Naveda made his Revolution debut in the club's first-ever match on April 13, 1996. He scored his first Revolution goal on May 11 in a 3-2 loss to the Columbus Crew, ultimately finishing the Revolution's inaugural season second in scoring, with six goals and seven assists. Naveda was named the Midnight Riders Man of the Year for 1996.

In 1997, Naveda recorded the first hat-trick in New England Revolution history, on May 30 in the Revolution's 3-1 win over the MetroStars. He was subsequently named MLS Player of the Week for week 11. He was the Revolution Scoring Champion for 1997, with seven goals and six assists. His seven goals were tied for first on the team with Imad Baba.

=== Later career ===
Spells in Israel followed, with a year apiece at Maccabi Ironi Ashdod and Hapoel Jerusalem. Naveda then moved to Scotland and joined Scottish Premier League side Dundee United, alongside Charlie Miller. He made thirteen appearances and scored on his debut against Motherwell. After leaving Tannadice and heading back to Israel, Naveda returned to Scottish football to play for United's neighbours, Dundee, but made only two appearances. Naveda's final club was Italian side U.S. Sanremese Calcio for 2002–03 before retiring.
