= Scott Coufal =

American soccer player

Personal information
- Date of birth: August 27, 1974 (age 52)
- Place of birth: Brookfield, Wisconsin, U.S.
- Height: 6 ft 2 in (1.88 m)
- Position: Goalkeeper

College career
| Years | Team | Apps | (Gls) |
| 1993–1996 | Indiana Hoosiers | | |

Senior career*
| Years | Team | Apps | (Gls) |
| 1997 | New England Revolution | 4 | (0) |
| 1997 | → Connecticut Wolves (loan) | 1 | (0) |
| 1998 | Chicago Fire | 1 | (0) |
- * Club domestic league appearances and goals

Scott Coufal is an American retired soccer goalkeeper who spent two seasons in Major League Soccer.

== Youth ==
Coufal graduated from Brookfield East High School where he was a 1991 NSCAA Third Team High School All American and the 1992 Gatorade High School Soccer Player of the Year. Coufal attended the Indiana University, playing on the men's soccer team from 1993 to 1996. He was a 1996 Third Team All American.

== Professional ==
On February 1, 1997, the New England Revolution selected Coufal in the second round (twelfth overall) of the 1997 MLS College Draft. That year, the Carolina Dynamo also drafted Coufal in the first round of the USISL A-League draft. Coufal signed with the Revolution and spent most of the season as backup to Walter Zenga. In June 1997, the Revolution sent Coufal on loan to the Connecticut Wolves of the A-League. When Zenga injured his knee in July, Coufal played three games, each a loss. The Revolution then brought in Jeff Causey and sent Coufal to the bench. The Revolution waived Coufal in March 1998 and he signed with the Chicago Fire on April 1, 1998.
