= Evans Wise =

Trinidad and Tobago footballer (born 1973)

Evans Wise CM
Personal information
- Full name: Evans Wise
- Date of birth: November 23, 1973 (age 52)
- Place of birth: Port of Spain, Trinidad and Tobago
- Height: 1.85 m (6 ft 1 in)
- Position: Midfielder

Youth career
- St. Anthony's College
- Mercer CC

Senior career*
Years	Team	Apps	(Gls)
1994	Culture United	34	(2)
1995–1996	SG Egelsbach	5	(0)
1996–1997	Tampa Bay Mutiny	34	(2)
1997–1998	New England Revolution	21	(1)
1998	→ MLS Pro 40 (loan)	2	(0)
1998–1999	Tampa Bay Mutiny	7	(0)
1999–2001	SSV Ulm	9	(0)
2001–2002	SV Elversberg	44	(1)
2002–2003	Wacker Burghausen	2	(0)
2003–2005	Joe Public		
2005–2007	Waldhof Mannheim	25	(0)
2012	Fredericksburg Hotspur	2	(0)
2013–2014	RVA FC		
Total		182	(6)

International career
1995–2006	Trinidad and Tobago	20	(2)
- * Club domestic league appearances and goals

Evans Wise CM (born November 23, 1973) is a Trinidadian former professional footballer who played as a midfielder.

His first professional club was the Tampa Bay Mutiny, who drafted him fourth overall in the 1996 MLS Supplemental Draft.

Wise has 18 caps and three goals for the Trinidad and Tobago national football team. He was called up to for the 2006 FIFA World Cup in Germany, replacing the injured Silvio Spann.

As a member of the squad that competed at the World Cup, Wise was awarded the Chaconia Medal (Gold Class), the second highest state decoration of Trinidad and Tobago.
