= Sam George (soccer) =

American soccer player

Personal information
- Full name: Samuel George
- Date of birth: June 29, 1970 (age 56)
- Place of birth: Mission Viejo, California, U.S.
- Height: 6 ft 0 in (1.83 m)
- Position: Midfielder

Youth career
- 1988–1991: UCLA

Senior career*
Years	Team	Apps	(Gls)
1988–1989	Los Angeles Heat		
1993	Los Angeles United (indoor)		
1994–1996	→ Anaheim Splash (indoor)	59	(38)
1997	New England Revolution	15	(1)
1997	→ Worcester Wildfire (loan)	1	(0)
1997–1999	Tampa Bay Mutiny	45	(3)
1999–2000	Chicago Fire	26	(0)
- * Club domestic league appearances and goals

Sam George (born June 29, 1970) is an American retired soccer midfielder who played two seasons in the Western Soccer Alliance, three in the Continental Indoor Soccer League and four in Major League Soccer.

== Youth ==
George grew up playing soccer with the North Huntington Beach Futbol Club. In 1988, he entered UCLA where he played on the Bruins soccer team from 1988 to 1991. In 1990, the Bruins won the NCAA Men's Soccer Championship.

== Professional ==
In 1988, George joined the Los Angeles Heat of the Western Soccer Alliance before entering UCLA. He played for the Heat again 1989 during the collegiate off season. Following his graduation from UCLA in 1992, there is a one-year gap in George's career records. In 1993, the expansion Los Angeles United of the Continental Indoor Soccer League (CISL) drafted George in the first round of the CISL Amateur Draft. In 1994, new ownership moved United to Anaheim, California and renamed the team the Anaheim Splash. George played through the 1996 season with the Splash. In New England Revolution of Major League Soccer selected George in the third round (22nd overall) of the Supplemental Draft. He played fifteen games with the Revolution and was loaned to the Worcester Wildfire of USISL. On August 13, 1997, the Revolution traded George to the Tampa Bay Mutiny and he played seven games with the Mutiny. He remained with Tampa Bay until August 2, 1999, when he was traded, along with Paul Dougherty and a draft pick to the Chicago Fire for Ritchie Kotschau and Manny Lagos. He finished the 1999 season in Chicago, then played sixteen games in 2000. He announced his retirement from playing on November 3, 2000.

== Post-playing career ==
Since retiring, George worked at the Newport Printing Service Company in Irvine, California and has coached youth soccer.
