= Tampa Bay Mutiny =

- Full name: Tampa Bay Mutiny
- Nickname: Mutiny
- Founded: November 16, 1994; 31 years ago
- Dissolved: January 8, 2002; 24 years ago
- Stadium: Tampa Stadium; Raymond James Stadium
- Capacity: 74,301; 65,857
- League: Major League Soccer
Home colors	Away colors	Third colors

The Tampa Bay Mutiny were an American professional soccer team based in Tampa, Florida. The club competed in Major League Soccer (MLS) as a member of the Eastern Conference. The Mutiny were a charter member of MLS, playing from 1996 to 2001. The team played its home games at Tampa Stadium and then at Raymond James Stadium.

The Mutiny were established in 1994 and were owned and operated by MLS throughout its entire existence. The team was successful in their first years of play, winning the first MLS Supporters' Shield behind MLS MVP Carlos Valderrama and high-scoring forward Roy Lassiter, whose 27 goals in 1996 remained the MLS single-season record until 2018. However, in subsequent years, dropping attendance and revenues became problems, especially as the team's on-field success declined and the lease at its second home field of Raymond James Stadium removed sources of gameday revenues. Owing to these issues, MLS attempted without success to find a local ownership group to take over operations from the league, and both the Mutiny and the league's other Florida-based team, the Miami Fusion, were folded before the 2002 season.

== History ==
In 1994, newly established Major League Soccer announced it would place one of its charter franchises in the Tampa Bay Area. The region was seen as a potentially fertile market for soccer due to the success of the Tampa Bay Rowdies in the old North American Soccer League in the 1970s and 1980s. The Mutiny took the field in 1996 when MLS began play. While the Mutiny had no direct connection to the Rowdies franchise, the Mutiny occasionally paid tribute to its predecessor by wearing green and gold alternative kits, once wearing both the Mutiny and Rowdies logos on the same shirt.

The Mutiny were owned and operated by MLS along with two other teams, the Dallas Burn and the San Jose Clash, with the league hoping eventually sell the franchises to private local owners. The team managed strong signings in 1995, including Carlos Valderrama, Roy Lassiter, and Martín Vásquez. They were successful in their first two years, particularly in 1996, when they won the first Supporters' Shield with the best regular-season finish behind Most Valuable Player Carlos Valderrama and Golden Boot winner Roy Lassiter.

On April 13, 1996, the Mutiny played their inaugural game against the New England Revolution, winning 3–2. Led by manager Thomas Rongen and Roy Lassiter, who scored a record 27 goals in the season, the Mutiny claimed the best record in the league at 20–12 and were the first winners (retroactively) of the Supporters' Shield. In the playoffs, they beat the Columbus Crew before losing in the conference final to eventual champions D.C. United.

In 1997, Thomas Rongen took over the New England Revolution, and was replaced by John Kowalski. Under him, the Mutiny finished the season with a record of 17–15, but were swept in the playoffs by the Columbus Crew. After the season, Kowalski resigned from the club. 1998 saw Tim Hankinson join the club as the new manager while star player Carlos Valderrama joined new MLS side Miami Fusion. As a result, the Mutiny would struggle through the season, finishing with a record of 12–20, missing the playoffs for the first time.

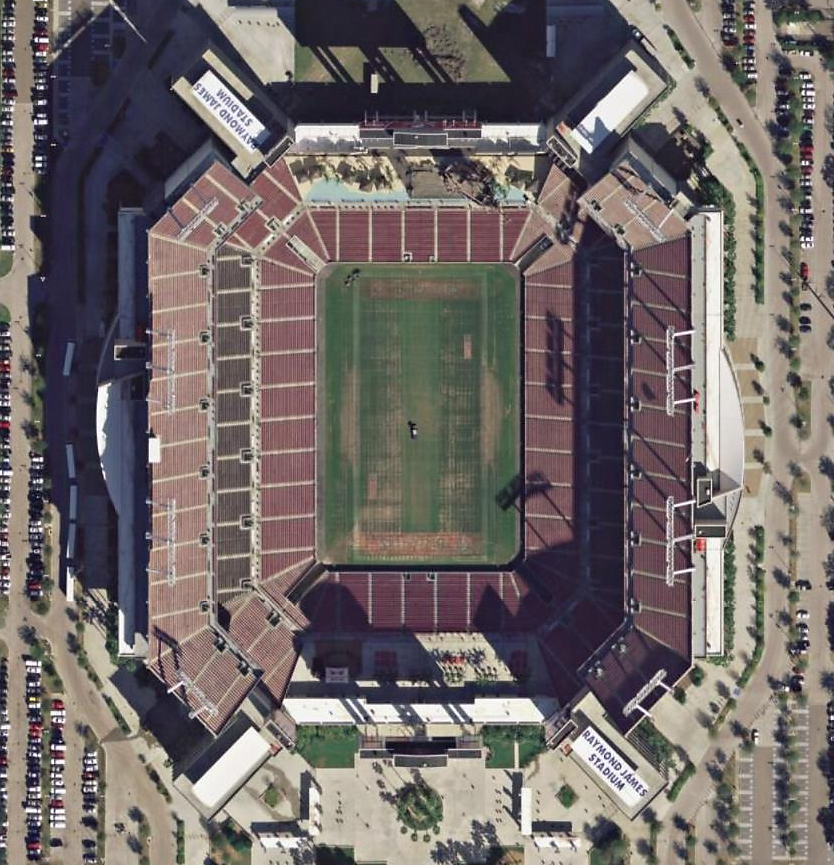
Raymond James Stadium was home to the Mutiny from 1999 to 2001.

In 1999, the Mutiny reacquired Valderrama. Despite this, they struggled, being swept by the Columbus Crew in the first round of the playoffs, which they qualified for despite having a losing record. In the 2000 season, the Mutiny finished with a 16–12–4 record after rebounding from a poor start to the campaign. However, they were swept by the Los Angeles Galaxy in the first round of the playoffs. In 2001, Tim Hankinson was fired, but struggles continued with successors Alfonso Mondelo and Perry Van der Beck. Mondelo was fired midseason, and neither manager could revive the struggling franchise. On September 4, the Mutiny lost 2–1 to the Columbus Crew in what would be their last ever match. They managed just four wins and two draws, recording 21 losses over the course of the campaign.

The city of Tampa demolished Tampa Stadium in 1998, and the Mutiny moved to new Raymond James Stadium for the 1999 season with a much less favorable lease. The club was hampered by declining attendance and low revenues which were exacerbated by a lease agreement that transferred most match day revenue to the Tampa Bay Buccaneers, resulting in an inability to secure a local ownership group. In 2001, the Mutiny had the worst record in MLS with only four wins in twenty-seven matches on the season and drew an average attendance of under 11,000 per game, among the league's lowest. Faced with financial losses up to $2 million a year, MLS courted Malcolm Glazer and his family, owners of the Tampa Bay Buccaneers National Football League team, to purchase the Mutiny. The Glazers considered the deal but ultimately declined, leaving the league with no prospective owners willing to take over the team. MLS folded the Mutiny, as well as its other Florida-based team, the Miami Fusion, in 2002. The Glazers would purchase Manchester United in 2005.

While Major League Soccer has not had a team in the Tampa Bay area since the folding of the Mutiny, a preseason game on February 14, 2025, between the two current Florida teams Orlando City SC and Inter Miami CF at Raymond James Stadium was the first MLS game in the area since 2001.

=== United Premier Soccer League ===
In August 2025, the UPSL on their official Facebook page, announced a team joining the league. The team is named after the charter club in MLS, to compete in the Florida West Conference, starting in their upcoming fall 2025 season.

== Honors ==
=== Team ===
- MLS Supporters' Shield:

1996

- Eastern Conference (Regular Season Winners):

1996

- Copa de Puerto Rico

2000

=== Players ===
- MLS Most Valuable Player:

1996 Carlos Valderrama

- MLS Rookie of the Year Award: (2)

1996 Steve Ralston
1997 Mike Duhaney

- MLS Golden Boot: (2)

1996 Roy Lassiter (27g, 4a)
2000 Mamadou Diallo (26g, 4a)

- MLS Fair Play Award: (2)

1999 Steve Ralston
2000 Steve Ralston

- MLS Best XI selections (7)

1996 Carlos Valderrama, Roy Lassiter
1997 Carlos Valderrama
1999 Steve Ralston
2000 Carlos Valderrama, Steve Ralston, Mamadou Diallo

- MLS All-Star Game MVP: (3)

1996 Carlos Valderrama
1997 Carlos Valderrama
2000 Mamadou Diallo

- MLS All-Star Game starters: (10)

1996 Carlos Valderrama, Roy Lassiter, Martín Vásquez, Cle Kooiman
1997 Carlos Valderrama
1998 Frankie Hejduk, Jan Eriksson
1999 Carlos Valderrama
2000 Carlos Valderrama, Steve Ralston

- MLS All-Star Game reserves: (10)

1996 Mark Dougherty, Steve Pittman
1997 Giuseppe Galderisi, Steve Ralston, Frank Yallop
1998 Thomas Ravelli, Mauricio Ramos
2000 Mamadou Diallo, Scott Garlick
2001 Mamadou Diallo

- MLS records:

26 assists in one season: Carlos Valderrama in 2000
MLS All-Star Game MVP: Carlos Valderrama in 1996 & 1997

- Canadian Soccer Hall of Fame:

2004 Frank Yallop

=== Coach and administration ===
- MLS Coach of the Year Award:

1996 Thomas Rongen

- MLS Executive of the Year Award:

1999 Nick Sakiewicz

- MLS Operations Executive of the Year Award: (2)

1996 Eddie Austin
2001 Eddie Austin

== Head coaches ==
- (Netherlands) Thomas Rongen (1996)
- (United States) John Kowalski (1997–98)
- (United States) Tim Hankinson (1998–00)
- (Spain) Alfonso Mondelo (2001)
- (United States) Perry Van der Beck (2001)

== Team records ==
- Games: (United States) Steve Ralston (177)
- Goals: (United States) Roy Lassiter (37)
- Assists: (Colombia) Carlos Valderrama (81)
- Shutouts: (United States) Scott Garlick (11)

== Home stadiums ==
- Tampa Stadium (1996–1998)
- Raymond James Stadium (1999–2001)

== See also ==
- Tampa Bay Rowdies of the USL Championship
- Fort Lauderdale–Tampa Bay rivalry
