= 1997 Columbus Crew season =

Columbus Crew
1997 season
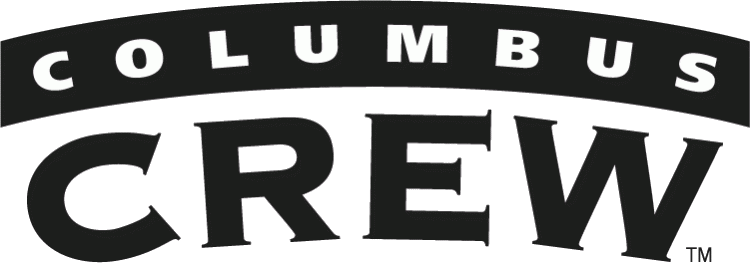
- Investor-operators: Lamar Hunt; Clark Hunt; Dan Hunt; Lamar Hunt Jr. Sharron Hunt Munson; Ron Pizzuti and a group of local investors
- Head Coach: Tom Fitzgerald
- Stadium: Ohio Stadium
- Major League Soccer: Conference: 3rd Overall: 6th
- MLS Cup playoffs: Conference finals
- Top goalscorer: League: Pete Marino (8); All: Pete Marino (8)
- Highest home attendance: 22,259 (9/28 v. TB)
- Lowest home attendance: 9,506 (10/15 v. DC)
- Average home league attendance: 14,625 (58.2%)
- Biggest win: CLB 4–0 KC (9/14)
- Biggest defeat: DAL 3–0 CLB (7/13)
Home colors	Away colors

The 1997 Columbus Crew season was the club's second season of existence and their second consecutive season in Major League Soccer, the top flight of soccer in the United States. The first match of the season was on March 29 against Colorado Rapids. It was the second season under head coach Tom Fitzgerald who was made permanent manager in the offseason.

== Roster ==
As of October 9, 1997

Note: Flags indicate national team as defined under FIFA eligibility rules; some limited exceptions apply. Players may hold more than one non-FIFA nationality.

No.	Pos.	Nation	Player
1	GK	USA	Brad Friedel
2	DF	TTO	Ancil Elcock
3	DF	USA	Mike Clark
4	DF	USA	Janusz Michallik
5	DF	USA	Thomas Dooley
6	MF	USA	Todd Yeagley
7	MF	USA	Jorge Salcedo
8	MF	USA	A. J. Wood
9	FW	USA	Billy Thompson
10	MF	USA	Brian Maisonneuve
11	DF	USA	Mike Lapper

No.	Pos.	Nation	Player
12	FW	USA	Pete Marino
13	MF	USA	Jason Farrell
15	MF	RSA	Doctor Khumalo
16	MF	USA	Rob Smith
18	GK	USA	David Winner
19	MF	POL	Robert Warzycha
20	FW	USA	Brian McBride
22	FW	ARG	Marcelo Carrera (captain)
24	DF	ARG	Sergio Miguez
25	DF	USA	Ubusuku Abukusumo
26	GK	USA	Dusty Hudock (on loan Seattle Sounders)

== Technical Staff ==
Position	Staff
General Manager	(United States) Jamey Rootes
Head Coach	(United States) Tom Fitzgerald
Assistant Coach	(United States) John Ellinger
Assistant Coach	(Argentina) Oscar Pisano until September 30
Assistant Coach	(United States) Greg Andrulis
Head Trainer	(United States) Amy Baer

== Non-competitive ==
=== Preseason ===
Preason for the Columbus Crew began on February 15 at the Woody Hayes Athletic Center. The Crew then trained in Pensacola, FL from February 20 through March March 5. They then trained in Orlando, FL from March 5 through March 12.

The Columbus Crew brought some non-roster invitees to camp. For the leg in Pensacola, FL they brought two Brazilian players. For the leg in Orlando, FL they brought former Crew goalkeeper Bo Oshoniyi, three players from Argentina, two players from Trinidad & Tobago and former Kansas City Wizards goalkeeper Garth Lagerway.

February 21 Friendly	Columbus Crew	0-3	Viborg FF	Pensacola, FL
8:00 PM EST			Sommer,	Stadium: Pensacola Soccer Complex

February 28 Friendly	Columbus Crew	2-0	New England Revolution	Pensacola, FL
7:00 PM EST	Pete Marino 27' (pen.), 50'	Report		Stadium: Pensacola Soccer Complex; Attendance: 350

March 1 Friendly	Columbus Crew	1-4	Dallas Burn	Pensacola, FL
8:00 PM EST	Deneault 70'		Hattrup; Eck; Jones; Suarez	Stadium: Pensacola Soccer Complex

March 6 Friendly	UCF Knights	v	Columbus Crew

March 7 Friendly	Columbus Crew	1-1	Tampa Bay Mutiny	Tampa, FL
7:30 PM EST	McBride 36' (pen.)	Report	Lassiter 3'	Stadium: Pepin-Rood Stadium

March 9 Friendly	Columbus Crew	2-1	Tampa Bay Mutiny	Clearwater, FL
3:00 PM EST	Maisonneuve 15', 22'	Report	Ferruzzi 70'	Stadium: Eddie C. Moore Complex

March 15 Friendly	Richmond Kickers	3-1	Columbus Crew	Richmond, VA
2:00 PM EST	Goal	Report	Todd Yeagley	Stadium: City Stadium

March 18 Dayton Cup	Columbus Crew	0-1	Kansas City Wizards	Washington Township, OH
7:00 PM EST		Report	Johnston 89'	Stadium: Centerville Soccer Stadium; Attendance: 4,000

March 22 Friendly	Kansas City Wizards	2-2 (2-3 SO)	Columbus Crew	St. Louis, MO
3:00 PM EST	Wright 10'; Udeh 56'	Report	Warzycha 26'; Marino 74' (pen.)	Stadium: Anheuser-Busch Sports and Conference Centre; Attendance: 4,000
	Shootout
	Chung (penalty scored); Preki (penalty missed); Tinsley (penalty missed); McKeon (penalty missed); Klopas (penalty scored); Dancy (penalty missed); Udeh (penalty missed); Saunders (penalty scored); Sebwe (penalty missed)		(penalty scored) Marino; (penalty missed) McBride; (penalty missed) Salcedo; (penalty scored) Warzycha; (penalty missed) Clark; (penalty missed) Yeagley; (penalty missed) Deneault; (penalty scored) Khumalo; (penalty scored) Elcock

=== Midseason ===
April 9 Friendly	Ohio State Buckeyes	0-4	Columbus Crew	Columbus, OH
		Report	Rudman, McBride; Smith	Stadium: Ohio State University

May 14 Friendly	Columbus Crew	2-1	Leeds United A.F.C.	Columbus, OH
7:30 PM EDT	Rudman (yellow card) 34'; Warzycha 37'; Carrera 44'	Report	Molenaar (yellow card) 35'; Lilley (yellow card) 61'; Dorigo (yellow card) 63'; Wetherall 89'	Stadium: Ohio Stadium; Attendance: 10,610; Referee: Esse Baharmast

June 27 Friendly	Columbus Crew	2-3	U.S. U-23 National Team	Solon, OH
8:00 PM EDT				Stadium: Stewart Field

July 6 Friendly	Milwaukee Rampage	2-4	Columbus Crew	Milwaukee, Wisconsin
	Sweeney 47'; Roy 70'	Report	Bliss 29'; Salcedo 52'; Dooley 55'; Yeagley 79'	Stadium: Uihlein Soccer Park; Attendance: 5,123; Referee: Ted Covaciu

== Competitive ==
=== Overview ===
Competition	First match	Last match	Starting round	Final position	Record							
Competition	First match	Last match	Starting round	Final position	Pld	W	D	L	GF	GA	GD	Win %
Major League Soccer	March 29, 1997	September 28, 1997	Matchday 1	6th	32	12	17	3	42	41	+1	37.50
MLS Cup Playoffs	October 2, 1997	October 15, 1997	Conference Semifinals	Conference Finals	4	2	0	2	6	5	+1	50.00
Total					36	14	17	5	48	46	+2	38.89

Source: Competitions

=== MLS ===
==== Standings ====
===== Eastern Conference =====
Pos	Team	Pld	W	SOW	L	GF	GA	GD	Pts	Qualification
1	D.C. United	32	17	4	11	70	53	+17	55	Qualification for the conference semifinals
2	Tampa Bay Mutiny	32	14	3	15	55	60	−5	45	Qualification for the conference semifinals
3	Columbus Crew	32	12	3	17	42	41	+1	39	Qualification for the conference semifinals
4	New England Revolution	32	11	4	17	40	53	−13	37	Qualification for the conference semifinals
5	NY/NJ MetroStars	32	11	2	19	43	53	−10	35	

Source: MLS

===== Overall table =====
Pos	Team	Pld	W	SOW	L	GF	GA	GD	Pts	
4	Los Angeles Galaxy	32	14	2	16	55	44	+11	44	
5	Dallas Burn	32	13	3	16	55	49	+6	42	
6	Columbus Crew	32	12	3	17	42	41	+1	39	
7	Colorado Rapids	32	12	2	18	50	59	−9	38	Qualification for the CONCACAF Champions' Cup
8	New England Revolution	32	11	4	17	40	53	−13	37	

Source: MLS
Rules for classification: 1) points; 2) head-to-head record; 3) goal difference; 4) number of goals scored

==== Results summary ====
Overall								Home						Away					
Pld	Pts	W	L	T	GF	GA	GD	W	L	T	GF	GA	GD	W	L	T	GF	GA	GD
32	39	12	17	3	42	41	+1	8	5	3	25	15	+10	4	12	0	17	26	−9

Source: MLS standings
Pld = Matches played; Pts = Points; W = Matches won; T = Matches tied; L = Matches lost; GF = Goals for; GA = Goals against; GD = Goal difference

==== Results by round ====
Round	1	2	3	4	5	6	7	8	9	10	11	12	13	14	15	16	17	18	19	20	21	22	23	24	25	26	27	28	29	30	31	32
Stadium	H	A	H	H	A	A	A	H	A	A	A	H	A	H	H	H	H	H	A	H	A	A	A	H	H	H	A	A	H	A	A	H
Result	SW	L	W	SW	L	W	W	W	L	L	L	L	L	L	W	L	L	W	L	L	L	W	L	W	W	W	L	L	W	L	W	SW

Source: schedule
A = Away; H = Home; W = Win; L = Loss; SW = Shootout Win

==== Match results ====
March 29 1	Columbus Crew	1-1 (3-2 SO)	Colorado Rapids	Columbus, OH
8:00 PM EST	McBride (yellow card) 77'; Marino 79'	Report	Trittschuh 39'	Stadium: Ohio Stadium; Attendance: 14,485; Referee: Brian Hall; Assistant referees: Michael Kennedy; Chip Reed; Fourth official: Roberto Van de Wyngard
	Shootout
	Marino (penalty scored); Carrera (penalty scored); Maisonneuve (penalty missed); Warzycha (penalty missed); McBride (penalty missed); Clark (penalty scored)		(penalty scored) Paz; (penalty missed) Henderson; (penalty missed) Bravo; (penalty missed) Vermes; (penalty scored) Wegerle; (penalty missed) Bartlett

April 5 2	Colorado Rapids	2-0	Columbus Crew	Denver, CO
4:00 PM EDT	Wegerle 24' (pen.); Trittschuh (yellow card) 58'; Harris 59'; Paz (yellow card) 77'	Report	Brian McBride (yellow card) 88'	Stadium: Mile High Stadium; Attendance: 15,325; Referee: Joshua Patlak; Assistant referees: Frank Gorog; Reggie Rutty; Fourth official: Scott McCaslin

April 13 3	Columbus Crew	2-1	Dallas Burn	Columbus, OH
3:00 PM EDT	McBride 6', 75' (pen.)	Report	Rodríguez 53'; Santel (yellow card) 55'; Soehn (yellow card) 62'	Stadium: Ohio Stadium; Attendance: 10,662; Referee: Kevin Terry; Assistant referees: Roberto Van de Wyngard; Richard Eddy; Fourth official: Patrick Ruetschle

April 19 4	Columbus Crew	1-1 (2-1 SO)	San Jose Clash	Columbus, OH
7:30 PM EDT	Marino 2'; Khumalo (yellow card) 52'	Report	Baicher 50'; Urbányi (yellow card) 61'	Stadium: Ohio Stadium; Attendance: 18,358; Referee: Ali Saheli; Assistant referees: Paul Scott; Brian Darling; Fourth official: Hugh Cullin
	Shootout
	Marino (penalty scored); Warzycha (penalty missed); Maisonneuve (penalty missed); Clark (penalty missed); Yeagley (penalty scored)		(penalty scored) Medved; (penalty missed) Lewis; (penalty missed) Cerritos; (penalty missed) Lozzano; (penalty missed) Iroha

April 26 5	NY/NJ MetroStars	2-1	Columbus Crew	East Rutherford, NJ
7:00 PM EDT	Wood 6'; Guido (yellow card) 13'; Sorber 17'	Report	McBride 5'; Rudman (yellow card) 80'; Jachym (yellow card) 85'	Stadium: Giants Stadium; Attendance: 18,107; Referee: Raul Dominguez; Assistant referees: Alex Prus; John Konstantinidis; Fourth official: Noel Kenny

May 3 6	San Jose Clash	1-3	Columbus Crew	San Jose, CA
10:30 PM EDT	Martin (yellow card) 27'; Doyle (yellow card) 40'; Medved 73'	Report	Bliss (yellow card) 23', (goal) 35'; Khumalo 56'; McBride 71'; Salcedo (yellow card) 75'	Stadium: Spartan Stadium; Attendance: 14,295; Referee: Esse Baharmast; Assistant referees: Reggie Rutty; Alex Del Angel; Fourth official: David Bragg

May 9 7	New England Revolution	0-2	Columbus Crew	Foxborough, MA
7:30 PM EDT	Moore (yellow card) 68'	Report	Carrera 6'; McBride (yellow card) 59'; Salcedo 68'	Stadium: Foxboro Stadium; Attendance: 13,168; Referee: John Weselak; Assistant referees: Alex Prus; Mark Oliver; Fourth official: Erich Simmons

May 11 8	Columbus Crew	3-0	NY/NJ MetroStars	Columbus, OH
3:00 PM EDT	Friedel (yellow card) 22'; Khumalo 29'; Carrera 49'; Maisonneuve 87' (pen.)	Report	Savarese (yellow card) 7'; Zaun (yellow card) 22'; Meola (yellow card) 22'; Guido (yellow card) 56'	Stadium: Ohio Stadium; Attendance: 14,701; Referee: Ted Covaciu; Assistant referees: Michael Kennedy; Jamil Hamdan; Fourth official: Hugh Cullin

May 17 9	Colorado Rapids	1-1 (2-1 SO)	Columbus Crew	Denver, CO
9:00 PM EDT	Trittschuh (yellow card) 5'; Bartlett 88'	Report	Maisonneuve (yellow card) 5'; Warzycha (yellow card) 37'; Marino 74'	Stadium: Mile High Stadium; Attendance: 10,054; Referee: Noel Kenny; Assistant referees: Steve Olson; Rudy Bettman; Fourth official: Jose Corro
	Shootout
	Patiño (penalty missed); Henderson (penalty scored); Harris (penalty missed); Bravo (penalty missed); Bartlett (penalty scored)		(penalty missed) Marino; (penalty missed) Carrera; (penalty scored) Salcedo; (penalty missed) Clark; (penalty missed) Yeagley

May 22 10	Kansas City Wizards	3-1	Columbus Crew	Kansas City, MO
8:30 PM EDT	Klopas (yellow card) 8'; McKeon 22', 27'; Chung 75'	Report	Yeagley 85'	Stadium: Arrowhead Stadium; Attendance: 8,151; Referee: Rich Grady; Assistant referees: Richard Huber; Thomas Smith; Fourth official: Jorge Riopedre

May 25 11	Los Angeles Galaxy	1-0	Columbus Crew	Pasadena, CA
10:30 PM EDT	Calichman (yellow card) 75'; Jones 81'	Report		Stadium: Rose Bowl; Attendance: 13,186; Referee: Arturo Angeles; Assistant referees: Michael Kennedy; Bryan Elliott; Fourth official: Theodore Bennett

May 29 12	Columbus Crew	2-3	D.C. United	Columbus, OH
7:30 PM EDT	Farrell 6'; Marino 75'	Report	Harkes 9'; Moreno 17' (pen.); Maessner 81'	Stadium: Ohio Stadium; Attendance: 12,299; Referee: John Weselak; Assistant referees: Alex Prus; Tarek Khan; Fourth official: Douglas Palomaki

June 7 13	Tampa Bay Mutiny	3-1	Columbus Crew	Tampa, FL
7:30 PM EDT	Galderisi 17'; Prampin 56'; Wise (yellow card) 81', (goal) 86'	Report	Yeagley (yellow card) 43' (red card) 71'; Carrera 52'; Warzycha (yellow card) 88'	Stadium: Houlihan's Stadium; Attendance: 10,152; Referee: Ali Saheli; Assistant referees: Paul Scott; Robbie Mann; Fourth official: Roger Itaya

June 15 14	Columbus Crew	0-2	Colorado Rapids	Columbus, OH
5:00 PM EDT	Maisonneuve (yellow card) 59'	Report	Henderson (yellow card) 37'; Bravo 41'; Trittschuh (yellow card) 83'; Wegerle (yellow card) 85', (goal) 89'	Stadium: Ohio Stadium; Attendance: 12,694; Referee: Tim Weyland; Assistant referees: Craig Lowry; Kermit Quisenberry; Fourth official: Patrick Ruetschle

June 21 15	NY/NJ MetroStars	2-1	Columbus Crew	Columbus, OH
7:30 PM EDT	Warzycha (yellow card) 67'; Dooley 71'; McBride 86' (pen.)	Report	de Ávila (yellow card) 41'; Sorber 62'	Stadium: Ohio Stadium; Attendance: 17, 190; Referee: John Weselak; Assistant referees: Robert Sheker; Brian Darling; Fourth official: Mikael Lundqvist

July 4 16	Columbus Crew	1-2	Kansas City Wizards	Columbus, OH
7:30 PM EDT	Smith (yellow card) 36'; Marino 75'; Friedel (red card) 89'	Report	Takawira 37', 70'; Pittman (yellow card) 38'; Gough (yellow card) 75'; Johnston (yellow card) 82'; Ammann (red card) 87'	Stadium: Ohio Stadium; Attendance: 16,713; Referee: Kevin Terry; Assistant referees: Roberto Van de Wyngard; Jamil Hamdan (AR2)

July 13 17	Columbus Crew	1-2	Dallas Burn	Columbus, OH
3:00 PM EDT	McBride 17'	Report	Dodd (yellow card) 8'; Eck (yellow card) 18' (red card) 71'; Webber 20'; Flores 45'	Stadium: Ohio Stadium; Attendance: 12,329; Referee: Robert Sheker; Assistant referees: Paul Tamberino; Tarek Khan; Fourth official: Mikael Lundqvist

July 20 18	Columbus Crew	1-0	New England Revolution	Columbus, OH
3:00 PM EDT	Warzycha 55'	Report	Baba (yellow card) 73'; Squadrone (yellow card) 84'	Stadium: Ohio Stadium; Attendance: 14,248; Referee: Raul Dominguez; Assistant referees: Richard Eddy; Kermit Quisenberry; Fourth official: Patrick Ruetschle

July 25 19	D.C. United	1-1 (3-1 SO)	Columbus Crew	Washington, D.C.
7:30 PM EDT	Williams (yellow card) 18'; Etcheverry 89'	Report	Marino 76'; Clark (yellow card) 78'	Stadium: Robert F. Kennedy Memorial Stadium; Attendance: 18,140; Referee: Ali Saheli; Assistant referees: Edwin Resendes; Lorenzo Sanz; Fourth official: Steve Taylor
	Shootout
	Wegerle (penalty scored); Kelderman (penalty scored); Etcheverry (penalty scored)		(penalty scored) Marino; (penalty missed) Maisonneuve; (penalty missed) Yeagley; (penalty missed) Clark

July 27 20	Columbus Crew	0-0 (1-3 SO)	Tampa Bay Mutiny	Columbus, OH
3:00 PM EDT	Lapper (yellow card) 44'	Report	Hejduk (yellow card) 57'	Stadium: Ohio Stadium; Attendance: 12,340; Referee: Tim Weyland; Assistant referees: John Weselak; Brian Darling (AR2)
	Shootout
	Marino (penalty scored); Elcock (penalty missed); Clark (penalty missed); Wood (penalty missed)		(penalty missed) Vargas; (penalty missed) Vásquez; (penalty scored) Ralston; (penalty scored) Yallop; (penalty scored) Lassiter

July 30 21	D.C. United	4-2	Columbus Crew	Washington, D.C.
7:30 PM EDT	Arce 39' (pen.), 90'; Moreno 43', 62' (pen.), (yellow card) 85'	Report	Wood 4'; Miguez (yellow card) 45'; Clark (yellow card) 58'; Marino 73'	Stadium: Robert F. Kennedy Memorial Stadium; Attendance: 11,504; Referee: Rich Grady; Assistant referees: Chip Reed; Thomas Perry; Fourth official: Daniel Stead
Note: Originally scheduled for June 28.

August 2 22	Los Angeles Galaxy	1-2	Columbus Crew	Pasadena, CA
10:30 PM EDT	Hurtado 4'; Caligiuri (yellow card) 30'; Fraser (yellow card) 68'; Pena (yellow card) 81'	Report	Lapper 71', (yellow card) 85'; Thompson 90'	Stadium: Rose Bowl; Attendance: 24,344; Referee: Tim Weyland; Assistant referees: Tom Bobadilla; Frank Gorog; Fourth official: Theodore Bennett

August 9 23	San Jose Clash	1-1 (4-3 SO)	Columbus Crew	San Jose, CA
10:30 PM EDT	Lozzano 70'; Draguicevich (yellow card) 72'	Report	Salcedo (yellow card) 15'; Marino (yellow card) 20'; Dooley 45'; Clark (yellow card) 57'	Stadium: Spartan Stadium; Attendance: 11,799; Referee: Noel Kenny; Assistant referees: Chris Nuezil; Alex Del Angel; Fourth official: Cory Dean
	Shootout
	Baicher (penalty scored); Lewis (penalty missed); Kinnear (penalty missed); Lozzano (penalty scored); Medved (penalty scored); Urbányi (penalty scored)		(penalty scored) Marino; (penalty scored) Salcedo; (penalty scored) Thompson; (penalty missed) Dooley; (penalty missed) Elcock; (penalty missed) Farrell

August 16 24	Columbus Crew	2-0	D.C. United	Columbus, OH
7:30 PM EDT	Elcock (yellow card) 18'; Dooley 68'; Marino 72'	Report	Llamosa (yellow card) 42'; Harkes (yellow card) 90'	Stadium: Ohio Stadium; Attendance: 15,355; Referee: Joshua Patlak; Assistant referees: Laszlo Nagy; Jamil Hamdan; Fourth official: Douglas Palomaki

August 23 25	Columbus Crew	2-1	New England Revolution	Columbus, OH
7:30 PM EDT	Wood 43'; Elcock (yellow card) 79', (goal) 87'	Report	Wise (yellow card) 40'; McKinley 75'; Galderisi (yellow card) 78'	Stadium: Ohio Stadium; Attendance: 15,718; Referee: Marcel Yonan; Assistant referees: Greg Barkey; Kermit Quisenberry (AR2)

August 30 26	Columbus Crew	2-0	Los Angeles Galaxy	Columbus, OH
7:30 PM EDT	Warzycha 5', 56'; Salcedo (yellow card) 43'	Report		Stadium: Ohio Stadium; Attendance: 16,167; Referee: Kevin Terry; Assistant referees: Delfrim Rainho; Tarek Khan; Fourth official: Hugh Cullin

September 6 27	Dallas Burn	3-0	Columbus Crew	Dallas, TX
8:30 PM EDT	Martinez (yellow card) 16'; Rodríguez 66'; Washington 74'; Webber 76'	Report	Khumalo (yellow card) 41'	Stadium: Cotton Bowl; Attendance: 10,383; Referee: Toru Kamikawa; Assistant referees: Jorge Reyes; Misail Tsapos; Fourth official: Ali Saheli

September 12 28	New England Revolution	1-0	Columbus Crew	Foxborough, MA
7:30 PM EDT	Naveda 3', (yellow card) 68'; Galderisi (yellow card) 32'; Chronopoulos (yellow card) 44'; Burns (yellow card) 79'; Keegan (yellow card) 83'	Report		Stadium: Foxboro Stadium; Attendance: 21,619; Referee: Ted Covaciu; Assistant referees: Greg Barkey; Peter Kokolski; Fourth official: Thomas Supple

September 14 29	Columbus Crew	4-0	Kansas City Wizards	Columbus, OH
3:00 PM EDT	Clark (yellow card) 8'; Wood 32'; Farrell 38'; Dooley 82'; Yeagley 83'	Report	Johnston (yellow card) 78'	Stadium: Ohio Stadium; Attendance: 15,132; Referee: Arturo Angeles; Assistant referees: Reggie Rutty; Brian Darling; Fourth official: Patrick Ruetschle

September 18 30	Tampa Bay Mutiny	2-1	Columbus Crew	Tampa, FL
7:30 PM EDT	Hejduk (yellow card) 6'; Conde (yellow card) 14'; Valderrama (yellow card) 39'; Gilmar 41'; George 89'	Report	Maisonneuve 83'	Stadium: Houlihan's Stadium; Attendance: 6,984; Referee: Toru Kamikawa; Assistant referees: Laszlo Nagy; George Banica; Fourth official: Kevin Terry

September 25 31	NY/NJ MetroStars	0-1	Columbus Crew	East Rutherford, NJ
7:30 PM EDT	Yeagley (yellow card) 40'; Clark 70'; Friedel (yellow card) 89'	Report	Semioli (yellow card) 43'; Branco (red card) 56'	Stadium: Giants Stadium; Attendance: 15,570; Referee: Rich Grady; Assistant referees: Nate Clement; Matt Lawlor; Fourth official: Jorge De La Bandera

September 28 32	Columbus Crew	1-1 (2-1 SO)	Tampa Bay Mutiny	Columbus, OH
3:00 PM EDT	Elcock (yellow card) 64' (yellow-red card) 78'; Maisonneuve 82'	Report	Shannon 24'; Ferruzzi (yellow card) 38'; Budnick (yellow card) 82'	Stadium: Ohio Stadium; Attendance: 22,259; Referee: Tim Weyland; Assistant referees: Roger Sill; Tarek Khan; Fourth official: Douglas Palomaki
	Shootout
	Marino (penalty scored); Wood (penalty scored); Maisonneuve (penalty missed); Salcedo (penalty missed)		(penalty missed) Vásquez; (penalty missed) Shannon; (penalty missed) Quill; (penalty scored) Hejduk; (penalty missed) Duhaney

=== MLS Cup Playoffs ===
==== Conference Semifinals ====
October 5 Game 1	Tampa Bay Mutiny	1-2	Columbus Crew	Tampa, Florida
3:00 PM EDT	Gilmar 35', (yellow card) 35'	Report	Farrell 11'; Clark (yellow card) 57'; Wood 83'; Warzycha (yellow card) 85'	Stadium: Houlihan's Stadium; Attendance: 8,272; Referee: Noel Kenny; Assistant referees: Greg Barkey; Chip Reed; Fourth official: Alberto Giordano

October 8 Game 2	Columbus Crew	2-0	Tampa Bay Mutiny	Columbus, Ohio
7:30 PM EDT	Dooley (yellow card) 8'; McBride 43'; Warzycha 73'	Report	Gilmar (yellow card) 21'; Vásquez (yellow card) 22'; Kooiman (yellow card) 24'	Stadium: Ohio Stadium; Attendance: 13,102; Referee: Joshua Patlak; Assistant referees: Greg Barkey; Chip Reed (AR2)
Note: Columbus Crew wins series 2-0, advances to Conference finals.

October 11 Game 3	Tampa Bay Mutiny	If Necessary	Columbus Crew	Tampa, Florida
7:30 PM EDT				Stadium: Houlihan's Stadium

==== Conference Finals ====
October 12 Game 1	D.C. United	3-2	Columbus Crew	Washington, D.C.
2:00 PM EDT	Sanneh 9', 45'; Díaz Arce 29'	Report	Dooley (yellow card) 38', (goal) 73'; Clark (yellow card) 41'; Farrell 57'; Warzycha (yellow card) 78'; Smith (red card) 87'	Stadium: Robert F. Kennedy Memorial Stadium; Attendance: 11,820; Referee: Kevin Terry; Assistant referees: Greg Barkey; Nate Clement (AR2)

October 15 Game 2	Columbus Crew	0-1	D.C. United	Columbus, Ohio
6:30 PM EDT	Warzycha (yellow card) 41'	Report	Llamosa (yellow card) 42'; Díaz Arce 47'	Stadium: Ohio Stadium; Attendance: 9,506; Referee: Arturo Angeles; Assistant referees: Edwin Resendes; Alex Prus (AR2)
Note: D.C. United wins series 2-0, advances to MLS Cup 1997.

October 19 Game 3	D.C. United	If Necessary	Columbus Crew	Washington, D.C.
				Stadium: Robert F. Kennedy Memorial Stadium

=== U.S. Open Cup ===
The Columbus Crew did not enter the U.S. Open Cup in this season.

== Statistics ==
=== Appearances and goals ===
Under "Apps" for each section, the first number represents the number of starts, and the second number represents appearances as a substitute.

No.	Pos	Nat	Player	Total		MLS		MLS Cup Playoffs	
No.	Pos	Nat	Player	Apps	Goals	Apps	Goals	Apps	Goals
1	GK	(United States) USA	Brad Friedel	33	0	29+0	0	4+0	0
2	DF	(Trinidad and Tobago) TTO	Ancil Elcock	29	1	21+5	1	3+0	0
3	DF	(United States) USA	Mike Clark	35	1	28+3	1	4+0	0
4	DF	(United States) USA	Janusz Michallik	10	0	6+4	0	0+0	0
5	DF	(United States) USA	Thomas Dooley	19	5	15+0	4	4+0	1
6	MF	(United States) USA	Todd Yeagley	31	2	22+5	2	4+0	0
7	MF	(United States) USA	Jorge Salcedo	30	1	26+2	1	0+2	0
8	MF	(United States) USA	A. J. Wood	19	4	16+0	3	1+2	1
9	FW	(United States) USA	Billy Thompson	10	1	4+2	1	3+1	0
10	MF	(United States) USA	Brian Maisonneuve	36	3	30+2	3	4+0	0
11	DF	(United States) USA	Mike Lapper	24	1	20+0	1	4+0	0
12	FW	(United States) USA	Pete Marino	32	8	7+21	8	0+4	0
13	MF	(United States) USA	Jason Farrell	22	4	10+8	2	4+0	2
15	MF	(South Africa) RSA	Doctor Khumalo	19	2	18+0	2	1+0	0
16	MF	(United States) USA	Rob Smith	27	0	8+17	0	0+2	0
18	GK	(United States) USA	David Winner	4	0	3+1	0	0+0	0
19	MF	(Poland) POL	Robert Warzycha	35	4	31+0	3	4+0	1
20	FW	(United States) USA	Brian McBride	17	7	13+0	6	4+0	1
22	FW	(Argentina) ARG	Marcelo Carrera	21	3	14+6	3	0+1	0
24	DF	(Argentina) ARG	Sergio Miguez	17	0	16+1	0	0+0	0
25	DF	(United States) USA	Ubusuku Abukusumo	1	0	0+1	0	0+0	0
26	GK	(United States) USA	Dusty Hudock	0	0	0+0	0	0+0	0
			Own goal	0	0	-	0	-	0
Players who left Columbus during the season:
8	DF	(United States) USA	Brian Bliss	12	1	10+2	1	0+0	0
14	MF	(Jamaica) JAM	Altimont Butler	1	0	1+0	0	0+0	0
17	DF	(United States) USA	Todd Miller	3	0	1+2	0	0+0	0
21	MF	(Poland) POL	Rob Jachym	3	0	1+2	0	0+0	0
23	FW	(United States) USA	Todd Deneault	0	0	0+0	0	0+0	0
25	FW	(Argentina) ARG	Silvio Rudman	6	0	2+4	0	0+0	0
26	GK	(England) ENG	Aidan Heaney	0	0	0+0	0	0+0	0
26	GK	(United States) USA	Eddie Carvacho	0	0	0+0	0	0+0	0
26	GK	(United States) USA	David Allred	0	0	0+0	0	0+0	0
26	GK	(United States) USA	Randy Dedini	0	0	0+0	0	0+0	0

=== Disciplinary record ===
No.	Pos.	Name	MLS		MLS Cup Playoffs		Total	
No.	Pos.	Name	Yellow card	Red card	Yellow card	Red card	Yellow card	Red card
1	GK	(United States) Brad Friedel	2	1	0	0	2	1
2	DF	(Trinidad and Tobago) Ancil Elcock	3	1	0	0	3	1
3	DF	(United States) Mike Clark	6	0	2	0	8	0
4	DF	(United States) Janusz Michallik	0	0	0	0	0	0
5	DF	(United States) Thomas Dooley	2	0	2	0	4	0
6	MF	(United States) Todd Yeagley	2	1	0	0	2	1
7	MF	(United States) Jorge Salcedo	3	0	0	0	3	0
8	MF	(United States) A. J. Wood	0	0	0	0	0	0
9	FW	(United States) Billy Thompson	0	0	0	0	0	0
10	MF	(United States) Brian Maisonneuve	2	0	0	0	2	0
11	DF	(United States) Mike Lapper	2	0	0	0	2	0
12	FW	(United States) Pete Marino	2	0	0	0	2	0
13	MF	(United States) Jason Farrell	0	0	0	0	0	0
15	MF	(South Africa) Doctor Khumalo	2	0	0	0	2	0
16	MF	(United States) Rob Smith	1	1	0	1	1	2
18	MF	(United States) David Winner	0	0	0	0	0	0
19	MF	(Poland) Robert Warzycha	6	0	3	0	9	0
20	FW	(United States) Brian McBride	3	0	0	0	3	0
22	FW	(Argentina) Marcelo Carrera	0	0	0	0	0	0
24	DF	(Argentina) Sergio Miguez	1	0	0	0	0	0
25	DF	(United States) Ubusuku Abukusumo	0	0	0	0	0	0
26	GK	(United States) Dusty Hudock	0	0	0	0	0	0
Players who left Columbus during the season:
8	DF	(United States) Brian Bliss	1	0	0	0	1	0
14	MF	(Jamaica) Altimont Butler	0	0	0	0	0	0
17	DF	(United States) Todd Miller	0	0	0	0	0	0
21	MF	(Poland) Rob Jachym	1	0	0	0	1	0
23	FW	(United States) Todd Deneault	0	0	0	0	0	0
25	FW	(Argentina) Silvio Rudman	1	0	0	0	1	0
26	GK	(England) Aidan Heaney	0	0	0	0	0	0
26	GK	(United States) Eddie Carvacho	0	0	0	0	0	0
26	GK	(United States) David Allred	0	0	0	0	0	0
26	GK	(United States) Randy Dedini	0	0	0	0	0	0

=== Clean sheets ===
No.	Name	MLS	MLS Cup Playoffs	Total	Games Played
1	(United States) Brad Friedel	7	1	8	33
18	(United States) David Winner	0	0	0	4
26	(United States) Dusty Hudock	0	0	0	0
Players who left Columbus during the season:
26	(England) Aidan Heaney	0	0	0	0
26	(United States) Eddie Carvacho	0	0	0	0
26	(United States) David Allred	0	0	0	0
26	(United States) Randy Dedini	0	0	0	0

== Transfers ==
=== In ===
Pos.	Player	Transferred from	Fee/notes	Date	Source
MF	(United States) Jorge Salcedo	(United States) Los Angeles Galaxy	Traded for the 1st overall pick in the 1997 MLS supplemental draft, which was traded from Colorado Rapids for Adrián Paz.	February 1, 1997	
MF	(Poland) Rob Jachym	(United States) Hartford Hawks	Drafted in round 1 of the 1997 MLS College Draft.	February 1, 1997	
FW	(United States) John Smith	(United States) Rollins Tars	Drafted in round 2 of the 1997 MLS College Draft.	February 2, 1997	
FW	(United States) Todd Deneault	(United States) South Florida Bulls	Drafted in round 1 of the 1997 MLS College Draft.	February 2, 1997	
MF	(United States) Jason Farrell	(United States) Seattle Sounders	Drafted in round 1 of the 1997 MLS supplemental draft.	February 2, 1997	
DF	(United States) Billy Clifford	(United States) South Carolina Shamrocks	Drafted in round 2 of the 1997 MLS supplemental draft.	February 2, 1997	
DF	(Argentina) Sergio Miguez	(Argentina) San Martín de Tucumán	Signed via discovery.	March 26, 1997	
DF	(Trinidad and Tobago) Ancil Elcock	(Trinidad and Tobago) Malta Carib Alcons	Signed via discovery.	March 31, 1997	
FW	(Argentina) Silvio Rudman	(Italy) Padova	Allocated by Major League Soccer	April 1, 1997	
FW	(United States) Thomas Dooley	(Germany) FC Schalke 04	Allocated by Major League Soccer	May 3, 1997	
FW	(United States) Mike Lapper	(England) Southend United F.C.	Allocated by Major League Soccer	June 3, 1997	
DF	(United States) Ubusuku Abukusumo	(United States) NC State Wolfpack	Allocated by Major League Soccer as part of MLS Project-40.	June 5, 1997	
MF	(United States) A. J. Wood	(United States) NY/NJ MetroStars	Traded for Brian Bliss	July 8, 1997	
FW	(United States) Frank Klopas	(United States) Kansas City Wizards	Traded for Pete Marino.	November 2, 1997	
GK	(United States) Mark Dougherty	(United States) Tampa Bay Mutiny	Selected in the 1997 MLS Waiver Draft.	November 17, 1997	

=== Loan in ===
Pos.	Player	Parent club	Length/Notes	Beginning	End	Source
GK	(England) Aidan Heaney	(United States) Carolina Dynamo		April 16, 1997	April 19, 1997	
GK	(United States) Eddie Carvacho	(United States) Atlanta Ruckus		July 11, 1997	July 14, 1997	
GK	(United States) David Allred	(United States) Raleigh Flyers		September 4, 1997	September 7, 1997	
GK	(United States) Randy Dedini	(United States) Nashville Metros		September 9, 1997	September 22, 1997	
GK	(United States) Dusty Hudock	(United States) Seattle Sounders		September 26, 1997	End of Season	

=== Out ===
Pos.	Player	Transferred to	Fee/notes	Date	Source
FW	(Uruguay) Adrián Paz	(United States) Colorado Rapids	Traded for the 1st overall pick in the 1997 MLS supplemental draft, which was then traded for Jorge Salcedo from Los Angeles Galaxy.	February 1, 1997	
DF	(Argentina) Ricardo Iribarren	(Argentina) Club Almagro	Departed team due to visa problems.	February 4, 1997	
DF	(United States) Billy Clifford	(United States) Jacksonville Cyclones	Placed on waivers.	March 7, 1997	
FW	(United States) John Smith	(United States) Orlando Sundogs	Placed on waivers.	March 14, 1997	
DF	(United States) Paul Caligiuri	(United States) Los Angeles Galaxy	Sued Major League Soccer over a contract clause and was re-allocated to Los Angeles Galaxy.	March 26, 1997	
MF	(Jamaica) Altimont Butler	Jamaica national football team		April 14, 1997	
DF	(United States) Todd Deneault		Placed on waivers.	April 22, 1997	
MF	(Poland) Rob Jachym	(United States) New England Revolution	Placed on waivers.	May 28, 1997	
FW	(Argentina) Silvio Rudman	(Mexico) C.D. Veracruz	Placed on waivers.	May 28, 1997	
MF	(United States) Brian Bliss	(United States) NY/NJ MetroStars	Traded for A. J. Wood	July 8, 1997	
DF	(United States) Todd Miller	(United States) Charleston Battery	Placed on waivers.	August 12, 1997	
FW	(United States) Pete Marino	(United States) Kansas City Wizards	Traded for Frank Klopas.	November 2, 1997	
MF	(United States) Jason Farrell	(United States) Chicago Fire	Drafted 7th in the 1997 MLS Expansion Draft.	November 6, 1997	
MF	(United States) Jorge Salcedo	(United States) Chicago Fire	Drafted 9th in the 1997 MLS Expansion Draft.	November 6, 1997	
MF	(United States) A. J. Wood	(United States) Chicago Fire	Drafted 21st in the 1997 MLS Expansion Draft.	November 6, 1997	
DF	(United States) Janusz Michallik	(United States) New England Revolution	Placed on waivers.	November 13, 1997	
GK	(United States) Brad Friedel	(England) Liverpool F.C.	Transfer, $1,600,000	December 19, 1997	
DF	(Argentina) Sergio Miguez	Retired	Contract expired.	December 31, 1997	
MF	(South Africa) Doctor Khumalo	(South Africa) Kaizer Chiefs	Contract expired.	December 31, 1997	

=== Loans out ===
Pos.	Player	Loanee club	Length/Notes	Beginning	End	Source
MF	(Poland) Rob Jachym	(United States) Milwaukee Rampage	Columbus retains right to recall		May 28, 1997	
DF	(United States) Todd Miller	(United States) Charleston Battery		June 7, 1997	June 10, 1997	

=== MLS Draft picks ===
Draft picks are not automatically signed to the team roster. Only those who are signed to a contract will be listed as transfers in. The picks for the Columbus Crew are listed below:

1997 Columbus Crew College Draft Picks
Round	Pick	Player	Position	College
1	3	(Poland) Rob Jachym	MF	Hartford
2	13	(United States) John Smith	FW	Rollins
3	23	(United States) Todd Deneault	FW	South Florida

1997 Columbus Crew Supplemental Draft Picks
Round	Pick	Player	Position	College
2	13	(United States) Jason Farrell	MF	Seattle Pacific
3	28	(United States) Billy Clifford	DF	South Carolina

1997 Columbus Crew Waiver Draft Picks
Round	Pick	Player	Position	Team
1	5	(United States) Mark Dougherty	GK	Tampa Bay Mutiny
2	10	(United States) Bill Harte	DF	Tampa Bay Mutiny

== Awards ==
=== MLS Player of the Week ===
Week	Player	Opponent(s)	Link
7	(South Africa) Doctor Khumalo	San Jose Clash	
20	(United States) Thomas Dooley	D.C. United	

=== MLS Player of the Month ===
Month	Player	Stats	Link
August	(United States) Brad Friedel		

=== 1997 MLS All-Star Game ===
Starters

- FW Robert Warzycha

Reserves

- FW Brian McBride

=== Postseason ===
MLS Fair Play Team Award
MLS Best XI

- GK Brad Friedel
- DF Thomas Dooley

MLS Goalkeeper of the Year

- GK Brad Friedel

=== Crew Team Awards ===
- Most Valuable Player – Brad Friedel
- Defensive Player of the Year – Brad Friedel
- Scoring Champion – Pete Marino
- Man of the Year – Thomas Dooley
- Coach's Award – Mike Lapper
