= 1997 MLS expansion draft =

Player draft for MLS teams

1997 MLS Expansion Draft

General information
- Date: November 6, 1997

Overview
- Expansion teams: Chicago Fire; Miami Fusion F.C.
- Expansion season: 1998

The 1997 MLS Expansion Draft was held November 6, 1997. Two teams participated, the Chicago Fire and Miami Fusion F.C., both expansion Major League Soccer clubs starting play in the 1998 season.

== Format ==
Each team in the league made ten players, including at least one foreign player, available for the Fire and Fusion to select. From this pool of available players, the two teams then selected twelve players. Although Paul Caligiuri of the Los Angeles Galaxy was listed as exposed, he had recently won a lawsuit against the league which forced the league to place him with the Galaxy as his original contract with the league had stipulated. Consequently, he was not available for selection. The Fire won the first selection through a coin toss. The draft was held via conference call.

== Expansion Draft ==
Pick	Selecting Team	Player	Position	Previous team
1	Chicago Fire	Danny Pena	D	Los Angeles Galaxy
2	Miami Fusion	David Vaudreuil	D/M	D.C. United
3	Chicago Fire	Kevin Hartman	GK	Los Angeles Galaxy
4	Miami Fusion	John Maessner	M	D.C. United
5	Chicago Fire	Manny Lagos	M	MetroStars
6	Miami Fusion	Kris Kelderman	D/M	D.C. United
7	Chicago Fire	Jason Farrell	M	Columbus Crew
8	Miami Fusion	Joey Martinez	D	Dallas Burn
9	Chicago Fire	Jorge Salcedo	M	Columbus Crew
10	Miami Fusion	Jeff Cassar	GK	Dallas Burn
11	Chicago Fire	Zach Thornton	GK	MetroStars
12	Miami Fusion	Nelson Vargas	M	Tampa Bay Mutiny
13	Chicago Fire	Francis Okaroh	D	New England Revolution
14	Miami Fusion	Cle Kooiman	D	Tampa Bay Mutiny
15	Chicago Fire	Diego Gutierrez	M	Kansas City Wizards
16	Miami Fusion	Ramiro Corrales	D	San Jose Clash
17	Chicago Fire	Andrew Lewis	D	MetroStars
18	Miami Fusion	Matt Kmosko	D	Colorado Rapids
19	Chicago Fire	Brian Bates	D	Colorado Rapids
20	Miami Fusion	Scott Budnick	GK	Tampa Bay Mutiny
21	Chicago Fire	A.J. Wood	F	Columbus Crew
22	Miami Fusion	Wade Webber	D	Dallas Burn
23	Chicago Fire	Steve Patterson	F	Colorado Rapids
24	Miami Fusion	Bryan Taylor	F	Los Angeles Galaxy

== Team-by Team breakdown ==
=== Colorado Rapids ===
Exposed	Protected
Rafael Amaya (M)	Marcelo Balboa (D)
Brian Bates (D)	Paul Bravo (M)
Tote Castaneda (M)	Marcus Hahnemann (GK)
Paul Grafer (GK)	Wolde Harris (F)
Sean Henderson (M)	Chris Henderson (M)
Tahj Jakins (D)	David Patiño (M)
Matt Kmosko (D)	Ross Paule (M)
Chris Martinez (D)	Adrián Paz (F)
Steve Patterson (F)	Steve Trittschuh (D)
Steve Rammel (F)	Peter Vermes (D)
	Joey DiGiamarino (M)

- Withdrew Sean Henderson upon selection of Matt Kmosko(18)
- Withdrew Paul Grafer upon selection of Brian Bates (19)
- Reached maximum upon selection of Steve Patterson (23)

=== Columbus Crew ===
Exposed	Protected
Marcelo Carrera (F)	Thomas Dooley (D/M)
Mike Clark (D)	Ansil Elcock (D/M)
Jason Farrell (M)	Brad Friedel (GK)
Janusz Michallik (D)	Doctor Khumalo (M)
Sergio Miguez (D)	Frank Klopas (F)
Jorge Salcedo (M)	Mike Lapper (D/M)
Rob Smith (M)	Brian Maisonneuve (M)
Billy Thompson (F)	Brian McBride (F)
A.J. Wood (F)	Robert Warzycha (M)
David Winner (GK)	Todd Yeagley (D/M)
	Ubusuku Abukusumo (D/M)

- Withdrew Billy Thompson upon selection of Jason Farrell(7)
- Withdrew Mike Clark upon selection of Jorge Salcedo (9)
- Reached maximum upon selection of A.J. Wood (21)

=== D.C. United ===
Exposed	Protected
Scott Garlick (GK)	Jeff Agoos (D)
Ben Iroha (D/M)	Raúl Díaz Arce (F)
Brian Kamler (M)	Marco Etcheverry (F)
Kris Kelderman (D)	Mario Gori (D)
Jesse Marsch (M)	John Harkes (M)
Clint Peay (D)	Carlos Llamosa (D)
John Maessner (M)	Jaime Moreno (F)
Tom Presthus (GK)	Eddie Pope (D)
Mark Simpson (GK)	Tony Sanneh (M)
David Vaudreuil (D)	Richie Williams (M)
Roy Wegerle (F)	

- Withdrew Scott Garlick upon selection of David Vaudreuil (2)
- Withdrew Roy Wegerle upon selection of John Maessner (4)
- Reached maximum upon selection of Kris Kelderman (6)

=== Dallas Burn ===
Exposed	Protected
Jeff Cassar (GK)	Damian (F)
Eric Dade (D)	Mark Dodd (GK)
Richard Farrer (F)	Ted Eck (M/F)
Jorge Flores (M)	Gerell Elliott (M/F)
Brian Haynes (F)	Jason Kreis (M)
Garth Lagerwey (GK)	Brandon Pollard (D)
Joey Martinez (D)	Jorge Rodríguez (D)
Daniel Peinado (M)	Mark Santel (D/M)
Tom Soehn (D)	Alain Sutter (M)
Temoc Suarez (F)	Dante Washington (F)
Wade Webber (D)	Juan Sastoque (F)

- Withdrew Eric Dade upon selection of Joey Martinez (8)
- Withdrew Temoc Suarez upon selection of Jeff Cassar (10)
- Reached maximum upon selection of Wade Webber (22)

=== Kansas City Wizards ===
Exposed	Protected
Jake Dancy (D)	Mike Ammann (GK)
John DeBrito (F)	Sean Bowers (D)
Diego Gutierrez (D/M)	Mark Chung (M)
Brian Johnson (M)	Mo Johnston (M/F)
Steve Pittman (D)	Pete Marino (F)
Edmundo Rodriguez (D)	Matt McKeon (D)
Dionysius Sebwe (D)	Uche Okafor (D)
Chris Snitko (GK)	Preki (M)
Scott Uderitz (D)	Vitalis Takawira (F)
Paul Wright (M/F)	Ryan Tinsley (M)
	Nino Da Silva (M)

- Withdrew Brian Johnson upon selection of Diego Gutierrez (15)

=== Los Angeles Galaxy ===
Exposed	Protected
Paul Caligiuri (D)	Chris Armas (M)
Ezra Hendrickson (D)	Dan Calichman (D)
Kevin Hartman (GK)	Jorge Campos (GK)
Guillermo Jara (F)	Mauricio Cienfuegos (M)
Steve Jolley (M)	Robin Fraser (D)
Harut Karapetyan (F)	Eduardo Hurtado (F)
Peter Lak (D)	Cobi Jones (M)
Gerardo Laterza (M)	Martín Machón (M)
Danny Pena (D)	Greg Vanney (M)
Bryan Taylor (F)	Welton (F)
Jose Vasquez (D)	Jose Botello (F)

- Withdrew Harut Karapetyan upon selection of Danny Pena (1)
- Withdrew Steve Jolley upon selection of Kevin Hartman (3)
- Reached maximum upon selection of Bryan Taylor (24)

=== MetroStars ===
Exposed	Protected
Brian Bliss (D)	Shaun Bartlett (F)
Braeden Cloutier (M)	Antony de Ávila (F)
Cristian da Silva (D)	Rhett Harty (D)
Matt Knowles (D)	Miles Joseph (F)
Manny Lagos (M)	Brian Kelly (M)
Andrew Lewis (D)	Tony Meola (GK)
Joao Luiz (D)	Tab Ramos (M)
Zach Thornton (GK)	Giovanni Savarese (F)
Jeff Zaun (D)	Mark Semioli (D)
Kerry Zavagnin (D)	Mike Sorber (M)
	Carlos Parra (M)

- Withdrew Brian Bliss upon selection of Manny Lagos (5)
- Withdrew Jeff Zaun upon selection of Zach Thornton (11)
- Reached maximum upon selection of Andrew Lewis (17)

=== New England Revolution ===
Exposed	Protected
Jeff Causey (GK)	Imad Baba (M)
Scott Coufal (GK)	Mike Burns (D/M)
Giuseppe Galderisi (F)	Ted Chronopoulos (D/M)
Erik Imler (D)	Alejandro Farias (M)
Rob Jachym (F)	Paul Keegan (F)
John Kerr (M)	Alexi Lalas (D)
Steve Klein (M)	Ivan McKinley (M)
Alberto Naveda (M/F)	Joe-Max Moore (M)
Francis Okaroh (D)	Leonardo Squadrone (D)
Darren Sawatzky (M/F)	Walter Zenga (GK)
Evans Wise (M)	Brian Dunseth (D)

- Withdrew Steve Klein upon selection of Francis Okaroh (13)

=== San Jose Clash ===
Exposed	Protected
Ramiro Corrales (D)	Jeff Baicher (F)
Zico (M)	Ronald Cerritos (M/F)
Oscar Draguicevich (D)	Curt Onalfo (D)
Dominic Kinnear (M)	John Doyle (D)
Tim Martin (D)	Michael Emenalo (D)
Shawn Medved (M)	David Kramer (GK)
Michael Emenalo (D)	Eddie Lewis (M)
Dave Salzwedel (GK)	Lawrence Lozzano (F)
Christopher Sullivan (M/F)	Eric Wynalda (F)
István Urbányi (M)	Troy Dayak (D)
	Esmundo Rodriguez (M)

- Withdrew Shawn Medved upon selection of Ramiro Corrales (16)

=== Tampa Bay Mutiny ===
Exposed	Protected
Derek Backman (M)	Mike Duhaney (D)
Scott Budnick (GK)	Gilmar (M/F)
Chiquinho Conde (F)	Frankie Hejduk (D)
Mark Dougherty (GK)	Roy Lassiter (F)
Marco Ferruzzi (M)	Steve Ralston (M)
Adam Frye (D)	Carlos Valderrama (M)
Sam George (M)	Martín Vásquez (M)
Bill Harte (D)	Frank Yallop (D)
Cle Kooiman (D)	Joao Batista (M)
Alan Prampin (F)	Jacek Ziober (F)
Musa Shannon (M/F)	Eric Quill (F)
Nelson Vargas (M)	

- Withdrew Alan Prampin upon selection of Nelson Vargas (12)
- Withdrew Sam George upon selection of Cle Kooiman (14)
- Reached maximum upon selection of Scott Budnick (20)
