= 1997 Dallas Burn season =

Dallas Burn
1997 season
- Owner: Major League Soccer
- Head coach: Dave Dir
- Stadium: Cotton Bowl
- MLS: Western Conference: 3rd Overall: 5th
- MLS Cup: Lost Western Conference Finals vs. Colorado Rapids (0–2)
- U.S. Open Cup: Won Championship vs. D.C. United (1–0)
- Average home league attendance: 9,678
Home colors	Away colors

The 1997 Dallas Burn season was the second season of the Major League Soccer team. The team made the playoffs for the second consecutive year. The team also won the U.S. Open Cup during the season.

== Final standings ==
Pos	Team	Pld	W	SOW	L	GF	GA	GD	Pts	Qualification
1	Kansas City Wizards	32	14	7	11	57	51	+6	49	MLS Cup Playoffs
2	Los Angeles Galaxy	32	14	2	16	55	44	+11	44	MLS Cup Playoffs
3	Dallas Burn	32	13	3	16	55	49	+6	42	MLS Cup Playoffs
4	Colorado Rapids	32	12	2	18	50	59	−9	38	MLS Cup Playoffs
5	San Jose Clash	32	9	3	20	55	59	−4	30	

Source: MLS

== Regular season ==
March 29, 1997 1	New England Revolution	1–0	Dallas Burn	Dallas, Texas
2:00 PM CST	Squadrone (yellow card) 19'; Dade 38' (o.g.)	Report at the Wayback Machine (archived January 23, 1998)		Stadium: Cotton Bowl; Attendance: 11,063; Referee: Raul Dominguez; Assistant referees: Tom Bobadilla; Paul Scott

April 5, 1997 2	San Jose Clash	1–2	Dallas Burn	Dallas, Texas
7:30 PM CDT	Medved (red card) 33'; Dayak 57'; Wynalda (yellow card) 84'	Report at the Wayback Machine (archived January 23, 1998)	Soñora (yellow card) 27'; Santel 37'; Kreis (yellow card) 41'; Elliott 86'	Stadium: Cotton Bowl; Attendance: 6,195; Referee: Kevin Stott; Assistant referees: Roger Itaya; Glenn Prechac

April 13, 1997 3	Dallas Burn	1–2	Columbus Crew	Columbus, Ohio
3:00 PM EDT	Rodríguez 53'; Santel (yellow card) 55'; Soehn (yellow card) 62'	Report at the Wayback Machine (archived January 23, 1998)	McBride 6', 75' (pen.)	Stadium: Ohio Stadium; Attendance: 10,662; Referee: Kevin Terry; Assistant referees: Roberto Van de Wyngard; Richard Eddy

April 18, 1997 4	Dallas Burn	1–2	Kansas City Wizards	Kansas City, Missouri
7:30 PM CDT	Elliott 39'; Santel (yellow card) 49'; Rodríguez (yellow card) 71'; Peinado (yellow card) 85'	Report at the Wayback Machine (archived January 23, 1998)	Klopas 22'; Chung 80'	Stadium: Arrowhead Stadium; Attendance: 6,272; Referee: John Weselak; Assistant referees: Alex Prus; Alan Shepherd

April 20, 1997 5	Colorado Rapids	1–4	Dallas Burn	Dallas, Texas
2:00 PM CDT	Jakins (yellow card) 18'; Henderson 73' (pen.)	Report at the Wayback Machine (archived January 23, 1998)	Washington 25', 77'; Martinez (yellow card) 47'; Suarez 49'; Elliott 57'	Stadium: Cotton Bowl; Attendance: 5,911; Referee: Arturo Angeles; Assistant referees: Andrew Barnes; Misail Tsapos

April 23, 1997 6	Dallas Burn	0–1	Colorado Rapids	Denver, Colorado
7:00 PM MDT		Report at the Wayback Machine (archived January 23, 1998)	Bravo 25'; Trittschuh (yellow card) 76'	Stadium: Mile High Stadium; Attendance: 4,120; Referee: Esse Baharmast; Assistant referees: Susan Cicchinelli; Rudy Bettman

April 26, 1997 7	Dallas Burn	1–1 (4–1 SO)	Los Angeles Galaxy	Pasadena, California
7:30 PM PDT	Washington (yellow card) 42'; Elliott 70'	Report at the Wayback Machine (archived January 23, 1998)	Cienfuegos 73' (pen.)	Stadium: Rose Bowl; Attendance: 15,247; Referee: Ted Covaciou; Assistant referees: Roberto Van De Wyngard; Bryan Elliott
	Shootout
	Hattrup (penalty scored); Soehn (penalty scored); Santel (penalty scored); Elliott (penalty scored)		Wélton (penalty missed); Vanney (penalty missed); Jones (penalty scored)

May 4, 1997 8	D.C. United	2–2 (2–3 SO)	Dallas Burn	Dallas, Texas
4:00 PM CDT	Agoos 5'; Moreno 88'	Report at the Wayback Machine (archived January 23, 1998)	Agoos 33' (o.g); Kreis 76' (pen.)	Stadium: Cotton Bowl; Attendance: 12,166; Referee: Brian Hall; Assistant referees: Richard Heron; Sergio Vega
	Shootout
	Agoos (penalty missed); Vaudreuil (penalty scored); Moreno (penalty scored); Kelderman (penalty missed); Rammel (penalty missed)		Hattrup (penalty scored); Soehn (penalty scored); Santel (penalty missed); Elliott (penalty missed); Eck (penalty scored)

May 10, 1997 9	Dallas Burn	2–2 (2–1 SO)	D.C. United	Washington, D.C.
4:00 PM EDT	Washington 2'; Peinado (yellow card) 32'; Rodríguez (yellow card) 54'; Sutter (yellow card) 61'; Kreis 88' (pen.)	Report at the Wayback Machine (archived January 23, 1998)	Etcheverry (yellow card) 37'; Díaz Arce 50'; Pope 75'; Harkes (yellow card) 86'	Stadium: Robert F. Kennedy Memorial Stadium; Attendance: 15,493; Referee: Zim Boulas; Assistant referees: Laszlo Nagy; Todd Perry
	Shootout
	Hattrup (penalty scored); Soehn (penalty missed); Santel (penalty missed); Kreis (penalty missed); Eck (penalty scored)		Etcheverry (penalty missed); Moreno (penalty missed); Agoos (penalty missed); Díaz Arce (penalty scored); Cruz (penalty missed)

May 17, 1997 10	Tampa Bay Mutiny	0–2	Dallas Burn	Dallas, Texas
7:30 PM CDT	Frye (yellow card) 27'; Lassiter (yellow card) 63'; Batista (yellow card) 65'; Dougherty (yellow card) 87'	Report at the Wayback Machine (archived January 23, 1998)	Dade (yellow card) 13'; Soñora (yellow card) 16'; Washington 25'; Sutter (yellow card) 39'; Peinado (yellow card) 41'; Álvarez 63' (pen.)	Stadium: Cotton Bowl; Attendance: 15,236; Referee: Zim Boulos; Assistant referees: Susan Cicchinelli; Misail Tsapos

May 23, 1997 11	Dallas Burn	3–1	Tampa Bay Mutiny	Tampa, Florida
7:30 PM EDT	Soñora 37'; Sutter 52'; Elliott 72'; Washington (yellow card) 76'	Report at the Wayback Machine (archived January 23, 1998)	McKinley (yellow card) 17'; Valderrama (yellow card) 35'; Lassiter 57'; Kooiman (red card) 58'; Galderisi (yellow card) 60'	Stadium: Houlihan's Stadium; Attendance: 10,112; Referee: Raul Dominguez; Assistant referees: Craig Lowry; Roger O'Brien

June 1, 1997 12	Dallas Burn	1–3	New England Revolution	Foxborough, Massachusetts
4:00 PM EDT	Eck 41'	Report at the Wayback Machine (archived January 23, 1998)	A. Lalas (yellow card) 16'; Conde 63'; Baba 65', 82'	Stadium: Foxboro Stadium; Attendance: 10,242; Referee: Tim Weyland; Assistant referees: Ted Covaciu-Woods; Peter Kokolski

June 6, 1997 13	Kansas City Wizards	1–1 (2–1 SO)	Dallas Burn	Dallas, Texas
7:30 PM CDT	Álvarez (yellow card) 45' (goal) 49'	Report at the Wayback Machine (archived January 23, 1998)	Okafor (yellow card) 28'; Johnston (yellow card) 46'; Wright 52'; McKeon (yellow card) 57'	Stadium: Cotton Bowl; Attendance: 9,014; Referee: Arturo Angeles; Assistant referees: Zekai Akbay; Glenn Prechac
	Shootout
	Chung (penalty scored); Klopas (penalty scored); Preki (penalty missed); Wright (penalty missed); McKeon (penalty scored)		Soehn (penalty missed); Santel (penalty scored); Washington (penalty missed); Eck (penalty missed)

June 15, 1997 14	New York/New Jersey MetroStars	1–3	Dallas Burn	Dallas, Texas
6:00 PM CDT	Harty (yellow card) 10'; Joseph 54'; Hendrickson (yellow card) 59'	Report at the Wayback Machine (archived January 23, 1998)	Washington 48'; Álvarez 62'; Kreis 74' (pen.)	Stadium: Cotton Bowl; Attendance: 10,897; Referee: Brian Hall; Assistant referees: Glenn Prechac; Misail Tsapos

June 22, 1997 15	Dallas Burn	2–2 (1–2 SO)	New England Revolution	Foxborough, Massachusetts
3:00 PM EDT	Webber (yellow card) 4'; Álvarez 19' (yellow card) 31'; Kreis 23'; Santel (yellow card) 68'	Report at the Wayback Machine (archived January 23, 1998)	Farías 29'; Lalas 65'	Stadium: Foxboro Stadium; Attendance: 15,819; Referee: Noel Kenny; Assistant referees: George Vergara; Fred DeBrun
	Shootout
	Santel (penalty missed); Soehn (penalty scored); Soñora (penalty missed); Elliott (penalty missed); Eck (penalty missed)		Baba (penalty scored); Naveda (penalty missed); Imler (penalty missed); Okaroh (penalty scored)

June 28, 1997 16	Dallas Burn	1–3	San Jose Clash	San Jose, California
7:30 PM PDT	Álvarez 18' (yellow card) 69'; Soehn (yellow card) 79'	Report at the Wayback Machine (archived January 23, 1998)	Urbányi (yellow card) 29'; Medved 48'; Emenalo (yellow card) 57'; Baicher (yellow card) 67'; Lozzano 71'; Dayak (yellow card) 86'; Kinnear 89'	Stadium: Spartan Stadium; Attendance: 11,491; Referee: Raul Dominguez; Assistant referees: Tom Bobadilla; Javier Padilla

July 4, 1997 17	D.C. United	3–2	Dallas Burn	Cotton Bowl
7:30 PM CDT	Iroha 2'; Sanneh 23'; Díaz Arce 74'	Report at the Wayback Machine (archived January 23, 1998)	Peinado 4'; Álvarez 54'	Attendance: 16,089; Referee: Kevin Stott; Assistant referees: Lazlo Nagy; Glenn Prechac

July 6, 1997 18	Dallas Burn	3–1	Kansas City Wizards	Kansas City, Missouri
2:00 PM CDT	Rodríguez 47', 81'; Sutter 70' (yellow card) 72'; Kreis (yellow card) 79'	Report at the Wayback Machine (archived January 23, 1998)	Tinsley 54'; Klopas (yellow card) 74'; McKeon (yellow card) 79'	Stadium: Arrowhead Stadium; Attendance: 9,205; Referee: Paul Tamberino; Assistant referees: Paul Scott; Alan Shepherd

July 13, 1997 19	Dallas Burn	2–1	Columbus Crew	Columbus, Ohio
3:00 PM EDT	Webber 20'; Flores 45'	Report at the Wayback Machine (archived January 23, 1998)	McBride 17'	Stadium: Ohio Stadium; Attendance: 12,329; Referee: Robert Sheker; Assistant referees: Paul Tamberino; Tarek Khan

July 18, 1997 20	San Jose Clash	1–3	Dallas Burn	Dallas, Texas
7:30 PM CDT	Baicher 25'; Kinnear (yellow card) 39'; Draguicevich (yellow card) 58'; Dayak (yellow card) 75'	Report at the Wayback Machine (archived January 23, 1998)	Kreis (yellow card) 41'; Washington 42', 46', 68'; Álvarez (yellow card) 46'; Peinado (yellow card) 59'	Stadium: Cotton Bowl; Attendance: 7,371; Referee: Tim Weyland; Assistant referees: Scott Weyland; Glenn Prechac

July 20, 1997 21	Dallas Burn	4–2	Colorado Rapids	Denver, Colorado
6:00 PM MDT	Álvarez (yellow card) 21' (goal) 31', 64' (pen.); Washington 73'; Peinado 82'	Report at the Wayback Machine (archived January 23, 1998)	Paz 5', 13'	Stadium: Mile High Stadium; Attendance: 8,125; Referee: Arturo Angeles; Assistant referees: Alex Prus; Kevin Yant

July 25, 1997 22	Los Angeles Galaxy	3–0	Dallas Burn	Dallas, Texas
7:30 PM CDT	Machón (yellow card) 17'; Fraser (yellow card) 34'; Cienfuegos 57' (pen.); Hurtado 66', 77'	Report at the Wayback Machine (archived January 23, 1998)	Washington (yellow card) 56'	Stadium: Cotton Bowl; Attendance: 13,136; Referee: Rich Grady; Assistant referees: Tom Bobadilla; Paul Scott

August 2, 1997 23	Kansas City Wizards	2–1	Dallas Burn	Dallas, Texas
7:00 PM CDT	Chung 63'; Preki 78' (pen.); McKeon (yellow card) 80'	Report at the Wayback Machine (archived January 23, 1998)	Soehn (yellow card) 51'; Pollard (yellow card) 66'; Elliott 75'; Álvarez (yellow card) 80'	Stadium: Cotton Bowl; Attendance: 7,910; Referee: Zim Boulos; Assistant referees: Paul Scott; Kevin Terry

August 15, 1997 24	Dallas Burn	1–2	Tampa Bay Mutiny	Tampa, Florida
7:30 PM EDT	Martinez (yellow card) 54'; Kreis 88'	Report at the Wayback Machine (archived January 23, 1998)	George 28'; Lassiter 69'; Dougherty (yellow card) 89'	Stadium: Tampa Stadium; Attendance: 8,329; Referee: Robert Sheker; Assistant referees: Andrew Barnes; Mario Martinez

August 23, 1997 25	New York/New Jersey MetroStars	2–1	Dallas Burn	Dallas, Texas
7:30 PM CDT	Martinez 60' (o.g.); Savarese 76'	Report at the Wayback Machine (archived January 23, 1998)	Washington (yellow card) 24'; Álvarez (yellow card) 25' (red card) 74' (goal) 58' (pen.); Martinez (yellow card) 65'	Stadium: Cotton Bowl; Attendance: 9,092; Referee: Rich Grady; Assistant referees: Roger Sill; Andrew Barnes

August 31, 1997 26	Colorado Rapids	1–4	Dallas Burn	Dallas, Texas
2:00 PM CDT	Myernick (red card) 32'; Paz (yellow card) 43'; Trittschuh 71' (yellow card) 76'	Report at the Wayback Machine (archived January 23, 1998)	Kreis 31' (pen.), 76'; Rodríguez (yellow card) 39'; Washington 35', 67'	Stadium: Cotton Bowl; Attendance: 4,451; Referee: Raul Dominguez; Assistant referees: Roger Itaya; Sergio Vega

September 6, 1997 27	Columbus Crew	0–3	Dallas Burn	Dallas, Texas
7:30 PM CDT	Khumalo (yellow card) 41'	Report at the Wayback Machine (archived January 23, 1998)	Martinez (yellow card) 16'; Rodríguez 66'; Washington 74'; Webber 76'	Stadium: Cotton Bowl; Attendance: 10,383; Referee: Toru Kamikawa; Assistant referees: Jorge Reyes; Misail Tsapos

September 11, 1997 28	Dallas Burn	1–0	San Jose Clash	San Jose, California
7:30 PM PDT	Álvarez 70'; Washington (yellow card) 80'	Report at the Wayback Machine (archived January 23, 1998)	Doyle (yellow card) 27'	Stadium: Spartan Stadium; Attendance: 7,955; Referee: Tim Weyland; Assistant referees: Scott Weyland; Ricardo Valenzuela

September 14, 1997 29	Los Angeles Galaxy	1–3	Dallas Burn	Dallas, Texas
2:00 PM CDT	Karapetyan 44'; Pena 60'; Jones 65'	Report at the Wayback Machine (archived January 23, 1998)	Álvarez (yellow card) 80'; Santel 89'	Stadium: Cotton Bowl; Attendance: 9,032; Referee: Joshua Patlak; Assistant referees: Frank Gorog; Glenn Prechac

September 16, 1997 30	Dallas Burn	1–0	New York/New Jersey MetroStars	East Rutherford, New Jersey
7:30 PM EDT	Haynes (yellow card) 15'; Kreis 33'	Report at the Wayback Machine (archived January 23, 1998)		Stadium: Giants Stadium; Attendance: 11,484; Referee: Brian Hall; Assistant referees: Alex Prus; Matt Lawlor

September 19, 1997 31	Dallas Burn	1–2	Los Angeles Galaxy	Pasadena, California
7:30 PM PDT	Álvarez 54' (pen.) (yellow card) 90'; Santel (yellow card) 58'; Peinado (red card) 76'	Report at the Wayback Machine (archived January 23, 1998)	Pena (yellow card) 10'; Karapetyan (yellow card) 33'; Armas 35'; Wélton 83'	Stadium: Rose Bowl; Attendance: 19,421; Referee: Rich Grady; Assistant referees: Levon Baladjanian; Theodore Bennett

September 25, 1997 32	New England Revolution	2–1	Dallas Burn	Dallas, Texas
7:30 PM CDT	Galderisi (yellow card) 56'; Moore 58' (pen.); Burns (yellow card) 59'; Keegan 88'	Report at the Wayback Machine (archived January 23, 1998)	Elliott 31'	Stadium: Cotton Bowl; Attendance: 6,897; Referee: Brian Hall; Assistant referees: Paul Scott; Sergio Vega

== Playoffs ==
=== Western Conference semifinals ===
October 5, 1997 Game 1	Dallas Burn	0–0 (2–0 SO)	Los Angeles Galaxy	Pasadena, California
5:00 PM PDT	Sutter (yellow card) 9'; Eck (yellow card) 61'	Report, archived from the original on January 23, 1998	Vanney (yellow card) 9'; Peña (yellow card) 68'	Stadium: Rose Bowl; Attendance: 18,921; Referee: Kevin Stott; Assistant referees: Michael Kennedy; Edwin Resendes
	Shootout
	Sutter (penalty scored); Soehn (penalty missed); Santel (penalty missed); Álvarez (penalty scored)		Karapetyan (penalty missed); Armas (penalty missed); Machón (penalty missed); Vanney (penalty missed)

October 8, 1997 Game 2	Los Angeles Galaxy	0–3	Dallas Burn	Dallas, Texas
7:30 PM CDT	Peña (yellow card) 17'; Calichman (yellow card) 35'	Report at the Wayback Machine (archived January 23, 1998)	Washington 29', 69'; Santel (yellow card) 42'; Peinado 86'; Álvarez (yellow card)	Stadium: Cotton Bowl; Attendance: 11,248; Referee: Esse Baharmast; Assistant referees: Tom Bobadilla; Roger Sill

=== Western Conference finals ===
October 12, 1997 Game 1	Colorado Rapids	1–0	Dallas Burn	Dallas, Texas
12:00 PM CDT	Bravo (yellow card) 39'; Vermes (yellow card) 39'; S. Henderson 42'	Report at the Wayback Machine (archived January 23, 1998)	Washington (yellow card) 9'; Kreis (yellow card) 74'	Stadium: Cotton Bowl; Attendance: 7,376; Referee: Kevin Stott; Assistant referees: Michael Kennedy; Susan Cicchinelli

October 15, 1997 Game 2	Dallas Burn	1–2	Colorado Rapids	Denver, Colorado
7:00 PM MDT	Álvarez 5'; Webber (yellow card) 45'	Report at the Wayback Machine (archived January 23, 1998)	Patiño 23'; Kmosko (yellow card) 48'; C. Henderson 87'	Stadium: Mile High Stadium; Attendance: 18,452; Referee: Noel Kenny; Assistant referees: Arthur Reed; Ted Covaciu-Woods

== U.S. Open Cup ==
July 29, 1997 Third Round	Dallas Burn (Texas)	3–0	(Louisiana) New Orleans Riverboat Gamblers	Metarie, Louisiana
7:00 PM CDT	Kreis 39' (red card) 89'; Pollard (yellow card) 50'; Washington (yellow card) 65'; Santel 70'; Elliott 74'	Report at the Wayback Machine (archived January 23, 1998)	Restrepo (yellow card) 36'	Stadium: Zephyr Field; Attendance: 6,269; Referee: Zim Boulos; Assistant referees: Andrew Barnes; Mike Williams

August 10, 1997 Quarterfinal	Dallas Burn (Texas)	4–1	(Illinois) Chicago Stingers	Arlington Heights, Illinois
7:00 PM CDT	Martinez (yellow card) 34'; Álvarez 41'; Washington 43'; Eck 69', 84'	MLS Report at the Wayback Machine (archived January 23, 1998); USISL Report at the Wayback Machine (archived October 7, 1997)	Deck 63'; Muhr (yellow card) 73'	Stadium: Forest View Park; Attendance: 3,810

September 2, 1997 Semifinal	Dallas Burn (Texas)	2–1 (a.e.t.)	New York/New Jersey MetroStars	New York, New York
7:30 PM EDT	Álvarez 17' (yellow card) 83'; Flores (yellow card) 75' 103'; Pollard (yellow card) 93'; Soehn (yellow card) 100'	Report at the Wayback Machine (archived January 23, 1998)	De Ávila (yellow card) 8'; Harty (yellow card) 60'; Branco 85'	Stadium: Baker Field; Attendance: 1,201; Referee: Richard Grady; Assistant referees: Gerry Corrie; John Konstantinidis

October 29, 1997 Final	Dallas Burn (Texas)	0–0 (a.e.t.) (5–3 p)	(Washington, D.C.) D.C. United	Indianapolis, Indiana
7:30 PM EST	Santel (yellow card) 12'; Álvarez (yellow card) 105'	Report at the Wayback Machine (archived January 23, 1998)	Moreno (yellow card) 70'; Etcheverry (yellow card) 95'	Stadium: Carroll Stadium at IUPUI; Attendance: 9,766; Referee: Richard Grady
	Penalties
	Álvarez (penalty scored); Kreis (penalty scored); Sutter (penalty scored); Peinado (penalty scored); Rodríguez (penalty scored)		Etcheverry (penalty scored); Díaz Arce (penalty missed); Moreno (penalty scored); Iroha (penalty scored)
