= 1997 D.C. United season =

D.C. United
1997 season
- General manager: Dave Kasper
- Head coach: Bruce Arena
- Stadium: RFK Stadium
- MLS: Conference: 1st Overall: 1st
- MLS Cup: Champions
- U.S. Open Cup: Runners-Up
- CONCACAF Champions' Cup: Third place
- Top goalscorer: League: All: Jaime Moreno (16)
Home colors	Away colors	Third colors

The 1997 D.C. United season was the clubs' third year of existence, as well as their second season in Major League Soccer. United successfully defended its MLS Cup title, becoming the first club to win consecutive league championships until the Houston Dynamo in 2007. United also won its first Supporters' Shield as the team with the best regular-season record, earning their first league "double" by winning the regular season and playoffs. The team also finished as runners-up in the 1997 U.S. Open Cup final, played in Indianapolis three days after United won MLS Cup 1997 at its home stadium, RFK Memorial Stadium in Washington, D.C. In international play, United qualified for the 1997 CONCACAF Champions' Cup, which was primarily played in Washington, D.C., and were eliminated in the semifinals by the Los Angeles Galaxy; the team ultimately shared third place with C.D. Guadalajara after a tie in the third-place match.

== Background ==
The 1996 Major League Soccer season was both Major League Soccer and D.C. United's debut season, which resulted in United winning the inaugural MLS Cup championship match.

=== Major League Soccer ===
==== Conference standings ====
Pos	Team	Pld	W	SOW	L	GF	GA	GD	Pts	Qualification
1	D.C. United	32	17	4	11	70	53	+17	55	MLS Cup Playoffs
2	Tampa Bay Mutiny	32	14	3	15	55	60	−5	45	MLS Cup Playoffs
3	Columbus Crew	32	12	3	17	42	41	+1	39	MLS Cup Playoffs
4	New England Revolution	32	11	4	17	40	53	−13	37	MLS Cup Playoffs
5	NY/NJ MetroStars	32	11	2	19	43	53	−10	35	

Source: MLS

==== Overall standings ====
Pos	Team	Pld	W	SOW	L	GF	GA	GD	Pts	Qualification
1	D.C. United (C, S)	32	17	4	11	70	53	+17	55	CONCACAF Champions' Cup
2	Kansas City Wizards	32	14	7	11	57	51	+6	49	
3	Tampa Bay Mutiny	32	14	3	15	55	60	−5	45	
4	Los Angeles Galaxy	32	14	2	16	55	44	+11	44	
5	Dallas Burn	32	13	3	16	55	49	+6	42	
6	Columbus Crew	32	12	3	17	42	41	+1	39	
7	Colorado Rapids	32	12	2	18	50	59	−9	38	CONCACAF Champions' Cup
8	New England Revolution	32	11	4	17	40	53	−13	37	
9	NY/NJ MetroStars	32	11	2	19	43	53	−10	35	
10	San Jose Clash	32	9	3	20	55	59	−4	30	

Source: MLS
Rules for classification: 1) points; 2) head-to-head record; 3) goal difference; 4) number of goals scored
(C) Champions; (S) Supporters' Shield

=== MLS Cup Playoffs ===
==== Bracket ====
- The ties were a best of three series.

Conference Semifinals
1	D.C. United	4	1 (4)	x
4	New England Revolution	1	1 (3)	x
Eastern Conference
2	Tampa Bay Mutiny	1	0	x
3	Columbus Crew	2	2	x
1	Kansas City Wizards	0	2	x
4	Colorado Rapids	3	3	x
Western Conference
2	LA Galaxy	0 (0)	0	x
3	Dallas Burn	0 (2)	3	x

Conference Finals
1	D.C. United	3	1	x
3	Columbus Crew	2	0	x
4	Colorado Rapids	1	2	x
3	Dallas Burn	0	1	x

MLS Cup '97
E	D.C. United	2
W	Colorado Rapids	1

==== Conference semifinals ====
October 5 Game 1	D.C. United	4–1	New England Revolution	Washington, D.C.
	Wegerle 13', 56'; Moreno 65', 76'		Burns 89'	Stadium: RFK Stadium; Attendance: 12,540; Referee: Tim Weyland

October 8 Game 2	New England Revolution	1–1 (a.e.t.) (3–4 SO)	D.C. United	Foxborough, Massachusetts
	Moore 72'	Report	Williams 53'	Stadium: Foxboro Stadium; Attendance: 16,233; Referee: Tim Weyland

D.C. United won the series 2–0.

==== Conference finals ====
October 12 Game 1	D.C. United	3–2	Columbus Crew	Washington, D.C.
	Sanneh 9', 45'; Díaz Arce 29'		Farrell 57'; Dooley 73'	Stadium: RFK Stadium; Attendance: 11,820; Referee: Kevin Terry

October 15 Game 2	D.C. United	1–0	Columbus Crew	Columbus, Ohio
	Díaz Arce 47'			Stadium: Ohio Stadium; Attendance: 9,506; Referee: Arturo Angeles

D.C. United won the series 2–0.

==== MLS Cup ====
October 26 Final	D.C. United	2–1	Colorado Rapids	Washington, D.C.
	Moreno 37'; Sanneh 68'		Paz 75'	Stadium: RFK Stadium; Attendance: 57,431; Referee: Brian Hall

=== U.S. Open Cup ===
August 19, 1997 Quarterfinals	D.C. United (Washington, D.C.)	2–0	(Florida) Tampa Bay Mutiny	Washington, D.C., United States
	Etcheverry 84'; Iroha 89'			Stadium: RFK Stadium

September 3, 1997 Semifinals	San Francisco Bay Seals (California)	1–2	(Washington, D.C.) D.C. United	Stockton, California
	White 84'		Moreno 2' (pen.); Díaz Arce 62'	Stadium: Stagg Memorial Stadium; Attendance: 3,470

October 29, 1997 Final	Dallas Burn (Texas)	0–0 (a.e.t.) (5–3 p)	(Washington, D.C.) D.C. United	Indianapolis
19:00 EDT				Stadium: Carroll Stadium; Attendance: 9,766; Referee: Rich Grady
	Penalties
	Damián (penalty scored); Kreis (penalty scored); Sutter (penalty scored); Peinado (penalty scored); Rodríguez (penalty scored)		(penalty scored) Etcheverry; (penalty missed) Díaz Arce; (penalty scored) Moreno; (penalty scored) Iroha

=== CONCACAF Champions' Cup ===
==== Bracket ====
Quarterfinals
(United States)	D.C. United	1
(Trinidad and Tobago)	United Petrotrin	0
(United States)	LA Galaxy	2
(El Salvador)	Luis Ángel Firpo	0
(Mexico)	Guadalajara	1
(Costa Rica)	Cartaginés	0
(Mexico)	Cruz Azul	5
(Guatemala)	Comunicaciones	0

Semifinals
(United States)	D.C. United	0
(United States)	LA Galaxy	1
(Mexico)	Guadalajara	2
(Mexico)	Cruz Azul	3

Final
(United States)	LA Galaxy	3
(Mexico)	Cruz Azul	5

==== Match results ====
August 12, 1997 Quarterfinals	D.C. United (United States)	1–0	(Trinidad and Tobago) United Petrotrin	Washington, D.C., United States
	Etcheverry 84'	Report		Stadium: RFK Stadium

August 22, 1997 Semifinals	D.C. United (United States)	0–1	(United States) LA Galaxy	Washington, D.C., United States
		Report	Jones 10'	Stadium: RFK Stadium

August 24, 1997 Consolation match	D.C. United (United States)	2–2	(Mexico) Guadalajara	Washington, D.C., United States
	Díaz Arce 40'; Iroha 89'	Report	Acosta 55'; Sánchez 86' (pen.)	Stadium: RFK Stadium
Note: Match stood as a draw

== See also ==
- 1997 in American soccer
- 1997 Major League Soccer season
- List of D.C. United seasons
