= João Luiz =

João Luiz may refer to:

- João Luiz (footballer, born 1971), João Luiz Ferreira Baptista, Brazilian football defender
- João Luiz (footballer, born 1985), João Luiz Ramires Vieira, Brazilian football defensive midfielder
