= Damián Álvarez =

Damián Álvarez might refer to:

- Damián Álvarez (footballer, born 1973), Mexican football forward
- Damián Álvarez (footballer, born 1979), Mexican football winger
