= Jeff Cassar =

American soccer player and coach

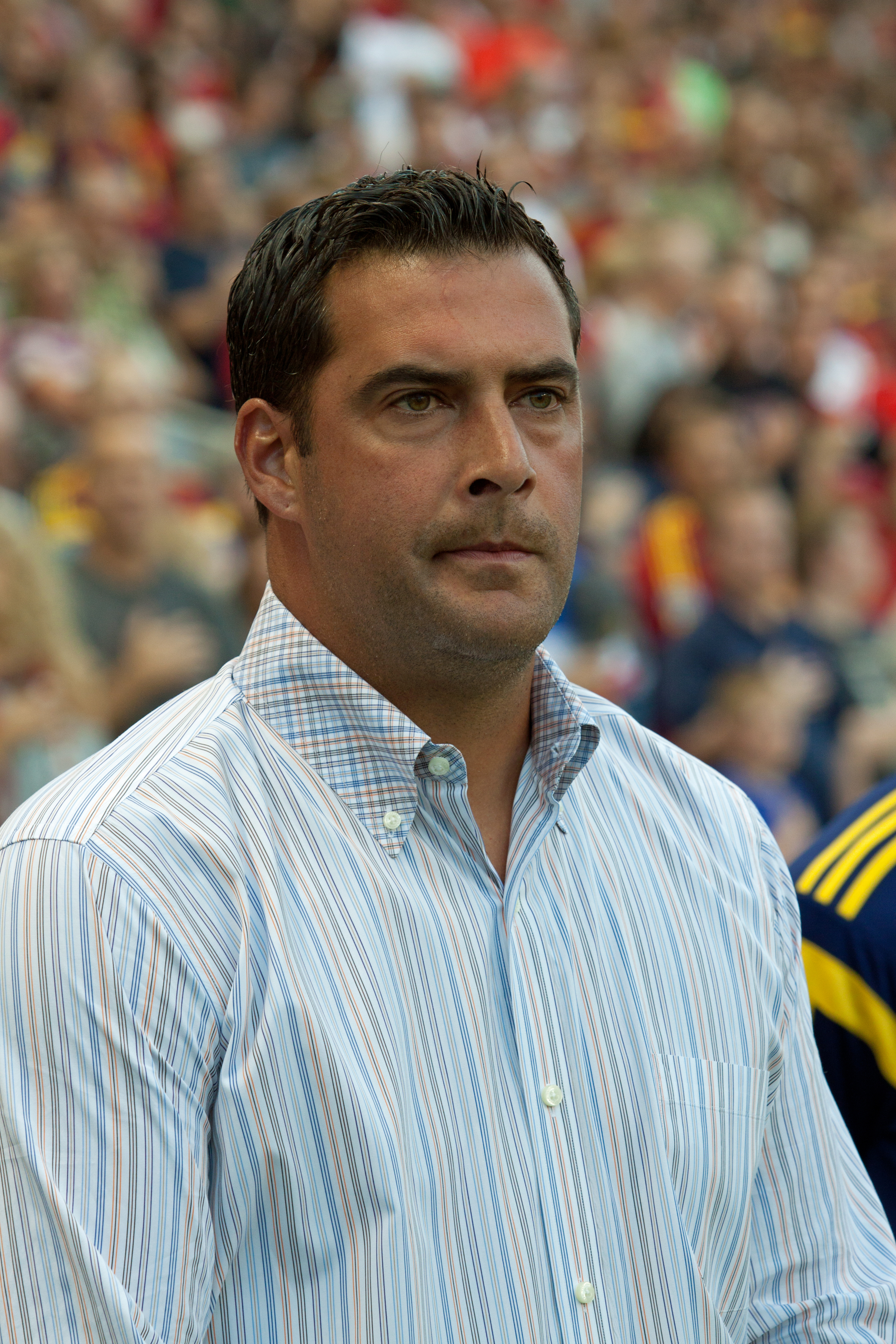

Personal information
- Full name: Jeffrey Cassar
- Date of birth: February 2, 1974 (age 52)
- Place of birth: Livonia, Michigan, United States
- Height: 6 ft 2 in (1.88 m)
- Position: Goalkeeper

College career
| Years | Team | Apps | (Gls) |
| 1992–1995 | FIU Golden Panthers | | |

Senior career*
| Years | Team | Apps | (Gls) |
| 1996–1997 | Dallas Burn | 2 | (0) |
| 1998–2001 | Miami Fusion | 51 | (0) |
| 2002 | Bolton Wanderers | 0 | (0) |
| 2002 | Atlanta Silverbacks | 6 | (0) |
| 2002 | → MetroStars (loan) | 0 | (0) |
| 2003–2006 | FC Dallas | 31 | (0) |
| 2003 | → Charlotte Eagles (loan) | 1 | (0) |

Managerial career
- 2007: FC Dallas (assistant)
- 2007–2013: Real Salt Lake (assistant)
- 2013–2017: Real Salt Lake
- * Club domestic league appearances and goals

Jeff Cassar (born February 2, 1974) is an American soccer coach and former goalkeeper who last coached Real Salt Lake of Major League Soccer.

== Playing career ==
Cassar played college soccer at Florida International University, where he was roommates with Steve Ralston. Following his graduation, he was selected eighth overall in the 1996 MLS College Draft by the Dallas Burn. Although Cassar made the team, Mark Dodd took firm hold of the starting position, and Cassar only appeared in two games that season. After spending all of the 1997 season injured with a torn ACL, Cassar was selected tenth overall in the 1997 MLS Expansion Draft by the Miami Fusion. Cassar started much of the Fusion's inaugural season, appearing in twenty-one games, all starts, and compiling a GAA of 1.95. After splitting starting duties with Garth Lagerway in 1999, Cassar lost his job to Nick Rimando, and would start just ten games for Miami in 2000 and 2001. Upon Miami's contraction at the end of the 2001 season, Cassar was again selected by the Burn in the 2002 MLS Dispersal Draft, but failing to make the team, went looking for work overseas. Cassar found a job as the backup for Bolton Wanderers in England, and would remain with the team from March to June 2002.

Cassar returned to the United States at the end of the English season, and signed with the Atlanta Silverbacks of the A-League, for whom he appeared in six games. Cassar joined Dallas for a third time the next year, signing on as a backup for D.J. Countess following Matt Jordan's departure for Europe. Cassar appeared in seven games for the Burn in 2003, doing a passable, if unexceptional, job for the team. Following the 2003 season, the Burn brought in a new coach, Colin Clarke, who traded away Countess and replaced him with Scott Garlick. Although Garlick began the season as the team's starting goalkeeper, an injury midseason gave Cassar the opportunity to seize the position, which he did with a series of impressive performances; he ended the season as the club's starting goalkeeper, having made nineteen starts.

Following the 2006 season, Cassar retired.

== Coaching ==
Cassar was appointed by new head coach Steve Morrow, Clarke's replacement, as the team's goalkeeper coach. In May 2007, he became the goalkeeper coach for Real Salt Lake. However, he also spent time at the end of the season as an assistant with the Puerto Rico Islanders of the USL First Division.

Jeff was called on as a goalkeeper coach for the U.S. Men's National Team in September 2013 during their world cup qualification bid against Mexico.

On December 18, 2013, Cassar was named the new head coach of Real Salt Lake, replacing Jason Kreis after the latter became head coach of New York City FC.

After serving as the head coach of Real Salt Lake for three full seasons in Major League Soccer, Cassar was dismissed on March 20, 2017, following an 0-2-1 start to the 2017 MLS season. Cassar's assistant coach Daryl Shore was appointed interim head coach on the same day.

Cassar joined the staff of the Dallas Hornets youth club in July 2023.
