= Andrew Lewis (soccer) =

American soccer player

Personal information
- Full name: Andrew R. Lewis
- Date of birth: September 10, 1974 (age 52)
- Place of birth: New Providence, New Jersey, U.S.
- Height: 6 ft 1 in (1.85 m)
- Position: Defender

Youth career
- 1993–1995: Princeton Tigers

Senior career*
| Years | Team | Apps | (Gls) |
| 1997 | MetroStars | 19 | (0) |
| 1998–2001 | Chicago Fire | 54 | (2) |
| 1999 | → MLS Pro-40 (loan) | 10 | (0) |
| 2002–2003 | Charleston Battery | 51 | (0) |
| 2004 | Atlanta Silverbacks | 23 | (0) |
- * Club domestic league appearances and goals

Andrew Lewis (born September 10, 1974) is an American retired soccer defender who played professionally in Major League Soccer.

In 1993, Lewis graduated from the Pingry School. He then played college soccer at Princeton University from 1993 to 1995. He was a 1994 Third Team All American.

In February 1997, the MetroStars selected Lewis in third round (twenty-fifth overall) of the 1997 MLS College Draft. He played nineteen games for the MetroStars. On November 6, 1997, the Chicago Fire selected Lewis with the seventeenth pick of the 1997 MLS Expansion Draft. He spent four injury marred seasons in Chicago, where he was known as "The Bull", before being released on January 15, 2002. On March 22, 2002, he signed with the Charleston Battery of the USL A-League. In 2004, he played for the Atlanta Silverbacks.
