= Billy Clifford (soccer) =

American soccer player

Personal information
- Full name: William Clifford
- Place of birth: Plymouth, Massachusetts, U.S.
- Height: 6 ft 3 in (1.91 m)
- Position: Defender

Youth career
- 1992–1995: South Carolina Gamecocks

Senior career*
Years	Team	Apps	(Gls)
1996	South Carolina Shamrocks		(2)
1997–1998	Jacksonville Cyclones	19	(1)
- * Club domestic league appearances and goals

William Clifford is an American retired professional soccer defender who spent three seasons in the USISL.

== Playing career ==
In 1992, Clifford graduated from Sacred Heart High School. He attended the University of South Carolina, playing on the men's soccer team from 1992 to 1995. In 1996, he turned professional with the South Carolina Shamrocks of the USISL. On February 2, 1997, the Columbus Crew selected Clifford in the third round (twenty-eighth overall) of the 1997 MLS Supplemental Draft. The Crew released him and he moved to the Jacksonville Cyclones for two seasons. In April 1998, Clifford suffered a career ending broken foot during practice.
