= Shawn Boney =

Trinidadian football (born 1971)

Personal information
- Date of birth: 28 August 1971 (age 55)
- Place of birth: Tacarigua, Trinidad and Tobago
- Height: 6 ft 7 in (2.01 m)
- Position: Midfielder

Youth career
- 1993–1994: Mercer County Community College
- 1995–1996: Southern Connecticut State University

Senior career*
Years	Team	Apps	(Gls)
1997–1998	Connecticut Wolves	34	(7)
1997–2000	Cleveland Crunch (indoor)	79	(41)
1999	Staten Island Vipers	7	(0)
1999	Lehigh Valley Steam	15	(2)
2000–2001	Detroit Rockers (indoor)	16	(10)
2001–2007	Philadelphia KiXX (indoor)	151	(74)
2007–2008	Orlando Sharks (indoor)	16	(9)
2008–2009	New Jersey Ironmen (indoor)	12	(3)
2010	Philadelphia KiXX (indoor)	8	(0)
Total		338	(146)

International career
1991	Trinidad U-20		
- Trinidad and Tobago
- * Club domestic league appearances and goals

Shawn Boney (born 28 August 1971) is a Trinidadian football (soccer) midfielder who was a member of the Trinidad and Tobago U-20 national team at the 1991 FIFA World Youth Championship. He spent his professional career in the United States.

Boney began his collegiate career at Mercer County Community College. During his two seasons, he was a 1993 and 1994 NJCAA All American. He then transferred to Southern Connecticut State University where he won the 1995 NCAA Men's Division II Soccer Championship. Boney was a 1996 First Team NCAA Division II All American soccer player. On 20 December 1996, the Cleveland Crunch of the National Professional Soccer League made Boney a second round draft pick. In February 1997, the Los Angeles Galaxy selected Boney in the second round (nineteenth overall) of the 1997 MLS College Draft. The Galaxy released him during the preseason and he signed with the Connecticut Wolves of the USISL A-League. He played the 1997 USISL season with the Wolves, then signed with the Cleveland Crunch on 10 October 1997. At the completion of the 1997–1998 indoor season, Boney returned to the Wolves for the 1998 outdoor season. He rejoined the Crunch in the fall of 1998 and remained with Cleveland through the 1999–2000 season. On 8 August 2000, the Toronto ThunderHawks selected Boney in the NPSL Expansion Draft. The ThunderHawks then sold him to the Detroit Rockers. Boney began the season with Detroit, but was traded to the Philadelphia KiXX in exchange for Domenic Mobilio on 20 February 2001. At the end of the season, the NPSL collapsed and the KiXX moved to the second Major Indoor Soccer League. Boney stayed with the KiXX for six seasons, winning the 2002 and 2007 championships with them. In 2007, the Orlando Sharks selected Boney in the MISL expansion draft. The team went 4–26 and withdrew from the league at the end of the season. On 30 October 2008, the New Jersey Ironmen of the Xtreme Soccer League signed Boney. The Ironmen released him at the end of the season and he did not play until the KiXX signed him mid-way through the 2009–2010 season.
