= Steve Patterson (soccer) =

American soccer player and coach

Personal information
- Full name: Steven Patterson
- Place of birth: United States
- Position: Forward

College career
Years	Team	Apps	(Gls)
1994–1996	Fresno State Bulldogs		

Senior career*
Years	Team	Apps	(Gls)
1997	Colorado Foxes	28	(16)
1998–2000	Orange County Zodiac	75	(35)
2004	Orange County Blue Star	13	(7)

International career
1994	United States U-20		
- * Club domestic league appearances and goals

Steve Patterson is an American retired soccer forward. He is the head coach of the Foothill High School girls’ soccer team.

== Youth ==
In 1994, Patterson graduated from Foothill High School. He attended Fresno State University, playing on the men's soccer team from 1994 to 1996.

== Professional ==
In 1997, Patterson turned professional with the Colorado Foxes of the USISL A-League. He finished the season with sixteen goals, placing him fourth on the league's scoring chart. Patterson was also selected as Second Team All League. At the end of the season, Patterson signed with the Colorado Rapids. On November 6, 1997, the Chicago Fire selected Patterson in the 1997 MLS Expansion Draft. The Fire waived him on March 1, 1998. In 1998, Patterson moved to the Orange County Zodiac where he played until 2000. In 2004, he spent the first half of the season with the Orange County Blue Star.

== International ==
In 1994, Patterson played for the United States U-20 men's national soccer team at the 1995 CONCACAF U-20 Tournament. Patterson and his teammates failed to qualify for the 1995 FIFA World Youth Championship.
