= Danny Care (soccer) =

American soccer player (born 1974)

Personal information
- Full name: Daniel James Care
- Date of birth: June 20, 1974 (age 52)
- Place of birth: Peachtree City, Georgia, U.S.
- Height: 5 ft 11 in (1.80 m)
- Position: Midfielder

College career
Years	Team	Apps	(Gls)
1993–1996	Clemson Tigers		

Senior career*
Years	Team	Apps	(Gls)
1997	Carolina Dynamo	19	(3)
1998	D.C. United	1	(0)
1998	→ Richmond Kickers (loan)		
1998	→ Hampton Roads Mariners (loan)		
1998	→ Project 40 (loan)	20	(0)
1999	Richmond Kickers	1	(0)
1999	Jacksonville Cyclones	13	(1)
2000–2001	Atlanta Silverbacks	54	(2)
- * Club domestic league appearances and goals

Daniel James Care is an American former soccer player who played as a defender.

== Early life ==
In 1993, Care graduated from McIntosh High School where he was part of the 1992 Georgia State High School championship soccer team. He played his club soccer with the Fayette Lightning which also won the 1991, 1992 and 1993 Georgia State championship. He was a 1992 and 1993 NSCAA High School All American soccer player. Care attended Clemson University, playing on the men's soccer team from 1993 to 1996. He was a 1996 Third Team All American. He graduated with a bachelor's degree in business management.

== Career ==
On February 1, 1997, D.C. United selected Care in the first round (eleventh overall) of the 1997 MLS College Draft. On February 6, 1997, the Richmond Kickers selected Care in the second round of the USISL A-League draft. Care did not join D.C. for its pre-season training camp in order to complete his degree. Therefore, he then signed with the Carolina Dynamo on May 1, 1997. In February 1998, United drafted Care for a second time when they took him in the first round (ninth overall) of the 1998 MLS Supplemental Draft. D.C. sent Care on loan to the Richmond Kickers, Hampton Roads Mariners and Project 40 during the season. He saw time in only one first team game before being waived on November 2, 1998. However, he was on the bench for United when they defeated Vasco da Gama in the 1998 Copa Interamericana. In March 1999, Care signed with the Richmond Kickers but was sent to the Jacksonville Cyclones early in the season. In May 2000, he signed with the Atlanta Silverbacks. He spent two seasons with the Silverbacks before being released in February 2002.
