= Brian Bates (soccer) =

American soccer player (born 1972)

Personal information
- Date of birth: August 16, 1972 (age 54)
- Place of birth: Woodbridge, Virginia, U.S.
- Height: 6 ft 1 in (1.85 m)
- Position: Defender

College career
Years	Team	Apps	(Gls)
1990–1993	Virginia Cavaliers		

Senior career*
Years	Team	Apps	(Gls)
1994–1995	Richmond Kickers		
1996–1997	Colorado Rapids	30	(0)
1998	Chicago Fire	2	(0)
1998	Dallas Burn	4	(0)
1998	→ MLS Pro 40 (loan)	1	(0)
1999	D.C. United	1	(0)
1999	Maryland Mania	4	(0)
1999	Charleston Battery	5	(0)

International career
1988–1989	United States U16		
1989–1990	United States U20		
- * Club domestic league appearances and goals

Brian Bates (born August 16, 1972) is an American retired soccer defender who spent four seasons in Major League Soccer and three in the USISL.

== Club career ==
Bates attended the University of Virginia, playing on the men's soccer team from 1990 to 1993. Bates and his teammates won the 1991, 1992 and 1993 NCAA Men's Soccer Championship. In 1994, he signed with the Richmond Kickers of the USISL. In 1995, the Kickers won both the league and Open Cup titles, giving Bates a double. On February 6, 1996, the Colorado Rapids selected Bates in the fourth round (thirty-second overall) in the 1996 MLS Inaugural Player Draft. On November 6, 1997, the Chicago Fire selected Bates with the 19th pick in the 1997 MLS Expansion Draft. He played two games for Chicago before being traded to the Dallas Burn for Tom Soehn. On January 16, 1999, the Dallas Burn traded Bates to D.C. United for a second round pick in the 1999 MLS College Draft. Bates played one game for D.C. before being placed on waivers on May 13, 1999. He moved to the Maryland Mania of the USISL for four games before signing with the Charleston Battery for the remainder of the season.

== National team ==
In 1989, he was a member of the U.S. U-16 national team at the 1989 FIFA U-16 World Championship. Although the U.S. defeated Brazil its first game, the team finished group play with a 1-1-1 record, and failed to qualify for the second round. Following the tournament, Bates played several games with the U.S. U-20 national team in 1989 and 1990.
