= Randy Dedini =

American soccer player (born 1970)

Personal information
- Date of birth: January 7, 1970 (age 56)
- Place of birth: Vacaville, California, U.S.
- Height: 6 ft 3 in (1.91 m)
- Position: Goalkeeper

College career
Years	Team	Apps	(Gls)
1990–1991	American River Beavers		
1992–1993	Sonoma State Seawolves		

Senior career*
Years	Team	Apps	(Gls)
1994	North Bay Breakers	15	(0)
1995–1996	Chico Rooks		
1997–1998	Nashville Metros	52	(0)
1998	→ Los Angeles Galaxy (loan)	0	(0)
1999–2003	Pittsburgh Riverhounds	113	(0)
1999	→ Colorado Rapids (loan)	0	(0)
1999	→ Kansas City Wizards (loan)	0	(0)
2000	→ Colorado Rapids (loan)	0	(0)
2001	→ New England Revolution (loan)	0	(0)
2001	→ Dallas Burn (loan)	0	(0)

Managerial career
- 2004–2006: Sacramento State (assistant)
- 2007–2025: Sacramento State
- * Club domestic league appearances and goals

Randy Dedini (born January 7, 1970) is an American retired soccer goalkeeper who played professionally in the USL A-League. He was the head coach of the Sacramento State women's soccer team.

== Playing career ==
=== Youth ===
In 1988, Dedini graduated from Vacaville High School. He began his collegiate career at American River College for two years before transferring to Sonoma State. He played at Sonoma in 1992 and 1993, being named a 1993 Division II Second Team All American. Dedini graduated with a bachelor's degree in kinesiology and was inducted into the school's Athletic Hall of Fame in 2008.

=== Professional ===
In 1994, Dedini turned professional with the North Bay Breakers of the USISL. In 1995, Dedini moved to the Chico Rooks. The San Jose Clash signed Dedini during the 1996 pre-season but released him before the first game of the season. He returned to the Rooks where he was 1996 All League. In 1997, Dedini joined the Nashville Metros where he played through the 1998 season. In 1998, the Los Angeles Galaxy called Dedini up as a backup. In 1999, Dedini signed with the Pittsburgh Riverhounds where he remained until his retirement in 2003. Over his five years in Pittsburgh, Dedini was called up several times by Major League Soccer teams, but never entered a game. In July 1999, the Colorado Rapids called Dedini up for two games. He also spent time that season with the Kansas City Wizards. On June 30, 2000, the Rapids brought Dedini up for one game. In 2001, he spent time with the New England Revolution and the Dallas Burn.

== Coaching career ==
From 1997 to 2002, Dedini served as an assistant coach with the Quaker Valley High School boys' soccer team. In 2004, he became an assistant (goalkeeper) coach with Sacramento State women's soccer team. In 2005, he became a full assistant. On February 2, 2007, Dedini replaced Katie Poynter as head coach. He was the 2007 and 2010 Big Sky Conference Coach of the Year.
