= Aidan Heaney =

English footballer & coach (born 1969)

Personal information
- Date of birth: 9 August 1969 (age 57)
- Place of birth: Newcastle upon Tyne, England
- Height: 6 ft 0 in (1.83 m)
- Position: Goalkeeper

Team information
- Current team: UNC Wilmington (manager)

College career
Years	Team	Apps	(Gls)
1991–1992	Charlotte 49ers		

Senior career*
Years	Team	Apps	(Gls)
1993–1995	Greensboro Dynamo	65	(0)
1996	New England Revolution	19	(0)

Managerial career
- 1999–2000: Appalachian State Mountaineers
- 2001–: UNC Wilmington Seahawks
- * Club domestic league appearances and goals

Aidan Heaney (born 9 August 1969) is an English retired football player and coach. He played in Major League Soccer (MLS) in 1996 with the New England Revolution. He had formerly played in Germany and for the Greensboro Dynamo, where he was inducted into the Hall of Fame in 2006.

While with the Revolution, Heaney recorded the first clean sheet in club history, on 20 April 1996, in the team's first-ever win, a 1–0 victory over the MetroStars.

Heaney was given a red card in the third minute of a match against the Colorado Rapids on 25 May 1996. This stood as the MLS record for fastest ejection from a match for almost thirteen years, until Carlos Johnson established the new mark after being expelled two minutes into a New York Red Bulls 1–0 loss to the Kansas City Wizards at CommunityAmerica Ballpark on 23 April 2009.
