= 1997 U.S. Open Cup =

Tournament details
- Country: United States
- Teams: 32

Final positions
- Champions: Dallas Burn (1st title)
- Runners-up: D.C. United

Tournament statistics
- Top goal scorer(s): Marquis White (6 goals)

The 1997 U.S. Open Cup ran from June through October 1997, open to all soccer teams in the United States.

Major League Soccer club Dallas Burn prevailed over defending-champion D.C. United, winning 5–3 on penalty kicks after battling to a scoreless draw through extra time. The match was played at Carroll Stadium at IUPUI in Indianapolis, Indiana.

== Schedule ==
Schedule for 1997 U.S. Open Cup
Round	Match day	Entrants	Teams entered to date
First round	June 18–26	8 USISL D-3 Pro League teams 4 Premier Development League teams 4 USASA teams	16 teams
Second round	July 1–13	8 winners from first round 8 USISL A-League teams	24 teams
Third round	July 23 – August 6	8 winners from second round 8 Major League Soccer teams	32 teams
Quarterfinals	August 10–26	8 winners from third round	32 teams
Semifinals	September 2–3	4 winners from quarterfinals	32 teams
Final	October 29	2 winners from semifinals	32 teams

== First round ==
Eight D3 Pro, four PDL, and four USASA clubs start.

June 18, 1997	Austin Lone Stars (D3 Pro)	4–2	Tucson Amigos (PDL)	Austin, Texas
	Jones 37', 38', 62'; Johnson 80'	Report	Arias 15'; Paylor 72'	Stadium: Nelson Field; Attendance: 627

June 20, 1997	Central Coast Roadrunners (PDL)	4–2	Albuquerque Geckos (D3 Pro)	San Luis Obispo, California
				Stadium: Mustang Stadium

June 20, 1997	San Jose Inter SC (USASA)	0–4	San Francisco Bay Seals (D3 Pro)	Cupertino, California
		Report	White; Black	Stadium: De Anza College

June 24, 1997	Wilmington Hammerheads (D3 Pro)	2–3	Mid-Michigan Bucks (PDL)	Wilmington, North Carolina
				Stadium: Emsley A. Laney High School

June 24, 1997	Chicago Stingers (D3 Pro)	2–0	Mequon United (USASA)	Arlington Heights, Illinois
	Muir 58'; Hamnett 80'	Report		Stadium: Forest View Park; Attendance: 1,200

June 25, 1997	Philadelphia Freedom (D3 Pro)	1–1 (5–4 p)	Lincoln Brigade (PDL)	Newtown Square, Pennsylvania
	Chrisanthon 90'	Report	70'	Stadium: Marple Newtown Stadium

June 25, 1997	Los Lobos (USASA)	0–1	Central Jersey Riptide (D3 Pro)	Tulsa, Oklahoma
				Stadium: Metro Christian Academy

June 26, 1997	Rhode Island Stingrays (D3 Pro)	2–3	Bridgeport Italians (USASA)	East Providence, Rhode Island
	Hanseni; Rocha	Report	Jurkonsk; Venditti; Zuniga	Stadium: Pierce Memorial Stadium

== Second round ==
Eight A-League clubs enter.

July 1, 1997	Austin Lone Stars (D3 Pro)	0–1 (a.e.t.)	New Orleans Riverboat Gamblers (A-League)	Austin, Texas
	Champ (yellow card) 30'	Report	Restrepo (yellow card) 28'; Brown (yellow card) 30'; Trotman 108'	Stadium: Nelson Field; Attendance: 1,427

July 2, 1997	Richmond Kickers (A-League)	6–1	Philadelphia Freedom (D3 Pro)	Richmond, Virginia
	Echeverry 6', 68'; Adu-Gyamfi 38'; Borgard 46'; Ukrop 66', 82'	Report	Cline 11'	Stadium: City Stadium; Attendance: 1,433; Referee: Abbas Piran

July 7, 1997	Central Coast Roadrunners (PDL)	3–2 (a.e.t.)	California Jaguars (A-League)	Arroyo Grande, California
	Harty 1', 69'; Gutierrez 103'	Report	Mann 13'; Watson 35'	Stadium: Hitchen Stadium; Attendance: 1,200

July 8, 1997	Rochester Raging Rhinos (A-League)	3–2 (a.e.t.)	Mid-Michigan Bucks (PDL)	Hershey, Pennsylvania
	Tanner 10'; Glenn 40', 100'	Report	Rawlins 38'; Snape 74'	Stadium: Hersheypark Stadium; Attendance: 616

July 8, 1997	Hershey Wildcats (A-League)	4–1	Central Jersey Riptide (D3 Pro)	Hershey, Pennsylvania
	Johnson 14'; Zorić 20'; Tschantret 65'; Feniger 79'	Report	Ozrek 62'	Stadium: Hersheypark Stadium; Attendance: 616

July 8, 1997	Chicago Stingers (D3 Pro)	3–0	Orlando Sundogs (A-League)	Arlington Heights, Illinois
	Deck 3'; Jahr 29'; Wolf 84'	Report		Stadium: Forest View Park; Attendance: 300

July 8, 1997	San Francisco Bay Seals (D3 Pro)	1–0	Seattle Sounders (A-League)	San Francisco, California
	White 43'	Report	Aunger (yellow card); Hoggan (yellow card)	Stadium: Negoesco Stadium; Attendance: 612

July 13, 1997	Long Island Rough Riders (A-League)	1–0	Bridgeport Italians (USASA)	Garden City, New York
	Inneh 8'	Report		Stadium: Adelphi University; Attendance: 1,006

== Third round ==
Eight MLS clubs enter.

23 July 1997	Richmond Kickers (A-League)	0–3	New York/New Jersey MetroStars (MLS)	Richmond, Virginia
			Bartlett 66' 78'; Joseph 80'	Stadium: City Stadium; Attendance: 2,751

24 July 1997	San Francisco Bay Seals (D3 Pro)	2–1	Kansas City Wizards (MLS)	San Francisco, California
	White 1', 59'	Report	Klopas 40'	Stadium: Negoesco Stadium; Attendance: 1,400

27 July 1997	Central Coast Roadrunners (PDL)	2–5	San Jose Clash (MLS)	San Luis Obispo, California
			Lozzano 26', 81'; Zico 44'; Baicher 75'; Cerritos 83'	Stadium: Mustang Stadium; Attendance: 7,112

29 July 1997	New Orleans Riverboat Gamblers (A-League)	0–3	Dallas Burn (MLS)	Metairie, Louisiana
		Report	Kreis 39'; Santel 70'; Elliott 74'	Stadium: Zephyr Field; Attendance: 6,269

30 July 1997	Chicago Stingers (D3 Pro)	2–1	Colorado Rapids (MLS)	Arlington Heights, Illinois
	Hamnett 43'; Wolff 46'	Report	Henderson 55'	Stadium: The Hive at Forest View Park; Attendance: 7,430

1 August 1997	New England Revolution (MLS)	3–4 (a.s.d.e.t.)	Long Island Rough Riders (A-League)	New Britain, Connecticut
	Kerr 9'; Sawatzky 19'; Moore 59'	Report	Rinker 43'; Rooney 74', 79'; Mohammed 108'	Stadium: Willow Brook Park; Attendance: 2,031; Referee: Ruben Rodhas

1 August 1997	Rochester Raging Rhinos (A-League)	0–1	Tampa Bay Mutiny (MLS)	Rochester, New York
		Report	Gilmar 79'	Stadium: Frontier Field; Attendance: 8,781

6 August 1997	Hershey Wildcats (A-League)	0–0 (2–3 p)	D.C. United (MLS)	Hershey, Pennsylvania
				Stadium: Hersheypark; Attendance: 5,921

== Quarterfinals ==
10 August 1997	Chicago Stingers (D3 Pro)	1-4	Dallas Burn (MLS)	Arlington Heights, Illinois
	Deck 63'	Report	Álvarez 41'; Washington 43'; Eck 69', 84'	Stadium: The Hive at Forest View Park; Attendance: 3,810

19 August 1997	D.C. United (MLS)	2-0	Tampa Bay Mutiny (MLS)	Washington, D.C.
	Etcheverry 84'; Iroha 89'			Stadium: RFK Stadium; Attendance: 3,527

20 August 1997	San Jose Clash (MLS)	1-2	San Francisco Bay Seals (D3 Pro)	San Jose, California
	Cerritos 19'	Report	Simpson 77'; Watkins 86'	Stadium: Spartan Stadium; Attendance: 4,327

26 August 1997	Long Island Rough Riders (A-League)	0-1 (asdet)	New York/New Jersey MetroStars (MLS)	Stony Brook, New York
			Harty 105'	Stadium: SUNY Stony Brook Stadium; Attendance: 1,250

== Semifinals ==
2 September 1997	Dallas Burn (MLS)	2–1 (asdet)	New York/New Jersey MetroStars (MLS)	New York, New York
	Damian 17'; Jorge Flores 103'	(Report)	Branco 85'	Stadium: Baker Field; Attendance: 1,201; Referee: Rich Grady (USA)

3 September 1997	San Francisco Bay Seals (D3 Pro)	1–2	D.C. United (MLS)	Stockton, California
	Marquis White 84'	(Report)	Jaime Moreno 2' (pen); Raúl Díaz Arce 62'	Stadium: Stagg Memorial Stadium; Attendance: 3,470; Referee: -- (USA)

== Final ==
The final was originally scheduled to be played in the first week of September, but congestion in the MLS schedule forced it to be delayed into October after the MLS Cup final.

October 29, 1997

Dallas Burn (MLS)	0–0 (ASDET)	D.C. United (MLS)
	(Report)
Penalties
Damian (penalty scored); Jason Kreis (penalty scored); Alain Sutter (penalty scored); Daniel Peinado (penalty scored); Jorge Rodríguez (penalty scored)	5–3	Marco Etcheverry (penalty scored); Raúl Díaz Arce (penalty missed); Jaime Moreno (penalty scored); Ben Iroha (penalty scored)

Carroll Stadium at IUPUI
Indianapolis
Attendance: 9,766
Referee: Rich Grady (USA)

Dallas Burn	D.C. United

== Bracket ==
Home teams listed on top of bracket

Third Round
MLS	New England Revolution	3
A-L	Long Island Roughriders (ASDET)	4
A-L	Richmond Kickers	0
MLS	MetroStars	3
D3P	Chicago Stingers	2
MLS	Colorado Rapids	1
A-L	New Orleans Riverboat Gamblers	0
MLS	Dallas Burn	3
D3P	S.F. Bay Seals	2
MLS	Kansas City Wizards	1
PDL	Central Coast Roadrunners	2
MLS	San Jose Clash	5
A-L	Hershey Wildcats	0 (2)
MLS	D.C. United (ASDET, PSO)	0 (3)
A-L	Rochester Rhinos	0
MLS	Tampa Bay Mutiny	1

Quarterfinals
A-L	Long Island Roughriders	0
MLS	MetroStars (ASDET)	1
D3P	Chicago Stingers	1
MLS	Dallas Burn	4
D3P	S.F. Bay Seals	2
MLS	San Jose Clash	1
MLS	D.C. United	2
MLS	Tampa Bay Mutiny	0

Semifinals
MLS	MetroStars	1
MLS	Dallas Burn (ASDET)	2
D3P	S.F. Bay Seals	1
MLS	D.C. United	2

Finals
MLS	Dallas Burn (ASDET, PSO)	0 (5)
MLS	D.C. United	0 (3)

== Top scorers ==
Rank	Player	Club	Goals
1	Marquis White	San Francisco Bay Seals	6
2	Gabe Jones	Austin Lone Stars	3

== See also ==
- United States Soccer Federation
- Lamar Hunt U.S. Open Cup
- Major League Soccer
- United Soccer Leagues
- USASA
- National Premier Soccer League
- 1997 National Amateur Cup
