= Scott Budnick (soccer) =

American soccer coach (born 1971)

Personal information
- Full name: Scott D. Budnick
- Date of birth: October 28, 1971 (age 55)
- Place of birth: Wichita, Kansas, U.S.
- Height: 6 ft 2 in (1.88 m)
- Position: Goalkeeper

College career
Years	Team	Apps	(Gls)
1989–1993	William & Mary Tribe		

Senior career*
Years	Team	Apps	(Gls)
1993	Richmond Kickers		
1994	Hampton Roads Hurricanes		
1995	SSV Vorsfelde		
1996–1997	Tampa Bay Mutiny	13	(0)
1998–1999	Miami Fusion	3	(0)
2000	New England Revolution	0	(0)

International career
1989–1990	U.S. U-20		

Managerial career
- 2009–2010: Louisville Lightning
- * Club domestic league appearances and goals

Scott Budnick (born October 28, 1971) is an American soccer coach who is currently the head goalkeeping coach at Louisville City FC. Budnick is an American retired soccer goalkeeper who played two seasons in Major League Soccer and one in the USISL.

== Player ==
=== Youth ===
Budnick attended the College of William and Mary where he played on the men's soccer team from 1989 to 1993. During his four-year career with the Tribe, Budnick was a two-time NSCAA All-South Atlantic Region selection and a three-time All-CAA choice. He enjoyed his finest season as a senior in 1992, leading the Tribe to the second round of the NCAA Tournament. That year, he posted a 0.88 goals against average and seven shutouts. He was named the 1992 William and Mary Tribe Club Senior Male Athlete of the Year. He graduated with a bachelor's degree in 1993.

=== Professional ===
In 1993, Budnick played for the Richmond Kickers in the USISL. In 1994, he played for the expansion Hampton Roads Hurricanes in 1994. In 1995, he pursued an overseas career with SSV Vorsfelde in Germany. In February 1996, the Tampa Bay Mutiny selected Budnick in the 14th round (137th overall) of the 1996 MLS Inaugural Player Draft. He spent two seasons with the Mutiny, playing thirteen regular season games. In 1998, the Miami Fusion selected him in the second round of the Expansion Draft. He played three games in 1998, but spent the entire 1999 season on the injured list. The Fusion waived him in February 2000 and he was picked up by the New England Revolution, but was released in the pre-season.

=== International ===
Budnick played several games with the United States U-20 men's national soccer team in 1989 and 1990 as a backup to Kasey Keller.

== Coach ==
Budnick has worked as an assistant coach with Assumption High School. In 2009, the Louisville Lightning of the Professional Arena Soccer League hired Budnick as its head coach. He held the position for one season, winning Coach of the Year honors. He returned briefly in 2011 to coach the Lightning. He also began coaching at Trinity High School as a goalkeeper coach starting in 2015 and is still coaching there now.

== Lawyer ==
In 2001, he received his M.B.A. from Florida Atlantic University and his J.D. from the Nova Southeastern University in 2004. He currently works for Dinsmore & Shohl, LLP, in Louisville, Kentucky.
