= Marquis White =

American soccer player (born 1969)

Personal information
- Date of birth: April 30, 1969 (age 57)
- Place of birth: San Rafael, California, United States
- Height: 5 ft 7 in (1.70 m)
- Position: Forward

College career
Years	Team	Apps	(Gls)
1986–1990	San Francisco Dons		

Senior career*
Years	Team	Apps	(Gls)
1992	SV Hatert		
1993	NEC Nijmegen		
1994	Tahuichi Academy		
1995	Club Destroyers		
1996	New England Revolution	0	(0)
1996–1997	San Francisco Bay Seals		
1998–1999	Colorado Rapids	42	(4)
1999	→ San Francisco Bay Seals (loan)	3	(0)
1999	→ MLS Pro 40 (loan)	2	(1)
2000	Bay Area Seals	27	(5)
2001–2002	San Francisco Glens		
2003	San Francisco Italians		

Managerial career
- 2002–2005: St. Mary's College (assistant)
- * Club domestic league appearances and goals

Marquis White (born April 30, 1969) is an American former professional soccer player who played as a forward in the Netherlands, Bolivia and the United States. He played two seasons in Major League Soccer, two in the USISL and one in the USL A-League. He teaches high school and is the Technical Director of the Diablo F.C. youth club.

== Youth ==
White grew up in Marin County, California, attending Terra Linda High School. He then attended the University of San Francisco, playing on the men's soccer team from 1986 to 1990. He graduated with a bachelor's degree in sports administration.

== Playing career ==
In 1992, White moved to the Netherlands where he played for the amateur SV Hatert. In 1993, he trained with NEC Nijmegen. In 1994, he moved to Bolivia and trained with the Tahuichi Academy. In 1995, he spent one season with the Bolivian First Division Club Destroyers. In February 1996, the New England Revolution picked White in the fourth round (35th overall) of the 1996 MLS Inaugural Player Draft. He was hampered by injuries during the preseason and the Revs released him on April 15, 1996. White returned to the San Francisco area where he signed with San Francisco Bay Seals of USISL, but he was forced to sit out most of the 1996 season due to the injuries. In 1997, he spent two seasons with the Seals which included the team's run to the semifinals of the 1997 U.S. Open Cup where the team fell to D.C. United, despite a second half goal from White. In March 1998, the Colorado Rapids selected White in the first round (4th overall) of the 1998 MLS Supplemental Draft. He played forty-two games over the next two seasons, but spent some of 1999 on loan to the Seals. On November 25, 1999, the Rapids waived White. In 2000, he returned to the Seals, now playing in the USL A-League. The Seals folded at the end of the season and White retired from playing professionally to devote himself to his coaching career. However, he continued to play on a semi-professional basis with the San Francisco Glens of the San Francisco Soccer Football League Major League in 2001 and 2002. In 2003, he moved to San Francisco Italian A.C.

== Coaching career ==
White has held numerous coaching positions beginning with the San Ramon Valley High School junior varsity team in 1997. He then coached the De La Salle High School varsity team from 2000 to 2002. That year, he entered St.Mary's College where he gained his teaching credentials. While studying for his degree, he also served as an assistant coach with the men's soccer team. He is the Diablo FC Technical Director and a teacher at Heritage High School.
