= Scott Garlick =

American soccer player (born 1972)

Personal information
- Full name: Scott Garlick
- Date of birth: May 29, 1972 (age 54)
- Place of birth: Phoenix, Arizona, United States
- Height: 6 ft 2 in (1.88 m)
- Position: Goalkeeper

College career
Years	Team	Apps	(Gls)
1991–94	San Diego Toreros		

Senior career*
Years	Team	Apps	(Gls)
1994–1996	Waterford United		
1996–1997	Greensboro Dynamo	26	(0)
1997–1998	D.C. United	44	(0)
1999–2001	Tampa Bay Mutiny	78	(0)
2001–2003	Colorado Rapids	53	(0)
2004–2005	FC Dallas	42	(0)
2006	Real Salt Lake	31	(0)
Total		274	(0)
- * Club domestic league appearances and goals as of 31 December 2006 ‡ National team caps and goals as of 31 December 2006

Scott Garlick (born May 29, 1972, in Phoenix, Arizona) is an American retired soccer goalkeeper who played 10 seasons in Major League Soccer from 1997 to 2006.

Garlick went on trial to Waterford United in 1994. Initially for a month he stayed for two seasons before returning home in the hope of signing for a MLS club.

Garlick was not initially drafted by an MLS team; instead, he signed with the Greensboro Dynamo of the USISL. D.C. United called him up early in the 1997 MLS season, and then signed him for good later in the year. Garlick promptly backstopped DC to the MLS Cup, but the emergence of Tom Presthus led United to trade Garlick to the Tampa Bay Mutiny prior to the 1999 season.

Garlick spent two and a half seasons in Tampa, until he was traded to the Colorado Rapids in a deal that saw him packaged with Carlos Valderrama. He left Tampa as the team's all-time leader in most goalkeeping categories. He recorded 184 saves in the year 2000, an MLS single-season record that still stands today.

Garlick spent two and a half seasons with the Rapids as well, but the arrival of Joe Cannon and Scott's subsequent controversial benching for the 2003 playoffs opened the door for his departure. He was traded to the Dallas Burn prior to the 2004 season. Although Garlick began the season as the starter, he lost his job to Jeff Cassar down the stretch. He was traded to Real Salt Lake at the conclusion of the 2005 season.

Garlick is a graduate of Brophy College Preparatory in Phoenix.

In late February 2007 Garlick retired from soccer. In March 2007, he joined Cushman and Wakefield as a Senior Director of tenant representation.

== Honors ==
Individual

- MLS All-Star: 2000
