= Ike Udeh =

Nigerian footballer

Personal information
- Date of birth: September 6, 1973 (age 53)
- Place of birth: Nigeria
- Height: 5 ft 4 in (1.63 m)
- Position: Striker

Youth career
- 1993–1996: Alabama A&M

Senior career*
Years	Team	Apps	(Gls)
1997	Kansas City Wizards	0	(0)
1998	Jacksonville Cyclones	8	(0)

International career
- Nigeria U17
- * Club domestic league appearances and goals

Ike Udeh is a retired Nigerian football (soccer) striker who played one season in Major League Soccer and one in the USISL.

Udeh played on both the Nigerian U-17 and U-21 teams before moving to the United States to attend Alabama A&M. On February 1, 1997, the Kansas City Wizards selected Udeh in the second round (seventeenth overall) of the 1997 MLS College Draft. The Wizards waived him on June 17, 1997. In July, he signed with the Carolina Dynamo. but an automobile accident left him severely injured. and he spent nine months in rehabilitation during which he earned his master's degree from Alabama A&M. In May 1998, he joined the Jacksonville Cyclones of the USISL.

Udeh has an extensive resume of coaching high school soccer teams in Alabama.
