= 1997 MLS College Draft =

College draft for soccer teams

The 1997 Major League Soccer College Draft was held on February 1 and 2, 1997 in Fort Lauderdale, Florida. The draft took place in conjunction with the Umbro Select College All-Star Classic. The first round of the draft took place at halftime of the game and was broadcast live by Prime Sports. The second and third rounds of the draft took place February 2, 1997, beginning at 9:00 a.m. EST in the Fort Lauderdale Airport Hilton. The 1997 MLS Supplemental Draft took place on the afternoon of February 2.

| * | Denotes player who has been selected for an MLS Best XI team |

== Round 1 ==
| Pick # | MLS team | Player | Position | College |
|---|---|---|---|---|
| 1 | Colorado Rapids | Tahj Jakins | D | UCLA |
| 2 | Tampa Bay Mutiny (Note: #2: New England Revolution → Tampa Bay Mutiny. 5 November 1996: Tampa Bay Mutiny acquired this first-round pick from New England Revolution in exchange for New England signing head coach Thomas Rongen.) | Mike Fisher | M | University of Virginia |
| 3 | Columbus Crew | Rob Jachym | M | University of Hartford |
| 4 | San Jose Clash | Alberto Montoya | M | Santa Clara University |
| 5 | New York/New Jersey MetroStars | Brian Kelly | M | Duke University |
| 6 | Dallas Burn | Temoc Suarez | F | University of North Carolina |
| 7 | Kansas City Wizards | Brian Johnson | M | Fresno State |
| 8 | Tampa Bay Mutiny | Mike Mekelburg | M | University of South Florida |
| 9 | Los Angeles Galaxy | Steve Jolley | M | William & Mary College |
| 10 | D.C. United | Danny Care | D | Clemson University |

== Round 2 ==
| Pick # | MLS team | Player | Position | Affiliation |
|---|---|---|---|---|
| 11 | Colorado Rapids | Ross Paule | M | Creighton University |
| 12 | New England Revolution | Scott Coufal | GK | Indiana University |
| 13 | Columbus Crew | John Smith | F | Rollins College |
| 14 | San Jose Clash | Jason Annicchero | D | Santa Clara University |
| 15 | New York/New Jersey MetroStars | Will Kohler | M | Harvard University |
| 16 | Dallas Burn | Alan Branigan | D | Rutgers University |
| 17 | Kansas City Wizards | Ike Udeh | F | Alabama A&M |
| 18 | Tampa Bay Mutiny | PASS | | |
| 19 | Los Angeles Galaxy | Shawn Boney | M | Southern Connecticut State |
| 20 | D.C. United | Tom Presthus | GK | Southern Methodist University |

=== Round 2 trades ===
No trades reported.

== Round 3 ==
| Pick # | MLS team | Player | Position | Affiliation |
|---|---|---|---|---|
| 21 | Colorado Rapids | Mike Feniger | F | East Stroudsburg |
| 22 | New England Revolution | Steve Klein | M | Bowling Green State University |
| 23 | Columbus Crew | Todd DeNault | F | University of South Florida |
| 24 | San Jose Clash | Chris McDonald | M | University of San Francisco |
| 25 | New York/New Jersey MetroStars | Andrew Lewis | D | Princeton University |
| 26 | New England Revolution (Note: #26: Dallas Burn → New England Revolution. 2 February 1997: New England Revolution acquired this third-round pick and a first-round selection (#3) in the 1997 MLS Supplemental Draft from Dallas Burn in exchange for a first-round selection (#2) in the 1997 Supplemental Draft.) | J.T. Roberts | M | Northern Kentucky University |
| 27 | Kansas City Wizards | Jake Joy | M | Midwestern State University |
| 28 | Tampa Bay Mutiny | Musa Shannon | F | Robert Morris University |
| 29 | Los Angeles Galaxy | Kevin Hartman | GK | UCLA |
| 30 | D.C. United | Brandon Leib | D | Georgetown University |
