= Rob Jachym =

Polish footballer

Personal information
- Full name: Robert Jachym
- Date of birth: October 28, 1974 (age 52)
- Place of birth: Mielec, Poland
- Height: 6 ft 0 in (1.83 m)
- Position: Forward

Youth career
- 1992–1996: Hartford Hawks

Senior career*
| Years | Team | Apps | (Gls) |
| 1997 | Columbus Crew | 3 | (0) |
| 1997 | → Milwaukee Rampage (loan) | 2 | (0) |
| 1997–1998 | New England Revolution | 0 | (0) |
| 1997 | → Worcester Wildfire (loan) | 1 | (0) |
| 1997 | → Connecticut Wolves (loan) | 1 | (0) |
| 1998 | → Connecticut Wolves (loan) | 1 | (2) |
| 1998 | → New Hampshire Phantoms (loan) | | |
| 1998 | Worcester Wildfire | 17 | (6) |
| 1999–2004 | Western Mass Pioneers | 90 | (55) |
- * Club domestic league appearances and goals

Robert Jachym (born October 28, 1974) is a Polish-American former professional soccer player who played as a forward. He played professionally in Major League Soccer and USISL, and was the 2003 USL D3 Pro League MVP.

== Player ==
=== The Early Days ===
Born in Poland, Jachym moved to the United States with his family when he was five. He graduated from Francis T Maloney High School after being named a 1991 First Team High School All American soccer player. He then attended University of Hartford where he was a 1996 Second Team All American soccer player. Jachym played five seasons with the Hawks, losing his junior season to injury. As a result, he graduated with a bachelor's degree in marketing in 1996 and a master's degree in finance in 1997. In 2004, Hartford inducted Jachym into its Athletic Hall of Fame.

=== Professional ===
In February 1997, the Columbus Crew selected Jachym in the first round (third overall) of the 1997 MLS College Draft and Jachym signed with them. He then signed with the New England Revolution for the remainder of the 1997 season and into 1998. He then signed with the Worcester Wildfire. He finished the season with the Wildfire, then signed with the Western Mass Pioneers on December 15, 1998. In 1999, the Pioneers won the USL D-3 Pro League championship as Jachym scored the game-winning goal. Jachym finished the season with 28 goals in all competitions for the Pioneers in 1999. After having arthroscopic knee surgery during the pre-season, Jachym played limited time in 2000. He retired at the end of the season to devote himself to coaching. In July 2001, he returned to the Pioneers. In 2003, Jachym led the USL Pro Select League in scoring and was named both as League MVP and First Team All League. He retired again at the end of the 2004 season.

== Coach ==
In addition to playing professionally, Jachym spent several years as an assistant with the Wethersfield High School boys' soccer team. In 2000, he became Wethersfield's head coach and took the team to four state championships over nine seasons.
