= Joey Martinez =

American soccer player (born 1975)

Personal information
- Date of birth: December 28, 1975 (age 50)
- Place of birth: Escondido, California, U.S.
- Height: 6 ft 1 in (1.85 m)
- Position: Defender

Senior career*
Years	Team	Apps	(Gls)
1995–1996	Milwaukee Rampage		
1995–1996	Detroit Rockers (indoor)	34	(8)
1997	Dallas Burn	19	(0)
1997	→ El Paso Patriots (loan)	1	(0)
1998	Miami Fusion	6	(0)
1999	San Jose Clash	15	(0)
2001	San Diego Flash	10	(0)
2001	San Diego Sockers (indoor)		
- * Club domestic league appearances and goals

Joey Martinez is an American retired soccer defender who played professionally in the USL A-League, Major League Soccer and National Professional Soccer League.

Martinez grew up playing for the La Jolla Nomads soccer club. In 1995, Martinez began his professional career with the Milwaukee Rampage of the USISL. He was seventeen at the time. He played both the 1995 and 1996 outdoor seasons with the Rampage. He also played the 1995-1996 indoor season with the Detroit Rockers of the National Professional Soccer League. On February 2, 1997, the Dallas Burn selected Martinez in the second round (twentieth overall) of the 1997 MLS Supplemental Draft. He appeared in nineteen games for the Burn in 1997, going on loan to the El Paso Patriots for one game. On November 6, 1997, the Miami Fusion selected Martinez with the eighth selection of the 1997 MLS Expansion Draft. He had several injuries limiting him to six games for the Fusion during the 1998 season and on November 1, 1998, the Fusion waived Martinez and six other players. He then signed with the San Jose Clash. On November 25, 1999, the Clash waived Martinez. In April 2001, Martinez signed with the San Diego Flash of the USL A-League. He played twelve games, then left the team to join the San Diego Sockers of the World Indoor Soccer League.
