= Gerell Elliott =

American soccer player (born 1970)

Personal information
- Date of birth: May 11, 1970 (age 56)
- Place of birth: Albuquerque, New Mexico, U.S.
- Height: 5 ft 11 in (1.80 m)
- Position: Midfielder

Youth career
- 1988–1991: Fresno State

Senior career*
Years	Team	Apps	(Gls)
1992–1993	SSV Ulm 1846	24	(6)
1993–1995	Sacramento Knights (indoor)		
1993–1994	Kansas City Attack (indoor)	6	(1)
1996–1998	Dallas Burn	65	(15)
1999–2000	Sacramento Knights (indoor)		
- * Club domestic league appearances and goals

Gerell Elliott (born May 11, 1970) is an American retired soccer player who spent three seasons in Major League Soccer.

== Youth ==
Elliott grew up in Albuquerque, New Mexico where he attended Manzano High School. He then attended Fresno State University, playing on the men's soccer team from 1988 to 1991. He was a 1990 Third-Team All-American and a 1991 First-Team All-American. in addition to being the 1991 Big West Player of the Year. He finished his career with fifty-four goals and twenty-eight assists.

== Professional ==
In August 1992, Elliott signed with SSV Ulm 1846 of the Oberliga Baden-Württemberg. He played twenty-four games, scoring six goals. In the summer of 1993, Elliott returned to the United States and joined the Sacramento Knights of the Continental Indoor Soccer League (CISL) which had picked him in the first round (third overall) of the draft. He would continue to play for the Knights for the 1993, 1994 and 1995 summer seasons. In the fall of 1993, he signed with the Kansas City Attack of the National Professional Soccer League (NPSL). On February 7, 1996, the Dallas Burn selected Elliott in the eighth round (seventy-third overall) in the 1996 MLS Inaugural Player Draft. He spent three seasons with the Burn, winning the 1997 U.S. Open Cup, before announcing his intention to retire in November 1998. In 1999, he returned to the Sacramento Knights, now competing in the World Indoor Soccer League. That season, the Knights won the league championship. He retired following the 2000 season.

== Teaching career ==
After Elliott retired, he began teaching at Arlington Heights Elementary (San Juan Unified School District) located in Citrus Heights, California in 2003.

Then in 2008, he left Arlington Heights and began teaching at Twin Lakes Elementary which is in the same district. But in 2011, he started teaching at Del Dayo Elementary School, then after three weeks, he returned to Twin Lakes. He later went on to teach at Woodside K8 school, and is currently a second grade teacher.
