= Sergio Miguez =

Argentine footballer

Personal information
- Full name: Sergio Fernando Miguez
- Date of birth: June 9, 1967 (age 59)
- Place of birth: San Isidro, Buenos Aires, Argentina
- Height: 5 ft 7 in (1.70 m)
- Position: Defender

Senior career*
Years	Team	Apps	(Gls)
1986–1987	River Platte		
1987–1988	Instituto		
1988–1989	Colón		
1989–1990	Racing Club		
1991–1993	Textil Mandiyú		
1994	Racing Club		
1994–1995	Platense		
1995–1996	San Martín		
1997	Columbus Crew	17	(0)
- * Club domestic league appearances and goals

Sergio “Pato” Miguez is a retired Argentine association football defender who spent one season in Major League Soccer.

In 1986, Miguez began his professional career with Club Atlético River Plate. Over the years, he played for eight teams in Argentina before ending his career with the Columbus Crew during the 1997 Major League Soccer season.
