= South Carolina Shamrocks =

The South Carolina Shamrocks were an American soccer team that played in Spartanburg, South Carolina. The Shamrocks played the 1998 and 1999 seasons at Greer City Stadium, then called Shamrock Stadium.

== Year-by-year ==
| Year | Division | League | Reg. season | Playoffs | Open Cup |
|---|---|---|---|---|---|
| 1996 | 3 | USISL Select League | 2nd, South Atlantic | 1st Round | Did not qualify |
| 1997 | 3 | USISL D-3 Pro League | 2nd, South Atlantic | Division Semifinals | Did not qualify |
| 1998 | 3 | USISL D-3 Pro League | 5th, Atlantic | Division Semifinals | Did not qualify |
| 1999 | 3 | USL D-3 Pro League | 5th, Atlantic | 1st Round | Did not qualify |

== Coaches ==
- Leo Flanagan (1997)

== Venues ==
- Eugene Stone Stadium (1996)
- Greer City Stadium (1997–)
