= João Luiz (footballer, born 1971) =

Brazilian footballer

Personal information
- Full name: João Luiz Ferreira Baptista
- Date of birth: June 23, 1971 (age 55)
- Place of birth: Brazil
- Height: 6 ft 0 in (1.83 m)
- Position: Defender

Senior career*
Years	Team	Apps	(Gls)
- Vasco de Gama
1997	MetroStars	7	(0)
- * Club domestic league appearances and goals

João Luiz Ferreira Batista, known as João Luiz, is a Brazilian former association football player. He spent one season in Major League Soccer.

In 1997, the MetroStars purchased Luiz’ contract from Vasco de Gama. He played only seven games, spending most of the season on injury reserve. The MetroStars released him at the end of the season.
