= Daniel Peinado =

Argentine footballer

Personal information
- Full name: Daniel Fernando Peinado
- Date of birth: September 28, 1967 (age 59)
- Place of birth: San Rafael, Argentina
- Height: 5 ft 10 in (1.78 m)
- Position: Defender

Senior career*
Years	Team	Apps	(Gls)
1986–1993	Estudiantes de la Plata	176	(8)
1993–1996	Club Atlético Lanús	85	(3)
1996	→ América de Cali (loan)	3	(0)
1997	Dallas Burn	29	(3)
1997–1999	Platense	23	(1)
1999–2000	Atlético Tucumán	21	(0)
2000–2002	Godoy Cruz	39	(0)
- * Club domestic league appearances and goals

Daniel Fernando Peinado is a retired Argentine association football player. He played professionally in Argentina, Columbia and Major League Soccer.

Daniel Peinado began his career with Estudiantes de la Plata in 1986. In 1993, he moved to Club Atlético Lanús. His nickname is "Chivo" (Billy Goat).

In 1996, he went on loan to América de Cali. On January 23, 1997, Major League Soccer signed Peinado and assigned him to the Dallas Burn.

On April 26, 1997, Peinado set an MLS record when he committed nine fouls in one half against the Los Angeles Galaxy.

In 1997 he returned to Argentina to play for Platense, Atlético Tucumán and finish his sporting career at Godoy Cruz in 2002.

He is a manager for Club Sportivo Independiente.

== Honours ==
Dallas Burn

- U.S. Open Cup: 1997
