= Damián Álvarez (footballer, born 1973) =

Mexican footballer

Personal information
- Full name: Damián Álvarez Arcos
- Date of birth: 11 March 1973 (age 53)
- Place of birth: Veracruz, Mexico
- Height: 1.76 m (5 ft 9 in)
- Position: Forward

Senior career*
Years	Team	Apps	(Gls)
1991–1995	Atlas	70	(6)
1995–1997	León	57	(10)
1997	Dallas Burn	19	(11)
1997–1998	Guadalajara	4	(0)
1998	Dallas Burn	13	(4)
1998	New England Revolution	2	(0)
1998–2000	América	20	(0)
2000	Pachuca	10	(0)
2001	Venados	6	(1)
2001	Atlante	7	(0)
2002	Toluca	1	(0)
2002	San Luis	4	(0)
2003	Zacatepec	7	(0)
2003	Trotamundos	6	(2)
Total		226	(34)

International career
1992	Mexico U23	2	(0)
1996–1997	Mexico	6	(2)
- * Club domestic league appearances and goals as of 19-07-10

Damián Álvarez Arcos (born March 11, 1973) is a Mexican former footballer who played as a forward.

== Club career ==
A mobile striker able to play up front or on the flank, Álvarez began his career with Atlas in 1991, moving to León in 1995. By the 1995–1996 season, he had broken into the first team at León, scoring 6 goals in 27 matches. In 1997, he had a short spell in Major League Soccer with the Dallas Burn, scoring 11 goals in 19 matches as the Burn reached the MLS playoffs. Between the 1997 and 1998 MLS seasons he had a brief spell at Chivas before returning to Dallas in 1998. After scoring 4 times in 13 games in 1998, Álvarez was traded to the New England Revolution in exchange for Colombian Oscar Pareja, appeared only twice for New England, and left MLS after the season. Returning to Mexico, he joined Club América and later represented Pachuca, Atlante, Toluca, and San Luis, but never again made more than five starts in a top-flight season. His last match at top level came with San Luis in 2002.

== International career ==
Álvarez was also a member of the Mexico national football team. He represented Mexico at the 1991 FIFA World Youth Championship, scoring a goal against Sweden and later competed at the 1992 Summer Olympics in Barcelona, Spain. He earned six caps for the national A-side, making his debut on September 15, 1996, in a World Cup Qualifier against St. Vincent & the Grenadines (0-3 win) in Kingston, Jamaica, substituting Cuauhtémoc Blanco in the 81st minute and scoring in the closing minutes. Álvarez also scored in his final international match, a 3–1 victory over Ecuador on February 5, 1997.

== Career statistics ==
=== International ===
Scores and results list Mexico's goal tally first, score column indicates score after each Álvarez goal.

List of international goals scored by Damian Álvarez
No.	Date	Venue	Opponent	Score	Result	Competition
1	15 September 1996	Arnos Vale Stadium, Kingstown, Saint Vincent and the Grenadines	Saint Vincent and the Grenadines	3–0	3–0	1998 FIFA World Cup qualification
2	5 February 1997	Estadio Azteca, Mexico City, Mexico	Ecuador	3–0	3–1	Friendly
