= 1996 New England Revolution season =

New England Revolution
1996 season
- Owner: Robert Kraft (The Kraft Group)
- Head coach: Frank Stapleton
- Stadium: Foxboro Stadium; Foxborough, Massachusetts
- MLS: Conference: 5th Overall: 9th
- MLS Cup Playoffs: Did not qualify
- U.S. Open Cup: Did not enter
- CONCACAF Champions' Cup: Did not qualify
- Top goalscorer: League: Joe-Max Moore (11); All: Joe-Max Moore (11)
- Highest home attendance: 38,633 (Sep 21 vs. Columbus Crew)
- Lowest home attendance: 11,009 (Sep 12 vs. Tampa Bay Mutiny)
- Average home league attendance: 19,025
- Biggest win: 2 goals: 6 times
- Biggest defeat: 5 goals: SJ 6 – 1 NE (Aug. 11)

The 1996 New England Revolution season was the inaugural season for the New England Revolution both as a club and in Major League Soccer (MLS). The team finished last out of five teams in the Eastern Conference, missing the MLS Cup Playoffs. Following the team's last game of the season, head coach Frank Stapleton resigned on September 26, 1996. He was replaced by Thomas Rongen on November 5, 1996.

Revolution forward Joe-Max Moore was named MLS Player of the Week for Week 18, and Alexi Lalas and Wélton were both named All-Stars for the 1996 MLS All-Star Game.

== Pre-season ==
=== Initial player allocations ===
As part of Major League Soccer's first season, teams were each allocated four marquee players before the 1996 MLS Inaugural Player Draft. On October 17, 1995, MLS allocated defender Alexi Lalas and defender Mike Burns to the Revolution. Lalas was a United States national team regular who had played in the 1992 Summer Olympics and 1994 FIFA World Cup and was under contract with Padova in Italy's Serie A, while Burns had played alongside Lalas for the United States in the 1992 Olympics and was playing for Viborg FF in Denmark's Superliga at the time.

On February 5, 1996, MLS allocated American goalkeeper Jim St. Andre of the A-League's New York Centaurs and Italian forward Giuseppe Galderisi, Lalas' teammate at Padova, to the Revolution.

=== First head coach ===
On January 4, 1996, the team named Frank Stapleton the first head coach of the New England Revolution. Stapleton was an Irish international who had played for Arsenal, Manchester United, Ajax, Blackburn Rovers, and Bradford City among others.

=== Draft results ===
==== Inaugural player draft ====
On February 6 and 7, 1996, New England selected 16 players in the Inaugural Player Draft.

New England Revolution – 1996 MLS Inaugural Player Draft
Round	Overall	Name	Position	Previous club
1	5	(Canada) Iain Fraser	D	(United States) Sacramento Knights
2	15	(United States) Peter Woodring	M	(United States) Hawaii Tsunami
3	25	(Federal Republic of Yugoslavia) Bojan Vučković	F	(United States) Tampa Bay Terror
4	35	(United States) Marquis White	F	(Bolivia) Club Destroyers
5	45	(United States) Ted Chronopoulos	D	(Greece) Panionios
6	55	(United States) Yari Allnutt	F	(Mexico) Irapuato
7	65	(United States) Rob Ukrop	F	(United States) Richmond Kickers
8	75	(United States) Darren Sawatzky	M	(United States) Oregon Surge
9	85	(Puerto Rico) Tom Lips	D	(United States) New York Fever
10	95	(Slovakia) Richard Weiszmann	D	(United States) North Bay Breakers
11	105	(United States) John DeBrito	M	(United States) New York Fever
12	115	(United States) Jim Adams	GK	(United States) Cleveland Crunch
13	125	(Canada) Geoff Aunger	M	(Canada) Vancouver 86ers
14	135	(Brazil) Antonio Superbia	M	(United States) Jersey Dragons
15	145	(United States) Derk Droze	F	(Chile) San Marcos
16	155	(United States) Jorge Olamendi	M	(United States) Los Angeles Salsa

==== College draft ====
On March 4, 1996, the Revolution selected Paul Keegan, Imad Baba, and Paulo Dos Santos in the College Draft.

New England Revolution – 1996 MLS College Draft
Round	Overall	Name	Position	Previous club
1	6	(Republic of Ireland) Paul Keegan	F	(United States) Boston College Eagles
2	16	(United States) Imad Baba	M	(United States) Clemson Tigers
3	26	(Cape Verde) Paulo Dos Santos	M	(United States) Rhode Island Rams

==== Supplemental draft ====
Following the College Draft, the Revolution selected Beto Naveda, Wélton, and Zak Ibsen in the Supplemental Draft.

New England Revolution – 1996 MLS Supplemental Draft
Round	Overall	Name	Position	Previous club
1	6	(Argentina) Beto Naveda	M	(Argentina) Boca Juniors
2	16	(Brazil) Wélton	F	(Brazil) America (RJ)
3	26	(United States) Zak Ibsen	D	(United States) Tampa Bay Terror

== Competitions ==
=== Major League Soccer ===
==== Conference standings ====
Pos	Team	Pld	W	SOW	L	GF	GA	GD	Pts	Qualification
1	Tampa Bay Mutiny	32	19	1	12	66	51	+15	58	MLS Cup Playoffs
2	D.C. United	32	15	1	16	62	56	+6	46	MLS Cup Playoffs
3	NY/NJ MetroStars	32	12	3	17	45	47	−2	39	MLS Cup Playoffs
4	Columbus Crew	32	11	4	17	59	60	−1	37	MLS Cup Playoffs
5	New England Revolution	32	9	6	17	43	56	−13	33	

Source: MLS

==== Overall standings ====
Pos	Team	Pld	W	SOW	L	GF	GA	GD	Pts	Qualification
1	Tampa Bay Mutiny (S)	32	19	1	12	66	51	+15	58	
2	Los Angeles Galaxy	32	15	4	13	59	49	+10	49	CONCACAF Champions' Cup
3	D.C. United (C)	32	15	1	16	62	56	+6	46	CONCACAF Champions' Cup
4	Dallas Burn	32	12	5	15	50	48	+2	41	
5	Kansas City Wiz	32	12	5	15	61	63	−2	41	
6	NY/NJ MetroStars	32	12	3	17	45	47	−2	39	
7	San Jose Clash	32	12	3	17	50	50	0	39	
8	Columbus Crew	32	11	4	17	59	60	−1	37	
9	New England Revolution	32	9	6	17	43	56	−13	33	
10	Colorado Rapids	32	9	2	21	44	59	−15	29	

Source: MLS
Rules for classification: 1) points; 2) head-to-head record; 3) goal difference; 4) number of goals scored
(C) Champions; (S) Supporters' Shield

==== Matches ====
April 13, 1996 1	Tampa Bay Mutiny	3–2	New England Revolution	Tampa, Florida
	Lassiter 25' (Pittman); McKinley 53' (Vásquez); Pittman 65' (Valderrama)	Report	Ukrop; St. Andre (red card) 89'	Stadium: Houlihan's Stadium; Attendance: 26,473

April 20, 1996 2	New York/New Jersey MetroStars	0–1	New England Revolution	East Rutherford, New Jersey
		Report	Caricola 87' (o.g.)	Stadium: Giants Stadium; Attendance: 46,826

April 27, 1996 3	New England Revolution	1–1 (SO) (3–2 p)	D.C. United	Foxborough, Massachusetts
	Aunger 78' (pen.)	Report	Díaz Arce	Stadium: Foxboro Stadium; Attendance: 32,864

May 4, 1996 4	New England Revolution	1–2	San Jose Clash	Foxborough, Massachusetts
	Aunger 86' (pen.)	Report	Wynalda 23' (Iroha); Bravo	Stadium: Foxboro Stadium; Attendance: 16,334

May 11, 1996 5	Columbus Crew	3–2	New England Revolution	Columbus, Ohio
	McBride 48' (pen.), 89' (Clark); Marino 87'	Report	Wélton; Naveda	Stadium: Ohio Stadium; Attendance: 24,750

May 19, 1996 6	New England Revolution	2–0	New York/New Jersey MetroStars	Foxborough, Massachusetts
	Naveda 9'; Keegan 18' (Wélton)	Report		Stadium: Foxboro Stadium; Attendance: 20,131

May 25, 1996 7	New England Revolution	2–2 (SO) (1–0 p)	Colorado Rapids	Foxborough, Massachusetts
	Naveda 47'; Aunger 68' (pen.)	Report	Wegerle; Harbor 88' (C. Henderson)	Stadium: Foxboro Stadium; Attendance: 14,323

June 1, 1996 8	Kansas City Wiz	2–1	New England Revolution	Kansas City, Missouri
	Ekeme (yellow card) 30'; Preki 80' (Uderitz); Johnston 89' (Preki)	Report	Naveda (yellow card) 10'; Keegan, (yellow card) 88'; Aunger (yellow card) 74'	Stadium: Arrowhead Stadium; Attendance: 17,808

June 6, 1996 9	New England Revolution	2–2 (SO) (2–3 p)	Los Angeles Galaxy	Foxborough, Massachusetts
7:30 PM EDT	Naveda 72' (Wélton); Burns 78'	Report	Jones 39'; Semioli 86'	Stadium: Foxboro Stadium; Attendance: 20,236

June 15, 1996 10	New England Revolution	1–1 (SO) (2–1 p)	Kansas City Wiz	Foxborough, Massachusetts
	Keegan 50' (Sawatzky)	Report	Preki 75'	Stadium: Foxboro Stadium; Attendance: 21,407; Referee: Paul Tamberino

June 23, 1996 11	New England Revolution	1–4	Dallas Burn	Foxborough, Massachusetts
	Keegan 27' (Aunger)	Report	Lozzano 1' (Soñora); Farrer 48'; Santel; Haynes 89' (Soñora)	Stadium: Foxboro Stadium; Attendance: 17,066

June 27, 1996 12	New England Revolution	1–1 (SO) (1–2 p)	Columbus Crew	Foxborough, Massachusetts
	Wélton	Report	Marino 20' (Caligiuri)	Stadium: Foxboro Stadium; Attendance: 15,209

June 30, 1996 13	D.C. United	3–1	New England Revolution	Washington, D.C.
	Rammel 1'; Díaz Arce 46' (Harkes); Harkes 89'	Report	Naveda 38' (St. Andre)	Stadium: Robert F. Kennedy Memorial Stadium; Attendance: 19,355

July 4, 1996 14	Los Angeles Galaxy	0–1	New England Revolution	Pasadena, California
		Report	Kerr Jr.	Stadium: Rose Bowl; Attendance: 62,703

July 6, 1996 15	San Jose Clash	1–1 (SO) (3–4 p)	New England Revolution	San Jose, California
	Wynalda	Report	Kerr Jr. 66' (Woodring)	Stadium: Spartan Stadium; Attendance: 18,813

July 11, 1996 16	Columbus Crew	1–1 (SO) (0–3 p)	New England Revolution	Columbus, Ohio
	Caligiuri 25'	Report	Chronopoulos 78' (Woodring)	Stadium: Ohio Stadium; Attendance: 13,751

July 20, 1996 17	New England Revolution	2–0	D.C. United	Foxborough, Massachusetts
	Sawatzky	Report		Stadium: Foxboro Stadium; Attendance: 18,347

July 24, 1996 18	Colorado Rapids	2–0	New England Revolution	Denver, Colorado
	Benedetti 59' (Harbor); Bartlett 73' (C. Henderson)	Report		Stadium: Mile High Stadium; Attendance: 6,236

July 27, 1996 19	Kansas City Wiz	4–2	New England Revolution	Kansas City, Missouri
	Takawira; Chung 44' (Klopas); Preki 49' (Takawira)	Report	Woodring 15' (Wélton); Sawatzky 41'	Stadium: Arrowhead Stadium; Attendance: 11,555

July 31, 1996 20	New England Revolution	2–0	San Jose Clash	Foxborough, Massachusetts
	Moore	Report		Stadium: Foxboro Stadium; Attendance: 12,871

August 3, 1996 21	New England Revolution	1–1 (SO) (3–2 p)	New York/New Jersey MetroStars	Foxborough, Massachusetts
	Moore	Report	Donadoni 54'	Stadium: Foxboro Stadium; Attendance: 20,162

August 8, 1996 22	Los Angeles Galaxy	1–0	New England Revolution	Pasadena, California
12:00 AM EDT	Hurtado 80' (Jones)	Report		Stadium: Rose Bowl; Attendance: 10,251

August 11, 1996 23	San Jose Clash	6–1	New England Revolution	San Jose, California
	Dayak; Espinoza 48' (Rodas), 84' (Wynalda); Doyle 62' (Lewis); Rodas 81'	Report	Moore	Stadium: Spartan Stadium; Attendance: 12,099

August 14, 1996 24	New York/New Jersey MetroStars	4–0	New England Revolution	East Rutherford, New Jersey
	Wood 8' (Donadoni); Johnson 17', 73' (de Ávila) de Ávila 81' (Ramos)	Report		Stadium: Giants Stadium; Attendance: 20,711

August 16, 1996 25	New England Revolution	2–0	Colorado Rapids	Foxborough, Massachusetts
	Moore 28' (Naveda), 89' (Naveda)	Report		Stadium: Foxboro Stadium; Attendance: 14,103

August 21, 1996 26	New England Revolution	4–2	Tampa Bay Mutiny	Foxborough, Massachusetts
	Naveda 23'; Lalas; Moore 79' (pen.); Wélton 88' (Burns)	Report	Galderisi 18'; Vásquez 51'	Stadium: Foxboro Stadium; Attendance: 18,764

August 31, 1996 27	Tampa Bay Mutiny	3–1	New England Revolution	Tampa, Florida
	Lassiter 26' (Galderisi); Ralston 46'; Hunjak 58' (Galderisi)	Report	Baba 73'	Stadium: Houlihan's Stadium; Attendance: 8,128

September 4, 1996 28	New England Revolution	2–1	Dallas Burn	Foxborough, Massachusetts
	Watson; Moore 78' (pen.)	Report	Eck	Stadium: Foxboro Stadium; Attendance: 12,933

September 7, 1996 29	Dallas Burn	0–2	New England Revolution	Dallas, Texas
		Report	Sawatzky; Baba	Stadium: Cotton Bowl; Attendance: 18,582

September 12, 1996 30	New England Revolution	1–2	Tampa Bay Mutiny	Foxborough, Massachusetts
	Moore	Report	Lassiter 25' (pen.); Vásquez 74'	Stadium: Foxboro Stadium; Attendance: 11,009

September 17, 1996 31	D.C. United	3–2	New England Revolution	Washington, D.C.
	Pope 58' (Etcheverry); Díaz Arce	Report	Moore 39' (pen.), 78'	Stadium: Robert F. Kennedy Memorial Stadium; Attendance: 7,360

September 21, 1996 32	New England Revolution	0–1	Columbus Crew	Foxborough, Massachusetts
		Report	McBride 37' (Maisonneuve)	Stadium: Foxboro Stadium; Attendance: 38,633

== Honors ==
New England Revolution – 1996 League and Team Awards
Honor	Name	Winner / Nominee
Team Most Valuable Player	Joe-Max Moore	Winner
Team Scoring Champion	Joe-Max Moore (23 pts, 11 G, 1 A)	Winner
Team Defender of the Year	Francis Okaroh	Winner
MLS All-Star Game Selections	Alexi Lalas, Wélton	Winner
MLS Player of the Week	Joe-Max Moore (Week 18)	Winner

New England Revolution – 1996 Statistical Leaders
Games played	Geoff Aunger	29
Games Started	Geoff Aunger	26
Minutes played	Alexi Lalas	2,218
Goals	Joe-Max Moore	11
Assists	Alberto Naveda	7
Shots	Alberto Naveda	65
Shots on Goal	Alberto Naveda	35
Fouls Committed	Geoff Aunger	66
Fouls Suffered	Welton	62
Cautions	Geoff Aunger	10
Ejections	Lalas, Okaroh, Heaney, St. Andre, Watson	1
