= 1996 Kansas City Wiz season =

Kansas City Wiz
1996 season
- Head coach: Ron Newman
- Major League Soccer: West: 3rd Overall: 5th
- USOC: Quarterfinals
- Playoffs: Conference Finals
- Top goalscorer: League: Preki (18); All: Preki (22)
- Average home league attendance: 12,878
Home colors	Away colors

The 1996 Kansas City Wiz season was the first in team and MLS history. Played at Arrowhead Stadium in Kansas City, Missouri. The Wizards were at first named the Wiz and played under that name through 1996 before having it changed for the 1997 season. MLS did not allow matches to end in ties in 1996 and thus Shootouts were used to decide draws, the stats that follow do not include shootout goals scored and the teams actually point total in the regular season was 41 even though it is shown below as 51. Shootout win= 1 point, Shootout loss= 0 points.

== Squad ==
Note: Flags indicate national team as defined under FIFA eligibility rules; some limited exceptions apply. Players may hold more than one non-FIFA nationality.

No.	Pos.	Nation	Player
0	GK	USA	Mike Ammann
1	GK	CAN	Pat Harrington
2	DF	USA	Tommy Reasoner
3	FW	ENG	Paul Wright
4	MF	USA	Scott Uderitz
5	MF	USA	David Moxom
6	DF	USA	Sean Bowers
7	FW	LBR	Nyanforth Peters
8	FW	USA	Eric Eichmann
9	FW	JAM	Peter Isaacs
10	MF	USA	Mike Sorber
11	MF	USA	Preki
12	FW	ZIM	Vitalis Takawira

No.	Pos.	Nation	Player
13	MF	USA	Mark Chung
14	FW	USA	Frank Klopas
15	DF	CMR	Samuel Ekeme
16	MF	USA	Diego Gutiérrez
17	MF	USA	Kevin Koetters
18	MF	USA	Billy Baumhoff
18	MF	USA	Yari Allnut
19	DF	LBR	Dionysius Sebwe
20	DF	NGR	Uche Okafor
21	MF	USA	Matt McKeon
22	GK	USA	Chris Snitko
23	FW	USA	Alan Prampin
23	FW	USA	Stephen Martines
25	GK	USA	Garth Lagerwey
26	FW	SCO	Mo Johnston

== Competitions ==
=== Major League Soccer ===
Overall								Home						Away					
Pld	W	D	L	GF	GA	GD	Pts	W	D	L	GF	GA	GD	W	D	L	GF	GA	GD
32	17	0	15	61	63	−2	51	11	0	5	40	28	+12	6	0	10	21	35	−14

Last updated: 1996.
Source: Major League Soccer

Date	Opponents	H / A	Result F – A	Scorers	Attendance
April 13, 1996	Colorado Rapids	H	3–0	Takawira 2 Klopas	21,141
April 18, 1996	Dallas Burn	A	0–3		9,405
April 21, 1996	San Jose Clash	A	2–2 (W)	Okafor; Prampin	17,580
May 2, 1996	Columbus Crew	H	6–4	Chung; Johnston 2 Preki 2 Sorber	8,848
May 5, 1996	Colorado Rapids	A	0–4		11,070
May 8, 1996	Tampa Bay Mutiny	A	0–2		7,025
May 11, 1996	Dallas Burn	H	2–3	Preki 2	17,706
May 19, 1996	Los Angeles Galaxy	A	0–2		25,231
May 22, 1996	NY/NJ MetroStars	H	2–1	Prampin; Preki	8,916
May 29, 1996	San Jose Clash	A	1–2	Allnut	10,299
June 1, 1996	New England Revolution	H	2–1	Preki; Johnston	117,808
June 5, 1996	Tampa Bay Mutiny	H	1–3	Preki	9,551
June 8, 1996	Columbus Crew	A	3–3 (W)	Takawira; Uderitz; Preki	16,526
June 15, 1996	New England Revolution	A	1–1 (L)	Preki	21,407
June 20, 1996	D.C. United	H	5–1	Preki; Takawira 2 Chung; Sorber	9,458
June 26, 1996	NY/NJ MetroStars	A	0–2		16,103
June 29, 1996	Dallas Burn	A	1–0	Sorber	9,615
July 6, 1996	Los Angeles Galaxy	H	3–1	Uderitz; Preki; Takawira	17,921
July 10, 1996	Colorado Rapids	H	2–0	Klopas; Okafor	8,062
July 18, 1996	Tampa Bay Mutiny	A	2–3	Johnston; Prampin	7,520
July 20, 1996	Dallas Burn	H	1–2	Preki	11,592
July 27, 1996	New England Revolution	H	4–2	Takawira 2 Chung; Preki	11,555
July 31, 1996	D.C. United	A	3–2	Own goal Preki; Chung	9,457
August 4, 1996	D.C. United	A	4–2	Chung 2 Takawira 2	12,356
August 7, 1996	Colorado Rapids	A	2–4	Preki; Sorber	6,013
August 11, 1996	Los Angeles Galaxy	H	2–2 (W)	Preki; Chung	13,362
August 15, 1996	San Jose Clash	H	4–1	Johnston; Preki; Takawira 2	8,250
August 21, 1996	Los Angeles Galaxy	A	1–1 (W)	Chung	13,073
August 24, 1996	Columbus Crew	A	1–2	Johnston	20,246
September 1, 1996	NY/NJ MetroStars	H	2–2 (W)	Own goal Takawira	11,139
September 7, 1996	Columbus Crew	H	1–5	Preki	12,141
September 21, 1996	San Jose Clash	H	0–0 (L)		18,594

=== U.S. Open Cup ===
Date	Round	Opponents	H / A	Result F – A	Scorers	Attendance
September 15, 1996	Quarterfinals	Colorado Rapids	H	2–3	Bowers; Takawira	5,009

=== MLS Cup Playoffs ===
Date	Round	Opponents	H / A	Result F – A	Scorers	Attendance
September 26, 1996	Conference Semi-Finals	Dallas Burn	H	3–2	Johnston; McKeon; Preki	4,466
September 29, 1996	Conference Semi-Finals	Dallas Burn	A	1–2	Preki	10,125
October 2, 1996	Conference Semi-Finals	Dallas Burn	A	2–2 (W)	Chung; Takawira	9,802
October 10, 1996	Conference Finals	Los Angeles Galaxy	A	1–2	Preki	25,212
October 13, 1996	Conference Finals	Los Angeles Galaxy	H	1–1 (L)	Preki	11,041

== Squad statistics ==
No.	Pos.	Name	MLS		USOC		Playoffs		Total		Minutes		Discipline	
No.	Pos.	Name	Apps	Goals	Apps	Goals	Apps	Goals	Apps	Goals	League	Total	Yellow card	Red card
11	MF	(United States) Preki	32	18	1	0	5	4	38	22	2880	3420	0	0
13	MF	(United States) Mark Chung	32	8	1	0	5	1	38	9	2847	3386	0	0
6	DF	(United States) Sean Bowers	31	0	1	0	5	1	37	1	2769	3309	0	0
26	FW	(Scotland) Mo Johnston	29	6	1	0	5	1	35	7	2573	3113	0	0
20	DF	(Nigeria) Uche Okafor	30	2	1	0	4	0	35	2	2593	2880	0	0
12	FW	(Zimbabwe) Vitalis Takawira	28	13	1	1	5	1	34	15	2233	2762	0	0
16	MF	(United States) Diego Gutiérrez	28	0	1	0	5	0	34	0	2069	2609	0	0
4	MF	(United States) Scott Uderitz	28	2	0	0	5	0	33	2	2115	2546	0	0
10	MF	(United States) Mike Sorber	23	4	1	0	5	0	29	4	1960	2429	0	0
25	GK	(United States) Garth Lagerwey	23	0	0	0	5	0	28	0	1959	2409	0	0
14	FW	(United States) Frank Klopas	22	2	1	0	3	0	26	2	1235	1316	0	0
15	DF	(Cameroon) Samuel Ekeme	23	0	0	0	2	0	25	0	1693	1723	0	0
4	FW	(England) Paul Wright	17	0	1	0	5	0	23	0	690	1125	0	0
21	MF	(United States) Matt McKeon	12	0	1	0	5	1	18	1	823	1189	0	0
17	MF	(United States) Kevin Koetters	15	0	1	0	0	0	16	0	744	768	0	0
23	FW	(United States) Alan Prampin	15	3	1	0	0	0	16	3	337	386	0	0
8	FW	(United States) Eric Eichmann	15	0	0	0	0	0	15	0	480	480	0	0
2	DF	(United States) Tommy Reasoner	13	0	0	0	0	0	13	0	645	645	0	0
1	GK	(Canada) Pat Harrington	8	0	0	0	0	0	8	0	630	630	0	0
0	GK	(United States) Mike Ammann	4	0	1	0	0	0	5	0	291	336	0	0
22	GK	(United States) Chris Snitko	0	0	1	0	0	0	1	0	45	45	0	0
18	MF	(United States) Yari Allnut	1	1	0	0	0	0	1	1	45	45	0	0

Final Statistics

== Kits ==
Home	Home Alternate	Away
