= Cody Brown =

American football player (born 1986)

No. 52
- Position: Linebacker

Personal information
- Born: November 9, 1986 (age 40); Coral Springs, Florida, U.S.
- Listed height: 6 ft 3 in (1.91 m)
- Listed weight: 252 lb (114 kg)

Career information
- High school: Coral Springs
- College: Connecticut
- NFL draft: 2009: 2nd round, 63rd overall pick

Career history
- Arizona Cardinals (2009)*; New York Jets (2010–2011)*; Detroit Lions (2011)*; Calgary Stampeders (2012)*; Montreal Alouettes (2013)*
- * Offseason or practice squad member only

Awards and highlights
- First-team All-Big East (2008)
- Stats at Pro Football Reference

Cody Dion Brown (born November 9, 1986) is an American former professional football player who was a linebacker in the National Football League (NFL). He played college football for the Connecticut Huskies and was selected by the Arizona Cardinals in the second round of the 2009 NFL draft.

He was also a member of the Detroit Lions, New York Jets, Calgary Stampeders, and Montreal Alouettes.

== Early life ==
Brown attended Coral Springs High School, where he made 88 tackles and had nine quarterback sacks as a senior. He was named first-team All-Broward County and honorable mention All-State.

Considered a two-star recruit by Rivals.com, Brown was not ranked among the best defensive end prospects in the nation.

== College career ==
Brown was a three-year starter at defensive end and a team captain for the Huskies during his senior season. In 2005, he became the first true freshman lineman to start a game after Connecticut's upgrade to NCAA Football Bowl Subdivision. He was named starter for the Huskies during his sophomore season, and has since started every game in which he participated. In his final two seasons as a Husky, Brown registered a total of 18.5 sacks and 33 tackles for loss and he was named to the First-team All-Big East at defensive end after his senior season.

== Professional career ==
Pre-draft measurables
Height	Weight	Arm length	Hand span	40-yard dash	10-yard split	20-yard split	20-yard shuttle	Three-cone drill	Vertical jump	Broad jump	Bench press
6 ft 2 1/8 in (1.88 m)	244 lb (111 kg)	34 1/2 in (0.88 m)	10 1/8 in (0.26 m)	4.84 s	1.75 s	2.84 s	4.40 s	7.10 s	36 1/2 in (0.93 m)	10 ft 0 in (3.05 m)	26 reps
Arm and hand spans from Pro Day, all other values from NFL Combine.

=== Arizona Cardinals ===
Picked 63rd overall by the Arizona Cardinals, Brown was the last of four former Huskies to be taken from in the first two rounds of the 2009 NFL draft. The Cardinals selection of Brown, together with the New England Patriots and New York Giants respective second round draft picks, Darius Butler and William Beatty, and first round Indianapolis Colts selection Donald Brown, established a UConn football presence in the NFL draft; by the end of the second round, the only school that exceeded UConn's four picks—by one pick—was USC. Brown suffered a wrist injury during the 2009 preseason and was placed on season-ending injured reserve on August 24.

Brown returned to the team after his surgery, but was waived by the team on September 3, 2010 after he struggled to make the transition from college end to 3-4 NFL outside linebacker.

=== New York Jets ===
The New York Jets signed Brown to their practice squad on September 7, 2010. Brown was signed to a future contract on January 25, 2011. He was waived on August 7.

=== Detroit Lions ===
On August 8, 2011, the Detroit Lions claimed him off waivers, but he never reported to the team and was waived on February 4, 2012.

=== Calgary Stampeders ===
Brown signed with the Calgary Stampeders of the Canadian Football League in February 2012, but was released in training camp, prior to the 2012 CFL season.

=== Montreal Alouettes ===
Brown signed with the Montreal Alouettes of the Canadian Football League on May 13, 2013. He was released on June 1, 2013 before the season started.
