= Superbia =

Superbia (Latin: pride) may refer to:

- Superbia (film), a 2016 Hungarian animated short by Luca Tóth
- Superbia (musical), an unproduced rock musical by Jonathan Larson
- Antonio Superbia (active from 1986), Brazilian-American footballer
- Superbia, in the DC Comics universe, the mobile city-state base of the International Ultramarine Corps
