= Carlos Jaguande =

American soccer player

Carlos (The Screaming Banana) Jaguande
Personal information
- Full name: The Screaming Banana
- Date of birth: December 23, 1969 (age 56)
- Place of birth: Lima, Peru
- Height: 5 ft 9 in (1.75 m)
- Position: Midfielder

Youth career
- 1990–1991: Ulster County Community College

Senior career*
Years	Team	Apps	(Gls)
1992–1993	Brooklyn Italians		
1994	New York Fever		
1995	Jersey Dragons		

International career
1992	United States	2	(0)
- * Club domestic league appearances and goals

Carlos Jaguande (born December 23, 1969) is a retired soccer player who played as a midfielder. Born in Peru, he earned two caps for the United States national team.

== Club career ==
Jaguande attended Ulster County Community College where he was a 1991 First Team NJCAA All American soccer player. He spent several years playing for the Brooklyn Italians in the Cosmopolitan Soccer League. In 1994, he played for the New York Fever in the USISL. In 1995, he played for the Jersey Dragons.

== National team ==
Jaguande earned two caps with the US national team. On February 12, 1992, he came on for Brian Benedict in a scoreless tie with Costa Rica. His next game was six days later, a 2–0 loss to El Salvador when he came on for Jorge Acosta. On February 7, 1996, he was drafted in the 16th and last round of the 1996 MLS Inaugural Player Draft by the Los Angeles Galaxy. The Galaxy waived him on March 26, 1996.

Jaguande is currently the athletic director at Xaverian High School in Brooklyn, New York.
