= Lance Hill =

Lance Hill may refer to:

- Lance Hill (manufacturer), Australian manufacturer of the Hills Hoist, a height-adjustable rotary clothes line
- Lance Hill (soccer) (born 1972), retired U.S. soccer forward
- Lance Hill (inventor) from IP Australia
- Lance Hill (racing driver) from 1962 Bathurst Six Hour Classic
- R. Lance Hill (David Lee Henry), screenwriter and author of the book that the 1984 film The Evil That Men Do is based on
