= Uderitz =

Uderitz is a surname. Notable people with the surname include:

- Hal Uderitz (born 1999), American soccer player
- Scott Uderitz (born 1970), American soccer player
