= Josh McKay =

Josh McKay may refer to:

- Josh McKay (musician), American musician
- Josh McKay (rugby union) (born 1997), New Zealand rugby union player
- Josh McKay (soccer) (born 1971), American soccer player
