= 1996 MLS Inaugural Player Draft =

First player draft in MLS history

The MLS Inaugural Player Draft, held before Major League Soccer's initial 1996 season, distributed players to the league's ten inaugural teams. The Inaugural Player Draft occurred on February 6 and 7, 1996 after each team was allocated four marquee players.

The Columbus Crew selected Brian McBride with the first overall pick.

^	Denotes player who has been inducted to the US Soccer Hall of Fame

*	Denotes player who has been selected for an MLS Best XI team

== Round 1 ==
Pick #	MLS team	Player	Position	Previous Team
1	Columbus Crew	Brian McBride	F	VfL Wolfsburg
2	Colorado Rapids	Jean Harbor	F	Seattle SeaDogs
3	Dallas Burn	Ted Eck	M	Wichita Wings
4	Los Angeles Galaxy	Robin Fraser	D	Colorado Foxes
5	New England Revolution	Iain Fraser	D	Sacramento Knights
6	Kansas City Wiz	Mark Chung	M	San Diego Sockers
7	Tampa Bay Mutiny	Mark Dougherty	GK	Hawaii Tsunami
8	San Jose Clash	Paul Bravo	M	Monterey Bay Jaguars
9	New York/New Jersey MetroStars	Matt Knowles	D	Milwaukee Wave
10	D.C. United	Raúl Díaz Arce	F	Firpo

== Round 2 ==
Pick #	MLS team	Player	Position	Previous Team
11	Columbus Crew	Mark Watson	D	Vancouver 86ers
12	Colorado Rapids	Denis Hamlett	D	Anaheim Splash
13	Dallas Burn	Tom Soehn	D	Las Vegas Dustdevils
14	Los Angeles Galaxy	David Kramer	GK	Monterey Bay Jaguars
15	New England Revolution	Peter Woodring	D	Hawaii Tsunami
16	Kansas City Wiz	Peter Isaacs	F	Tampa Bay Cyclones
17	Tampa Bay Mutiny	Peter Hattrup	M	Seattle Sounders
18	San Jose Clash	Altimont Butler	M	North Jersey Imperials
19	New York/New Jersey MetroStars	Troy Dayak	D	San Jose Grizzlies
20	D.C. United	Shawn Medved	M	Cincinnati Silverbacks

== Round 3 ==
Pick #	MLS team	Player	Position	Previous Team
21	Columbus Crew	Billy Thompson	F	Tampa Bay Terror
22	Colorado Rapids	Steve Trittschuh	D	Tampa Bay Terror
23	Dallas Burn	Lawrence Lozzano	D	Tampico
24	Los Angeles Galaxy	Jorge Salcedo	M	Monarcas Morelia
25	New England Revolution	Bojan Vučković	F	Tampa Bay Terror
26	Kansas City Wiz	Sean Bowers	D	Anaheim Splash
27	Tampa Bay Mutiny	John Diffley	D	Long Island Rough Riders
28	San Jose Clash	Tim Martin	D	Atlanta Ruckus
29	New York/New Jersey MetroStars	Peter Vermes	F	New York Fever
30	D.C. United	Erik Imler	D	Raleigh Flyers

== Round 4 ==
Pick #	MLS team	Player	Position	Previous Team
31	Columbus Crew	Mike Clark	D	Richmond Kickers
32	Colorado Rapids	Brian Bates	D	Richmond Kickers
33	Dallas Burn	Brian Haynes	M	Seattle Sounders
34	Los Angeles Galaxy	John Garvey	F	Baltimore Spirit
35	New England Revolution	Marquis White	F	Club Destroyers
36	Kansas City Wiz	Eric Eichmann	F	St. Louis Ambush
37	Tampa Bay Mutiny	Ivan McKinley	M	Wits University FC
38	San Jose Clash	Rhett Harty	D	Monterey Bay Jaguars
39	New York/New Jersey MetroStars	Jeff Zaun	D	North Jersey Imperials
40	D.C. United	Richie Williams	M	Richmond Kickers

== Round 5 ==
Pick #	MLS team	Player	Position	Previous Team
41	Columbus Crew	Bo Oshoniyi	GK	New York Centaurs
42	Colorado Rapids	Troy Edwards	D	Myrtle Beach Boyz
43	Dallas Burn	Jason Kreis	F	Raleigh Flyers
44	Los Angeles Galaxy	Mark Semioli	D	Monterey Bay Jaguars
45	New England Revolution	Ted Chronopoulos	D	Panionios
46	Kansas City Wiz	Jeff Causey	GK	Richmond Kickers
47	Tampa Bay Mutiny	Diego Viera	F	C.A. Cerro
48	San Jose Clash	Paul Holocher	M	Monterey Bay Jaguars
49	New York/New Jersey MetroStars	A.J. Wood	F	University of Virginia
50	D.C. United	Thor Lee	D	Wichita Wings

== Round 6 ==
Pick #	MLS team	Player	Position	Previous Team
51	Columbus Crew	Brandon Ward	M	Hampton Roads Mariners
52	Colorado Rapids	Scott Cannon	D	Cincinnati Silverbacks
53	Dallas Burn	Mark Dodd	GK	Colorado Foxes
54	Los Angeles Galaxy	Joey Kirk	F	St. Louis Ambush
55	New England Revolution	Yari Allnutt	F	Irapuato
56	Kansas City Wiz	Tommy Reasoner	M	San Diego Top Guns
57	Tampa Bay Mutiny	Frank Yallop	D	Ipswich Town
58	San Jose Clash	Jeff Baicher	F	San Jose Grizzlies
59	New York/New Jersey MetroStars	Ted Gillen	M	Richmond Kickers
60	D.C. United	Brian Kamler	M	Richmond Kickers

== Round 7 ==
Pick #	MLS team	Player	Position	Previous Team
61	Columbus Crew	Janusz Michallik	M	New York Centaurs
62	Colorado Rapids	Matt Kmosko	D	Cincinnati Silverbacks
63	Dallas Burn	Rene Ortiz	M	San Diego Sockers
64	Los Angeles Galaxy	Harut Karapetyan	F	Los Angeles Salsa
65	New England Revolution	Robert Ukrop	F	Richmond Kickers
66	Kansas City Wiz	Scott Uderitz	F	Las Vegas Dustdevils
67	Tampa Bay Mutiny	Frankie Hejduk	D	UCLA
68	San Jose Clash	Jeff Betts	F	Portland Pride
69	New York/New Jersey MetroStars	Zach Thornton	GK	Loyola-Maryland
70	D.C. United	Mile Milovac	GK	United Serbs

== Round 8 ==
Pick #	MLS team	Player	Position	Previous Team
71	Columbus Crew	Todd Yeagley	M	Richmond Kickers
72	Colorado Rapids	Scott Benedetti	F	Colorado Foxes
73	Dallas Burn	Gerell Elliott	M	Sacramento Knights
74	Los Angeles Galaxy	Curt Onalfo	D	Tampico
75	New England Revolution	Darren Sawatzky	F	Oregon Surge
76	Kansas City Wiz	Nyanforth Peters	F	FC Locarno
77	Tampa Bay Mutiny	Tayt Ianni	D	Raj Pracha FC
78	San Jose Clash	Dave Salzwedel	GK	Los Angeles Soccer Club
79	New York/New Jersey MetroStars	Eddie Soto	F	Los Angeles Salsa U-23
80	D.C. United	Kris Kelderman	D	St. Louis Ambush

== Round 9 ==
Pick #	MLS team	Player	Position	Previous Team
81	Columbus Crew	Ramiro Corrales	D	California Jaguars
82	Colorado Rapids	Ian Butterworth	D	Norwich City
83	Dallas Burn	John Kerr, Jr.	M	Walsall
84	Los Angeles Galaxy	Manny Motajo	D	Washington Warthogs
85	New England Revolution	Tom Lips	D	New York Fever
86	Kansas City Wiz	Uche Okafor	D	Ironi Ashdod
87	Tampa Bay Mutiny	Mike Duhaney	M	University of Nevada, Las Vegas
88	San Jose Clash	Victor Mella	F	Colo-Colo
89	New York/New Jersey MetroStars	Giovanni Savarese	F	Long Island Rough Riders
90	D.C. United	Clint Peay	D	University of Virginia

== Round 10 ==
Pick #	MLS team	Player	Position	Previous Team
91	Columbus Crew	Marcelo Carrera	F	Canton Invaders
92	Colorado Rapids	Felipe Rodriguez	M	Pumas
93	Dallas Burn	Jimmy McGeough, Jr.	D	Wichita Wings
94	Los Angeles Galaxy	Joey Leonetti	M	Portland Pride
95	New England Revolution	Richard Weiszmann	D	North Bay Breakers
96	Kansas City Wiz	Alan Prampin	F	Raleigh Flyers
97	Tampa Bay Mutiny	Flávio Ferri	F	San Antonio Pumas
98	San Jose Clash	Henry Gutierrez	M	Myrtle Beach Boyz
99	New York/New Jersey MetroStars	Pat O'Kelly	D	North Jersey Imperials
100	D.C. United	Ben Crawley	F	Richmond Kickers

== Round 11 ==
Pick #	MLS team	Player	Position	Previous Team
101	Columbus Crew	Shane Battelle	D	St. Louis Knights
102	Colorado Rapids	Lance Hill	F	New Orleans Riverboat Gamblers
103	Dallas Burn	Jorge Flores	M	Paramount High School
104	Los Angeles Galaxy	John O'Brien	M	Anaheim Splash
105	New England Revolution	John DeBrito	M	New York Fever
106	Kansas City Wiz	Phil Wellington	GK	Cocoa Expos
107	Tampa Bay Mutiny	Derek Backman	M	Tampa Bay Cyclones
108	San Jose Clash	Oscar Draguicevich	D	Cleveland Crunch
109	New York/New Jersey MetroStars	Mickey Kydes	M	New York Fever
110	D.C. United	Said Fazlagić	D	NK Rovinj

== Round 12 ==
Pick #	MLS team	Player	Position	Previous Team
111	Columbus Crew	Pete Marino	F	Bayer Leverkusen (Regionalliga)
112	Colorado Rapids	Eric Puls	F	St. Louis Knights
113	Dallas Burn	Richard Farrer	F	New Mexico Chiles
114	Los Angeles Galaxy	Adan Villalvazo	F	Cerritos Inter-America
115	New England Revolution	Jim Adams	GK	Cleveland Crunch
116	Kansas City Wiz	Kevin Koetters	M	Kansas City Attack
117	Tampa Bay Mutiny	Nelson Vargas	M	Florida Eagles
118	San Jose Clash	Gabe Garcia	F	Myrtle Beach Boyz
119	New York/New Jersey MetroStars	Khary Stockton	F	Richmond Kickers
120	D.C. United	Daniel de Oliveira	M	Firpo

== Round 13 ==
Pick #	MLS team	Player	Position	Previous Team
121	Columbus Crew	Paul Young	M	Charleston Battery
122	Colorado Rapids	Josh McKay	D	Hawaii Tsunami
123	Dallas Burn	Jimmy Glenn	F	Cincinnati Silverbacks
124	Los Angeles Galaxy	Brad Wilson	M	1. FC Saarbrücken
125	New England Revolution	Geoff Aunger	M	Vancouver 86ers
126	Kansas City Wiz	Billy Baumhoff	D	St. Louis Knights
127	Tampa Bay Mutiny	Zen Luzniak	M	Fort Lauderdale Strikers
128	San Jose Clash	Rafael Amaya	D	Colorado Foxes
129	New York/New Jersey MetroStars	Andrew Restrepo	D	Tampa Bay Cyclones
130	D.C. United	Matthew Olson	GK	Everett BigFoot

== Round 14 ==
Pick #	MLS team	Player	Position	Previous Team
131	Columbus Crew	Laurence Piturro	D	Long Island Rough Riders
132	Colorado Rapids	Khalil Azmi	GK	New Hampshire Ramblers
133	Dallas Burn	Steve Keller	M	Rockford Raptors
134	Los Angeles Galaxy	David Beall	M	San Diego Sockers
135	New England Revolution	Antonio Superbia	M	Jersey Dragons
136	Kansas City Wiz	Terry Woodberry	D	Dallas Sidekicks
137	Tampa Bay Mutiny	Scott Budnick	GK	de:SSV Vorsfelde
138	San Jose Clash	Tom Liner	GK	P.S.V. Schwartz-Weiss
139	New York/New Jersey MetroStars	Nidal Baba	M	Clemson University
140	D.C. United	Sterling Wescott	F	Wichita Wings

== Round 15 ==
Pick #	MLS team	Player	Position	Previous Team
141	Columbus Crew	Todd Haskins	M	Washington Warthogs
142	Colorado Rapids	Brian Hurley	M	Tampico
143	Dallas Burn	Ed Puskarich	D	Milwaukee Wave
144	Los Angeles Galaxy	Garfield Shaw	F	Washington Warthogs
145	New England Revolution	Derk Droze	F	Arica
146	Kansas City Wiz	Samuel Ekeme	D	Monterrey La Raza
147	Tampa Bay Mutiny	Goran Hunjak	F	Kansas City Attack
148	San Jose Clash	Carlos Farias	F	Unattached
149	New York/New Jersey MetroStars	Jorge Acosta	F	New York Fever
150	D.C. United	Garth Lagerwey	GK	Hampton Roads Mariners

== Round 16 ==
Pick #	MLS team	Player	Position	Previous Team
151	Columbus Crew	Manny Catano	M	Des Moines Menace
152	Colorado Rapids	Joel Shanker	M	St. Louis Ambush
153	Dallas Burn	Gabe Gentile	M	Dallas Texans
154	Los Angeles Galaxy	Carlos Jaguande	M	Jersey Dragons
155	New England Revolution	Jorge Olamendi	M	Los Angeles Salsa
156	Kansas City Wiz	Ken Snow	F	Tampa Bay Terror
157	Tampa Bay Mutiny	Greg Lalas	M	Avenir Beggen
158	San Jose Clash	Kevin Grimes	M	Raleigh Flyers
159	New York/New Jersey MetroStars	Walter Bustamante	M	Jersey Dragons
160	D.C. United	Carlos Garcia	M	Myrtle Beach Boyz

== Sources ==
- 1996 season: salaries, drafts - latimes.com
