= Garfield Shaw =

Jamaican footballer (born 1972)

Personal information
- Date of birth: August 27, 1972 (age 54)
- Place of birth: Trenchtown, Jamaica
- Height: 5 ft 10 in (1.78 m)
- Positions: Midfielder; striker

Senior career*
Years	Team	Apps	(Gls)
1995	Washington Warthogs (indoor)		
1998	Minnesota Thunder	22	(3)
1998	Maryland Mania	14	(0)
2010	Maryland Tigers (indoor)		
- * Club domestic league appearances and goals

Garfield Shaw is a retired Jamaican association football striker who played professionally in the USISL.

Shaw spent some of the 1995 Continental Indoor Soccer League season with the Washington Warthogs. In February 1996, the Los Angeles selected Shaw in the fifteenth round (144 overall) of the 1996 MLS Inaugural Player Draft. The Galaxy released him on April 17, 1996 On April 6, 1998, he signed with the Minnesota Thunder of the USISL A-League. On February 18, 1999, the Thunder released Shaw. In 1999, he played for the Maryland Mania. In 2010, he played for the Maryland Tigers in the PASL.
