= Our Lady of Health Syro-Malabar Catholic Church of Miami =

Syro-Malabar Catholic church in Coral Springs, Florida, U.S.

Coordinates: 26.23355°N 80.25266°W

Our Lady of Health Catholic Church in Coral Springs, Florida, is a parish of the St. Thomas Syro-Malabar Catholic Diocese of Chicago.

== History ==
The church was started as a mission in 1986, and was raised to the status of a parish in 2003. Fr. Zacharias Thottuvelil and Fr. John Melepuram served as priests at OLH. In 2009, more than 400 families belonged to the parish.

The parish sponsored a national convention for Syro-Malabar Catholics in 2007.
