= Adan Villalvazo =

American soccer player

Personal information
- Position: Forward

Senior career*
Years	Team	Apps	(Gls)
- Cerritos Inter-America
1997	Orange County Zodiac		
- * Club domestic league appearances and goals

Adan Villalvazo is a retired American soccer forward.

In 1995, Villalvazo played for the amateur Cerritos Inter-America. In February 1996, the Los Angeles Galaxy selected Villalvazo in the 12th round (114th overall) of the 1996 MLS Inaugural Player Draft. The Galaxy released him on March 26, 1996. In 1997, he spent the season with the Orange County Zodiac of the USISL A-League.
