= Josh McKay (soccer) =

American soccer player and coach

Personal information
- Full name: Joshua McKay
- Date of birth: November 16, 1971 (age 54)
- Place of birth: Castro Valley, California, U.S.
- Height: 6 ft 0 in (1.83 m)
- Positions: Defender; midfielder

Youth career
- 1991: UNLV Rebels
- 1992–1994: San Francisco Dons

Senior career*
Years	Team	Apps	(Gls)
1995	Hawaii Tsunami		
1996	Colorado Rapids	4	(0)
1997–2002	Richmond Kickers	136	(5)

Managerial career
- 2003–: San Francisco Dons (assistant)
- * Club domestic league appearances and goals

Joshua "Josh" McKay is an American retired soccer player who is an assistant coach with the University of San Francisco men's soccer team. He played professionally in Major League Soccer and the USISL.

== Youth ==
McKay grew up in Pleasanton, California. In 1991, he began his collegiate career at UNLV. He transferred to University of San Francisco after his freshman year and played three seasons for the Dons. He graduated in 1995 with a bachelor's degree in English.

== Professional ==
In 1995, McKay played for the Hawaii Tsunami of the USISL. On February 7, 1996, the Colorado Rapids selected McKay in the thirteenth round (122nd overall) of the 1996 MLS Inaugural Player Draft. He played four games for the Rapids before being waived on November 8, 1996. In 1997, McKay signed with the Richmond Kickers. He played through the 2002 season with Richmond. When the Kickers released him in the spring of 2003, McKay retired and entered the coaching ranks.

== Coach ==
On August 13, 2003, the University of San Francisco hired McKay as an assistant coach with its men's soccer team.
