= Coral Springs, Florida =

City in the United States

- City
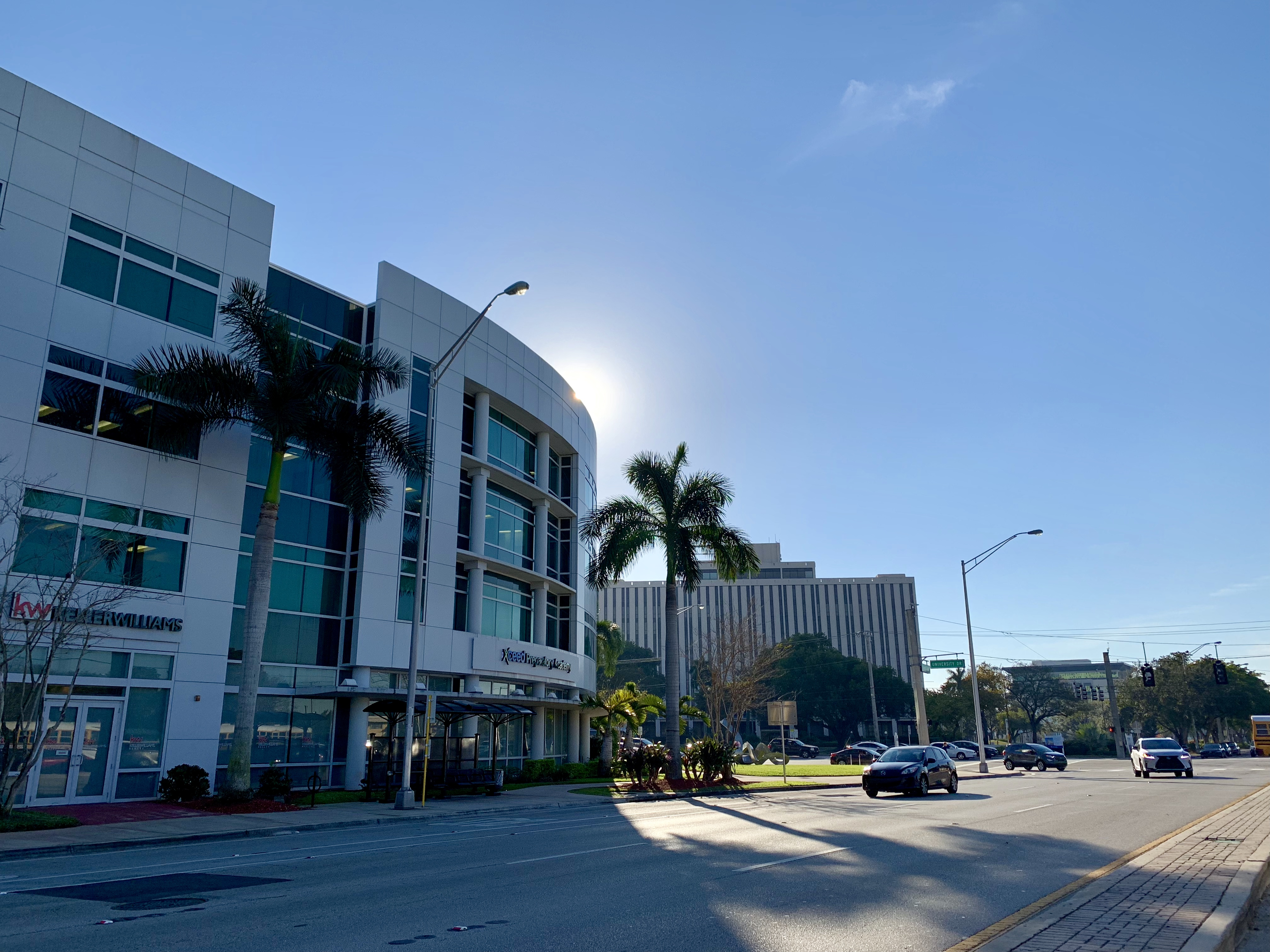
- Downtown Coral Springs (2019)

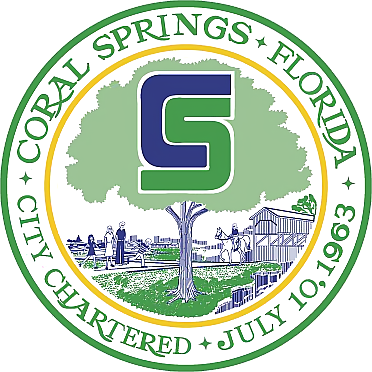
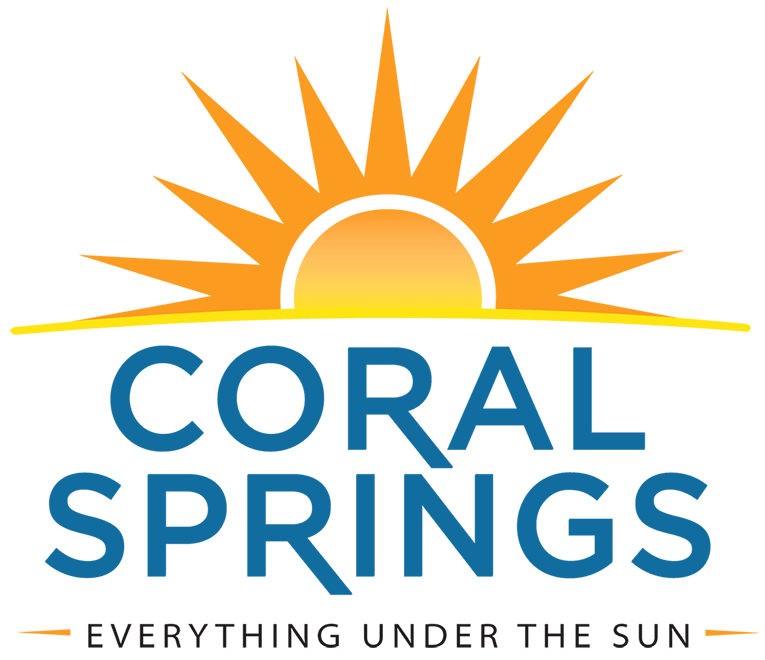
- Flag Seal
- Motto: "Everything Under the Sun!" (Note: Formerly, the city's motto was: "Community of Excellence!")
- Coordinates: 26°16′14″N 80°15′33″W
- Country: United States
- State: Florida
- County: Broward
- Incorporated: July 10, 1963

Government
  - Type: Commission-Manager

Area
  - Total: 23.99 sq mi (62.13 km^{2})
  - Land: 22.86 sq mi (59.22 km^{2})
  - Water: 1.12 sq mi (2.91 km^{2})
- Elevation: 10 ft (3.0 m)

Population (2020)
  - Total: 134,394
  - Density: 5,878/sq mi (2,269/km^{2})
- Time zone: UTC−5 (EST)
  - Summer (DST): UTC−4 (EDT)
- Zip Codes: 33065, 33067, 33071, 33073, 33075, 33076, 33077
- Area codes: 754 and 954
- FIPS code: 12-14400
- GNIS feature ID: 2404127
- Website: CoralSprings.gov

Coral Springs is a city in Broward County, Florida, United States. As of the 2020 census, Coral Springs had a population of 134,394. Approximately 20 miles (32 km) northwest of Fort Lauderdale, it is a principal city of the Miami metropolitan area. It has an arts center, history museum, hosts the "Our Town" annual festival, and has Florida's only covered bridge.

The city, officially chartered on July 10, 1963, was master-planned and primarily developed by Coral Ridge Properties, Inc., which was acquired by Westinghouse in 1966. The city's name is derived from the company's name, and was selected after several earlier proposals had been considered and rejected. Despite the name, there are no natural springs in the city; Florida's springs are found in the central and northern portions of the state.

During the 1970s, 1980s, and 1990s the young city grew rapidly, adding over 35,000 residents each decade. Coral Springs has strict building codes designed to maintain the city's distinctive aesthetic appeal. The city government's effective fiscal management has maintained high bond ratings, and the city has won accolades for its overall livability, its low crime rate, and its family-friendly orientation.

== History ==
Coral Springs is a planned community. Prior to its incorporation as a city in July 1963, the area which is now Coral Springs was part of 20,000 acres (81 km^{2}) of marshy lands bought by Henry Lyons between 1911 and 1939. After several floods in 1947, Florida created the Central and Southern Florida Flood Control District (now the South Florida Water Management District). Canals and levees drained much of the area upon which Coral Springs was built. After the land was drained and cleared, most of the area was used as a bean farm. After Lyons' death in 1952, his heirs changed the focus to cattle.

A post-World War II real estate boom in South Florida attracted the interest of developers. Coral Ridge Properties, which already had several developments in Broward County, bought 3,869 acres (16 km^{2}) of land from the Lyons family on December 14, 1961, for $1 million. The City of Coral Springs was chartered on July 10, 1963. Other names that were considered for the new city included "Curran Village", "Pompano Springs" and "Quartermore". By 1964, the company had developed a master plan for a city of 50,000 residents. On July 22, 1964, the first sale of 536 building lots netted $1.6 million. The landmark covered bridge was built that same year to promote the town. In 1965, Coral Ridge Properties bought an additional 6,000 acres (24 km^{2}) from the Lyons family, increasing the city's land area to 16 square miles (41 km^{2}). The first city government elections were held in 1967.

The city added 19 public schools, a regional mall, shopping centers and parks between 1970 and 2000 in response to rapid population growth. The biggest shopping mall in the city is Coral Square, which opened in October 1984 with 945,000 square feet (87,800 m^{2}) of retail space and more than 120 stores. The construction of the Sawgrass Expressway in 1986 brought even more growth. A museum and a theater opened in the 1990s. The city reached residential build-out in 2003 and is very close to a commercial build-out.

== Geography ==
According to the U.S. Census Bureau, the city has a total area of 24.0 square miles (62.1 km^{2}), 23.8 square miles (61.6 km^{2}) of which is land and 0.19 square miles (0.5 km^{2}) of which is water (0.83%). Coral Springs is bordered by the cities of Parkland to the north, Coconut Creek to the east, Margate and North Lauderdale to the southeast and Tamarac to the south. To the west lie The Everglades.

=== Cityscape ===
Coral Springs is a sprawling city, with few tall or prominent structures. The tallest building in the city is a 12-story condominium (Country Club Tower), with five more buildings topping out at or near 10 stories, including four office buildings lining University Drive, one of the city's main roads. Buildings include the University Place at City Center, Coral Springs Executive Tower, Bank of America Center, and the Briarwood Towers. The Coral Springs Financial Plaza was the first major office building in the city; built in 1974 as the Bank of Coral Springs Building, it had 10 floors and 123,469 sq ft of office space; it was demolished in 2021. University Place at City Center, at 3111 N. University Drive, is the largest office building in the city in terms of office space—it has 10 floors and 203,000 sq ft (18,900 m^{2}). It opened as the Preferred Exchange Tower in 1985.

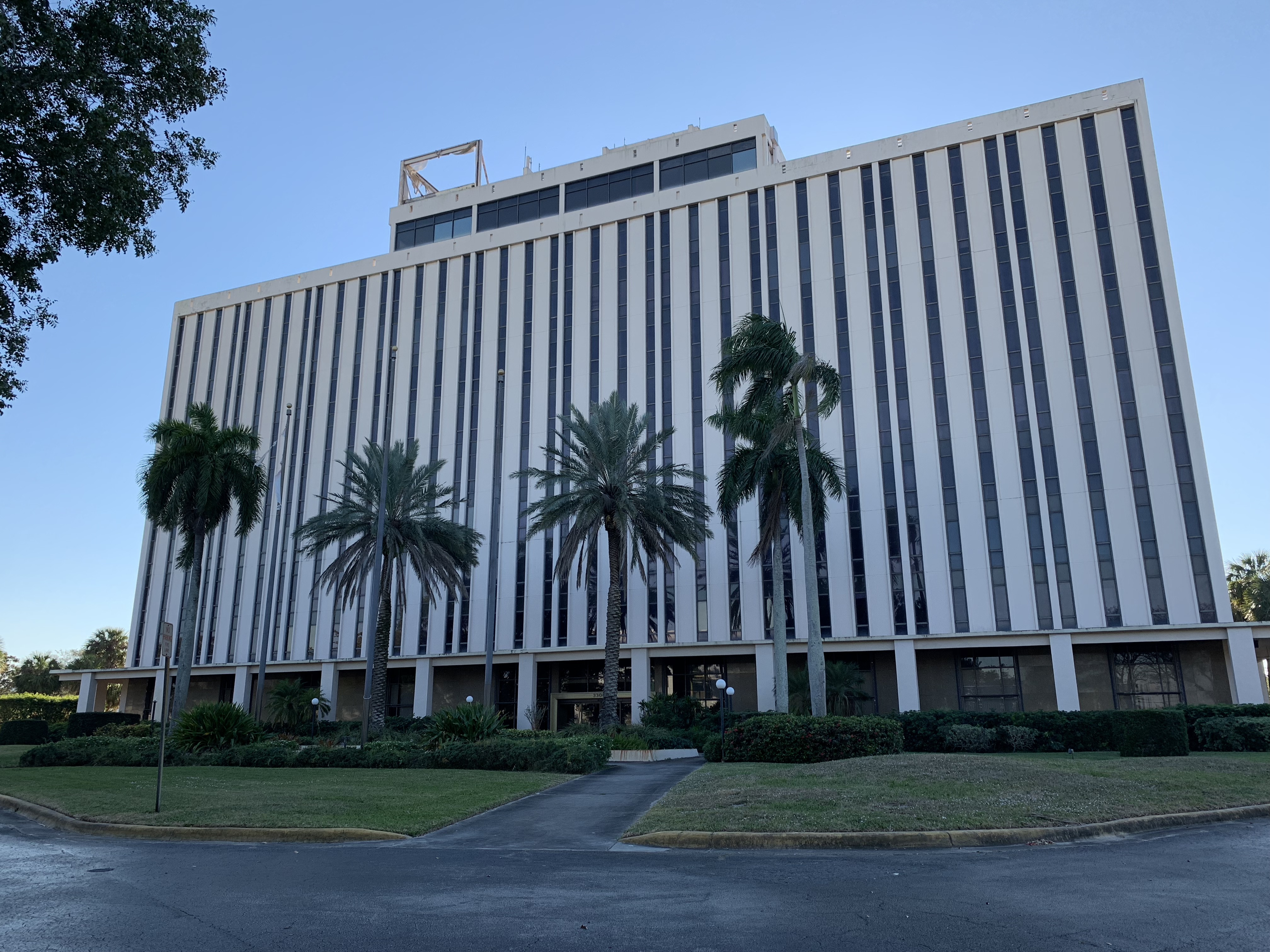
Completed in 1974, the 10-story Coral Springs Financial Plaza was the tallest building west of Interstate 95 in Broward County. The building was demolished in 2021.

Coral Ridge Properties established strict landscaping and sign laws for the city—a question in the original version of Trivial Pursuit noted that the city hosted the first McDonald's without the distinctive Golden Arches sign. Restrictions on commercial signs, exterior paint colors, roofing materials, recreational vehicle and boat storage, and landscaping specifications are all strictly enforced; consequently, real estate values in the city are significantly higher than the county as a whole. In 2006, the median price of a single family home in Coral Springs was US$415,000, while the median price county-wide was US$323,000.

The city's downtown at the intersection of Sample Road and University Drive is the focus of an extensive redevelopment plan, estimated to cost close to US$700 million. The plan to revitalize the city's core started with an open-air shopping and entertainment center—"The Walk"—and progressed with the construction of "One Charter Place", opened April 2007. When completed, the redeveloped downtown area will offer office, retail, and a new government center, encompassing approximately three million square feet of floor space, in addition to approximately 1,000 residential units and a new hotel. The city's new $38 million city hall complex opened in January 2018, replacing the old building which was demolished later that year. The current downtown project in development, "Cornerstone Downtown Coral Springs", will feature two residential towers, a hotel, and a shopping, office and entertainment complex. The project began construction in 2022, following the demolition of the Coral Springs Financial Plaza at the end of 2021.

The City of Coral Springs' Parks and Recreation Department operates over 50 municipal parks, including a water park and a skate park, encompassing over 675 acres (2.7 km^{2}). Coral Springs' largest park is Mullins Park (70 acres). Of the four natural conservation areas in the city, Sandy Ridge Sanctuary is the biggest, at 38 acres (150,000 m^{2}).

=== Climate ===
Coral Springs experiences a tropical rainforest climate (Köppen climate classification: Af). Average monthly rainfall is higher from April to September, with January and February as the driest months. The average monthly rainfall ranges from 2.8 inches (7 cm) in January and February to 7.3 inches (19 cm) in June. The hurricane season is from June to November, with September as the month during which hurricanes are most likely to occur. The most powerful hurricane to strike Coral Springs since its incorporation was Wilma in 2005; the eye of the hurricane passed directly over the city. The city estimated that "as a result of the numerous hurricanes and storms that hit Coral Springs in 2004/2005, and especially as a result of Hurricane Wilma, the tree canopy coverage throughout the city has been reduced by about one third". A 2017 study put Coral Springs in fourth place for US cities most vulnerable to coastal flooding, with 115,000 residents living within FEMA's coastal floodplain.

Climate data for Coral Springs, FL, extremes 1991-2004
Month	Jan	Feb	Mar	Apr	May	Jun	Jul	Aug	Sep	Oct	Nov	Dec	Year
Record high °F (°C)	89 (32)	88 (31)	92 (33)	94 (34)	99 (37)	98 (37)	100 (38)	98 (37)	97 (36)	94 (34)	91 (33)	87 (31)	100 (38)
Mean daily maximum °F (°C)	76 (24)	77 (25)	80 (27)	83 (28)	87 (31)	90 (32)	92 (33)	92 (33)	91 (33)	87 (31)	82 (28)	78 (26)	85 (29)
Mean daily minimum °F (°C)	58 (14)	58 (14)	62 (17)	66 (19)	71 (22)	74 (23)	75 (24)	75 (24)	74 (23)	71 (22)	66 (19)	61 (16)	68 (20)
Record low °F (°C)	32 (0)	36 (2)	39 (4)	49 (9)	52 (11)	67 (19)	67 (19)	67 (19)	66 (19)	57 (14)	47 (8)	36 (2)	32 (0)
Average precipitation inches (mm)	2.78 (71)	2.76 (70)	3.00 (76)	3.40 (86)	5.73 (146)	7.31 (186)	5.94 (151)	6.91 (176)	7.01 (178)	5.73 (146)	4.24 (108)	2.46 (62)	57.27 (1,455)
Source 1:
Source 2:

== Demographics ==
Historical population
Census	Pop.	Note	%±
1970	1,489		—
1980	37,349		2,408.3%
1990	79,443		112.7%
2000	117,549		48.0%
2010	121,096		3.0%
2020	134,394		11.0%
U.S. Decennial Census

Historical demographics	2020	2010	2000	1990	1980
White (non-Hispanic)	36.8%	51.6%	69.9%	87.3%	95.3%
Hispanic or Latino	29.4%	23.5%	15.5%	7.1%	3.0%
Black or African American (non-Hispanic)	22.5%	17.1%	8.9%	3.2%	0.8%
Asian and Pacific Islander (non-Hispanic)	5.6%	5.1%	3.6%	2.0%	1.0%
Native American (non-Hispanic)	0.1%	0.1%	0.1%	0.2%	1.0%
Some other race (non-Hispanic)	1.4%	0.6%	0.4%	0.1%	1.0%
Two or more races (non-Hispanic)	4.3%	2.0%	1.6%	N/A	N/A
Population	134,394	121,096	117,549	79,443	37,349

=== 2010 and 2020 census ===
Coral Springs – Racial and ethnic composition Note: the US Census treats Hispanic/Latino as an ethnic category. This table excludes Latinos from the racial categories and assigns them to a separate category. Hispanics/Latinos may be of any race.
Race / Ethnicity (NH = Non-Hispanic)	Pop. 2000	Pop. 2010	Pop. 2020	% 2000	% 2010	% 2020
White (NH)	82,149	62,496	49,517	69.88%	51.61%	36.84%
Black or African American (NH)	10,412	20,713	30,197	8.86%	17.10%	22.47%
Native American or Alaska Native (NH)	147	167	147	0.13%	0.14%	0.11%
Asian (NH)	4,117	6,091	7,440	3.50%	5.03%	5.54%
Pacific Islander or Native Hawaiian (NH)	79	54	42	0.07%	0.04%	0.03%
Some other race (NH)	495	690	1,846	0.42%	0.57%	1.37%
Two or more races or Multiracial (NH)	1,917	2,443	5,733	1.63%	2.02%	4.27%
Hispanic or Latino (any race)	18,233	28,442	39,472	15.51%	23.49%	29.37%
Total	117,549	121,096	134,394	100.00%	100.00%	100.00%

As of the 2020 United States census, there were 134,394 people, 42,504 households, and 32,507 families residing in the city.

As of the 2010 United States census, there were 121,096 people, 40,975 households, and 32,256 families residing in the city.

=== 2000 census ===
As of 2000, 19,151 (43.2%) households had children under the age of 18 living with them, 26,875 (60.6%) were married couples living together, 7,663 (17.3%) had a female householder with no husband present, and 8,387 (18.9%) were non-families. 5,922 of all households (13.4%) were made up of individuals, and 1,408 (3.2%) had someone living alone who was 65 years of age or older. The average household size was 3.11 and the average family size was 3.45.

In 2000, the city's age distribution was as follows: 38,335 residents (27.8%) under the age of 18, 14,560 (10.5%) from 18 to 24, 35,927 (26.0%) from 25 to 44, 39,821 (28.8%) from 45 to 64, and 9,358 (6.8%) who were 65 years of age or older. The median age was 35.7 years. For every 100 females, there were 93.5 males. For every 100 females age 18 and over, there were 85.7 males.

In 2000, the median income for a household in the city was US$69,808, and the median income for a family was $76,106. Males had a median income of $47,427 versus $34,920 for females. The per capita income for the city was $29,285. About 5.8% of families and 7.3% of the population were below the poverty line, including 11.1% of those under age 18 and 2.1% of those age 65 or over.

As of 2000, those who spoke only English at home accounted for 74.6% of residents. Other languages spoken at home included Spanish (15.0%), French Creole (2.2%), Portuguese (1.4%), French (1.1%), and Italian (0.8%.)

As of 2000, 2.1% of the city's population was from Haiti, 2.1% of the population was from Colombia, and 1.7% of the population was from Cuba.

=== Crime ===
Coral Springs enjoys a low crime rate, and was listed as 24th on the list of Florida's Safest Cities of 2020, by the independent review site SafeWise.

== Economy ==
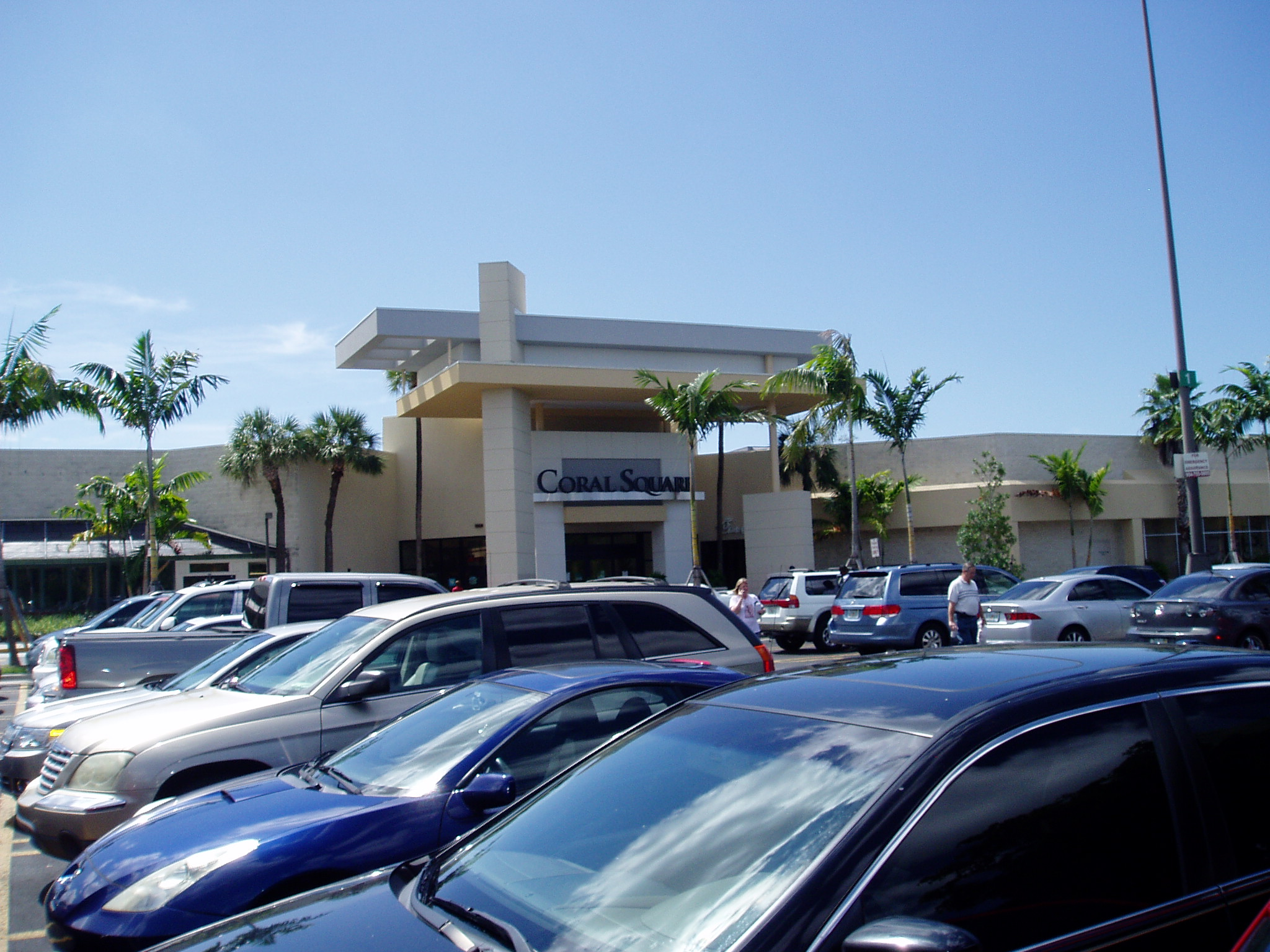
Coral Square

=== Employment ===
Of residents aged 16 years and over, 72.6% were in the labor force, 95% were employed and 5% unemployed. 39.5% of the population worked in management, professional, and related occupations; 32.9% in sales and office occupations; 12.8% in service occupations; 7.6% in construction, extraction, and maintenance occupations; 7% in production, transportation, and material moving occupations; and 0.1% in farming, fishing, and forestry occupations. The industries for which Coral Springs inhabitants worked were 17.6% educational, health and social services; 16.1% retail trade; 12.9% professional, scientific, management, administrative, and waste management services; 10.1% finance, insurance, real estate, and rental and leasing; 8.2% arts, entertainment, recreation, accommodation and food services; 7.0% manufacturing; 6.6% construction; 5.0% wholesale trade; 4% transportation, warehousing, and utilities;, 4.9% other services (except public administration); 3.7% information; 3.6% public administration; and 0.2% agriculture, forestry, fishing and hunting, and mining. 85.2% of workers worked in the private sector, 9.6% in government, 5% self-employed in unincorporated businesses, and 0.3% as unpaid family workers. The predominant method of commuting was driving alone in own car, accounting for 81.5% of commuting trips, followed by 11.2% who were carpoolers and 7.4% who used other methods or worked from home.

=== Credit ratings ===
As of November 2015, Fitch Ratings and Standard & Poor's gave the city's General Obligation bonds a bond credit rating of AAA, while Moody's rates the bonds AA1 after a downgrade in 2014. In its 2015 report, Fitch noted that "financial operations and reserve levels remain sound despite economic pressure that led to reserve draws in prior years."

=== Property taxes ===
As of 2017, the city's property tax rate of 5.87 mils (0.587% of assessed value per year) was the second lowest of large cities in Broward County. This rate is in addition to taxes due to Broward County, which has one of the highest property tax rates in the United States.

=== Major employers ===
Fiserv and Alliance Entertainment are the largest companies that have offices in the Corporate Park of Coral Springs. ABB Asea Brown Boveri and Royal Plastics Group have subsidiaries headquartered in the city.

== Arts and culture ==
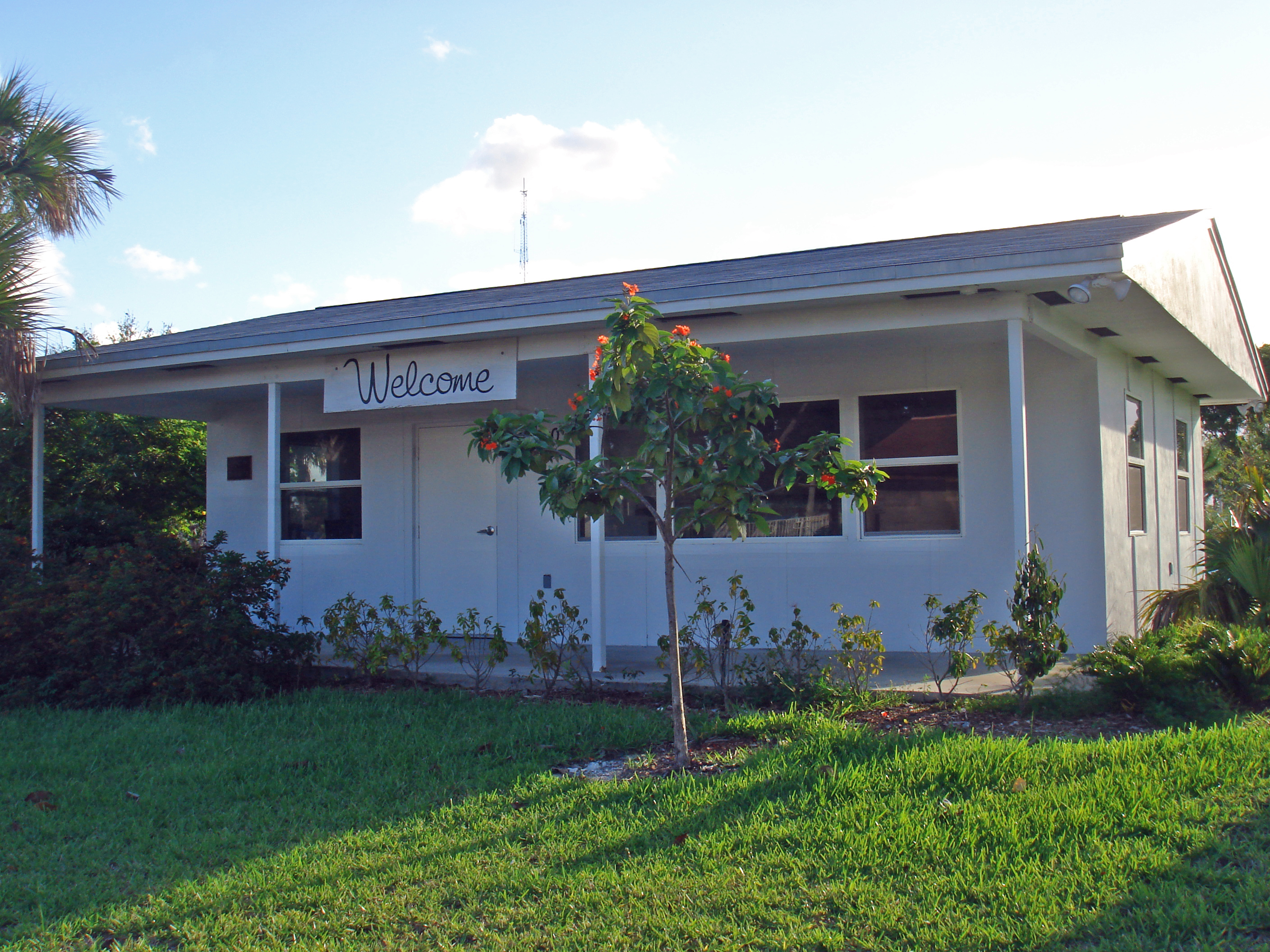
The Museum of Coral Springs History started as a real estate office

The Coral Springs Center for the Arts opened in 1990. Originally planned to be a gymnasium, a US$4 million renovation in 1996 added a 1,471 seat theater. The theater presents a program of popular shows and a yearly Broadway series. The 8,000-square-foot (700 m^{2}) Coral Springs Museum of Art has a small number of exhibits and focuses on art classes and programs for the local community. There is currently one public library in the city, the Northwest Regional Library, affiliated with the county-wide Broward County Library system.

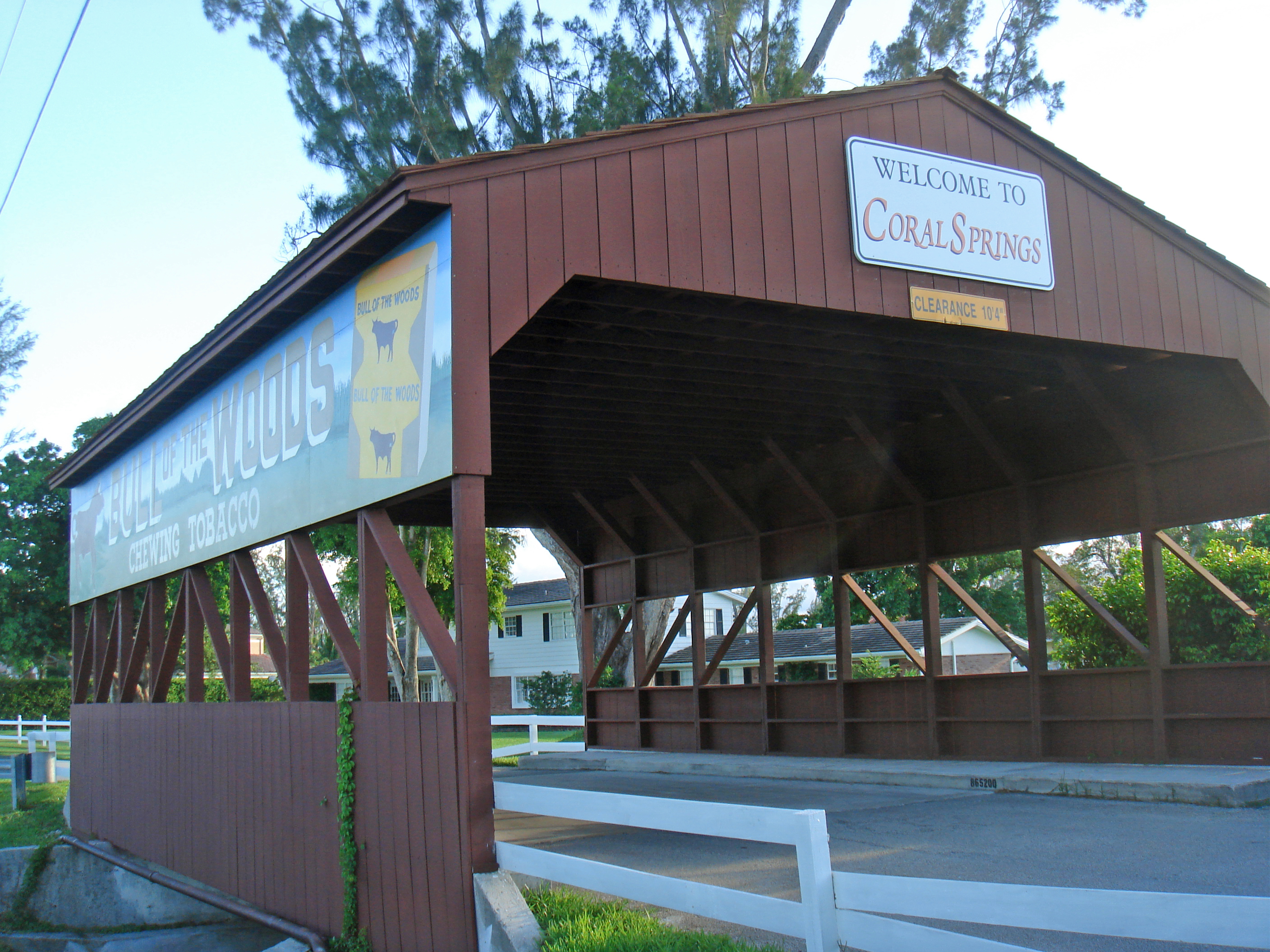
The Covered Bridge was the first permanent structure in the city

The "Our Town" Festival has been continuously held since 1979, first sponsored by the Coral Springs Chamber of Commerce, and promoted by a non-profit organization since 1997. The event has a car show, a beauty pageant and carnival rides. The festival attracted more than 100,000 attendees in 1984, and the city estimated 200,000 visitors at the 1990 event. A parade was added to the event in 1985; since 1994, the parade has been run as a separate event during the Christmas season. Several other festivals are held throughout the year, such as "Fiesta Coral Springs", a Hispanic culture celebration, and the Festival of the Arts. At Coral Springs' 25th Anniversary Party, the Guinness World Record for "Largest Hamburger and Milkshake" was broken on July 10, 1988. The hamburger measured 26 feet (8 m) in diameter and weighed 5063 pounds. The record stood for just over a year.

Coral Springs has two designated Florida Heritage sites. The Coral Springs Covered Bridge was the first structure built in the city, in 1964. The steel bridge, 40 feet (12 m) in length, is the only covered bridge in Florida in the public right-of-way. The American Snuff Company provided two historical designs for the bridge sides, to make the structure appear aged. The Covered Bridge is depicted in Coral Springs' seal. The Museum of Coral Springs History started as a real estate office. Built outside the city limits, the single-room wooden structure was moved to Coral Springs and became its first administration building. Later it was used as the first police station, and as a Jaycees clubhouse; it was moved to the city dump in 1976, where it was used as a fire department training site for smoke drills. After it was inadvertently set on fire, public outcry prompted the building's relocation to Mullins Park for restoration. Since 1978, it has housed the city's history museum. The exhibits in the museum are historic items and city models.

The band New Found Glory hails from Coral Springs and was formed in the city.

== Parks and recreation ==
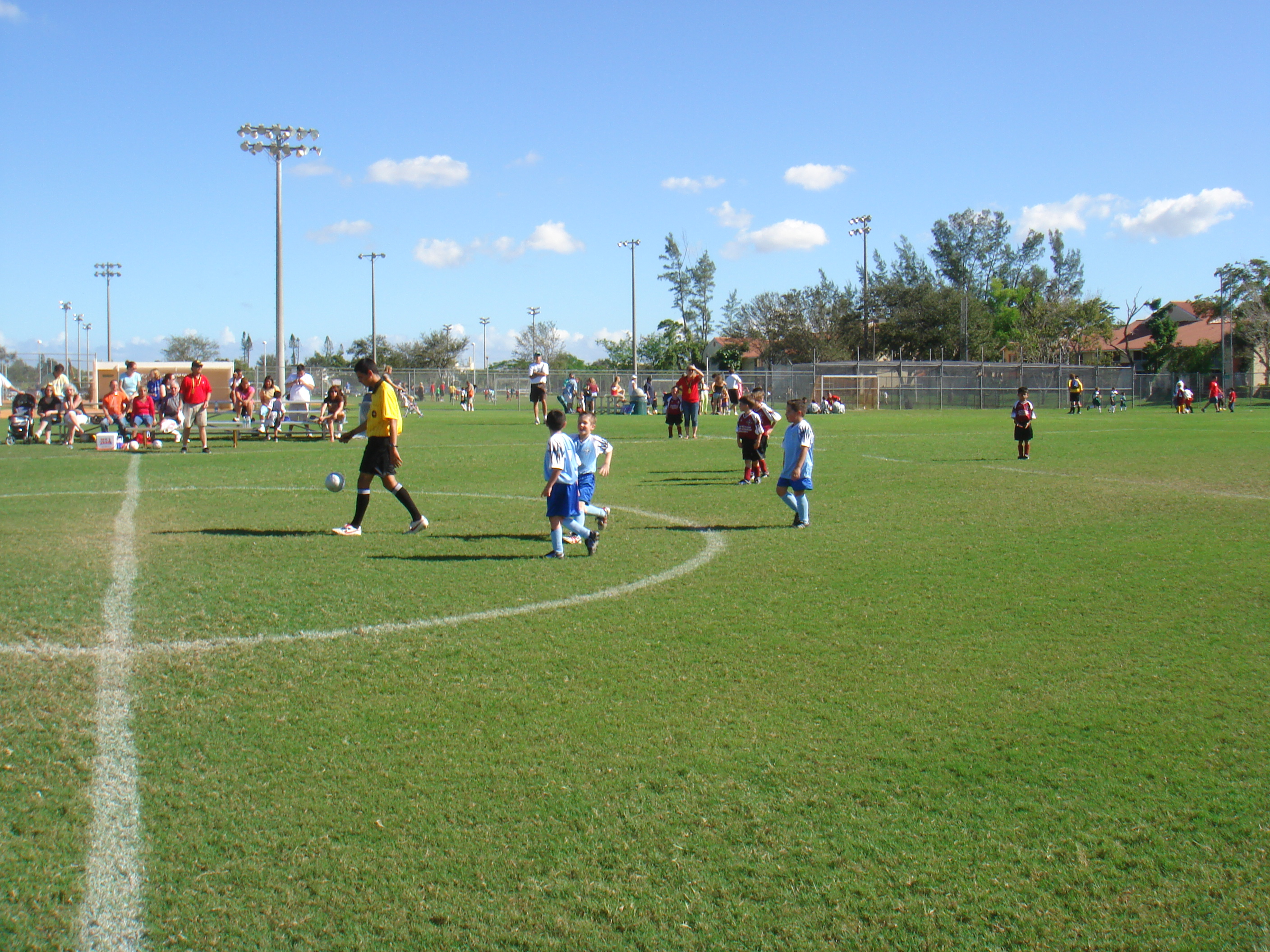
Coral Springs Youth Soccer League Game, Cypress Park

Coral Springs is the current training home of the Florida Panthers NHL team, and has more than 25 amateur sports leagues. Coral Springs Youth Soccer has more than 3,000 players, playing for 284 teams in 20 separate leagues, divided by age group and sex. The Honda Classic golf tournament was played at the TPC at Eagle Trace from 1984 to 1991 and 1996 and then at the TPC at Heron Bay from 1997 to 2002. The short-lived professional soccer team Coral Springs Kicks (USISL) was based in the city.

The regional Sportsplex has a jogging path, an aquatic center, tennis courts, ice rinks and a dog park. The NHL's Florida Panthers conduct much of their training at the Saveology Iceplex, part of the Sportsplex. The International Tennis Championships—an ATP International Series men's tennis tournament was held at the Sportsplex from 1993 to 1998.

North Springs Little League, located in north Coral Springs, won the 2017 U.S. southeast regional senior league championship. Beyond this, they came out of the U.S. pool in the world series and played a game against Panama, which was broadcast on ESPN 2, in the championship game. North Springs little league lost the final game 5–4.

== Government ==
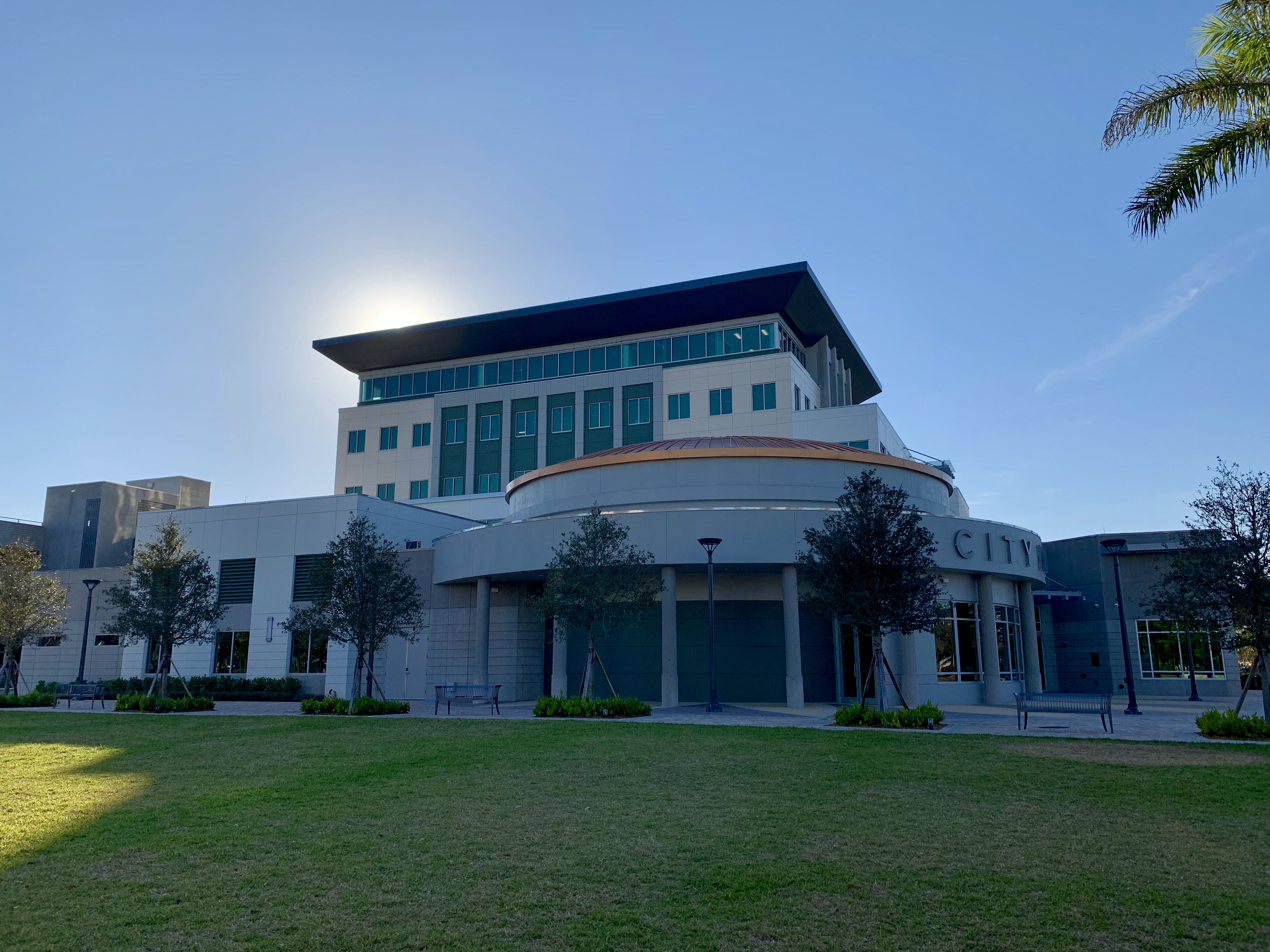
Coral Springs City Hall

Coral Springs uses the commission-manager form of municipal government, with all governmental powers resting in a legislative body called a commission. Coral Springs' commission is composed of five elected commissioners, one of whom is the mayor of the city and another of whom is the vice-mayor. The mayor and vice-mayor serve a two-year term; the commissioners serve four-year terms. The offices are non-partisan; no candidate is allowed to declare a party affiliation. The role of the commission is to pass ordinances and resolutions, adopt regulations, and appoint city officials, including the city manager. While the mayor serves as a presiding officer of the commission, the city manager is the administrative head of the municipal government, and is responsible for the administration of all departments. The mayor is Scott J. Brook and the Vice Mayor is Shawn Cerra. The other commissioners are Joshua Simmons and Joy Carter. Nancy Metayer Bowen was vice-mayor and a commissioner until being killed in a shooting on April 1, 2026. Her husband Stephen Bowen was detained by law enforcement in connection to her death on the same day in near Plantation, Florida, and that the case was being investigated as a domestic violence incident. The City Manager is Franc Babinec.

In 1965, Richard Vedilago became the city's first police chief and the lone officer of the Coral Springs Police Department; six years later, the department had grown to five officers. The department had 200 uniformed police officers in 2003, and 225 police officers in 2022. Gregory Tony, who was later appointed Sheriff of Broward County, was first employed as a police officer by the department, from 2005 to 2016, ultimately becoming a sergeant. Tony resigned from the department in 2016, amid tensions with his superiors regarding his sick leave usage.

== Education ==
According to the 2005 American Community Survey (conducted by the US Census Bureau), 39.2% of all adults over the age of 25 in Coral Springs have obtained a bachelor's degree, as compared to a national average of 27.2% of adults over 25, and 91.7% of Coral Springs residents over the age of 25 have earned a high school diploma, as compared to the national average of 84.2%. Coral Springs had approximately 29,900 students in 2006. Three charter schools offer both primary and secondary education. Higher education is offered by Barry University, Nova Southeastern University and Broward College through a partnership with Coral Springs Charter School.

Public primary and secondary education is handled by the Broward County Public Schools District (BCPS). BCPS operates 3 high schools, 4 middle schools and 12 elementary schools within the city limits. Ramblewood Elementary School received a Florida Sterling Award for its efforts in 2006. In 2008 the Florida Department of Education awarded all public schools in the city, with the exception of Coral Springs High School, "A" grades based on their performance on the Florida Comprehensive Assessment Test. In 2008, Coral Springs High School received a "B," and in 2010 the school received its first "A." In 2009, all public elementary, middle, and charter schools in the city received "A's," except for Broward Community Charter School West, which received a "B."

North Broward Preparatory School maintains a satellite campus in Coral Springs that is currently not in use. The Coral Springs campus has boarding facilities, a playground, and a gymnasium. The school's main campus is in Coconut Creek.

Both Coral Springs Middle School and Forest Glen Middle School were recognized as a "five star" school as of 2017. About 25 schools in Broward County receive this honor. Two other elementary schools in Coral Springs received this rating as well: Maple Wood and Park Springs Elementary School.

== Media ==
Coral Springs is a part of the Miami-Fort Lauderdale-Hollywood media market, which is the twelfth largest radio market and the seventeenth largest television market in the United States. Its primary daily newspapers are the South Florida-Sun Sentinel and The Miami Herald, and their Spanish-language counterparts El Sentinel and El Nuevo Herald.

The city is home to two local weekly newspapers, the Coral Springs Forum and Our Town News. Both publications focus on local issues and human interest stories. The Coral Springs Forum was founded in 1971 by local high school students, the publication was sold after their graduation to local residents. Later the company became a subsidiary of the Tribune Company, the South Florida-Sun Sentinel publisher.

== Infrastructure ==
In-city buses are provided free of charge by the local government. Regional transportation is provided by Broward County Transit. The closest passenger airport and cruise and cargo port to Coral Springs is Port Everglades and Fort Lauderdale-Hollywood International Airport, located 27 miles (43 km) southeast. The only limited-access highway in Coral Springs is the Sawgrass Expressway (State Road 869), which borders the city on its northern and western edges. Major roads in the city include Atlantic Boulevard, University Drive, and Sample Road.

Coral Springs is served by Broward Health, and is home to the 200-bed Coral Springs Medical Center.

Coral Springs' water supply comes from the Biscayne Aquifer, South Florida's primary source of drinking water. There are four different water districts within the city; the providers are the City of Coral Springs Water District, Coral Springs Improvement District, North Springs Improvement District and Royal Utilities. The South Florida Water Management District provides flood control protection and water supply protection to local residents, controls all water shortage management efforts and assigns water restrictions when necessary. Collection and disposal of city's trash or garbage is provided by Waste Pro. Electric power service is distributed by Florida Power & Light.

== Notable people ==
- Eli Abaev (born 1998), American-Israeli basketball player
- Robb Banks (born 1994), rapper
- Brian Benedict (born 1968), soccer player
- Israel Boatwright (born 2005), soccer player
- Karamo Brown (born 1980), actor, television host, reality television
- Darius Butler (born 1986), NFL player
- Greg Cipes (born 1980), actor
- Adam Cole (born 1989), professional wrestler
- Walter Dix (born 1986), sprinter and track-and-field Olympic bronze medalist
- Brandon Duhaime (born 1997), professional NHL ice hockey player
- Matt Ford (born 1981), MLB pitcher
- Chad Gilbert (born 1981), guitarist, vocalist, and founding member of New Found Glory
- Ian Grushka (born 1977), bassist and founding member of New Found Glory
- Stephen Herdsman (born 1975), MLS soccer player
- Steve Hutchinson (born 1977), NFL player
- Max Lazar (born 1999), Major League Baseball pitcher for the Philadelphia Phillies
- Robert Levinson (1948–2020), the longest-held hostage in U.S. history
- Jonathan Lovitz (born 1984), advocate and politician
- Elliott Maddox (born 1947), MLB outfielder
- Dan Morgan (born 1978), NFL football player
- Jared Moskowitz (born 1980), member of the U.S. House of Representatives
- Andrew Pollack (born 1966), author, school safety activist, and entrepreneur
- Hunter Pollack (born 1997), school safety activist and political advisor
- Stacy Ritter (born 1960), member of the Florida House of Representatives
- Anthony Rizzo (born 1989), MLB baseball player for the New York Yankees
- Jackie Sandler (born 1974), actress
- Laine Selwyn (born 1981), professional women's basketball player with Maccabi Ashdod
- Lexi Thompson (born 1995), professional golfer
- Nicholas Thompson (born 1982), professional golfer
- Andrew Torgashev (born 2001), Olympic figure skater
- Misty May-Treanor (born 1977), beach volleyball Olympic gold medalist
- Todd Weiner (born 1975), NFL offensive tackle
- Jeordie White (born 1971), musician
- Sam Young (born 1987), NFL player

== Sister cities ==
Coral Springs is a sister city of Paraíso, Costa Rica.

== See also ==
- Our Lady of Health Syro-Malabar Catholic Church of Miami (1986) mission, (2006) parish
