= Coral Springs Covered Bridge =

Bridge in Florida, United States

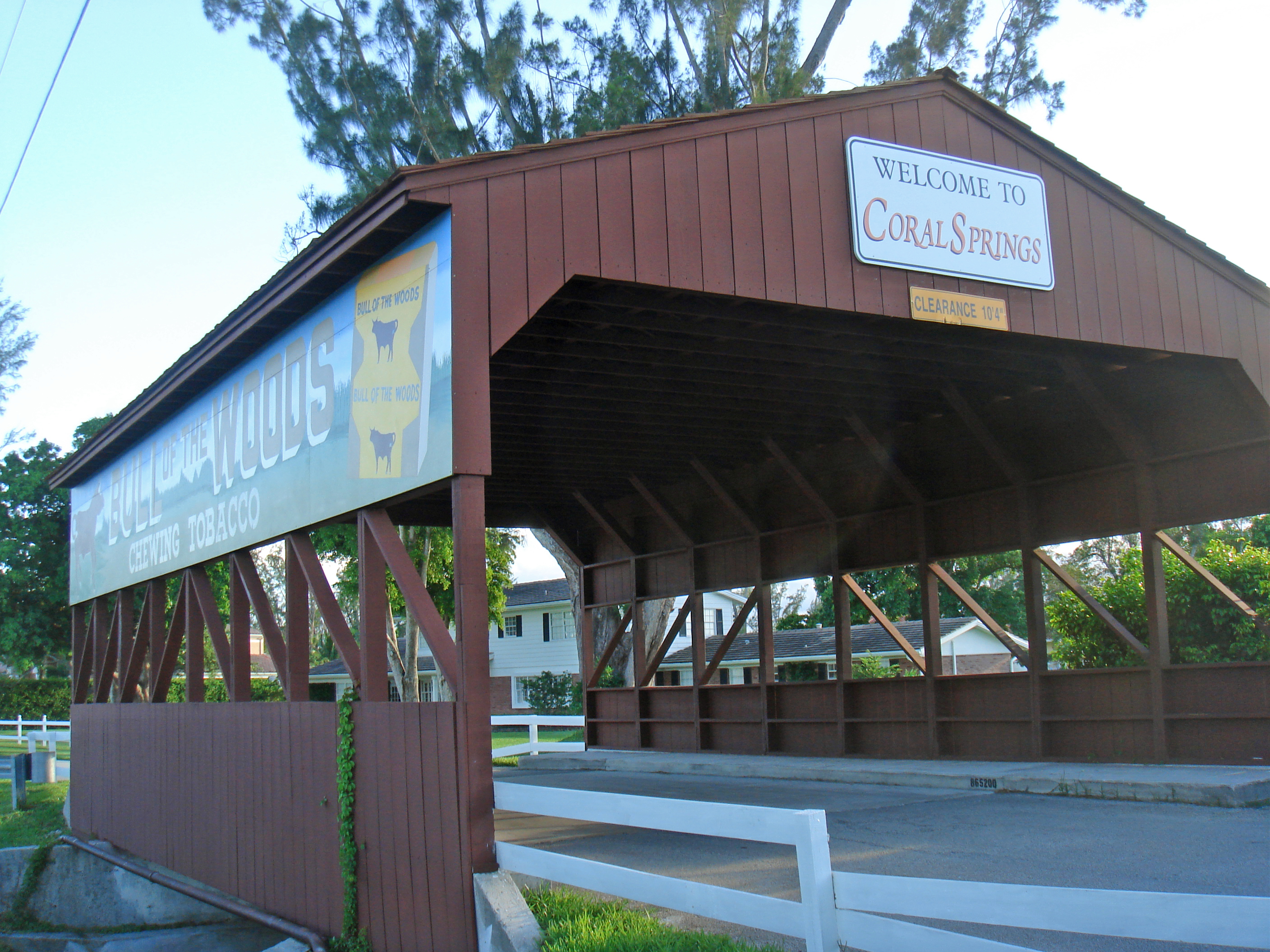
- Coordinates: 26.285918°N 80.253204°W
- Carries: Automobile, pedestrian
- Crosses: Canal
- Locale: Coral Springs, Florida
- Maintained by: City of Coral Springs

Characteristics
- Design: Truss bridge
- Longest span: 40 ft (12.19 m)

History
- Opened: 1964

The Coral Springs Covered Bridge is a 40 ft covered bridge located in Coral Springs, Florida and was the first permanent structure built in the city. The only publicly accessible covered bridge in Florida, it has also been honored with a Florida Heritage Site Marker.

== Structure and design ==
Bridge, circa 1960s

It was designed by George Hodapp and constructed in early 1964 by Lewie Mullins, and George Porter, all employees of Coral Ridge Properties, Inc. The 40-foot bridge has a single steel span that crosses N.W. 95th Avenue just south of Wiles Road. Its roof is composed of 25 truss rafters, cross braces and stringers and is covered with shingles.

Originally painted barn red, James S. Hunt, president of Coral Ridge Properties, wanted to convey a sense of the Old South on the otherwise barren landscape. Hunt's vision for Coral Springs was of a totally planned "City in the Country" with brick colonial-style public buildings, boulevards planted with flowers and the Covered Bridge as its centerpiece.

== History ==
James S. Hunt contacted the American Snuff Company in Winston-Salem, North Carolina, for chewing tobacco designs to make the bridge appear more "seasoned". The company supplied two designs plus an artist to paint the murals. The Bull of the Woods logo on the east side of the bridge was first used in 1876. The Peach Snuff logo on the west side was created in 1950 to appeal to a broader female audience.

When the eye wall of Hurricane Cleo passed over Coral Springs in August 1964, the bridge was left relatively undamaged. In October 2005, Hurricane Wilma passed over the city, and again the structure sustained little damage.

Over the years, the bridge and murals have been restored but are visibly abstruse as trees, (that were planted since after the opening) have grown along the sides of the road and canal. The bridge has the distinction of a Florida Heritage Site Marker in recognition of its architecture and historical significance to the state. The Covered Bridge is depicted in Coral Springs' previous city seal; it is the only covered bridge located on a public right-of-way in the state of Florida.
