= David Beall =

American soccer player (born 1972)

Personal information
- Date of birth: April 8, 1972 (age 54)
- Place of birth: Glendale, California, U.S.
- Height: 5 ft 8 in (1.73 m)
- Position: Midfielder

Youth career
- 1990–1993: University of San Diego

Senior career*
| Years | Team | Apps | (Gls) |
| 1994–1995 | San Diego Sockers (indoor) | 40 | (11) |
| 1996 | Carolina Dynamo | 13 | (1) |
| 1997 | Orange County Zodiac | 3 | (0) |
- * Club domestic league appearances and goals

David Beall is an American retired soccer midfielder who played professionally in the Continental Indoor Soccer League and USISL.

Beall attended the University of San Diego, playing on the men's soccer team from 1990 to 1993. In 1994, Beall signed with the San Diego Sockers of the Continental Indoor Soccer League. On February 7, 1996, the Los Angeles Galaxy selected Beall in the fourteenth round (134th overall) of the 1996 MLS Inaugural Player Draft. The Galaxy released him late in the pre-season. Beall then moved to the Carolina Dynamo of the USISL. In 1997, he played for the Orange County Zodiac.
