= Peter Woodring =

American soccer player and coach (born 1968)

Personal information
- Date of birth: February 5, 1968 (age 58)
- Place of birth: Kentfield, California, United States
- Height: 5 ft 10 in (1.78 m)
- Positions: Forward; midfielder

Youth career
- 1986–1990: Berkeley

Senior career*
Years	Team	Apps	(Gls)
1989	San Francisco Bay Blackhawks		
1991–1992	SV Wiesbaden		
1992–1994	Hamburger SV	6	(0)
1994	Aalborg BK	22	(2)
1995	SV Wehen	11	(0)
1995	Hawaii Tsunami		
1996	New England Revolution	21	(1)
1998	Chico Rooks		
2000–2002	Olympic Club San Francisco		
2003	Bolinas Team		

International career
1993	United States	3	(0)

Managerial career
- 1998–: Berkeley (assistant)
- * Club domestic league appearances and goals

Peter Woodring (born February 5, 1968) is a retired U.S. soccer forward. He spent most of his career in the lower U.S. and German divisions. However, he did spend one season in Major League Soccer with the New England Revolution. He also earned three caps with the U.S. national team in 1993.

== Collegiate career ==
Peter Woodring played college soccer at Berkeley, better known as "Cal", from 1986 to 1990. In 1987 and 1990, he was selected to the All Far West teams, and was the team's MVP in 1987, 1989 and 1990. He holds Cal's single-season record for assists with 12, set as a senior in 1990, and finished his Cal career with 22 goals.

He received his B.A. in International Business.

In 1989, during the college soccer off-season, Woodring played a single season with the San Francisco Bay Blackhawks of the Western Soccer League (WSL). The Blackhawks, along with several other teams in the WSL were essentially semi-pro teams and many top west coast college players played in the league when not playing NCAA soccer.

== Years in Europe ==
When he graduated, the WSL had merged with the east-coast based American Soccer League to form the American Professional Soccer League (APSL). After briefly flourishing in 1990, by 1991 the APSL had less than half the teams remaining from the 1990 season. When one of his college teammates suggested that Woodring pursue a professional career in stable European leagues rather than in the United States he left for Germany for a fall 1991 trial with SV Wiesbaden of the German third division. Woodring played through the 1991–92 season with Wiesbaden, where scouts from first division team Hamburger SV noticed him.

In 1992, Woodring signed with Hamburger SV. However, he had difficulty finding regular playing time with the first team, seeing time in only six matches in 1992–93 and a few more at the start of the 1993–94 season. However, he played most of his games with Hamburger SV's amateur reserve team.

With the possibility of finding regular playing time appearing low, Woodring moved to Danish club Aalborg BK for the last half of the 1993–94 season and the first half of the 1994–95 season. His performances helped propel the club into first place of the Danish Superliga championship, but Woodring left the club halfway through the season, before Aalborg BK eventually won the 1994–95 Danish Superliga title.

He returned to Germany to again play third division football, this time with SV Wehen. He would play 11 games with the team through the end of the 1994–95 season.

== Return to the United States ==
In 1995, Woodring returned to the United States. He played with the Hawaii Tsunami of the USISL. The New England Revolution selected Woodring in the second round of the inaugural MLS draft (15th overall).

He played 21 games, scoring 1 goal, in the 1996 season. On March 10, 1997, The Revs released Woodring during the 1997 preseason, despite his having scored a goal in an exhibition game three days before.

After leaving the Revs, Woodring moved to Marin, California to become a financial analyst. While there, he became an assistant coach on the Berkeley men's soccer team starting in September 1998. He also briefly played with the Chico Rooks of the United Soccer League. In 2000, he scored four goals for the Olympic Club of the San Francisco Soccer Football League's Major Division. In 2003, he played for the Marin Soccer League's Bolinas Team.

== National team ==
Based on initial success with Hamburger SV, Woodring was called up for three games for the US national team in 1993. One game came as a substitute, at the 69th minute in the 1993 U.S. Cup loss to Brazil.

== Post-soccer career ==
Woodring is currently the Senior Vice President and Portfolio Manager at Cephus Capital Management. Before that, he was a Vice President of research and trading at US Trust Company.
