= Phil Wellington =

American soccer player

Personal information
- Date of birth: September 25, 1972 (age 54)
- Place of birth: Fort Lauderdale, Florida, United States
- Height: 6 ft 2 in (1.88 m)
- Position: Goalkeeper

Youth career
- 1991–1994: Georgetown University

Senior career*
Years	Team	Apps	(Gls)
1995	Cocoa Expos		
1996	Richmond Kickers		
1997–1998	Jacksonville Cyclones	34	(0)
- * Club domestic league appearances and goals

Phil Wellington (born September 25, 1972, in Des Moines, Iowa) is a retired U.S. soccer goalkeeper who played collegiately for Georgetown University and professionally in the MLS & USISL.

Wellington graduated from Pine Crest School in Fort Lauderdale, Florida. He attended Georgetown University, where he was the team's starting goalkeeper from 1991 to 1994. He was the 1994 Big East Player of the Year He then played for the Cocoa Expos in the USISL. In February 1996, the Kansas City Wiz selected Wellington in the 11th round (106th overall) of the 1996 MLS Inaugural Player Draft. He injured his back during the pre-season and the Wiz waived him on March 26, 1996. He then signed with the Richmond Kickers for the rest of the 1996 season. In 1997 and 1998, he played for the Jacksonville Cyclones. In 2015, he was inducted into the Georgetown University Athletic Hall of Fame.
