= Wélton (footballer) =

Brazilian footballer (born 1975)

Personal information
- Full name: Wélton Araújo Melo
- Date of birth: 17 April 1975 (age 51)
- Place of birth: Cambuci, Rio de Janeiro, Brazil
- Height: 1.82 m (6 ft 0 in)
- Positions: Striker; midfielder

Senior career*
Years	Team	Apps	(Gls)
1994	Fluminense		
1995	Flamengo		
1995	América (RJ)		
1996	New England Revolution	29	(3)
1997–1998	Los Angeles Galaxy	69	(28)
1999–2000	Miami Fusion	46	(12)
2001	Pittsburgh Riverhounds	25	(6)
2002	Paraná		
2003	Fredrikstad FK	24	(5)
2004–2005	Seattle Sounders	48	(14)

International career
1995	Brazil (youth)	1	(0)
- * Club domestic league appearances and goals

Wélton Araújo Melo (born 17 April 1975 in Cambuci, Rio de Janeiro) is a former Brazilian footballer who played professionally as either a forward or midfielder in South America, Europe and the United States, including five season in Major League Soccer.

== Club career ==
In 1994, Welton began his professional career with Fluminense. In 1996, Major League Soccer invited him to a tryout where he was offered an MLS contract.

=== New England Revolution ===
On March 4, 1996, the New England Revolution selected Welton with their second pick (16th overall) in the 1996 MLS supplemental draft. Playing as both a forward and midfielder, Welton made a total of 29 appearances, starting 20 matches, scoring three goals and recording six assists in the Revolution's inaugural season. He started the Revolution's first-ever match on April 13, 1996, their first-ever win on April 20, and their first-ever home match on April 27. In conjunction with Alexi Lalas, Welton recorded the first assist in New England Revolution history, setting up Robert Ukrop's goal on April 13. He scored his first-ever Revolution goal on May 11 vs. the Columbus Crew. Alongside his teammate Alexi Lalas, Welton was named to the 1996 MLS All-Star Game, where he started in the East's 3-2 victory over the West.

=== LA Galaxy ===
On 10 March 1997, New England traded Welton to the Los Angeles Galaxy for the Galaxy's first round pick in the 1998 MLS Supplemental Draft. Welton became a prolific piece of the Galaxy's attack under head coach Octavio Zambrano, netting 11 goals and recording 3 assists in 29 appearances during the 1997 season. In 1998, the Galaxy scored a league-record 85 goals in the regular season, and Welton finished the season with a career-high 17 goals and 11 assists, second in scoring only to Cobi Jones' 19. For his prolific scoring, Welton was named to the MLS All-Star team for a second time, representing "MLS World" in the 1998 MLS All-Star Game. Welton tallied an additional goal in the Galaxy's 1998 playoff campaign, netting in the MLS Conference Semifinals in the Galaxy's 6-1 win over the Dallas Burn.

=== Later career ===
After making 7 starts in the 1999, the Galaxy traded Welton to the MetroStars in exchange for Roy Myers on June 1. Later that day, the MetroStars sent Welton, Eric Wynalda and Arley Palacios to the Miami Fusion. In April 2001, Welton moved to the Pittsburgh Riverhounds of the USL A-League. In 2002, he played for Paraná and in 2003, he was with and Fredrikstad FK in Norway. On 4 April 2004, Welton moved to the Seattle Sounders of the USL First Division.

Melo currently resides in the Seattle area and plays on a local team.

== International career ==
Welton played once for the Brazil youth team at the 1995 Pan American Games, against Bermuda.

== Honors ==
=== Individual ===
- MLS All-Star: 1996, 1998
