= Coral Springs High School =

Public high school in Coral Springs, Florida, United States

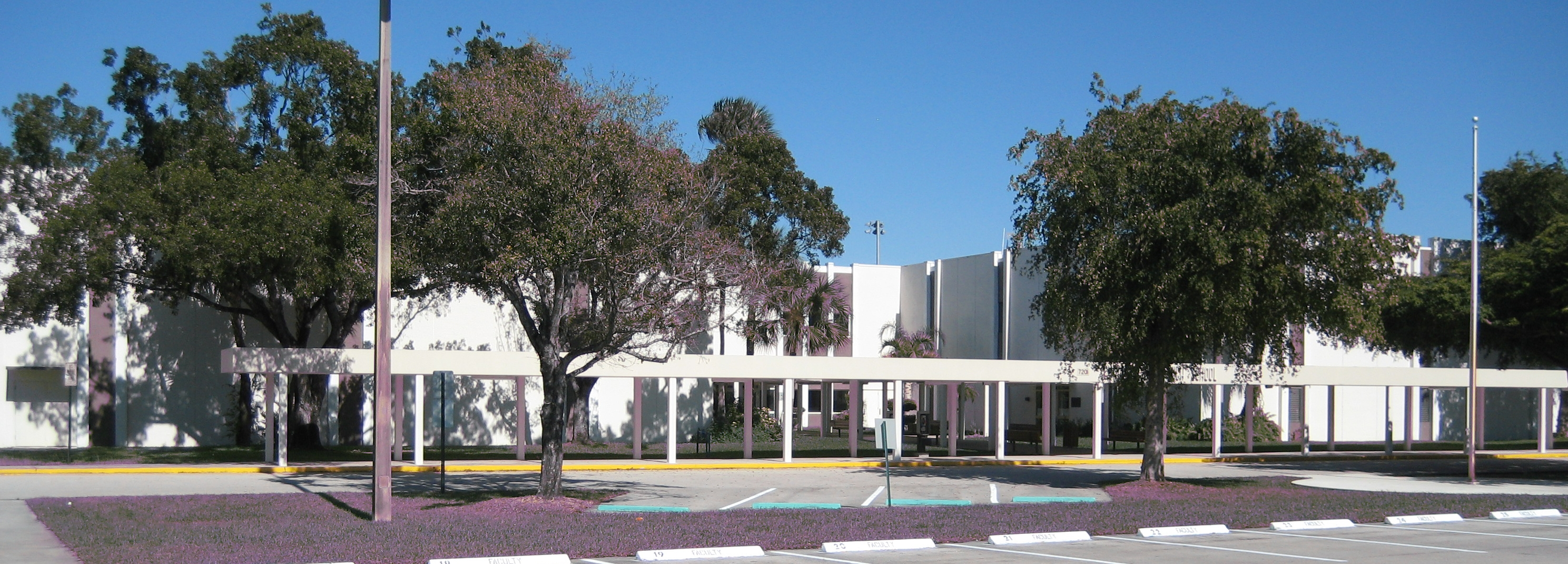

Location
- 7201 W Sample Rd; Coral Springs, Florida, 33065; United States; 26.2736918°N 80.2206029°W

Information
- Type: Public
- Motto: "We are Colts United."
- Established: 1975
- School district: Broward County Public Schools
- Superintendent: Howard Hepburn
- Principal: Dwayne Dixon
- Teaching staff: 10.000 (FTE)
- Grades: 9–12
- Enrollment: 2,320 (2022–2023)
- Student to teacher ratio: 23.20
- Campus: Suburban
- Colors: Blue; Green
- Mascot: Colts
- Rival: Marjory Stoneman Douglas High School
- Newspaper: The Colt Chronicle
- Yearbook: The Equestrian
- Hours: 7:40 –2:40
- Website: www.CoralSpringsHigh.BrowardSchools.com

Coral Springs High School is a public high school located in Coral Springs, Florida, United States. It is a part of the Broward County Public Schools district.

== Demographics ==
As of the 2021–22 school year, the total student enrollment was 2,495. The ethnic makeup of the school was 41.5% White, 50.1% Black, 28.4% Hispanic, 4.3% Asian, 0.4% Pacific Islander, 2.9% Multiracial, and 0.8% Native American or Native Alaskan.

== Notable alumni ==
- Todd Barry, stand-up comedian
- Brian Benedict, professional soccer player
- Lewis Brinson (born 1994), Major League Baseball (MLB) outfielder
- Cody Brown, National Football League (NFL) player
- Casely, singer
- Greg Cipes, voice actor and musician
- Walter Dix, Olympic sprinter
- Steve Hutchinson, NFL Hall of Famer
- Max Lazar (born 1999), Major League Baseball (MLB) pitcher
- George LeMieux, United States Senator from Florida
- Steve Rosenberg (born 1964), Major League Baseball pitcher
- Jackie Sandler, actress
- Jennifer Schwalbach Smith, actress
- Laine Selwyn, Women's National Basketball Association (WNBA) basketball player
- Ski Mask the Slump God, rapper
- Jennifer Taylor, actress
- Ezenwa Ukeagu, professional basketball player
- Phil Varone, drummer
