= Walter Bustamante =

American retired soccer midfielder

Personal information
- Position: Midfielder

Youth career
- 1991–1994: Long Island University

Senior career*
| Years | Team | Apps | (Gls) |
| 1995 | Jersey Dragons | | |
| 1998–1999 | New Jersey Stallions | | (5) |
- * Club domestic league appearances and goals

Walter Bustamante is an American retired soccer midfielder who played professionally in the USISL.

Bustamante attended Long Island University where he was a 1993 First Team All American soccer player and the 1994 Northeast Conference Player of the Year. He holds the university's career record for assists. In 1995, he played for the Jersey Dragons. In February 1996, the MetroStars selected Bustamante in the sixteenth round (156th overall) of the 1996 MLS Inaugural Player Draft. The MetroStars waived him on March 26, 1996. In 1998 and 1999, he played for the New Jersey Stallions. After his career in soccer, he began teaching a middle school Spanish course at Our Lady of Good Counsel Catholic School in 2016, but left in June 2018. He now works at Saint Michael Catholic School in Annandale, VA as a PE and Spanish teacher.
