= Brian Benedict =

American soccer player (born 1968)

Personal information
- Date of birth: December 27, 1968 (age 57)
- Position: Forward

Youth career
- 1982–1986: Coral Springs High School

College career
| Years | Team | Apps | (Gls) |
| 1986–1989 | Duke University | | |

International career
| 1985 | United States U17 | | |
| 1987 | United States U20 | | |
| 1991–1992 | United States | 4 | |

Brian Benedict (born December 27, 1968) is an American former soccer player who played as a forward. Benedict played high school soccer at Coral Springs High School, and was a significant player with the U.S. national youth teams and earned four caps with the United States national team in 1991 and 1992.

== College career ==
Benedict, a product of the Coral Springs, Florida soccer community, attended Duke University where he played on the men's soccer team from 1986 to 1989. The Blue Devils won the NCAA Men's Soccer Championship in 1986, his freshman season. In 1988, he was named a first team All American.

== Club career ==
After graduating from college, Benedict played amateur soccer for the Lauderhill Lions in the Florida Gold Coast League. He later played for the Boca Raton Sabres in the United States Interregional Soccer League.

== International career ==
=== Youth teams ===
Benedict was a member of the U.S. national youth teams at the 1985 FIFA U-16 World Championship. The U.S. went 1-0-2 in group play and did not qualify for the second round. Two years later, he was part of the U.S. team at the 1987 FIFA World Youth Championship. Once again, the U.S. went 1-0-2 in group play and did not make the second round.

=== Senior team ===
Benedict earned his first of four caps in a 1–0 loss to Jamaica on September 14, 1991. He came on for Chris Henderson in the 46th-minute. His next three caps all came in February 1992, his last in a 2–0 loss to El Salvador on February 18, 1992.
