= Alan Prampin =

American soccer player

Personal information
- Date of birth: November 30, 1971 (age 54)
- Place of birth: Dallas, Texas, United States
- Height: 5 ft 7 in (1.70 m)
- Position: Forward

Youth career
- 1990–1993: Southern Methodist University

Senior career*
Years	Team	Apps	(Gls)
1994	Dallas Sidekicks	8	(7)
1995	Raleigh Flyers		
1996	Kansas City Wiz	15	(3)
1997–1999	Tampa Bay Mutiny	59	(14)

International career
1993	United States	2	(0)
- * Club domestic league appearances and goals

Alan Prampin (born November 30, 1971) is a former U.S. soccer forward who spent one season in the Continental Indoor Soccer League, one in the USISL and four in Major League Soccer. He also earned two caps with the U.S. national team.

== College ==
Prampin attended Southern Methodist University where he played on the men's soccer team from 1990 to 1993. He was selected as a third team All American in 1991, a first team All American in 1992 and second team in 1993. Prampin also started in each of the three games in the World University Games in Buffalo 1993, scoring one goal. He was named an alternate for the U.S. Men's soccer team for the 1992 Olympics.

== Professional career ==
Prampin turned professional with the Dallas Sidekicks of the Continental Indoor Soccer League in 1994 scoring 7 goals in 8 games and was an early candidate for Rookie of The Year before getting a season ending injury. Prampin then spent the 1995 season with the Raleigh Flyers of USISL where he led the team in scoring and was named an offensive All-Star of the Atlantic Division. In February 1996, the Kansas City Wiz of Major League Soccer selected Prampin in the tenth round (96th overall) of the Inaugural Player Draft. His nickname given by Coach Ron Newman was 'supersub' for his ability to score coming off of the bench, scoring 3 goals in only 337 minutes played. On December 15, 1996, the Wiz traded Prampin and a third round supplemental draft pick to the Tampa Bay Mutiny for MLS All-Star Steve Pittman. In his 1997 MLS Season he scored 7 goals and 3 assists. In his 1998 MLS Season, Prampin's 7 game point streak was a team record surpassing Roy Lassiter's previous record and led the team with assists. He was named Tampa Bay Mutiny Honda Most Valuable Player and Tampa Bay Sports Club Most Valuable Player for the 1998 season. In 2000, he was named Tampa Bay Mutiny's Humanitarian of the Year for his work in the community. He remained with the Mutiny until he retired after the 2000 season due to injury.

== National team ==
Prampin played extensively with the U.S. national 'B' team in 1991-1993. In the summer of 1992, Prampin was called up by coach Bora Milutinović when the U.S. Men's National Team played against Australia but did not play. He eventually earned two caps with the U.S. national team. His first was a 2–2 tie with El Salvador on March 23, 1993, when he came on for Cobi Jones in the 89th minute. His second game was two days later, a 4–1 loss to Honduras. He again came on for Cobi Jones, this time in the 83rd minute.
