= Richard Weiszmann =

Slovak-American soccer player and coach

Personal information
- Date of birth: April 8, 1972 (age 54)
- Place of birth: Bratislava, Czechoslovakia
- Height: 6 ft 1 in (1.85 m)
- Position: Defender

Youth career
- 1991–1994: UC Berkeley

Senior career*
Years	Team	Apps	(Gls)
1994	Santa Cruz Surf		
1995	North Bay Breakers		
1996	New England Revolution	10	(0)
1997–1999	Chico Rooks		
- * Club domestic league appearances and goals

Richard Weiszmann (born April 8, 1972) is a Slovak-American retired soccer player who played as a defender. He played for the New England Revolution in 1996 and also spent five seasons in the USISL. As of 2026, he is the MLS Next Director of Coaching with The Town FC Academy (TTFC Academy).

Weiszmann attended the University of California, Berkeley where he played on the men's soccer team from 1991 to 1994. He was an All Far West player in 1993 and 1994. During the 1994 collegiate off season, Weiszmann played for the Santa Cruz Surf of the USISL. In 1995, he played for the North Bay Breakers. In February 1996, the New England Revolution selected Weiszmann in the 10th round of 1996 MLS Inaugural Player Draft. He played ten games for the Revs before being waived on June 30, 1996. He returned to Northern California and signed with the San Jose Clash, but never had a first team game. In 1997, he joined the Chico Rooks of the USISL, playing with the team through the 1999 season. Weiszmann has coached for several years with Diablo Futbol Club (DFC). As of 2026, he is the MLS Next Director at The Town FC Academy (TTFC Academy)
