= Lance Hill (soccer) =

American soccer player

Personal information
- Date of birth: February 17, 1972 (age 54)
- Place of birth: United States
- Height: 6 ft 4 in (1.93 m)
- Position: Forward

Youth career
- 1990–1994: Creighton University

Senior career*
| Years | Team | Apps | (Gls) |
| 1995 | New Orleans Riverboat Gamblers | | |
- * Club domestic league appearances and goals

Lance Hill(born February 17, 1972) is a retired U.S. soccer forward. He spent one season in USISL.

Hill attended Creighton University, where he was part of the men's soccer team from 1990 to 1994. During four seasons, he scored 21 goals and added 20 assists. Hill was inducted into the Creighton Hall of Fame in 2007.

In 1995, Hill played for the New Orleans Riverboat Gamblers. He was named a USISL South Central District Rookie of the Year and a first team All Star. In February 1996, the Colorado Rapids selected Hill in the 11th round (102nd overall) of the 1996 MLS Inaugural Player Draft after an impressive showing in the MLS combine. While he made the preseason roster, he was released before playing a regular season game. In 2004, he played for Legends F.C. in the 2004 U.S. Open Cup.
