= Nyanforth Peters =

Liberian footballer

Personal information
- Date of birth: September 3, 1975 (age 51)
- Place of birth: Liberia
- Height: 5 ft 6 in (1.68 m)
- Position: Forward

Senior career*
Years	Team	Apps	(Gls)
1994–1996	Locarno		
1999	Maryland Mania	3	(0)
- * Club domestic league appearances and goals

Nyanforth Peters (born September 3, 1975) is a Liberian footballer who played as a forward. He was drafted by the Kansas City Wiz in the 1996 MLS Inaugural Player Draft.

== Career ==
According to his Major League Soccer biography, Peters was a 1993 NAIA All American at soccer player at Park College where he scored 25 goals and adding 12 assists in 18 games. However, the NAIA has no record of a Nyanforth Peters gaining All American recognition in 1993 or any other year. He then supposedly left college and moved to Switzerland where he played for FC Locarno. The accuracy of this is unknown. In February 1996, the Kansas City Wiz selected Peters in the 8th round (76th overall) in the 1996 MLS Inaugural Player Draft. However, he never played a game with the Wiz and there is no record of him being waived or released, leading to the conclusion that he never signed with the team. In 1999, he played three games for the Maryland Mania of the USL A-League.
