= Jim Adams (soccer) =

American soccer goalkeeper

Personal information
- Full name: James Adams
- Date of birth: November 16, 1969 (age 56)
- Place of birth: Hamilton Square, Hamilton Township; Mercer County, New Jersey, United States
- Height: 6 ft 0 in (1.83 m)
- Position: Goalkeeper

Team information
- Current team: Cincinnati Excite
- Number: 31

Youth career
- 1988–1989: Mercer County Community College
- 1990–1991: Monmouth University

Senior career*
Years	Team	Apps	(Gls)
1992–1993	Denver Thunder (indoor)	2	(0)
1993	Delaware Wizards		
1993–1995	Dayton Dynamo (indoor)	32	(0)
1995	Chicago Power (indoor)	7	(0)
1995	Columbus Xoggz		
1995–1996	Cleveland Crunch (indoor)	20	(0)
1996	New England Revolution	0	(0)
1996–1997	Columbus Invaders (indoor)	15	(2)
1997	Kansas City Attack (indoor)	4	(0)
1998	Cincinnati Riverhawks	5	(0)
2005–	Cincinnati Excite (indoor)		
- * Club domestic league appearances and goals

Jim Adams (born November 16, 1969) is an American soccer goalkeeper who most recently played for the Cincinnati Excite in the American Indoor Soccer League. He played two seasons in the USISL earlier in his career where he was also the 1995 Goalkeeper of the Year.

Adams attended Mercer County Community College where he played soccer in 1988 and 1989. Mercer won the 1988 Junior College National Championship and Adams was a 1989 junior college All American. He then transferred to Monmouth University, playing soccer there in 1990 and 1991. He holds the school's career record for saves and goals against average. In 1992, he signed with the Denver Thunder in the National Professional Soccer League where he started two games during the 1992–1993 season. In the summer of 1993, he played outdoor soccer with the Delaware Wizards of the USISL then returned to the NPSL with the Dayton Dynamo in the fall of 1993. He played the 1993–1994 season in Dayton, then began the 1994–1995 season before moving to the Chicago Power at the end of the season. In 1995, he played outdoors, and coached, the Columbus Xoggz in the USISL. He both led the USISL with a .71 goals against average and was named Coach of the Year. In the fall of 1995, he moved to the Cleveland Crunch in the NPSL, played one season there. In February 1996, the New England Revolution selected Adams in the 12th round (115th overall) in the 1996 MLS Inaugural Player Draft. The Revolution waived him on May 2, 1996, but recalled him for the playoffs. In the fall of 1996, he was back in the NPSL, this time with the Columbus Invaders. However, he again moved during the season, finishing with the Kansas City Attack. In 1998, he played for the Cincinnati Riverhawks. He last played for the Cincinnati Excite in the American Indoor Soccer League.

On November 22, 2013, Adams was inducted into the Monmouth University Hall of Fame in West Long Branch, New Jersey.
