= Samuel Ekemé =

Cameroonian footballer

Personal information
- Full name: Samuel Ekemé Ndiba
- Date of birth: July 12, 1966 (age 60)
- Place of birth: Kumba, Cameroon
- Height: 5 ft 10 in (1.78 m)
- Position: Defender

Senior career*
Years	Team	Apps	(Gls)
1984–1986	Carmmak Bamenda		
1986–1989	Santos Yaoundé		
1989–1994	Canon Yaoundé		
1994	Racing FC Bafoussam		
1995	Hawaii Tsunami		
1995	Monterrey La Raza (indoor)	6	(0)
1996	Kansas City Wiz	23	(0)
1997–2001	Kansas City Attack (indoor)	139	(32)
1997	Nashville Metros	13	(0)
2003–2004	Kansas City Comets (indoor)	4	(1)

International career
	Cameroon	32	(0)
- * Club domestic league appearances and goals

Samuel Ekemé Ndiba (born July 12, 1966 in Kumba) is a Cameroonian former football player who spent ten seasons in Cameroon, one in Major League Soccer, at least two in the USISL, one in the Continental Indoor Soccer League and five in the National Professional Soccer League / Major Indoor Soccer League. He was a member of the Cameroon national football team at the 1994 World Cup.

== Professional career ==
In 1984, Ekemé signed with Carmmak Bamenda. He moved to Santos Yaoundé in 1986 in the Cameroon First Division and Canon Yaoundé in 1989. He achieved his greatest league success with Canon, winning the 1991 and 1992 league titles and the 1993 Cameroon Cup. In 1995, he moved to the United States and signed with the Hawaii Tsunami in the USISL. Hawaii won the Northwest Division championship and Ekeme was named the Northwest Division Defender of the Year. On August 31, 1995, he signed a two-year contract with the Monterrey La Raza of the Continental Indoor Soccer League. The La Raza won the 1995 CISL championship. In February 1996, Ekemé was drafted by the Kansas City Wiz with the 146th overall pick (15th round) in the inaugural MLS Draft. He played twenty-three games with Kansas City during the 1996 season. On February 26, 1997, he signed with the Kansas City Attack in the National Professional Soccer League. He joined the team just before the playoffs and was a major part in the team's run to the championship title. Ekeme would play next four seasons for the Attack. In the summer of 1997, he played for the Nashville Metros in USISL. He coached the mighty Turner Bears soccer team during the 2001 - 2002 season. He finished his career with four games with the Kansas City Comets during the 2003-2004 Major Indoor Soccer League season.

== National team ==
Ekeme was a member of the Cameroon national football team at the 1994 FIFA World Cup, but did not enter a game during the tournament.
