= Build-out =

Build-out is an urban planner’s estimate of the amount and location of potential development for an area. Sometimes called a "lot-yield analysis", build-out is one step of the land use planning process. Evaluation of potential development impacts begins with a build-out analysis.

== Purpose ==
Performing a build-out analysis identifies the holding capacity of the land. The build-out calculation provides the supply of development for forecasting future land use growth. Land use forecasting or allocation adds demand factors such as economic growth and the land’s relative attractiveness for new development. Land developers perform build-out calculations to assess the profitability of a parcel of land.

Potential impacts can be derived from build-out by multiplying the amount of development by various factors (e.g. calculating the number of new school children, traffic trips and water demand). Note: the multipliers frequently vary by land use type. These figures only provide the raw demand for these facilities and additional analysis is required (e.g. subtracting existing students from school capacity or a traffic study).

== Calculation methods ==
Build-out applies land use or zoning assumptions about density to the available land area. The build-out calculation may deduct land due to physical constraints to development (e.g. sensitive natural resources), potential infrastructure dedications (e.g. streets, public open space, or stormwater management structures), and practical design considerations (e.g. lot layout inefficiencies). Existing buildings may reduce the available capacity for new development. Many times these constraints are not known until well after a build-out calculation is performed.

A build-out calculation multiplies the land area by density factors. Residential density is most often expressed as residential dwelling units per acre (DU/ac), but a minimum lot size is also used (especially in zoning). (Note: outside the United States, the metric system usually uses hectares as the area unit of measurement). A floor area ratio (FAR) typically describes non-residential development, based on the ratio of building floor space to land area, both using the same unit of measure. Additional analysis might estimate the number of buildings or building coverage based on the number of dwelling units per building, the number of stories and/or the building size in square feet.

== Example analysis ==
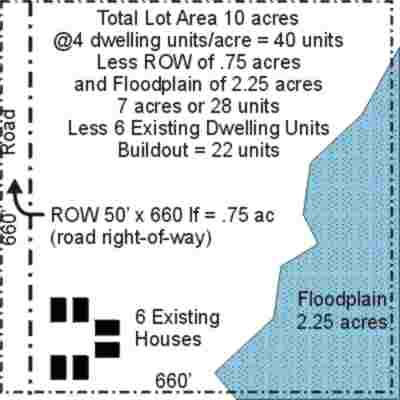
Sample build-out analysis

A typical analysis of build-out might start with 10 acres (40,000 m^{2}) of land with a proposed density of 4 dwelling units per acre.

1. A simple multiplication (10x4) would produce a build-out of 40 units.
2. A more complex analysis might deduct .75 acres (3,000 m^{2}) for 660 feet (200 m) of 50-foot (15 m) road right-of-way (ROW). This leaves 9.25 acres (37,400 m^{2}) with 37 units allowed.
3. The land might contain 2.25 acres (9,100 m^{2}) of flood plain, a constraint to development. Some communities allow the developer to shift the density elsewhere on the property, keeping the total units at 40. Other communities prohibit density shifting, reducing the target number of units to 31 units.
4. Existing structures will limit the number of additional new dwelling units allowed on the land. If an existing subdivision contains 6 dwelling units, the available capacity is 34 units.
5. Combining these dwelling unit deductions (40-3-9-6) equals 22 dwellings units for residential build-out.

== See also ==
- Civil Engineering
- Land use
- Natural landscape
