= Antonio Superbia =

Brazilian-American soccer player and coach

Antonio Superbia Jr
Personal information
- Full name: Antonio Superbia, Jr.
- Place of birth: Bebedouro, São Paulo, Brazil
- Height: 5 ft 8 in (1.73 m)
- Position: Midfielder

Youth career
- 1986: Inter Bebedouro
- 1987: Clube Atlético Juventus
- 1988: Inter Bebedouro
- 1990–1991: Brooklyn College

Senior career*
| Years | Team | Apps | (Gls) |
| 1989–1995 | Brooklyn Italians | | |
| 1995–1996 | Jersey Dragons | | |

Managerial career
- 2000–2006: Brooklyn College
- * Club domestic league appearances and goals

Antonio "Junior" Superbia is a retired Brazilian-American soccer player and coach.

Superbia grew up in Taiuva, Brazil where he played in the Internacional and Clube Atlético Juventus youth systems. In 1989, he moved to the United States to attend Brooklyn College where he played on the men's soccer team in 1990 and 1991. He also played for the Brooklyn Italians in the North Eastern Super Soccer League (NESSL). In 1991, he and his teammates won the 1991 U.S. Open Cup. In 1993, Superbia led the NESSL in scoring.

In 1995, he played for the Jersey Dragons in the USISL. In February 1996, the New England Revolution selected Superbia in the fourteenth round (135th overall) of the 1996 MLS Inaugural Player Draft. The Revolution released him during the pre-season. He returned to the Dragons for the 1996 season.

In July 2000, Brooklyn College hired Superbia to coach the men's soccer team, a position he held until August 2006. He continues to coach in the Brooklyn Italians youth system.
