= Scott Uderitz =

American soccer player

Personal information
- Date of birth: May 17, 1970 (age 56)
- Place of birth: Edmonds, Washington, United States
- Height: 5 ft 10 in (1.78 m)
- Position: Midfielder

College career
Years	Team	Apps	(Gls)
1989–1992	UNLV Rebels		

Senior career*
Years	Team	Apps	(Gls)
1993–1994	Cleveland Crunch (indoor)	14	(0)
1995	Las Vegas Dustdevils (indoor)	23	(7)
1996–1999	Kansas City Wizards	52	(2)
1998	→ MLS Pro 40 (loan)	1	(0)
- * Club domestic league appearances and goals

Scott Uderitz (born May 17, 1970, in Edmonds, Washington) is a retired American soccer midfielder who played one season in the National Professional Soccer League, one in the Continental Indoor Soccer League, and three in Major League Soccer.

Uderitz attended the University of Nevada, Las Vegas where he played on the men's soccer team from 1989 to 1992. In 1993, he signed with the Cleveland Crunch of the National Professional Soccer League. He played fourteen games with the Crunch. He then spent the 1995 summer indoor season with the Las Vegas Dustdevils in the Continental Indoor Soccer League, scoring seven goals in 23 games.

In February 1996, the Kansas City Wiz selected Uderitz in the seventh round (66th overall) in the 1996 MLS Inaugural Player Draft. He played 28 games in 1996, but lost the entire 1997 season after tearing the medial collateral ligament in his right knee. He returned in 1998, starting 18 games out of 22 played. He then only played two games in 1999 before retiring from playing professionally.

Following his retirement, Uderitz returned to Snohomish, Washington, and coached several youth soccer teams in the area for Snohomish United. His son Hal played for the Seattle University Redhawks and was selected in the 2022 MLS SuperDraft by Seattle Sounders FC. His younger son Beckham plays for the Seattle Sounders FC Academy.
