= Hawaii Tsunami =

American soccer club, 1994–1997

The Hawaii Tsunami were a soccer club that competed in the United Soccer Leagues from 1994 to 1997. The club was based in Honolulu, Hawaii.

== Year-by-year ==
Year	Division	League	Reg. season	Playoffs	Open Cup
1994	2	USISL	8th, Pacific	Did not qualify	Did not enter
1995	2	USISL Pro League	1st, Northwest	Sizzling Nine	Quarter final
1996	2	USISL Pro League	4th, Western	Conference Semifinals	semi final
1997	1	USISL D-1 Pro League	4th, West	semi final	semi final

In 1995, the Tsunami went 18–2, leading the USISL in both goals scored and goals against. Hawaii was also a perfect 10–0 at home. The Tsunami also won the Northwest Division championship and a berth in the Sizzling' Nine championships.
