= 1996 New York/New Jersey MetroStars season =

New York/New Jersey MetroStars
1996 season
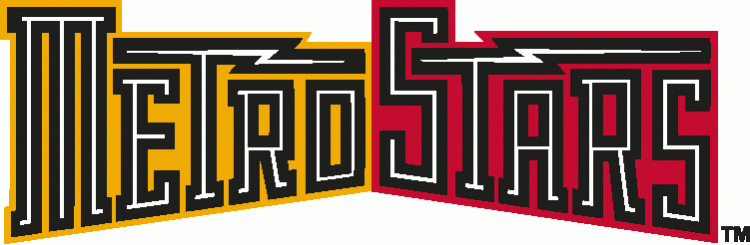
- Chairman: (United States) John Kluge (United States) Stuart Subotnick
- Manager: (Italy) Eddie Firmani (until May 24) (Portugal) Carlos Queiroz (after May 28)
- MLS: Conference: 3rd Overall: 7th
- MLS Cup Playoffs: Conference Semifinals
- Top goalscorer: League: Giovanni Savarese (14); All: Giovanni Savarese (14)
Home colors	Away colors

The 1996 season was the first season in New York/New Jersey MetroStars's existence, in the first season of American Major League Soccer. They played their home games at Giants Stadium in East Rutherford, New Jersey. The team played 38 matches in the season including 35 Major League Soccer games and 3 friendlies. Eddie Firmani coached the team for their first eight games before being replaced by Carlos Queiroz.

The team is now known as the New York Red Bulls; the entire organization is known as Red Bull New York.

== Players ==
These totals come from 32 league matches and 3 playoff played in 1996. Only displaying players who capped 5 games or more.

Player	Position	GP (GS)	Minutes	Goals	Assists
(United States) Rhett Harty	Defender	34 (34)	2845	1	1
(United States) Peter Vermes	Midfielder	33 (33)	2970	1	1
(United States) Tony Meola	Goalkeeper	32 (32)	2880	0	0
(Venezuela) Giovanni Savarese	Striker	29 (16)	1702	14	1
(United States) Tab Ramos	Midfielder	28 (28)	2428	3	10
(Italy) Nicola Caricola	Defender	28 (28)	2357	2	0
(United States) Miles Joseph	Midfielder	27 (26)	2197	4	5
(United States) Jeff Zaun	Defender	24 (22)	1795	0	0
(United States) Matt Knowles	Midfielder	24 (17)	1767	0	0
(United States) A.J. Wood	Striker	23 (15)	1232	5	2
(Argentina) Cristian da Silva	Midfielder	22 (13)	1268	0	0
(United States) Rob Johnson	Striker	21 (12)	1236	4	3
(Italy) Roberto Donadoni	Midfielder	20 (20)	1800	3	10
(United States) Damian Silvera	Midfielder	17 (9)	953	0	1
(United States) Chris Unger	Midfielder	16 (12)	1029	1	1
(United States) Ted Gillen	Defender	16 (10)	852	0	0
(Colombia) Antony de Ávila	Striker	11 (10)	920	8	3
(United States) Mickey Kydes	Midfielder	11 (7)	556	0	0
(Mexico) Edmundo Rodriguez	Striker	11 (5)	473	0	1
(Colombia) Rubén Darío Hernández	Striker	10 (9)	836	0	3
(Republic of Ireland) Kieron O'Brien	Midfielder	8 (4)	311	1	1
(United States) Manny Lagos	Midfielder	6 (6)	483	0	2
(United States) Andrew Restrepo	Defender	5 (4)	343	0	0
(United States) Chris Brauchle	Midfielder	5 (3)	323	0	0

== Results ==
=== Regular season ===
April 13, 1996 1	Los Angeles Galaxy	2–1	MetroStars	Pasadena, California
	Jones 37'; Armas (yellow card) 38'; Noamouz 56'	Report	Kydes (yellow card) 14'; Silvera (yellow card) 75'; Savarese 77'	Stadium: Rose Bowl; Attendance: 69,255; Referee: Brian Hall

April 20, 1996 2	MetroStars	0–1	New England Revolution	East Rutherford, New Jersey
	Harty (yellow card) 48'; Vermes (yellow card) 58'	Report	Burns (yellow card) 79'; Caricola 87' (o.g.)	Stadium: Giants Stadium; Attendance: 46,826; Referee: Raul Dominguez

April 27, 1996 3	MetroStars	0–2	Columbus Crew	East Rutherford, New Jersey
	Knowles (yellow card) 33'; Zaun (yellow card) 44'; Vermes (yellow card) 58'	Report	Bliss 13', (yellow card) 15'; Thompson 87'	Stadium: Giants Stadium; Attendance: 26,416; Referee: Zimmerman Boulos

May 4, 1996 4	MetroStars	3–3 (2–1 SO)	Tampa Bay Mutiny	East Rutherford, New Jersey
	Kydes (yellow card) 46'; Kooiman 72' (o.g.); Savarese 73', 75'	Report	Viera 51', 58'; Valderrama 53' (pen.); Lassiter (yellow card) 83'	Stadium: Giants Stadium; Attendance: 38,621; Referee: Esse Baharmast
	Shootout
	Vermes (penalty missed); Hernández (penalty scored); Savarese (penalty missed); Ramos (penalty scored)		(penalty missed) Vásquez; (penalty missed) Pittman; (penalty missed) Valderrama; (penalty scored) Lassiter; (penalty missed) McKinley

May 12, 1996 5	D.C. United	1–1 (1–2 SO)	MetroStars	Washington, D.C.
	Harkes 11'; Huwiler (yellow card) 24'; Peay (yellow card) 36'	Report	Restrepo (yellow card) 21'; Ramos (yellow card) 36' (yellow-red card) 77'; Knowles (yellow card) 52'; Savarese 64'	Stadium: RFK Stadium; Attendance: 14,722; Referee: Kevin Stott
	Shootout
	Agoos (penalty missed); Medved (penalty missed); Crawley (penalty scored); Díaz Arce (penalty missed); Harkes (penalty missed)		(penalty missed) Savarese; (penalty missed) Vermes; (penalty scored) Caricola; (penalty scored) Hernandez; (penalty missed) Donadoni

May 16, 1996 6	MetroStars	3–0	Colorado Rapids	East Rutherford, New Jersey
	Savarese 11', 30', 75'; Joseph (yellow card) 41'; Harty (yellow card) 62'	Report	Butterworth (yellow card) 16'; Harbor (yellow card) 17'	Stadium: Giants Stadium; Attendance: 14,121; Referee: Raul Dominguez

May 19, 1996 7	New England Revolution	2–0	MetroStars	Foxborough, Massachusetts
	Ukrop (yellow card) 4'; Naveda 9'; Paul Keegan 18', (yellow card) 86'; Wélton (yellow card) 26'; Aunger (yellow card) 36'	Report	Caricola (yellow card) 46'; Harty (yellow card) 88'	Stadium: Foxboro Stadium; Attendance: 20,131; Referee: Arturo Angeles

May 22, 1996 8	Kansas City Wiz	2–1	MetroStars	Kansas City, Missouri
	Prampin 82'; Preki 87'	Report	Caricola (yellow card) 21'; Savarese 26'; da Silva (yellow card) 43'; Ramos (yellow card) 56'; Vermes (yellow card) 70'	Stadium: Arrowhead Stadium; Attendance: 8,916; Referee: Ali Saheli

May 30, 1996 9	MetroStars	1–2	D.C. United	East Rutherford, New Jersey
	Kydes (yellow card) 26'; Wood 27'; Knowles (yellow card) 45'	Report	Rammel 19'; Gori (yellow card) 23'; Sanneh 32'; Williams (yellow card) 38'	Stadium: Giants Stadium; Attendance: 25,322; Referee: Zimmerman Boulos

June 2, 1996 10	Dallas Burn	0–1	MetroStars	Dallas, Texas
	Rodriguez (yellow card) 66' (yellow-red card) 67'	Report	Vermes (yellow card) 60'; Wood 62'	Stadium: Cotton Bowl; Attendance: 10,610; Referee: Kevin Terry

June 9, 1996 11	MetroStars	0–4	Los Angeles Galaxy	East Rutherford, New Jersey
	Caricola (red card) 65'; Knowles (yellow card) 80'	Report	Hurtado 14', 26', 81' (pen.); Razov 86'	Stadium: Giants Stadium; Attendance: 53,250; Referee: Kevin Terry

June 16, 1996 12	MetroStars	0–1	San Jose Clash	East Rutherford, New Jersey
	Baba (yellow card) 4'; Vermes (yellow card) 26'	Report	Baicher 14'; Iroha (yellow card) 58'	Stadium: Giants Stadium; Attendance: 18,404; Referee: Kevin Stott

June 19, 1996 13	MetroStars	0–0 (2–0 SO)	Dallas Burn	East Rutherford, New Jersey
		Report	Álvarez (yellow card) 33'; Lozzano (yellow card) 50'	Stadium: Giants Stadium; Attendance: 14,322; Referee: Esse Baharmast
	Shootout
	Knowles (penalty scored); Lagos (penalty missed); Joseph (penalty scored)		(penalty missed) Haynes; (penalty missed) Lozzano; (penalty missed) Santel; (penalty missed) Soñora

June 26, 1996 14	MetroStars	2–0	Kansas City Wiz	East Rutherford, New Jersey
	Savarese 50'; Ramos 52'	Report	Gutiérrez (yellow card) 30'	Stadium: Giants Stadium; Attendance: 16,103; Referee: Ruben Rodhas

June 30, 1996 15	Columbus Crew	0–4	MetroStars	Columbus, Ohio
	Cozier (yellow card) 70'	Report	Caricola 23'; Ramos (yellow card) 27', (goal) 79'; Vermes (yellow card) 29'; Harty (yellow card) 41'; Savarese 76'; Unger 90'	Stadium: Ohio Stadium; Attendance: 17,261; Referee: Rich Grady

July 4, 1996 16	Colorado Rapids	2–1	MetroStars	Denver, Colorado
	Kinnear (yellow card) 61'; Caricola 68' (o.g.); Trittschuh 83'	Report	Ramos 58'	Stadium: Mile High Stadium; Attendance: 20,117; Referee: Esse Baharmast

July 10, 1996 17	MetroStars	3–2	Dallas Burn	East Rutherford, New Jersey
	Harty (yellow card) 32'; Caricola 35'; Savarese 48', 77'; Johnson (yellow card) 49'; Ramos (yellow card) 53'; Meola (yellow card) 63'	Report	Álvarez (yellow card) 32', (goal) 63' (pen.); Kreis (yellow card) 65'; Sánchez 66', (yellow card) 90'	Stadium: Giants Stadium; Attendance: 17,416; Referee: Ruben Rodhas

July 21, 1996 18	Los Angeles Galaxy	3–0	MetroStars	Pasadena, California
	Vanney 22'; Motajo (yellow card) 24'; Hurtado (yellow card) 33'; Cienfuegos (yellow card) 58', (goal) 71'; Karapetyan 65'	Report	Ramos (yellow card) 7'; Caricola (yellow card) 51'	Stadium: Rose Bowl; Attendance: 17,137; Referee: Tim Weyland

July 24, 1996 19	San Jose Clash	0–1	MetroStars	San Jose, California
	Rodas (yellow card) 29'	Report	Zaun (yellow card) 12'; Johnson 29'	Stadium: Spartan Stadium; Attendance: 15,096; Referee: Kevin Stott

July 28, 1996 20	MetroStars	4–1	San Jose Clash	East Rutherford, New Jersey
	Savarese (yellow card) 31'; Johnson 36'; Caricola (yellow card) 38'; Vermes 51'; Wood 80'; Harty 88'	Report	Emenalo (yellow card) 9'; Wynalda 39' (pen.); Doyle (red card) 42'; Lewis (red card) 81'	Stadium: Giants Stadium; Attendance: 21,212; Referee: Rich Grady

August 3, 1996 21	New England Revolution	1–1 (3–2 SO)	MetroStars	Foxborough, Massachusetts
	Moore 42'; Naveda (yellow card) 64'; Wylie (yellow card) 79'	Report	Ramos (yellow card) 38'; Zaun (yellow card) 39'; Donadoni (yellow card) 52', (goal) 54'; Johnson (yellow card) 60'; Joseph (yellow card) 72'	Stadium: Foxboro Stadium; Attendance: 20,162; Referee: Arturo Angeles
	Shootout
	Moore (penalty scored); Aunger (penalty scored); Naveda (penalty scored); Sawatzky (penalty missed)		(penalty missed) Joseph; (penalty scored) Knowles; (penalty missed) Donadoni; (penalty scored) Wood; (penalty missed) Vermes

August 11, 1996 22	Colorado Rapids	0–2	MetroStars	Denver, Colorado
	Bartlett (yellow card) 88'	Report	Donadoni 14'; Zaun (yellow card) 15'; Joseph 34'	Stadium: Mile High Stadium; Attendance: 8,880; Referee: Esse Baharmast

August 14, 1996 23	MetroStars	4–0	New England Revolution	East Rutherford, New Jersey
	Wood 12'; Johnson 17', 73'; Ramos (yellow card) 55'; de Ávila 81'	Report	Lips (yellow card) 38'; Naveda (yellow card) 55'	Stadium: Giants Stadium; Attendance: 20,711; Referee: Joshua Patlak

August 17, 1996 24	Tampa Bay Mutiny	3–1	MetroStars	Tampa, Florida
	Lassiter 13', 36'; Kooiman 24'	Report	Knowles (yellow card) 23'; Joseph (yellow card) 64'; Donadoni 67' (pen.)	Stadium: Houlihan's Stadium; Referee: Frank Gorog

August 21, 1996 25	MetroStars	2–3	D.C. United	East Rutherford, New Jersey
	de Avila 26', 65'; Ramos (yellow card) 36'; Harty (yellow card) 48'; Zaun (yellow card) 56'	Report	Agoos (yellow card) 27'; Williams 34'; Etcheverry 45', (yellow card) 79'; Díaz Arce (yellow card) 56', (goal) 77'; Pope (yellow card) 59'	Stadium: Giants Stadium; Attendance: 20,416; Referee: Arturo Angeles

September 1, 1996 26	Kansas City Wiz	2–2 (3–1 SO)	MetroStars	Kansas City, Missouri
	Silvera 70' (o.g.); Takawira 76'	Report	Hennessy 15'; Wood 45'; Ramos (yellow card) 83'	Stadium: Arrowhead Stadium; Attendance: 11,139; Referee: Steve Olson
	Shootout
	Chung (penalty missed); Johnston (penalty scored); Preki (penalty scored); Sorber (penalty scored)		(penalty missed) Ramos; (penalty missed) Harty; (penalty scored) Donadoni; (penalty missed) Wood

September 4, 1996 27	MetroStars	0–2	Tampa Bay Mutiny	East Rutherford, New Jersey
		Report	Hejduk 6'; Dougherty (yellow card) 76'; Lassiter 80'	Stadium: Giants Stadium; Attendance: 16,102; Referee: Tim Weyland

September 6, 1996 28	D.C. United	1–2	Metrostars	Washington, D.C.
	Sanneh (yellow card) 17', (goal) 50'; Agoos (yellow card) 31'; Rammel (yellow card) 88'	Report	Vermes (yellow card) 13'; de Ávila 18', (yellow card) 76'; Joseph 30'; Caricola (yellow card) 37'; da Silva (yellow card) 45'	Stadium: RFK Stadium; Attendance: 8,053; Referee: Zimmerman Boulos

September 10, 1996 29	MetroStars	3–1	Los Angeles Galaxy	East Rutherford, New Jersey
	Ramos (yellow card) 9'; Joseph 23', 35'; Harty (yellow card) 33'; de Ávila 56'	Report	Onalfo (yellow card) 15'; Moyajo (yellow card) 38'; Vanney 60'	Stadium: Giants Stadium; Attendance: 19,111; Referee: Esse Baharmast

September 15, 1996 30	Columbus Crew	2–0	MetroStars	Columbus, Ohio
	McBride 3'; Carrera 14'; Yeagley (yellow card) 34'	Report	Caricola (yellow card) 6'; Vermes (yellow card) 21'	Stadium: Ohio Stadium; Attendance: 31,550; Referee: Robert Sheker

September 18, 1996 31	MetroStars	1–0	Columbus Crew	East Rutherford, New Jersey
	de Ávila 9'; Ramos (yellow card) 82'; Silvera (yellow card) 84'	Report	Iribarren (yellow card) 44'; Warzycha (yellow card) 63'	Stadium: Giants Stadium; Attendance: 14,007; Referee: Kevin Terry

September 21, 1996 32	Tampa Bay Mutiny	4–1	MetroStars	Tampa, Florida
	Lassiter 11', 30'; Diffley (yellow card) 56'; Viera 57'; Galderisi 75'	Report	da Silva (yellow card) 49' (yellow-red card) 68'	Stadium: Houlihan's Stadium; Attendance: 11,145; Referee: Frank Gorog

=== Playoffs ===
==== Conference semifinals ====
September 24, 1996 Game 1	MetroStars	2–2 (6–5 SO)	D.C. United	East Rutherford, New Jersey
	de Ávila 38'; Savarese 75'	Report	Díaz Arce 24'; Williams (yellow card) 44'; Moreno 56'	Stadium: Giants Stadium; Attendance: 14,416; Referee: Esse Baharmast
	Shootout
	de Ávila (penalty scored); Donadoni (penalty scored); Ramos (penalty missed); Joseph (penalty scored); Knowles (penalty scored); Silvera (penalty missed); Savarese (penalty scored); Zaun (penalty missed); Meola (penalty missed); Johnson (penalty missed); Vermes (penalty scored)		(penalty scored) Agoos; (penalty scored) Etcheverry; (penalty scored) Moreno; (penalty missed) Díaz Arce; (penalty scored) Sanneh; (penalty missed) Harkes; (penalty scored) Gori; (penalty missed) Williams; (penalty missed) Peay; (penalty missed) Pope; (penalty missed) Causey

September 27, 1996 Game 2	D.C. United	1–0	MetroStars	Washington, D.C.
	Etcheverry (yellow card) 5', (goal) 72'; Moreno (red card) 89'	Report	Zaun (yellow card) 47'; Caricola (yellow card) 62'	Stadium: RFK Stadium; Attendance: 21,442; Referee: Paul Tamberino

October 2, 1996 Game 3	D.C. United	2–1	MetroStars	Washington, D.C.
	Peay (yellow card) 61'; Rammel 67'; Díaz Arce 89' (pen.)	Report	Caricola (yellow card) 38'; Joseph (yellow card) 57'; de Ávila 86'; Meola (yellow card) 89'	Stadium: RFK Stadium; Attendance: 20,423; Referee: Brian Hall

=== Friendlies ===
Win Draw Loss

Date	Home	Away	Score	Metro Goal(s)
May 24	MetroStars	Fiorentina	0–4
June 5	MetroStars	Sporting CP	1–1	Wood
November 15	Pennsylvania Natives	MetroStars	1–2	Savarese 2

== Final standings ==
Place	Eastern Conference	P	W	(so)	L	(so)	F	A	GD	Points
1	Tampa Bay Mutiny	32	20	(1)	12	(3)	66	51	+15	58
2	D.C. United	32	16	(1)	16	(3)	62	56	+6	46
3	NY/NJ MetroStars	32	15	(3)	17	(2)	45	47	-2	39
4	Columbus Crew	32	15	(4)	17	(5)	59	60	-1	37
5	New England Revolution	32	15	(6)	17	(2)	43	56	-13	33
Place	Western Conference	P	W	(so)	L	(so)	F	A	GD	Points
1	Los Angeles Galaxy	32	19	(4)	13	(4)	59	49	+10	49
2	Dallas Burn	32	17	(5)	15	(3)	50	48	+2	41
3	Kansas City Wiz	32	17	(5)	15	(2)	61	63	-2	41
4	San Jose Clash	32	15	(3)	17	(6)	50	50	0	39
5	Colorado Rapids	32	11	(2)	21	(4)	44	59	-15	29

== See also ==
- 1996 Major League Soccer season
