= All-time New York Red Bulls goalscorers =

This list comprises all players who have scored at least one competitive goal (MLS, Playoffs, US Open Cup, CONCACAF Champions League) for the New York Red Bulls (formerly known as the MetroStars) since the team's first Major League Soccer season in 1996. Players who were on the roster but never scored a goal are not listed.

== Goalscorers ==
As of July 5, 2025 (All competitive matches): Statistics from Major League Soccer and Metro Fanatic

Place	Nation	Name	Period	MLS	Playoffs	Open Cup	Continental	Total
1	(England)	Bradley Wright-Phillips	2013–2019	108	9	5	4	126
2	(Colombia)	Juan Pablo Ángel	2007–2010	58	3	1	0	62
3	(France)	Thierry Henry	2010–2014	51	1	0	0	52
4	(Austria)	Daniel Royer	2016–2021	39	4	3	4	50
5	(United States)	Clint Mathis	2000–2003; 2007	39	3	3	0	45
6	(Venezuela)	Giovanni Savarese	1996–1998	41	1	2	0	44
7	(Honduras)	Amado Guevara	2003–2006	32	2	5	0	39
8	(United States)	John Wolyniec	1999; 2003–2010	26	2	7	1	36
9	(Scotland)	**Lewis Morgan**	2022–**Present**	27	1	3	0	31
10	(Colombia)	Adolfo Valencia	2000–2001	21	5	1	2	29
11	(Brazil)	Rodrigo Faria	2001–2002	20	3	2	0	25
12	(Ghana)	Lloyd Sam	2012–2016	20	0	3	1	24
13	(United States)	Mike Magee	2003–2008	23	0	0	0	23
13	(Jamaica)	Dane Richards	2007–2012; 2015	21	1	1	0	23
14	(United States)	Sacha Kljestan	2015–2017	16	1	3	2	22
15	(United States)	Tom Barlow	2019–2023	14	3	2	0	19
15	(United States)	Kenny Cooper	2012	18	0	1	0	19
15	(United States)	Omir Fernandez	2019–2023	15	0	2	2	19
15	(Ecuador)	Eduardo Hurtado	1998–1999	17	1	1	0	19
16	(Sweden)	**Emil Forsberg**	2024–**Present**	16	1	1	0	18
16	(United States)	Mike Grella	2015–2017	16	0	2	0	18
16	(Brazil)	Elias Manoel	2022–2024	13	3	0	2	18
17	(Colombia)	Antony de Ávila	1996–1997	15	2	0	0	17
17	(Estonia)	Joel Lindpere	2010–2012	15	2	0	0	17
18	(United States)	Jozy Altidore	2006–2008	15	1	0	0	16
18	(Australia)	Tim Cahill	2012–2014	14	2	0	0	16
18	(Colombia)	Alex Comas	2000–2001	15	0	1	0	16
18	(United States)	Eddie Gaven	2003–2005	16	0	0	0	16
18	(United States)	Brian White	2018–2021	15	1	0	0	16
19	(Venezuela)	Cristian Cásseres	2018–2023	14	0	1	0	15
19	(United States)	Dax McCarty	2011–2016	14	1	0	0	15
19	(Puerto Rico)	Petter Villegas	1996, 1999; 2000–2002	13	2	0	0	15
20	(Paraguay)	Kaku	2018–2020	13	0	0	1	14
20	(Poland)	Patryk Klimala	2021–2022	13	0	1	0	14
20	(United States)	Aaron Long	2016–2022	12	0	2	0	14
21	(United States)	Mark Chung	1999–2001	9	2	2	0	13
21	(France)	Youri Djorkaeff	2005–2006	12	1	0	0	13
21	(United States)	Alex Muyl	2016–2020	11	1	0	1	13
21	(United States)	Billy Walsh	1998–2001	10	0	3	0	13
22	(United States)	**Cameron Harper**	2021–**Present**	12	0	0	0	12
22	(Argentina)	Gonzalo Verón	2015–2017	10	1	1	0	12
23	(Cameroon)	**Eric Maxim Choupo-Moting**	2025–**Present**	11	0	0	0	11
23	(Senegal)	Mamadou Diallo	2002	11	0	0	0	11
23	(Argentina)	Fabián Espíndola	2013	9	0	2	0	11
23	(United States)	Miles Joseph	1996–2000	9	1	1	0	11
23	(Belgium)	Dante Vanzeir	2023–2024	6	2	1	2	11
24	(Brazil)	Felipe	2015–2018	10	0	0	0	10
24	(Argentina)	Sergio Galván Rey	2004–2005	9	0	1	0	10
24	(United States)	Brian Kelly	1997–2000	10	0	0	0	10
24	(Brazil)	Luquinhas	2022–2023	8	0	2	0	10
24	(United States)	Tab Ramos	1996–2002	8	1	1	0	10
24	(England)	Luke Rodgers	2011	9	1	0	0	10
24	(Netherlands)	Dave van den Bergh	2007–2008	9	1	0	0	10
25	(France)	Peguy Luyindula	2013–2014	6	3	0	0	9
25	(United States)	Jim Rooney	1998–1999	8	0	1	0	9
25	(United States)	John Tolkin	2021–2024	7	1	1	0	9
26	(United States)	Frankie Amaya	2021–2024	8	0	0	0	8
26	(United States)	Caden Clark	2020–2022	7	1	0	0	8
26	(United States)	Steve Jolley	2000–2003; 2006	7	0	1	0	8
26	(Ghana)	**Mohammed Sofo**	2024–**Present**	5	0	3	0	8
27	(United States)	Eric Alexander	2013–2014	6	1	0	0	7
27	(United States)	Sean Davis	2015–2021	4	0	1	2	7
27	(Brazil)	Fábio	2021	7	0	0	0	7
27	(United States)	Mike Petke	1998–2002; 2009–2010	5	0	1	1	7
27	(United States)	Seth Stammler	2004–2010	6	0	1	0	7
27	(Northern Ireland)	Jonny Steele	2013–2014	6	0	1	0	7
27	(United States)	A. J. Wood	1996–1997	7	0	0	0	7
28	(Cameroon)	Anatole Abang	2015–2019	4	1	1	0	6
28	(United States)	Juan Agudelo	2010–2012	6	0	0	0	6
28	(United States)	Edson Buddle	2006	6	0	0	0	6
28	(Italy)	Roberto Donadoni	1996–1997	6	0	0	0	6
28	(United States)	**Kyle Duncan**	2018–**Present**	6	0	0	0	6
28	(Haiti)	Derrick Etienne	2016–2019	6	0	0	0	6
28	(Trinidad and Tobago)	Cornell Glen	2004	6	0	0	0	6
28	(Senegal)	Macoumba Kandji	2008–2010	6	0	0	0	6
28	(Haiti)	Peguero Jean Philippe	2006	6	0	0	0	6
28	(United States)	Ante Razov	2005	6	0	0	0	6
28	(Colombia)	Andrés Reyes	2021–2024	5	1	0	0	6
28	(United States)	Mike Sorber	1997–1999	4	1	1	0	6
29	(Venezuela)	**Wikelman Carmona**	2021–**Present**	5	0	0	0	5
29	(Norway)	**Dennis Gjengaar**	2024–**Present**	4	0	1	0	5
29	(United States)	Connor Lade	2012–2019	2	0	2	1	5
29	(Jamaica)	Kemar Lawrence	2015–2019	5	0	0	0	5
29	(United States)	**Sean Nealis**	2019–**Present**	3	1	1	0	5
29	(Germany)	Marc Rzatkowski	2018–2020	4	0	0	1	5
29	(Jamaica)	Fabian Taylor	2004	5	0	0	0	5
29	(France)	Florian Valot	2018–2021	5	0	0	0	5
30	(Morocco)	Mehdi Ballouchy	2010–2012	4	0	0	0	4
30	(South Africa)	Shaun Bartlett	1997	2	0	2	0	4
30	(South Africa)	Danleigh Borman	2008–2010	4	0	0	0	4
30	(United States)	Ricardo Clark	2003–2004	4	0	0	0	4
30	(United States)	Brad Davis	2002	4	0	0	0	4
30	(United States)	Rob Johnson	1996–1999	4	0	0	0	4
30	(Panama)	Michael Amir Murillo	2017–2019	4	0	0	0	4
30	(United States)	**Serge Ngoma**	2022–**Present**	4	0	0	0	4
30	(Colombia)	Jámison Olave	2013–2014	4	0	0	0	4
30	(Venezuela)	Jorge Rojas	2008–2009	2	0	2	0	4
30	(United States)	Mark Semioli	1997–2001	4	0	0	0	4
30	(Guadeloupe)	Ronald Zubar	2015–2016	3	0	1	0	4
31	(United States)	Tyler Adams	2016–2018	2	0	0	1	3
31	(Jamaica)	Cory Burke	2023–2024	3	0	0	0	3
31	(United States)	Conor Chinn	2010	0	0	3	0	3
31	(England)	Paul Dougherty	1998	3	0	0	0	3
31	(United States)	Chris Henderson	2006	3	0	0	0	3
31	(Sweden)	Markus Holgersson	2012–2013	3	0	0	0	3
31	(Ghana)	Salou Ibrahim	2010	3	0	0	0	3
31	(United States)	Mark Lisi	2002–2006	3	0	0	0	3
31	(United States)	Tim Parker	2018–2020	1	2	0	0	3
31	(United States)	Heath Pearce	2012–2013	2	0	1	0	3
31	(Norway)	Jan Solli	2011–2012	3	0	0	0	3
31	(Argentina)	Diego Soñora	1998	3	0	0	0	3
31	(Bosnia and Herzegovina)	Siniša Ubiparipović	2007–2010	2	0	1	0	3
31	(England)	Dru Yearwood	2020–2023	3	0	0	0	3
31	(Colombia)	Henry Zambrano	1999	3	0	0	0	3
32	(Ghana)	Gideon Baah	2016–2017	2	0	0	0	2
32	(United States)	Brandon Barklage	2012–2013	2	0	0	0	2
32	(Brazil)	Branco	1997	1	0	1	0	2
32	(Uruguay)	**Felipe Carballo**	2024–**Present**	0	0	0	0	2
32	(Italy)	Nicola Caricola	1996	2	0	0	0	2
32	(United States)	Jordan Cila	2006	1	0	1	0	2
32	(Serbia)	Saša Ćurčić	1999	2	0	0	0	2
32	(Canada)	Dwayne De Rosario	2011	2	0	0	0	2
32	(Liberia)	Francis Doe	2007	2	0	0	0	2
32	(United States)	Mike Duhaney	1998–1999	2	0	0	0	2
32	(United States)	Todd Dunivant	2006–2007	2	0	0	0	2
32	(United States)	**Daniel Edelman**	2022–**Present**	2	0	0	0	2
32	(United States)	Kevin Goldthwaite	2007–2009	2	0	0	0	2
32	(United States)	Andrew Gutman	2021	2	0	0	0	2
32	(United States)	**Julian Hall**	2024–**Present**	2	0	0	0	2
32	(United States)	Rhett Harty	1996–1998	1	0	1	0	2
32	(United States)	Daniel Hernandez	2001–2002	1	0	1	0	2
32	(Togo)	Abbe Ibrahim	2005	2	0	0	0	2
32	(Romania)	Andreas Ivan	2018–2019	1	0	0	1	2
32	(Ukraine)	Dema Kovalenko	2006–2007	2	0	0	0	2
32	(United States)	Alexi Lalas	1998	2	0	0	0	2
32	(United States)	Jacob LeBlanc	2003	2	0	0	0	2
32	(Cameroon)	Matthew Mbuta	2008–2009	2	0	0	0	2
32	(United States)	Ben Mines	2018–2020	2	0	0	0	2
32	(Bolivia)	Jaime Moreno	2003	2	0	0	0	2
32	(United States)	Ross Paule	2001–2002	2	0	0	0	2
32	(France)	Damien Perrinelle	2014–2017	2	0	0	0	2
32	(United States)	Eddie Pope	2003–2004	0	0	2	0	2
32	(Colombia)	Carlos Rivas	2018	2	0	0	0	2
32	(Uganda)	Ibrahim Sekagya	2013–2014	2	0	0	0	2
32	(United States)	Anthony Wallace	2015	2	0	0	0	2
32	(Jamaica)	Andy Williams	2002	2	0	0	0	2
33	(Colombia)	Pedro Álvarez	2001	1	0	0	0	1
33	(United States)	Kenny Arena	2003–2004	1	0	0	0	1
33	(France)	Vincent Bezecourt	2017–2019	0	0	1	0	1
33	(Poland)	**Wiktor Bogacz**	2025–**Present**	1	0	0	0	1
33	(Spain)	Ruben Bover	2013–2014	1	0	0	0	1
33	(United States)	Michael Bradley	2005	1	0	0	0	1
33	(Liberia)	Michael Butler	2001	1	0	0	0	1
33	(United States)	Sal Caccavale	2007	1	0	0	0	1
33	(Spain)	Albert Celades	2009	1	0	0	0	1
33	(United States)	Danny Cepero	2008–2009	1	0	0	0	1
33	(Colombia)	Wilman Conde	2012	1	0	0	0	1
33	(United States)	Austin da Luz	2010–2011	1	0	0	0	1
33	(Israel)	Omer Damari	2016	0	0	0	1	1
33	(United States)	Chris Duvall	2014–2016	1	0	0	0	1
33	(England)	Mandela Egbo	2020–2021	1	0	0	0	1
33	(Sweden)	**Noah Eile**	2024–**Present**	1	0	0	0	1
33	(United States)	Hunter Freeman	2007–2008	1	0	0	0	1
33	(Argentina)	José Galván	2003	0	0	1	0	1
33	(Republic of Ireland)	Ian Hennessy	1996	1	0	0	0	1
33	(United States)	Corey Hertzog	2011	0	0	1	0	1
33	(Poland)	Andrzej Juskowiak	2003	1	0	0	0	1
33	(Belgium)	Nansha Kalonji	1999	1	0	0	0	1
33	(United States)	Brian Kamler	2002	1	0	0	0	1
33	(Haiti)	Jerrod Laventure	2006–2007	1	0	0	0	1
33	(France)	Sébastien Le Toux	2012	1	0	0	0	1
33	(United States)	Lawrence Lozzano	1999	1	0	0	0	1
33	(Mexico)	Rafael Márquez	2010–2012	1	0	0	0	1
33	(United States)	Matt Miazga	2013–2015	1	0	0	0	1
33	(Costa Rica)	Roy Myers	1999–2001	1	0	0	0	1
33	(United States)	**Dylan Nealis**	2022–**Present**	0	0	1	0	1
33	(United States)	Mike Nugent	2003	0	0	1	0	1
33	(Austria)	Ernst Öbster	2009	0	0	0	1	1
33	(Colombia)	Arley Palacios	1998–1999	1	0	0	0	1
33	(United States)	Jeff Parke	2004–2008	1	0	0	0	1
33	(United States)	Tim Ream	2010–2011	1	0	0	0	1
33	(Wales)	Carl Robinson	2010–2011	1	0	0	0	1
33	(England)	John Rooney	2011	0	0	1	0	1
33	(United States)	Zach Ryan	2022	0	0	1	0	1
33	(France)	Saër Sène	2014	0	0	0	1	1
33	(Colombia)	Diego Serna	2002	1	0	0	0	1
33	(United States)	Steve Shak	2000–2001	1	0	0	0	1
33	(England)	Josh Sims	2019–2020	0	1	0	0	1
33	(Egypt)	Amro Tarek	2019–2021	1	0	0	0	1
33	(Cameroon)	Tony Tchani	2010–2011	1	0	0	0	1
33	(United States)	Chris Unger	1996	1	0	0	0	1
33	(Bolivia)	Joselito Vaca	2004	1	0	0	0	1
33	(Chile)	Marcelo Vega	1998	1	0	0	0	1
33	(United States)	Peter Vermes	1996	1	0	0	0	1
33	(England)	Shaun Wright-Phillips	2015–2016	1	0	0	0	1
33	(Jamaica)	Craig Ziadie	2002–2004	1	0	0	0	1
33	(United States)	Sal Zizzo	2015–2017	0	0	1	0	1

Bold signifies current Red Bulls player

== Goals by Nation ==
As of July 5, 2025 (All competitive matches)

Nation	Goals
United States	563
England	146
Colombia	143
France	84
Brazil	72
Venezuela	67
Austria	51
Honduras	39
Jamaica	39
Argentina	37
Ghana	37
Scotland	31
Sweden	22
Cameroon	20
Ecuador	19
Estonia	17
Senegal	17
Australia	16
Poland	16
Puerto Rico	15
Poland	15
Paraguay	14
Haiti	13
Belgium	12
Netherlands	10
Italy	8
Norway	8
South Africa	8
Northern Ireland	7
Trinidad and Tobago	6
Germany	5
Guadeloupe	4
Morocco	4
Panama	4
Bolivia	3
Liberia	3
Canada	2
Romania	2
Serbia	2
Spain	2
Togo	2
Uganda	2
Ukraine	2
Bosnia and Herzegovina	1
Chile	1
Costa Rica	1
Egypt	1
(Republic of Ireland) Ireland	1
Israel	1
Mexico	1
Wales	1
