= 1996 USISL Pro League =

USISL Pro League
- Season: 1996
- Champions: Charleston Battery (1st Title)
- Regular Season title: Charlotte Eagles (1st Title)
- Matches: 216
- Goals: 820 (3.8 per match)
- Best Player: (United States) Craig Beeson Everett BigFoot
- Top goalscorer: (Nigeria) Patrick Olalere Charleston Battery (20 Goals)
- Best goalkeeper: (United States) Chris Carmiento Hawaii Tsumani

The 1996 USISL Professional League was the second highest of the three outdoor men's leagues run by the United Systems of Independent Soccer Leagues during the summer of 1996.

== Overview ==
This season, USISL created a higer caliber professional league called the Select League. Several 1995 Pro League teams moved up and did not compete in the 1996 Pro League.

The USISL aligned its rules with other soccer leagues including the newly created Major Soccer League. Previously USISL had used 60 minute halves and a penalty shot for every foul committed after the seventh foul of each half but these rules were eliminated for the 1996 season. The USISL also changed its regular season points system to award three points for a win and one point for a shootout win. The average pay for Pro League players was $200 per week. The regular season began in mid-April 1996.

Prime Network provided live broadcast of the USISL All Star Game and delayed broadcast of the Pro League championship game.

== All Star Game ==
The USISL held its All Star Game on July 17 in Blaine, Minnesota. The game pitted the USISL Select League All Stars against a team composed of USISL Professional League and USISL Premier League players. The league coaches voted to select the players. Players from the USISL Professional League included Goalkeeper Randy DeDini of the Chico Rooks, Defenders Paul Edwards (North Jersey Imperials) and Guy Norcott (Charleston Battery); Midfielders Craig Beeson (Everett BigFoot) and Pat O'Kelly (Central Jersey); Forwards Victor Medina (D/FW Toros) and Jon Payne (Charlotte Eagles).

== Regular season ==
- Regulation win = 3 points
- Shootout win (SW) = 1 points
- Loss = 0 points

=== Northeast Conference ===
Pos	Team	Pld	W	SW	L	GF	GA	GD	Pts
1	Central Jersey Riptide	16	11	2	3	44	24	+20	35
2	North Jersey Imperials	16	11	0	5	42	26	+16	33
3	Rhode Island Stingrays	16	10	0	6	26	20	+6	30
4	Reading Rage	16	9	1	6	39	31	+8	28
5	Philadelphia Freedom	16	8	2	6	40	25	+15	26
6	New Hampshire Phantoms	16	8	1	7	32	40	−8	25
7	Baltimore Bays	16	5	0	11	34	15	+19	15
8	Albany Alleycats	16	4	0	12	34	44	−10	12
9	Worcester Wildfire	16	0	1	15	19	57	−38	1

=== South Atlantic Conference ===
Pos	Team	Pld	W	SW	L	GF	GA	GD	Pts
1	Charlotte Eagles	16	12	0	4	49	25	+24	36
2	Charleston Battery	16	11	1	4	46	23	+23	34
3	Wilmington Hammerheads	16	6	1	9	20	30	−10	19
4	Washington Mustangs	16	6	0	10	25	37	−12	18
5	Mobile Revelers	16	3	2	11	15	33	−18	11
6	Chattanooga Express	16	1	0	15	18	55	−37	3

=== Central Conference ===
Pos	Team	Pld	W	SW	L	GF	GA	GD	Pts
1	Dallas/Fort Worth Toros	16	9	0	7	33	31	+2	27
2	Rockford Raptors	16	8	1	7	34	28	+6	25
3	Tulsa Roughnecks	16	8	0	8	38	34	+4	24
4	San Antonio Pumas	16	6	0	10	25	37	−12	18
5	Houston Hurricanes	16	5	0	11	28	43	−15	15

=== Western Conference ===
Pos	Team	Pld	W	SW	L	GF	GA	GD	Pts
1	Hawaii Tsumani	16	10	0	6	31	19	+12	30
2	Chico Rooks	16	9	1	6	23	16	+7	28
3	Everett Bigfoot	16	7	3	6	27	20	+7	24
4	San Fernando Valley Golden Eagles	16	7	3	6	20	22	−2	24
5	Yakima Reds	16	8	0	8	29	20	+9	24
6	Cascade Surge	16	7	0	9	33	23	+10	21
7	Central Valley Hydra	16	3	0	13	16	48	−32	9

== Playoffs ==
The Mobile Revelers made the playoffs despite having only eleven points. This happened because the South Atlantic Conference had four guaranteed play-off spots. The Charleston Battery received a bye into the playoffs as host of the championship final. Therefore, the league went to the Revelers as the next South Atlantic Conference team in line.

=== Conference semifinals ===
- North Jersey Imperials 3-1 Rhode Island Stingrays
- Charlotte Eagles 1-0 Mobile Revelers (forfeit)
- Wilmington Hammerheads 3-1 Washington Mustangs
- D/FW Toros 1-0 (SO) Houston Hurricanes
- Tulsa Roughnecks 3-2 (SO) Rockford Raptors
- Chico Rooks 3-0 Valley Golden Eagles
- Everete BigFoot 2-1 Hawaii Tsunami
August 10, 1996
5:00 PM

North Jersey Imperials (NJ)	3–1	Rhode Island Stingrays (RI)
Dave Fitzgerald 10', 63', 77'		Carlos Rocha

FDU Field, Teaneck, New Jersey
August 10, 1996

Charlotte Eagles (NC)	1–0 Forfeit	Mobile Revelers (AL)

August 10, 1996
8:00 PM

Wilmington Hammerheads (NC)	3–1	Washington Mustangs (DC)
Chris Gonzalez 48'; Dewan Bader (pen.); Dan Farnham (yellow card) 18:33' (yellow-red card); Scott Schaeper	Report	3' James Wright

Laney Stadium, Wilmington, North Carolina
August 10, 1996

D/FW Toros (TX)	1–0	Houston Hurricanes (TX)

August 10, 1996

Rockford Raptors (IL)	2–3	Tulsa Roughnecks (OK)
		10', 18' Kimberly Thomas

August 10, 1996

Chico Rooks (CA)	3–0	Valley Golden Eagles (CA)
Juan Calvet; Mauricio De Melo	Report	(red card) Jesus Gonzalez; (red card) Jake Gwin

Chico State Stadium, Chico, California
August 10, 1996

Hawaii Tsunami (HA)	1–2	Everett BigFoot (WA)
Chris Gilmore 77'	Report	47', 57' Craig Beeson

Cooke Field, Honolulu, Hawaii
Attendance: 1,750
August 10, 1996
7:30PM

Central Jersey Riptide (NJ)	2-1	Reading Rage (PA)
Pat O'Kelly (3:16); Pete Schneiders 74' (yellow card) (red card)		25' Matt Woolley; (yellow card) 43' (red card) Eric Puls; (yellow card) (red card) Archie Moylan

Raritan High School, Hazlet, New Jersey

=== Conference finals ===
==== Northeast Conference ====
August 16, 1996

North Jersey Imperials (NJ)	5-0	Central Jersey Riptide (NJ)
Pedro Lopes 34'; Dave Fitzgerald; Dave Price

FDU Field, Teaneck, New Jersey
Attendance: 300

August 17, 1996
7:30 PM EST

Central Jersey Riptide (NJ)	2-2 OT	North Jersey Imperials (NJ)
Ozrek; Crowley	Report	DeLuca (PK) Lucey
Penalties
	2-3

Raritan High School, Hazlet, New Jersey
Attendance: 2,004 or 1,500
- North Jersey Imperials advanced to Sizzlin' Six finals.

==== South Atlantic Conference ====
August 15, 1996

Charlotte Eagles (NC)	0-3	Wilmington Hammerheads (NC)
	Report	(29:27) Dewan Bader; (36:35) Bucky Corbin

Charlotte Christian School, Charlotte, North Carolina
Attendance: 1,045
- Wilmington Hammerheads advanced to the Sizzlin' Six finals.

==== Central Conference ====
August 16, 1996

Tulsa Roughnecks (OK)	1-3	DFW Toros (TX)
Virgil Stevens (56:13)	Report	8' Berti Generes (9:30) Victor Medina; Jimmy Glenn 64'

Tulsa, Oklahoma
Attendance: 704
- Originally planned for August 17, the second game was postponed until Sunday morning, August 18, because of heavy rainfall and flooding which rendered the playing field unusable on Saturday.
August 18, 1996
7:00 AM CST

DFW Toros (TX)	1-0	Tulsa Roughnecks (OK)
20'

Dallas, Texas
- D/FW Toros advanced to the Sizzlin' Six finals.

==== Western Conference ====
August 17, 1996

Chico Rooks (CA)	0-0	Everett BigFoot (WA)
Penalties
Manny Ugbah (penalty scored); Dean Freeman (penalty scored)	2-1	Penalty missed

Chico State Stadium, Chico, California
Attendance: 1,056
- Chico Rooks advanced to Sizzlin' Six finals.

== Sizzlin' Six Tournament ==
The Sizzlin’ Six Tournament was a six-team, two group, round robin tournament. Each of the four conference champions entered the tournament, along with national finals host Charleston Battery and the Charlotte Eagles who had the best regular-season record among the conference runners-up.

Each team received 3 points for a win, 1 for a tie and 1 bonus point for each game in which they scored three or more goals. The top two teams in each group with the most points advanced to the semifinals in Charleston, South Carolina.

=== Group A ===
Pos	Team	Pld	W	L	GF	GA	GD	Pts
1	Charleston Battery	2	2	0	4	2	+2	6
2	Chico Rooks	2	1	1	3	3	0	3
3	DFW Toros	2	0	2	2	4	−2	0

August 19, 1996
8:00 PM EST

Charleston Battery (SC)	2-1	Dallas/Fort Worth Toros (TX)
Chris Dias 66'; Jim Foley (72:07)	Report	(11:07) Rene Ortiz

Stoney Field, Charleston, South Carolina
Attendance: 1,526
August 20, 1996
8:00 PM EST

Chico Rooks (CA)	2-1 OT	DFW Toros (TX)
Dean Freeman 27'; Mauricio De Melo 120'		8' Edgar Hernandez; (red card) Baltazar Ascensio; (red card) Jose Bazan

Stoney Field, Charleston, South Carolina
Attendance: 320
August 21, 1996
8:00 PM EST

Charleston Battery (SC)	2-1	Chico Rooks (CA)
Patrick Olalere 12'; Files 82'		45' Juan Lojas

Stoney Field, Charleston, South Carolina
Attendance: 1,539

=== Group B ===
Pos	Team	Pld	W	L	GF	GA	GD	Pts
1	Charlotte Eagles	2	2	0	7	2	+5	7 (Note: Charlotte and Wilmington scored three or more goals in one game each, giving them each one bonus point.)
2	Wilmington Hammerheads	2	1	1	3	1	+2	4
3	North Jersey Imperials	2	0	2	2	9	−7	0

Notes:
August 19, 1996
8:00 PM EST

Wilmington Hammerheads (NC)	3-0	North Jersey Imperials (NJ)
Chris Gonzalez 31'; Dewan Bader (pen.); Shawn Kowaleski

Laney Field, Wilmington, North Carolina
August 20, 1996
8:00 PM EST

Charlotte Eagles (NC)	6-2	North Jersey Imperials (NJ)
Keith Dakin 11' 24' 46'; Jeremy Sorzano 36'; Philibert Jones 50'; Donovan Francis 59'		12' David Price; 30' Gerry Lucey

Laney Field, Wilmington, North Carolina
Attendance: 236
August 21, 1996
8:00 PM EST

Wilmington Hammerheads (NC)	0-1	Charlotte Eagles (NC)
		33' Keith Dakin

Laney Field, Wilmington, North Carolina
Attendance: 1,250

=== Semifinals ===
August 23, 1996
6:00 PM EST

Charlotte Eagles (NC)	1-0	Chico Rooks (CA)

Stoney Field, Charleston, South Carolina
August 23, 1996
8:00 PM EST

Charleston Battery (SC)	2-0	Wilmington Hammerheads (NC)
Patrick Olalere 30'; Chris Dias 87'

Stoney Field, Charleston, South Carolina
Attendance: 2,642

== Final ==
August 24, 1996
8:00 PM EST

Charleston Battery (SC)	2–2	Charlotte Eagles (NC)
Chris Dias 29'; Alvaro Betancur 52'	Report	44' Josh Farrar; 74' Jeremy Sorzano
Penalties
Stephen Winters (penalty scored); Patrick Olalere (penalty scored)	2-1

Stoney Field, Charleston, South Carolina
Attendance: 3,429

== Points leaders ==
Rank	Scorer	Club	Goals	Assists	Points
1	(Trinidad and Tobago) Philibert Jones	Charlotte Eagles	18	20	45
2	(Nigeria) Patrick Olalere	Charleston Battery	20	5	45
3	(United States) Craig Beeson	Everette BigFoot	17	2	36
4	(Republic of Ireland) Jon Payne	Charlotte Eagles	14	8	36
5	(Portugal) Carlos Rocha	Rhode Island Stingrays	14	3	33
6	(United States) Robert DeLuca	North Jersey Imperials	14	3	31
7	(Republic of Ireland) Pat O'Kelly	North Jersey Imperials	12	6	30

== Honors ==
- MVP: (United States) Craig Beeson
- Points leader: (Nigeria) Patrick Olalere
- Defender of the Year: (United States) Guy Norcott
- Goalkeeper of the Year: Chris Carmiento
- Rookie of the Year: (United States) Juan Sastoque
- Coach of the Year: (Portugal) Nuno Piteira
- Organization of the Year: Reading Rage

All-League:

- Goalkeeper: (United States) Randy Dedini
- Defenders: (United States) Guy Norcott, (United States) Tom Finley, (United States) Desmond Armstrong
- Midfielders: (England) David Price, (Republic of Ireland) Pat O'Kelly, (Portugal) Carlos Rocha
- Forward: (United States) Craig Beeson, (Nigeria) Patrick Olalere, (England) Jimmy Wright, (Trinidad and Tobago) Philibert Jones
