= Mirsad Huseinovic =

Montenegrin-American soccer player (born 1968)

Personal information
- Date of birth: November 26, 1968 (age 57)
- Place of birth: Plav, SR Montenegro, SFR Yugoslavia
- Height: 5 ft 11 in (1.80 m)
- Position: Midfielder

College career
Years	Team	Apps	(Gls)
1988–1992	Brooklyn Bulldogs		

Senior career*
Years	Team	Apps	(Gls)
- SC Gjoa
- New York Albanians
1991–1992	Brooklyn Italians		
1993	San Diego Sockers (indoor)		
1995	New York Centaurs	18	(1)
1996	NY/NJ MetroStars	1	(0)
1996–2006	Greek American AA		

International career
1992	United States	1	(0)
- * Club domestic league appearances and goals

Mirsad Huseinovic (born November 26, 1968) is a former professional soccer player who played as a midfielder. Born in Yugoslavia, he represented the United States at international level.

Huseinovic spent one season in the American Professional Soccer League and also played with the NY/NJ Metrostars in Major League Soccer.

He earned one cap with the U.S. national team.

== Early life and career ==
Huseinovic moved to the United States from Yugoslavia with his family when he was five. His family settled in Brooklyn where he learned to play soccer from his father. He attended New Utrecht High School, graduating in 1987.

He then attended Brooklyn College from 1988 to 1992 where he played on the men's soccer team. While playing with Brooklyn, he also played with several teams in the Cosmopolitan Soccer League, including SC Gjoa and the New York Albanians.

== Club career ==
Huseinovic played at least two years with the Brooklyn Italians, winning the 1991 U.S. Open Cup with them.

In April 1993, the San Diego Sockers selected him in the fourth round of the Continental Indoor Soccer League draft.

On April 12, 1995, Huseinovic signed with the New York Centaurs of the American Professional Soccer League (APSL). While with the Centaurs, he played with his cousin Sadri Gjonbalaj.

On July 4, 1996, the NY/NJ MetroStars of Major League Soccer acquired Huseinovic. He played one game, a total of 45 minutes, with the MetroStars before being released.

Since then, he has continued to play with the Greek American AA of the Cosmopolitan Soccer League.

== International career ==
Huseinovic earned one cap with the United States national team in a scoreless tie with Costa Rica on February 12, 1992. Head coach Bora Milutinović put him on as second-half substitute for Jorge Acosta.
