= Jorge Acosta =

Colombian-born American soccer forward (born 1964)

Personal information
- Date of birth: May 29, 1964 (age 62)
- Place of birth: Barranquilla, Atlantico, Colombia
- Height: 5 ft 7 in (1.70 m)
- Position: Forward

Youth career
- 1983–1986: Long Island University

Senior career*
Years	Team	Apps	(Gls)
1988–1990	New Jersey Eagles		
1988–1989	Dallas Sidekicks	37	(5)
1991	Albany Capitals	10	(1)
1991	Penn-Jersey Spirit	8	(0)
1991–1995	Deportivo Cali		
1995	New York Fever	15	(3)
1996	MetroStars	0	(0)
1996	New York Fever	9	(5)

International career
1991–1992	United States	12	(0)
- * Club domestic league appearances and goals

Jorge Acosta (born May 29, 1964) is a Colombian-born American retired soccer forward. He spent most of his career in the lower U.S. divisions, as well as four in the Colombian first division. He also earned twelve caps with the U.S. national team in 1991 and 1992.

== Early life ==
Acosta was born in Colombia, but attended Kennedy High School in Paterson, New Jersey where he played on the boys' soccer team. In two seasons, he scored sixty-three goals, including 34 as a senior. After graduating from high school in 1982, Acosta attended Long Island University.

== Career ==
=== Professional ===
In 1988, he signed with the New Jersey Eagles of the American Soccer League (ASL). The Eagles played their home games in historic Hinchliffe Stadium. That season he led the ASL in scoring with fourteen goals, garnering All Star honors. Acosta spent two more seasons with the Eagles, his scoring declining each year. The Eagles folded at the end of the 1990 season and Acosta moved to the Albany Capitals. However, he managed only a single goal in ten games with the Capitals. The team folded at the end of the season and Acosta moved to Colombia to pursue a career there. While with the Eagles, the St. Louis Steamers of the Major Indoor Soccer League (MISL) drafted Acosta in the second round of the 1988 Player Draft. However, the Steamers folded before the season began and the league held a dispersal draft. The Dallas Sidekicks then selected Acosta. Acosta spent one season with the Sidekicks, scoring only five goals in thirty-seven games. The Sidekicks released Acosta at the end of the season and he returned to the Eagles for the 1989 ASL season. In 1991, he played for the Albany Capitals. In 1991, Acosta moved to Colombia where he joined Deportivo Cali. He played for Deportivo until 1995, when he returned to the United States and signed with the New York Fever of USISL. He played fifteen games and scored three goals that year. The MetroStars of Major League Soccer (MLS) selected Acosta in the 15th round (149th overall) of the 1996 MLS Inaugural Player Draft. However, the MetroStars waived Acosta on April 15, 1996, and he rejoined the Fever. He scored his first of five goals in the 1996 season nine days after he was released from the MetroStars.

=== International ===
Acosta earned twelve caps with the U.S. national team. His first cap came in a September 14, 1991 win over Jamaica. He became a regular with the team through the rest of 1991 and into 1992. However, he was unable to score and by the end of 1992, he was dropped from the national team.

=== Coaching ===
Since retiring from playing professionally, Acosta has held various youth athletic and soccer positions including Assistant Camp Director of the Mickey Kydes Soccer Enterprises and the program director for Rec clinics at Old Greenwich Riverside Civic Center in Connecticut.
