= North Jersey Imperials =

Defunct American soccer club in Paramus, New Jersey

The North Jersey Imperials were a soccer club based in Paramus, New Jersey. They played in the United Soccer Leagues between 1994 and 2001. The Imperials were the first pro team of US national team goalkeeper Tim Howard. Sean Kenny was the head coach.

During their inaugural season in 1994, the Imperials played their home games at Bruins Stadium, which is located within James J. Braddock-Hudson County Park, in North Bergen, New Jersey. That year, the Imperials defeated the Jersey Dragons in the USISL D3 Pro League Northeast Division semi-finals, but fell to the Long Island Rough Riders. Players of note during the inaugural season were John Diffley, who went on to play for the Tampa Bay Mutiny and Kansas City Wizards, Jeff Zaun, who went on to play for the MetroStars, and Tom Lips, who went on to play for the New England Revolution. Another original Imperials player, Pat O'Kelly, was drafted by the MetroStars in 1996, but chose not to sign with the team.

The 1995 season saw the Imperials play their home games at Veteran's Memorial Stadium, in Bayonne, New Jersey. This season saw the Imperials play their two best attended games, when over 2,500 fans turned out to see them play against the Long Island Rough Riders, who featured US national team goalkeeper Tony Meola in their starting lineup, and over 4,500 turned out to see them play an exhibition against Polish club Stal Mielec. That year, the Imperials fell to the New York Fever in the Northeast Division Final.

The 1996 season saw the Imperials play their home games at Fairleigh Dickinson University's University Stadium, located in Teaneck, New Jersey. The Imperials won the USISL D3 Northeast Division Championship that year, defeating the Central Jersey Riptide in the final and advancing to the Sizzling Six National Finals. Notable games that year were exhibitions against Danish club Viborg FF and a game featuring a team of several former New York Cosmos players. Imperials players of note that year were Rob Johnson and Petter Villegas, both of which would go on to play for the MetroStars, and Altimont Butler, who would play for the San Jose Clash.

The 1997 season saw the Imperials continue their tenure at FDU's University Stadium. The Imperials fell in the D3 semi finals (by shoot out) to the Central Jersey Riptide. This season was notable as 18-year-old Tim Howard, from North Brunswick, was the starting goalkeeper for the Imperials. Howard went on to the join the MetroStars for the 1998 season. He was then transferred to Manchester United in 2003 and has been the starting goalkeeper at Everton from 2006 (loan in 2006, transferred in 2007). Howard has been the first-choice goalkeeper for the US national team since 2007 and was the starting goalkeeper at the 2010 FIFA World Cup in South Africa. Other notable Imperials players that year were MetroStars back-up goalkeeper Zach Thornton (4 games) and MetroStars midfielder Cristian da Silva (2 games). During this season, 4 Imperials players, including Tim Howard, Jerry Lucey and Kenny Santos, were called up by the MetroStars for a July 30 exhibition against the Long Island Rough Riders.

The 1998 season saw the Imperials on hiatus.

The 1999 season saw the Imperials play their home games at Sprague Field, on the Campus of Montclair State University, in Montclair, New Jersey. This was a poor campaign, and the Imperials finished in 8th place in the Northeast Division. This season also saw the return of former Imperials goalkeeper Tim Howard, for at least 1 home game, on loan from the MetroStars. A player of note during this season was goalkeeper Kevin East, who'd spent time with the Columbus Crew and the MetroStars. East was loaned to the MetroStars that year, as a backup, when Tim Howard was away with the U.S. U-20 national team.

The 2000 and 2001 seasons saw the Imperials, still playing at Montclair State University, drop a level to the Premier Development League (the 4th division of US Soccer). One notable player from this period is Alecko Eskandarian, who played for the PDL Imperials during the 2000 season. Eskandarian, a Montvale native, would go on to play in Major League Soccer for several MLS teams, and was named MLS Cup MVP for his 2-goal performance at the 2004 event. The North Jersey Imperials became defunct after the 2001 season.

== Year-by-year ==
Year	Division	League	Reg. season	Playoffs	Open Cup
1994	3	USISL	4th, Northeast	Divisional Finals	Did not enter
1995	3	USISL Pro League	2nd, Capital	1st Round	Did not qualify
1996	3	USISL Pro League	2nd, Northeast	Sizzling Six	Did not qualify
1997	3	USISL D-3 Pro League	1st, Northeast	Division Semifinals	Did not qualify
1998	On Hiatus				
1999	3	USL D-3 Pro League	8th, Northern	Did not qualify	Did not qualify
2000	"4"	USL PDL	5th, Northeast	Did not qualify	Did not qualify
2001	"4"	USL PDL	5th, Northeast	Did not qualify	Did not qualify
