= Tom Lips =

American soccer player and coach

Personal information
- Date of birth: June 25, 1968 (age 58)
- Height: 5 ft 11 in (1.80 m)
- Position: Defender

Youth career
- 1986–1987: FC Olten
- 1987–1991: Fairleigh Dickinson University

Senior career*
Years	Team	Apps	(Gls)
1991–1994	St. Gallen		
1994	North Jersey Imperials		
1995	New York Fever		
1996	New England Revolution	8	(0)
1997–1998	Long Island Rough Riders	41	(0)
1999	Boston Bulldogs	14	(1)

International career
- Puerto Rico

Managerial career
- 2006–2007: Long Island Lady Riders
- * Club domestic league appearances and goals

Tom Lips (born June 25, 1968) is an American retired soccer defender who played professionally in the USISL, Major League Soccer and Swiss First Division. He currently coaches the Long Island Lady Riders in the USL W-League.

Lips grew up on Long Island in Hauppuage NY where he played youth, club and travel soccer. He attended Hauppauge High School. Lips began his career in 1986 with FC Olten in the Swiss Second Division. He then returned to the United States where he attended Fairleigh Dickinson University, playing on the men's soccer team from 1987 to 1991. After completing his collegiate eligibility, he moved to Switzerland where he played for FC St. Gallen from 1991 to 1994. He then played for the North Jersey Imperials in the USISL before moving to the New York Fever. In February 1996, the New England Revolution selected Lips in the 1996 MLS Inaugural Player Draft. He played eight games with the Revs. On March 29, 1997, the Long Island Rough Riders of the USISL signed Lips. In 1999, he played for the Boston Bulldogs in the USL A-League. Lips played several games with the Puerto Rico national football team.

He has coached the Smithtown West High School boys soccer team. In 2006, he was hired to coach the Long Island Lady Riders in the USL W-League. He also coaches and trains with U12 kids on the Smithtown kickers program.
