= Patrick Olalere =

Nigerian footballer and manager

Personal information
- Date of birth: 28 April 1972 (age 54)
- Place of birth: Lagos, Nigeria
- Height: 1.88 m (6 ft 2 in)
- Position: Striker

Team information
- Current team: Myrtle Beach FC (manager)

Youth career
- 1991–1992: Carson-Newman College

Senior career*
Years	Team	Apps	(Gls)
1993	Charleston Battery	15	(5)
1994	New Orleans Riverboat Gamblers		(7)
1994	Fort Lauderdale Strikers	?	(2)
1995–1996	Charleston Battery	28	(30)
1997	New England Revolution	1	(0)
1997	Jacksonville Cyclones	5	(0)
1997–1998	Charleston Battery	25	(12)
1998	Staten Island Vipers	8	(0)
1999	South Carolina Shamrocks	6	(3)
- * Club domestic league appearances and goals

Patrick Olalere (born 28 April 1972) is a Nigerian football manager and former player. He is the current coach of the Myrtle Beach FC. A former professional player, he was active primarily in the United States, he played as a striker.

== Career ==
=== College career ===
Olalere was born in Lagos, Nigeria. He played college soccer at Carson-Newman College.

=== Professional career ===
In the summer of 1993, Olalere played for the Charleston Battery of the USISL. In the fall of 1993, Olalere had an unsuccessful trial with the Buffalo Blizzard of the National Professional Soccer League. In the spring of 1994, he signed with the New Orleans Riverboat Gamblers. After an outstanding start to the season, scoring seven goals, the Fort Lauderdale Strikers of the American Professional Soccer League signed Olalere. He finished the season with the Strikers, scoring only two goals. He returned to the Charleston Battery in 1995 and remained with them until 1998, scoring 47 goals in 83 games. In 1997, the New England Revolution selected him in the 1997 MLS Supplemental Draft. He played one game before being released on April 16, 1997. He then moved to the Jacksonville Cyclones before finishing the season with the Battery. In 1998, he began the season with the Battery, but finished it with the Staten Island Vipers. In 1999, Olalere finished his career with the South Carolina Shamrocks.

== Managerial career ==
In November 2011 he became head coach of the Myrtle Beach FC of the National Premier Soccer League (NPSL).
