= Jeff Zaun =

American soccer player (born 1971)

Personal information
- Date of birth: April 2, 1971 (age 55)
- Place of birth: Orange, New Jersey, United States
- Height: 6 ft 0 in (1.83 m)
- Position: Defender

College career
Years	Team	Apps	(Gls)
1989–1993	Rutgers Scarlet Knights		

Senior career*
Years	Team	Apps	(Gls)
1994–1995	North Jersey Imperials		
1996–1998	MetroStars	35	(0)
1999	Chicago Fire	1	(0)
1999	Lehigh Valley Steam	19	(0)
2000	Long Island Rough Riders	12	(0)

Managerial career
- 1994: Drew Rangers (assistant)
- 1999: Lehigh Valley Steam
- 2001–2008: Rutgers Scarlet Knights (assistant)
- * Club domestic league appearances and goals

Jeff Zaun (born April 2, 1971) is a retired American soccer defender who has also served as an assistant coach with the Rutgers University men's soccer team. He played professionally in Major League Soccer, USISL and the USL A-League and coached one season in the USL A-League.

== Playing career ==
=== Early career ===
Zaun was born in Orange, New Jersey. He played soccer at Holy Cross High School where he was a 1986 and 1987 New Jersey first team All State player. He finished high school at Shawnee High School where he was the 1988 New Jersey Player of the Year. Shawnee won the Group 4 NJ State Championship that season and finished as the #1 ranked team in New Jersey. In 1999, he was named by The Star-Ledger as one of the ten best New Jersey high school soccer players of the 1980s. He was also named as one of the top ten South Jersey high school players on the All Century team by the Philadelphia Inquirer. His 1988 Shawnee team was named the top high school team of the century by the Philadelphia Inquirer as well.

He then attended Rutgers University where he played on the men's soccer team from 1989 to 1993 where he played in two Final Fours and four NCAA tournaments. In 1990, Zaun moved from center midfield to sweeper after starting sweeper Alexi Lalas was diagnosed with an abscessed appendix. That year, Rutgers went to the NCAA Men's Soccer Championship where it finished runner-up to UCLA. Rutgers inducted Zaun into its Hall of Fame in 2006.

=== Club career ===
Zaun began his professional career with the expansion North Jersey Imperials of the USISL in 1994. On February 6, 1996, the MetroStars selected Zaun in the 4th round (39th overall) of the 1996 MLS Inaugural Player Draft. He spent three seasons in New Jersey, but saw time in only four games in 1998 due to injuries in his final season. The MetroStars waived Zaun on February 25, 1999. On March 1, 1999, the Chicago Fire claimed Zaun off the waiver list. After playing with the Fire for part of one season Zaun moved on to play and coach for the Lehigh Valley Steam of the USL A-League. The Steam qualified for the playoffs in their inaugural season. Zaun retired after that season and began his coaching career.

== Managerial career ==
After graduating from Rutgers in 1994, Zaun briefly coached as an assistant with Drew University. He returned to coaching in 1999 when he was a player-coach with the Lehigh Valley Steam of the USL A-League. Following his retirement from playing professionally, Zaun joined the Rutgers University soccer team as an assistant coach then moved up to Associate Head Coach since 2003.
