= Pat O'Kelly =

Irish footballer

Personal information
- Date of birth: July 31, 1967 (age 59)
- Place of birth: Dublin, Ireland
- Position: Defender

Youth career
- Home Farm
- 1986–1989: Seton Hall University

Senior career*
| Years | Team | Apps | (Gls) |
| 1990–1991 | Penn-Jersey Spirit | | |
| 1994–1995 | North Jersey Imperials | | |
| 1996–1997 | Central Jersey Riptide | | |
| 1998 | South Jersey Barons | | (1) |
- * Club domestic league appearances and goals

Pat O'Kelly (born 31 July 1967 in Dublin) is an Irish former soccer defender who was a two-time first team All-American at Seton Hall University. He played two seasons in the American Professional Soccer League and at least four in the USISL.

O'Kelly played for Home Farm as a youth player. He then represented Ireland at the 1985 FIFA World Youth Championship. In 1986, he moved to attend Seton Hall University where he played on the men's soccer team until 1989. He sits fourth on the team's career goals list with 42. He was a 1988 and 1989 first team All-American. In 1990, he signed with the Penn-Jersey Spirit of the American Professional Soccer League (APSL). On March 10, 1994, he signed with the expansion North Jersey Imperials of USISL. In January 1996, O'Kelly attended trials with Major League Soccer. This led to his selection by the MetroStars in the 10th round (99th overall) in the 1996 MLS Inaugural Player Draft, but he chose not to sign with the team. Instead, he signed with the Central Jersey Riptide of the USISL on April 25, 1996 He was selected to the 1996 USISL All Pro League Team, having scored thirteen goals. He continued with the Riptide through at least the 1997 season. In 1998, he played for the South Jersey Barons.
