= Damian Silvera =

American soccer player

Personal information
- Full name: Damian Troy Silvera
- Date of birth: July 27, 1974
- Place of birth: Flushing, NY, US
- Date of death: June 14, 2010 (aged 35)
- Place of death: Houston, TX, US
- Height: 5 ft 8 in (1.73 m)
- Position: Midfielder

College career
Years	Team	Apps	(Gls)
1992–1995	Virginia Cavaliers		

Senior career*
Years	Team	Apps	(Gls)
1996	MetroStars	17	(0)
1997	Kansas City Wizards	3	(0)
- Richmond Kickers
Total		20	(0)

International career
- United States U23
- United States

Managerial career
- 2001–2002: Soccer Alley
- * Club domestic league appearances and goals

Damian Troy Silvera (July 27, 1974 – June 14, 2010) was a professional American soccer player and coach.

He spent a season and a half in Major League Soccer and was a member of the United States national team at the 1996 Olympics.

== Early life and career ==
Silvera grew up in Huntington, New York and attended Shenendehowa High School in Clifton Park, New York where he played on the boys soccer team. In his junior and senior years, he was named as an All-American high school player. He won two NY state championships and a national championship while at Shenendehowa.

After graduating from high school, Silvera attended the University of Virginia where he played as a midfielder on the men's soccer team from 1992 to 1995. He was part of three NCAA championship teams as the Cavaliers took the title in 1992, 1993 and 1994. In 1994, he was the NCAA tournament Offensive MVP and a second team All-American. He graduated as Virginia's all-time leader in assists.

== Club career ==
=== NY/NJ MetroStars ===
As Major League Soccer (MLS) began preparations for its first season, it signed known players to contracts. From this pool of players, the league allocated four to each team in order to ensure an initial equitable distribution of talent. On February 5, 1996, MLS allocated Silvera to the NY/NJ MetroStars. Eddie Firmani, coach of the MetroStars had requested Silvera based on his standout performances with the University of Virginia and the U.S. B-Teams. Firmani saw Silvera growing into the role of creative midfielder with the MetroStars.

During the middle of the 1996 season, Silvera left the MetroStars to join the U.S. national team for the 1996 Olympics. The U.S. went a disappointing 1-1-1 and failed to make the second round. Silvera then rejoined the MetroStars, where it was becoming apparent that he would not become a creative force on the team. Silvera seemed to have difficulty adapting to the professional game and the burden of pre-season expectations wore on him. By the end of the season, the MetroStars coaching staff had moved him to defensive midfielder, but he never adapted to this role either.

=== Kansas City Wizards ===
On February 3, 1997, the MetroStars traded Silvera to the Kansas City Wizards for Mike Sorber and the first round pick in the 1998 MLS College Draft. However, he appeared in only three games, one as a starter and the Wizards released him.

=== Richmond Kickers ===
His time in MLS finished, he briefly joined the Richmond Kickers of the USISL A-League before retiring from playing. There were later rumors that he had issues with depression.

== International career ==
While in college, he was called up to the U.S. B-Team. In the early 1990s, the United States Soccer Federation (USSF) signed players to national team contracts. These players formed the A-Team. Fringe or up and coming players were part of the B-Team, those members of the national team pool not under contract. The B-Team also served as the core for the junior national teams. In 1994, Silvera began playing with the B-Team. This led to selection for the U.S. national team at the 1995 Pan American Games.

== Coaching career ==
In 2001–2002, Silvera coached Soccer Alley, a team in the Second Division of the Atlanta District Amateur Soccer League.

== Honors ==
Individual

- MLS All-Star: 1997
