= John Diffley (soccer) =

American soccer player and coach

Personal information
- Full name: John Diffley
- Date of birth: January 11, 1967 (age 59)
- Place of birth: New City, New York, U.S.
- Height: 5 ft 9 in (1.75 m)
- Position: Midfielder

Youth career
- 1985–1988: American University

Senior career*
Years	Team	Apps	(Gls)
1989	Albany Capitals		
1989–1991	Atlanta Attack (indoor)		
1991	Penn-Jersey Spirit	17	(0)
1992–1993	Haarlem		
1994	North Jersey Imperials		
1995	Long Island Rough Riders		
1996	Tampa Bay Mutiny	13	(0)
1997	Kansas City Wizards	6	(0)
1998–1999	Staten Island Vipers	32	(0)
2003	New York Freedom	6	(0)

International career
1988	United States	7	(0)

Managerial career
- 1995–1996: Dominican College
- 1997–2001: St. John's University (assistant)
- 2003: New York Freedom (assistant)
- * Club domestic league appearances and goals

John Diffley (born January 11, 1967) is an American retired soccer player and college athletics administrator. A midfielder, he earned seven caps for the United States in 1988, and played in Major League Soccer for the Tampa Bay Mutiny and the Kansas City Wizards. He has worked in athletics administration at St. John's University since 2004, and was named its interim athletic director in 2024.

== Youth and college ==
Diffley attended Albertus Magnus High School in Rockland, New York, where he played on the soccer team from 1981 to 1984. He was a Parade High School All-American in 1984, and was later inducted into the school's hall of fame. In 1985, he entered American University, where he spent four seasons as a midfielder. During his freshman year, American reached the NCAA title game, where the Eagles lost to the University of California, Los Angeles in eight overtimes. Diffley was twice named to the Colonial Athletic Association first team and was American's Male Scholar-Athlete of the Year in 1988. He graduated in 1989, and the university inducted him into its athletics hall of fame in 2006.

== Professional ==
Diffley began his professional career in 1989 with the Albany Capitals of the American Soccer League (ASL). After the ASL season, he signed with the Atlanta Attack, an indoor expansion team in the American Indoor Soccer Association (AISA). The Attack finished second in the 1989–1990 standings and reached the playoff semifinals, where they lost to the Dayton Dynamo. In the 1990 off-season, the AISA renamed itself the National Professional Soccer League (NPSL); the Attack again finished second, but lost to Dayton in the first round of the playoffs. That summer, Diffley moved to the Penn-Jersey Spirit of the American Professional Soccer League (APSL).

Diffley then sought a career in Europe, and spent the 1992–1993 season with Dutch Second Division club HFC Haarlem. In 1994, he joined the North Jersey Imperials of the USISL, where he was captain and was named to the USISL All-Star team. In 1995, he signed with the Long Island Rough Riders, who won the USISL national championship that year; Diffley was named to the championship all-tournament team.

The Tampa Bay Mutiny of Major League Soccer (MLS) selected Diffley in the third round, 27th overall, of the league's inaugural player draft. He made 13 appearances for Tampa Bay in 1996, six of them starts, and six for the Kansas City Wizards in 1997. When the Wizards released him, Diffley became a full-time coach, but he continued to play for the Staten Island Vipers in 1998 and 1999. In 2003, he was a player-assistant coach with the New York Freedom.

== Coaching ==
In 1995, Diffley became the head coach of the Dominican College men's soccer team. After two seasons, he moved to St. John's University in 1997, where he spent four years as an assistant coach with the men's soccer team and earned a master's degree in business administration.

== Administration ==
In 2001, Diffley left St. John's and spent three years working in financial services for State Street Capital. On January 1, 2004, he returned to St. John's as senior associate athletic director for administration. By the 2020–21 academic year, he was the department's deputy athletics director and chief operating officer, and on July 1, 2024, he was named interim athletic director. He also earned a doctorate in educational administration.

== National team ==
Diffley earned seven caps with the U.S. national team in 1988, when he was contending for a place on the U.S. team for the 1988 Summer Olympics. He made his debut as a substitute for Jeff Agoos in a 1–0 loss to Guatemala on January 10, 1988, and won his last cap as a substitute for Brian Bliss in a tie with Ecuador on June 12. He was named an alternate for the Olympic team.
