= Ian Hennessy =

Irish footballer

Personal information
- Date of birth: 10 January 1967 (age 59)
- Place of birth: Cork, Ireland
- Position: Midfielder

College career
Years	Team	Apps	(Gls)
1986–1989	Seton Hall		

Senior career*
Years	Team	Apps	(Gls)
1984–1985	Cork City F.C.		
1990–1991	Boston Bolts		
1993–1994	New York Fever		
1995–1996	New Jersey Stallions		
1996	→ MetroStars (loan)	8	(1)
1997	Connecticut Wolves	17	(1)
1998	Reading Rage		(0)

Managerial career
- North Jersey Imperials
- 2001: Rutgers (assistant)
- 2002–2005: Boston College (assistant)
- 2006–2021: Delaware
- * Club domestic league appearances and goals

Ian Hennessy (born 10 January 1967) is an Irish soccer coach and former professional player who was most recently the head coach of the University of Delaware. He came to the United States after being rejected by Arsenal, then returned to Ireland, playing for Cork City in their inaugural season in the League of Ireland during 1984. He also played for the Ireland youth team.

He was an All-American and twice named Big East Most Outstanding Player whilst with Seton Hall, winning three Big East titles. He then went on to play professional soccer with the Boston Bolts, the New York Fever, the New Jersey Stallions, the Connecticut Wolves, the Reading Rage, and as part of the MetroStars squad under manager Carlos Queiroz in Major League Soccer (MLS) first season in 1996.

Hennessy holds a PhD in Molecular Biology from Columbia University in New York City and a bachelor's degree from Seton Hall.

He has worked as a state and regional coach for the Olympic Development Program (ODP) and served as an assistant to Bob Reasso at Rutgers University in the Big East and Ed Kelly of Boston College in the Atlantic Coast Conference (ACC). As well as coaching at the University of Delaware, he works as a scout for the United States Soccer Federation(USSF). He was the coach of the Blue Hens until 2021 when he was fired.
