= New York Centaurs =

New York Centaurs/Fever
- Full name: New York Centaurs (1995); New York Fever (1994–96)
- Nicknames: Centaurs, Fever
- Founded: 1994
- Dissolved: 1996
- Stadium: Downing Stadium; Randall's Island, New York
- Capacity: 22,000
- Owner(s): (United States) Roger Gorevic (England) Bob Butler
- General Manager: (United States) Len Roitman
- League: USL A-League
Home colors	Away colors

The New York Centaurs were a professional soccer club based in New York City that played in the A-League in 1995. Owned by Roger Gorevic, the Centaurs played at Downing Stadium on Randall's Island. During the season, Len Roitman stepped down as head coach to concentrate on his role as general manager and was succeeded by former New York Cosmos midfielder Vladislav Bogićević.

The Centaurs absorbed the New York Fever for the 1996 season and competed under the Fever name in the A-League. The Fever had been founded in 1994 by English businessman Bob Butler and had spent two seasons in the USISL, including the USISL Pro League. After the combined team's 1996 season, Gorevic moved the franchise to Staten Island, where the Staten Island Vipers subsequently began A-League play in 1998.

== History ==
The saga of the New York Centaurs/Fever began in 1994 when English businessman Bob Butler launched the first pro soccer club in the New York City area since the NASL New York Cosmos of the 1970s and 1980s. Butler founded the New York Fever as a USISL Pro League team in 1994 with the objective of building a robust franchise and soccer training center for the large and untapped population and youth of New York City. The team's coach was George Vizvary.

The New York Centaurs, owned by Roger Gorevic, debuted in 1995 at Downing Stadium to considerably small fanfare. The Centaurs started their season under coach Len Roitman, who would step down amid poor results to focus on his role as general manager, making way for former Cosmos star midfielder, Yugoslavian Vladislav Bogićević. The team would absorb the lower tiered New York Fever for the 1996 season and compete under the Fever name. For the 1996 season, Goervic brought in Tom Neale to be the team's General Manager. Neale in turn brought in Mike Winograd, his college roommate and teammate at Lafayette College, to head up ticket sales, marketing and team development. After one season, Gorevic moved the franchise to Staten Island and tapped Neale and Winograd to start up a new team there. The franchise was named the Staten Island Vipers, which began play in the A-League in 1998. Neale ultimately went on to be General Manager of the San Jose Earthquakes and COO of the MetroStars of MLS. Winograd, a former professional soccer player in Kfar Saba, Israel and assistant soccer coach at the University of Richmond, went on to law school at the University of Pennsylvania.

== Players ==
Fever
- (United States) Jorge Acosta
- (Morocco) Khalil Azmi
- (United States) John DeBrito
- (England) Carlton Fairweather
- (Republic of Ireland) Ian Hennessy
- (United States) Matt Kmosko
- (United States) Mickey Kydes
- (United States) Jim St. Andre
- (United States) Peter Vermes
- (United States) Cordt Weinstein
Centaurs
- (United States) Dan Calichman
- (Argentina) Marcelo Carrera
- (United States) Sadri Gjonbalaj
- (United States) Mirsad Huseinovic
- (United States) Carlos Llamosa
- (United States) Janusz Michallik
- (United States) Bo Oshoniyi
- (United States) Jim St. Andre
- (United States) Lee Tschantret
- (United States) David Vaudreuil

== Ownership and staff ==
- (United States) Len Roitman – General Manager (1995–96)
- (United States) Howard Rubenstein – Director of Field Operations

== Head coaches ==
- (United States) Len Roitman (1995)
- (Socialist Federal Republic of Yugoslavia) Vladislav Bogićević (1995–96)

== A-League New York Centaurs/Fever year-by-year ==
Year	Division	League	Reg. season	Playoffs	Open Cup
1995	2	A-League	6th	Did not qualify	Quarterfinals
1996	2	A-League	6th	Did not qualify	Did not qualify

== Ownership and staff ==
- (United States) Roger Gorevic
- (England) Bob Butler

== Head coaches ==
- (United States) George Vizvary

== USISL New York Fever year-by-year ==
Year	Division	League	Reg. season	Playoffs	Open Cup
1994	N/A	USISL	6th, Northeast	Did not qualify	Did not enter
1995	N/A	USISL Pro League	1st, Capital	Sizzling Nine	Did not qualify

== See also ==
- New York Cosmos
- Rochester Rhinos
- New York Red Bulls
