= Chris Unger =

American soccer player

Personal information
- Full name: Chris Unger
- Date of birth: March 4, 1968 (age 58)
- Place of birth: Brooklyn, New York, United States
- Height: 5 ft 9 in (1.75 m)
- Position: Defender

Youth career
- Princeton Tigers

Senior career*
Years	Team	Apps	(Gls)
1996	MetroStars	16	(1)
Total		16	(1)
- * Club domestic league appearances and goals

Chris Unger (born March 4, 1968) is an American retired professional soccer player.

== Playing career ==
Unger was signed to a playing contract after already working in the MetroStars front office as the team's director of administration in 1996.

== Statistics ==
Club performance			League		Cup		League Cup		Continental		Total	
Season	Club	League	Apps	Goals	Apps	Goals	Apps	Goals	Apps	Goals	Apps	Goals
United States			League		Open Cup		League Cup		North America		Total	
1996	MetroStars	MLS	16	1	0	0	0	0	0	0	16	1
Career total			16	1	0	0	0	0	0	0	16	1
