= Mickey Kydes =

American soccer player (born 1964)

Personal information
- Date of birth: July 25, 1964 (age 62)
- Height: 5 ft 11 in (1.80 m)
- Position: Midfielder

Youth career
- 1982–1985: Long Island University

Senior career*
Years	Team	Apps	(Gls)
1954–1966	Dallas Sidekicks (indoor)	29	(1)
- Aris
- Kallithea
- Eordaikos
1991–1992	Greek American AA		
1993	Connecticut Wolves		
1994	New York Pancyprian-Freedoms		
1995	New York Fever		
1996	NY/NJ MetroStars	11	(0)
1997	Long Island Rough Riders	2	(0)
- * Club domestic league appearances and goals

Mickey Kydes (born July 25, 1964) is an American retired soccer midfielder who played professionally in the Major Indoor Soccer League, USISL and Major League Soccer. He also spent three seasons in Greece and several in the semi-professional Cosmopolitan Soccer League.

== Youth ==
Kydes played soccer at Norwalk High School from 1978 to 1981. He then attended Long Island University where he was a 1983 and 1985 third team All-American. He finished his career with 34 goals and 35 assists. He graduated with a bachelor's degree in marketing in 1986. Long Island University inducted Kydes into its Hall of Fame in 2005.

== Professional ==
On June 7, 1986, the Dallas Sidekicks selected Kydes in the Major Indoor Soccer League draft. He played twenty-nine games with the Sidekicks as the team won the MISL championship before being released on July 2, 1987. That summer, he played for the U.S. soccer team at the 1987 Pan American Games.

In 1988, he moved to Greece where he spent the three season playing for Aris Thessaloniki F.C. of the Greek Alpha Ethniki, as well as Beta Ethniki clubs Kallithea F.C. and Eordaikos. In 1990, he returned to the United States. He played 1991 and 1992 with Greek American AA in the Cosmopolitan Soccer League.

In 1993, he was with the Connecticut Wolves in the USISL. He returned to the CSL in 1994, this time with the New York Pancyprian-Freedoms. He returned to the USISL in 1995 with the New York Fever. On February 7, 1996, the New York/New Jersey MetroStars selected Kydes in the 11th round (109th) overall in the 1996 MLS Inaugural Player Draft. He played eleven games for the MetroStars during the first half of the season, then retired on June 16, 1996. In 1997, he returned to play two games for the Long Island Rough Riders of the USISL.

He currently owns Mickey Kydes Soccer Enterprises, which provides professional coaching support and planning services to youth soccer clubs, and operates Mickey Kydes Soccer Camps and is president of Beachside Soccer Club of CT a premier soccer program for elite youth players. He coaches the u17s. Kydes started Beachside, which is non-profit, in 1994 and it has grown into one of the more successful clubs of its kind in the Northeastern U.S.

In 2008, Connecticut Soccer Hall of Fame inducted Kydes.
