= Mike Sorber =

American soccer coach and former player (born 1971)

Personal information
- Full name: Michael Steven Sorber
- Date of birth: May 14, 1971 (age 55)
- Place of birth: St. Louis, Missouri, United States
- Height: 5 ft 10 in (1.78 m)
- Position: Midfielder

Team information
- Current team: New York Red Bulls (assistant)

College career
Years	Team	Apps	(Gls)
1989–1992	Saint Louis Billikens		

Senior career*
Years	Team	Apps	(Gls)
1994–1996	UNAM	51	(1)
1996	Kansas City Wizards	22	(4)
1997–1999	MetroStars	74	(4)
2000	Chicago Fire	19	(1)
Total		166	(10)

International career
1992–1998	United States	67	(2)

Managerial career
- 2025–2026: St. Louis City SC (academy)
Medal record
Representing United States
Third place	CONCACAF Gold Cup	1996
Men's Soccer
- * Club domestic league appearances and goals

Michael Steven Sorber (born May 14, 1971) is an American soccer coach and former player. He is currently the assistant coach of Major League Soccer club New York Red Bulls. He played professionally in the United States and Mexico and was a member of the U.S. national team at the 1994 FIFA World Cup.

== Youth and college ==
Sorber was born and raised in Florissant, Missouri in the St. Louis area, where his father Pete Sorber was the head coach of the St. Louis Community College-Florissant Valley men's soccer team for 30 years. During those years, he led the college to 10 National Junior College Athletic Association national championships.

Under his father's tutelage, Mike developed into a polished youth player. He played boys' soccer at St. Thomas Aquinas-Mercy High School where he was part of two Missouri state championship teams in 1985 and 1988. His senior year, he was honored as part of the All-Great Midwest Conference team and was the North MVP at the St. Louis North-South High School Senior All-Star Game.

After graduating from high school in 1989, Sorber played NCAA soccer with the Saint Louis University men's soccer team. He was part of the Billikens’ 1991 Final Four appearance in the NCAA tournament and was a 1992 Hermann Trophy finalist. He ended his career at St. Louis with 13 goals and 29 assists. While he finished his college playing career in 1992, Sorber continued to work on his college education and graduated in 1994 with a bachelor's degree in communications with a minor in criminal justice.

== Mexico ==
After spending two years contracted to the U.S. national team leading up to the 1994 World Cup, Sorber moved to Mexico to play first division soccer with UNAM. He played two seasons with Pumas.

== MLS ==
In 1996, Sorber signed a contract with the newly established Major League Soccer (MLS). MLS allocated Sorber to Kansas City Wiz. However, he played only a single season with the Wiz before being traded to MetroStars for Damian Silvera on February 1, 1997.

Sorber played three years with MetroStars but the team made the playoffs only in 1998. MetroStars waived Sorber on February 21, 2000. He was claimed by New England Revolution but then traded to Chicago Fire during the 2000 preseason for a fourth-round pick in the 2001 MLS SuperDraft. Sorber played only one year with Chicago, helping the club win the Central Division title and reach the 2000 MLS Cup final. In five years in the league, he scored nine goals and added 17 assists, plus a goal and five assists in the playoffs.

== International career ==
Sorber earned his first cap with the national team in a January 25, 1992 loss to the Commonwealth of Independent States team. He would go on to earn a total of 67 caps, scoring 2 goals with the national team.

Sorber played in the 1994 FIFA World Cup held in his home country. Following the tournament, national team coach Bora Milutinović stated "When you analyze the World Cup, Sorber was probably our MVP. It is difficult for me to explain what I feel about him. He is disciplined and intelligent." He earned his final cap in a 1998 friendly against Paraguay. Although named as an alternate for the 1998 FIFA World Cup team, he was not chosen for the final roster.

== Coaching ==
Sorber retired in February 2001 and returned to his alma mater, Saint Louis University, where he joined the Billikens as their assistant coach.

Sorber was an assistant coach for the U.S. men's national team. He was named to the position by head coach Bob Bradley in May 2007.

On October 5, 2011, MLS expansion side Montreal Impact announced that Sorber had joined the club as an assistant coach. In January 2013, following the departure of head coach Jesse Marsch, the Montreal Impact announced that it will not retain the services of Mike Sorber for the 2013 season. On February 1, 2014, Sorber was hired by the Philadelphia Union of MLS as an assistant coach. He was named the Director of Soccer Operations for LAFC in 2017.

On January 19, 2022, Sorber joined Toronto FC as an assistant coach/Technical Director, reuniting with Bradley after the latter had been named the club's head coach and sporting director. On June 26, 2023, following the dismissal of Bradley, TFC announced that Sorber would not remain with the team.

== Career statistics ==
=== International ===
Scores and results list United States' goal tally first, score column indicates score after each Sorber goal.

List of international goals scored by Mike Sorber
No.	Date	Venue	Opponent	Result	Competition
1	September 3, 1992	Canada Games Stadium, Saint John, New Brunswick, Canada	Canada	2–0	Friendly
2	April 16, 1994	Sam W. Wolfson Baseball Park, Jacksonville, Florida, United States	Moldova	1–1	Friendly
