= Cristian da Silva =

Argentine footballer

Personal information
- Date of birth: 3 February 1971 (age 55)
- Place of birth: Rosario, Argentina
- Positions: Defender; midfielder

College career
Years	Team	Apps	(Gls)
1990–1993	Southern Connecticut State University		

Senior career*
Years	Team	Apps	(Gls)
1994–1996	New Jersey Stallions		
1996–1998	MetroStars	37	(0)
1998–1999	Staten Island Vipers		
- * Club domestic league appearances and goals

Cristian da Silva (born 3 February 1971) is an Argentine former professional footballer who played in the United States for the MetroStars.
