= Rhett Harty =

American soccer defender (born 1970)

Personal information
- Full name: Rhett Stowe Harty
- Date of birth: March 8, 1970 (age 56)
- Place of birth: Pasadena, California, United States
- Height: 6 ft 1 in (1.85 m)
- Position: Defender

College career
Years	Team	Apps	(Gls)
1988–1993	Stanford		

Senior career*
Years	Team	Apps	(Gls)
1989	San Francisco Bay Blackhawks		
1995	San Jose Grizzlies (indoor)	7	(2)
1995	Monterey Bay Jaguars		
1996–1998	MetroStars	64	(1)
- * Club domestic league appearances and goals

Rhett Stowe Harty (born March 8, 1970, in Pasadena, California) is an American former soccer defender who spent one season in the Western Soccer League, one in the Continental Indoor Soccer League, one in the USISL and three with the MetroStars of Major League Soccer.

== Career ==
=== High School and college ===
Harty grew up in Los Angeles and attended Servite High School where he played on the boys’ soccer team. He was a Parade Magazine high school All American in 1987 and 1988. After graduating from Servite in 1988, he entered Stanford University. He played three years, then red shirted a season while he played with the U.S. Olympic soccer team as it qualified for the 1992 Summer Olympics in Barcelona. A late injury kept him from travelling with the team. He returned to Stanford and graduated in 1993 with a bachelor's degree in history and classical studies. During his final year of college, Harty had an internship with an electrophysiology doctor. After graduation, the doctor offered him a position in his practice, but Harty declined and became a professional soccer player instead.

=== Minor leagues ===
In 1989, Harty spent the collegiate off season with the San Francisco Bay Blackhawks of the Western Soccer League (WSL). After graduating from Stanford, Harty was sidelined for nearly two years with a back injury. In 1994, he signed with the expansion San Jose Grizzlies of the Continental Indoor Soccer League. In 1995, he moved to the Monterey Bay Jaguars of USISL.

=== MLS ===
In February 1996, the San Jose Clash drafted Harty in the fourth round of the 1996 MLS Inaugural Player Draft; however, he never played a game for his hometown club. When Troy Dayak, who was drafted by the MetroStars, demanded a trade to San Jose, Harty was shipped cross-country in the first trade in MLS history.

Harty, a midfielder initially, immediately stepped into the Metro defense. After the team struggled early in the year, he shaved his head, and the Metros went on to win their next three games. The head would stay shaven throughout his MLS career, and Harty quickly became a fan favorite, earning the nickname Mr. Clean. He scored one goal and three assists in his three years in the league, plus added a goal in Open Cup play.

Rhett was on the forefront in the MLS players' antitrust lawsuit against the league, challenging its single entity structure. Lowballed with a small offer, he chose to retire from soccer instead.

== Post soccer career ==
Following his retirement from professional soccer, Harty spent the next six months traveling in India and Tibet, soul-searching and helping out the people of the area. He found a new calling in medicine, and moved to the Portland, Oregon, area, where he prepares pacemakers and defibrillators for patients as an employee of St. Jude Medical.
