= Miles Joseph =

American soccer player & coach (born 1974)

Personal information
- Full name: Miles Thomas Joseph
- Date of birth: May 2, 1974 (age 52)
- Place of birth: West Springfield, Massachusetts, U.S.
- Height: 5 ft 9 in (1.75 m)
- Positions: Defender; midfielder; forward

Team information
- Current team: Charlotte FC (associate head coach)

College career
Years	Team	Apps	(Gls)
1992–1995	Clemson Tigers		

Senior career*
Years	Team	Apps	(Gls)
1996–2000	MetroStars	96	(10)
2000	Columbus Crew	20	(2)
2001	Dallas Burn	9	(0)
2003	Dallas Sidekicks (indoor)	7	(0)

International career
1996–1997	United States	3	(0)

Managerial career
- 2003–2005: Siena Saints (assistant)
- 2010–2014: Real Salt Lake (assistant)
- 2014–2015: New York City FC (assistant)
- 2016–2018: Orlando City (assistant)
- 2018–2023: Portland Timbers (assistant)
- 2023: Portland Timbers (interim)
- 2024–: Charlotte FC (associate head coach)
- * Club domestic league appearances and goals

Miles Joseph (born May 2, 1974) is an American soccer coach and former player who earned three caps with the United States national soccer team. He spent six seasons as a player in Major League Soccer and part of one season in Major Indoor Soccer League. He was also a member of the U.S. soccer team at the 1996 Summer Olympics. He currently serves as the associate head coach for Charlotte FC.

== Youth and college ==
While born in Massachusetts, Miles grew up in Clifton Park, New York, and graduated from Shenendehowa High School in 1992. During his high school career, he won three NY state championships and a national championship. He entered Clemson University in the fall of 1992. Miles stands on the Clemson University all-time record board as 3rd most career assists at 41.

== Professional ==
The MetroStars selected Miles in the second round (12th overall) in the 1996 MLS College Draft. He was with the MetroStars until they traded him to the Columbus Crew on May 3, 2000, for a second round 2001 draft pick. Joseph had a career 22 assists and 11 goals for the MEtrostars/RedBUlls Joseph finished the 2000 season with Columbus before being traded to the Dallas Burn for the 2001 season. At the end of the season, the Burn released him. On February 13, 2003, the Dallas Sidekicks signed Miles as a free agent. He played only seven games with the Sidekicks in the 2002–03 season before leaving the team to become an assistant coach with the Siena College women's soccer team on August 5, 2003.

Miles served four years as an assistant coach for Major League Soccer's Real Salt Lake. As an assistant with Kries, Miles coached in an MLS Cup final, a CONCACAF final and an Open Cup final. Jason Kreis, the New York City FC head coach who knew Joseph from their times working together at Real Salt Lake, named Miles Joseph as the first assistant coach of New York City FC in 2014. New York City FC debuted as a club in the 2015 Major League Soccer season.

On November 2, 2015, New York City FC, disappointed with not making the 2015 MLS Cup Playoffs, announced they had parted ways with Head Coach Jason Kreis as well as Joseph and assistant C. J. Brown after just one year of management and would be looking for a new head coach for the following season.

Miles Joseph served as an assistant coach at Orlando City SC from 2016 to 2018.

In August 2018, Miles Joseph was hired by the Portland Timbers to be an assistant coach. As an assistant with Savarese, Miles coached in 2 MLS Cups and won the MLS is Back tournament.

On August 21, 2023, the Portland Timbers appointed Joseph to the role of interim head coach for the remainder of the 2023 MLS season, following the dismissal of manager Giovanni Savarese. On October 6, 2023, The Oregonian reported that Joseph is one of the final candidates for the Timbers managerial role in 2024. Joseph's win percentage as an interim head coach place him at #2 ALL TIME in the history of MLS interim head coaches for win percentage and points per game. For the 2023 MLS regular season schedule, Joseph placed #1 for goals per game. #3 for goal differential, #3 for winning percentage and #4 for points per compared when compared to all other MLS coaches.

Joseph joined Charlotte FC as the associate head coach to head coach Dean Smith on January 24, 2024.

== National teams ==
Joseph was selected for the roster of the U.S. team at the 1993 U-20 World Cup held in Australia. He scored a goal in the 6–0 victory over Turkey. The U.S. went 1–1–1 in group play, qualifying for the second round where it fell to Brazil. In 1996, U.S. coach Bruce Arena named Joseph to the U.S. soccer team at the 1996 Summer Olympics. Once again, the team went 1–1–1, but this time failed to make the second round. Joseph earned his first cap with the U.S. national soccer team when he came on for Cobi Jones in the 89th minute of a 3–1 win over El Salvador on August 30, 1996. He was again a late game substitute on December 21, 1996, in a 2–2 tie with Guatemala. He started his last national team game, a 2–1 loss to China, before coming off at halftime for Cobi Jones.
