= Rob Johnson (soccer) =

American soccer player and coach (born 1973)

Personal information
- Date of birth: February 10, 1973 (age 53)
- Place of birth: Freehold, New Jersey, (Note: It is not currently known whether this is Freehold Township, New Jersey or Freehold Borough, New Jersey.) United States
- Height: 5 ft 11 in (1.80 m)
- Position: Forward

College career
Years	Team	Apps	(Gls)
1991–1994	Rutgers Scarlet Knights		

Senior career*
Years	Team	Apps	(Gls)
1996	North Jersey Imperials		
1996–1997	MetroStars	20	(4)
1997	Hershey Wildcats		
1997–1998	Philadelphia KiXX (indoor)		
1998	Richmond Kickers	18	(3)
1999	Staten Island Vipers	19	(2)
1999	→ MetroStars (loan)	1	(0)
- * Club domestic league appearances and goals

Rob Johnson (born February 10, 1973) is an American former professional soccer player who is now an assistant coach with the Temple University's men's soccer team.

He attended Jackson Memorial High School in Jackson Township, New Jersey, graduating from the school in 1991. At Jackson, he also competed in track and field athletics, with his best efforts in high school including running the 40 yard dash in 4.4 seconds, a long jump of 21 feet 6 inches and a high jump of 6 feet eight inches. Johnson was a two-time state champion in wrestling and was recognized with all-state honors during his senior year in both wrestling and track and field. In 1999, he was named by The Star-Ledger as one of the top ten New Jersey high school soccer players of the 1990s. Johnson was one of four of the Star-Ledger's top 10 players of the 1990s who played for the New York/New Jersey MetroStars/Red Bulls, joining Claudio Reyna, Petter Villegas and Billy Walsh.

Johnson played college soccer at Rutgers University. Johnson scored 35 goals and 20 assists in his four seasons at Rutgers, with his 90 points ranking him 6th all-time at Rutgers. He scored 13 goals and nine assists as a freshman, and followed that with 13 goals and seven assists in his sophomore year, leading the team to the NCAA tournament semifinals in 1994.

He played for the New York/New Jersey MetroStars in the 1996 season after being recalled from the North Jersey Imperials. In his three seasons with the MetroStars (mostly in 1996, plus two games in 1997 and a single game in 1999), he scored four goals and had three assists. He played his first game with the team on June 19, 1996, a scoreless tie against the Dallas Burn (now known as FC Dallas). His first goal came on July 24, 1996, the game winner for the MetroStars in a 1–0 victory over the San Jose Clash (now the San Jose Earthquakes). He played in three playoff games with the MetroStars in 1996. On October 2, 1996, a last-minute foul by Johnson on DC United's Marco Etcheverry led to a penalty kick that effectively ended the Metros' season. Johnson came back to the MetroStars in 1999 on a one-game loan from the Staten Island Vipers.

Johnson had been a head coach at Gloucester County College and is now an assistant coach at Temple University.
