= United States men's national soccer team results (1990–1999) =

This is a compilation of every international soccer game played by the United States men's national soccer team from 1990 through 1999. It includes the team's record for that year, each game and the date played. It also lists the U.S. goal scorers.

The format is: home team listed first, U.S. listed first at home or neutral site.

Records are in win–loss–tie format. Games decided in penalty kicks are counted as ties, as per the FIFA standard.

== 1990 ==
Wins	Losses	Draws
8	11	3

Win Draw Loss

February 2 Marlboro Cup SF	United States	0–2	Costa Rica	Miami, Florida
		Report	Cayasso 9'; Diaz 62'	Stadium: Orange Bowl; Attendance: 25,392

February 4 Marlboro Cup 3rd	United States	1–1 (8–9 p)	Colombia	Miami, Florida
	Wynalda 4'		Fajardo 25'	Stadium: Orange Bowl; Attendance: 15,231; Referee: Vincent Mauro (United States)

February 13 Friendly	Bermuda	0–1	United States	Hamilton, Bermuda
			Sullivan	Stadium: National Stadium; Attendance: 1,800

February 24 Friendly	United States	1–3	Soviet Union	Palo Alto, California
	Harkes 41' (pen.)	Report	Bessonov 29'; Cherenkov 45'; Protasov 68'	Stadium: Stanford Stadium; Attendance: 61,000; Referee: Vincent Mauro (United States)

March 10 Friendly	United States	2–1	Finland	Tampa, Florida
	Caligiuri; Murray		Tarkkio	Stadium: Tampa Stadium; Attendance: 22,647; Referee: Carlos Arrieta (Costa Rica)

March 20 Friendly	Hungary	2–0	United States	Budapest, Hungary
	Petres; Limperger			Stadium: Stadion Albert Flórián; Attendance: 9,000; Referee: Heinz Holzmann (Austria)

March 28 Friendly	East Germany	3–2	United States	Berlin, East Germany
	Kirsten 17', 31', 66'		Vermes 41'; Murray 86'	Stadium: Sportforum Hohenschönhausen; Attendance: 4,000; Referee: Wolf-Günter Wiesel (West Germany)

April 8 Friendly	United States	4–1	Iceland	Fenton, Missouri
	Wynalda; Trittschuh; Murray		Pétursson 85' (pen.)	Stadium: St. Louis Soccer Park; Attendance: 3,287; Referee: Antonio Marín Navarrete (Spain)

April 22 Friendly	United States	0–1	Colombia	Miami, Florida
			Guerrero	Stadium: Joe Robbie Stadium; Attendance: 8,214; Referee: Edson Curtis (Bermuda)

May 5 Friendly	United States	1–0	Malta	Piscataway, New Jersey
	Wynalda			Stadium: Rutgers Stadium; Attendance: 8,064; Referee: Arturo Angeles (United States)

May 9 Friendly	United States	3–1	Poland	Hershey, Pennsylvania
	Murray 31'; Vermes 57' (pen.); Sullivan 78'		Ziober 25'	Stadium: Hersheypark Stadium; Attendance: 12,063; Referee: John Purcell (Republic of Ireland)

May 30 Friendly	Liechtenstein	1–4	United States	Eschen, Liechtenstein
	Donath Marxer 11' (Note: The RSSSF archive made a mistake regarding the scorer of Lichtenstein's goal. They erroneously listed Peter Marxer, a Liechtensteiner politician, as the goalscorer. In reality, Donath Warner, an amateur Lichtensteiner footballer, scored the goal.)	Report	Vermes 10'; Balboa 53'; Wynalda 66'; Henderson 75'	Stadium: Sportpark Eschen-Mauren; Attendance: 2,400; Referee: Manfred Schlup (Switzerland)

June 2 Friendly	Switzerland	2–1	United States	St. Gallen, Switzerland
	Schepull; Knup		Murray	Stadium: Espenmoos Stadium; Attendance: 4,500; Referee: Keith Cooper (Wales)

June 10 World Cup GS	United States	1–5	Czechoslovakia	Florence, Italy
	Wynalda (red card) 52'; Caligiuri 60'		Skuhravy 26', 78'; Bilek 40' (pen.); Hašek 50'; Luhovy 90+3'	Stadium: Stadio Comunale; Attendance: 33,266; Referee: Kurt Röthlisberger (Switzerland)

June 14 World Cup GS	Italy	1–0	United States	Rome, Italy
	Giannini 11'			Stadium: Stadio Olimpico; Attendance: 73,423; Referee: Edgardo Codesal (Mexico)

June 19 World Cup GS	United States	1–2	Austria	Florence, Italy
	Murray 83'		Artner (red card) 34'; Ogris 49'; Rodax 63'	Stadium: Stadio Comunale; Attendance: 34,857; Referee: Jamal Al Sharif (Syria)

July 28 Friendly	United States	1–2	East Germany	Milwaukee, Wisconsin
	Eck 89'		Gerlach 34'; Rische 43'	Stadium: Milwaukee County Stadium; Attendance: 12,574; Referee: Alfred Kleinaitis (United States)

September 15 Friendly	United States	3–0	Trinidad and Tobago	High Point, North Carolina
	Vermes 15'; Murray 29'; Eichmann 46'			Stadium: A.J. Simeon Stadium; Attendance: 11,361; Referee: Ed Cummings (United States)

October 10 Friendly	Poland	2–3	United States	Warsaw, Poland
	Kosecki 48'; Ziober 61'		Murray 15'; Vermes 24', 44'	Stadium: Stadion Miejski Legii Warszawa; Attendance: 5,000; Referee: Werner Föckler (Germany)

November 18 Friendly	Trinidad and Tobago	0–0	United States	Port of Spain, Trinidad and Tobago
				Stadium: National Stadium; Attendance: 12,000

November 21 Friendly	United States	0–0	Soviet Union	Port of Spain, Trinidad and Tobago
		Report		Stadium: National Stadium; Attendance: 3,500

December 19 Friendly	Portugal	1–0	United States	Maia, Portugal
	Domingos 8'			Stadium: Estádio Municipal Dr. José Vieira de Carvalho; Attendance: 12,000; Referee: Joaquín Ramos (Spain)

== 1991 ==
Wins	Losses	Draws
8	4	5

Win Draw Loss

February 1 Friendly	United States	0–1	Switzerland	Miami, Florida
			Knup 89'	Stadium: Orange Bowl; Attendance: 10,323; Referee: Errol Forbes (Trinidad and Tobago)

February 21 Friendly	Bermuda	1–0	United States	Hamilton, Bermuda
	Burchall 89'			Stadium: National Stadium; Attendance: 12,000; Referee: Mario López (Guatemala)

March 12 North American Nations Cup	United States	2–2	Mexico	Los Angeles, California
	Washington 44'; Murray 89'		Valdéz 53'; Espinoza 75'; García Aspe (red card) 84'	Stadium: Los Angeles Memorial Coliseum; Attendance: 5,261; Referee: Mario López (Guatemala)

March 16 North American Nations Cup	United States	2–0	Canada	Torrance, California
	Washington 13'; Murray 60'			Stadium: Murdock Stadium; Attendance: 2,705; Referee: José Carlos Ortíz (El Salvador)

May 5 Friendly	United States	1–0	Uruguay	Denver, Colorado
	Vermes 26'			Stadium: Mile High Stadium; Attendance: 35,772; Referee: Antonio Evangelista (Canada)

May 19 Friendly	United States	0–1	Argentina	Palo Alto, California
			Franco 33'	Stadium: Stanford Stadium; Attendance: 31,763; Referee: Robert Sawtell (Canada)

June 1 Friendly	United States	1–1	Republic of Ireland	Foxborough, Massachusetts
	Wynalda 68'		Cascarino 55'	Stadium: Foxboro Stadium; Attendance: 51,273; Referee: Gordon Arrowsmith (Canada)

June 29 Gold Cup GS	United States	2–1	Trinidad and Tobago	Pasadena, California
	Murray 85'; Balboa 87'		Lewis 67'	Stadium: Rose Bowl; Attendance: 18,435; Referee: José Carlos Ortíz (El Salvador)

July 1 Gold Cup GS	United States	3–0	Guatemala	Pasadena, California
	Murray 11'; Quinn 46'; Wynalda 52'			Stadium: Rose Bowl; Attendance: 6,344; Referee: Arlington Success (Antigua and Barbuda)

July 3 Gold Cup GS	United States	3–2	Costa Rica	Los Angeles, California
	Vermes 6'; Pérez 49' (pen.); Marchena 59' (o.g.)	Report	Arguedas 30'; Jara 33'	Stadium: Los Angeles Memorial Coliseum; Attendance: 36,703; Referee: Arturo Brizio Carter (Mexico)

July 5 Gold Cup SF	United States	2–0	Mexico	Los Angeles, California
	Doyle 48'; Vermes 64'			Stadium: Los Angeles Memorial Coliseum; Attendance: 41,103; Referee: José Carlos Ortíz (El Salvador)

July 7 Gold Cup F	United States	0–0 (a.e.t.) (4–3 p)	Honduras	Los Angeles, California
				Stadium: Los Angeles Memorial Coliseum; Attendance: 39,873; Referee: Arturo Brizio Carter (Mexico)
	Penalties
	Balboa (penalty scored); Vermes (penalty missed); Pérez (penalty missed); Caligiuri (penalty scored); Eck (penalty missed); Quinn (penalty missed); Kinnear (penalty scored); Clavijo (penalty scored)		(penalty scored) Castro; (penalty missed) Anariba; (penalty missed) Yearwood; (penalty scored) Flores; (penalty missed) Zapata; (penalty missed) Cálix; (penalty scored) Vallejo; (penalty missed) Espinoza

August 28 Friendly	Romania	0–2	United States	Brașov, Romania
			Balboa 40'; Murray 58'	Stadium: Stadionul Municipal; Attendance: 7,500; Referee: Bernd Heynemann (Germany)

September 4 Friendly	Turkey	1–1	United States	Istanbul, Turkey
	Keser		Klopas 83'	Stadium: Inonu Stadium; Attendance: 17,500; Referee: Zoran Petrović (Yugoslavia)

September 14 Friendly	United States	1–0	Jamaica	High Point, North Carolina
	Gjonbalaj 38'			Stadium: A.J. Simeon Stadium; Attendance: 9,128; Referee: Rex Osborne (Bermuda)

October 19 Friendly	United States	1–2	North Korea	Washington, D.C.
	Murray 25'	Report	Eun 13'; Choi 49'	Stadium: RFK Stadium; Attendance: 16,351; Referee: Derek Douglas (Canada)

November 24 Friendly	United States	1–1	Costa Rica	Irving, Texas
	Kinnear 6'	Report	Montero 59'	Stadium: Texas Stadium; Attendance: 22,787; Referee: Carlos Castellanos (Mexico)

== 1992 ==
Wins	Losses	Draws
6	11	4

Win Draw Loss

January 25 Friendly	United States	0–1	CIS	Miami, Florida
		Report	Tsveiba 67'	Stadium: Joe Robbie Stadium; Attendance: 30,866; Referee: Raúl Domínguez (United States)

February 2 Friendly	United States	2–1	CIS	Pontiac, Michigan
	Wynalda 4'; Balboa 75' (pen.)	Report	Sergeyev 27'	Stadium: Pontiac Silverdome; Attendance: 35,248; Referee: Jack D'Aquila (United States)

February 12 Friendly	Costa Rica	0–0	United States	San José, Costa Rica
				Stadium: Estadio Ricardo Saprissa; Attendance: 22,000; Referee: Rodrigo Badilla (Costa Rica)

February 18 Friendly	El Salvador	2–0	United States	San Salvador, El Salvador
	Castro 18'; Guerrero 65'	Report		Stadium: Estadio Cuscatlán; Attendance: 45,000

February 26 Friendly	Brazil	3–0	United States	Fortaleza, Brazil
	Carlos 26'; Raí 73' (pen.), 79'			Stadium: Estádio Governador Plácido Castelo; Attendance: 40,000; Referee: Luis Villanova (Brazil)

March 11 Friendly	Spain	2–0	United States	Valladolid, Spain
	Begiristain 40'; Hierro 75'			Stadium: Estadio José Zorrilla; Attendance: 15,000; Referee: Martin Rosa dos Santos (Portugal)

March 18 Friendly	Morocco	3–1	United States	Casablanca, Morocco
	Bahja 4'; Rokbi 25'; Chiba 81'	Report	Pérez 58'	Stadium: Mohamed V Stadium; Attendance: 20,000

April 4 Friendly	United States	5–0	China	Palo Alto, California
	Pérez 12', 75'; Wynalda 28', 78'; Kinnear 49'			Stadium: Stanford Stadium; Attendance: 31,815; Referee: José Garza (Mexico)

April 29 Friendly	Republic of Ireland	4–1	United States	Dublin, Ireland
	Townsend 47'; Irwin 52'; Quinn 68'; Cascarino 87'		Wynalda 89'	Stadium: Lansdowne Road; Attendance: 27,000; Referee: Michel Piraux (Belgium)

May 17 Friendly	United States	0–1	Scotland	Denver, Colorado
			Nevin 7'	Stadium: Mile High Stadium; Attendance: 24,157; Referee: Juan Pablo Escobar (Guatemala)

May 30 U.S. Cup	United States	3–1	Republic of Ireland	Washington, D.C.
	Pérez 54'; Balboa 70'; Harkes 87'		McCarthy 51'	Stadium: RFK Stadium; Attendance: 35,696; Referee: Mike Seifert (Canada)

June 3 U.S. Cup	United States	1–0	Portugal	Chicago, Illinois
	Wegerle 35'			Stadium: Soldier Field; Attendance: 10,402; Referee: Angelo Amendolia (Italy)

June 6 U.S. Cup	United States	1–1	Italy	Chicago, Illinois
	Harkes 23'		Baggio 2'	Stadium: Soldier Field; Attendance: 26,874; Referee: Jose Luis Vargas Gonzalez (Costa Rica)

June 13 Friendly	United States	0–1	Australia	Orlando, Florida
			Spink 85'	Stadium: Citrus Bowl; Attendance: 17,400; Referee: Ed Cummings (United States)

June 27 Friendly	United States	0–0	Ukraine	Piscataway, New Jersey
				Stadium: Rutgers Stadium; Attendance: 11,815; Referee: Michael Caulfield (Ireland)

July 31 Amistad Cup	United States	0–1	Colombia	Los Angeles, California
			Valencia 33'	Stadium: Los Angeles Memorial Coliseum; Attendance: 28,651; Referee: José Antonio Garza (Mexico)

August 2 Amistad Cup	United States	0–1	Brazil	Los Angeles, California
			Bebeto 78'	Stadium: Los Angeles Memorial Coliseum; Attendance: 17,021; Referee: Antonio Marrufo (Mexico)

September 3 Friendly	Canada	0–2	United States	Saint John, Canada
			Sorber 26'; Vermes 60'	Stadium: Canada Games Stadium; Attendance: 3,500; Referee: Dino Bucci (Canada)

October 9 Friendly	United States	0–0	Canada	Greensboro, North Carolina
				Stadium: UNCG Soccer Stadium; Attendance: 2,097; Referee: Helder Dias (United States)

October 15 King Fahd Cup SF	Saudi Arabia	3–0	United States	Riyadh, Saudi Arabia
	Al-Bishi 48' (pen.); Al-Thunayan 74'; Al-Muwallid 84'			Stadium: King Fahd Stadium; Attendance: 70,000; Referee: Ulisses Tavares da Silva (Brazil)

October 19 King Fahd Cup 3rd	United States	5–2	Ivory Coast	Riyadh, Saudi Arabia
	Balboa 12'; Jones 31'; Wynalda 56'; Murray 67', 83'		Traoré 16'; Sié 76'	Stadium: King Fahd Stadium; Attendance: 9,500; Referee: Rodrigo Badilla (Costa Rica)

== 1993 ==
Wins	Losses	Draws
10	13	11

Win Draw Loss

January 30 Friendly	United States	2–2	Denmark	Tempe, Arizona
	Murray 59'; Moore 87'		Strudal 29'; Kjeldbjerg 85'	Stadium: Sun Devil Stadium; Attendance: 13,215; Referee: Carlos Castellanos (Mexico)

February 6 Friendly	United States	1–1	Romania	Santa Barbara, California
	Kinnear 2'		Dumitrescu 39'	Stadium: Harder Stadium; Attendance: 9,127; Referee: Arturo Angeles (United States)

February 13 Friendly	United States	0–1	Russia	Orlando, Florida
			Radchenko 11'	Stadium: Citrus Bowl; Attendance: 13,651; Referee: Jack D'Aquilla (United States)

February 21 Friendly	United States	0–0	Russia	Palo Alto, California
				Stadium: Stanford Stadium; Attendance: 25,879; Referee: Brian Hill (United States)

March 3 Friendly	United States	2–2	Canada	Costa Mesa, California
	Kinnear 2'; Murray 64' (pen.)		MacDonald 14'; Catliff 30'	Stadium: LeBard Stadium; Attendance: 5,743; Referee: Helder Dias (United States)

March 10 Kirin Cup	United States	0–0	Hungary	Nagoya, Japan
				Stadium: Mizuho Athletic Stadium; Attendance: 12,500; Referee: Shinichiro Obata (Japan)

March 14 Kirin Cup	Japan	3–1	United States	Tokyo, Japan
	Miura 36', 80'; Lapper 68' (o.g.)		Pérez 23'	Stadium: National Stadium; Attendance: 48,000; Referee: Kim Gwang-taek (South Korea)

March 23 Friendly	El Salvador	2–2	United States	San Salvador, El Salvador
			Allnutt 49'; Jones 53'	Stadium: Estadio Cuscatlán; Attendance: 23,000; Referee: Rafael Rodriguez (El Salvador)

March 25 Friendly	Honduras	4–1	United States	Tegucigalpa, Honduras
			Allnutt 45'	Stadium: Estadio Nacional; Attendance: 24,000; Referee: Armando Castro (Honduras)

April 9 Friendly	Saudi Arabia	0–2	United States	Riyadh, Saudi Arabia
			Moore 79'; Michallik 82'	Stadium: King Fahd Stadium; Attendance: 27,000; Referee: Mohamed Al Sharif Al Yemba (Qatar)

April 17 Friendly	United States	1–1	Iceland	Costa Mesa, California
	Vermes 89'		Stefánsson 25'	Stadium: LeBard Stadium; Attendance: 3,143; Referee: Majid Jay (United States)

May 8 Friendly	United States	1–2	Colombia	Miami, Florida
	Lalas 14'		Valencia 37'; Garcia 68'	Stadium: Orange Bowl; Attendance: 17,652; Referee: Pascual Rebolledo (Mexico)

May 23 Friendly	United States	0–0	Bolivia	Fullerton, California
				Stadium: Titan Stadium; Attendance: 9,578; Referee: Brian Hall (United States)

May 26 Friendly	United States	0–0	Peru	Mission Viejo, California
				Stadium: Trabuco Hills High School; Attendance: 5,500; Referee: Arturo Angeles (United States)

June 6 U.S. Cup	United States	0–2	Brazil	New Haven, Connecticut
			Careca 5'; Winck 87'	Stadium: Yale Bowl; Attendance: 44,579; Referee: Piero Ceccarini (Italy)

June 9 U.S. Cup	United States	2–0	England	Foxborough, Massachusetts
	Dooley 42'; Lalas 72'			Stadium: Foxboro Stadium; Attendance: 37,652; Referee: Alfred Wieser (Austria)

June 13 U.S. Cup	United States	3–4	Germany	Chicago, Illinois
	Dooley 25', 79'; Stewart 72'		Klinsmann 14'; Riedle 34', 39', 59'	Stadium: Soldier Field; Attendance: 53,549; Referee: Juan Carlos Loustau (Argentina)

June 16 Copa América GS	United States	0–1	Uruguay	Ambato, Ecuador
			Ostolaza 51'	Stadium: Estadio Bellavista; Attendance: 22,000; Referee: Alberto Tejada (Peru)

June 19 Copa América GS	Ecuador	2–0	United States	Quito, Ecuador
	Aviles 11'; Hurtado 35'			Stadium: Estadio Olímpico Atahualpa; Attendance: 45,000; Referee: Iván Guerrero (Chile)

June 22 Copa América GS	United States	3–3	Venezuela	Quito, Ecuador
	Henderson 21'; Lalas 37'; Kinnear 52'		Dolgetta 68', 80'; Echenausi 89'	Stadium: Estadio Olímpico Atahualpa; Attendance: 45,000; Referee: Alberto Tejada (Peru)

July 10 Gold Cup GS	United States	1–0	Jamaica	Dallas, Texas
	Wynalda 67'	Report		Stadium: Cotton Bowl; Attendance: 11,642; Referee: Berny Ulloa (Costa Rica)

July 14 Gold Cup GS	United States	2–1	Panama	Dallas, Texas
	Wynalda 68'; Dooley 73'		Piggott 31'	Stadium: Cotton Bowl; Attendance: 13,771; Referee: Roberto Parisius (Suriname)

July 17 Gold Cup GS	United States	1–0	Honduras	Dallas, Texas
	Lalas 29'			Stadium: Cotton Bowl; Attendance: 18,527; Referee: Robert Sawtell (Canada)

July 21 Gold Cup SF	United States	1–0 (a.e.t.)	Costa Rica	Dallas, Texas
	Kooiman 103'	Report		Stadium: Cotton Bowl; Attendance: 14,826; Referee: Ramesh Ramdhan (Trinidad and Tobago)

July 25 Gold Cup F	Mexico	4–0	United States	Mexico City, Mexico
	Ambríz 11'; Armstrong 31' (o.g.); Zague 69'; Cantú 79'			Stadium: Estadio Azteca; Attendance: 120,000; Referee: Robert Sawtell (Canada)

August 31 Friendly	Iceland	0–1	United States	Reykjavík, Iceland
			Stewart 87'	Stadium: Laugardalsvollur; Attendance: 3,700; Referee: David Elleray (England)

September 8 Friendly	Norway	1–0	United States	Oslo, Norway
	Bjørnebye 13'			Stadium: Ullevaal Stadion; Attendance: 16,348; Referee: Michel Zen-Ruffinen (Switzerland)

October 13 Friendly	United States	1–1	Mexico	Washington, D.C.
	Jones 82'		del Olmo 62'	Stadium: RFK Stadium; Attendance: 23,927; Referee: Berny Ulloa Morera (Costa Rica)

October 16 Friendly	United States	1–2	Ukraine	High Point, North Carolina
	Pérez 26'		Leonenko 41', 43'	Stadium: A.J. Simeon Stadium; Attendance: 4,298; Referee: Helder Dias (United States)

October 23 Friendly	United States	0–1	Ukraine	Bethlehem, Pennsylvania
			Popov 36'	Stadium: Goodman Stadium; Attendance: 7,896; Referee: Jack D`Aquila (United States)

November 7 Friendly	United States	1–0	Jamaica	Fullerton, California
	Lalas 32'			Stadium: Titan Stadium; Attendance: 5,318; Referee: Jack D`Aquila (United States)

November 14 Friendly	United States	8–1	Cayman Islands	Mission Viejo, California
	Kinnear 9', 30'; Moore 19', 88'; Agoos 33'; Chung 46', 85'; Santel 87'		Ramoon 67'	Stadium: Trabuco Hills High School; Attendance: 3,612; Referee: Esfandiar Baharmast (United States)

December 5 Friendly	United States	7–0	El Salvador	Los Angeles, California
	Kinnear 28', 43'; Moore 35', 42', 65', 70'; Pérez 67'			Stadium: Los Angeles Memorial Coliseum; Attendance: 7,618; Referee: Carlos Castellanos (Mexico)

December 18 Friendly	United States	0–3	Germany	Palo Alto, California
			Moller 16'; Kuntz 79'; Thom 89'	Stadium: Stanford Stadium; Attendance: 52,397; Referee: Rune Pedersen (Norway)

== 1994 ==
Wins	Losses	Draws
7	9	11

Win Draw Loss

January 15 Friendly	United States	2–1	Norway	Tempe, Arizona
	Balboa 55'; Jones 89'		Strandli 45'	Stadium: Sun Devil Stadium; Attendance: 15,386; Referee: Miguel Angel Salas (Mexico)

January 22 Friendly	United States	1–1	Switzerland	Fullerton, California
	Egli 88' (o.g.)		Fournier 64'	Stadium: Titan Stadium; Attendance: 10,173; Referee: Rodrigo Badilla (Costa Rica)

January 29 Friendly	United States	1–1	Russia	Seattle, Washington
	Lalas 85'		Radchenko 52'	Stadium: Kingdome; Attendance: 43,651; Referee: Bob Satwell (Canada)

February 10 Carlsberg Cup SF	United States	0–0 (2–4 p)	Denmark	Hong Kong
				Stadium: Mong Kok Stadium; Attendance: 8,600; Referee: Cheung Kai-Ming (Hong Kong)

February 13 Carlsberg Cup 3rd	United States	1–2	Romania	Hong Kong
	Balboa 14'		Dumitrescu 7', 82'	Stadium: Mong Kok Stadium; Attendance: 9,000; Referee: Pang Cham Kai (Hong Kong)

February 18 Joe Robbie Cup	United States	1–1	Bolivia	Miami, Florida
	Jones 78'		Moreno 44'	Stadium: Joe Robbie Stadium; Attendance: 15,676; Referee: Alcala Pineda (Mexico)

February 20 Joe Robbie Cup	United States	1–3	Sweden	Miami, Florida
	Pérez 4'		Larsson 30'; Andersson 34'; Lilienberg 56'	Stadium: Joe Robbie Stadium; Attendance: 20,171; Referee: Marrufo Mendoza (Mexico)

March 12 Friendly	United States	1–1	South Korea	Fullerton, California
	Balboa 64'		Armstrong 31' (o.g.)	Stadium: Titan Stadium; Attendance: 10,319; Referee: Rene Parra (Canada)

March 26 Friendly	United States	2–2	Bolivia	Dallas, Texas
	Pérez 31' (pen.), 48'	Report	Baldivieso 12'; Pinedo 76'	Stadium: Cotton Bowl; Attendance: 26,835; Referee: Hugh Dallas (Scotland)

April 16 Friendly	United States	1–1	Moldova	Jacksonville, Florida
	Sorber 47'		Kosse 85' (pen.)	Stadium: Wolfson Park; Attendance: 6,103; Referee: Joshua Pattlak (United States)

April 20 Friendly	United States	3–0	Moldova	Davidson, North Carolina
	Klopas 3'; Lapper 40'; Reyna 59'			Stadium: Richardson Stadium; Attendance: 4,790; Referee: Zimmerman Boulos (United States)

April 24 Friendly	United States	1–2	Iceland	Chula Vista, California
	Klopas 47'		Sigurdsson 20'; Gunnlaugsson 86'	Stadium: DeVore Stadium; Attendance: 3,017; Referee: Joshua Patlak (United States)

April 30 Friendly	United States	0–2	Chile	Albuquerque, New Mexico
			Barrera 45'; González 89'	Stadium: University Stadium; Attendance: 15,610; Referee: Raúl Gutiérrez (Costa Rica)

May 7 Friendly	United States	4–0	Estonia	Fullerton, California
	Klopas 36'; Reyna 41'; Balboa 76'; Moore 87'			Stadium: Titan Stadium; Attendance: 2,158; Referee: Joshua Patlak (United States)

May 15 Friendly	United States	1–0	Armenia	Fullerton, California
	Klopas 64'			Stadium: Titan Stadium; Attendance: 9,753; Referee: Brian Hall (United States)

May 25 Friendly	United States	0–0	Saudi Arabia	Piscataway, New Jersey
				Stadium: Rutgers Stadium; Attendance: 5,576; Referee: Jose Emiliano Ramirez Suazo (Honduras)

May 28 Friendly	United States	1–1	Greece	New Haven, Connecticut
	Klopas 45'		Hantzidis 49'	Stadium: Yale Bowl; Attendance: 21,317; Referee: Benito Archundia (Mexico)

June 4 Friendly	United States	1–0	Mexico	Pasadena, California
	Wegerle 51'			Stadium: Rose Bowl; Attendance: 91,123; Referee: Berny Ulloa Morera (Costa Rica)

June 18 World Cup GS	United States	1–1	Switzerland	Pontiac, Michigan
	Wynalda 44'		Bregy 39'	Stadium: Pontiac Silverdome; Attendance: 73,425; Referee: Francisco Oscar Lamolina (Argentina)

June 22 World Cup GS	United States	2–1	Colombia	Pasadena, California
	Escobar 35' (o.g.); Stewart 52'		Valencia 90'	Stadium: Rose Bowl; Attendance: 93,869; Referee: Fabio Baldas (Italy)

June 26 World Cup GS	United States	0–1	Romania	Pasadena, California
			Petrescu 18'	Stadium: Rose Bowl; Attendance: 93,869; Referee: Mario van der Ende (Netherlands)

July 4 World Cup R16	United States	0–1	Brazil	Palo Alto, California
	Clavijo (yellow card) 64' (yellow-red card) 85'		Leonardo (red card) 43'; Bebeto 72'	Stadium: Stanford Stadium; Attendance: 84,147; Referee: Joël Quiniou (France)

September 7 Friendly	England	2–0	United States	London, England
	Shearer 33', 40'			Stadium: Wembley Stadium; Attendance: 38,629; Referee: Antonio López Nieto (Spain)

October 19 Friendly	Saudi Arabia	2–1	United States	Dammam, Saudi Arabia
	Al-Jaber 54'; Al-Ghayshiyan 90'		Klopas 58' (pen.)	Stadium: Prince Mohamed bin Fahd Stadium; Attendance: 9,256; Referee: Jamal Al Sharif (Syria)

November 19 Friendly	Trinidad and Tobago	1–0	United States	Port of Spain, Trinidad and Tobago
	Lewis 41'			Stadium: National Stadium; Attendance: 22,000; Referee: Ramesh Ramdhan (Trinidad and Tobago)

November 22 Friendly	Jamaica	0–3	United States	Kingston, Jamaica
		Report	Kirovski 25'; Klopas 52', 62' (pen.)	Stadium: Independence Park; Attendance: 30,199

December 11 Friendly	United States	1–1	Honduras	Fullerton, California
	Kirovski 90'		Velázquez 68'	Stadium: Titan Stadium; Attendance: 1,094; Referee: Arturo Angeles (United States)

== 1995 ==
Wins	Losses	Draws
5	6	3

Win Draw Loss

March 25 Friendly	United States	2–2	Uruguay	Dallas, Texas
	Kerr, Jr. 9'; Stewart 67'		Otero 75'; Poyet 83'	Stadium: Cotton Bowl; Attendance: 12,242; Referee: Antonio Marrufo (Mexico)

April 22 Friendly	Belgium	1–0	United States	Molenbeek-Saint-Jean, Belgium
	Schepens 44'			Stadium: Edmond Machtens Stadium; Attendance: 14,000; Referee: Michel Zen-Ruffinen (Switzerland)

May 28 Friendly	United States	1–2	Costa Rica	Tampa, Florida
	Caligiuri 73'		Ilama 20'; Soto 89'	Stadium: Tampa Stadium; Attendance: 7,415; Referee: Zimmermann Boulos (United States)

June 11 U.S. Cup	United States	3–2	Nigeria	Foxborough, Massachusetts
	Harkes 11'; Balboa 45+1'; Jones 68'		Okocha 9'; Taiwo 20'	Stadium: Foxboro Stadium; Attendance: 22,578

June 18 U.S. Cup	United States	4–0	Mexico	Washington, D.C.
	Wegerle 3'; Dooley 25'; Harkes 36'; Reyna 67'			Stadium: RFK Stadium; Attendance: 38,615

June 25 U.S. Cup	United States	0–0	Colombia	Piscataway, New Jersey
				Stadium: Rutgers Stadium; Attendance: 36,126; Referee: Rafael Rodriguez Medina (El Salvador)

July 8 Copa América GS	United States	2–1	Chile	Paysandú, Uruguay
	Wynalda 14', 20'		Rozental 63'	Stadium: Estadio Parque Artigas; Attendance: 16,000; Referee: Alberto Tejada (Peru)

July 11 Copa América GS	United States	0–1	Bolivia	Paysandú, Uruguay
			Etcheverry 23'	Stadium: Estadio Parque Artigas; Attendance: 16,000; Referee: Paolo Borgosano (Venezuela)

July 14 Copa América GS	United States	3–0	Argentina	Paysandú, Uruguay
	Klopas 20'; Lalas 31'; Wynalda 58'			Stadium: Estadio Parque Artigas; Attendance: 8,000; Referee: Márcio Rezende (Brazil)

July 17 Copa América QF	United States	0–0 (a.e.t.) (4–1 p)	Mexico	Paysandú, Uruguay
				Stadium: Estadio Parque Artigas; Attendance: 6,500; Referee: Óscar Ruiz (Colombia)
	Penalties
	Wynalda (penalty scored); Moore (penalty scored); Caligiuri (penalty scored); Klopas (penalty scored)		(penalty scored) García; (penalty missed) Arroyo; (penalty missed) Coyote

July 20 Copa América SF	United States	0–1	Brazil	Maldonado, Uruguay
			Aldair 13'	Stadium: Estadio Campus Municipal; Attendance: 8,000; Referee: Alfredo Rodas (Ecuador)

July 22 Copa América 3rd	United States	1–4	Colombia	Maldonado, Uruguay
	Moore 52' (pen.)		Quiñónez 30'; Valderrama 38'; Asprilla 50'; Rincón 76'	Stadium: Estadio Campus Municipal; Attendance: 2,500; Referee: Salvador Imperatore (Chile)

August 16 Friendly	Sweden	1–0	United States	Norrköping, Sweden
	Brolin 85' (pen.)			Stadium: Nya Parken; Attendance: 14,249; Referee: Roy Helge Olsen (Norway)

October 8 Friendly	United States	4–3	Saudi Arabia	Washington, D.C.
	Lalas 35'; Moore 48'; Ramos 62'; Lassiter 66'		Al-Jaber 7'; Al-Mehalel 10'; Al-Owairan 28'	Stadium: RFK Stadium; Attendance: 10,216; Referee: Raul Dominguez (United States)

== 1996 ==
Wins	Losses	Draws
10	4	2

Win Draw Loss

January 13 Gold Cup GS	United States	3–2	Trinidad and Tobago	Anaheim, California
	Wynalda 15', 34'; Moore 53'		Dwarika 6', 43'	Stadium: Anaheim Stadium; Attendance: 12,425; Referee: Argelio Sabillon (Honduras)

January 16 Gold Cup GS	United States	2–0	El Salvador	Anaheim, California
	Wynalda 63'; Balboa 75'			Stadium: Anaheim Stadium; Attendance: 52,345; Referee: Ramesh Ramdhan (Trinidad and Tobago)

January 18 Gold Cup SF	United States	0–1	Brazil	Los Angeles, California
			Balboa 79' (o.g.)	Stadium: Los Angeles Memorial Coliseum; Attendance: 20,708; Referee: Benito Archundia (Mexico)

January 21 Gold Cup 3rd	United States	3–0	Guatemala	Los Angeles, California
	Wynalda 34'; Agoos 37'; Kirovski 87'			Stadium: Los Angeles Memorial Coliseum; Attendance: 88,155; Referee: René Parra (Canada)

May 26 Friendly	United States	2–1	Scotland	New Britain, Connecticut
	Wynalda 13' (pen.); Jones 72'		Durie 9'	Stadium: Veterans Stadium; Attendance: 8,526; Referee: Arturo Brizo Carter (Mexico)

June 9 U.S. Cup	United States	2–1	Republic of Ireland	Foxborough, Massachusetts
	Ramos 58'; Reyna 76'		Connolly 57'	Stadium: Foxboro Stadium; Attendance: 25,332; Referee: Peter Prendergast (Jamaica)

June 12 U.S. Cup	United States	0–2	Bolivia	Washington, D.C.
			Moreno 2'; Coimbra 88'	Stadium: RFK Stadium; Attendance: 19,350; Referee: Dino Bucci (Canada)

June 16 U.S. Cup	United States	2–2	Mexico	Pasadena, California
	Wynalda 34'; Dooley 90'		García 45'; Blanco 89'	Stadium: Rose Bowl; Attendance: 92,216

August 30 Friendly	United States	3–1	El Salvador	Los Angeles, California
	Moore 3', 88' (pen.); Wynalda 61'		Lazo 61'	Stadium: Los Angeles Memorial Coliseum; Attendance: 18,861; Referee: Joshua Patlak (United States)

October 16 Friendly	Peru	4–1	United States	Lima, Peru
	Palacios 33'; Olivares 68'; Maldonado 73'; Solano 83'		Brose 43'	Stadium: Estadio Nacional de Lima; Attendance: 8,019; Referee: Juan Luna (Bolivia)

November 3 WCQ R3	United States	2–0	Guatemala	Washington, D.C.
	Wynalda 54'; McBride 90'			Stadium: RFK Stadium; Attendance: 30,082; Referee: Charles Barrett (Jamaica)

November 10 WCQ R3	United States	2–0	Trinidad and Tobago	Richmond, Virginia
	Dooley 52'; Wynalda 85'			Stadium: University of Richmond Stadium; Attendance: 19,312; Referee: Arturo Brizio Carter (Mexico)

November 24 WCQ R3	Trinidad and Tobago	0–1	United States	Port of Spain, Trinidad and Tobago
			Moore 36'	Stadium: National Stadium; Attendance: 4,000; Referee: Mark Forde (Barbados)

December 1 WCQ R3	Costa Rica	2–1	United States	San José, Costa Rica
	Wanchope 39'; López 84'		Jones 90'	Stadium: Estadio Ricardo Saprissa; Attendance: 18,000; Referee: Peter Prendergast (Jamaica)

December 14 WCQ R3	United States	2–1	Costa Rica	Palo Alto, California
	McBride 16'; Lassiter 60'		Gómez 74'	Stadium: Stanford Stadium; Attendance: 40,527; Referee: León Padro Borja (Mexico)

December 21 WCQ R3	Guatemala	2–2	United States	San Salvador, El Salvador
	Funes 9'; Plata 44'		Preki 7'; Hejduk 48'	Stadium: Estadio Cuscatlán; Attendance: 7,106; Referee: Mike Seifert (Canada)

== 1997 ==
Wins	Losses	Draws
5	6	7

Win Draw Loss

January 17 U.S. Cup	United States	0–1	Peru	San Diego, California
			Carty 8'	Stadium: Jack Murphy Stadium; Attendance: 35,232; Referee: Arturo Brizio Carter (Mexico)

January 19 U.S. Cup	United States	0–2	Mexico	Pasadena, California
			Alves 3'; García Aspe 71'	Stadium: Rose Bowl; Attendance: 31,725; Referee: Kevin Skinner (Canada)

January 22 U.S. Cup	United States	1–4	Denmark	Pasadena, California
	Moore 45'		Pedersen 16', 26', 45', 55'	Stadium: Rose Bowl; Attendance: 17,342

January 29 Friendly	China	2–1	United States	Kunming, China
	Hao 11'; Li 31'		Wynalda 72'	Stadium: Tuodong Stadium; Attendance: 40,000; Referee: Jun Lu (China)

February 2 Friendly	China	1–1	United States	Guangzhou, China
	Su 32'		Lalas 25'	Stadium: Tianhe Stadium; Attendance: 45,000; Referee: Li Shao Feng (China)

March 2 WCQ R4	Jamaica	0–0	United States	Kingston, Jamaica
				Stadium: Independence Park; Attendance: 35,246; Referee: Jose Ramirez Suazo (Honduras)

March 16 WCQ R4	United States	3–0	Canada	Stanford, California
	Wynalda 7' (pen.); Pope 14'; Stewart 89'			Stadium: Stanford Stadium; Attendance: 28,896; Referee: Luis Oliveto (Argentina)

March 23 WCQ R4	Costa Rica	3–2	United States	San José, Costa Rica
	Medford 10'; Solís 32'; Gómez 76'		Wynalda 25'; Lassiter 67'	Stadium: Estadio Ricardo Saprissa; Attendance: 22,000; Referee: Mario Escobar (Guatemala)

April 20 WCQ R4	United States	2–2	Mexico	Foxborough, Massachusetts
	Pope 35'; Ramírez 74' (o.g.)		Hermosillo 1'; Hernández 54'	Stadium: Foxboro Stadium; Attendance: 57,877; Referee: Ubaldo Aquino (Paraguay)

June 4 Friendly	United States	0–0	Paraguay	Fenton, Missouri
				Stadium: Anheuser-Busch Center; Attendance: 7,016; Referee: Esfandiar Baharmast (United States)

June 17 Friendly	United States	2–1	Israel	Jacksonville, Florida
	Lalas 26'; Kirovski 68'		Glam 83'	Stadium: Alltel Stadium; Attendance: 8,436; Referee: Zimmermann Boulos (United States)

June 29 WCQ R4	El Salvador	1–1	United States	San Salvador, El Salvador
	Díaz Arce 60'		Lassiter 57'	Stadium: Estadio Cuscatlán; Attendance: 29,000; Referee: René Ortubé (Bolivia)

August 7 Friendly	United States	0–1	Ecuador	Baltimore, Maryland
			Sánchez 83'	Stadium: Memorial Stadium; Attendance: 13,629; Referee: Raul Dominguez (United States)

September 7 WCQ R4	United States	1–0	Costa Rica	Portland, Oregon
	Ramos 79'			Stadium: Civic Stadium; Attendance: 27,396; Referee: Jorge Luis Nieves (Uruguay)

October 3 WCQ R4	United States	1–1	Jamaica	Washington, D.C.
	Wynalda 50' (pen.)		Burton 51'	Stadium: RFK Stadium; Attendance: 51,528; Referee: Mario Sánchez (Chile)

November 2 WCQ R4	Mexico	0–0	United States	Mexico City, Mexico
				Stadium: Estadio Azteca; Attendance: 115,000; Referee: Javier Castrilli (Argentina)

November 9 WCQ R4	Canada	0–3	United States	Burnaby, Canada
			Reyna 5'; Wegerle 81', 90+4'	Stadium: Swangard Stadium; Attendance: 8,420; Referee: John Toro Rendón (Colombia)

November 16 WCQ R4	United States	4–2	El Salvador	Foxborough, Massachusetts
	McBride 22', 28'; Henderson 49'; Preki 82'		Nildeson 60'; Díaz Arce 62' (pen.)	Stadium: Foxboro Stadium; Attendance: 53,193; Referee: Pierluigi Collina (Italy)

== 1998 ==
Wins	Losses	Draws
6	6	4

Win Draw Loss

January 24 Friendly	United States	1–0	Sweden	Orlando, Florida
	Wegerle 2'			Stadium: Citrus Bowl; Attendance: 12,773; Referee: Richard Grady (United States)

February 1 Gold Cup GS	United States	3–0	Cuba	Oakland, California
	Wegerle 55'; Wynalda 58'; Moore 76' (pen.)			Stadium: Oakland–Alameda County Coliseum; Attendance: 11,234; Referee: Mourad Daami (Tunisia)

February 7 Gold Cup GS	United States	2–1	Costa Rica	Oakland, California
	Pope 7'; Preki 78'		Oviedo 56'	Stadium: Oakland–Alameda County Coliseum; Attendance: 36,240; Referee: Mohammed Nazri (Malaysia)

February 10 Gold Cup SF	United States	1–0	Brazil	Los Angeles, California
	Preki 65'			Stadium: Los Angeles Memorial Coliseum; Attendance: 12,298; Referee: Ali Bujsaim (United Arab Emirates)

February 15 Gold Cup F	United States	0–1	Mexico	Los Angeles, California
			Hernández 43'	Stadium: Los Angeles Memorial Coliseum; Attendance: 91,255; Referee: Ramesh Ramdhan (Trinidad and Tobago)

February 21 Friendly	United States	0–2	Netherlands	Miami, Florida
			de Boer 1'; Seedorf 46'	Stadium: Orange Bowl; Attendance: 20,379; Referee: Benito Archundia (Mexico)

February 25 Friendly	Belgium	2–0	United States	Brussels, Belgium
	Van Kerckhoven 23', 59'			Stadium: Koning Boudewijnstadion; Attendance: 15,894; Referee: Philippe Kart (France)

March 14 Friendly	United States	2–2	Paraguay	San Diego, California
	Deering 21'; Balboa 50'		Caniza 15'; Arce 75' (pen.)	Stadium: Qualcomm Stadium; Attendance: 15,253; Referee: Luis Padro Borja (Mexico)

April 22 Friendly	Austria	0–3	United States	Vienna, Austria
			Hejduk 54'; McBride 89'; Reyna 90+3'	Stadium: Ernst-Happel-Stadion; Attendance: 17,000; Referee: Attila Hanacsek (Hungary)

May 16 Friendly	United States	0–0	Macedonia	San Jose, California
				Stadium: Spartan Stadium; Attendance: 23,861; Referee: Rónald Cedeño (Costa Rica)

May 24 Friendly	United States	2–0	Kuwait	Portland, Oregon
	Stewart 37'; Ramos 82'			Stadium: Civic Stadium; Attendance: 25,343; Referee: Mario Ramírez (Guatemala)

May 30 Friendly	United States	0–0	Scotland	Washington, D.C.
				Stadium: RFK Stadium; Attendance: 46,037; Referee: Felipe Ramos Rizo (Mexico)

June 15 World Cup GS	United States	0–2	Germany	Paris, France
21:00 UTC+01			Möller 9'; Klinsmann 65'	Stadium: Parc des Princes; Attendance: 45,500; Referee: Said Belqola (Morocco)

June 21 World Cup GS	United States	1–2	Iran	Lyon, France
21:00 UTC+01	McBride 87'		Estili 40'; Mahdavikia 84'	Stadium: Stade de Gerland; Attendance: 39,100; Referee: Urs Meier (Switzerland)

June 25 World Cup GS	United States	0–1	FR Yugoslavia	Nantes, France
21:00 UTC+01			Komljenović 4'	Stadium: Stade de la Beaujoire; Attendance: 35,500; Referee: Gamal Al-Ghandour (Egypt)

November 11 Friendly	United States	0–0	Australia	San Jose, California
				Stadium: Spartan Stadium; Attendance: 15,074; Referee: Mike Seifert (Canada)

== 1999 ==
Wins	Losses	Draws
7	4	2

Win Draw Loss

January 24 Friendly	Bolivia	0–0	United States	Santa Cruz de la Sierra, Bolivia
				Stadium: Estadio Ramón Aguilera; Attendance: 39,000; Referee: Juan Carlos Paniagua (Bolivia)

February 6 Friendly	United States	3–0	Germany	Jacksonville, Florida
	Kirovski 16'; Sanneh 24'; Reyna 26'			Stadium: Alltel Stadium; Attendance: 17,259; Referee: Gilberto Alcalá (Mexico)

February 21 Friendly	United States	2–1	Chile	Fort Lauderdale, Florida
	Olsen 58'; Lewis 65'		Cartes 64'	Stadium: Lockhart Stadium; Attendance: 14,896; Referee: Pascal Rebolledo (Mexico)

March 11 U.S. Cup	United States	3–1	Guatemala	Los Angeles, California
	Moore 22'; McBride 37'; Hejduk 90+4'		Perez 51' (pen.)	Stadium: Los Angeles Memorial Coliseum; Attendance: 34,154; Referee: José Robles (Mexico)

March 13 U.S. Cup	United States	1–2	Mexico	San Diego, California
	Hejduk 51'		Fraser 14' (o.g.); Abundis 57'	Stadium: Qualcomm Stadium; Attendance: 50,324; Referee: René Parra (Canada)

June 13 Friendly	United States	1–0	Argentina	Washington, D.C.
	Moore 88'			Stadium: RFK Stadium; Attendance: 40,119; Referee: Rodrigo Badilla (Costa Rica)

July 24 Confederations Cup GS	United States	2–1	New Zealand	Guadalajara, Mexico
	McBride 25'; Kirovski 58'		Zoricich 90+3'	Stadium: Estadio Jalisco; Attendance: 60,000; Referee: Ubaldo Aquino (Paraguay)

July 28 Confederations Cup GS	United States	0–1	Brazil	Guadalajara, Mexico
			Ronaldinho 13'	Stadium: Estadio Jalisco; Attendance: 54,000; Referee: Anders Frisk (Sweden)

July 30 Confederations Cup GS	United States	2–0	Germany	Guadalajara, Mexico
	Olsen 23'; Moore 50'			Stadium: Estadio Jalisco; Attendance: 53,000; Referee: Gilberto Alcalá (Mexico)

August 1 Confederations Cup SF	Mexico	1–0 (a.e.t.)	United States	Mexico City, Mexico
	Blanco 97'			Stadium: Estadio Azteca; Attendance: 82,000; Referee: Kim Young-joo (South Korea)

August 3 Confederations Cup 3rd	United States	2–0	Saudi Arabia	Guadalajara, Mexico
	Bravo 27'; McKeon (yellow card) 55' (yellow-red card) 63'; McBride 78'			Stadium: Estadio Jalisco; Attendance: 38,000; Referee: Ubaldo Aquino (Paraguay)

September 8 Friendly	Jamaica	2–2	United States	Kingston, Jamaica
	Davis 14' (pen.); Johnson 79'		Kreis 5'; Albright 80'	Stadium: Independence Park; Attendance: 20,000; Referee: Godfrey Bowen (Cayman Islands)

November 11 Friendly	Morocco	2–1	United States	Marrakesh, Morocco
	Ramzi 15'; Hadji 27' (pen.)	Report	Wynalda 17'	Stadium: Stade El Harti; Attendance: 18,000; Referee: Gamal El Ghandour (Egypt)

== See also ==
- 1990 Croatia v United States soccer match
- United States at the FIFA World Cup
- United States at the FIFA Confederations Cup
- United States at the CONCACAF Gold Cup
- United States at the Copa América
