= 1997 in American soccer =

Soccer in the United States
- Season: 1997

The 1997 season was the 85th year of competitive soccer in the United States.

== National team ==
=== Record ===
Competition	GP	W	D	L	GF	GA
1998 FIFA World Cup qualification	10	4	5	1	17	9
1997 U.S. Cup	3	0	0	3	1	7
International Friendly	5	1	2	2	4	5
Total	18	5	7	6	22	21

=== Results ===
The home team or the team that is designated as the home team is listed in the left column; the away team is

in the right column.

Win Draw Loss

January 17 U.S. Cup	United States	0 – 1	Peru	San Diego, California
			Carty 8'	Stadium: Jack Murphy Stadium; Attendance: 35,232; Referee: Arturo Brizio Carter (Mexico)

January 19 U.S. Cup	United States	0 – 2	Mexico	Pasadena, California
			Alves 3'; Aspe 71'	Stadium: Rose Bowl; Attendance: 31,725; Referee: Kevin Skinner (Canada)

January 22 U.S. Cup	United States	1 – 4	Denmark	Pasadena, California
	Moore 45'		Pedersen 16', 26', 45', 55'	Stadium: Rose Bowl; Attendance: 17,342

January 29 International Friendly	China	2 – 1	United States	Kunming, China
	Haidong 11'; Tie 31'		Wynalda 72'	Stadium: Tuodong Stadiuml; Attendance: 40,000; Referee: Jun Lu (China)

February 2 International Friendly	China	1 – 1	United States	Guangzhou, China
	Maozhen 32'		Lalas 25'	Stadium: Tianhe Stadium; Attendance: 45,000

March 2 World Cup qualifying	Jamaica	0 – 0	United States	Kingston, Jamaica
				Stadium: National Stadium; Attendance: 35,246; Referee: José Ramírez Suazo (Honduras)

March 16 World Cup qualifying	United States	3 – 0	Canada	Stanford, California
	Wynalda 7' (pen.); Pope 14'; Stewart 89'			Stadium: Stanford Stadium; Attendance: 28,896; Referee: Luis Oliveto (Argentina)

March 23 World Cup qualifying	Costa Rica	3 – 2	United States	San José, Costa Rica
	Medford 10'; Solís 32'; Gómez 76'		Wynalda 25'; Lassiter 67'	Stadium: Estadio Ricardo Saprissa; Attendance: 22,000; Referee: Mario Escobar (Guatemala)

April 20 World Cup qualifying	United States	2 – 2	Mexico	Foxborough, Massachusetts
	Pope 34'; Ramírez 76' (o.g.)		Hermosillo 1'; Hernández 53'	Stadium: Foxboro Stadium; Attendance: 57,877; Referee: Ubaldo Aquino (Paraguay)

June 4 International Friendly	United States	0 – 0	Paraguay	Fenton, Missouri
				Stadium: Anheuser-Busch Center; Attendance: 7,016; Referee: Esfandiar Baharmast (United States)

June 17 International Friendly	United States	2 – 1	Israel	Jacksonville, Florida
	Lalas 26'; Kirovski 68'		Glam 83'	Stadium: Alltel Stadium; Attendance: 8,436; Referee: Zimmermann Boulos (United States)

June 29 World Cup qualifying	El Salvador	1 – 1	United States	San Salvador, El Salvador
	Arce 60'		Lassiter 57'	Stadium: Estadio Cuscatlán; Attendance: 29,000; Referee: René Ortube Betancourt (Bolivia)

August 7 International Friendly	United States	0 – 1	Ecuador	Baltimore, Maryland
			Sánchez 83'	Stadium: Memorial Stadium; Attendance: 13,629

September 7 World Cup qualifying	United States	1 – 0	Costa Rica	Portland, Oregon
	Ramos 79'			Stadium: Civic Stadium; Attendance: 27,396; Referee: Oscar Juan Ruiz Acosta (Colombia)

October 5 World Cup qualifying	United States	1 – 1	Jamaica	Washington, D.C.
	Wynalda 50' (pen.)		Burton 51'	Stadium: RFK Stadium; Attendance: 51,528; Referee: Mario Sánchez (Chile)

November 2 World Cup qualifying	Mexico	0 – 0	United States	Mexico City, Mexico
				Stadium: Estadio Azteca; Attendance: 115,000; Referee: Javier Castrilli (Argentina)

November 11 World Cup qualifying	Canada	0 – 3	United States	Burnaby, Canada
			Reyna 5'; Wegerle 81', 90+4'	Stadium: Swangard Stadium; Attendance: 8,420; Referee: John Jairo Toro (Colombia)

November 16 World Cup qualifying	United States	4 – 2	El Salvador	Foxborough, Massachusetts
	McBride 22', 28'; Henderson 49'; Preki 82'		Nildeson 60'; Arce 62' (pen.)	Stadium: Foxboro Stadium; Attendance: 53,193; Referee: Pierluigi Collina (Italy)

=== Goalscorers ===
Player	Goals
Eric Wynalda	4
Alexi Lalas	2
Brian McBride	2
Eddie Pope	2
Roy Lassiter	2
Roy Wegerle	2
Preki	1
Joe-Max Moore	1
Jovan Kirovski	1
Chris Henderson	1
Claudio Reyna	1
Ernie Stewart	1
Tab Ramos	1

==== Unofficial Results ====
The home team or the team that is designated as the home team is listed in the left column; the away team is in the right column.

Win Draw Loss

July 10 Friendly Game	United States	1 – 4	(Turkey) Galatasaray	New Jersey
		report		Attendance: 0

== League tables ==
=== Men ===
==== Major League Soccer ====
Pos	Team	Pld	W	SOW	L	GF	GA	GD	Pts	Qualification
1	D.C. United	32	17	4	11	70	53	+17	55	MLS Cup Playoffs
2	Tampa Bay Mutiny	32	14	3	15	55	60	−5	45	MLS Cup Playoffs
3	Columbus Crew	32	12	3	17	42	41	+1	39	MLS Cup Playoffs
4	New England Revolution	32	11	4	17	40	53	−13	37	MLS Cup Playoffs
5	NY/NJ MetroStars	32	11	2	19	43	53	−10	35	

Source: MLS

Pos	Team	Pld	W	SOW	L	GF	GA	GD	Pts	Qualification
1	Kansas City Wizards	32	14	7	11	57	51	+6	49	MLS Cup Playoffs
2	Los Angeles Galaxy	32	14	2	16	55	44	+11	44	MLS Cup Playoffs
3	Dallas Burn	32	13	3	16	55	49	+6	42	MLS Cup Playoffs
4	Colorado Rapids	32	12	2	18	50	59	−9	38	MLS Cup Playoffs
5	San Jose Clash	32	9	3	20	55	59	−4	30	

Source: MLS

Playoffs

Conference Semifinals
1	D.C. United (AET), (4-3, S.O.)*	4	2*	x
4	New England Revolution	1	1	x
Eastern Conference
2	Tampa Bay Mutiny	1	0	x
3	Columbus Crew	2	2	x
1	Kansas City Wizards	0	2	x
4	Colorado Rapids	3	3	x
Western Conference
3	Los Angeles Galaxy	0	0	x
2	Dallas Burn (AET), (2-0, S.O.)*	1*	3	x

Conference Finals
1	D.C. United	3	1	x
3	Columbus Crew	2	0	x
4	Colorado Rapids	1	2	x
2	Dallas Burn	0	1	x

MLS Cup '97
E	D.C. United	2
W	Colorado Rapids	1

- Best of Three series winners will advance.

MLS Cup

October 26

D.C. United	2 – 1	Colorado Rapids
Moreno 37'; Sanneh 68'		Paz 75'

RFK Stadium, Washington, D.C.
Attendance: 57,431
Referee: Brian Hall

==== A-League ====
Northeast Division

Pos	Team	Pld	W	SW	SL	L	GF	GA	GD	Pts
1	Montreal Impact	28	20	1	1	6	58	19	+39	61
2	Rochester Raging Rhinos	28	14	0	5	9	56	47	+9	42
3	Long Island Rough Riders	28	13	3	2	10	44	36	+8	42
4	Toronto Lynx	28	12	2	0	14	44	43	+1	38
5	Connecticut Wolves	28	8	4	1	15	31	45	−14	28
6	Worcester Wildfire	28	6	1	2	19	26	61	−35	19

Atlantic Division

Pos	Team	Pld	W	SW	SL	L	GF	GA	GD	Pts
1	Hershey Wildcats	28	18	1	1	8	56	33	+23	55
2	Carolina Dynamo	28	16	2	2	8	63	33	+30	50
3	Richmond Kickers	28	15	0	2	11	41	35	+6	45
4	Charleston Battery	28	10	2	3	13	39	50	−11	32
5	Raleigh Flyers	28	8	4	3	13	34	52	−18	28
6	Jacksonville Cyclones	29	4	1	1	23	28	73	−45	13

Central Division

Pos	Team	Pld	W	SW	SL	L	GF	GA	GD	Pts
1	New Orleans Riverboat Gamblers	28	13	3	2	10	45	42	+3	42
2	Nashville Metros	28	10	7	2	9	42	34	+8	37
3	Orlando Sundogs	28	12	0	4	12	39	40	−1	36
4	Milwaukee Rampage	28	11	3	2	12	33	36	−3	36
5	Minnesota Thunder	28	11	2	5	10	22	30	−8	35
6	Atlanta Ruckus	28	9	3	1	15	39	48	−9	30

Pacific Division

Pos	Team	Pld	W	SW	SL	L	GF	GA	GD	Pts
1	California Jaguars	28	17	1	0	10	48	34	+14	52
2	Seattle Sounders	28	16	2	3	7	42	19	+23	50
3	Vancouver 86ers	28	15	1	1	11	50	29	+21	46
4	Colorado Foxes	28	15	1	2	10	55	49	+6	46
5	Orange County Zodiac	28	10	1	0	17	35	62	−27	31
6	El Paso Patriots	28	5	3	3	17	30	50	−20	18

== Lamar Hunt U.S. Open Cup ==
=== Bracket ===
Home teams listed on top of bracket

Second round
A-L	Long Island Roughriders	1
USASA	Bridgeport Italians	0
A-L	Richmond Kickers	6
D3P	Philadelphia Freedom	1
D3P	Chicago Stingers	3
A-L	Orlando Sundogs	0
D3P	Austin Lone Stars	0
A-L	New Orleans Riverboat Gamblers (ASDET)	1
D3P	S.F. Bay Seals	1
A-L	Seattle Sounders	0
PDL	Central Coast Roadrunners (ASDET)	3
A-L	California Jaguars	2
A-L	Hershey Wildcats	4
D3P	Central Jersey Riptide	1
A-L	Rochester Rhinos (ASDET)	3
PDL	Mid-Michigan Bucks	2

Third round
MLS	New England Revolution	3
A-L	Long Island Roughriders (ASDET)	4
A-L	Richmond Kickers	0
MLS	MetroStars	3
D3P	Chicago Stingers	2
MLS	Colorado Rapids	1
A-L	New Orleans Riverboat Gamblers	0
MLS	Dallas Burn	3
D3P	S.F. Bay Seals	2
MLS	Kansas City Wizards	1
PDL	Central Coast Roadrunners	2
MLS	San Jose Clash	5
A-L	Hershey Wildcats	0 (2)
MLS	D.C. United (ASDET, PSO)	0 (3)
A-L	Rochester Rhinos	0
MLS	Tampa Bay Mutiny	1

Quarterfinals
A-L	Long Island Roughriders	0
MLS	MetroStars (ASDET)	1
D3P	Chicago Stingers	1
MLS	Dallas Burn	4
D3P	S.F. Bay Seals	2
MLS	San Jose Clash	1
MLS	D.C. United	2
MLS	Tampa Bay Mutiny	0

Semifinals
MLS	MetroStars	1
MLS	Dallas Burn (ASDET)	2
D3P	S.F. Bay Seals	1
MLS	D.C. United	2

Finals
MLS	Dallas Burn (ASDET, PSO)	0 (5)
MLS	D.C. United	0 (3)

=== Final ===
October 30

Dallas Burn	0 – 0 (ASDET)	D.C. United
Penalties
Arcos (penalty scored); Kreis (penalty scored); Sutter (penalty scored); Peinado (penalty scored); Rodríguez (penalty scored)	5 – 3	Etcheverry (penalty scored); Arce (penalty missed); Moreno (penalty scored); Iroha (penalty scored)

Carroll Stadium, Indianapolis
Attendance: 9,766
Referee: Rich Grady

== American clubs in international competitions ==
Club	Competition	Final round
Los Angeles Galaxy	CONCACAF Champions' Cup	Final
D.C. United	CONCACAF Champions' Cup	Third Place
Seattle Sounders	1996 CONCACAF Champions' Cup	Final Group Stage

=== Los Angeles Galaxy ===
July 30 Preliminary round	Los Angeles Galaxy	4 – 1	(Mexico) Santos Laguna	Pasadena, California
	Hurtado 65'; Cienfuegos 66'; Machón 80'; Wélton 85'		Ramírez 71'	Stadium: Rose Bowl; Attendance: 10,271

August 12 Champions' Cup Quarterfinal	Los Angeles Galaxy	2 – 0	(El Salvador) Firpo	Washington, D.C.
	Wélton 45'; Hurtado 78'			Stadium: RFK Stadium

August 22 Champions' Cup Semifinal	D.C. United	0 – 1	Los Angeles Galaxy	Washington, D.C.
			Jones 10'	Stadium: RFK Stadium

August 24 Champions' Cup Final	Los Angeles Galaxy	3 – 5	(Mexico) Cruz Azul	Washington, D.C.
	Hurtado 8', 14'; Campos 78'		Galindo 30' (pen.); Rodríguez 31'; Adomaitis 36'; Hermosillo 62', 66'	Stadium: RFK Stadium

=== D.C. United ===
August 12 Champions' Cup Quarterfinal	D.C. United	1 – 0	(Trinidad and Tobago) United Petrotrin	Washington, D.C.
	Etcheverry 78'			Stadium: RFK Stadium

August 22 Champions' Cup Semifinal	D.C. United	0 – 1	Los Angeles Galaxy	Washington, D.C.
			Jones 10'	Stadium: RFK Stadium

August 24 Champions' Cup Third Place	D.C. United	2 – 2	(Mexico) Guadalajara	Washington, D.C.
	Arce 40'; Iroha 89'		Acosta 55'; Sánchez 86' (pen.)	Stadium: RFK Stadium

=== Seattle Sounders ===
June 17 Qualifying Round	Seattle Sounders	10 – 0	(Suriname) Transvaal	Federal Way, Washington
	Adair; Gailey; Barton; Megson; Galvezon; Crothers			Stadium: Federal Way Memorial Stadium; Attendance: 2,153

July 15 Group Stage	(Guatemala) C.S.D. Comunicaciones	2 – 0	Seattle Sounders	Guatemala City, Guatemala
	Suazo 44'; Fernández 83'

July 18 Group Stage	Seattle Sounders	1 – 4	(Mexico) Club Necaxa	Guatemala City, Guatemala
	Hattrup 91' (pen.)		Almaguer 32'; Blanco 47', 89'; Vásquez 75'

July 20 Group Stage	Seattle Sounders	0 – 11	(Mexico) Cruz Azul	Guatemala City, Guatemala
			Palencia 3'; Hermosillo 13', 32', 49'; Yegros 15', 53', 62'; Adomaitis 34'; Galindo 35'; Barton 72' (o.g.); Ramírez 74' (pen.)
