= 1996 in American soccer =

Soccer in the United States
- Season: 1996

Men's soccer
- Supporters' Shield: Tampa Bay Mutiny
- A-League: Seattle Sounders
- USISL Select: California Jaguars
- USISL Pro: Charleston Battery
- USISL Premier: Central Coast Roadrunners
- NCAA-I: St. John's Red Storm
- U.S. Open Cup: D.C. United
- MLS Cup: D.C. United

Women's soccer
- NCAA-I: North Carolina Tar Heels
- NCAA-II: Franklin Pierce Ravens
- NCAA-III: UC San Diego Tritons

The 1996 season was the 84th year of competitive season in the United States. It was the first season of the present top division of American soccer, Major League Soccer.

== National teams ==
=== Men's ===
==== Senior ====
Wins	Losses	Draws
10	4	2

===== Friendlies =====
May 26	United States	2–1	Scotland	New Britain, Connecticut
	Wynalda 13' (pen.); Jones 72'		Durie 9'	Stadium: Veterans Stadium; Attendance: 8,526; Referee: Arturo Brizo Carter (Mexico)

August 30	United States	3–1	El Salvador	Los Angeles, California
	Moore 3', 88' (pen.); Wynalda 61'		Lazo 61'	Stadium: Los Angeles Memorial Coliseum; Attendance: 18,861; Referee: Joshua Patlak (United States)

October 16	Peru	4–1	United States	Lima, Peru
	Palacios 33'; Olivares 68'; Maldonado 73'; Solano 83'		Brose 43'	Stadium: Estadio Nacional de Lima; Attendance: 8,019; Referee: Juan Luna (Bolivia)

===== 1996 CONCACAF Gold Cup =====
====== Group C ======
Pos	Team	Pld	W	D	L	GF	GA	GD	Pts	Qualification
1	United States	2	2	0	0	5	2	+3	6	Advance to Knockout stage
2	El Salvador	2	1	0	1	3	4	−1	3	
3	Trinidad and Tobago	2	0	0	2	4	6	−2	0	

January 13	United States	3–2	Trinidad and Tobago	Anaheim, California
	Wynalda 15', 34'; Moore 53'	Report	Dwarika 6', 43'	Stadium: Anaheim Stadium; Attendance: 12,425; Referee: Argelio Sabillon (Honduras)

January 16	United States	2–0	El Salvador	Anaheim, California
	Wynalda 63'; Balboa 75'	Report		Stadium: Anaheim Stadium, Anaheim; Attendance: 52,345; Referee: Ramesh Ramdhan (Trinidad and Tobago)

====== Knockout stage ======
January 18 SF	United States	0–1	Brazil	Los Angeles, California
		https://archive.today/20120808074112/http://concacaf.globalsportsmedia.com/page.php?sport=soccer&language_id=us&page=tournament&view=match&match_id=251104 Report	Balboa 79' (o.g.)	Stadium: Los Angeles Memorial Coliseum; Attendance: 20,708; Referee: Armando Archundia (Mexico)

January 21 CON	United States	3–0	Guatemala	Los Angeles, California
	Wynalda 34'; Agoos 37'; Kirovski 87'	Report		Stadium: Los Angeles Memorial Coliseum; Attendance: 88,155; Referee: René Parra (Canada)

===== 1998 FIFA World Cup qualification =====
====== CONCACAF third round ======
Pos	Team	Pld	W	D	L	GF	GA	GD	Pts
1	United States	6	4	1	1	10	5	5	13
2	Costa Rica	6	4	0	2	9	5	4	12
3	Guatemala	6	2	2	2	6	9	-3	8
4	Trinidad and Tobago	6	0	1	5	3	9	-6	1

November 3	United States	2–0	Guatemala	Washington, D.C.
	Wynalda 54'; McBride 87'	Report		Stadium: RFK Stadium; Attendance: 30,082; Referee: Charles Barrett (Jamaica)

November 10	United States	2–0	Trinidad and Tobago	Richmond, Virginia
	Dooley 53'; Wynalda 84'	Report		Stadium: University of Richmond Stadium; Attendance: 19,312; Referee: Arturo Brizio Carter (Mexico)

November 24	Trinidad and Tobago	0–1	United States	Port of Spain, Trinidad and Tobago
		Report	Moore 36'	Stadium: Hasely Crawford Stadium; Attendance: 4,000; Referee: Mark Forde (Barbados)

December 1	Costa Rica	2–1	United States	San José, Costa Rica
	Wanchope 39'; Lopez 84'	Report	Cobi Jones 89'	Stadium: Estadio Ricardo Saprissa Aymá; Attendance: 18,000; Referee: Peter Prendergast (Jamaica)

December 14	United States	2–1	Costa Rica	Palo Alto, California
	McBride 16'; Lassiter 60'	Report	Gomez 74'	Stadium: Stanford Stadium; Attendance: 40,527; Referee: León Padro Borja (Mexico)

December 21	Guatemala	2–2	United States	Estadio Cuscatlán, San Salvador
	Funes 9'; Plata 44'	Report	Preki 7'; Hejduk 48'	Attendance: 43,000; Referee: Mike Seifert (Canada)

===== 1996 U.S. Cup =====
June 8	United States	2–1	Republic of Ireland	Foxborough, Massachusetts
	Ramos 58'; Reyna 76'		Connolly 57'	Stadium: Foxboro Stadium; Attendance: 25,332; Referee: Peter Prendergast (Jamaica)

June 12	United States	0–2	Bolivia	Washington, D.C.
			Moreno 2'; Coimbra 88'	Stadium: RFK Stadium; Attendance: 19,350; Referee: Dino Bucci (Canada)

June 16	United States	2–2	Mexico	Pasadena, California
	Wynalda 34'; Dooley 90'		R. García 45'; Blanco 89'	Stadium: Rose Bowl; Attendance: 92,216

===== Goalscorers =====
Player	Goals
Eric Wynalda	8
Joe-Max Moore	4
Thomas Dooley	2
Cobi Jones	2
Brian McBride	2
Jeff Agoos	1
Marcelo Balboa	1
Dario Brose	1
Frankie Hejduk	1
Jovan Kirovski	1
Roy Lassiter	1
Preki	1
Tab Ramos	1
Claudio Reyna	1

==== U–23 ====
===== Summer Olympics =====
====== Group A ======
Team	Pld	W	D	L	GF	GA	GD	Pts
Argentina	3	1	2	0	5	3	+2	5
Portugal	3	1	2	0	4	2	+2	5
United States	3	1	1	1	4	4	0	4
Tunisia	3	0	1	2	1	5	−4	1

July 20	United States	1–3	Argentina	Birmingham, Alabama
7:30 p.m.	Reyna 1'	Report	G. López 26'; Crespo 55'; Simeone 90'	Stadium: Legion Field; Attendance: 83,183; Referee: Lucien Bouchardeau (Niger)

July 22	United States	2–0	Tunisia	Birmingham, Alabama
7:30 p.m.	Kirovski 38'; Maisonneuve 90'	Report		Stadium: Legion Field; Attendance: 45,687; Referee: Hugh Dallas (England)

July 24	United States	1–1	Portugal	Washington, D.C.
7:30 p.m.	Maisonneuve 75'	Report	Paulo Alves 33'	Stadium: RFK Stadium; Attendance: 58,012; Referee: Eddie Lennie (Australia)

==== U–20 ====
===== 1996 CONCACAF U-20 Tournament =====
====== Group 2 ======
Pos	Team	Pld	W	D	L	GF	GA	GD	Pts	Qualification
1	United States	3	2	1	0	6	1	+5	7	1997 FIFA U-20 World Cup and Championship group
2	Jamaica	3	2	0	1	5	4	+1	6	Qualifying group
3	Honduras	3	1	1	1	3	1	+2	4	
4	Martinique	3	0	0	3	0	8	−8	0	

Source: RSSSF

April 15	Jamaica	1–4	United States	Monterrey, Mexico
		Report		Stadium: Estadio Tecnológico

April 17	Martinique	0–2	United States	Monterrey, Mexico
		Report		Stadium: Estadio Tecnológico

April 19	Honduras	0–0	United States	Monterrey, Mexico
		Report		Stadium: Estadio Tecnológico

===== Championship group =====
April 23	Canada	2–0	United States	Saltillo, Mexico
	De Rosario 81'; Jordan 83'	Report		Stadium: Estadio Madero

April 25	Mexico	2–1	United States	Saltillo, Mexico
		Report		Stadium: Estadio Madero

==== U–17 ====
===== 1996 CONCACAF U-17 Championship =====
====== Group A ======
Pos	Team	Pld	W	D	L	GF	GA	GD	Pts	Qualification
1	Costa Rica	3	3	0	0	13	4	+9	9	Qualified to the Final round
2	United States	3	2	0	1	10	3	+7	6	Qualified to the Final round
3	Dominican Republic	2	0	0	2	1	5	−4	0	Eliminated
4	Bermuda	2	0	0	2	1	13	−12	0	Eliminated

Source: RSSSF

August 18	Bermuda	0–5	United States	Port of Spain, Trinidad and Tobago
		Report		Stadium: Hasely Crawford Stadium

August 20	Dominican Republic	0–3	United States	Port of Spain, Trinidad and Tobago
		Report		Stadium: Hasely Crawford Stadium

August 22	Costa Rica	3–2	United States	Port of Spain, Trinidad and Tobago
		Report		Stadium: Hasely Crawford Stadium

====== Final Round ======
Pos	Team	Pld	W	D	L	GF	GA	GD	Pts	Qualification
1	Mexico	3	3	0	0	8	1	+7	9	Qualified to 1997 FIFA U-17 World Championship
2	United States	3	1	1	1	4	4	0	4	Qualified to 1997 FIFA U-17 World Championship
3	Costa Rica	3	1	1	1	4	6	−2	4	Qualified to 1997 FIFA U-17 World Championship
4	Canada	3	0	0	3	1	6	−5	0	Eliminated

Source: RSSSF

August 26	Mexico	3–1	United States	Port of Spain, Trinidad and Tobago
		Report		Stadium: Hasely Crawford Stadium

August 28	Canada	0–2	United States	Port of Spain, Trinidad and Tobago
		Report		Stadium: Hasely Crawford Stadium

August 30	Costa Rica	1–1	United States	Port of Spain, Trinidad and Tobago
		Report		Stadium: Hasely Crawford Stadium

== League Tables ==
=== Major League Soccer ===
Pos	Team	Pld	W	SOW	L	GF	GA	GD	Pts	Qualification
1	Tampa Bay Mutiny (S)	32	19	1	12	66	51	+15	58	
2	Los Angeles Galaxy	32	15	4	13	59	49	+10	49	CONCACAF Champions' Cup
3	D.C. United (C)	32	15	1	16	62	56	+6	46	CONCACAF Champions' Cup
4	Dallas Burn	32	12	5	15	50	48	+2	41	
5	Kansas City Wiz	32	12	5	15	61	63	−2	41	
6	NY/NJ MetroStars	32	12	3	17	45	47	−2	39	
7	San Jose Clash	32	12	3	17	50	50	0	39	
8	Columbus Crew	32	11	4	17	59	60	−1	37	
9	New England Revolution	32	9	6	17	43	56	−13	33	
10	Colorado Rapids	32	9	2	21	44	59	−15	29	

Source: MLS
Rules for classification: 1) points; 2) head-to-head record; 3) goal difference; 4) number of goals scored
(C) Champions; (S) Supporters' Shield

=== A-League ===
- Win = 3 points
- Shootout win (SW) = 1 point
- Loss = 0 points

Place	Team	GP	W	SW	L	GF	GA	GD	Points
1	Montreal Impact	27	17	4	6	40	18	+22	55
2	Colorado Foxes	27	14	2	11	55	33	+22	44
3	Seattle Sounders	27	12	4	11	35	25	+10	40
4	Rochester Rhinos	27	11	3	13	44	42	+2	36
5	Vancouver 86ers	27	10	3	14	38	38	+0	33
6	New York Fever	27	6	3	8	30	40	–10	21
7	Atlanta Ruckus	22	3	0	19	14	60	–46	9

== U.S. Open Cup ==
=== Bracket ===
Second round
USASA	San Jose Oaks	0
A-L	Seattle Sounders	1
A-L	New York Fever	0
USISL	Carolina Dynamo	1
A-L	Rochester Rhinos	2
USISL	Fort Myers Manatees	0
A-L	Colorado Foxes	5
USISL	El Paso Patriots	1

Quarterfinals
MLS	Dallas Burn	3
A-L	Seattle Sounders	2
MLS	D.C. United	2
USISL	Carolina Dynamo	0
A-L	Rochester Rhinos (AET)	4
MLS	Tampa Bay Mutiny	3
MLS	Kansas City Wiz	2
MLS	Colorado Rapids	3

Semifinal
MLS	Dallas Burn	0
MLS	D.C. United	2
A-L	Rochester Rhinos	3
MLS	Colorado Rapids	0

Final
MLS	D.C. United	3
A-L	Rochester Rhinos	0

=== Final ===
October 30, 1996

Rochester Raging Rhinos (A-L)	0–3	D.C. United (MLS)
		Raúl Díaz Arce 45'; Eddie Pope 63'; Jaime Moreno 89'

Robert F. Kennedy Memorial Stadium; Washington, D.C.
Attendance: 7,234
Referee: Esse Baharmast (USA)

== American clubs in international competitions ==
=== Seattle Sounders ===
June 17 Qualifying Round	Seattle Sounders (United States)	10–0	(Suriname) Transvaal	Federal Way, Washington
	Adair; Gailey; Barton; Megson; Galvezon; Crothers			Stadium: Federal Way Memorial Stadium; Attendance: 2,153

July 15 Group Stage	C.S.D. Comunicaciones (Guatemala)	2–0	(United States) Seattle Sounders	Guatemala City, Guatemala
	Suazo 44'; Fernández 83'

July 18 Group Stage	Seattle Sounders	1–4	(Mexico) Necaxa	Guatemala City, Guatemala
	Hattrup 91' (pen.)		Almaguer 32'; Blanco 47', 89'; Vásquez 75'

July 20 Group Stage	Seattle Sounders (United States)	0–11	(Mexico) Cruz Azul	Guatemala City, Guatemala
			Palencia 3'; Hermosillo 13', 32', 49'; Yegros 15', 53', 62'; Adomaitis 34'; Galindo 35'; Barton 72' (o.g.); Ramirez 74' (pen.)
