= 1996 CONCACAF Champions' Cup =

32nd edition of premier club football tournament organized by CONCACAF

Tournament details
- Host country: Guatemala
- City: Guatemala City
- Dates: July 15 – 20
- Teams: 4 (from 3 associations)

Final positions
- Champions: (Mexico) Cruz Azul (4th title)
- Runners-up: (Mexico) Necaxa

Tournament statistics
- Matches played: 6
- Goals scored: 29 (4.83 per match)

The 1996 CONCACAF Champions' Cup was the 32nd edition of the annual international club football competition held in the CONCACAF region (North America, Central America and the Caribbean), the CONCACAF Champions' Cup. It determined that year's club champion of association football in the CONCACAF region and was played from March 9, 1996, through July 20, 1997.

The teams were split into 2 zones (North/ Central and Caribbean). The North/Central zone was split into 3 groups, qualifying each winner to the final tournament. The winner of the Caribbean zone, earned a place in a playoff against the U.S. representative for a spot in the final tournament. All qualifying matches in the tournament were played under the home/away match system, while the final tournament was played in Guatemala City.

That final stage composed of four teams which played each other in a single round-robin tournament. Mexican team Cruz Azul won their fourth CONCACAF trophy, after finishing 1st. in the final table with 7 points over 3 matches played.

== North/Central American Zone ==
=== Group 1 ===
First Round

Team 1	Agg.	Team 2	1st leg	2nd leg
Alajuelense (Costa Rica)	6–3	(El Salvador) FAS	4–2	2–1
Árabe Unido (Panama)	2–1	(Nicaragua) Real Estelí	1–1	0-1
La Victoria (Belize)	3–7	(Honduras) Victoria	1–3	4-2

Cruz Azul on bye to the Third round.

March 9, 1996 1st leg	Alajuelense (Costa Rica)	4–2	(El Salvador) FAS	Alajuela, Costa Rica
	Rónald Gómez; Mauricio Montero; Luis Marín Murillo		Rodríguez; Mayén	Attendance: 2,000

March 31, 1996 2nd leg	FAS (El Salvador)	1-2	(Costa Rica) Alajuelense	El Salvador
	Bolsonello 6'		56' González; 89' Miso

- Alajuelense won 6–3 on aggregated.

March 15, 1996 1st leg	Árabe Unido (Panama)	1–1	(Nicaragua) Real Estelí	Panama
	Clarke 58'		35' (pen.) Oliva

March 17, 1996 2nd leg	Real Estelí (Nicaragua)	0–1	(Panama) Árabe Unido	Panama
			74' Chiari

- Árabe Unido won 2–1 on aggregated.

March 17, 1996 1st leg	La Victoria (Belize)	1–3	(Honduras) Victoria	Belize

April 14, 1996 2nd leg	Victoria (Honduras)	4–2	(Belize) La Victoria	Honduras

- Victoria won 7–3 on aggregated.

Second Round

Team 1	Agg.	Team 2	1st leg	2nd leg
Victoria (Honduras)	3–2	(Panama) Árabe Unido	1–0	2–2

Alajuelense on bye to the Fourth round.

June 16, 1996 1st leg	Victoria (Honduras)	1–0	(Panama) Árabe Unido	Honduras

June 18, 1996 2nd leg	Árabe Unido (Panama)	2–2	(Honduras) Victoria	Colon, Panama
	Abdul Chiari; Carlos Brown		Renán Aguilera x2	Stadium: Roberto Mariano Bula Stadium

- Victoria won 3–2 on aggregated.

Third Round

Team 1	Agg.	Team 2	1st leg	2nd leg
Victoria (Honduras)	1-2	(Mexico) Cruz Azul	1–0	2–0

October 23, 1996 1st leg	Victoria (Honduras)	1–0	(Mexico) Cruz Azul	Honduras
	Aguilera 32'

November 5, 1996 2nd leg	Cruz Azul (Mexico)	2–0	(Honduras) Victoria	Mexico
	de Oliveira 45'; Zamora 87'

- Cruz Azul won 2–1 on aggregated.

Fourth Round

Team 1	Agg.	Team 2	1st leg	2nd leg
Alajuelense (Costa Rica)	2-5	(Mexico) Cruz Azul	0-2	3-2

January 4, 1997 1st leg	Alajuelense (Costa Rica)	0–2	(Mexico) Cruz Azul	Costa Rica
			5' Hermosillo; 75' Reynoso

January 8, 1997 2nd leg	Cruz Azul (Mexico)	3–2	(Costa Rica) Alajuelense	Mexico
	Hermosillo 42' 58'; Verdirame 54'		66' 73' Ledesma

- Cruz Azul won 5–2 on aggregated.
- Cruz Azul advanced to the CONCACAF Final Group stage.

=== Group 2 ===
First Round

Team 1	Agg.	Team 2	1st leg	2nd leg
Saprissa (Costa Rica)	4-3	(Honduras) Olimpia	4-0	3-0

- Necaxa on bye to second round.

March 17, 1996	Saprissa (Costa Rica)	4–0	(Honduras) Olimpia	San José, Costa Rica
				Stadium: Estadio Ricardo Saprissa Aymá

May 7, 1996	Olimpia (Honduras)	3–0 (3–4 agg.)	(Costa Rica) Saprissa	Tegucigalpa, Honduras
				Stadium: Estadio Tiburcio Carías Andino

Second Round

Team 1	Agg.	Team 2	1st leg	2nd leg
Saprissa (Costa Rica)	3-4	(Mexico) Necaxa	2-2	2-1

September 15, 1996	Saprissa (Costa Rica)	2–2	(Mexico) Necaxa	San José, Costa Rica
	González 6' 79'		10' (pen.) Aguinaga; 16' Zárate	Stadium: Estadio Ricardo Saprissa Aymá

January 7, 1997	Necaxa (Mexico)	2–1 (4–3 agg.)	(Costa Rica) Saprissa	Querétaro City, Mexico
	Zárate 48'; Peláez 84'		17' Drummond	Stadium: Estadio Corregidora

- Necaxa advanced to the CONCACAF Final Group stage.

=== Group 3 ===
First Round

Team 1	Agg.	Team 2	1st leg	2nd leg
CSD Comunicaciones (Guatemala)	6–0	(Panama) Cosmos	4–0	2–0
C.S.D. Sacachispas (Guatemala)	5–3	(Nicaragua) Juventus Managua	3–1	2–2

- (Belize) Juventus F.C. on bye, to the second round.

CSD Comunicaciones (Guatemala)	4–0	(Panama) Cosmos

Cosmos (Panama)	0–2 (0-6 agg.)	(Guatemala) CSD Comunicaciones

March 21, 1996	C.S.D. Sacachispas (Guatemala)	3–1	(Nicaragua) Juventus Managua
	Gustavo Benzano; Lucio Catarino Da Silva; Araeli López		Ivan Bravo

Juventus Managua (Nicaragua)	2–2 (3–5 agg.)	(Guatemala) C.S.D. Sacachispas

Second Round

Team 1	Agg.	Team 2	1st leg	2nd leg
CSD Comunicaciones (Guatemala)	5–1	(Guatemala) C.S.D. Sacachispas	2–1	3–0

- (Belize) Juventus F.C. on bye, to the third round.

CSD Comunicaciones (Guatemala)	2–1	(Guatemala) C.S.D. Sacachispas

C.S.D. Sacachispas (Guatemala)	0–3 (1–5 agg.)	(Guatemala) CSD Comunicaciones

Third Round

Team 1	Agg.	Team 2	1st leg	2nd leg
Juventus (Belize)	1–8	(Guatemala) CSD Comunicaciones	1–1	0–7

- CSD Comunicaciones advance to the Final Group stage.

Juventus (Belize)	1–1	(Guatemala) CSD Comunicaciones

CSD Comunicaciones (Guatemala)	7–0 (8–1 agg.)	(Belize) Juventus

== Caribbean Zone ==
=== First round ===
Team 1	Agg.	Team 2	1st leg	2nd leg
US Sinnamary (French Guiana)	w/o*	(Suriname) SV Prakash	0–0	
SV Transvaal (Suriname)	w/o**	(Guadeloupe) Red Star (Pointe-à-Pitre)		

- US Sinnamary withdrew after 1st leg*
- Red Star withdrew before 1st leg**

=== Second round ===
Team 1	Agg.	Team 2	1st leg	2nd leg
SV Transvaal (Suriname)	1–0	(Suriname) SV Prakash	0–0	1–0

- SV Transvaal advance to the USA/Caribbean playoff.

SV Transvaal (Suriname)	0–0	(Suriname) SV Prakash

SV Prakash (Suriname)	0–1 (0–1 agg.)	(Suriname) SV Transvaal

== U.S./Caribbean Playoff ==
Team 1	Score	Team 2
Seattle Sounders (United States)	10–0	(Suriname) SV Transvaal

- Seattle Sounders advance to the Final Group stage.

June 17, 1997	Seattle Sounders (United States)	10–0	(Suriname) SV Transvaal	Federal Way, Washington
19:30 PDT (UTC−7)	Adair 2', 15', 79'; Gailey 32', 38'; Megson 42'; Gelvezon 49'; Crothers 70'; Barton 73', 82'	Report		Stadium: Federal Way Memorial Stadium; Attendance: 2,153

== Final group stage ==
Final stage was played in Guatemala City, Guatemala. July 15–20, 1997.

Pos	Team	Pld	W	D	L	GF	GA	GD	Pts
1	(Mexico) Cruz Azul	3	2	1	0	14	2	+12	7
2	(Mexico) Necaxa	3	1	2	0	8	5	+3	5
3	(Guatemala) Comunicaciones	3	1	1	1	6	5	+1	4
4	(United States) Seattle Sounders	3	0	0	3	1	17	−16	0

Source: RSSSF

=== Matches ===
All the games played in Guatemala City:

1996 CONCACAF Champions' Cup Final Stage
July 15, 1997
19:00 CST (UTC−6)
Round 1

Comunicaciones (Guatemala)	2–0	(United States) Seattle Sounders
Suazo 44'; Fernández 83'

Estadio Nacional Mateo Flores
Attendance: 25,000

July 15, 1997
Round 1

Necaxa (Mexico)	1–1	(Mexico) Cruz Azul
Pavón 14'		Hermosillo 48'

July 18, 1997
17:00 CST (UTC−6)
Round 2

Seattle Sounders (United States)	1–4	(Mexico) Necaxa
Hattrup 91' (pen.)		Almaguer 32'; Blanco 47', 89'; Vásquez 75'

July 18, 1997
Round 2

Comunicaciones (Guatemala)	1–2	(Mexico) Cruz Azul
Núñez 90'		Adomaitis 33', 37'

July 20, 1997
Round 3

Comunicaciones (Guatemala)	3–3	(Mexico) Necaxa
Julio Rodas 24', 48'; Núñez 32'		Pineda 47' (pen.); Pavón 60'; Montes de Oca 70'

July 20, 1997
9:00 CST (UTC−6)
Round 3

Seattle Sounders (United States)	0–11	(Mexico) Cruz Azul
		Palencia 3'; Hermosillo 13', 32', 49'; Yegros 15', 53', 62'; Adomaitis 34'; Galindo 35'; Barton 72' (o.g.); Ramírez 74' (pen.)

== Champion ==
CONCACAF Champions' Cup
1996 Winners
(Mexico)
Cruz Azul
4th title
