= Neil Megson =

Neil Megson may refer to:

- Genesis P-Orridge (Neil Megson, born 1950), English singer-songwriter, musician, writer, and artist
- Neil Megson (soccer) (born 1962), retired U.S. soccer midfielder
