= United States at the FIFA Confederations Cup =

Soccer tournament results

The United States men's national soccer team represented the United States at the FIFA Confederations Cup on four occasions, in 1992, 1999, 2003 and 2009.

== Record at the FIFA Confederations Cup ==
FIFA Confederations Cup record
| Year | Result | Position | Pld | W | D | L | GF | GA |
|---|---|---|---|---|---|---|---|---|
| (Saudi Arabia) 1992 | Third place | 3rd | 2 | 1 | 0 | 1 | 5 | 5 |
| (Saudi Arabia) 1995 | Did not qualify | | | | | | | |
| (Saudi Arabia) 1997 | Did not qualify | | | | | | | |
| (Mexico) 1999 | Third place | 3rd | 5 | 3 | 0 | 2 | 6 | 3 |
| (South Korea) (Japan) 2001 | Did not qualify | | | | | | | |
| (France) 2003 | Group stage | 7th | 3 | 0 | 1 | 2 | 1 | 3 |
| (Germany) 2005 | Did not qualify | | | | | | | |
| (South Africa) 2009 | Runners-up | 2nd | 5 | 2 | 0 | 3 | 8 | 9 |
| (Brazil) 2013 | Did not qualify | | | | | | | |
| (Russia) 2017 | Did not qualify | | | | | | | |
| Total | Runners-up | 4/10 | 15 | 6 | 1 | 8 | 20 | 20 |

== 1992 King Fahd Cup ==
=== Semifinals ===
October 15, 1992

| Saudi Arabia | 3 – 0 | United States |
|---|---|---|
| Al Bishi 48'; Al-Thunayan 74'; Al Muwallid 84' | (Report) |

King Fahd II Stadium, Riyadh
Attendance: 70,000
Referee: Da Silva (Brazil)

=== Third place play-off ===
October 19, 1992

| United States | 5 – 2 | Ivory Coast |
|---|---|---|
| Balboa 12'; Jones 31'; Wynalda 56'; Murray 67', 83' | (Report) | Traoré 16'; Sie 76' |

King Fahd II Stadium, Riyadh
Attendance: 9,500
Referee: Badilla (Costa Rica)

== 1999 FIFA Confederations Cup ==
=== Group B ===
| Team | Pld | W | D | L | GF | GA | GD | Pts |
|---|---|---|---|---|---|---|---|---|
| Brazil | 3 | 3 | 0 | 0 | 7 | 0 | +7 | 9 |
| United States | 3 | 2 | 0 | 1 | 4 | 2 | +2 | 6 |
| Germany | 3 | 1 | 0 | 2 | 2 | 6 | −4 | 3 |
| New Zealand | 3 | 0 | 0 | 3 | 1 | 6 | −5 | 0 |

July 24, 1999
2:30 p.m. CDT

| New Zealand | 1 – 2 | United States |
|---|---|---|
| Zoricich 90+3' | (Report) | McBride 25'; Kirovski 58' |

Estadio Jalisco, Guadalajara
Attendance: 60,000
Referee: Ubaldo Aquino (Paraguay)

July 28, 1999
8:30 p.m. CDT

| Brazil | 1 – 0 | United States |
|---|---|---|
| Ronaldinho 13' | (Report) |

Estadio Jalisco, Guadalajara
Attendance: 54,000
Referee: Anders Frisk (Sweden)

July 30, 1999
6:00 p.m. CDT

| United States | 2 – 0 | Germany |
|---|---|---|
| Olsen 23'; Moore 50' | (Report) |

Estadio Jalisco, Guadalajara
Attendance: 53,000
Referee: Gilberto Alcala (Mexico)

=== Semifinals ===
August 1, 1999
12:00 p.m. CDT

| Mexico | 1 – 0 (a.e.t.) | United States |
|---|---|---|
| Blanco 97' | (Report) |

Estadio Azteca, Mexico City
Attendance: 82,000
Referee: Kim Young-Joo (Korea Republic)

=== Third place play-off ===
August 3, 1999 win
9:00 p.m. CDT

| United States | 2 – 0 | Saudi Arabia |
|---|---|---|
| Bravo 27'; McBride 78' | fifa#$(Report) |

Estadio Jalisco, Guadalajara
Attendance: 38,000
Referee: Ubaldo Aquino (Paraguay)

== 2003 FIFA Confederations Cup ==
=== Group B ===
| Team | Pld | W | D | L | GF | GA | GD | Pts |
|---|---|---|---|---|---|---|---|---|
| Cameroon | 3 | 2 | 1 | 0 | 2 | 0 | +2 | 7 |
| Turkey | 3 | 1 | 1 | 1 | 4 | 4 | 0 | 4 |
| Brazil | 3 | 1 | 1 | 1 | 3 | 3 | 0 | 4 |
| United States | 3 | 0 | 1 | 2 | 1 | 3 | −2 | 1 |

June 19, 2003
7:00 p.m. CEST

| Turkey | 2 – 1 | United States |
|---|---|---|
| Okan Y. 40' (pen.); Tuncay 73' | (Report) | Beasley 37' |

Stade Geoffroy-Guichard, Saint-Etienne
Attendance: 16,944
Referee: Jorge Larrionda (Uruguay)

June 21, 2003
9:00 p.m. CEST

| Brazil | 1 – 0 | United States |
|---|---|---|
| Adriano 22' | (Report) |

Stade de Gerland, Lyon
Attendance: 20,306
Referee: Lucílio Batista (Portugal)

June 23, 2003
9:00 p.m. CEST

| United States | 0 – 0 | Cameroon |
|---|---|---|
| | (Report) |

Stade de Gerland, Lyon
Attendance: 19,206
Referee: Mark Shield (Australia)

== 2009 FIFA Confederations Cup ==
=== Group B ===
| Team | Pld | W | D | L | GF | GA | GD | Pts |
|---|---|---|---|---|---|---|---|---|
| Brazil | 3 | 3 | 0 | 0 | 10 | 3 | +7 | 9 |
| United States | 3 | 1 | 0 | 2 | 4 | 6 | −2 | 3 |
| Italy | 3 | 1 | 0 | 2 | 3 | 5 | −2 | 3 |
| Egypt | 3 | 1 | 0 | 2 | 4 | 7 | −3 | 3 |

June 15, 2009
8:30 p.m. SAST

| United States | 1–3 | Italy |
|---|---|---|
| Donovan 41' (pen.) | (Report) | Rossi 58', 90+4'; De Rossi 72' |

Loftus Versfeld Stadium, Pretoria
Attendance: 34,341
Referee: Pablo Pozo (Chile)

June 18, 2009
4:00 p.m. SAST

| United States | 0–3 | Brazil |
|---|---|---|
| | (Report) | Felipe Melo 7'; Robinho 20'; Maicon 62' |

Loftus Versfeld Stadium, Pretoria
Attendance: 39,617
Referee: Massimo Busacca (Switzerland)

June 21, 2009
8:30 p.m. SAST

| Egypt | 0–3 | United States |
|---|---|---|
| | (Report) | Davies 21'; Bradley 63'; Dempsey 71' |

Royal Bafokeng Stadium, Rustenburg
Attendance: 23,140
Referee: Michael Hester (New Zealand)

=== Semifinals ===
June 24, 2009
8:30 p.m. SAST

| Spain | 0–2 | United States |
|---|---|---|
| | (Report) | Altidore 27'; Dempsey 74' |

Free State Stadium, Bloemfontein
Attendance: 35,369
Referee: Jorge Larrionda (Uruguay)

=== Final ===
June 28, 2009
8:30 p.m. SAST

| United States | 2–3 | Brazil |
|---|---|---|
| Dempsey 10'; Donovan 27' | (Report) | Luís Fabiano 46', 74'; Lúcio 84' |

Ellis Park Stadium, Johannesburg
Attendance: 52,291
Referee: Martin Hansson (Sweden)

== Goalscorers ==
| Player | Goals | 1992 | 1999 | 2003 | 2009 |
|---|---|---|---|---|---|
| Clint Dempsey | 3 | | | | 3 |
| Landon Donovan | 2 | | | | 2 |
| Brian McBride | 2 | | 2 | | |
| Bruce Murray | 2 | 2 | | | |
| Jozy Altidore | 1 | | | | 1 |
| Marcelo Balboa | 1 | 1 | | | |
| DaMarcus Beasley | 1 | | | 1 | |
| Michael Bradley | 1 | | | | 1 |
| Paul Bravo | 1 | | 1 | | |
| Charlie Davies | 1 | | | | 1 |
| Cobi Jones | 1 | 1 | | | |
| Jovan Kirovski | 1 | | 1 | | |
| Joe-Max Moore | 1 | | 1 | | |
| Ben Olsen | 1 | | 1 | | |
| Eric Wynalda | 1 | 1 | | | |
| Total | 20 | 5 | 6 | 1 | 8 |

== See also ==
- United States at the CONCACAF Gold Cup
- United States at the Copa América
- United States at the FIFA World Cup
