= United States at the Copa América =

Soccer delegations

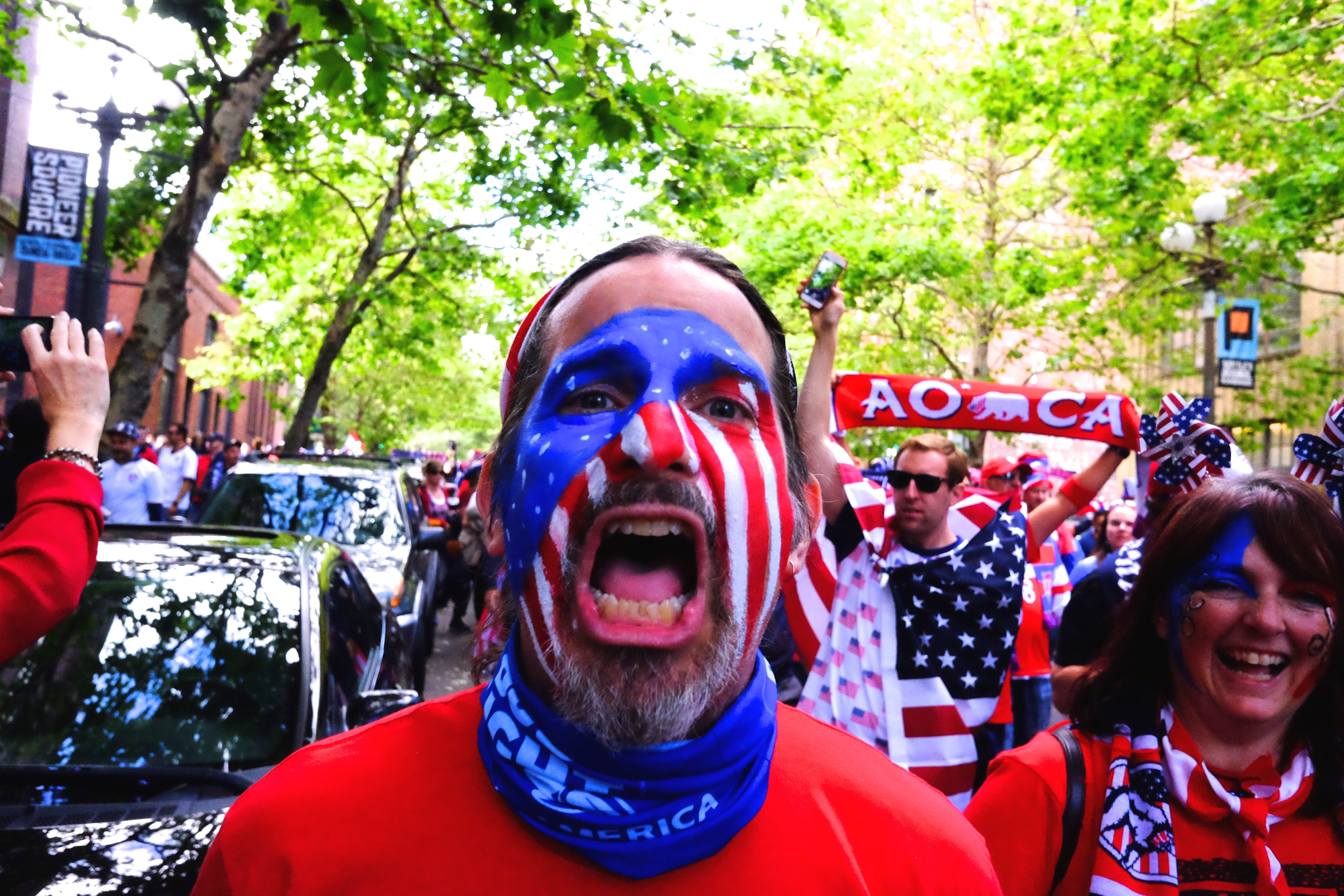
U.S. fans celebrating before the quarterfinal of the Copa América Centenario against Ecuador in Seattle.

The United States are not members of the CONMEBOL, the governing body of football in South America, but because CONMEBOL only has ten member associations, guest nations have regularly been invited to the Copa América since 1993. With five participations, the U.S. are the second-most regular invitee behind Mexico, which has eleven participations.

== History ==
The Copa América is South America's major tournament in senior men's soccer and determines the continental champion. Until 1967, the tournament was known as South American Championship. It is the oldest continental championship in the world.

Until 1991, no nation outside of CONMEBOL took part in the tournament. Guest invitees only started to play in the 1993 edition. The United States was among the first two guest participants in the Copa América edition played in Ecuador that year, along with Mexico.

In the 1993 edition, the US lost to Uruguay 1-0, to host country Ecuador 2-0, and tied 3-3 with Venezuela, being knocked out in the group stage.

For the 1995 edition held in Uruguay, the US defeated Chile in the first match 2-1, lost to Bolivia 1-0 in the second match, and won 3-0 in an upset against Argentina in the final match, advancing in first place with 6 points. The Americans defeated Mexico in the quarterfinals on penalties 4-1 after a goalless draw, but lost the semifinals 1-0 to Brazil and the third place 4-1 to Colombia, finishing fourth.

The United States was not invited to the 1997, 1999, 2001 and 2004 editions (held in Bolivia, Paraguay, Colombia and Peru respectively.

The United States returned to the Copa América in 2007, when the competition was held in Venezuela. In that tournament, the US lost all three matches, 4-1 to Argentina in the first match, 3-1 to Paraguay in the second, and 1-0 to Colombia in the third, meaning the team was eliminated in the group stage.

After this edition, the US was not invited to the 2011 edition held in Argentina, and the 2015 one hosted by Chile.

In 2016, the United States returned to the competition, this time as the hosts of the Copa América Centenario, which celebrated the hundredth anniversary of the tournament with a larger competition, co-organized by CONCACAF and CONMEBOL. This made them the first non-South American country to ever host the Copa América. The US started the tournament by losing 2-0 to Colombia, winning 4-0 against Costa Rica, and 1-0 against Paraguay, meaning the team advanced to the knockout phase, where the team won the quarterfinals against Ecuador 2-1, only to lose to Argentina 4-0 and the third place 1-0 against Colombia. The team again finished in fourth place.

The US was not invited to the 2019 and the 2021 editions held in Brazil.

In 2024, the United States hosted the tournament, although for the first time they did not receive an automatic invitation and had to qualify through the CONCACAF Nations League. The US qualified after defeating Trinidad and Tobago in a two-legged playoff (with a 3-0 win at home and a 2-1 loss away, and a 4-2 win on aggregate). The team won 2-0 against Bolivia, but lost 2-1 in an upset by Panama and 1-0 against Uruguay, leading the US to becoming the first host country in the history of the competition to be knocked out in the group stage.

== Record at the Copa América ==
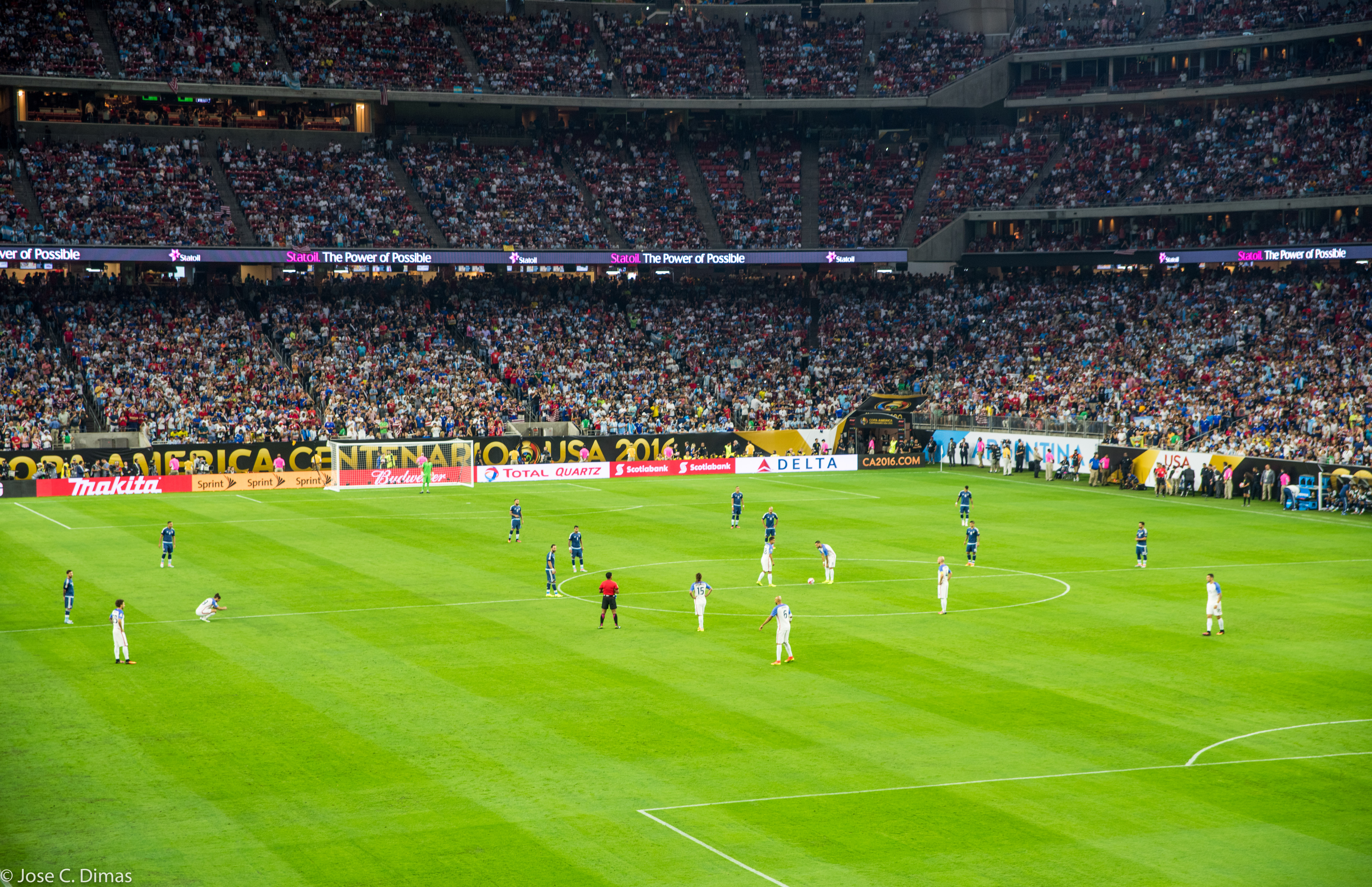
Kick-off for the semifinal against Argentina at the NRG Stadium in Houston during the United States' home tournament in 2016.

Copa América record
Year	Result	Position	Pld	W	D*	L	GF	GA
1916–1991	Not invited							
(Ecuador) 1993	Group stage	12th	3	0	1	2	3	6
(Uruguay) 1995	Fourth place	4th	6	2	1	3	6	7
1997–2004	Not invited							
(Venezuela) 2007	Group stage	12th	3	0	0	3	2	8
2011–2015	Not invited							
(United States) 2016	Fourth place	4th	6	3	0	3	7	8
2019–2021	Not invited							
(United States) 2024	Group stage	11th	3	1	0	2	3	3
Total	Invitation	0 titles	21	6	2	13	21	32

* Draws include matches decided via penalty shoot-out.

== Match overview ==
Tournament	Round	Opponent	Score	Venue
(Ecuador) 1993	Group stage	Uruguay	0–1	Ambato
(Ecuador) 1993	Group stage	Ecuador	0–2	Quito
(Ecuador) 1993	Group stage	Venezuela	3–3	Quito
(Uruguay) 1995	Group stage	Chile	2–1	Paysandú
(Uruguay) 1995	Group stage	Bolivia	0–1	Paysandú
(Uruguay) 1995	Group stage	Argentina	3–0	Paysandú
(Uruguay) 1995	Quarterfinals	Mexico	0–0 (4–1 p)	Paysandú
(Uruguay) 1995	Semifinals	Brazil	0–1	Maldonado
(Uruguay) 1995	Third place match	Colombia	1–4	Maldonado
(Venezuela) 2007	Group stage	Argentina	1–4	Maracaibo
(Venezuela) 2007	Group stage	Paraguay	1–3	Barinas
(Venezuela) 2007	Group stage	Colombia	0–1	Barquisimeto
(United States) 2016	Group stage	Colombia	0–2	Santa Clara
(United States) 2016	Group stage	Costa Rica	4–0	Chicago
(United States) 2016	Group stage	Paraguay	1–0	Philadelphia
(United States) 2016	Quarterfinals	Ecuador	2–1	Seattle
(United States) 2016	Semifinals	Argentina	0–4	Houston
(United States) 2016	Third place match	Colombia	0–1	Glendale
(United States) 2024	Group stage	Bolivia	2–0	Arlington
(United States) 2024	Group stage	Panama	1–2	Atlanta
(United States) 2024	Group stage	Uruguay	0–1	Kansas City

== Record players ==
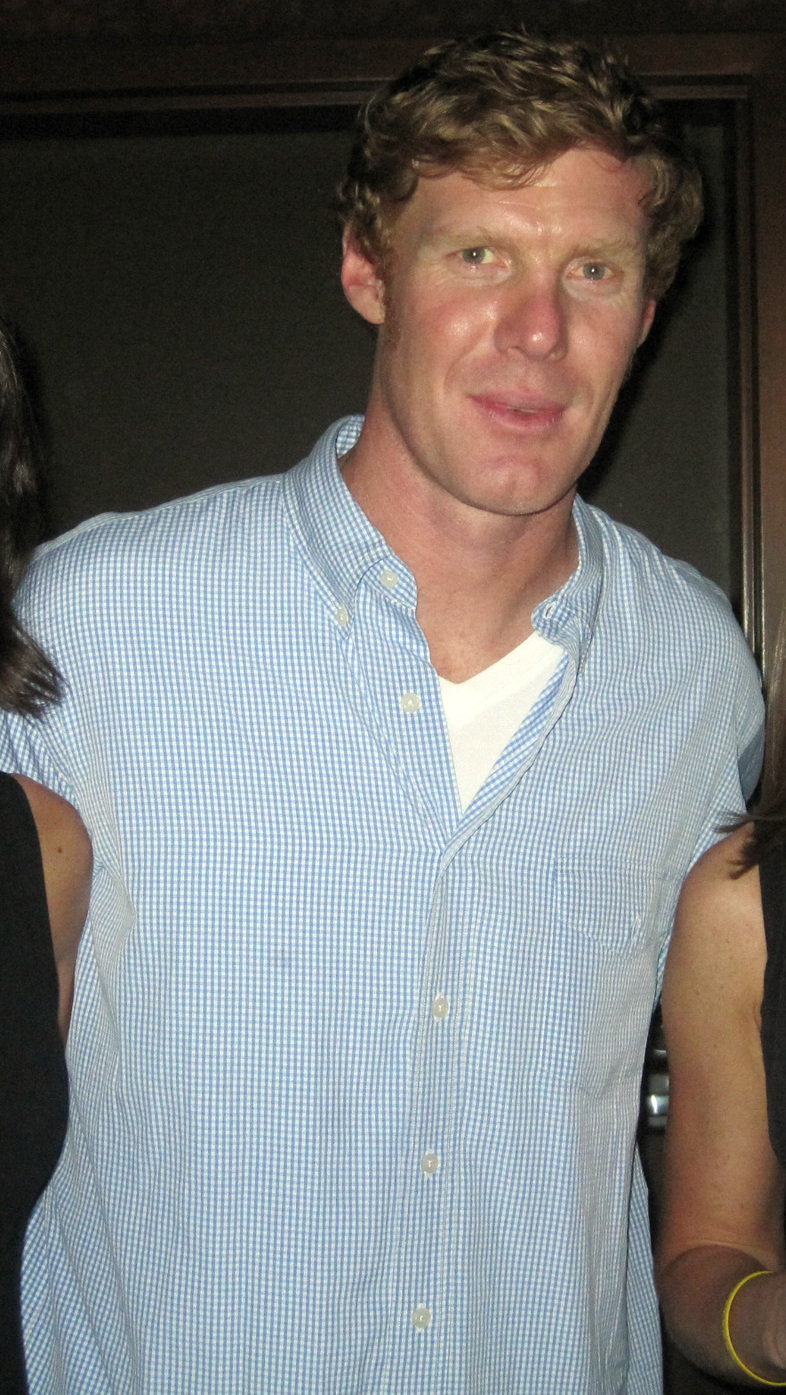
Alexi Lalas is the only American to score in two separate Copa América tournaments, and one of three players to appear in all nine matches in 1993 and 1995.

Rank	Player	Matches	Tournaments
1	Cobi Jones	9	1993 and 1995
1	Alexi Lalas	9	1993 and 1995
1	Tab Ramos	9	1993 and 1995
4	Paul Caligiuri	8	1993 and 1995
5	Brad Friedel	6	1993 and 1995
5	Mike Burns	6	1995
5	Earnie Stewart	6	1995
5	Kyle Beckerman	6	2007 and 2016
5	Brad Guzan	6	2007 and 2016
5	Michael Bradley	6	2016
5	Geoff Cameron	6	2016
5	Clint Dempsey	6	2016
5	Gyasi Zardes	6	2016
5	Christian Pulisic	6	2016 and 2024

== Top goalscorers ==
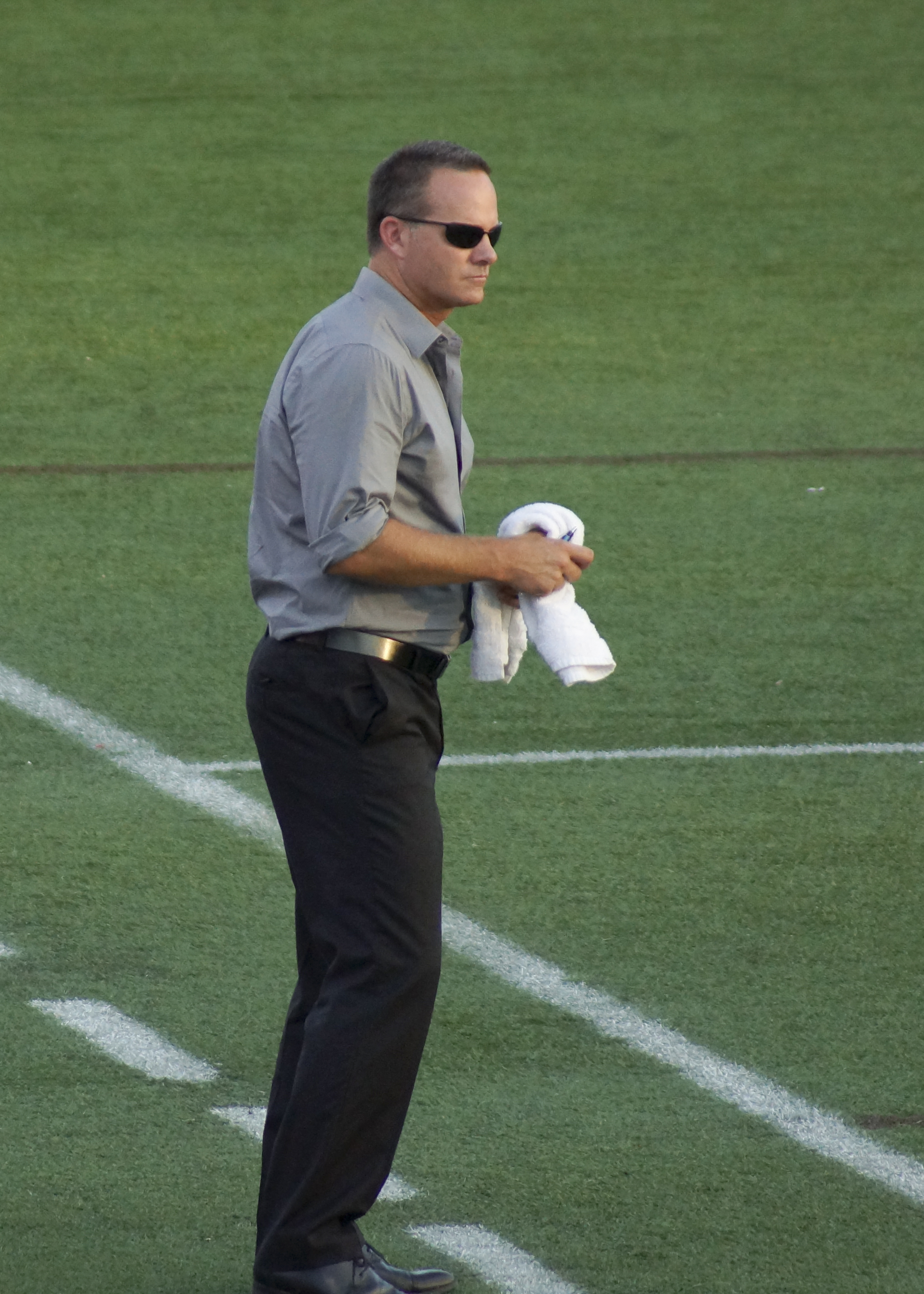
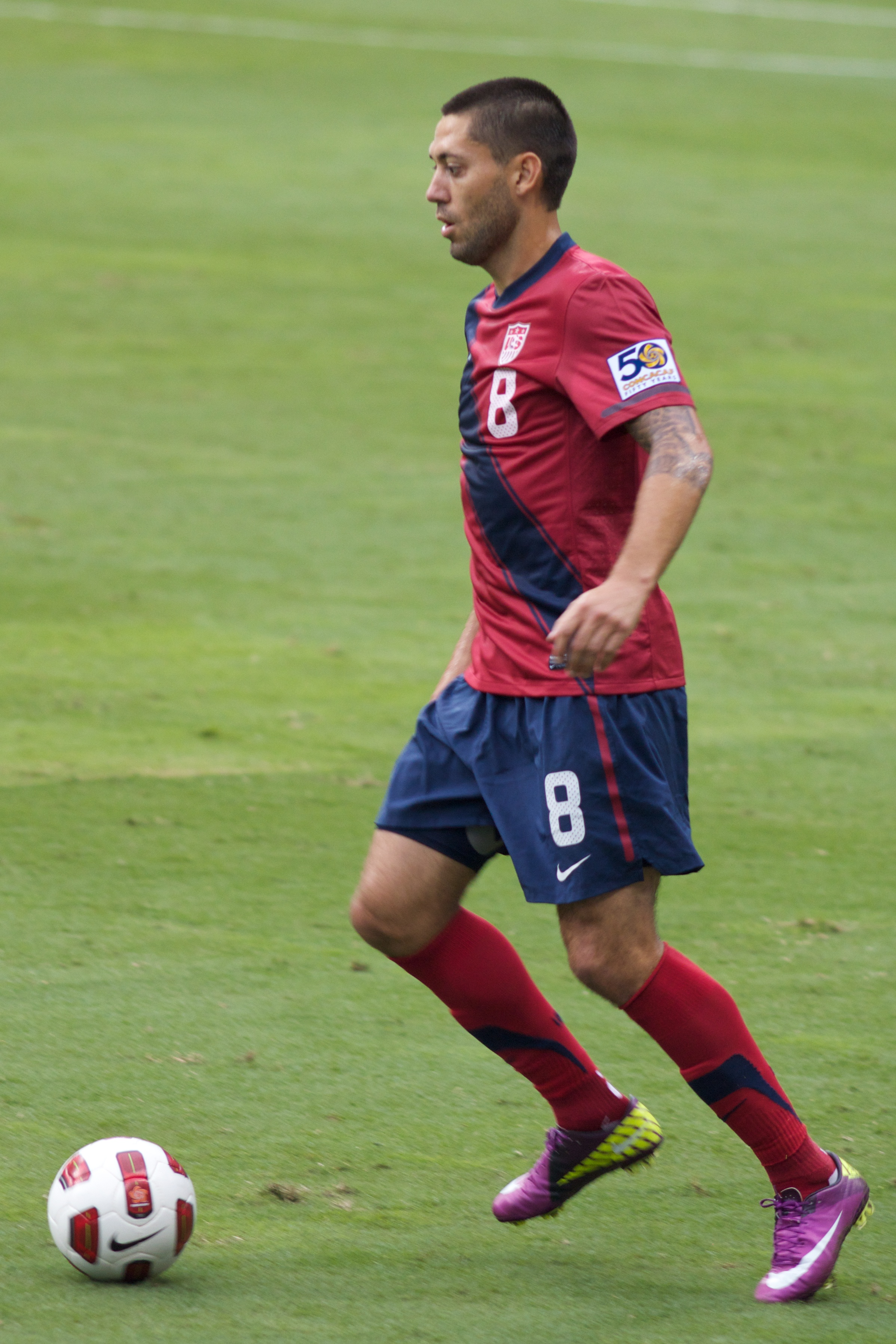
Eric Wynalda and Clint Dempsey scored three goals each at the 1995 and 2016 tournaments respectively.

Rank	Player	Goals	Tournaments
1	Eric Wynalda	3	1995
1	Clint Dempsey	3	2016
3	Alexi Lalas	2	1993 (1) and 1995 (1)
3	Folarin Balogun	2	2024
5	Eleven players	1	

== See also ==
- United States at the CONCACAF Gold Cup
- United States at the FIFA Confederations Cup
- United States at the FIFA World Cup

== Head-to-head record ==
Opponent	Pld	W	D	L	GF	GA	GD	Win %
Argentina	3	1	0	2	4	8	−4	33.33
Bolivia	2	1	0	1	2	1	+1	50.00
Brazil	1	0	0	1	0	1	−1	0.00
Chile	1	1	0	0	2	1	+1	100.00
Colombia	4	0	0	4	1	8	−7	0.00
Costa Rica	1	1	0	0	4	0	+4	100.00
Ecuador	2	1	0	1	2	3	−1	50.00
Mexico	1	0	1	0	0	0	+0	0.00
Paraguay	2	1	0	1	2	3	−1	50.00
Panama	1	0	0	1	1	2	−1	0.00
Uruguay	2	0	0	2	0	2	−2	0.00
Venezuela	1	0	1	0	3	3	+0	0.00
Total	21	6	2	13	21	32	−11	28.57
