= Abdul Chiari =

Panamanian football player (1971–2011)

Personal information
- Full name: Abdul Enrique Chiari Catuy
- Date of birth: 13 January 1971
- Place of birth: Colón, Panama
- Date of death: 15 July 2011 (aged 40)
- Place of death: Colón, Panama
- Position: Forward

Senior career*
Years	Team	Apps	(Gls)
1992–1994	Sporting Colón		
1994–2003	Árabe Unido		

International career^{‡}
1992–2000	Panama	8	(0)
- * Club domestic league appearances and goals ‡ National team caps and goals as of 6 March 2014

Abdul Enrique Chiari Catuy (13 January 1971 – 15 July 2011) was a Panamanian football striker.

== Club career ==
Nicknamed el Turco, Chiari played for local sides Sporting Colón and Árabe Unido, with whom he won 4 league titles. At the time of his death he was assistant coach at the club.

== International career ==
He made his debut for Panama in a June 1992 friendly match against Honduras and earned 8 caps, scoring no goals. He has represented his country at the 1995 UNCAF Nations Cup.

His final international was a June 2000 friendly match against Ecuador.

== Murder ==
In July 2011, Chiari was shot in front of the Estadio Armando Dely Valdés. He left his wife and seven children. He was buried at the Monte Esperanza cemetery.
