= Kieran Barton =

English-American soccer player and coach (born 1971)

Personal information
- Date of birth: March 28, 1971 (age 55)
- Place of birth: Carlisle, Cumberland, England
- Height: 5 ft 10 in (1.78 m)
- Positions: Defender; midfielder

Youth career
- 1989–1993: Whitworth College

Senior career*
Years	Team	Apps	(Gls)
1994–1995	Seattle Sounders		
1996	Spokane Shadow		
1997	Seattle Sounders	14	(1)
1998	Spokane Shadow		
1999–2002	Seattle Sounders	95	(2)
2003–2005	Spokane Shadow	20	(2)

Managerial career
- 2002–2006: Gonzaga Bulldogs (assistant)
- 2004: Spokane Shadow (assistant)
- 2005: Spokane Shadow
- * Club domestic league appearances and goals

Kieran Barton is an English-American retired soccer player who played professionally in the USL A-League.

== Player ==
Barton, son of English footballer Frank Barton, went to the United States in 1979 when his father signed with the Seattle Sounders of the North American Soccer League. Frank Barton remained in the United States after his retirement from professional football and Kieran Barton graduated from Mount Si High School in Snoqualmie, Washington. He attended Whitworth College in Spokane, Washington, playing on the men's soccer team from 1989 to 1993. He graduated in 1993 with bachelor's degree in biology.

In 1994, Barton turned professional with the Seattle Sounders of the American Professional Soccer League. In 1995, he again played for the Sounders as they won the league championship. In 1996, Barton moved to the Spokane Shadow of the USISL Premier League, beginning a pattern of alternating between the Sounders and the Shadow. In 1997, Barton returned to the Sounders only to turn around and return to the Shadow in 1998. In 1999, Barton again signed with the Sounders, this time for the next four seasons. In 2003, Barton again joined the Spokane Shadow where he finished his playing career in 2005.

== Coach ==
In 2002, Barton became an assistant coach with the Gonzaga University women's team, a position he held until 2007. In 2004, he also became an assistant with the Spokane Shadow. In April 2005, he was elevated the position of head coach of the Shadow.
