= Mike Gailey =

American soccer player

Personal information
- Full name: Michael Gailey, Jr.
- Date of birth: July 5, 1970 (age 56)
- Place of birth: United States
- Height: 5 ft 8 in (1.73 m)
- Position: Forward

College career
Years	Team	Apps	(Gls)
1988–1991	UNC Greensboro Spartans		

Senior career*
Years	Team	Apps	(Gls)
1993–1996	Greensboro Dynamo	87	(48)
1993–1994	Milwaukee Wave (indoor)	39	(14)
1995–1997	Tampa Bay Terror (indoor)	78	(59)
1997	Seattle Sounders	27	(10)
1997–1998	Buffalo Blizzard (indoor)	21	(10)
1998	Charleston Battery	9	(1)
1999	Atlanta Silverbacks	15	(0)
Total		138	(59)
- * Club domestic league appearances and goals

Mike Gailey is an American retired soccer player. He played professionally in the National Professional Soccer League and USISL.

== Youth ==
In 1988, Gailey graduated from Grimsley High School. He attended the University of North Carolina Greensboro, playing on the men's soccer team from 1988 to 1991. He led the NCAA Division I in scoring in 1991.

== Professional ==
In the spring of 1993, Gailey turned professional with the Greensboro Dynamo of the USISL. He would play for the Dynamo for four summer seasons. In 1993, he was a Sizzlin’ Six All Star. On November 5, 1993, Gailey signed with the Milwaukee Wave of the National Professional Soccer League. He was named to the NPSL All Rookie Third Team. In 1995, Gailey joined the Tampa Bay Terror where he played for the next two NPSL seasons. In 1997, he played for the Seattle Sounders of the USISL A-League. He was Second Team All League that season. Gailey then spent the 1997–1998 indoor season with the Buffalo Blizzard before signing with the Charleston Battery in 1998. After nine games, he moved to the Raleigh Flyers. Gailey finished his career with the Atlanta Silverbacks in 1999.
