= Neil Megson (soccer) =

Soccer player and coach (born 1962)

Personal information
- Date of birth: 27 July 1962 (age 64)
- Place of birth: Manchester, England
- Height: 6 ft 1 in (1.85 m)
- Position: Midfielder

Youth career
- 1976–1977: Bristol Rovers

Senior career*
| Years | Team | Apps | (Gls) |
| 1983 | Seattle Sounders | 14 | (1) |
| 1984 | Tulsa Roughnecks | 0 | (0) |
| 1983–1992 | Tacoma Stars (indoor) | 297 | (52) |
| 1988 | Calgary Kickers | 4 | (0) |
| 1993 | Portland Pride (indoor) | | (0) |
| 1994–1999 | Seattle Sounders | 98 | (4) |

International career
| 1988 | United States | 2 | (0) |

Managerial career
- 1993: Portland Pride (assistant)
- 1994–1995: Seattle Sounders (assistant)
- 1996–2000: Seattle Sounders
- 2003–2004: Olympic Rangers
- 2007–: Sounders Crossfire (assistant)
- * Club domestic league appearances and goals

Neil Megson (born 27 July 1962) is a soccer coach and former player who coaches youth soccer. A midfielder, he played two seasons in the North American Soccer League, nine in Major Indoor Soccer League, one in the Continental Indoor Soccer League and six in the USL First Division and its predecessors. He served as head coach to the Seattle Sounders for five seasons, winning the 1995 A-League championship and being named the 2000 USL Coach of the Year. Born in England, he earned two caps with the U.S. national team in 1988. He is the brother of former West Bromwich Albion and Sheffield Wednesday manager Gary Megson.

== Playing career ==
=== Youth ===
Megson was born in Manchester, England. His father, Don, played for English clubs Sheffield Wednesday and Bristol Rovers from 1959 to 1972. He then coached the Rovers for five years before moving to the United States to coach the Portland Timbers of the North American Soccer League (NASL) in 1977. Megson played with the Frampton Rangers Youth Academy before joining Bristol Rovers F.C. as an apprentice when he was fourteen. He was sixteen when his father moved their family to Portland. On arriving in Oregon, Megson attended Lake Oswego High School, becoming an outstanding prep player. He was named the Oregon Player of the Year his senior year. Megson's family returned to England, but he elected to remain in the U.S. After high school, he attended a local community college for a year.

=== Professional ===
In 1983, the Seattle Sounders of the NASL signed Megson. He saw time in fourteen games, but the Sounders folded at the end of the 1983 season and Megson moved to the Tulsa Roughnecks for the 1984 NASL season. The Roughnecks and the NASL folded at the end of the season. By the time the NASL had folded, Megson was firmly established as an indoor player with the Tacoma Stars of Major Indoor Soccer League (MISL). He had signed with the Stars as the team's first player in the summer of 1983 and had played his first season in Tacoma during the 1983–84 NASL off season. He remained with the Stars until the team folded at the end of the 1991–92 season. In 1988, he had played with the Calgary Kickers. Following the collapse of the Stars, Megson played a single season with the Portland Pride of the Continental Indoor Soccer League in 1993. In 1994, a new Seattle Sounders team was formed, this time in the American Professional Soccer League (APSL). Megson signed with the team as a free agent in March 1994 and spent most of his years with the team playing sweeper. In 1995, the Sounders won the A-League championship. In March 1996, Megson took on the duties of coach, as well as player, with the Sounders. In that role, he led the team to the 1996 A-League title. In August and then again in October of that year, he suffered several injuries which put him out of play for several months. Megson continued to play with the team through the 1998 season. In 1999, he became the team's dedicated coach.

=== International ===
Megson earned his first of two caps with the U.S. national team in a 1–1 tie with Chile on 1 June 1988. He came on for Bernie James who replaced Megson as head coach of the Sounders after Megson was fired. Megson's second cap came two days later in a 3–1 loss to Chile. He started the game, then came off for Chris Sullivan.

== Coaching career ==
While playing with the Portland Pride in 1993, Megson also served as an assistant coach. When he moved to the Sounders in 1994, he served as both an assistant coach and player under Alan Hinton. On 3 March 1996, the Sounders elevated Megson from player to player-coach after the team fired Hinton. On 28 September 2000 he was named the USL A-League Coach of the Year.

In 2003, Olympic College hired Megson to establish the school's men's and women's soccer teams. He coached the women's team's first season in 2004. In 2004, he became the Coaching Director of the WestSound Football Club and remained with the club through July 2007. In 2007, Megson rejoined the Sounders club as an assistant with the Sounders Crossfire W-League team. He coached several Franklin Pierce Fury teams in Tacoma, Washington. Since 2022 he has coached premier youth teams with Valor Soccer out of Maple Valley, WA.

== Non soccer ventures ==
Over the years, Megson has owned at least two Baskin-Robbins ice cream stores and a hair salon.

== See also ==
- List of United States men's international soccer players born outside the United States
