= Jovan Kirovski =

American soccer player (born 1976)

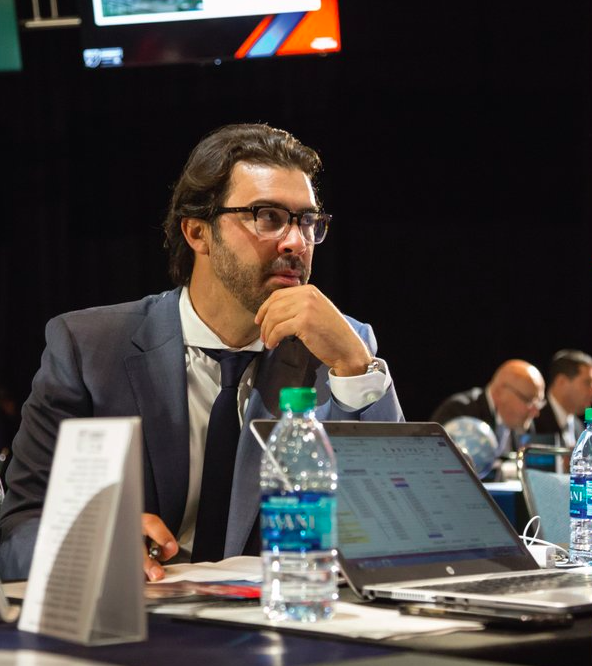
- Kirovski with LA Galaxy at the MLS SuperDraft in 2017

Personal information
- Full name: Jovan Kirovski
- Date of birth: March 18, 1976 (age 50)
- Place of birth: Escondido, California, United States
- Height: 6 ft 1 in (1.85 m)
- Position: Forward

Team information
- Current team: Milan Futuro (sporting director)

Youth career
- 1991: San Diego Nomads
- 1992: Manchester United

Senior career*
Years	Team	Apps	(Gls)
1993–1996	Manchester United	0	(0)
1996–2000	Borussia Dortmund	20	(1)
1998–1999	→ Fortuna Köln (loan)	23	(2)
2000–2001	Sporting CP	5	(0)
2001–2002	Crystal Palace	36	(5)
2002–2004	Birmingham City	23	(2)
2004–2005	Los Angeles Galaxy	48	(12)
2005–2008	Colorado Rapids	61	(12)
2008	San Jose Earthquakes	9	(0)
2009–2011	Los Angeles Galaxy	56	(6)
Total		281	(40)

International career
1996	United States U23	3	(1)
1994–2004	United States	62	(9)

Managerial career
- 2012: Los Angeles Galaxy (assistant)
- 2013: Los Angeles Galaxy (technical director)
- 2024–: AC Milan (director of sports development)
- 2026–: Milan Futuro (sporting director)
Medal record
Representing United States
Third place	CONCACAF Gold Cup	1996
Men's Soccer
- * Club domestic league appearances and goals

Jovan Kirovski (Macedonian: Јован Кировски; born March 18, 1976) is an American former soccer player who is the sporting director for the Milan Futuro (AC Milan's reserve team) in Serie D. Kirovski is the first American to win the UEFA Champions League (with Borussia Dortmund although he did not play in the final) and the first to score in a Champions League match. He has won an MLS Cup championship as a player, assistant coach, and technical director.

== Club career ==
Born in Escondido, California, Kirovski, is the son of Macedonian immigrants. In the 1990's at age of 14 Kirovski visited Yugoslavia for a trial with Croatian club Hajduk Split, but due to the uncertain political situation at that time his parents decided to return to the United States. In 1991-92 season as a sophomore he led San Pasqual High Golden Eagles to the San Diego County title. He was also a member of the San Diego Nomads from 1991.

While on a tour in 1992 with the U.S. Western Region Olympic Development Squad in United Kingdom, Kirovski impressed Manchester United youth coach Steve Kelly. Kelly arranged for Kirovski to be a guest player for Glasgow Rangers in the upcoming Milk Cup, an international football youth tournament held annually in Northern Ireland. Kirovski excelled in the tournament, scoring seven goals in seven games, including the match-winner in the semifinals, and helping the team win the tournament. He joined Manchester United's youth team in 1992, becoming the first American-born player to sign with the club. He led the reserve team in scoring in 1996, but was not able to break into the first team because of work permit regulations. After that season, he signed with Borussia Dortmund in the German Bundesliga. Kirovski spent the next four seasons in Germany. He played in Dortmund's 1996–97 UEFA Champions League campaign, becoming the first American to win the competition. He earned significant playing time during the 1998–99 season, when Borussia loaned him out to second division club Fortuna Köln.

In 2000, Kirovski signed with Portuguese club Sporting CP. After a season there, he went back to England, signing with Football League First Division club Crystal Palace. In 2002, Kirovski signed with Birmingham City, but after one and a half seasons, he signed with the Los Angeles Galaxy.

In his first season in MLS, Kirovski scored eight goals. In 2005, the Galaxy traded him to the Colorado Rapids for a first round pick in the 2007 MLS SuperDraft. After spending the 2008 season with the San Jose Earthquakes, he rejoined the Galaxy in a November 2008 trade. Kirovski enjoyed a successful stint with the Galaxy, winning an MLS Cup in 2011 with the club. On January 23, 2012, Kirovski retired from soccer but remained on the coaching staff for the LA Galaxy as an assistant coach. A member of Bruce Arena's coaching staff, Kirovski helped the team repeat as MLS Cup champions in 2012.

Kirovski was appointed by the LA Galaxy as the club's technical director on January 10, 2013. As Technical Director, Kirovski was instrumental in the creation of the club's USL affiliate LA Galaxy II, which was established in January 2014. Kirovski served as the point man in the Galaxy's pursuit and eventual signing of Mexican forward Giovani dos Santos in August 2015. He also aided the Galaxy in their signing of Jelle Van Damme a year later. Kirovski served as the lead in the Galaxy's signing of 2017 team Most Valuable Player Romain Alessandrini, as well as the addition of Mexican international Jonathan dos Santos in the same year. Kiroski led the team's pursuit of Swedish soccer legend Zlatan Ibrahimović, who joined the club officially in March 2018. Kirovski's rich global network from his time as a player helped to complete the deal.

== International career ==
Kirovski made his debut for the United States national team at the age of 18 on October 19, 1994, against Saudi Arabia, and played at the 1996 Olympics and the 1999 and 2003 editions of the FIFA Confederations Cup. Kirovski earned 62 caps in total with the US.

=== International goals ===
Scores and results list the United States' goal tally first, score column indicates score after each Kirovski goal.

List of international goals scored by Jovan Kirovski
No.	Date	Venue	Opponent	Score	Result	Competition
1	November 22, 1994	National Stadium, Kingston, Jamaica	Jamaica	1–0	3–0	Friendly
2	December 11, 1994	Titan Stadium, Fullerton, United States	Honduras	1–1	1–1	Friendly
3	January 21, 1996	Los Angeles Memorial Coliseum, Los Angeles, United States	Guatemala	3–0	3–0	1996 CONCACAF Gold Cup
4	June 17, 1997	Alltel Stadium, Jacksonville, United States	Israel	2–0	2–1	Friendly
5	February 6, 1999	Alltel Stadium, Jacksonville, United States	Germany	1–0	3–0	Friendly
6	July 24, 1999	Estadio Jalisco, Guadalajara, Jalisco, Mexico	New Zealand	2–0	2–1	1999 FIFA Confederations Cup
7	February 12, 2000	Orange Bowl, Miami, United States	Haiti	1–0	3–0	2000 CONCACAF Gold Cup
8	March 29, 2003	Seattle Seahawks Stadium, Seattle, United States	Venezuela	1–0	2–0	Friendly
9	June 8, 2003	University of Richmond Stadium, Richmond, United States	New Zealand	2–1	2–1	Friendly

== Coaching career ==
Kirovski joined Los Angeles Galaxy as assistant coach immediately upon his retirement in January 2012. In January 2013, the Galaxy appointed him as the club's technical director. In June 2024, Kirovski joined AC Milan as Director of Sports Development to be in charge of Milan’s Academy, including Milan Futuro, the Rossoneri’s second team.

== Honors ==
Borussia Dortmund

- UEFA Champions League: 1996–97
- Intercontinental Cup: 1997

Sporting

- Supertaça Cândido de Oliveira: 2000

Los Angeles Galaxy

- MLS Cup: 2005, 2011
- Lamar Hunt U.S. Open Cup: 2005
- Western Conference: 2005, 2009, 2010, 2011
