= 1995 USISL Pro League =

USISL Pro League
- Season: 1995
- Champions: Long Island Rough Riders (1st Title)
- Regular Season title: Minnesota Thunder (1st Title)
- Matches: 550
- Goals: 2,630 (4.78 per match)
- Best Player: (Venezuela) Giovanni Savarese Long Island Rough Riders
- Top goalscorer: (Brazil) Flávio Ferri San Antonio Pumas (29 Goals)
- Best goalkeeper: (United States) Jim Adams Columbus Xoggs

The 1995 USISL Professional League was the higher of the two outdoor men's leagues run by the United Systems of Independent Soccer Leagues during the summer of 1995.

== Overview ==
From its beginnings in 1986 as a semi-professional indoor league in the American Southwest, the USISL had grown over the last decade. In 1989, the league added a summer, outdoor competition which had grown in popularity as the indoor league slowly shrank. By 1994, the outdoor season included 69 teams with various levels of professionalism. In 1995, the USISL decided to split the summer schedule into two different leagues, the Professional and the Premier Leagues. The Professional League was fully professional while the Premier League continued to allow amateur and semi-professional teams to compete.

== Regular season ==
- Regulation win = 6 points
- Shootout win (SW) = 4 points
- Shootout loss (SL) = 2 points
- Regulation loss = 0 points
- Bonus points (BP): An additional one point per goal up to a maximum of three points per game.

=== Northeast Division ===
==== Coastal Conference ====
Pos	Team	Pld	W	SW	SL	L	GF	GA	GD	BP	Pts
1	Long Island Rough Riders	20	18	1	0	1	69	20	+49	45	157
2	Delaware Wizards	20	16	0	0	4	47	22	+25	41	137
3	Jersey Dragons	20	11	1	1	7	48	32	+16	39	111
4	Cape Cod Crusaders	20	11	0	2	7	49	33	+16	35	105
5	Rhode Island Stingrays	20	4	1	2	13	30	56	−26	28	60
6	Baltimore Bays	20	3	1	0	16	29	64	−35	28	50

==== Capital Conference ====
Pos	Team	Pld	W	SW	SL	L	GF	GA	GD	BP	Pts
1	New York Fever	20	13	2	0	5	43	22	+21	38	124
2	North Jersey Imperials	20	13	0	1	6	63	35	+28	43	123 (Note: Bonus points adjusted from 47 to 43?)
3	Pennsylvania Freedom	20	11	1	1	7	55	44	+11	44	116
4	Albany Alleycats	20	9	0	1	10	48	51	−3	41	97
5	New Hampshire Ramblers	20	9	1	1	9	42	32	+10	35	95
6	Connecticut Wolves	20	8	0	1	11	35	53	−18	29	79
7	Boston Storm	20	3	0	0	17	25	62	−37	24	42

=== Atlantic Division ===
Pos	Team	Pld	W	SW	SL	L	GF	GA	GD	BP	Pts
1	Charleston Battery	20	16	1	1	2	58	16	+42	44	146
2	Charlotte Eagles	20	13	1	0	6	59	35	+24	45	127
3	Raleigh Flyers	20	13	1	1	5	49	32	+17	42	126
4	Myrtle Beach Boyz	20	13	0	1	6	51	36	+15	39	119
5	Hampton Roads Mariners	20	12	1	1	6	51	31	+20	41	119
6	Greensboro Dynamo	20	11	0	0	9	55	33	+22	45	111 (Note: Bonus points adjusted from 43 to 45?)

=== Midwest Division ===
==== East Conference ====
Pos	Team	Pld	W	SW	SL	L	GF	GA	GD	BP	Pts
1	Minnesota Thunder	20	19	0	0	1	72	15	+57	49	163
2	Chicago Stingers	20	11	0	0	9	49	46	+3	39	105
3	St. Louis Knights	20	9	2	0	9	43	42	+1	34	96
4	Cincinnati Cheetahs	20	5	0	2	13	36	50	−14	33	67
5	Detroit Wheels	20	2	0	1	17	25	66	−41	15	29 (Note: Bonus points adjusted from 24 to 15?)

==== West Conference ====
Pos	Team	Pld	W	SW	SL	L	GF	GA	GD	BP	Pts
1	Milwaukee Rampage	20	17	0	0	3	63	24	+39	45	147
2	Columbus Xoggz	20	16	1	0	3	62	19	+43	46	146
3	Louisville Thoroughbreds	20	10	1	1	8	50	44	+6	41	107
4	Lexington Bluegrass Bandits	20	7	2	0	11	42	52	−10	39	89
5	Rockford Raptors	20	8	0	1	11	36	36	0	28	78

=== Southeast Division ===
Pos	Team	Pld	W	SW	SL	L	GF	GA	GD	BP	Pts
1	Tampa Bay Cyclones	20	16	1	0	3	70	25	+45	47	147
2	Mobile Revelers	20	13	0	2	5	39	21	+18	34	116
3	Chattanooga Railroaders	20	9	1	0	10	50	51	−1	40	98
4	Fort Lauderdale Strikers	20	7	1	0	12	36	56	−20	32	78
5	Florida Stars	20	8	0	1	11	36	56	−20	26	76

=== South Central Division ===
Pos	Team	Pld	W	SW	SL	L	GF	GA	GD	BP	Pts
1	El Paso Patriots	20	15	0	0	5	67	38	+29	51	141
2	DFW Toros	20	13	0	2	5	62	40	+22	44	126
3	New Mexico Chiles	20	13	0	0	7	54	31	+23	42	120
4	San Antonio Pumas	20	12	1	0	7	69	46	+23	44	120
5	New Orleans Riverboat Gamblers	20	11	1	2	6	41	33	+8	39	113
6	Texas Lightning	20	7	0	0	13	37	65	−28	33	75
7	Tulsa Roughnecks	20	5	1	1	13	32	45	−13	31	67

=== Western Division ===
==== North Conference ====
Pos	Team	Pld	W	SW	SL	L	GF	GA	GD	BP	Pts
1	Monterey Bay Jaguars	20	14	2	0	4	60	24	+36	46	138
2	Chico Rooks	20	14	0	1	5	58	34	+24	45	131
3	Reno Rattlers	20	12	1	1	6	44	23	+21	37	115
4	CCV Hydra	20	9	0	1	10	42	36	+6	34	90
5	San Francisco Bay Diablos	20	6	0	3	11	43	49	−6	34	76

==== South Conference ====
Pos	Team	Pld	W	SW	SL	L	GF	GA	GD	BP	Pts
1	Los Angeles Salsa U-23s	20	15	0	0	5	63	34	+29	47	137
2	San Diego Top Guns	20	11	2	0	7	47	32	+15	41	115
3	Valley Golden Eagles	20	11	0	2	7	41	31	+10	34	104
4	Las Vegas Quicksilver	20	3	0	0	17	22	55	−33	22	40

=== Northwest Division ===
Pos	Team	Pld	W	SW	SL	L	GF	GA	GD	BP	Pts
1	Hawaii Tsunami	20	17	1	0	2	69	15	+54	48	154
2	Salem Surge	20	14	0	0	6	61	37	+24	47	131
3	Everett Bigfoot	20	11	1	0	8	38	36	+2	32	102
4	Portland Firebirds	20	9	0	3	8	36	30	+6	31	91
5	Yakima Reds	20	4	0	0	16	29	60	−31	27	51

== Playoffs ==
=== Northeast Division ===
==== First round ====
August 9, 1995
8:00 PM EST

Pennsylvania Freedom (PA)	0-1	Jersey Dragons (NJ)

United German-Hungarian Club, Oakford, Pennsylvania

August 9, 1995

North Jersey Imperials (NJ)	1-4	Cape Cod Crusaders (MA)
Duane Robinson (49:06)	Report	(9:42) Ron Murphy; (28:03) Jeff Doyle; (46:57) Stu McRury

Don Ahern Veteran's Memorial Stadium, Bayonne, New Jersey
Referee: Noel Kenny

==== Second round ====
August 12 1995

Delaware Wizards (DE)	5–4 (SO)	Cape Cod Crusaders (WI)
Matt Ford (0:40), 3'; Chris Morgan; Gary Ross 86' (pen.)	Report 1 Report 2	Ron Murphy; 52' David Johnson; (80:57)
Penalties
Rob Smith (penalty scored); Gary Ross (penalty scored); Franklin McIntosh (penalty scored); Kevin Sloan (penalty scored); Omid Nazami (penalty missed); Chris Morgan (penalty scored)	5–4	Penalty scored Penalty missed

Hoffman Stadium, Newark, Delaware
Attendance: 3,074
- According to the available records, the Delaware Wizards defeated the Cape Cod Crusaders 5-4 (SO).

August 12, 1995
5:00 PM EST

New York Fever (NY)	1-0	Jersey Dragons (NJ)
Carlton Carter (21:58)	Report 1 Report 2

Westchester Community College, Valhalla, New York
Attendance: 973

==== Final ====
August 18, 1995
5:30 PM EST

New York Fever (NY)	1-0	Delaware Wizards (MA)
Mike Saunders 54'	Report 1

Westchester Community College, Valhalla, New York
Attendance: 725

August 20, 1995
5:00 PM EST

Delaware Wizards (MA)	0-2	New York Fever (NY)
	Report	11' Jim McElderry; 47' Ian Hennessy

Newark High School, Newark, Delaware
Attendance: 3,118

The New York Fever advanced.

=== Atlantic Division ===
August 11, 1995

Charlotte Eagles (NC)	0-2	Raleigh Flyers (NC)
	Report	15' Raimo de Vries; Randy Sheen

Charlotte, North Carolina
Attendance: 1,312

August 12, 1995

Charleston Battery (SC)	0-3	Myrtle Beach Boyz (SC)
	Report	(6:39) Chris Diaz; 45' Troy Edwards; 57' John Garvey

Stoney Field, Charleston, South Carolina
Attendance: 3,127

==== Final ====
August 17, 1995
7:30 PM EST

Myrtle Beach Boyz (SC)	1-6	Raleigh Flyers (NC)
Gabe Garcia 44'; John Garvey (yellow card)	Report	(15:22) Raimo de Vries; 35', 42' Alan Prampin; 39' Brian Hunter; 55', 58' Garth Pollonais

Doug Shaw Memorial Stadium, Myrtle Beach, South Carolina
Attendance: 1,000

August 19, 1995
7:00 PM EST

Raleigh Flyers (NC)	1-3	Myrtle Beach Boyz (SC)
Raimo de Vries (24:07)	Report	(0:49) Gabe Garcia; (12:19) Jimmy McGeough; (44:27) Carlos Garcia

Broughton High School, Raleigh, North Carolina

- The teams played a mini-game to decide who advanced after finishing the series tied at one game apiece.

August 19, 1995
10:00 PM EST

Raleigh Flyers (NC)	0-2	Myrtle Beach Boyz (SC)
	Report	(7:53) John Garvey

Broughton High School, Raleigh, North Carolina

The Myrtle Beach Boyz advanced.

=== Midwest Division ===
==== First round ====
August 8, 1995
7:30 PM CST

St. Louis Knights (MO)	1-2 OT	Chicago Stingers (IL)
Eric Puls 12'		11' 64:17' Matt Knowles

St. Louis Soccer Park, Fenton, Missouri

August 9, 1995
7:00 PM CST

Columbus Xoggz (OH)	1-1	Louisville Thoroughbreds (KY)
Marty Schafer 11'		48' Marty Schoering; (yellow card) (red card) 88' Louisville player #13

Xogg houZe, Dublin, Ohio

- The game was suspended late in the match due to darkness. On August 10th, the league announced the Xoggz and Thoroughbreds would finish their game on August 11th. The team which won would then immediately play the Milwaukee Rampage in the first game of the second round series. The Thoroughbreds, facing the requirement to make short-notice travel plans in order to play the last few minutes of the suspended game, then play their "home game" in Columbus in the event they won, chose to forfeit instead.

==== Second round ====
- The Midwest Division second round matchups featured two-game series. All other divisions had single elimination matchups.
August 12, 1995

Chicago Stingers (IL)	0-2	Minnesota Thunder (MN)
Steve Morris (penalty missed) PK	Report	55', 56' Tony Sanneh

Forest View Park; Arlington Heights, Illinois
Attendance: 1,096

August 13, 1995
7:30 PM CST

Minnesota Thunder (MN)	3-1	Chicago Stingers (IL)
Tony Sanneh; Don Gramenz; Gerard Lagos	Report	David Richardson

National Sports Center, Blaine, Minnesota
Attendance: 1,567

The Minnesota Thunder advanced to the Midwest Division final.

August 11, 1995
6:30 PM EST

Columbus Xoggz (OH)	1-1	Milwaukee Rampage (WI)
Damian Roden 33'	Report	31' Dan Stebbins
Penalties
Matt Coyer (penalty missed); Marty Schafer (penalty missed); Stephen Pugh (penalty missed); Lord (penalty missed)	0-2	(penalty missed) Kris Kelderman; (penalty scored) Steve Provan; (penalty missed) Rodrigo Gonzalez; (penalty scored) Dan Stebbins

Xogg houZe, Dublin, Ohio
Attendance: 1,503

August 13, 1995
3:00PM

Milwaukee Rampage (WI)	1-0	Columbus Xoggz (OH)
Jason Willan	Report

Uihlein Soccer Park, Milwaukee, Wisconsin
Attendance: 2,107

The Milwaukee Rampage advanced.

==== Final ====
August 18, 1995
5:30 PM CST

Milwaukee Rampage (WI)	2-0	Minnesota Thunder (MN)
Omar Dalombo 52'; Dan Stebbins 62'	Report

Uihlein Soccer Park, Milwaukee, Wisconsin
Attendance: 2,812

August 20, 1995
5:30 PM CST

Minnesota Thunder (MN)	3-2 OT	Milwaukee Rampage (WI)
Gerard Lagos; Magee	Report	Dan Stebbins

National Sports Center, Blaine, Minnesota
Attendance: 2,529

August 20, 1995

Minnesota Thunder (MN)	1-0	Milwaukee Rampage (WI)
Mario Lone (8:59)	Report

National Sports Center, Blaine, Minnesota
Attendance: 2,529

The Minnesota Thunder advanced.

=== Southeast Division ===
August 12, 1995
7:30 PM

Tampa Bay Cyclones (FL)	4-1	Fort Lauderdale Strikers (FL)
Rich Biondi (1:44); Adrian Bush (28:58); Mario Yepes 40'; Riquelme Caicedo	Report 1 Report 2	(red card) 11:30' Antonio De Rosa; 26' Waldir Barreto

USF Soccer Stadium, Tampa, Florida
Attendance: 1,400

August 12, 1995

Mobile Revelers (AL)	0-2	Chattanooga Railroaders (TN)
	Report

Attendance: 1,700

==== Final ====
August 19, 1995
7:30 PM PST

Tampa Bay Cyclones (FL)	3-1	Chattanooga Railroaders (TN)
Mario Yepes (13:23); Junior (16:15); Riquelme Caicedo (47:51)	Report 1 Report 2	(1:18) Caleb Suri

USF Soccer Stadium, Tampa, Florida
Attendance: 2,514

The Tampa Bay Cyclones advanced.

=== South Central Division ===
August 12, 1995

El Paso Patriots (TX)	3-2 OT	San Antonio Pumas (TX)
David Stewart (44:12); Steve Guardado (46:13); Cesar Sosa 62:46'	Report	(52:54) Flavio Ferri; (59:59) Alex Matturro

Dudley Field, El Paso, Texas
Attendance: 3,823

August 12, 1995

New Mexico Chiles (NM)	7-2	DFW Toros (TX)
Blaine LeGere (9:07); Richard Farrer 12'; Jeff Gregorio (45:47); Richie Louis; Mochtar Abukusumo	Report	Dmitriakov; Hernandez

Milne Stadium, Albuquerque, New Mexico
Attendance: 4,877

==== Final ====
August 17, 1995
7:30 PM MST

New Mexico Chiles (NM)	3-0	El Paso Patriots (TX)
Richard Farrer (18:03) (pen.); Richie Louis 23' (pen.)	Report	(yellow card) (yellow-red card) Gabino Amparan

Wilson Stadium, Albuquerque, New Mexico
Attendance: 3,529

August 20, 1995
2:00 PM CST

El Paso Patriots (TX)	1-2	New Mexico Chiles (NM)
Rito Delgado (46:42)	Report 1 Report 2	21', 37' Richard Farrer

Dudley Field, El Paso, Texas
Attendance: 2,000

The New Mexico Chiles advanced to the Sizzlin' Nine Tournament.

=== Western Division ===
==== First round ====
August 9, 1995

Chico Rooks (CA)	1-2	Reno Rattlers (NV)
Scott Wulferdingen 15'	Report 1 Report 2	35' Thies Carstons; 51' Roberto Solano

Durham High School Stadium, Durham, California
Attendance: 2,215

==== Second round ====
August 12, 1995

Monterey Bay Jaguars (CA)	2-1	Reno Rattlers (NV)
Paul Bravo 13'; Randy Mann 60+6'		19' Thies Carstena

Carl Connelly Stadium, Aptos, California
Attendance: 900

August 12, 1995

Los Angeles Salsa U-23's (CA)	5-1	San Diego Top Guns (CA)
	Report

Attendance: 900

==== Final ====
August 19, 1995
7:30 PM PST

Los Angeles Salsa U-23's (CA)	2-3	Monterey Bay Jaguars (CA)
57'		45' Paul Bravo; 56' Randy Mann; 58' Rhett Harty

Mission Viejo High School, Mission Viejo, California
Attendance: 1,100

August 20, 1995
7:30 PM PST

Monterey Bay Jaguars (CA)	2-1 OT	Los Angeles Salsa U-23's (CA)
Jeff Baicher 51' (pen.); Ryan Collins 67'		48' Joe Flanagan

Carl Connelly Stadium, Aptos, California
Attendance: 1,000

The Monterey Bay Jaguars advanced.

=== Northwest Division ===
August 12, 1995

Cascade Surge (OR)	3-2	Everett BigFoot (WA)
Victor Sanhueza (21:50); Byron Alvarez (35:56)		(17:01) Craig Beeson; (49:48) Chris McDonald

McCulloch Stadium, Salem, Oregon
Attendance: 2,542 or 2,543 or 3,200
Referee: Tom Ward

==== Final ====
August 19, 1995
7:30 PST

Hawaii Tsunami (HI)	2-0	Cascade Surge (OR)
Peter Woodring 14' (24:47)

Aloha Stadium, Honolulu, Hawaii
Attendance: 4,500

The Hawaii Tsunami advanced.

== Sizzlin' Nine Championship ==
The Sizzlin' Nine Championship was a three-group round robin tournament featuring nine teams. The Long Island Rough Riders received a bye into the Sizzlin' Nine Championship. The other eight teams were the seven divisional champions and the divisional finals runner-up with the highest total points during the regular season. Each of the three groups played at a single location. The top four teams then advanced to the playoff semifinals.

=== Group 1 ===
Pos	Team	Pld	W	L	GF	GA	GD
1	Long Island Rough Riders	2	2	0	6	2	+4
2	Monterey Bay Jaguars	2	1	1	9	3	+6
3	New Mexico Chiles	2	0	2	2	12	−10

August 29, 1995
7:30 PM EST

Long Island Rough Riders (NY)	2-1	Monterey Bay Jaguars (CA)
Giovanni Savarese (46:47); Mike Masters (52:12)	Report	(26:16) Paul Bravo

Mitchel Park, Uniondale, New York
Attendance: 2,478
August 30, 1995
7:30 PM EST

Monterey Bay Jaguars (CA)	8-1	New Mexico Chiles (NM)
Paul Bravo 11'; Jeff Baicher; Curt Cox; Randy Mann; Chris Beeson 60'	Report	55' Blaine LeGere

Mitchel Park, Uniondale, New York
August 31, 1995
7:30 PM EST

Long Island Rough Riders (NY)	4-1	New Mexico Chiles (NM)
Giovanni Savarese; Cordt Weinstein	Report	Richie Louis

Mitchel Park, Uniondale, New York
Attendance: 2,681

=== Group 2 ===
Pos	Team	Pld	W	L	GF	GA	GD
1	Minnesota Thunder	2	2	0	4	1	+3
2	New York Fever	2	1	1	2	2	0
3	Hawaii Tsunami	2	0	2	0	3	−3

August 29, 1995
5:45 PM EST

New York Fever (NY)	1-0	Hawaii Tsunami (HI)
	Report
Penalties
Peter Vermes (penalty scored); John DeBrito (penalty scored)	2-0	(penalty missed) Billy Thompson; (penalty missed) Jerry Proctor; (penalty missed) Cris Gilmore; (penalty missed) Samuel Ekeme

Barrett Stadium, Valhalla, New York
Attendance: 992

- When the game ended in a tie, the referee chose to go directly to penalty kicks because the field had no lights and it was difficult to see.

August 30, 1995
5:45 PM EST

Minnesota Thunder (MN)	2-0	Hawaii Tsunami (HI)
Amos Magee (33:30); Tony Sanneh	Report

Barrett Stadium, Valhalla, New York
Attendance: 200
August 31, 1995
5:45 PM EST

New York Fever (NY)	2-1	Minnesota Thunder (MN)
Ian Hennessy 14'		25' Tony Sanneh
Penalties
Jim McElderry (penalty scored); Peter Vermes (penalty scored); John DeBrito (penalty scored)	3-4	(penalty scored) Tony Sanneh; (penalty scored) Don Gramenz; (penalty scored) Manny Lagos; (penalty scored) Matt Holmes

Barrett Stadium, Valhalla, New York

=== Group 3 ===
Pos	Team	Pld	W	L	GF	GA	GD
1	Tampa Bay Cyclones	2	1	1	7	6	+1
2	Myrtle Beach Boyz	2	1	1	7	7	0
3	Milwaukee Rampage	2	1	1	5	6	−1

August 28, 1995
7:00 PM EST

Myrtle Beach Boyz (SC)	3-5	Tampa Bay Cyclones (FL)
Carlos Garcia (8:01); David Mallick 34'; John Garvey (58:08)	Report 1 Report 2	(8:15), 53' Adrian Bush; (11:17) Andy Zorovich; (25:07) Eric Ravndal; (59:48) Riquelme Caicedo

Doug Shaw Memorial Stadium, Myrtle Beach, South Carolina
Attendance: 1,000
August 29, 1995
7:00 PM EST

Milwaukee Rampage (WI)	3-2	Tampa Bay Cyclones (FL)
Omar Dalombo 3'; Dan Stebbins 14'; Jason Willan 23'		27' Harold Ooft; 28' Riquelme Caicedo

Doug Shaw Memorial Stadium, Myrtle Beach, South Carolina
August 30, 1995
7:00 PM EST

Myrtle Beach Boyz (SC)	4-2	Milwaukee Rampage (WI)
Gerard Gregoire (12:30); John Garvey (31:20); Carlos Garcia (37:58), 46'	Report	28' (44:48) Omar Dalombo

Doug Shaw Memorial Stadium, Myrtle Beach, South Carolina
Attendance: 750

== Semi-finals ==
September 2, 1995
5:00 PM EST

Minnesota Thunder (MN)	3-2 OT	Myrtle Beach Boyz (SC)
Amos Magee (6:19); Manny Lagos (59:32); Don Gramenz 62:30'	Report	(16:19) John Garvey

Mitchel Park, Uniondale, New York

September 2, 1995
7:30 PM EST

Long Island Rough Riders (NY)	5-2	Tampa Bay Cyclones (FL)
Giovanni Savarese 12', 22', 25'; Kevin Anderson 43'; Cordt Weinstein 47'	Report	9', 41' Rich Biondi

Mitchel Park, Uniondale, New York
Attendance: 3,425

== Final ==
September 4, 1995
4:00 PM EST

Long Island Rough Riders (NY)	2-1	Minnesota Thunder (MN)
Chris Armas (29:16); Giovanni Savarese (59:54)	(Report) Report 2	33' Amos Magee

Mitchel Park, Uniondale, New York
Attendance: 4,118

== Points leaders ==
Rank	Scorer	Club	GP	Goals	Assists	Points
1	(Brazil) Flavio Ferri	San Antonio Pumas	19	29	8	66
2	(United States) Rito Delgado	El Paso Patriots	18	26	11	61
3	(Jamaica) Paul Young	Charleston Battery	19	23	9	55
4	(Venezuela) Giovanni Savarese	Long Island Rough Riders	20	23	8	54
5	(England) Darren Eales	Hampton Roads Mariners	19	24	4	52
6	(Bulgaria) Ivailo Ilarionov	Chattanooga Railroaders	15	18	14	50
7	(United States) Billy Thompson	Hawaii Tsunami	14	21	7	49
8	(United States) Duane Robinson	New Jersey Imperials	17	21	5	47
9	(United States) Manny Lagos	Minnesota Thunder	17	19	7	45
10	(United States) John van Buskirk	Louisville Thoroughbreds	19	21	3	44

== Honors ==
- MVP: (Venezuela) Giovanni Savarese
- Points leader: (Brazil) Flavio Ferri, San Antonio Pumas (66 points)
- Goals leader: (Brazil) Flavio Ferri, San Antonio Pumas (29 goals)
- Assists leader: (United States) Wayne Lobring, Louisville Thoroughbreds (18 assists)
- Defender of the Year: (United States) Troy Edwards
- Goalkeeper of the Year: (United States) Jim Adams
- Rookie of the Year: (Brazil) Wellijohn Dominiciano Jr.,
- Coach of the Year: (United States) Buzz Lagos
- Organization of the Year: Tampa Bay Cyclones
