= 1996 USISL Select League =

USISL Select League
- Season: 1996
- Teams: 21
- Champions: California Jaguars
- Premiers: Carolina Dynamo
- Matches: 189
- Goals: 611 (3.23 per match)
- Best Player: (United States) Dan Stebbins
- Top goalscorer: (United States) Dan Stebbins (21 goals)
- Best goalkeeper: (United States) Scott Garlick

The 1996 USISL Select League season was the first season of a professional men's soccer league which featured teams from the United States. The league shared Division II status in the American soccer pyramid with the A-League, before the two leagues merged in 1997 as the USISL A-League.

== History ==
The league had its origins in the United States Interregional Soccer League (USISL), which was the de facto second tier of American soccer during the early 1990s, and until 1995 confined itself to organising regional leagues.

The USISL Pro League, which had been at the third tier of the pyramid in 1995, split into two leagues in 1996; the best teams joined the new USISL Select League, while the remainder (plus expansion teams) remained in the USISL Pro League, which retained its Division III status. Both the A-League and the new USISL Select League had Division II status in 1996.

In an attempt to counteract the fact that a number of top A-League players had left to join MLS in 1995 and 1996 six of the seven remaining A-League teams – Montreal Impact, Colorado Foxes, Seattle Sounders, Rochester Raging Rhinos, Vancouver 86ers and Atlanta Ruckus, plus two planned A-League expansion teams (Toronto Lynx and Hershey Wildcats) merged with the USISL Select League to form a consolidated Division II league before the 1997 season. The resulting merged league retained the A-League name, and the USISL Select League name was abandoned.

=== USISL Select League teams ===
- California Jaguars
- Cape Cod Crusaders (now in PDL)
- Carolina Dynamo (joined A-League in 1997; now in PDL)
- Chicago Stingers
- Connecticut Wolves (joined A-League in 1997)
- Delaware Wizards
- El Paso Patriots (now in PDL)
- Hampton Roads Mariners
- Long Island Rough Riders (joined A-League in 1997; now in PDL)
- Milwaukee Rampage (joined A-League in 1997)
- Minnesota Thunder (joined A-League in 1997)
- New Mexico Chiles
- New Orleans Riverboat Gamblers (joined A-League in 1997)
- New York/New Jersey Stallions
- Ohio Xoggz
- Raleigh Flyers (joined A-League in 1997)
- Reno Rattlers
- Richmond Kickers (joined A-League in 1997; now in USL Pro)
- Sacramento Scorpions
- South Carolina Shamrocks
- Tampa Bay Cyclones (became Jacksonville Cyclones and joined A-League in 1997)

== Champions ==
- Regular Season: Carolina Dynamo (43 points, 14–3–1 record)
- Playoff Winners: California Jaguars (beat Richmond Kickers 2–1)

== Regular season ==
- Regulation win = 3 points
- Shootout win (SW) = 1 point
- Loss (regulation or shootout) = 0 points

=== Eastern Conference ===
==== North Atlantic Division ====
Pos	Team	Pld	W	SW	L	GF	GA	GD	Pts
1	Long Island Rough Riders	18	11	0	7	39	31	+8	33
2	Richmond Kickers	18	10	0	8	34	24	+10	28
3	Connecticut Wolves	18	7	4	7	37	37	0	25
4	Delaware Wizards	18	5	1	12	20	29	−9	16
5	Cape Cod Crusaders	18	4	1	13	13	24	−11	9
6	New York/New Jersey Stallions	18	2	0	16	19	52	−33	6

==== South Atlantic Division ====
Pos	Team	Pld	W	SW	L	GF	GA	GD	Pts
1	Carolina Dynamo	18	14	1	3	37	15	+22	43
2	South Carolina Shamrocks	18	11	1	6	42	31	+11	34
3	Hampton Roads Mariners	18	9	4	5	32	15	+17	31
4	Tampa Bay Cyclones	18	9	1	8	40	32	+8	28
5	Raleigh Flyers	18	7	0	11	25	26	−1	21

=== Western Conference ===
==== Central Division ====
Pos	Team	Pld	W	SW	L	GF	GA	GD	Pts
1	Milwaukee Rampage	18	9	6	3	36	19	+17	33
2	Minnesota Thunder	18	10	0	8	31	16	+15	30
3	New Orleans Riverboat Gamblers	18	7	2	9	31	36	−5	23
4	Ohio Xoggz	18	5	1	12	26	34	−8	16
5	Chicago Stingers	18	4	1	13	29	41	−12	13

==== Pacific Division ====
Pos	Team	Pld	W	SW	L	GF	GA	GD	Pts
1	California Jaguars	18	11	1	6	30	21	+9	34
2	Sacramento Scorpions	18	9	2	7	23	22	+1	29
3	El Paso Patriots	18	9	1	8	30	23	+7	28
4	New Mexico Chiles	18	9	0	9	24	24	0	27
5	Reno Rattlers	18	1	5	12	13	33	−20	8

== Playoffs ==
=== First round ===
August 14, 1996
7:30 PM EST

Connecticut Wolves (CT)	2–3	Delaware Wizards (DE)
Ian Hennessy 60'; Mike Saunders 69' (pen.)	Report	41', 73' George Petou; 47' Andy Logar

New Britain Stadium, New Britain, Connecticut
Attendance: 1,206

August 14, 1996

South Carolina Shamrocks (SC)	2–2	Hampton Roads Mariners (VA)
Pearse Tormey 15' (pen.); David Minihan 89'		38' Paul Cann; 79' Dustin Swinehart
Penalties
Penalty missed	0–1	(penalty missed); (penalty scored) Nate Houser (penalty missed)

Eugene E. Stone III Stadium, Greenville, South Carolina
Attendance: 1,000

August 14, 1996

Minnesota Thunder (MN)	5–1	New Orleans Riverboat Gamblers (LA)
Todd Dusosky; Don Gramenz; Tim Foster; Gerard Lagos; Sergei Gotsmanov		89' Ezra Hendrickson

National Sports Center, Blaine, Minnesota
Attendance: 2,359

August 14, 1996
7:30 PM PST

Sacramento Scorpions (CA)	2–1 OT	El Paso Patriots (TX)
Tony Sutton; John Jones 100'		Dave Stewart

Woodcreek High School, Roseville, California
Attendance: 1,521

=== Second round ===
==== Minnesota Thunder vs Milwaukee Rampage ====
August 17, 1996

Minnesota Thunder (MN)	3–1	Milwaukee Rampage (WI)
Don Gramenz 71'; Todd Dusosky 83'; Gerard Lagos 87'		51' Mike Gentile

Macalester College, St. Paul, Minnesota
Attendance: 3,210

August 18, 1996

Milwaukee Rampage (WI)	2–0	Minnesota Thunder (MN)
Travis Roy 36'; Jason Willan 86'

Uihlein Soccer Park, Milwaukee, Wisconsin
Attendance: 3,659

August 18, 1996

Milwaukee Rampage (WI)	0–1	Minnesota Thunder (MN)
		20' Aaron Leventhal

Uihlein Soccer Park, Milwaukee, Wisconsin
Attendance: 3,659

==== Hampton Roads Mariners vs Carolina Dynamos ====
August 17, 1996

Carolina Dynamo (NC)	0–1 OT	Hampton Roads Mariners (VA)
David Moxon (red card) 35'; Yari Allnutt (red card) 65'	Report	93' Dustin Swinehart

Simeon Stadium, High Point, North Carolina
Attendance: 2,187 or 1,787

August 20, 1996

Hampton Roads Mariners (VA)	0–4	Carolina Dynamo (NC)
		34' Chugger Adair, Kevin Sloan; Alan Prampin

Old Dominion Soccer Complex, Norfolk, Virginia
Attendance: 2,409

August 20, 1996
10:00 PM EST

Hampton Roads Mariners (VA)	1–0	Carolina Dynamo (NC)
Nate Houser 25'

Old Dominion Soccer Complex, Norfolk, Virginia
Attendance: 2,409

==== California Jaguars vs Sacramento Scorpions ====
August 17, 1996
7:30 PM PST

Sacramento Scorpions (CA)	0–2	California Jaguars (CA)
		Ryshiem Henderson

Woodcreek High School, Roseville, California
Attendance: 2,229

August 18, 1996
4:00 PM PST

California Jaguars (CA)	2–1	Sacramento Scorpions (CA)
Luis Gomez; Chris Afarian		40' Brandon Cavitt; (red card) 47' Scott Hileman

Cabrillo College, Aptos, California
Attendance: 100

==== Long Island Rough Riders vs Delaware Wizards ====
August 23–24, 1996
7:30 PM EST

Long Island Rough Riders (NY)	2–0	Delaware Wizards (DE)
Jim Rooney 7'; Mike Masters 38'	Report

Mitchel Athletic Complex, Uniondale, New York
- The game was suspended in the 39th minute due to lightning. Play resumed on August 24, 1996, at 2:00 PM.

== Select Six Tournament ==
The Select Six Tournament consisted of six teams. The Richmond Kickers participated as hosts. The Charleston Battery entered as the champion of the 1996 USISL Professional League. The other four teams came from the winners of the second round playoff games.

=== Group A ===
Pos	Team	W	L	GF	GA	GD
1	California Jaguars	2	0	4	1	+3
2	Richmond Kickers	1	1	6	2	+4
3	Charleston Battery	0	2	2	9	−7

August 27, 1996
7:30 PM EST

Richmond Kickers (VA)	6–1	Charleston Battery (SC)
Robert Ukrop 52'; Stuart Fitzsimmons; Steve Kinsey; Ward		64' Patrick Olalere

City Stadium, Richmond, Virginia
August 28, 1996
7:30 PM EST

California Jaguars (CA)	3–1	Charleston Battery (SC)
Richie Louis 15'; Ralph Robertson 49'; Ryshiem Henderson 61'	Report	65' Patrick Olalere

City Stadium, Richmond, Virginia
Attendance: 150
August 29, 1996
7:30 PM EST

Richmond Kickers (VA)	0–1	California Jaguars (CA)
	Report	58' Ryshiem Henderson

City Stadium, Richmond, Virginia
Attendance: 800

=== Group B ===
Pos	Team	W	L	GF	GA	GD
1	Long Island Rough Riders	2	0	4	2	+2
2	Minnesota Thunder	1	1	3	3	0
3	Hampton Roads Mariners	0	2	4	6	−2

August 27, 1996
7:30 PM EST

Hampton Roads Mariners (VA)	2–3	Minnesota Thunder (MN)
Sterling Wescott 74:04'; Stilian Stishkov 76:50'	Report 1 Report 2	Don Gramenz 23:22' (pen.); Gerard Lagos 60:04', 67:55'

Old Dominion University, Norfolk, Virginia
Attendance: 1,287
August 28, 1996
7:30 PM EST

Long Island Rough Riders (NY)	1–0	Minnesota Thunder (MN)
Travis Rinker 66:23'

Old Dominion University, Norfolk, Virginia
August 29, 1996
7:30 PM EST

Hampton Roads Mariners (VA)	2–3	Long Island Rough Riders (NY)
87'	Report	Jim Rooney 15', 84'; 89:53' Flávio Ferri

Old Dominion University, Norfolk, Virginia
Attendance: 2,672

=== Semifinals ===
==== California Jaguars vs Minnesota Thunder ====
August 31, 1996

California Jaguars (CA)	4–2	Minnesota Thunder (MN)
Ralph Robertson 47', 77'; Adrian Gonzalez 52'; Luis Gomez 83'	Report	5' Amos Magee; (yellow card) 73' Mark Abboud; 78' Todd Dusosky; (yellow card) 90+3' William Alvarado

City Stadium, Richmond, Virginia

==== Richmond Kickers vs Long Island Rough Riders ====
August 31, 1996

Richmond Kickers (VA)	1–0	Long Island Rough Riders (NY)
Ruben Espinoza (yellow card) 45'; Robert Ukrop 82'	Report	(yellow card) 41' Jim Rooney; (yellow card) 72' Daniel Leon; (yellow card) 85' Paul Riley; (yellow card) 87' Travis Rinker

City Stadium, Richmond, Virginia
Attendance: 1,100

== Final ==
September 1, 1996
8:00 PM EST

Richmond Kickers (VA)	1–1	California Jaguars (CA)
Robert Ukrop 11' (yellow card) 22'	Report	(yellow card) 20' Ryshiem Henderson; (yellow card) 48' Niels Bruckner; 54' Adrian Gonzalez
Penalties
Ben Crawley (penalty missed); Leigh Cowlishaw (penalty scored); Brandon Ward (penalty missed); Neil Ryan (penalty missed); Robert Ukrop (penalty missed)	1–2	(penalty scored) Randy Mann; (penalty scored) Ryan Collins; (penalty missed) Derick Brownell; (penalty missed) Richie Louis; (penalty missed) Nathan King

City Stadium, Richmond, Virginia
Attendance: 2,500

== Points leaders ==
Rank	Scorer	Club	Goals	Assists	Points
1	(United States) Dan Stebbins	Milwaukee Rampage	21	8	50
2	(United States) Jamie Wellington	New Orleans Riverboat Gamblers	18	6	42
3	(Colombia) Luis Murillo	Tampa Bay Cyclones	16	5	37
4	(United States) Mike Gailey	Carolina Dynamo	14	8	36
5	(England) Ron Murphy	Cape Cod Crusaders	13	6	32
6	(United States) Yari Allnut	Carolina Dynamo	14	3	31
6	(Jamaica) Mike Saunders	Connecticut Wolves	15	1	31
8	(United States) Chugger Adair	Carolina Dynamo	13	4	30
9	(United States) Chad Carrithers	Sacramento Scorpions	13	3	29

== Honors ==
- MVP: (United States) Dan Stebbins (Milwaukee Rampage)
- Points leader: (United States) Dan Stebbins (Milwaukee Rampage)
- Defender of the Year: (Saint Vincent and the Grenadines) Ezra Hendrickson
- Goalkeeper of the Year: (United States) Scott Garlick (Greensboro Dynamo)
- Rookie of the Year: (Colombia) Luis Marillo
- Coach of the Year: (England) Alan Dicks
- Organization of the Year: Minnesota Thunder
- All-League
  - Goalkeeper: (Canada) Carmine Isacco
  - Defenders: (Saint Vincent and the Grenadines) Ezra Hendrickson, (United States) Derick Brownell, (United States) Stuart Fitzsimmons
  - Midfielders: (United States) Amos Magee, (United States) Travis Rinker, (Colombia) Oswaldo Ortiz, (United States) Yari Allnutt
  - Forwards: (United States) Dan Stebbins, (United States) John Jones, (Jamaica) Paul Young
