= Ralph Robertson (soccer) =

American soccer player

Personal information
- Position: Midfielder

Youth career
- Monta Vista High School

College career
Years	Team	Apps	(Gls)
1992	De Anza College		
1993–1995	UC Santa Barbara Gauchos		

Senior career*
Years	Team	Apps	(Gls)
1996–1998	California Jaguars	62	(16)
1998	Silicon Valley Ambassadors		(6)
1999	Sacramento Geckos	3	(0)
1999	Seattle Sounders	15	(1)
- * Club domestic league appearances and goals

Ralph Robertson is an American former professional soccer midfielder. He last played for Seattle Sounders of the USL A-League.

== Early life and education ==
Robertson was raised in Cupertino, California and attended Monta Vista High School. At Monta Vista, he played as a midfielder on the boys soccer team and was named All-County and All-Peninsula in 1991 and 1992. He then attended De Anza College where he played for their men's soccer program.

In 1993, Robertson transferred to the University of California, Santa Barbara and played for the UC Santa Barbara Gauchos men's soccer team. He played for the Gauchos from 1993 to 1995 and was named to the All-Far West Region and All-Mountain Pacific Sports Federation teams in 1994 and 1995.

== Playing career ==
Following his time at UCSB, Robertson joined California Jaguars for the 1996 USISL Select League season. He stayed with the team as they moved to the A-League and ultimately left following the 1998 season after appearing in 62 games, scoring 16 goals, for the club. He signed with Silicon Valley Ambassadors in May for the 1998 PDSL season.

He joined the Sacramento Geckos for the 1999 USL A-League and appeared three times before joining Seattle Sounders.
