= Brad Agoos =

American soccer player

Personal information
- Date of birth: 1970 or 1971 (age 55–56)
- Place of birth: Dallas, Texas, United States
- Positions: Defender; midfielder

College career
Years	Team	Apps	(Gls)
1989–1992	Virginia Cavaliers	88	

Senior career*
Years	Team	Apps	(Gls)
1993	FC Homburg		
- D.C. United
1994	Carolina Vipers (indoor)	26	(19)
1995	Charlotte Eagles		
1996	Charleston Battery		
1997	Worcester Wildfire	23	(0)
1997	Puntarenas		
1997–1998	Santa Bárbara		
1999	Vermont Voltage		
1999	Quick Den Haag		

Managerial career
- 1994–1995: Park Sharon SC
- 1999: Vermont Voltage (player-coach)
- 2000–2006: California Golden Bears (assistant)
- 2006–2011: Seattle Redhawks
- 2013–2015: Portland Timbers U18
- Crossfire Premier SC
- Norwich University (assistant)
- 2021–: Black Rock
- * Club domestic league appearances and goals

Brad Agoos is an American former soccer player and the current head coach of USL League Two side Black Rock.

== Playing career ==
After leaving the University of Virginia, where he had been named ACC Men's Soccer Tournament MVP in 1992, Agoos would embark on a journeyman career which took him to Germany, Costa Rica and the Netherlands.

He joined FC 08 Homburg in 1993, before returning to the United States with Major League Soccer side D.C. United. After playing one season in the Continental Indoor Soccer League with Carolina Vipers in 1994, Agoos played three consecutive seasons in the A-League with Charlotte Eagles, Charleston Battery and Worcester Wildfire.

In 1997, Agoos moved to Costa Rica to join Puntarenas. He also played for Santa Bárbara from 1997 to 1998.

He played for Vermont Voltage in 1999, while also serving as a coach, before moving to the Netherlands to sign with third-division side Quick Den Haag.

== Coaching career ==
Agoos started his coaching career at youth club Park Sharon SC in the 1994–95 season. After this, he volunteered at the Charlotte 49ers in 1996, and the San Francisco Dons in 1998.

He took up his first full-time role in 2000, when he became assistant coach of the California Golden Bears at the University of California, Berkeley. In 2006, he was appointed head coach at the Seattle Redhawks, where he stayed for six seasons before moving on in 2011, following a very tough schedule and run of bad results as the team was transitioning from D2 to D1.

Between 2013 and 2015, he was a youth academy coach at the Portland Timbers where he led the team to an excellent record. He then coached Crossfire Premier SC before taking up a position as assistant manager of the Norwich University men's soccer team in Vermont as well as the Vermont Green FC, where he was assistant coach for the men's side and co-led the inaugural VT Green women's team with former USWNT player and world cup winner Sam Mewis. Agoos has been a Coaching Director with Burlington Football Club and club coach with Nordic Soccer Club in Vermont, on both the boys and girls sides.

== Personal life ==
Agoos is Jewish. He is the brother of former soccer player Jeff Agoos.

== Career statistics ==
=== Club ===
Club	Season	League			Cup		Continental		Other		Total	
Club	Season	Division	Apps	Goals	Apps	Goals	Apps	Goals	Apps	Goals	Apps	Goals
Carolina Vipers	1994	CISL	26	19	0	0	–		0	0	26	19
Worcester Wildfire	1997	A-League	23	0	0	0	–		0	0	23	0
Career total			49	19	0	0	0	0	0	0	49	19
