= Kevin Rueda =

American soccer player

Personal information
- Date of birth: March 16, 1969 (age 57)
- Place of birth: United States]
- Height: 6 ft 4 in (1.93 m)
- Position: Goalkeeper

College career
Years	Team	Apps	(Gls)
1987–1991	Santa Clara Broncos		

Senior career*
Years	Team	Apps	(Gls)
1992–1993	Carcassonne		
1996–1998	California Jaguars		
1997	→ New England Revolution (loan)	0	(0)
1998	San Francisco Bay Seals	7	(0)
1998	→ Los Angeles Galaxy (loan)	0	(0)
1998	→ Chicago Fire (loan)	0	(0)
1998	→ Tampa Bay Mutiny (loan)	0	(0)
1999–2000	San Diego Flash	20	(0)
2000	Rochester Rhinos	1	(0)
2001	Atlanta Silverbacks	5	(0)
- * Club domestic league appearances and goals

Kevin Rueda (born March 16, 1969) is an American retired soccer goalkeeper who played professionally in the USISL and USL A-League.

== Youth ==
Rueda attended the Santa Clara University, playing on the men's soccer team from 1987 to 1991. In 1991, the Broncos fell to the Virginia Cavaliers in the NCAA Men's Division I Soccer Championship.

== Professional ==
During 1992–1993, Rueda played for Carcassonne in the Championnat de France amateur 2. In 1996, he signed with the California Jaguars of the USISL. That season, Rueda and his teammates won the championship. In July 1997, the New England Revolution called up Rueda as a standby goalkeeper. That year, Rueda was the USISL Western Conference All Star goalkeeper. On February 1, 1998, the San Jose Clash selected Rueda in the second round (fifteenth overall) of the 1998 MLS Supplemental Draft. On April 2, 1998, the Clash waived him during the pre-season. Rueda returned to the Jaguars but moved to the San Francisco Bay Seals in June. In July 1998, the Seals loaned Rueda to the Los Angeles Galaxy. In February 1999, the Seals traded Rueda to the San Diego Flash for the Flash's second round draft pick. He played seventeen games in 1999, but was relegated to backup in 2000. In June 2000, the Flash traded Rueda to the Rochester Rhinos in exchange for the Rhinos’ 2001 draft picks. Rueda played one game. In 2001, he played for the Atlanta Silverbacks.
