= Far End of the Sea =

Nauruan feature film

External videos
- Far End of the Sea — Upload by Pleasant Island Productions onto YouTube

Far End of the Sea
- Directed by: Matthew Holmes
- Written by: Jamie Coffa
- Produced by: Yannick Detsiogo
- Starring: Jamie Coffa, Cramer Cain
- Production company: Pleasant Island Productions
- Release date: 15 May 2026
- Running time: 53 minutes
- Country: Naoero

Far End of the Sea is the first feature film from Nauru (now named Naoero), released in 2026. The film is a historical drama set in 1842, focusing on a Nauruan warrior who comes upon a shipwrecked Scottish sailor, and the unlikely friendship that grows between them.

== Plot synopsis ==
The film follows Scottish sailor Hamish McKay, who becomes shipwrecked on the island of Naoero in 1842, and is held captive by Adiben, a local warrior who has been banished from his village following the loss of his wife. The pair go on a journey towards Adiben's village, encountering challenges along the way, and begin to form a bond. The plot and characters are fictional, but based on Nauruan history.

== Cast ==
There are 5 characters in the film, although Coffa has argued that Naoero itself is the "sixth character":

- Jamie Coffa as Hamish McKay
- Cramer Cain as Adiben
- Sophie McAsey
- Redrose Tamakin
- Brav Dowabobo

== Themes ==
The film focuses on themes of brotherhood, compassion and national pride.

== Production ==
=== Development ===
Coffa wrote the script in 2018 before revisiting the project in 2025. Far End of the Sea was originally conceived as a short film that would be shot in Cairns, Queensland, recreating a Naoero beach landscape to decrease expenses. However, Cain insisted the film should be shot in Naoero itself. It was initially difficult to find funding. However, later the Naoero government helped fund the film and gave permission for it to be filmed on the island.

=== Pre-production ===
Coffa's family had moved to the island in his early childhood, and although they'd moved away again later, he became interested in making a film related to Naoero. Cain had acted in Australian media such as Home and Away for around 34 years, but this film was his first project based in his home country. Coffa had known Cain during his childhood, when Cain had been a news reporter, and had watched his performance in the film Sanctum. He wrote the part of Adiben specifically for Cain.

=== Production ===
The film was shot entirely in Naoero across seven different locations within the country. The cast and crew was made up of both people from Naoero and Australia, including 58 Nauruan cast and crew members.

As the film is relatively short for a feature film, at 53 minutes long, it was difficult to complete a story arc within the time frame. They instead focused on using contemporary cinematic approaches, such as taking the audience on a journey with the characters. For example, steady cam rigs were used to give the illusion that the audience was running through the bush alongside the characters.

The soundtrack was written and sung by local Nauruans.

== Release ==
The film was released on May 15, 2026. It was also released onto YouTube for free, on May 21 of the same year. As of September 2026, the film has over 820,000 views on YouTube.

== Response ==
The President of Naoero, David Adeang, said that he hoped the film could encourage other small nations, commenting "few would expect a film of this quality and depth to be made here." Detsiogo said that the most common response he received from audience members after the premiere was that "the film really made [them] emotional".

One review by the Australian Broadcasting Corporation rated the film 10 out of 10.
