= Ralph Robertson =

Ralph Robertson may refer to:

- R. E. Robertson (1885–1961), American politician
- Ralph Robertson (Australian footballer) (1881–1917), Australian rules footballer
- Ralph Robertson (soccer), American soccer player
