= Illarionov =

Illarionov, Ilarionov (Russian: Илларионов, Иларионов; masculine) or Illarionova, Ilarionova (Илларионова, Иларионова; feminine) is a common Russian surname originating from the masculine given name Hilarion. The surname is shared by the following people:

- Anastasiia Illarionova (born 1999), Russian handball player
- Andrey Illarionov (born 1961), Russian economist
- Dimitri Illarionov (born 1979), Russian classical guitarist
- Ivaylo Ilarionov (Bulgarian Cyrillic: Ивайло Иларионов; born 6 January 1973) is a retired Bulgarian association football
