= Chris Afarian =

American soccer player (born 1972)

Personal information
- Date of birth: June 5, 1972 (age 54)
- Height: 5 ft 8 in (1.73 m)
- Position: Midfielder

College career
Years	Team	Apps	(Gls)
1990–1994	Santa Clara		

Senior career*
Years	Team	Apps	(Gls)
1995	San Jose Grizzlies (indoor)	12	(2)
1996–1997	California Jaguars		
Total		18+	(4+)
- * Club domestic league appearances and goals

Chris Afarian (born June 5, 1972) is an American former soccer player who played for the San Jose Grizzlies in the Continental Indoor Soccer League and the California Jaguars in the A-League.

== University ==
Afarian studied at the Santa Clara University, where he played both American football and soccer. He was named to the all-conference team in 1994.

== Career statistics ==
=== Club ===
Club	Season	League			Cup		Continental		Other		Total	
Club	Season	Division	Apps	Goals	Apps	Goals	Apps	Goals	Apps	Goals	Apps	Goals
San Jose Grizzlies	1995	Continental Indoor Soccer League	12	2	0	0	–		0	0	12	2
Career total			12	2	0	0	0	0	0	0	12	2
