= Scott Hileman =

American soccer player

Personal information
- Date of birth: November 5, 1972 (age 53)
- Place of birth: Phoenix, Arizona, U.S.
- Height: 6 ft 1 in (1.85 m)
- Position: Goalkeeper

Youth career
- 1992–1994: Portland Pilots

Senior career*
Years	Team	Apps	(Gls)
1995	Arizona Sandsharks (indoor)	20	(0)
1996	Sacramento Scorpions	19	(0)
1997	Arizona Sandsharks (indoor)		
1996–1998	Edmonton Driller (indoor)	78	(0)
1998–1999	Florida ThunderCats (indoor)	25	(0)
1999–2004	Baltimore Blast (indoor)	183	(3)

International career
2004	US Futsal	7	(0)
- * Club domestic league appearances and goals

Scott Hileman is an American retired soccer goalkeeper who played professionally in the Continental Indoor Soccer League and the National Professional Soccer League. He played two games for the United States national futsal team at the 2004 FIFA Futsal World Championship.

== Youth ==
Hileman graduated from Marcos De Niza High School. In 1990, he was goalkeeper for Marcos when it tied Brophy Prep in the Arizona Class 5-A state championship. The game is considered one of the greatest in Arizona secondary history, featuring six future professionals and one future national team member. Hileman attended the University of Portland, where he ranks second behind Kasey Keller in the school's goalkeeper records. He graduated with a bachelor's degree in biology.

== Professional ==
In 1995, Hileman turned professional with the Arizona Sandsharks in the Continental Indoor Soccer League. In 1996, he moved outdoors with the Sacramento Scorpions of the 1996 USISL Select League. In the fall of 1996, Hileman signed with the Edmonton Drillers of the National Professional Soccer League. In June 1997, he returned to the Sandsharks for the summer. In September 1998, the Drillers sent him to the expansion Florida ThunderCats in exchange for cash. On March 4, 1999, the Thundercats sold Hileman's contract to the Baltimore Blast. Hileman played for the Blast until 2004. In 2000, he was named to the Second Team All-League. In 2003 and 2004, he won the Major Indoor Soccer League championship with the Blast. From 2007 to 2008, he played for Kickers Scotland Yard in the Suncoast Soccer League.

== Futsal ==
Hileman played for the United States national futsal team. He played two games for the team at the 2004 FIFA Futsal World Championship.
