= Myrtle Beach Boyz =

American soccer team

The Myrtle Beach Boyz were an American soccer team that played in Myrtle Beach, South Carolina. They were part of the USISL professional soccer league that was the eventually the foundation for Major League Soccer we see today. In addition The A league and other professional soccer leagues help contribute to Major League Soccer with many players from both USISL and A League going on to play in the MLS

The roster included:

- Jimmy McGeough (SUNY Farmingdale)
- Troy "Chopper" Edwards (Florida International University) *USISL Defender of the Year
- Willie Files (Belmont Abbey)
- John Garvey (University of Maryland)
- Shawn Dees (UNC Pembroke)
- Marlow Campbell (NC State)
- David Mallick (UNC Pembroke)
- Carlos Garcia (UNC Charlotte)
- Gabe Garcia (UNC Charlotte)
- Henry Gutierrez (NC State)
- Kevin Scott (NC State)
- Chris Diaz (Jamaica)
- among others....

The head coach was David Irving, who currently coaches for the Tulsa Roughnecks in the USL PRO league, as of 2014.

The team played their homes games at Doug Shaw Memorial Stadium in Myrtle Beach.

The Boyz advanced to the national playoffs in their first season, advancing to the semi-finals.

1995 USISL Atlantic Division[edit]

- Regulation win = 6 points
- Shootout win (SW) = 4 points
- Shootout loss (SL) = 2 points
- Regulation loss = 0 points
- Bonus points (BP): An additional one-point per goal up to a maximum of three points per game.

Place	Team	GP	W	L	SW	SL	GF	GA	GD	BP	Points
1	Charleston Battery	20	16	2	1	1	58	16	+42	44	146
2	Charlotte Eagles	20	13	6	1	0	59	35	+24	45	129
3	Raleigh Flyers	20	13	5	1	1	49	32	+17	42	126
4	Myrtle Beach Boyz	20	13	6	0	1	51	36	+15	39	119
5	Hampton Roads Mariners	20	12	6	1	1	51	31	+20	41	119
6	Greensboro Dynamo	20	11	9	0	0	55	33	+22	43	111

ATLANTIC DIVISION PLAYOFFS

First Round

8/12/95 Charleston Battery 0-3 Myrtle Beach Boyz

8/12/95 Charlotte Eagles 0-2 Raleigh Flyers

Finals (Best of Three)

8/17/95 Myrtle Beach Boyz 1-6 Raleigh Flyers

8/19/95 Raleigh Flyers 1-3 Myrtle Beach Boyz

- The teams played a mini-game immediately after to decide who advanced after finishing the series tied at one game apiece.

8/19/95 Raleigh Flyers 0-2 Myrtle Beach Boyz (Myrtle Beach advances)

SIZZLIN' NINE CHAMPIONSHIP

8/28/95 Myrtle Beach Boyz 3-5 Tampa Bay Cyclones

8/29/95 Milwaukee Rampage 3-2 Tampa Bay Cyclones

8/30/95 Myrtle Beach Boyz 4-2 Milwaukee Rampage (Myrtle Beach advanced to Semi-Finals on goal differential)

SEMI-FINALS

9/2/95 Minnesota Thunder 3-2(ot) Myrtle Beach Boyz

== Year-by-year ==
Year	Division	League	Reg. season	Playoffs	Open Cup
1995	3	USISL Pro League	4th, Atlantic	Semifinals	Did not qualify
