= Brandon Cavitt =

American soccer player (born 1973)

Personal information
- Date of birth: March 28, 1973 (age 53)
- Place of birth: Stockton, California, United States
- Height: 5 ft 8 in (1.73 m)
- Position: Midfielder

Youth career
- 1992: Sonoma State University
- 1993–1995: Sacramento State University

Senior career*
Years	Team	Apps	(Gls)
1992–1995	San Francisco All Blacks		
1996	Sacramento Scorpions		
1997	Sacramento Knights (indoor)		
1998	New Orleans Storm	22	(0)
1999–2001	Sacramento Knights (indoor)		
2002–2003	Dallas Sidekicks (indoor)	7	(2)
- * Club domestic league appearances and goals

Brandon Cavitt (born March 28, 1973, in Stockton, California) is a retired U.S. soccer midfielder who spent five seasons in the USISL, one in the Continental Indoor Soccer League, one in the World Indoor Soccer League and one in the Major Indoor Soccer League.

== Youth ==
In 1992, Cavitt began his collegiate career at Sonoma State University. In the summer of 1993, he transferred to Sacramento State University where he played from 1993 to 1995. His seventeen career assists puts him tied for the school record. He was inducted into the school's Athletic Honor Roll in 2005. He graduated in 2003 with a bachelor's degree in English.

== Professional ==
In 1992, Cavitt joined with the expansion San Francisco All Blacks of the USISL as an amateur player. He spent each collegiate off seasons with San Francisco through the 1995 season. In February 1996, the Dallas Burn selected Cavitt in the third round (twenty-eighth overall) of the 1996 MLS College Draft. The Burn waived him on March 26, 1996, during a pre-season roster reduction. He then returned to Northern California where he played for the Sacramento Scorpions of the USISL. He moved to the Sacramento Knights of the Continental Indoor Soccer League for the 1997 summer indoor season. In 1998, he played for the St. Louis Storm in the USISL A-League but returned to the Knights in 1999, playing for them through the 2001 season. In 1999, the Knights played in the World Indoor Soccer League, winning the league title. The Dallas Sidekicks selected Cavitt with the 15th pick of the 2002 MISL Dispersal Draft. He signed with Dallas on February 6, 2003, and played seven games with them during the 2003–2004 season.
