= 1995 Fort Lauderdale Strikers season =

Fort Lauderdale Strikers
1995 season
- USISL Professional League: South East Division: Fourth place
- USISL playoffs: Divisional semifinalist
Home colors	Away colors

The 1995 Fort Lauderdale Strikers season was the first season of the new team in the United States Interregional Soccer League, playing in the USISL Professional League. It was also the twenty-ninth season of the club in professional soccer. Previously the club had fielded a team in the American Soccer League. After they folded that team, the club joined with the Fort Lauderdale Kicks in 1994 and created this team for the 1995 season. This year, the team finished in fourth place in the Southeast Division and did not make the playoffs. This would be the last incarnation of the Fort Lauderdale Strikers name until the 2011 team, as the club folded this team in the same year. The club fielded a new team known as the Florida Strikers in the 1996 season, playing in the USISL Premier League.

== Competitions ==
=== USISL Professional League regular season ===
- Regulation win = 6 points
- Shootout win (SW) = 4 points
- Shootout loss (SL) = 2 points
- Regulation loss = 0 points
- Bonus points (BP): An additional one-point per goal up to a maximum of three points per game.
