= Henry Gutierrez =

American soccer player and coach

Personal information
- Full name: Hendrig Gutierrez
- Date of birth: August 28, 1968 (age 58)
- Place of birth: Hoboken, New Jersey, United States
- Height: 5 ft 8 in (1.73 m)
- Positions: Midfielder; forward

College career
Years	Team	Apps	(Gls)
1988–1991	NC State Wolfpack		

Senior career*
Years	Team	Apps	(Gls)
1991	Stade Rennais	0	(0)
1992	Stade Brest 29	7	(1)
1992–1993	Stade Saint-Brieuc		
1993–1994	Stade Brest 29		
1994–1997	Cleveland Crunch (indoor)	112	(118)
1995	Myrtle Beach Boyz		
1996	San Jose Clash	7	(1)
1996–1997	Rochester Raging Rhinos	30	(4)
1997	Seattle Sounders	4	(1)
1998–2000	Miami Fusion	87	(14)
2001–2002	Pittsburgh Riverhounds	47	(2)
2002	Baltimore Blast (indoor)	14	(4)
2008	Cary RailHawks U23s	1	(0)

International career
- U.S. U-17
- U.S. U-20
1999	United States	1	(0)

Managerial career
- Rochester Raging Rhinos youth
- Pittsburgh Riverhounds youth
- Fuquay-Varina Athletic Association
- 2008: Cary RailHawks U23's (assistant)
- * Club domestic league appearances and goals

Hendrig "Henry" Gutierrez (born August 28, 1968, in Hoboken, New Jersey and raised in Miami) is an American former soccer player who began his career in the lower French divisions before finishing it in the United States. He was a member of the U.S. teams at the 1985 FIFA U-16 World Championship and the 1987 FIFA World Youth Championship. He earned one cap with the United States men's national soccer team.

== Player ==
=== Youth ===
In 1987, Gutierrez graduated from Hialeah Miami Lakes High School. He was a 1986 Parade Magazine High School All American soccer player. Gutierrez attended North Carolina State University where he played as both a midfielder and forward on the men's soccer team from 1988 to 1991. He was named a first team All American as a midfielder in 1988, as a freshman, and as a forward in 1991, his senior year. He was also a one time second team All American and two time ACC Player of the Year. He was also selected as the 1991 ISAA Player of the Year.

=== Professional ===
In 1991, Gutierrez played for French Second Division club Stade Rennais and in 1992 with Stade Brestois 29. He then moved to Stade Saint-Brieuc for the 1992–1993 season, but was back with Brest for the 1993–1994 season. On October 21, 1994, Gutierrez signed a three-year contract with the Cleveland Crunch of the National Professional Soccer League (NPSL). The season was already in play and Gutierrez debuted the next day, scoring two goals. That season, he won NPSL Rookie of the Year. During the 1995–1996 preseason, he broke his foot during a game with the Milwaukee Wave. He missed the first eight games of the season, but came back strong, finishing fourth on the team in scoring. He was a key part of the Crunch's march to the 1995–1996 NPSL championship title. Gutierrez remained with the Crunch through the end of the 1996–1997 season playing indoor soccer with them and outdoor soccer with various teams. He also played fourteen games for the Baltimore Blast in the 2001–2002 season. In 1995, Gutierrez was with the Myrtle Beach Boyz of USISL. The Boyz folded at the end of the season. In 1996, the San Jose Clash of Major League Soccer (MLS) selected Gutierrez in the tenth round (98th overall) of the first MLS draft. He played in only seven games during the 1996 season, scoring one goal before the Clash released him. He spent the rest of the 1996 outdoor seasons with the Rochester Raging Rhinos of the A-League. In 1997, he began the season with the Rhinos. In August, the Rhinos traded Gutierrez to the Seattle Sounders in exchange for Nate Daligcon and Justin Stoddard. Gutierrez rejoined MLS with the Miami Fusion in 1998. He spent three seasons in Miami, appearing in 87 regular season and playoff games, scoring 14 goals and assisting on 25 others. In 2001 Gutierrez moved to the Pittsburgh Riverhounds of the USL Second Division. He spent two season with Pittsburgh. In January 2002, he signed with the Baltimore Blast on loan from the Riverhounds for the remainder of the Major Indoor Soccer League season.

=== National team ===
Gutierrez was a star youth player and was selected for the U.S. team which went 1–2 at the 1985 U-16 World Cup. In 1987, he was a member of the U.S. team at the U-20 World Cup. The U.S. again ran to a 1–2 record and failed to make the second round. Gutierrez earned his only cap with the U.S. senior team in a September 8, 1999 tie with Jamaica. He started the game, but came off for Chris Albright.

== Coach ==
Gutierrez coaches youth soccer with Fuquay-Varina Athletic Association of North Carolina. In January 2008, he was hired as the assistant coach with the Cary RailHawks U23's of the fourth division Premier Development League. In 2013, he became a coach for the TFCA Academy. They finished with a poor record in the 2013–14 season. In the 2014–15 season however, the team is 5-5-0 in league play. When asking one of his players, Patrick O'Neill, how they were playing, he said it was "fun". He is also one of the head directors at Triangle futbol club alliance(TFCA). He now coaches at NCFC.
