= John Jones (soccer) =

American soccer player (born 1973)

Personal information
- Full name: John Jones II
- Date of birth: November 23, 1973 (age 52)
- Place of birth: Folsom, California, U.S.
- Height: 5 ft 11 in (1.80 m)
- Position: Midfielder

Youth career
- American River College
- Sacramento State
- Tahuichi Academy

Senior career*
Years	Team	Apps	(Gls)
1995	PC Aquias		
1996	Sacramento Scorpions	?	(10)
1997	Los Angeles Galaxy	5	(0)
1997	→ Orange County Zodiac (loan)	3	(0)
1997	Orange County Zodiac	12	(2)
1998	Tampa Bay Mutiny	0	(0)
1998	Charleston Battery	4	(1)
1998	Nashville Metros	19	(2)
1999	Los Angeles Galaxy	0	(0)
2000–2001	Pittsburgh Riverhounds	44	(3)
2002	Charleston Battery	21	(5)
2003	Des Moines Menace	10	(6)
2006	Vancouver Whitecaps	0	(0)
- * Club domestic league appearances and goals

John Jones is an American retired soccer midfielder who played professionally in the USISL and Major League Soccer.

== Youth ==
Jones graduated from Folsom High School where he scored 37 goals his senior season. Jones began his collegiate career with American River College in Sacramento, California. He broke his arm midway through his sophomore season which forced him to sit out the remaining games. He then transferred to Sacramento State. He later spent six months with Tahuichi Academy. Jones also played for PSC Aguias of the Central California Soccer League (CCSL).

== Professional ==
In 1996, Jones turned professional with the expansion Sacramento Scorpions of the USISL. He was selected as First Team All-USISL. On February 2, 1997, the Los Angeles Galaxy selected Jones in the second round (nineteenth overall) of the 1997 MLS Supplemental Draft. He played five games with the Galaxy and another three on loan to the Orange County Zodiac of the USISL A-League. On July 1, 1997, the Galaxy waived Jones and he signed with the Zodiac on July 17. In February 1998, the Tampa Bay Mutiny selected Jones in the second round (twenty-fourth overall) of the 1998 MLS Supplemental Draft. Jones did not enter a first team game before being waived early in the season. On April 14, 1998, Jones signed with the Charleston Battery. On May 28, 1998, the Battery traded Jones to the Nashville Metros in exchange for Jeremy Gunn. He played seventeen games, scoring two goals for the Metros. On February 7, 1999, the Los Angeles Galaxy again selected Jones, this time in the second round (twenty-second overall) of the 1999 MLS Supplemental Draft. He played most of the season out on loan, then broke his leg in August. In 2000 and 2001, he played for the Pittsburgh Riverhounds. In 2002, he played for the Charleston Battery. In 2003, he played for the Des Moines Menace of the Premier Development League. In 2005, he played one game with the Los Angeles Galaxy reserve team. In 2006, he joined the Vancouver Whitecaps of the USL First Division.
