= Randy Mann =

American soccer player

Personal information
- Place of birth: United States
- Height: 6 ft 1 in (1.85 m)
- Positions: Defender; midfielder

Youth career
- 1989–1992: Stanford Cardinal

Senior career*
Years	Team	Apps	(Gls)
1995–1998	California Jaguars		
1998–1999	Seattle Sounders	37	(0)
- * Club domestic league appearances and goals

Randy Mann is an American retired soccer player who played professionally in the USISL A-League.

Mann graduated from Riverside Polytechnic High School. He attended Stanford University, playing on the men's soccer team from 1989 to 1992. He graduated with a bachelor's degree in international relations. In 1995, he signed with the Monterey Bay Jaguars in the USISL Pro League. The next season, the team became the California Jaguars and competed in the 1996 USISL Select League. That season, Mann was one of two Jaguars players to make their penalty kicks as California defeated the Richmond Kickers in the final of the league championship. In 1997, the Jaguars joined the USISL A-League which was formed by the merger of the A-League and Select League. In 1998, Mann began the season with the Jaguars, but in May the team began to release its highest paid players. When the Seattle Sounders heard of this, head coach Neil Megson offered Mann a contract. Mann joined the Sounders on June 5, 1998. He retired at the end of the 1999 season. After his retirement, Mann worked at the Lucile Packard Foundation for Children's Health. In December 2004, the Swedish Medical Center hired Mann.
