= Mike Britton =

American soccer player and coach

Personal information
- Full name: Michael Britton
- Date of birth: August 4, 1970 (age 56)
- Place of birth: Rochester, New York, U.S.
- Height: 5 ft 10 in (1.78 m)
- Positions: Defender; midfielder

Youth career
- 1988–1991: Syracuse Orange

Senior career*
Years	Team	Apps	(Gls)
1992–1995	Buffalo Blizzard (indoor)	102	(26)
1996	Buffalo Blizzard (indoor)	10	(0)
1996–1997	Houston Hotshots (indoor)		
1998	Rochester Rhinos	10	(2)
1999	Houston Hotshots (indoor)	21	(?)
1999–2000	Buffalo Blizzard (indoor)	31	(5)

Managerial career
- Monroe Community College (assistant)
- * Club domestic league appearances and goals

Mike Britton is an American retired soccer player who spent most of his career in indoor leagues. He is an assistant to his wife Tracey Britton who coaches the Monroe Community College women's soccer team.

In 1993, Britton graduated from East High School in Rochester, New York. He attended the Syracuse University where he played on the men's soccer team from 1988 to 1991.

On September 14, 1992, the expansion Buffalo Blizzard chose Britton in the third round of the National Professional Soccer League Draft. He played three seasons with the Blizzard, becoming a regular on the back line. In June 1995, the Tampa Bay Terror selected Britton in the NPSL Expansion Draft, then traded him to the Wichita Wings in exchange for John Garvey. Britton refused to sign with the Wings who then sent his rights back to the Blizzard in September 1995 in exchange for cash. Britton sat out most of the season, signing with the Blizzard in January 1996 and playing ten games. In June 1996, Britton joined the Houston Hotshots of the Continental Indoor Soccer League which went to the league final before falling to the Monterrey La Raza. On February 2, 1997, the Colorado Rapids selected Britton in the third round (twenty-third overall) of the 1997 MLS Supplemental Draft. When the Rapids released him, he rejoined the Hotshots for the 1997 season. In 1998, he played for the Rochester Rhinos of the USISL. In 1999, he returned to the Hotshots, now playing in the World Indoor Soccer League. When the WISL season ended, Britton rejoined the Blizzard in December 1999. He retired from playing professionally at the end of the season.

Britton is now a teacher at Monroe Community College where he assists his wife Tracey Britton who is the head coach of the women's soccer team.
