= Ivaylo Ilarionov =

Bulgarian footballer

Personal information
- Date of birth: January 6, 1973 (age 53)
- Place of birth: Sofia, Bulgaria
- Height: 1.78 m (5 ft 10 in)
- Positions: Forward; midfielder

Senior career*
Years	Team	Apps	(Gls)
1993–1995	CSKA Sofia	22	(0)
1994	→ Spartak Pleven (loan)	?	(?)
1995	→ Chattanooga (loan)	15	(18)
1995–1996	Levski Kyustendil	?	(?)
1996–1997	Admira Wacker	28	(0)
1997–1998	SV Gerasdorf	3	(1)
1998	Nashville Metros	17	(7)
1999–2000	Charleston Battery	44	(10)
2001	Atlanta Silverbacks	5	(0)
2004–2005	Atlanta Silverbacks	44	(2)
- * Club domestic league appearances and goals

Ivaylo Ilarionov (Bulgarian Cyrillic: Ивайло Иларионов; born 6 January 1973) is a retired Bulgarian association football forward and midfielder who played professionally in Bulgaria, Austria and the United States.

Ilarionov began his career with PFC CSKA Sofia in Bulgaria. In 1995, he came to the United States for the summer, playing for the Chattanooga Railroaders in the 1995 USISL Professional League. In 1996, Ilarionov was transferred to Admira Wacker Wien. During the 1997-1998, he is only shown as playing three games for SV Gerasdorf. In 1998, Ilarionov moved permanently to the United States, signing with the Nashville Metros in the USISL A-League. In 1999, he moved to the Charleston Battery for two seasons. In 2001, he played five games for the Atlanta Silverbacks. He returned to the Silverbacks for the 2004 and 2005 seasons.
