= Mike Saunders (footballer) =

Jamaican footballer (born 1972)

Personal information
- Full name: Michael C. Saunders
- Date of birth: April 1, 1972 (age 54)
- Place of birth: Jamaica
- Height: 6 ft 3 in (1.91 m)
- Position: Forward

Youth career
- 1990–1992: Connecticut Huskies

Senior career*
Years	Team	Apps	(Gls)
1993–1994	Connecticut Wolves		
1995–1996	New York Fever		
1996	→ Connecticut Wolves (loan)	?	(15)
1996–1997	Wichita Wings (indoor)	11	(4)
1997	Connecticut Wolves	11	(5)
1997	→ Carolina Dynamo (loan)	3	(2)
1998–1999	Minnesota Thunder	26	(7)
2000	Connecticut Wolves	5	(0)

Managerial career
- 2010–: University of the District of Columbia (assistant)
- * Club domestic league appearances and goals

Mike Saunders is a retired Jamaican soccer player who played professionally in the USL A-League and National Professional Soccer League.

Saunders attended the University of Connecticut where he played on the Huskies soccer team from 1990 to 1992. In 1993, he left the team to sign with the Connecticut Wolves of the USISL. He played for the Wolves again in 1994. In 1995, Saunders joined the New York Fever. In 1996, the Fever moved up to the A-League, but they sent Saunders on lone to the Wolves of the 1996 USISL Select League for most of the season. Despite playing on loan, Saunders scored fifteen goals for Connecticut. That fall, Saunders moved indoors with the Wichita Wings of the National Professional Soccer League. He was back with the Connecticut Wolves in 1997 as it played in the 1997 USISL A-League. The Wolves sent Saunders on loan to the Carolina Dynamo for three games. On January 20, 1998, the Connecticut Wolves sold Saunders contract to the Minnesota Thunder. In 1999, Saunders and the Thunder won the USL A-League championship. On May 10, 2000, the Thunder released Saunders. Eight days later, the Connecticut Wolves signed him. He played five games that season, then retired.

In June 2010, Saunders became an assistant with the University of the District of Columbia men’s soccer team.
