= Matthew Holmes =

Matthew or Matt Holmes may refer to:

- Matthew Currie Holmes (born 1974), Canadian actor, producer, writer, and director
- Matthew Holmes (cyclist) (born 1993), British cyclist
- Matthew Holmes (engineer) (1844–1903), Chief Mechanical Engineer of the North British Railway (1882–1903)
- Matthew Holmes (politician) (1817–1901), member of the New Zealand Legislative Council
- Matthew Holmes (director), Australian film director, producer, writer and actor
- Matt Holmes (actor) (born 1976), Australian actor
- Matt Holmes (Royal Marines officer) (1967–2021), British general
- Matt Holmes (soccer), retired American soccer player
- Matty Holmes (born 1969), English footballer
