= Sacramento Geckos =

- Full name: Albuquerque Geckos; Sacramento Geckos; Team Sacramento
- Nickname: Geckos
- Founded: 1997 (as Albuquerque Geckos)
- Dissolved: 1999 (as Team Sacramento)
- Owner(s): (United States) Al Valentine; United Soccer Leagues
- League: USL D-3 Pro League (1997); USL A-League (1998-1999)

The Sacramento Geckos were an American soccer club that competed in the United Soccer Leagues from 1997 to 1999. The club was founded as the Albuquerque Geckos in Albuquerque, New Mexico, in 1997 before being sold and moved to Sacramento, California, for the 1999 season.

The Geckos had great success in their debut, winning the USL D-3 Pro League championship in 1997 before moving up to the Tier 2 A-League in 1998. The team suffered a miserable season where they won only five games. The move to California didn't produce success, as the Geckos failed to win a game or survive the season, with the USL stepping in to buy the team, renaming them Team Sacramento, before folding at the end of the 1999 campaign.

== History ==
The Geckos began as a franchise in New Mexico, following a decade of operating as a semi-professional/professional club soccer in Albuquerque from 1986-1996 with the Albuquerque Outlaws, Albuquerque Gunners, New Mexico Roadrunners, and New Mexico Chiles. In 1997, the City of Albuquerque and owner Al Valentine committed to pro soccer with the debut of the Geckos in the USL D-3 Pro League in 1997. The team had instant success with a 15-3 (W-L) record, winning the league championship in its first year.

Following this success, the team jumped up to tier 2 in the American soccer pyramid, joining the USL A-League in 1998. The club failed to produce similar results and, burdened with financial problems, was sold to a new ownership group in Sacramento, California. The Sacramento Geckos struggled with existing club debt and continued to produce poor results on the field, setting an all-time league record for losing all 28 games and being outscored 91-16 for the year, The Geckos only lasted another half a season before the United Soccer Leagues were forced to buy the team, renaming them Team Sacramento. The team folded following the 1999 season.

== Year-by-year ==
Year	Division	League	Reg. season	Playoffs	Open Cup
1997	3	USISL D-3 Pro League	1st, South Central	Champion	First Round
1998	2	USL A-League	7th, Central	Did not qualify	Did not qualify
1999	2	USL A-League	7th, Pacific	Did not qualify	Did not qualify

== See also ==
- Sacramento Scorpions
- Sacramento Gold
- New Mexico Chiles
