= Wilmington Hammerheads FC =

- Full name: Wilmington Hammerheads Football Club
- Nickname: Hammers
- Founded: 1996 (30 years ago)
- Dissolved: 2017 (9 years ago)
- Executive Director: Carson Porter
- League: Premier Development League
- Website: www.wilmingtonhammerheadsyouth.com
Home colors	Away colors

Wilmington Hammerheads FC was a semi-professional American soccer team based in Wilmington, North Carolina. Founded in 1996, the team last competed in the Premier Development League, the fourth tier of the American Soccer Pyramid in 2017.

== History ==
The Hammerheads had one championship in 2003, and were a finalist in 2002 and 2012, losing to the Long Island Rough Riders 2–1 in 2002 and losing 0–1 to the Charleston Battery in 2012. Wilmington found great success in the US Open Cup in their later years, regularly drawing MLS teams in the late rounds. Their most famous result occurred in 2003 when they drew the Dallas Burn, an MLS team, in the middle of a particularly bad year. They shocked the soccer world by defeating the Burn 4–1 at Legion Sports Complex before bowing out to D.C. United 1–0 in the quarterfinal round. The Hammerheads regularly drew well over 2,000 fans per game, and had drawn nearly 5,000 for playoff games. On June 30, 2009, the Hammerheads upset the Chicago Fire in the third round of the 2009 US Open Cup 1–0 at home.

The team went on hiatus in 2010 and returned for the 2011 USL PRO regular season, due to local businessman Bill Rudisill and a minority ownership group combining their efforts and financial support to the Port City. Following the 2011 USL PRO regular season, the Hammerheads competed in the division semifinals. In 2012, the Hammerheads finished their regular season with an overall record of 10–7–7 After qualifying for playoffs, they defeated both the Richmond Kickers and Orlando City Lions to obtain their spot in the finals versus the Charleston Battery whom took the 2012 USL PRO Championship title at Blackbaud Stadium after defeating the Hammerheads 1–0. The Hammerheads fell short of qualifying for a playoff position following their 2013 regular season.

In 2013, Daniel Steres led the team in goals with seven. He received the team's Most Valuable Player award, and was named to the 2013 USL PRO All-League Second Team.

In September 2013, the Wilmington Hammerheads announced that after three years of ownership, Bill Rudisill had sold a majority share to George Altirs, CEO of Capelli New York. Rudisill retained a minority share of the club.

In January 2014, the Wilmington Hammerheads entered a developmental partnership deal with Major League Soccer side Toronto FC that would see a minimum of four Toronto players come to Wilmington with the goal of gaining first team experience. In August 2014, the Hammerheads' longtime head coach, Englishman David Irving, stepped down from his position following fifteen seasons with the club.

New York City FC announced a one-year affiliation with the Hammerheads in January 2015, in which NYCFC would send players to train and play in Wilmington for further development. The clubs renewed their affiliation agreement for the 2016 season.

On August 1, 2016, it was reported that the Hammerheads were planning another hiatus from the USL, beginning with the 2017 season. This would allow the club to restructure "in order to keep pace with the growth in stature of the USL." Six weeks later, the Washington Post reported that the Hammerheads were a possible contender to move to Baltimore, Maryland for the 2018 season, noting that Wilmington is the smallest of the league's twenty-nine markets. The team self-relegated to the Premier Development League on September 29, 2016.

After the 2017 season, the PDL team was disbanded. The organization continues as a youth soccer academy under the name Wilmington Hammerheads Youth FC.

== Stadium ==
- Legion Stadium: Wilmington, North Carolina (2003–2009, 2011–2016)
- UNCW Soccer Stadium: Wilmington, North Carolina (2017)

=== Notable former players ===
- Glenn Murray
- Paul Nicholson
- Liam Miller

=== Head coaches ===
- (England) David Irving (1998–2014)
- (United States) Carson Porter (2014–2015)
- (England) Mark Briggs (2015–2016)

== Achievements ==
- USL PRO Championship Finalist 2012
- USL Second Division Regular Season Champions 2009
- USL Pro Select League Champions 2003
- USL D-3 Pro League Southern Division Champions 2002
- USL D-3 Pro League Southern Division Champions 2001

== Record ==
=== Year-by-year ===
Year	Division	League	Reg. season	Playoffs	Open Cup	Avg Attendance
1996	3	USISL Pro League	3rd, South Atlantic	Semifinals	did not qualify	1,310
1997	3	USISL D-3 Pro League	5th, South Atlantic	did not qualify	1st Round	1,146
1998	3	USISL D-3 Pro League	6th, Atlantic	Division Semifinals	did not qualify	778
1999	3	USL D-3 Pro League	2nd, Atlantic	Conference Finals	2nd Round	1,208
2000	3	USL D-3 Pro League	2nd, Southern	Conference Quarterfinals	2nd Round	1,506
2001	3	USL D-3 Pro League	1st, Southern	Conference Finals	did not qualify	2,312
2002	3	USL D-3 Pro League	1st, Southern	Final	did not qualify	2,554 (Note: Top attendance in league.)
2003	3	USL Pro Select League	2nd, Southern	Champion	Quarterfinals	2,829
2004	3	USL Pro Soccer League	2nd, Southern	Quarterfinals	3rd Round	2,270
2005	3	USL Second Division	4th	Semifinals	3rd Round	3,317
2006	3	USL Second Division	8th	did not qualify	4th Round	3,072
2007	3	USL Second Division	7th	did not qualify	did not qualify	2,978
2008	3	USL Second Division	7th	did not qualify	did not qualify	2,577
2009	3	USL Second Division	1st	Semifinals	Quarterfinals	2,467
2010	On Hiatus					
2011	3	USL Pro	2nd, American	Division Semifinals	3rd Round	4,053
2012	3	USL Pro	5th	Championship	3rd Round	4,265
2013	3	USL Pro	9th	did not qualify	3rd Round	3,162
2014	3	USL Pro	7th	Quarterfinals	2nd Round	2,326
2015	3	USL	12th, Eastern	did not qualify	2nd Round	2,960
2016	3	USL	9th, Eastern	did not qualify	4th Round	3,000
2017	4	USL PDL	8th, South Atlantic	did not qualify	did not qualify	—

== Supporters ==
The primary supporters group was the Port City Firm. The group was founded in 1997 and stuck together during the team's hiatus year in 2010.
