= Ryshiem Henderson =

American soccer player

Personal information
- Place of birth: Philadelphia, Pennsylvania, United States
- Height: 6 ft 3 in (1.91 m)
- Position: Forward

College career
Years	Team	Apps	(Gls)
1990–1994	Cal Poly Mustangs		

Senior career*
Years	Team	Apps	(Gls)
1996	California Jaguars		(5)
1996	San Jose Clash	3	(0)
1998	San Francisco Bay Seals	17	(8)
- * Club domestic league appearances and goals

Ryshiem Henderson is an American former professional soccer player who played as a forward. Henderson played at least two seasons in USISL and three games in Major League Soccer with the San Jose Clash.

== Early life ==
Henderson attended Blackford High School where he was an outstanding prep soccer forward and football defensive back. In 1990, he played in the annual Silicon Valley Youth Classic football game.

== College career ==
Henderson then played college soccer at Cal Poly San Luis Obispo from 1990–91 to 1994–95. He graduated with a bachelor's degree in economics.

As a freshman in 1990, he was selected to the All-CCAA Second Team. Then as a sophomore, he earned first-team all-conference status. Just prior to the final game of his college career, starring for Cal Poly's first squad at the Division I level, Henderson suffered a tear to the anterior cruciate ligament in his left knee. The injury required a replacement of his ACL.

Collegiate Statistics
Season	Goals
1990 (Fr.)	11
1991 (So.)	11
1992 (Inj./RS)	-
1993 (Jr.)	6
1994 (Sr.)	15
Totals	43

== Professional career ==
In 1995, Henderson traveled to Europe where he trained with the likes of FC Nurmberg and Bayern Munich of the German Bundesliga before returning to the U.S. In 1996, Henderson signed with the California Jaguars in the USISL, where he led them to their only National Championship as the top goal scorer. This led to his signing by the San Jose Clash. He joined the team prior to their 1996 playoff run.

He played a total of 78 minutes with the Clash before being placed on waivers on October 20, 1996, with nagging knee injuries. In 1998, he played for the expansion San Francisco Bay Seals. He retired from playing professionally in 1998 then entered the financial services sector.
