= John Garvey (soccer) =

American soccer player

Personal information
- Full name: John Garvey
- Date of birth: March 26, 1969 (age 57)
- Place of birth: Guilford, Connecticut, U.S.
- Height: 5 ft 10 in (1.78 m)
- Position: Forward

College career
Years	Team	Apps	(Gls)
1987–1990	Maryland Terrapins		

Senior career*
Years	Team	Apps	(Gls)
1991	Miami Freedom	8	(0)
1991	Albany Capitals	9	(4)
1992	San Francisco Bay Blackhawks	6	(1)
1992–1993	Milwaukee Wave (indoor)	13	(5)
1994	Carolina Vipers (indoor)	23	(2)
1994–1995	Wichita Wings (indoor)	29	(39)
1995	Myrtle Beach Boyz		
1995	Tampa Bay Terror (indoor)	10	(9)
1995–1996	Baltimore Spirit (indoor)	22	(23)
1996	Los Angeles Galaxy	13	(1)

International career^{‡}
1992	United States Futsal	1	(1)
- * Club domestic league appearances and goals as of 8 April 2009 ‡ National team caps and goals as of 8 April 2009

John Garvey (born March 26, 1969) is an American retired soccer player.

== Career ==
=== College ===
Garvey played college soccer at the University of Maryland from 1987 to 1990.

=== Professional ===
In 1991, following his graduation from Maryland, Garvey had a trial with Coventry City but was not offered a contract. He returned to the United States and signed with the Miami Freedom of the American Professional Soccer League. After eight games, he was traded to the Albany Capitals where he played in the 1991 APSL championship game. In 1992, he moved to the San Francisco Bay Blackhawks of the A-League, and on November 7, 1992, he signed with the Milwaukee Wave of the National Professional Soccer League (NPSL) for the 1992–1993 winter indoor season.

In the spring of 1994, he joined the expansion Carolina Vipers of the Continental Indoor Soccer League for the summer indoor season before returning to the NPSL that fall, this time with the Wichita Wings. In the summer of 1995, he played outdoors with the Myrtle Beach Boyz of the USISL. The Boyz folded at the end of the season. In June 1995, the Wings traded Garvey moved to the Tampa Bay Terror in exchange for Mike Britton. On January 17, 1996, the Terror traded Garvey to the Baltimore Spirit in exchange for Zak Ibsen.

On February 6, 1996, the Los Angeles Galaxy selected him in the 4th round (34th overall) in the 1996 MLS Inaugural Player Draft. He played thirteen games with the Galaxy during their debut 1996 season., before retiring from professional competition in 1997 at the age of 28.

=== International ===
In 1992 Garvey earned one cap, scoring one goal, with the U.S. National Futsal team.

=== Honors ===
Garvey was inducted into the Connecticut Soccer Hall of Fame in April 2014.
