= Raimo de Vries =

Dutch footballer

Personal information
- Date of birth: 10 June 1969 (age 57)
- Place of birth: Den Helder, Netherlands
- Height: 6 ft 2 in (1.88 m)
- Position: Midfielder

Youth career
- 1989–1992: Wake Forest

Senior career*
Years	Team	Apps	(Gls)
1993–1995	Raleigh Flyers	?	(?)
1996	Colorado Rapids	4	(0)
Total		4	(0)
- * Club domestic league appearances and goals

Raimo de Vries (born 10 June 1969) is a Dutch former professional footballer who played as a midfielder.

== Career ==
Born in Den Helder, de Vries played college soccer with Wake Forest, scoring 28 goals and making 15 assists between 1989 and 1992. De Vries began his professional career in 1993 with the Raleigh Flyers. He later spent one season in Major League Soccer with Colorado, making four appearances.

== Personal life ==
De Vries' son Jack is also a professional footballer.
