= Gabe Garcia =

American soccer player

Personal information
- Full name: Gabriel Garcia
- Date of birth: June 8, 1970 (age 56)
- Place of birth: Helotes, Texas, U.S.
- Position: Forward

Youth career
- 1988–1992: UNC Charlotte

Senior career*
Years	Team	Apps	(Gls)
1991	San Antonio Generals	16	(8)
1993–1994	Greensboro Dynamo	31	(11)
1995	Myrtle Beach Boyz		
1996	New Orleans Riverboat Gamblers		(6)
1997	Richmond Kickers	23	(5)
1998	Minnesota Thunder	26	(0)
1999	Lehigh Valley Steam	10	(1)
1999	Hershey Wildcats	4	(0)
- * Club domestic league appearances and goals

Gabriel Garcia is an American retired soccer forward who spent his entire career in the SISL and USISL. He won two USISL championships, both with the Greensboro Dynamo.

== Youth ==
Garcia attended UNC Charlotte where he played on the men's soccer team from 1988 to 1992. He was a 1991 second team All American. He finished his four seasons with 39 goals in 77 games. In October 2002, UNC-Charlotte retired Garcia's jersey at the halftime of the Duke-Charlotte soccer game.

== Professional ==
In 1991, Garcia, along with his twin brother Carlos, played for the San Antonio Generals during the SISL outdoor season. He scored eight goals in sixteen games that season. After graduation, they signed with FC Wiesbaden, a German 3rd division team but later moved back to Charlotte for lack of playing time. In 1993, he signed with the Greensboro Dynamo, winning the 1993 and 1994 USISL championships with the team. In 1995, he moved to the expansion Myrtle Beach Boyz. The team lasted one season, but did go to the playoff semifinals. In February 1996, the San Jose Clash selected Garcia in the 12th round (118th overall) in the 1996 MLS Inaugural Player Draft, but waived him in April 1996. He then spent the 1996 USISL season with the New Orleans Riverboat Gamblers. He moved again in 1997, this time to the Richmond Kickers. On April 6, 1998, he signed with the Minnesota Thunder. In 1999, he split the season between the Lehigh Valley Steam and the Hershey Wildcats.

Garcia and his brother currently own the El Chaparral Mexican restaurant chain in San Antonio, Texas.
