= Carolina Vipers =

Defunct indoor soccer team

- Founded: 1994
- Ground: Independence Arena; Charlotte, North Carolina
- Capacity: 9,475
- League: Continental Indoor Soccer League

The Carolina Vipers were an indoor soccer team based in Charlotte, North Carolina that played in the Continental Indoor Soccer League. They played only one season in 1994. Their home arena was Independence Arena.

The Vipers were owned by Felix Sabates and Carl Scheer, who also owned the Charlotte Checkers ECHL minor league hockey team during this era. After one season with lower-than-expected attendance, Scheer and Sabates sold the team back to the CISL.

The roster included: Tom Misuraca, Jimmy McGeough, Troy "Chopper" Edwards, Mark Lugris, Willie Files, Brad Davis, Chris Dunlap, Kurt Lehnert, John Ngando, Jesse Roberts, Brad Agoos, John Garvey, Bob DiNunzio, Kevin MacFarlane, Jimmy Fisher, Chip Sorrell and Yaro. The head coach was David Irving, and the trainer was Dan DelVecchio.

== Year-by-year ==
Year	League	Reg. season	Playoffs	Avg. attendance
1994	CISL	7th CISL 3–25	Did not qualify	3,034
