= Jason Willan =

American soccer player

Personal information
- Date of birth: September 9, 1971 (age 55)
- Place of birth: Menomonee Falls, Wisconsin, United States
- Height: 6 ft 0 in (1.83 m)
- Position: Midfielder

Youth career
- Milwaukee SC

Senior career*
Years	Team	Apps	(Gls)
1995–1998	Detroit Rockers (indoor)	89	(93)
1996–2001	Milwaukee Rampage	139	(32)
1998–2001	Milwaukee Wave (indoor)	83	(61)
1999–?	Croatian Eagles		
2003	Minnesota Thunder	26	(1)
- * Club domestic league appearances and goals

Jason Willan is a retired American soccer player who played professionally in the USL A-League and the National Professional Soccer League. He was the 1996 NPSL Rookie of the Year.

Willan graduated from Franklin High School. Growing up, he played for the Milwaukee Sport Club and Croatian Eagles. In 1995, Willan signed with the Detroit Rockers of the National Professional Soccer League. After scoring forty goals in thirty-four games, Willan was selected as the 1996 NPSL Rookie of the Year. Willan played for the Rockers until 1998. That year, he moved to the Milwaukee Wave. By that time, he was also playing outdoor soccer for the Milwaukee Rampage of the USL A-League. In October 1999, Willan was arrested for third drunk driving incident in a year. He was sentenced to 150 days confinement, forcing him to miss a handful of games for both the Wave and Rampage. However, the judge eventually allowed him a work-release program which allowed him to resume his career while also serving his jail time. Willan went on to play twenty-six games for the Rampage that season. In 2001, he played two games for the Rampage before being released by the team on May 5, 2001, for “conduct detrimental to the success of this franchise”. The Wave also released him after he appeared in only thirteen games, scoring only two goals during the 2000-2001 NPSL season. In 1999, Willan had begun to train and play with the Croatian Eagles of Milwaukee when not with his professional clubs. He would continue to do so until 2013. In 2003, he finished his professional career with the Minnesota Thunder of the USL A-League.
