= David Johnson (soccer, born 1984) =

American soccer player

Personal information
- Date of birth: January 16, 1984 (age 42)
- Place of birth: Riverside, California United States
- Height: 5 ft 11 in (1.80 m)
- Position: Midfielder
- 1997-2001: AGSS

Senior career*
Years	Team	Apps	(Gls)
2002–2005	Willem II	23	(0)
2005	LA Galaxy	6	(1)
2006	Chivas USA	1	(0)
2006	Colorado Rapids	1	(0)
2007	Puerto Rico Islanders	12	(0)
Total		43	(1)

International career
2001	United States U17	20	(6)
2003	United States U20	12	(4)
- * Club domestic league appearances and goals

David Johnson (born January 16, 1984) is a former professional American soccer player who played for LA Galaxy in the MLS.

== Career statistics ==
=== Club ===
Club	Season	League			Cup		Other		Total	
Club	Season	Division	Apps	Goals	Apps	Goals	Apps	Goals	Apps	Goals
Willem II	2002–03	Eredivisie	9	0	0	0	0	0	9	0
Willem II	2003–04	Eredivisie	12	0	0	0	0	0	12	0
Willem II	2004–05	Eredivisie	2	0	0	0	0	0	2	0
Willem II	Total		23	0	0	0	0	0	23	0
LA Galaxy	2005	MLS	6	1	0	0	0	0	6	1
Chivas USA	2006	MLS	1	0	0	0	0	0	1	0
Colorado Rapids	2006	MLS	1	0	0	0	0	0	1	0
Puerto Rico Islanders	2007	USL	12	0	0	0	0	0	12	0
Career total			43	1	0	0	0	0	43	1
