= Duane Robinson =

American soccer player (born 1968)

Personal information
- Date of birth: September 20, 1968 (age 58)
- Place of birth: Trenton, New Jersey, United States
- Height: 6 ft 1 in (1.85 m)
- Position: Forward

Youth career
- 1984–1986: Union Lancers
- 1986–1989: Adelphi University

Senior career*
Years	Team	Apps	(Gls)
1989	Frosinone – N.Y.	22	(19)
1990	Penn-Jersey Spirit	21	(10)
1993–1996	North Jersey Imperials	45	(40)
1997	New Jersey Stallions		

International career
1986–1989	United States U20		

Managerial career
- 1990–1994: Rider University (assistant)
- 1995–1996: Union County College
- * Club domestic league appearances and goals

Duane Robinson (born September 20, 1968) is a retired professional soccer forward who played in the American Professional Soccer League and the United States Interregional Soccer League. He was the 1990 # 1 overall pick of the Illinois Thunder of National Professional Soccer League. He also earned 10 caps with the United States Under – 20 National Team.

== High School and youth career ==
Robinson grew up in Trenton, New Jersey and graduated in 1986 from Notre Dame High School in Lawrenceville, New Jersey. Robinson recorded 24 goals his senior year leading Notre Dame to two Parochial A state titles, in 1984 and 1985. He was selected to the New Jersey State Olympic Development Team his senior year and was one of the top five recruits coming out of the state of New Jersey. The summer of his senior year he led his club team (Union Lancers) Union, New Jersey to the United States Youth National Championship (McGuire Cup) in St. Louis, Missouri scoring four goals and adding two assist in the final four. Robinson also represented the United States Under – 20 National team as a right back in World Cup qualifying play that summer in Trinidad and Tobago.

== College ==
After graduating high school in 1986, Robinson attended Adelphi University where he played forward for the men's soccer team from 1986 to 1989. During his four seasons with the Panthers he was one of the top three goal scores in the country, being named All New York 1987–1989 and 2nd Team All – America in 1988 and 1989. His senior year he was named the "Most Outstanding Athlete" at Adelphi University and was the MVP of the Senior Bowl. Robinson finished his career as the universities All – Time leading goal scorer and points leader, amassing 55 goals and 26 assist for 136 points. Over twenty five years later, his records still stand today. Robinson graduated in 1990 with a B.S. degree in Health and Physical Education.

== Professional career ==
After finishing his collegiate career Robinson embarked on a life as a soccer journeyman. Like many U.S. soccer players in the late 1980s and early 1990s moving from one failing indoor and outdoor club to another. In 1990–1991 he played in the American Professional Soccer League (APSL) for the Penn–Jersey Spirit, and was the team's leading goal scorer in their inaugural season. That winter he was the #1 overall pick of the Illinois Thunder of the National Professional soccer League (NPSL). He later starred for the North Jersey Imperials of the United States Soccer League being named to the All – Star team 3 times and leading the league in scoring in 1995. In 1997 with the start of Major League Soccer, Robinson was selected as a 1st round draft choice of the Metro Stars but decided to forgo the new league due to the financial constraints. He instead played for the New Jersey Stallions of the USISL.

== Coaching ==
In 1995, Robinson was splitting time playing overseas and in the (USISL) and as the Head Men's soccer coach at Union County College in Cranford, New Jersey. Robinson also spent time as the head coach at Teaneck High School and was the assistant coach at Rider University.

In 2004, Adelphi inducted Robinson into the school's Hall of Fame.

Robinson went on to earn his master's degree in Educational Administration and completed his Doctoral course work in Sports Marketing and Management at Temple University. He is currently a high school administrator at Steinert High School in Hamilton Township, Mercer County, New Jersey He resides in Bucks County, Pennsylvania with his wife Kimberly Robinson who have five children Kayla, Maximino, Cameron, Kirsti and Trey.
