= Carlos Garcia (American soccer) =

American soccer player

Personal information
- Full name: Carlos J. Garcia
- Place of birth: United States
- Position: Midfielder

College career
Years	Team	Apps	(Gls)
1988–1991	Charlotte 49ers		

Senior career*
Years	Team	Apps	(Gls)
1993	Greensboro Dynamo		
1995	Myrtle Beach Boyz		
1996	Carolina Dynamo		
1997	Richmond Kickers	18	(1)
1997	Houston Hurricanes		
1998	Southwest Florida Manatees		
1998	Houston Hurricanes		
- * Club domestic league appearances and goals

Carlos Garcia is an American retired soccer midfielder who played professionally in the USISL.

Garcia, along with his twin brother Gabe Garcia, attended the University of North Carolina at Charlotte, playing on the men's soccer team from 1988 to 1991.

He spent the 1995 season with the Myrtle Beach Boyz. In February 1996, D.C. United selected Garcia with the last pick (160th overall) of the 1996 MLS Inaugural Player Draft. United released him during the pre-season and he joined the Carolina Dynamo. In 1997, he played for both the Richmond Kickers and the Houston Hurricanes. In 1998, he began the season with the Southwest Florida Manatees before finishing it with the Hurricanes. He then retired and went into his family's restaurant business.
