= Dan Stebbins =

American soccer player (born 1969)

Personal information
- Date of birth: November 13, 1969 (age 56)
- Place of birth: Milwaukee, Wisconsin, United States
- Height: 5 ft 10 in (1.78 m)
- Position: Forward

College career
Years	Team	Apps	(Gls)
1987–1990	Notre Dame Fighting Irish	77	(11)

Senior career*
Years	Team	Apps	(Gls)
1991–1993	Milwaukee Wave (indoor)	49	(16)
1993–1994	Milwaukee Bavarians		
1994–1996	Milwaukee Rampage	?	(41)
1994–1995	→ Chicago Power (loan)	28	(15)
1997	Dallas Burn	1	(0)
1997	→ New Orleans Riverboat Gamblers (loan)	1	(0)
1997	Milwaukee Rampage	8	(2)
1998	Miami Fusion	24	(6)
1999	Milwaukee Rampage	26	(10)
1999	→ Chicago Fire (loan)	1	(0)
2000	Milwaukee Bavarians		
2000	Rochester Rhinos	6	(3)
2001	Milwaukee Bavarians		
2002	Rochester Rhinos	26	(2)
2003	Milwaukee Bavarians		
- * Club domestic league appearances and goals

Dan Stebbins (born November 13, 1969) is an American former soccer player who played as a forward. He spent three seasons in Major League Soccer and was the 1996 USISL league leading scorer and MVP.

== Youth ==
Stebbins graduated from Rufus King High School in Milwaukee, Wisconsin. He played collegiate soccer at the University of Notre Dame from 1987 to 1990. During his four seasons with the Fighting Irish, Stebbins scored 11 goals and added 4 assists in 77 games.

== Professional ==
In 1991, Stebbins signed as a developmental player with the Milwaukee Wave of the National Professional Soccer League. He became a regular with the first team during the 1992–93 season. In November 1993, he unexpectedly left the team a few days before the season opener. In the summer of 1993, Stebbins played for the amateur Milwaukee Bavarians as it went to the semifinals of the 1993 U.S. Open Cup. In 1994, he continued to play for the Bavarians, also known as the Bavarian Leinenkugel in honor of their sponsor, as the team went to the finals of the 1994 U.S. Open Cup.

On November 17, 1994, Stebbins signed with the Milwaukee Rampage of the USISL. The Rampage then sent him on loan to the Chicago Power for the 1994-1995 NPSL season. In 1995, Stebbins scored twenty goals for the Rampage. In 1996, he was a first team All Star, led the league in scoring and was the USISL MVP. On February 2, 1997, the Dallas Burn selected Stebbins in the first round (fourth overall) of the 1997 MLS Supplemental Draft. On April 8, 1997, thirty-eight minutes into the first game of the season, Stebbins tore the posterior cruciate ligament in his right knee. The Burn released him in March, but then signed him to a 30-day contract which they continued to renew into June. In June 1997, the Burn sent Stebbins on loan to the New Orleans Riverboat Gamblers of the USISL to get him into game fitness. He played one game for the Gamblers, then was released by the Burn a week later. On August 5, 1997, the Milwaukee Rampage signed him for the remainder of the 1997 season. He scored only two goals in eight regular season games, but added another seven goals in the playoffs as the Rampage won the USL A-League championship. In January 1998, the expansion Miami Fusion of the Major League Soccer signed Stebbins. He scored six goals in twenty-four games and was released in November 1998. On March 23, 1999, he signed with the Rampage for a third time. In September 1999, the Rampage loaned Stebbin to the Chicago Fire for one game.

On February 6, 2000, the Rampage traded Stebbins to the Rochester Rhinos in exchange for the Rhinos first and second round draft picks. Stebbins refused to move and rejoined the Milwaukee Bavarians instead. In August 2000, after the Bavarians were eliminated from the 2000 Lamar Hunt U.S. Open Cup, Stebbins joined the Rhinos. He scored three goals in six regular season games, then scored several playoff goals, including one in the Rhinos 3–1 victory over the Minnesota Thunder in the championship game. Stebbins returned to the Bavarians for the 2001 season. In 2002, he spent one more professional season with the Rhinos before returning to the Bavarians in 2003.

== Honors ==
In 2016, Stebbins was inducted into the Wisconsin Soccer Hall of Fame.
