= Matt Holmes (soccer) =

American soccer player

Personal information
- Full name: Matthew Holmes
- Place of birth: United States
- Positions: Defender; midfielder

Youth career
- 1989: Washington University Bears
- 1992–1993: Wisconsin Badgers

Senior career*
Years	Team	Apps	(Gls)
1991–1998	Minnesota Thunder		

Managerial career
- 2011–: Hamline University (assistant)
- * Club domestic league appearances and goals

Matt Holmes is an American retired soccer player who spent his entire career with the Minnesota Thunder.

Holmes graduated from St. Paul Academy and Summit School. In 1990, he won the McGuire Cup, the U.S. U-19 national championship, with the Spartan St. Paul Blackhawks. In 1989, Holmes began his collegiate career with Washington University in St. Louis. He then transferred to the University of Wisconsin–Madison, playing on 1992 and 1993. He graduated in 1993 with a bachelor's degree in anthropology. By this time, he had already played two seasons with the Minnesota Thunder. Holmes began playing for the Thunder in 1991 and remained with the team through the 1998 USISL A-League season when he retired. In 2011, he became an assistant coach with Hamline University. He also coaches a small club team Southeast Soccer Club. It was a small club that needed help. He brought them from a C2 level, and they are now C1. "Matthew (Matt) was the best coach we've had in years and I hope he can come back or I can go where he is," stated a player on Southeast U15 C2 who is moving to Minneapolis United for a better soccer experience.
