= Flávio Ferri =

Brazilian footballer (born 1973)

Personal information
- Date of birth: September 14, 1973 (age 53)
- Place of birth: São Paulo, Brazil
- Height: 5 ft 11 in (1.80 m)
- Position: Forward

Youth career
- 1991–1994: University of the Incarnate Word

Senior career*
Years	Team	Apps	(Gls)
1993–1995	San Antonio Pumas		
1996	Austin Lone Stars		
1996–1997	Long Island Rough Riders	?	(6)
1998	Staten Island Vipers	27	(6)
1999	New York Freedom		

Managerial career
- 2005–2006: Long Island Rough Riders
- * Club domestic league appearances and goals

Flávio Ferri (born September 14, 1973) is a Brazilian retired soccer forward who spent several seasons in the USISL. He was the 1995 USISL leading scorer and MVP.

== Youth ==
The son of lower division Brazilian footballer, Ferri spent his early youth in Brazil. His family moved to Matawan, New Jersey, USA, before settling in Miami, Florida. Flavio attended the University of the Incarnate Word in San Antonio, Texas, where he enjoyed a stellar college sporting career in which he received several accolades including three-time All Conference selection, three-time All District selection, three-time All Region honors, two-time Conference MVP and two-time All American. Flavio was a 1992 NAIA third team and 1994 NAIA first team All American soccer player.

== Professional ==
In 1993, he began his professional career with the San Antonio Pumas of the USISL. In 1995, he led the USISL with 29 goals in 19 games, and was voted to the All-Star team where he earned the game's Most Valuable Player Award. In February 1996, the Tampa Bay Mutiny selected Ferri in the 10th round (97th overall) in the 1996 MLS Inaugural Player Draft. On March 26, 1996, the Mutiny waived Ferri before he had played a game. He began the 1996 season with the Austin Lone Stars before moving to the Long Island Rough Riders. He spent the 1997 season with Long Island and reached the national semifinals each year. Flavio then spent the 1998 season with the Staten Island Vipers. In 1999, he played for the New York Freedom in the Premier Development League. He then trained for six months with the UNAM Pumas in Mexico before retiring.

== Coaching ==
Following his retirement from playing, Ferri moved back to New York where he became a youth coach for the Blau-Weiss Gottschee club. In 1999, he joined Globall Soccer Concepts where he helped to develop one of the premier level soccer training organizations, training more than 70 travel soccer teams on Long Island. At Globall, Ferri helped to manage a training staff of more than 30 instructors who were primarily recruited from overseas. Apart from designing curricula for intramural-based clinics to advanced travel team sessions, Ferri also trained and coached high level travel teams, including one of the best known boys' teams in the East Meadow Soccer Club, the East Meadow Falcons. In 2006, Ferri took over the coaching and management responsibilities of the Long Island Rough Riders professional men's team that played in the 2nd division league in the United Soccer Leagues. During his professional coaching tenure with the Rough Riders, Ferri helped to restructure the men's soccer franchise while helping players with their professional careers, including Ruben Diaz (Puerto Rico Islanders USL 1), Rob Fucci (Crystal Palace Baltimore USL 2nd Division), Christopher Megaloudis (Red Bulls, MLS) Michael Grella (Leeds United, England 2nd Division) and Paul Robson (Crystal Palace Baltimore, England 2nd Division).

He is currently the vice president and general manager of the Rough Riders.
