= California Jaguars =

American soccer team

- Full name: California Jaguars
- Nickname: Jaguars
- Founded: 1995 (as Monterey Bay Jaguars)
- Dissolved: 1999
- Stadium: Salinas Sports Complex; Salinas, California
- Capacity: 17,000
- Owner(s): Robert Alderete, Enrique Garcia
- Manager: (United States) Mark Semioli
- League: USISL (1995–1996); USL A-League (1997–1998); USL D3 Pro League (1999)
| Away colors | colors |

California Jaguars were an American soccer team that played in Salinas, California, at the Salinas Sports Complex. The club joined the USISL in 1995 as the Monterey Bay Jaguars, but changed the name a year later. They played in the A-League in 1997 and 1998 seasons then moved to the USL D3 Pro League, later named the Pro Select League, in 1999.

== History ==
The Monterey Bay Jaguars were formed after their ownership group purchased the USISL Monterey County territory rights from Santa Cruz Surf owner Kevin Miliken.

After the Surf folded ahead of the 1995 USISL Pro League season, the Jaguars would split their inaugural home schedule between Santa Cruz and Monterey County, scheduling eight matches at Cabrillo College's Carl Connelly Stadium in Aptos and the remainder at Alisal High School's stadium in Salinas. The club performed well in 1995, but lost several players in the drafts ahead of the inaugural 1996 Major League Soccer season.

The Jaguars would fold ahead of the 2000 season, after having not attracted a strong enough fan base in their five years. They ultimately played at seven different home grounds across their tenure.

The Jaguars played three friendlies against UNAM Pumas recording a 2–2 tie at Gonzales High School, and losing the other two results in 1997 and 1998.

The team also hosted the San Jose Clash, in 1997 falling 3–1. One of the Clash goals was scored by former Jaguar Jeff Baicher.

== Year-by-year ==
| Year | Division | League | Reg. season | Playoffs | Open Cup |
|---|---|---|---|---|---|
| 1995 | 3 | USISL Pro League | 1st, Western North | Sizzling Nine | Did not qualify |
| 1996 | 2 | USISL Select League | 1st, Pacific | Champions | First Round, lost to San Jose Oaks 3-2. |
| 1997 | 2 | USISL A-League | 1st, Pacific | Division Semifinals | Did not qualify |
| 1998 | 2 | USISL A-League | 7th, Pacific | Did not qualify | Did not qualify |
| 1999 | 3 | USL D3-Pro League | 4th, Western | Did not qualify | Did not qualify |

== Coaches ==
- Greg Petersen: 1995
- Mark Semioli: 1995
- Joe Silveira 1996–1997 a former San Jose Earthquakes defender.
- Gaspar Silveira 1996–1997
- Carlos Volpini 1998
- Orlando Cervantes: 1999

== Key players ==
- Ramiro Corrales Joined the team in May 1995, after graduation from North Salinas High School, enjoyed a long MLS career.
- Paul Bravo Scored 19 goals during the 1995 season.
- Jeff Baicher Also scored 19 goals during the 1995 season.
- Mark Semioli Player coach in 1995, after Greg Petersen left to coach the Chico Rooks.
- Rhett Harty
- David Kramer Top goalkeeper in 1995.
- Tayt Ianni
- Francisco Gomez Local product from Watsonville High School, 1996 and 1997.
- Paul Holocher On the first Jag team in 1995, returned to team for two seasons after a year in MLS.
- Zak Ibsen Played for Jags after his MLS career.
- Chris Biason Local product from Carmel High School, the defender scored four goals in two campaigns (1995 and 1996).
- Mark Baena Team's leading scorer with 24 goals during 1997 season and part of 1998 before being sold to the Seattle Sounders.
- Kevin Rueda The team's top goalkeeper in 1996.

== Front Office ==
| Year | Name | Role |
|---|---|---|
| 1997 | (United States) Alejandro Gonzalez | General Manager |
