= Sacramento Scorpions =

The Sacramento Scorpions was a USISL American soccer team that played in Sacramento, California, in 1996 and 1997, before filing for bankruptcy in late 1997. During its brief existence, the team occasionally loaned players such as Gregg Vanney to MLS team LA Galaxy.

== Year-by-year ==
Year	Division	League	Reg. season	Playoffs	Open Cup
1996	2	USISL Select League	2nd, Pacific	2nd Round	Did not qualify
1997	3	USISL D-3 Pro League	2nd, West	Division Finals	Did not qualify
