= USL First Division =

Defunct men's soccer league in the United States

- Logo from 2005–2010
- Organising body: United Soccer League
- First season: 1996
- Folded: 2010
- Replaced by: USSF D2 Pro (temporary); USL Pro
- Country: United States
- Other club(s) from: Canada, Puerto Rico
- Confederation: CONCACAF
- Level on pyramid: 2
- Domestic cups: U.S. Open Cup; Canadian Championship
- Most championships: Rochester Rhinos (3)
- Most Commissioner's Cups: Montreal Impact (3)
- Most appearances: Mauro Biello (320)
- Top scorer: Eduardo Sebrango (100)
- Broadcaster(s): Fox Soccer

The USL First Division (USL-1) was a professional men's soccer league in the second tier of the United States league system. It was organized by the United Soccer League as its premier league for men from 1996 to 2010, above the USL Second Division. It began in the 1996 season as the Select League – consisting of 21 of the league's best third-tier clubs. It soon merged with the American Professional Soccer League to become the A-League in the 1997 season. It adopted its final name in the 2005 season, following a restructure of the USL.

A controversial sale of Nike's stake in the USL in 2009, along with general animosity between the league and club owners, led to several clubs seceding from the league to form the North American Soccer League (NASL). Amid the dispute, U.S. Soccer organized a mediatory second-tier league with the two warring groups of clubs in 2010. In the 2011 season, the NASL began play as a second-tier league, while the USL merged its First and Second Divisions into a new third-tier league, USL Pro.

Fostering competition between fifty clubs from the United States, Canada, and Puerto Rico over its fifteen seasons of play, eight clubs won the league's championship, with the Rochester Rhinos winning the most (3). Nine clubs won the league's regular season championship – the winners of which were presented the Commissioner's Cup between 2005 and 2009. The Montreal Impact won the most regular season championships (3). As members of the league, the Rhinos and Impact also won a U.S. Open Cup and Canadian Championship, respectively.

== History ==
=== Background ===
The origins of the A-League go back to 1986 and 1987 with the creation of three unrelated semi-professional soccer leagues. On the north-west coast, the Western Soccer Alliance (WSA), a summer outdoor league, emerged in response to the collapse of the North American Soccer League. In the southwest United States, the Southwest Indoor Soccer League was created in response to the upsurge in popularity of the Major Indoor Soccer League. Finally, in 1987, the Canadian Soccer League emerged with eight teams across Canada. While the SISL remained virtually unknown to the wider soccer community, the Western Soccer Alliance grew in popularity and inspired the creation of the third American Soccer League in 1988.

By the summer of 1989, these two leagues began considering a merger. At the same time, the SISL had grown to seventeen indoor teams and had added a summer outdoor schedule, known as the Southwest Outdoor Soccer League with included eight teams. In 1990, the WSA and ASL merged to form the American Professional Soccer League with twenty-two teams across the United States. At the same time, the SISL expanded to fourteen outdoor teams. In 1992, the SISL renamed itself the United States Interregional Soccer League (USISL) and had grown to twenty-one teams. By the 1993 season, the number of teams in the USISL had doubled to forty-two.

The mergers between all of these leagues continued in 1993 with the collapse of the Canadian Soccer League. This led to three Canadian teams, the Vancouver 86ers, Toronto Blizzard and Montreal Impact joining the American Professional Soccer League for the 1993 season. So by the summer of 1993, only two outdoor leagues competed for national attention in North America, the United States Interregional Soccer League and the American Professional Soccer League. However, by this time, the USISL was growing and the APSL was shrinking. In 1995, the American Professional Soccer League was down to six teams – two Canadian and four American. It also changed its name to the A-League. At the same time, the rapidly growing USISL had split its teams into two leagues, the fully professional Professional League and the semi-professional Premier League.

=== Foundation and merge with APSL (1996–2004) ===
Logos of the USISL / USL A-League.

In 1996, the USISL launched the Select League as its highest tier of three leagues. It debuted with 21 of its most successful clubs. With the creation of the Select League, the USISL now competed directly with the A-League for Division II recognition. This led the two leagues, the A-League which was made up the remains of the old Western Soccer Alliance, American Soccer League and Canadian Soccer League, and the USISL to enter merger talks. The creation of Major League Soccer in 1996 as an American Division I league also spurred the merger.

In 1997, six of the seven remaining A-League teams – Montreal Impact, Colorado Foxes, Seattle Sounders, Rochester Raging Rhinos, Vancouver 86ers and Atlanta Ruckus, plus two planned A-League expansion teams (Toronto Lynx and Hershey Wildcats) merged with the USISL Select League to form the USISL A-League, a consolidated American Division II league with twenty-four teams. In 1999, the USISL renamed itself the United Soccer Leagues (USL) which meant the league became the USL A-League.

=== Restructure (2005–2008) ===
The USL A-League was renamed the USL First Division (USL-1) in 2005, with 12 out of 16 teams returning from the previous season. The Seattle Sounders won the inaugural USL-1 championship, beating the Richmond Kickers on penalty kicks in the championship game after a 1–1 tie in regulation time. The Vancouver Whitecaps won the first of their two USL-1 titles in 2006 by beating the Rochester Raging Rhinos 3–0 in the championship game, while Seattle won their second title in 2007 by overcoming the Atlanta Silverbacks in a one-sided 4–0 final. Vancouver won their second USL1 championship in 2008 by beating the Puerto Rico Islanders 2–1 in the first USL-1 final to feature no American teams; the championship went north of the border again in 2009 when Montreal Impact won their first USL-1 title, beating Vancouver 6–3 on aggregate over two legs in the first all-Canadian affair.

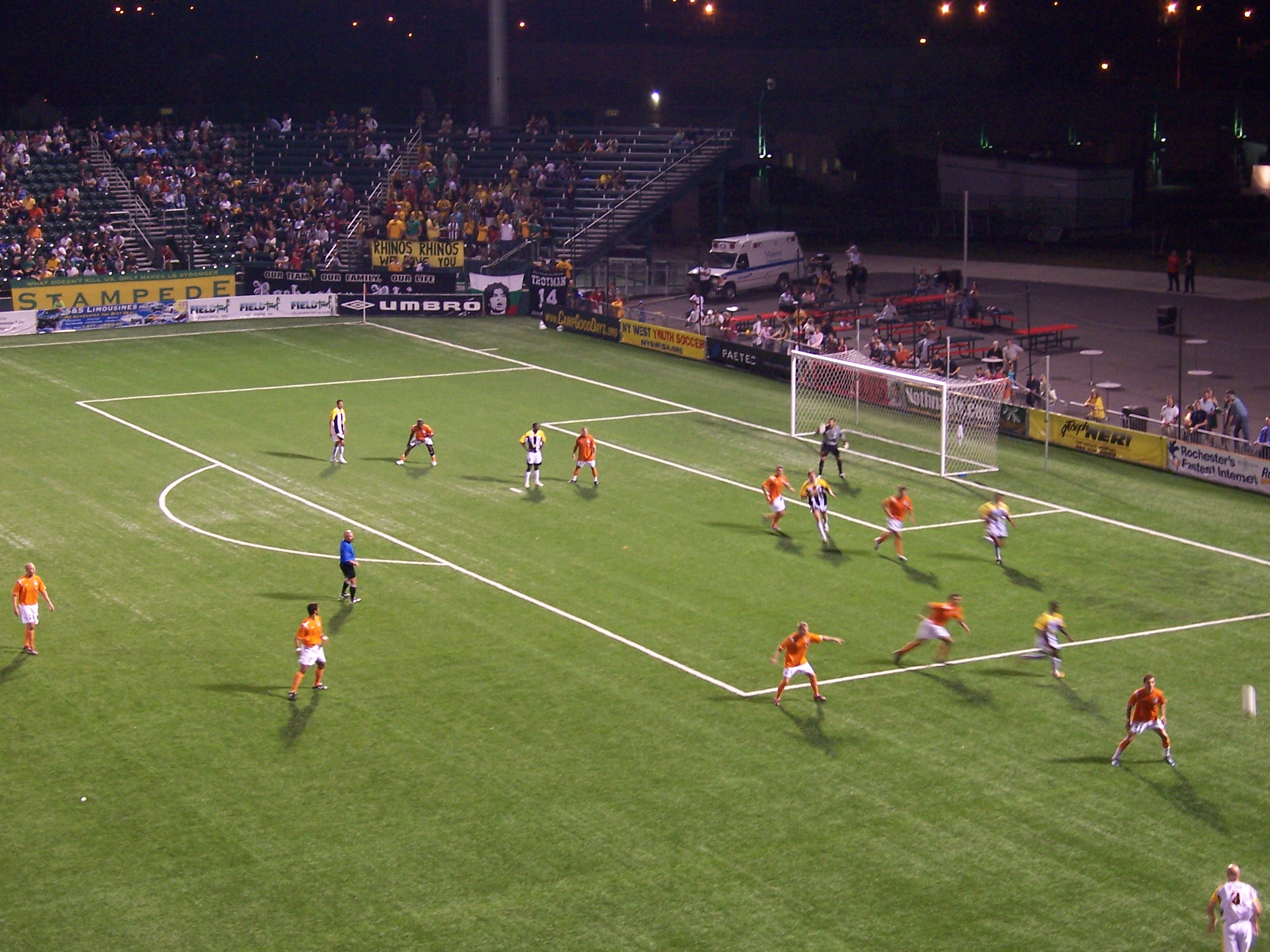
A scene during a Rochester Rhinos game against the Carolina Railhawks in the 2007 season.

Richmond was voluntarily relegated to the USL Second Division in 2006 to cut costs, Toronto was voluntarily relegated to the USL Premier Development League in 2007 because of MLS expansion, and on March 30, 2007, the Virginia Beach Mariners folded just prior to the start of the 2007 season due to an ownership dispute which left the team without financing. These teams were replaced by two new teams: the Carolina RailHawks from the Triangle region of North Carolina, playing out of Cary, and California Victory, a team in Northern California under the ownership of Dmitry Piterman (chairman of Spanish team Deportivo Alavés) which folded after the end of the 2007 season, having played only one season. On June 19, 2008, an announcement was made that an expansion slot had been awarded to a Tampa Bay, Florida-based franchise led by main investors Andrew Nestor (CEO) and Hinds Howard (chairman) of Citrus Ventures. The plan was for the club to join the league in 2010 and be named the Tampa Bay Rowdies.

In November 2008, the Atlanta Silverbacks announced that they would sit out the 2009 season to "reassess the landscape," and would possibly return at a future date. Similarly, the Seattle Sounders left prior to the 2009 season due to the imminent entrance of Seattle Sounders FC into Major League Soccer. Their spot in the league was taken by the Cleveland City Stars, who won the USL Second Division title in 2008, and voluntarily moved up to USL-1 for the 2009 season, folded at the end of the year.

Several cities had been mentioned as being locations where future USL-1 franchises might launch, including St. Louis, Missouri (led by the current USL Premier Development League (PDL) franchise St. Louis Lions); Orlando, Florida (with Mexican side Pachuca being rumored as connected to it); Milwaukee, Wisconsin; Detroit, Michigan; Hamilton, Ontario; San Antonio, Texas; and Ottawa, Ontario. On September 1, 2009, a group from Ottawa formally applied for USL-1 team, contingent on the approval of updates to Lansdowne Park. The team would share a field with the Ottawa Redblacks football team. The Ottawa group subsequently committed to the NASL.

=== NASL split and demise (2009–2010) ===
On August 27, 2009, Nike agreed to sell its stake in the United Soccer Leagues (USL) to Rob Hoskins and Alec Papadakis of Atlanta-based NuRock Soccer Holdings, instead of to the USL Team Owner's Association (TOA), a group comprising the owners of several USL First Division clubs. In the months that followed, several prominent TOA members began to voice their concerns about the state of the league in general, its management structure and ownership model, the leadership of USL president Francisco Marcos, and about the sale of the league to NuRock, which the TOA felt was counter-productive and detrimental to the development of the league. Within several weeks, a number of TOA member clubs threatened to break away from USL and start their own league; this break away became official on November 10, 2009, when the majority of USL-1 clubs, as well as one of the expected 2010 expansion franchises, applied to the United States Soccer Federation, the Canadian Soccer Association, and FIFA for approval to create a new North American Soccer League, reducing the league's membership to just three teams.

After lawsuits were filed and heated press statements exchanged, the United States Soccer Federation (USSF) declared they would sanction neither the NASL nor the USL First Division in 2010, and ordered both "camps" to work together on a plan to temporarily allow their teams to play a 2010 season. The interim solution was announced on January 7, 2010, with the USSF running the new USSF D2 Pro League comprising clubs from both USL-1 and NASL. On December 2, 2009, Inside Minnesota Soccer reported that the USL had asked the City Stars to terminate the contracts of all the players, as the franchise was to be dissolved. Posting an email addressed to all players under contract with the Cleveland City Stars and written by team president Jonathan Ortlip and executive director Aaron Tredway, the club executives went on to accept the decision to terminate the franchise.

All 12 teams from the USL First Division and the NASL competed in the USSF D2 Pro League in 2010, which was won by the Puerto Rico Islanders. On September 8, 2010, the USL announced the formation of USL Pro which would merge the USL First Division and USL Second Division to begin play in 2011. The merger is meant to consolidate USL's position within the American professional soccer landscape and focus on commercial growth and professional development of soccer in 4 main regions throughout the U.S., Canada, and the Caribbean. The First Division was formally dissolved following the completion of the temporary season to make way for USL Pro.

== Format ==
Unlike most other nations, there is no system of merit-based promotion and relegation in the American and Canadian pyramids, meaning that the champions of USL-1 could not move up to Major League Soccer and, similarly, the worst teams in MLS were not in danger of being demoted to USL-1. However, some USL-1 teams had in the past chosen to take voluntary relegation to a lower level of the USL system, often to reduce operating costs, while teams had also decided to move up to USL-1 after finding success at the lower levels.

The top seven teams advanced to the playoff tournament, with the Commissioner's Cup winner (regular season champion) receiving a bye into the semi-finals. Each round consisted of two legs, the lower seeded team hosting the first leg, and the higher seed hosting the second. Prior to 2009, the final was played as a single leg at the higher seed's stadium. After the first legs were completed, the lowest remaining seed played the Commissioner's Cup winner, and the higher seeds played each other. The highest remaining seed hosted the penultimate game of the Finals. The playoffs started the week after the completion of the regular season, and typically ended in mid-October.

== Teams ==
Champions in Bold

- Austin Aztex FC (2008–2010)
- Atlanta Silverbacks (1995–2008; as Atlanta Ruckus 1995–98) (Note: Moved to the North American Soccer League (NASL).)
- Boston Bulldogs (1997–2000; as Worcester Wildfire 1997–1998)
- Calgary Mustangs (2002–2004; as Calgary Storm 2002–2003)
- **California Jaguars** (1995–1998)
- California Victory (2007)
- Carolina Dynamo (1997)
- Carolina RailHawks (2007–2009) (Note: Played in the USSF Division 2 Professional League as an NASL Conference member.)
- **Charleston Battery** (1997–2009)
- Charlotte Eagles (2001–2003)
- Cincinnati Riverhawks (1998–2003)
- Cleveland City Stars (2009)
- Connecticut Wolves (1995–2001)
- Edmonton Aviators (2004)
- El Paso Patriots (1997–2003)
- FC Tampa Bay (2010)
- Hershey Wildcats (1997–2001)
- Indiana Blast (1999–2003)
- Jacksonville Cyclones (1997–1999)
- Lehigh Valley Steam (1999)
- Long Island Rough Riders (1997–2001)
- Maryland Mania (1999)
- Miami FC (2006–2009)
- **Milwaukee Rampage** (1997–2002)
- Milwaukee Wave United (2003–2004)
- **Minnesota Thunder** (1997–2009)
- MLS Project 40 (1998–2000)
- **Montreal Impact** (1995–2009)
- Nashville Metros (1997–2001; as Tennessee Rhythm 1999–2000)
- New Orleans Storm (1997–1999; as New Orleans Riverboat Gamblers 1997)
- New York Centaurs (1995)
- New York Fever (1996)
- NSC Minnesota (2010)
- Orange County Waves (1997–2000; as Orange County Zodiac 1997–99)
- Orlando Sundogs (1997)
- Pittsburgh Riverhounds (1999–2003)
- Portland Timbers (2001–2010)
- Puerto Rico Islanders (2004–2010)
- Raleigh Capital Express (1997–2000; as Raleigh Flyers 1997–98, and Raleigh Express 1999)
- Richmond Kickers (1997–2005)
- **Rochester Rhinos** (1997–2010; as Rochester Raging Rhinos 1997–2007)
- Sacramento Geckos (1998–1999; as Albuquerque Geckos 1998)
- San Diego Flash (1995–2001; as Colorado Foxes 1995–1997)
- San Francisco Bay Seals (1998–2000; as Bay Area Seals 2000)
- **Seattle Sounders** (1995–2008) (Note: Moved to Major League Soccer (MLS).)
- Staten Island Vipers (1998–99)
- Syracuse Salty Dogs (2003–04)
- Toronto Lynx (1997–2006)
- **Vancouver Whitecaps** (1995–2009; as Vancouver 86ers 1995–2000)
- Virginia Beach Mariners (1997–2006; as Hampton Roads Mariners 1997–2000, 2002)

=== Timeline ===
Active clubs Former Club USSF D2 Season (2010) Club moved to MLS Club moved to NASL Club moved to USL Club moved to USL 2nd Div or PDL Club on hiatus

== Seasons ==
†	Won a double

List of Select League / A-League / First Division seasons
Yr.	T	MP	Champion	Runners-up	Commissioner's Cup (Note: The Commissioner's Cup was not awarded from 1996 to 2004.)	Att.	Top goalscorer	Ref.
1996	21	18	California Jaguars	Richmond Kickers	Carolina Dynamo	—	(United States) Stebbins (21)	
1997	24	28	Milwaukee Rampage	Carolina Dynamo	Montreal Impact	—	(United States) Miller (23)	
1998	28	28	Rochester Raging Rhinos †	Minnesota Thunder	Rochester Raging Rhinos †	—	(United States) Baena (24)	
1999	30	28	Minnesota Thunder	Rochester Raging Rhinos	Rochester Raging Rhinos (2)	—	(United States) Baena (20) (Canada) Thompson (20)	
2000	25	28	Rochester Raging Rhinos (2)	Minnesota Thunder	Minnesota Thunder	—	(United States) Conway (17) (United States) Howes (17) (Liberia) Menyongar (17)	
2001	21	26	Rochester Raging Rhinos (3)	Hershey Wildcats	Richmond Kickers	—	(United States) Conway (22)	
2002	18	28	Milwaukee Rampage (2)	Richmond Kickers	Seattle Sounders	—	(Syria) Afash (18) (United States) Tennyson (18)	
2003	19	28	Charleston Battery	Minnesota Thunder	Milwaukee Wave United	—	(Brazil) Martins (22)	
2004	16	28	Montreal Impact	Seattle Sounders	Portland Timbers	—	(United States) Gordon (17) (United States) Washington (17)	
2005	12	28	Seattle Sounders	Richmond Kickers	Montreal Impact (2)	4,527	(Canada) Jordan (17)	
2006	12	28	Vancouver Whitecaps	Rochester Raging Rhinos	Montreal Impact (3)	4,667	(Brazil) Romário (18) (United States) Weaver (18)	
2007	12	28	Seattle Sounders (2) †	Atlanta Silverbacks FC	Seattle Sounders (2) †	4,420	(Canada) Gbeke (10) (France) Le Toux (10)	
2008	11	30	Vancouver Whitecaps (2)	Puerto Rico Islanders	Puerto Rico Islanders	5,164	(Brazil) Afonso (15)	
2009	11	30	Montreal Impact (2)	Vancouver Whitecaps	Portland Timbers (2)	4,720	(Canada) Gbeke (12)	

== Records ==
Goals scored
Rank	Player	Goals
1	(Cuba) Eduardo Sebrango	100
2	(United States) Mark Baena	86
3	(United States) Paul Conway	79
4	(United States) Doug Miller	77
5	(Canada) Mauro Biello	76
6	(Canada) Jason Jordan	70
7	(United States) Chance Fry	68
8	(Canada) Domenic Mobilio	65
9	(United States) Jamel Mitchell	64
10	(Trinidad and Tobago) Kevin Jeffrey	61

Games played
Rank	Player	Appearances
1	(Canada) Mauro Biello	320
2	(Canada) Nick DeSantis	245
3	(Jamaica) Lloyd Barker	242
4	(Canada) Nevio Pizzolito	228
5	(United States) Scott Jenkins	220
6	(South Africa) Lenin Steenkamp	219
7	(United States) Bill Sedgewick	218
8	(Canada) David Diplacido	217
9	(United States) Steve Klein	211

== See also ==
- MLS Reserve League (2005–2014)
- Women's United Soccer Association (2001–2003)
- Women's Professional Soccer (2009–2011)
