= CF Montréal–Vancouver Whitecaps FC rivalry =

Canadian soccer rivalry

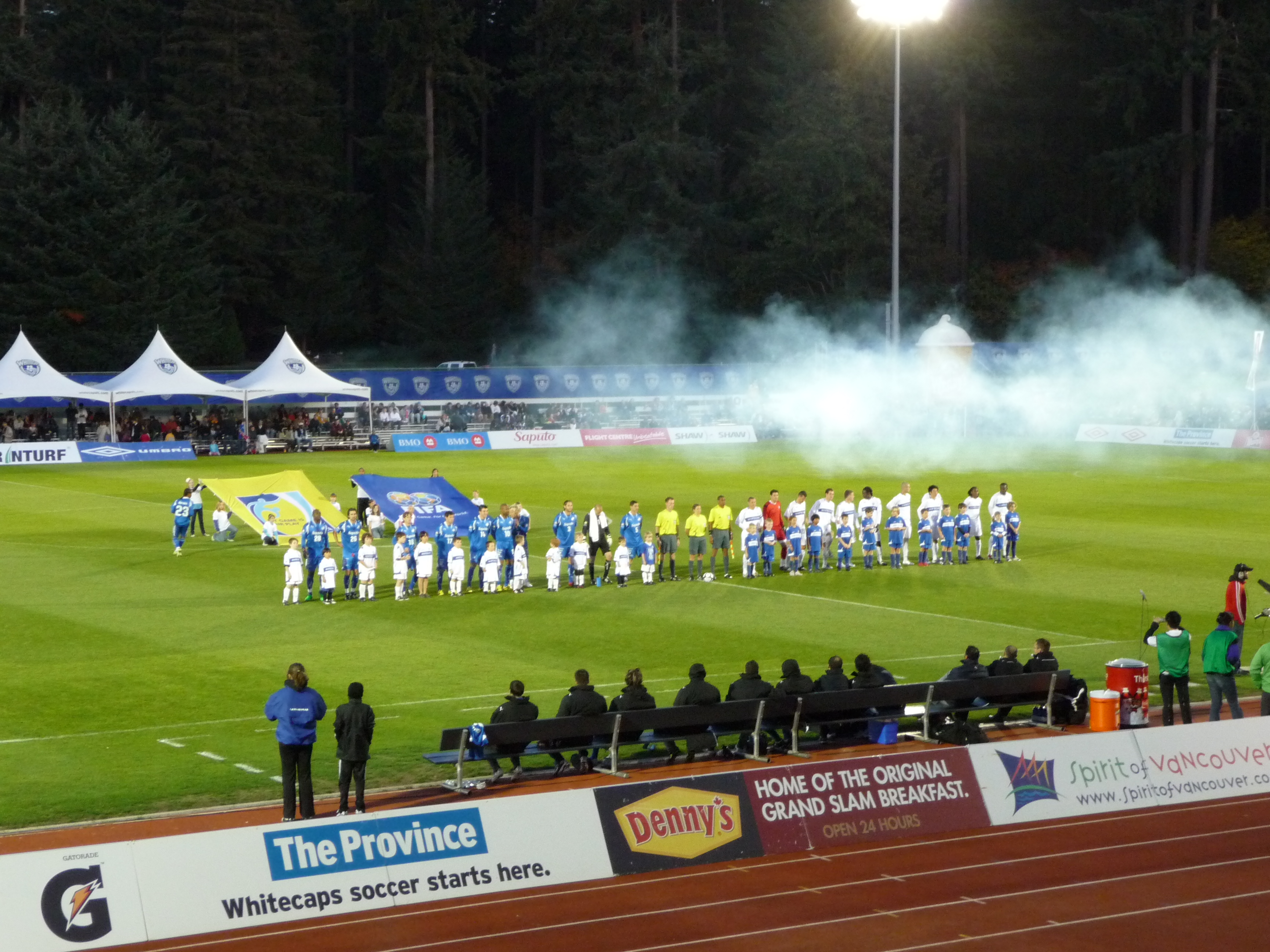
- 2009 USL–1 Finals between Vancouver and Montreal
- Other names: Montreal Impact–Vancouver 86ers rivalry (1993–1999); Montreal Impact–Vancouver Whitecaps FC rivalry (2000–2020)
- Location: Canada
- Teams: CF Montréal; Vancouver Whitecaps FC
- First meeting: May 30, 1993; APSL regular season Montreal 0–2 Vancouver
- Latest meeting: November 7, 2026; MLS regular season Montreal 0–2 Vancouver
- Next meeting: TBD
- Stadiums: Saputo Stadium, Montreal; BC Place, Vancouver

Statistics
- Total meetings: 81 (Note: League match results prior to 2005 are based on The A-League Archives, and may be incomplete.) (Note: Does not include friendlies.)
- Most wins: Montreal (35)
- All-time series: Montreal 35–28–18
- Regular season series: Montreal 27–20–11
- Postseason results: Montreal 3–2–1
- Longest win streak: 5 games Montreal (June 7 – October 17, 2009)
- Longest unbeaten streak: 11 games Montreal (July 17, 2002 – September 22, 2006)
- Current win streak: 1 game Vancouver (November 7, 2026 – present)
- Current unbeaten streak: 1 game Vancouver (November 7, 2026 – present)

Postseason history
- 2006 USL–1 semi-finals: Vancouver won 2–0 on aggregate; 2008 USL–1 semi-finals: Vancouver won 2–1 on aggregate; 2009 USL–1 final: Montreal won 6–3 on aggregate

The CF Montréal–Vancouver Whitecaps FC rivalry is a Canadian soccer club rivalry between CF Montréal and the Vancouver Whitecaps FC. Both teams play in Major League Soccer (MLS) since joining as expansion teams in the early 2010s, although their rivalry stems from seventeen years of competition in various American second division soccer leagues in the 1990s and 2000s. The rivalry began when both teams competed in the American Professional Soccer League (APSL), where they, alongside the Toronto Blizzard, were the only Canadian clubs in the league. The rivalry also intensified in 2002 when the Voyageurs Cup was established, which brought higher stakes in league fixtures between the two clubs. Since joining MLS, there have been significantly less matches played between the two as they are members of difference conferences, but they still meet somewhat frequently in the Canadian Championship, Canada's primary domestic cup tournament. Both Montreal and Vancouver also have fierce rivalries with fellow Canadian MLS team Toronto FC.

== Summary of teams ==
Both CF Montréal and the Vancouver Whitecaps FC are phoenix clubs that own the rights to the original clubs' history. The first Vancouver Whitecaps iteration played in the North American Soccer League from 1974 to 1984, and the second played in the Canadian Soccer League (CSL) and various second division American soccer leagues from 1987 to 2010. CF Montréal's predecessor club's first season was in 1993, and they also played in various second division American soccer leagues from 1993 to 2011, where the rivalry with Vancouver began. CF Montréal also own the rights to the Montreal Supra that played in the CSL from 1988 to 1992, but the club does not recognize the Supra's history as their own. The table below tracks the organizational history and name changes of both clubs starting from 1993.

| Montreal | | Vancouver | |
| Incarnation | Name(s) | Incarnation | Name(s) |
|---|---|---|---|
| APSL/USL (1993–2011) | Montreal Impact | APSL/USL (1993–2010) | Vancouver 86ers |
| APSL/USL (1993–2011) | Montreal Impact | APSL/USL (1993–2010) | Vancouver Whitecaps (2001) |
| APSL/USL (1993–2011) | Montreal Impact | APSL/USL (1993–2010) | Vancouver Whitecaps FC (2003) |
| MLS (2012–present) | Montreal Impact | MLS (2011–present) | Vancouver Whitecaps FC |
| MLS (2012–present) | CF Montréal (2021) | MLS (2011–present) | Vancouver Whitecaps FC |

== History ==
=== Second division era ===
==== Origins ====
CF Montréal and Vancouver Whitecaps FC have a long competitive history which started in 1993 when the clubs' lower league variants: the Montreal Impact and the Vancouver 86ers met for the first time in the APSL. The Vancouver 86ers had joined the league following the dissolution of the original Canadian Soccer League. The Montreal Impact were formed in 1992 after Joey Saputo, a Montreal businessman, purchased the assets of the Montreal Supra, and founded a new soccer club to play in the 1993 APSL season. The Montreal Supra and Vancouver 86ers did meet several times in the Canadian Soccer League, and there was no notable rivalry between them at first, as Vancouver was a much more prominent team which eliminated the potential for a competitive rivalry, and there was no intra-Canadian animosity in an exclusively Canadian league. However this would change in 1992 when the Vancouver head coach Bob Lenarduzzi took the Canada men's national team job. This coincided with Supra players being dropped from the national team in favour of 86ers players who previous played under Leonarduzzi. This contempt towards Vancouver would carry over into the 1993 Montreal Impact team, as many of the former Supra players and staff would find positions within the new APSL club.

==== Voyageurs Cup and Montreal dominance ====
In 2002, The Voyageurs supporters' group established the Voyageurs Cup which was created due to the Canadian Soccer Association not establishing their own domestic cup for professional Canadian soccer teams. Independent from the Canadian Soccer Association and the United Soccer League, the Voyageurs would award the trophy the Canadian team with the best regular season record in the USL A-League against other Canadian teams. Although the trophy was not recognized by any soccer governing body, having a trophy on the line raised the intensity in all intra-Canadian matchups, especially those between Montreal and Vancouver who were establishing themselves as two of the league's most dominent clubs. Montreal ended up winning the trophy every season from 2002 to 2007, helped by an eleven-game unbeaten streak against Vancouver that lasted from July 17, 2002 to September 22, 2006.

==== Playoff meetings and first Canadian Championship ====
The first playoff meeting between Montreal and Vancouver happened in 2006 in the 2006 USL First Division semi-finals. After a goalless draw in the first leg in Vancouver and a goalless 90 minutes back in Montreal, former Montreal Impact player Eduardo Sebrango finally put Vancouver in the lead with 5 minutes to go in extra time. Sebrango was then sent off (second booking) a moment later for an excessive goal celebration. Despite the numerical disadvantage, Vancouver scored again in the final minute to win 2–0 on aggregate. To add insult to injury, Montreal's home loss also ended their eleven-game unbeaten streak against the Whitecaps.

In 2008, Montreal and Vancouver would compete in the newly established Canadian Championship alongside Toronto FC for a place in the CONCACAF Champions League. Montreal would defeat Vancouver in both legs, and despite not being able to win a match against Toronto, were able to win the championship on total points. Both teams would also meet that season in the USL–1 playoffs. In the first leg, Vancouver's goalkeeper Jay Nolly was sent-off for a professional foul, leading to a 1–0 Montreal win. Despite Vancouver's loss, the team was praised for holding the Impact to a one-goal margin while playing half the match shorthanded. With full strength back in Vancouver, the Whitecaps won 2–0 through two first-half goals and advanced to the final, where they would win their second USL championship.

==== 2009 controversy ====
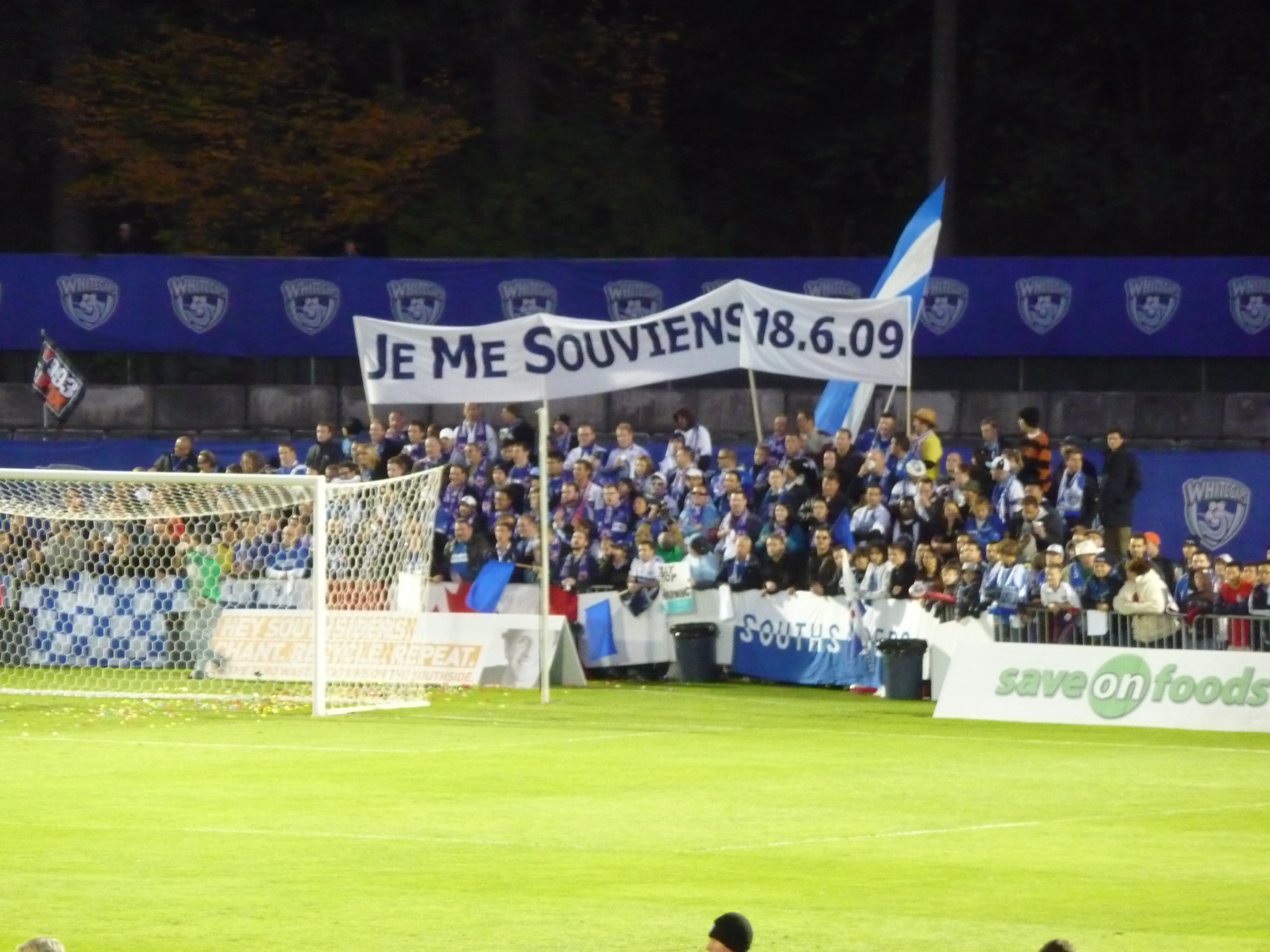
The Southsiders, a Whitecaps supporters group, with a Je me souviens banner referencing the events of June 18, 2009.

The 2009 season was a focal point of the rivalry, including several key placing matches and controversial coaching decisions. In that year's Canadian Championship, Vancouver would win three of their four matches, including two victories over the Impact. With Vancouver leading the round-robin table by three points, and a +4 goal differential, the Whitecaps would win the title unless Montreal lost their final match to Toronto FC by four or more goals. However on June 18, Montreal would lose their last match against Toronto by a score of 1–6, allowing Toronto FC to clinch the title. The popular theory among supporters of the Vancouver Whitecaps was that Montreal had deliberately thrown the match to eliminate Vancouver. This theory wasn't entirely baseless, as the Impact, who were already mathematically eliminated, had rested most of their main squad in the final match, which ultimately came to their advantage when Montreal utilized those fresh players in the league to defeat the Whitecaps two days later. The decision to rest those players also angered the supporters of Montreal, who believed that gaining the league advantage was not worth embarrassing themselves against their arch rivals, and was generally unsporting. The Montreal Ultras protested the coaching decision by not attending the first-half of the match against Vancouver on June 20.

At the conclusion of the regular season, Montreal and Vancouver placed 5th and 7th in the USL–1 standings with 44 and 42 points respectively. This made the league match on June 20 more controversial, as Montreal's win over the Whitecaps with their returning main squad would give the Impact home advantage in a potential post-season meeting with the Whitecaps. Both teams ended up making deep playoff runs to meet in the final for the USL–1 championship. This match would also be the first all-Canadian final in an American professional soccer league.

In the first game in Vancouver, the Whitecaps conceded an own goal in the first-half and lost their captain Martin Nash after he was sent-off early in the second-half. Despite the red card, the match remained competitive in an eventual 3–2 win for Montreal. The second match played in Montreal was much more one-sided, as Montreal scored three first half goals in an eventual 3–1 victory, winning the championship 6–3 on aggregate. Vancouver's performance was again marred by a red card, this time by Shaun Pejic who committed a professional foul in the 29th minute. The 2009 series gave Eduardo Sebrango his fifth USL championship title, winning two of them with Montreal (2004 and 2009) and two with Vancouver (2006 and 2008).

=== MLS era ===
Montreal's first match in the MLS was against the Vancouver Whitecaps FC (mirroring Vancouver's first MLS match against Canadian opposition Toronto FC) in an attempt to re-instigate the Canadian rivalry. Vancouver won the match 2–0.

Since both teams joined Major League Soccer, there have been less notable league and playoff fixtures as they play in different conferences. However they have still met several times in the Canadian Championship, including the 2013 and 2015 Canadian Championship finals.

On April 1, 2023, Vancouver defeated Montreal by a score of 5–0 in the MLS regular season, which broke the record for the largest margin of victory between the two sides. Later that season, Vancouver and Montreal would also play in the 2023 Canadian Championship final, with Vancouver winning 2–1.

== All-time results ==
As of November 7, 2026

| Competition | Matches | Wins | | Draws |
| Competition | Matches | MTL | VAN | Draws |
|---|---|---|---|---|
| APSL (1993–1996) (Note: League match results prior to 2005 are based on The A-League Archives, and may be incomplete.) | 16 | 8 | 6 | 2 |
| USL A-League/USL–1/D2 Pro (1997–2010) | 25 | 13 | 5 | 7 |
| MLS (2012–present) | 17 | 6 | 9 | 2 |
| League totals | 58 | 27 | 20 | 11 |
| USL–1 playoffs (2005–2009) | 6 | 3 | 2 | 1 |
| Playoff totals | 6 | 3 | 2 | 1 |
| Canadian Championship (2008–2010) | 6 | 2 | 2 | 2 |
| Canadian Championship (2011–present) | 11 | 3 | 4 | 4 |
| Domestic cup totals | 17 | 5 | 6 | 6 |
| Competitive totals | 81 | 35 | 28 | 18 |
| Friendlies (all formats) | 1 | 0 | 1 | 0 |
| All-time totals | 82 | 35 | 29 | 18 |

== List of matches ==
=== Competitive ===
==== APSL/USL era ====
Voyageurs Cup match

| Season | Competition | Date | Home team | Result | Away team | Venue | Series | Ref. |
|---|---|---|---|---|---|---|---|---|
| 1993 | American Professional Soccer League | May 30, 1993 | Montreal Impact | 0–2 | Vancouver 86ers | Complexe sportif Claude-Robillard | VAN: 1–0–0 | |
| 1993 | American Professional Soccer League | July 1, 1993 | Vancouver 86ers | 0–2 | Montreal Impact | Swangard Stadium | Tied: 1–1–0 | |
| 1993 | American Professional Soccer League | July 30, 1993 | Vancouver 86ers | 2–1 | Montreal Impact | Swangard Stadium | VAN: 2–1–0 | |
| 1993 | American Professional Soccer League | August 15, 1993 | Montreal Impact | 0–0 (Note: Montreal won 3–0 on penalties.) | Vancouver 86ers | Complexe sportif Claude-Robillard | VAN: 2–1–1 | |
| 1994 | American Professional Soccer League | August 14, 1994 | Montreal Impact | 4–1 | Vancouver 86ers | Complexe sportif Claude-Robillard | Tied: 2–2–1 | |
| 1994 | American Professional Soccer League | September 14, 1994 | Vancouver 86ers | 2–0 | Montreal Impact | Swangard Stadium | VAN: 3–2–1 | |
| 1995 | A-League | May 26, 1995 | Montreal Impact | 1–0 | Vancouver 86ers | Complexe sportif Claude-Robillard | Tied: 3–3–1 | |
| 1995 | A-League | June 18, 1995 | Vancouver 86ers | 3–1 | Montreal Impact | Swangard Stadium | VAN: 4–3–1 | |
| 1995 | A-League | July 12, 1995 | Vancouver 86ers | 0–1 | Montreal Impact | Swangard Stadium | Tied: 4–4–1 | |
| 1995 | A-League | August 9, 1995 | Montreal Impact | 2–3 | Vancouver 86ers | Complexe sportif Claude-Robillard | VAN: 5–4–1 | |
| 1995 | A-League | August 16, 1995 | Vancouver 86ers | 0–1 | Montreal Impact | Swangard Stadium | Tied: 5–5–1 | |
| 1995 | A-League | August 27, 1995 | Montreal Impact | 3–1 | Vancouver 86ers | Complexe sportif Claude-Robillard | MTL: 6–5–1 | |
| 1996 | A-League | June 16, 1996 | Montreal Impact | 1–1 (Note: Montreal won 4–2 on penalties.) | Vancouver 86ers | Complexe sportif Claude-Robillard | MTL: 6–5–2 | |
| 1996 | A-League | July 19, 1996 | Vancouver 86ers | 1–4 | Montreal Impact | Swangard Stadium | MTL: 7–5–2 | |
| 1996 | A-League | August 14, 1996 | Montreal Impact | 1–0 | Vancouver 86ers | Complexe sportif Claude-Robillard | MTL: 8–5–2 | |
| 1996 | A-League | August 21, 1996 | Vancouver 86ers | 1–0 | Montreal Impact | Swangard Stadium | MTL: 8–6–2 | |
| 1997 | USISL A-League | No matches played. | | | | | | |
| 1998 | USISL A-League | June 5, 1998 | Vancouver 86ers | 1–1 (Note: Montreal won 3–2 on penalties.) | Montreal Impact | Swangard Stadium | MTL: 8–6–3 | |
| 1999 | USL A-League | No matches played (Montreal on hiatus). | | | | | | |
| 2000 | USL A-League | August 18, 2000 | Montreal Impact | 1–0 | Vancouver 86ers | Complexe sportif Claude-Robillard | MTL: 9–6–3 | |
| 2001 | USL A-League | July 8, 2001 | Montreal Impact | 0–1 | Vancouver Whitecaps | Complexe sportif Claude-Robillard | MTL: 9–7–3 | |
| 2002 | USL A-League | July 17, 2002 | Montreal Impact | 2–1 | Vancouver Whitecaps | Complexe sportif Claude-Robillard | MTL: 10–7–3 | |
| 2002 | USL A-League | August 24, 2002 | Vancouver Whitecaps | 0–3 | Montreal Impact | Swangard Stadium | MTL: 11–7–3 | |
| 2003 | USL A-League | May 30, 2003 | Vancouver Whitecaps FC | 0–1 | Montreal Impact | Swangard Stadium | MTL: 12–7–3 | |
| 2003 | USL A-League | August 6, 2003 | Montreal Impact | 1–1 | Vancouver Whitecaps FC | Complexe sportif Claude-Robillard | MTL: 12–7–4 | |
| 2004 | USL A-League | June 11, 2004 | Vancouver Whitecaps FC | 0–3 | Montreal Impact | Swangard Stadium | MTL: 13–7–4 | |
| 2004 | USL A-League | August 6, 2004 | Montreal Impact | 0–0 (a.e.t.) | Vancouver Whitecaps FC | Complexe sportif Claude-Robillard | MTL: 13–7–5 | |
| 2005 | USL First Division | August 31, 2005 | Montreal Impact | 1–0 | Vancouver Whitecaps FC | Complexe sportif Claude-Robillard | MTL: 14–7–5 | |
| 2005 | USL First Division | September 11, 2005 | Vancouver Whitecaps FC | 0–1 | Montreal Impact | Swangard Stadium | MTL: 15–7–5 | |
| 2006 | USL First Division | July 7, 2006 | Montreal Impact | 1–1 | Vancouver Whitecaps FC | Complexe sportif Claude-Robillard | MTL: 15–7–6 | |
| 2006 | USL First Division | July 16, 2006 | Vancouver Whitecaps FC | 0–1 | Montreal Impact | Swangard Stadium | MTL: 16–7–6 | |
| 2006 | USL First Division Playoffs | September 22, 2006 | Vancouver Whitecaps FC | 0–0 | Montreal Impact | Swangard Stadium | MTL: 16–7–7 | |
| 2006 | USL First Division Playoffs | September 24, 2006 | Montreal Impact | 0–2 (a.e.t.) | Vancouver Whitecaps FC | Complexe sportif Claude-Robillard | MTL: 16–8–7 | |
| 2007 | USL First Division | June 1, 2007 | Montreal Impact | 0–0 | Vancouver Whitecaps FC | Complexe sportif Claude-Robillard | MTL: 16–8–8 | |
| 2007 | USL First Division | August 18, 2007 | Vancouver Whitecaps FC | 0–2 | Montreal Impact | Swangard Stadium | MTL: 17–8–8 | |
| 2008 | USL First Division | April 12, 2008 | Vancouver Whitecaps FC | 1–0 | Montreal Impact | Swangard Stadium | MTL: 17–9–8 | |
| 2008 | USL First Division | May 19, 2008 | Montreal Impact | 0–0 | Vancouver Whitecaps FC | Saputo Stadium | MTL: 17–9–9 | |
| 2008 | Canadian Championship | June 17, 2008 | Montreal Impact | 2–0 | Vancouver Whitecaps FC | Saputo Stadium | MTL: 18–9–9 | |
| 2008 | Canadian Championship | June 25, 2008 | Vancouver Whitecaps FC | 0–2 | Montreal Impact | Swangard Stadium | MTL: 19–9–9 | |
| 2008 | USL First Division | September 13, 2008 | Vancouver Whitecaps FC | 1–0 | Montreal Impact | Swangard Stadium | MTL: 19–19–9 | |
| 2008 | USL First Division Playoffs | October 3, 2008 | Montreal Impact | 1–0 | Vancouver Whitecaps FC | Saputo Stadium | MTL: 20–10–9 | |
| 2008 | USL First Division Playoffs | October 5, 2008 | Vancouver Whitecaps FC | 2–0 | Montreal Impact | Swangard Stadium | MTL: 20–11–9 | |
| 2009 | Canadian Championship | May 20, 2009 | Montreal Impact | 0–2 | Vancouver Whitecaps FC | Saputo Stadium | MTL: 20–12–9 | |
| 2009 | Canadian Championship | May 27, 2009 | Vancouver Whitecaps FC | 1–0 | Montreal Impact | Swangard Stadium | MTL: 20–13–9 | |
| 2009 | USL First Division | June 7, 2009 | Vancouver Whitecaps FC | 1–2 | Montreal Impact | Swangard Stadium | MTL: 21–13–9 | |
| 2009 | USL First Division | June 20, 2009 | Montreal Impact | 2–1 | Vancouver Whitecaps FC | Saputo Stadium | MTL: 22–13–9 | |
| 2009 | USL First Division | September 4, 2009 | Montreal Impact | 1–0 | Vancouver Whitecaps FC | Saputo Stadium | MTL: 23–13–9 | |
| 2009 | USL First Division Finals | October 10, 2009 | Vancouver Whitecaps FC | 2–3 | Montreal Impact | Swangard Stadium | MTL: 24–13–9 | |
| 2009 | USL First Division Finals | October 17, 2009 | Montreal Impact | 3–1 | Vancouver Whitecaps FC | Saputo Stadium | MTL: 25–13–9 | |
| 2010 | Canadian Championship | May 5, 2010 | Vancouver Whitecaps FC | 1–1 | Montreal Impact | Swangard Stadium | MTL: 25–13–10 | |
| 2010 | USSF D2 Pro | May 15, 2010 | Vancouver Whitecaps FC | 0–0 | Montreal Impact | Swangard Stadium | MTL: 25–13–11 | |
| 2010 | Canadian Championship | May 26, 2010 | Montreal Impact | 1–1 | Vancouver Whitecaps FC | Saputo Stadium | MTL: 25–13–12 | |
| 2010 | USSF D2 Pro | June 30, 2010 | Montreal Impact | 1–2 | Vancouver Whitecaps FC | Saputo Stadium | MTL: 25–14–12 | |
| 2010 | USSF D2 Pro | July 28, 2010 | Montreal Impact | 0–1 | Vancouver Whitecaps FC | Saputo Stadium | MTL: 25–15–12 | |
| 2010 | USSF D2 Pro | September 24, 2010 | Vancouver Whitecaps FC | 0–1 | Montreal Impact | Swangard Stadium | MTL: 26–15–12 | |

==== MLS/NASL split ====
In 2011, the Vancouver Whitecaps joined Major League Soccer while the Montreal Impact joined the newly created North American Soccer League. Because of this, they only met in that year's Canadian Championship semi-finals.

| Season | Competition | Date | Home team | Result | Away team | Venue | Attendance | Series |
|---|---|---|---|---|---|---|---|---|
| 2011 | Canadian Championship | April 27, 2011 | Montreal Impact | 0–1 | Vancouver Whitecaps FC | Saputo Stadium | 8,412 | VAN: 1–0–0 |
| 2011 | Canadian Championship | May 4, 2011 | Vancouver Whitecaps FC | 1–1 (a.e.t.) | Montreal Impact | Empire Field | 16,611 | VAN: 1–0–1 |

==== MLS era ====
In 2012, the Montreal Impact became an MLS team where they would once again meet the Vancouver Whitecaps in league fixtures.

| Season | Competition | Date | Home team | Result | Away team | Venue | Attendance | Series |
|---|---|---|---|---|---|---|---|---|
| 2012 | Major League Soccer | March 10, 2012 | Vancouver Whitecaps FC | 2–0 | Montreal Impact | BC Place | 21,000 | VAN: 1–0–0 |
| 2013 | Canadian Championship | May 15, 2013 | Montreal Impact | 0–0 | Vancouver Whitecaps FC | Saputo Stadium | 12,016 | VAN: 1–0–1 |
| 2013 | Canadian Championship | May 29, 2013 | Vancouver Whitecaps FC | 2–2 | Montreal Impact | BC Place | 18,183 | VAN: 1–0–2 |
| 2013 | Major League Soccer | September 21, 2013 | Montreal Impact | 0–3 | Vancouver Whitecaps FC | Saputo Stadium | 20,006 | VAN: 2–0–2 |
| 2014 | Major League Soccer | June 25, 2014 | Vancouver Whitecaps FC | 0–0 | Montreal Impact | BC Place | 21,000 | VAN: 2–0–3 |
| 2015 | Major League Soccer | June 3, 2015 | Montreal Impact | 2–1 | Vancouver Whitecaps FC | Saputo Stadium | 10,035 | VAN: 2–1–3 |
| 2015 | Canadian Championship | August 12, 2015 | Montreal Impact | 2–2 | Vancouver Whitecaps FC | Saputo Stadium | 12,395 | VAN: 2–1–4 |
| 2015 | Canadian Championship | August 25, 2015 | Vancouver Whitecaps FC | 2–0 | Montreal Impact | BC Place | 19,616 | VAN: 3–1–4 |
| 2016 | Major League Soccer | March 6, 2016 | Vancouver Whitecaps FC | 2–3 | Montreal Impact | BC Place | 22,120 | VAN: 3–2–4 |
| 2017 | Major League Soccer | April 29, 2017 | Montreal Impact | 1–2 | Vancouver Whitecaps FC | Saputo Stadium | 19,597 | VAN: 4–2–4 |
| 2017 | Canadian Championship | May 23, 2017 | Vancouver Whitecaps FC | 2–1 | Montreal Impact | BC Place | 16,831 | VAN: 5–2–4 |
| 2017 | Canadian Championship | May 30, 2017 | Montreal Impact | 4–2 | Vancouver Whitecaps FC | Saputo Stadium | 15,213 | VAN: 5–3–4 |
| 2018 | Major League Soccer | March 4, 2018 | Vancouver Whitecaps FC | 2–1 | Montreal Impact | BC Place | 28,837 | VAN: 6–3–4 |
| 2018 | Canadian Championship | July 18, 2018 | Montreal Impact | 1–0 | Vancouver Whitecaps FC | Saputo Stadium | 13,389 | VAN: 6–4–4 |
| 2018 | Canadian Championship | July 25, 2018 | Vancouver Whitecaps FC | 2–0 | Montreal Impact | BC Place | 19,267 | VAN: 7–4–4 |
| 2019 | Major League Soccer | August 28, 2019 | Montreal Impact | 2–1 | Vancouver Whitecaps FC | Saputo Stadium | 14,513 | VAN: 7–5–4 |
| 2020 | Major League Soccer (Note: 2020 MLS regular season games between Montreal, Vancouver, and Toronto also served as qualifying matches for the 2020 Canadian Championship.) | August 25, 2020 | Montreal Impact | 2–0 | Vancouver Whitecaps FC | Saputo Stadium | 250 | VAN: 7–6–4 |
| 2020 | Major League Soccer | September 13, 2020 | Vancouver Whitecaps FC | 2–4 | Montreal Impact | BC Place | 0 | Tied: 7–7–4 |
| 2020 | Major League Soccer | September 16, 2020 | Vancouver Whitecaps FC | 3–1 | Montreal Impact | BC Place | 0 | VAN: 8–7–4 |
| 2021 | Major League Soccer | May 8, 2021 | Vancouver Whitecaps FC | 2–0 | CF Montréal | Rio Tinto Stadium (Note: Vancouver played many of their 2021 home games at the Rio Tinto Stadium in Salt Lake City, Utah due to COVID-19 travel restrictions.) | 0 | VAN: 9–7–4 |
| 2022 | Major League Soccer | April 16, 2022 | CF Montréal | 2–1 | Vancouver Whitecaps FC | Saputo Stadium | 12,042 | VAN: 9–8–4 |
| 2023 | Major League Soccer | April 1, 2023 | Vancouver Whitecaps FC | 5–0 | CF Montréal | BC Place | 16,046 | VAN: 10–8–4 |
| 2023 | Canadian Championship | June 7, 2023 | Vancouver Whitecaps FC | 2–1 | CF Montréal | BC Place | 20,072 | VAN: 11–8–4 |
| 2024 | Major League Soccer | July 6, 2024 | CF Montréal | 1–1 | Vancouver Whitecaps FC | Saputo Stadium | 19,619 | VAN: 11–8–5 |
| 2025 | Major League Soccer | March 8, 2025 | Vancouver Whitecaps FC | 2–0 | CF Montréal | BC Place | 19,531 | VAN: 12–8–5 |
| 2026 | Canadian Championship | September 2, 2026 | Vancouver Whitecaps FC | 1–1 | CF Montréal | BC Place | 18,437 | VAN: 12–8–6 |
| 2026 | Canadian Championship | September 16, 2026 | CF Montréal | 2–1 | Vancouver Whitecaps FC | Saputo Stadium | 10,333 | VAN: 12–9–6 |
| 2026 | Major League Soccer | November 7, 2026 | CF Montréal | 0–2 | Vancouver Whitecaps FC | Saputo Stadium | 13,430 | VAN: 13–9–6 |

=== Exhibition ===
| Competition | Date | Home team | Result | Away team | Venue |
|---|---|---|---|---|---|
| 2012 Walt Disney World Pro Soccer Classic | February 24, 2012 | Vancouver Whitecaps FC | 3–0 | Montreal Impact | ESPN Wide World of Sports Complex, Bay Lake, Florida |

== Cup and post–season series results ==
=== USL First Division Playoffs ===
| Season | Round | Advanced | Score(s) |
|---|---|---|---|
| 2006 | Semi-finals | Vancouver | 2–0 on aggregate (a.e.t.) |
| 2008 | Semi-finals | Vancouver | 2–1 on aggregate |
| 2009 | Finals | Montreal | 6–3 on aggregate |

Most series wins: Vancouver (2–1)

=== Canadian Championship ===
| Season | Round | Advanced | Score(s) |
|---|---|---|---|
| 2011 | Semi-finals | Vancouver | 2–1 on aggregate (a.e.t.) |
| 2013 | Final | Montreal | 2–2 on aggregate (away goals rule) |
| 2015 | Final | Vancouver | 4–2 on aggregate |
| 2017 | Semi-finals | Montreal | 5–4 on aggregate |
| 2018 | Semi-finals | Vancouver | 2–1 on aggregate |
| 2023 | Final | Vancouver | 2–1 |
| 2026 | Semi-finals | Montreal | 3–2 on aggregate |

Most series wins: Vancouver (4–3)

== Honours ==
| Montreal | Competition | Vancouver |
Domestic league (D1)
| 0 | League championships | 5 |
| 0 | Regular season titles | 0 |
Domestic league (D2)
| 3 | League championships | 2 |
| 2 | Regular season titles | 0 |
Domestic cup
| 5 | Canadian Championship | 5 |
| 10 | Total aggregate | 12 |

== See also ==
- Canadian Classique
- Seattle Sounders–Vancouver Whitecaps rivalry
- Portland Timbers–Vancouver Whitecaps rivalry
