= 1996 A-League =

A-League
- Season: 1996
- Champions: Seattle Sounders (2nd title)
- Premiers: Montreal Impact (2nd title)
- Matches: 92
- Goals: 256 (2.78 per match)
- Best Player: (Jamaica) Wolde Harris, Colorado Foxes
- Top goalscorer: (United States) Doug Miller, Rochester Raging Rhinos (18 goals)
- Best goalkeeper: (Canada) Paolo Ceccarelli, Montreal Impact

The 1996 A-League season was the seventh and final season of the A-League. In 1997, the league merged to form the USISL A-League.

== Regular season ==
Pos	Team	Pld	W	SW	L	GF	GA	GD	Pts
1	Montreal Impact	27	17	4	6	40	18	+22	55
2	Colorado Foxes	27	14	2	11	55	33	+22	44
3	Seattle Sounders	27	12	4	11	35	25	+10	40
4	Rochester Rhinos	27	11	3	13	44	42	+2	36
5	Vancouver 86ers	27	10	3	14	38	38	0	33
6	New York Fever	27	6	3	18	30	40	−10	21
7	Atlanta Ruckus	22	3	0	19	14	60	−46	9

Rules for classification: 3 points for a win, 1 points for a shootout win, 0 points for a loss.

A significant number of postponed matches over the 1996 season by the Atlanta Ruckus, who underwent a change in ownership, ultimately forced the A-League to shorten the other teams' schedules by one match, reducing the total games played from 28 to 27. Atlanta's league position, in last place and already eliminated from the playoff contention, was not affected by the decision announced September 4, 1996. The Ruckus played a total of 22 games.

Each team had their head-to-head schedule with Atlanta shortened by one, maintaining a balanced head-to-head competition against each other. The 1996 regular season ended on September 14 with the top four regular season teams advancing to the playoffs.

== Playoffs ==
=== Bracket ===
Semifinals (best-of-3)
1	Montreal Impact	2	3	1
4	Rochester Rhinos	3	0	2
2	Colorado Foxes	0	2	0
3	Seattle Sounders	1	0	3

1996 A-League Final
4	Rochester Rhinos	0
3	Seattle Sounders	2

=== Semifinal 1 ===
September 19, 1996

Montreal Impact (QC)	2–3	Rochester Rhinos (NY)
Nick DeSantis (red card) 34:45'; Jason DeVos 50:31'; Lloyd Barker 56'	Report	Lenin Steenkamp 4'; Doug Miller 5'; Gustavo Villagra 71:33'

Complexe sportif Claude-Robillard, Montreal, Canada
Attendance: 3,691
September 21, 1996

Rochester Rhinos (NY)	0–3	Montreal Impact (QC)
	Report	Onandi Lowe 53:06'; Eddy Berdusco 56:00'; Mauro Biello 89:00'

Frontier Field, Rochester, New York
Attendance: 14,809
September 25, 1996

Montreal Impact (QC)	1–2	Rochester Rhinos (NY)
Mauro Biello 14:56'	Report	Rene Rivas 25:53' (pen.), 55'

Complexe sportif Claude-Robillard, Montreal, Canada
Attendance: 3,317

=== Semifinal 2 ===
September 19, 1996
7:00 PM MST

Colorado Foxes (CO)	0–1	Seattle Sounders (WA)
	Report	Niall Thompson 69'

Mile High Greyhound Park Denver, Colorado
Attendance: 2,134
September 22, 1996

Seattle Sounders (WA)	0–2	Colorado Foxes (CO)
Niall Thompson (yellow card) 49'; Wade Webber (yellow card) 73'	Report	Henrik Fig 31', 76'; Chris Sarver (yellow card) 32'; Jerome Watson (yellow card) 51'

Memorial Stadium, Seattle, Washington
Attendance: 3,102
September 25, 1996
7:00 PM MST

Colorado Foxes (CO)	0–3	Seattle Sounders (WA)
		Jason Farrell 27'; Niall Thompson 63', 70'

Mile High Greyhound Park Denver, Colorado
Attendance: 1,927

=== Final ===
October 6, 1996
4:00 PM PST

Seattle Sounders (WA)	2–0	Rochester Rhinos (NY)
Niall Thompson (yellow card) 10'; Joey Leonetti 71:20', 83:30'; Niall Thompson (red card) 87'	Report 1 Report 2	Tommy Tanner (yellow card) 27'; Yogi McKay (yellow card) 53'; Rene Rivas (yellow card) 87'

Memorial Stadium, Seattle, Washington
Attendance: 7,027
Referee: Esse Baharmast

== Points leaders ==
Rank	Scorer	Club	Goals	Assists	Points
1	(Jamaica) Wolde Harris	Colorado Foxes	17	8	42
2	(United States) Doug Miller	Rochester Rhinos	18	2	38
3	(Canada) Domenic Mobilio	Vancouver 86ers	14	4	32
4	(South Africa) Lenin Steenkamp	Atlanta Ruckus	9	5	23
5	(Denmark) Carsten Siersbaek	Colorado Foxes	7	8	22
6	(Canada) Eddy Berdusco	Montreal Impact	8	3	19
6	(Jamaica) Lloyd Barker	Montreal Impact	6	7	19
8	(United States) Jason Farrell	Seattle Sounders	6	5	17
9	(Canada) Mauro Biello	Montreal Impact	6	3	15
9	(Jamaica) Walter Boyd	Colorado Foxes	5	5	15
9	(Jamaica) Anthony McCreath	Colorado Foxes	5	5	15
9	(Canada) Hector Marinaro	Rochester Rhinos	4	7	15
13	(United States) Chance Fry	Seattle Sounders	6	2	14
13	(United States) Jorge Acosta	New York Fever	5	4	14

== Honors ==
- MVP: (Jamaica) Wolde Harris
- Leading goal scorer: (United States) Doug Miller
- Leading goalkeeper: (Canada) Paolo Ceccarelli
- Rookie of the Year: (Jamaica) Wolde Harris
- Coach of the Year: (Jamaica) Lorne Donaldson
- Defender of the Year: (Canada) John Limniatis
- Official of the Year: Kevin Skinner
- First Team All League
  - Goalkeeper: (Canada) Paolo Ceccarelli
  - Defenders: (Canada) John Limniatis, (United States) Wade Webber, (United States) Carlos Llamosa, (Brazil) Rene Rivas
  - Midfielders: (Canada) Nick DeSantis, (Canada) Martin Nash, (Jamaica) Anthony McCreath
  - Forwards: (Jamaica) Wolde Harris, (Canada) Domenic Mobilio, (United States) Doug Miller
