= 1995 A-League =

A-League
- Season: 1995
- Champions: Seattle Sounders (1st Title)
- Premiers: Montreal Impact (1st Title)
- 1996 CONCACAF Champions' Cup: Seattle Sounders
- Matches: 72
- Goals: 215 (2.99 per match)
- Best Player: (United States) Peter Hattrup, Seattle Sounders
- Top goalscorer: (United States) Peter Hattrup, Seattle Sounders (11 goals)
- Best goalkeeper: (United States) Marcus Hahnemann, Seattle Sounders

The 1995 A-League season was the sixth A-League season and first after being renamed from the American Professional Soccer League. The A-League was the de facto highest level of U.S. soccer (officially sanctioned U.S. second division) until Major League Soccer commenced the following year.

== Overview ==
The league had ended its 1994 season with seven teams and intended to expand to ten for the 1995 season with new franchises in Detroit and Atlanta. These plans were stymied when the Fort Lauderdale Strikers, Los Angeles Salsa and Toronto Rockets all folded. This left the league with only four teams. The addition of the New York Centaurs and Atlanta Ruckus gave the league six teams and allowed it to compete for another season.

Training camps opened in March and the season began on May 5, 1995, when the Vancouver 86ers defeated the Atlanta Ruckus. By the time the regular season ended on September 10, 1995, the Montreal Impact had topped the chart. However, they were eliminated in the first round of the playoffs by the Ruckus. Seattle defeated Vancouver in the first round, then defeated Atlanta in the final to take their first championship.

The league introduced a new scoring system for the regular season. As with previous years, no games ended in a tie. If the score was tied at the end of regulation, a penalty shootout would determine a winner. A win was worth three points, a shootout win two points, a shootout loss one point and a loss zero points.

== Regular season ==
Pos	Team	Pld	W	SW	SL	L	GF	GA	GD	Pts
1	Montreal Impact	24	16	1	1	6	47	27	+20	51
2	Seattle Sounders	24	13	5	2	4	40	24	+16	51
3	Vancouver 86ers	24	10	0	3	11	43	43	0	33
4	Atlanta Ruckus	24	5	8	1	10	29	41	−12	32
5	Colorado Foxes	24	7	1	6	10	35	41	−6	29
6	New York Centaurs	24	5	1	3	15	21	39	−18	20

Rules for classification: 3 points for win, 2 points for shootout win, 1 point for shootout loss, 0 points for normal time loss

== Playoffs ==
=== Bracket ===
Semifinals; Best-of-3
1	Montreal Impact	1(1)	3	0(1)
4	Atlanta Ruckus	1(2)	0	0(3)
2	Seattle Sounders	1	0(3)	-
3	Vancouver 86ers	0	0(2)	-

1995 A-League Finals; Best-of-3
4	Atlanta Ruckus	1(3)	0	1(1)
2	Seattle Sounders	1(1)	3	1(2)

=== Semifinals 1 ===
September 14, 1995
7:30 PM EST

Atlanta Ruckus (GA)	1–1	Montreal Impact (QC)
Tom Wurdack (red card) 43'; Lenin Steenkamp 71'	Report 1 Report 2	70' Lloyd Barker
Penalties
? (penalty missed) ? (penalty missed); Mo Suri (penalty scored); Michael Araujo (penalty scored) ? (penalty missed)	2–1	(penalty missed) ? (penalty missed) ? (penalty missed) ? (penalty scored) Lloyd Barker; (penalty missed) Tom Kouzmanis

Adams Stadium, Atlanta
Attendance: 2,114

September 17, 1995
1:30 PM EST

Montreal Impact (QC)	3–0	Atlanta Ruckus (GA)
Paulinho 31'; Lloyd Barker 44'; Lyndon Hooper 78'	Report 1 Report 2

Complexe sportif Claude-Robillard, Montreal, Canada
Attendance: 2,648

September 20, 1995
7:30 PM EST

Montreal Impact (QC)	0–0	Atlanta Ruckus (GA)
	Report
Penalties
Nick De Santis (penalty missed); Patrick Diotte (penalty missed); Tom Kouzmanis (penalty scored); Lloyd Barker (penalty missed)	1–3	(penalty scored) Staale Soebye; (penalty missed) Cato Solberg; (penalty scored) Brian Moore; (penalty missed) Mo Suri; (penalty scored) John Doyle

Complexe sportif Claude-Robillard, Montreal, Canada

The Atlanta Ruckus advance to the finals.

=== Semifinals 2 ===
September 15, 1995
7:30 PM PST

Vancouver 86ers (BC)	0–1	Seattle Sounders (WA)
Nico Berg (yellow card) 62'	Report	80' Gary Heale

Swangard Stadium, Burnaby, British Columbia
Attendance: 4,036

September 17, 1995
4:05 PM PST

Seattle Sounders (WA)	0–0	Vancouver 86ers (BC)
Dominic Kinnear (yellow card) 39'; Neil Megson (yellow card) 53'	Report	(yellow card) 32' Geoff Aunger
Penalties
Peter Hattrup (penalty scored); Neil Megson (penalty missed); Shawn Medved (penalty missed); Marco Rizi (penalty missed); Gary Heale (penalty scored); David Hoggan (penalty missed); Jason Dunn (penalty missed); Billy Crook (penalty scored)	3–2	(penalty scored) Geoff Aunger; (penalty missed) Sipho Sibiya; (penalty missed) Carl Valentine; (penalty missed) Steve MacDonald; (penalty scored) Paul Dailly; (penalty missed) Martin Nash; (penalty missed) Doug McKinty; (penalty missed) Nico Berg

Memorial Stadium, Seattle
Attendance: 4,339

The Seattle Sounders advance to the finals.

=== Final ===
October 1, 1995
4:00 PM EST

Atlanta Ruckus (GA)	1–1	Seattle Sounders (WA)
Greg Sheen (yellow card) 34'; Lenin Steenkamp 58'; Bruce Murray (yellow card) 69'; Michael Araujo (yellow card) 73'	Report 1 Report 2	77' Jason Dunn
Penalties
Staale Soebye (penalty scored); Michael Araujo (penalty scored); John Doyle (penalty scored)	3–1	(penalty scored) Neil Megson; (penalty missed) Peter Hattrup; (penalty missed) Shawn Medved; (penalty missed) Jason Farrell

Adams Stadium, Atlanta
Attendance: 4,312
Referee: Zimmerman Boulos

October 8, 1995
7:05 PM PST

Seattle Sounders (WA)	3–0	Atlanta Ruckus (GA)
Chance Fry (24:35), 85'; Jason Dunn (86:55)	Report 1 Report 2	(red card) 41' Michael Araujo

Memorial Stadium, Seattle
Attendance: 4,626
Referee: Esse Baharmast

October 12, 1995
7:05 PM PST

Seattle Sounders (WA)	1–1	Atlanta Ruckus (GA)
Jason Farrell 81'	Report	3' Staale Soebye
Penalties
David Hoggan (penalty scored); Peter Hattrup (penalty scored); Neil Megson (penalty missed); Dominic Kinnear (penalty missed)	2–1	(penalty missed) Staale Soebye; (penalty missed) Brian Moore; (penalty missed) Mo Suri; (penalty scored) John Doyle; (penalty missed) Lenin Steenkamp

Memorial Stadium, Seattle
Attendance: 5,115

The Seattle Sounders win the A-League title.

== Points leaders ==
Rank	Scorer	Club	Goals	Assists	Points
1	(United States) Peter Hattrup	Seattle Sounders	11	8	30
2	(England) Paul Dougherty	Montreal Impact	10	8	28
3	(Jamaica) Lloyd Barker	Montreal Impact	10	6	26
4	(United States) Chance Fry	Seattle Sounders	9	4	22
5	(Scotland) Paul Dailly	Vancouver 86ers	7	7	21
6	(Canada) Giuliano Oliviero	Vancouver 86ers	9	1	19
7	(Canada) Geoff Aunger	Vancouver 86ers	6	6	18
8	(Norway) Staale Soebye	Atlanta Ruckus	7	3	17
9	(Canada) Martin Nash	Vancouver 86ers	5	6	16
9	(South Africa) Lenin Steenkamp	Atlanta Ruckus	8	0	16
9	(United States) Jason Dunn	Seattle Sounders	5	6	16
12	(Canada) Grant Needham	Montreal Impact	5	5	15
12	(Brazil) Paulinho	Montreal Impact	6	3	15
14	(United States) Jeff Hooker	Colorado Foxes	7	0	14
15	(United States) Shawn Medved	Seattle Sounders	6	1	13

== Honors ==
- MVP: (United States) Peter Hattrup
- Leading goal scorer: (United States) Peter Hattrup
- Leading goalkeeper: (United States) Marcus Hahnemann
- Rookie of the Year: (Canada) Giuliano Oliviero
- Coach of the Year: (Germany) Lothar Osiander
- Defender of the Year: (United States) John Doyle
- Official of the Year: (Iran) Esfandiar Baharmast
- First Team All League
  - Goalkeeper: (United States) Marcus Hahnemann
  - Defenders: (United States) Robin Fraser, (United States) John Doyle, (United States) Steve Trittschuh
  - Midfielders: (United States) Dan Calichman, (England) Paul Dougherty, (Canada) Geoff Aunger, (United States) Peter Hattrup, (Canada) Giuliano Oliviero
  - Forwards: (Jamaica) Lloyd Barker, (Norway) Staale Soebye
