= Canada Soccer Player of the Year =

Annual award in Canadian soccer

- Sport: Soccer
- Awarded for: Best male and female Canadian soccer player
- Country: Canada

History
- First award: 1993
- First winner: Alex Bunbury
- Most wins: Christine Sinclair (14) (women); Atiba Hutchinson (6) (men)
- Most recent: Jonathan David (men); Vanessa Gilles (women)

The Canada Soccer Player of the Year award celebrates Canada's top male and female soccer players in recognition of their achievements with both the national teams and their respective clubs. Since 2007, voting has been conducted by Canadian coaches and media. Christine Sinclair currently holds the record for most awards, having been named Player of the Year a total of 14 times, including 11 consecutive years between 2004 and 2014.

== Player of the Year winners ==
Year	Male	Female	Ref.
2025	Jonathan David (3)	Vanessa Gilles (2)	
2024	Jonathan David (2)	Vanessa Gilles	
2023	Stephen Eustáquio	Jessie Fleming (3)	
2022	Alphonso Davies (4)	Jessie Fleming (2)	
2021	Alphonso Davies (3)	Jessie Fleming	
2020	Alphonso Davies (2)	Kadeisha Buchanan (3)	
2019	Jonathan David	Ashley Lawrence	
2018	Alphonso Davies	Christine Sinclair (14)	
2017	Atiba Hutchinson (6)	Kadeisha Buchanan (2)	
2016	Atiba Hutchinson (5)	Christine Sinclair (13)	
2015	Atiba Hutchinson (4)	Kadeisha Buchanan	
2014	Atiba Hutchinson (3)	Christine Sinclair (12)	
2013	Will Johnson	Christine Sinclair (11)	
2012	Atiba Hutchinson (2)	Christine Sinclair (10)	
2011	Dwayne De Rosario (4)	Christine Sinclair (9)	
2010	Atiba Hutchinson	Christine Sinclair (8)	
2009	Simeon Jackson	Christine Sinclair (7)	
2008	Julian de Guzman	Christine Sinclair (6)	
2007	Dwayne De Rosario (3)	Christine Sinclair (5)	
2006	Dwayne De Rosario (2)	Christine Sinclair (4)	
2005	Dwayne De Rosario	Christine Sinclair (3)	
2004	Paul Stalteri (2)	Christine Sinclair (2)	
2003	Pat Onstad	Charmaine Hooper (4)	
2002	Jason de Vos	Charmaine Hooper (3)	
2001	Paul Stalteri	Andrea Neil	
2000	Craig Forrest (2)	Christine Sinclair	
1999	Jim Brennan	Geraldine Donnelly (2)	
1998	Tomasz Radzinski	Silvana Burtini	
1997	Mark Watson	Janine Helland	
1996	Paul Peschisolido	Geraldine Donnelly	
1995	Alex Bunbury (2)	Charmaine Hooper (2)	
1994	Craig Forrest	Charmaine Hooper	
1993	Alex Bunbury	N/A	

== Canadian Youth Player of the Year ==
=== Canadian Young Player of the Year ===
Beginning in 2018, the Canadian Soccer Association began awarding only one youth player of the year award for each gender to a U20 player. In 2020, due to the COVID-19 pandemic, it was awarded to a U23 player instead. Until 2017, they had awarded two awards to each gender - one for a U17 and another for a U20 player.

Year	Male	Female	Ref.
2025	Luc de Fougerolles	Olivia Chisholm	
2024	Nathan Saliba	Olivia Smith (2)	
2023	Ismaël Koné (2)	Jade Rose (3)	
2022	Ismaël Koné	Simi Awujo	
2021	Theo Corbeanu	Jade Rose (2)	
2020	Tajon Buchanan (Note: Due to the COVID-19 pandemic, no U20 male national team matches were played, so the award was given to a U23 player)	Jade Rose	
2019	Jayden Nelson	Olivia Smith	
2018	Derek Cornelius	Jordyn Huitema	

=== U20 Player of the Year ===
Year	Male	Female	Ref.
2017	Kris Twardek	Jessie Fleming (3)	
2016	Ballou Tabla	Jessie Fleming (2)	
2015	Michael Petrasso (2)	Jessie Fleming	
2014	Michael Petrasso	Kadeisha Buchanan (2)	
2013	Dylan Carreiro	Kadeisha Buchanan	
2012	Doneil Henry	Sabrina D'Angelo	
2011	Ashtone Morgan	Amelia Pietrangelo	
2010	Ethan Gage	Jonelle Filigno (2)	
2009	Nana Attakora (2)	Chelsea Stewart	
2008	Nana Attakora	Jonelle Filigno	
2007	Asmir Begović	Sophie Schmidt	
2006	David Edgar	Jodi-Ann Robinson	
2005	Ryan Gyaki	Kara Lang	

=== U17 Player of the Year ===
Year	Male	Female	Ref.
2017	Alphonso Davies (2)	Jordyn Huitema	
2016	Alphonso Davies	Deanne Rose	
2015	Kadin Chung	Kennedy Faulknor	
2014	Ballou Tabla	Jessie Fleming	
2013	Marco Carducci (2)	Sura Yekka	
2012	Marco Carducci	Ashley Lawrence (2)	
2011	Bryce Alderson (2)	Ashley Lawrence	
2010	Bryce Alderson	Diamond Simpson	
2009	Russell Teibert (2)	Abigail Raymer	
2008	Russell Teibert	Monica Lam-Feist	
2007	Olivier Lacoste-Lebuis	Monica Lam-Feist	

== Canadian Futsal Player of the Year ==
In 2017, the Canadian Soccer Association began awarding an award to the top futsal player of the year (male or female).

Year	Player	Ref.
2025	Léa Palacio-Tellier	
2024	Loïc Kwemi	
2023	Safwane Mlah	
2022	Daniel Chamale	
2021	Joshua Lemos	
2020	Mohamed Farsi	
2019	Luis Rocha	
2018	Jacob Orellana	
2017	Nazim Belguendouz	

== Canadian Para Soccer Player of the Year ==
Year	Player	Ref.
2025	Duncan McDonald (2)	
2024	Duncan McDonald	
2023	Samuel Charron (4)	
2022	Samuel Charron (3)	
2021	—	
2020	—	
2019	Samuel Charron (2)	
2018	Damien Wojtiw	
2017	Jamie Ackinclose	
2016	Samuel Charron	
2015	Trevor Stiles	
2014	Liam Stanley (2)	
2013	Liam Stanley	
2012	Brendon McAdam	
