= 1994 American Professional Soccer League =

American Professional Soccer League
- Season: 1994
- Champions: Montreal Impact (1st Title)
- Premiers: Seattle Sounders (1st Title)
- Matches: 70
- Goals: 169 (2.41 per match)
- Best Player: (Brazil) Paulinho, Los Angeles Salsa
- Top goalscorer: (England) Paul Wright, Los Angeles Salsa (12 goals)
- Best goalkeeper: (United States) Marcus Hahnemann, Seattle Sounders

The 1994 season of the American Professional Soccer League (APSL) was the fifth in the history of the league, which was the top level of club soccer in the United States from 1990 to 1995. It was planned to be contested by eight teams in the U.S. and Canada and took place between July 1 and October 15, partially overlapping with the 1994 FIFA World Cup. The Tampa Bay Rowdies folded and the Toronto Blizzard were replaced by the Toronto Rockets, who were formed from the North York Rockets of the Canadian Soccer League. Two expansion teams, the Houston Force and Seattle Sounders, were also added.

The Force postponed their first two matches and played against the Los Angeles Salsa before the APSL revoked their franchise on July 22, 1994. The league cited financial issues that the ownership group were unwilling to address. The season continued with 20 regular season matches for each team, including new fixtures to replace Houston's schedule, and a two-round playoffs for the top four teams. The playoffs semifinals were played in a best-of-three format, with a 30-minute third match following the second leg and a penalty shootout if necessary. The third match was held on the same day as the second leg due to budget constraints.

== Regular season ==
Rank	Team	GP	W	L	WN	WE	WS	LN	LE	LS	GF	GA	GD	Pts
1	Seattle Sounders	20	14	6	14	0	0	4	1	1	38	16	+22	121
2	Los Angeles Salsa	20	12	8	10	1	1	5	1	2	36	22	+14	106
3	Montreal Impact (C)	20	12	8	10	0	2	7	0	1	27	18	+9	93
4	Colorado Foxes	20	12	8	9	1	2	8	0	0	26	26	+0	92
5	Fort Lauderdale Strikers	20	8	12	5	1	2	9	0	3	23	33	-10	72
6	Vancouver 86ers	20	7	13	6	0	1	11	1	1	25	41	-16	65
7	Toronto Rockets	20	5	15	5	0	0	15	0	0	14	33	-19	44

== Playoffs ==
=== Bracket ===
Semifinals; Best-of-3
1	Seattle Sounders	0	4	0(1)
4	Colorado Foxes	2	1	0(2)
2	Los Angeles Salsa	1	3	0(1)
3	Montreal Impact	2	0	0(2)

1994 APSL Final; Single match
4	Colorado Foxes	0
3	Montreal Impact	1

=== Semifinal 1 ===
September 29, 1994
7:05 PM MST

Colorado Foxes (CO)	2–0	Seattle Sounders (WA)
Ted Eck 12'; Bryan Haynes 77'

Mile High Stadium, Denver, Colorado
Attendance: 2,636

October 2, 1994
6:05 PM PST

Seattle Sounders (WA)	4–1	Colorado Foxes (CO)
Dick McCormick 19', 28'; Jason Dunn 71', 72'		67' Ted Eck

Memorial Stadium, Seattle, Washington
Attendance: 8,448

October 2, 1994

Seattle Sounders (WA)	0–0	Colorado Foxes (CO)
Penalties
Neil Megson (penalty missed); Gary Heale (penalty scored); David Hoggan (penalty missed); Dick McCormick (penalty missed); Jason Dunn (penalty missed)	1–2	(penalty missed) Kim Roentved; (penalty scored) Mark Santel; (penalty scored) Robert Lipp; (penalty missed) Ted Eck; (penalty missed) Jeff Hooker

Memorial Stadium, Seattle, Washington
Attendance: 8,448

=== Semifinal 2 ===
September 30, 1994

Montreal Impact (QC)	2–1	Los Angeles Salsa (CA)
Lloyd Barker 5' (Rizi); Jean Harbor 12'; Enzo Concina (yellow card) (yellow-red card) 69'	Report 1 Report 2	32' (pen.) Paulinho; (yellow card) (yellow-red card) 80' Arturo Velazco

Complexe sportif Claude-Robillard, Montreal, Quebec
Attendance: 1,961
Referee: Jose Farias

October 2, 1994

Los Angeles Salsa (CA)	3–0	Montreal Impact (QC)
Thor Lee 40'; Paulinho 78', 86'	Report

Titan Stadium, Fullerton, California
Attendance: 6,002

October 2, 1994

Los Angeles Salsa (CA)	0–0	Montreal Impact (QC)
	Report 1 Report 2
Penalties
Omid Namazi (penalty missed) ? (penalty missed) ? (penalty missed); Paulinho (penalty scored); Danny Pena (penalty missed); Yari Allnutt (penalty missed)	1 – 2	(penalty missed) Rudy Doliscat; (penalty missed) ? (penalty missed) ? (penalty scored) Lloyd Barker; (penalty missed) Gustavo Echevarria; (penalty scored) Patrick Diotte

Titan Stadium, Fullerton, California
Attendance: 6,002

=== Final ===
October 15, 1994
4:30 PM EST

Montreal Impact (QC)	1–0	Colorado Foxes (CO)
Jean Harbor 21', (yellow card) 75'	Report	(yellow card) 23' Iain Fraser; (yellow card) 38' Bryan Haynes; (yellow card) 41' Anthony McCreath

Claude-Robillard, Montreal, Quebec
Attendance: 8,169
Referee: René Parra (Canada)

MVP: Rudy Doliscat

== Points leaders ==
Rank	Scorer	Club	Goals	Assists	Points
1	(United States) Paul Wright	Los Angeles Salsa	12	3	27
1	(Brazil) Paulinho	Los Angeles Salsa	11	5	27
3	(United States) Chance Fry	Seattle Sounders	11	4	26
4	(United States) Jason Dunn	Seattle Sounders	10	3	23
5	(United States) Jean Harbor	Montreal Impact	8	4	20
6	(Canada) Dale Mitchell	Vancouver 86ers	5	9	19
7	(Canada) Domenic Mobilio	Vancouver 86ers	7	3	17
8	(United States) Ted Eck	Colorado Foxes	6	4	16
9	(Jamaica) Lloyd Barker	Montreal Impact	6	1	13
9	(United States) Jason Farrell	Seattle Sounders	3	7	13
9	(United States) Shawn Medved	Seattle Sounders	1	11	13
9	(Scotland) David Hoggan	Seattle Sounders	5	3	13
13	(United States) Chad Ashton	Colorado Foxes	3	4	10

== Honors ==
- MVP: (Brazil) Paulinho
- Leading goal scorer: (United States) Paul Wright
- Leading goalkeeper: (United States) Marcus Hahnemann
- Rookie of the Year: (United States) Jason Dunn
- Coach of the Year: (England) Alan Hinton
- First Team All League
  - Goalkeeper: (United States) Marcus Hahnemann
  - Defenders: (United States) Robin Fraser, (United States) Danny Pena, (United States) Neil Megson, (United States) Steve Trittschuh
  - Midfielders: (Brazil) Paulinho, (Canada) Dale Mitchell, (United States) Shawn Medved, (United States) Ted Eck
  - Forwards: (United States) Chance Fry, (United States) Paul Wright
- Second Team All League
  - Goalkeeper: (Canada) Pat Harrington
  - Defenders: (United States) Jeff Agoos, (United States) Billy Crook, (United States) James Dunn, (United States) Robert Lipp
  - Midfielders: (Canada) Nick Dasovic, (United States) Jason Farrell, (Scotland) David Hoggan, (United States) Dominic Kinnear
  - Forwards: (United States) Jean Harbor, (United States) Jason Dunn
