= McCreath =

McCreath is a surname. Notable people with the surname include:

- Anthony McCreath (born 1970), Jamaican footballer
- Finlay McCreath (born 1998), Scottish cricketer
- Nicholas McCreath (born 1978), Jamaican footballer
- Peter McCreath (born 1943), Canadian politician
- Ralph McCreath (1919–1997), Canadian figure skater

== See also ==
- Simone Badal-McCreath, Jamaican chemist and cancer researcher
