= Edoardo Reja =

Italian football manager (born 1945)

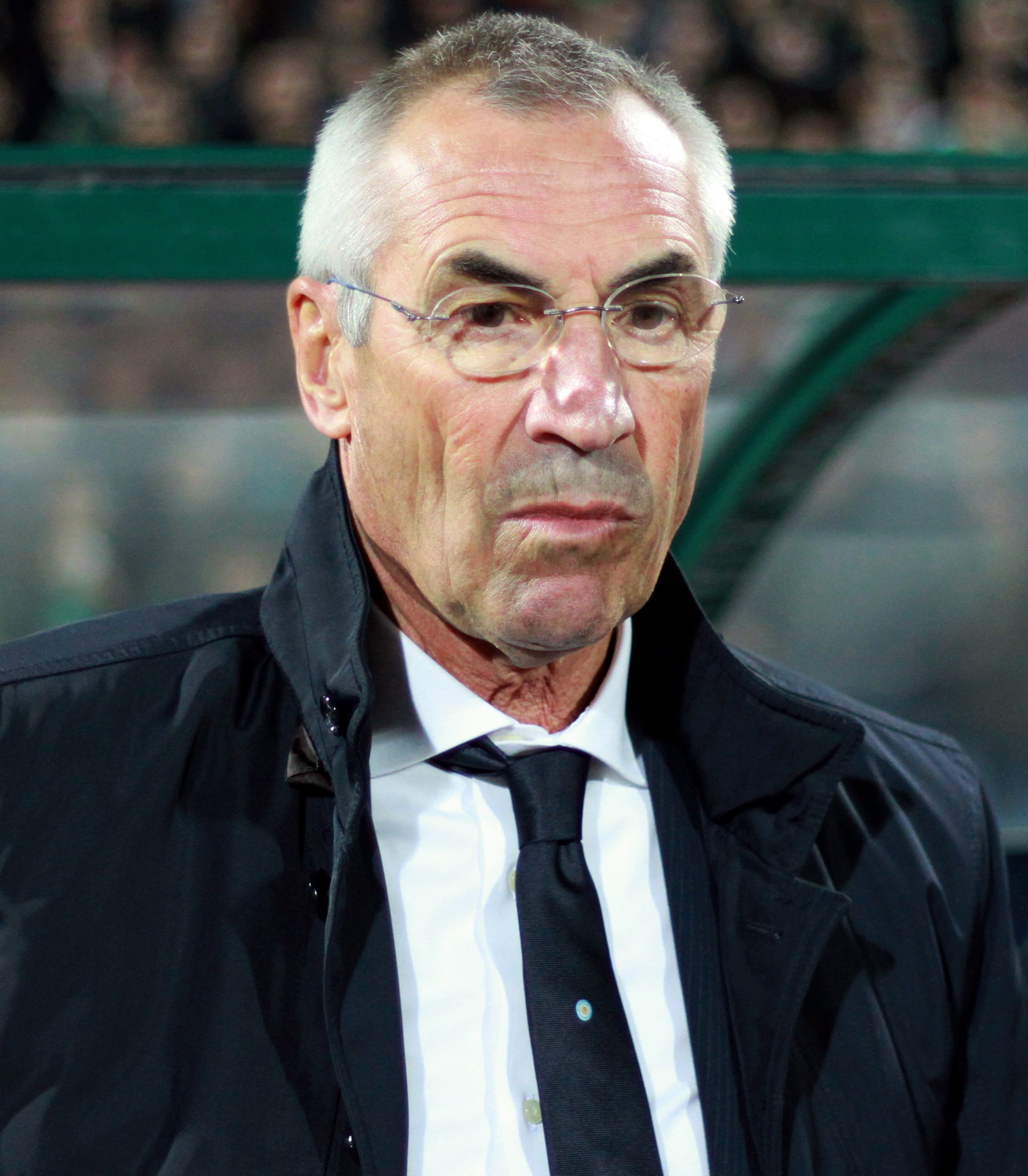
- Reja with Lazio in 2014

Personal information
- Full name: Edoardo Reja
- Date of birth: 10 October 1945 (age 81)
- Place of birth: Lucinico, Gorizia, Italy
- Height: 1.75 m (5 ft 9 in)
- Position: Midfielder

Youth career
- 1961: San Lorenzo di Mossa
- 1961–1963: SPAL

Senior career*
Years	Team	Apps	(Gls)
1963–1968	SPAL	70	(2)
1968–1973	Palermo	124	(1)
1973–1976	Alessandria	76	(1)
1976–1977	Benevento	7	(0)
Total		277	(4)

Managerial career
- 1979–1980: Molinella
- 1980–1981: Monselice
- 1981: Pordenone
- 1982–1983: Monselice
- 1983–1984: Pro Gorizia
- 1984–1985: Treviso
- 1985: Treviso
- 1985–1986: Mestre
- 1987: Varese
- 1987–1989: Pescara (youth team)
- 1989–1990: Pescara
- 1990–1992: Cosenza
- 1992–1993: Verona
- 1993–1994: Bologna
- 1994–1995: Lecce
- 1996–1997: Brescia
- 1997–1998: Torino
- 1999–2001: Vicenza
- 2001–2002: Genoa
- 2003: Catania
- 2003–2004: Cagliari
- 2005–2009: Napoli
- 2009–2010: Hajduk Split
- 2010–2012: Lazio
- 2014: Lazio
- 2015–2016: Atalanta
- 2019–2022: Albania
- 2023: Gorica
- * Club domestic league appearances and goals

Edoardo Reja (born 10 October 1945) is an Italian professional football manager and former player who was most recently the manager of Slovenian club Gorica.

After a career as a midfielder spent mostly with SPAL and Palermo, he began working as a manager. He won four promotions from Serie B, including as champions with Brescia (1997) and Vicenza (2000), as well as Cagliari (2004) and Napoli (2007).

Reja managed Vicenza, Napoli, Lazio and Atalanta in Serie A.

== Playing career ==
Reja began his career with the SPAL youth squad, coached by Paolo Mazza, playing in midfield alongside lifelong friend Fabio Capello, and other notable players such as Louis Pasetti and Adriano Zanier. Together, they helped the team win the 1963–64 Campionato Nazionale Primavera. In 1965, Reja joined Capello in Serie A, in the SPAL first team, earning an appearance with the Italian U-23 squad. Reja played for two more teams, US Città di Palermo and Alessandria in a long career that lasted until 1975, playing a total of 124 Serie A matches.

== Coaching career ==
=== Early career ===
Reja started his coaching career in 1979 serving as boss of Serie D team Molinella. Next year he then coached Monselice of Serie C2. In 1989, he coached his first Serie B team, Pescara, of which he was previously the youth squad boss. He successively gained good successes in the same league with Cosenza, Lecce and Brescia, where he won the championship. In fact, he launched the career of notable footballer Andrea Pirlo at Brescia, where Pirlo was a regular member of the squad. However, Reja opted to give up the opportunity to coach Brescia in Serie A, preferring to accept an offer from Torino, another Serie B team, where he then missed promotion defeated in the promotion playoffs to Perugia after a penalty shootout.

=== Serie A debut at Vicenza, Genoa, Catania and Cagliari ===
During the 1998–1999 season, he was appointed coach of Serie A club Vicenza, thus making his debut in a top division team, but was unable to save the team from relegation. Next year he remained at Vicenza and led his team back to Serie A, but promptly relegated one more time in 2001. In 2001–2002, he replaced Franco Scoglio at the helm of Genoa (Serie B), but to be fired himself only three months later. On 2002–2003, he was appointed in the mid-season by Catania boss Luciano Gaucci to replace John Toshack. In November 2003, he replaced Gian Piero Ventura at Cagliari and guided the rossoblu to second place in the Serie B and promotion to Serie A, but was not confirmed.

=== Napoli ===
In January 2005, Reja was appointed as the manager of Napoli, again after Ventura's dismissal. He led Napoli to win Serie C1, obtaining promotion to Serie B in 2006, then a second consecutive promotion to Serie A in 2007 – returning the Naples team to the top flight for the first time since 2001.

In his first Serie A campaign with Napoli, Reja guided them to an Intertoto Cup qualification spot, and was confirmed at the helm of Napoli in the 2008–09 Serie A season. He managed to lead the Partenopei to the second qualification round of the UEFA Cup, where they were defeated by S.L. Benfica. Napoli rose up to first place in the Serie A table in the first half of the season. After two points in nine games caused the team to fall into the bottom half, Reja was sacked on 10 March 2009, following a 0–2 home loss to Lazio, and replaced by former Italian team boss Roberto Donadoni.

=== Lazio ===
After a short successful spell as head coach of Croatian side Hajduk Split from August 2009 to February 2010, Reja opted to quit his job in Split in order to become the new manager of SS Lazio. He was unveiled as the new Lazio head coach the following day, replacing Davide Ballardini. He turned the fortunes of a club in dismay, guiding it out of the relegation zone and into a mid-table finish in the season.

The 2010–11 season for Lazio started in an astonishing way, with the team surprisingly heading Serie A with a four-point advantage to runners-up Inter after nine games, thanks to Reja's abilities in relaunching players such as Mauro Zárate, Cristian Ledesma and Stefano Mauri, as well as introducing new key signings such as Brazilian international Hernanes. On 17 May 2012 he resigned from the job, despite the president's pleas for him to stay on.

After the sacking of Vladimir Petković, Reja returned to Lazio for a second spell on 4 January 2014, completing the season in ninth place. On 12 June 2014, he resigned from his role, with Stefano Pioli appointed as his replacement the same day.

=== Atalanta ===
Reja was appointed trainer of Atalanta on 4 March 2015 with the team three points above the relegation zone after the dismissal of Stefano Colantuono. His time at the club ended in May 2016, having saved them twice from relegation.

=== Albania ===
On 17 April 2019, Albania signed Reja to a seven-month contract after fellow Italian Christian Panucci was dismissed the previous month.

=== Gorica ===
On 2 March 2023, just a few months after the end of his contract with the Albania national team, Reja returned into management as the new head coach of Slovenian PrvaLiga bottom-placed club ND Gorica. On 17 April 2023, after only seven games in charge, his contract with Gorica was mutually terminated.

== Personal life ==
Reja was born in the village of Lucinico (Slovene: Ločnik), now a suburb of Gorizia (Slovene: Gorica), near the border between Italy and Slovenia. His father was a Slovenian from the village of Vipolže in Brda, Slovenia, while his mother was Friulian. He is fluent in Italian, Slovenian, and Friulan. However, his levels of fluency vary: while he is able to speak the standard form of Italian, he only speaks a regional variety of Slovenian, strongly influenced by his native Brda dialect.

He is close friends with Fabio Capello. Reja has been married to his wife Livia since 1969; he met his wife while rooming with Capello in Ferrara, at the time playing for SPAL.

== Managerial statistics ==
As of match played 14 April 2023

Managerial record by team and tenure
Team	Nat.	From	To	Record				
Team	Nat.	From	To	G	W	D	L	Win %
Pordenone	(Italy)	1 July 1981	23 November 1981	14	2	7	5	14.29
Monselice	(Italy)	1 July 1982	30 June 1983	40	11	10	19	27.50
Pro Gorizia	(Italy)	7 July 1983	30 June 1984	40	9	13	18	22.50
Treviso	(Italy)	30 June 1984	25 February 1985	27	5	11	11	18.52
Treviso	(Italy)	15 April 1985	12 June 1985	7	0	2	5	0.00
Mestre	(Italy)	23 November 1985	3 June 1986	25	7	12	6	28.00
Varese	(Italy)	7 March 1987	9 June 1987	11	2	3	6	18.18
Pescara	(Italy)	25 September 1989	4 June 1990	35	13	10	12	37.14
Cosenza	(Italy)	1 November 1990	16 June 1992	71	24	28	19	33.80
Verona	(Italy)	16 June 1992	14 June 1993	43	12	16	15	27.91
Bologna	(Italy)	29 November 1993	18 June 1994	25	14	3	8	56.00
Lecce	(Italy)	16 November 1994	30 January 1995	9	2	2	5	22.22
Brescia	(Italy)	26 February 1996	30 June 1997	53	23	16	14	43.40
Torino	(Italy)	7 October 1997	30 June 1998	33	15	11	7	45.45
Vicenza	(Italy)	3 February 1999	22 June 2001	95	37	20	38	38.95
Genoa	(Italy)	29 December 2001	4 March 2002	8	0	4	4	0.00
Catania	(Italy)	29 January 2003	6 April 2003	9	2	3	4	22.22
Cagliari	(Italy)	24 November 2003	30 June 2004	30	17	9	4	56.67
Napoli	(Italy)	16 January 2005	10 March 2009	189	92	52	45	48.68
Hajduk Split	(Croatia)	18 August 2009	9 February 2010	17	11	3	3	64.71
Lazio	(Italy)	10 February 2010	2 June 2012	106	52	20	34	49.06
Lazio	(Italy)	4 January 2014	12 June 2014	25	11	7	7	44.00
Atalanta	(Italy)	4 March 2015	14 June 2016	53	14	20	19	26.42
Albania	(Albania)	17 April 2019	31 December 2022	38	14	9	15	36.84
Gorica	(Slovenia)	2 March 2023	17 April 2023	7	2	1	4	28.57
Total				1,010	391	292	327	38.71

== Honours ==
=== Player ===
SPAL

- Campionato Nazionale Primavera: 1964–65

Alessandria Calcio 1912

- Serie C1: 1973–74

=== Manager ===
Brescia

- Serie B: 1996–97

Vicenza

- Serie B: 1999–2000

Napoli

- Serie C1: 2005–06

== See also ==
- List of football managers with the most matches
