= Lloyd Barker =

Lloyd Barker may refer to:

- Lloyd Barker (criminal, 1897–1949), son of notorious criminal Ma Barker
- Lloyd Barker (umpire) (born 1943), Barbadian cricket umpire
- Lloyd Barker (footballer) (born 1970), Jamaican footballer
