= Thomas Fig =

Danish footballer

Personal information
- Full name: Thomas Fig
- Date of birth: 30 March 1977 (age 49)
- Place of birth: Vejle, Denmark
- Position: Defender

Senior career*
Years	Team	Apps	(Gls)
1996–1997	Vejle BK	2	(0)
1997–2003	Padova	28	(3)
2003–2005	Bassano Virtus	29	(5)
2005–2006	Padova	7	(0)
2006–2007	Piovese	0	(0)
2007–2009	Monselice	0	(0)
2009–2011	Sottomarina Lido	0	(0)
2011–2013	Adriese	0	(0)

International career
1998	Denmark U21	6	(1)
- * Club domestic league appearances and goals

Thomas Fig (born 30 March 1977) is a Danish former professional footballer who played as a defender.

== Career ==
Fig made his debut for Danish club Vejle in the Danish top division if the 1996–97 season with two appearances. He then moved to Padova in the Serie B. In that season, he had 28 appearances and three goals making his debut in the match against Chievo (0–1) on 18 May 1997. In the 1998–99 they suffered relegation to the Serie C1. This season he also suffered a serious ankle injury that would affect the rest of his career. From 1998 to 2006 he jumped between Serie C1 and Serie C2. From 2003 to 2005 he played for Bassano with 29 appearances and 5 goals, before returning to Padova. In the 2006–07 he dropped further down in the divisions into the Serie D with Piovese. In the following year he falls further by joining Monselice. He retired in 2013.

== Honours ==
Padova

- Serie C2: 2000–01

Bassano Virtus

- Serie D: 2004–05
