= Bryce Alderson =

Canadian soccer player (born 1994)

Personal information
- Full name: Bryce Alderson
- Date of birth: February 5, 1994 (age 32)
- Place of birth: Kitchener, Ontario, Canada
- Height: 5 ft 10 in (1.78 m)
- Position: Midfielder

Youth career
- 2010: Portugal FC

Senior career*
Years	Team	Apps	(Gls)
2011	Vancouver Whitecaps FC U-23	11	(0)
2012–2014	Vancouver Whitecaps FC	0	(0)
2012	→ Vancouver Whitecaps FC U-23 (loan)	5	(0)
2013	→ Charleston Battery (loan)	15	(0)
2015–2016	Fortuna Düsseldorf II	15	(0)

International career^{‡}
2010–2011	Canada U17	13	(0)
2012–	Canada U23	1	(0)
- * Club domestic league appearances and goals as of April 16, 2016 ‡ National team caps and goals as of March 22, 2012

Bryce Alderson (born February 5, 1994) is a Canadian former soccer player.

== Club career ==
Alderson began his career with Toronto-based club Portugal FC in the Canadian Soccer League Reserve Division. In 2011, he joined Vancouver Whitecaps FC U-23. He impressed the under-23 side and appeared in two matches with Whitecaps FC in the 2011 MLS Reserve Division. On November 17, 2011 it was announced that Alderson would be joining the club's senior side for the 2012 season. He made his debut in a 2–1 win against the University of Victoria Vikes, coming on as a substitute in the Whitecaps third pre-season match of the season. Alderson was released from his contract with Vancouver on November 14, 2014.

In May 2015, Alderson joined Fortuna Düsseldorf II of the Regionalliga West.

Alderson announced his retirement from professional soccer in 2017 following several ankle injuries.

== International career ==
Alderson captained the Canadian Under 17 team at the 2011 CONCACAF U-17 Championship as well as the 2011 FIFA U-17 World Cup. On December 12, 2011 Alderson was awarded the 2011 Canadian U-17 Player of the Year, this is the second consecutive year in which he has won the award receiving 39.6% of the vote. Alderson was called up to the Canadian U-20 camp on December 2, 2011 for the first formal camp in preparation for qualification in 2013. Alderson also joined the Canadian U-23 team for Olympic Qualifying in March 2012 starting his first match against El Salvador.

== Honours ==
=== Individual ===
- Canadian U-17 Player of the Year: 2010, 2011
