= Ståle Søbye =

Norwegian footballer (born 1971)

Sui Søbye
Personal information
- Full name: Ståle Søbye
- Date of birth: 30 June 1971 (age 55)
- Place of birth: Norway
- Position: Midfielder

College career
Years	Team	Apps	(Gls)
1991–1994	University of San Francisco		

Senior career*
Years	Team	Apps	(Gls)
–1989	IL Driv		
1990	Moss FK	8	(0)
1995	Atlanta Ruckus	29	(8)
1996–1997	Moss FK	30	(4)
1999	San Francisco Bay Seals		
- * Club domestic league appearances and goals

Ståle "Sui" Søbye (born 30 June 1971) is a retired Norwegian football midfielder who was a two time first team All American. He spent one season in the American Professional Soccer League and one in the USL A-League.

Søbye played for Moss FK in the Norwegian Premier League in 1990, having joined the club from IL Driv. He then attended the University of San Francisco where he played on the men's soccer team from 1991 to 1994. He led the team as its creative midfielder, earning 1993 and 1994 first team All American honors. In February 2008, the University of San Francisco inducted Søbye into the school's Athletic Hall of Fame. In 1995, he signed with the Atlanta Ruckus of the A-League. That season, Søbye and striker Lenin Steenkamp took the Ruckus the championship series where it fell to the Seattle Sounders. He returned to Moss FK in Norway for the 1996 season, played the 1997 season in the Norwegian First Division (second tier) before returning to the US in 1999 with the USL A-League San Francisco Bay Seals.
