= Enzo Concina =

Canadian retired soccer player (born 1962)

Personal information
- Date of birth: 21 June 1962 (age 64)
- Place of birth: Prato Carnico, Italy
- Height: 1.86 m (6 ft 1 in)
- Position: Central defender

Senior career*
| Years | Team | Apps | (Gls) |
| 1982 | Toronto Italia | | |
| 1982–1984 | Ravenna | 49 | (0) |
| 1984–1985 | Cesena | 0 | (0) |
| 1985–1986 | Pavia | 55 | (1) |
| 1986–1989 | Piacenza | 68 | (6) |
| 1989–1990 | Monza | 26 | (1) |
| 1991–1992 | S.S. Nola | 47 | (3) |
| 1993–1994 | Forlì | 4 | (0) |
| 1994 | Montreal Impact | 10 | (1) |

International career^{‡}
| 1988–1993 | Canada | 4 | (1) |
- * Club domestic league appearances and goals as of 7 April 2010 ‡ National team caps and goals as of 25 October 2009

Enzo Concina (born 21 June 1962) is a Canadian retired soccer player who played as a defender. Born in Italy, his family moved to Mississauga, Ontario when he was four years old.

== Club career ==
Concina played in the National Soccer League in 1982 with Toronto Italia. He played Professional club football in Italy for Ravenna, Cesena, Pavia, Piacenza, Monza, Nola, Forli, and in Canada for the Montreal Impact. He worked for SSC Napoli as technical assistant to Walter Mazzarri. He worked as assistant coach for D.C. United in 2014. and in the same role for the Montreal Impact in January 2015.

== International career ==
Concina made his debut for Canada in a July 1988 friendly match against Poland and immediately scored his first goal for Canada. He earned a total of 4 caps with the Senior team, scoring 1 goal. He has not represented Canada in any FIFA World Cup qualification matches but did play at the 1993 CONCACAF Gold Cup, his final international coming at that tournament, a 0-8 demolition by Mexico.

== Honours ==
=== Club ===
Montreal Impact

- American Professional Soccer League Champion: 1994.
