= Olivier Lacoste-Lebuis =

Canadian soccer player (born 1990)

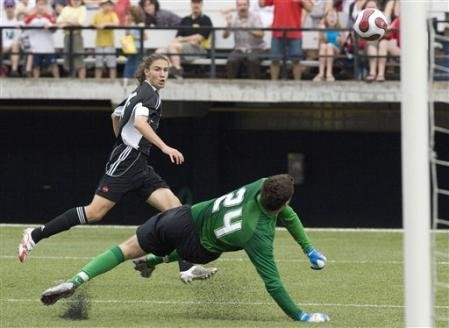
- Lacoste-Lebuis with the Canada U20 in 2007

Personal information
- Full name: Olivier Lacoste-Lebuis
- Date of birth: August 28, 1990 (age 36)
- Place of birth: Mount Royal, Quebec, Canada
- Height: 1.93 m (6 ft 4 in)
- Position: Defensive midfielder

Youth career
- 2001: CS Mont-Royal Outremont
- 2002: Strasbourg
- 2002–2006: Lakers du Lac Saint-Louis
- 2006–2008: Strasbourg

College career
Years	Team	Apps	(Gls)
2009	Maryland Terrapins		
2012	McGill Redmen		

Senior career*
Years	Team	Apps	(Gls)
2006–2008	Strasbourg	1	(0)
Total		1	(0)

International career
2005	Canada U15	8	(0)
2006–2007	Canada U17	10	(1)
2007	Canada U20	7	(0)
- * Club domestic league appearances and goals

Olivier Lacoste-Lebuis (born August 28, 1990) is a Canadian former professional soccer player who played as a defensive midfielder.

== Club career ==
Lacoste-Lebuis was born in Mount Royal, Quebec.

His performances for the Canada under-17 team at a tournament in Northern Ireland in 2006 attracted the interest of clubs from Germany and France. Following a trial he signed a two-year contract with RC Strasbourg in 2006.

He was named Canadian U-17 Player of the Year for 2007.

He made his single professional appearance for Strasbourg on 29 September 2008 against Clermont Foot in Ligue 2, playing the full match.

In January 2009, he joined the Maryland Terrapins of the NCAA.

== International career ==
Lacoste-Lebuis represented Canada at the 2007 CONCACAF Under-17 Qualification Tournament in Kingston, Jamaica, Canada finished fourth in Group B.

In 2006, he captained the Canada under-17 team and was named the top player at the Ballymena Tournament in Northern Ireland.

He was also a member of the Canada U20 side. He was in the squad for the 2007 U-20 World Cup but did not make an appearance.

== Personal life ==
The Montreal native speaks French and English.

== Honours ==
- 2007: Canadian U-17 Player of the Year
