= Henrik Fig =

Danish footballer (born 1972)

Personal information
- Full name: Henrik Cassøe Fig
- Date of birth: March 7, 1972 (age 54)
- Place of birth: Denmark
- Height: 6 ft 0 in (1.83 m)
- Position: Midfielder

Youth career
- Vejle Boldklub

Senior career*
| Years | Team | Apps | (Gls) |
| 1991–1995 | Vejle Boldklub | | |
| 1995–1996 | Colorado Foxes | | |
| 1996–2002 | Vejle Boldklub | | |
| 2002–2005 | Flensberg 08 | | |

Managerial career
- Middelfart G&BK (assistant)
- * Club domestic league appearances and goals

Henrik Fig is a Danish retired association football midfielder who played professionally in Denmark, Germany and the United States.

Fig began his career with Vejle Boldklub, playing on the club's first team from 1991 to 1995. In the spring of 1995, he moved to the United States to sign with the Colorado Foxes of the American Professional Soccer League. In 1996, he returned to Vejle where he played until 2002. That year, he moved to Flensburg 08, a German lower-division club.

He is an assistant coach with .

He is the brother of the player Thomas Fig.
