= Gustavo Villagra =

Argentine footballer

Personal information
- Full name: Gustavo Rubén Villegra
- Date of birth: February 13, 1970 (age 56)
- Place of birth: Palpalá, Argentina
- Height: 6 ft 1 in (1.85 m)
- Position: Midfielder

Senior career*
| Years | Team | Apps | (Gls) |
| 1991–1994 | Newell's Old Boys | 8 | (0) |
| 1992–1993 | → Atlético Tucumán (loan) | | |
| 1993 | → Coquimbo Unido (loan) | | |
| 1995 | Inter de Tijuana | | |
| 1996 | Montreal Impact | 1 | (0) |
| 1996–1997 | Rochester Rhinos | 36 | (0) |
| 1999 | Staten Island Vipers | 23 | (2) |
| 2000 | Connecticut Wolves | 13 | (0) |
- * Club domestic league appearances and goals

Gustavo Villagra is a retired Argentine association football midfielder who played professionally in Argentina, Chile, the United States and Mexico.

In 1991 and 1992, Villagra played for Newell's Old Boys. In 1995, he was with Inter de Tijuana. In 1996, Villagra moved to the United States and joined the Rochester Rhinos of the A-League In June 1996, the Rhinos traded him to the Montreal Impact in exchange for Lenin Steenkamp. However, he was back with the Rhinos by the time the playoffs began. Villagra remained with Rochester in 1997 but was released on April 23, 1998. In 1999, he played for the Staten Island Vipers. In March 2000, Villagra signed with the Connecticut Wolves, finishing his career with them that season. He coaches youth soccer in the United States
