= Robert Lipp =

American soccer player

Personal information
- Full name: Robert Isidor Lipp
- Date of birth: July 10, 1970 (age 56)
- Place of birth: St. Louis, Missouri, U.S.
- Height: 6 ft 0 in (1.83 m)
- Positions: Forward; defender

Youth career
- 1988: Metro State College
- 1989–1992: Colorado College

Senior career*
Years	Team	Apps	(Gls)
1993–1997	Colorado Foxes		
- Colorado Comets
- * Club domestic league appearances and goals

Robert Lipp is an American retired soccer player who played professionally in the American Professional Soccer League and USISL.

== Youth ==
Lipp was a 1987 NSCAA High School All American soccer player and a 1988 Gatorade Player of the Year at Rocky Mountain High School. Lipp spent the 1988 collegiate season with Metro State College. He transferred to Colorado College where he was a 1992 Third Team All American.

== Professional ==
In April 1993, Lipp turned professional with the Colorado Foxes of the American Professional Soccer League. He played for the Foxes through the 1996 season, but broke his right leg in a June 1996 game with the Seattle Sounders. Lipp was also drafted by the St. Louis Ambush in the 1993 National Professional Soccer League draft. The Ambush traded his rights to the Wichita Wings, but a hamstring injury suffered during the Foxes season led to the Wings not signing Lipp.

He also played for the Colorado Comets of the USISL.
