= David Hoggan (footballer) =

Scottish footballer

Personal information
- Full name: David Matthew Hoggan
- Date of birth: 10 August 1961 (age 65)
- Place of birth: Stenhousemuir, Scotland
- Position: Midfielder

Youth career
- 1968–1979: Tynecastle

Senior career*
Years	Team	Apps	(Gls)
1979–1983	Bolton Wanderers	93	(11)
1983–1986	Pittsburgh Spirit (indoor)	101	(71)
1986–1988	Wichita Wings (indoor)	83	(51)
1988–1990	Tacoma Stars (indoor)	108	(62)
1990–1992	Cleveland Crunch (indoor)	59	(23)
1992–1994	Buffalo Blizzard (indoor)	63	(53)
1994–1998	Seattle Sounders		
1994–1995	Detroit Rockers (indoor)	28	(27)
1995–1996	Wichita Wings (indoor)	6	(2)
Total		541	(300)

Managerial career
- 1992–1993: Buffalo Blizzard (assistant)
- 2001: Seattle Sounders (assistant)
- * Club domestic league appearances and goals

David Matthew Hoggan (born 10 August 1961) is a Scottish retired professional footballer. He spent four seasons in England with Bolton Wanderers before moving to the United States. He then spent nearly thirteen seasons in various indoor leagues, and five seasons with the Seattle Sounders.

== Club career ==
Hoggan grew up in Stenhousemuir near Falkirk as a youth, he attended ladeside Primary School and then went onto Larbert High School where he caught the eye of many with his close skills and speed while playing for the School football team, at 15 years old he played with Tynecastle FC where his talents were quickly spotted south of the border and he was snapped up and signed as a 16 year old professional by Bolton Wanderers. He gained his first-team debut on 16 April 1980. In 1983, the Wanderers dropped to the third division and he left Britain for the United States where he signed with the Pittsburgh Spirit in the Major Indoor Soccer League. In his first year with the Spirit, he scored 35 goals. On 4 February 1986, the Spirit sold Hoggan's contract to the Wichita Wings. On 20 September 1988, Hoggan signed a two-year contract with the Tacoma Stars. In January 1989, Hoggan suffered a season-ending injury when he broke a vertebra in his neck in an auto accident. He returned for the 1989–1990 season. In January 1990, he was selected for the All Star Game. However, he was kicked off the All Star team when the Stars suspended him for thirty days after he refused to play in a 10 February 1990 victory over the Wings. The Stars then unsuccessfully attempted to trade him to the San Diego Sockers before sending him to the Cleveland Crunch in exchange for Pato Margetic on 9 March 1990. Hoggan was a critical part of the Crunch's drive to the 1991 MISL championship series where the team fell to the Sockers. In the fall of 1991, he signed a two-year contract with the Crunch and was named team captain. While the Crunch made the playoffs at the end of the season, they fell in the first round to the Dallas Sidekicks. During the off-season, Hoggan moved to the Buffalo Blizzard of the National Professional Soccer League. On 23 January 1993, the league suspended Hoggan for two games after he and hoffman got into an altercation Cleveland Crunch owner George Hoffman over money owed to Hoggan by the Crunch. In April 1994, the Las Vegas Dustdevils of the Continental Indoor Soccer League, a summer indoor league, drafted Hoggan in the fourth round of the league's first draft, but Hoggan instead returned to outdoor soccer with the expansion Seattle Sounders of the American Professional Soccer League. He was a second-team APSL All Star. In the fall of 1994, Hoggan returned to the Blizzard for the 1994–1995 NPSL season, but was sent to the Detroit Rockers some time during the season. In 1995, Hoggan returned to the Sounders who won the league championship. He then had arthroscopic surgery which put out of action for the beginning of the 1995–1996 NPSL season. The Rockers then sold his rights to the Chicago Power, but Hoggan never played for the Power before the team sent him to the Wichita Wings in March 1996. He retired at the end of the season, but returned to play for the Sounders in August 1996. This year, the Sounders repeated as league champion. Hoggan played two more seasons in Seattle before retiring permanently after the 1998 season.

== National team ==
Hoggan was a school boy international with the Scottish U-21 and U-23 teams.

== Coaching ==
When Hoggan moved to the Buffalo Blizzard in 1992, he served as both an assistant coach as well as player. In 2001, he was an assistant coach with the Sounders. "Hoggy" started a new club called Tynecastle International Football Club based in the Bothell- Everett area of Washington. He is the club Director of Coaching and coaches several teams for the club. Hoggy has also taken Highline Heat 89'Blue to the Washington State Championship, and the 89'Red trainer to match off in the semi-finals with the 89'Blue as well as Dallas Cup.
