= 2011 in Canadian soccer =

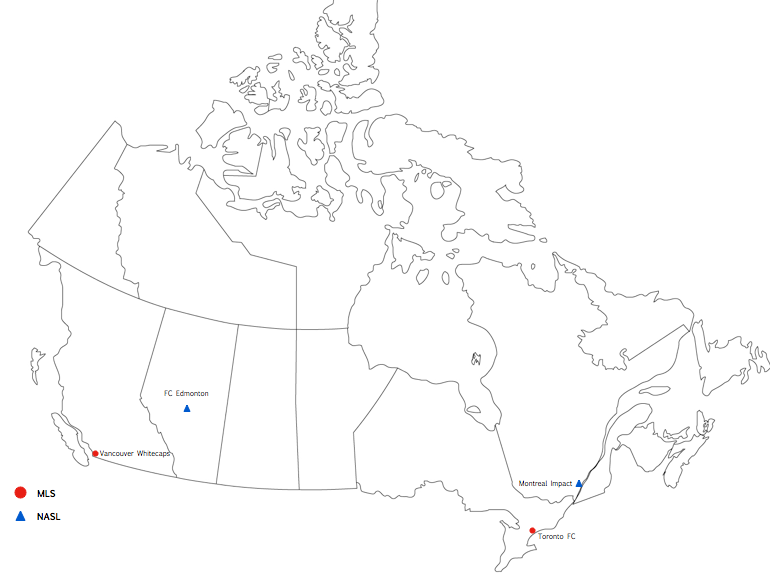
The professional soccer clubs of Canada, year 2011

The 2011 Season is the 99th season of competitive soccer in Canada.

== National teams ==
The home team or the team that is designated as the home team is listed in the left column; the away team is in the right column.

Win Draw Loss

=== Men ===
==== Senior ====
===== Friendly matches =====
| February 9 | Greece | 1–0 | Canada | Larissa, Greece |
| 10:00 UTC−05 | Fetfatzidis 61' | Report | | Stadium: AEL FC Arena; Attendance: 14,800; Referee: (Norway) Svein Oddvar Moe |

| March 29 | Belarus | 0–1 | Canada | Antalya, Turkey |
| 17:00 UTC−05 | | Report | 58' Hainault | Stadium: Antalya Atatürk Stadium; Attendance: 1,400 |

| June 1 | Canada | 2–2 | Ecuador | Toronto |
| 16:30 UTC-4 | | | | Stadium: BMO Field |

===== 2011 CONCACAF Gold Cup =====
| June 7 Group C | United States | 2–0 | Canada | Detroit, United States |
| 18:00 UTC−05 | Altidore 16'; Dempsey 62' | Report | | Stadium: Ford Field; Attendance: 28,209; Referee: Marlon Mejia (El Salvador) |

| June 11 Group C | Canada | 1–0 | Guadeloupe | Tampa, United States |
| 18:00 UTC−05 | De Rosario 51' (pen.) | Report | | Stadium: Raymond James Stadium; Attendance: 27,731; Referee: Trevor Taylor (Barbados) |

| June 14 Group C | Canada | 1–1 | Panama | Kansas City, United States |
| 20:00 UTC−06 | De Rosario 62' (pen.) | Report | 90+1' Tejada | Stadium: Livestrong Sporting Park; Attendance: 20,109; Referee: Walter López (Guatemala) |

==== Under-20 ====
| March 29 Group C | Canada U-20 | 2–1 | Guadeloupe U-20 | Guatemala City, Guatemala |
| 20:00 UTC-5 | Cavallini 52'; Bassi 58' | Report | Houelche 25' | Stadium: Estadio Cementos Progreso; Attendance: 150; Referee: (Honduras) José Molina |

| April 1 Group C | Costa Rica U-20 | 3–0 | Canada U-20 | Guatemala City, Guatemala |
| 20:00 UTC-5 | Golobio 34'; Campbell 66'; Miller 90+1' | Report | | Stadium: Estadio Cementos Progreso, Guatemala City; Attendance: 1,445; Referee: (Jamaica) Raymond Bogle |

| April 5 Quarterfinals | Mexico U-20 | 3–0 | Canada U-20 | Guatemala City, Guatemala |
| 22:00 UTC−05 | Álvarez 33'; De Buen 72'; Mora 90+2' | Report | | Stadium: Estadio Mateo Flores; Attendance: 475; Referee: (United States) Mark Geiger |

==== Under-17 ====
| February 17 Group D | Canada | 8–0 | Barbados U-17 | Montego Bay, Jamaica |
| 12:30 UTC−05 | Petrasso 12', 29', 56'; Jalali 14'; Nanco 23'; Aleman 33', 47'; Cain 73' | Report | | Stadium: Jarrett Park; Attendance: 400; Referee: (Panama) Jafeth Perea |

| February 19 Group D | Honduras U-17 | 0–0 | Canada U-17 | Montego Bay, Jamaica |
| 12:30 UTC−05 | | Report | | Stadium: Catherine Hall Stadium; Attendance: 1,500; Referee: (Jamaica) Valdin Legister |

| February 22 CONCACAF U-17 Champ. QF | United States U-17 | 3–2 (a.e.t.) | El Salvador U-17 | Montego Bay, Jamaica |
| 15:00 UTC−05 | Guido 5'; M. Rodriguez 96'; Pelosi 112' | Report | Peña 9'; Iraheta 120' (pen.) | Stadium: Catherine Hall Stadium; Referee: Valdin Legister (JAM) |

| February 25 CONCACAF U-17 Champ. SF | United States U-17 | 2–0 | Jamaica U-17 | Montego Bay, Jamaica |
| 19:00 UTC−05 | Pelosi 11'; Oliver 90+2' | Report | | Stadium: Catherine Hall Stadium; Attendance: 8,361; Referee: Ricardo Arellano (MEX) |

| February 27 CONCACAF U-17 Champ. F | Canada U-17 | 0–3 (a.e.t.) | United States U-17 | Montego Bay, Jamaica |
| 19:00 UTC−05 | | Report | Smith 92'; Oliver 100'; Koroma 120' | Stadium: Catherine Hall Stadium; Attendance: 2,000; Referee: Enrico Winjgaarde (SUR) |

=== Women ===
==== Senior ====
2011 FIFA Women's World Cup

| June 26 Group A | Germany | 2–1 | Canada | Berlin, Germany |
| 18:00 UTC+01 | Garefrekes 10'; Okoyino da Mbabi 42' | Report | Sinclair 82' | Stadium: Olympic Stadium; Attendance: 73,680; Referee: (Australia) Jacqui Melksham; Assistant referees: (Australia) Allyson Flynn (Australia) Sarah Ho; Fourth official: (Japan) Etsuko Fukano |

| June 30 Group A | Canada | 0–4 | France | Bochum, Germany |
| 18:00 UTC+01 | | Report | Thiney 24', 60'; Abily 66'; Thomis 83' | Stadium: Ruhrstadion; Attendance: 16,591; Referee: (Japan) Etsuko Fukano; Assistant referees: (Japan) Saori Takahashi (China) Zhang Lingling |

| July 6 Group A | Canada | 0–1 | Nigeria | Dresden, Germany |
| 20:45 UTC+01 | | Report | Nkwocha 84' | Stadium: Rudolf-Harbig-Stadion; Attendance: 13,638; Referee: (Fiji) Finau Vulivuli; Assistant referees: (New Zealand) Jacqui Stephenson (Tonga) Lata Tuifutuna; Fourth official: (Greece) Thalia Mitsi |

== Managerial changes ==
| Team | Outgoing | Manner | Date | Table | Incoming | Date | Table |
|---|---|---|---|---|---|---|---|
| Toronto FC | (United States) Preki | Fired | October 27, 2010 | 8th (Western Conference); 15th (Overall) | (Netherlands) Aron Winter | January 4, 2011 | Off-season |
| Vancouver Whitecaps FC | (Iceland) Teitur Thordarson | Fired | May 30, 2011 | | (United States) Tom Soehn | May 30, 2011 | |

== League tables ==
=== Men ===
==== Major League Soccer ====
| Pos | Team | Pld | W | L | T | GF | GA | GD | Pts | |
|---|---|---|---|---|---|---|---|---|---|---|
| 1 | LA Galaxy (S, C) | 34 | 19 | 5 | 10 | 48 | 28 | +20 | 67 | Qualification for the 2012–13 CONCACAF Champions League group stage |
| 2 | Seattle Sounders FC (U) | 34 | 18 | 7 | 9 | 56 | 37 | +19 | 63 | Qualification for the 2012–13 CONCACAF Champions League group stage |
| 3 | Real Salt Lake | 34 | 15 | 11 | 8 | 44 | 36 | +8 | 53 | Qualification for the 2012–13 CONCACAF Champions League group stage |
| 4 | FC Dallas | 34 | 15 | 12 | 7 | 42 | 39 | +3 | 52 | |
| 5 | Sporting Kansas City | 34 | 13 | 9 | 12 | 50 | 40 | +10 | 51 | |
| 6 | Houston Dynamo | 34 | 12 | 9 | 13 | 45 | 41 | +4 | 49 | Qualification for the 2012–13 CONCACAF Champions League group stage |
| 7 | Colorado Rapids | 34 | 12 | 9 | 13 | 44 | 41 | +3 | 49 | |
| 8 | Philadelphia Union | 34 | 11 | 8 | 15 | 44 | 36 | +8 | 48 | |
| 9 | Columbus Crew | 34 | 13 | 13 | 8 | 43 | 44 | −1 | 47 | |
| 10 | New York Red Bulls | 34 | 10 | 8 | 16 | 50 | 44 | +6 | 46 | |
| 11 | Chicago Fire | 34 | 9 | 9 | 16 | 46 | 45 | +1 | 43 | |
| 12 | Portland Timbers | 34 | 11 | 14 | 9 | 40 | 48 | −8 | 42 | |
| 13 | D.C. United | 34 | 9 | 13 | 12 | 49 | 52 | −3 | 39 | |
| 14 | San Jose Earthquakes | 34 | 8 | 12 | 14 | 40 | 45 | −5 | 38 | |
| 15 | Chivas USA | 34 | 8 | 14 | 12 | 41 | 43 | −2 | 36 | |
| 16 | Toronto FC (V) | 34 | 6 | 13 | 15 | 36 | 59 | −23 | 33 | Qualification for the 2011–12 CONCACAF Champions League preliminary round |
| 17 | New England Revolution | 34 | 5 | 16 | 13 | 38 | 58 | −20 | 28 | |
| 18 | Vancouver Whitecaps FC | 34 | 6 | 18 | 10 | 35 | 55 | −20 | 28 | |

Source: MLS
Rules for classification: 1) points; 2) head-to-head record; 3) goal difference; 4) number of goals scored
(C) MLS Cup champions; (S) Supporters' Shield winners; (U) U.S. Open Cup winners; (V) Canadian Championship winners

==== North American Soccer League ====
| Pos | Team | Pld | W | D | L | GF | GA | GD | Pts | Qualification |
|---|---|---|---|---|---|---|---|---|---|---|
| 1 | Carolina RailHawks (X) | 28 | 17 | 3 | 8 | 50 | 26 | +24 | 54 | Playoff semifinals |
| 2 | Puerto Rico Islanders | 28 | 15 | 7 | 6 | 41 | 32 | +9 | 52 | Playoff semifinals |
| 3 | Tampa Bay Rowdies | 28 | 11 | 8 | 9 | 41 | 36 | +5 | 41 | Playoff quarterfinals |
| 4 | Fort Lauderdale Strikers | 28 | 9 | 11 | 8 | 35 | 36 | −1 | 38 | Playoff quarterfinals |
| 5 | FC Edmonton | 28 | 10 | 6 | 12 | 35 | 40 | −5 | 36 (Note: EDM: 8 pts; MIN: 2 pts) | Playoff quarterfinals |
| 6 | NSC Minnesota Stars (C) | 28 | 9 | 9 | 10 | 30 | 32 | −2 | 36 | Playoff quarterfinals |
| 7 | Montreal Impact | 28 | 9 | 8 | 11 | 35 | 27 | +8 | 35 | |
| 8 | Atlanta Silverbacks | 28 | 4 | 4 | 20 | 25 | 63 | −38 | 16 | |

Source: NASL Standings
Rules for classification: 1) points; 2) head-to-head record; 3) goal difference; 4) number of goals scored.
(C) Champions; (X) Regular season champion

==== Canadian Soccer League ====
| Pos | Team | Pld | W | D | L | GF | GA | GD | Pts | Qualification |
|---|---|---|---|---|---|---|---|---|---|---|
| 1 | SC Toronto (A, C) | 26 | 20 | 3 | 3 | 71 | 24 | +47 | 63 | Qualified for the Givova Cup play-offs |
| 2 | Toronto Croatia (A, O) | 26 | 18 | 5 | 3 | 62 | 21 | +41 | 59 | Qualified for the Givova Cup play-offs |
| 3 | Capital City (A) | 26 | 15 | 7 | 4 | 52 | 22 | +30 | 52 | Qualified for the Givova Cup play-offs |
| 4 | Brampton United (A) | 26 | 15 | 3 | 8 | 61 | 43 | +18 | 48 | Qualified for the Givova Cup play-offs |
| 5 | Serbian White Eagles (A) | 26 | 13 | 7 | 6 | 41 | 26 | +15 | 46 | Qualified for the Givova Cup play-offs |
| 6 | Montreal Impact Academy (A) | 26 | 13 | 5 | 8 | 57 | 43 | +14 | 44 | Qualified for the Givova Cup play-offs |
| 7 | Mississauga Eagles (A) | 26 | 13 | 3 | 10 | 44 | 29 | +15 | 42 | Qualified for the Givova Cup play-offs |
| 8 | York Region Shooters (A) | 26 | 12 | 6 | 8 | 40 | 30 | +10 | 42 | Qualified for the Givova Cup play-offs |
| 9 | Brantford Galaxy | 26 | 9 | 3 | 14 | 33 | 53 | −20 | 30 | |
| 10 | TFC Academy | 25 | 8 | 3 | 14 | 43 | 44 | −1 | 27 | |
| 11 | London City | 26 | 6 | 3 | 17 | 28 | 56 | −28 | 21 | |
| 12 | St. Catharines Wolves | 26 | 5 | 4 | 17 | 28 | 77 | −49 | 19 | |
| 13 | Windsor Stars | 26 | 3 | 4 | 19 | 28 | 67 | −39 | 13 | |
| 14 | North York Astros | 25 | 0 | 6 | 19 | 19 | 72 | −53 | 6 | |

Source: []
Rules for classification: 1) points; 2) goal difference; 3) number of goals scored.
(A) Advance to a further round; (C) Champions; (O) Play-off winners

=== Premier Development League ===
With two new franchises (WSA Winnipeg and Hamilton Rage) being added, the Canadian content in this US league has increased to nine teams.

| Team | Province | Division | Result |
|---|---|---|---|
| Ottawa Fury | ON | Northeast | |
| Toronto Lynx | ON | Great Lakes | |
| Forest City London | ON | Great Lakes | |
| Hamilton Rage | ON | Great Lakes | |
| Thunder Bay Chill | ON | Heartland | |
| WSA Winnipeg | MB | Heartland | |
| Abbotsford Mariners | BC | Northwest | |
| Vancouver Whitecaps Residency | BC | Northwest | |
| Victoria Highlanders | BC | Northwest | |

== Canadian clubs in international competitions ==
| Club | Competition | Final round |
|---|---|---|
| Toronto FC | 2010–11 CONCACAF Champions League | Group Stage |
| Winner of the 2011 Canadian Championship | 2011–12 CONCACAF Champions League | Preliminary Round |
