= 2020 in Canadian soccer =

2020 in Canadian soccer
(Canada)

Men's domestic club leagues
Div	League	Champion
I	(Canada) CPL	Forge FC
III	(Canada) L1O	Not held
III	(Canada) PLSQ	A.S. Blainville

Men's international club leagues
Div	League	Champion
I	(United States) (Canada) MLS	Columbus Crew SC
III	(United States) (Canada) USL1	No Canadian participants
IV	(United States) (Canada) USL2	Not held

Women's club leagues
Div	League	Champion
I	(United States) NWSL	Regular season not held
II	(United States) (Canada) UWS	Not held
III	(Canada) L1O	Not held
III	(Canada) PLSQF	A.S. Blainville

Men's domestic cups
Div	Name	Champion
I	Canadian Championship	Toronto FC
IV	Challenge Trophy	Not held

Women's domestic cups
Div	Name	Champion
IV	Jubilee Trophy	Not held

This article is about the 2020 season of competitive soccer in Canada. Due to the COVID-19 pandemic in Canada, several competitions were cancelled or shortened.

== National teams ==
When available, the home team or the team that is designated as the home team is listed in the left column; the away team is in the right column.

Win Draw Loss

=== Senior Men ===
==== Friendlies ====
January 7 Friendly	Canada	4–1	Barbados	Irvine, United States
16:30 PST (UTC−08:00)	Ricketts 7'; Akindele 33'; Osorio 45'; Bair 76'	Report		Stadium: Championship Soccer Stadium; Attendance: 5 Referee: Rubiel Vazquez (United States)

January 10 Friendly	Canada	4–1	Barbados	Irvine, United States
16:30 PST (UTC−08:00)	Brym 10'; Teibert 37'; Đidić 64'; Nelson 86'	Report	Edwards 70'	Stadium: Championship Soccer Stadium; Attendance: 5 Referee: Nima Saghafi (United States)

January 15 Friendly	Canada	0–1	Iceland	Irvine, United States
16:00 PST (UTC−08:00)		Report	Eyjólfsson 21'	Stadium: Championship Soccer Stadium

== Men's domestic club leagues ==
=== Canadian Premier League ===
Eight teams play in this league, all of which are based in Canada. It is considered a Division 1 men's league in the Canadian soccer league system.

Pos	Team	Pld	W	D	L	GF	GA	GD	Pts	Qualification
1	Cavalry	7	4	1	2	10	7	+3	13	Advance to group stage
2	HFX Wanderers	7	3	3	1	12	7	+5	12 (Note: Head-to-head points: HFX Wanderers 1, Forge 1. Goal differential: HFX Wanderers +5, Forge +4)	Advance to group stage
3	Forge	7	3	3	1	13	9	+4	12	Advance to group stage
4	Pacific	7	3	2	2	10	8	+2	11	Advance to group stage
5	York9	7	2	4	1	8	7	+1	10	
6	Valour	7	2	2	3	8	9	−1	8 (Note: Head-to-head points: Valour 3, Atlético Ottawa 0.)	
7	Atlético Ottawa	7	2	2	3	7	12	−5	8	
8	FC Edmonton	7	0	1	6	5	14	−9	1	

Source: CanPL.ca
Rules for classification: 1) points; 2) head-to-head points; 3) goal differential; 4) goals for; 5) total wins; 6) U-21 minutes; 7) coin toss or drawing of lots.

=== League1 Ontario (Men) ===
No League1 Ontario matches were played in 2020.

=== Première Ligue de Soccer du Québec ===
Pos	Team	Pld	W	D	L	GF	GA	GD	Pts	PPG
1	A.S. Blainville (C)	8	6	1	1	21	8	+13	19	2.38
2	Ottawa South United	7	4	2	1	17	9	+8	14	2.00
3	Celtix du Haut-Richelieu	8	4	0	4	10	14	−4	12	1.50
4	CS St-Hubert	8	3	1	4	16	22	−6	10	1.25
5	CS Longueuil	7	2	0	5	8	12	−4	6	0.86
6	CS Fabrose	6	1	0	5	8	15	−7	3	0.50

Source: PLSQ
(C) Champions

=== Canadian Soccer League ===
Pos	Team	Pld	W	D	L	GF	GA	GD	Pts	
1	Scarborough SC (C)	8	5	0	3	18	16	+2	15	Playoffs
2	FC Vorkuta (O)	8	4	3	1	16	8	+8	15	Playoffs
3	Hamilton City	8	4	2	2	19	19	0	14	Ineligible for Playoffs (Note: Hamilton finished the season in a Not-in-Good Standing and were removed from the playoffs)
4	Serbian White Eagles	8	3	1	4	20	16	+4	10	Playoffs
5	Brantford Galaxy	8	1	0	7	9	23	−14	3	

Source: []
Rules for classification: 1) points; 2) total wins; 3) head-to-head points; 4) goal differential; 5) most goals
(C) Champions; (O) Play-off winners

== Men's international club leagues ==
=== Major League Soccer ===
Three Canadian teams (Montreal Impact, Toronto FC, and Vancouver Whitecaps FC) play in this league, which also contains 23 teams from the United States. It is considered a Division 1 men's league in the United States soccer league system.

Overall standings

2020 MLS overall standings
Pos	Team	Pld	W	L	T	GF	GA	GD	Pts	PPG	
1	Philadelphia Union (S)	23	14	4	5	44	20	+24	47	2.04	Qualification for the CONCACAF Champions League (Note: As Supporters' Shield winners (USA2))
2	Toronto FC (V)	23	13	5	5	33	26	+7	44	1.91	Qualification for the CONCACAF Champions League (Note: As 2020 Canadian Championship finalists (awarded by Canada Soccer) (CAN1))
3	Sporting Kansas City	21	12	6	3	38	25	+13	39	1.86	Qualification for the Leagues Cup (Note: As first place in Western Conference (MLS1))
4	Columbus Crew SC (C)	23	12	6	5	36	21	+15	41	1.78	Qualification for the CONCACAF Champions League (Note: As MLS Cup 2020 champions (USA1))
5	Orlando City SC	23	11	4	8	40	25	+15	41	1.78	Qualification for the Leagues Cup (Note: As fourth place in Eastern Conference (MLS2))
6	Seattle Sounders FC	22	11	5	6	44	23	+21	39	1.77	Qualification for the Leagues Cup (Note: As second place in Western Conference (MLS3))
7	New York City FC	23	12	8	3	37	25	+12	39	1.70	Qualification for the Leagues Cup (Note: As fifth place in Eastern Conference (MLS4))
8	Portland Timbers (M)	23	11	6	6	46	35	+11	39	1.70	Qualification for the CONCACAF Champions League (Note: As MLS is Back Tournament winners (USA3))
9	Minnesota United FC	21	9	5	7	36	26	+10	34	1.62	
10	Colorado Rapids	18	8	6	4	32	28	+4	28	1.56	
11	FC Dallas	22	9	6	7	28	24	+4	34	1.55	
12	Los Angeles FC	22	9	8	5	47	39	+8	32	1.45	
13	New York Red Bulls	23	9	9	5	29	31	−2	32	1.39	
14	Nashville SC	23	8	7	8	24	22	+2	32	1.39	
15	New England Revolution	23	8	7	8	26	25	+1	32	1.39	
16	San Jose Earthquakes	23	8	9	6	35	51	−16	30	1.30	
17	Vancouver Whitecaps FC	23	9	14	0	27	44	−17	27	1.17	
18	Montreal Impact	23	8	13	2	33	43	−10	26	1.13	
19	Inter Miami CF	23	7	13	3	25	35	−10	24	1.04	
20	LA Galaxy	22	6	12	4	27	46	−19	22	1.00	
21	Real Salt Lake	22	5	10	7	25	35	−10	22	1.00	
22	Chicago Fire FC	23	5	10	8	33	39	−6	23	1.00	
23	Atlanta United FC (U)	23	6	13	4	23	30	−7	22	0.96	Qualification for the CONCACAF Champions League (Note: As 2019 U.S. Open Cup winners (USA4))
24	D.C. United	23	5	12	6	25	41	−16	21	0.91	
25	Houston Dynamo	23	4	10	9	30	40	−10	21	0.91	
26	FC Cincinnati	23	4	15	4	12	36	−24	16	0.70	

Source: MLS
Rules for classification: 1) points per game; 2) total wins per match played; 3) total goal differential per match played; 4) total goals scored per match played; 5) fewest disciplinary points per match played; 6) away goal differential per away match played; 7) away goals scored per away match played; 8) home goal differential per home match played; 9) home goals scored per home match played; 10) coin toss or drawing of lots.
(C) Champions; (M) MLS is Back Tournament champions; (S) Supporters' Shield winners; (U) U.S. Open Cup winners; (V) Canadian Championship finalists

=== USL League One ===
One Canadian team (Toronto FC II) plays in this league, which also contains nine teams from the United States. It is considered a Division 3 men's league in the United States soccer league system.

Pos	Team	Pld	W	L	D	GF	GA	GD	Pts	PPG	Qualification
1	Greenville Triumph SC	16	11	3	2	24	11	+13	35	2.19	Final, 2021 U.S. Open Cup
2	Union Omaha	16	8	3	5	20	15	+5	29	1.81	Final
3	North Texas SC (Note: Professional teams that are owned by teams playing in a higher division are ineligible for the U.S. Open Cup.)	16	7	3	6	27	19	+8	27	1.69	
4	Richmond Kickers	16	8	6	2	22	22	0	26	1.63	
5	Chattanooga Red Wolves SC	15	6	5	4	21	17	+4	22	1.47	
6	FC Tucson	16	6	6	4	21	19	+2	22	1.38	
7	Forward Madison FC	16	5	5	6	20	14	+6	21	1.31	
8	Tormenta FC	16	5	7	4	19	22	−3	19	1.19	
9	New England Revolution II	16	5	8	3	19	26	−7	18	1.13	
10	Fort Lauderdale CF	16	4	9	3	19	28	−9	15	0.94	
11	Orlando City B	15	1	11	3	10	29	−19	6	0.40	

Source: 2020 USL League One standings
Rules for classification: 1) points; 2) total wins; 3) total goal differential; 4) total goals scored; 5) points earned against top four Conference finishers; 6) disciplinary points; 7) coin toss or drawing of lots

=== USL League Two ===
Not played.

== Women's club leagues ==
=== National Women's Soccer League ===
No Canadian teams play in this league, though players from the Canada women's national soccer team are allocated to its teams by the Canadian Soccer Association. It is considered a Division 1 women's league in the United States soccer league system.

=== United Women's Soccer ===
Not played.

=== League1 Ontario (Women) ===
Not played.

=== Première Ligue de soccer du Québec (Women) ===
Four teams played in this league (after four other withdrew), all of which are based in Canada. It is considered a Division 3 women's league in the Canadian soccer league system.

Team	City	2020 Status
A.S. Blainville	Blainville, Laurentides	Participating
CS Fabrose	Laval, Laval	Participating
CS Longueuil	Longueuil, Montérégie	Participating
CS Monteuil	Laval, Laval	Withdrew
CS Mont-Royal Outremont	Mount Royal, Montréal	Withdrew
Ottawa South United	Ottawa, Ontario	Participating
AS Pierrefonds	Lac St-Louis, Montreal	Withdrew
CS St-Hubert	Saint-Hubert, Montérégie	Withdrew

=== Standings ===
Pos	Team	Pld	W	D	L	GF	GA	GD	Pts	
1	A.S. Blainville (C)	3	3	0	0	11	0	+11	9	Championship Match
2	CS Fabrose	3	2	0	1	5	8	−3	6	Championship Match
3	CS Longueuil	3	1	0	2	5	5	0	3	3rd Place Match
4	Ottawa South United	3	0	0	3	1	9	−8	0	3rd Place Match

Source: PLSQ
(C) Champion

Championship Match

August 15, 2020	A.S. Blainville	0–0 (4–2 p)	CS Fabrose	Laval, Quebec
2:00 p.m.				Stadium: Desjardins Stadium; Referee: Marie-Han Gagnon-Chretien

Third Place Match

August 15, 2020	CS Longueuil	4–0	Ottawa South United	Laval, Quebec
11:30 a.m.	T.Ibarz 18'; K.Lemire 56'; C.Sedki 75'; C.Achille 81'	Report		Stadium: Desjardins Stadium; Referee: Sheila Couture

== Domestic cups ==
The Challenge Trophy and Jubilee Trophy were not contested in 2020.

=== Canadian Championship ===
The Canadian Championship is a national cup contested by men's teams in divisions 1 through 3. In 2020, the championship consisted of a single match between a Canadian Premier League team and a Major League Soccer team.

June 4, 2022
7:00 pm EDT

Forge FC	1–1	Toronto FC
Borges 60'	Report	Pozuelo 57'
Penalties
Achinioti-Jönsson (penalty scored); Campbell (penalty scored); Pacius (penalty scored); Bekker (penalty missed); Choinière (penalty scored); Poku (penalty missed)	4–5	(penalty scored) Jiménez; (penalty scored) Salcedo; (penalty missed) Kerr; (penalty scored) Pozuelo; (penalty scored) Perruzza; (penalty scored) Thompson

Tim Hortons Field, Hamilton, Ontario
Attendance: 13,715
Referee: Silviu Petrescu
