= ASD Nuovo Monselice Calcio =

Italian football club

Nuovo Monselice Calcio
- Full name: A.S.D. Nuovo Monselice Calcio
- Nickname(s): Monselice
- Founded: 1926; 2014 (refounded)
- Ground: Stadio Communale
- Capacity: 1000
- League: Promozione
Home colours	Away colours

A.S.D. Nuovo Monselice Calcio (formerly Monselice Calcio 1926) is an Italian association football club in Monselice in the Province of Padua. They have played in Serie C2 and Serie D, but now play in the Promozione.
