= Anthony McCreath =

Jamaican footballer (born 1970)

Personal information
- Date of birth: 24 July 1970 (age 56)
- Place of birth: Jamaica
- Position: Midfielder

Senior career*
Years	Team	Apps	(Gls)
1994–1997	Colorado Foxes		
1998–1999	Hampton Roads Mariners	37	(7)
2000	Long Island Rough Riders	4	(1)

International career
1996	Jamaica	5	(0)
- * Club domestic league appearances and goals

Anthony McCreath (born 24 July 1970) is a retired Jamaican association football midfielder who played professionally in the United States and earned five caps with the Jamaica national football team.

== Club ==
In 1994, McCreath signed with the Colorado Foxes of the American Professional Soccer League. He was a 1996 First Team All League midfielder with the Foxes. In 1998, McCreath moved to the Hampton Roads Mariners of the USISL A-League. After two seasons with the Mariners, he played four games for the Long Island Rough Riders in 2000.

== International ==
In 1996, McCreath earned five caps with the Jamaica national football team, all in World Cup qualifiers.
