= Lenin Steenkamp =

South African soccer player

Personal information
- Date of birth: 9 September 1969 (age 57)
- Place of birth: Durban, South Africa
- Position: Midfielder

Youth career
- 1989–1992: College of Boca Raton

Senior career*
Years	Team	Apps	(Gls)
1992	Boca Raton Sabres		
1993	Club Boca Raton		
1994	Fort Lauderdale Strikers	1	(0)
1994	→ Carolina Vipers (loan)	3	(1)
1995–1996	Atlanta Ruckus	29	(10)
1995–1996	Tampa Bay Terror (indoor)	36	(25)
1996–2005	Rochester Rhinos	219	(35)
1997	Buffalo Blizzard (indoor)	13	(2)

Managerial career
- 2003–????: Rochester Rhinos (assistant)
- * Club domestic league appearances and goals

Lenin Steenkamp (born 9 September 1969) is a South African football coach and player who spent his entire career in the United States.

== College ==
In 1989, Steenkamp entered the College of Boca Raton on a soccer scholarship. Steenkamp was a 1989, 1991 and 1992 First Team NAIA All American soccer player. In 1989 and 1990, Boca Raton finished runner-up in the NAIA national men's soccer championship. In 1991, the school changed its name to Lynn University and the soccer team won the NAIA national championship. Steenkamp scored both goals in the final and was the tournament MVP. Steenkamp graduated in 1993 and is a member of the Lynn University Athletic Hall of Fame.

== Club ==
During the 1992 college off-season, Steenkamp played for the Boca Raton Sabres of the USISL. In 1993, Steenkamp played for the amateur Club Boca Rotan. This brought him to the attention of the Fort Lauderdale Strikers who signed him for the 1994 American Professional Soccer League season. He missed the first nine games of the season because of visa problems. Then, in July and August 1994, the Strikers sent him on loan to the Carolina Vipers of the Continental Indoor Soccer League. In 1995, he moved to the Atlanta Ruckus. In October 1995, Steenkamp signed with the Tampa Bay Terror of the National Professional Soccer League. He was named to the 1995–1996 All Rookie Team. Steenkamp began the 1996 A-League season with the Ruckus, but was traded to the Montreal Impact in June 1996 despite leading the team with nine goals. The Impact then sent him to the Rochester Rhinos one day later in exchange for Gustavo Romanello and Gustavo Villagra. Steenkamp remained with the Rhinos until his retirement. However, he continued to play indoor soccer, signing with the Buffalo Blizzard in January 1997 and played through the end of the season.

In 2003, Steenkamp became an assistant coach with the Rhinos.

== Inaugural Member of Rochester Rhinos Hall of Fame ==
On 28 July 2011, the Rochester Rhinos announced that Steenkamp would be the first member to be inducted to the new Rhinos Hall of Fame in a ceremony that took place at halftime during the 5 August 2011 match at Sahlen's Stadium. Steenkamp is the all-time leader in games (268) and minutes played (21,613) for the Rochester Rhinos.
