= Lloyd Barker (footballer) =

Jamaican footballer (born 1970)

Personal information
- Full name: Lloyd Barker
- Date of birth: 12 December 1970 (age 55)
- Place of birth: Kingston, Jamaica
- Height: 5 ft 9 in (1.75 m)
- Position: Defender

Senior career*
Years	Team	Apps	(Gls)
1988-1990	Ottawa Intrepid	37	(2)
1993–1998	Montreal Impact	112	(34)
1994	Harbour View FC	?	(?)
1996–1998	Edmonton Drillers (indoor)	46	
1997–2000	Montreal Impact (indoor)	25	
1999–2000	Toronto Lynx	46	(1)
1999–2000	Detroit Rockers (indoor)	2	
2001–2004	Montreal Impact	78	(0)

International career
1994	Jamaica		(0)

Managerial career
- 2007: Concordia Stingers
- * Club domestic league appearances and goals as of 3 July 2008

Lloyd Barker (born 12 December 1970) is a former professional soccer player who represented the Jamaica national team.

== Playing career ==
After beginning his pro career in 1988 with the Ottawa Intrepid of the Canadian Soccer League. He then joined the Montreal Impact in 1993 and was part of the team's starting eleven when the Impact beat the Colorado Foxes 1–0 in the playoff final and won the 1994 league championship. He also helped Montreal win the regular-season titles in 1995, 1996, and 1997.

Barker played internationally for Jamaica, including in a 0–3 friendly loss to the United States in Kingston on 22 November 1994.

In 1995 Barker won the Giuseppe Saputo Trophy and was picked on the league's first all-star team in 1995. In 1999 Barker was transferred to Impact rivals the Toronto Lynx where he gave new impetus to his career when he moved from the forward position to that of defender.

He left the Lynx in 2001 to join the Impact again where he helped the team win their second League Championship in 2004 against the Seattle Sounders.

Barker also played in the National Professional Soccer League for the Edmonton Drillers, Montreal Impact and Detroit Rockers.

== Managerial career ==
On 24 July 2007 he was appointed the head coach of the men's Concordia University soccer team.
