= 1997 USISL A-League =

USISL A-League
- Season: 1997
- Champions: Milwaukee Rampage (1st Title)
- Premiers: Montreal Impact (3rd Title)
- Matches: 336
- Goals: 1,000 (2.98 per match)
- Best Player: (United States) Doug Miller, Rochester Raging Rhinos
- Top goalscorer: (United States) Doug Miller, Rochester Raging Rhinos (23 goals)
- Best goalkeeper: (United States) Dusty Hudock, Seattle Sounders

The 1997 USISL A-League was an American Division II league run by the United Systems of Independent Soccer Leagues during the summer of 1997.

== Overview ==
At the end of the 1996 A-League season, the U.S. second division A-League collapsed. Six of the seven teams in the A-League then joined the USISL which had three leagues in 1996, beginning with the third division USISL Select League. With the collapse of the U.S. second division and the transfer of most of its teams to the USISL, the USISL reorganized its divisions to include the new teams. It moved most of the old second division USISL Select League, plus a few new teams, up to a second division level and merged the old A-League teams into this new U.S. second division which was renamed the USISL A-League.

== Regular season ==
=== Northeast Division ===
Pos	Team	Pld	W	SW	SL	L	GF	GA	GD	Pts
1	Montreal Impact	28	20	1	1	6	58	19	+39	61
2	Rochester Raging Rhinos	28	14	0	5	9	56	47	+9	42
3	Long Island Rough Riders	28	13	3	2	10	44	36	+8	42
4	Toronto Lynx	28	12	2	0	14	44	43	+1	38
5	Connecticut Wolves	28	8	4	1	15	31	45	−14	28
6	Worcester Wildfire	28	6	1	2	19	26	61	−35	19

=== Atlantic Division ===
Pos	Team	Pld	W	SW	SL	L	GF	GA	GD	Pts
1	Hershey Wildcats	28	18	1	1	8	56	33	+23	55
2	Carolina Dynamo	28	16	2	2	8	63	33	+30	50
3	Richmond Kickers	28	15	0	2	11	41	35	+6	45
4	Charleston Battery	28	10	2	3	13	39	50	−11	32
5	Raleigh Flyers	28	8	4	3	13	34	52	−18	28
6	Jacksonville Cyclones	29	4	1	1	23	28	73	−45	13

=== Central Division ===
Pos	Team	Pld	W	SW	SL	L	GF	GA	GD	Pts
1	New Orleans Riverboat Gamblers	28	13	3	2	10	45	42	+3	42
2	Nashville Metros	28	10	7	2	9	42	34	+8	37
3	Orlando Sundogs	28	12	0	4	12	39	40	−1	36
4	Milwaukee Rampage	28	11	3	2	12	33	36	−3	36
5	Minnesota Thunder	28	11	2	5	10	22	30	−8	35
6	Atlanta Ruckus	28	9	3	1	15	39	48	−9	30

=== Pacific Division ===
Pos	Team	Pld	W	SW	SL	L	GF	GA	GD	Pts
1	California Jaguars	28	17	1	0	10	48	34	+14	52
2	Seattle Sounders	28	16	2	3	7	42	19	+23	50
3	Vancouver 86ers	28	15	1	1	11	50	29	+21	46
4	Colorado Foxes	28	15	1	2	10	55	49	+6	46
5	Orange County Zodiac	28	10	1	0	17	35	62	−27	31
6	El Paso Patriots	28	5	3	3	17	30	50	−20	18

== Division Semi-finals ==
=== Northeast Semifinal 1 ===
September 3, 1997

Rochester Raging Rhinos (NY)	0–0	Long Island Rough Riders (NY)
Kevin Koetters (yellow card); Fuseini Dauda (yellow card); Andrew McKay (yellow card); Leon Minott (yellow card); Lenin Steenkamp (yellow card); Gustavo Villagra (red card) 78'	Report	(yellow card) ?' (yellow-red card) 78' Tom Lips; (yellow card) Daniel Leon; (yellow card) Flávio Ferri
Penalties
Mali Walton (penalty scored); Mike Kirmse (penalty scored); Nate Daligcon (penalty scored); Andrew McKay (penalty missed); Doug Miller (penalty missed); Fuseini Dauda (penalty missed); Chris Kennell (penalty missed)	3–4	(penalty scored) Daniel Leon; (penalty scored) David Price; (penalty scored) Laurence Piturro; (penalty missed) Hector Wright; (penalty missed) Ernest Inneh; (penalty missed) Jim McElderry; (penalty scored) Sal Leanti

Frontier Field, Rochester, New York
Attendance: 5,160

September 6, 1997

Long Island Rough Riders (NY)	1–1	Rochester Raging Rhinos (NY)
Carlos Ledesma (62:26); Ernest Inneh (red card) 29'; Dahir Mohammed (yellow card) ?' (yellow-red card) 88'; Travis Rinker (yellow card)	Report 1 Report 2	(7:43) Nate Daligcon; (yellow card) ?' (yellow-red card) 82' Leon Minott; (yellow card) Fuseini Dauda; (yellow card) Nate Houser; (yellow card) Jimmy Glenn
Penalties
Travis Rinker (penalty scored); Hector Wright (penalty scored); Daniel Leon (penalty scored)	3–1	(penalty scored) Mali Walton; (penalty missed) Garth Miller; (penalty missed) Nate Houser; (penalty missed) Kevin Koetters

James M. Shuart Stadium, Hempstead, New York
Attendance: 4,361

Long Island advances to the Division final

=== Northeast Semifinal 2 ===
September 5, 1997
8:00 PM (EST)

Toronto Lynx (ON)	1–2	Montreal Impact (QC)
Terry St Louis 13'; Peyvand Mossavat (yellow card) 31'; Martin Dugas (yellow card) 42'; Franco Spadafina (red card) 43'; Paul Stalteri (yellow card) 45'	Report	8' Onandi Lowe; (yellow card) 13' John Limniatis; (red card) 25' Onandi Lowe; 62' Mauro Biello

Varsity Stadium, Toronto
Attendance: 1,254
Referee: Tony Camacho (Canada)

September 7, 1997

Montreal Impact (QC)	4–0	Toronto Lynx (ON)
Tommy Moreland 17' (pen.), 25', 26'; Bill Sedgewick 45'

Complexe sportif Claude-Robillard, Montreal
Attendance: 4,138

Montreal advances to the Division final

=== Atlantic Semifinal 1 ===
September 5, 1997

Richmond Kickers (VA)	1–2	Carolina Dynamo (NC)
Rob Ukrop 63'		23' Robert Rosario; 31' Yari Allnutt

University of Richmond Stadium, Richmond, Virginia
Attendance: 1,362

September 6, 1997

Carolina Dynamo (NC)	1–4	Richmond Kickers (VA)
Keiran Breslin 32'		14' Dian Anguelov; 72' Brian Kamler; 75' Mario Lone; 82' Mac Cozier

Simeon Stadium, High Point, North Carolina
Attendance: 1,560

September 6, 1997

Carolina Dynamo (NC)	0–0	Richmond Kickers (VA)
Penalties
	3–1

Simeon Stadium, High Point, North Carolina
Attendance: 1,560

Carolina advances to the Division final

=== Atlantic Semifinal 2 ===
September 5, 1997
7:30 PM (EST)

Charleston Battery (CA)	1–1	Hershey Wildcats (PA)
Juan Castillo (yellow card) 38'; Michael Anhaeuser (yellow card) 50'; Patrick Olalere 85'	Report	78' Mark Waite
Penalties
	1–3

Stoney Field, Charleston, South Carolina
Attendance: 2,024
Referee: Roger Sill

September 7, 1997
6:00 PM (EST)

Hershey Wildcats (PA)	1–1	Charleston Battery (CA)
Lee Tschantret 89'	Report	(yellow card) Juan Castillo; 75' Patrick Olalere
Penalties
	0–1

Hersheypark Stadium, Hershey, Pennsylvania
Attendance: 2,104
Referee: Yanich Wejlak

September 7, 1997
8:55 PM (EST)

Hershey Wildcats (PA)	0–0	Charleston Battery (CA)
	Report
Penalties
	4–2

Hersheypark Stadium, Hershey, Pennsylvania
Attendance: 2,104
Referee: Yanich Wejlak

Hershey advances to the Division final

=== Central Semifinal 1 ===
September 4, 1997
7:45 PM (EST)

Orlando Sundogs (FL)	1–2	New Orleans Riverboat Gamblers (LA)
Dylan Lewis (yellow card) ?' (yellow-red card) 34'; Greg Brick 54'	Report	12', 23' Stern John

Citrus Bowl, Orlando, Florida
Referee: Robert Mann (USA)

September 7, 1997
6:00 PM (EST)

New Orleans Riverboat Gamblers (LA)	6–2	Orlando Sundogs (FL)
Gabe Gentile 2'; Stern John 10', 89'; Louie Smothermon 23'; Mickey Trotman 39'	Report	29' Sebastian Barnes; 67' Sheldon Lee

Tad Gormley Stadium, New Orleans
Attendance: 653

New Orleans advances to the Division final

=== Central Semifinal 2 ===
September 4, 1997

Nashville Metros (TN)	1–2	Milwaukee Rampage (WI)
Tim Geltz 2'		81' Nick Igel; 85' David Marshall

Columbia Stadium, Nashville, Tennessee
Attendance: 550 or 1,500

September 7, 1997

Milwaukee Rampage (WI)	3–0	Nashville Metros (TN)
Travis Roy 27'; Dan Stebbins 81', 83'

Uihlein Soccer Park, Milwaukee, Wisconsin
Attendance: 1,229

Milwaukee advances to the Division final

=== Pacific Semifinal 1 ===
September 4, 1997

Colorado Foxes (CO)	0–3	Seattle Sounders (WA)
Rivers Guthrie (yellow card)	Report	(yellow card) Vicente Figueroa; 20' Erik Storkson; 26' Mike Gailey; 84' (pen.) David Hoggan

Mile High Greyhound Park, Commerce City, Colorado
Attendance: 786
Referee: Rudy Bettmann (USA)

September 6, 1997

Seattle Sounders (WA)	2–0	Colorado Foxes (CO)
Henry Gutierrez (yellow card); Vicente Figueroa (yellow card); Vicente Figueroa 70'; Esmundo Rodriguez 89'	Report	(yellow card) Chad Ashton; (yellow card) 87' (yellow-red card) 88' Ray Tomlin

Memorial Stadium, Seattle
Attendance: 6,927
Referee: Mohammad Zarrabi-Kashani (USA)

Seattle advances to the Division final

=== Pacific Semifinal 2 ===
September 5, 1997

Vancouver 86ers (BC)	4–1	California Jaguars (CA)
Domenic Mobilio 2' (pen.); 54' (pen.); Steve Kindel 35'		86' Paul Holocher

Swangard Stadium, Burnaby, British Columbia
Attendance: 2,716

September 7, 1997

California Jaguars (CA)	2–2	Vancouver 86ers (BC)
Mark Baena 55'; Rick Iversen 89'		22' Steve Kindel; 73' Domenic Mobilio
Penalties
	1–2

Salinas Sports Complex, Salinas, California
Attendance: 1,859

Vancouver advances to the Division final

== Division Finals ==
=== Northeast Division final ===
September 12, 1997

Long Island Rough Riders (NY)	2–1	Montreal Impact (QC)
Hector Wright 4'; Flavio Ferri 55'		5' Lloyd Barker

James M. Shuart Stadium, Hempstead, New York
Attendance: 3,585

September 14, 1997

Montreal Impact (QC)	2–0	Long Island Rough Riders (NY)
Mauro Biello 34'; Lyndon Hooper 77'

Complexe sportif Claude-Robillard, Montreal
Attendance: 6,679

September 14, 1997

Montreal Impact (QC)	0–0	Long Island Rough Riders (NY)
Penalties
	1–4

Complexe sportif Claude-Robillard, Montreal
Attendance: 6,679

=== Atlantic Division final ===
September 12, 1997

Charleston Battery (SC)	3–3	Carolina Dynamo (NC)
Todd Miller 37'; Juan Castillo 52' (pen.); Alvin Boisson 53'		43' Danny Care; 54' John Ball; 81' Mike Saunders
Penalties
	4–3

Stoney Field, Charleston, South Carolina
Attendance: 1,422

September 14, 1997

Carolina Dynamo (NC)	2–1	Charleston Battery (SC)
Maher Atta 29'; Yari Allnutt 89'		27' (pen.) Andy Schmetzer

A.J. Simeon Stadium, High Point, North Carolina
Attendance: 1,506

September 14, 1997

Carolina Dynamo (NC)	1–0	Charleston Battery (SC)
Ed Radwanski 12'

A.J. Simeon Stadium, High Point, North Carolina
Attendance: 1,506

=== Central Division final ===
September 12, 1997

Milwaukee Rampage (WI)	2–1 (OT)	New Orleans Riverboat Gamblers (LA)
Nick Igel 81', 92'		9' Ricardo Blanchard

Uihlein Soccer Park, Milwaukee, Wisconsin
Attendance: 2,818

September 14, 1997

New Orleans Riverboat Gamblers (LA)	3–4	Milwaukee Rampage (WI)
Stern John 64' (pen.); Gabe Jones 67'; Mickey Trotman 78'		51' (pen.), 78' (pen.) Jon Szczepanski; 60' Dan Stebbins; 74' David Marshall

Tad Gormley Stadium, New Orleans, Louisiana
Attendance: 898

=== Pacific Division final ===
September 12, 1997

Vancouver 86ers (BC)	3–0	Seattle Sounders (WA)
Craig Dalrymple (yellow card); Domenic Mobilio 62'; Nico Berg 70'; Chris Clarke 86'	Report	(yellow card) Henry Gutierrez; (yellow card) Kieran Barton; (yellow card) Vicente Figueroa

Swangard Stadium, Burnaby, British Columbia
Attendance: 3,607
Referee: Rene Perott (Canada)

September 14, 1997

Seattle Sounders (WA)	0–0 (a.e.t.)	Vancouver 86ers (BC)
Neil Megson (yellow card); Henry Gutierrez (yellow card)	Report 1 Report 2	(yellow card) Chris Franks; (yellow card) Richie Sumner
Penalties
Bernie James (penalty scored); David Hoggan (penalty missed); Henry Gutierrez (penalty missed); Esmundo Rodriguez (penalty missed)	1–0	(penalty missed) Domenic Mobilio; (penalty missed) Ollie Heald; (penalty missed) Jason Jordan; (penalty missed) Paul Dailly; (penalty missed) Chris Franks

Memorial Stadium, Seattle, Washington
Attendance: 4,820

September 14, 1997

Seattle Sounders (WA)	1–1 (a.e.t.)	Vancouver 86ers (BC)
Erik Storkson 29'	Report 1 Report 2	7' Domenic Mobilio
Penalties
Bernie James (penalty missed); David Hoggan (penalty missed); Vicente Figueroa (penalty scored); Esmundo Rodriguez (penalty missed)	1–3	(penalty scored) Domenic Mobilio; (penalty scored) Ian Clarke; (penalty scored) Steve Kindel; (penalty missed) Doug Muirhead

Memorial Stadium, Seattle, Washington
Attendance: 4,820

== Conference finals ==
=== Eastern Conference ===
September 19, 1997

Long Island Rough Riders (NY)	1–2	Carolina Dynamo (NC)
Laurence Piturro 71'		72', 89' (pen.) Brian Loftin

Hofstra Stadium, Hempstead, New York
Attendance: 1,044

September 21, 1997
6:00 PM EST

Carolina Dynamo (NC)	2–0	Long Island Rough Riders (NY)
Brian Loftin 84'; Laurence Piturro 86' (o.g.)

A.J. Simeon Stadium, High Point, North Carolina
Attendance: 2,105

The Carolina Dynamo advance.

=== Western Conference ===
September 19, 1997

Milwaukee Rampage (WI)	3–1	Vancouver 86ers (BC)
Dan Stebbins 65', 82', 87'		51' Domenic Mobilio

Uihlein Soccer Park, Milwaukee, Wisconsin
Attendance: 2,888

September 21, 1997
5:00 PM

Vancouver 86ers (BC)	1–0	Milwaukee Rampage (WI)
Domenic Mobilio 63' (pen.)

Swangard Stadium, Burnaby, British Columbia
Attendance: 4,323

September 21, 1997
7:00 PM

Vancouver 86ers (BC)	0–0	Milwaukee Rampage (WI)
	Report
Penalties
Penalty missed	0–3	(penalty scored) Dan Stebbins; (penalty scored) Eddy Berdusco; (penalty scored) Nick Igel

Swangard Stadium, Burnaby, British Columbia
Attendance: 4,323
Referee: Kevin Skinner

The Milwaukee Rampage advance, winning two out of three games.

== Final ==
September 27, 1997
8:30 PM

Milwaukee Rampage (WI)	1–1 (a.e.t.)	Carolina Dynamo (NC)
Dan Stebbins 65'	Report	80' Brian Loftin
Penalties
Jon Szczepanski (penalty scored); Dan Stebbins (penalty scored); Nick Igel (penalty scored)	3–0	(penalty missed) Maher Atta; (penalty missed) Yari Allnutt; (penalty missed) Ed Radwanski

Uihlein Soccer Park, Milwaukee
Attendance: 6,381

MVP: Carmine Isacco, Milwaukee Rampage

== Points leaders ==
Rank	Scorer	Club	Goals	Assists	Points
1	(United States) Doug Miller	Rochester Rhinos	23	5	51
2	(United States) Mark Baena	California Jaguars	20	4	44
3	(Trinidad and Tobago) Stern John	New Orleans Riverboat Gamblers	16	5	37
4	(United States) Steve Patterson	Colorado Foxes	16	3	35
5	(United States) Jamel Mitchell	Nashville Metros	17	0	34
5	(United States) Jimmy Glenn	Rochester Rhinos	13	8	34
7	(United States) Yari Allnutt	Carolina Dynamo	12	9	33
7	(Canada) Domenic Mobilio	Vancouver 86ers	14	5	33
7	(England) Darren Tilley	Montreal Impact	13	7	33
7	(Argentina) Gustavo Leal	Orange County Zodiac	16	1	33
11	(Ghana) Sebastian Barnes	Orlando Sundogs	14	3	31
12	(Canada) Garret Kusch	Vancouver 86ers	10	10	30
13	(United States) Mike Gailey	Seattle Sounders	10	7	27
13	(United States) Rob Ukrop	Richmond Kickers	12	3	27

== Honors ==
- MVP: (United States) Doug Miller
- Leading goal scorer: (United States) Doug Miller
- Leading goalkeeper: (United States) Dusty Hudock
- Rookie of the Year: (Trinidad and Tobago) Stern John
- Coach of the Year: (United States) Bob Lilley
- First Team All League
  - Goalkeeper: (United States) Dusty Hudock
  - Defenders: (Canada) John Limniatis, (United States) Scott Schweitzer, (Canada) Mark Watson, (United States) Travis Rinker
  - Midfielders: (United States) Yari Allnutt, (Canada) Mauro Biello, (Canada) Garret Kusch
  - Forwards: (United States) Mark Baena, (United States) Doug Miller, (Trinidad and Tobago) Stern John
- Second Team All League
  - Goalkeeper: (Canada) Paolo Ceccarelli
  - Defenders: (United States) Don Gramenz, (England) Robert Rosario, (United States) Bill Sedgewick, (Bulgaria) Dian Anguelov
  - Midfielders: (England) John Smith, (Canada) Nick DeSantis, (Canada) Domenic Mobilio
  - Forwards: (United States) Steve Patterson, (England) Darren Tilley, (United States) Mike Gailey
- Organization of the Year: Rochester Raging Rhinos
- Executive of the Year: (United States) Todd Smith, Hershey Wildcats
- Fair Play Award: Colorado Foxes
