= 2000 San Jose Earthquakes season =

San Jose Earthquakes
2000 season
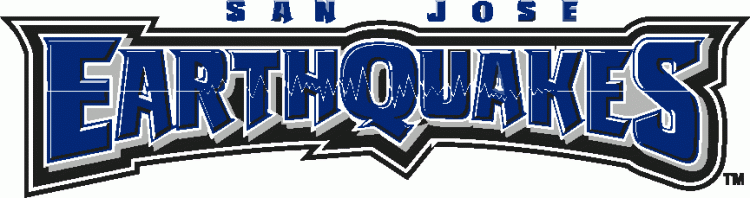
- Owner: Kraft Sports Group
- Coach: Lothar Osiander
- Stadium: Spartan Stadium
- Major League Soccer: Division: 4th Overall: 12th
- MLS Cup: Did not qualify
- U.S. Open Cup: Quarterfinals
- California Clásico: 2nd
- Top goalscorer: Abdul Thompson Conteh (8)
- Average home league attendance: 12,460
Home colors	Away colors

The 2000 San Jose Earthquakes season was the fifth season of the team's existence, and the first year that the MLS team used the "Earthquakes" name. The team finished with the worst record Western conference as well as the league.

== Squad ==
=== Current squad ===
As of August 18, 2009. Note: Flags indicate national team as defined under FIFA eligibility rules; some limited exceptions apply. Players may hold more than one non-FIFA nationality.

No.	Pos.	Nation	Player
0	GK	USA	Jon Conway
1	GK	USA	Joe Cannon
2	DF	USA	Dan Calichman
3	DF	USA	John Doyle
4	DF	USA	Mike Burns
5	FW	USA	Esmundo Rodriguez
5	DF	USA	Gabe Eastman
6	DF	SCO	Jamie Clark
7	MF	USA	Justin Evans
8	DF	USA	Richard Mulrooney
9	MF	USA	Scott Bower
10	MF	TRI	Travis Mulraine
11	FW	IRN	Khodadad Azizi

No.	Pos.	Nation	Player
12	FW	ARM	Harut Karapetyan
13	MF	USA	Ryan Tinsley
15	MF	USA	Ian Russell
16	FW	SLE	Abdul Thompson Conteh
17	DF	USA	Jimmy Conrad
18	MF	USA	Wojtek Krakowiak
19	DF	USA	Ryan Edwards
20	FW	SLV	Ronald Cerritos
21	FW	VEN	Giovanni Savarese
23	DF	USA	Mauricio Solís
24	DF	USA	Wade Barrett
27	MF	USA	Dario Brose
29	DF	CRC	Mauricio Wright

== Club ==
=== Management ===
Position	Staff
General Manager	(United States) Tom Neale
Head Coach	(Canada) Lothar Osiander
Assistant Coach	(Germany) Joe Silviera
Goalkeeper Coach	(New Zealand) Tim Hanely
Head trainer	(United States) Bruce Morgan
Equipment manager	(El Salvador) Jose Vega

Last updated: April 18, 2009
Source: San Jose Earthquakes

=== Other information ===
Owner	(United States) Earthquakes Soccer, LLC
Ground (capacity and dimensions)	Spartan Stadium (26,525 / 71x110 yards)

Source: San Jose Earthquakes

== Competitions ==
=== Major League Soccer ===
==== Matches ====
March 25, 2000	Columbus Crew	2–1 (OT)	San Jose Earthquakes	Columbus, Ohio
	West 85'; Warzycha 100'	Report	Cerritos 92'	Stadium: Columbus Crew Stadium; Attendance: 16,095

April 1, 2000	Miami Fusion	0–0 (OT)	San Jose Earthquakes	Fort Lauderdale, Florida
		Report		Stadium: Lockhart Stadium; Attendance: 6,237

April 8, 2000	San Jose Earthquakes	2–0	MetroStars	San Jose, California
	Doyle 21'; Doyle 31'	Report		Stadium: Spartan Stadium; Attendance: 20,824

April 15, 2000	Kansas City Wizards	2–0	San Jose Earthquakes	Kansas City, Missouri
	Henderson 34'; Molnar 79'	Report		Stadium: Arrowhead Stadium; Attendance: 7,380

April 22, 2000	San Jose Earthquakes	5–0	Dallas Burn	San Jose, California
	Cerritos 10'; Brose 14'; Cerritos 36'; Conteh 40'; Conteh 70'	Report		Stadium: Spartan Stadium; Attendance: 8,871

April 26, 2000	Tampa Bay Mutiny	4–0	San Jose Earthquakes	Tampa, Florida
	Díaz Arce 8'; Lagos 14'; Lagos 58'; Diallo 80'	Report		Stadium: Raymond James Stadium; Attendance: 5,510

April 29, 2000	San Jose Earthquakes	2–2 (OT)	D.C. United	San Jose, California
	Cerritos 20'; Conteh 69'	Report	Etcheverry 33'; Moreno 44'	Stadium: Spartan Stadium; Attendance: 13,717

May 6, 2000	New England Revolution	2–1	San Jose Earthquakes	Foxborough, Massachusetts
	Ramos 55'; Harris 58'	Report	Conteh 72'	Stadium: Foxboro Stadium; Attendance: 14,489

May 13, 2000	Chicago Fire	4–1	San Jose Earthquakes	Chicago
	Kovalenko 5'; Kubík 12' own goal 13'; Razov 40'	Report	Karapetyan 70'	Stadium: Soldier Field; Attendance: 11,467

May 17, 2000	San Jose Earthquakes	0–0 (OT)	Los Angeles Galaxy	San Jose, California
		Report		Stadium: Spartan Stadium; Attendance: 12,692

May 20, 2000	Kansas City Wizards	2–0	San Jose Earthquakes	Kansas City, Missouri
	Vermes 35'; Molnar 90'	Report		Stadium: Arrowhead Stadium; Attendance: 17,272

May 27, 2000	Los Angeles Galaxy	1–1 (OT)	San Jose Earthquakes	Pasadena, California
	Elliott 22'	Report	Solís 32'	Stadium: Rose Bowl; Attendance: 17,831

June 3, 2000	San Jose Earthquakes	4–2	Colorado Rapids	San Jose, California
	Doyle 57'; Conteh 88'; Brose 90'; Azizi 92'	Report	Bravo 13'; Bravo 40'	Stadium: Spartan Stadium; Attendance: 8,129

June 10, 2000	New England Revolution	3–0	San Jose Earthquakes	Foxborough, Massachusetts
	Chronopoulos 28'; Beasley 74'; Beasley 88'	Report		Stadium: Foxboro Stadium; Attendance: 14,109

June 17, 2000	San Jose Earthquakes	3–1	Miami Fusion	San Jose, California
	Conteh 19'; Krakowiak 55'; Conteh 87'	Report	Gutierrez 45'	Stadium: Spartan Stadium; Attendance: 12,063

June 21, 2000	San Jose Earthquakes	2–2 (OT)	New England Revolution	San Jose, California
	Krakowiak 10'; Karapetyan 69'	Report	Harris 79'; Wright 91'	Stadium: Spartan Stadium; Attendance: 10,217

June 24, 2000	San Jose Earthquakes	1–1 (OT)	Chicago Fire	San Jose, California
	Russell 92'	Report	Kovalenko 31'	Stadium: Spartan Stadium; Attendance: 13,596

June 28, 2000	MetroStars	0–0 (OT)	San Jose Earthquakes	East Rutherford, New Jersey
		Report		Stadium: Giants Stadium; Attendance: 10,476

July 1, 2000	Columbus Crew	2–1	San Jose Earthquakes	Columbus, Ohio
	Warzycha 83'; Washington 84'	Report	Krakowiak 48'	Stadium: Columbus Crew Stadium; Attendance: 14,068

July 4, 2000	San Jose Earthquakes	0–0 (OT)	Kansas City Wizards	San Jose, California
		Report		Stadium: Spartan Stadium; Attendance: 14,881

July 8, 2000	Colorado Rapids	0–1	San Jose Earthquakes	Denver, Colorado
		Report	Conteh 34'	Stadium: Mile High Stadium; Attendance: 7,520

July 15, 2000	San Jose Earthquakes	1–2	Colorado Rapids	San Jose, California
	Brose 63'	Report	Agogo 6'; Agogo 89'	Stadium: Spartan Stadium; Attendance: 10,131

July 22, 2000	San Jose Earthquakes	1–2	New England Revolution	San Jose, California
	Krakowiak 46'	Report	Sunsing 16'; Harris 63'	Stadium: Spartan Stadium; Attendance: 7,827

August 2, 2000	San Jose Earthquakes	1–2	Columbus Crew	San Jose, California
	Brose 95'	Report	Lapper 43'; McBride 51'	Stadium: Spartan Stadium; Attendance: 7,643

August 5, 2000	Colorado Rapids	2–0	San Jose Earthquakes	Denver, Colorado
	Bravo 5' own goal 13'	Report		Stadium: Mile High Stadium; Attendance: 14,510

August 12, 2000	San Jose Earthquakes	1–2	Tampa Bay Mutiny	San Jose, California
	Azizi 52'	Report	Diallo 9'; Kotschau 77'	Stadium: Spartan Stadium; Attendance: 9,156

August 16, 2000	San Jose Earthquakes	0–3	Kansas City Wizards	San Jose, California
		Report	Gomez 18'; Figueroa 26'; Henderson 80'	Stadium: Spartan Stadium; Attendance: 7,081

August 19, 2000	D.C. United	0–1	San Jose Earthquakes	Washington, D.C.
		Report	Azizi 53'	Stadium: RFK Stadium; Attendance: 14,138

August 26, 2000	San Jose Earthquakes	0–3	Los Angeles Galaxy	San Jose, California
		Report	Elliott 29'; Elliott 61'; Hernández 75'	Stadium: Spartan Stadium; Attendance: 15,683

August 30, 2000	Los Angeles Galaxy	2–1	San Jose Earthquakes	Pasadena, California
	George 40'; Vorbe 93'	Report	Brose 89'	Stadium: Rose Bowl; Attendance: 11,974

September 1, 2000	San Jose Earthquakes	3–0	Columbus Crew	San Jose, California
	Doyle 2'; Russell 4'; Krakowiak 90'	Report		Stadium: Spartan Stadium; Attendance: 26,853

September 9, 2000	Dallas Burn	2–1	San Jose Earthquakes	Dallas, Texas
	Graziani 44'; Deering 89'	Report	Solís 59'	Stadium: Cotton Bowl; Attendance: 14,833

(OT) = Overtime

=== U.S. Open Cup ===
June 14, 2000 Second Round	Stanislaus United Cruisers	0–5	San Jose Earthquakes	Modesto, California
		Report	Karapetyan 26'; Russell 61' 71'; Conteh 75' 88'	Stadium: Central Catholic High School; Attendance: 3,600 (est.)

July 25, 2000 Third Round	San Jose Earthquakes	2–0	Richmond Kickers	San Jose, California
	Bower 15'; Russell 79'	Report		Stadium: Spartan Stadium; Attendance: 1,021

August 9, 2000 Quarterfinal	Los Angeles Galaxy	2–0	San Jose Earthquakes	Fullerton, California
	Cienfuegos 77'; George 81'	Report		Stadium: Titan Stadium; Attendance: 4,345

==== Standings ====
Western Division	GP	W	L	D	GF	GA	GD	Pts
s – Kansas City Wizards	32	16	7	9	47	29	18	57
x – Los Angeles Galaxy	32	14	10	8	47	37	10	50
x – Colorado Rapids	32	13	15	4	43	59	-16	43
San Jose Earthquakes	32	7	17	8	35	50	-15	29

- Top eight teams with the highest points clinch play-off berth, regardless of division.
  s = Supporters Shield
  x = Clinched Playoff berth.

=== Overall ===
Pos	Club	Pld	W	L	T	GF	GA	GD	Pts	Qualification
1	Kansas City Wizards (SS) (W1)	32	16	7	9	47	29	+18	57	2000 MLS Cup Playoffs, 2002 CONCACAF Champions' Cup
2	Chicago Fire (C1)	32	17	9	6	67	51	+16	57	2000 MLS Cup Playoffs, 2002 CONCACAF Champions' Cup
3	MetroStars (E1)	32	17	12	3	64	56	+8	54	2000 MLS Cup Playoffs
4	Tampa Bay Mutiny	32	16	12	4	62	50	+12	52	2000 MLS Cup Playoffs
5	Los Angeles Galaxy	32	14	10	8	47	37	+10	50	2000 MLS Cup Playoffs
6	Dallas Burn	32	14	14	4	54	54	0	46	2000 MLS Cup Playoffs
7	New England Revolution	32	13	13	6	47	49	–2	45	2000 MLS Cup Playoffs
8	Colorado Rapids	32	13	15	4	43	59	–16	43	2000 MLS Cup Playoffs
9	Miami Fusion	32	12	15	5	54	56	–2	41
10	Columbus Crew	32	11	16	5	48	58	–10	38
11	D.C. United	32	8	18	6	44	63	–19	30
12	San Jose Earthquakes	32	7	17	8	35	50	–15	29

Source: MLSSoccer.com
Rules for classification: 1st points; 2nd head-to-head record; 3rd goal difference; 4th number of goals scored.
(SS) = MLS Supporters' Shield; (E1) = Eastern Division champion, (C1) = Central Division champion, (W1) = Western Division champion
Only applicable when the season is not finished:
(Q) = Qualified for the MLS Cup Playoffs, but not yet to the particular round indicated; (E) = Eliminated from playoff-contention.
