= John Richard Smith =

John Richard Smith may refer to:

- John Richard Smith (footballer, born 1898) (1898–1986), English footballer born in Bristol
- John Smith (footballer, born 1971), English footballer born in Wigan, Lancashire

== See also ==
- John R. Smith (disambiguation)
- John Smith (disambiguation)
