= Nate Houser =

American soccer player and coach

Personal information
- Date of birth: October 8, 1972 (age 54)
- Place of birth: Poway, California, U.S.
- Height: 6 ft 3 in (1.91 m)
- Positions: Midfielder; forward

College career
Years	Team	Apps	(Gls)
1990–1993	Baker Wildcats		

Senior career*
Years	Team	Apps	(Gls)
1993–2004	Kansas City Attack (indoor)		
1996	Hampton Roads Mariners		
1997	Rochester Rhinos	21	(0)
2000	Milwaukee Rampage	26	(4)
2004–2005	St. Louis Steamers (indoor)	19	(4)
2005	Baltimore Blast (indoor)	10	(1)
2010–2011	Missouri Comets (indoor)		

Managerial career
- 2003–2013: Baker Wildcats (women)
- 2005–2008: Kansas Rush (academy)
- 2008–2021: Kansas City Fusion (academy)
- 2008–2022: Baker Wildcats (men)
- * Club domestic league appearances and goals

Nate Houser is an American retired soccer player who is currently the Baker University associate vice president of advancement and senior advisor for DE&I initiatives. He played professionally in the A-League, National Professional Soccer League and second Major Indoor Soccer League.

== Player ==
In 1990, Houser graduated from Poway High School. He attended Baker University, playing on the men's soccer team from 1990 to 1993. He graduated with a bachelor's degree in history and political science. In 2007, Baker University inducted Houser into its Athletic Hall of Fame. In 1993, the Wichita Wings drafted Houser in the territorial round of the National Professional Soccer League draft, but traded him to the Kansas City Attack. He went on to play eleven seasons with the Attack. In 1997, Kansas City won the NPSL championship. In addition to playing the winter indoor season with Kansas City, Houser also played outdoors with the Hampton Roads Mariners during the 1996 A-League season and the Rochester Rhinos during the 1997 A-League season. On March 7, 2000, Houser signed with the Milwaukee Rampage. On November 1, 2004, Houser joined the St. Louis Steamers. On March 19, 2005, the Steamers traded Houser and Mike Apple to the Baltimore Blast for Carlos Farias. In October 2010, he signed a one-year contract with the Missouri Comets.

== Coach ==
In 2003, Baker University hired Houser to coach its women's soccer team. In 2008, he also became the head coach of the men's soccer team. In 2010, he led the women to their first NAIA National Tournament appearance. They made it all the way to the Fab Four. In 2011 the women returned to the national tournament making it to the quarterfinals. In 2008 the boys made their first NAIA sweet 16 appearance and in 2011 the boys made it to the Fab-Four.

Houser was named Baker's athletic director in 2017, a position he held until 2022. In August 2022, Houser took on a new role with Baker University as the school's associate vice president of advancement and senior advisor for DE&I initiatives.
