= Keough Award =

Association football award

The Keough Family Award and the Chalupny Award are awards given to the top male and female soccer players from the St. Louis, Missouri area. The award was established as the Keough Award in 2004 and named after former United States men's national soccer team member and St. Louis University men's soccer coach Harry Keough and his son Ty. In 2023, the women's award was renamed after United States women's national soccer team member and five-time award recipient Lori Chalupny.

== Winners ==
Year	Male Winner	Female Winner
2004	Taylor Twellman (New England Revolution)	Lori Chalupny (North Carolina Tar Heels)
2005	Daryl Doran (coach, St. Louis Steamers)	Meghann Burke (Bristol Rovers)
2006	Steve Ralston (New England Revolution)	Kati Jo Spisak (Washington Freedom)
2007	Brian McBride (Fulham)	Lori Chalupny (River Cities Futbol Club)
2008	Taylor Twellman (New England Revolution)	Lori Chalupny (Saint Louis Athletica)
2009	Mike Sorber (asst. coach, USMNT)	Becky Sauerbrunn (Washington Freedom)
2010	Brad Davis (Houston Dynamo)	Lori Chalupny (Atlanta Beat)
2011	Brad Davis (Houston Dynamo)	Becky Sauerbrunn (magicJack)
2012	Tim Ream (Bolton Wanderers)	Becky Sauerbrunn (D.C. United Women)
2013	Brad Davis (Houston Dynamo)	Becky Sauerbrunn (FC Kansas City)
2014	Brad Davis (Houston Dynamo)	Becky Sauerbrunn (FC Kansas City)
2015	Vedad Ibisevic (Hertha BSC)	Lori Chalupny (Chicago Red Stars)
2015	Vedad Ibisevic (Hertha BSC)	Becky Sauerbrunn (FC Kansas City)
2016	Tim Ream (Fulham)	Becky Sauerbrunn (FC Kansas City)
2017	Josh Sargent (St. Louis Scott Gallagher)	Alyssa Mautz (Chicago Red Stars)
2018	Sam Fink (Saint Louis FC)	Lindsay Eversmeyer (coach, Fire & Ice SC)
2019	Will Bruin (Seattle Sounders)	Alli Klug (Saint Louis Billikens)
2020	No award due to COVID-19 pandemic	
2021	No award due to COVID-19 pandemic	
2022	No award due to COVID-19 pandemic	
2023	Joe Willis (Nashville SC)	Lyndsey Heckel (Saint Louis Billikens)
2024	Pat Noonan (coach, FC Cincinnati)	Kirsten Wright (Racing Louisville)
2025	Simon Becher (St. Louis City)	Sarah Luebbert (Club América)
2026	Tom Barlow (Chicago Fire)	Caroline Birkel (Stanford Cardinal)
