= Sebastian Barnes =

Sebastian Barnes is the name of:

- Sebastian Barnes (footballer) (born 1976), Ghanaian footballer
- Sebastian Barnes (Neighbours), a fictional character from Neighbours who was also known as 'Will Griggs'
