= John R. Smith =

John R. Smith may refer to:

- John R. Smith (agriculture commissioner) (19th century), American politician from North Carolina
- John R. Smith (politician, born 1945), politician from Leesville, Louisiana
- John Raphael Smith (1751–1812), English painter
- John Robert Smith (21st century), American politician from Mississippi
- John Roxburgh Smith (1939–2018), Canadian politician in the Legislative Assembly of Ontario
- John Rubens Smith (1775–1849), American painter
- John Russell Smith (1810–1894), English bookseller and bibliographer
- John Richard Smith (footballer, born 1898) (1898–1986), English footballer
- John Smith (footballer, born 1971) (John Richard Smith), English footballer
