= St. Louis Steamers =

St. Louis Steamers has been the name of two different indoor soccer franchises based in St. Louis, Missouri:

- St. Louis Steamers (1979–88); American soccer team which played in the first Major Indoor Soccer League
- St. Louis Steamers (1998–2006); American soccer team which played in the World Indoor Soccer League and second Major Indoor Soccer League
