= Carlos Farias =

Chilean soccer player (born 1976)

Chile Farias
Personal information
- Full name: Carlos Farias
- Date of birth: May 15, 1976 (age 50)
- Place of birth: Santiago, Chile
- Height: 5 ft 6 in (1.68 m)
- Position: Forward

Senior career*
Years	Team	Apps	(Gls)
1996	San Jose Clash	0	(0)
1996	San Diego Sockers (indoor)	27	(28)
1997	Orange County Zodiac	7	(0)
1997–1998	Harrisburg Heat (indoor)	9	(2)
1998	San Diego Flash	20	(9)
1999	San Jose Clash	2	(0)
1999–2000	San Diego Flash	46	(20)
1999	Arizona Thunder (indoor)	8	(9)
2001	El Paso Patriots	16	(5)
2001–2003	San Diego Sockers (indoor)	58	(59)
2003–2005	Baltimore Blast (indoor)	60	(44)
2005–2006	St. Louis Steamers (indoor)	39	(22)
2006–2007	Detroit Ignition (indoor)	26	(19)
2007–2008	Chicago Storm (indoor)	24	(16)
2010–2011	Omaha Vipers (indoor)	14	(17)
2011–2012	Wichita Wings (indoor)	10	(5)
2011–2012	Rochester Lancers (indoor)	13	(8)
2012–2013	Chicago Soul FC (indoor)	28	(22)
2013–2014	Hidalgo La Fiera (indoor)	15	(16)
2014–2015	Oxford City FC of Texas (indoor)	15	(6)
2014–2015	Wichita B-52s (indoor)	2	(2)
2015–2016	Cedar Rapids Rampage (indoor)	10	(8)
2016–2017	Harrisburg Heat (indoor)	8	(0)
2017–2019	Monterrey Flash (indoor)	41	(18)
2021	Ontario Fury (indoor)	2	(0)
- * Club domestic league appearances and goals as of 17 June 2022

Carlos "Chile" Farias (born May 15, 1976 in Santiago, Chile) is a Chilean soccer forward who has spent his entire professional career in the United States. Over the years, he has played in five indoor and outdoor leagues, including Major League Soccer. He currently plays with the Ontario Fury in the Major Arena Soccer League. He also has a wife, Jacqueline, and two children, David and Favian.

== History ==
In March 1996, the San Jose Clash of Major League Soccer selected Farias in the fifteenth round (148th overall) of the 1996 MLS Inaugural Player Draft. Farias never played a league game with the Clash before being waived on March 26, 1996. He then signed with the San Diego Sockers of the Continental Indoor Soccer League (CISL) where he was the CISL Rookie of the Year. The Sockers folded after the 1996 season and he spent the first half of 1997 with Indiana Twisters before moving to the Detroit Safari. Farias is next listed with the Harrisburg Heat of the indoor National Professional Soccer League (NPSL). He played only nine games with the Heat that season. In the spring of 1998, Farias signed with the San Diego Flash of the USISL. In February 1999, the Clash selected Farias in the second round (15th overall) of the 1999 MLS Supplemental Draft. He played two games, starting one, with the Clash. On April 2, 1999, the Clash waived Farias for a second time. He then rejoined the Flash where he played twenty-three games, scoring fifteen goals, gaining first team All Star recognition. That fall, he then played a few games with the Arizona Thunder of the World Indoor Soccer League. Farias played one more outdoor season with the Flash in 2000. In 2001, he split his time between the outdoor El Paso Patriots of the USL A-League and the indoor San Diego Sockers of the WISL. He was a first team All Star with the Sockers. Following his 2001 season with the Patriots, Farias gave up on the outdoor game and has devoted himself to indoor soccer. He remained with the Sockers as they moved to the Major Indoor Soccer League in 2002, being selected as a second team 2002–2003 All Star. On July 16, 2003, the Sockers traded Farias and two picks in the 2003 Amateur Draft to the Baltimore Blast in exchange for Sean Bowers. Farias and his team mates won the 2003–2004 MISL Championship and Farias was selected as a first team All Star. He then began the 2004–2005 season in Baltimore, but on March 18, 2005, the Blast traded him to the St. Louis Steamers in exchange for Mike Apple and Nate Houser. Farias finished the last eleven games of the 2004–2005 season in St. Louis, then played the entire 2005–2006 season in St. Louis. That year, the Steamers went to the MISL Championship and Farias was a second team All Star. On June 20, 2006, the Detroit Ignition picked Farias in the 2006 MISL Expansion Draft. In June 2007, Farias was again selected in the MISL Expansion Draft, this time by the Chicago Storm. In September 2010, Farias was signed by the expansion Omaha Vipers. Although being ranked as the number two scorer in the League, Farias was inexplicably released from his contract by the Vipers in February 2011. On June 9, 2011, the Wichita Wings of the MISL announced that they have signed Farias for the 2011 season. This was their first signing as an expansion team.

== Honors ==
CISL Rookie of the Year: 1996

First Team All Star

- USL A-League: 1999
- WISL: 2001
- MISL: 2004
