= Mike Apple =

American soccer player

Personal information
- Full name: Michael Apple
- Date of birth: June 4, 1978 (age 48)
- Place of birth: Akron, Ohio, United States
- Height: 6 ft 1 in (1.85 m)
- Positions: Midfielder; forward

College career
Years	Team	Apps	(Gls)
1995–1998	Akron Zips		

Senior career*
Years	Team	Apps	(Gls)
1999–2002	Pittsburgh Riverhounds	73	(18)
1999–2000	→ Petro Płock (loan)	1	(0)
1999–2000	Cleveland Crunch (indoor)	21	(3)
2003	Cincinnati Riverhawks	9	(1)
2003–2005	St. Louis Steamers (indoor)	49	(34)
2004	Pittsburgh Riverhounds	8	(0)
2005	Baltimore Blast (indoor)	8	(2)
2005–2006	St. Louis Steamers (indoor)	28	(17)
2006	Pittsburgh Riverhounds	15	(3)
2006–2009	Detroit Ignition (indoor)	60	(39)

International career
2008	U.S. Futsal		
- * Club domestic league appearances and goals

Michael Apple (born June 4, 1978) is an American former soccer player who played professionally in the USL A-League and several American indoor leagues. He was a member of the United States national futsal team at the 2008 FIFA Futsal World Cup.

== Career ==
Apple attended Akron University where he played on the men's soccer team from 1995 to 1998. He was a 1998 Third Team All American with the Zips. Apple finished his bachelor's degree in sports management at Robert Morris University.

In 1999, the Lehigh Valley Steam selected Apple in the first round (twenty-seventh) overall of the USL A-League draft. The Steam traded him to the expansion Pittsburgh Riverhounds during the pre-season. Apple would go on to play four seasons for the Riverhounds. In addition to playing the outdoor summer season with the Riverhounds, Apple also played the winter seasons, usually with indoor teams. However, in October 1999, he moved to Poland where he played briefly for Petro Płock. He returned to the United States and joined the Cleveland Crunch of the National Professional Soccer League for the end of the 1999–2000 season. In 2003, Apple moved to the Cincinnati Riverhawks before rejoining the Riverhounds in 2004. In the fall of 2003, Apple signed with the St. Louis Steamers of the second Major Indoor Soccer League. On March 18, 2005, the Steamers traded Apple and Nate Houser to the Baltimore Blast in exchange for Carlos Farias. He finished the season with the Blast. In November 2005, the Blast traded Apple to back to the St. Louis for future considerations. The Steamers folded at the end of the season and in September 2006, the Detroit Ignition selected Apple in the dispersal draft. That year, Apple played his last season with the Riverhounds. He spent three seasons with the Ignition, the last in the Xtreme Soccer League. That season, the Ignition won the league title.
