= Brian Japp =

American soccer player and coach

Personal information
- Place of birth: United States
- Height: 5 ft 9 in (1.75 m)
- Position: Defender

College career
Years	Team	Apps	(Gls)
1983–1985	UNC Greensboro Spartans		

Senior career*
Years	Team	Apps	(Gls)
1989–1991	Miami Freedom		
1993–1995	Greensboro Dynamo	42	(4)
1997	Carolina Dynamo	1	(0)

Managerial career
- 2014: Gate City FC
- * Club domestic league appearances and goals

Brian Japp is an American retired soccer defender who played professionally in the USISL A-League and American Professional Soccer League.

In 1983, Japp graduated from North Miami Senior High School. In 2013, the school inducted him into its Hall of Fame. Japp attended the University of North Carolina at Greensboro, playing on the men's soccer team from 1983 to 1985. Greensboro won the 1983 and 1985 NCAA Division III Men's Soccer Championship. In the 1985 final, UNC Greensboro defeated Washington University in St. Louis 5–0. Japp assisted on the first two goals. Japp was a 1985 NCAA Division III First Team All American. He played amateur soccer with the Hollywood Kickers of South Florida. In 1989, he turned professional with the Miami Sharks of the American Soccer League. He played for Miami until 1991. By then, they were known as the Miami Freedom and were competing in the American Professional Soccer League. In 1993, Japp joined the Greensboro Dynamo of the USISL. In 1994, the Dynamo won the USISL championship, in penalty kicks, over the Minnesota Thunder. Japp kicked the winning goal. In 1995, the Dynamo played in the USISL Pro League. In 1997, Japp returned to the Dynamo, playing in the USISL A-League, for one game.

== Coaching career ==
Japp was named the Vice President and Head Coach of the newly formed Gate City FC of the National Premier Soccer League on November 4, 2013.
