= Juan Castillo =

Juan Castillo may refer to:

== Sports ==
=== Association football ===
- Juan de Dios Castillo (1951–2014), Mexican football forward and manager
- Juani (Juan José Castillo, born 1955), Spanish football midfielder
- Juan Castillo (footballer, born 1970), Chilean football forward
- Juan Castillo (soccer, born 1972), American soccer midfielder
- Juan Castillo (footballer, born 1978), Uruguayan football goalkeeper
- Juan José Castillo (footballer, born 1980), Guatemalan football forward
- Juan Castillo (footballer, born 2000), Dominican Republic football left-back
- Juan Castillo (footballer, born 2002), Colombian footballer
- Juan Diego Castillo (born 2003), Colombian footballer

=== Other sports ===
- Juan Castillo (American football) (born 1959), American football coach
- Juan Castillo (second baseman) (born 1962), Dominican baseball infielder
- Juan Carlos Castillo (1964–1993), Colombian cyclist
- José Castillo (runner) (Juan José Castillo, born 1968), Peruvian long-distance runner
- Juan Castillo (pitcher) (born 1970), Venezuelan baseball pitcher

== Others ==
- Juan de Castillo (1470–1552), Portuguese architect
- Juan del Castillo (bishop) (died 1593), Spanish Roman Catholic bishop
- Juan del Castillo (painter) (c. 1590–c. 1657), Spanish Baroque painter
- Juan de Castillo (Jesuit) (1595–1628), Spanish Jesuit priest
- Juan Diego del Castillo (1744–1793), Spanish botanist
- Juan Castillo (Uruguayan politician) (born 1952), Uruguayan politician and trade unionist

== See also ==
- Juan Castilla (disambiguation)
- John Castillo (disambiguation)
