= Brian Loftin =

Brian Loftin may refer to:

- Brian Loftin (soccer) (born 1972), American soccer forward
- Brian Loftin (racing driver) (born 1977), American stock car racing driver
