= Juan Castilla =

Juan Castilla may refer to:

- Juan de Castilla y Haro (died 1326), Spanish nobleman
- Juan de Castilla (1460–1520), Spanish prelate
- Juan Carlos Castilla (marine biologist) (born 1940), Chilean marine biologist
- Juan José Castilla (born 1945), Mexican heptathlete
- Juan Carlos Castilla (footballer) (born 1978), Spanish football goalkeeper
- Juan Castilla (footballer) (born 2004), Colombian football midfielder

== See also ==
- Juan Castillo (disambiguation)
