= Dan Calichman =

American soccer player (born 1968)

Personal information
- Full name: Daniel Jacob Calichman
- Date of birth: February 21, 1968 (age 58)
- Place of birth: Huntington Station, New York, U.S.
- Height: 6 ft 1 in (1.85 m)
- Position: Defender

College career
Years	Team	Apps	(Gls)
1986–1990	Williams Ephs		

Senior career*
Years	Team	Apps	(Gls)
1990–1993	Sanfrecce Hiroshima	50+	(1+)
1994	Boston Storm		
1995	New York Centaurs		
1996–1998	LA Galaxy	68	(0)
1999–2000	New England Revolution	29	(0)
2000	San Jose Earthquakes	16	(0)
2001	Charleston Battery	22	(1)
Total		185+	(2+)

International career
1997	United States	2	(0)

Managerial career
- 2002–2014: Claremont-Mudd-Scripps Stags
- 2010–2011: New York Cosmos (youth)
- 2011–2013: Chivas USA (youth)
- 2014–2020: Toronto FC (assistant)
- 2021–: LA Galaxy (assistant)
- * Club domestic league appearances and goals

Daniel Jacob Calichman (born February 21, 1968) is an American soccer coach and retired player. He played as a defender and is an assistant coach for Major League Soccer club LA Galaxy.

== Playing career ==
=== College ===
Calichman played college soccer at Williams College, where he was a three-time NCAA Division III All-American.

=== Professional ===
Calichman began his professional career in Japan, first for Mazda in the Japan Soccer League in 1990 and 1991, and then for its successor Sanfrecce Hiroshima in the newly formed J. League Division 1 in 1992 and 1993. Calichman became the first American to play in the J-League. In 1995, he moved back to the United States and played for Boston Storm and New York Centaurs in the A-League.

In 1996, Calichman was allocated to Los Angeles Galaxy of Major League Soccer. He captained the team for three seasons, earning All-Star recognition in 1996, until a trade to New England Revolution before the 1999 season. He ended his MLS career splitting 2000 between the Revs and San Jose Earthquakes and spent 2001 in the A-League with Charleston Battery. He retired from competitive soccer at the end of the 2001 season. Calichman held the captain armband for the Earthquakes when John Doyle wasn't in the lineup.

Calichman was honored by the Galaxy in a pre-game match ceremony on April 4, 2009.

=== International ===
Calichman was capped two times for the United States national team, both in 1997.

== Coaching career ==
In 2002, Calichman was appointed as head coach of the men's soccer team at Claremont McKenna College in Claremont, California. In 2007, Calichman also became the director of player development for Southern California-based youth soccer organization LAFC Chelsea. The club later became part of first the New York Cosmos and then the Chivas USA academy setups. From 2014 until 2020, he was an assistant coach for the Major League Soccer team Toronto FC under head coach Greg Vanney. In 2021, he moved to LA Galaxy to serve as an assistant coach.

== Career statistics ==
=== Club ===
Appearances and goals by club, season and competition
Club	Season	League			Domestic Cup (Note: Includes the Emperor's Cup and U.S. Open Cup)		League Cup (Note: Includes the JSL Cup and J.League Cup)		Continental		Other		Total	
Club	Season	Division	Apps	Goals	Apps	Goals	Apps	Goals	Apps	Goals	Apps	Goals	Apps	Goals
Sanfrecce Hiroshima	1990–91	JSL Second Division	26	1			3	1	—		—		29+	2+
Sanfrecce Hiroshima	1991–92	JSL First Division	11	0			0	0	—		—		11+	0+
Sanfrecce Hiroshima	1992	J1 League	—			1	6	1	—		—		6+	2+
Sanfrecce Hiroshima	1993	J1 League	13	0	0	0	1	0	—		—		14	0
Sanfrecce Hiroshima	Total		50+	1+		1+	10	2	0	0	0	0	60+	4+
Boston Storm	1994	USISL			—		—		—		—			
New York Centaurs	1995	A-League					—		—		—			
LA Galaxy	1996	Major League Soccer	28	0	—		—		—		5 (Note: Appearance(s) in the MLS Cup Playoffs)	0	33	0
LA Galaxy	1997	Major League Soccer	32	0	—		—		1 (Note: Appearance in the CONCACAF Champions' Cup)	0	2	0	35	0
LA Galaxy	1998	Major League Soccer	8	0	—		—		—		1	0	9	0
LA Galaxy	Total		68	0	0	0	0	0	1	0	8	0	77	0
New England Revolution	1999	Major League Soccer	25	0	—		—		—		—		25	0
New England Revolution	2000	Major League Soccer	4	0	0	0	—		—		0	0	4	0
New England Revolution	Total		29	0	0	0	0	0	0	0	0	0	29	0
San Jose Earthquakes	2000	Major League Soccer	16	0	2	0	—		—		—		18	0
Charleston Battery	2001	A-League	22	1	2	0	—		—		2 (Note: Appearances in the A-League playoffs)	0	26	1
Career total			185+	2+	4+	1+	10	2	1	0	10	0	210+	5+

=== International ===
Appearances and goals by national team and year
National team	Year	Apps	Goals
United States	1997	2	0
United States	Total	2	0

=== Managerial ===
Managerial record by team and tenure
Team	From	To	Record					
Team	From	To	G	W	L	T	Win %	Ref.
Claremont-Mudd-Scripps Stags	September 6, 2002	September 13, 2014	242	140	82	20	57.85	
Total			242	140	82	20	57.85	

== Honors ==
Individual

- MLS All-Star: 1996

LA Galaxy

- MLS Cup: 2024
