= Mali Walton =

American soccer player

Personal information
- Date of birth: April 25, 1972 (age 54)
- Place of birth: Flint, Michigan, United States
- Height: 6 ft 1 in (1.85 m)
- Positions: Midfielder; defender

Youth career
- 1991–1994: Oakland Golden Grizzlies

Senior career*
Years	Team	Apps	(Gls)
1995	Detroit Neon (indoor)	12	(1)
1995–1997	Tampa Bay Terror (indoor)	80	(16)
1996	Richmond Kickers		
1997–2002	Rochester Rhinos	108	(0)
1997	→ Mid Michigan Bucks (loan)	2	(5)
1997–1999	Philadelphia KiXX (indoor)	45	(11)
1999–2001	Buffalo Blizzard (indoor)	61	(3)
2002	Indiana Blast	24	(0)
2003–2006	St. Louis Steamers (indoor)	101	(4)
2008–2010	St. Louis Illusion (indoor)	8	(1)
- * Club domestic league appearances and goals

Mali Walton is a retired American soccer player who played professionally in the National Professional Soccer League and USL A-League. He won the 1998, 2000 and 2001 USL A-League and the 1999 U.S. Open Cup championships with the Rochester Rhinos.

Walton attended Michigan's Oakland University where he was a 1992-94 All American soccer player. He graduated with a bachelor's degree in sociology. In 2002, Oakland University inducted Walton into its Athletic Hall of Fame. On May 31, 1995, Walton turned professional with the Detroit Neon of the Continental Indoor Soccer League. In the fall of 1995, he moved to the Tampa Bay Terror of the National Professional Soccer League. He spent two winter, indoor seasons with the Terror.

In 1996, Walton began his outdoor career with the Richmond Kickers of the USISL Select League. In 1997, Walton moved to the Rochester Rhinos of the USL A-League. He played only six games for Rochester that season, going on loan to the Mid Michigan Bucks of the USISL PDSL for two games. Walton would go on to play six seasons with the Rhinos, winning the 1998, 2000 and 2001 league championships and the 1999 U.S. Open Cup with them. While playing outdoors with the Rhinos, Walton continued with his indoor career. From 1997 to 1999, he played for the Philadelphia KiXX and from 1999 to 2001 with the Buffalo Blizzard, both in the NPSL.

In 2001, the Baltimore Blast acquired the rights to Walton in the NPSL Dispersal Draft. Walton refused to play for the Blast and on August 27, 2003, the Blast sent the rights to Walton's contract to the St. Louis Steamers. Walton signed with the Steamers and played for them until the team ceased operations in 2006. In 2003, Walton finished his outdoor career with the Indiana Blast. In 2008, he returned to indoor soccer with the St. Louis Illusion of the Premier Arena Soccer League, playing a handful of games over two seasons.
