= John Waite (footballer) =

English footballer and manager

Personal information
- Full name: John Aidan Waite
- Date of birth: 16 January 1942
- Place of birth: Wellingore, Lincolnshire, England
- Date of death: 3 April 2016 (aged 74)
- Position: Winger

Senior career*
Years	Team	Apps	(Gls)
1961–1963	Grimsby Town	8	(1)
- Gainsborough Trinity
- Keelby

Managerial career
- Immingham Town
- * Club domestic league appearances and goals

John Aidan Waite (16 January 1942 – 3 April 2016) was an English professional football player and manager. He played for Grimsby Town, Gainsborough Trinity and Keelby, and managed Immingham Town.

Waite was born on 16 January 1942 in Wellingore, Lincolnshire, and raised in Grimsby. His father Reg taught English to girls at Wintringham Grammar School (now Oasis Academy). His mother Betty was of the Steel family, who believed John got his athleticism from her brothers, Jack and Walter, Wellingore football players in the 1930s.

Waite also played cricket during the summer months. He bowled for several teams, including Lincolnshire Colts, Cleethorpes Town, British Titan Products and Lindsey Oil Refinery.

Waite also wrote a weekly column for the Grimsby Telegraph. He also reported live on running matches on local radio.

Waite married his childhood sweetheart Susan Dale, who lived in the same neighborhood, in 1963. They had two children, Sally and Mark, the latter a professional soccer coach in the United States. Waite died on 3 April 2016. He was 74.
