= Kevin Koetters =

American soccer player and coach

Personal information
- Date of birth: September 11, 1968 (age 58)
- Place of birth: Quincy, Illinois, United States
- Height: 6 ft 0 in (1.83 m)
- Position: Midfielder

College career
Years	Team	Apps	(Gls)
1986–1990	Rockhurst Hawks		

Senior career*
Years	Team	Apps	(Gls)
1990	Colorado Foxes		
1991–1999	Kansas City Attack (indoor)	261	(?)
1993	San Diego Sockers (indoor)		
1996	Kansas City Wiz	15	(0)
1997	Rochester Rhinos	22	(0)
1999–2000	Detroit Rockers (indoor)	1	(0)
2000–2001	St. Louis Steamers (indoor)		
2001–2002	Kansas City Comets	40	(31)
- * Club domestic league appearances and goals

Kevin Koetters (born September 11, 1968, in Quincy, Illinois) is a retired U.S. soccer midfielder who spent most of his career in the U.S. indoor leagues as well as one with the Kansas City Wiz in Major League Soccer, one in the American Professional Soccer League and one in the USISL.

Koetters attended Rockhurst University, where he was a 1989 second-team NAIA All-American. In 1990, he played for the Colorado Foxes in the American Professional Soccer League. In 1991, he signed with the Kansas City Attack in the National Professional Soccer League. He remained with the Attack through the 1998–1999 season. During these years, Koetters would play for the Attack during the winter, then spend time with other teams during the summer season. In 1993, he played for the San Diego Sockers of the Continental Indoor Soccer League. In February 1996, the Kansas City Wiz selected Koetters in the 12th round (116th overall) of the 1996 MLS Inaugural Player Draft. He saw time in 15 games before being released at the end of the season. In 1997, he played for the Rochester Rhinos in the USISL. He then played one game for the Detroit Rockers during the 1999-2000 NPSL season. In 2000, he signed with the St. Louis Steamers in the World Indoor Soccer League. He also played the 2001 season with them. He played for the Kansas City Comets of the Major Indoor Soccer League from 2001 to 2002.

In 2005, he became the head coach of Gardner Edgerton High School.
