= Gate City FC =

Former soccer team based in Greensboro, North Carolina

- Full name: Gate City Football Club
- Nickname: The Generals
- Founded: 2013
- Dissolved: Hiatus
- Ground: Armfield Athletic Center
- Capacity: 2,200
- Chairman/President: Justin R. Cox
- VP/Head Coach: Brian Japp
- Website: http://www.gatecityfc.com

Gate City FC was an American soccer club based in Greensboro, North Carolina fielding a first team along with a reserve and alumni/veteran team in other league play. Gate City FC was established in May 2013 and played one season (2014) in the National Premier Soccer League (NPSL), the fourth tier of the American Soccer Pyramid, in the Mid-Atlantic Conference in 2014. The club was owned by local businessman Justin Cox.

The team played its home games at the Armfield Athletic Center at Guilford College in Greensboro.

== History ==
The club was officially accepted into the National Premier Soccer League on Monday, November 4, 2013. After playing in the NPSL for a single season, Gate City FC was dropped for the 2015, and could no longer play at Guildford College, for financial reasons.

The team was the subject of some controversy in 2015 after they posted a schedule including several games against United Soccer League teams. Those teams reported never agreeing to those matches, which were later removed from the Gate City FC website.

== Stadium ==
- Armfield Athletic Center; Greensboro, North Carolina

== See also ==
- List of National Premier Soccer League teams
