= John Castillo =

John Castillo may refer to:

- John Castillo (poet) (1792–1845), British poet
- John Castillo (footballer) (born 1983), Colombian footballer for UES in El Salvador
- John Jairo Castillo (born 1984), Colombian footballer for Club Universidad de Guadalajara in Mexico

== See also ==
- Juan Castillo (disambiguation)
