= Brian Loftin (soccer) =

American soccer player (born 1972)

Personal information
- Full name: Brian James Loftin
- Date of birth: April 4, 1972 (age 54)
- Place of birth: Kansas City, Missouri, U.S.
- Height: 5 ft 10 in (1.78 m)
- Position: Forward

College career
Years	Team	Apps	(Gls)
1991–1992	Army Cadets		
1993–1994	Evansville Purple Aces		

Senior career*
Years	Team	Apps	(Gls)
1994–1998	Kansas City Attack (indoor)	148	(142)
1997	Carolina Dynamo	32	(15)
1998	Tampa Bay Mutiny	8	(0)
1998	→ Charleston Battery (loan)	5	(2)
1999–2000	Milwaukee Rampage	42	(15)
1999–2003	Milwaukee Wave (indoor)	151	(138)

International career
1996–2000	U.S. Futsal	12	(5)
- * Club domestic league appearances and goals

Brian Loftin (born April 4, 1972) is an American retired soccer forward and was the commissioner of the Xtreme Soccer League. He played one season in Major League Soccer with the Tampa Bay Mutiny, as well as several seasons in the USISL. However, his greatest fame as a player came in eight seasons of indoor soccer where he was a consistent scoring threat with the Kansas City Attack and Milwaukee Wave. He also earned twelve caps, scoring five goals, with the United States national futsal team.

== Playing career ==
Loftin graduated in 1990 from The Barstow School, an independent private school in Kansas City, Missouri, before attending the U.S. Military Academy at West Point for two years where he was a 1992 All Patriot League soccer player. He transferred to the University of Evansville in 1993. After completing his collegiate eligibility in the fall of 1994, Loftin attended an open tryout with the Kansas City Attack of the National Professional Soccer League. He impressed the coaches and was signed to a contract, becoming a regular on the Attack front line for four seasons. In 1997, he played for the Carolina Dynamo in the USISL. In March 1998, the Tampa Bay Mutiny selected Loftin in the first round (second overall) in the 1998 MLS Supplemental Draft. He played eight games for the Mutiny that season. He also played five games for the Charleston Battery of USISL. In April 1999, he signed with the Milwaukee Rampage of the USL A-League. He would play outdoor summer soccer with the Rampage through the 2000 season. In 2000, he was First Team All League with the Rampage. Loftin also signed with the Milwaukee Wave of the NPSL and remained with them for four seasons before retiring in 2003. One of his most notable goals came in the Game 5 of the 2000 NPSL finals, in which Loftin executed a spectacular bicycle kick to score. In his last two seasons, the Wave played in the Major Indoor Soccer League. Loftin also earned twelve caps, scoring five goals, with the U.S. national futsal team between 1996 and 2000.

== Executive career ==
In between his playing career with the Wave and becoming commissioner of the XSL, Loftin was the GM/CEO of the Chicago Storm.
