= Nick Igel =

American soccer player

Personal information
- Full name: Nicholas Igel
- Date of birth: March 7, 1972 (age 54)
- Place of birth: Columbus, Ohio, U.S.
- Height: 5 ft 10 in (1.78 m)
- Positions: Forward; midfielder

College career
Years	Team	Apps	(Gls)
1990–1993	Dayton Flyers		

Senior career*
Years	Team	Apps	(Gls)
1994–1996	Ohio Xoggz		
1996–1997	Columbus Invaders (indoor)	27	(20)
1997–1999	Milwaukee Rampage	51	(10)
1998–1999	Milwaukee Wave (indoor)	28	(12)
2000–2003	Milwaukee Bavarians		
- * Club domestic league appearances and goals

Nicholas Igel is an American retired soccer player who played professionally in the National Professional Soccer League and Eastern Indoor Soccer League.

Igel attended the University of Dayton, playing on the men's soccer team from 1990 to 1993. He scored twenty-five goals and added seventeen assists in his seventy games there.

From 1994 to 1996, he played for the Columbus Xoggz of the USISL. He was a Midwest Division All Star in 1995. In the fall of 1996, Igel joined the Columbus Invaders of the National Indoor Professional Soccer League for one season. In 1997, he moved to the Milwaukee Rampage of the USISL A-League, winning the 1997 league title in penalty kicks. In the championship game, Igel was one of three Rampage players who made their kicks to seal the title for Milwaukee. Igel played three seasons for the Rampage in addition to one season for the Milwaukee Wave (1998–1999) of the NPSL. From 2000 to at least 2003, he played for the amateur Milwaukee Bavarians.
