= Tim Geltz =

American soccer player and coach

Personal information
- Positions: Forward; midfielder

College career
Years	Team	Apps	(Gls)
1988–1991	South Florida Bulls		

Senior career*
Years	Team	Apps	(Gls)
1992–1993	Orlando Lions		
1994	Cocoa Expos		
1996	Jacksonville Cyclones		
1997	Orlando Sundogs	16	(3)
1997	Nashville Metros	5	(0)
1998	Orlando Nighthawks		
1998	Jacksonville Cyclones	3	(0)
1999	Central Florida Kraze		

International career
1987–1988	United States U20		

Managerial career
- Rollins College - Assistant Women's Coach 1997-1999
- * Club domestic league appearances and goals

Tim Geltz is an American soccer player and coach who played professionally in the USISL A-League, with the US National Team and internationally.

Geltz graduated from Bishop Moore High School in Orlando, Florida. Geltz was a four-time All State as well as a 1988 Parade Magazine High School All American and 1988 NSCAA High School All American soccer player. He also played for the United States men's national under-20 soccer team in 1987 and 1988. In 1994, Bishop Moore inducted Geltz into its Hall of Fame. Geltz attended the University of South Florida, playing on the men's soccer team from 1988 to 1991.

In 1992, Geltz turned professional with the Orlando Lions of the USISL. In 1994, he moved to the Cocoa Expos. In 1996, Geltz joined the Jacksonville Cyclones. In 1997, he began the season with the Orlando Sundogs but moved to the Nashville Metros at midseason. In 1998, he returned to Florida where he began playing for the Jacksonville Cyclones, then finished the season with the Orlando Nighthawks. In 1999, he ended his career with the Central Florida Kraze.

Geltz spent time playing and training internationally in the 1990's with stints in Argentina (Boca Juniors), France (L'Orient) and Germany (Frankfurt).

His coaching experience includes high school, college (Rollins College) and ECNL coaching.

Geltz founded and coached the NPSL team Kraze United with Joe Avallone, Didier Menard and Ray Collado.

He is a founding member of what is now Florida Kraze Krush, founding Kraze Krush with Joe Avallone in the early 2000s. He holds multiple US Soccer coaching licenses and continues to coach high level teams.

Geltz is the older brother of Amy Geltz, who played in the W-League.
