= Dale Mulholland =

American soccer player and coach

Personal information
- Date of birth: August 16, 1964 (age 62)
- Place of birth: Tacoma, Washington, U.S.
- Height: 6 ft 0 in (1.83 m)
- Position: Forward

Youth career
- 1980–1983: Tacoma Rovers State Premier
- 1983: Washington State U-19 State Team
- 1984: Washington State Open Select Team
- 1985: FC Tacoma City Select Team City Premier

Senior career*
Years	Team	Apps	(Gls)
1985	TSV Reichenbach 05		
1987–1988	TSV Reichenbach 05		
1989	Orlando Lions		
1989–1990	Sing Tao Tigers		
1990	Lokomotiv Moscow	6	(1)
1991–1992	Miami Freedom		
1992	Dukla Prague	7	(0)
1994–1995	Seattle Sounders		

Managerial career
- 1996: Tero Sasana
- 1999–2000: Persija Timur
- 2002–2007: Euro Soccer Excellence
- 2007–2011: Arsenal Soccer Schools
- * Club domestic league appearances and goals

Dale Mulholland (born August 16, 1964) is an American former soccer player and coach. As a player, he played in West Germany, the Soviet Union, Czechoslovakia and his native United States. His most notable achievement as a player was signing for Lokomotiv Moscow in 1990. As a coach he has worked in Thailand, Indonesia, and the United States.

== Early life ==
Mulholland was born in Tacoma, Washington, in 1964. He attended University of Puget Sound and Warner Pacific College, where he majored in philosophy.

== Playing career ==
In 1990, he was traded by the Orlando Lions in the American Professional Soccer League to Lokomotiv Moscow in the Soviet First League for Aleksandr Golovnya. He signed a one-year contract, becoming the first American to play in the USSR. Mulholland scored once in Moscow, a penalty in a match against FC Kuzbass Kemerovo in Locomotiv's last match of the 1990 Soviet First League.

In 1991, he returned to the United States, playing with Miami Freedom of the American Professional Soccer League (APSL) during the summer of 1991 for the short American outdoor season.

Mulholland made seven league appearances for Dukla Prague during the second half of the 1991–92 Czechoslovak First League season.

== Coaching career ==
Served as the Director of Coaching / Head Coach for the Arsenal Soccer Schools franchise for Indonesia, participating in the local men's league with the Jakarta Vikings and formerly playing and managing with the local men's club, 6 times local champions, the Wanderers FC in the JIFL (Jakarta International Football League).
