= Jon Szczepanski =

American soccer player

Personal information
- Place of birth: United States
- Height: 5 ft 10 in (1.78 m)
- Positions: Forward; midfielder

College career
Years	Team	Apps	(Gls)
1985–1988	Milwaukee Panthers		

Senior career*
Years	Team	Apps	(Gls)
1989–1993	Milwaukee Wave (indoor)	104	(35)
1994–1995	Chicago Power (indoor)	29	(12)
1995–1999	Milwaukee Rampage	157	(37)
2000	Milwaukee Bavarians		

Managerial career
- 1996–2001: Milwaukee Lutheran High School
- 1997–1998: Milwaukee Rampage (assistant)
- 2001: Yale Bulldogs (assistant)
- 2002–2003: Wisconsin Badgers (assistant)
- * Club domestic league appearances and goals

Jon Szczepanski is a retired American soccer player who played professionally in the National Professional Soccer League and the USISL A-League.

== Player ==
Szczepanski attended the University of Wisconsin–Milwaukee, playing on the men's soccer team from 1985 to 1988. In 2001, he completed his coursework for a bachelor's degree in community education and policy. In 1989, Szczepanski turned professional with the Milwaukee Wave of the American Indoor Soccer Association after the Wave selected him in the first round (seventh overall) of the AISA amateur draft. In December 1992, the Wave traded Szczepanski to the Canton Invaders for Fahmi El-Shami after Szczepanski did not appear for the Wave that season. However, Szczepanski did not play for the Invaders that season either. In 1994, he moved to the Chicago Power of the National Professional Soccer League for one season. In 1995, Szczepanski joined the Milwaukee Rampage of the USISL Pro League. In February 2000, Szczepanski retired from professional soccer after failing to come to a contract agreement with the Rampage. However, he continued to play, joining the amateur Milwaukee Bavarians that spring.

== Coach ==
From 1992 to 2001, Szczepanski coached the Milwaukee Lutheran High School boys' team. In 1997, he coached the Divine Savior Holy Angels High School girls' team. He also served as an assistant with the Milwaukee Rampage in 1997 and 1998. In 2001, he spent one season as the assistant to the Yale University men's soccer team. In 2002, the University of Wisconsin–Madison hired Szczepanski as an assistant to the men's team Following the 2008–09 season, Szczepanski left UW Madison to become a coach with the Rush Wisconsin Soccer Club where he now is the Boys' Director of Coaching..
