= Maher Atta =

American soccer player

Personal information
- Date of birth: March 23, 1970 (age 56)
- Height: 5 ft 10 in (1.78 m)
- Position: Defender

Youth career
- 1989–1992: Catawba College

Senior career*
Years	Team	Apps	(Gls)
1993–1997	Carolina Dynamo		
1997–1998	Cleveland Crunch (indoor)	1	(0)
1998	Jacksonville Cyclones	17	(0)
1998	Hampton Roads Mariners	4	(0)
1999–2000	Carolina Dynamo	24	(1)
2002	Carolina Dynamo	14	(0)
- * Club domestic league appearances and goals

Maher Atta is a retired soccer defender who played professionally in the USISL A-League and National Professional Soccer League.

Atta attended Catawba College where he played on the men's soccer team from 1989 to 1992. He was a 1992 NAIA Third Team All American. Atta graduated with a bachelor's degree in health and physical fitness. In 1993, Atta turned professional with the Carolina Dynamo of the USISL. He played for the Dynamo until 1997, winning the 1993 and 1994 USISL outdoor titles with them. In November 1997, Atta signed with the Cleveland Crunch of the National Professional Soccer League, but played only one game that season. In 1998, Atta was invited to the Major League Soccer combine, after spending a summer with the Tampa Mutiny playing exhibition games in Miami, Columbia and Peru. Maher was not drafted, However, he signed with the Jacksonville Cyclones. Maher played over 130 games for the Dynamo. That year, he also began working for TEKsystems where he has been for the last 22 years. In 1999, Atta rejoined the Dynamo for two seasons. In 2002, he returned for one more season with Carolina. In 2006, the Dynamo inducted Atta into the team's Hall of Fame. In 2019, Catawba College where Maher played college soccer inducted him into their Hall of Fame. In January 2021, North Carolina Soccer Hall Fame inducted Maher's pro team, Greensboro Dynamo into their National Champions Hall of Honor.
