= Miami Freedom =

Defunct American soccer club

The Miami Sharks were an inaugural franchise of the third incarnation of the American Soccer League in 1988. The team was renamed the Miami Freedom and joined the American Professional Soccer League in 1990 when the ASL merged with the Western Soccer League. The club played in the Orange Bowl in Miami, Florida.

Julio Moreira, a native of Ecuador, was team president and general manager during 1990–1991. He was replaced as team president by David A. Donet, Esq. during a restructuring that also saw the firing of head coach David Irving.

== 1990 ==
In 1990, the Miami Freedom played their first seasons in the new American Professional Soccer League (APSL) in the South Division of the league's East Conference. The other members of the division included the Fort Lauderdale Strikers, which won the division that year, the Tampa Bay Rowdies, Orlando Lions and Washington Diplomats.

While the Freedom were one of the best defensive teams in the league, having only 25 goals scored against them, they had difficulty scoring. The team's leading scorer, Laszlo Barna, with 7 goals and 5 assists, finished the season 18th in the league's ranking.

The Miami Freedom finished this season with an 8-12. Despite this record, the team fell just one victory short of reaching post-season play.

== Rosters ==
1988: Windsor del Llano, Jerry DiPiero, Troy Edwards, Joao Carlos Fietoza, Juan Carlos Gómez, Patrick Johnson, Ricardo Johnson, Paul Khoury, Tommy Lehoczky, Dan Pingrey, Guillermo Pizarro Vaca, Pedro Tavares, Jody Weil, Marc Wolff, Mathieu St. Pierre

1989: Maicol Antelo, Mark Barnett, Scott Bauer, Dennis Brose, Mirko Castillo, Mario Chavez, Teófilo Cubillas, Euclides DeGouveia, Dirceu, Jerry DiPiero, Tchaly Eleazard, Juan Carlos Gómez, Wellington Guerra, Brian Japp, Ricardo Johnson, Hughes Joseph, Francisco Lopez, Willington Oritz, Dan Pingrey, Guillermo Pizarro Vaca, Tab Ramos, Luis Reyna, Arnold Siegmund, Pedro Tavares, Huber Vallejos

1990: Laszlo Barna, Mark Barnett, Michael Brown, Paul Carollo, Euclides DeGouveia, Ricardo Dillon, Ian Fairbrother, Elias Feanny, Joao Carlos Fietoza, Joseph Flood, Decio Guimarães, Timo Hamalainen, Brian Japp, Patrick Johnson, Steve Kinsey, David Kulik, Dorian Mesa, Fernando Ramos, Rick Rivera-Gomez, Arnold Siegmund

1991: Celvin Alonzo, Ricardo Alonso, Alex Bahr, Laszlo Barna, Mark Barnett, Brown, Kenny Borden, Juan Castillo, Chrinos, Hugo DeCasanova, Euclides DeGouveia, Paul Dougherty, John Garvey, Grant Gibbs, Rick Iversen, Brian Japp, Pedro Magallanes, Jimmy McGeough, Dorian Mesa, Dale Mulholland, Benjamin Ortiz, Fernando Ramos, Ken Snow, Juan Valencia, Huber Vallejo, Tony DePhillips, Patrick Johnson

1992: Jose Angulo, Kossivi Asare-Kokou, Mark Barnett, Scott Benedetti, Roger Campagnola, Juan Castillo, Javier Centeno, Zico Doe, Miljice Donev, Chris Edwinson, Kevin Grimes, Darrin Karuzas, John Boa, John Klein, John Maessner, Diego Mandagaran, Luis Medina, Dorian Mesa, Dale Mulholland, Victor Ogunsanya, Boniface Okafor, Rodrique Rocques, Derek Sanderson, Arturo Velazco, Scoop Stanisic, Wilmer Ochoa

== Coaches ==
- Carlos Alberto Torres 1988
- Wim Suurbier 1989
- David Irving (1990–1991)
- Jorge Alzerreca (1991)
- Amancio Suarez (1992)

== Year-by-year ==
Year	Division	League	Reg. season	Playoffs	Open Cup
1988	N/A	ASL	5th, Southern	Did not qualify	Did not enter
1989	N/A	ASL	5th, Southern	Did not qualify	Did not enter
1990	N/A	APSL	4th, ASL South	Did not qualify	Did not enter
1991	N/A	APSL	5th, American	Did not qualify	Did not enter
1992	N/A	APSL	5th	Did not qualify	Did not enter

=== 1992 Professional Cup – North American Club Championship ===
The Professional Cup was a North American club tournament played in 1992. It involved eight teams from the APSL, the Canadian Soccer League, and the National Professional Soccer League. The Miami Freedom were the only APSL club that did not advance beyond the quarterfinals.

==== Quarterfinals ====
August 8, 1992 First Leg	Fort Lauderdale Strikers	2–1	Miami Freedom	Coral Springs, Florida
	Eichmann 41', 66'		Doe 16'	Stadium: Colts Stadium; Attendance: 1,152

August 12, 1992 Second Leg	Miami Freedom	1–3	Fort Lauderdale Strikers	Orange Bowl, Florida
	Doe 89'		McKinley 56'; Kinsey 69'; Muchotrigo 77'	Attendance: 85 (est.)

Fort Lauderdale advances on aggregate, 5–2.
