= Caroline Birkel =

American soccer player (born 2006)

- Birkel with Stanford in 2026

Personal information
- Full name: Caroline Nicole Birkel
- Date of birth: August 25, 2006 (age 20)
- Place of birth: St. Louis, Missouri, U.S.
- Height: 5 ft 11 in (1.80 m)
- Position: Goalkeeper

Team information
- Current team: Stanford Cardinal
- Number: 1

Youth career
- 2012–2025: St. Louis Scott Gallagher

College career
Years	Team	Apps	(Gls)
2025–	Stanford Cardinal	25	(0)

International career^{‡}
2022	United States U-16		
2025	United States U-19	1	(0)
2025–	United States U-20	9	(0)
2026–	United States U-23	2	(0)
- ‡ National team caps and goals as of 00:43, September 12, 2026 (UTC)

Caroline Nicole Birkel (born August 25, 2006) is an American college soccer player who plays as a goalkeeper for the Stanford Cardinal.

== Early life ==
Birkel was born and raised in St. Louis, Missouri, the daughter of Courtney and Mike Birkel, and has two brothers. She played club soccer for St. Louis Scott Gallagher SC, leading the team to two ECNL national championships and being named ECNL All-American twice. She attended Mary Institute and St. Louis Country Day School, where she was a standout in field hockey.

== College career ==
Birkel enrolled early and began training with the Stanford Cardinal in the spring of 2025. In the fall, she became the first true freshman goalkeeper to start for the Cardinal since Jane Campbell in 2013. She helped lead the Cardinal to both the Atlantic Coast Conference (ACC) regular-season and tournament titles, stopping a penalty in the final shootout against Notre Dame. In the NCAA tournament, she helped Stanford reach the final, losing to Florida State. After her freshman season, she was named first-team All-ACC and the ACC Goalkeeper of the Year. She was also presented the Chalupny Award given to the year's most outstanding female soccer player from the St. Louis area.

== International career ==
Birkel was one of two high school players (alongside Addison Halpern) named to the United States under-20 roster for the 2024 FIFA U-20 Women's World Cup, serving as the third-stringer as the team won bronze. She played every minute for the under-20s at the 2026 FIFA U-20 Women's World Cup in Poland, reaching the round of 16, but was unable to stop any penalties in their shootout loss to Brazil.

== Honors and awards ==
Stanford Cardinal

- Atlantic Coast Conference: 2025
- Atlantic Coast Conference tournament: 2025

United States U-20

- FIFA U-20 Women's World Cup bronze medal: 2024

Individual

- ACC Goalkeeper of the Year: 2025
- First-team All-ACC: 2025
- Third-team All-ACC: 2026
- Chalupny Award: 2025
