= Diego Mandagaran =

Uruguayan footballer (born 1963)

Personal information
- Full name: Diego German Mandagaran
- Date of birth: May 14, 1963 (age 63)
- Place of birth: Montevideo, Uruguay
- Height: 5 ft 9 in (1.75 m)
- Position: Midfielder

Senior career*
Years	Team	Apps	(Gls)
1989–1990	St. Louis Storm (indoor)	19	(0)
1990–1992	Milwaukee Wave (indoor)	56	(14)
1992	Miami Freedom	4	(1)
1992–1993	Kansas City Attack (indoor)	20	(4)
1993–1994	Chicago Power (indoor)	17	(0)
- * Club domestic league appearances and goals

Diego Mandagaran is a Uruguayan retired association football midfielder who played professionally in the Major Indoor Soccer League, National Professional Soccer League and American Professional Soccer League.

On October 21, 1989, the St. Louis Storm of the Major Indoor Soccer League signed Mandagaran He played one season in St. Louis. The Storm did not renew his contract in 1990 and Mandagaran moved to the Milwaukee Wave of the National Professional Soccer League. In the summer of 1992, he played four games for the Miami Freedom in the American Professional Soccer League. Despite the low number of games, he was selected as Second Team All League. That fall, he moved to the Kansas City Attack of the NPSL. In June 1993, he played in an exhibition game with the Chicago Power. His performance led to a contract for the 1993-94 season.
