= Mark Waite =

English footballer and manager

Personal information
- Place of birth: Grimsby, England
- Position: Midfielder

College career
Years	Team	Apps	(Gls)
1990–1993	Lock Haven Bald Eagles		

Senior career*
Years	Team	Apps	(Gls)
1994–1996	Hampton Roads Mariners		
1997–1998	Hershey Wildcats	47	(13)

Managerial career
- 1994–1995: Virginia Wesleyan College (assistant)
- 1996–1997: Bloomsburg University (assistant)
- 1998–2009: Old Dominion Monarchs (assistant)
- * Club domestic league appearances and goals

Mark Waite is an English retired football midfielder who has spent his entire playing and coaching career in the United States. He is the son of John Waite.

== Player ==
Waite attended Lock Haven University, playing on the men's soccer team from 1990 to 1993. He was a 1992 NCAA Division II First Team All American and holds the school's career goals record with fifty-seven and the career assists record with thirty-three.
