= Fuseini Dauda =

Ghanaian-Canadian soccer player

Personal information
- Date of birth: May 29, 1975 (age 51)
- Place of birth: Accra, Ghana
- Height: 6 ft 2 in (1.88 m)
- Position: Defender

Senior career*
Years	Team	Apps	(Gls)
1995	Hamilton White Eagles		
1996–1998	Rochester Rhinos	45	(0)
1996–1997	Buffalo Blizzard (indoor)	27	(4)
1997–1998	Detroit Rockers (indoor)	18	(2)
1998–1999	Sportkring Sint-Niklaas	5	(0)
2001	Rochester Rhinos	21	(0)
2004	Vancouver Whitecaps	9	(0)
2005	Hamilton Thunder		
- * Club domestic league appearances and goals

Fuseini Dauda is a retired Ghanaian-Canadian association football player who played professionally in the USL A-League.

In 1995, Dauda played for the Hamilton White Eagles FC in the Canadian National Soccer League. In 1996, he moved south to the Rochester Rhinos of the USISL A-League, playing three seasons with the Rhinos. In the fall of 1996, he began his indoor career with the Buffalo Blizzard of the National Professional Soccer League. Dauda moved to the Detroit Rockers for the 1997-1998 NPSL season. In 1998, he signed with Sportkring Sint-Niklaas of the Belgian Second Division. He returned to the Rhinos for the 2001 A-League season. This season, Rochester won the league title. He spent 2004 with the Vancouver Whitecaps. In 2005, he played for the Hamilton Thunder in the Canadian Professional Soccer League.
