= Richie Sumner =

Canadian soccer player

Personal information
- Place of birth: Canada
- Position: Defender

Youth career
- –1995: Simon Fraser Clan

Senior career*
Years	Team	Apps	(Gls)
1996–1998	Vancouver 86ers		
1996–1997	Harrisburg Heat (indoor)	5	(1)
- * Club domestic league appearances and goals

Richard "Richie" Sumner is a retired Canadian soccer defender who played three seasons in the A-League and one in the National Professional Soccer League.

Sumner attended Simon Fraser University where he was a 1995 First Team NAIA All American soccer player. In 1996, he turned professional with the Vancouver 86ers of the A-League. He played three seasons with Vancouver. Sumner also spent the 1997–1998 National Professional Soccer League season with the Harrisburg Heat.
