= Wojtek Krakowiak =

American soccer player (born 1976)

Personal information
- Full name: Wojciech Krakowiak
- Date of birth: August 6, 1976 (age 50)
- Place of birth: Kielce, Poland
- Height: 5 ft 6 in (1.68 m)
- Position: Midfielder

College career
Years	Team	Apps	(Gls)
1996–1997	St. John's Red Storm		
1998	Clemson Tigers		

Senior career*
Years	Team	Apps	(Gls)
1999	Charleston Battery	3	(0)
2000–2001	San Jose Earthquakes	25	(5)
2001	Tampa Bay Mutiny	1	(0)
2003	New Jersey Stallions	16	(7)

Managerial career
- 2006: Rutgers–Newark (assistant)
- 2007–2009: Rutgers–Newark
- 2010: Montana State Billings (assistant)
- 2011–2016: Montana State Billings
- 2018: Green Bay (interim)
- * Club domestic league appearances and goals

Wojciech "Wojtek" Krakowiak (Polish pronunciation: [ˈvɔi̯t͡ɛk ˈkrakɔviak], born August 6, 1976) is an American retired football (soccer) midfielder who was the head coach of the Montana State University Billings women's soccer team. He played professionally in Major League Soccer. He was the second assistant coach at University of Wisconsin - Green Bay for the women's soccer team but was released of his duties in 2019. He had a short lived career as a coach at FC Bay Soccer Club in a Green Bay, Wisconsin. He is currently a technical director for United Hurricane's in Howard, Wisconsin.

== Playing career ==
=== Youth ===
Krakowiak was born in Kielce, Poland. He moved to Clifton, New Jersey with his family in 1993, and became a United States citizen in March 2000. He graduated from Clifton High School in 1995 and is a member of the Clifton High School Hall of Fame. During his two seasons at Clifton, he scored seventy-nine goals, a school record. In the fall of 1995, he entered St. John's University where a torn anterior cruciate ligament led him to redshirt his freshman season. In 1996, he was part of the Red Storm team which won the NCAA Men's Division I Soccer Championship. He transferred to Clemson University for his junior season where he scored thirty-one goals and added eight assists. That year, he was selected as an All-American and won the Hermann Trophy.

=== Professional ===
Krakowiak left Clemson at the end of the season and moved to Europe where he had trials with teams in Belgium and Germany. On February 7, 1999, the San Jose Clash selected Krakowiak in the second round (fifteenth overall) in the 1999 MLS College Draft. Krakowiak had dropped so low in the draft because his pursuit of a European career. He returned to the United States during the summer of 1999 to train with the Clash, but did not sign with them before returning to Europe to play in the German third division. He also played three games with the Charleston Battery of the USL A-League in August 1999. In February 2000, he signed with the San Jose Earthquakes, playing two seasons before being waived on June 12, 2001. The Tampa Bay Mutiny signed him on June 30, 2001. He played 75 minutes in an away game against the Kansas City Wizards but was waived on July 20, 2001, to make room for Danny Pena. In 2003 and 2004, he played for the New Jersey Stallions in the Premier Development League.

== Coaching career ==
Krakowiak coached the Kent Place School girls' and the Wayne Valley High School boys' soccer teams. In 2006, Krakowiak served as an assistant coach with the Rutgers–Newark men's soccer team. In November 2007, the school elevated Krakowiak to head coach of its women's soccer team. In 2010, he served as the assistant soccer coach to the Montana State University Billings women's team. After helping to lead the team to their first ever NCAA appearance, he was promoted to head coach. The 2016 season was Krakowiak's last with Montana State University Billings. Krakowiak currently coaches with North Carolina FC Youth (2019), where he plans to retire.
