= Lindsay Kennedy-Eversmeyer =

American soccer player

Lindsay Kennedy
Personal information
- Full name: Lindsay Kennedy-Eversmeyer
- Date of birth: February 24, 1980 (age 46)
- Place of birth: Maryville, Illinois
- Height: 5 ft 10 in (1.78 m)
- Position: Forward

Youth career
- 1994–1997: Alton High School

College career
Years	Team	Apps	(Gls)
1998	Kansas Jayhawks	15	(4)
1999–2002	Harris-Stowe Hornets		(61)

Senior career*
Years	Team	Apps	(Gls)
2004–2006	River Cities Futbol Club (Note: Known as St. Louis Archers in 2004)		
2004	St. Louis Steamers (indoor)	3	(0)

Managerial career
- 2013: Harris-Stowe Hornets
- 2014–: UMSL Tritons (assistant)
- 2017–: Fire & Ice SC
- * Club domestic league appearances and goals

Lindsay Kennedy-Eversmeyer (born February 24, 1980) is the first woman to play in the Major Indoor Soccer League (MISL) and fourth to play for a men's professional indoor soccer team. In February 2005, she made her debut for the St. Louis Steamers during the last minute of the match against the Milwaukee Wave. The team signed her to a five-game contract following her appearance.
