= Sebastian Barnes (footballer) =

Ghanaian footballer (born 1976)

Personal information
- Date of birth: 18 November 1976 (age 49)
- Place of birth: Ghana
- Height: 1.69 m (5 ft 7 in)
- Position: Midfielder

Senior career*
Years	Team	Apps	(Gls)
1991–1995	Hearts of Oak		
1995–1996	Bayer Leverkusen	0	(0)
1997	Orlando Sundogs	23	(14)
1997–1998	Mainz 05	6	(0)
1998–2001	VfL Hamm/Sieg		
2006–2008	SF Neitersen		

International career
1991–1993	Ghana U17	12	(0)
1994	Ghana	1	(0)
Medal record
Representing Ghana
FIFA U-17 World Cup
Winner	Italy 1991	U-17 Team
- * Club domestic league appearances and goals

Sebastian Barnes (born 18 November 1976) is a Ghanaian former footballer who played at both professional and international levels as a midfielder.

== Club career ==
Barnes began his career with Hearts of Oak, before playing for top-level German teams Bayer Leverkusen and Mainz 05. In 1997, Barnes played for the Orlando Sundogs in the USISL A-League. After leaving Mainz in 1998, Barnes played for a number of lower league German clubs, including VfL Hamm/Sieg and SF Neitersen.

== International career ==
After representing Ghana at the FIFA U-17 World Championship in both 1991 and 1993, Barnes earned one cap for the senior team in 1994.

== Personal life ==
Barnes is the father of fellow footballer Joselpho Barnes.

== Honours ==
Ghana U17

- FIFA U-17 World Cup: 1991
