= Garret Kusch =

Canadian former soccer player (born 1973)

Personal information
- Full name: Garret Andrew Kusch
- Date of birth: 26 September 1973 (age 53)
- Place of birth: Richmond, British Columbia, Canada
- Height: 1.89 m (6 ft 2 1/2 in)
- Position: Striker

Senior career*
Years	Team	Apps	(Gls)
1995–1997	Vancouver 86ers	45	(17)
1997–1998	Oostende	0	(0)
1998–1999	RAEC Mons	23	(10)
1999–2000	KV Mechelen	2	(0)
2000	Mjällby	11	(8)
2001	Hønefoss	22	(6)
2007	Columbus Clan FC		

International career
1991	Canada U20	2	(0)
1994–1996	Canada U23	8	(1)
1997–2001	Canada	21	(1)
Medal record
Representing Canada
Men's soccer
CONCACAF Gold Cup
Winner	2000 United States
- * Club domestic league appearances and goals

Garret Andrew Kusch (born 26 September 1973) is a Canadian former soccer player who played at both professional and international levels as a striker. After retiring as a player, Kusch became a Chiropractor.

== Club career ==
Born in Richmond, British Columbia, Kusch started his career at local side Vancouver 86ers and then played successfully in a Belgian lower division with Mons. Injury-hit, he then only featured twice for Mechelen in the Belgian First Division in the 1999/2000 season. He revived his career after a foot injury at Swedish second division side Mjällby only to finish the first of his two years-contract at Norwegian second division outfit Hønefoss to quit professional soccer aged just 28 in 2001 to continue his studies.

Kusch briefly came out of retirement in 2007 to play for Columbus Clan FC; earning a silver medal in the Open Canada Cup.

== International career ==
Kusch made his debut for Canada in an April 1997 FIFA World Cup qualification match against El Salvador in Vancouver and earned a total of 21 caps, scoring 1 goal in a 2001 friendly against Iran. He represented Canada in five FIFA World Cup qualification matches and participated in the 2001 FIFA Confederations Cup, where he played his final international against Cameroon.

== Personal life ==
Kusch works for the Canada national team as a chiropractor. His son, Ryder, plays tight end for the Temple Owls football team.

== Honours ==
Canada

- CONCACAF Gold Cup: 2000
