= Daniel Leon =

Peruvian-American soccer player

Personal information
- Full name: Daniel Leon-Penaranda
- Date of birth: October 14, 1974 (age 52)
- Place of birth: Lima, Peru
- Height: 5 ft 4 in (1.63 m)
- Position: Midfielder

Youth career
- Eleftheria Pancyprian

Senior career*
Years	Team	Apps	(Gls)
1994–2003	Long Island Rough Riders		
2004	Brooklyn Knights	13	(1)
- * Club domestic league appearances and goals

Daniel Leon-Penaranda is a retired Peruvian-American soccer midfielder who played professionally in the USL A-League.

Born in Peru, Leon spent much of his youth in the United States where he played for Eleftheria Pancyprian. In 1994, Leon joined the Long Island Rough Riders of the USISL A-League, playing for them until 2003. From 1997 to 2003, he played 126 league games and scored 22 league goals. In 2004, he finished his career with the Brooklyn Knights of the USL Premier Development League.
