= Uihlein Soccer Park =

Stadium in Wisconsin, US

- Interactive map of Uihlein Soccer Park
- Former names: Uihlein Soccer Park
- Location: 7101 W Good Hope Rd, Milwaukee, Wisconsin
- Coordinates: 43°8′48.0″N 87°59′55.8″W
- Owner: Milwaukee County and the Milwaukee Kickers
- Operator: Milwaukee Kickers Soccer Club
- Capacity: Main Stadium: 4,000 in bleachers, 250 lawn seating (all-seated); Aux. Stadium: ~500
- Surface: Field Turf

Construction
- Opened: 1994

Tenants
- Milwaukee Kickers 1994- Local Clubs; Milwaukee Rampage (A-Lg.) 1994-2002; Milwaukee Wave Utd (A-Lg.) 2003-2005; WIAA State Soccer Tournament 2003-Present

Uihlein Soccer Fields, Fall 2011

Uihlein Soccer Park is a 4,000-seat stadium in Milwaukee, Wisconsin built in 1994.

This stadium was originally the home of Milwaukee Rampage, then Milwaukee Wave United. The park has been host to many teams, including the US Women's National Team, and national teams from South Korea, the Netherlands, and Australia. In addition, the University of Wisconsin Badgers men's team has also utilized the park. The WIAA boys and girls state soccer championships have been played at Uihlein Soccer Park since 2003.

The surrounding pitches include 1 alternate stadium (Pat Jones Stadium), and as many as 11 full sided and 3 small sided fields. These pitches are used for tournaments and games for Milwaukee area soccer clubs. Uihlein Soccer Park was built as a joint venture between the city and the Milwaukee Kickers Soccer Club.

Uihlein Soccer Park has also been used for Lacrosse tournaments (Hot 4 Lax), Ultimate Frisbee games (Milwaukee Ultimate), and Hurling matches (Milwaukee Hurling Club).

The indoor building opened in 1996 and holds three indoor soccer fields measuring 182 feet by 84 feet each.

== See also ==
- Parks of Milwaukee
