= A.J. Simeon Stadium =

Stadium in North Carolina

Coordinates: 36.004335°N 80.030782°W

- Interactive map of A.J. Simeon Stadium
- Full name: A.J. Simeon Stadium
- Location: High Point, NC
- Owner: Guilford County Schools
- Capacity: 15,000

Tenant
- John Wesley University

A.J. Simeon Stadium is a 15,000-capacity multi-use stadium in High Point, North Carolina. It is named after Anthony James Simeon (1910–2004), a former North Carolina Athletic Director of the Year. Simeon Stadium is the home of the High Point Central High School and T. Wingate Andrews High School football and soccer events. The stadium was also the home of the Carolina Dynamo professional soccer team of the USL Premier Development League from 1996 to 1999, and the Carolina Phoenix women's football team at various times. The stadium was formerly home to the John Wesley University men's and women's soccer teams.

Simeon Stadium is the largest of the four facilities that make up the High Point Athletic Complex. In addition to Simeon Stadium the complex contains Aderholdt Stadium, a 1,500-capacity multi-use facility used for football and track and field; Ray Correll - John Morris Field, a smaller soccer stadium; and Ed Price Field, a 650-seat baseball stadium.
