= John Smith (footballer, born 1971) =

English footballer

Personal information
- Date of birth: 29 October 1971 (age 55)
- Place of birth: Wigan, England
- Position: Striker

College career
Years	Team	Apps	(Gls)
1993–1996	Rollins Tars		

Senior career*
Years	Team	Apps	(Gls)
1997	Orlando Sundogs	16	(4)
1997–1998	Nashville Metros	37	(11)
1999	Hershey Wildcats	17	(0)
1999	Rochester Rhinos	4	(0)

Managerial career
- 1999–2006: Cal State Bakersfield Roadrunners (men's & women's asst.)
- 2006–2010: Incarnate Word Cardinals
- 2011–2012: Cal State Bakersfield Roadrunners (women's asst.)
- 2012–2015: Stanford Cardinal (asst.)
- 2016–: Cornell Big Red
- * Club domestic league appearances and goals

John Richard Smith (born 29 October 1971) is an English retired football striker who spent his entire career in the United States. He is currently the head coach of the Cornell University men's soccer team.

== Player ==
Smith moved to the United States to attend Rollins College where he played on the men's soccer team from 1993 to 1996. He finished his career at Rollins with the school record for career points (142) and career assists (42). He is third on the career goals list with fifty. He was a 1995 Division II Second Team All American and a 1996 Division II First Team All American.

On 1 February 1997, the Columbus Crew selected Smith in the second round (thirteenth overall) of the 1997 MLS College Draft. The Crew released him during the pre-season and he signed with the Orlando Sundogs of the USISL A-League. In July 1997, the Sundogs traded Smith to the Nashville Metros. In 1998, he tied for tenth on the USISL A-League scoring list. In 1999, he played for the Hershey Wildcats and one game for the Rochester Rhinos.

== Coaching ==
In 1998, Smith became an assistant coach with the Cal State Bakersfield soccer program, where he worked with both the men's and women's teams. In March 2006, the University of the Incarnate Word hired Smith as head coach of its men's soccer program. He coached the then-Division II Incarnate Word team for five seasons, until he was hired away to be an assistant coach for the Stanford Cardinal. After Stanford won the 2015 NCAA Division I Men's Soccer Championship, Smith was announced as the head coach of the Cornell Big Red on March 8, 2016.
