= Juan Castillo (soccer, born 1972) =

American soccer player

Personal information
- Full name: Juan Carlos Castillo
- Date of birth: June 18, 1972 (age 54)
- Place of birth: Miami, Florida, U.S.
- Height: 5 ft 10 in (1.78 m)
- Position: Midfielder

Youth career
- Independiente Santa FE

Senior career*
| Years | Team | Apps | (Gls) |
| 1991–1992 | Miami Freedom | 22 | (1) |
| 1993–1994 | Fort Lauderdale Strikers | | |
| 1996 | Miami Tango | | |
| 1997 | Charleston Battery | 21 | (4) |
| 1998 | Miami Breakers | | |
| 1999 | Atlanta Silverbacks | 27 | (1) |
| 1999–2002 | Cleveland Crunch (indoor) | | |
- * Club domestic league appearances and goals

Juan Castillo is an American retired soccer player who played professionally in the American Professional Soccer League and USL A-League.

== Career ==
In 1991, Castillo turned professional when he signed with the Miami Freedom of the American Professional Soccer League immediately after graduating from high school. He spent two seasons with Miami. In April 1993, Castillo signed with the Fort Lauderdale Strikers. That season he played the end of one game as a stand-in goalkeeper after Mario Jimenez was ejected.

In 1996, he played for the Miami Tango in the USISL Premier League. He moved to the Charleston Battery for the 1997 season. In 1998, Castillo had an unsuccessful trial with the Miami Fusion of Major League Soccer. He then rejoined the Miami Tango, now known as the Miami Breakers. In 1999, he joined the Atlanta Silverbacks where he was the captain of the team. after a great successful season he joined the Cleveland Crunch, a professional indoor team from the NPSL.

He retired in 2002.

== Personal life ==
He currently resides in Miami Fl is the father of Daniel, Olivia and Samuel and married to Ana Gaviria-Castillo. Currently assisting to college and working on his bachelor's degree.
