= Vicente Figueroa =

Mexican daughter Erika Figueroafootballer (born 1977)

Personal information
- Full name: Vicente Figueroa Spouse = Angelica Figueroa Children= Eric Mateo Figueroa, Erika Natalia Figueroa
- Date of birth: October 22, 1977 (age 49)
- Place of birth: Guadalajara, Mexico
- Height: 5 ft 6 in (1.68 m)
- Position: Midfielder

Senior career*
Years	Team	Apps	(Gls)
1997	Seattle Sounders	5	(1)
1998	San Jose Clash	20	(0)
1998	→ MLS Pro 40 (loan)	3	(0)
1999–2000	Kansas City Wizards	30	(1)
1999	→ MLS Pro 40 (loan)	1	(0)
2000	→ MLS Pro 40 (loan)	9	(1)
2001	El Paso Patriots	12	(0)
2003–2005	OTW Santa Clara (indoor)		
2005–2007	California Cougars (indoor)	49	(49)
2008–2009	Baltimore Blast (indoor)	11	(0)
2009–2010	California Cougars (indoor)	12	(8)
2010	Top Notch FC (indoor)		
2010–2011	Revolución Tijuana (indoor)	1	(0)
2011–2012	Anaheim Bolts (indoor)	0	(0)
- * Club domestic league appearances and goals

Vicente Figueroa (born 22 October 1977) is a Mexican former professional footballer who played as a midfielder who spent three seasons in Major League Soccer.

== Club career ==
In 1997, Figueroa practiced with the San Jose Clash, but was never offered a contract. On August 14, 1997, the Seattle Sounders of the A-League signed Figueroa. In December 1997, Figueroa signed a one-year contract with the Sounders. However, in April 1998, the Clash signed Figueroa as a discovery player after the Sounders released him. On November 1, 1998, the Clash waived Figueroa and seven other players after a dismal season. He then signed with the Kansas City Wizards. He spent two seasons in Kansas City, going on loan to MLS Pro 40 for a handful of games during both seasons. In 2001, he moved to the El Paso Patriots of the USL A-League. From 2003 to 2005, Figueroa played for OTW Santa Clara in the Premier Arena Soccer League. In 2005, he had a successful trial with the California Cougars of the second Major Indoor Soccer League. He was the 2005 MISL Rookie of the Year. In September 2007, Figueroa tore his right anterior cruciate ligament and his right lateral meniscus in a pre-season exhibition game with the Cougars, losing the entire season. In 2008, he moved to the Baltimore Blast of the National Indoor Soccer League. In November 2009, Figueroa returned to the Cougars, now playing in the PASL. In 2010, he joined Top Notch FC of the PASL.
