= Esmundo Rodriguez =

American soccer player

Personal information
- Full name: Esmundo Rodriguez
- Date of birth: May 25, 1977 (age 49)
- Place of birth: Chicago, Illinois, U.S.
- Height: 5 ft 8 in (1.73 m)
- Position: Forward

Youth career
- 1995–1996: New Mexico Lobos

Senior career*
Years	Team	Apps	(Gls)
1997–2000	San Jose Earthquakes	10	(0)
1997	→ Seattle Sounders (loan)	3	(1)
1998–2000	→ MLS Pro-40 (loan)	34	(6)
2000	Dallas Burn	3	(1)
2001	El Paso Patriots	23	(0)
Total		73	(8)

International career
1997	United States U20	3	(0)
- * Club domestic league appearances and goals

Esmundo Rodriguez (born May 25, 1977) is an American former soccer player.
