= John Richard Smith (footballer, born 1898) =

English footballer (1898–1986)

Personal information
- Full name: John Richard Smith
- Date of birth: 26 July 1898
- Place of birth: Bristol, England
- Date of death: 1986 (aged 87–88)
- Position: Centre forward

Senior career*
Years	Team	Apps	(Gls)
1920–1921	Victoria Albion		
1921–1924	Bristol City	27	(12)
1924	Plymouth Argyle	6	(4)
1924–1926	Aberdare Athletic	66	(41)
1926–1928	Fulham	34	(9)
1928	Guildford City		
1928–1929	Rochdale	0	(0)
1929	Caernarvon Athletic		
1929–1930	Wrexham	6	(2)
1930	Burton Town		
Total		188	(9)
- * Club domestic league appearances and goals

John Richard Smith (26 July 1898 – 1986) was an English footballer who played in the Football League for Aberdare Athletic, Bristol City, Fulham, Plymouth Argyle and Wrexham.
