= Milwaukee Rampage =

- Full name: Milwaukee Rampage
- Nickname(s): Rampage
- Founded: 1993
- Dissolved: 2002 (as a professional franchise)
- Stadium: Uihlein Soccer Park; Milwaukee, Wisconsin
- Capacity: 7,000
- League: A-League

The Milwaukee Rampage is a former professional American soccer team, that was located in Milwaukee, Wisconsin, which played in the A-League.

== History ==
Founded in 1993 by Milwaukee area businessmen Dan Doucette and Jim Hock, the Rampage played its first game on June 24, 1993, against Siarka Tarnobrzeg. Head coach Boro Sucevic fielded a team which included Tony Sanneh, Brian McBride, Kris Kelderman, Joey Kirk and Steve Provan. The Rampage played another six exhibition games that summer before playing in its first full season a year later. The team entered the 1994 United States Interregional Soccer League where it fell to the Minnesota Thunder in the Midwest Division final. This set up a rivalry between the two teams which continued until the Rampage's departure in 2002. In 1995, the USISL split into an upper and lower league. The Rampage joined the higher, professional league. That year, Milwaukee again fell to the Thunder in the Midwest Division final. In 1996, the USISL added a third league, the 1996 USISL Select League. In 1996, the Select League, along with the competing A-League, both received Division 2 status from FIFA. This led to a merger between the two leagues to form the 1997 A-League under the umbrella of the USISL. Milwaukee joined this combined league. Head Coach Bob Gansler led the team to Milwaukee's first professional sports championship since the 1971 Milwaukee Bucks. The Rampage defeated the Carolina Dynamo in a shootout. The team won the championship once more in 2002 under Head Coach Boro Sucevic before the franchise folded later that year. The Milwaukee Rampage still exists as a professional soccer club and non-profit in Milwaukee.

== General managers ==
- Pat Clemens (1994)
- Jim Harwood (1994–2002)

== Coaches ==
- Boro Sucevic (1993–1994, 2000–2002)
- Carlos Cordoba (1995, 1999)
- Bob Gansler (1996–1998)

== Year-by-year ==
Year	Division	League	Reg. season	Playoffs	Open Cup	Avg. attendance
1993	Exhibition schedule					
1994	3	USISL	2nd, Midwest	Divisional Finals	Did not enter	—
1995	3	USISL Pro League	1st, Midwest West	Sizzling Nine	Did not qualify	—
1996	3	USISL Select League	1st, Central	2nd Round	Did not qualify	3,053
1997	2	USISL A-League	4th, Central	Champion	Did not qualify	3,165
1998	2	USISL A-League	3rd, Central	Conference Quarterfinals	2nd Round	3,176
1999	2	USL A-League	5th, Central	Did not qualify	Did not qualify	3,219
2000	2	USL A-League	2nd, Central	Conference Finals	Did not qualify	3,654
2001	2	USL A-League	3rd, Western	Semifinals	3rd Round	2,682
2002	2	USL A-League	1st, Central	Champion	Quarterfinals	2,058
