= Orlando Sundogs =

The Orlando Sundogs were an American soccer club created by Orlando Soccer pioneer Mark Dillon that played in the A-League in 1997. The team nearly folded before the end of the season, but were purchased by the Atlanta Ruckus. During the off season, the team tried to find a suitable venue for an A-League team outside the Florida Citrus Bowl, but ran out of options and time. Thus, the franchise was terminated by the USISL.

Orlando lost its playoff series to the New Orleans Riverboat Gamblers. The first game in Orlando was a 2–1 defeat in front of 500 fans, and the second game was a 6–2 loss. Steve Freeman and Sebastian Barnes were named to the Western Conference roster for the A-League all-star game. Marcos Marchado was 8th in the league with a 1.19 GAA in 26 games played.

== Year-by-year ==
Year	Division	League	Reg. season	Playoffs	Open Cup
1997	2	USISL A-League	3rd, Central	Division Semifinals	Lost to Chicago Stingers, 3-0 in the 2nd round
