= Salem City FC =

- Full name: Salem City Football Club
- Founded: 1993; 33 years ago as the Greensboro Dynamo
- Stadium: Crater Stadium
- Capacity: 2,500
- Head Coach: William Lennie
- League: USL League Two
- 2026: South Atlantic Division
- Website: salemcityfc.com
Home colors	Away colors

Salem City Football Club is an American amateur soccer club based in Bermuda Run, North Carolina that fields a men's team in USL League Two, and a women's team as the "North Carolina Fusion" in the USL W League. The teams play their home games at the Crater Stadium.

== History ==
The team, which was named "Greensboro Dynamo" until 1996, was owned by Neil Macpherson, a passionate follower and former shareholder of English football club Nottingham Forest, as could be seen from the similarities between the crest of Greensboro Dynamo and the crest of Forest.

In 2018, the Carolina Dynamo merged with NC Fusion to form "North Carolina Fusion U-23". In 2023, the club was purchased by a private group who rebranded the club as "Salem City FC", seeking to link the team more directly with Winston-Salem. Plans were announced in June of the 2026 USL League Two season of an eventual move to the USL League One

== Year-by-year ==
Year	Division	League	Regular season	Playoffs	Open Cup
Greensboro Dynamo
1993	N/A	USISL	1st, Atlantic	Champions	did not enter
1993/94	N/A	USISL Indoor	3rd, Northern	withdrew after 3 games	N/A
1994	3	USISL	1st, Atlantic	Champions	did not enter
1995	3	USISL Pro League	6th, Atlantic	did not qualify	did not qualify
Carolina Dynamo
1996	2	USISL Select League	1st, South Atlantic	2nd Round	Quarterfinals
1997	2	USISL A-League	2nd, Atlantic	Final	did not qualify
1998	On Hiatus				
1999	3	USL D3-Pro League	3rd, Atlantic	Conference Semifinals	3rd Round
2000	3	USL D3-Pro League	4th, Southern	Conference Semifinals	did not qualify
2001	3	USL D3-Pro League	2nd, Southern	Conference Semifinals	2nd Round
2002	3	USL D3-Pro League	3rd, Southern	Quarterfinals	1st Round
2003	3	USL PSL	1st, Southern	Regional Finals	3rd Round
2004	4	USL PDL	1st, Mid Atlantic	National Semifinals	3rd Round
2005	4	USL PDL	2nd, Mid Atlantic	did not qualify	did not qualify
2006	4	USL PDL	1st, South Atlantic	Conference Semifinals	4th Round
2007	4	USL PDL	1st, Southeast	Conference Finals	did not qualify
2008	4	USL PDL	6th, Southeast	did not qualify	did not qualify
2009	4	USL PDL	2nd, Mid Atlantic	Divisional Semifinals	did not qualify
2010	4	USL PDL	4th, Mid Atlantic	did not qualify	did not qualify
2011	4	USL PDL	1st, South Atlantic	Conference Semifinals	1st Round
2012	4	USL PDL	1st, South Atlantic	Finals	1st Round
2013	4	USL PDL	1st, South Atlantic	Conference Semifinals	2nd Round
2014	4	USL PDL	4th, South Atlantic	did not qualify	2nd Round
2015	4	USL PDL	4th, South Atlantic	did not qualify	did not qualify
2016	4	USL PDL	2nd, South Atlantic	Conference Semifinals	did not qualify
2017	4	USL PDL	10th, South Atlantic	did not qualify	2nd Round
2018	4	USL PDL	6th, South Atlantic	did not qualify	did not qualify
North Carolina Fusion U23
2019	4	USL League Two	1st, South Atlantic	Conference Semifinals	did not qualify
2020	4	USL League Two	Season cancelled due to COVID-19 pandemic		
2021	4	USL League Two	1st, South Atlantic	National Final	Cancelled
2022	4	USL League Two	1st, South Atlantic	National Semifinals	3rd Round
2023	4	USL League Two	1st, South Atlantic	Conference Semifinals	3rd Round
Salem City FC
2024	4	USL League Two	1st, South Atlantic	Conference Semifinals	did not qualify
2025	4	USL League Two	1st, South Atlantic	Conference Quarterfinals	did not qualify
2026	4	USL League Two	7th, South Atlantic	did not qualify	did not qualify

== Honors ==
=== Premier Development League / USL League Two ===
- Regular Season Champions (1): 2006
- National Championship Final (2): 2012, 2021
- Eastern Conference Champions (2): 2004, 2012
- Southern Conference Champions (2): 2021, 2022
- Division Champions (12)
  - Mid Atlantic Division (1): 2004
  - South Atlantic Division (10): 2006, 2011, 2012, 2013, 2019, 2021, 2022, 2023, 2024, 2025
  - Southeast Division (1): 2007

=== Others ===
- USISL Champions (2): 1993, 1994
- USISL Atlantic Division Champions (2): 1993, 1994
- USISL Select League South Atlantic Division Champions (1): 1996
- USL Pro Select/Soccer League Southern Division Champions (1): 2003
- National Amateur Cup (1): 2013

== Head coaches ==
- (England) Michael Parker (1993–1995)
- (England) Alan Dicks (1996–1997)
- (United States) Joe Brown (1999–2000)
- (England) Robert Rosario (2001)
- (United States) Joe Brown (2002–2003)
- (United States) Carl Fleming (2004)
- (United States) Joe Brown (2005–2010)
- (England) Marc Nicholls (2011–2015)
- (New Zealand) Tony Falvino (2016–2018)
- (Wales) Chris Williams (2018–2025)
- (England) William Lennie (2026–present)

== Stadium ==
- UNCG Soccer Stadium; Greensboro, North Carolina (1993–1996)
- A.J. Simeon Stadium; High Point, North Carolina (1996–1999)
- Macpherson Stadium; Browns Summit, North Carolina (2003–present)
- Truist Sports Park; Winston-Salem, North Carolina 3 games (2009–2010)
- Vert Stadium at High Point University; High Point, North Carolina 1 game (2010)
- Truist Point; High Point, North Carolina 3 games (2021–2021)
- Truist Sports Park; Bermuda Run, North Carolina (2024–2025)
- M. Douglas Crater Stadium; Winston-Salem, North Carolina (2026–Present)

== Average attendance ==
Attendance stats are calculated by averaging each team's self-reported home attendances from the historical match archive at https://web.archive.org/web/20100105175057/http://www.uslsoccer.com/history/index_E.html and Kenn.com https://kenn.com/blog/soccer/all-time-usl-third-division-attendance/, and https://kenn.com/blog/soccer/all-time-usl-league-two-attendance/.

Greensboro Dynamo

- 1993: NA Playoffs: 1,869
- 1994: NA Playoffs: 2,592
- 1995: 2,263

Carolina Dynamo

- 1996: 1,552 Playoffs: 2,187 or 1,787 Overall: 1,597 or 1,568
- 1997: 2,605 (10th in A-League) Playoffs: 1,533 Overall: 2,471
- 1999: 922
- 2000: 839
- 2001: 1,064 Playoffs: NA
- 2002: 910
- 2003: 732 Playoffs: NA
- 2004: 716 (6th in PDL) Playoffs: 948 Overall: 762
- 2005: 957 (4th in PDL)
- 2006: 1,460 (3rd in PDL) Playoffs: 1,300 Overall: 1,440
- 2007: 2,168 (3rd in PDL)
- 2008: 948 or 1,952 (4th in PDL)
- 2009: 863 or 1,048 (9th in PDL) Playoffs:NA
- 2010: 1,676 (4th in PDL) or 1,153 (7th in PDL)
- 2011: 1,703 (3rd in PDL) Playoffs: 2,519 Overall: 1,794
- 2012: 1,703 (4th in PDL) Playoffs: 3,260 Overall: 2,222
- 2013: 1,779 (4th in PDL)
- 2014: 1,866 (5th in PDL)
- 2015: 1,195 (4th in PDL)
- 2016: NA Playoffs: NA
- 2017:NA
- 2018:NA

North Carolina Fusion U23

- 2019:NA
- 2021:NA
- 2022:NA
- 2023:NA

Salem City FC

- 2024:NA
- 2025:NA

== See also ==
- Dynamo (disambiguation)
