= St. Louis Steamers (1998–2006) =

- Founded: 1998
- Dissolved: 2006
- Ground: Scottrade Center (2004–2006) Family Arena (2000–2001 & 2003–2004), St. Louis, Missouri
- Capacity: 10,000
- League: WISL & MISL II
Home colors

The St. Louis Steamers was the name of a professional indoor soccer team based in St. Louis, Missouri. It was the second team to use this name. The first played in the Major Indoor Soccer League from 1979–1988, while this version played in the World Indoor Soccer League from 2000 to 2001, then in the MISL from the 2003–04 season to the 2005–06 season.

The St. Louis Steamers were granted a World Indoor Soccer League expansion franchise in December 1998 but did not begin to play until the 2000 season. In 2002, the team, along with fellow WISL teams Dallas Sidekicks and San Diego Sockers joined the Major Indoor Soccer League when the two leagues merged. However, the Steamers elected to take a year off to reorganize.

The team was purchased before the 2004–05 season by owners planning a reality television series about the team, which was called Red Card and played on KPLR channel 11. The team suspended operations after the 2005–2006 season.

== Honors ==
Division titles

- 2005–2006 MISL Regular Season

== Year-by-year ==
Year	League	Reg. season	Playoffs	Avg. attendance
2000	WISL	5th WISL, 9–15	Lost Semifinal	5,398
2001	WISL	3rd WISL, 11–13	Lost Semifinal	4,812
2003–04	MISL	3rd Central, 14–22	Opted Out Of Playoffs	3,483
2004–05	MISL	4th MISL, 20–20	Lost Semifinal	4,794
2005–06	MISL	1st MISL, 23–7	Lost Championship	5,675

== Head coaches ==
- Daryl Doran 2000–2001 & 2003–2005
- Omid Namazi 2005–2006
- Joe Reiniger 2005–2006 (served as head coach during a Namazi suspension)

== Notable players ==
- Joe Reiniger
- Randy Soderman
- Lindsay Kennedy

== Owners ==
- Michael Hetelson, (CEO/Managing Partner) (2004-2006)
- Wally Smerconish (2004-2006)

== Arenas ==
- Family Arena 2000–2001 & 2003–2004
- Scottrade Center 2004–2006

== See also ==
- Soccer in St. Louis
